= 1974 Toronto municipal election =

1974 Toronto mayoral election
- December 2, 1974
- Turnout: 27%
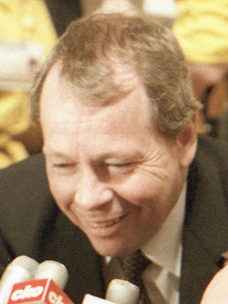

Candidate	David Crombie	Don Andrews
Popular vote	100,680	5,662
Percentage	83%	4%
Mayor of Toronto before election
David Crombie
Elected Mayor of Toronto
David Crombie

The 1974 Toronto municipal election was held on December 2, 1974 in Metropolitan Toronto, Ontario, Canada. Mayors, controllers, city councillors and school board trustees were elected in the municipalities of Toronto, York, East York, North York, Etobicoke and Scarborough.

David Crombie was re-elected as Mayor of Toronto with around 83% of the vote, and Mel Lastman was re-elected as Mayor of North York.

== Toronto ==
=== Mayoral race ===
Incumbent David Crombie was extremely popular after his first term and faced no serious opposition in winning reelection. White supremacist Don Andrews placed second amongst the also-rans. As a result, the municipal law was changed so that the runner-up in the mayoralty contest no longer had the right to succeed to the mayor's chair should the position become vacant between elections.

Results
David Crombie - 100,680
Don Andrews - 5,662
Joan Campana - 3,022
Rosy Sunrise - 2,294
William Harris - 2,262
Glenn Julian - 2,423
Richard Sangers - 1,454
Ronald Rodgers
Rick Peletz - 1,024
Arthur Seligman - 745
Karl von Harten - 624

=== City council ===
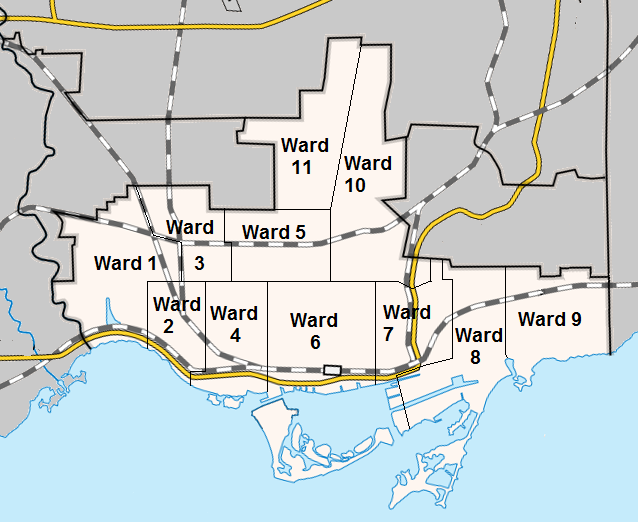
Ward boundaries used in the 1974 election

Two aldermen were elected per ward. The alderman with the most votes was declared senior alderman and sat on both Toronto City Council and Metro Council.

There were few major changes on city council. The reform faction remained the largest group on council, but did have a majority. The conservative "old guard" retained their seats as did the small Crombie-led group of moderates that made up the swing vote on council. Most incumbents were reelected with only a handful of exceptions. After failing to win the mayoralty in 1972 Tony O'Donohue returned to city council and successfully ousted New Democrat Archie Chisholm in Ward 2. In the downtown Ward 6 race anti-Spadina Expressway activist Allan Sparrow ousted long serving old guard member William Archer.

The final executive, elected by city council, consisted of two right-of-centre moderates, Art Eggleton and David Smith, and two moderate reformers, Elizabeth Eayrs and Reid Scott. Crombie held the deciding vote between the right- and left-wing duos.

Ward 1 (Swansea and Bloor West Village)
William Boytchuk (incumbent) - 6,158
Elizabeth Eayrs (incumbent) - 3,038
Ed Ziemba - 4,199
Ben Grys - 3,174
Wally Soia - 1,861
Ceri Gluszczek - 1,275
Ed Homonvio - 916
Ib Amonsen - 764
Joe Grabek - 481
Yvette Tessier - 189
Andries Murnieks - 157

Ward 2 (Parkdale and Brockton)
Tony O'Donohue - 6,375
Ed Negridge (incumbent) - 4,968
Archie Chisholm (incumbent) - 3,538
Eleanor Bra - 1,192
Anne Fritz - 941
Jack Prins - 175

Ward 3 (Davenport and Corso Italia)
Michael Goldrick (incumbent) - 5,216
Joseph Piccininni (incumbent) - 4,254
Slough Bolton - 1,395
Jerry Hill - 405
George Zapparoli - 404
Michael Hookway - 191
Manuel Lumbreras - 119

Ward 4 (Trinity-Bellwoods and Little Italy)
Art Eggleton (incumbent) - 4,341
George Ben (incumbent) - 2,708
Joe Pantalone -1,759
Frank Latka - 1,247
Pat Case - 533
Penny Simpson - 234
Bob Smith - 200

Ward 5 (The Annex and Yorkville)
Colin Vaughan (incumbent) - 8,195
Ying Hope (incumbent) - 7,173
Erna Koffman - 1,737
Manfred Schulzke - 1,643
David Astle - 1,096
Judy Lily Lucko - 371
Lazlo Simo - 287
Gary Weagle - 201

Ward 6 (Financial District, Toronto - University of Toronto)
Dan Heap (incumbent) - 6,607
Allan Sparrow - 5,564
William Archer (incumbent) - 4,311
K Dock Yip - 2,507
John Combs - 1,346
Arthur Boyes - 368
Fred Nelson - 294

Ward 7 (Regent Park and Riverdale)
John Sewell (incumbent) - 6,233
Janet Howard - 4,248
Gary Stamm - 3,813
Andy Marinakis - 603
Peggy Reinhardt - 454
John Bizzell - 289
Stanley Carrier - 388
Kate Alderdice - 329
Steve Necheff - 257
Sandra Fox - 248
Armand Siksna - 212

Ward 8 (Riverdale)
Thomas Clifford (incumbent) - 5,567
Fred Beavis (incumbent) - 5,574
Dallard Runge - 3,967
Steve Martino - 796
Larry Haiven - 496
John Iannou - 398
John Tsopelas - 361
Alex Lauder - 338
Beatrice Zaverrucha - 245
Chris Greenland - 236

On January 28, 1975 a judicial recount gave Clifford a 7 vote majority over Beavis which gave him a seat on Metro Council.

Ward 9 (The Beaches)
Reid Scott (incumbent) - 8,405
Dorothy Thomas (incumbent) - 7,016
Joe McNulty - 5,106
Mary Trew - 417
Brian Dunia - 412

Ward 10 (Rosedale and North Toronto)
William Kilbourn (incumbent) - 11,446
John Bosley - 5,352
Kevin Garland - 4,979
Juanne Hemsol - 3,754
Michael Grayson - 1,818
Bruce Haines - 1,543
Russell Puskluwez - 1,464
Margaret Bryce - 953
Horace Brown - 680
John Kelly - 597

Ward 11 (Forest Hill and North Toronto)
David Smith (incumbent) - 11,933
Anne Johnston (incumbent) - 10,804
Pauline Shapero - 3,140
Sydney Zaidi - 741

== Vacancy ==
Ward 9 Alderman Reid Scott resigned upon appointment as provincial judge August 6, 1976. Dorothy Thomas now became sole Alderman and was appointed Metro Councillor on August 18.

== East York ==
- (incumbent)Willis Blair - 15,018
- Ed Shaw - 6,513

(Source: Globe and Mail, pg 10, December 3, 1974)

== Etobicoke ==
=== Mayor ===
- (incumbent)Dennis Flynn - 28,390
- Bill Stockwell - 21,160
- Mary Legg - 2,022
- Richard Broughton - 1,749

(Source: Globe and Mail, pg 10, December 3, 1974)

=== Board of Control ===
(4 elected)

- (incumbent)Bruce Sinclair - 30,373
- (incumbent)E. H. Farrow - 26,157
- Nora Pownall - 24,078
- (incumbent)John Allen - 21,528
- Marcel Cox - 19,551
- Dorothy Price - 16,639
- Andrew Macdonald - 14,170
- Don Nelson - 6,776

== North York ==
=== Mayor ===
- (incumbent)Mel Lastman - 52,567
- Edward Wells - 19,831
- Malcolm Cairnduff - 2,875

(1057 out of 1216 polls)

=== Board of Control ===
(4 elected)

- (incumbent)Barbara Greene - 46,355
- William Sutherland - 36,752
- (incumbent)Alex McGivern - 30,752
- Joseph Markin - 27,974
- Jack Bedder - 18,814
- Wagman - 16,977
- Holmes - 16,383
- Petersen - 12,205
- Bernadette Michael - 11,962
- Medhurst - 8,276
- Telfer - 4,231

(1057 out of 1216 polls)

=== Ward Alderman ===
Esther Shiner and Robert Yuill were re-elected aldermen for Wards 2 and 4 respectively.

1974 Toronto municipal election: North York Board of Education, Separate School Representative (Area One)
Candidate	Votes	%
Peter Caruso	2,393	38.77
(x)William Higgins	1,919	31.09
Joe Volpe	1,860	30.14
Total valid votes	6,172	100.00

- Peter Caruso served on the North York Board of Education from 1974 to 1978, and again from 1980 to 1982. He was a business evaluator in private life, and owned Equity Reality Ltd. in the 1980s. He was first elected in 1974, defeating William Higgins to become the Separate School Representative for Area One. Re-elected in 1976, he lost his seat to Leonardo Cianfarani in 1978. He was re-elected for Area Two in 1980. In 1982, Toronto Separate School trustee Antonio Signoroni accused fellow trustee Joseph Marrese of being involved in a conflict-of-interest situation with Caruso. Marrese and Caruso were cousins and shared a business office, and Marrese had previously voted for contracts that went to Caruso's firm. Both Marrese and Caruso acknowledged the contracts, but denied any wrongdoing. Marrese argued that he had never shown preference to Caruso and questioned Signoroni's motives in raising the matter, noting that another of his relatives was challenging Signoroni in the 1982 campaign. Marrese was re-elected, but Caruso lost his seat on the North York board to Maria Augimeri.
- William Higgins served on the North York Board of Education from 1972 to 1974, as one of the board's first two Separate School Representatives following reforms by the provincial government of Bill Davis. Higgins was 23 years old at the time of his election, and was a high school history teacher in private life. He was also a representative on the Ontario English Teachers' Catholic Association. He defeated Donald Clune to win election in 1972, and was defeated by Peter Caruso in 1974. He later sought election 1976, but finished fourth against Jim Travers in Area Two. In 2000, a retired person named Bill Higgins campaigned unsuccessfully for the Toronto Catholic District School Board's fifth ward. It is assumed that this is the same person.

1974 Toronto municipal election: North York Hydro Commission (two members elected)
Candidate	Votes	%
(x) John Dunn	29,240	21.14
(x) D'arcy McConvey	22,084	15.96
Carl Anderson	19,965	14.43
Leon Donsky	16,577	11.98
Howard Moscoe	14,575	10.54
Alec Davis	12,091	8.74
Bernard Birman	10,912	7.89
Peter Slattery	5,409	3.91
William Lynch	4,083	2.95
Jack Newton	3,407	2.46
Total valid votes	138,343	100.00

Electors could vote for two candidates.
The percentages are determined in relation to the total number of votes.
There may be a transcription error in the result for Carl Anderson (the last two numbers were partly obscured).

- Dunn and McConvey ran as a team, and described themselves as "sound administration" candidates. A newspaper advertisement from 1974 lists their accomplishments on the Hydro Commission, and indicated that they did not incur any debt.
- John Rankin Dunn was a professional engineer, and an employee of Lake Engineering Ltd. He was first elected to the Hydro Commission in 1966, and served until shortly after the 1976 election when, at age sixty, he was appointed to the Ontario Energy Board. Dunn died on June 2, 2000.
- D'arcy McConvey was a professional engineer, and was the founder and president of the Dalex Corporation. He was first elected to the Hydro Commission in 1969, and served until his defeat at the polls in 1978 at age sixty. Initially an ally of John Rankin Dunn, McConvey campaigned in an alliance with Carl Anderson following Dunn's retirement. He sought re-election in 1980, but was unsuccessful.
- D. Carl Anderson was a school principal in private life. He was made a fellow of the Ontario Teachers' Federation in 1976, and an Honorary Life Member of the Ontario Public School Teachers' Federation in 1987. He first sought election to the North York Hydro Commission in 1974, and finished third. He placed third again in 1976, but was appointed by council to the commission following the election when incumbent commissioner John Dunn resigned to take a position on the Ontario Energy Board. Anderson was re-elected in 1978, 1980, 1982, 1985, 1988, 1991 and 1994. He became chairman of the commission in or around 1980, and held the position on-and-off until the 1997, when North York was amalgamated into Toronto and the local hydro commission ceased to exist. He also served as chairman of Ontario's Municipal Electrical Association during the 1980s, and sat on the board of directors of the American Public Power Association. He warned of a possible energy shortage in 1989, and recommended the immediate construction of new facilities. In 1994, he helped introduce hydro bill gift certificates for North York residents. Anderson was appointed to the board of Ontario Hydro in June 1995, and to the board of directors of Ontario's newly created Independent Electricity Market Operator in February 1999. He was listed as fifty-seven years old in a 1988 newspaper article.
- Leon Donsky campaigned for the North York Hydro Board in 1964, 1966, 1969, 1972 and 1974, losing each time. A 1964 newspaper article identifies him as a thirty-four-year-old electrical technology graduate from Ryerson Polytechnical Institute.
- Alex Davis (also called Alec Davis) campaigned for the North York Hydro Board in 1974 and 1976, and ran for the North York Board of education in 1978. A newspaper article from the latter campaign lists him as a forty-nine-year-old telecommunications manager. He supported completion of the Spadina Expressway. He led a sub-committee to draft a smoking control by-law in 1984.
- Bernard Birman ran for the North York Hydro Board in 1972 and 1974, losing both times.
- Peter Slattery was a first-time candidate.
- William (Bill) Lynch campaigned for the North York City Council in 1969, and for the Hydro Council in 1974, 1980 and 1982. He was a member of the Liberal Party, although he campaigned as an independent. A newspaper article from his first campaign lists him as a thirty-eight-year-old car salesman.
- John (Jack) V. Newton was elected as a North York School Trustee in 1962, and was re-elected in 1964 and 1966 before losing to Margaret Grant in 1969. He supported religious teaching in the public system. He campaigned for the North York City Council in 1972 and the Hydro Commission in 1974, and lost both times. A report from the 1972 election lists him as a metallurgical engineer and sales co-ordinator for the metal industry, and a member of the Progressive Conservative Party. He tried to return to the Board of Education in 1976, and was again defeated.

Results taken from the Toronto Star, 3 December 1974.
The final official results were not significantly different.

== Scarborough ==
In Scarborough, Paul Cosgrove was re-elected as Mayor of Scarborough.

=== Mayor ===
(incumbent)Paul Cosgrove, 51,120
John McMahon, 6,432

=== Board of Control (4 elected) ===
(incumbent)Gus Harris, 37,931
(incumbent)Ken Morrish, 37,277
(incumbent)Brian Harrison, 32,643
Joyce Trimmer, 28,659
Anne Johnston, 20,831
(incumbent)Karl Mallette, 20,430

=== Council ===
Ward 1
Bill Belfontaine, 3,983
Wally Malesky, 983

Ward 2
Carol Ruddell, 2,671
Jon Halun, 1,183
Gordon McMillen, 681

Ward 3
Norm Kelly, 2,503
Herb Crosby, 1,770
Jim Cottrell, 978
Kevin Smith, 151

Ward 4
Jack Goodland, 3,483
Ted Littleford, 1,431

Ward 5
Frank Faubert, 3,458
Spurge Near, 1,963

Ward 6
Fred Bland, 2,335
Ross Daswell, 1,437
Michael McPherson, 630
Richard Wells, 413

Ward 7
Ed Fulton (acclaimed)

Ward 8
Shirley Eidt (acclaimed)

Ward 9
Doug Colling, 4,972
Mary Zissoff, 1,139

Ward 10
Ron Watson, 2,915
Clare Mabiev, 2,226

Ward 11
John Wimbs, 1,324
Gary Jackson, 1,263
Bob Watson, 889

Ward 12
Joe Dekort, 779
Ben Loughlin, 391
Larry Calcutt, 363
Gordon Clarke, 328
Jim Bryers, 269
Bill Waters, 229
Sean Regan, 175

== York ==
=== Mayor ===
- (incumbent)Philip White - 13,590
- Fergy Brown - 11,791

=== Board of Control ===
(2 elected)

- (incumbent)Douglas Saunders - 17,207
- (incumbent)James Trimbee - 14,987
- Rose Gallic - 4,981

(Source: Globe and Mail, pg 10, December 3, 1974)
