= 1980 Toronto municipal election =

Municipal election in Toronto, Canada

1980 Toronto mayoral election
- November 10, 1980
- Turnout: 44.9%
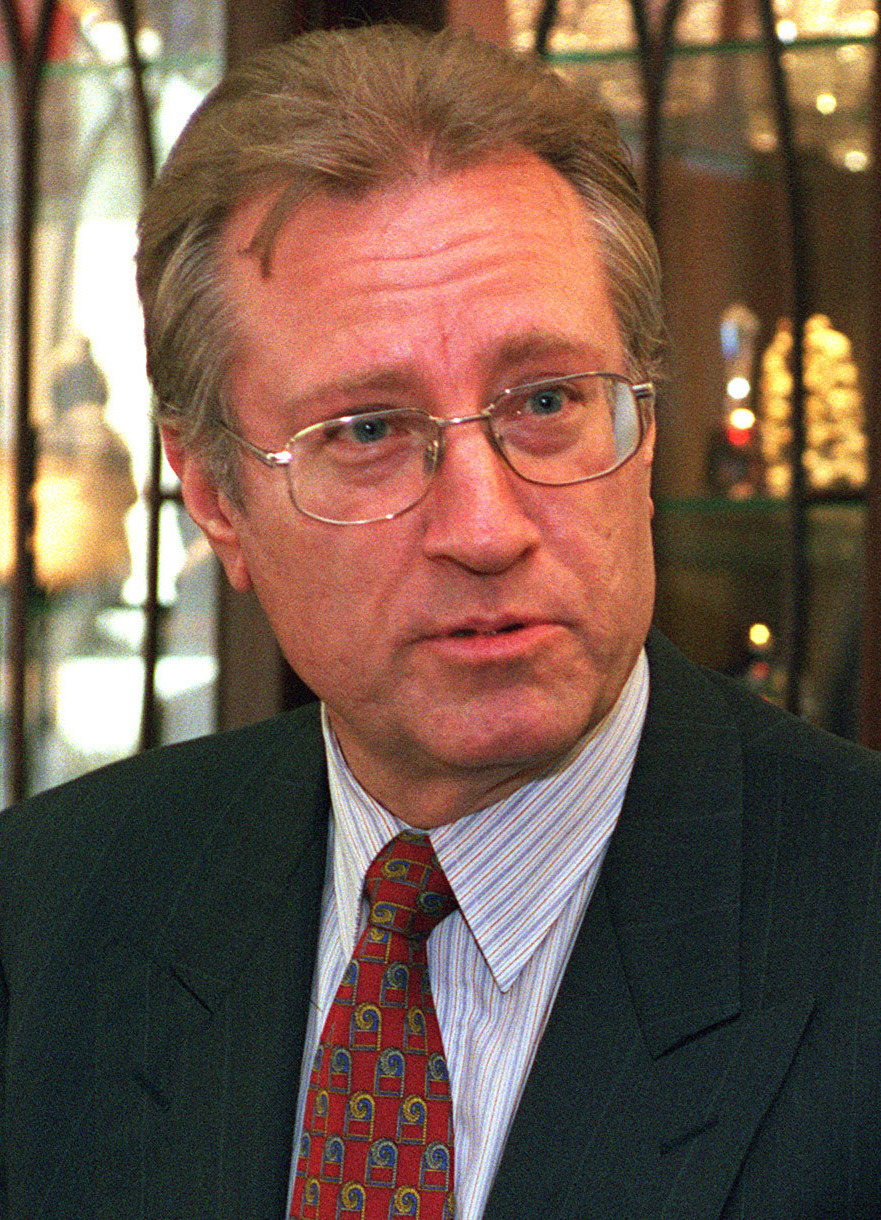

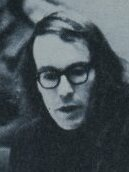
Candidate	Art Eggleton	John Sewell
Popular vote	87,919	86,152
Percentage	47.8%	46.9%
Mayor of Toronto before election
John Sewell
Elected Mayor of Toronto
Art Eggleton

The 1980 Toronto municipal election was held on November 10, 1980 in Metropolitan Toronto, Ontario, Canada. Mayors, controllers, city councillors and school board trustees were elected in the municipalities of Toronto, York, East York, North York, Etobicoke and Scarborough.

Art Eggleton narrowly defeated incumbent John Sewell to become Mayor of Toronto, and Mel Lastman was re-elected as Mayor of North York.

== Toronto ==
=== Mayoral race ===
In the 1978 election reform candidate John Sewell had won against two more conservative candidates. In 1980 election the right united around Art Eggleton, and he narrowly defeated Sewell.

Eggleton carried eight of the city's eleven wards, dominating in the west end, and prevailing in North Toronto and the east end by narrower margins. While Sewell increased his vote in every ward, he only carried three wards in the heart of the city: midtown's ward 5 (which included the city's Annex district), the downtown core (ward 6) and ward 7, which he had previously represented as an alderman.

Results
Art Eggleton - 87,919
John Sewell - 86,152
Anne McBride - 3,429
Bob Bush - 2,141
Fred Dunn - 1,100
Armand Siksna - 867
Ronald Rodgers - 846
Chris Faiers - 590
Andrejs Murnieks - 571

=== City council ===
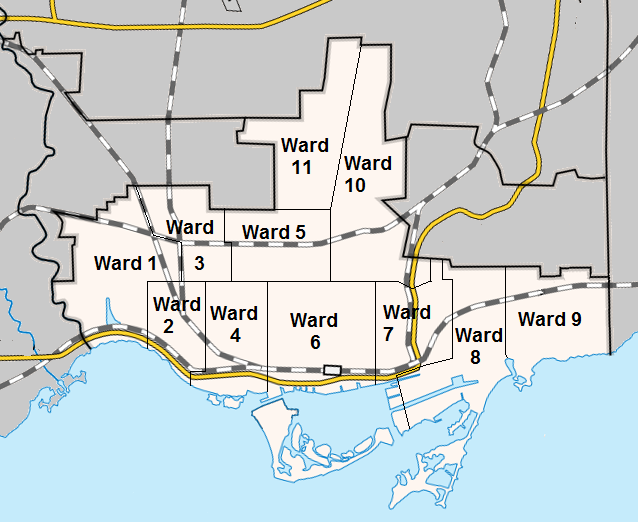
Ward boundaries used in the 1980 election

City council saw a handful of major upsets and was considered to have been moved to the right by the election as in addition to losing the mayoralty reformers lost their majority on council. The most notable upset was in the downtown Ward 6. Incumbent Allan Sparrow had stepped aside to allow George Hislop to run, in the belief that the large gay community in the ward deserved a representative on council. Hislop was one of the leading gay rights activists in the city, and his campaign was vigorously opposed by figures such as evangelist Ken Campbell. In a surprise upset Hislop lost to little known local dentist Gordon Chong.

Elsewhere the left won important victories. Tom Wardle Jr., who had been involved in several controversies including an assault conviction, was defeated by former councillor Dorothy Thomas. After four failed attempts Joe Pantalone won a seat on council by capturing the one vacated by Eggleton.

Top two from each ward elected to Toronto City Council. Top one from each ward also wins a seat on Metro Toronto council.

Ward 1 (Swansea and Bloor West Village)
William Boytchuk (incumbent) - 9,415
David White (incumbent) - 8,345
Bill Roberts - 5,785
Brynne Teal - 4,267
Nick Gulycz - 1,143
Yvette Tessier - 742
Michael Horner - 636

Ward 2 (Parkdale and Brockton)
Tony Ruprecht (incumbent) - 9,447
Ben Grys - 4,923
Susan Atkinson - 4,907
Elaine Ziemba - 4,137
Elaine Taylor - 684
John Lauter - 620

Ward 3 (Davenport and Corso Italia)
Joseph Piccininni (incumbent) - 7,509
Richard Gilbert (incumbent) - 7,363
Edward Gardner - 1,246
Mark Llewellyn - 689

Ward 4 (Trinity-Bellwoods and Little Italy)
Tony O'Donohue (incumbent) - 5,005
Joe Pantalone - 3,898
Tony Ianno - 3,362
Bill Moniz - 2,898
Barbara Hurd - 2,279
Nick Figliano - 704
Anthony Russo - 206

Ward 5 (The Annex and Yorkville)

1980 Toronto municipal election: Toronto City Councillor, Ward Five (two members elected)
Candidate	Votes	%
(x)Ying Hope	9,926	37.07
Ron Kanter	6,409	23.93
Menno Verster	5,777	21.57
David Scott	3,218	12.02
Jimmy Kabitsis	912	3.41
Vincent Corriero	537	2.01
Total valid votes	26,779	100.00

146 out of 148 polls reporting.

Ward 6 (Financial District, Toronto - University of Toronto)
Gordon Chong - 9,522
Dan Heap (incumbent) - 9,341
George Hislop - 7,348
Rose Smith - 2,959
Fred Chappell - 1,339
Darryl Randall - 659
Gary Weagle - 505

Ward 7 (Regent Park and Riverdale)
Gordon Cressy (incumbent) - 12,579
David Reville - 9,066
Frank Dwyer - 3,748
Thelma Forsyth - 2,632

Ward 8 (Riverdale)
Fred Beavis (incumbent) - 9,172
Thomas Clifford (incumbent) - 7,941
Jeanne McGuire - 1,433
James McMillan - 1,264
John Coutts - 550

Ward 9 (The Beaches)
Pat Sheppard (incumbent) - 10,236
Dorothy Thomas - 7,886
John Oliver - 6,102
Bob Yaccato - 5,321
Tom Wardle Jr. (incumbent) - 3,206
Winona Gallop - 915

Ward 10 (Rosedale and North Toronto)
June Rowlands (incumbent) - 17,551
Andrew Paton (incumbent) - 15,201
Patricia Bolton - 2,678
Craig Roberts - 2,367

Ward 11 (Forest Hill and North Toronto)
Anne Johnston (incumbent) - 15,168
Michael Gee (incumbent) - 13,410
Kay Gardner - 6,700
Susan Diamond - 1,447

Results are taken from the November 11, 1980 Toronto Star and might not exactly match final tallies.

== By-elections ==
Ward 2 Alderman Tony Ruprecht resigned to contest the 1981 provincial election. Ben Grys was appointed Metro Councillor on April 9. A by-election was held on May 25, 1981:

Chris Korwin-Kuczynski - 4,074
Irene Atkinson - 3,496
Susan Atkinson - 3,425
Bill McGinnis
Timmy Talpa
Henry Orgasinksi
Martin Amber

Ward 6 Alderman Dan Heap resigned having won a Federal by-election for Spadina on 17 August 1981. A by-election was held on October 19, 1981:

John Sewell - 7,278
Gus Young - 1,741
John Curtin - 628
Stanley Anderson - 599
Jay Saint - 181
Jaroslawa Baczkowska - 166
Martin Amber - 130
Jimmy Talpa - 34
Gary Weagle - 45

== East York ==
Alan Redway won his third term in office as mayor. All the incumbent councillors were re-elected. The only newcomer to council was Mike Wyatt in ward two.

† denotes incumbent from previous council

=== Mayor ===
- †Alan Redway - 19,971
- James Smith - 2,290

=== Council ===
Two to be elected from each ward

Ward 1

- †Dave Johnson - 5,530
- †Cy Reader - 4,994
- Edward Shaw - 1,403

Ward 2

- †Norm Crone - 3,703
- Mike Wyatt - 2,230
- George Vasilopoulos - 2,079
- Joe Tropiano - 1,674

Ward 3

- †Gordon Crann - Acclaimed
- †Ken Paige - Acclaimed

Ward 4

- †Peter Oyler - 3,947
- †Herbert McGroarty - 3,001
- Edna Beange - 2,752

=== Board of education ===
Two to be elected from each ward

Ward 1

- †Gord Brown - 4,453
- †Ruth Goldhar - 3,135
- Bruce Porter - 1,856

Ward 2

- †James Palmer - 2,901
- †Kenneth Maxted - 2,441
- Fred Jackson - 1,088
- Chad Dakin - 900

Ward 3

- †Margaret Hazelton - 2,645
- †William Phillips - 2,603
- Len Self - 1,929

Ward 4

- Michael Globe - Acclaimed
- Steven Overgard - Acclaimed

=== Hydro Commission ===
Two to be elected

- †Jack Christie - 13,780
- Frank Johnson - 10,036
- †Al Morgan - 7,569

== Etobicoke ==
=== Mayor ===
- †Dennis Flynn - 35,955
- Morley Kells - 30,110
- Pete McCluskey - 2,275

(762 out of 833 polls)

(Source: Globe and Mail, 11 Nov 1980, pg 12)

=== Board of Control ===
Four to be elected

- †Winfield (Bill) Stockwell - 45,580
- †Bruce Sinclair - 35,074
- Dick O'Brien - 29,916
- David Lacey - 28,750
- †Nora Pownall - 27,211
- Bob Wigmore - 13,032
- Roz McKenna - 12,270
- Greta McNabney - 9,095

(762 out of 833 polls)

(Source: Globe and Mail, 11 Nov 1980, pg 12)

== North York ==
=== Mayor ===
- (incumbent)Mel Lastman 76,274
- Howard Cohen 12,243

(1257 of 1379 polls)

=== Board of Control ===
- (incumbent)Esther Shiner 55,986
- (incumbent)Robert Yuill 44,544
- William Sutherland 36,562
- Norm Gardner 36,402
- (incumbent)Irv Paisley 35,590
- Jane McGivern 29,934
- Frank Esposito 17,643
- Donna Wilson 17,104
- Bernadette Michael 11,604

(1257 of 1379 polls)

=== City Council ===
1980 Toronto municipal election: North York Councillor, Ward Four
Candidate	Votes	%
(x)Howard Moscoe	4,320	66.99
Cary Fox	1,247	19.34
Gus Cusimano	882	13.68
Total valid votes	6,449	100.00

75 out of 78 polls reporting.

Mario Gentile was re-elected as Ward 2 councillor.

- Cary Fox was an insurance agent, who called for a crackdown on vandalism and accused Howard Moscoe of seeking the media spotlight too often.
- Gus Cusimano was a perennial candidate for municipal office in North York. He sought election to the North York City Council in the 1974, 1976, 1978 and 1980 elections, losing each time. Cusimano was eighteen years old during his first campaign. He is an insurance agent, and accused Moscoe of seeking the media spotlight too often in the 1980. A 1987 newspaper article identifies him as president of City-Wide Insurance Ltd., Willowdale. As of 2006, he is president of Petek Insurance.

== Scarborough ==
In Scarborough, Gus Harris retained his role as Mayor Scarborough. All Board of Control members were re-elected except Frank Faubert. All incumbent aldermen were returned to office. Faubert was returned to office in a by-election as alderman for Ward 5 when Alan Robinson was elected to provincial office in the 1981 Ontario election.

=== Mayor ===
(incumbent)Gus Harris - 47,440
John Wimbs - 30,718
Frank Visconti - 4,687

(1103 out of 1110 polls)

=== Board of Control ===
(incumbent)Brian Harrison - 48,933
Ken Morrish - 41,169
(incumbent)Carol Ruddell - 40,637
(incumbent)Joyce Trimmer - 40,564
(incumbent)Frank Faubert - 40,386
Bob Watson - 22,124
John MacMillan - 16,782

(1103 out of 1110 polls)

=== Borough Aldermen ===
Ward 1
Bill Belfontaine (incumbent)

Ward 2
Barry Christensen

Ward 3
David Dinkworth

Ward 4
Jack Goodlad (acclaimed)

Ward 5
Alan Robinson (incumbent), Frank Faubert after May 25, 1981

Ward 6
Florence Cruikshank

Ward 7
Ed Fulton (incumbent)

Ward 8
Shirley Eidt (incumbent)

Ward 9
Doug Colling (incumbent)

Ward 10
Maureen Prinsloo (incumbent)

Ward 11
Ron Watson

Ward 12
Joe Dekort (incumbent)

== York ==
In the borough of York, Gayle Christie was re-elected for a second term as Mayor defeating Alan Tonks by a wide margin.

The five aldermen who ran again were re-elected. Tony Mandarano and James Trimbee were the only new members of York Council.

=== Mayor ===
(incumbent)Gayle Christie 21,470
Alan Tonks 13,674

=== Board of Control (2 elected) ===
(incumbent)Fergy Brown 19,489
Philip White 17,165
Harriet Wolman 12,834

=== Council ===
Ward 1
Ben Nobleman 1,870
Michael Colle 1,108
Jay Bell 529
Dan Goldberg 329
A.E. Stollard 213

Ward 2
Tony Mandarano 2,199
Gord Garland 1,045

Ward 3
Ron Bradd 2,108
Tony Rizzo 1,448

Ward 4
Patrick Canavan 1,426
Gary D'Onofrio 1,074

Ward 5
Chris Tonks (acclaimed)

Ward 6
James Trimbee 3,506
Robert MacPherson 2,014

Ward 7
John Nunziata 4,547
Marvin Gordon 743
Frank Ruffolo 621
Vince DeNardo 158
