= List of reeves and mayors of Scarborough, Ontario =

This is a list of reeves and mayors of Scarborough, Ontario in Canada. The township of Scarborough was created in 1850. The head of the local government was a reeve until the incorporation of Scarborough as a borough in 1967, at which point the head of the local government was styled as mayor and continued after becoming a city in 1983. Since 1998, Scarborough has been a community within the city of Toronto, and the head of the local government is the Mayor of Toronto.

== Township Reeves ==
No.	Name	Term	Notes
1	Peter Secor	1850	Former postmaster
2	John P. Wheler	1851-1853	
3	John Torrance	1854	Surveyor and owner of several farms
2	John P. Wheler	1855-1864	Second term
4	Donald G. Stephenson	1865	Farmer
5	Thomas Brown	1866	
6	George Chester	1867-1870	
2	John P. Wheler	1871-1875	Third term
6	George Chester	1876	Second term
4	Donald G. Stephenson	1877-1880	Second term
7	John Richardson	1881-1894	related to later reeves JG Cornell, and to Albert Campbell's wife.
8	James Chester	1895	
9	Lyman Kennedy	1896-1901	
10	Alfred Young	1902-1907	
11	William D. Annis	1908-1912	
12	James George Cornell	1913-1919	related to settler William Cornell, and uncle of Albert Campbell's wife.
13	James T. Steward	1920-1921	
14	E. M. Croker	1922	
15	Robert McCowan	1923-1925	
16	T. E. Allen	1926	
17	George Moore	1927	
18	George Burnfield Little	1928-1931	
19	F. L. Barchard	1932	
20	T. H. Sanders	1933-1934	
17	George Moore	1935	Second term
21	B. J. Wheeler	1936-1938	
22	Burton L. Clutterbuck	1939-1945	
23	Allan P. Wheler	1946	
24	R. H. Palmer	1947	
25	Oliver E. Crockford	1948-1955	
26	Gus Harris	1956	Later served as Mayor of Scarborough
27	Albert Campbell	1956-1967	Final Reeve of Scarborough

== Borough Mayors ==
After 1967, the title of reeve of the Township of Scarborough was changed to the Mayor of the Borough of Scarborough. Scarborough became a city in 1983 with the former mayor of the borough becoming mayor of the city. After 1998, the Mayor of Scarborough ceased to exist and was replaced by the Mayor of Toronto.

No.	Name	Term	Notes
1	Albert Campbell	1967-1969	Resigned to become Metro Chairman
2	Robert W. White	1969-1972	
3	Paul Cosgrove	1973-1978	Resigned to become a Liberal MP, later served as a cabinet minister and a judge
—	Ken Morrish	1978	Interim
4	Gus Harris	1979-1988	Became a city mayor in 1983
5	Joyce Trimmer	1988-1994	First woman elected Mayor of Scarborough
6	Frank Faubert	1994-1998	

== Board of Control ==
Scarborough had a Board of Control from 1966 until it was abolished with the 1988 election and replaced by directly elected Metro Councillors. The Board of Control consisted of four Controllers elected at large and the mayor and served as the executive committee of Scarborough Council. Controllers concurrently sat on Metropolitan Toronto Council

Names in boldface indicate Controllers that were or became Mayor of Scarborough in other years.

X = elected as Controller
A = appointed Controller to fill a vacancy

M = sitting as Mayor

=== From 1966 to abolition ===
Elections to the Board of Control for Scarborough (1966–1985)
Controller	1966	1969	1972	1974	1976	1978	1980	1982	1985
**Albert Campbell**	M								
**Robert W. White**	X	M							
**Gus Harris**	X	X	X	X	X	M	M	M	M
Brian Harrison	X	X	X	X	X	X	X	X	
Karl Mallette	X	X	X						
Ken Morrish		X	X	X	X		X		X
**Paul Cosgrove**			M	M	M				
**Joyce Trimmer**				X	X	X	X	X	X
**Frank Faubert**					A	X		X	X
Carol Ruddell						X	X	X	
Bill Belfontaine									X
