= 1976 Toronto municipal election =

Canadian municipal election

1976 Toronto mayoral election
- December 6, 1976
- Turnout: 30.5%
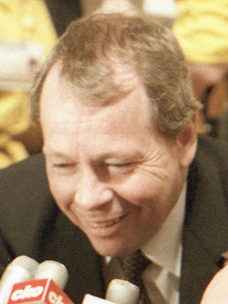

Candidate	David Crombie	Don Andrews
Popular vote	112,763	7,126
Percentage	83%	5.3%
Mayor of Toronto before election
David Crombie
Elected Mayor of Toronto
David Crombie

The Toronto municipal election of 1976 was held on December 6, 1976 in Metropolitan Toronto, Ontario, Canada. Mayors, city councillors and school board trustees were elected in the municipalities of Toronto, York, East York, North York, Etobicoke and Scarborough.

Toronto Mayor David Crombie and North York Mayor Mel Lastman were both re-elected without serious opposition.

== Toronto ==
=== Mayoral race ===
As in the 1974 election incumbent David Crombie faced no real opposition in his bid for reelection.

Results
David Crombie - 112,763
Don Andrews - 7,126
Henry Argasinski - 3,760
Richard Sanders - 2,373
Judy Lucko - 1,863
Ronald Rodgers - 1,613
Bill Zock - 1,506
Harry Dahme - 1,223
Robert Simms - 1,152
Andreis Murvieks - 962

=== City council ===
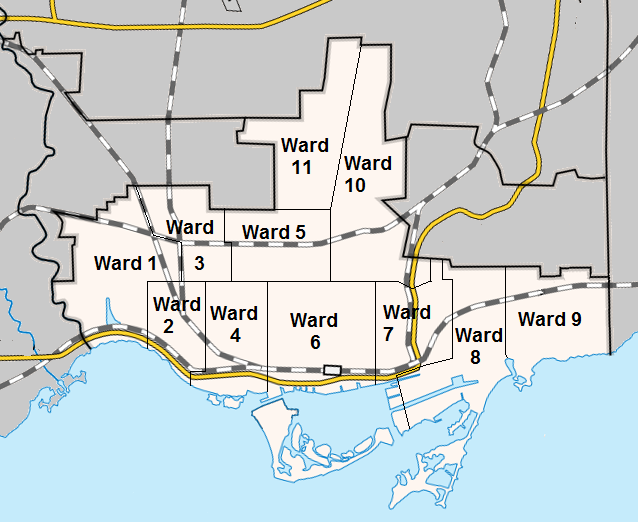
Ward boundaries used in the 1976 election

City council was mostly stable, the only notable upset was the defeat of long serving Old Guard member William Boytchuk by NDPer David White in Ward 1. The conservative membership remained stable as retiring moderate NDPer Reid Scott was replaced by conservative Tom Wardle Jr.

Two aldermen were elected per Ward. The alderman with the most votes was declared Senior Alderman and sat on both Toronto City Council and Metro Council.

Ward 1 (Swansea and Bloor West Village)
Elizabeth Eayrs (incumbent) - 7,656
David White - 5,932
William Boytchuk (incumbent) - 5,883
Ben Grys - 4,420
Amonsen - 1,314
Ed Homonyla - 1,237

Ward 2 (Parkdale and Brockton)
Tony O'Donohue (incumbent) - 7,656
Ed Negridge (incumbent) - 4,545
Barbara Adams - 3,005
Glen Bany - 2,912
Pat Bator - 1,786

Ward 3 (Davenport and Corso Italia)
Joseph Piccininni (incumbent) - 5,826
Richard Gilbert - 4,651
Tony Amond - 1,464
Slough Bolton - 1,457
Domenic Tersigni - 545

Ward 4 (Trinity-Bellwoods and Little Italy)
Art Eggleton (incumbent) - 4,615
George Ben (incumbent) - 2,957
Joe Pantalone - 2,713
Lee Zaslofsky - 1,940
Sydney Pimentel - 563
Brian Ashley - 379

Ward 5 (The Annex and Yorkville)
Ying Hope (incumbent) - 7,097
Susan Fish - 5,201
Fiona Nelson - 4,731
Barbara Jacob - 2,061
Brian Ashton - 1,796
Alex McDonald - 1,199
Norman Elder - 1,086

Ward 6 (Financial District, Toronto - University of Toronto)
Dan Heap (incumbent) - 8,503
Allan Sparrow (incumbent) - 8,103
Peter Budd - 4,448
Arnold Linelsky - 2,046

Ward 7 (Regent Park and Riverdale)
John Sewell (incumbent) - 8,786
Janet Howard (incumbent) - 6,460
Gary Stamm - 4,419
Ronald Taylor - 770
Charles Rolfe - 767

Ward 8 (Riverdale)
Fred Beavis (incumbent) - 7,193
Thomas Clifford (incumbent) - 6,883
Beatrice Zaverucha - 1,062
Louis Kesten - 951
John Bizzell - 771
Joe Dabonte - 458

Ward 9 (The Beaches)
Pat Sheppard - 4,949
Tom Wardle, Jr. - 4,948
Bruce Budd - 4,665
Joe McNulty - 4,446
William Ross - 3,094
Neil Young - 2,114
John Oliver - 1,766
Sharon Meecham - 735
Edmond Cameron - 432
George Sloan - 344
Tom Last - 232

Ward 10 (Rosedale and North Toronto)
John Bosley (incumbent) - 11,638
June Rowlands - 11,307
Robert Perkins - 5,079
David White - 1,517

Ward 11 (Forest Hill and North Toronto)
David Smith (incumbent) - 12,441
Anne Johnston (incumbent) - 11,600
Russ Tandler - 1,412
Fay MacPerson - 1,283

=== Changes ===
Mayor David Crombie resigned on August 31, 1978 to contest a Federal by-election for Rosedale on October 16, 1978. On September 1, 1978 City Council met to appoint a new Mayor. The right-wingers stood Ward 8 Alderman Fred Beavis while the left-wingers stood Ward 11 Alderman Anne Johnston. When the vote was held the two candidates were tied with 11 votes each so in accordance with the Municipal Act put both names into a hat, and the name picked out of the hat would officially be pronounced interim mayor. Fred Beavis was the name chosen and he became mayor. Thomas Clifford now became Ward 8's sole Alderman and was appointed Metro Councillor on September 11.

== Metro boroughs ==
=== East York ===
Results from the borough of East York. Two aldermen were elected to each ward.

Mayor
Alan Redway - 12,092
Howard Chandler - 11,138

Ward 1
Dave Johnson - 4,568
Leslie Saunders - 2,758
Cy Reader - 2,156
Mike Kenny - 1,339
Stephen Milne - 732
Bill Segritt - 369

Ward 2
John Flowers - 2,977
Norman Crane - 2,326
Arthur Shart - 1,257
Marg Reilly - 1,211
Robert MacKenzie - 595
Frank Johnson - 465
James McKinnon - 412
Chris Greenland - 353

Ward 3
Ray Ireland - 2,644
Don van Mierlo - 2,577
Jack Irwin - 1,815
Ken Steele - 1,368
Gordon Crann - 1,357

Ward 4
Edna Beange - 3,477
Peter Oyler - 2,777
Herbert McGroarty - 2,497
Harry Wilsher - 1,396

Source: Toronto Star, December 7, 1976, page A11.

=== Etobicoke ===
Results from Etobicoke. Four members were elected to the Board of Control. Two aldermen were elected to each ward.

Mayor
(incumbent)Dennis Flynn - 46,550
Juris Ditevko - 7,559

Board of Control
(incumbent)Bill Stockwell - 34,782
(incumbent)Bruce Sinclair - 30,411
(incumbent)Nora Pownall - 26,918
(incumbent)E. H. (Pete) Farrow - 26,357
John Allen - 23,213
Ron Barr- 13,027
Keith Gallacher - 10,038

Ward 1
Helen Wursta
Morley Kells

Ward 2
Alex Marchetti
Stewart East

Ward 3
Dick O'Brien
Alex McNeil

Ward 4
Lois Griffin
John Hanna

Ward 5
Ruth Grier
Pat Keaveney

Source: Toronto Star, December 7, 1976, page A11.

=== North York ===
Mayor
(incumbent)Mel Lastman - 60,093
William Sutherland - 15,634
Pallotta - 3,376
Obadia - 1,088
Minty - 920

(1019 out of 1305 polls)

Lastman is re-elected defeating a challenge by Controller William Sutherland

Board of Control
(incumbent)Barbara Greene - 52,053
Esther Shiner - 39,768
Ron Summers - 32,616
Bob Yuill - 31,050
Alex McGivern - 30,110
Jack Bedder - 20,267
Bernadette Michael - 13,803
Angelo Natale -10,281

(1019 out of 1305 polls)

Ward 1
Gord Risk

Ward 2
Mario Gentile

Ward 3
Pat O'Neill

1976 Toronto municipal election: North York Councillor, Ward Four
Candidate	Votes	%
Murray Markin	2,073	40.31
Hugh Montgomerie	1,016	19.76
Jean Lance	959	18.65
Martin Lewin	745	14.49
Harbans Varma	350	6.81
Total valid votes	5,143	100.00

61 out of 77 polls reporting.

- Hugh Montgomerie was a forty-three-year-old film technician. He recommended a ban on high-density development projects that did not have adequate recreation facilities.
- Martin Lewin was a thirty-two-year-old sales manager. He argued that shoppers in major plazas should not be forced to pay parking fees.
- Harbans Rai Varma was a fifty-year-old supply teacher. He called for lower employment and inflation levels, and for improved race relations. He campaigned for the North York Board of Education in 1980, and lost to Elsa Chandler in Ward Four. A candidate named "Rai Varma" ran for the Markham Board of Control in 1991; this may be the same person.

Ward 5
Marilyn Meshberg

Ward 6
Milton Berger

Ward 7
Irving Chapley

Ward 8
Alan Heisey

Ward 9
Norm Gardner

Ward 10
Marie Laballe

Ward 11
Peter Clarke

Ward 12
Barry Burton

Ward 13
Mike Smith

Ward 14
Betty Sutherland

=== Scarborough ===
Results from the Borough of Scarborough. Four members were elected to the Board of Control. One alderman was elected to each ward.

Mayor
(incumbent)Paul Cosgrove - 51,859
Lois James - 6,526

Board of Control
(incumbent)Gus Harris - 35,525
(incumbent)Ken Morrish - 35,243
(incumbent)Joyce Trimmer - 31,358
(incumbent)Brian Harrison - 30,956
Shirley Eidt - 28,363
Grant Boucher - 10,061
Larry Calcutt - 8,321
John Fletcher - 7,770

Ward 1
Bill Belfontaine

Ward 2
Carol Ruddell

Ward 3
Norm Kelly

Ward 4
Jack Goodlad

Ward 5
Frank Faubert

Ward 6
Frederick Samuel Bland

Ward 7
Ed Fulton

Ward 8
Tom Brazier

Ward 9
Doug Colling

Ward 10
Ron Watson

Ward 11
John Wimbs

Ward 12
Joe De Kort

=== York ===
Results from the borough of York. Two members were elected to the Board of Control. One alderman was elected to each ward.

Mayor
Philip White 14,711
Fergy Brown 14,443

Board of Control (2 elected)
Doug Saunders 14,549
Alan Tonks 11,998
Patrick Canavan 7,479
Gordon 6,229
Ciardullo 3,572

Ward 1
Ben Nobleman (acclaimed)

Ward 2
Oscar Kogan (acclaimed)

Ward 3
Ron Bradd
Mizzoni 934
D'Aprile 825

Ward 4
Clifford Ward 1,532
Howells 693

Ward 5
Chris Tonks (acclaimed)

Ward 6
Floyd Sainsbury 2,386
Dodds 2,187

Ward 7
Gayle Christie 2,853
Gallichan 1,484
McMahon 373

Ward 8
Mike Waclawski 2,987
John Nunziata 1,920
