= 1978 Toronto municipal election =

Mayoral election in Toronto

1978 Toronto mayoral election
- November 13, 1978
- Turnout: 46.4%
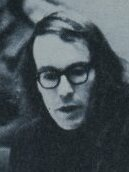

Candidate	John Sewell	Tony O'Donohue	David Smith
Popular vote	71,885	62,173	45,071
Percentage	38%	33%	24%
Mayor of Toronto before election
Fred Beavis
Elected Mayor of Toronto
John Sewell

The Toronto municipal election of 1978, held on Monday, November 13, 1978, was the first seriously contested mayoralty race in Toronto, Ontario, Canada, since David Crombie took office in the 1972 election. Crombie left municipal politics earlier in 1978 to seek and win a seat in the House of Commons of Canada as the Progressive Conservative Member of Parliament for Rosedale electoral district.

== Toronto ==
=== Mayoral race ===
The contest to succeed Crombie (or more correctly, interim Mayor Fred Beavis) was a wide-open affair that saw three aldermen, David Smith, Tony O'Donohue and John Sewell contest the position.

Though O'Donohue and Smith were both aligned with the Liberals with links to developers, O'Donohue was seen as more right-wing and won the endorsement of the conservative Toronto Sun newspaper, while Smith was seen as more of a centrist.

Sewell had first been elected to Toronto city council in 1969 and had a reputation as a community activist and even a radical. His backers consisted of New Democratic Party supporters (although Sewell himself has never been a member of the party), left-wing Liberals and Red Tories, many of whom had supported Crombie who, despite his Tory allegiance, had a reputation as a reform mayor on the left wing of the municipal political spectrum.

The split on the right between O'Donohue and Smith allowed Sewell to win with less than 50% of the vote.

Sewell received strong support from younger voters, tenants, and the highly educated and affluent. He carried midtown (ward 5), the downtown (wards 6 and 7, the latter of which he represented as an alderman), the east end (wards 8 and 9) and one of the city's wealthy northern wards (ward 10). O'Donohue won the working class, heavily Catholic and ethnic west end (wards 1-4), one of which he represented as an alderman; Sewell fared poorly in the west end. Smith narrowly beat Sewell in the northern ward 11, which he had represented as an alderman.

Results
John Sewell - 71,885
Tony O'Donohue - 62,173
David Smith - 45,071
Joe Martin - 1,658
Ron Morawski - 1,546
John Beattle - 1,239
Louis Thomas - 826
Richard Sanders - 778
Zoltan Szoboszloi - 439
Hardial Dhir - 379
Walter Lohaza - 336
Andries Murnieks - 323

=== City council ===
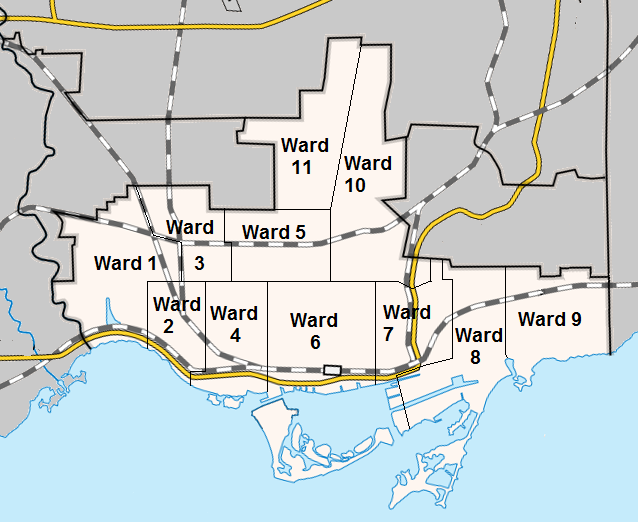
Ward boundaries used in the 1978 election

Top two from each ward elected to Toronto City Council. Top one from each ward also wins a seat on Metro Toronto council.

Ward 1 (Swansea and Bloor West Village)
(incumbent)David White - 8,087
William Boytchuk - 7,379
Audrey Jardine - 5,281
Diane Fancher - 4,943
Io Amoneen - 4,457
Aiden Buckley - 1,209

Ward 2 (Parkdale and Brockton)
Tony Ruprecht - 4,843
Barbara Adams - 4,582
Thor Wons - 3,457
Chris Korwin - 3,008
Les Wawrow - 1,959
Glen Bany - 1,956
Bob Grossi - 1,237
Frank Bray - 299
Larry Daoust - 141

Ward 3 (Davenport and Corso Italia)
(incumbent)Joseph Piccininni - 7,566
(incumbent)Richard Gilbert - 6,377
Joe Renda - 2,616
Tony Amono - 1,071
Tina Martin - 732

Ward 4 (Trinity-Bellwoods and Little Italy)
(incumbent)Art Eggleton - 4,961
(incumbent)George Ben - 3,402
Joe Pantalone - 3,251
John Medeiros - 1,844
Tony Ianno - 1,807
Bill Moniz - 1,398
Manuel Alves - 671
Robert Taddeo - 547
Joe Pimental - 341
Manuel Garcia - 330

Ward 5 (The Annex and Yorkville)
(incumbent)Ying Hope - 11,870
(incumbent)Susan Fish - 11,505
Frank Severino - 2,056

Ward 6 (Financial District, Toronto - University of Toronto)
(incumbent)Allan Sparrow - 8,029
(incumbent)Dan Heap - 7,514
Dan Richards - 6,421
Rose Smith - 2,785
Joe Martin - 1,143

Ward 7 (Regent Park and Riverdale)
Gordon Cressy - 11,869
(incumbent)Janet Howard - 9,533
George Patton - 4,258
Randall Parsons - 837
Charles Rolfe - 573
Steve Necheff - 483

Ward 8 (Riverdale)
(incumbent)Fred Beavis - 7,997
(incumbent)Thomas Clifford - 7,205
Charlotte Stuart - 5,097
Chris Toutounis - 2,933
Beatrice Zeveruche - 691
Louis Kostan - 493
Jim McMillan - 376
Vincent Corriero - 267
Elizabeth Parsons - 253
Alex Yaung - 189

Ward 9 (The Beaches)
(incumbent)Pat Sheppard - 9,248
(incumbent)Tom Wardle, Jr. - 8,815
Brian Fullerton - 7,489
Bruce Budd - 7,113
Sharon Meecham - 2,366
Charles Martin - 396

Ward 10 (Rosedale and North Toronto)
(incumbent)June Rowlands - 15,790
Andrew Paton - 14,980
Harvey Dyck - 8,911
Neil Agnoo - 640

Ward 11 (Forest Hill and North Toronto)
(incumbent)Anne Johnston - 14,996
Michael Gee - 11,395
Kay Gardner - 8,485
Eunice Grayson - 6,115
Dennis Hunt - 1,388

=== By-elections ===
Ward 4 Alderman George Ben died on December 17, 1978. A by-election was held on February 26, 1979:

Tony O'Donohue: 4,699
Joe Pantalone - 4,361
Tony Marchese - 413
Mike Lotosky - 87
Richard Sanders - 40

== East York ==
=== Mayor ===
Alan Redway (acclaimed)

== Etobicoke ==
=== Mayor ===
(incumbent)Dennis Flynn - 46,680
Terry Howes - 12,903
Alexander Masur - 4,941

(783 out of 815 polls)

=== Board of Control ===
(four to be elected)

(incumbent)Bill Stockwell - 48,336
(incumbent)Bruce Sinclair - 39,525
(incumbent)Nora Pownall - 35,888
Morley Kells - 35,786
(incumbent)E. H. (Pete) Farrow - 31,067

(783 out of 815 polls)

== North York ==
Mel Lastman was re-elected mayor receiving the most votes ever recorded for a North York mayor. Barbara Greene, Esther Shiner and Robert Yuill were re-elected to Board of Control with Irving Paisley taking the fourth seat. Greene received the most votes for a Board of Control member which carries the post of deputy mayor. Some analysts thought that her chances of retaining the position may have been hurt by her becoming a single mother in the previous year. In the ward races, three incumbents were ousted including Mario Sergio over Gord Risk in Ward 1; Howard Moscoe over Murray Markin in Ward 4; and Mike Foster over Marilyn Meshberg in Ward 5. Elinor Caplan won in ward 13 to replace Mike Smith who retired from council. (Note: Many of the vote totals are listed from incomplete polling. None of the results were overturned when complete votes were tallied.)

=== Mayor ===
(incumbent)Mel Lastman - 83,811
Perry Dane - 11,396
Helena Obadia - 5,646

=== Board of Control ===
(four to be elected)

(incumbent)Barbara Greene - 57,808
(incumbent)Esther Shiner - 55,429
(incumbent)Robert Yuill - 44,748
Irving Paisley - 34,648
Ron Summers - 34,514
Alex McGivern - 33,602
Harvey Haber - 18,228
Paul Wizman - 14,221
Doreen Leitch - 9,791
Gino Vatri - 9,729
Sheena Suttaby - 6,049

=== Council ===
Ward 1
Mario Sergio - 2,224
(incumbent)Gord Risk - 1,945
Sheila Lambrinos - 1,468

Ward 2
(incumbent)Mario Gentile - 5,155
Rocco Cossidente - 1,332

Ward 3
(incumbent)Pat O'Neill - 2,915
Peter Pallotta - 1,882
Derek Warner - 806
Roy Wilcox - 325

1978 Toronto municipal election: North York Councillor, Ward Four
Candidate	Votes	%	Notes
Howard Moscoe	2,757	45.74	High school teacher
(x)Murray Markin	1,934	32.09	Incumbent
Eleanor Rosen	630	10.45	
Jean Lance	447	7.42	Tenant activist
Alan Mostyn	259	4.30	Lawyer
Total valid votes	6,027	100.00	

Ward 5
Michael Foster - 3,877
(incumbent)Marilyn Meshberg - 3,620
Amerigo Petruzzo - 1,430
Judy Taylor - 594

Ward 6
(incumbent)Milton Berger - Acclaimed

Ward 7
(incumbent)Irving Chapley - 5,218
Jack Bedder - 2,447

Ward 8
(incumbent)Alan Heisey - Acclaimed

Ward 9
(incumbent)Norman Gardner - 5,914
Morry Smith - 3,526

Ward 10
(incumbent)Marie Labatte - 4,689
Allan Payne - 1,663

Ward 11
(incumbent)Peter Clarke - 3,853
Shirley Scaife - 3,465
Howard Cohen - 714

Ward 12
(incumbent)Barry Burton - 4,238
Gus Cusimano - 2,143
Norman Brudy - 1,098

Ward 13
Elinor Caplan - 4,416
Dan Pickett - 2,057
Paul McCann - 782
Alec Davis - 733
Bernadette Michael - 324
Sudhi Shankar Menon - 166

Ward 14
(incumbent)Betty Sutherland - Acclaimed

=== Public school trustee ===
Ward 1
Jo Treasure - 1,463
Jack Sweet - 1,365

Ward 2
Peg Grant - Acclaimed

Ward 3
Peggy Gemmell - 1,176
Elizabeth Smith - 1,170
Bev Folkes - 640

Ward 4
Else Chandler - 2,970
Ben Treos - 644
Sherland Chhangur - 288

Ward 5
George McCleary - Acclaimed

Ward 6
Frances Chapkin - 2,144
Zale Newman - 965
Ian Lovatt - 881
Robert Howse - 716
Peter Beecham - 334
Vladimir Machlis - 126

Ward 7
Mae Waese - 2,654
Adam Fuerstenberg - 2,121
Leon Stalner - 971
Alan Simons - 840
Morley Philips - 761
Charles Stewart - 375

Ward 8
Marilyn Knowles - 2,586
Diane Betts - 1,946
John Buttrick - 617
Charles Kasner - 483
Judy Mandel - 265
Phil Reeve - 250
Morris Atlas - 151

Ward 9
Neil Strauss - 3,704
Harold Koehler - 2,877
George Hamell - 1,265
Irwin Krakowsky - 357

Ward 10
Sybil Darnell - 2,306
William Gruber - 1,357
David Reed - 1,330

Ward 11
Marion Gordon - 3,733
Edward Reiken - 994
George Malner - 844
Ken Stagg - 716

Ward 12
Ken Crowley - 3,724
Althea Collins-Poulos - 1,093

Ward 13
Lawrence Krackower - 2,844
Gerald Wiseman - 1,905
Ralph Benner - 1,725
Victoria Sibila - 392

Ward 14
Martin Park - 3,964
Serj Assadourian - 1,063

=== Hydro Commission ===
(two to be elected)

Bill Sutherland - 41,561
Carl Anderson - 28,750
Paul Adler - 21,904
D'Arcy McConvey - 18,907
Mollie Goodbaum - 15,189
Norman Baird - 12,984
David Horwood - 7,065
Nicholas Tryphonopoulos - 5,350

== Scarborough ==
Gus Harris won his first term as mayor defeating interim mayor Ken Morrish by 3,000 votes. Morrish was appointed interim mayor after Paul Cosgrove resigned to run federally. Incumbent controllers Brian Harrison, Joyce Trimmer and Frank Faubert were all re-elected while alderman Carol Ruddell took the fourth spot. Shirley Eidt returned to council after beating one term alderman Brian Brazier. Newcomers include Wally Majesky (Ward 2), Alan Robinson (Ward 5), and Maureen Prinsloo (Ward 10).

=== Mayor ===
Gus Harris - 33,483
(incumbent)Ken Morrish - 29,908
Ron Watson - 13,822
Lois James - 4,241
Donald Lunny -2.404

=== Board of Control ===
(Four to be elected)

(incumbent)Brian Harrison - 50,728
(incumbent)Joyce Trimmer - 44,502
Carol Ruddell - 42,299
(incumbent)Frank Faubert - 39,897
Bob Watson - 28,121
Jim Bryers - 22,594
John Tsopelas - 9,768
Greg McGroarty - 9,218

=== Council ===
Ward 1
(incumbent)Bill Belfontaine - 5,326
Doug Varsey - 2,067

Ward 2
Wally Majesky - 2,736
Don MacMillan - 2,374
Gordon McMillen - 993
Doug Springhope - 838

Ward 3
(incumbent)Norm Kelly - Acclaimed

Ward 4
(incumbent)Jack Goodlad - Acclaimed

Ward 5
Alan Robinson - 2,465
Gord Ashberry - 2,113
Don Hillard - 1,203

Ward 6
(incumbent)Frederick Bland - 4,562
Joe Zammit - 2,326

Ward 7
(incumbent)Ed Fulton - 4,359
Joe Crowley - 2,530
Elizabeth McKenzie - 1,938

Ward 8
Shirley Eidt - 4,137
(incumbent)Tom Brazier - 3,738

Ward 9
(incumbent)Doug Colling - Acclaimed

Ward 10
Maureen Prinsloo - 2,991
Harry Murphy - 1,845
Scott MacPherson - 1,405
Arne Boye - 749
Larry Calcutt - 622
Ken Wayne - 382

Ward 11
(incumbent)John Wimbs - Acclaimed

Ward 12
(incumbent)Joe DeKort - 3,823
Jack Heads - 967

== York ==
In the borough of York, Gayle Christie defeated Philip White who had been Mayor since 1969.

Mayor
Gayle Christie 15,732
Philip White 14,050
Douglas Saunders 8,322

Board of Control (2 elected)
Fergy Brown (Acclaimed)
Alan Tonks (Acclaimed)

Ward 1
Ben Nobleman (Acclaimed)

Ward 2
Oscar Kogan 1,429
Tony Mandarano 1,326
Marvin Gordon 351
Deanna Michael 243

Ward 3
Ron Bradd 2,217
Nino D'Apria 1,762

Ward 4
Patrick Canavan 1,106
Cillard Ward 1,045
Enzo Ragno 744

Ward 5
Chris Tonks 2,330
Hilde Zimmer 1,176

Ward 6
Lois Lane 2,520
Lloyd Sainsbury 2,250
Buzz Fedunchak 1,056

Ward 7
John Nunziata 2,019
Don Kendal 1,843
Harold Stuart 1,051
Mario Ruffolo 981
Alex Dulkewych 415
