= Fergy Brown =

Canadian politician (1923–2013)

Mayor of York
- In office 1988–1994
- Preceded by: Alan Tonks
- Succeeded by: Frances Nunziata

York Board of Control
- In office 1978–1988

York City Councillor for Ward 4
- In office 1969–1974

Personal details
- Born: James Fergus Brown; 31 October 1923 Glasgow, Scotland
- Died: 3 April 2013 (aged 89) Toronto, Ontario
- Education: University of Toronto
- Occupation: Business owner, pharmacist

James Fergus Brown (31 October 1923 – 3 April 2013) was a politician in Toronto, Ontario, Canada. He served as Mayor of York from 1988 to 1994.

== Background ==
Brown was born in Scotland, and moved to the neighbourhood of Mount Dennis in York, Toronto at age five. He served in Canada's Bomber Command during World War II, took pharmacy studies at the University of Toronto, and owned a pharmacy before entering politics.

== Political career ==
Brown was first elected to the York Borough Council in 1969, defeating three challengers in the city's fourth ward, and was re-elected in 1972.

He campaigned for Mayor of York in 1974 and 1976, but lost to Philip White both times. He also ran for a seat in the Legislative Assembly of Ontario in 1977 as a candidate of the Progressive Conservative Party, finishing second against New Democratic Party incumbent Tony Grande in Oakwood. In January 1978, he was appointed by Premier Bill Davis to the Metro Toronto and Region Conservation Authority.

After a four-year absence, Brown returned to York Council in 1978, winning election to the city's Board of Control. The position also gave him an automatic place on the Metropolitan Toronto Council. He was re-elected in 1980, 1982 and 1985, and served as York's budget chief for this entire period.

Brown sought to replace Paul Godfrey as chair of Metro Council in 1984, but finished second against Dennis Flynn of Etobicoke. He campaigned for a position on the police board later in the year, but lost to Art Eggleton. Brown was named head of Metro's social service committee in 1985 and served as a member of the Toronto Transit Commission.

He was elected to succeed Alan Tonks as mayor of York in 1988, defeating former MPP Tony Grande by a significant margin. Brown highlighted his record of financial accountability and suggested that Grande did not have significant municipal experience to govern the city. He continued to serve on Metro Council, where he supported Tonks's successful challenge against Dennis Flynn for council chair.

In 1990, Brown endorsed a controversial plan to sell part of Fairbank Park to a company run by Toronto-area developer Lou Charles. The details of the sale provoked charges of political corruption, setting in motion a series of events that eventually led to the arrest and conviction of Charles and some of his political allies. Metro police investigated Brown's role in the sale but did not lay charges. In July 1991, Brown reversed his earlier position and helped council defeat the proposed sale. Several media reports from this period depicted him as unable to maintain order over an increasingly dysfunctional council.

Brown was re-elected to the mayor's office in 1991 over his old rival Philip White. He helped ensure passage of a compromise Market Value Assessment tax plan for Metro Toronto in 1992, although this plan was later overturned by the provincial government of Bob Rae.

Brown was defeated in 1994 by Frances Nunziata, who had spearheaded opposition to the Fairbank sale in 1990. The campaign centred on leadership issue: Brown pointed to his tenure in office, while Nunziata argued that he did not show decisive leadership during the controversy. The contest was marked by open animosity between the candidates, and Brown refused to travel to Nunziata's headquarters on election night to concede defeat.

Ideologically, Brown was described as a "moderate Tory", an "old-fashioned conservative", and a "very Red Tory". He endorsed David Miller in his campaigns for Mayor of Toronto.

== Later life ==
Brown served on the Board of Directors of The Learning Enrichment Foundation for 30 years, including as president. He died in Sunnybrook Hospital at the age of 89. He was buried at Park Lawn Cemetery in Toronto.
