= 1966 Toronto municipal election =

Election in Toronto, Canada

1966 Toronto mayoral election
| ← 1964 | December 5, 1966 | 1969 → |
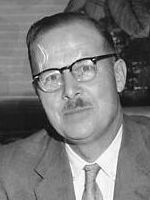

| Candidate | William Dennison | Philip Givens | William Archer |
| Popular vote | 59,363 | 54,525 | 40,946 |
| Percentage | 38.0% | 34.9% | 26.2% |
Mayor of Toronto before election
Philip Givens
Elected Mayor of Toronto
William Dennison

Municipal elections were held in Toronto, Ontario, Canada, on December 5, 1966. The elections were the first in Toronto after its merger with several smaller suburban communities on January 1, 1967. Forest Hill and Swansea were annexed by the City of Toronto, Leaside was merged with the Township of East York to become the Borough of East York. Weston was combined with the Township of York to form the Borough of York. The Village of Long Branch and the towns of Mimico and New Toronto were merged with the Township of Etobicoke to form the Borough of Etobicoke.

Rules were also changed to have municipal elections scheduled every three years, rather than every two as had been done previously.

== Toronto mayoral race ==
Incumbent mayor Philip Givens was challenged by two strong opponents. Givens was associated with the Liberal Party while Controller William Archer was a Progressive Conservative. The winner was William Dennison, a former Co-operative Commonwealth Federation Member of Provincial Parliament who was a longtime member of the New Democratic Party. Dennison, despite his labour roots was considered the most conservative of the three candidates. His slogan was "Respect for the Taxpayer's Dollar". Archer was the more centrist candidate, and had the endorsement of city councillors Charles Caccia, Kenneth Dear, and Hugh Bruce.

Central issues during the election was the extension of the Yonge subway line north of Eglinton and whether it should run on a cheaper above-ground route or be built underground so avoid demolishing homes. Perhaps the most important issue was Givens' advocacy for Henry Moore's controversial sculpture The Archer for Nathan Phillips Square also remained an issue. Originally the city had agreed to pay $100,000 for the modernist sculpture, but city council rejected the idea. Instead Givens succeeded in raising the $100,000 from private donors and had the sculpture placed in the square in front of city hall. Dennison strongly objected to having the piece of art in such a prominent venue.

In the final vote, the city was divided along ethnic and class lines. Givens dominated the downtown core winning the votes of the young and the cultured. He also won the heavily Jewish neighbourhood of Forest Hill. Archer carried the wealthy areas of Rosedale and North Toronto which had large populations of British descent. Dennison was victorious by winning the working class districts in both the east and west end of the city, including strong votes from Italian and Polish areas.

Results
William Dennison - 59,363
Philip Givens (incumbent) - 54,525
William Archer 40,946
John Sara - 1,239

== City council and Board of Control ==
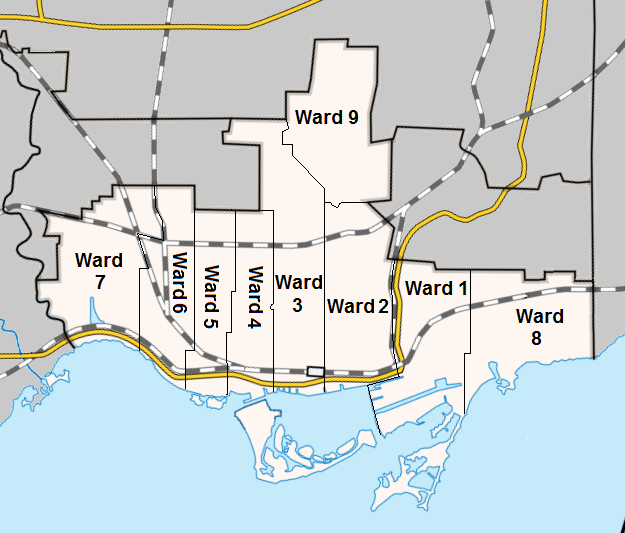
Ward boundaries used in the 1966 election

The 1966 election was the last in Toronto for the Board of Control. It consisted of four members elected at large from across the city who then formed the executive on city council. The Board candidate with the most votes became council president and budget chief. Two sitting controllers, Dennison and Archer, opted to run for mayor. This resulted in a competitive race of six major candidates for the four spots. Those in the running were three city councillors: June Marks, Joseph Piccininni, and Herbert Orliffe; sitting controller Margaret Campbell; former mayor Allan Lamport; and Liberal MPP George Ben.

=== Board of Control ===
The Toronto Board of Control was made up of the Mayor and four Controllers elected at large. The Mayor and the top two Controllers, in terms of votes received at the election, also sit on Metropolitan Toronto Council as well as Metro's Executive Committee.

Results
Margaret Campbell (incumbent) - 88,036
June Marks - 77,655
Herbert Orliffe (incumbent) - 76,412
Allan Lamport - 67,677
George Ben - 63,206
Joseph Piccininni - 58,122
Phyllis Clarke - 10,162
Arthur Young - 9,550
John Charles Ewing - 6,071
Dorothy Cureatz - 4,262
Shaba Musa - 2,399

=== Aldermen ===
Two aldermen were elected per Ward. The alderman with the most votes was declared Senior Alderman and sat on both Toronto City Council and Metro Council.

Ward 1 (Riverdale)
Fred Beavis (incumbent) - 10,038
Oscar Sigsworth (incumbent) - 7,129
Vern Burnett - 2,305
Edward Cox - 1,708

Ward 2 (East Downtown and Rosedale)
Michael Grayson (incumbent) - 6,426
Helen Johnston (incumbent) - 6,289
Harry Pope - 4,168
Donald Weir - 3,827
Keith Martin - 3,819
John Conforzi - 3,122
Gerald Quirke - 383

Ward 3 (West Downtown and Forest Hill)
David Rotenberg (incumbent) - 13,683
Charles Caccia (incumbent) - 11,720
Peter Stollery - 4,007
Isador Milton - 3,382
Sidney Banks - 3,154
James Sanderson - 1,064

Ward 4 (The Annex, Kensington Market and Garment District)
Horace Brown (incumbent) - 4,913
Monte Harris - 4,021
John Polowko - 1,601
Elizabeth Catty - 1,565
William Clarke - 1,472
Sam Komenar - 928

Ward 5 (Trinity-Bellwoods)
Tony O'Donohue - 5,920
Harold Menzies (incumbent) - 4,969
Elio Madonia - 3,675
Herry Wilk - 2,892
Pauline Miles - 1,361
Charles Weir - 931

Ward 6 (Davenport and Parkdale)
Hugh Bruce (incumbent) - 6,692
Kenneth Dear (incumbent) - 5,827
Archie Chishom - 4,993
Robert Grossi - 3,168
John O'Brien - 2,332
Anne Fritz - 1,046

Ward 7 (High Park and Swansea)
Mary Temple (incumbent) - 13,512
Ben Grys (incumbent) - 10,241
William Boytchuk - 5,876
John McRae - 1,891

Ward 8 (The Beaches)
Tom Wardle Sr. (incumbent) - 13,512
Alice Summerville (incumbent) - 12,212
Alex Hodgins - 7,370
Edward Gillen - 874
John Square - 613

Ward 9 (North Toronto)
Paul Pickett (incumbent) - 19,035
Richard Horkins - 16,241
Jules Pelletier - 6,513
Michael Comar - 1,771

Results are taken from the December 6, 1966 Toronto Star and might not exactly match final tallies.

== Changes ==
Controller Herbert Orliffe died on July 3, 1967. Ward 1 Alderman Fred Beavis was appointed Controller July 6; Oscar Sigsworth was appointed Metro councilor and Joseph Piccininni was appointed Alderman.

Ward 3 Alderman Charles Caccia resigned June 1969 having been elected in the 1968 Federal Election and was not replaced.

Ward 9 Alderman Richard Horkins resigned on November 1, 1969 upon appointment as a Toronto Hydro Commissioner and was not replaced.

== Metropolitan Toronto reorganization and mergers ==
From its inception in 1953 until the 1966 election, Metropolitan Toronto Council consisted of the Mayor of Toronto, two controllers (the top two of four in terms of votes) and one mayor or reeve from each suburban municipality in the federation: the towns of New Toronto, Mimico, Weston and Leaside; the villages of Long Branch, Swansea and Forest Hill and the townships of Etobicoke, York, North York, East York, and Scarborough, and presided over by the Metro Chairman who did not have a seat.

With the 1966 election, Long Branch, New Toronto, and Mimico were absorbed by Etobicoke; Weston was absorbed into York; Leaside into East York; and Swansea and Forest Hill, into Toronto. The reorganized Metropolitan Toronto was made up of six constituent municipalities: the City of Toronto and five boroughs: Etobicoke, Scarborough, North York, East York, and York.

Concurrently, representation on Metropolitan Toronto Council also changed and the body was expanded from 22 to 32 seats, with greater representation from the suburbs which now had 20 out of 32 seats on the body - up from 11 out of 22 with seats roughly allocated according to population. The distribution of seats was as follows. Toronto (12), North York (6), Scarborough (5), Etobicoke (4), York (3), East York (2). The new Metro Council was made up of the mayor of Toronto, two of the four members of the Toronto Board of Control, senior aldermen from the nine wards of the City of Toronto, the mayor of Scarborough and the four members of Scarborough's Board of Control, the mayor of Etobicoke and three of the four members of Etobicoke's Board of Control (the top three in terms of votes), the mayor of York and its two Controllers, the mayor of East York and one alderman, selected by East York council, the mayor of North York, all four members of North York's Board of Control, and one alderman selected by North York's council.

== Suburbs ==
=== East York ===
Mayor
(incumbent)True Davidson 12,312
Royden Brigham 8,112
Beth Nealson 7,957

Davidson defeated Brigham and Leaside Mayor Nealson who was running against Davison due to Leaside being amalgamrated into the new borough of East York, in what was billed by the media as the "Battle of the Belles". (source: Globe and Mail, page 8, 6 Dec 1966)

=== Etobicoke ===
Mayor
Edward Austin Horton 21,591
Murray Johnson 17,566
Thomas Berry 10,899

Board of Control (4 elected)
Donald Russell 26,540
David Lacey 24,458
(incumbent)John Carroll 24,138
W. Kenneth Robinson 21,367
George Bondy 20,528
Lloyd Shier 20,091
Hugh Griggs 18,366

(source: Globe and Mail, page 8, 6 Dec 1966)

=== North York ===
James Ditson Service, the last reeve of North York becomes its first mayor. Paul Godfrey and Robert Yuill were re-elected as ward alderman.

Mayor
(incumbent)James Ditson Service - 53,131 (82.8%)
Sam Wagman - 11,037 (17.2%)

Board of Control (4 elected)
(incumbent)G. Gordon Hurlburt - 42,060
(incumbent)Basil H. Hall - 38,670
(incumbent)Frank Watson - 35,826
Paul Hunt - 35,446
(incumbent)Irv Paisley - 35,080
Fishleigh - 14,024

=== Scarborough ===
Mayor
Albert Campbell 38,517 (76.2%)
Douglas Goddard 12,070 (23.8%)

Campbell, the outgoing reeve, is elected the first mayor of Scarborough.

Board of Control (4 elected)
Robert W. White 34,886
Gus Harris 28,543
Brian Harrison 28,143
Karl Mallette 25,051
Oliver E. Crockford 21,869
George Barker 18,835

Scarborough elected its inaugural Board of Control.

Reference: "For Ab Campbell, it was probably the last hurrah", Toronto Daily Star (page 13), December 6, 1966,

=== York ===
Mayor
(incumbent) Jack Mould 17,744
Albert Stollard 5,956
Charles J. McMaster 2,241

Board of Control (2 elected)
Philip White 13,749
C. Wesley Boddington 11,826
Florence Gell 7,544
Charles Goodfellow 7,324
John George Tames 2,694

This was York's inaugural Board of Control

(source: Globe and Mail, page 8, 6 Dec 1966)
