= Susan Eng =

Canadian lawyer (1953 –2025)

Susan Eng LLB
- Chinese: 伍素屏
- Born: 24 August 1952; Toronto
- Died: 26 July 2025 (aged 72); Toronto
- Education: Osgoode Hall Law School
- Occupation: Lawyer
- Years active: 1977–2025
- Known for: Social Activism
- Office: Chair, Metropolitan Toronto Police Services Board
- Term: 1991–1995
- Predecessor: June Rowlands
- Successor: Maureen Prinsloo

Susan Eng (Chinese: 伍素屏) (24 August 1952 – 26 July 2025) was a Canadian lawyer based in Toronto and chair of the Metropolitan Toronto Police Services Board from 1991 to 1995. She was also an activist in the Chinese community in Toronto.

== Early life and education ==
Eng was born in 1952 in Toronto, the daughter of immigrants from China. She received a Bachelor of Laws degree from Osgoode Hall Law School in 1975. She was called to Ontario Bar in 1977.

== Political career: 1984 ==
In 1984 Eng was a candidate in the Ward 6 by-election to fill John Sewell's vacated seat on Toronto City Council. She attracted support from the Progressive Conservative Party's Larry Grossman and Susan Fish and from Liberal Jim Coutts. Running as an independent, she was defeated by New Democratic Party candidate Dale Martin by a margin of 6,546 votes to 5,716. In the 1985 municipal election she supported Peter Maloney's unsuccessful candidacy in the same ward.

== Metropolitan Toronto Police Services Board ==
Eng was first appointed to the Metropolitan Toronto Police Services Board in 1989 by the Liberal government of David Peterson. Her swearing in ceremony on 18 May 1989 caused controversy as she omitted swearing an oath to be loyal to Queen Elizabeth II, instead being loyal to 'Canadians.'

=== Board chair ===
Eng's appointment to succeed June Rowlands as board chair was endorsed by the Toronto Star and Premier Bob Rae, as she supported Rae's police "reform" package, including mandatory reporting of each time an officer unholstered their gun. Eng's appointment was opposed by the Toronto Sun, many members of the police force, North York mayor Mel Lastman, and Scarborough mayor Joyce Trimmer. Trimmer tried to get the other Metro mayors to call upon premier Rae to extend then current chair Rowlands' term, instead of appointing Eng.

Despite early threats from Metro Toronto Council chair Alan Tonks, that Eng's appointment would not be rubber stamped at the 16 May 1991 board meeting, she easily won the vote that day and served as board chair from 1991 to 1995. She had a tense relationship with Metro police chief William J. McCormack.

One controversy that blew-up during this time was the police association's opposition to Premier Rae's mandatory reporting of weapon unholstering legislation. That opposition culminated in a job action initiated by association president Art Lymer on 5 October 1992. The job action morphed into the "Blue Ribbon Campaign" by December of that year. McCormack tried unsuccessfully to convince Lymer to drop the campaign and when he was unsuccessful, Eng wanted McCormack fired. The rank-and-file strongly supported McCormack in this dispute, and a group of officers who had set up a vigil for one of their own killed on duty booed Eng when she showed up.

=== Ben Eng dispute ===
Susan Eng also had a public disagreement with Metro police Sergeant Ben Eng (no relation to her), who was Metro Toronto's police officer of the year. Sergeant Eng went against Metro Toronto Police policy and compiled statistics on the criminal activities of recent refugees from Vietnam and mainland China. He stated that this relatively small group of people was involved in a disproportionately high number of crimes in Metro and reporting this to the Toronto Crime Inquiry in July 1991. Ms. Eng said that such reporting was biased and racist and publicly criticized the sergeant.

=== Police spying on Eng ===
According to an internal police report leaked in 2007, in 1991 during Eng's time as Police Board chair, then-detective Julian Fantino ordered a wiretap of Eng's friend Maloney. Conversations between Maloney and Eng were illegally recorded despite a court order that only the first minute of Maloney's conversations were to be monitored so as to determine whether the individual who he was talking to was on the list of those being investigated. According to former Police Chief McCormack, Peter Maloney had been instrumental in getting Eng appointed police services board chair, and many in the police resented Maloney for continually giving advice to Eng despite his lack of formal role.

== Post-police board career ==
Eng co-founded the Chinese Canadian National Council for Social Justice (CCNC-SJ) and organized a campaign for redress for the Chinese head tax that led to Prime Minister Stephen Harper formally apologizing for it in the House of Commons in 2006.

=== VP at CARP ===
Eng was vice-president of advocacy at the Canadian Association of Retired Persons (CARP), a non-profit group that lobbied governments regarding issues that were important to seniors and retirees. Eng was neutral about medically assisted dying (MAID), which became CARP president Moses Znaimer's main focus in the mid-2010s, when she alleges he fired her on 27 January 2016 and replaced her with Wanda Morris, the former head of Dying with Dignity Canada. That organization advocates for access to medically assisted dying and lobbied the federal government to bring down barriers to access MAID.

== Death ==
Eng died on 26 July 2025, at the age of 72. A memorial service was scheduled for September 2025, according to CityNews.

Preceded by June Rowlands; 1989–1991	Chair of the Metropolitan Toronto Police Services Board; 1991–1995	Succeeded by Maureen Prinsloo; 1995–1998
