= 1972 Toronto municipal election =

1972 Toronto mayoral election
- December 4, 1972
- Turnout: 40%
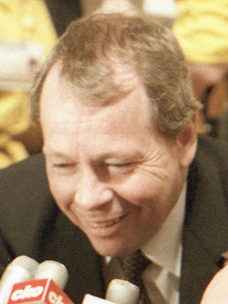

Candidate	David Crombie	Tony O'Donohue	David Rotenberg
Popular vote	82,754	58,362	35,213
Percentage	43%	30%	18%
Mayor of Toronto before election
William Dennison
Elected Mayor of Toronto
David Crombie

The 1972 Toronto municipal election was held December 4, 1972, to elect the governments of Toronto, Ontario, Canada, the five other boroughs, and the government of Metro Toronto as well.

The election was overshadowed by the 1972 federal election held October 30 and the American elections held November 7, but it resulted in a dramatic change in the city government. Four new mayors were elected, and 17 of 32 Metro seats were held by newcomers. In the City of Toronto, control of city council was won by the reform faction and reform leader David Crombie was elected mayor.

As in the 1969 election many of the central debates were over proposed megaprojects. The Spadina Expressway had been halted in 1971, but some wanted it built. The debate over the Scarborough Expressway was also one of the central issues in the east end.

An IBM 370-155 mainframe computer was used by the Toronto Star to process the results.

== Toronto ==
=== Mayoral election ===
Incumbent mayor William Dennison chose not to turn for reelection. The three main candidates vying to replace him were city councillors David Rotenberg, David Crombie, and Tony O'Donohue. O'Donohue and Rotenberg were veteran councillors. Rotenberg had been on council ten years and had served as Deputy Mayor. He also won the endorsement of the Toronto Star. Crombie had been elected to city council only three years earlier, previously serving as a professor at Ryerson Polytechnic Institute. He was a moderate member of the reform faction on council, willing to compromise with the Old Guard. A fourth notable candidate was Toronto Sun columnist Paul Rimstead, who ran a semi-serious campaign based on law and order policies.

Crombie dominated the affluent midtown and North Toronto wards, and also carried the east end of the city. O'Donohue won the heavily ethnic, working class wards of the west end.

Results
David Crombie - 82,754
Tony O'Donohue - 58,362
David Rotenberg - 35,213
Paul Rimstead - 7,934
Don Andrews - 1,960
Jacquie Henderson - 1,598
Nelson Clarke - 1,549

== City council ==
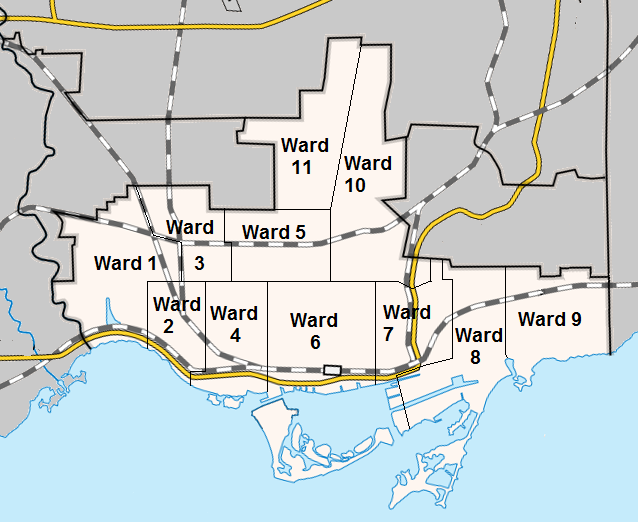
Ward boundaries used in the 1972 election

Two aldermen were elected per Ward. The alderman with the most votes was declared Senior Alderman and sat on both Toronto City Council and Metro Council.

The council elected in 1969 was split into two factions. The dominant group, commonly referred to as the 'Old Guard,' were 12 councillors who generally sided with developers and supported plans for urban renewal and new expressways. The opposition faction was made up of seven members who supported the reform movement. The reformers won a clear victory. Only four Old Guard aldermen were reelected: William Boytchuk, Joseph Piccininni, Fred Beavis, and Thomas Clifford. The reform faction won five new seats, giving them an overall majority on council.

Ward 1 (Swansea and Bloor West Village)
Elizabeth Eayrs (reform) - 10,312
William Boytchuk (incumbent) - 9,229
Ben Grys (incumbent) - 4,618
Carl Glutsczak - 3,416
Slough Bolton - 2,377
Ed Homonylo - 1,046
Yvette Tessier - 627
Andrejs Murniecks - 370

Ward 2 (Parkdale and Brockton)
Archie Chisholm (incumbent, reform) - 5,156
Ed Negridge - 3,222
Ken Dear - 2,938
Dave May - 2,316
Robert Grossi - 1,992
Anne Fritz - 1,693
Helen Johnson - 1,319
Michael Hookway - 1,202
Stanley Steban - 839
John Stifel - 602
Jack Prins - 203

Ward 3 (Davenport and Corso Italia)
Michael Goldrick (reform) - 4,967
Joseph Piccininni (incumbent) - 4,439
Hugh Bruce (incumbent) - 3,800
Joe Garisto - 2,213
Tim Burke - 978

Ward 4 (Trinity-Bellwoods and Little Italy)
Art Eggleton (incumbent) - 3,034
George Ben - 3,023
Margot Andras (reform) - 2,439
Frank Lacka - 1,587
Harold Menzies - 1,593
John Conforzi - 1,563
Mary Fraser - 1,054
Richard Follert - 319
Robert Fairley - 207
Darrell Furlotte - 163

Ward 5 (The Annex and Yorkville)
Ying Hope (incumbent, reform) - 12,872
Colin Vaughan (reform) - 11,585
Erna Kauffman - 2,685
David Astle - 1,469
David Boyd - 933
Manfred Schulzke - 698
Melania Gural - 561
Wilson Greig - 437

Ward 6 (Financial District, Toronto - University of Toronto)
William Archer (incumbent) - 7,395
Dan Heap (reform) - 7,153
June Marks (incumbent) - 6,396
Horace Brown (incumbent) - 2,928
Arthur Downes - 2,127

Ward 7 (Regent Park and Riverdale)
Karl Jaffary (incumbent, reform) - 10,572
John Sewell (incumbent, reform) - 9,952
Richard Kirkup - 4,969
Samuel Rotenberg - 3,212
Karl Van Harten - 448
Charles Rolfe - 422

Ward 8 (Riverdale)
Fred Beavis (incumbent) - 7,253
Thomas Clifford (incumbent) - 6,794
Dallard Runge (reform) - 5,724
Ellie Kirzner - 595
Christopher Greenland - 542

Ward 9 (The Beaches)
Reid Scott (reform, incumbent) - 10,432
Dorothy Thomas (reform) - 5,643
Joe McNulty - 4,479
Jim Purdie - 4,199
Tom Wardle Jr. - 4,004
John Oliver - 2,100
Don Ray - 797
George Leslie - 318
John Square - 115

Ward 10 (Rosedale and North Toronto)
William Kilbourn (incumbent, reform) - 20,099
Paul Pickett (incumbent) - 14,023
Juanne Hemsol (reform) - 9,578
Margaret Bryce - 2,641
Art Keay - 1,449

Ward 11 (Forest Hill and North Toronto)
Anne Johnston (reform) - 14,325
David Smith - 11,297
Larry Grossman - 9,127
Jim Mills - 8,035
William McKay - 1,399
Morris Kestin - 1,334
Alan Morrison - 1,329
Richard Sommers - 818
Sydney Zaidi - 605
Alan Manington - 551
John Houseman - 435
John Ross Taylor - 323

== East York ==
=== Mayor ===
- Willis Blair - 15,196 (57%)
- Royden Brigham - 11,458 (43%)

(Source: Toronto Star, pg 12, December 5, 1972)

== Etobicoke ==
=== Mayor ===
- Dennis Flynn - 28,126 (54.9%)
- David Lacey - 21,634 (42.2%)
- Reg Sammons - 1,484 (2.9%)

(582 out of 610 polls)

=== Etobicoke Board of Control (4 elected) ===
- Bill Stockwell - 29,259
- Bruce Sinclair - 27,762
- E. H. Farrow - 22,616
- (incumbent)John Allen - 21,312
- (incumbent)John Carroll - 19,868
- Hugh MacGregor Griggs 16,705
- MacDonald 15,015

(582 out of 610 polls)

(Source: "How the voting went throughout Etobicoke", Toronto Star, pg 13, December 5, 1972)

== North York ==
=== Mayor ===
- Mel Lastman - 48,328
- Paul Hunt - 36,380
- Andrew Fram - 2,536
- Rik Peletz - 1,264

(1033 out of 1075 polls)

Lastman is elected mayor for the first time and serves until 1997.

=== North York Board of Control (4 elected) ===
- Paul Godfrey - 60,421
- John Williams - 33,843
- Alex McGivern - 30,713
- Barbara Greene - 28,852
- Syd Moscoe - 23,129
- Joseph Gould - 20,075
- Ruby Richman - 17,861
- Joseph Morra - 14,596
- Sam Sherman - 10,784
- Malcolm Cairnduff - 6,291
- Ronald Premier - 4,329

Paul Godfrey was appointed to the Board of Control by North York Council in 1970, following the death of Controller John Booth. He was returned to the Board of Control in 1972, his first time being elected to the body. In 1973, he resigned to become Metro Chairman. Barbara Greene is elected in an upset victory after running to protest a by-law which made it illegal for unrelated roommates to share a house or apartment if the neighbourhood was zoned for single family dwellings. She is not only the first woman ever elected to North York's Board of Control but she and her roommate, Kate Hayhurst who ran for alderman and Betty Sutherland who was also elected as an alderman in 1972 are the first three women ever elected to North York council

== Scarborough ==
=== Mayor ===
- Paul Cosgrove - 33,488 (63.2%)
- (incumbent)Robert W. White - 14,086 (28.6%)
- Francis O'Donnell - 5,423 (10.2%)

(735 of 855 polls)

=== Board of Control (4 elected) ===
- (incumbent)Gus Harris 34,030
- (incumbent)Ken Morrish 31,949
- (incumbent)Brian Harrison 28,324
- (incumbent)Karl Mallette 24,053
- John Wimbs 20,222
- Tom Rowland 14,705
- John Nowotny 7,714
- William T. Phipps 6,594

(735 of 855 polls)

=== Borough Council ===
- Ward 7 Ed Fulton

== York ==
=== Mayor ===
- (incumbent)Phillip White (acclaimed)

(Source: Toronto Star, page 12, December 5, 1972)

=== Board of Control (2 elected) ===
- (incumbent)Douglas Saunders - 15,899
- (incumbent)James Trimbee - 14,054
- Rose Gallic - 5,163

(Source: Toronto Star, page 12, December 5, 1972; "The Star's suggestions for Monday's elections", Toronto Star, December 2, 1972, page 20)
