= 1969 Toronto municipal election =

1969 Toronto mayoral election
- December 1, 1969
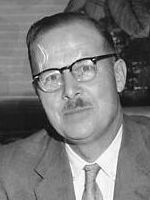

Candidate	William Dennison	Margaret Campbell	Stephen Clarkson
Party	N/A	N/A	Civic Liberal
Popular vote	65,988	52,742	31,889
Percentage	43.1%	34.5%	20.9%
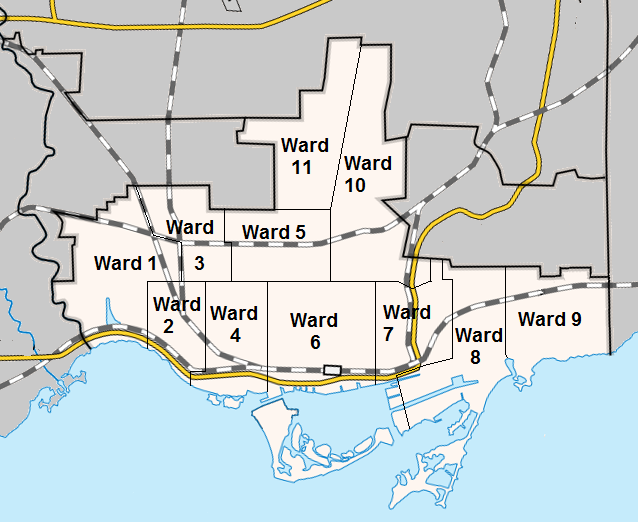
- Wards for the 1969 Toronto Municipal Election
Mayor of Toronto before election
William Dennison
Elected Mayor of Toronto
William Dennison

Municipal elections were held in Toronto, Ontario, Canada, on December 1, 1969. City of Toronto incumbent mayor William Dennison was easily re-elected.

Across Metro Toronto few of the results were surprises. A dramatic exception to this was in the Toronto city council aldermanic contest. A number of long-standing members lost to young new arrivals who stated their opposition to megaprojects that had transformed Toronto during the post-war period.

The reform movement candidate for mayor was unsuccessful, but the movement gained a strong presence on city council. The 1970s reform faction dominated Toronto politics for the next decade.

== Toronto mayoral race ==
The NDP chose not to enter an official mayoral candidate but tacitly endorsed incumbent William Dennison, who ran as an independent but had been active in the New Democratic Party, and its predecessor the Co-operative Commonwealth Federation, for many decades previously.

The Liberals nominated University of Toronto professor Stephen Clarkson as their candidate.

The third candidate was city controller Margaret Campbell. A Progressive Conservative, she ran on an explicitly reform platform.

An important issue in the race was the future of Metro Toronto, with Dennison pushing strongly for amalgamation of Metro into a single city. The Progressive Conservative provincial government opposed this initiative. During the election a non-binding referendum was held in the city, and most voters voted in favor of amalgamation. The candidates also debated whether Metro should grow to incorporate the newly formed suburbs to the north in Markham and Thornhill.

Candidates held diverse opinions about the continuation of the urban renewal plans that had reshaped to Toronto in the 1950s and 1960s. Campbell staunchly opposed the Spadina Expressway and the further demolition of neighbourhoods to build apartment towers. Clarkson also opposed the expressway but argued the city was giving up federal funding by abandoning the clearances program and that areas like Kensington Market and Trefann Court should be redeveloped.

Results of the December 1, 1969 Toronto Mayoral Election
Candidate	Affiliation	Popular vote		Elected?
Candidate	Affiliation	Votes	%	Elected?
William Dennison (Incumbent)	Independent	65,988	43.1%	
Margaret Campbell	Independent	52,742	34.5%	
Stephen Clarkson	Civic Liberal	31,889	20.9%	
John Riddell	League for Socialist Action	2,363	1.5%	
Total votes		138,549		

== Toronto city council ==
With this election, the manner in which Toronto was governed was changed in three important ways.

The Board of Control was abolished, replaced by an executive committee of city council and ward boundaries were redrawn to increase the number of wards from nine to 11. Each ward continued to elect two aldermen using plurality block voting. The most popular candidate from each ward also won a seat on Metro Toronto council.

Political parties were introduced into municipal politics, with both the Liberals and New Democrats running slates. The Progressive Conservatives chose not to run as an organized slate, despite its supporters having a majority of seats on the council prior to the election. The locally based Civic Action Party (CIVAC) also organized for the election. Founded by Ryerson professor David Crombie, it was a loose coalition of moderate reform-minded candidates. The Trotskyist League for Socialist Action also ran candidates as a party.

The ward map was redrawn with two new wards and the replacement of strip wards which had extended from the northern limits of the city to the lake with block wards with Bloor Street as a border. Under the previous boundaries wealthier neighbourhoods that tended to be north of Bloor were in the same wards as poorer neighbourhoods south of Bloor. This usually resulted in aldermen being elected from richer neighbourhoods with higher turnout. As a result of the new boundaries, more affluent neighbourhoods north of Bloor were separated from what were normally poorer neighbourhoods south of Bloor and as a result, the new wards south of Bloor were more likely to elect alderman who represented the interests of poorer working class residents. The change occurred as a result of demands by social activists who went to the Ontario Municipal Board demanding a "block ward" system.

As a result, the 1969 election saw several "reform" aldermen elected, including John Sewell and Karl Jaffary in the new Ward 7, which had been carved out of the old Ward 2. Mayor Dennison commented that "They never would have been elected in Ward 2".

In the Toronto election, 22 aldermen were elected from 11 wards, with the two highest vote-getters in each ward being elected. The top vote-getter in each ward also won a seat on Metro Toronto Council.

The election was a disaster for the Liberals: Clarkson finished a distant third, and only two members were elected to city council. Most successful of the parties was CIVAC, which won five seats. Three New Democrats were elected, and the rest of the winning candidates had run as independents.

The most striking change was the defeat of six incumbent, Tory, pro-development councillors by reform candidates. Michael Grayson, Oscar Sigsworth, Harold Menzies, Helen Johnston, Ken Dear, and Alice Summerville were defeated. Four other aldermen had retired prior to the election, and the new council contained ten new members. New arrivals included David Crombie, John Sewell, and Art Eggleton.

A loose coalition was formed that controlled 11 of the 22 council seats, but there were sharp divisions between the left members such as Sewell and Jaffary and more right-wing members such as Hope and O'Donahue. The coalition soon broke down. O'Donohue, Rotenberg, Eggleton sided more often with the Old Guard pro-development faction, leaving only seven members (a minority on council) who consistently opposed urban renewal plans.

Ward 1 (Swansea and Bloor West Village)
Ben Grys (incumbent)- 9,031
William Boytchuk - 4,544
Frank Paznar - 3,895
William Zock (NDP) - 2,861
Reta Hirons (NDP) - 2,069
Robert Karfell (Liberal) - 1,245
Harry Bradley - 800

Ward 2 (Parkdale and Brockton)
Allan Lamport (incumbent) - 5,817
Archie Chisholm (NDP) - 4,412
Kenneth Dear (incumbent) - 3,526
Michael Comar (Liberal)- 1,670
Robert Grossi - 1,345
Nino De Costa (Liberal)- 1,116
Michael Kaschuck - 677
Harry Stone (League for Socialist Action)- 405

Ward 3 (Davenport and Corso Italia)
Hugh Bruce (Liberal, incumbent) - 5,131
Joseph Piccininni (incumbent) - 4,340
Fortunato Rao (NDP) - 1,563
Marc Llanos (NDP) - 1,007
Pamela Ward - 559
Alice Maigis - 516

Ward 4 (Trinity-Bellwoods and Little Italy)
Tony O'Donohue (incumbent, CIVAC) - 4,962
Art Eggleton (CIVAC) - 2,668
Johnny Lombardi - 2,473
Vernon Kimball (NDP) - 1,083
Frank Lacka - 1,044
Jack Matraia - 609
Norman Brudy - 392
Harold Peerenboom (Liberal) - 332

Ward 5 (The Annex and Yorkville)
Ying Hope (CIVAC) - 6,016
William Archer - 5,370
Harold Menzies (incumbent) - 3,916
Hugh Marchand (NDP) - 3,058
Kenneth Counsell (Liberal) - 2,679
Frank Ricciuti (Liberal) - 2,300
Ted Culp (NDP) - 768
David Astle - 574
Joan Newbigging (League for Socialist Action) - 330

Ward 6 (Financial District, Toronto - University of Toronto)
June Marks (incumbent) - 4,738
Horace Brown (incumbent) - 2,810
Peter Stollery (Liberal) - 2,768
Michael Grayson (incumbent) - 2,755
John Conforzi (CIVAC) - 2,314
Helen Roedde (NDP) - 2,052
Donald Flowers (Liberal) - 977
Charles Downes - 624
Dorothy Cureatz - 301
James Sanderson - 180

Ward 7 (Regent Park and Riverdale)
Karl Jaffary (NDP) - 5,433
John Sewell - 5,054
Oscar Sigsworth (incumbent) - 3,093
Michael Doran - 2,554
Sam Rotenburg - 2,515
Douglas Loney (Liberal) - 1,379
Richard Fidler (League for Socialist Action) - 418
Charles Rolfe - 324
Steve Necheff - 270

Ward 8 (Riverdale)
Fred Beavis (incumbent) - 7,154
Tom Clifford - 4,158
Tony Barclay (NDP) - 3,090
Betty Knight - 2,763
Steve Arvanitis (NDP) - 2,681
Tony Calderaro (Liberal) - 990
Kenneth Swire - 331

Ward 9 (The Beaches)
Tom Wardle Sr. (incumbent) - 9,178
Reid Scott (NDP) - 8,965
Alice Summerville (incumbent) - 5,697
Gerry Thompson (NDP) - 3,528
Robert Fullerton - 1,733
Don Grills (Liberal) - 1,116

Ward 10 (Rosedale and North Toronto)
Paul Pickett (incumbent) - 13,700
William Kilbourn (Liberal) - 8,221
Helen Johnston (incumbent) - 5,371
Ann Tomlinson (Liberal) - 3,508
Juanna Hemsol (CIVAC) - 2,353
Eleanor O'Connor (NDP) - 1,849
Michael Harper - 962

Ward 11 (Forest Hill and North Toronto)
David Rotenberg (incumbent, CIVAC) - 15, 389
David Crombie (CIVAC) - 14,036
Samuel Kellner (Liberal) - 7,512
Bernard Eastman (NDP) - 1,773
Robert MacGilchrist - 1,466
Pauline Shapero - 673

Results are taken from the December 2, 1969 Toronto Star and might not exactly match final tallies.

== Vacancy ==
Ward 9 Alderman Tom Wardle Sr., elected in the 1971 provincial election and resigned from City Council on September 12, 1972 when the provincial government passed legislation to prohibit MPPs from holding municipal office. His resignation was accepted on September 13 and the remaining Ward 9 Alderman Reid Scott was appointed Metro Councillor. .

== Suburbs ==
There were few surprises in the elections outside the city of Toronto. Incumbent mayors True Davidson, Robert W. White, Edward A. Horton respectively in East York, Scarborough, and Etobicoke were reelected. Philip White won the vacant mayoralty in York and Basil H. Hall won the open seat in North York, defeating Ron Barbaro who was the nominee of the Liberal Party as part of its attempt to enter municipal politics. There were few upsets on the councils. One notable new arrival on North York council (Board of Control) was Bad Boy furniture owner Mel Lastman. Paul Godfrey was re-elected as an alderman by acclamation and Dennis Timbrell is elected alderman at the age of 23, Robert Yuill was re-elected as ward alderman.

=== East York ===
Mayor
(incumbent)True Davidson 16,236 (62.6%)
Royden Brigham 9,709 (37.4%)

(source: Toronto Daily Star, page 13, December 2, 1969)

=== Etobicoke ===
Mayor
(incumbent)Edward Austin Horton 25,016 (51.70%)
Dennis Flynn 23,367 (48.29%)

Flynn, a City of Toronto information officer, came close to unseating Horton despite only beginning his campaign two days before election day. He would go on to be a long-time Mayor of Etobicoke and later Metro Chairman.

(source: Toronto Daily Star, page 12, December 2, 1969)

Board of Control (4 elected)
(incumbent)Donald Russell 30,852
(incumbent)David Lacey 28,340
(incumbent)John Carroll 25,660
John Allen 23,717
E. H. Farrow 21,203
Thomas Berry 17,893

(source: Toronto Daily Star, page 12, December 2, 1969)

Council

Sportswriter Dick Beddoes was elected alderman for Ward 2.

(source: Toronto Daily Star, page 12, December 2, 1969)

=== North York ===
Mayor
Basil H. Hall - 55,654 (67.26%)
Ron Barbaro - 20,019 (24.19%)
Sam Sherman - 7,060 (8.53%)

Board of Control (4 elected)
Irv Paisley - 41,328
(incumbent)Paul Hunt - 41,212
Mel Lastman - 35,580
John Booth - 34,077
Donald Brill - 28,111
Alex McGivern - 27,944
Donald Aldcorn - 22,111
Sam Wagman - 12,468
Jerry Ewins - 9,267

=== Scarborough ===
Mayor
Robert W. White - 44,307 (80.31%)
Albert G. Early - 10,879 (19.69%)

Board of Control
{x)Gus Harris - 34,456
Ken Morrish - 33,890
(incumbent)Brian Harrison - 30,050
(incumbent)Karl Mallette - 28,671
Frank Faubert - 23,506
George Peck - 22,685

=== York ===
Mayor
Philip White 13,749
C. Wesley Boddington 11,826

Controller Phillip White defeated fellow Controller and former Weston mayor Boddington.

Board of Control (2 elected)
James Trimbee 12,561
Douglas Saunders 11,920
Denis Shute 7,888
Chris Tonks 6,959

(source: Toronto Daily Star, page 13, December 2, 1969)
