= Maureen Prinsloo =

South African politician (1938–2017)

Alderwoman, Ward 10, Scarborough
- In office 1978–1988

Personal details
- Born: Maureen Berg; 1938 Union of South Africa
- Died: December 2, 2017 (aged 79) Toronto, Ontario
- Occupation: Civil servant

Maureen Prinsloo (1938 – December 2, 2017) was a municipal politician in Scarborough, Ontario who served as Chair of the Toronto Police Services Board from 1995 to 1998.

== Life ==
Prinsloo was born in South Africa and moved to Canada with her husband in 1965.

She was elected to Scarborough municipal council in 1978 and served for 10 years as an alderman. In 1985, she was one of the alderman chosen by Scarborough Council to sit on Metro Council and in 1988, she won a seat in her own right on Metro Toronto Council from the ward of Scarborough Wexford. While on Metro Council she served as Deputy Chair under Alan Tonks and also served as chair of the Board of Governors of Exhibition Place. She ran for Mayor of Scarborough in 1994 coming in third place behind Frank Faubert and Marilyn Mushinski.

In 1995, she was chosen by the Ontario NDP government of Bob Rae as one of the province's appointees to the Metropolitan Toronto Police Services Board with the intention of having her succeed Susan Eng as chair. She was elected chair by a 5-2 margin.

Prinsloo's term as chair saw improved relations between the Board and the Metropolitan Toronto Police compared to the tempestuous relationship that existed under Prinsloo's predecessor, Susan Eng.

Following the 1997 municipal election that saw City Council move to the right under new Mayor of Toronto Mel Lastman as well as the more conservative tenor of the province's appointees to the Board under Conservative Premier Mike Harris, Prinsloo was challenged for the position of board chair by conservative Councillor Norman Gardner, despite the long-standing convention that an incumbent chair is not challenged for the position and that the chair of the board not be a sitting city councillor. With Lastman's backing, Gardner, won the position by a 4-3 margin.

Prinsloo remained on the Board as an ordinary member until May when she resigned from the board before the end of her term.

== Death ==
Prinsloo died on December 2, 2017, aged 79, at a Toronto palliative care facility after being diagnosed with brain cancer.

== Electoral history ==
Mayor of Scarborough (1994)

- Frank Faubert 54,885
- Marilyn Mushinski 24,041
- Maureen Prinsloo 17,376
- John O'Malley 5,088
- Max French 2,792
- Abel Van Wyk 2,758

Metro Council: Scarbourgh Wexford (1991)

- Maureen Prinsloo 6,288
- Hugh Canning - 4,820

Metro Council: Scarborough Wexford (1988)

- Maureen Prinsloo 6,007
- Bryan Prettie 4,922

Scarborough City Council: Ward 10 (1985)

- Maureen Prinsloo 4,045
- Richard Edmonds 1,997

Scarborough Council: Ward 10 (1982)

- Maureen Prinsloo (acclaimed)

Scarborough Council: Ward 10 (1980)

- Maureen Prinsloo
- Patrick J. Doyle

Scarborough Council: Ward 10 (1978) (104 out of 105 polls counted)

- Prinsloo 2,892
- Murphy 1,835
- MacPherson 1,395
- Boye 748
- Calcutt 616
- Wayne 380

Preceded by Susan Eng; 1991–1995	Chair of the Metropolitan Toronto Police Services Board; 1995–1998	Succeeded by Norman Gardner; 1998–2004
