= John Sewell =

Canadian politician; mayor of Toronto

John Sewell CM
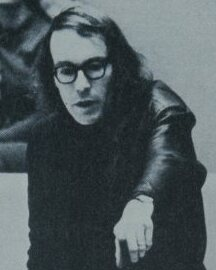

58th Mayor of Toronto
- In office December 1, 1978 – November 30, 1980
- Preceded by: Fred Beavis
- Succeeded by: Art Eggleton

Toronto City Councillor for Ward 7
- In office 1969 – November 30, 1978 Serving with Karl Jaffary (1969-1974); Janet Howard (1974-1978)
- Preceded by: new ward boundaries
- Succeeded by: Gordon Cressy

Metro Toronto Councillor for Ward 7
- In office 1974 – November 30, 1978
- Preceded by: Karl Jaffary
- Succeeded by: Gordon Cressy

Personal details
- Born: December 8, 1940 (age 85) Toronto, Ontario, Canada
- Spouse: Liz Rykert
- Education: University of Toronto
- Occupation: Politician; lawyer; activist; writer

John Sewell CM (born December 8, 1940) is a Canadian politician and lawyer who served as the 58th mayor of Toronto from 1978 to 1980.

== Background ==
Born and raised in the Beach neighbourhood, in Toronto, Sewell attended Malvern Collegiate Institute and the University of Toronto, graduating with an English Literature degree in 1961. He earned a law degree from the University of Toronto Law School in 1964 and was called to the bar in 1966.

== Early political career ==
Sewell became active in city politics in 1966 when he joined the residents of the Trefann Court Urban Renewal Area in the fight against the expropriation and levelling of the working-class and poor neighbourhood. Sewell was also involved in opposing the building of the Spadina Expressway in the late 1960s and early 1970s. He was first elected to Toronto City Council in 1969 as alderman for Ward 7, a predominantly working-class area including St. Jamestown, Regent Park, Don Vale, and Cabbagetown. He also initiated the founding of a community-owned newspaper, Seven News, seen as an alternative to Toronto's corporate-owned daily papers.

Sewell became the leader of city council's reform wing, and was elected Mayor of Toronto in 1978.

== Mayor of Toronto ==
=== Election ===
In the 1978 election, the right-wing vote was split between two mayoral candidates, David Paul Smith and Tony O'Donohue. Sewell won the election with less than 50 percent of the vote: Sewell won 71,305 votes, to O'Donohue's 62,173 and Smith's 45,071.

=== Tenure ===
Sewell was portrayed as a radical in the media, and was dubbed "Mayor Blue Jeans" by the Toronto Sun because denim, which Sewell wore to city council meetings as an alderman, was still considered an identifier of the counterculture. As an environmentalist famous for riding his bicycle to council, he opposed the development of banking and convention centres in the central business district that would become the hallmark of the mayors who followed. Sewell also established himself as a leading critic of the Toronto Police by demanding greater accountability to the public. He was a leading defender of gay rights and endorsed the activist George Hislop's 1980 candidacy for city council while it was rare for public figures to express support for gay rights.

In the 1980 election, after two years of controversy, pro-development Conservatives and Liberals encouraged and united behind the candidacy of Art Eggleton who was presented as the establishment candidate. Although Sewell maintained the support of many Red Tories, reform Liberals, and New Democrats and won more votes and a larger share of the vote than in 1978, he lost the mayor's office to Eggleton.

== Later life ==
Sewell subsequently returned to city council as an alderman in a by-election, to replace Ward 6 alderman Dan Heap who had been elected to parliament, and won re-election in 1982. He retired from municipal politics in 1984 to accept a job as a columnist at The Globe and Mail. He subsequently moved to Now Magazine and then wrote a regular column in Toronto's eye weekly from 1999 to 2005. He has written a number of books and articles on Toronto urban issues.

Sewell served as chair of the Toronto public housing authority from 1986 to 1988 and is an acknowledged urban affairs expert. He has served as chair of the Royal Commission on Planning and Development Reform in Ontario from 1991 to 1993. Sewell was an advisor to the city council of East London, South Africa from 1994 to 1999 and as advisor on the re-establishment of local government in Malawi in 2000. Sewell also taught law, politics, and social science at York University from 1989 to 1991.

In the late 1990s, Sewell founded the group Citizens for Local Democracy to fight the plans of the provincial Mike Harris government to abolish Metropolitan Toronto and amalgamate its constituent parts into a new City of Toronto "megacity."

In the 1999 Ontario provincial election, Sewell ran as an independent candidate in the riding of Toronto Centre—Rosedale, challenging Progressive Conservative cabinet minister Al Leach to protest the megacity. His entry into the race was controversial, with many activists accusing him of splitting the left-wing vote with the New Democratic Party (NDP). Sewell was also criticized for remaining in the race after Leach, whom he had personally targeted as the minister responsible for amalgamation, had withdrawn from the contest. The riding was ultimately won by the Liberal George Smitherman. Sewell finished third, behind the Conservative Durhane Wong-Rieger.

In 2005, Sewell was made a member of the Order of Canada.

On June 26, 2006, Sewell announced that he would seek election in Ward 21 and run against Joe Mihevc in Toronto's 2006 municipal election. Sewell said that he was motivated to run because of the construction of a streetcar right-of-way along St. Clair Avenue, which was supported by Mihevc. He also stated that he was disappointed at the record of Mayor David Miller. Sewell said, "Living in a megacity demands more citizen participation and community consultation, not less." His candidacy received much publicity in the local media, but he was defeated by Mihevc, who received 8096 votes, compared to Sewell's 3326.

Sewell, a former resident of Riverdale, resides in Ward 21 and has his law office on Beverley Street. He is active in the Toronto Police Accountability Coalition. In November 2008, Sewell was diagnosed with non-Hodgkin lymphoma. He received chemotherapy, and as of November 2009, the cancer is in remission.

== Election results ==
2006 Toronto election, Ward 21
| Candidate | Votes | % |
| Joe Mihevc | 8,096 | 56.7 |
| John Sewell | 3,326 | 23.3 |
| John Adams | 2,713 | 19.0 |
| Tony Corpuz | 150 | 1.1 |

1999 Ontario general election
| Party | Candidate | Votes | % |
|---|---|---|---|
| Liberal | George Smitherman | 17756 | 38.9 |
| Progressive Conservative | Durhane Wong-Rieger | 13640 | 29.88 |
| Independent | John Sewell | 8822 | 19.33 |
| New Democratic | Helen Breslauer | 4019 | 8.8 |
| Green | Joseph Cohen | 392 | 0.86 |
| Freedom | Paul McKeever | 344 | 0.75 |
| Independent | Mike Ryner | 236 | 0.52 |
| Family Coalition | Bill Whatcott | 232 | 0.51 |
| Natural Law | Ron Parker | 205 | 0.45 |

1982 Toronto election, Ward 6 (Two elected)
| Candidate | Votes | % |
| John Sewell | 13,419 | |
| Jack Layton | 9,892 | |
| Gordon Chong | 8,213 | |
| Oscar Wong | 2,479 | |
| Bill Beatty | 1,563 | |
| Martin Amber | 546 | |

1980 Toronto election, Mayoral
| Candidate | Votes | % |
| Art Eggleton | 87,919 | |
| John Sewell | 86,152 | |
| Anne McBride | 3,429 | |
| Bob Bush | 2,479 | |
| Fred Dunn | 1,100 | |
| Armand Siksna | 867 | |
| Ronald Rodgers | 846 | |
| Chris Faiers | 590 | |
| Andrejs Murnieks | 571 | |

1978 Toronto election, Mayoral
| Candidate | Votes | % |
| John Sewell | 71,885 | |
| Tony O'Donohue | 62,173 | |
| David Smith | 45,071 | |
| Joe Martin | 1,658 | |
| Ron Morawski | 1,546 | |
| John Beattle | 1,239 | |
| Louis Thomas | 826 | |
| Richard Sanders | 778 | |
| Zoltan Szoboszloi | 439 | |
| Hardial Dhir | 379 | |
| Walter Lohaza | 336 | |
| Andries Murnieks | 323 | |

1976 Toronto municipal election - Ward 7 (Regent Park and Riverdale)

John Sewell (incumbent) - 8,786
Janet Howard (incumbent) - 6,460
Gary Stamm - 4,419
Ronald Taylor - 770
Charles Rolfe - 767

1974 Toronto municipal election - Ward 7 (Regent Park and Riverdale)

John Sewell (incumbent) - 6,233
Janet Howard - 4,248
Gary Stamm - 3,813
Andy Marinakis - 603
Peggy Reinhardt - 454
John Bizzell - 289
Stanley Carrier - 388
Kate Alderdice - 329
Steve Necheff - 257
Sandra Fox - 248
Armand Siksna - 212

1972 Toronto municipal election - Ward 7 (Regent Park and Riverdale)

Karl Jaffary (incumbent, reform) - 10,572
John Sewell (incumbent, reform) - 9,952
Richard Kirkup - 4,969
Samuel Rotenberg - 3,212
Karl Van Harten - 448
Charles Rolfe - 422

1969 Toronto municipal election - Ward 7 (Regent Park and Riverdale)

Karl Jaffary (NDP) - 5,433
John Sewell - 5,054
Oscar Sigsworth (incumbent) - 3,093
Michael Doran - 2,554
Sam Rotenburg - 2,515
Douglas Loney (Liberal) - 1,379
Richard Fidler (League for Socialist Action) - 418
Charles Rolfe - 324
Steve Necheff - 270

== Works ==
- Inside City Hall: The year of the opposition (1971) A.M. Hakkert. ISBN 0-88866-507-5
- Up Against City Hall (1972) James Lorimer and Company. ISBN 0-88862-021-7
- Rowland Travel Guide to Toronto (with Charlotte Sykes) (1985) Rowland & Jacob. ISBN 0-921430-00-0
- Police: Urban Policing in Canada (1986) James Lorimer and Company. ISBN 0-88862-744-0
- The shape of the city: Toronto struggles with modern planning (1993) University of Toronto Press. ISBN 0-8020-7409-X
- Houses and Homes: Housing for Canadians (1994) James Lorimer and Company. ISBN 1-55028-437-1
- Redeveloping public housing projects (1999) Caledon Institute of Social Policy. ISBN 1-894159-67-5
- Doors Open Toronto, Illuminating the City's Great Spaces (2002) Random House. ISBN 0-676-97498-8
- Mackenzie, a political biography of William Lyon Mackenzie (2002) James Lorimer and Company. ISBN 1-55028-767-2
- A New City Agenda (2004) Zephyr Press. ISBN 0-9734112-2-8
- The Shape of the Suburbs: Understanding Toronto's Sprawl (2009) University of Toronto Press. ISBN 0-8020-9587-9
- How We Changed Toronto (2015) Lorimer. ISBN 978-1459409408
