= Oliver E. Crockford =

Former reeve of Scarborough, Ontario, Canada (1893–1986)

30th Reeve of Scarborough, Ontario
- In office 1948–1955
- Preceded by: R.H. Palmer
- Succeeded by: Gus Harris

Personal details
- Born: Oliver E. Crockford; 1893 Parry Sound, Ontario
- Died: March 28, 1986 (aged 92) Scarborough, Ontario, Canada

Oliver E. Crockford (1893 – 28 March 1986) was the reeve of Scarborough, Ontario, Canada, from 1948 until 1956, and gained the nickname "Mr. Scarborough" during his tenure. He is credited with the industrial development of Scarborough, transforming the rural township into a modern suburb of Toronto by spearheading the creation and development of the "Golden Mile of Industry" (Golden Mile, Toronto) – Canada's first industrial park, resulting in both industrial and residential development of the strip and the surrounding area, and the population of Scarborough doubling in six years.

== Early life ==
Crockford was born in Parry Sound, Ontario, and worked as a railway agent for the Canadian National Railway before going to McMaster University to study English and theology, becoming a Baptist minister in 1921. He moved to the Highland Creek area of Scarborough in 1934 and was first elected to town council in 1945, becoming deputy reeve the next year and reeve in 1948. He also sat on Metro Council from 1953 to 1954 and was a member of its executive committee.

== Reeve of Scarborough ==
After his election as reeve in 1948, which was equivalent to the position of mayor in other municipalities, he convinced Scarborough Town Council to purchase land along Eglinton Avenue East from the federal government, which had been used during the Second World War for munitions production by the government-owned General Engineering Company. The parcel of land consisted of 125 buildings on 225 acres. Worth an estimated $7 million, Crockford convinced the federal government to sell the land to Scarborough for $350,000. Scarborough repurposed some buildings for municipal offices while selling other properties to manufacturers such as Frigidaire, Inglis, SKF, General Motors, Thermos and others for use as factories. The manufacturing boom also resulted in a residential boom with 100,000 houses being built in Scarborough in 1953 alone. Under Crockford's leadership, Scarborough went from the edge of bankruptcy with municipal assessment revenues earning only $11 million in 1946 to more than $220 million in 1954. Crockford allowed for Scarborough to have the highest density of single-family units per acre in the Toronto area, attracting working-class people looking to own a home.

As reeve, Crockford also convinced a Roman Catholic nursing order that was closing its operations in Toronto to relocate to Scarborough, and to establish the municipality's first hospital, Scarborough General Hospital.

Crockford was defeated in 1955 by Gus Harris after being accused of corruption for accepting a free Cadillac from a property developer. He twice ran for the Ontario Liberal Party for election to the Ontario legislature from York—Scarborough (provincial electoral district), in 1955 and 1959, but was defeated both times.
