= Learning Enrichment Foundation =

The Learning Enrichment Foundation
- Founded: 1978
- Type: Educational Charity
- Purpose: immigrant settlement, language training, employment services, child care
- Location: 116 Industry St., Toronto, Ontario, Canada
- Origins: Old City of York, Ontario
- Region served: Toronto
- Key people: Executive Director: Peter Frampton
- Employees: 279
- Website: www.lefca.org

The Learning Enrichment Foundation (LEF) is a Toronto-based organization that provides multiple services with a focus on skills training and economic development. The foundation provides immigrant settlement, supports language training, career exploration, job search support, youth programs, and mentorship along with a variety of other skills training. The foundation is an advocate of integrated employment programs and accessible child care.

== History ==
A mural at the Learning Enrichment Foundation

In the late 1970s, The Borough of York (now a municipality of Toronto) was going through a major economic downturn with closed factories, high unemployment, and vacancies. This caused a decline in both incomes and tax revenue, deflating rent prices. As a result, the region became attractive to a wave of recent immigrants. However, without the tax revenue, the Borough was unable to provide adequate social, education, and employment services.

In response to these circumstances, a group of community stakeholders formed a charitable organization which incorporated itself as the Learning Enrichment Foundation in 1978. LEF started by providing multicultural theatre for children but quickly diversified into skill training and youth counseling.

Over the years, LEF has continued to initiate programs and services that reflect the needs of the local community. As a reception area for recent immigrants and as part of the Greater Toronto Area with the highest levels of poverty indicators, there was much to be accomplished. LEF now is a leader in community economic development, particularly as it relates to human capital, and still serves the local community. However, poverty and unemployment are not unique to the former City of York, and LEF continues to attract people from across the GTA.

In the early 1980s, LEF opened child care centers and launched employment services and skills training programs. Programs and services include skill training in areas where there are local jobs, job search, counselling, recruitment service for employers, self-employment training and support, training enterprises including LEF Wood Works and Cooks Training for at-risk youth, technology help desk, computer access sites, Language Instruction for Newcomers to Canada (LINC) classes and literacy classes, a training loan fund, several social enterprises, 18 child care centers and 16 Before & After School Programs and a kitchen in which LEF prepares 500 meals a day through a partnership with Second Harvest. These meals go to agencies that serve the homeless. LEF provides a hearty soup lunch to all clients in the building every Thursday and to LINC nursery children (30 to 35) every day.

By 1991, LEF outgrew its facility and moved into its current location on Industry Street. LEF has developed many cooperative relationships with many different government departments as well as local organizations and networks in order to plan, improve, and develop innovative solutions to local needs. These include social service (e.g. North York Harvest Food Bank), immigrant service (e.g. OCASI), child care (e.g. York Early Years), disadvantaged youth (e.g. The Court's Diversionary Program), and ex-convicts (Pardons Canada).

In relation to local employment, the cooperative relationships include specific skill training and recruitment for local employers, sharing job leads with 300 community partners weekly, active networking with many other organizations, umbrella groups, and individuals, through referrals, collaboration, and regular meetings. LEF is a founding member of The Canadian Community Economic Development Network and is active on membership and Human Capital Development Committees and on the Policy Council. LEF is also a founding member of the Ontario and the Canadian CAP Networks.

== Programs ==
=== Bicycle assembly and maintenance program ===
To address Toronto's growth of cycling and the consequent need for skilled bicycle mechanics, the Learning Enrichment Foundation partnered with the Bicycle Trade Association of Canada to create a training program. Launched in the winter of 2009, the first set of graduates will be ready for placements by April 2009.

=== Employment Services ===
LEF operates a free employment service that connects job seekers and employers. In addition, it runs a career exploration program, operates a resource center, and maintains a "windfall cupboard" that gives clothing for interviews.

=== Training and workshops ===
The organisation provides several programs such as Early Childhood Assistant (ECA) training, Building Maintenance, and The Workplace Hazardous Materials Information System (WHMIS) training.

LEF operates workshops that can incur weekly or one off for a set period. These are usually events that are based on the needs of the local community or intake for trainings during a set time.

=== Language classes ===
The Learning Enrichment Foundation runs an English as a second language program called Language Instruction for Newcomers to Canada (LINC) & English as a Second Language (ESL) which all Permanent Residents or Convention Refugees are eligible to take for free.

In addition, the Foundation runs a Digital Literacy class which aims to improve overall computer skills.

=== Child care ===
LEF operates 25 licensed Child Care Centers for hundreds of children in addition to Before And After Programs.

=== Kitchen services ===
LEF operates a kitchen service that caters to all of the organizations events. This includes local community, staff, and program events.

=== Youth and senior programs ===
LEF has two groups that are age range specific. The Youth program is designed for people ages 18 to 30 years old. The Senior program is designed for anyone that is retired. Both groups have their own calendar events.

=== The Mount Dennis Quilt ===
The Mount Dennis Quilt is an affordable housing project that LEF is leading with the local community and City of Toronto. The Quilt envisions a multi-use building, offering a vibrant streetscape with both the ground level and the first few floors as community space. Above that, the project will create affordable residences and access to much needed supports with the help of community partners.
