= William Sutherland (Ontario politician) =

Canadian politician (1926/27–1998)

William "Bill" Sutherland (1926/27 – June 11, 1998) was a municipal politician in Toronto, Canada. He served on the North York City Council and the Metropolitan Toronto Council for several years, and challenged Mel Lastman for Mayor of North York in 1976.

== Early life and career ==
Sutherland was born in Toronto, received a journalism degree from Ryerson Polytechnical Institute, and worked for a large electrical manufacturing firm before entering political life.

== North York councillor ==
Sutherland was elected to North York's eleventh ward in 1964, following failed bids in 1960 and 1962. He remained a ward councillor until 1974, when he was elected to a seat on the North York Board of Control. The position also gave him an automatic place on the Metropolitan Toronto council.

Sutherland campaigned for Mayor of North York in 1976, as the primary challenger to incumbent mayor Mel Lastman. A The Globe and Mail editorial from the election campaign indicates that his area of expertise was finance, and that his approach to politics was "responsible - if somewhat stiff". He said that North York's council had developed a "circus image" under Lastman, and promised to restore dignity and respect to the institution. Lastman argued that Sutherland's approach to politics was grounded in secretive backroom deals. Lastman won by a convincing margin.

Sutherland spent two years out of politics after losing to Lastman; a newspaper report from 1977 lists him as chair of the North York Historical Board. He was elected to a position on the North York Hydro Commission in 1978, and was later chosen as Commission Chair. In 1980, he encouraged North York residents to delay washing their dishes to preserve electricity during peak hours. After two years on the Hydro Commission, Sutherland was re-elected to North York's Board of Control in 1980 and re-assumed his position on the Metro Council. He was re-elected in 1982.

Sutherland frequently supported the autonomy of municipal councils over perceived encroachments from the provincial and federal governments. He was also critical of the degree of power centred in Metro Chairman Paul Godfrey.

As a Metro Councillor, Sutherland was entrusted with overseeing the police budget. He was also a prominent advocate of the SkyDome and the Metro Zoo. He once advocated against a proposal to study the feasibility of a bridge or tunnel to the Toronto Islands, speaking on the joys of ferry travel. His speech is believed to have helped defeat the proposal.

He opposed an affirmative action plan for North York in 1984, arguing that women in the city were not discriminated against. Sutherland also supported an extension of the Spadina Expressway into downtown Toronto. Near the end of his term in 1985, he called for the abolition of North York's Board of Control.

== Family ==
His wife, Betty Sutherland, was a municipal councillor for Ward 14 in North York from 1972 to 1985. At one time, the Sutherlands were the only elected husband-and-wife duo on a major municipal council in Canada. She was Chairman of Metropolitan Toronto's Parks, Recreation and Property Committee from 1982 to 1985, and a member of the authority's Don Valley Advisory Board from 1981 to 1984. The Betty Sutherland Trail, which runs along the Don River in her old ward, was named in her honour by the former Metropolitan Toronto Council on March 1, 1988, in recognition of her significant contribution to the development of the regional parks system.

Both Sutherlands supported the Progressive Conservative Party, although William Sutherland acknowledged that he was more conservative than his wife. They both retired from council in 1985.

Their son, Paul Sutherland, was also a North York and Toronto city councillor, and an unsuccessful candidate for the Ontario Progressive Conservative Party.

== Retirement ==
Early in 1986, Sutherland wrote against a plan to make the North York Hydro Commission a city department and directly responsible to council. He argued that plans to roll the city's Hydro surplus into general revenue would result in higher electricity rates. He later supported a plan for Toronto to incinerate its own garbage.

He moved to Parry Sound after retiring, and died there in 1998 at age 71.

== Sources ==
- Mike Hanlon, "Politician served North York well", Toronto Star, 13 June 1998, A22.
