= Allan Sparrow =

Allan Sparrow (1944 – April 30, 2008) was a Canadian political activist and long standing city councillor in Toronto. He was instrumental in stopping the Spadina Expressway, setting up civilian oversight of the Toronto Police, promoting cycling in Toronto and gay rights. He was also instrumental in the cancellation of a proposed bridge to the Toronto Island Airport.

== Political career ==
Born in Vancouver, British Columbia, Allan Sparrow moved to Toronto in 1967 with his wife Sue Sparrow. He became an activist, joining the movement to stop the Spadina Expressway, a controversial expressway that would have been built through residential neighborhoods of central Toronto. Sparrow served on the Toronto City Council for three terms, from 1974 until 1980 under the mayoralty of David Crombie. While at Council, he formed the Toronto Cycling Committee. He opposed the old guard of councillors whose support he believed could be bought by developers for block-busting development of inner city neighborhoods. He also formed the Citizens Independent Review of Police Activities, which sought to open up investigations into police misconduct. At the time, there was no civilian oversight of the police force. He gave up his council seat in an attempt to give the seat to an openly gay candidate in the 1980 election.

After his term on Council, he became an information-technology (IT) consultant. He also promoted IT investment in Canada for the federal government.

Sparrow became a key player in the formation of Reform Toronto in 1988 (no connection to the national conservative Reform Party), a municipal watchdog group that published a newspaper, "The Badger", which was distributed door-to-door to target neighbourhoods. The group endorsed seven reform-minded candidates in the 1988 municipal election of which five were elected, helping to create the first majority of reform candidates in Toronto history,. Whitney Smith, another key member of the group, said that "Reform Toronto's success was strongly influenced by Allan's strategic thinking and encouragement of his colleagues."

In 1997 he retired as a consultant to the Toronto Islands, and in 2001 he returned to politics as the founder of Community Air, a volunteer association opposed to expansion of the Toronto Island Airport. The group was successful in stopping a planned bridge to the airport and Sparrow stepped down as leader of Community Air. Despite the bridge cancellation, expansion of the island airport caused him, his wife and their partner Marc Brien to move in 2007 to Stratford, Ontario, to move away from the airport.

He died on April 30, 2008, from colorectal cancer at the London Health Sciences Centre in London, Ontario. Federal NDP leader Jack Layton praised Sparrow as "a good friend, mentor and leader" who "inspired a generation of reform-minded progressives with ahead-of-his-time thinking on environment issues".

== Legacy ==
Sparrow is considered a saint by the God's Gardeners, a fictional religious sect that is the focus of Margaret Atwood's 2009 novel The Year of the Flood.
