= Frank Faubert =

Canadian politician

Frank J. Faubert
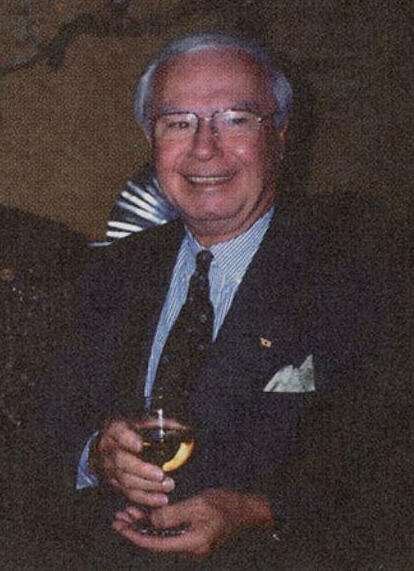
- Faubert, c. 1996

Toronto City Councillor
- In office January 1, 1998 – June 20, 1999
- Preceded by: New ward
- Succeeded by: David Soknacki
- Constituency: Ward 16 - Scarborough Highland Creek

7th Mayor of Scarborough, Ontario
- In office 1994–1997
- Preceded by: Joyce Trimmer
- Succeeded by: position abolished Mel Lastman (as Mayor of Toronto)

Ontario MPP
- In office 1987–1990
- Preceded by: David Warner
- Succeeded by: David Warner
- Constituency: Scarborough—Ellesmere

Scarborough Councillor
- In office 1969–1987

Personal details
- Born: April 25, 1931 Scarborough, Ontario
- Died: June 20, 1999 (aged 68) Scarborough, Ontario
- Party: Liberal
- Spouse: Marilyn Faubert (m. 1956)
- Children: 5
- Occupation: Communications consultant

Frank J. Faubert (April 25, 1931 – June 20, 1999) was a Canadian provincial and municipal politician in Ontario, Canada. He served in the Legislative Assembly of Ontario as a Liberal from 1987 to 1990, and was the final Mayor of Scarborough before its amalgamation into the City of Toronto.

== Background ==
Faubert was born in Scarborough, Ontario. He graduated from Scarborough Collegiate (now known as R. H. King Academy) and was later educated at the Ontario College of Art, receiving a degree in Fine Arts and Commercial Design. He worked as a communications consultant in private life. Faubert was also a member of the Order of St. John of Jerusalem, the Knights of Malta (becoming a Knight of Grace in 1981) and the Order of the Holy Sepulchre. He married Marilyn Porter in 1956. They had five children - Marc, Judi, Jean-Paul, Denine and Michael.

Faubert was a supporter of the Rouge Park and was a founding member of the Rouge Park Alliance. He actively raised funds to support and protect the park.

== Politics ==
He was an alderman and city controller in Scarborough for seventeen years before his election to the provincial assembly, and also served on Metropolitan Toronto Council and was an executive member of the Federation of Canadian Municipalities.

Faubert worked as Robert Stanbury's executive assistant while Stanbury was Minister of Communications.

He ran for the Ontario legislature in the 1971 provincial election, in the constituency of Scarborough West. He finished third, well behind Ontario New Democratic Party leader Stephen Lewis. He ran again in the 1987 election, and defeated NDP incumbent David Warner by 481 votes in the constituency of Scarborough—Ellesmere. For the next three years, Faubert served as a backbench supporter of David Peterson's Liberal government. He served as parliamentary assistant to the Minister of Revenue from 1988 to 1989.

The Liberals lost the 1990 election to the NDP, and Faubert lost his seat to David Warner by over 4,500 votes.

He was elected as Mayor of Scarborough in 1994, succeeding Joyce Trimmer, who had retired, defeating future Progressive Conservative parliamentarian Marilyn Mushinski. In this capacity, he led a public campaign against the 1997 amalgamation of Toronto. When amalgamation became a reality and the City of Scarborough disappeared from the map, Faubert ran for and was elected to the new Toronto municipal council from a Scarborough ward. He also supported Barbara Hall's unsuccessful mayoral campaign in the 1997 Toronto election.

== Death and legacy ==
Faubert died in office in 1999. Frank Faubert Wood Lot on the south east side of Borough Drive was named in his honour, as was Frank Faubert Drive, a residential street just east of the Port Union Road/Lawrence Avenue East intersection in the Rouge Hill neighbourhood of Toronto.

The University of Toronto Scarborough (UTSC) now offers two scholarships in honour of Faubert. The Frank Faubert Scholarship in International Development Studies is awarded to students enrolled in the co-operative program in International Development. The Scarborough Frank Faubert Scholarships in Management is awarded to students enrolled in the 2nd, 3rd, or 4th year of management studies. The scholarship is open to applicants from any secondary school in the former city of Scarborough and is based on financial need.

The city of Toronto honoured him by creating the Frank Faubert Memorial Award for the Scarborough Arts Council's annual art show.
