= Tom Clifford (politician) =

Tom Clifford is a former municipal politician in the City of Toronto, Ontario, Canada.

He served twenty-seven years as an elected official as School Trustee for the Toronto Board of Education and as a City of Toronto Councillor representing the East Toronto and Riverdale area.

In a 1978 federal by-election in the riding of Broadview, Clifford ran as the candidate for the Progressive Conservative Party of Canada but lost by 420 votes to NDP candidate Bob Rae.

He retired from municipal politics in 1991 but attempted to make a comeback in 2003. In March 2003, Toronto Councillor Jack Layton resigned as councillor when he won the leadership of Canada's New Democratic Party. Toronto City Council decided to appoint a replacement until the end the council term that expired that November.

Councillor Michael Tziretas and his assistant Justin Van Dette organized Clifford's campaign by lobbying centre and right-wing councillors for their vote at the special council meeting. It ended up being a classic left vs. right battle as Layton had endorsed former area school trustee Laura Jones. It was also believed that Mayor Mel Lastman was supporting Clifford.

The special council meeting went four ballots and the final ballot was an 18 to 18 tie between Clifford and Jones. Deputy Mayor Case Ootes who was in the chair requested the City Clerk Ulli Watkiss to pull a name out of the hat to break the tie. Jones' name was pulled out and was appointed as the interim councillor to replace Layton.

As councillor, Clifford was an active supporter of many community and civic causes. He was also involved with The Riverdale Hospital (now known as Bridgepoint Health) and the Toronto East General Hospital. He died in 2005.
