= Joyce Trimmer =

Canadian politician

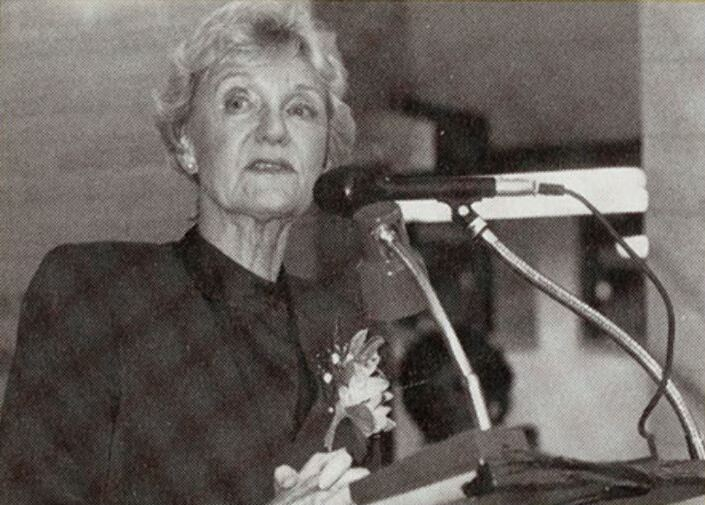
- Trimmer, c. 1991

6th Mayor of Scarborough, Ontario
- In office 1988–1993
- Preceded by: Gus Harris
- Succeeded by: Frank Faubert

Personal details
- Born: November 10, 1927 London, England
- Died: May 17, 2008 (aged 80) Scarborough, Ontario
- Spouse: Douglas Trimmer
- Children: Karen, Andrea

Joyce Trimmer (November 10, 1927 – May 17, 2008) was a Canadian politician. She was the first woman mayor of Scarborough, Ontario.

Born in London, England, Trimmer emigrated to Toronto with her husband Douglas in 1954, where they settled on the Toronto Islands.

Working as a secretary and then a business and typing teacher at Victoria Park Collegiate Institute, Trimmer became interested in politics after opposing development in her community on the Tam O'Shanter golf course lands. After successfully leading the movement to block the development, Trimmer stood in the 1974 municipal election for the position of controller, and was elected. In 1988 she stood in the election for the mayor of Scarborough, Ontario, and won the election with 4800 more votes than the second-place finisher, Norm Kelly. Joyce Trimmer was the first woman elected mayor of Scarborough. A supporter of the environment, she opposed development and worked to protect the lands in what is now the Rouge Park.

She held the position of mayor of Scarborough until her retirement from politics in 1994. In retirement Trimmer moved to Alliston, Ontario and wintered in Florida.

After leaving politics, she chaired the Mike Harris Task Force on Bringing Common Sense to Metro, a committee set up by the provincial Progressive Conservative opposition to investigate reform to the Metro Toronto level of government in the run-up to the 1995 provincial election. She came to oppose the actions of the provincial government when it opted to amalgamate the six municipalities in Metro Toronto to a single city, and eliminate the former Metro Toronto government.

In July 2010, the City renamed McAsphalt Park in Scarborough as Joyce Trimmer Park.
