= Fred Beavis =

Canadian politician (1914–1997)

Frederick J. Beavis

57th Mayor of Toronto, acting
- In office September 1, 1978 – November 30, 1978
- Preceded by: David Crombie
- Succeeded by: John Sewell

Personal details
- Born: October 8, 1914 Toronto, Ontario
- Died: July 11, 1997 (aged 82) Toronto, Ontario
- Spouse: Frances Beavis
- Occupation: business owner (Beavis Bros. Roofing)

Frederick J. Beavis (October 8, 1914 – July 11, 1997) was a longtime city councillor in Toronto, Ontario, who briefly served as interim mayor of the city in 1978. He is to date the only Catholic to have served as Mayor of Toronto in any capacity.

Beavis operated the Beavis Bros. Roofing Co. with his brothers before becoming a full-time politician.

Beavis became an alderman in 1961 in the city's Ward 1 (Ward 8 1974–1985, Metro Ward 8 1985–1988) for Riverdale, Toronto. Except for a brief period between 1975 and 1977, he served on the council until 1988. He served on several committees and sat on Metro Council as well. He was also a member of Metro's executive committee.

After mayor David Crombie had resigned in August 1978 to enter federal politics, city council became deadlocked with regard to voting in a new interim mayor. Beavis and fellow councillor Anne Johnston each had an equal number of votes. With the consent of both candidates, the decision was made to put both names into a hat, and the name picked out of the hat would officially be pronounced interim mayor. Beavis won and became Toronto's mayor until John Sewell was elected by the public two months later.

Beavis lost his council seat to NDP candidate Marilyn Churley in the 1988 municipal election.

Beavis died of pneumonia on July 11, 1997, at St Michael's hospital. His wife Frances died in 1980. Their grandson, Michael Hainsworth, is a broadcast journalist.
