= Ken Morrish =

4th Mayor of Scarborough, Ontario, interim
- In office 1978–1978
- Preceded by: Paul Cosgrove
- Succeeded by: Gus Harris

Personal details
- Born: 1919 Scarborough, Ontario
- Died: July 30, 2006 (aged 86–87) Toronto, Ontario
- Party: Progressive Conservative
- Spouse: Shirley Morrish
- Children: Deborah

Ken Morrish (1919 – July 30, 2006), nicknamed "Mr. Highland Creek" was a Metro Toronto politician. He served the Scarborough, Ontario community as councillor, deputy Metro Toronto Chair and mayor of Scarborough. He is a descendant of the Morrish Family, who were among the original pioneer settlers in Scarborough.

== Background ==
Morrish was born in Scarborough's Highland Creek area to William D. Morrish (1886-1939) and Una Closson in 1919. John Morrish (1820-1908) and his family came from England via Ohio and settled in the Highland Creek area in 1855. He had several children, including William John and Richard (father of W.D. Morrish).

When he was 18, he took responsibility of running the W.D. Morrish Store after his father died. Another Morrish store known as the W.J. Morrish store was operated by his great uncle and was located at Kingston Road and Meadowvale. The W.D. Morrish general store was located at the corner of Old Kingston Road and Morrish Rd. Based on his success, he constructed several other buildings in the Highland Creek area, including Amigos Restaurant and Bar at Lawson Rd. and Old Kingston Rd. and the Highland Creek Plaza at the corner of Morrish Road and Old Kingston Rd.

During World War II, he served as a Flight Lieutenant in the Royal Canadian Air Force. In 1945, he married his wife Shirley. He is the father-in-law to disgraced former Toronto city councillor and budget chief Tom Jakobek. Morrish was a longtime horse racing and show horse aficionado.

== Municipal politics ==
Morrish was a city councillor for the borough and city of Scarborough. He was also Metro Councillor for Scarborough Highland Creek and in 1978 served as interim Mayor of Scarborough. He was a legend in Scarborough and Metro Toronto politics and was dubbed the "Dean of Metro Toronto".

While Morrish was councillor, he endorsed the construction of the Scarborough Expressway, which was a planned extension of the F.G. Gardiner Expressway from Leslie Street to Highway 401 on the border of Scarborough and Pickering. By the mid-1990s plans have changed and the Gardiner Expressway merged north to the base of the Don Valley Parkway.

In 1997, Morrish retired from politics.

== Later life ==
Morrish died at his home following a disabling stroke about four years earlier. He was 87. He and his wife Shirley are buried at St. Margarets-in-the-Pines Anglican Church in Scarborough.

In 1999, the group of softball diamonds at East Point Park was renamed "The Ken Morrish Softball Complex".
