= Gus Harris =

Canadian politician (1908–2000)

5th Mayor of Scarborough, Ontario
- In office 1978–1988
- Preceded by: Ken Morrish, interim
- Succeeded by: Joyce Trimmer

31st Reeve of Scarborough, Ontario
- In office 1956–1957
- Preceded by: Oliver E. Crockford
- Succeeded by: Albert Campbell

Personal details
- Born: Augustus Vincent Patrick John Harris; July 17, 1908 Liverpool, England
- Died: February 20, 2000 (aged 91) Scarborough, Ontario, Canada
- Party: New Democratic Party
- Other political affiliations: Co-operative Commonwealth Federation
- Spouse: Anna
- Children: 5

Augustus Vincent Patrick John Harris (July 17, 1908 – February 20, 2000) was a Canadian politician. He was born in Liverpool, England. He was the mayor of Scarborough, Ontario from 1978 to 1988. Although he was a relatively conservative, pro-development mayor, Harris's political roots were in the labour movement, the Co-operative Commonwealth Federation and the New Democratic Party. He was a long-time socialist and pacifist who was a conscientious objector during World War II.

== Early life ==
Gus Harris grew up in poverty in Liverpool, in a home with no indoor plumbing, saying later that thin soup was his usual supper and an egg or apple were considered luxuries. His father died when he was three years old. When he was ten, his mother, an Irish Roman Catholic, married his Protestant stepfather.

Harris later recalled: "I was born to a great degree of poverty... in an area where there was tremendous religious bigotry and a deep feeling of racial superiority of the British against other nations."

Harris's stepfather was a boilermaker and "was always out of work or striking in sympathy with other people or being locked out. So early in my life I was molded as a socialist and a pacifist because I saw a generation of young people absolutely deprived of any sense of worth because in the early 1920s in England the poverty was just as bad as in the Depression."

Seeing posters promoting immigration to Canada by depicting "golden fields of corn", Harris and several friends decided to go to Canada in 1929 to make their fortunes and then return to England after six months. However, when he arrived he was pennliless, having had his baggage stolen. He remained in Canada and made a life, eventually marrying. When World War II broke out in 1939, and influenced by the United Church of Canada, he declared himself a conscientious objector and was sent to Banff, Alberta to cut down trees. During this period, his first child was born but died after ten days; Harris was not permitted to go home for the funeral.

== Political career ==
After the war, he got involved with the co-operative movement, credit unions, and trade unions and entered politics in Scarborough, first being elected as a school board trustee in 1946 and became chairman of the school board in May 1949 after the previous chairman resigned. He was first elected to Scarborough Township council in 1950, and then was elected reeve of the township in 1956, unseating eight-term incumbent Oliver E. Crockford. After being defeated by Albert Campbell in the following year's election, he went on to return to Scarborough council and served on the Board of Control when the township became a borough and then a city in 1983.

He was also progressive on social issues calling for gay rights at a 1979 human rights rally.

Harris never accepted financial donations to his political campaigns from any source so that he would not be captive to any interests. As mayor, he refused to use the chauffeur-driven limousine that was offered to Metropolitan Toronto's city and borough mayors and continued to live in a modest, semi-detached house that he and his wife had bought in 1942. Shortly before the nomination deadlines for the 1988 municipal elections in Ontario, Harris announced he would not seek re-election as mayor, and was officially succeeded by Joyce Trimmer as mayor, in early December 1988.

== Retirement ==
Although retired from active politics, Harris occasionally spoke on various municipal issues in the late 1980s and early 1990s, such as transit concerns and the proposal for the potential amalgamation of Metropolitan Toronto. On February 20, 2000, He died at the age of 91 due to complications from Parkinson's disease. A nature trail that passes through Warden Woods Park on Taylor-Massey Creek was named in his honour.

== Memorable quotes ==
On 11 December 1973 during a debate on the fate of the community on the Toronto Islands, Harris, a Controller at the time, was firmly against the idea of retaining the houses. He said at one point, "These people have launched as vicious a propaganda campaign as I've ever seen. You can see the fine hand of Island public relations in this City proposal. I've had it with their heart-rending stories." Joyce Trimmer, Harris' successor as mayor originally lived on the Toronto Islands.

In July 1988, just prior to his retirement as mayor, he spoke about how Scarborough was maturing as a city. He said, "They won't be calling this place Scarberia much longer."
