= Electoral history of Jack Layton =

Overview of Jack Layton's electoral history

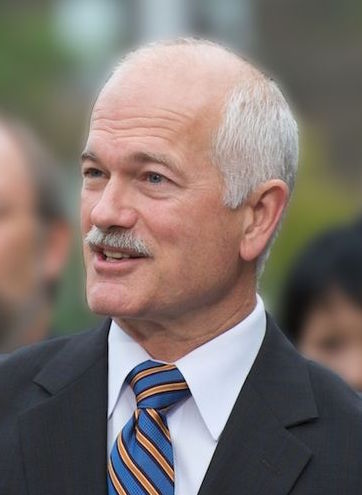
Layton, 2008

This is the electoral history of Jack Layton, the leader of the New Democratic Party (NDP) from 2003 to 2011 and leader of the Official Opposition in 2011. From 2004 to 2011, he was the NDP member of Parliament (MP) for Toronto—Danforth. Previous to his career in federal politics, Layton sat on Toronto City Council from 1982 to 1991 and again from 1994 to 2003, and was the runner up in the 1991 mayoral election.

== Overview ==
Electoral history of Jack Layton — NDP federal election performance as leader
Year	Type	Party	Votes			Seats		Position
Year	Type	Party	Total	%	±%	Total	±	Position
2004	Federal	New Democratic	2,127,403	15.68%	+7.17%	19 / 308	+6	Fourth party
2006	Federal	New Democratic	2,589,597	17.48%	+1.80%	29 / 308	+10	Fourth party
2008	Federal	New Democratic	2,515,288	18.18%	+0.70%	37 / 308	+6	Fourth party
2011	Federal	New Democratic	4,508,474	30.63%	+12.45%	103 / 308	+66	Official opposition

Electoral history of Jack Layton — Municipal and federal constituency elections
Year	Type	Riding	Party	Votes for Layton				Result	Swing
Year	Type	Riding	Party	Total	%	P.	±%	Result	Swing
1982	Toronto ward	Ward 6	Independent	9,892	27.39	2nd	-	Lost	-
1985	Toronto ward	Ward 6	Independent	9,037	62.63	1st	+35.24%	Elected	-
1988	Toronto ward	Ward 6	Independent	5,486	78.75	1st	+16.12%	Elected	-
1991	Toronto mayoral	N/A	New Democratic	64,044	32.88	2nd	-	Lost	-
1993	Federal general	Rosedale	New Democratic	5,547	10.78	4th	-4.28%	Lost	Gain
1994	Toronto ward	Ward 25	New Democratic	10,117	49.19	1st	-	Elected	-
1997	Federal general	Broadview—Greenwood	New Democratic	13,903	32.77	2nd	+18.82%	Lost	Hold
1997	Toronto ward	Ward 25	New Democratic	15,045	29.17	1st	-20.02%	Elected	-
2000	Toronto ward	Ward 30	New Democratic	8,671	59.74	1st	+30.57%	Elected	-
2004	Federal general	Toronto—Danforth	New Democratic	22,198	46.34	1st	+18.69%	Elected	Gain
2006	Federal general	Toronto—Danforth	New Democratic	24,412	48.42	1st	+2.08%	Elected	Hold
2008	Federal general	Toronto—Danforth	New Democratic	20,323	44.78	1st	−3.64%	Elected	Hold
2011	Federal general	Toronto—Danforth	New Democratic	29,235	60.80	1st	+16.02%	Elected	Hold

== Municipal ward elections ==
=== 1982 election ===
1982 election — Ward 6
Candidate	Votes	%
John Sewell (x)	13,419	37.16
Jack Layton	9,892	27.39
Gordon Chong (x)	8,213	22.74
Oscar Wong	2,479	6.86
Bill Beatty	1,563	4.33
Martin Amber	546	1.51
Total	36,112	100.00
Source: Toronto Star

=== 1985 election ===
1985 election — Ward 6 Metro
Candidate	Votes	%
Jack Layton (x)	9,037	62.63
Pearl Loo	1,972	13.67
Edward Jackson	1,824	12.64
Lex Dunkelman	1,183	8.20
Citizen Amber	414	2.87
Total	14,430	100.00
Source: Toronto Star

=== 1988 election ===
1988 election — Ward 6
Candidate	Votes	%
Jack Layton (x)	5,486	78.75
Lois MacMillan-Walker	1,480	21.25
Total	6,966	100.00
Source: Toronto Star

=== 1994 election ===
1994 election — Ward 25
Candidate	Votes	%
Jack Layton	10,117	49.19
Paul Raina	3,927	19.09
Nola Crew	3,898	18.95
John Stavropoulos	2,080	10.11
Amber Martin	546	2.65
Total	20,568	100.00
Source: City of Toronto

=== 1997 election ===
1997 election — Ward 25 (Don River)
Candidate	Votes	%
Jack Layton	15,045	29.97
Pam McConnell	8,359	16.65
Peter Tabuns	8,141	16.21
Soo Wong	7,212	14.36
Spiros Papathanasakis	6,590	13.12
Terry Brackett	1,546	3.08
Mike Armstrong	1,429	2.85
Wendy Forrest	947	1.89
Larry Tabin	939	1.87
Total	50,208	100.00
Source: City of Toronto

=== 2000 election ===
2000 election – Ward 30
Candidate	Votes	%
Jack Layton (x)	8,671	59.74
Linda Lynch	3,750	25.84
Ty Daniels	817	5.63
Jeff Layton	627	4.32
Ghuffar Rabbani	523	3.60
Joseph Norte	126	0.87
Total	14,514	100.00
Source: City of Toronto

== Municipal mayoral election ==
=== 1991 election ===
1991 election — Mayor
Candidate	Votes	%
June Rowlands	113,993	58.53
Jack Layton	64,044	32.88
Susan Fish	8,123	4.17
Don Andrews	1,968	1.01
Jim Harris	1,760	0.90
Ken Campbell	1,708	0.88
Joe Young	1,196	0.61
William McKeown	1,023	0.53
Ben Kerr	952	0.49
Total	194,767	100.00
Source: Toronto Star

== Federal constituency elections ==
=== 1993 general election ===
1993 Canadian federal election: Rosedale
Party	Candidate	Votes	%	±%	Expenditures
Liberal	Bill Graham	27,707	49.98	+8.78	$54,087
Progressive Conservative	David MacDonald	12,018	21.68	-20.12	$60,961
Reform	Daniel Jovkovic	7,048	12.71	–	$25,016
New Democratic Party	Jack Layton	5,937	10.71	-4.28	$44,872
National	Martin Lanigan	1,091	1.97	–	$6,964
Natural Law	Doug Henning	839	1.51	–	$37,086
Green	Leslie Hunter	479	0.86	+0.22	$380
N/A (Christian Freedom)	Linda Dale Gibbons	214	0.39	–	$200
Marxist-Leninist	Steve Rutchinski	61	0.11	–	$205
Abolitionist	Y. Patrice d'Audibert-Garcien	43	0.08	–	$0
Total valid votes		55,437	99.12		
Total rejected ballots		491	0.88		
Turnout		55,928	61.71		
Electors on the lists		90,630			
Liberal gain from Progressive Conservative		Swing		-14.5	
Source(s) Source: Thirty-fifth General Election, 1993: Official Voting Results, Published by the Chief Electoral Officer of Canada. Financial figures taken from official contributions and expenses provided by Elections Canada.

=== 1997 general election ===
1997 Canadian federal election: Broadview—Greenwood
Party	Candidate	Votes	%	±%	Expenditures
Liberal	Dennis Mills	21,108	49.76	-11.31	–
New Democratic	Jack Layton	13,903	32.77	+18.82	–
Reform	Brian Higgins	3,247	7.65	-3.64	–
Progressive Conservative	Dianne Garrels	3,238	7.63	-1.71	–
Green	Karen McCarthy	426	1.00	–	–
Independent	Kevin Mark Clarke	211	0.50	–	–
Natural Law	Bob Hyman	205	0.48	-0.53	–
Marxist–Leninist	Gurdev Singh	85	0.20	-0.04	–
Total valid votes		42,423	100.00		
Liberal hold		Swing		-15.1	
Source(s) Source: Thirty-sixth General Election, 1997: Official Voting Results, Published by the Chief Electoral Officer of Canada. Elections Canada.

=== 2004 general election ===
2004 Canadian federal election: Toronto—Danforth
Party	Candidate	Votes	%	±%	Expenditures
New Democratic	Jack Layton	22,198	46.34	+18.69	$ 72,751.01
Liberal	Dennis Mills	19,803	41.34	-10.56	73,909.41
Conservative	Loftus Cuddy	2,975	6.21	-9.51	12,400.00
Green	Jim Harris	2,575	5.38	+3.42	11,139.51
Marijuana	Scott Yee	265	0.55	-0.76	–
Marxist–Leninist	Marcell Rodden	84	0.18	-0.03	–
Total valid votes/Expense limit		47,900	99.44		$ 75,271.84
Total rejected ballots		269	0.56		
Turnout		48,169	64.10		
New Democratic gain from Liberal		Swing		-14.6	
Source(s) "Official Voting Results – Thirty-eighth General Election". (Table 12). "Financial Reports: Candidate's Electoral Campaign Return". Elections Canada.

=== 2006 general election ===
2006 Canadian federal election: Toronto—Danforth
Party	Candidate	Votes	%	±%	Expenditures
New Democratic	Jack Layton	24,412	48.42	+2.08	$ 74,966.33
Liberal	Deborah Coyne	17,256	34.23	-7.11	74,304.11
Conservative	Kren Clausen	4,992	9.90	+3.69	32,138.91
Green	Al Hart	3,583	7.11	+1.73	6,770.73
Marxist–Leninist	Marcell Rodden	172	0.34	+0.16	–
Total valid votes/Expense limit		50,415	99.52	–	$ 76,419.79
Total rejected ballots		242	0.48	-0.08	
Turnout		50,657	67.67	+3.57	
New Democratic hold		Swing		+4.6	
Source(s) "Official Voting Results – Thirty-ninth General Election". (Table 12). "Financial Reports: Candidate's Electoral Campaign Return". Elections Canada.

=== 2008 general election ===
2008 Canadian federal election: Toronto—Danforth
Party	Candidate	Votes	%	±%	Expenditures
New Democratic	Jack Layton	20,323	44.78	-3.64	$ 79,280.87
Liberal	Andrew Lang	13,336	29.38	-4.85	65,423.39
Green	Sharon Howarth	5,995	13.21	+6.10	37,793.55
Conservative	Christina Perreault	5,287	11.65	+1.75	16,514.92
Animal Alliance	Marie Crawford	175	0.39	–	–
Independent	John Richardson	130	0.29	–	38.98
Marxist–Leninist	Marcell Rodden	87	0.19	-0.15	–
Canadian Action	Bahman Yazdanfar	54	0.12	–	125.00
Total valid votes/Expense limit		45,387	99.58	–	$ 82,496.98
Total rejected ballots		191	0.42	-0.06	
Turnout		45,578	60.91	-6.76	
New Democratic hold		Swing		+0.6	
Source(s) "Official Voting Results – Fortieth General Election 2008". (Table 12). "Financial Reports: Candidate's Electoral Campaign Return". Elections Canada.

=== 2011 general election ===
2011 Canadian federal election: Toronto—Danforth
Party	Candidate	Votes	%	±%	Expenditures
New Democratic	Jack Layton	29,235	60.80	+16.02	$ 71,037.96
Liberal	Andrew Lang	8,472	17.62	-11.76	62,218.04
Conservative	Katarina Von Koenig	6,885	14.32	+2.67	4,113.58
Green	Adriana Mugnatto-Hamu	3,107	6.46	-6.75	47,241.28
Animal Alliance	Marie Crawford	387	0.80	+0.41	–
Total valid votes/Expense limit		48,086	99.41	–	$ 84,621.69
Total rejected ballots		284	0.59	+0.17	
Turnout		48,370	64.90	+3.99	
New Democratic hold		Swing		+13.9	
Source(s) "Official Voting Results – Forty-First General Election 2011". (Table 12). "Financial Reports: Candidate's Electoral Campaign Return". Elections Canada.

== Federal general elections ==
Layton led the New Democratic Party in four general elections.

=== 2004 general election ===
Canadian Federal Election, 2004 - Parties, Leaders, Seats Won and Popular Vote
Party	Leaders	Seats Won	Popular Vote
Liberal	Paul Martin^{1}	135	36.7%
Conservative	Stephen Harper^{2}	99	29.6%
Bloc Québécois	Gilles Duceppe	54	12.4%
New Democratic Party	Jack Layton	19	15.7%
Independent	–	1	0.5%
Total		308	94.9%^{3}
Sources: Library of Parliament – History of Federal Ridings since 1867

^{1} Prime Minister when election was called; Prime Minister after election.
^{2} Leader of the Opposition when election was called; Leader of the Opposition after the election.
^{3} Table does not include parties which received votes but did not elect any members.

=== 2006 general election ===
Canadian Federal Election, 2006 - Parties, Leaders, Seats Won and Popular Vote
Party	Leaders	Seats Won	Popular Vote
Conservative	Stephen Harper^{1}	124	36.3%
Liberal	Paul Martin^{2}	103	30.2%
Bloc Québécois	Gilles Duceppe	51	10.5%
New Democratic Party	Jack Layton	29	17.5%
Independent	–	1	0.6%
Total		308	95.1%^{3}
Sources: Library of Parliament – History of Federal Ridings since 1867

^{1} Leader of the Opposition when election was called; Prime Minister after election.
^{2} Prime Minister when election was called; Member of Parliament after the election.
^{3} Table does not include parties which received votes but did not elect any members.

=== 2008 general election ===
Canadian Federal Election, 2008 - Parties, Leaders, Seats Won and Popular Vote
Party	Leaders	Seats Won	Popular Vote
Conservative	Stephen Harper^{1}	143	37.7%
Liberal	Stéphane Dion^{2}	77	26.3%
Bloc Québécois	Gilles Duceppe	49	10.0%
New Democratic Party	Jack Layton	37	18.2%
Independent	–	2	0.7%
Total		308	92.9%^{3}
Sources: Library of Parliament – History of Federal Ridings since 1867

^{1} Prime Minister when election was called; Prime Minister after election.
^{2} Leader of the Opposition when election was called; Leader of the Opposition after the election.
^{3} Table does not include parties which received votes but did not elect any members.

=== 2011 general election ===
Canadian Federal Election, 2011 - Parties, Leaders, Seats Won and Popular Vote
Party	Leaders	Seats Won	Popular Vote
Conservative	Stephen Harper^{1}	166	39.6%
New Democratic Party	Jack Layton^{2}	103	30.6%
Liberal	Michael Ignatieff^{3}	34	18.9%
Bloc Québécois	Gilles Duceppe	4	6.0%
Green	Elizabeth May	1	3.9%
Total		308	99.0%^{4}
Sources: Library of Parliament – History of Federal Ridings since 1867

^{1} Prime Minister when election was called; Prime Minister after election.
^{2} Leader of a third party when election was called; Leader of the Opposition after the election.
^{3} Leader of the Opposition when election was called; not a Member of Parliament after the election.
^{4} Table does not include parties which received votes but did not elect any members.

== Party leadership elections ==
Layton participated in one leadership election: the 2003 New Democratic Party leadership election.

Candidate	Member votes		Labour votes		Points won	
Jack Layton	22,453	51.4%	572	59.8%	31,150	53.5%
Bill Blaikie	10,914	25.0%	227	23.7%	14,365	24.7%
Lorne Nystrom	4,865	11.1%	35	3.7%	5,397	9.3%
Joe Comartin	3,289	7.5%	79	8.3%	4,490	7.7%
Pierre Ducasse	1,577	3.6%	38	4.0%	2,155	3.7%
Bev Meslo	554	1.3%	6	0.6%	645	1.1%
Total	43,652	100.0%	957	100.0%	58,202	100.0%
