= Elizabeth Amer =

Canadian politician

Toronto City Councillor for Ward 5
- In office 1988–1994
- Preceded by: Dale Martin
- Succeeded by: Dan Leckie

Personal details
- Born: 1938 (age 87–88) Toronto, Ontario, Canada

Elizabeth Amer (born 1938) is a Canadian politician who served on Toronto City Council as councillor for Ward 5 from 1988 to 1994.

== Background ==
Born in Toronto, Ontario, she is the daughter of Margaret Coleman, a "den mother" to the city's arts scene who had played a key role in the establishment of Coach House Books, and the sister of poet Victor Coleman. She had originally been drawn to life on the Toronto Islands through visiting her grandparents, who lived on Ward's Island; Amer moved in with her grandmother after completing high school, and later inherited the house after her mother's death.

She was an editor of a local Toronto Island community newspaper, The Goose and Duck, in the early 1970s. She attained citywide prominence in 1980 as an advocate for residents of the Toronto Islands when the Metropolitan Toronto Council of that era attempted to evict them on the grounds that the islands were zoned as parkland. Her activism successfully staved off the eviction, and eventually led to the passage of new provincial legislation in 1993 to protect the homes on the islands by granting the residents 99-year leases on their properties.

She remained an outspoken activist for the rights of island residents through the 1980s, including as spokesperson for the island's residents association.

== Political career ==
She ran in the 1988 Toronto municipal election, winning a seat as the councillor for Ward 5 over challenger Peter Maloney, although Maloney claimed during the campaign that Amer's endorsement by the Metro New Democratic Party meant that he felt like he was really running against Jack Layton. During the election campaign, she spoke out against a common practice whereby wealthy lawyers and developers, whose offices were largely located in Ward 5, were effectively able to gain a double vote in both Ward 5 and their home wards by listing their office as a secondary residence.

She was one of six councillors, alongside Layton, Barbara Hall, Kay Gardner, Nadine Nowlan and Tom Jakobek, appointed to the new executive committee after the election.

In one of her first significant acts on council, she opposed a waterfront condominium project whose developer had appealed to the Ontario Municipal Board for a bypass of the city's approval process. In 1989, she brokered a compromise that approved an expansion proposal at the Art Gallery of Ontario, by allowing the renovation to proceed in exchange for the gallery dropping its controversial request to have much of Grange Park converted into a parking lot.

In 1990, Amer was one of five councillors, alongside Layton, Nowlan, Howard Levine and Marilyn Churley, who opposed a Toronto city council resolution supporting a bid by the City of Toronto for the 1996 Olympic Games. Also in 1990, she served on the Festival of Festivals jury for the Best Canadian Film, alongside Robert Daudelin, Monika Treut, Patricia Gruben and Jay Switzer.

She was reelected to a second term on council in the 1991 Toronto municipal election. In early 1992, mayor June Rowlands appointed Amer, alongside Hall, Jakobek and Betty Disero, to a committee tasked to negotiate over the redevelopment of the railway lands near the SkyDome.

Amer was on the Toronto Mayor's Committee on Aging in 1993. In the same year she advocated for improvements to the Martin Goodman Trail after people reported problems with an apartment building whose front door opened directly onto the trail, and was one of seven councillors who voted against renaming a portion of Peter Street to Blue Jays Way.

In 1993 Amer co-authored the book Taking Action: Working Together for Positive Change in Your Community, a grassroots organizing guide.

She did not run for re-election in the 1994 Toronto municipal election; she alleged that she was pushed out by the NDP establishment, although according to Olivia Chow the NDP merely declined to block Lee Zaslofsky from challenging Amer for the nomination. She was succeeded by Dan Leckie, while Zaslofsky ran to succeed Dale Martin in Ward 6 instead of challenging Leckie, and himself lost to Chow.

== Post-political life ==
She was appointed to the board of the Ontario College of Pharmacists by the government of Bob Rae in 1995.

She was subsequently founding president of Friends of the Toronto Public Library. In his book Witness to a City, later Toronto mayor David Miller also credited Amer as one of the driving forces behind the creation of the Toronto Public Library's Lillian H. Smith branch in 1995.

Her prominence as an activist was renewed in the early 2000s when provincial environment minister Chris Stockwell compared island residents to squatters, and argued that the prior legislation protecting their rights should be overturned so that the residents could be evicted to turn the island into parkland. The provincial government again backed off of the threat.

As of 2023, Amer still lived on the Toronto Islands.
