= 1988 Toronto municipal election =

1988 Toronto mayoral election
- November 14, 1988
- Turnout: 31%
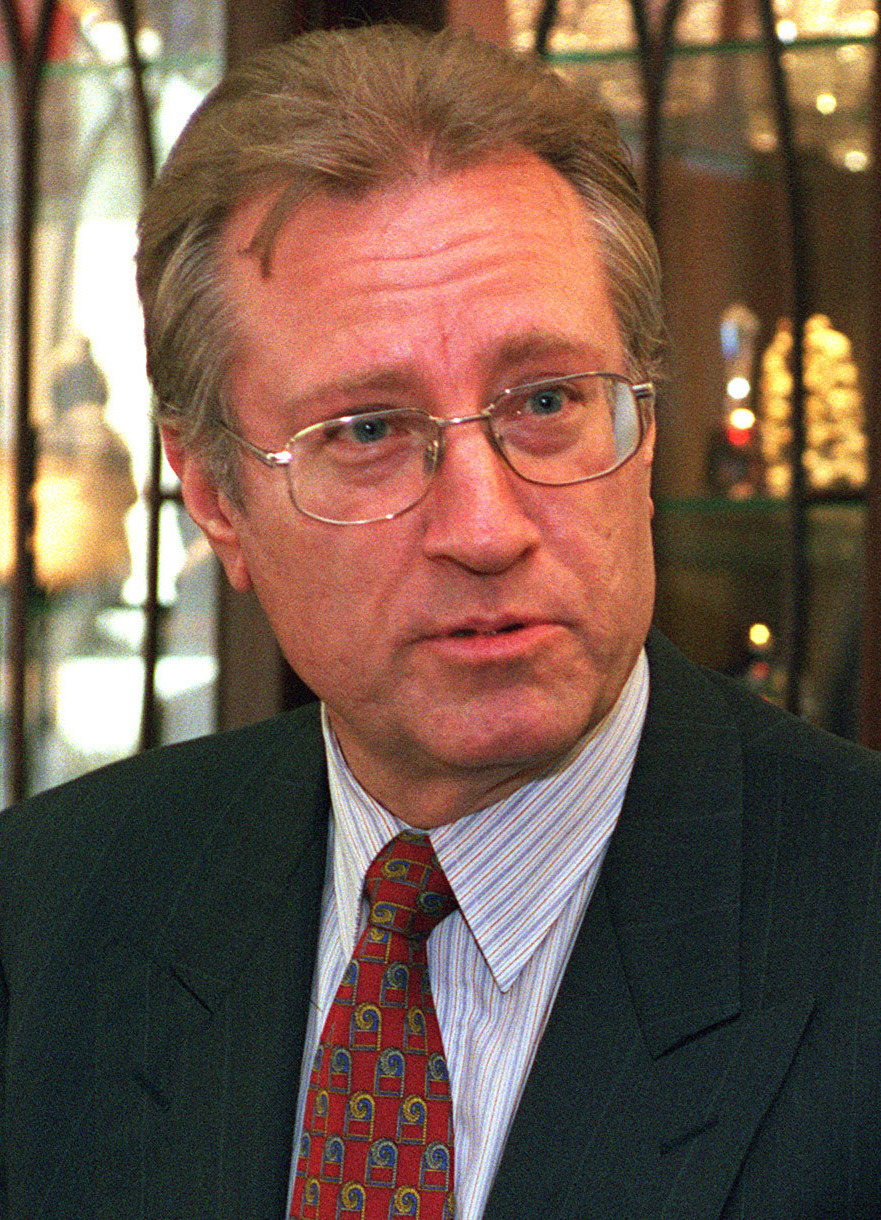
		CW	BR
Candidate	Art Eggleton	Carolann Wright	Bill Roberts
Popular vote	91,180	24,479	7,235
Percentage	64.9%	17.4%	5.1%
Mayor of Toronto before election
Art Eggleton
Elected Mayor of Toronto
Art Eggleton

The 1988 Toronto municipal election was held to elect members of municipal councils, school boards, and hydro commissions in the six municipalities that made up Metropolitan Toronto, Ontario, Canada. The election was held November 14, 1988. This election also marked the abolition of Boards of Control in North York, Etobicoke, Scarborough, and York. The Toronto Board of Control had been abolished in 1969.

== Metro ==
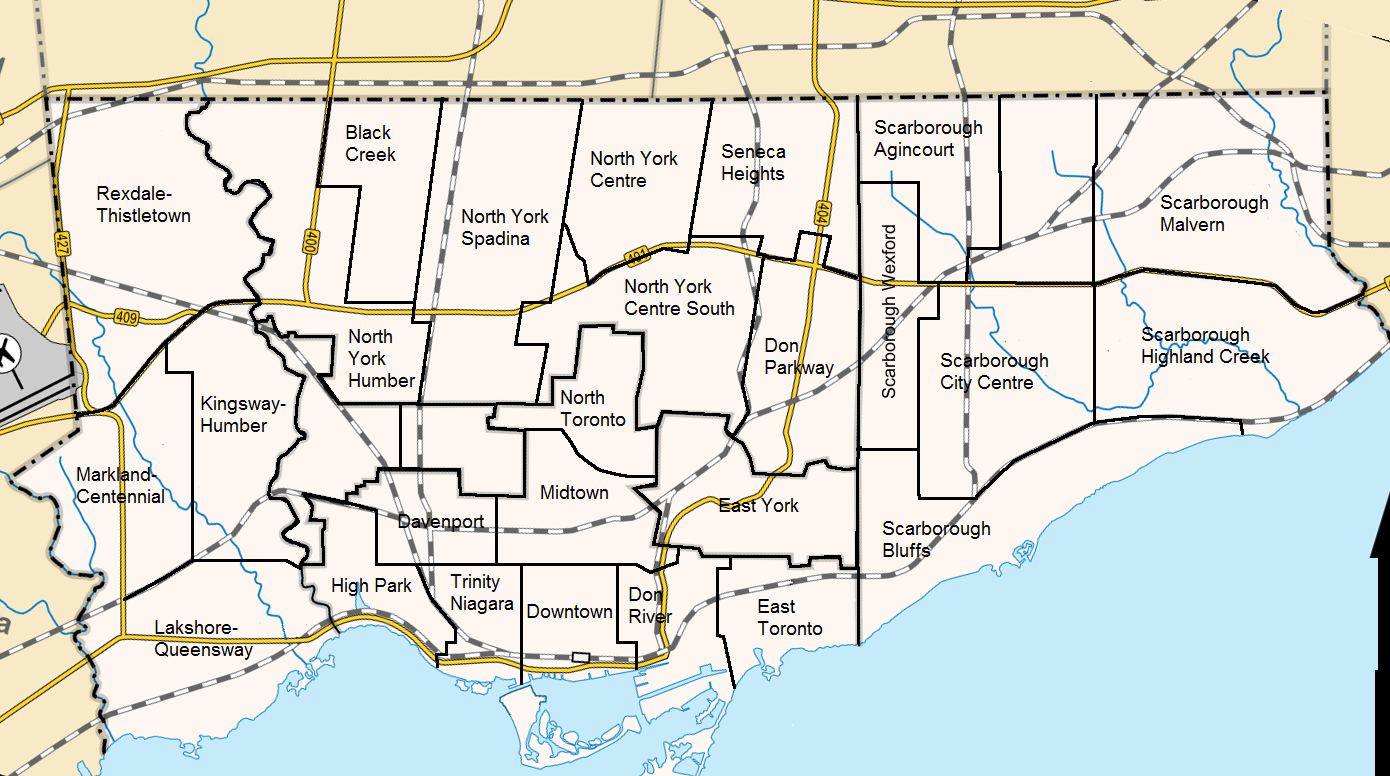
The electoral divisions used for Metro in the 1988 election

The 1988 campaign was the first time most members of Metro Toronto were directly elected. Toronto had moved to direct elections in 1985, but the other cities had still had a selection of council members dually seated at Metro. In the new council only the five mayors would be granted automatic Metro seats.

East York
Peter Oyler - 11,088
Avril Usha Velupillai - 7,885
Bob Willis - 2,043

Lakeshore Queensway
Chris Stockwell - 10,442
Morley Kells - 7,790

Kingsway Humber
Dennis Flynn - 16,642
Jack Soules - 4,497

Markland Centennial
Dick O'Brien - 13,049
Leonard Braithwaite - 7,296

Rexdale Thistletown
Lois Griffin - acclaimed

North York Humber
Mario Gentile - 19,697
Angelo Natale - 4,795

Black Creek
Maria Augimeri - 19,244
Camilo Tiqui - 2,462
Sherland Chhangur - 2,391

North York Spadina
Howard Moscoe - acclaimed

North York Centre South
Bev Salmon - 10,618
Gordon Chong - 7,223

North York Centre
Norman Gardner - acclaimed

Don Parkway
Marie Labette - 14,443
Courtney Doidron - 3,108

Seneca Heights
Joan King - acclaimed

Scarborough Bluffs
Brian Ashton - 9,957
Bill Belfontaine - 8,348

Scarborough Wexford
Maureen Prinsloo - 6,007
Bryan Prettie - 4,922

Scarborough Centre
Brian Harrison - 8,516
Barry Christensen - 5,150
Keith Sutherland - 1,906

Scarborough Malvern
Bob Sanders - 4,780
Hugh Evelyn - 3,575
Chris Burry - 1,309
Yaqoob Khan - 1,308
Roy Paluoja - 448

Scarborough Highland Creek
Ken Morrish - acclaimed

Scarborough Agincourt
Scott Cavalier - 8,175
Eden Gajraj - 1,861

High Park
Derwyn Shea - 11,473
Ben Grys - 9,204

Trinity Niagara
Joe Pantalone - 8,717
Lamartine Silva - 3,864

Davenport
Richard Gilbert - 7,880
Dennis Fotinos - 5,133

North Toronto
Anne Johnston - acclaimed

Midtown
Ila Bossons - 7,924
Ying Hope - 7,196
Bill Granger - 4,375

Downtown
Dale Martin - 10,322
Janly Pang - 3,950

Don River
Roger Hollander - 11,785
Richard Yue - 5,447

East Toronto
Paul Christie - 11,187
Linda Lynch - 9,361

York Eglinton
Mike Colle - 11,527
Jacquie Chic - 3,571

York Humber
Alan Tonks - acclaimed

Lakeshore Queensway Councillor Chris Stockwell resigned when he won a seat in the 1990 Provincial Election. A by-election was held on November 29, 1990.

Blake Kinahan - 1,770
Bruce Davis - 1,520
Ron Barr - 1,150
Jeff Knoll - 994
Richard Clupa - 657
Helen Wursta - 550
Kevin McGourty - 221
Agnes Ugolini Potts - 213
Branko Gasperlin - 180
Aileen Anderson - 157
Maureen Hunter Dennis - 107
Stephen Elkerton - 62

== Toronto ==
=== Mayor ===
Incumbent mayor Art Eggleton faced little opposition in his bid for his fourth term of office. His closest opponent was New Democrat Carolann Wright, a community activist running on an anti-poverty platform.

Results
Art Eggleton - 91,180
Carolann Wright - 24,479
Bill Roberts - 7,235
Don Andrews - 5,690
John Kellerman - 3,197
Jim Atherton - 2,459
Ben Kerr - 2,204
Zoltan Szoboszlov - 2,202
Alan Ritchie - 1,869

=== City council ===
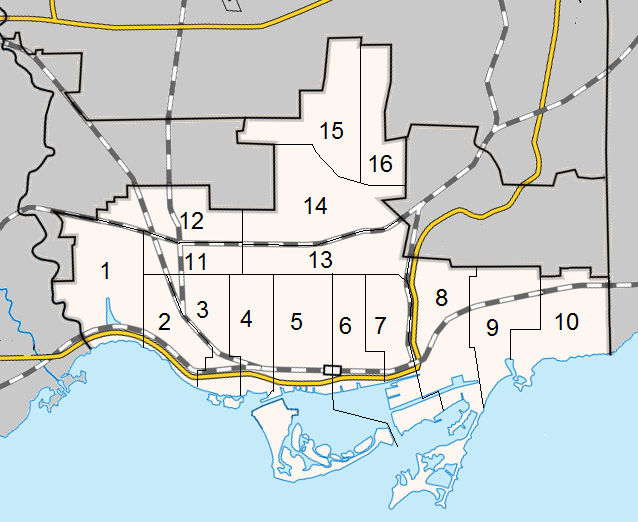
Ward boundaries used in the 1988 election

There was the largest turnover in councillors in this election since the 1972 election. The left on council ran a joint Reform Toronto campaign focused on curbing the development industry. The vote was a major triumph for the left on city council with two prominent and long-serving conservatives defeated: Fred Beavis, who had served on council since 1961, was defeated by environmentalist Marilyn Churley, and in the north end, conservative Michael Gee lost to Howard Levine.

Ward 1 (Swansea and Bloor West Village)
William Boytchuk (incumbent) - 7,686
David Garrick - 4,092

Ward 2 (Parkdale
Chris Korwin-Kuczynski (incumbent) - 7,242
Francine Dick - 1,312
Michael Sarazen - 412
Thomas Bose - 348

Ward 3 (Brockton)
Tony O'Donohue (incumbent) - 4,269
Jimmy Talpa - 837

Ward 4 (Trinity-Bellwoods and Little Italy)
Martin Silva - 3,529
Nick Figliano - 1,494
Tony Letra - 1,266
Joey Pimental - 675

Ward 5 (Financial District, Toronto - University of Toronto)
Elizabeth Amer- 3,481
Peter Maloney - 2,336
Rachel Foulkes - 1,226
Steve BFG Johnson - 417
Ray Barker - 224

Ward 6 Downtown East
Jack Layton (incumbent) - 5,486
Lois MacMillan-Walker - 1,480

Ward 7 (Regent Park and Cabbagetown)
Barbara Hall (incumbent) - 4,748
Mike Armstrong - 1,536
Allan Boudreau - 499

Ward 8 (Riverdale)
Marilyn Churley - 5,771
Fred Beavis (incumbent) - 4,192
Paul Ralna - 1,028

Ward 9 (East Danforth)
Tom Clifford (incumbent) - 5,220
Mitchell Kosny - 3,498
Michael Tegtmeyer - 370

Ward 10 (The Beaches)
Tom Jakobek (incumbent) - 9,782
Glenn Middleton - 2,443

Ward 11 (The Junction)
Rob Maxwell - 3,299
Peter Zahakos - 3,119
Melania Leshko - 545

Ward 12 (Davenport and Corso Italia)
Betty Disero (incumbent) - acclaimed

Ward 13 (The Annex and Yorkville)
Nadine Nowlan (incumbent) - acclaimed

Ward 14 (Forest Hill)
Howard Levine - 5,477
Michael Gee (incumbent) - 4,995

Ward 15 (Western North Toronto)
Kay Gardner (incumbent) - 7,955
Jeffrey Stutz - 1,966
Bob Murphy - 1,591

Ward 16 (Davisville and Lawrence Park)
Michael Walker (incumbent) - 5,436
Malcolm Martini - 5,249
Joanne Short - 722

Results are taken from the November 15, 1988 Toronto Star and might not exactly match final tallies.

== By-election ==
Ward 8 Councillor Marilyn Churley resigned upon winning a seat in the 1990 Provincial Election. A by-election was held on November 29, 1990:

Peter Tabuns - 3,217
Linda Lynch - 2,421
Carol Mark - 521
Susan Millingen - 195
Donald Andrews - 137
Daniel Browning - 97

== Borough of East York ==
The election in East York was a rather tame affair with the mayor, Dave Johnson handily re-elected by a large plurality. On Council five of eight members were new but only one incumbent, Bob Dale was defeated. Incumbent Steve Mastoras was re-elected but demoted to Junior Councillor in Ward 2.

† - denotes incumbent status from previous council

=== Mayor ===
- †Dave Johnson - 20,234
- Herbert T. McGroarty - 3,531
- Robert Ruminski - 713

=== Councillor ===
Two councillors were elected to each ward.

Ward 1
Case Ootes - 2,903
Michael Prue - 2,413
John Papadakis - 1,101
Melanie Milanich - 868
John Couvell - 398
Michael Grosso - 303
Alex Parucha - 292

Ward 2
†Bill Buckingham - 4,275
†George Vasilopolous - 3,920
Paul Robinson - 3,351

Ward 3
Helen Kennedy - 3,418
†Steve Mastoras - 3,006
†Bob Dale - 2,561
Anastasios Baxevanidis - 609

Ward 4
Lorna Krawchuk - 4,343
Jenner Jean-Marie - 4,016
Steve Gorgey - 2,686
Ghamsh Kara - 1,713

=== Trustee ===
Ward 1 (3 to be elected)
†Gail Nyberg - 2,419
Janet McKeown - 1,781
Dennis Kolby - 1,503
Randy Silar - 1,146
Grace Stephens - 907

Ward 2 (1 to be elected)
†Connie Culbertson - 3,553
†Ken Maxted - 3,069
Alexander Kory - 1,679

Ward 3 (3 to be elected)
Margaret Hazelton - 2,643
Len Self - 1,884
Shirley Boast - 1,205
Russell English - 609

Ward 4 (3 to be elected)
Elca Rennick - 4,128
Ruth Goldhar - 3,978
Henry Friesen - 1,447
Abdul Hal Patel - 954

=== Hydro Commission ===
(2 to be elected)

†Frank E. Johnson - 13,033
John Flowers - 9,801
Georgia Dunn - 8,964
John Nursey - 3,334

== City of Etobicoke ==
=== Mayor ===
- (incumbent)Bruce Sinclair: 45,860
- Terry Howes: 13,081
- Margaret Krell: 6,547
- Robert Goddard Young: 6,269
- Neville Berry: 4,146

=== City Councillors ===
Ward 1

- Irene Jones: 3,404
- (incumbent)Helen Wursta: 1,752
- Frank Falcone: 780
- Harold Merten: 334

Ward 2

- (incumbent)Alex Faulkner: 4,288
- Richard Clupa: 1,484
- James Shawera: 292

Ward 3

- Ross Bissell: 2,747
- Aileen Anderson: 2,055
- Martha MacGray: 1,825
- John Cudahy: 942

Ward 4

- Michael O'Rourke: 2,303
- Jane Scott: 1,312
- Elizabeth Holmes: 1,225
- Chris O'Toole: 1,081
- Al Kolyn: 923
- Geoffrey Grossmith: 815

Ward 5

- Anne Methot: 2,150
- Sperril Chambers: 1,623
- Al Allman: 1,334
- Steven Davis: 1,041
- Ken Lopez: 721
- Gino Marranghi: 373

Ward 6

- Douglas Holyday
- (incumbent)Ron Barr: 1,358
- John Woodroof: 1,314
- Tom Ferguson: 509

Ward 7

- (incumbent)Gloria Luby: 4,209
- Alida Leistra: 3,344

Ward 8

- (incumbent)Mary Huffman: 4,189
- John Alati: 3,841

Ward 9

- (incumbent)Alex Marchetti: 4,473
- Leonard Zaleski: 1,597

Ward 10

- (incumbent)David Robertson (acclaimed)

Ward 11

- (incumbent)Karen Herrell: 2,658
- Raj Chopra: 780

Ward 12

- (incumbent)John Hastings: 1,260
- Ed McWilliams: 998
- Peter Hutchens: 968
- Shan Rana: 617

== City of Scarborough ==
=== Mayor ===
- Joyce Trimmer: 53,566
- Norm Kelly: 48,701
- Owen: 7,951
- O'Malley: 3,137
- Max French: 1,509
- Abel Van Wyk: 939

=== City Councillors ===
Ward 1

- Harvey Barron; 5,077
- Webster; 1,856

Ward 2

- Gerry Altobello; 4,392
- Cayenne; 2,483

Ward 3

- John Wardrope; 4,887
- Duncan; 1,948
- Kazia; 1,017

Ward 4

- Lorenzo Berardinetti; 2,453
- Kurt Christensen; 2,449
- Glynwilliams; 1,936
- Ward; 1,011
- McDowell; 318
- Georges Legault; 292

Ward 5

- Marilyn Mushinski; Acclaimation

Ward 6

- Paul Mushinski; 1,997
- Elliott; 1,514
- Lombardi; 1,288
- Michalopoulo; 1,078
- McPherson; 864
- Cavoto; 544
- Sharma; 524

Ward 7

- Fred Johnson, F; 5,209
- Borisko; 4,259

Ward 8

- Shirley Eidt; 5,487
- Murray; 2,013
- Chadha; 651

Ward 9

- Ron Moeser; 4,655
- John Mackie; 4,539
- Roberts; 1,385
- Cocco; 1,193
- Vaya; 221

Ward 10

- Ron Watson; 3,961
- Mahood, P; 2,828
- Wilson, M; 544
- Cotter; 478

Ward 11

- Sherene Shaw; 2,458
- Lombardi, D; 1,308
- Munro; 1,155
- Edmonds; 1,035
- Jacobs; 907
- Zaidi; 422

Ward 12

- Doug Mahood; 5,759
- Cheung, K; 1,754

Ward 13

- Bas Balkissoon; 2,269
- Pratley; 2,249
- Cheung, J; 1,148
- Clements; 1,003
- Bob Watson; 541
- Wilson, L; 519

Ward 14

- Edith Montgomery; 4,956
- Loughlin, B; 947
- Nafis; 489

=== Public Utilities Commission ===
- Cavanagh; 55,439
- Beatty; 50,044
- Stewart; 39,197
- Olders; 10,530

== City of North York ==
Mel Lastman was re-elected mayor of the North York for the sixth consecutive time. His wife, Marilyn also tried to obtain a council seat but was defeated by former school trustee Bob Bradley. Only one incumbent councillor, Bob Yuill was defeated in Ward 8 by newcomer Joanne Flint. All other councillors were re-elected.

=== Mayor ===
- x-Mel Lastman 98,856
- Mike Foster 13,486
- Douglas Campbell 10,290
- Freddie Jay 1,939

=== Council ===
Ward 1

- x-Mario Sergio 6,365
- Tony Marzilli 2,881
- Fred Craft 859

Ward 2

- Judy Sgro 6,882
- Gerry Iuliano 2,398
- Luigi Cavaleri 926

Ward 3

- x-Peter Li Preti 5,123
- Peter Pallotta 808
- Nella Lanzellotti 759
- Shanta Ramotar 486

Ward 4

- x-Frank Di Giorgio 3,658
- Maria Rizzo 2,933
- Eleanor Rosen 1,084
- Gino Cipollone 239
- Rhea Horwich 226

Ward 5

1988 Toronto municipal election: North York Councillor, Ward Five
Candidate	Votes	%
Anthony Perruzza	5,207	50.65
Frank Crudo	1,967	19.13
Bruno Rea	1,557	15.14
John Butcher	951	9.25
Charles Olito	599	5.83
Total valid votes	10,281	100.00

46 out of 47 polls reporting.

- Frank Crudo was a 26-year-old design and construction company project manager during the 1988 election. He called for a stronger campaign against drugs on North York's streets. When Anthony Perruzza was elected to the Legislative Assembly of Ontario in 1990, Crudo applied to the North York council to be selected as his replacement. He was rejected in favor of Claudio Polsinelli. He later campaigned for Metro Toronto's Black Creek ward in the 1991 municipal election, saying that he was running against the area's "NDP machine". He lost to Maria Augimeri. During the 1993 federal election, Crudo was part of a group of dissident Liberals who supported the candidacy of Peter Li Preti over Art Eggleton, following Eggleton's appointment as the riding's Liberal candidate.
- Bruno Rea holds a Ph.D. in political philosophy from Oxford University. He worked as a policy adviser for the Ontario Ministry of Labour in the 1980s, researching and writing briefs on workers' compensation and employment standards. He was a member of the Liberal Party. In 1987, he wrote an editorial piece for The Globe and Mail newspaper opposing capital punishment. He was twenty-nine years old during the 1988 election, and called for a crackdown on crime and a slower pace of regional development. He was endorsed by the Toronto Star newspaper, and was originally regarded as a serious candidate for election. He was arrested one week prior to the election, after trying to dispose of 161 signs belonging to Anthony Perruzza, his New Democratic Party opponent, on the grounds of York University at 3:30 in the morning. He pleaded guilty to a charge of mischief in February 1989, and was fined. Rea was listed as a senior policy adviser for the Ministry of Labour in 2000.
- John Butcher campaigned for the North York City Council on three occasions. In 1982 and 1985, he lost to Irving Chapley in Ward Seven. He was forty-four years old in 1988, and described himself as a lifelong resident of the ward. He acknowledged that he was not likely to win election.

Ward 6

- x-Milton Berger 6,127
- Anne Lelovic 2,403

Ward 7

- x-Irving W. Chapley 5,267
- Eric Cohen 4,595
- Mark Arshawsky 516

Ward 8

- Joanne Flint 5,376
- Bob Yuill 3,462

Ward 9

- x-Ron Summers 6,532
- Ernie Springolo 3,035

Ward 10

- Don Yuill 3,338
- Cora Urbel 2,579
- Marg Middleton 948
- John Boysen 760
- Peter Bate 704
- Ramon Solevilla 546

Ward 11

- x-Jim McGuffin 6,094
- Freddy Trasmundi 864

Ward 12

- x-Barry Burton 3,868
- John Murphy 2,551
- Ronald Hyslop 856
- Peter Allis 527

Ward 13

- Bob Bradley 4,453
- Marilyn Lastman 3,761
- Harvey Brooker 1,031
- Allan Ginsberg 544

Ward 14

- x-Paul Sutherland acclaimed

=== School Board ===
Ward 1

- Sheila Lambrinos 1,195
- Ted Wray 875
- Wendy Essex 638
- Doug Kvistbo 198

Ward 2

- Bob Churchill 1,463
- Jim Darvill 774
- John Campbell 744
- Lilia Ruffolo 387
- Angelo Castellano 349
- Aurelio Caldarelli 238

Ward 3

- x-Elizabeth Smith 960
- Stephnie Payne 728
- Philomen Wright 570
- Natalie Soobrian 482

Ward 4

- x-Elsa Chandler 3,083
- Bob Daggett 762

Ward 5

- x-Errol Young 2,862
- Leslie Soobrian 736

Ward 6

1988 Toronto municipal election: North York Board of Education, Ward Six
Candidate	Votes	%
Cheryl Moscoe	3,852	52.82
Phyllis Weinberg	3,441	47.18
Total valid votes	7,293	100.00

- Phyllis Weinberg was 56 years old during the campaign, and was described as a psychotherapist and former teacher. She was listed in 1996 as the owner and operator of Orthodox Counselling Services, which offers support on stress management and family issues in the Orthodox Jewish community. She had previously campaigned for the North York Hydro Commission in 1985, finishing sixth out of nine candidates. She was twice asked to stop campaigning on the grounds of a public school in 1988, and was criticized for giving candy to children near school property. Weinberg argued that the complaints against her were part of a "mud-slinging campaign" designed to prevent her from winning the seat. She planned to campaign for the ward six seat again in the 1991 election, but withdrew before election day.

Ward 7

- x-Mae Waese acclaimed

Ward 8

- x-Gerri Gershon 6,205
- Trevor Tymchuk 1,203

Ward 9

- x-Shelley Stillman 5,803
- Rose Yunger 1,756

Ward 10

- x-Darlene Scott 4,997
- Rena Gordon 2,052

Ward 11

- x-John Filion acclaimed

Ward 12

- x-Ken Crowley acclaimed

Ward 13

- x-Dan Hicks 5,235
- Gini Sharma 2,509

Ward 14

- x-Ralph Belfry 4,741
- Dash Shah 1,461

=== Hydro Commission ===
(2 elected)

- x-Carl Anderson 57,280
- Bob Dyer 44,177
- x-Jack Bedder 37,121
- Donald Hubbs 13,183
- Jack Arshawsky 12,506
- Irving Bricks 10,160

== City of York ==
=== Mayor ===
Mario Faraone was a 47-year-old building designer, consultant, and the owner of the firm F.M. Faraone and Sons company. He campaigned in support of urban tax reform, better traffic planning and affordable housing. He was a member of the Liberal Party, but ran without a party endorsement. A 1990 article in the Toronto Star newspaper drew attention to the fact that the York adjustment committee approved every single proposal put forward by Faraone in 1989 through 1990, despite serious concerns from local residents in some instances. One of the committee members was Faraone's business partner, Jack Capitanio. Faraone denied any suggestion of wrongdoing, and argued that his success rate was a reflection of his experience in the building industry. Capitano also denied suggestions of favouritism. Mayor Fergy Brown responded to the article by saying that he would raise the matter at the next council meeting, and recommended the city's legal department start an investigation. Newspaper reports do not indicate how the matter was resolved. Faraone has remained active in the building trade.

1988 Toronto municipal election: Mayor of York
Candidate	Votes	%
Fergy Brown	21,493	58.74
Tony Grande	13,616	37.21
Mario Faraone	1,482	4.05
Total valid votes	36,591	100.00

=== City Council ===
Of the eight ward races, six incumbents were returned. Newcomer Frances Nunziata beat incumbent Gary Bloor in Ward 7. Jim Fera was also a new member for Ward 5.

Ward 1
Ben Nobleman (incumbent) 2,228
Daria Bradbury 1,885

Ward 2
Tony Mandarano (incumbent) 2,558
Chai Kalevar 809
Frank Rogers 592

Ward 3
Tony Rizzo (incumbent) 1,965
Ron Bradd 1,786
Suzana Dozsa 404
Lisa Alliston 298
Dino Coletti 150
Ettore Reda 72
Roland Saggiorato (withdrew)

Ward 4
Nicolo Fortunato (incumbent) 1,421
Joan Roberts 1,179
Salvatore Sinopoli 458
Sydney King 181

Ward 5
Jim Fera 1,890
Enrico M. Iafolla 1,479
Dan Howells 597

Ward 6
Bob McLean (incumbent) 4,277
Rick Richards 1,367

Ward 7
Frances Nunziata 2,969
Gary Bloor (incumbent) 2,252
Gurpreet Malhotra 83

Ward 8
Bill Saundercook (incumbent, acclaimed)

=== Board of trustees ===
Ward 1
Karen Hen (incumbent) 2,162
James Stevens 809

Ward 2*
Branko Jovanovich 833
Pete Karageorgos 826
Marion Ward 561

- Election Night Results - Recount
Ward 2 Post Recount
Branko Jovanovich 828
Pete Karageorgos 827
Marion Ward 561
Due to irregularities by-election ordered by District Court Judge R.G. Conant

Ward 2 By-Election Results - June 19, 1989
Pete Karageorgos 537
Branko Jovanovich 527
Marion Ward 196

Ward 3
Ruth Russell (incumbent) 1,897
Peter Luci 559

Ward 4
Elizabeth Hill 760
Michael Bunker 442
Stefano Scopacasa 363
Charles Ashton 88

Ward 5
Patricia Hainer 1,260
Joseph Morriello 1,051

Ward 6
John Gibson (incumbent) 2,096
Brian Morgan 1,623

Ward 7
Steven Mold (incumbent) 2,551
Jon Gentry 1,005

Ward 8
Madeleine McDowell (incumbent) 1,804
Gaye Lew 1,129
