= 1991 Toronto municipal election =

Canadian city election

1991 Toronto mayoral election
- November 12, 1991
- Turnout: 42.9%
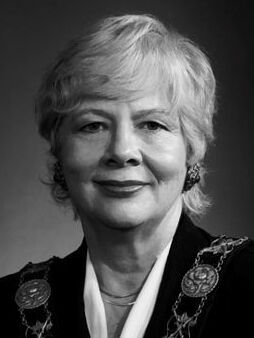

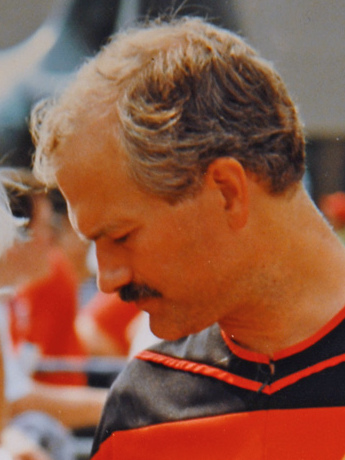
Candidate	June Rowlands	Jack Layton
Party	Independent	New Democratic
Popular vote	113,993	64,044
Percentage	58.5%	32.9%
Mayor before election
Art Eggleton
Elected mayor
June Rowlands

The 1991 Toronto municipal election was held on November 12, 1991, to elect councillors in Metropolitan Toronto, Ontario, Canada, and mayors, councillors and school trustees in Toronto, York, East York, North York, Scarborough and Etobicoke.

Under the 1989 Municipal Act changes, the title of alderman was changed to councillor across Metro.

== Leadership ==
- Metro Toronto Chairman - Alan Tonks
- Mayor of Toronto - June Rowlands
- Mayor of East York - David Johnson (1992–93), Michael Prue (1993-94)
- Mayor of Etobicoke - Bruce Sinclair
- Mayor of North York - Mel Lastman
- Mayor of Scarborough - Joyce Trimmer
- Mayor of York - Fergy Brown

== Metro ==
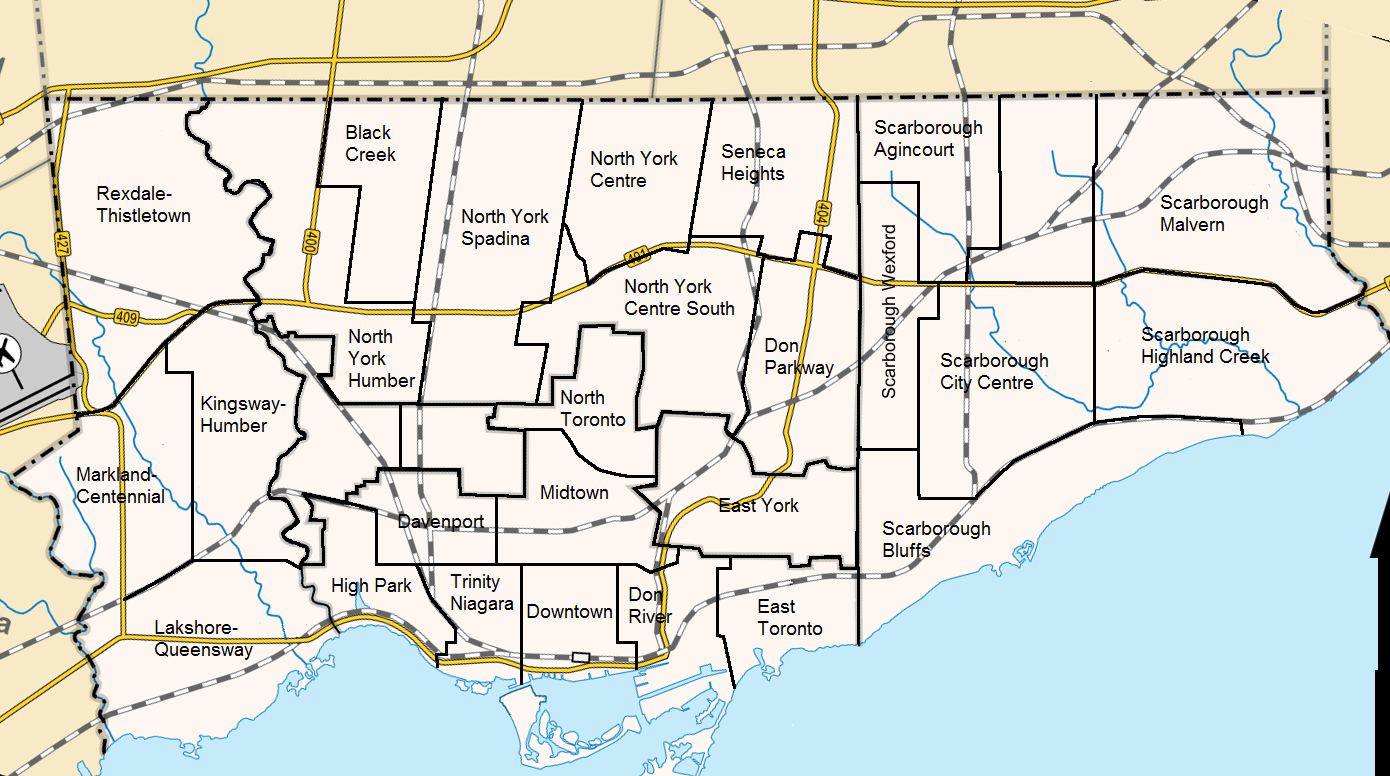
The electoral divisions used for Metro in the 1991 election

Metro council was mostly unchanged from that elected in the 1988 election. The only incumbent defeated was Bob Sanders in Scarborough Malvern, who was ousted by Raymond Cho. New arrivals included school board trustee Olivia Chow elected downtown.

High Park
Derwyn Shea (incumbent) - 13,706
David Miller - 8,079
Yaqoob Khan - 1,544

Trinity Niagara
Joe Pantalone (incumbent) - 9,084
Michael Baillargeon - 3,610
Charlene Cottle - 1,364

Downtown
Olivia Chow - 10,024
Storm MacGregor - 4,913
Michael Lockey - 2,805
Larry Lee - 1,836
Zoltan Fekete - 1,327

Don River
Roger Hollander (incumbent) - 10,868
Paul Raina - 9,220

East Toronto
Paul Christie (incumbent) - acclaimed

Davenport
Dennis Fotinos - 7,452
Anne Ladouceur - 3,695
Peter Zahakos - 3,532
Dale Ritch - 1,697

Midtown
Ila Bossons (incumbent) - 14,776
Victor Knox - 6,996

North Toronto
Anne Johnston (incumbent) - 21,953
Paul Egli - 4,267

East York
Peter Oyler (incumbent) - 9,810
Steve Mastoras - 7,083
Mike Wyatt - 4,372

Lakeshore Queensway
Blake Kinahan (incumbent) - 9,055
Jeff Knoll - 6,624

Markland Centennial
Dick O'Brien (incumbent) - acclaimed

Kingsway Humber
Dennis Flynn (incumbent) - 13,097
Terry Howes - 5,825

Rexdale Thistletown
Lois Griffin (incumbent) - acclaimed

North York Humber
Mario Gentile (incumbent) - acclaimed

Black Creek
Maria Augimeri (incumbent) - 10,801
Frank Crudo - 3,298
Angela Natale

North York Spadina
Howard Moscoe (incumbent) - 11,129
Tibor Martinek - 2,589
Larry Wynne - 1,687

North York Centre South
Bev Salmon (incumbent) - acclaimed

North York Centre
Norman Gardner (incumbent) - 12,119
Jeffrey Smith - 3,028

Don Parkway
Marie Labette (incumbent) - 10,897
Louis Horvath - 3,544

Seneca Heights
Joan King (incumbent) - 11,624
Peter Lowry - 3,245

Scarborough Bluffs
Brian Ashton (incumbent) - 11,398
Frank Duckworth - 3,994

Scarborough Wexford
Maureen Prinsloo (incumbent) - 6,288
Hugh Canning - 4,820

Scarborough Centre
Brian Harrison (incumbent) - acclaimed

Scarborough Highland Creek
Ken Morrish (incumbent) - acclaimed

Scarborough Agincourt
Scott Cavalier (incumbent) - 7,171
Anne C. McBride - 4,236

Scarborough Malvern
Raymond Cho - 5,283
Bob Sanders (incumbent) - 3,977
Shan Rana - 1,321

York Eglinton
Mike Colle (incumbent) - 10,773
John Rocca - 2,223

York Humber
Alan Tonks (incumbent) - acclaimed

North York Humber Councillor Mario Gentile resigned on August 10, 1994, following a conviction for breach of trust. Paul Valenti was appointed to fill the vacancy on August 24.

== Toronto ==
=== Mayor ===
In Toronto, the mayoral race was the first open contest in more than a decade as Mayor Art Eggleton decided not to run for re-election after 11 years. Jack Layton, a long-time city councillor and leader of the council's left wing contested the Mayor's position as the first-ever official candidate of the Metro New Democratic Party (NDP).

The centre-right was initially divided amongst three candidates, former city councillor June Rowlands who had most recently been chair of the police commission, then-city councillor Betty Disero and former alderman, provincial cabinet minister and Red Tory Susan Fish. Fearing that the 1991 election would be a repeat of 1978 where a split on the right allowed left-winger John Sewell to win, the business and development community worked behind the scenes to consolidate its support behind Rowlands. Lacking funds, Disero and Fish were forced to drop out before the close of nominations resulting in a two-way race between Rowlands and Layton with Rowlands proving victorious. Fish's name remained on the ballot, as she withdrew after the deadline for nominations had passed.

Election for Mayor, City of Toronto, 1991 municipal election
Candidate	Total votes	% of total votes
June Rowlands	113,993	58.53
Jack Layton (NDP)	64,044	32.88
Susan Fish	8,123	4.17
Don Andrews	1,968	1.01
Jim Harris	1,760	0.90
Ken Campbell	1,708	0.88
Joe Young	1,196	0.61
William McKeown	1,023	0.53
Ben Kerr	952	0.49
Total valid votes	194,767	100.00

Results taken from the Toronto Star newspaper, 14 November 1991, E8. The final official results were not significantly different.

=== City council ===
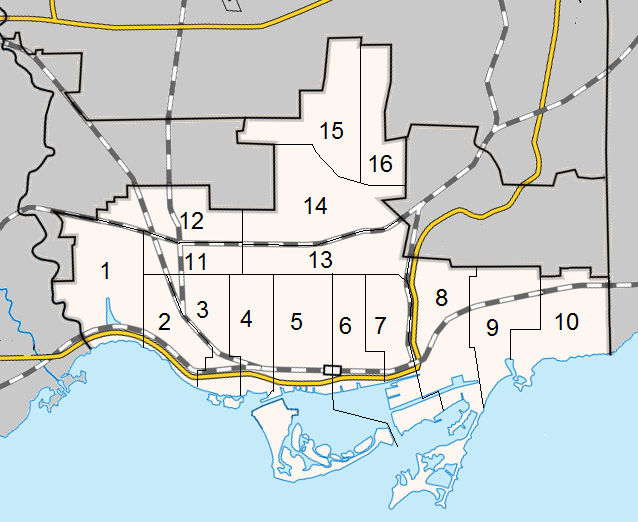
Ward boundaries used in the 1991 election

As with Metro, city council was mostly stable with all incumbents who ran being reelected. The new council had six NDP affiliated members eight members on the right and two moderates who varied between the groups. New members included Kyle Rae, who won Layton's vacated downtown seat, and became the first ever openly gay man to serve on council.

Ward 1 (Swansea and Bloor West Village)
Candidate	Total votes	% of total votes
William Boytchuk (X)	5,662	41.25
David Hutcheon	3,913	28.51
Rosemary Martinuk	2,319	16.90
Bill Roberts	1,830	13.33
Total valid votes	13,724	100.00

- In Ward 1, incumbent Councillor William Boytchuk (who has served as councillor since 1969), had no problem keeping his seat, winning with a 13% margin over David Hutcheon. Hutcheon would later be elected to City Council in 1994 and serve as Budget Chief.

Ward 2 (Parkdale)
Candidate	Total votes	% of total votes
Chris Korwin-Kuczynski (X)	7,005	59.45
Susan Shaw	4,777	40.54
Total valid votes	11,782	100.00

- Councillor Korwin-Kuczynski, who has held the ward since 1982, defeated challenger Susan Shaw by nearly 20% in a head-to-head challenge.

Ward 3 (Brockton)
Candidate	Total votes	% of total votes
Tony O'Donohue (X)	4,348	64.01
Debbie Field	2,312	34.04
Jimmy Talpa	132	1.94
Total valid votes	6,792	100.00

- Serving on Council since 1966, O'Donohue easily won re-election in his ward.

Ward 4 (Trinity-Bellwoods and Little Italy)
Candidate	Total votes	% of total votes
Martin Silva (X)	3,870	47.51
Nick Figliano	2,780	34.13
Ian Christie	1,496	18.36
Total valid votes	8,146	100.00

- Martin Silva has held the ward since winning for the first time in 1988, and won re-election over Nick Figliano and Ian Christie with almost half the vote.

Ward 5 (Financial District, Toronto - University of Toronto)
Candidate	Total votes	% of total votes
Elizabeth Amer (X)	3,718	37.73
Benson Lau	3,304	33.53
Hilary Gait	1,948	19.79
Raymond Poon	884	8.97
Total valid votes	9,854	100.00

- One term councillor Elizabeth Amer won re-election by a narrow margin over Benson Lau.

Ward 6 Downtown East
Candidate	Total votes	% of total votes
Kyle Rae	4,803	38.08
Simon de Groot	3,630	28.78
Peter Maloney	3,410	27.03
Hutch Andersan	771	6.11
Total valid votes	12,614	100.00

- Kyle Rae won the seat vacated by Jack Layton in his attempt to run for mayor, and became the first openly gay City Councillor in Toronto.

Ward 7 (Regent Park and Cabbagetown)
Candidate	Total votes	% of total votes
Barbara Hall (X)	5,853	70.13
Edward Fortune	2,493	29.87
Total valid votes	8,346	100.00

- Barbara Hall (who will later serve as mayor), soundly won her ward with 70% of the vote, in a one-on-one campaign against Edward Fortune.

Ward 8 (Riverdale)
Candidate	Total votes	% of total votes
Peter Tabuns (X)	5,974	46.63
John Roy	5,709	44.56
Michael Green	1,129	8.81
Total valid votes	12,812	100.00

- Future NDP MPP Peter Tabuns won his ward by a razor-thin margin. Tabuns defeated John Roy by just over 200 votes, the narrowest in the election campaign.

Ward 9 (East Danforth)
Candidate	Total votes	% of total votes
Steve Ellis	3,801	36.40
Avril Usha Velupillai	3,437	32.92
Terry Brackett	3,204	30.68
Total valid votes	10,442	100.00

- After the resignation of incumbent councillor Tom Clifford, the seat was won by Steve Ellis in a three-way race over the area's School Trustee Avril Usha Velupillai and Terry Brackett.

Ward 10 (The Beaches)
Candidate	Total votes	% of total votes
Tom Jakobek (X)	10,211	72.43
Shelly Jean O'Neill	3,887	27.57
Total valid votes	14,098	100.00

- Tom Jakobek, who has served as the councillor for the area since 1980, won re-election in an almost 3 to 1 margin over challenger Shelly Jean O'Neill.

Ward 11 (The Junction)
Candidate	Total votes	% of total votes
Rob Maxwell (X)	3,780	51.53
Walter Melnyk	3,090	42.13
Eugene Zimmerebner	485	6.61
Total valid votes	7,355	100.00

- Incumbent Rob Maxwell won by a 700-vote margin over Walter Melnyk.

Ward 12 (Davenport and Corso Italia)
Candidate	Total votes	% of total votes
Betty Disero (X)	6,420	64.73
Nick Marchese	1,902	19.18
Fred Dominelli	1,596	16.09
Total valid votes	9,918	100.00

- After dropping out in her run for mayor, Betty Disero ran for City Council, soundly defeating her challengers with 65% of the vote.

Ward 13 (The Annex and Yorkville)
Candidate	Total votes	% of total votes
John Adams	4,904	38.60
Ying Hope	4,157	32.72
Brian Mayes	3,645	28.69
Total valid votes	12,706	100.00

- John Adams won the ward of Yorkville. Ying Hope also attempted to make a political comeback, after serving as a Toronto alderman in the 1960s and 70s.

Ward 14 (Forest Hill)
Candidate	Total votes	% of total votes
Howard Levine (X)	5,201	42.90
John Gunning	4,015	33.12
Gerry Gordon	2,280	18.81
Anthony Burson	628	5.18
Total valid votes	12,124	100.00

- Incumbent Howard Levine wins the upper-class ward with 43% of the vote, 11% over his next closest challenger John Gunning.

Ward 15 (Western North Toronto)
Candidate	Total votes	% of total votes
Kay Gardner (X)	11,299	76.11
Nancy Griffin	3,546	23.88
Total valid votes	14,845	100.00

- The only ward where all candidates were female, incumbent Kay Gardner defeated her challenger Nancy Griffin with 3 times the vote.

Ward 16 (Davisville and Lawrence Park)
Candidate	Total votes	% of total votes
Michael Walker (X)	9,001	57.47
Malcolm Martini	3,688	23.55
Howard Brown	2,973	18.98
Total valid votes	15,662	100.00

- Michael Walker wins the ward with twice the number of votes as his next closest challenger.

== East York ==
Dave Johnson was re-elected mayor by a wide margin. All the incumbents were re-elected. Ward 2 saw the closest race.

† - denotes incumbent status from previous council

=== Mayor ===
- †Dave Johnson 18,329
- Brenda Louella Kildey 3,977

==== Replacement mayor ====
On April 2, 1993, Johnson was elected to the provincial government in a by-election to replace Margery Ward who died in office. East York council decided to choose a new mayor amongst themselves rather than run a by-election that would have cost an estimated $500,000. Michael Prue won the contest after six rounds of balloting and he became the mayor for the rest of the term. Norm Crone was appointed to fill Prue's place on council.

=== Council ===
Two councillors were elected in each ward.

Ward 1

- †Michael Prue 3,261
- †Case Ootes 3,061
- John Couvell 1,347
- Michael Sokovnin 610

Ward 2

- †George Vasilopoulos 3,469
- David Anderson 3,269
- Paul Robinson 3,098

Ward 3

- Bob Dale 2,377
- John Papadakis 2,052
- John Antonopoulos 1,845
- Ed McConnell 1,357
- Jim Zotalis 487

Ward 4

- †Lorna Krawchuk 5,173
- †Jenner Jean-Marie 4,449
- Darrel Berry 3,050

== Etobicoke ==
=== Mayor ===
- (incumbent)Bruce Sinclair 38,124 (55%)
- Norman Matusiak 31,327 (45%)

Matusiak, a lawyer and former deputy crown attorney with no previous political experience, did unexpectedly well Sinclair would go on to be defeated by Doug Holyday in the 1994 election.

=== Council ===
Ward 1

- (incumbent) Irene Jones 2,664
- Peter Ramos 1,167
- Bon Gullins 1,037

Ward 2

- (incumbent) Alex Faulkner 2,878
- Lynn Harrett 1,428
- Peter Milczyn 1,142

Ward 3

- (incumbent) Ross Bissell 3,325
- Aileen Anderson 1,835
- Mark Palazzese 1,300

Ward 4

- (incumbent) Michael O'Rourke 5,669
- Stephen Boujikian 1,528

Ward 5

- (incumbent) Brian Flynn 2,563
- Anne Methot 1,747
- Susan Sotnick 1,524
- Ron Barr 877
- Abu Alam 137

Ward 6

- (incumbent) Doug Holyday (acclaimed)

Ward 7

- (incumbent) Gloria Luby 4,245
- John Woodroof 3,069

Ward 8

- (incumbent) Mary Huffman 4,718
- Raymond Morand 2,284

Ward 9

- (incumbent) Alex Marchelli 3,187
- Peter Kell 1,791

Ward 10

- (incumbent) Brian Ineson 2,474
- David Robertson 2,229
- Frank Acri 935
- Brian Logie 151

Ward 11

- (incumbent) Elizabeth Brown 1,333
- Karen Herrell 1,079
- Charlie Gordon 872
- Darshan Singh 204

Ward 12

- (incumbent) John Hastings 2,351
- Ron Strong 571
- Anil Banerjee 436

== North York ==
Mel Lastman was re-elected mayor of the North York for the seventh consecutive time which broke a record set 710 years ago in the 13th century. Only one incumbent councillor, Bob Bradley was defeated in Ward 13 by newcomer David Shiner. Two other newcomers joined him, John Filion and Maria Rizzo who replaced retiring councillors. All other councillors were re-elected.

=== Mayor ===
- (incumbent)Mel Lastman 91,449
- David K. Long 17,321

=== Council ===
Ward 1

- Mario Sergio 6,699
- Fred Craft 1,492

Ward 2

- Judy Sgro acclaimed

Ward 3

- Peter Li Preti 4,949
- Kathleen Walsh 1,174
- Lennox Farrell 1,072

Ward 4

- Frank Di Giorgio 5,150
- Marco DeVuono 1,484

Ward 5

- Mario Rizzo 5,908
- Linda Memmo 3,499
- Craig Deasley 832

Ward 6

- Milton Berger acclaimed

Ward 7

- Irving W. Chapley 4,867
- Shalom Schachter 2,649
- Michael Klein 518
- Sonnee Cohen 466
- Jessie Silver 354
- Mark Arshawsky 306
- Lothar Hille 124

Ward 8

- Joanne Flint acclaimed

Ward 9

- Ron Summers 5,346
- Freddy Trasmundi 3,341

Ward 10

- Don Yuill 3,770
- Anne Lelovic 3,193
- Tony West 683
- Rod Gerrard 457

Ward 11

- John Filion 4,553
- Mary Matrundola 2,680
- Jack Arshawsky 289

Ward 12

- Barry Burton 4,212
- Frank DiTomasso 2,418

Ward 13

- David Shiner 5,017
- Bob Bradley 3,591

Ward 14

- Paul Sutherland 5,470
- Gerry Scanlan 1,355

=== North York School Board ===
Ward 1 Emery

- Sheila Lambrinos (NDP)

Ward 2 Amesbury Park/Black Creek

- Bob Churchill

Ward 3 Jane/Finch

- Stephnie Payne (NDP)

Ward 4 Lawrence Heights

- Elsa Chandler

Ward 5 Downsview

- Errol Young

Ward 6 Avenue Rd.

1991 Toronto municipal election: North York Board of Education, Ward Six
Candidate	Votes	%
David Young	4,222	63.15
(x)Cheryl Moscoe	2,464	36.85
Total valid votes	6,686	100.00

Results taken from the Toronto Star, 13 November 1991 (all polls reporting). The final official results were not significantly different.

Ward 7 Wilson Heights

- Mae Waese

Ward 8 Banbury-Windfields-St. Andrew's

- Gerri Gershon

Ward 9 Senlac

- Shelley Stillman

Ward 10 Don Mills-Flemingdon

- Darlene Scott

Ward 11 Willowdale

- Diane Meaghan

Ward 12 Victoria Village-Broadlands-Fenside

- Kim Scott Liberal

Ward 13 Hillcrest

- Dan Hicks

Ward 14 Oriole/Fairview/Pleasant View

- David Caplan Liberal

== Scarborough ==
=== Mayor ===
- (incumbent)Joyce Trimmer 67,458
- John O'Malley 11,728
- Max French 3,784
- Abel Van Wyk 2,758

=== City Councillors ===
Ward 1

- Harvey Barron (acclaimed)

Ward 2

- (incumbent)Gerry Altobello 3,690
- Danny Lovatsis 1,734

Ward 3

- (incumbent) Mike Tzekas 2,357
- John Wardrope 2,192
- George Page 1,051
- Tom Furr 921
- Rocco Zambri 222

Ward 4

- (incumbent)Lorenzo Berardinetti 3,762
- Kurt Christensen 2,104
- Costas Manios 1,367
- Ruth A. Lunel 357

Ward 5

- (incumbent)Marilyn Mushinski 2,783
- Paul Crawford 1,115
- George Walsh 1,040
- Steve Tonner 377

Ward 6

- (incumbent)Paul Mushinski 2,878
- Barry Christensen 1,603
- Tom Rowland 1,603
- Chris Kalpakis 512
- Chester Searles 426
- John Beatt 205
- Shawn Bredin 202

Ward 7

- Fred Johnson (acclaimed)

Ward 8

- (incumbent)Frank Faubert 3,952
- David Soknacki 1,532
- Steve Ryan 1,075
- Michael Fiddes 119

Ward 9

- (incumbent)Ron Moeser 7,391
- Joseph Pileggi 2,055

Ward 10

- (incumbent)Ron Watson 4,345
- Herb Cotter 1,219

Ward 11

- (incumbent)Sherene Shaw 3,552
- Don Lombardi 1,457
- Christopher Fermanis 1,230
- Ayoub Ali 361

Ward 12

- (incumbent)Doug Mahood 4,511
- Bill Kan S. Choung 760
- Norair Yeretsian 629
- Norman Chan 303

Ward 13

- (incumbent)Bas Balkissoon 4,191
- Herbert P. Valle 1,469

Ward 14

- Edith Montgomery acclaimed

== York ==
The race for York council was the most volatile of all the Toronto votes. During the previous term, a development scandal occurred where at least two councillors were convicted of taking bribes from a developer to sell parkland for a condominium development. In all, six of eight incumbents were defeated. Only Fergy Brown as mayor and councillors Frances Nunziata and Bill Saundercook were re-elected. Nunziata was instrumental in exposing the scandal.

=== Mayor ===
- †Fergy Brown 18,702
- Phil White 12,776

=== Council ===
Ward 1

- Roz Mendelsohn 1,627
- †Ben Nobleman 1,254
- Marguerite Kaszecki-Pyron 938
- Kevin Fulbrook 429

Ward 2

- Joe Mihevc 929
- Branko Jovanovich 631
- Helen Poulopoulos 590
- †Tony Mandarano 571
- Joe Fazio 509
- Chaltanya Kalevar 497
- Claudio C. Lewis 54

Ward 3

- Rob Davis 859
- Angela Bianci 625
- Theo Evdoxiadis 475
- Mario Giansante 422
- Roland Saggiorato 402
- Gabriel Graziano 290
- Jose Perez 209
- Suzana Dozsa 178
- Leroy Crosse 152
- Tony Pizzolato 101

Ward 4

- Joan Roberts 1,149
- †Nicolo Fortunato 666
- Patrick Canavan 524
- Joe Piccininno 317

Ward 5

- Barry Rowland 941
- Lynda Palmer 917
- Mary Pedretti 710
- Enrico Iafolla 667
- †Jim Fera 466

Ward 6

- Michael McDonald 2,259
- †Bob McLean 1,417
- Bernard Thompson 1,375

Ward 7

- †Frances Nunziata 3,546
- Pat Rocca 834
- Harold Jinkinson 348

Ward 8

- †Bill Saundercook 2,506
- Ben Orszulak 1,227
- Fran Ferguson 593

† Incumbent

=== School Board ===
Ward 1

- Karen Hen

Ward 2

- Pete Karageorgos (acclamation)

Ward 3

- John Mills

Ward 4

- Elizabeth Hill

Ward 5

- Joe Morriello

Ward 6

- Bonnie Taylor

Ward 7

- Steven Mould

Ward 8

- Madeline McDowell
