= 1985 Toronto municipal election =

1985 Toronto mayoral election
- November 12, 1985
- Turnout: 36.6%
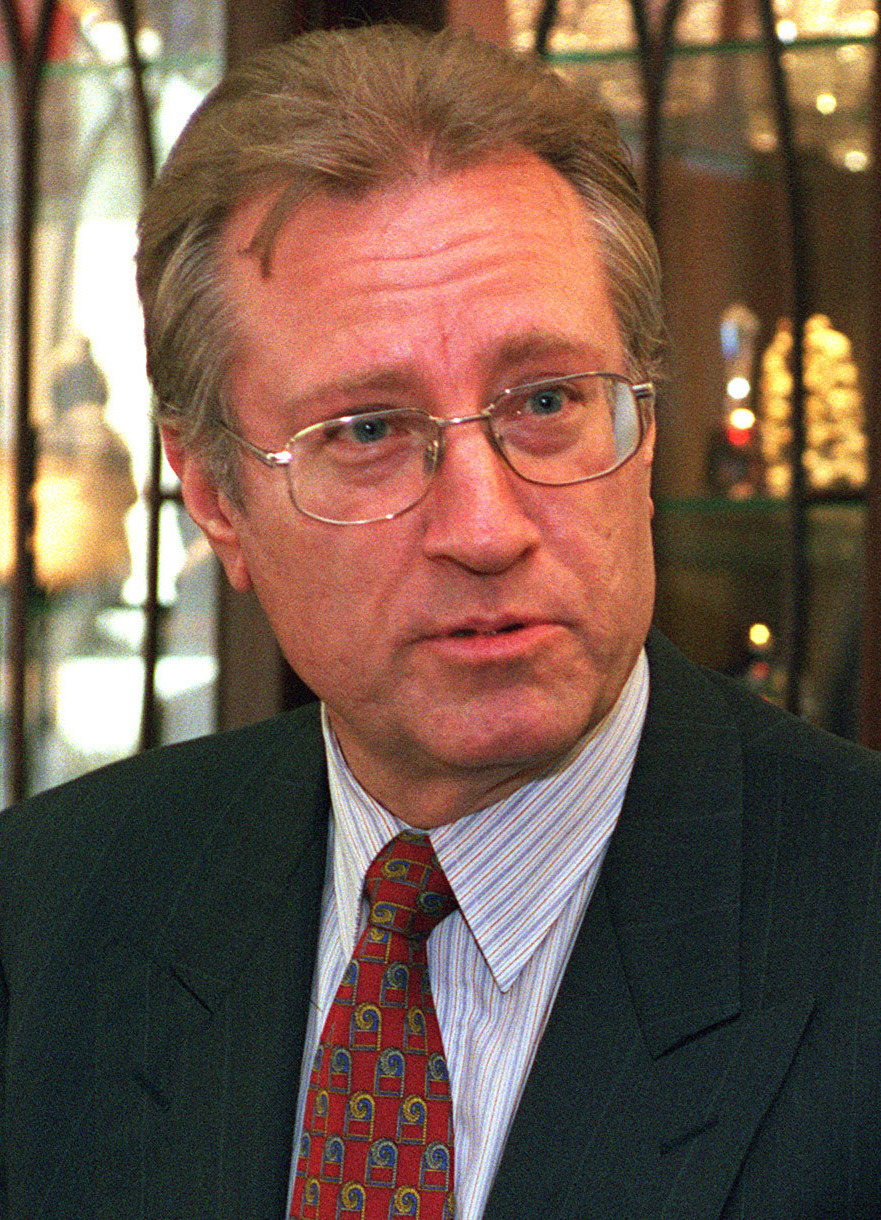
		AJ
Candidate	Art Eggleton	Anne Johnston
Popular vote	92,994	59,817
Percentage	58.1%	37.4%
Mayor of Toronto before election
Art Eggleton
Elected Mayor of Toronto
Art Eggleton

The 1985 Toronto municipal election was held to elect members of municipal councils, school boards, and hydro commissions in the six municipalities that made up Metropolitan Toronto, Ontario, Canada. The election was held on November 12, 1985.

== Toronto ==
=== Mayor ===
The mayoral election saw progressive North Toronto councillor Anne Johnston challenge incumbent Art Eggleton. Eggleton won reelection by a significant margin, with Johnston not even winning her former ward.

Results
Art Eggleton - 92,994
Anne Johnston - 59,817
Ann Ladas - 1,473
Gaston Schwab - 1,228
Aaron Abraham - 1,077
John J. Benz - 583
Skip Evans - 557
Fred Dunn - 513
Gary Watson - 433
Ben Kerr - 422
Ronald Rodgers - 341
Andrejs Murnieks - 266
Warren J. Van Evera - 223
Gary Weagle - 202

=== City and Metro council ===
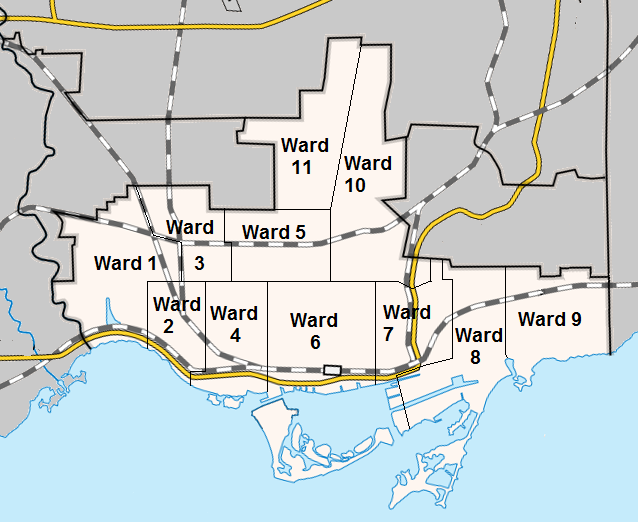
Ward boundaries used in the 1985 election

The election system was changed in Toronto for the 1985 election. Previously two councillors had been elected from each ward, with the one who received the most votes also getting a spot on Metro Toronto council in addition to their city council seat. Under the new system, one person would be directly elected as a Metro councillor while the other would be elected as a city alderman. Although the Metro councillor would still sit on the city council, the change was accompanied with other structural changes to boost the power of the city aldermen, who had often seen their power and authority diminished by the perception that they were "junior" to the Metro councillors.

Most pairs of incumbent councillors reached tacit agreements with one running for city council and the other for Metro. The one battle between two incumbents was in Ward 5 where in a surprise upset junior councillor Ron Kanter defeated the long serving Ying Hope. Two other long serving councillors were defeated. Joe Piccininni who had represented the Corso d'Italia for 25 years lost to 28-year-old Betty Disero. In the east end NDPers Dorothy Thomas lost in a surprise upset to conservative Paul Christie.

Ward 1 (Swansea and Bloor West Village)
Metro
Derwyn Shea (incumbent) - 10,429
Diana Fancher - 2,675
Robert Szajkowski - 1,270

City
William Boytchuk (incumbent) - 8,491
David White - 6,049
Len Bugeja - 1,030

Ward 2 (Parkdale and Brockton)
Metro
Ben Grys (incumbent) - 7,189
Susan Shaw - 4,223

City
Chris Korwin-Kuczynski (incumbent) - 8,617
Owen Leach - 1,638
Hubert P. Antoic - 777
Jimmy Talpa - 353

Ward 3 (Davenport and Corso Italia)
Metro
Richard Gilbert (incumbent) - 6,745
John Martin - 2,722

City
Betty Disero - 5,096
Joseph Piccininni (incumbent) - 3,835
Judy De Sousa - 1,871
Nick Attarano - 282

Ward 4 (Trinity-Bellwoods and Little Italy)
Metro
Joe Pantalone (incumbent) - 6,519
Joe Pimentel - 2,429
Antonio Nunziata - 666
Hiwon Pak - 336

City
Tony O'Donohue (incumbent) - 5,617
David English - 2,755
Vince Nigro - 2,637

Ward 5 (The Annex and Yorkville)
Metro
Ron Kanter (incumbent) - 9,788
Ying Hope (incumbent) - 5,849

City
Nadine Nowlan - 7,018
David Scott - 4,387
Lawson Oates - 2,509

Ward 6 (Financial District, Toronto - University of Toronto)
Metro
Jack Layton (incumbent) - 9,037
Pearl Loo - 1,972
Edward Jackson - 1,824
Lex Dunkelman - 1,183
Citizen Amber - 414

City
Dale Martin (incumbent) - 6,791
Peter Maloney - 4,923
Jerry Borins - 1,902
Steve BFG Johnson - 1,059

Ward 7 (Regent Park and Riverdale)
Metro
Joanne Campbell (incumbent) - 9,293
James P. Atkins - 1,490
Jack McLeavey - 775

City
Barbara Hall - 6,379
Bill Mole - 2,807
Mike Armstrong - 2,232
Christopher Goulios - 613

Ward 8 (Riverdale)
Metro
Fred Beavis (incumbent) - 7,637
Richard Tyssen - 3,604
Sam Baichoo - 494

City
Thomas Clifford (incumbent) - 7,068
Sheila Cram - 4,035
Michael Tegtmeyer - 339

Ward 9 (The Beaches)
Metro
Tom Jakobek (incumbent) - 12,827
Patterson Higgins - 2,775
Jeremy Agar - 747

City
Paul Christie - 8,985
Dorothy Thomas (incumbent) - 7,042

Ward 10 (Rosedale and North Toronto)
Metro
June Rowlands (incumbent) - acclaimed

City
Michael Walker (incumbent) - acclaimed

Ward 11 (Forest Hill and North Toronto)
Metro
Kay Gardner - 8,369
Belinda Morin - 7,905
March Tigh - 2,614

City
Michael Gee (incumbent) - 15,345
Christopher Nelson - 2,810

Results are taken from the November 13, 1985 Toronto Star and might not exactly match final tallies.

=== Changes ===
Ward 7 Metro Councillor Joanne Campbell resigned on September 8, 1987 to accept an appointment to chair the provincial Social Assistance Review Board. Ward 5 Metro Councillor Ron Kanter also resigned when he won a seat in the 1987 Provincial Election. By-elections were held in both wards on October 29, 1987.

Ward 5 Metro
Ying Hope - 3,506
Meg Griffiths - 2,948
Ila Bossons - 1,390
Ben Kerr - 91

Ward 7 Metro
Roger Hollander - 3,701
Jeff Evenson - 3,479
Bill Mole - 392
Christina Fenluk - 256
Ian McIntyre - 220
Geoff Pimbett - 189
Don Andrews - 104
Martin Amber - 46
Trudy Remmes - 21

Ward 10 Metro Councillor June Rowlands resigned April 6, 1988 upon appointment as Chairman of the Metropolitan Toronto Police Commission; on April 18 Alexandra McCallum was appointed as replacement.

== East York ==
Mayor Johnson commented that the election campaign was the quietest, least active he had ever run. He won handily, even though he spent several days in hospital with back pains. On Council, the incumbents in wards one and four were re-elected. Ward two elected newcomers Bill Buckingham and George Vasilopolous while ward three elected Bob Dale and Steve Mastoras.

† - denotes incumbent status from previous council

=== Mayor ===
- †Dave Johnson - 17,996
- Michael Wyatt - 3,070
- David Quirk - 1,041

=== Councillor ===
Two councillors were elected to each ward.

Ward 1

- †Cy Reader - 3,312
- †Bob Willis - 3,035
- Marg Pilger - 1,511

Ward 2

- Bill Buckingham - 3,155
- George Vasilopolous - 2,718
- Alan Cobb - 2,569
- Michael Prue - 2,187

Ward 3

- Bob Dale - 2,380
- Steve Mastoras - 1,403
- Carol Deschamps - 1,280
- Susan Kopsas - 1,015
- Les White - 726
- Ian Gray - 502
- John Papadakis - 426
- Eric Padmore - 286

Ward 4

- †Peter Oyler - 4,419
- †J. Edna Beange - 3,127
- Jenner Jean-Marie - 3,066
- Jeff Wyatt - 1,085

=== Trustee ===
Ward 1 (2 to be elected)

- Ruth Goldhar - 2,596
- Gail Nyberg - 2,333
- Dennis Colby - 1,727

Ward 2 (2 to be elected)

- Connie Culbertson - Acclaimed
- Ken Maxted - Acclaimed

Ward 3 (2 to be elected)

- Margaret Hazelton - 2,241
- Len Self - 1,898
- Lynda Bolognini - 1,576

Ward 4 (3 to be elected)

- Robert J. Murray - 3,277
- Elca Rennick - 3,266
- Margaret Millar - 2,582

=== Hydro Commission ===
(2 to be elected)

- Stan Wadlow - 12,667
- Frank Johnson - 10,732
- April Medland - 6,023

== Etobicoke ==
=== Mayor ===
- (incumbent)Bruce Sinclair - 40,739
- Winfield (Bill) Stockwell - 23,060
- Terry Howes - 1,724
- Dave Gavel - 1,714
- Roland Ollivier - 1,003

Sinclair was appointed mayor in August 1984 to replace Dennis Flynn when he was elected Metro Chairman.

=== Board of Control ===
Candidate	Votes
Dick O'Brien (incumbent)	34,248
Lois Griffin	33,175
Leonard Braithwaite (incumbent)	33,085
Morley Kells	29,817
Chris Stockwell (incumbent)	29,629
Doug Holyday	28,982
James Shawera	5,473
Total	6,982

On September 4, 1984, Etobicoke City Council appointed Controller Bruce Sinclair to replace Flynn as mayor and appointed Lois Griffin to fill the Controller position vacated by Sinclair.

== North York ==
Mel Lastman was re-elected mayor of the City and served until 1997. Maria Augimeri was elected to Ward 5, Peter Li Preti was elected to Ward 3 and Mario Gentile was re-elected as Ward 2 councillor. Esther Shiner was re-elected to Board of Control, but died in office in 1987. Norm Gardner lost his seat on the Board of Control.

=== Mayor ===
- x-Mel Lastman 86,925
- Barbara Greene 29,240
- Nick Iamonaco 5,286

=== Board of Control ===
1985 Toronto municipal election: North York Board of Control (four members elected)
Candidate	Votes	%
(x)Esther Shiner	67,345	19.47
(x)Robert Yuill	53,709	15.53
Norman Gardner	51,137	14.78
Howard Moscoe	42,303	12.23
Mike Foster	35,838	10.36
Frank Esposito	21,365	6.18
Bruce Davidson	18,926	5.47
Sonnee Cohen	12,822	3.71
Bernadette Michael	12,764	3.69
Angelo Natale	12,416	3.59
Cora Urbel	7,791	2.25
Arthur Zins	4,961	1.43
Ayube Ally	4,571	1.32
Total valid votes	345,948	100.00

- Cora Urbel (born Cora Kevany) was a well-known community activist in North York, serving as leader of the North York Concerned Citizens Committee in 1984. She called for an investigation into the approval of the city's Rampart Development Project, and criticized road reforms that she believed would cause increased traffic in residential areas. She was endorsed by John Sewell in 1985 as one of North York's most prominent reformers, and was expected to be a strong candidate. Her poor showing was a surprise to most observers. Urbel served as president of the Don Mills Residents' Association after the election, and promoted "open space" community development. She campaigned for North York City Council's tenth ward in 1988, and lost to Don Yuill in a fairly close contest. She was fifty-nine years old during this campaign, and strongly opposed the extension of Leslie St. past Eglinton Avenue and the decision to widen Don Mills Rd. and Victoria Park Ave. Urbel supported a series of austerity measures in the early 1990s. She called for education spending cuts in 1991, and spoke against a proposed 1% Metro Toronto tax hike in 1994. She died on March 28, 1999. A road in Toronto was named after her the following year.
- Arthur Zins was a self-employed businessman and former public utility administrator, who argued that North York needed his public administration skills. He campaigned for a position on the North York Hydro Board in 1980, and finished last in a field of nineteen candidates.
- Ayube Ally owned a manufacturing plant, and recommended improved facilities for senior citizens.

=== City Council ===
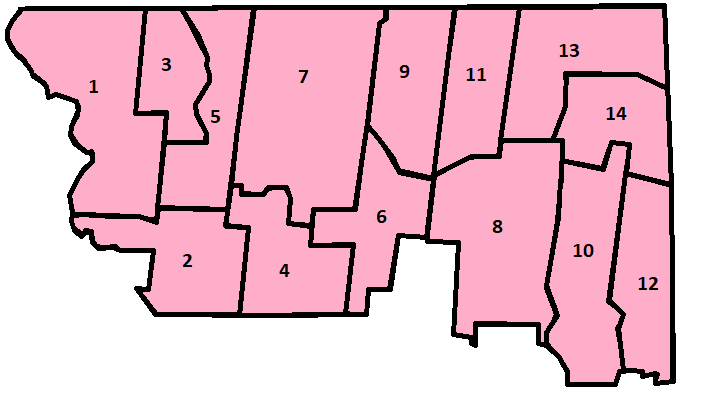
Map of North York's wards used in this election

Ward 1

- x-Mario Sergio acclaimed

Ward 2

- Mario Gentile acclaimed

Ward 3

- x-Peter Li Preti 5,123
- Ben Bellantone 2,391
- Stanley White 608
- Stan Samuel 503
- Sally Ann Kernan 448
- Harry Dhir 330

Ward 4

- x-Frank Di Giorgio 2,293
- Barb Shiner 2,070
- Maria Rizzo 1,924
- Rob Rosenthal 663
- Courtney Doldron 282
- Joel Goldfarb 118

Ward 5

- Maria Augimeri 3.033
- Don Yuill 2,340
- Norm Kelly 1,529
- Joseph Gambano 1,481
- Carlo Pascazi 647
- Stanley Gordon 357

Ward 6

- x-Milton Berger 5,529
- Erwin Rosenberg 2,033

Ward 7

- x-Irving W. Chapley 5,409
- Eric Cohen 3,349
- John Butcher 541

Ward 8

- Bev Salmon 4,918
- Andy Borins 2,845
- Betty Reid 956

Ward 9

- x-Ron Summers 6,663
- Bob Hebdon 2,708
- Paul Iafrate 633

Ward 10

- Marie Labatte 5,185
- Peter Weed 2,399

Ward 11

- x-Jim McGuffin 5,974
- Jason Pearson 1,376
- Peter Clarke 668
- Philip Hohl 393

Ward 12

- x-Barry Burton 3,788
- Colin Williams 1,825
- Richard Kirkup 1,238
- Peter Nastagamou 331

Ward 13

- Joan King 5,290
- Allan Ginsberg 1,323
- Brian Patterson 1,211
- Jeff Smith 563

Ward 14

- Paul Sutherland 3,987
- Jack Hauseman 3,137
- Elwood Helmkay 480

=== Hydro Commission ===
(2 elected)

- x-Carl Anderson 30,678
- Jack Bedder 23,414
- Bob Dyer 21,866
- Michael Armstrong 20,062
- Dino D'Amico 17,590
- Phyllis Weinberg 16,165
- Mary Hicks 12,554
- Alan Moses 9,660
- Howard Fletcher 8,261

=== School Board Trustees ===
- Ward 8 Gerri Gershon
- Ward 9 Shelley Stillman
- Ward 10 Rene Gordon
- Ward 12 Kenneth Crowley

== Scarborough ==
=== Mayor ===
- (incumbent)Gus Harris: 36,216
- Norm Kelly: 24,724
- Brian Harrison: 23,981
- Dekort: 9,228
- Anne C. McBride: 1,911
- Bordonaro: 1,836
- Abel Van Wyk: 382

=== Board of Control (4 elected) ===
- Ken Morrish; 55,636
- (incumbent)Joyce Trimmer; 53,844
- (incumbent)Frank Faubert; 47,724
- Bill Belfontaine; 39,657
- Borisko; 35,495
- Brown; 16,956
- Cotter; 8,617
- Kazia; 4,993

=== Public Utilities ===
- Cavanagh; 45,921
- Beatty; 33,268
- Stewart; 27,686
- Speares; 10,960
- Nurse; 9,445
- Alix; 6,827

=== City Councillors ===
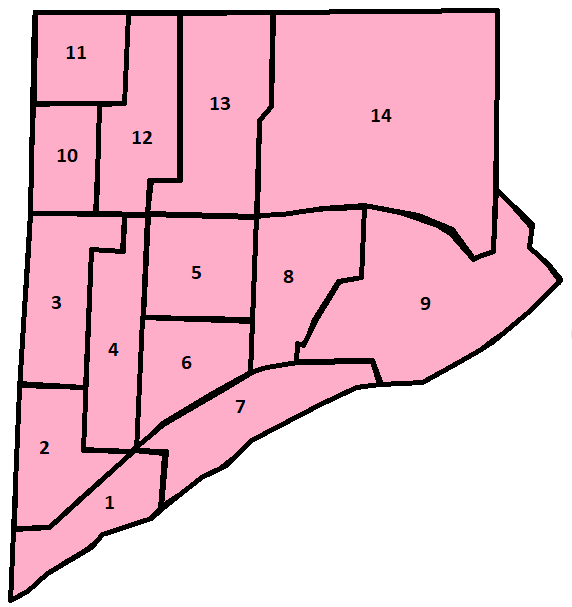
Scarborough's wards used in this election

Ward 1 -

- Harvey Barron; 3,100
- Dan Danielson; NDP; 1,985
- White; 1,761

Ward 2 -

- Gerry Altobello; 2,304
- Boyle; 1,662
- May McKenzie; 1,375
- Judd; 574
- Morton; 476

Ward 3 -

- John Wardrope; 3,034
- Dave Robertson; 2,256
- McDermott; 776
- Catre; 769
- Zaidi; 635

Ward 4 -

- Kurt Christensen; 4,195
- Carole Ligold; 2,362

Ward 5

- Marilyn Mushinski; 4,662
- Knight; 1,285

Ward 6

- Florence Cruickshank; acclamation

Ward 7

- Brian Ashton; 6,230
- Lyall; 1,411

Ward 8

- Shirley Eidt; 4,804
- Murray; 1,912
- Chadha; 717

Ward 9

- John Mackie; 6,134
- DeSouza; 2,218

Ward 10

- Maureen Prinsloo; 4,045
- Edmonds; 1,997

Ward 11

- Scott Cavalier; 3,828
- Anderson; 1,398

Ward 12;

- Doug Mahood; 2,232
- Watson, Ron; 1,350
- Dave Pearce; 1,171
- Lam, A; 898
- Bob Watson; 793
- Manning; 433

Ward 13

- Bob Sanders; 1,858
- Nutter; 1,394
- Kenton; 773
- Chana; 767
- Chicky Chappell; 462
- Coyle; 340

Ward 14

- Edith Montgomery; 3,076
- McLennon; 621
- Sharma; 481
- Loughlin, B; 386
- Russell; 338
- Kukade; 158

== York ==
In York, Alan Tonks was easily re-elected. Michael Colle who was alderman for ward 2 in the previous term tried unsuccessfully to obtain a seat on the Board of Control. New councillors Tony Mandarano in Ward 2 and Bob McLean in Ward 6 won their races. Bill Saundercook was the only winner to unseat a running incumbent in Ward 8.

=== Mayor ===
(incumbent)Alan Tonks
Guy D'Onofrio

=== Board of Control (2 elected) ===
(incumbent)Fergy Brown
(incumbent)Philip White
Michael Colle

=== Council ===
Ward 1
Bill Nobleman (Acclaimed)

Ward 2
Tony Mandarano
Maria de Pasquale

Ward 3
Tony Rizzo (incumbent) won by 570 votes
Ron Bradd

Ward 4
Nicolo Fortunato (incumbent) won by 220 votes
Patrick Canavan

Ward 5
Chris Tonks (incumbent)
Jim Fera

Ward 6
Bob McLean won by 712 votes
Lindsay Cott

Ward 7
Gary Bloor (incumbent) won by 287 votes
Richard Taverner

Ward 8
Bill Saundercook 2,317
Michael Waclawski (incumbent) 2,082

=== School Board Trustees ===
School Board Ward 1

- K. Hen (Acclamation)

School Board Ward 2

- P. Karageorgos

School Board Ward 3

- R. Russell

School Board Ward 4

- N D'urzo

School Board Ward 5

- P Hainer

School Board Ward 6

- J Gribben

School Board Ward 7

- S. Mould

School Board Ward 8

- M McDowell

== Metro Toronto Separate School Trustees ==
1985 Toronto municipal election: Metro Toronto Separate School Board, Ward Fifteen
Candidate	Votes	%
Anthony Perruzza	1,999	33.80
(x)Tony Nigro	1,940	32.80
Ralph Paonessa	1,130	19.10
A. Renato Lavalle	846	14.30
Total valid votes	5,915	100.00

- Antonio (Tony) Nigro served on the Metro Toronto Separate School Board from 1974 to 1985. He was himself a teacher with the North York Board of Education. He tried to return to the Toronto Catholic School Board in the 2000 Toronto municipal election, but was unsuccessful.
- Ralph Paonessa was a first time candidate. He ran for Ward 15 again in 1988, and finished a closer second against Rick Morelli. A 1988 newspaper article indicates that he fifty-two years old, and was co-pastor of St. Francis of Assisi Catholic Church. He wanted students to receive "a truly Catholic education". Paonessa is now Friar at Saint Lawrence the Martyr Friary in Scarborough, and is active with the National Congress of Italian Canadians.
- A. Renato Lavalle was a forty-three-year-old school principal, who sought to maintain the religious orientation of the Catholic school system.
