= Dale Martin (Canadian politician) =

Toronto City Councillor for Ward 6
- In office April 9, 1984 – November 14, 1988 Serving with Jack Layton (1984-1985)
- Preceded by: John Sewell
- Succeeded by: Jack Layton

Metro Toronto Councillor for Ward 6
- In office November 14, 1988 – November 12, 1991
- Preceded by: Jack Layton
- Succeeded by: Olivia Chow

Personal details
- Born: Toronto, Ontario, Canada
- Party: Metro New Democratic Party

Dale Martin is a former Canadian politician, who served on Toronto City Council from 1984 to 1988 and Metro Toronto Council from 1988 to 1991.

== Background ==
Martin grew up in Winnipeg, Manitoba, the son of a railway worker.

== City council ==
Previously the president of the Federation of Metro Tenants Associations, he was endorsed as the Metro New Democratic Party candidate in a 1984 by-election to city council following the resignation of John Sewell in Ward 6. He won the by-election on April 9. Although Sewell, as the ward's senior alderman, had also been its representative on Metro Toronto Council, his resignation made Jack Layton the senior alderman, with Martin serving as the junior alderman.

One of his first significant acts as a councillor was to speak out against the proposed extension of Leslie Street south from Eglinton Avenue to Bayview Avenue, as it would have disrupted residential neighbourhoods in the Thorncliffe Park area in defiance of the city's official plan. He was also an opponent of the early proposals for the SkyDome, on the grounds that it would have displaced land that the city had already earmarked for new housing units.

In November 1984, the city was embroiled in a controversy around a condominium development proposal, which would have seen three apartment buildings on Eglinton Avenue demolished, while the city was blocking the developer's application because it represented a significant loss to the city's supply of affordable housing. Although the developer sought and won an Ontario Superior Court decision ordering the city to issue the demolition permits, Martin was one of 11 councillors, alongside Layton, Richard Gilbert, Joe Pantalone, David Reville, Dorothy Thomas, June Rowlands, Anne Johnston, Ron Kanter and Chris Korwin-Kuczynski, who walked out of council chambers to prevent the meeting from attaining quorum.

In 1985 Martin and Thomas made national headlines in 1985 when, while attending a Federation of Canadian Municipalities conference in Calgary, they got into a war of words with Calgary mayor Ralph Klein about how ugly and poorly planned they perceived the city to be; Thomas was also quoted as calling Calgary City Hall an "abomination". Both Thomas and Martin later apologized for the comments.

He was reelected to a full term in the 1985 Toronto municipal election. This election marked the first time that, instead of a division between "senior" and "junior" aldermen sharing the ward with the senior alderman also serving as Metro councillor, the voters directly elected both a city councillor and a Metro councillor; Layton was re-elected alongside Martin as the Metro councillor.

In this term, he opposed plans that would have overdeveloped the city's Harbourfront at the expense of public space. He regularly stated that he was not opposed in principle to development, but simply wanted to ensure that it was done in a balanced way that addressed the social and cultural needs of the city, and earned a reputation in this era as a pragmatic consensus-builder who was willing to seek out common ground with ideological opponents to achieve his political goals. He was also an opponent of Network 2011, a Toronto Transit Commission expansion plan which he labelled as tilted too strongly toward the benefit of developers rather than the community.

In 1988, Layton and Martin opposed mayor Art Eggleton's proposal to turn Yonge Street and Bay Street into one-way streets through the downtown core.

== Metro council ==
In the 1988 Toronto municipal election, Martin had been briefly speculated as a potential candidate for Mayor of Toronto against Eggleton, but did not run. Instead Layton and Martin traded spots, with Layton running for the city council seat and Martin running for the Metro seat. Both won re-election.

In 1989, he was an active supporter of the early proposals for what would eventually become the Bay Adelaide Centre, as well as collaborating with Mel Lastman on proposals to find alternate funding models that would facilitate construction of the Line 4 Sheppard subway line.

He did not run for re-election in the 1991 Toronto municipal election. Olivia Chow, at the time a trustee on the Toronto District School Board, won the NDP nomination for his seat over Lee Zaslofsky, and won the seat.

== Post-political work ==
Martin was subsequently appointed by the provincial government of Bob Rae to a position with the Ministry of Municipal Affairs and Housing, tasked with helping to reduce bureaucratic red tape in development applications.

In 1997, Martin and Fred Dominelli purchased land near the Canadian National Exhibition for $280,000, which later stood to gain them a significant profit when the land was proposed for acquisition by the city, at a potential price of $6.8 million, to facilitate the extension of Front Street from Bathurst to Dufferin. The extension remained mired in bureaucratic issues at city hall, and was officially abandoned by city council in 2009.
