= Dan Leckie =

Canadian politician (1949–1998)

Toronto City Councillor for Ward 5
- In office 1994–1997
- Preceded by: Elizabeth Amer
- Succeeded by: wards reorganized following Municipal amalgamation of Toronto

Personal details
- Born: 1949 Sarnia, Ontario, Canada
- Died: May 30, 1998 (aged 48–49) Toronto, Ontario, Canada

Dan Leckie (1949 – May 30, 1998) was a Canadian politician, who served on Toronto City Council from 1994 to 1997.

Born in Sarnia, Ontario, he attended the Jesuit-run Brebeuf College School and then studied political science at the University of Toronto. After graduating, he ran for a seat on the Toronto District School Board in the 1972 election, winning the seat and serving on that body until 1978. He was chair of the board in the final year of his term.

He then served as a policy advisor in the office of mayor John Sewell. After Sewell's defeat in the 1980 election, Leckie ran as an Ontario New Democratic Party candidate for St. George in the 1981 provincial election, but lost to Susan Fish of the Ontario Progressive Conservative Party.

He then worked in the offices of MP Dan Heap from 1981 to 1986, and city councillor Jack Layton from 1986 to 1991. In the 1991 municipal election, he was campaign manager for Layton's unsuccessful run for Mayor of Toronto.

When Heap announced in 1991 that he would not run for reelection in the 1993 election, Leckie was considered a possible new NDP candidate for his seat in Trinity—Spadina. He did not run, but was instead campaign manager for Winnie Ng.

Leckie ran for the Ward 5 seat on Toronto City Council in the 1994 municipal election. Early in his term, he faced criticism from budget chief Tom Jakobek when he used a $10,000 surplus from the office budget of his predecessor Elizabeth Amer to hire temporary staff for his office in the first month of his term; although this use of the funds was entirely legal according to the city budget rules, Jakobek called the expense unfair because not all new councillors had similar budget surpluses available to them, and vowed to change the budget allocation rules to prevent such spending in the future.

While serving on council, Leckie championed environmental initiatives, opposed the expansion of the Toronto Island Airport, supported proposals to replace the Gardiner Expressway with a tunnel to enable redevelopment of Toronto's waterfront, and was an active opponent of the municipal amalgamation of Toronto proposal in 1997.

Following the municipal amalgamation, Leckie did not run for reelection to the new "megacity" council in the 1997 municipal election, instead taking a position as chair of the Toronto Atmospheric Fund. On May 25, 1998, he suffered an aneurysm and collapsed, and remained in hospital until his death on May 30.

In 2002, Toronto City Council passed a motion formally renaming part of Portland Street (from Queen's Wharf Road to Queen's Quay) in the city as Dan Leckie Way.
