= Angelo Natale =

Angelo Natale is a former trade union leader and candidate for political office in Toronto, Ontario, Canada. He served as leader of the Ontario Haulers' Association in the 1970s and 1980s, and campaigned in several municipal elections.

== Early career ==
Natale was the leader of the Ontario Haulers' Association during the 1970s and 1980s. He led an independent truckers' protest at Queen's Park in 1973, demanding better wages, and led an attempted boycott of Metro Toronto's snow clearing services in January 1974. In later years, the Haulers' Association would block off access to Queen's Park several times to protest against Ontario's trucking laws.

Natale campaigned for a seat on the North York City Council in the 1974 municipal election. In the 1976 campaign, he sought election to the North York Board of Control. He lost both times.

== Trials ==
In 1978, Natale and three others were arrested on charges of conspiracy to commit extortion. The following year, he was found guilty of extorting $12,700 from Nicola Torres, the president of Torres Transport Ltd. of Mississauga, by threatening work stoppages. Notwithstanding his ruling, the presiding judge also found that allegations of "Jimmy Hoffa-like" tactics against Natale were not supported by evidence. Natale was sentenced to a 90-day prison term. He successfully appealed the sentence, and a new trial was ordered in 1981. After several delays, Natale and his associates were found not guilty of all charges in May 1983. After the verdict, Natale told reporters that suggestions of mafia links had been hurtful to himself and his family.

== Later career ==
Natale returned to political life in the 1985 municipal campaign, unsuccessfully seeking election to the North York Board of Control. He campaigned for a seat on the Metro Toronto council in the 1988 and 1991 elections, losing to Mario Gentile the first time, and to Maria Augimeri the second time.

He was fifty-four years old at the time of the 1988 election and worked as a mortgage consultant. He described 75% of welfare recipients as "parasites", and indicated that they should be forced to work if they were able. He also supported day care programs to help mothers leave the welfare system, and called for a crackdown on crime.

During this campaign, Natale filed an injunction to prevent Mario Gentile from using the word "re-elect" on his signs. Gentile had previously served on Metro Toronto Council for nine years, but had not technically been elected to the position as North York did not introduce direct elections for Metro councillors until 1988 (he had been elected as a North York councillor, and was chosen by council as a Metro representative). The judge dismissed the accusation as one of semantics.

In 1991, Natale called for a stronger police presence and more job opportunities for the unemployed.

Natale led another protest at Queen's Park in 1992, this time as president of the Ontario Aggregate Haulers Benevolent Association. He opposed provincial legislation passed in late 1991 that established loan brokers for the trucking industry, arguing that truckers were at risk of being exploited. Transport Minister Gilles Pouliot argued that the change was needed to bring order to the brokers' industry, and noted that brokers were required to post bonds under the new law as a standard of reliability. The protest ended after a few days.

Natale was banned from campaigning in the 1994 municipal election after failing to file reports from his 1991 campaign.
