= Greater Toronto Services Board =

Greater Toronto Services Board (GTSB) was created in 1998 under the Greater Toronto Services Act by the province of Ontario and began sessions in 1999. It was created following the amalgamation of the City of Toronto. In some ways it was seen as a replacement for Metro Toronto Council and regional councils around Toronto. With the lack of real political power, the GTSB ceased to exist in 2001.

The board met at the Black Creek Pioneer Village administration building at 1000 Murray Ross Parkway in North York.

== Board ==
The GTSB comprised local politicians appointed by their respective councils:

- Mayor of Toronto
- 10 Toronto City Councillors
- city councillor of the City of Mississauga (and also a member of Peel Region Council)
- Mayor of Hamilton, Ontario

York Region was later added as a member of the GTSB.

Members of GTSB included:

- Alan Tonks 1999-2000 - Chair
- Gordon Chong 2001 - Chair
- Mel Lastman - member from Toronto 1999-2001
  - Case Ootes - alternate for Mayor Lastman
- Toronto City Councillors (and alternates)
- Joanne Flint
  - Bill Saundercook
- Dennis Fotinos
  - Betty Disero
- Mario Giansante
  - Mike Tzekas
- Tom Jakobek
  - Jack Layton
- Norm Kelly
  - Doug Holyday
- Joan King
  - Ron Moeser
- Chris Korwin-Kuczynski
  - Mario Silva
- Howard Moscoe
  - Maria Augimeri
- Joe Pantalone
  - Sherene Shaw
- David Shiner
  - Bas Balkissoon
- Hazel McCallion - member from Peel Region 1999-2001
- William F. Bell - member from York Region and former Mayor of Richmond Hill, Ontario
- Bob Morrow - member from Hamilton, Mayor of Hamilton 1999-2000
- Robert E. Wade - member from Hamilton, Mayor of Hamilton 2000-2001

== Powers ==
The GTSB had power to deal with school taxes, but the only real power was the operation and financial responsibility for GO Transit from 1998 to 2001.
