= Kay Gardner =

Kay Gardner may refer to:

- Kay Gardner (composer), an American musician and Dianic priestess
- Kay Gardner (politician), a city councilor of Toronto, Canada
