= Victor Coleman =

Canadian poet

- Born: November 9, 1944 (age 81); Toronto, Ontario, Canada
- Writing career
- Genre: Poetry
- Notable awards: Harbourfront Festival Prize (2000)

Victor Coleman (born September 9, 1944) is a Canadian poet.

== Biography ==
Born in Toronto, Coleman was the first editor at Coach House Books from 1966 until 1975. After his tenure in publishing, he managed the multidisciplinary art centre, A Space in Toronto for four years. He has also taught film studies and creative writing at Queen's University and creative writing at York University.

His sister, Elizabeth Amer, served two terms on Toronto City Council in the 1980s and 1990s, and has been a prominent advocate for the housing rights of residents of the Toronto Islands.

== Bibliography ==
- Old Friends' Ghosts: Poems 1963-68 (1970)
- Terrific at Both Ends (1978)
- Captions for the Deaf (1979)
- From the Dark Wood (1985)
- Corrections (1985)
- Lapsed WASP (1994)
- The Exchange: Poems 1984-95 (1999)
- LETTER DROP (2000)
- Honeymoon Suite/ Letter Drop (2001)
- MI SING (2004)
- Icon Tact (2006)
- Driven To Our Knees (2008)
- Mal Arme: Letter to Drop III (2008)
- The Occasional Troubadour (2010)
- O - Three Lectures and a Postscript (2010)
- IvH: An Alphamath Serial (2012)
- Miserable Singers: Book One (2014)

== See also ==
- Canadian literature
- Canadian poetry
- List of Canadian poets
