= Howard Levine (politician) =

Canadian politician (born 1947)

Toronto City Councillor for Ward 14
- In office 1988–1994
- Preceded by: Michael Gee
- Succeeded by: Howard Joy

Personal details
- Born: Howard Jerrold Levine; June 29, 1947 (age 78) Toronto, Ontario, Canada

Howard Jerrold Levine (born June 29, 1947) is a Canadian politician, who represented Ward 14 on Toronto City Council from 1988 to 1994.

== Background ==
Born in Toronto in 1947 to parents Eva and Philip Levine, Howard Levine earned his bachelor of arts in political science and urban planning from the University of Waterloo, and his masters in environmental studies, urban planning and public transportation from York University.

Prior to his election as a city councillor, Levine was a transportation planner with Toronto's planning and development department.

== Activism ==
Levine is both a gay and public transit activist. Levine was involved with Chutzpah, an advocacy group for LGBTQ Jews in Toronto that operated from 1982 to 1991.

In 1972 Levine was one of the founding members of the Streetcars for Toronto committee. It successfully advocated the retention, and upgrading, of Toronto's streetcar system which was in question in the early 1970s when there was a proposal to eliminate street car service in Toronto by the year 1980.

== Political career ==
Levine ran in Ward 14 (Forest Hill) in the 1988 Toronto municipal election defeating incumbent Michael Gee. Gee, the budget chief on the previous council, was characterised as a pro-development candidate, while Levine won with a modest and inexpensive campaign that focused on the need to rein in excessive development that was not in keeping with community interests.

He was the main proponent, as a member of the Toronto Hydro Commission, of a proposal to replace all overhead electrical power lines in the City of Toronto with underground wires over a 20-year period. The plan was adopted in the late 1980s, but was ultimately abandoned due to cost in 1998 after 8 years.

In 1989 Levine was one of several councillors, led by Bill Boytchuk, who opposed the twinning of the City of Toronto with the Soviet cities of Kyiv and Volgograd, given the history of the persecution of Jews in the Soviet Union. He refused to participate in the vote, and left the council chamber before the vote was held.

In 1990, Levine was one of five councillors, alongside Jack Layton, Nadine Nowlan, Elizabeth Amer and Marilyn Churley, who opposed a Toronto city council resolution supporting a bid by the city for the 1996 Olympic Games.

Levine was one of seven councillors who voted against renaming a portion of Peter Street to Blue Jays Way.

Levine was reelected in the 1991 Toronto municipal election. He refused to use traditional campaign signs in his campaign on environmental grounds. He lost in his run for a third term against Howard Joy in the 1994 Toronto municipal election.

Despite generally taking supportive positions on LGBTQ issues, including the extension of spousal benefits to same-sex partners of city employees and the official declaration of Pride Day as a city-sponsored event, Levine was not out as gay during his political career, with Kyle Rae instead earning the distinction of being Toronto's first out gay city councillor when he was elected alongside Levine in 1991. Levine's own sexual orientation was never known on the public record until the 2010s, when he and lawyer and judge Harvey Brownstone played key roles in an exhibit of the Ontario Jewish Archives dedicated to Jewish LGBTQ activist Johnny Abush.

He attempted a return to politics in the 2003 Toronto municipal election, running against Joe Mihevc in Ward 21 St. Paul's, but was not successful.
