= Peter Maloney (politician) =

Canadian lawyer, businessman, activist and former politician

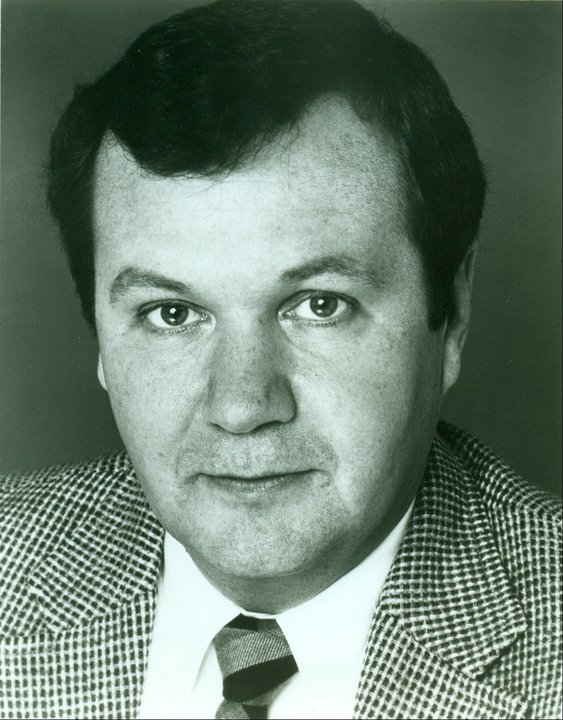
- Born: 1945 (age 80–81); Canada
- Occupations: Lawyer, activist, politician

Peter Maloney is a Canadian lawyer, businessman, activist and former politician, most noted as one of the first Canadian political figures ever to come out as gay and as a prominent builder of Toronto's LGBT community in the 1970s and 1980s.

== Political career in early 1970s ==
Maloney ran as an Ontario Liberal Party candidate in the riding of St. George in the 1971 Ontario provincial election, against incumbent MPP Allan Lawrence. At the time, he was working as an economist at the Toronto Stock Exchange. Although initially seen as a longshot due to the Liberal Party's weakness in the Toronto area at the time, as the campaign progressed he appeared to have built a stronger than expected chance of winning; however, he was defeated on election day. Despite having run a modest, careful campaign, he was subsequently forced to file for bankruptcy, focusing significant attention on the Canadian political system and the challenges an electoral campaign can pose for a candidate who is not already independently wealthy.

At a party policy conference in February 1972, Maloney formally came out as gay while criticizing federal Justice Minister Otto Lang over anti-gay discrimination in federal laws. While homosexuality had already been decriminalized, many laws, including immigration and human rights policies around LGBT issues, remained discriminatory. Later in 1972, he ran as a candidate for school trustee for Ward 6 for the Toronto Board of Education in the 1972 municipal election, becoming Canada's first known openly gay candidate for political office; he was not elected, but came a close third behind the two winning candidates and ahead of six others.

== LGBT activities in 1970s and 1980s ==
Maloney later became an investor in several gay-oriented businesses in Toronto, including the gay magazine Esprit and the Club Baths. He also attended law school, remained active within the Liberal Party, and was manager of George Hislop's campaign for Toronto City Council in the 1980 municipal election.

On December 11, 1980 Maloney led a delegation from the Canadian Association of Lesbians and Gay Men, consisting of himself, Chris Bearchell, George Hislop, Paul-François Sylvestre, and Monique Bell, before the Special Joint House and Senate Committee on the Constitution of Canada, advocating for the inclusion of sexual orientation as a prohibited ground of discrimination in the Equality Rights provisions of Section 15 of the Canadian Charter of Rights and Freedoms.

In 1981, he again sought the Liberal nomination in St. George following the retirement of Margaret Campbell, but lost the nomination to Bruce McLeod. He attributed the loss to his sexuality, claiming that party insiders had dismissed him as a "single issue candidate" who could not win over non-gay voters in the district.

Later the same year, as an owner of the Club Baths he faced criminal charges resulting from Operation Soap; by this time a practicing lawyer, he successfully defended himself and many of the clients facing charges. He was subsequently a founder of the Citizens' Independent Review of Police Activities (CIRPA), a police watchdog group. During this era, however, the police regularly maintained surveillance on both Maloney and Hislop.

== Political activities in 1980s ==
After John Sewell's resignation from Toronto City Council in 1984, Maloney ran in the resulting by-election, but lost to Dale Martin. He ran again in the 1985 municipal election, losing to Martin again, and in the 1988 municipal election, losing to Elizabeth Amer.

Although Maloney had been a competitor of lawyer Susan Eng in the 1984 by-election, Eng endorsed Maloney in the subsequent regular elections and the two remained closely allied thereafter. In 2007, leaked police documents revealed that in 1991, while Eng was chair of the Toronto Police Services Board, the police illegally wiretapped numerous telephone conversations between Eng and Maloney. The police were opposed to Eng's leadership of the board, and Julian Fantino, at the time a superintendent within the force, continued to consider Maloney a security risk.

He currently resides in Kitchener, where he remains active in politics as president of the Liberal electoral district association in Kitchener South—Hespeler and was executive assistant to MP Marwan Tabbara.
