= Stan Wadlow =

Alderman

Personal information
- Full name: W. Stanley Wadlow
- Date of birth: 25 December 1903
- Date of death: 27 July 1989 (aged 85)
- Place of death: East York, Ontario
- Position: Midfielder

Senior career*
Years	Team	Apps	(Gls)
1924–1925	Caledonians F.C.		
1926–1928	Mimico Beach		
1929–1931	Toronto Maple Leafs		
1931	Toronto CNR		
1932–1933	Toronto Ulster United		
1933–1937	Toronto Maple Leafs		
1938–1942	Toronto Scottish		
- * Club domestic league appearances and goals

W. Stanley Wadlow (December 25, 1903 – July 27, 1989) was an alderman for East York, Ontario, served as the borough's commissioner of Parks and Recreation, and a former soccer player.

== Military and Soccer career ==
Wadlow served as a Lieutenant with the Royal Canadian Navy during World War II. He also enjoyed a lengthy career in playing soccer, where he initially began playing in 1917 with the Bolton Avenue school team. In 1923, he played in the Inter-City League with Caledonians F.C., and then played in the Senior First Division with Mimico Beach in 1926. In 1929, he played in the National Soccer League with Toronto Maple Leafs. In 1931, he played with Toronto CNR, and later with Toronto Ulster United in 1932. He returned to the Maple Leafs in 1933, where he served as team captain and received the Noble Garrett trophy. In 1938, he was transferred to Toronto Scottish, where he retired in 1942.

== Politics ==
After his soccer career, he became involved in East York's public services as a recreation director. In 1961, he contributed to the construction of the East York Recreation Community Centre, which later was renamed in his honor. In 1965, he was named deputy commissioner of Parks and Recreation for East York. In 1971, he retired from his duties as commissioner of Parks and Recreation and was elected to East York's council in 1972 as an alderman for Ward 1. In 1985, he was elected as the vice chairman for East York's Hydro commission and retired in early 1989.

== Personal life ==
He was married to Lillian French and had two sons, Donald and George. He was a member of the United Church of Canada as a lay preacher. He died on July 27, 1989, after a lengthy illness in East York.
