= Martin Silva =

Canadian radio personality (born 1952)

Toronto City Councillor for Ward 4
- In office 1988–1997
- Succeeded by: ward renamed

Toronto City Councillor for Trinity—Spadina
- In office 2006–2006
- Preceded by: Olivia Chow
- Succeeded by: Adam Vaughan

Personal details
- Born: September 4, 1952 (age 73) Sever do Vouga, Aveiro, Portugal
- Party: New Democratic Party
- Occupation: broadcaster

Martin Silva (born September 4, 1952) is a Portuguese-born Canadian radio personality and former politician based in Toronto, Ontario.

== Biography ==
Born in Sever do Vouga, Aveiro, Portugal, he emigrated to Canada in August 1968, where he gained popularity in the Portuguese community as a radio announcer on CHIN Radio. In 1973 he hosted a Portuguese language morning show called Ecos de Portugal and continued with Wake Up Portuguese Style in 1982.

He was elected to the Toronto City Council in 1988 as Ward 4 councillor. A member of the New Democratic Party's Toronto caucus, he was re-elected in 1991 and 1994. Silva was the Ontario New Democratic Party's candidate in Parkdale in the 1995 provincial election but was defeated by incumbent Liberal MPP Tony Ruprecht.

He wasn't re-elected in the 1997 municipal election, when he came third after Joe Pantalone and Mario Silva in a newly formed ward. There appeared to be some confusion amongst voters as he shared the same last name with Mario Silva.

After the election he served as a union representative for the Hotel Employees, Restaurant Employees Union (HERE), Local 75 and then returned to CHIN Radio in late 2001.

On February 1, 2006, Toronto City Council appointed Silva to fill the vacancy in Ward 20 that was created when Olivia Chow decided to run in the federal riding of Trinity-Spadina. Silva served as councillor until the 2006 municipal election in November 2006. A condition of the appointment was that he wasn't allowed to run as a candidate in that election.

His vocation for radio came early. and he continues at CHIN Radio, now in the position of Account Executive.
