= Anne Johnston =

Canadian politician (1932–2019)

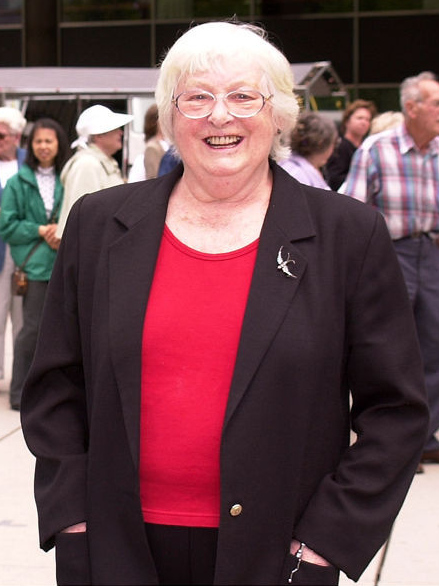
- Johnston in 2003

Toronto City Councillor for (Ward 16) Eglinton-Lawrence
- In office December 1, 2000 – November 30, 2003
- Preceded by: New ward
- Succeeded by: Karen Stintz

Toronto City Councillor for Ward 22 - North Toronto
- In office January 1, 1998 – November 30, 2000
- Preceded by: New ward
- Succeeded by: Ward abolished

Metro Councillor for Ward 15 - North Toronto
- In office December 1, 1988 – December 31, 1997
- Preceded by: Kay Gardner
- Succeeded by: Ward abolished

Toronto City Councillor for Ward 11 - North Toronto
- In office December 1, 1972 – November 30, 1985
- Preceded by: David Rotenberg and David Crombie
- Succeeded by: Michael Gee

Personal details
- Born: August 31, 1932 Wales
- Died: June 26, 2019 (aged 86) Toronto, Ontario
- Children: 5
- Occupation: Occupational therapist

Anne Johnston (August 31, 1932 – June 26, 2019) was a Canadian politician and community activist. She was a longtime city councillor in Toronto, Ontario, Canada. She was first elected to Toronto City Council in 1972, and served until 1985 when she ran against incumbent Mayor Art Eggleton, but was defeated. In 1988 she was elected to Metro Toronto Council (in the first election where Metro Councillors were directly elected). She served until Toronto was amalgamated into the megacity in 1997. That year, she was elected to the new Toronto City Council and served until 2003, when she was defeated by Karen Stintz. At the time of her defeat, she was the longest-serving and the oldest member of Toronto council.

Johnston was also a candidate for Mayor of Toronto in 1978, when she lost to Fred Beavis in a deadlocked council vote for David Crombie's interim replacement; that vote literally came down to Beavis' name being drawn out of a hat.

She campaigned for the Legislative Assembly of Ontario in the 1981 provincial election as a member of the Ontario Liberal Party, and lost to Progressive Conservative incumbent Larry Grossman in St. Andrew—St. Patrick by 3,835 votes.

Johnston attempted to unseat Art Eggleton as mayor in the 1985 municipal election but was defeated 92,994 votes to 59,817. She returned to elected office in the 1988 when she was acclaimed as Metro Councillor for North Toronto.

In the late 1990s, Johnston's queries into the city's computer leasing deal led to the establishment of the MFP Inquiry which unearthed corrupt practices in the deal and reforms in the city's public accountability framework.

For most of her career, Johnston was known as a progressive voice on council. In her final term she supported a controversial condominium development at the corner of Yonge and Eglinton in 2002 adjacent to her ward. The North Toronto Tenants Network was so incensed by Johnston's move that they ran an advertisement in a local community paper, seeking applicants to contest Johnston's council seat. Stintz responded, and defeated Johnston in the 2003 municipal election by 2,321 votes.

Johnston chaired the Toronto Seniors' Assembly and has been appointed as the group's Seniors' Advocate. The Anne Johnston Health Station in Toronto is named after her.

== Personal ==
Johnston was born in Wales and immigrated to Canada landing first in Montreal in the 1950s where she worked at a psychiatric hospital and then relocated to Toronto to work at the Queen Street Mental Health Centre.

Johnston died in Toronto and survived by her five children Heather Stauble, Keri Johnston, Robert Johnston, Jane Johnston and Tim Johnston as well as her eight grandchildren.
