= Beverley Salmon =

Canadian activist and politician (1930–2023)

Beverley N. Salmon CM OOnt
- Born: Beverley Bell; December 25, 1930; Toronto, Ontario, Canada
- Died: July 6, 2023 (aged 92); Toronto, Ontario, Canada
- Education: University of Toronto
- Occupations: Nurse, activist, politician

Beverley Noel Salmon CM OOnt (née Bell; December 25, 1930 – July 6, 2023) was a Canadian activist and municipal politician in Toronto, Ontario. Salmon was a North York city and then Metro Toronto Councillor from 1985 to 1997. Salmon was awarded the Order of Ontario in 2016 and the Order of Canada in 2017.

== Early life and education ==
Born in Toronto on December 25, 1930, Salmon was the daughter of Herbert Bell, a Jamaican immigrant, and Violet Bryan, a fifth generation Canadian of Scottish descent. Salmon began her Registered Nursing training at Wellesley Hospital in 1950 and finished a certificate in Public Health Nursing at the University of Toronto in 1954. She was a Victorian Order Nurse (VON) in Toronto from 1954 to 1956. Salmon married Dr.(John) Douglas Salmon in 1956 and the couple had four children.

== Career ==
After completing her training, Salmon started her nursing career in Detroit, Michigan, in 1956. While in the city she had the opportunity to hear leaders of the civil rights movement such as Martin Luther King Jr., and was inspired on her return to Toronto to become involved in civil rights activism.

Salmon was the founding chair of the Toronto Board of Education's Black Liaison Committee, where she worked to institute anti-racism training for teachers and increase coverage of Black history in the curriculum. She was a co-founder of the Urban Alliance on Race Relations and was the Ontario Human Rights Commission's first Black female commissioner.

Salmon first ran for elected office in the 1976 municipal election as alderman for Ward 8 in North York, losing to Alan Milliken Heisey Sr. She ran again as Councillor for Ward 8 in the 1985 municipal election and defeated Andy Borins, who had been removed from office as Ward 8 Councillor during the previous term by a court order due to a court application made by Barbara Greene. She was Toronto's first female black City councillor. While as Councillor, she served as a Toronto Transit Commission Board member for the years 1989 to 1994 and was Vice Chair of the Board in the years 1991 to 1994.

Salmon continued as a Metro Toronto Councillor until her retirement in 1997.

== Death ==
Salmon died in Toronto on July 6, 2023, at the age of 92.

== Awards and honours ==
In 1995, Salmon won the Excellence in Politics award at the 1995 African Canadian Achievement Awards. In 1999, Salmon was on the Federation of Canadian Municipalities's honour roll. Salmon was also awarded the Queen Elizabeth II Diamond Jubilee Medal in 2012, the Order of Ontario (OOnt) in 2016 and became a Member of the Order of Canada (CM) in the 2018 Canadian honours.
