= Lois Griffin (politician) =

Canadian politician

Lois Griffin (born c. 1942) is a former Metro Toronto councillor (Rexdale-Thistletown) and Chair of the Toronto Transit Commission from 1989 to 1991. She was the first woman to hold the post.

In late 1999, she represented the Humber Watershed Alliance at a water workshop, as part of Toronto's city planning vision workshop series.

She played a major role in creating the Network 2011 plan, and the building of the Sheppard subway line.

Griffin was first elected to Etobicoke borough council as an alderman in 1972 and was re-elected in 1974, 1976, 1978, 1980 and 1982. In 1984, the council voted to appoint her to Etobicoke's Board of Control to fill a vacancy. She was elected a Controller in her own right at the 1985 municipal election. When the Board of Control was abolished in 1988, she ran for Metro Toronto Council from the riding of Rexdale-Thistletown and was re-elected until the amalgamation of Toronto in the 1997 eliminated the Metro level of government as well as Etobicoke's city council. She did not run for the new Toronto City Council and retired from politics.

Preceded by Jeff Lyons	Chairman of the Toronto Transit Commission; 1989–1991	Succeeded by Mike Colle
