= Joan King =

Toronto City Councillor for Ward 12 (Seneca Heights)
- In office 1997–2000

Metropolitan Toronto Councillor
- In office 1988–1997

North York Councillor
- In office 1985–1988

Joan King (1941-2022) was a Canadian school trustee and city councillor. After holding a five-year position on the North York Board of Education from 1980 to 1985, King was a city councillor for North York from 1985 to 1997. Following the amalgamation of Toronto in 1998, she was a Toronto City Councillor from 1997 to 2000. King was awarded the Queen’s Golden Jubilee Medal in 2002.

== Early life ==
King was born in 1941 in Shawinigan, Quebec. She moved to Toronto in 1958 to attend teacher's college. King was an elementary school teacher in North York and Toronto for several years and started on the North York Board of Education in 1980.

== Political career ==
She left her education career in 1985 and was elected as the North York city councillor for Ward 13 in the 1985 Toronto municipal election. In 1988, she moved to the Metropolitan Toronto Council. As city councillor, King was a major contributor to the planned landfill at Adams Mine in 1991, which was later abandoned. King kept her position on the Metropolitan Toronto council until 1997 when she was elected to the Toronto City Council. Before the 2000 Toronto municipal election, King announced that she would not be running for city council again.

Outside of her role as city councillor, King was elected as vice-president of the Association of Municipalities of Ontario (AMO) in 1996 and as a member of the AMO's board of directors from 1997 until 2001. King was also a member of the Waste Diversion Organization and the Greater Toronto Services Board.

=== Honours ===
In 2001, King was named onto an honour roll by the AMO. In 2002, she received the Queen’s Golden Jubilee Medal.

== Later life ==
After leaving politics in 2000, King created her own consulting company and worked with an environmental engineering firm.

In 2010, King was named a member of a proposed municipal reform panel for Toronto mayoral candidate George Smitherman.

King died on January 27, 2022.
