= June Rowlands =

Canadian politician (1924–2017)

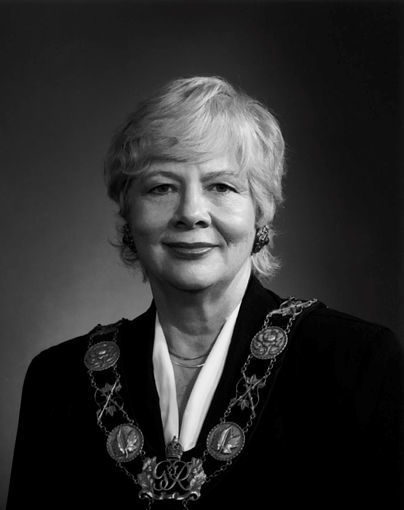
- Official portrait, 1991

60th Mayor of Toronto
- In office December 1, 1991 – November 30, 1994
- Preceded by: Art Eggleton
- Succeeded by: Barbara Hall

Personal details
- Born: June Pendock; May 14, 1924 Saint-Laurent, Quebec, Canada
- Died: December 21, 2017 (aged 93) Toronto, Ontario, Canada
- Party: Independent (municipal)
- Other political affiliations: Liberal (federal)
- Spouse: Harry Rowlands (div.)
- Children: 5

June Rowlands (née Pendock; May 14, 1924 – December 21, 2017) was a Canadian politician who was the 60th mayor of Toronto from 1991 to 1994. She was the first woman to serve as Toronto's mayor. Rowlands also served as a city councillor and was chair of the Metropolitan Toronto Police Commission.

== Early years ==
Rowlands was born as June Pendock in 1924 in Saint-Laurent, Quebec, and raised in Toronto. She graduated from the University of Toronto. Before public life Rowlands worked as a customer representative with Bell Canada. Rowlands served with the Association of Women Electors and National Council on Welfare in the 1970s.

She was also president of the Metro Family Service Association and served on the board of directors of the Central Mortgage and Housing Corp.

She and her husband Harry Rowlands (1922–1989), whom she divorced, raised five children.

== Political career ==
Rowlands was elected to Toronto City Council in 1976. She served as the junior alderman for Ward 10 covering Rosedale and part of North Toronto. In 1978, she topped the vote in her ward becoming its senior alderman with the added duty of sitting on Metro Council. In the 1980s, as a Metro Councillor, she was appointed to sit in the Toronto Transit Commission becoming the first woman member of that body. She attempted to enter federal politics by running for the Liberal Party of Canada in the 1984 federal election. She ran in the suburban riding of York—Scarborough, far from her electoral base in the old City of Toronto, and was defeated by Progressive Conservative Paul McCrossan.

Rowlands remained on both Metro and Toronto City Councils until the 1988 municipal election in which she did not run but accepted an appointment as Chair of the Police Commission. In 1991, she left the commission after being replaced as commissioner by Susan Eng.

=== Mayor of Toronto ===
Rowlands was elected mayor in 1991 after a campaign that focused on law and order. The election began with a group of three centre-right women: Rowlands, Susan Fish, and Betty Disero. The left was mostly unified behind City Councillor Jack Layton. Eventually, right wing support coalesced around Rowlands, and she was elected by a two-to-one margin over Layton after the withdrawal of her fellow female candidates.

Rowlands is commonly associated with a 1991 incident in which the emerging Toronto pop group Barenaked Ladies was barred from performing at the city's annual New Year's Eve show at Nathan Phillips Square on the grounds that the group's name objectified women. Rowlands maintained that the decision was taken by city staff in the Protocol Office, not herself. On September 5, 1994, Rowlands attempted to present a key to the city to the Barenaked Ladies before their concert in Toronto. However, the band refused to accept it, with Barenaked Ladies singer Steven Page later stating, "she doesn't have my vote", in reference to the election later that year. During her mayoralty, the city bid for Expo '98, losing to Lisbon, Portugal.

After one term in office, Rowlands was defeated in 1994 by Barbara Hall, and retired from politics.

== Death ==
Rowlands died in her sleep at a long-term care facility in downtown Toronto on December 21, 2017, aged 93.

Toronto Mayor John Tory offered his condolences, and flags at Toronto City Hall, Metro Hall and other civic centres were lowered to half-mast until December 29, 2017.

== June Rowlands Park ==
June Rowlands Park
- Interactive map of June Rowlands Park
- Location: 220 Davisville Ave, North Toronto (Davisville Village)
- Coordinates: 43°42′02″N 79°23′18″W
- Created: 1923
- Operator: Toronto Parks, Forestry and Recreation Division
- Website: June Rowlands Park

June Rowlands Park, formerly Davisville Park, was renamed in 2004 in recognition for her dedication to the City of Toronto. Located on the northwest corner of Davisville Avenue and Mount Pleasant Road (within her old Ward 10), the park is the recreational hub of the area, with a baseball diamond, a children's playground named after Sharon, Lois and Bram, and a wading pool. The Davisville Tennis Club operates six courts along the north side of the park on Millwood Road.

Political offices
Preceded by Clare Westcott	Chair of the Metropolitan Toronto Police Commission; 1989–1991	Succeeded by Susan Eng
