= Metro New Democratic Party =

Municipal political party in Canada

- Legalised: Unofficial Party
- Ideology: Social Democracy Democratic Socialism
- Political position: Centre-left to left-wing
- National affiliation: New Democratic Party
- Regional affiliation: Ontario New Democratic Party

The Metro New Democratic Party was a political party in Metropolitan Toronto, Ontario, Canada. It supported candidates for election to the municipal councils and school boards of the six municipalities that made up Metro Toronto. The party was organized by supporters of the social democratic New Democratic Party of Canada, and its provincial wing, the Ontario New Democratic Party (NDP).

Elections in Toronto and its suburbs, as in other municipalities in the Province of Ontario, have traditionally not been the domain of formal political parties. Candidates for election to municipal councils and school boards typically run as individuals, and not as members of political parties.

In the 1970s and 1980s, New Democrats in Metro Toronto attempted to introduce party politics by using campaign materials featuring a "Metro NDP" logo, and by forming an official NDP caucus on Toronto city council. Not all New Democratic city councillors chose to use the NDP colours and logos, however.

Since there was no mechanism for parties to register or to operate officially on the municipal level, the NDP operation was largely informal. Local ward associations were set up to nominate candidates in a number of wards, particularly downtown wards, but no party name ever appeared on a ballot - and there was no mechanism for the Metro NDP to accept election donations.

The attempt to introduce party politics had limited success. Most officials elected came from the City of Toronto, Metro Toronto's urban core: only a handful came from the suburbs.

In 1991 the Toronto NDP held a convention and nominated Jack Layton as its mayoral candidate - the first and last official NDP nominee for the position although CCFer Jimmy Simpson was Mayor of Toronto in 1935 and NDP member William Dennison was mayor from 1966 to 1972. Layton was unsuccessful in his mayoral run losing to June Rowlands.

The growing unpopularity of the Bob Rae government resulted in incumbent NDP councillors and trustees running without a party label in the 1994 municipal election. Thus ended the NDP's formal presence in Toronto municipal politics.

A stronger than expected performance by NDP-aligned councillors running as independents provided a strong argument against reviving party affiliations in the 1997 or subsequent elections.

While members of the NDP co-operate on city council and on the Toronto District School Board, there is no longer an official NDP caucus.

At various times, the Liberals have also attempted to run candidates in Toronto municipal elections, most notably in 1969 when Professor Stephen Clarkson was the nominee of the "Civic Liberals" for the mayor's office. Clarkson came third.

More recently, the name "Metro NDP" has been revived in order to refer to a regional organization of Ontario NDP provincial riding associations in Toronto rather than to a municipal political party.
