= Kay Gardner (politician) =

Canadian politician

Toronto City Councillor
- In office 1985–1995
- Constituency: Metro Ward 11 (1985–1988); Ward 15 (1988–1995)

Personal details
- Born: February 24, 1927 (age 99) Lviv, Poland
- Spouse: Ray Gardner (m. 1947; died 1997)
- Occupation: Library worker

Kay Gardner (born February 24, 1927) was a municipal politician in Toronto, Ontario.

She was born in Lviv, Poland in 1927 and moved with her family to Canada in 1929. The family lived in Alberta and British Columbia. In 1947 she married a journalist, Ray Gardner, in London, England. In 1961, they moved to Toronto where Ray obtained a job with the Toronto Star. They have two sons.

Gardner lived in the Forest Hill neighbourhood and worked for the local library. She organized library programs for seniors and conducted weekly film and lecture seminars. She helped to found a library worker's local chapter for the Canadian Union of Public Employees.

In the 1970s she became involved in a campaign to save a former railway right of way called the Belt Line from development. Eventually this was turned into a pedestrian and bicycling trail called the Beltline Trail. It currently runs from Yonge Street south of Davisville Avenue northwest to the Allen Road and Eglinton Avenue West. In 1999, at the suggestion of councillor Michael Walker, Toronto City Council renamed the park the Kay Gardner Beltline Park in her honour.

She was best known for advocating for tenants' rights. She helped lobby the city to save three low-rise rental apartment buildings on Eglinton Ave. West from conversion to condominiums. At the time they were occupied mainly by seniors on fixed incomes. Her first act as a city councillor was to support a motion for the city to purchase the buildings. They were bought by Cityhome, the city's non-profit housing company.

Gardner first ran for office in 1978 but wasn't elected until 1985, representing Ward 11 in central Toronto. In 1988 she ran for council in the newly formed Ward 15. She served on both City Council and Metro Council until 1997. In November 1997 the first post-amalgamation election was held, and she ran for council in the newly created Ward 22, but came third behind Anne Johnston and Michael Walker.

In 1984 she was awarded the Constance E. Hamilton Award. The award is named for Toronto's first female alderman. The award is given to women in Toronto who have made a significant contribution to helping Toronto women secure equitable treatment, economically, socially, and culturally.
