= Tom Jakobek =

Canadian politician (born 1959)

Toronto City Councillor for Ward 26
- In office 1998–2000 Serving with Sandra Bussin (Note: Each ward in the 1997 election elected two councillors.)
- Preceded by: New Riding
- Succeeded by: Riding abolished

Toronto City Councillor for Ward 9/10
- In office 1985–1997 Serving with Paul Christie (Note: Christie was a junior alderman from 1985-1988. From 1988 he was elected separately for Metro Council from the same ward.)
- Preceded by: Pat Sheppard
- Succeeded by: Riding abolished

Personal details
- Born: 1959 (age 66–67)
- Spouse: Deborah Morrish

Tom Jakobek (born c. 1959) is a former member of the Toronto City Council. He was first elected to council in 1982 after first serving as a school trustee since 1980. He remained a city councillor until 2000.

== Background ==
Jakobek's father emigrated to Canada from Poland. He grew up in The Beaches neighborhood of Toronto.

In high school Jakobek was forced to represent his class in the Student Council, a job no one wanted, as a punishment for talking too much in class. He then served as Student Council President for three years.

Following high school, Jakobek attended the University of Toronto, intending to become a teacher and graduating with a degree in public administration. Jakobek would later return to the university to earn a master's degree in Health Sciences in 2000.

Jakobek is the son-in-law of former veteran Scarborough councillor Ken Morrish.

== Politics ==
While still in college, at age 20 his former librarian arranged a meeting between him and two school trustees, who encouraged him to run for the position himself. In 1980, having spent $13,000 to campaign for a job which paid $7,200/year, the 21 year old Jakobek was elected as a Toronto District School Board, the youngest public school board trustee in the history of Ontario. During the time he represented the district on the School Board, he attended college and worked at a liquor store to pay off his campaign debts and tuition. He gained attention for his support for a bylaw which would have prohibited video games near schools.

Upon graduation from Toronto, Jakobek was accepted into teacher's college, but former City Councillor Fred Beavis convinced him to run for City Council, and he obtained a deferment of his acceptance to teacher's college to campaign for the office. In the 1982 Toronto municipal election, he was elected as a Metro Toronto Councillor representing the Beaches, becoming at age 23 the youngest Metro Councillor in Toronto history.

He was for many years a bulwark of the council's right-wing. He became city of Toronto budget chief in 1990, and held the position for the next ten years despite an attempt by Barbara Hall and others to oust him in 1994. In this capacity, he delivered nine consecutive budgets with no tax increases. Following the city's amalgamation in 1997, Jakobek emerged as a prominent ally of new mayor Mel Lastman.

After departing from the City Council, Jakobek took a break from politics to pursue a master's degree in Health Sciences at the University of Toronto. During his studies he worked for Toronto East General Hospital where he oversaw its economic development initiative. Earning his degree in 2000, Jakobek left the hospital to run his wife's family's company Romlek Enterprises.

=== Campaign for mayor ===
Following Mel Lastman’s retirement, Jakobek decided to run for mayor in Toronto's 2003 municipal election. The election was won by David Miller, with Jakobek placing fifth. Jakobek's campaign was harmed by the Toronto Computer Leasing Inquiry, an investigation initiated by the Toronto City Council in 2002 to evaluate a relationship between Jakobek and MFP Financial Services, a company which leased computers to the City of Toronto. Jakobek's eventual admission that he had lied about accepting gifts from MFP lobbyists was widely reported as part of the investigation. Partly as a result, Jakobek ended up receiving less than 1% of the vote in the 2003 election.

In March 2010, following a four-year investigation, the Ontario Provincial Police announced that no charges would be filed in relation to the inquiry. However, its existence during the campaign prevented Jakobek from receiving endorsements from key players including the Toronto Police Association.

At the center of Jakobek's platform was a proposal to pay off Toronto's then $2 billion debt by selling city-owned parking lots, golf courses and unused municipal buildings. An envisioned Summer Work Plan would hire 10,000 teenagers to clean the city while helping them pay for college education. Similarly, a Financial Aid Pilot Program would help immigrants with experience in health care to pay for recertification in Canada under the theory that the resulting increases in tax revenue would cover the costs of the program.

== Leuty Lifeguard Station ==
The Leuty Lifeguard Station was built in 1920 by the Toronto Harbour Commission along with two others which no longer stand. Jakobek worked there as a lifeguard in the late 1970s for a salary of $83.20/week. In the early 1990s, the City of Toronto planned to tear it down due to its deteriorating condition and to its location which was subject to flooding and erosion, forcing it to be repeatedly moved to higher ground. To prevent its destruction, Jakobek partnered with historians Gene Domagala and Glenn Cochrane to create a group called “Save Our Station (S.O.S.)” which raised $75,000 from the Beach community to preserve it. As a result of this campaign, in 1993 the station was designated a protected structure under the Ontario Heritage Act. As of July 2020, it was still in active use when Jakobek and other Beach area dignitaries celebrated its 100th anniversary, its lifeguards having rescued an estimated 6,000 swimmers over the course of its existence.

== Later life ==
In 2008, Jakobek and his family appeared in the Canadian reality TV show Spoiled Rotten on Slice, which showcased the family's lavish lifestyle. The show was panned by The Globe and Mail' TV critic John Doyle, who characterized the show as being "so appalling that normal people will just want to turn it off."
