= Murray Markin =

North York City Councillor, Ward Four
- In office 1976–1978
- Preceded by: Esther Shiner
- Succeeded by: Howard Moscoe

Personal details
- Born: 1949 (age 76–77)
- Occupation: Consultant

Murray Markin (born c. 1949) is a former politician in Ontario, Canada. He served on the North York city council from 1976 to 1978, and campaigned for the Legislative Assembly of Ontario in 1977. His late brother, Joseph Markin, served on North York's Board of Control from 1974 to 1976.

== Politics ==
Markin was twenty-seven years old when he was elected to the North York council in 1976. He listed himself as a political researcher, and campaigned in support of neighbourhood preservation and completion of the Spadina Expressway. Markin found himself at the centre of controversy during this campaign when seventy-three work orders were mandated for a tenant house that he had recently purchased from a family-owned business. After his election, he served on the North York planning board and legislation committee.

While serving as an alderman, he also campaigned for the riding of Wilson Heights in the 1977 provincial election as a Liberal candidate. He was hospitalized near the end of the campaign, after a large dog chased him down a street where he was canvassing and caused him to trip over a sewer grate. He lost to Progressive Conservative candidate David Rotenberg by 4,235 votes.

Markin was often critical of what he considered inappropriate council spending. He wrote a letter to Toronto Transit Commission chairman Gordon Hurlburt in early 1978, arguing that the cost of a subway art and architecture preview was unwarranted. He also suggested that a pay increase for aldermen be deferred to hire a new secretary for the aldermen's offices.

In August 1978, Markin and North York Mayor Mel Lastman presented a $1,000 audio-visual presentation to the mayor and council of Wrocław, Poland on the "culture, history and topography of North York". The meeting was intended as a visit of friendship between the cities.

He lost his council seat to Howard Moscoe in 1978. He was appointed to the North York planning board later in the same year. He served in this capacity until 1984.

== Later life ==
Markin was arrested on December 9, 1982, after agreeing to sell $3,000 worth of cocaine to an undercover police officer. In July 1984, he was found guilty of trafficking cocaine and sentenced to fifteen months in prison. The presiding judge determined that Markin had advertised himself to the officer as a major player in the cocaine business, but found that there was no solid evidence to back up this claim. Markin was working for a Jewish community organization for disadvantaged children at the time of his conviction, and his fall was a surprise to many in the community. He was described as a political science graduate at the time of his conviction.

== Electoral record ==
=== Municipal politics ===
1978 Toronto municipal election: North York Councillor, Ward Four
Candidate	Votes	%	Notes
Howard Moscoe	2,757	45.74	High school teacher
(x)Murray Markin	1,934	32.09	Incumbent
Eleanor Rosen	630	10.45	
Jean Lance	447	7.42	Tenant activist
Alan Mostyn	259	4.30	Lawyer
Total valid votes	6,027	100.00	

Results taken from the Toronto Star, 14 November 1978
The final results confirmed Moscoe's victory.

1976 Toronto municipal election: North York Councillor, Ward Four
Candidate	Votes	%
Murray Markin	2,073	40.31
Hugh Montgomerie	1,016	19.76
Jean Lance	959	18.65
Martin Lewin	745	14.49
Harbans Varma	350	6.81
Total valid votes	5,143	100.00

61 out of 77 polls reporting.

Results taken from the Toronto Star, 7 December 1976
The final results were not significantly different.

=== Provincial politics ===
1977 Ontario general election: Wilson Heights
Party	Candidate	Votes	%	±%	Expenditures
Progressive Conservative	David Rotenberg	11,430	41.97		$29,496
New Democratic	Howard Moscoe	8,437	30.98		$10,634
Liberal	Murray Markin	7,195	26.42		$14,894
Libertarian	Webster J. Webb	174	0.64		$0
Total valid votes		27,236	100.00		
Rejected, unmarked and declined ballots		307			
Turnout		27,543	62.93		
Electors on the lists		43,771			
