= Howard Moscoe =

Canadian politician (1939–2026)

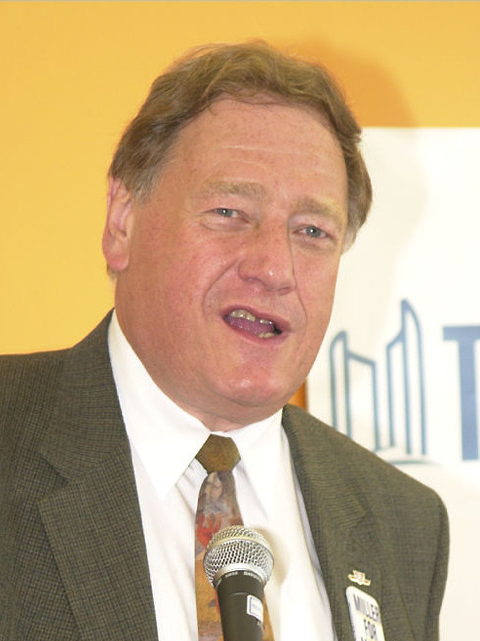
- Moscoe in 2003

Toronto City Councillor for Ward 15 (Eglinton-Lawrence)
- In office December 1, 2000 – December 1, 2010
- Preceded by: Ward created
- Succeeded by: Josh Colle

Chair of Licensing and Standards Committee
- In office December 1, 2006 – December 1, 2010
- Preceded by: Committee created
- Succeeded by: Cesar Palacio

Chair of the Toronto Transit Commission
- In office January 1998 – December 2000
- Preceded by: Paul Christie
- Succeeded by: Brian Ashton
- In office March 2003 – December 1, 2006
- Preceded by: Betty Disero
- Succeeded by: Adam Giambrone

Toronto City Councillor for Ward Eight
- In office January 1, 1998 – December 1, 2000 Serving with Mike Feldman
- Preceded by: Ward created
- Succeeded by: Ward abolished

Metro Toronto Councillor, North York Spadina Ward
- In office December 1, 1988 – December 31, 1997
- Preceded by: Ward established
- Succeeded by: City amalgamated

North York City Controller and Metro Toronto Councillor
- In office 1985–1988 Serving with Robert Yuill, Norman Gardner, Esther Shiner (1985-87) and Mario Gentile (1988)
- Preceded by: Esther Shiner, Barbara Greene, Robert Yuill and William Sutherland
- Succeeded by: Position eliminated

North York Alderman, Ward Four
- In office 1978–1985
- Preceded by: Murray Markin
- Succeeded by: Frank Di Giorgio

Personal details
- Born: November 28, 1939 Toronto, Ontario, Canada
- Died: May 23, 2026 (aged 86) Toronto, Ontario, Canada
- Resting place: Mount Sinai Memorial Park
- Spouse: Gloria Green (m. 1961)
- Children: 3 daughters
- Education: Lakeshore Teachers College, Wilfrid Laurier University (BA), York University (BA), University of Toronto (M.Ed.)
- Occupation: High school teacher

Howard Moscoe (November 28, 1939 – May 23, 2026) was a Canadian politician who was a long-time municipal councillor from 1978 to 2010, sitting on the North York and Metropolitan Toronto Councils and then Toronto City Council following the amalgamation of Toronto in 1998. As an alderman and councillor he represented wards centred on the Wilson Heights and Lawrence Manor neighbourhoods along Bathurst Street.

Among the most prominent and longest-serving councillors in the city, he was also known for an outspokenness which caused controversy at times. Moscoe was a member of the New Democratic Party. On August 31, 2010, after 31 years as an elected municipal politician, Moscoe announced his retirement from city council.

A long-time member of the Toronto Transit Commission board and Toronto's licensing committee, he chaired both bodies at various times, bringing in reforms.

== Early life, education and career ==
Moscoe's father, Alexander, was born to a Jewish family in Łódź, Poland, and moved to Canada as a child before the First World War. His uncle, Joe Moscoe, was the first licensed taxi driver in Toronto (cab licence #1).

Moscoe married Gloria Green in 1961. They had three daughters, all of whom became teachers.

Moscoe was a junior high school art teacher with the North York Board of Education before entering political life, and was president of the North York Elementary Teachers' Federation and a governor of the Ontario Teachers' Federation. He campaigned for a seat on the North York Hydro Commission in 1974, and ran for the Ontario legislature in 1975 and 1977 as the Ontario New Democratic Party candidate in Wilson Heights. Moscoe initially supported extension of the Spadina Expressway to reduce traffic in his riding, but opposed further extension once the freeway was partially completed and renamed as Allen Road.

He was also a successful businessman as a designer and producer of election signs. In the late 1980s, he personally designed a brand of plastic sleeves to prevent rainwater damage during campaigns. He claimed 78 candidates as customers in the 1988 municipal election, and a further eighteen in the 1988 federal election. Moscoe later said that he supplied every sign used by the New Democrats in the 1999 provincial election. He was an active member of the Canadian Jewish Congress, and served on its community relations committee.

Moscoe graduated from Lakeshore Teachers' College and completed BA degrees at Wilfrid Laurier University and York University, and a Master of Education at the University of Toronto.

== North York Council ==
=== Ward Alderman ===
Moscoe was first elected to the North York city council in 1978, defeating incumbent alderman Murray Markin in the city's fourth ward. He and Mike Foster were the only New Democrats on North York council. He soon emerged as a prominent voice on the council's left, and became a frequent critic of Mayor Mel Lastman. Moscoe criticized Lastman's ties to regional developers, arguing that the mayor often used reformist rhetoric to hide a pro-establishment bias. Moscoe once described his rivalry with Lastman by saying, "It's a fundamental difference of opinion. He's the wheeler-dealer, free-enterpriser, step-up-and-see-the-dancing-girls type of politician, while I'm a strong social democrat." This comment notwithstanding, Moscoe quickly developed his own reputation for political theatrics against Lastman. He once purchased one of Lastman's toupees at a charity auction, and used it to dust his chair and desk at the start of council meetings.

He asked the Law Society of Upper Canada to intervene in his 1982 re-election campaign, alleging that rival candidate Sydney Moscoe was running with the deliberate intent of confusing voters. He informed the media that the ten nominees who signed Sydney Moscoe's papers also signed those of Eleanor Rosen, a more serious challenger associated with the Progressive Conservatives. A Supreme Court of Ontario judge ruled that both Moscoes were legitimate candidates. Moscoe was re-elected, although by a reduced margin.

In 1984, Moscoe was a leading supporter of reform legislation to limit campaign contributions to $500 per year and require candidates to declare expenses, contributions and contributors within ninety days of an election. Largely through his efforts, North York became the first municipality in the Toronto area to pass such legislation. Moscoe later supported tax credits for municipal political donations, similar to those used at the provincial and federal levels. Also in 1984, he spoke out against the strict enforcement of an anti-scalping by-law outside Exhibition Stadium during home games by the Toronto Blue Jays baseball team. He argued that some constituents who were not scalpers were given fines for selling extra tickets outside the stadium at face value. To protest the law, he painted a yellow line on the pavement 400 metres from the stadium and declared the area past the line a "free trade zone" for fans to exchange tickets.

Moscoe campaigned for the Ontario legislature a third time in 1985, and finished third against Liberal Monte Kwinter in a provincial swing to the Liberal Party. He was subsequently elected to a seat on the North York Board of Control in the municipal election later in the year, focusing his campaign on issues such as housing and affordable day care.

=== City Controller ===
Moscoe was the only left-leaning member on the city's Board of Control between 1985 and 1988, and was frequently at odds with its other members. He nonetheless rose to a position of administrative leadership, overseeing finances, policy initiatives and a variety of technical matters. On policy, Moscoe promoted the creation of a municipal housing corporation in North York to promote rent-geared-to-income housing. He argued that the city's housing situation was in crisis, and that government inaction would result in a rise in homelessness in later years. He also promoted employment equity, and supported the extension of anti-smoking regulations in the workplace. Moscoe was fighting a personal battle to quit smoking at the time.

In 1986, Moscoe took part in a demonstration organized by members of Toronto's Jewish community against the South African government's policy of apartheid. He was quoted as saying, "The world stood by while Hitler brought in the Nuremberg Laws. It's important we not make the same mistake again." He also described the South African government as "fascist, no matter how you slice it."

Some members of the North York council, including Mel Lastman, attempted to remove Moscoe from the city's planning advisory committee in 1986. Moscoe described the effort as "a thinly veiled direct personal attack on myself", while another councillor later acknowledged that it was intended as punishment for Moscoe's outspokenness against Lastman. He survived the motion by eleven votes to six.

Despite his rivalry with Lastman, Moscoe was the prime mover in a motion naming North York's 1.8-hectare Mel Lastman Square after the mayor in 1986. Shortly before the dedication, he said that Lastman was "responsible for the development of the downtown and the centrepiece of the downtown is the civic square". Some speculated that Moscoe, who had his own ambitions to serve as Mayor of North York, was attempting to hasten Lastman's retirement.

Moscoe was the only North York councillor to oppose a ban on Now Magazine from parts of city hall in 1988. He awarded the magazine a prize for journalistic excellence in March 1988, while serving a week-long term as acting mayor in Lastman's absence.

== Metro Councillor ==
=== Part-time ===
Moscoe's election to the North York Board of Control in 1985 gave him an automatic seat on the Metropolitan Toronto council, which was then a part-time body made up of representatives from six municipal councils. He supported several reforms to the council's operations, including direct election and increased powers of governance. Particularly notable was his call for the Metro Police Commission and Toronto Transit Commission to be governed entirely by elected officials, rather than by mixed bodies of elected officials and appointees.

Moscoe rose to greater prominence in 1988 as a leading critic of proposed Sunday shopping reforms introduced by the provincial government of David Peterson. Moscoe argued that the Peterson government was abdicating its responsibility by permitting municipalities to legislate change on the issue, and described efforts to expand Sunday shopping as "an attack on labour unions, small business and the family". He served as chairman of a task force on Sunday shopping, and oversaw a series of public meetings on the issue in 1990.

=== Full-time ===
==== First term ====
Metro Toronto introduced the direct election of councillors in 1988. Moscoe chose to run for a seat on the new council, and was declared elected when his only opponent withdrew one day after nominations closed. He described his acclamation as bittersweet, in that he had already ordered 25,000 campaign pamphlets. After the election, he supported Dennis Flynn's unsuccessful bid to be re-elected as Metro chairman. Flynn lost to Alan Tonks, whom Moscoe later criticized as "Mr. Indecision" and "Mr. Subcommittee". His daughter, Cheryl Moscoe, was elected to the North York Board of Education as a school trustee in 1988, serving one term.

Moscoe's efforts to reform the Toronto Transit Commission came to fruition in late 1988, when council voted to replace all of the TTC's citizen members with elected officials. Moscoe argued that the change was necessary in light of the Metro councillors' increased responsibilities, adding that the "citizen members" were in fact high-level patronage appointees. One of Moscoe's leading allies in achieving this reform was Chris Stockwell, later a Progressive Conservative cabinet minister in Ontario.

He criticized Mel Lastman's plans to provide public funding for the North York Performing Arts Centre in 1991, arguing that it was an unnecessary expense and that private entrepreneur Garth Drabinsky would be the primary beneficiary. (Drabinsky was later charged with accounting fraud after Livent went bankrupt.) Moscoe also criticized the municipal election reforms passed by David Peterson's government in the same period, arguing that large land developers would be able to avoid donation limits without difficulty.

==== Second and third terms ====
Moscoe was re-elected in the 1991 municipal election, defeating two minor challengers. A Toronto Star survey from the election lists him as the hardest-working member of council, but adds "his effectiveness has been hurt by his penchant for mischief-making, which often casts him in the role of the buffoon". He was appointed to the Toronto Transit Commission after the election.

He became involved with municipal gaming issues in the mid-1990s, and supported the provincial government of Bob Rae in its plans for casino expansion. He served on Toronto's casino committee for the Canadian National Exhibition (CNE), and favoured the introduction of horse race betting in 1994. Moscoe later called for a permanent casino to be established on Exhibition grounds.

Moscoe was a leading opponent of the federal government's decision to sell the Toronto Pearson International Airport in 1993, arguing that the airport should be owned by Toronto-area taxpayers. He described the sale as a "sell-out" orchestrated by members of the governing Progressive Conservative Party, and argued that the deal would be remembered as "the greatest orgy of patronage ever in this country." After the Liberal Party of Canada won the 1993 federal election, Moscoe encouraged new Prime Minister Jean Chrétien to cancel the deal and turn the airport over to a non-profit local authority. Chrétien subsequently cancelled the deal.

He was long a supporter of gay and lesbian rights. He was one of three TTC members to support the group "Toronto Area Gays and Lesbians" (TAGL) in a 1993 controversy over TTC advertising: TAGL had purchased advertising space, only to have their contract revoked when other commission members complained that the content was too controversial. Moscoe also spoke out against Metro's decision to reject funding for two gay and lesbian cultural groups in the same year, urging councillors "not to succumb to a radical, right-wing fringe" in withholding revenue.

In December 1995, Moscoe co-sponsored a successful motion calling for Metro Toronto to block a contract with Shell Canada, on the grounds that its parent company was complicit with human rights violations in Nigeria. In 1996, he opposed a plan to fingerprint welfare recipients.

== Toronto councillor ==
=== 1997–2003 ===
The provincial government of Mike Harris eliminated the Metropolitan Toronto council in 1997, and amalgamated its six former municipalities to create the new City of Toronto. Moscoe supported amalgamation in principle, but was skeptical about the future of social service and education funding under the Harris government's plan. He was elected to the new city council in the 1997 election, while his old nemesis Mel Lastman was elected as the first mayor of the new city. Moscoe soon resumed his role as Lastman's chief critic, but nevertheless won Lastman's support to become chair of the Toronto Transit Commission in January 1998. His term lasted until the 2000 municipal election.

Moscoe was re-elected in 2000 over Tony Rizzo, a former NDP Member of Provincial Parliament who had later crossed over to the Liberal Party. He was reappointed a TTC commissioner, but relinquished the chairmanship to Brian Ashton. He was subsequently reappointed to a second term as TTC chair in March 2003 after Betty Disero's resignation, and was reconfirmed in the position after the 2003 election.

He broke with other left-leaning councillors to vote in favour of a proposed island airport bridge in 2002, even though he actually opposed the bridge in principle. He later explained that his vote was part of a compromise arrangement with Bombardier and developer Robert Deluce to have a large piece of land surrounding the Downsview subway stop set aside for residential development. The city later reached a separate deal with Bombardier, and Moscoe voted against the bridge when the issue was reconsidered in late 2003.

Moscoe was a prominent ally of David Miller, who was elected as Lastman's successor in the 2003 municipal election. Moscoe's own campaign for re-election in 2003 was complicated by a heart virus, which resulted in a rare condition known constrictive pericarditis. He organized most of his re-election campaign from a hospital bed, and did not publicize his illness until later in the year.

=== 2003–2006 ===
Moscoe was strongly critical of a 2004 decision by the provincial government of Dalton McGuinty to negotiate future infrastructural arrangements with the Association of Municipalities of Ontario rather than with individual communities. He argued that the plan was detrimental to Toronto's interests, and suggested that the city might consider leaving the AMO in protest. He was quoted as saying, "We are not going to let the village of East Garafraxa determine how public transit funding is distributed in Toronto". This dispute notwithstanding, Moscoe supported the provincial government's plans to grant increased governmental powers to Toronto. Also in 2004, Moscoe brought forward a successful motion to rename a street in his ward as "Tommy Douglas Gardens".

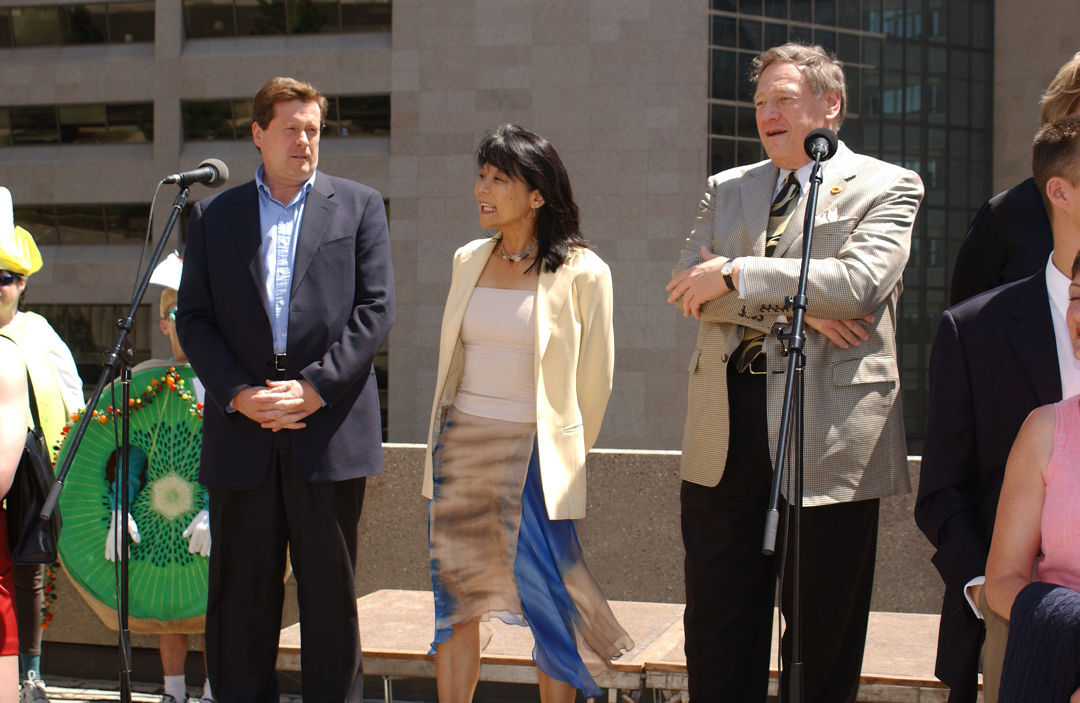
Moscoe (right) with John Tory (left) and Olivia Chow (centre), at a Rainbow flag raising ceremony at Toronto City Hall, 2005

In late 2005, Moscoe amended a municipal motion to include Toronto councillors and the mayor under the terms of a planned 12.25% salary increase for the city's unionized employees. Some members of council later said that they did not notice the change, and were unaware that they were voting themselves a pay increase when they approved the bill. Moscoe denied that any trickery was involved, and suggested that certain councillors were disingenuously trying to appear disinterested in their salaries. He added, "I think we deserve the same raises everybody else got - modest though they may be. I'm not in the slightest bit embarrassed." He withdrew the motion when council reconsidered its raise increase in January 2006, saying that the matter had been "blown all out of proportion" by the media.

==== Council controversies ====
Moscoe was criticized for yelling "fuck" at Rob Ford in a 2004 meeting, for which he later apologized. He initially joked that he had told Ford to "flock off, as the birds do".

He distributed a prankish memo to other councillors in late 2005, entitled "How far will Lady Jane go?", drawing a connection between Jane Pitfield's planned challenge against David Miller in 2006 and Lady Jane Grey's nine-day reign as Queen regnant of England in 1553. He withdrew the memo after complaints, and wrote an apology to Pitfield for any offence given. Rival councillors Karen Stintz and Frances Nunziata argued that the contest was demeaning to women, and Stintz suggested that Moscoe had "a history of making disparaging comments to women". Stintz and David Soknacki signed an affidavit requesting that Moscoe be investigated by the integrity commissioner for the comments. Moscoe argued that the contest was not sexist, acknowledging that it was directed against Pitfield but denying that he was targeting her gender. One Toronto columnist suggested that the memo criticisms were politically motivated in order to aid Pitfield's potential candidacy. Pitfield did not consider the memo offensive, and initially joked that she was planning to enter the contest.

Moscoe was later criticized for allegedly sexist comments made in an exchange with Frances Nunziata in 2006. Nunziata had complained that bus service in her ward was substandard, and asked Moscoe to walk the area's streets for a first-hand view. Moscoe responded by saying, "Councillor, I leave walking the streets to you", which was a play on words referring to "street-walker", a euphemism for "prostitute". He subsequently apologized, adding "on occasion my mouth gets ahead of my brain". Nunziata wrote an open letter to the city's integrity commissioner, asking that Moscoe be censured for his comments.

==== 2006 election ====
In July 2006, a local taxpayer group called the Coalition for Municipal Change announced that it would try to find a challenger for Moscoe in the 2006 municipal election. Moscoe described the Coalition as a "Tory front group who are basically trying to destroy the balance of council", and later said "I always face two or three or four opponents during an election [...] Bring them on." No candidate came forward, and the coalition did not endorse any of Moscoe's opponents. Moscoe defeated Ron Singer, his closest challenger, by about a two-to-one margin.

=== 2006–2010 ===
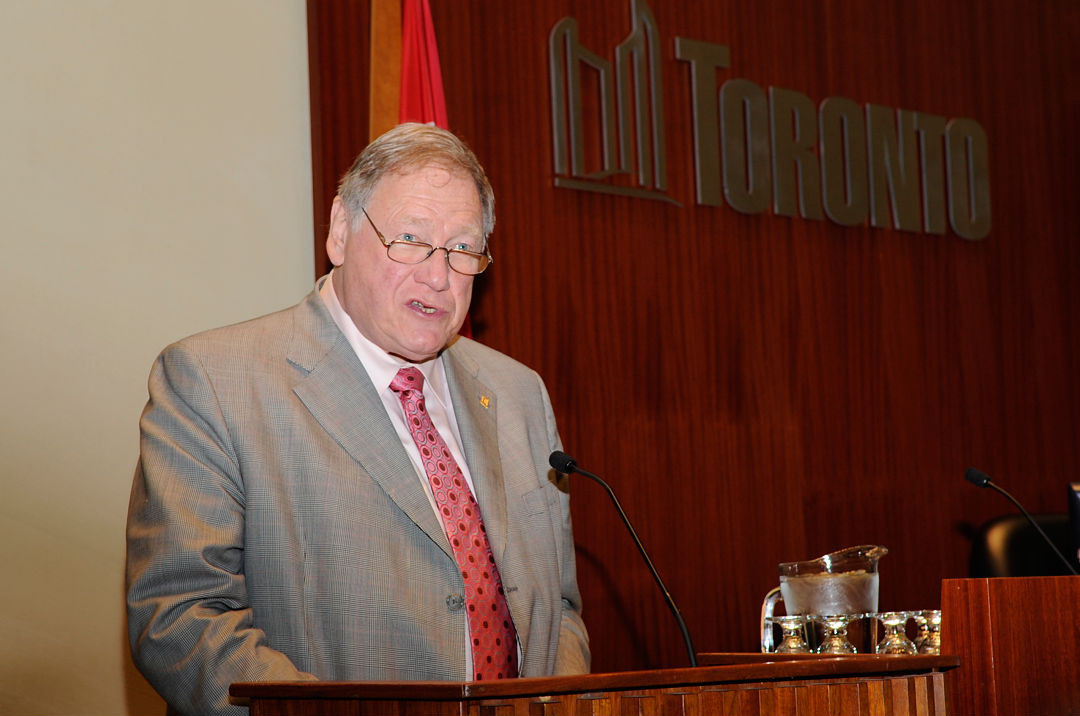
Moscoe speaking at an Award presentation at Toronto City Hall, 2009

Moscoe stood down as TTC chair following the 2006 election, and was selected as chair of Toronto's licensing and standards committee. He was also a member of David Miller's executive committee. Soon after the swearing-in ceremony in December 2006, Moscoe distributed a list of his priorities to journalists, which was highlighted by a plan to license Toronto's landlords. The plan calls for landlords to pay a high per-unit fee if their properties are run down, and a low fee if the buildings are in good shape. "Good landlords have nothing to fear from the licensing scheme because the amounts they are going to pay will be marginal," he said. "The emphasis in whatever scheme we establish must be making the bad landlords pay". He conducted a media tour of the worst-kept buildings in Toronto in early 2007.

Moscoe called for Ontario's disabled parking system to be overhauled, arguing that the current system was both outdated and rampant with abuse. He said that many non-disabled Ontarians were currently using disabled parking permits for convenience purposes. In a letter published in the Toronto Star in February 2007, Moscoe argued that subsidies should be provided to the disabled poor, rather than to those who can afford their own and drive a car.

In late March 2007, Moscoe led the licensing and standards committee in supporting a ban on airport limousines picking up fares in Toronto (a practice sometimes called "scooping"). Council approved the motion the following month, but imposed a one-month delay on its enforcement to allow further negotiations with the Greater Toronto Airport Authority and the City of Mississauga. Several airport drivers protested the new law at city council.

In an unrelated matter, Moscoe attempted to have Toronto's numbered electoral wards given new names in early 2007. The motion was defeated by council.

== Issues ==
=== Transportation ===
Moscoe was long a prominent advocate for public transit in Toronto. As early as 1979, he brought forward a motion to the Federation of Canadian Municipalities calling for senior levels of government to provide operating and capital costs for public transit in cities. He recommended that Toronto take steps to improve its transit network in 1989, following the release of a report indicating that rush-hour traffic would double between 1981 and 2001. He was quoted as saying, "We can no longer afford the absolute luxury of people travelling alone and taking up valuable space on the road. The only solution is to improve public transit and increase disincentives to travel downtown by car." In 1991, he argued that Metro should charge developers for transit projects.

He recommended several reforms to transit policy following his appointment to the TTC in 1991. He supported lower rates for Toronto's poorer residents, arguing that transit passes could be mailed out with welfare cheques. This idea was opposed by then-TTC chair Mike Colle. Moscoe also advocated lower advertising rates for small businesses, noting that a national recession was resulting in many spaces being left unused. He opposed the TTC's elimination of environmentally friendly trolley bus services in January 1992, and led a successful initiative for their restoration later in the same year. Moscoe also opposed a 16% fare increase in 1992, arguing that the TTC could cut expenses through administration instead.

Moscoe criticized the service cutbacks introduced by the provincial government of Mike Harris in the mid-1990s, and spoke against a 43% fare increase for students and seniors in 1996. Moscoe later argued that the Harris government's funding cuts were the start of a long period of decline for the TTC, from which it had not entirely recovered by the mid-2000s.

He joined with other NDP councillors to support increased funding for Wheel-Trans, a transportation service for Toronto's disabled persons, 1995. After the Harris government introduced its funding cuts, however, he reluctantly brought forward a motion to scale back Wheel-Trans services. He described the motion as "the most difficult decision I've had to make", but argued it was necessary to prevent a total collapse in the city's transit system. He recommended that Wheel-Trans users voluntarily limit their non-essential use of the service, so as to ensure that it remained accessible for work and school transportation. He opposed further cuts in 1996, and subsequently supported initiatives to make regular buses wheelchair-friendly.

==== TTC Chair, 1998–2000 ====
Moscoe was appointed TTC chair in January 1998. He soon emerged as a prominent rival to David Gunn, the TTC's chief general manager. The two disagreed over policy issues, including the proposed purchase of low-floor buses to benefit elderly and disabled passengers: Moscoe supported the purchase, while Gunn argued that it was beyond the TTC's budget. Gunn also accused Moscoe of interfering in TTC management issues, particularly after Moscoe renegotiated a contract for condominium development at the TTC's North York Centre and Bayview stations. Gunn threatened to resign in mid-1998 if Moscoe was not removed, but retracted this threat when the TTC reaffirmed its confidence in Moscoe's leadership. Gunn eventually stepped down in April 1999, saying that Moscoe was "ruining his reputation". His replacement, Rick Ducharme, was openly critical of his predecessor's management style and initially had a more cooperative relationship with Moscoe and other elected officials.

There were several attempts to remove Moscoe as TTC chair in 1999, following a threatened strike by TTC workers. During the negotiations, Moscoe had suggested that council should reach a settlement with the workers and then consider a property tax increase to find the necessary revenues. Mel Lastman opposed this proposal, and is widely believed to have coordinated the subsequent efforts to remove Moscoe from office.

Four commissioners on the seven-member TTC board issued a statement on April 7, 1999, indicating that they were prepared to "reconsider the position of chair". Moscoe was able to retain his position at the subsequent April 8 TTC meeting with a deft procedural move that divided the opposition, and later described the attempt to dismiss him as a "kindergarten coup".

His opponents attempted to remove him again on May 11, 1999. That is when TTC commissioners Chris Korwin-Kuczynski and Brian Ashton brought forward a motion before city council to replace the entire TTC board. Ashton acknowledged that the move was intended to replace Moscoe, whom he described as "very incompetent". On June 9, Moscoe again retained his position when council rejected the motion, and instead agreed to a compromise plan which saw two new members added to the board.

The new appointments did not solve Moscoe's difficulties: both new members were opposed to his leadership, and their appointments led to a renewed effort to remove him as chair. Moscoe responded to the threat by introducing a legal challenge against the manner of the new members' selection: both were chosen by a simple majority of council, and Moscoe argued that a two-thirds majority was required. A court ruling in late June 1999 upheld Moscoe's position and invalidated the appointments. After the ruling, Mel Lastman signalled that he was again willing to accept Moscoe as chair. The controversy ended for a time.

There was another effort to remove Moscoe as chair late in 1999, when it was revealed that an employee in his office had faxed confidential documents to a company suing the TTC. Moscoe indicated that he had no awareness of the fax, but submitted a resignation notice to take formal responsibility. The other commissioners planned to reject his resignation after a single day's debate, but commissioner Rob Davis unexpectedly suspended the proceedings and suggested that a broader inquiry be launched. Moscoe then withdrew his resignation, saying that the matter should have been resolved quickly to permit the TTC to return to its regular business. There was a further attempt to dismiss Moscoe in January 2000, but this came to nothing.

Despite these controversies, Moscoe's first tenure as TTC chair was marked by several notable accomplishments. The city purchased hundreds of new subway cars, rebuilt several buses and streetcars and maintained its "state of good repair" schedule despite provincial cutbacks.

==== TTC Chair, 2003–2006 ====
After his reappointment in 2003, Moscoe expressed concern that the provincial government of Ernie Eves was abandoning Toronto transit services in favour of projects in the surrounding municipalities. He proposed a referendum for a 1% property tax hike later in the same year, with the revenues to be targeted toward public transit improvements. The city turned down the proposal.

In 1999, Moscoe began a lobbying effort to have a percentage of provincial revenues directed toward the TTC. He achieved success in 2004, when Premier Dalton McGuinty declared his support for the plan. In the same period, the federal government of Paul Martin announced that it would contribute a portion of its fuel tax revenues to municipal transit, including the TTC. Moscoe welcomed a $1 billion investment over five years from the federal and provincial governments in 2004, and received a separate $90 million infusion from the provincial Liberal government in the same year to stave off a 25-cent fare increase. Moscoe endorsed the Martin government's 2005 budget, which implemented the federal gas-tax plan.

In April 2005, Moscoe led the TTC in last-minute negotiations with the city's transit union to prevent a city-wide strike. Published reports indicate that a shouting match between Moscoe and union president Bob Kinnear sparked the final successful negotiations. When the union accepted a tentative deal, Moscoe remarked, "I feel like a member of the bomb squad who was faced with a green wire and red one and thank God we cut the red wire".

Moscoe oversaw TTC fare increases in both 2005 and 2006. The 2005 increase saw adult fares rise by 25 cents and the price of tickets and tokens rise by ten cents; the TTC attempted to mitigate the inconvenience by simultaneously introducing a $30 weekly transferable pass that could be shared among friends, family and co-workers. Moscoe was quoted as saying, "I don't like having to raise fares. We haven't had a fare hike in two years and it barely covers inflation. We've tried to make it as painless as possible." Critics nevertheless argued that the hike would hurt the city's working poor. A separate ten-cent fare increase in 2006 was justified as a necessary consequence of soaring gas prices in North America. Moscoe argued that the alternative of cutting back services was not a viable option.

He was a prominent supporter of the rebuild of the streetcar right-of-way on St. Clair Avenue. He argued that if the project was cancelled, as some Toronto politicians had suggested, it would be costly and would worsen gridlock in the city. He also called for the province to re-assume responsibility for the western section of the Gardiner Expressway, which was formerly part of the Queen Elizabeth Way (QEW) until it was downloaded to the city in 1998. He suggested that it be renamed the "Dalton McGuinty Expressway" if the province refused.

In March 2006, Moscoe announced that he would support provincial funding for a united transit system covering the Greater Toronto Area from Burlington to Oshawa. He later criticized federal Finance Minister Jim Flaherty's plans for a transit tax credit, arguing that it would be difficult to administer and would only benefit the most affluent transit users. Moscoe also criticized the provincial government's plan to introduce "smart card" transit passes for the Greater Toronto Area, arguing that the city could buy 400 buses with the money being spent on the program.

==== Summer 2006 ====
In May 2006, the Amalgamated Transit Union placed ads in local newspapers suggesting that the TTC was callously denying benefit coverage to injured transit operator Bobby Lowe. Moscoe called the union's allegations false, noting that a different agency was responsible for the payment of employee benefits. Moscoe also said that TTC workers were treated consistently with other injured workers in the province, and noted that injury pay issue was not mentioned during the last bargaining session in April 2005. ATU President Bob Kinnear responded saying that Moscoe was attacking Lowe's honesty. Moscoe apologized to Lowe during a meeting at City Hall, and promised to "sort out our procedures" to ensure that coverage would not be delayed to injured workers in the future.

TTC General Manager Rick Ducharme announced his resignation on June 7, 2006, following a one-day wildcat strike by transit workers. He blamed political interference for his decision, saying that Moscoe had conducted direct negotiations with the union without consulting him. The Toronto Star speculated that the illegal strike might have resulted from Moscoe's negotiations, while David Shiner and other councillors said that Moscoe had a history of interfering in management affairs. John Barber, a columnist for the rival The Globe and Mail, argued that Ducharme's resignation was not a reasonable response to Moscoe's alleged interference. Moscoe defended his actions, arguing that he had an obligation to take part in the discussions and was attempting to ensure that a second strike did not take place. He later said that management was to blame for the wildcat strike, and that he intervened in an attempt to stop it.

Ducharme also criticized Moscoe for granting a non-bid contract to Bombardier for the purchase of new subway cars, citing an estimate from rival company Siemens suggesting that it would cost Toronto as much as $100 million. Ducharme and several councillors had advocated making the process open to competition, arguing that this would result in the best deal for the city. Moscoe defended his decision by noting that Bombardier plans to construct the cars in Thunder Bay, Ontario with parts-supply work in Toronto, while Siemens would have exported construction to China. He also cited a Bombardier-initiated study asserting that the contract will generate $142 million in provincial and federal tax revenues. Moscoe also defended the contracting process, arguing that non-competitive contracts are standard practice for such purchases in other jurisdictions. He later added that he initially considered an open-bid contract, but reconsidered after discovering that Siemens constructs its cars in China.

Some councillors accused Moscoe of having an improper relationship with Bombardier, which had donated to Moscoe's campaign and sent out invitations to a political fundraiser for TTC Vice-chair Adam Giambrone, an ally of Moscoe, although he turned down the assistance. Moscoe had also taken part in a Bombardier-organized trip to Tel Aviv in 1998, to promote subway construction in Israel. Moscoe responded to the accusation by saying that he was the target of a smear campaign, noting that there had been "nothing secret" about his 1998 trip, which was funded by the Israeli government. He added that he had also received campaign contributions from Siemens. Moscoe said that his opponents were "trying to get to the mayor" by attacking him, and argued that the controversy was being fomented by Siemens and its lobbyists, who were in contact with a number of councillors critical of the non-bid contract.

In the aftermath of Ducharme's resignation, the Toronto Star newspaper and some city councillors called for Moscoe to stand down as TTC chair. He initially dismissed these calls as politically motivated, but later said that he was thinking about resigning after the 2006 municipal election. There was another attempt to remove Moscoe as TTC chair in July 2006, but he defeated the challenge by a vote of 5 to 3.

In late August 2006, an outside panel of experts judged that Bombardier's offer was a good deal for city, with one consultant saying that the proposed bid "is below most of the recent comparable North American procurements." In the aftermath of the report, councillor Glenn De Baeremaeker was quoted as saying, "if what you have told me [about the price] is true, somebody owes Howard Moscoe an apology". The TTC staff have also recommended finalizing a deal with Bombardier. Some councillors, such as Karen Stintz, have continued to oppose the contract on procedural grounds. Stintz has said, "it's not about Bombardier. It's about a process we didn't follow", noting that other city departments require competitive bids on contracts of this size.

The TTC unanimously endorsed purchase of the subway cars on August 30, 2006. After the vote, Moscoe told reporters, "We got a fair deal. We got a good deal. And we've got a first-class set of subway cars. [...] I have no apologies to make". The purchase was subsequently approved by council in late September 2006, by a vote of 25 to 18.

==== Late 2006 ====
Moscoe announced in late October 2006 that the TTC was considering the installment of electronic signs, to show bus and streetcar riders how long they would have to wait for the next vehicle. The following month, he announced that the TTC would introduce new tokens to combat counterfeiting. He also proposed shifting Toronto to an automatic train system to increase service capacity, and introducing a station master at each stop to handle upgrades and customer complaints.

One day after the 2006 municipal election, the federal government of Stephen Harper announced that it would provide the TTC with $1.4 million for anti-terrorism measures. Moscoe described the announcement as a "slap in the face", far below the $35 million the TTC had requested for security upgrades. He declined to participate in a photo opportunity with federal officials, and asked the Harper government to reconsider its proposal. Moscoe also rejected the Conservative government's suggestion that Toronto consider public-private partnerships for transit services, saying "In transit we call them public-pirate partnerships. All the experience has been bad."

In a surprise move, Moscoe declined to seek renomination as TTC chair after the 2006 election. He sought appointment to the Greater Toronto Transit Authority, a new regional body.

=== Taxis ===
Moscoe long promoted safety concerns in the taxi industry, and often championed the interests of taxi drivers against perceived exploitation from owners. He himself trained as a cab driver in 1990, in an effort to learn more about the industry. He once described taxi drivers as "the most vulnerable people in town" due to threats from belligerent passengers, and called for a Metro taskforce on driver safety after attending the funeral service of a cab driver killed by a customer in 1998. He later encouraged the installment of cameras in taxi cabs. The council adopted his suggestion and mandated security cameras in taxi cabs. As a result, the crime rate against cab drivers dropped by 70%.

He supported a pioneering unionization effort for Toronto cab drivers in 1993. He later spoke out against abuses in Toronto's taxi licensing system, drawing attention to cases in which wealthy owners purchased plates that were rented to drivers at exorbitant rates. In 1998, he collaborated with Denzil Minnan-Wong to pass reform legislation granting "Ambassador" plates for licence holders who drive their own cars.

Moscoe defended a taxi fare increase in 2003, arguing that it was first such increase in seven years and was necessary to cover rising insurance and gas prices. In 2005, he argued that drivers deserved a further fifty-cent increase per ride to cope with soaring fuel costs. He supported a motion to have all Toronto cabs painted the same colour, arguing that this measure will help crack down on illegal drivers.

Following the murder of a taxi driver by a passenger, Moscoe commented that drivers "live a very dangerous existence", adding "I would venture to say their job is more dangerous than a police officer". According to a Toronto Star report, some members of the police force found this comment offensive.

His 2006 appointment as chair of the Licensing and Standards Committee gave Moscoe direct authority over the city's taxi industry. He acknowledged that owners and brokers disapproved of some of his ideas, but said that most drivers supported him.

=== Police ===
Moscoe often called for reforms in the Toronto Police Service, particularly as regards the force's relations with racial minority groups. Following the 1990 shooting of a black teenager by Toronto police, he introduced a motion at the Federation of Canadian Municipalities calling for police officers to be trained with "the information they need to deal sensitively with racial and ethnic minorities". He was a founding member of Metro Toronto's Council Action Committee to Combat Racism but resigned in January 1991, saying that it had rendered itself ineffectual by declining to make police issues a priority. Metro Chairman Alan Tonks, who established the committee, argued that an emphasis on police issues would duplicate the work of the Metro Police Commission and reduce police morale. Moscoe sought an appointment to the Police Commission in late 1990, but withdrew his name after failing to win Tonks's support.

He criticized the tactics of the Toronto Police Association during Craig Bromell's tenure as union leader. In 1999, he argued that TTC advertisements by the union portrayed Hispanics as criminals. Bromell said that the ads were not meant to be offensive. The next year, Moscoe accused Bromell of having "crossed the line" by hiring private investigators to probe city councillors critical of the police force. Moscoe had his own office swept for bugs as a precautionary measure. Some councillors, including Tom Jakobek, derided this as a publicity stunt.

Moscoe described a 2004 proposal for police helicopters as "pure testosterone", and sarcastically suggested that the helicopters should be equipped with Sidewinder missiles to ensure maximum effectiveness. He said during a council debate, "Do we need a helicopter to track down drug dealers in Parkdale? It's tough to land a helicopter on a doughnut shop." Rival councillor Rob Ford said that Moscoe's comments were insulting to the police force. Some current and former members of the Toronto police, including Julian Fantino, have criticized Moscoe's approach to police affairs.

=== Taxation ===
Moscoe played a significant role in Metro Council's deliberations over market value tax reform in late 1992, working with three Progressive Conservative councillors to broker a last-minute compromise on the issue. Under the proposed plan, businesses and factories that paid rates below the market level would have had their rate increases capped at 25% over three years, while tenants and homeowners would have had increases capped at 10% over three years. Those paying more than the market rate would also have had their reductions capped. The compromise won the support of council, despite opposition from councillors representing wards in downtown Toronto. The provincial government later rejected the proposal. Moscoe supported a similar five-year phase-in plan in 1998, which was accepted.

== Retirement and illness ==
After retiring from politics, Moscoe applied to Osgoode Hall Law School. He wrote a book, Call Me Pisher: A Madcap Romp Through City Hall, about his political career and lectured on municipal government at Ryerson University, as well as continuing his sideline selling lawn signs to political candidates.

Moscoe told the National Post that he had bought a plot at Mount Sinai cemetery and had commissioned a gravestone shaped like Toronto City Hall with English on one tower and Hebrew on the other and considered engraving the monument with an email address, Howardmoscoe@heaven.org.

He suffered from a number of medical conditions in his last years but maintained his sense of humour. His grandson, Al Moscoe, told the Toronto Star that during one of his hospitalizations when he was being kept in a hallway bed, he put up a sign stating "I will end hallway medicine", mocking Ontario Premier Doug Ford's 2018 election promise.

== Death ==
Moscoe died at Hennick Humber Hospital on the morning of May 23, 2026, at the age of 86. On June 1, TTC Chair, Jamaal Myers moved a motion to have TTC staff recommend options for commemorating Moscoe's 14 years of service on the TTC board in various capacities.

== Electoral record ==
=== Municipal politics ===
2006 Toronto municipal election: Councillor, Ward Fifteen
Candidate	Votes	%
(x)Howard Moscoe	5,820	46.89
Ron Singer	3,110	25.06
Rosina Bonavota	1,897	15.28
Howard Cohen	675	5.44
Eva Tavares	477	3.84
Dino Stamatopoulos	311	2.51
Alex Papouchine	122	0.98
Total valid votes	12,412	100.00

2003 Toronto municipal election: Councillor, Ward Fifteen
Candidate	Votes	%
(x)Howard Moscoe	7,612	52.60
Luigi Rizzo	3,414	23.59
Rocco Piccininno	1,411	9.75
Ron Singer	1,196	8.26
Howard Mandel	536	3.70
Jhadira Ramos	302	2.09
Total valid votes	14,471	100.00

2000 Toronto municipal election: Councillor, Ward Fifteen
Candidate	Votes	%
(x)Howard Moscoe	8,611	57.70
Tony Rizzo	4,984	33.40
Jim McMillan	924	6.19
Jason Baker	405	2.71
Total valid votes	14,924	100.00

1997 Toronto municipal election: Councillor, Ward Eight (two members elected)
Candidate	Votes	%
(x)Howard Moscoe	16,187	35.74
(x)Mike Feldman	14,737	32.54
Frank Di Giorgio	11,487	25.36
Henry Braverman	1,572	3.47
Nickeisha Hudson	923	2.04
Roy Dzeko	383	0.85
Total valid votes	45,289	100.00

Electors could vote for two candidates.
The percentages are determined in relation to the total number of votes.

1994 Toronto municipal election: Metro Toronto Councillor, North York Spadina
Candidate	Votes	%
(x)Howard Moscoe	acclaimed	.

1991 Toronto municipal election: Metro Toronto Councillor, North York Spadina
Candidate	Votes	%
(x)Howard Moscoe	11,129	72.24
Tibor Martinek	2,589	16.81
Larry Wynne	1,687	10.95
Total valid votes	15,405	100.00

Results taken from the Toronto Star, November 13, 1991.
The final official results were not significantly different.

1988 Toronto municipal election: Metro Toronto Councillor, North York Spadina
Candidate	Votes	%
(x)Howard Moscoe	acclaimed	.

1985 Toronto municipal election: North York Board of Control (four members elected)
Candidate	Votes	%
(x)Esther Shiner	67,345	19.47
(x)Robert Yuill	53,709	15.53
Norman Gardner	51,137	14.78
Howard Moscoe	42,303	12.23
Mike Foster	35,838	10.36
Frank Esposito	21,365	6.18
Bruce Davidson	18,926	5.47
Sonnee Cohen	12,822	3.71
Bernadette Michael	12,764	3.69
Angelo Natale	12,416	3.59
Cora Urbel	7,791	2.25
Arthur Zins	4,961	1.43
Ayube Ally	4,571	1.32
Total valid votes	345,948	100.00

Results taken from The Globe and Mail, November 14, 1985.
Electors could vote for four candidates.
The percentages are determined in relation to the total number of votes.
The final official results were not significantly different.

1982 Toronto municipal election: North York Councillor, Ward Four
Candidate	Votes	%
(x)Howard Moscoe	4,000	46.44
Frank Di Giorgio	2,923	33.93
Eleanor Rosen	1,191	13.83
Sydney Moscoe	500	5.80
Total valid votes	8,614	100.00

73 out of 75 polls reporting.

Results taken from The Globe and Mail, November 9, 1982.
The final results confirmed Moscoe's victory.

1980 Toronto municipal election: North York Councillor, Ward Four
Candidate	Votes	%
(x)Howard Moscoe	4,320	66.99
Cary Fox	1,247	19.34
Gus Cusimano	882	13.68
Total valid votes	6,449	100.00

75 out of 78 polls reporting.

Results taken from the Toronto Star, November 11, 1980.
The final results were not significantly different.

1978 Toronto municipal election: North York Councillor, Ward Four
Candidate	Votes	%	Notes
Howard Moscoe	2,757	45.74	High school teacher
(x)Murray Markin	1,934	32.09	Incumbent
Eleanor Rosen	630	10.45	
Jean Lance	447	7.42	Tenant activist
Alan Mostyn	259	4.30	Lawyer
Total valid votes	6,027	100.00	

Results taken from the Toronto Star, November 14, 1978.
The final results confirmed Moscoe's victory.

1974 Toronto municipal election: North York Hydro Commission (two members elected)
Candidate	Votes	%
(x) John Dunn	29,240	21.14
(x) D'arcy McConvey	22,084	15.96
Carl Anderson	19,965	14.43
Leon Donsky	16,577	11.98
Howard Moscoe	14,575	10.54
Alec Davis	12,091	8.74
Bernard Birman	10,912	7.89
Peter Slattery	5,409	3.91
William Lynch	4,083	2.95
Jack Newton	3,407	2.46
Total valid votes	138,343	100.00

Results taken from the Toronto Star, December 3, 1974.
Electors could vote for two candidates.
The percentages are determined in relation to the total number of votes.
There may be a transcription error in the result for Carl Anderson (the last two numbers were partly obscured).
The final official results were not significantly different.

All municipal election information is from the City of Toronto, unless otherwise noted.

=== Provincial politics ===
1985 Ontario general election: Wilson Heights
Party	Candidate	Votes	%
Liberal	Monte Kwinter	12,363	40.76
Progressive Conservative	David Rotenberg	10,175	33.55
New Democratic	Howard Moscoe	7,793	25.69
Total valid votes		30,331	100.00
Rejected, unmarked and declined ballots		316	
Turnout		30,647	64.26
Electors on the lists		47,693	

1977 Ontario general election: Wilson Heights
Party	Candidate	Votes	%	±%	Expenditures
Progressive Conservative	David Rotenberg	11,430	41.97		$29,496
New Democratic	Howard Moscoe	8,437	30.98		$10,634
Liberal	Murray Markin	7,195	26.42		$14,894
Libertarian	Webster J. Webb	174	0.64		$0
Total valid votes		27,236	100.00		
Rejected, unmarked and declined ballots		307			
Turnout		27,543	62.93		
Electors on the lists		43,771			

1975 Ontario general election: Wilson Heights
Party	Candidate	Votes	%
Liberal	Vern Singer	11,379	42.26
Progressive Conservative	David Rotenberg	8,739	32.46
New Democratic	Howard Moscoe	6,441	23.92
Libertarian	George Dance	366	1.36
Total valid votes		26,925	100.00
Rejected, unmarked and declined ballots		294	
Turnout		27,219	61.95
Electors on the lists		43,935	

All provincial election information is from Elections Ontario.

== Honours ==
A small street in North York at York University Keele Campus leading to the new Pioneer Village subway station has been named Howard Moscoe Way.

In 2025, he was awarded the King Charles III Coronation Medal.
