= Joseph Markin =

Joe Markin

North York Controller
- In office 1974–1976 Serving with Barbara Greene, Bill Sutherland, Alex McGivern

Personal details
- Born: 1948
- Died: February 26, 2017 (aged 68) Toronto, Ontario
- Profession: Businessman, lawyer

Joseph (Joe) Markin (c. 1948 - February 26, 2017) was a lawyer and politician in Toronto, Ontario, Canada. He served on North York's Board of Control from 1974 to 1976.

== Political career ==
Markin was elected to the North York Board of Control in his first bid for public office, in the 1974 municipal election. He campaigned on a platform of campaign finance reform, calling for a $10,000 spending limit and a full disclosure of sources before an election. Markin indicated that his own expenses would be limited to $5,000. He was twenty-seven years old.

Markin's election to the Board of Control gave him an automatic seat on the Metropolitan Toronto council. He emerged as an opponent of downtown Toronto councillor John Sewell, and in 1975 advocated that Metro Council assume direct control of the city's downtown area. He later brought forward a censure motion against Sewell for having said that Metro Parks Commissioner Tommy Thompson deliberately misled council.

Markin called for a reform of North York's election laws in 1975, to permit the senior controller to take over as mayor if the incumbent leaves office in mid-term. He acknowledged to reporters that he held mayoral ambitions himself, but added that he would not seek the position as long as it was held by Mel Lastman, a personal friend.

Markin obtained some national notoriety in late 1976 for speaking out against the federal government's decision to adopt the metric system.

Markin's promising political career came to an unexpected end in late 1976. He attended only one North York council meeting in the second half of the year, and left the city in November to take rabbinical studies in New York. He did not seek re-election in the 1976 campaign. He later ran for a seat on the North York Hydro Commission in 1980, but was unsuccessful.

His brother, Murray Markin, was a North York city councillor from 1976 to 1978.

== Legal career ==
Markin oversaw several high-profile legal cases.

In February 1989, he represented a disbarred Toronto lawyer in a $2.6 million lawsuit against provincial Attorney General Ian Scott. The lawyer in question had hired Scott as his representative in a disciplinary case six years earlier, and later accused Scott of negligence when the result led to his disbarment. The suit received extensive media coverage before being dismissed by a jury. In 1995, Markin represented a teacher who claimed he was discriminated against by the Toronto Separate (ie. Roman Catholic) School Board, because he himself was not a Catholic. In 2001, he represented Toronto Transit Commission workers who argued that they were exposed to asbestos dust while rebuilding the Sheppard subway station.

He represented Salim Damji in a major fraud case in 2002, and oversaw Damji's plea of guilty to the charges against him. Damji had stolen money from over eight hundred members from Canada's Ismaili community by selling shares for a bogus teeth-whitening invention. Markin appealed for a light sentence, arguing that Damji had been put up to the scheme by figures involved in organized crime.

== Other ==
Markin opened Le Karem kosher wine store in 1986, selling eight types of wine made in accordance with Talmudic principles. The wines were produced under the auspices of Paul Bosc at Niagara's Chateau des Charmes, and received favourable reviews from the Toronto media. He died on February 26, 2017.
