= Esther Shiner =

Canadian politician (1924–1987)

Esther Shiner (February 12, 1924 – December 19, 1987) was a Canadian municipal politician in Toronto, Ontario. She served on the North York city council from 1973 until her death, and was also a member of the Metropolitan Toronto council. She served as North York's Deputy Mayor in the 1980s.

== Early life and career ==
Shiner's parents were Jewish refugees from Poland. She graduated from Harbord Collegiate and completed a BSc at the University of Toronto. She married Sol Shiner in 1947 and together they had four children. Her husband operated a fur-cleaning and storage business. Shiner was an active Zionist, and was a member of Hadassah in her youth.

== Municipal politician ==
Shiner was elected as an alderman for North York's fourth ward in the 1972 municipal election. Her primary cause was the Spadina Expressway, which she wanted to extend as far as downtown Toronto. Shiner fought several battles with Premier Bill Davis on this issue, and unsuccessfully tried to have a city-wide plebiscite on extension in 1985. The expressway was partly extended in the 1970s, but Davis blocked any further extensions.

Shiner was elected to the North York Board of Control in 1976, and remained a member until her death. The position gave her an automatic seat on the Metropolitan Toronto Council. She served on Metro's transportation committee for several years, and was a frequent rival to fellow councillor Anne Johnston.

As a member of the transportation committee, Shiner criticized the Toronto Transit Commission's new streetcars in the early 1980s, arguing that people could become caught underneath the front. The TTC yielded to her demands, and introduced a protective barrier in 1984. The barrier was nicknamed as the "Shiner Skirt".

She was also appointed to the management board of the O'Keefe Centre for the Performing Arts in 1979, and remained a board member until 1986. Shiner supported the principle of amalgamation for Toronto's six municipal governments in 1978, on the grounds that it would yield a better transportation system.

In 1982, she helped convince North York City Council to name a street after Swedish diplomat Raoul Wallenburg, who is credited with saving the lives of over 100,000 Hungarian Jews in World War II.

Shiner held what were considered conservative views on several issues. She opposed councillor Howard Moscoe's plan for campaign donation limits in 1984, arguing that it would be unworkable. She also criticized an affirmative action plan for North York employees, and suggested that a housing task force for the city could become an expensive waste of time.

Shiner considered challenging Mel Lastman for Mayor of North York in 1985, but declined.

== Death and legacy ==
Esther Shiner died in December 1987, at age 63.

The North York City Council held a moment of silence in her honour in January 1988, and the civic square carillons played "Moon River" and "Somewhere Over The Rainbow", two of her favourite songs.

She was interred at Pardes Shalom Cemetery in Maple, Ontario. Later in the year, the North York Civic Stadium in the Bathurst and Finch area was renamed the Esther Shiner Stadium.

Her son, David Shiner, was a municipal politician in Toronto prior to the 2018 Toronto municipal election. A street in the Sheppard Avenue and Leslie Street area is named Esther Shiner Blvd. in her honour.

== Sources ==
- "Esther Shiner: North York politician earned wide respect", The Globe and Mail, December 21, 1987, p. A19.

== Electoral record ==
North York Board of Control, 1985 Toronto election (top four candidates elected)
Candidate	Total votes	% of total votes
(x)Esther Shiner	67,345	19.47
(x)Robert Yuill	53,709	15.53
Norman Gardner	51,137	14.78
Howard Moscoe	42,303	12.23
Mike Foster	35,838	10.36
Frank Esposito	21,365	6.18
Bruce Davidson	18,926	5.47
Sonnee Cohen	12,822	3.71
Bernadette Michael	12,764	3.69
Angelo Natale	12,416	3.59
Cora Urbel	7,791	2.25
Arthur Zins	4,961	1.43
Ayube Ally	4,571	1.32
Total valid votes	345,948	100.00

Results taken from The Globe and Mail, 14 November 1985. The final results were not significantly different.
Electors could vote for four candidates. The percentages are determined in relation to the total number of votes.

North York Board of Control, 1982 Toronto election (top four candidates elected) (1,311 of 1,329 polls reporting)
Candidate	Total votes	% of total votes
(x)Esther Shiner	67,673	19.56
Barbara Greene	57,948	16.75
(x)Robert Yuill	50,688	14.65
(x)Bill Sutherland	50,134	14.49
(x)Norman Gardner	46,898	13.56
Frank Esposito	19,818	5.73
Tony D'Amato	16,629	4.81
Bernadette Michael	12,746	3.68
Sonnee Cohen	12,532	3.62
Agostino Settecase	5,799	1.68
Richard Kirkup	5,051	1.46
Total valid votes	345,916	100.00

Results taken from The Globe and Mail, 9 November 1982.
The final results confirmed the election of Shiner, Greene, Yuill and Sutherland.
Electors could vote for four candidates. The percentages are determined in relation to the total number of votes.

North York Board of Control, 1980 Toronto election (top four candidates elected) (1,257 of 1,379 polls reporting)
Candidate	Total votes	% of total votes
(x)Esther Shiner	55,986	19.90
(x)Robert Yuill	44,544	15.83
Bill Sutherland	36,562	12.99
Norman Gardner	36,402	12.94
(x)Irving Paisley	35,590	12.65
Jan McGivern	25,934	9.22
Frank Esposito	17,643	6.27
Donna Wilson	17,104	6.08
Bernadette Michael	11,604	4.12
Total valid votes	281,369	100.00

Results taken from the Toronto Star, 11 November 1980.
The final results confirmed the election of Shiner, Yuill, Sutherland and Gardner.
Electors could vote for four candidates. The percentages are determined in relation to the total number of votes.

North York Board of Control, 1978 Toronto election (top four candidates elected) (1,239 of 1,346 polls reporting)
Candidate	Total votes	% of total votes
(x)Barbara Greene	57,808	18.13
(x)Esther Shiner	55,429	17.39
(x)Robert Yuill	44,748	14.04
Irving Paisley	34,648	10.87
(x)Ron Summers	34,514	10.83
Alex McGivern	33,602	10.54
Harvey Haber	18,228	5.72
Paul Wizman	14,221	4.46
Doreen Leitch	9,791	3.07
Gino Vatri	9,729	3.05
Sheena Suttaby	6,049	1.90
Total valid votes	318,767	100.00

Results taken from the Toronto Star, 14 November 1978.
The final results confirmed the election of Greene, Shiner, Yuill and Paisley.
Electors could vote for four candidates. The percentages are determined in relation to the total number of votes.

North York Board of Control, 1976 Toronto election (top four candidates elected) (1,173 of 1,305 polls reporting)
Candidate	Total votes	% of total votes
(x)Barbara Greene	62,918	22.60
Esther Shiner	48,441	17.40
Ron Summers	39,857	14.31
Robert Yuill	37,558	13.49
(x)Alex McGivern	36,525	13.12
Jack Bedder	24,706	8.87
Bernadette Michael	16,398	5.89
Angelo Natale	12,048	4.33
Total valid votes	278,451	100.00

Results taken from the Toronto Star, 6 December 1976.
The final results confirmed the election of Greene, Shiner, Summers and Yuill.
Electors could vote for four candidates. The percentages are determined in relation to the total number of votes.

North York City Council, Ward Four, 1974 Toronto election
Candidate	Total votes	% of total votes
(x)Esther Shiner	4,047	76.20
Malcolm O'Heir	544	10.24
Domenico Natale	407	7.67
Marvin Silverberg	313	5.89
Total valid votes	5,311	100.00

Results taken from the Toronto Star, 3 December 1974.
The final official results were not significantly different.

North York City Council, Ward Four, 1972 Toronto election (46 of 64 wards reporting)
Candidate	Total votes	% of total votes
Esther Shiner	1,559	32.38
David Perry	1,732	35.97
Irving Goldberg	775	16.10
Frank Granieri	363	7.54
Samuel Wagman	194	4.03
Max Gellman	192	3.99
Total valid votes	4,815	100.00

Results taken from the Toronto Star, 5 December 1972.
These results obviously do not reflect the final totals. Shiner pulled ahead of Perry when the final eighteen polls were counted, and was listed in the next day's Star as winning by twelve votes, 2,326 to 2,314.
