= Mike Foster (Canadian politician) =

Michael Foster is a former municipal politician in Toronto, Ontario, Canada. He was an alderman in the Metro Toronto municipality of North York from 1978 to 1985, and later campaigned for Mayor of North York in 1988. He has also sought election to the Legislative Assembly of Ontario. Foster is a member of the New Democratic Party (NDP).

== Early life and career ==
Foster studying political science at York University. Before entering political life, he worked in community service, produced a television problem on community affairs, and was the administrator of a legal aid clinic. In June 1978, he was listed as a worker at Etobicoke's Welfare Action Centre.

== North York councillor ==
Foster was first elected to North York's city council in 1978 with a narrow victory over the incumbent alderman, Marilyn Meshburg, who had defeated him in his first attempt two years earlier. Foster's challenge of Meshburg was somewhat unusual, in that both candidates were progressives on labour issues and other matters. Meshburg was supported by the Metro Reform citizens' group, while Foster was backed by the municipal wing of the NDP and the Metro Labour Council. He was 24 years old at the time of the election.

Following his election, Foster sought to remove a legal loophole which allowed oil companies to pay lower taxes by classifying their property as farmland. In 1984, he called on the provincial government to forbid companies from charging user fees for Workers Compensation Board cases. Along with Howard Moscoe and Barbara Greene, Foster was considered a leading voice for reform on the council and frequently criticized the development policies of Mayor Mel Lastman.

He remained an alderman until 1985, when he unsuccessfully sought election to the city's Board of Control. He also campaigned for the Ontario legislature in the 1985 provincial election as an Ontario New Democratic Party candidate and finished second in Yorkview against Claudio Polsinelli. During his provincial campaign, Foster called for tenant protection, job creation and comprehensive workers compensation reforms.

== Since 1985 ==
After leaving North York council, Foster became a partner in Union Communications, an advertising and communications agency that specializes in progressive issues. He also worked as a Toronto Star columnist for two years, writing on political issues. In a 1986 article, he called on North York to adopt progressive housing policies. Foster also wrote in support of employment equity and pay equity policies, and on tax and transportation issues.

Foster challenged Mel Lastman for mayor of North York in 1988, but lost by a considerable margin. A fellow New Democrat, Howard Moscoe, argued that his campaign was poorly timed and Foster later acknowledged that it had been "a longshot".

Anthony Perruzza attempted to have Foster appointed as his replacement on the North York City council in 1990, following Perruzza's election to the Legislative Assembly of Ontario, but this plan came to nothing. Foster was awarded a Seneca College Distinguished Alumni Award in 2005 and remains active with Union Communications.

== Electoral record ==
1988 North York mayoral election

- x-Mel Lastman 98,856
- Mike Foster 13,486
- Douglas Campbell 10,290
- Freddie Jay 1,939

North York Board of Control, 1985 Toronto election (top four candidates elected)
Candidate	Total votes	% of total votes
(x)Esther Shiner	67,345	19.47
(x)Robert Yuill	53,709	15.53
Norman Gardner	51,137	14.78
Howard Moscoe	42,303	12.23
Mike Foster	35,838	10.36
Frank Esposito	21,365	6.18
Bruce Davidson	18,926	5.47
Sonnee Cohen	12,822	3.71
Bernadette Michael	12,764	3.69
Angelo Natale	12,416	3.59
Cora Urbel	7,791	2.25
Arthur Zins	4,961	1.43
Ayube Ally	4,571	1.32
Total valid votes	345,948	100.00

1985 Ontario general election, Yorkview
Party	Candidate	Votes	Vote %
Liberal	Claudio Polsinelli	15,959	49.7
New Democrat	Mike Foster	12,651	39.4
Progressive Conservative	Leslie Soobrian	3,514	10.9
	Total	32,124	

1978 North York municipal election, Ward 5
Michael Foster - 3,877
(incumbent)Marilyn Meshberg - 3,620
Amerigo Petruzzo - 1,430
Judy Taylor - 594
