= Norm Gardner =

Canadian politician (born 1938)

Chair of the Toronto Police Services Board
- In office 1998–2004
- Preceded by: Maureen Prinsloo
- Succeeded by: Alan Heisey

Toronto City Councillor for (Ward 10) North York Centre
- In office January 1, 1998 – December 1, 2000 Serving with John Filion
- Preceded by: Ward created
- Succeeded by: Ward abolished

Metro Toronto Councillor, North York Centre Ward
- In office December 1, 1988 – December 31, 1997
- Preceded by: Ward established
- Succeeded by: City amalgamated

North York City Controller and Metro Toronto Councillor
- In office 1985–1988 Serving with Robert Yuill, Howard Moscoe, Esther Shiner (1985-87) and Mario Gentile (1988)
- Preceded by: Esther Shiner, Barbara Greene, Robert Yuill and William Sutherland
- Succeeded by: Position eliminated
- In office 1980–1982 Serving with Esther Shiner, Robert Yuill, William Sutherland
- Preceded by: Barbara Greene, Esther Shiner, Robert Yuill, Irving Paisley
- Succeeded by: Esther Shiner, Barbara Greene, Robert Yuill, William Sutherland

North York Alderman, Ward Nine
- In office 1976–1980

Personal details
- Born: February 13, 1938 (age 88)
- Occupation: Businessman

Norman "Norm" Gardner (born February 13, 1938) is a politician and administrator in Toronto, Ontario, Canada. He is a former North York and Toronto City Councillor, serving most recently as chair of the Toronto Police Services Board (1998–2003). He was subsequently chair of the board of the Mackenzie Institute for several years.

== Private life and career ==
Gardner served ten years in the Canadian Forces, and was a member of The Queen's Own Rifles of Canada, a Primary Reserve unit.

He has been the regional manager for a pharmaceutical company. He owns Toronto's Steeles Bakery, and often brought doughnuts, bagels and other baked goods from his store to distribute at council meetings in the 1980s and 1990s. He was president of the provincial Armourdale Liberal Association in 1974, and served on the Labour Committee of the Ontario Liberal Party in the same period.

== North York councillor ==
=== Ward councillor ===
Gardner was first elected to the North York city council in 1976, following two unsuccessful attempts. He was re-elected as an alderman in 1978, and was selected as one of the city's representatives on the Metro Toronto council in December of the same year. He soon became a reliable ally of Metro Chair Paul Godfrey. Gardner won the support of local Progressive Conservatives in his municipal campaigns, and left the Liberals to take out a Progressive Conservative Party of Ontario membership in 1980.

He supported Canada's boycott of the 1980 Summer Olympics in Moscow as a protest against the Soviet Union's invasion of Afghanistan. He also recommended that Canada consider banning Soviet vessels from its trading ports.

=== Controller ===
Gardner was elected to the North York Board of Control in 1980, a position that gave him an automatic seat on the Metro Council. He supported grants to community groups in the 1980 campaign to alleviate social problems, and was described in a The Globe and Mail editorial as a possible voice of progressive reform. He was narrowly defeated in 1982, but returned to the Board of Control in 1985. His supporters in the 1985 election included former Toronto Mayor John Sewell, who said that Gardner's election would add "continuity, restraint and attention to administrative detail" to the Board of Control.

An avid gun collector in private life, Gardner served on the federal firearms advisory council after his defeat. He argued against tighter restrictions on gun ownership, saying "We're not the people who commit crime. Why make it tougher for somebody who is looking after his collection in a responsible manner?"

Gardner ran for the Metro Toronto Police Commission after his 1985 re-election, losing on his first bid to Toronto Mayor Art Eggleton in a Metro Council vote. Gardner again contested the seat following Eggleton's resignation in 1986 and defeated Jack Layton, his only challenger, by a vote of thirty-two to six.

Shortly after his appointment to the Police Commission, the Toronto Star newspaper quoted him as saying that store owners should arm themselves against robbers. Gardner said he was misquoted, and that he had been talking about the response of store owners in Calgary and Montreal to recent shootings in those cities. The Star refused to retract its story. Some councillors suggested that Gardner be recalled from the commission, but no action was taken.

Gardner tried to discourage complaints against police officers for car chases in crowded urban areas. Critics argued that such chases put pedestrians at risk. Gardner warned that cars could become sanctuaries for criminals if the police discontinued such chases.

Gardner was generally on the right wing of the North York council, although he took progressive positions on some issues. He endorsed a proposal to create co-operative housing for low-income families in the city, and later supported a five-year grant to a paper recycling firm. He also opposed plans for Sunday shopping extensions in the late 1980s.

=== Provincial campaign ===
He rejoined the Ontario Liberal Party in early 1987, and sought the party's nomination for Willowdale in the 1987 provincial election. He said that his previous membership in the Progressive Conservative Party was "a good vehicle to use in the interests of my constituents", but added that he did not renew his membership in 1986. He also said that Liberal Premier David Peterson had "done a good job" in office. Gardner lost the nomination to Gino Matrundola.

== Metro Toronto councillor (full-time) ==
=== First term ===
Metro Toronto's system of government was changed in 1988, with the abolition of municipal control boards and the introduction of direct elections to Metro Council. Gardner was elected without opposition for the North York Centre ward. He supported Alan Tonks over Dennis Flynn for the position of Metro Chair, and was subsequently appointed to Metro's executive committee and re-appointed to the police commission. Gardner frequently defended Metro police officers against accusations of racism, and was sometimes described as resisting efforts towards police reform.

In early 1989, Gardner controversially recommended that the maximum age covered by the Young Offenders Act be lowered from 17 to 12. In 1991, he recommended a five-year minimum prison sentence without parole for criminals who use firearms in the commission of an offense.

In January 1991, Gardner appeared before a House of Commons committee examining gun control legislation. The Toronto Star quoted him as telling the committee that "foreigners and illegal immigrants" were responsible for most illegal guns coming into the city. Another media report indicates that Gardner identified "Jamaican posses and Asian crime gangs" as being responsible for most of Toronto's illegal weapons. Reformist police commissioner Susan Eng requested that Gardner resign in light of these comments. He refused, stating that he had been misquoted. Gardner later opposed Eng's appointment as chair of the Police Services Board.

In late 1991, Gardner argued that attempts by the federal government to toughen gun controls would not make anyone in Metro Toronto safer.

=== Second term ===
Gardner was re-elected to council in 1991, was subsequently returned to the Police Services Board. In February 1992, he opposed a plan to allow civilian investigations to precede internal police probes into shootings by officers.

In March 1992, Gardner shot and wounded a man who was attempting to rob his bakery. It was later revealed that Gardner had a special "protection-of-life" permit that allowed him to carry a loaded weapon. He later said that he received this permit following a death threat, an assertion that commission chair Susan Eng questioned. Eng called for him to resign pending an investigation, and councillor Brian Ashton suggested that Gardner should have been criminally charged to prevent Toronto shopkeepers from arming themselves and taking vigilante actions against criminals. Gardner denied that his actions constituted vigilantism, saying that the robber (who was unarmed) ran toward him yelling "Go ahead and shoot". The police declined to lay charges.

Gardner was a staunch supporter of the police administration during his tenure as a commissioner. In May 1992, Gardner was the only member of the Police Services Board to vote against restrictions on the use of firearms by police officers. Later in the year, he supported a protest by the Metropolitan Toronto Police Association against a new provincial law that required officers to file a written report after drawing their guns. Gardner also defended police use of pepper spray, stating that it prevented numerous injuries. In June 1994, he was the only police service board member to oppose a ban on the private ownership and possession of handguns.

Gardner stepped down from the Police Service Board in November 1992, having reached the maximum of six years. Brian Ashton was chosen as his replacement. Shortly after leaving the board, Gardner called for the creation of a special hate crimes unit in Metro Toronto to target neo-Nazis and other racists.

Gardner was approached by the Reform Party of Canada to campaign in the 1993 federal election, but declined. He instead announced that he would seek the Liberal Party of Canada's nomination in Markham—Whitchurch—Stouffville. He campaigned in favour of tax breaks for corporations, and his nomination was supported by Canadian Handgun magazine, which featured him on its front cover. Gardner appears to have dropped out of the nomination contest before a vote was held.

He was re-elected to the Police Services Board in November 1993, defeating fellow councillor Dennis Flynn by a vote of 17 to 16.

=== Third term ===
Gardner was re-elected to the Metro Council without opposition in 1994. He sought reappointment to the Police Services Board after the election, but unexpectedly lost to Brian Ashton. Ashton resigned his commission seat in May 1996, however, and Gardner was elected as his replacement.

In 1996, he supported a plan to fingerprint provincial welfare recipients.

=== Federal campaign ===
Gardner left the Liberals to join the Progressive Conservatives a second time during the mid-1990s. He was the federal PC candidate in Willowdale for the 1997 federal election, and lost to Liberal incumbent Jim Peterson by 17,000 votes.

== Toronto city councillor ==
He was elected to Toronto city council in 1997, the first election for the new amalgamated municipality under the City of Toronto Act. Each ward elected two councillors in that election, and Gardner finished second, 2,000 votes behind John Filion, a former school trustee making his first bid for city council. He supported Mel Lastman's bid to become mayor of the amalgamated city.

In early 1998, Gardner unseated Maureen Prinsloo as chair of the Toronto Police Services Board. He was supported by those board members appointed by the provincial Progressive Conservative government of Mike Harris, as well as Mayor Mel Lastman and his supporters. The right-wing Toronto Sun praised him as "pro-police", while the centre-left Toronto Star argued that he had developed a "reputation as an apologist for police".

In June 1998, Gardner supported a comprehensive overhaul of the police service's administrative structure. He also supported a plan by Police Chief David Boothby to replace the city's public complaints bureau with a more decentralized model. The following month, he concluded a deal to make Toronto police officers the highest-paid in Ontario—higher pay would help Metro retain skilled officers by offering competitive compensation.

In the summer of 1998, an Ontario judge ruled that the Toronto police were negligent in using an unidentified woman as "bait" to catch the so-called Balcony Rapist (the woman was not informed that the rapist lived in her area, and was sexually assaulted). Gardner initially said that he had difficulty believing the police were negligent, and remarked that some women lie about being raped. He later apologized for his comments, and offered an official apology to the unidentified woman.

Gardner supported the purchase of police helicopters in 1999 to provide the police additional tools to fight crime, an initiative that some other councillors criticized as both ineffective and too expensive. He also recommended charging each business in Toronto a $15 fee to cover the costs of policing, an initiative that was quickly rejected by Mel Lastman.

Gardner was a frequent rival of fellow commissioner Judy Sgro. Sgro left the Police Services Board in 1999, after complaining of intimidation from the Toronto police union. On one occasion, Gardner was accused of allowing police union officials to harass and intimidate Sgro at an informal board meeting. He denied that harassment occurred.

Gardner and Fantino opposed the police union's controversial "Operation True Blue" telemarketing campaign in early 2000 and forced it to cease. The Toronto Star alleged that Gardner had made a secret deal with police union leader Craig Bromell to permit similar fundraising efforts in the future. Gardner denied that a deal had been struck, and maintained that he consistently opposed the True Blue campaign.

== Provincial appointee ==
The method of election for city councillors changed with the 2000 election with a return to a one councillor per ward system. Facing a tough battle against Filion, Gardner opted to retire from politics. With the support of Lastman and Toronto Police Association president Craig Bromell, the Harris government agreed to appoint Gardner to one of the provincially appointed seats on the board allowing him to continue as Police Services Board chairman without having a city council seat. He was reappointed by the province to serve a full three-year term in September 2001.

In October 2001, Gardner supported a decision by the Toronto police to compile a list of suspected terrorist sympathizers. During a radio interview on the subject, he said that he was "assuming that people on this list are predominantly of Middle Eastern descent". Both Gardner's comments and his support for the list were criticized by civil libertarians, including lawyer Clayton Ruby. Provincial Solicitor General David Turnbull defended both Gardner's comments and the police decision.

Gardner supported a race relations probe in late 2002, following media reports that the Toronto police engaged in systemic discrimination against blacks. He denied that racial profiling existed, but acknowledged that there was an understandable rationale behind the complaints. He later criticized the Toronto Star for running a series of articles on racial profiling, arguing that they hindered the ability of police officers to do their job.

Gardner stepped aside as Police Services Board chair in 2003 after it was discovered that he had accepted the gift of a handgun from the vice-president of Para-Ordinance Inc., a Toronto firearms manufacturer that Gardner assisted in getting a discount rate for an exhibition booth at the 2001 International Association of Chiefs of Police convention. Gardner reimbursed the manufacturer $700 for the weapon, a restricted semi-automatic pistol, shortly before the controversy was made public. The initial six-week investigation by the Ontario Civilian Commission on Police Services (OCCOPS) resulted in a formal inquiry later in the year. It was later revealed that Gardner also took 5,700 rounds of ammunition from the city's police services for his personal use, with the permission of the chief's office. In 2004, it was revealed that Gardner had approved his own expenses for conference travel.

Gardner was replaced as Police Services Board chair in January 2004 by Alan Heisey. In April, the OCCOPS inquiry ruled that Gardner came "a hair short" of misconduct in his acceptance of the handgun, but also ruled that his decision to accept free ammunition brought discredit to the board. He was suspended without pay from the board until the end of his term in December 2004. Gardner argued that he did nothing wrong, and appealed the decision. He also refused to resign his commission seat for several months, a decision that left the board deadlocked between conservatives and progressives. This division contributed, in part, to the controversial non-renewal of Chief Julian Fantino's contract.

An Ontario Court of Appeals decision later overturned Gardner's suspension on technical grounds, while offering no opinion on whether or not he had violated policy. Gardner publicly stated that the decision cleared his name, and announced his resignation from the Police Services Board on November 1, 2004, one month before his term was complete, stating that his reputation was intact.

== 2007 provincial election ==
Gardner announced that he would seek the Progressive Conservative nomination in the Greater Toronto Area riding of Thornhill for the 2007 provincial election but, following pressure from the party leadership, agreed to withdraw in favour of CFRB talk show host Peter Shurman. Gardner told the Toronto Star that he would support Shurman in the general election because he's a "team player" but expressed his personal disappointment saying "I'm not jumping for joy, let's put it that way."

== 2014 Toronto mayoral election ==
On January 30, 2014, Gardner registered as a candidate in Toronto's fall 2014 mayoral election. His campaign received little attention; he was never considered a major candidate, did not register in opinion polls and was not invited to participate in mayoral debates. Gardner withdrew his candidacy on September 4, 2014.

== 2018 municipal election ==
On June 27, 2018, at the age of 80, Gardner filed to run in the 2018 municipal election for Toronto City Council in Ward 28, which covers the neighbourhood of Willowdale that he represented in the past. Gardner was active opposing a proposal to restructure the stretch of Yonge Street between Finch and Sheppard Avenue by making it more pedestrian friendly by widening sidewalks and introducing bicycle lanes, arguing that the changes would cause traffic congestion.

Gardner failed in his attempt to return to city council, receiving just over 5% of the vote, coming in sixth place.

== Electoral record ==
2018 Toronto election, Ward 18 - Willowdale
Candidate	Votes	%
John Filion	8,104	31.06%
Lily Cheng	5,149	19.74%
Sonny Cho	3,130	12.00%
David Mousavi	1,596	6.12%
Danny DeSantis	1,486	5.70%
Norman Gardner	1,476	5.67%
Sam Moini	1,289	4.94%
Saman Tabasi Nejad	1,189	4.56%
Winston Park	593	2.27%
Gerald Mak	545	2.09%
David Epstein	538	2.06%
Albert Kim	291	1.12%
Farah Aslani	187	0.72%
Andrew Herbst	162	0.62%
Hamid Shakeri	122	0.47%
Chung Jin Park	101	0.39%
Sam Mathi	66	0.25%
Marvin Honickman	61	0.23%

1997 Toronto election, Ward 10 - North York Centre
Candidate	Votes	%
John Filion	17,533	39.96%
Norman Gardner	15,135	34.49%
Ron Summers	11,212	25.55%

1997 Canadian federal election: Willowdale
Party	Candidate	Votes	%	±%
Liberal	Jim Peterson	27,311	58.3	-2.8
Progressive Conservative	Norm Gardner	10,043	21.4	+4.8
Reform	Peter Cobbold	6,007	12.8	-2.4
New Democratic	Mikael Swayze	2,833	6.0	+2.4
Natural Law	Don Murray	268	0.6	0.0
Independent	Paul Coulbeck	266	0.6	
Canadian Action	Randall Whitcomb	128	0.3	
Total valid votes		46,856	100.0	

=== Metro Councillor ===
1994- North York Centre

- Norman Gardner (incumbent) - acclaimed

1991- North York Centre

- Norman Gardner (incumbent) - 12,119
- Jeffrey Smith - 3,028

1988- North York Centre

- Norman Gardner (incumbent) - acclaimed

=== North York Council ===
1985 Toronto municipal election: North York Board of Control (four members elected)
Candidate	Votes	%
(x)Esther Shiner	67,345	19.47
(x)Robert Yuill	53,709	15.53
Norman Gardner	51,137	14.78
Howard Moscoe	42,303	12.23
Mike Foster	35,838	10.36
Frank Esposito	21,365	6.18
Bruce Davidson	18,926	5.47
Sonnee Cohen	12,822	3.71
Bernadette Michael	12,764	3.69
Angelo Natale	12,416	3.59
Cora Urbel	7,791	2.25
Arthur Zins	4,961	1.43
Ayube Ally	4,571	1.32
Total valid votes	345,948	100.00

1982 Board of Control

- (x)Esther Shiner
- Barbara Greene
- (x)Robert Yuill
- (x)William Sutherland
- (x)Norm Gardner
- Frank Esposito
- Tony D'amato
- Bernadette Michael
- Sonnee Cohen
- Agostino Settecase
- Richard Kirkup

1980 Board of Control

- (x)Esther Shiner 55,986
- (x)Robert Yuill 44,544
- William Sutherland 36,562
- Norm Gardner 36,402
- (x)Irv Paisley 35,590
- Jane McGivern 29,934
- Frank Esposito 17,643
- Donna Wilson 17,104
- Bernadette Michael 11,604

(1257 of 1379 polls)

1978 Ward 9 Alderman
(x)Norman Gardner - 5,914
Morry Smith - 3,526

1976 Ward 9 Alderman
(x)Norm Gardner - 1,985
Stanley - 1,251
Libman - 942
Nelson - 895
Tu - 818
Clarke - 691
Pagniello - 494
Kelly - 292
Similas - 142

(77 out of 93 polls)
