= Alan Heisey =

Canadian Lawyer

Alan M. Heisey
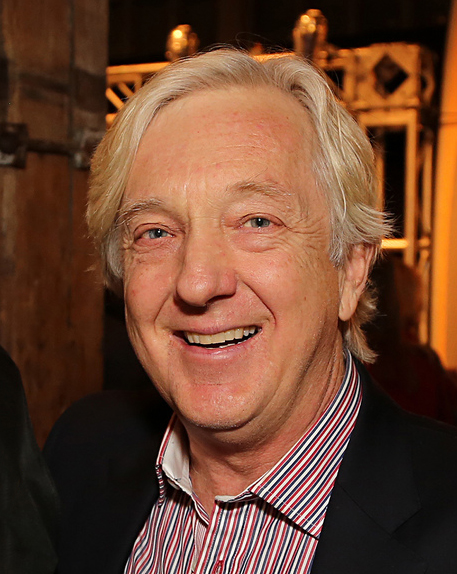
- Heisey in 2013
- Born: Alan Milliken Heisey II; 1954 (age 71–72); Don Mills, Ontario, Canada
- Occupation: Lawyer
- Known for: Chair of Toronto Police Services Board (2004) and vice-chair of the TTC Board (2015–2019)
- Children: 4
- Parent(s): Alan Milliken Heisey Sr. Barbara Muriel Cornes
- Relatives: Karl Heisey Sr. (grandfather); Lawrence Heisey (uncle)

Alan Milliken Heisey II, KC (born c. 1954) is a Canadian lawyer who was a member of the Toronto Transit Commission Board from 2012 to 2020 and served as its vice-chair from 2015 to 2019. Previously, he was chair of the Toronto Police Services Board in 2004 when it voted not to renew the contract of Toronto Police Chief Julian Fantino.

== Early life and career ==
Heisey was born in 1954 in Don Mills, Ontario, a suburb of Toronto. His father, Alan Milliken Heisey Sr., was a North York alderman from 1976 to 1980 and grandson of Karl Brooks Heisey.

He graduated from Osgoode Hall Law School in 1978 and joined the firm of Blake, Cassels & Graydon in 1981. Since 1985, he has been a partner in the law firm of Papazian Heisey Myers.

He was appointed a federal Queen's Counsel in 1993.

== Public service ==
Heisey was a member and then chair of the Toronto Parking Authority from 1992 to 2001. He oversaw the introduction of the world's first wireless, solar-powered pay-and-display consoles that accept credit cards on Toronto streets. Toronto was the first North American city to replace its parking meters with pay and display machines. After removal of the meters, the remaining posts had bicycle parking rings installed on them, significantly increasing the supply of bicycle parking.

He was retained by the City of Toronto government to represent the environmental group 'Save the Rouge' in the Oak Ridges Moraine Ontario Municipal Board hearing in 2000–2001. The hearing was stopped by the passage of the Oak Ridges Moraine Conservation Act in 2001, which preserved the Moraine from development.

=== Toronto Police Services Board ===
Heisey was appointed by City Council to the Toronto Police Services Board for the period from March 2001 to October 2004, and he concerned himself with issues such as racial profiling and the police complaints system.

He was appointed as acting chair of the board on December 11, 2003, after Norman Gardner stepped aside as chair in June 2003 following allegations that Gardner had accepted a gun as a gift from a firearms manufacturer and 5,700 rounds of police ammunition from Toronto police officers. Heisey was made chair in January 2004. He declined to use the city's chauffeur-driven limousine, preferring public transit and his bicycle.

A week after becoming chair, Heisey was the target of a smear campaign that began with the leak of an internal police memo. Heisey refused to resign from the board, and Justice Sydney Robins of the Ontario Court of Appeal agreed that the memo was leaked to smear his name.

Gardner's suspension reduced the board to six members, paralysing the board as votes on important issues often ended in ties. Heisey publicly suggested that the province might have to take over the board when two board members left a meeting to deprive it of quorum. Heisey had said he would resign if the "dysfunctional" board did not regain its composure. In June 2004, he announced that he would not be seeking a renewal of his board appointment and told the media "The police board job is kind of like being a general. There's a peacetime general and there's a wartime general. And I think the peacetime chair job would have been quite manageable with my other responsibilities." The board later in June voted not to renew Chief Fantino's contract, with media reporting Heisey had voted against renewal.

The board unanimously endorsed Heisey's recommendations to reform the Ontario Police Complaints system in September 2004. Heisey's proposal for a single tribunal to determine all disputes, civil actions and complaints concerning police, other than criminal charges, was not accepted in the 2005 Patrick LeSage Report on the Police Complaints System.

=== Toronto Transit Commission Board ===
In October 2012, Toronto City Council appointed Heisey to the Toronto Transit Commission Board. He served eight years on the TTC Board, with his appointment ending in November 2020.

He was elected vice-chair of the TTC Board in May 2015. He was acting chair of the TTC Board for the period October 2019 - May 2020.

== Toronto Cycle Track Network ==
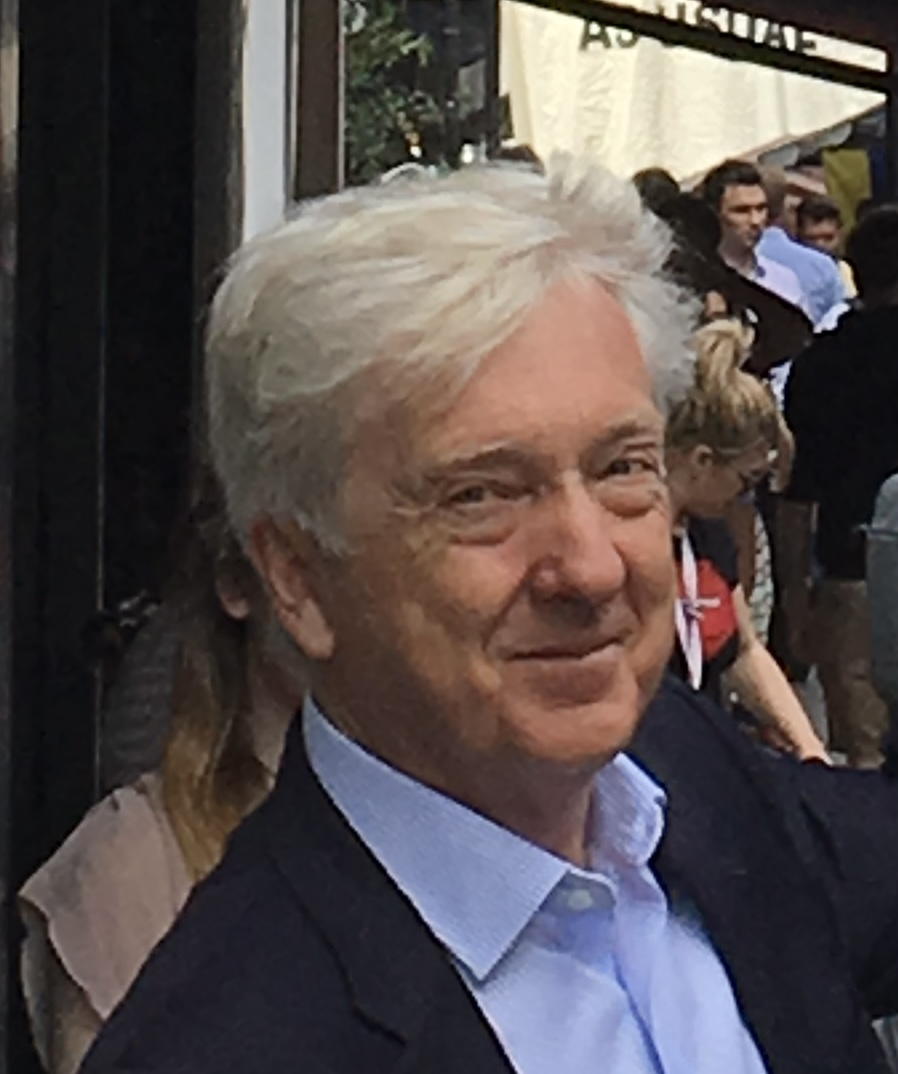
Heisey in 2017

Heisey is an avid cyclist and an advocate for safer bike lanes. He was instrumental in the creation of the first network of physically separated bicycle lanes in the Toronto between 2010 and 2015 on Sherbourne Street, Wellesley Street, Hoskin Avenue, Richmond Street and Adelaide Street.

In recognition of his contributions to the creation of the network, Toronto City Council ceremonially named the Sherbourne Street cycle track after him on February 10, 2015. On September 18, 2019, the City of Toronto officially named the cycle track in his honour.

Preceded by Norman Gardner; 1998-2004	Chair of the Toronto Police Services Board; 2004	Succeeded by Pam McConnell; 2004–2005
