= Barbara Greene =

Canadian politician

Member of Parliament for Don Valley North
- In office 1988–1993
- Preceded by: Riding established
- Succeeded by: Sarkis Assadourian

North York Controller
- In office 1972–1980 Serving with Paul Godfrey (1972-1973), John Williams (1972-1974); Alex McGivern (1972-1974); William Sutherland (1973-1976); Joseph Markin (1974-1976); Esther Shiner (1976-1980); Ron Summers (1976-1978); Robert Yuill (1976-1980)
- Succeeded by: Esther Shiner; Robert Yuill; Wililam Sutherland; Norm Gardner
- In office 1982–1985 Serving with William Sutherland; Esther Shiner; Robert Yuill
- Succeeded by: Esther Shiner; Robert Yuill; Norm Gardner; Howard Moscoe

Personal details
- Born: 1 September 1945 (age 81) Pembroke, Ontario, Canada
- Party: Progressive Conservative
- Children: 1
- Profession: Teacher

Barbara Greene (born 1 September 1945) is a former Canadian politician. She served in the House of Commons of Canada from 1988 to 1993 as a member of the Progressive Conservative Party. She was previously a municipal politician in North York, and campaigned for mayor of the city in 1985. She is a Red Tory, and holds progressive views on most social issues.

== Early life and career ==
Greene was born in Pembroke in eastern Ontario, where her father was stationed during World War II. Her parents were Alfred Greene and Mary Margaret Greene (née Hutchinson) of Toronto. Both were graduates of St. Michael's College, University of Toronto. Her parents returned to Toronto following the war, and she attended St. Monica's Separate School in North Toronto. She graduated from St Michael's College, University of Toronto in 1966 with a Bachelor of Arts in English and from the College of Education in 1967 with qualifications in English and Theatre Arts. She taught English at Victoria Park Secondary School for the North York Board of Education from September 1967 until she was elected to office in 1972.

== Municipal politician ==
=== North York City Controller, 1972-1980 ===
Greene was first elected to the North York Council in December 1972, winning a position on the city's Board of Control, the first woman elected to the body.

Her position on the Board of Control gave her an automatic seat on the Metropolitan Toronto Council. Greene's first campaign was centred primarily around a zoning issue: she opposed a municipal bylaw restricting cohabitation by people unless they were related or one person was an owner (she and her female housemates had been threatened with eviction under the terms of this bylaw). Greene also argued that she would speak for the rights of women, single persons, tenants and salaried workers. One of the first issues she was involved in was the Ambulance service. She fought a "one woman war" which resulted in the amalgamation of ambulances services in Metropolitan Toronto and the establishment of the Toronto Ambulance Service.

She was re-elected to the Board of Control in 1974, 1976 and 1978 before standing down in 1980. As a result of topping the poll for the Board of Control (on which sat the Mayor and four Controllers elected at-large), Greene became the Deputy Mayor of North York in 1974. In this capacity she sat on the Executive Committee and Budget sub committee of Metropolitan Toronto and reviewed the budgets of numerous departments at various times including those of the Community Services and Housing departments, the Police and the Ambulance Departments. She also ran for the Legislative Assembly of Ontario in the 1975 provincial election, losing to New Democrat Odoardo Di Santo in Downsview.

Greene's support for cohabitation law reform placed her in opposition to North York Mayor Mel Lastman, who initially supported her but then attempted to exclude boarding houses from the city. Following an eight-year legal battle conducted by lawyer Barry Swadron QC, on behalf of Doug Bell, a resident of North York who had been charged with living with other people to whom he was not related, the Supreme Court of Canada upheld Greene's position and struck down the municipal bylaw in April 1979.

Greene favoured market-value assessment reforms for Metro Toronto properties, and criticized provincial Treasurer Darcy McKeough for backing away from this proposal in 1978. In 1979, she spoke out against tobacco advertising on the Toronto Transit Commission. She also supported electoral reforms, including the abolition of regional Boards of Control and the direct election of the Metro Chair.

She considered running against Lastman for Mayor of North York in 1980, but declined on the grounds that she did not have the financial resources to conduct a successful campaign. She did not seek re-election to the Board of Control, and instead announced that she would enrol in a Master of Public Administration (postgraduate) program at Harvard Kennedy School. Greene sought a prominent civil service position after returning to Toronto, but was unsuccessful and returned to teaching high-school English.

=== North York City Controller, 1982-1985 ===
Greene returned to municipal politics in 1982, winning election to the second position on North York's Board of Control and receiving an automatic position on Metro's executive committee. She argued for cutbacks to the Toronto Transit Commission's budget, arguing that it had become "out of control" by 1984. Greene supported the direct election of Metro Councillors, on the grounds that indirectly elected council members were not sufficiently accountable.

She resumed her previous role as a prominent critic of Mel Lastman, arguing that his style of politics favoured backroom deals and often removed councillors from the decision-making process. Greene also called for the resignation of city planning commissioner Bruce Davidson in August 1983, arguing that his $265,000 debt to a major developer created a serious conflict-of-interest situation. She was one of only four councillors to oppose significant cutbacks to North York's public health department in June 1984, and was subsequently the only City Controller to support an affirmative action program for city.

Greene accused North York Councillor Andrew Borins of improper behaviour in 1983–84, arguing that his family's property holdings put him in an undeclared conflict of interest over the proposed North York Civic Centre. Borins sued Greene for slander and Greene responded by charging Borins with Conflict of Interest. Borins was successful in the lower courts on 20 March 1984, but this decision was overturned on appeal. A Divisional Court judge subsequently upheld Greene's accusation, and stripped Borins of his council seat on 16 April 1985.

She was offered the Progressive Conservative Party's nomination for Eglinton—Lawrence in the 1984 federal election, but declined.

Greene challenged Mel Lastman for Mayor of North York in 1985, promising a more open government and arguing that Lastman had "den[ied] North York residents the right to participate in planning their neighborhoods". She was defeated by a significant margin, in a contest marked by undisguised animosity between the candidates. Greene returned to teaching after the election, teaching Media Studies, English and Dramatic Arts with the North York Board of Education.

== Member of Parliament ==
Greene returned to political life again in 1988, narrowly winning the federal Progressive Conservative nomination for Don Valley North over Peter Ayre Phillips. She subsequently won the riding in the 1988 federal election, defeating Liberal Sarkis Assadourian by a close margin. (Concert pianist Anton Kuerti finished third for the New Democratic Party.) There was some media speculation that Greene would be appointed to cabinet, but she instead served in parliament as a backbench supporter of Brian Mulroney's government.

Greene encouraged the Progressive Conservative government to change a section of the Immigration Act in 1989, saying that it discriminated against disabled people. She also argued that Canadian copyright laws should be adjusted to permit teachers to copy and reproduce material for classroom analysis. In late November 1989, she was appointed to a parliamentary task force examining Canada's abortion laws.

Greene protested against her own government's cutbacks to multicultural organizations in 1990. She chaired the parliamentary standing committee on Health, Welfare, Social Affairs, Seniors and Status of Women and two subcommittees on Child Poverty and the Status of women. Her committee's report on violence, entitled "The War Against Women", was supported by the prime minister and opposition parties, but opposed by some Progressive Conservative backbenchers on the grounds that its title was "confrontational and inflammatory". This subsequently resulted in a significant program to combat violence against women which included funds for women's shelters and education programs for police.

Greene supported stricter firearms controls, and announced plans to introduce a bill creating a national firearms registry in late 1991. The initiative was opposed by many in her party. She also supported changing Canadian laws to outlaw discrimination based on sexual orientation

In April 1991, Greene called for existing tax and social benefits to be rolled into a single national child support program targeted to benefit low-income Canadians. Greene argued that existing benefits favoured wealthier families over the poor, and that the balance needed to be changed. Critics expressed concern that the proposed changes would threaten the universality of these programs, and reduce benefits for vulnerable middle-income families. The Mulroney government implemented the child tax credit program but did not implement the recommendations in the report for a national day care program which it had initially supported. Greene tried to convince her government to re-establish the program later in the year, without success. Greene also sought to create a national standard for social assistance to eliminate the wide disparities between the provinces.

Greene called for an adequate income and programs to assist social assistance recipients to become independent as an alternative to food banks, which she argued were creating an unwanted culture of dependence. Gerard Kennedy, the director of Toronto's Daily Bread Food Bank, said that her comments reflected a "superficial analysis" of hunger issues in Canada. Greene did not call for food banks to be shut down, despite some reports to the contrary.

Greene also argued that poverty had become a poorly defined concept in Canada, as the Low Income Cut Offs used to determine poverty levels in Canada did not include other subsidies. She argued that many people listed as being below the poverty line in Canada were not actually poor, while some of the real poor were not being assisted. She was quoted as saying, "Some of our poor may be the most well-off poor in the world. Our poor have their own apartments and televisions." Several opposition MPs and social agencies criticized Greene's comments, arguing that she was misrepresenting the issue.

Greene argued that breast cancer was becoming a problem of epidemic proportions in 1992, and argued that the federal Department of Health had become too dependent on information from drug manufacturers in regulating its treatment. She supported the creation of a new arms-length agency to approve drugs and other biomedical products. Her committee report on breast cancer resulted in a $50 million research funding program for which she received a national award from the Canadian Breast Cancer Foundation in 1992.

Greene supported Kim Campbell's 1993 bid to succeed Mulroney as Progressive Conservative leader and prime minister, arguing that Campbell's ideology was fiscally conservative and socially liberal. After Campbell's victory at the 1993 Progressive Conservative leadership convention, there was renewed speculation that Greene would be appointed to cabinet. She was not, although she was appointed as parliamentary secretary to the President of the Treasury Board on 1 September 1993.

The Progressive Conservatives were resoundingly defeated in the 1993 federal election, and Greene lost to Liberal candidate Sarkis Assadourian by a significant margin in a rematch from 1988.

== After 1993 ==
Greene returned to her teaching career after leaving federal politics. She attempted a political comeback as a provincial Progressive Conservative candidate in a 1997 by-election, but was defeated by Liberal David Caplan in the North York riding of Oriole.

== Personal life ==
Greene has one daughter and two grandchildren. Greene's pregnancy in 1978 received significant media attention not only because of the novelty, at the time, of being a pregnant female politician but because she was unmarried and declined to name the father. She is likely the first unmarried Canadian politician to give birth while in office.

== Electoral record ==
1993 Canadian federal election: Don Valley North (federal electoral district)
| Party | Candidate | Votes | % | ±% |
|---|---|---|---|---|
| Liberal | Sarkis Assadourian | 22,504 | 59.86 | +17.93 |
| Progressive Conservative | Barbara Greene | 7,238 | 19.25 | –24.18 |
| Reform | Peter Cobbold | 6,068 | 16.14 | |
| New Democratic | David Lu | 1,395 | 3.71 | –8.11 |
| Natural Law | William J. Sparling | 319 | 0.85 | |
| Abolitionist | Lindsay George King | 69 | 0.18 | |
| Total valid votes | | 37,593 | 100.0 | |
| Liberal gain from Progressive Conservative | | Swing | | +21.06 |

1988 Canadian federal election: Don Valley North (federal electoral district)
| Party | Candidate | Votes | % |
|---|---|---|---|
| Progressive Conservative | Barbara Greene | 17,551 | 43.43 |
| Liberal | Sarkis Assadourian | 16,947 | 41.94 |
| New Democratic | Anton Kuerti | 4,777 | 11.82 |
| Independent | Bernadette Michael | 577 | 1.43 |
| Libertarian | Earl Epsteine | 560 | 1.39 |
| Total valid votes | | 40,412 | 100.0 |
