= Lakeshore Teachers' College =

Teachers' college in Toronto, Ontario

- Type: Teachers' college
- Active: 1959–1975
- Parent institution: Ontario Department of Education
- Affiliations: York University (from 1971)
- Location: Toronto, Ontario, Canada
- Campus: Urban

Lakeshore Teachers' College was a teacher training institution in Toronto, Ontario, Canada, established by the Ontario Department of Education in 1959. Located on the former grounds of the Lakeshore Psychiatric Hospital in the New Toronto area of Etobicoke, the college trained elementary school teachers. It became affiliated with York University in 1971 and closed in 1975, when its students were transferred to York University.

== History ==
Lakeshore Teachers' College opened in September 1959 in response to demand for elementary school teachers during Ontario's postwar population growth.

The college occupied a modernist building designed by the Toronto architectural firm Gordon S. Adamson & Associates. Completed in 1957, the building was constructed using steel and glass.

Students could enroll in Ontario teachers' colleges directly after secondary school matriculation. Lakeshore Teachers' College offered a one-year program combining academic coursework and teaching practice for prospective elementary school teachers.

In 1971, Ontario transferred responsibility for teacher education from standalone teachers' colleges to universities. Lakeshore Teachers' College became affiliated with York University, and many of its faculty members joined York's Faculty of Education. The college continued operating under the Lakeshore name until 1975, when it closed and its students were transferred to York University.

== Campus ==
The campus was located at the foot of Kipling Avenue near Lake Ontario in the New Toronto neighbourhood of Etobicoke, now part of Toronto. The site formed part of the former Lakeshore Psychiatric Hospital grounds.

After the college closed, the building became part of Humber College's Lakeshore Campus, where it was known as "A Building".

The building was partially demolished in 2025 as part of campus redevelopment plans.

== Notable alumni ==
- Howard Moscoe – former Toronto city councillor and school trustee.
- Bev Oda – former federal cabinet minister and Member of Parliament.
- Tony Grande – former MPP for Oakwood (1975–1987) with the Ontario New Democratic Party.

== See also ==
- Toronto Normal School
- Ontario Institute for Studies in Education
- Humber Polytechnic
- Education in Ontario
