= Mackenzie Institute =

Canadian think tank

The Mackenzie Institute
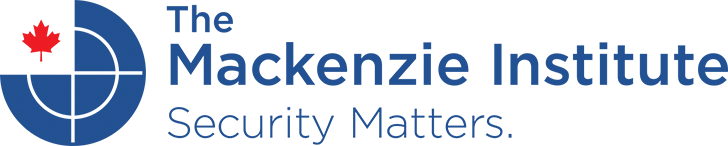
- Motto: Security Matters
- Founder: Maurice Arthur John Tugwell
- Established: 1984
- Focus: Terrorism, political research, military affairs, security issues, organized crime
- President: D. Brian Hay
- Chair: Lou Milrad
- Key people: Maurice Tugwell (founder), John C. Thompson (former president), Norm Gardner (former chair), David McFadden (former chair)
- Budget: $93,303 (2018)
- Location: Toronto, Canada
- Website: http://mackenzieinstitute.com

The Mackenzie Institute for the Study of Terrorism, Revolution and Propaganda is an independent and non-partisan think tank in Toronto, Ontario, Canada.

The institute was founded in 1984 and focuses on geopolitical security matters. It has been a registered charity with the Canada Revenue Agency since 1992.

In 2019, it was ranked as the 36th-best think tank in Canada and Mexico by the Think Tanks and Civil Societies Program at the University of Pennsylvania.

== Founding ==
It was founded in 1984 by Brigadier Dr. Maurice Tugwell, an academic and former career British Army officer. Tugwell served in the army from 1943 to 1978 and was awarded the rank of Commander of the Order of the British Empire in 1973. After retiring from the Army, he earned a doctorate in war studies from the University of London and emigrated to Canada, where he became a professor at the University of New Brunswick (UNB). Before founding the Mackenzie Institute in 1984, he founded the Centre for Conflict Studies at UNB in 1978. The Institute is named after the explorer Sir Alexander Mackenzie.

== Current activities ==
The Mackenzie Institute conducts conferences and publishes online research papers on a wide variety of geopolitical security matters, with a focus on terrorism, political extremism, warfare, and organized crime.

The institute has been called upon by committees of the Parliament of Canada to provide expert testimony on security issues, which has included appearances before the Special Senate Committee on the Anti-terrorism Act and the House of Commons Standing Committee on Justice, Human Rights, Public Safety and Emergency Preparedness in 2005, the Special Senate Committee on Anti-terrorism in 2010, the House of Commons Standing Committee on Public Safety and National Security in 2015, and the Standing Senate Committee on National Security and Defence in 2016.

During the COVID-19 pandemic, the institute partnered with the CEO Global Network to put on a series of webinars on security issues.

According to the 2019 Global Go To Think Tank Index Report (Think Tanks and Civil Societies Program, University of Pennsylvania), the institute ranks as the 36th-best think tank in Canada and Mexico.

== Funding ==
The Mackenzie Institute is a non-profit organization that depends upon individual donors and charitable foundations and does not accept government funding. It has been a registered charity with the Canada Revenue Agency since 1992, and it had revenues of $87,926.00 against expenses of $93,303.00 in 2018.

== Governance ==
The Mackenzie Institute has an advisory board and a board of governors. As of July 2020, the advisory board was chaired by Lewis W. MacKenzie, a retired Canadian general, and the board of governors was chaired by Lou Milrad, a retired business and technology lawyer. Its past chair was David McFadden.

== Controversy ==
Several newspaper reports have described the Mackenzie Institute as a conservative or right-wing organization. In 1994, the journalist Michael Valpy criticized the institute for producing what he described as an ideologically-driven report of supposed "leftist conspiracies." John C. Thompson, the institute's president, repeatedly rejected such descriptions and described himself as a "classical liberal," Thompson wrote, "If being a traditional liberal these days means being condemned as a right-wing nut, I plead guilty."

In July 1995, members of the Animal Liberation Front allegedly sent a pipe bomb to Thompson's office in Toronto. His assistant could have been killed except that the device's battery had become disconnected through mishandling by Canada Post.

In 2005, the Mackenzie Institute released a report entitled "Waiting for the Kaboom: Indicators to Watch for," which was described as a citizen's guide to finding terrorists. In the report, Thompson encouraged Canadians to watch for thefts of credentials and credit cards, attempts to buy weapons in bulk, increased visits to access tunnels under office towers, and large groups of men living together "for no apparent purpose." He also warned Canadians about people wearing bulky clothing in hot weather and argued that suicide bombers sometimes wear several sets of underwear to protect their groins for the virgins, believed by them to be received by martyrs in the afterlife. Those guidelines were welcomed by some law enforcement groups but also were met with some criticism. The Canadian Public Safety Ministry declined to comment on the release.

The institute later issued a revised version of the report, under the new title "Precursors of Hostile Intent: Signs of a Potential Terrorist Attack."
