= Monte Kwinter =

Canadian politician (1931–2023)

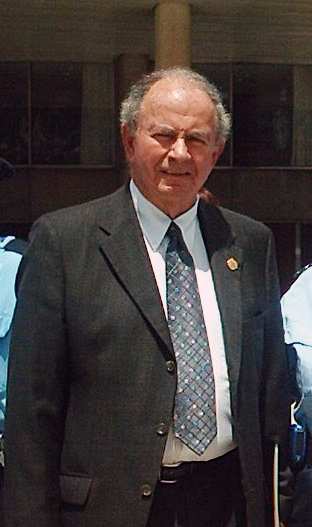
- MPP Kwinter in 2006

Member of the Ontario Provincial Parliament for York Centre Wilson Heights (1985–1999)
- In office May 2, 1985 – June 7, 2018
- Preceded by: David Rotenberg
- Succeeded by: Roman Baber

Personal details
- Born: March 22, 1931 Toronto, Ontario, Canada
- Died: July 21, 2023 (aged 92)
- Party: Ontario Liberal
- Occupation: Real estate agent
- Website: Official website

Monte Kwinter (March 22, 1931 – July 21, 2023) was a Canadian politician in Ontario. He was a Liberal member of the Legislative Assembly of Ontario from 1985 until 2018. He represented the ridings of Wilson Heights from 1985 to 1999, and York Centre from 1999 to 2018. Kwinter was a cabinet minister in the government of David Peterson from 1985 to 1990 and also in Dalton McGuinty's government from 2003 to 2007. Kwinter was the oldest person ever to be an MPP in Ontario, although at his death, Raymond Cho, was seven months shy of surpassing him.

On January 26, 2013, Kwinter became the oldest person to ever serve in the Ontario legislature at the age of 81 years 310 days, surpassing previous record holder Lex MacKenzie, who was 81 years and 309 days old when he left provincial politics in 1967.

On July 20, 2017, Kwinter announced that he would not be seeking re-election in the upcoming 2018 election and that "the time has come to let the next generation serve, and I look forward to offering my support to our future York Centre Liberal MPP."

== Background ==
Monte Kwinter was born in Toronto on March 22, 1931. He was educated at the Ontario College of Art, Syracuse University, the Massachusetts Institute of Technology, the Institute of Contemporary Art, Boston, and the Université de Montréal. He has a degree in fine arts, specializing in industrial design.

Kwinter worked in real estate before entering political life, eventually owning his own firm within the field. He was also a founding member of the Toronto Regional Council of B'nai Brith Canada, served on the board of directors of the Upper Canadian Zoological Society, and the Canadian National Exhibition, was chair of the Toronto Harbour Commission, chair of the Toronto Humane Society, vice-president of the Ontario College of Art, and served as an executive member on the League for Human Rights of B'nai B'rith Canada.

Kwinter was also involved in the Liberal Party of Canada as a fundraiser and organizer and worked on John Turner's 1984 leadership campaign.

== Politics ==
=== Peterson government ===
Kwinter was elected to the Ontario legislature in the provincial election of 1985 as a Liberal, defeating incumbent Progressive Conservative David Rotenberg and New Democrat city councillor Howard Moscoe in the North York riding of Wilson Heights (which has a large immigrant population and a prominent Orthodox Jewish community; Kwinter was himself Jewish).

Kwinter had been a strong advocate for the completion of the controversial Spadina Expressway in Toronto but abandoned this position soon after winning election.

On June 26, 1985, he was appointed Minister of Consumer and Commercial Relations and Minister of Financial Institutions.

Kwinter was easily re-elected in the provincial election of 1987, and was named Minister of Industry, Trade and Technology in September of that year. In June 1989, Kwinter was implicated in the Patti Starr corruption scandal. Starr, who was head of the National Council of Jewish Women, misused her position by having the organization make political contributions to the riding associations of prominent Liberal MPPs. Kwinter's riding of Wilson Heights was among those who received these illegal contributions. On August 2, when Peterson shuffled his cabinet in the wake of the scandal, Kwinter was one of only two ministers who retained their positions despite the scandal. Eight other ministers lost their positions.

==== Cabinet ====
Peterson ministry, Province of Ontario (1985–1990)
Cabinet posts (3)
Predecessor	Office	Successor
Hugh O'Neil	Minister of Industry, Trade and Technology; 1987–1990	Allan Pilkey
New position	Minister of Financial Institutions; 1986–1987	Robert Nixon
Bob Runciman	Minister of Consumer and Commercial Relations; 1985–1987	Bill Wrye

=== Opposition ===
The Liberals were upset by the New Democratic Party in the 1990 provincial election, although Kwinter himself was again re-elected without difficulty, although one contender was better known as the alter-ego of Ed the Sock.

Kwinter faced a more serious challenge in the 1995 election, which was won by the Progressive Conservatives; Tory candidate Sam Pasternak came within 3,000 votes of upsetting him. Kwinter was not a prominent figure in the Legislative Assembly during his time in the opposition, though he was nevertheless regarded as a strong community representative.

Despite having a reputation for being on the right wing of the Ontario Liberal Party, Kwinter supported left wing candidate Gerard Kennedy in the party's 1996 leadership convention.

The Progressive Conservative government of Mike Harris reduced the number of provincial ridings from 130 to 103 in 1996, forcing several incumbent Members of Provincial Parliament (MPPs) to compete against one another for re-election. In some cases, MPPs from the same party were forced to compete against one another for their riding nominations. Kwinter was challenged for the Liberal nomination in the new riding of York Centre by fellow MPP Anna-Marie Castrilli, who had unsuccessfully competed for the party's leadership in 1996.

Castrilli's challenge to Kwinter was extremely controversial, and was marked by serious divisions in the local riding association. Kwinter was subjected to a number of incidents of anti-Semitic abuse during this period, and on one occasion received hate mail at his legislative office. Castrilli was not involved in these incidents, but they were regarded by many as reinforcing the unpleasant character of the nomination battle.

Liberal leader Dalton McGuinty tried to convince Castrilli to run in a different riding, but was unsuccessful. Rumours began to circulate that Kwinter was planning to defect to the Progressive Conservatives in the event that he was defeated. As it happened, there was never an opportunity to test this speculation—Kwinter was able to defeat Castrilli, who defected to the Tories herself shortly thereafter.

Kwinter's nomination difficulties proved to be his only real challenge of the 1999 campaign, and he was again returned by a significant margin in the general election. The Progressive Conservatives were again victorious across the province, and Kwinter remained on the opposition benches.

In 2002, Kwinter publicly opposed the Liberal Party's position on tax credits for parents who send their children to private and non-Catholic denominational schools. The party opposes such credits as a detrimental to the public system. Kwinter referred to the distinction between publicly funded Catholic Separate Schools and non-Catholic denominational schools as one of discrimination, though he also opposed funding for non-denominational private schools.

=== McGuinty government ===
Kwinter was again re-elected in the 2003 election without difficulty. The election was won by the Liberals, and there was considerable media speculation as to whether or not Dalton McGuinty would appoint the septuagenarian Kwinter to cabinet again. Ultimately, Kwinter's public disagreements with party policy were not enough to sideline his career: he was appointed Ontario Minister of Public Safety and Security (essentially a retitled Solicitor-General's position) on October 23, 2003.

Kwinter put forward a plan to combat marijuana grow-ops in Ontario that would permit local utilities to cut off electrical power to those in the illegal industry. There were many who opposed this plan on the grounds that innocent citizens could see their power cut off without warning in the event of an administrative or legal error.

Kwinter was re-elected in the 2007 provincial election despite a stronger challenge from the Progressive Conservative Party due to its support for extending funding to Jewish and other religious day schools. Kwinter broke with the Liberal platform and cabinet solidarity by supporting the Progressive Conservative's proposal. The Liberal government was re-elected however Kwinter was dropped from Cabinet in the post-election cabinet shuffle. While no official reason was given for the demotion the Jewish Tribune claimed that it was a result of the position he took on school funding during the election campaign though it did not name its source for this claim.

Following the cabinet shuffle Premier McGuinty appointed Kwinter to the position of chair Ontario investment and trade advisory council and the Parliamentary Assistant to the Minister of Economic Development and Trade (Investment Attraction and Trade).

Kwinter retained his seat in the 2011 provincial election against Progressive Conservative candidate Michael Mostyn by 3,188 votes.

==== Cabinet ====
McGuinty ministry, Province of Ontario (2003–2013)
Cabinet post (1)
Predecessor	Office	Successor
Rob Sampson	Minister of Community Safety and Correctional Services; 2003–2007	Rick Bartolucci

=== Wynne government ===
Kwinter's riding association nominated him to run as the Liberal candidate in the next provincial election which occurred on June 12, 2014. He defeated PC candidate Avi Yufest by 6,066 votes.

From June 2014 to June 2016, he served as Parliamentary Assistant to the Minister of Citizenship, Immigration and International Trade. As of June 2016, he served as Parliamentary Assistant to the Minister of International Trade.

In October 2016, it was reported that Kwinter was living in a nursing home, Kensington Place, while recovering from an illness. In March 2017, Kwinter reappeared in public after his months long recovery from shingles. Requiring the use of a wheelchair and aid from a caregiver, Kwinter intended to return to his role and run in the 2018 election, but later chose to retire from politics at the 2018 election, when the Wynne government was soundly defeated. Ramon Estaris lost that election, placing third to one-term MPP, Roman Baber.

== Death ==
Monte Kwinter died on July 21, 2023, at the age of 92.
