= Wilson Heights (electoral district) =

Former provincial electoral district in Ontario, Canada

Ontario electoral district

Defunct provincial electoral district
- Legislature: Legislative Assembly of Ontario
- District created: 1975
- District abolished: 2001
- First contested: 1975
- Last contested: 1999

Demographics
- Census division: Toronto
- Census subdivision: Toronto

Wilson Heights was a provincial electoral district in Ontario, Canada. It was created prior to the 1975 provincial election and eliminated in 1999, when most of its territory was incorporated into the ridings of York Centre, Willowdale, and Eglinton—Lawrence. Wilson Heights was located in the neighbourhood of Wilson Heights in the former municipality of North York, which is now part of Toronto.

Three Members of Provincial Parliament represented the riding during its history. The first, Liberal Vern Singer, was a veteran provincial politician who had previously represented the York Centre and Downsview ridings. He retired in 1977 and was replaced by Progressive Conservative David Rotenberg, who briefly served as a minister without portfolio in Frank Miller's government. Its longest-serving representative was Monte Kwinter, who defeated Rotenberg in the 1985 provincial election and held the riding for fourteen years until its dissolution. Kwinter was a cabinet minister in the government of David Peterson, and now represents York Centre.

The Wilson Heights division had a significant Jewish population, at almost 40% of the total population.

== Members of Provincial Parliament ==
Parliament	Years	Member	Party
See Downsview riding prior to 1975
30th	1975–1977	Vern Singer	Liberal
31st	1977–1981	David Rotenberg	Progressive Conservative
32nd	1981–1985	David Rotenberg	Progressive Conservative
33rd	1985–1987	Monte Kwinter	Liberal
34th	1987–1990	Monte Kwinter	Liberal
35th	1990–1995	Monte Kwinter	Liberal
36th	1995–1999	Monte Kwinter	Liberal
		Sourced from the Ontario Legislative Assembly	
Merged into York Centre, Willowdale and Eglinton—Lawrence (1999)

== Election results ==
1975 Ontario general election
Party	Candidate	Votes	Vote %
Liberal	Vern Singer	11,480	40.2
Conservative	David Rotenberg	9,262	32.4
New Democrat	Howard Moscoe	7,476	26.1
Independent	George Dance	372	1.3
	Total	28,590	

1977 Ontario general election
Party	Candidate	Votes	Vote %
Conservative	David Rotenberg	13,792	49.1
Liberal	Murray Markin	7,057	25.1
New Democrat	Howard Moscoe	7,055	25.1
Libertarian	Webster Webb	180	0.6
	Total	28,084	

1981 Ontario general election
Party	Candidate	Votes	Vote %
Conservative	David Rotenberg	11,579	48.4
Liberal	Elinor Caplan	8,760	36.6
New Democrat	Greg Iaonnou	3,580	15.0
	Total	23,919	

1985 Ontario general election
Party	Candidate	Votes	Vote %
Liberal	Monte Kwinter	12,425	40.9
Conservative	David Rotenberg	10,068	33.2
New Democrat	Howard Moscoe	7,858	25.9
	Total	30,351	

1987 Ontario general election
Party	Candidate	Votes	Vote %
Liberal	Monte Kwinter	17,018	57.4
New Democrat	Jennifer Paton	6,752	22.8
Conservative	David Farb	5,885	19.8
	Total	29,655	

1990 Ontario general election
Party	Candidate	Votes	Vote %
Liberal	Monte Kwinter	12,204	44.8
New Democrat	John Fagan	9,540	35.0
Conservative	Steven Kerzner	4,361	16.0
Green	Vanessa van Schoor	835	3.1
Libertarian	Roman Vrba	303	1.1
	Total	27,243	

1995 Ontario general election
Party	Candidate	Votes	Vote %
Liberal	Monte Kwinter	12,468	44.6
Conservative	Sam Pasternack	9,772	35.0
New Democrat	Claudia White	4,612	16.5
Natural Law	Mike Dubinsky	438	1.6
Green	Tom Salsberg	303	1.1
Family Coalition	Dan Largy	231	0.8
Independent	David Yates	109	0.4
	Total	27,933	

== See also ==
- List of Ontario provincial electoral districts
- Canadian provincial electoral districts
