= Sonnee Cohen =

Canadian politician

Sonnee Ruben Cohen was a businessman and candidate for political candidate in Toronto, Ontario, Canada. He ran in numerous municipal elections, and was an independent candidate in the 1967 provincial campaign.

Cohen was a trustee with B'nai B'rith in the 1940s, and later served on the executive of the Toronto's Herzl Zion Club in the 1950s.

== Private career ==
Cohen was a businessman and public relations worker in private life. He worked for Toronto's Dominion Dry Ginger Ale Co. for several years. He also designed products for children. In 1955, he began selling a hockey puck with ball bearings designed for year-round use. He later designed a safety kit for schoolchildren.

Cohen was listed as chairman of the Canadian Diabetic Association in 1965, and as Vice-Chair of the North York Safety Council in 1966. He asked Canadians to support a mobile diabetes detection unit in 1970, and promoted healthy eating habits later in the decade.

Cohen founded Worldwide Diabetes Information Service in 1977, a non-profit organization specializing in diabetes information. His work was profiled in a 1985 Toronto Star feature.

Cohen was listed in Baycrest and Baycrest Foundation's "Family of Supporters" list for 2005-06.

== Perennial candidate ==
Cohen ran for North York's public school board in the 1964, 1966 and 1969 municipal elections, for North York City Council in 1972, 1974 and 1991, and for the North York Board of Control in 1982 and 1985. He lost each time.

Cohen campaigned as a reform candidate in 1969, and was endorsed by the North York Liberal Association.

During the 1985 contest, he called for better conditions in nursing homes. Seventy-seven years old in 1991, he centred his campaign on improved health care and the prevention of child and senior abuse.
