= David Rotenberg =

Canadian politician (1930–2022)

Ontario MPP
- In office 1977–1985
- Preceded by: Vernon Singer
- Succeeded by: Monte Kwinter
- Constituency: Wilson Heights

Personal details
- Born: July 24, 1930 Toronto, Ontario, Canada
- Died: January 13, 2022 (aged 91)
- Party: Progressive Conservative
- Occupation: Insurance agent
- Cabinet: Minister without portfolio (1985, February–May)

David Rotenberg (July 24, 1930 – January 13, 2022) was a Canadian politician in Ontario. He served in the Legislative Assembly of Ontario from 1977 to 1985 as a member of the Progressive Conservative Party, and was briefly a cabinet minister in the government of Frank Miller.

== Background ==
David Rotenberg was born in Toronto on July 24, 1930. He was educated at the University of Toronto. Rotenberg worked as an insurance agent, and served on Toronto City Council and Metro Toronto Council. He was first elected in the 1960 Toronto municipal election and re-elected in 1962, 1964, 1966, and 1969.

In the 1972 election, he ran for mayor, and lost to David Crombie in a close, three-way race. Rotenberg was later appointed as a commissioner on the Toronto Transit Commission, and served from 1975 to 1977.

== Politics ==
Rotenberg ran in the 1975 provincial election, and finished second against Liberal Vern Singer in Wilson Heights.

Rotenberg was elected to the Ontario legislature in the 1977 provincial election, defeating New Democratic Party candidate Howard Moscoe by 2,993 votes (Singer had previously announced his retirement). He served as a backbench supporter of William Davis's government, and defeated Liberal Elinor Caplan to be re-elected in 1981.

Rotenberg supported Dennis Timbrell to succeed Davis as party leader and premier in 1985, and endorsed Larry Grossman after Timbrell's elimination on the second ballot. Rotenberg appears in a pictorial section between pages 106 and 107, standing between Grossman and Timbrell as the latter accepts a Grossman button. The caption beneath the picture identifies Rotenberg as a Timbrell supporter. Grossman lost to Frank Miller on the final count. After the leadership convention, Miller appointed Rotenberg to cabinet as a minister without portfolio responsible for Urban Affairs.

Near the end of his tenure as premier, Bill Davis announced that he would extend full funding to the province's Catholic school system. Anglican Archbishop Lewis Garnsworthy, a vocal opponent of the plan, responded by charging that Davis had changed Ontario's education system "by decree", in the same way that Adolf Hitler had changed the education system in Nazi Germany. Rotenberg later said that Garnsworthy's comments created a climate of religious intolerance in the province, and took support away from the Progressive Conservative Party. "I think he would probably get the Ian Paisley award of the year, because his speech made it respectable to be anti-Catholic," Rotenberg was quoted as saying. Although the opposition Liberals and New Democratic Party also supported full funding for Catholic schools, the governing Conservatives were more seriously affected because some of their religious supporters abstained from voting, depriving them of significant support. Garnsworthy's speech was credited with prolonging the controversy during the 1985 campaign.

Rotenberg was unseated in 1985 campaign, losing to Liberal candidate Monte Kwinter by 2,188 votes. The Progressive Conservatives were reduced to a minority government and it was brought down by a Liberal-NDP accord shortly after the election.

A decade later, Rotenberg attempted a return to politics and campaigned for the House of Commons of Canada in the 1997 federal election as a candidate of the Progressive Conservatives in the riding of Eglinton—Lawrence. He lost to incumbent Liberal Joe Volpe. The Canadian Alliance tried to recruit Rotenberg as a candidate in Willowdale for the 2000 federal election, but he was disqualified because he had not been a party member for long enough.

== Later life and death ==
Rotenberg was named as an honorary officer in the Canadian Jewish Congress. He died on January 13, 2022, at the age of 91.

== Electoral record ==
=== Provincial ===
1975 Ontario general election: Wilson Heights
Party	Candidate	Votes	Vote %
Liberal	Vern Singer	11,480	40.2
Progressive Conservative	David Rotenberg	9,262	32.4
New Democratic	Howard Moscoe	7,476	26.1
Independent	George Dance	372	1.3
	Total	28,590	

1977 Ontario general election: Wilson Heights
Party	Candidate	Votes	Vote %
Progressive Conservative	David Rotenberg	13,792	49.1
Liberal	Murray Markin	7,057	25.1
New Democratic	Howard Moscoe	7,055	25.1
Libertarian	Webster Webb	180	0.6
	Total	28,084	

1981 Ontario general election: Wilson Heights
Party	Candidate	Votes	Vote %
Progressive Conservative	David Rotenberg	11,579	48.4
Liberal	Elinor Caplan	8,760	36.6
New Democratic	Greg Iaonnou	3,580	15.0
	Total	23,919	

1985 Ontario general election: Wilson Heights
Party	Candidate	Votes	Vote %
Liberal	Monte Kwinter	12,425	40.9
Progressive Conservative	David Rotenberg	10,068	33.2
New Democratic	Howard Moscoe	7,858	25.9
	Total	30,351	

=== Federal ===
1997 Canadian federal election: Eglinton—Lawrence
Party	Candidate	Votes	%	±%	Expenditures
Liberal	Joe Volpe	25,985	59.24	−4.07	$49,531
Progressive Conservative	David Rotenberg	9,977	22.75	+5.11	$34,874
New Democratic	Sam Savona	3,955	9.02	+4.36	$14,088
Reform	Charles Van Tuinen	3,547	8.09	−3.65	$10,529
Natural Law	Robyn Brandon	397	0.91		$0
Total valid votes		43,861	100.00		
Total rejected ballots		320			
Turnout		44,181	67.00		
Electors on the lists		65,945			
Percentage change figures are factored for redistribution.
Sources: Official Results, Elections Canada and Financial Returns, Elections Canada.
