= Robert Yuill =

Canadian politician (1924–2006)

Robert Frederick Murray Yuill (1924 — May 17, 2006), known as Bob Yuill, was a municipal politician in Toronto, Ontario, Canada.

He served on the North York council for twenty-four years, at first as a ward councillor and later as a member of the North York Board of Control. He was also a member of the Metro Toronto council.

== Background ==
Yuill was born in Toronto, and served in the Canadian reserve forces during World War II. He received a Commerce degree from the University of Toronto in 1948, and later operated a business forms company for twenty-five years. His son Donald Yuill was a North York City councillor for Ward 10 for the years 1988-1996.

== Political career ==
Yuill was first elected to the North York Council in the 1964 Toronto election, following a failed bid in the 1962 Toronto election. He remained a ward councillor until 1976, when he was elected as a controller on the North York Board of Control in the 1976 Toronto election. He served as a controller until 1988, when the position was eliminated. Yuill's controller position also gave him a seat on the Metro council, where he was a close ally of Paul Godfrey. He served on the powerful Metro budget committee in the late 1970s, and was also parks committee chair a member of the Canadian National Exhibition Association Board. Yuill was also chair of the North York Papal Visit Committee in 1984, during John Paul II's visit to the city.

Yuill was a fiscal conservative. He opposed plans for Metro Toronto to provide financial aid to university students, and once described a proposed 34% raise for Metro managers as "baloney". He also supported an extension of the Spadina Expressway to downtown Toronto, arguing "Suburbs were designed for cars".

He also held socially conservative views on some issues. During the 1970s, he recommended that North York Mayor Mel Lastman give a Mayor's Medallion to anti-gay rights advocate Anita Bryant during her visit to the city. Lastman declined. In 1985, he tried to convince Metro Council to cancel its grant to the Toronto Counselling Centre for Lesbians and Gays. Yuill also supported an early workfare scheme in 1979, which was rejected by the Metro Council. In 1988, he supported a ban on Now Magazine from parts of city hall as a response to the journal's adult-themed personal ads. He also argued that Toronto's police should be allowed to use "strong-arm tactics" to combat the city's drug problem. He opposed the extension of Sunday shopping, and was skeptical of affirmative action. In 1986, he was one of seven Metro Councillors to oppose a boycott of goods from South Africa.

Yuill opposed the construction of the Skydome in downtown Toronto, arguing that its location would lead to increased traffic jams.

Toronto's municipal government system was significantly changed in 1988, with the introduction of direct elections to the Metro Council and the elimination of control boards. Yuill ran for North York Ward 8 councillor in the 1988 Toronto election, saying "I don't want to go down to Metro. I don't like it anymore. They're reckless spenders." He was defeated by Joanne Flint, a political newcomer, and was subsequently appointed as chair of the newly created North York Parking Authority.

== Death ==
Yuill died of heart failure in May 2006, at the age of 82. He was buried in Elmvale, in south Georgian Bay.
