= Board of Control (municipal government) =

In municipal government, a Board of Control, or Board of Estimate, is an executive body that usually deals with financial and administrative matters. The idea is that a small body of four or five people is better able to make certain decisions than a large, unwieldy city council. Boards of Control were introduced in many North American municipalities in the early 20th century as a product of the municipal reform movement. They proved unpopular with many as they tended to centralize power in a small body while disempowering city councils.

== Membership ==
Boards of Control typically consist of the mayor and several Controllers who are elected on a citywide basis as opposed to aldermen who were elected on a ward basis.

From the 1897 Charter, New York City had the New York City Board of Estimate, which had similar functions starting with the amalgamation of Metropolitan New York in 1898. The members included the Mayor, Borough Presidents, and other city-wide officials. It was given additional powers in 1937.

The Boards were criticized as undemocratic. Boards of Control tended to be less representative of the diverse opinions and communities, with majority views among the population being overrepresented. As well, since they were elected by a larger electorate running for a seat on the Board of Control would be prohibitively expensive for many municipal politicians, resulting in wealthier politicians being more likely to run for the body. Lastly, Boards of Control tended to meet in closed sessions (in camera) as opposed to open sessions in the manner of city councils, making them less accountable to the public.

== Criticism and Abolition ==
Because of these problems, many municipalities abolished Boards of Control in the years following World War II. The Ottawa Board of Control operated from 1908 until 1980 and the Toronto Board of Control operated from 1896 to 1969, and was directly elected beginning in 1904. Several suburban municipalities in Metropolitan Toronto, Canada, had boards of control from the 1960s until the late 1980s, including North York, Scarborough, York, and Etobicoke.

In 1989, the Supreme Court of the United States ruled in Board of Estimate of City of New York v. Morris that the one person, one vote rule applied to the boards.

The London City Council in London, Ontario was one of the last remaining municipalities in North America to retain a Board of Control. It was abolished with the 2010 municipal elections.

== See also ==
- Toronto Board of Control
- Ottawa Board of Control
