= Mel Lastman =

Canadian politician (1933–2021)

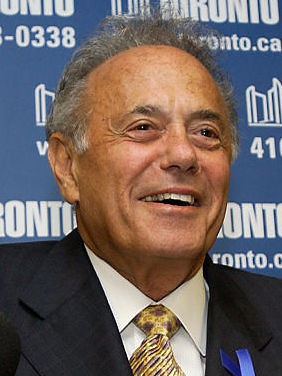
- Lastman in 2003

62nd Mayor of Toronto
- In office January 1, 1998 – November 30, 2003
- Preceded by: Barbara Hall (Mayor of Old Toronto); Alan Tonks (Chairman of Metropolitan Toronto)
- Succeeded by: David Miller

3rd Mayor of North York
- In office January 1, 1973 – December 31, 1997
- Preceded by: Basil H. Hall
- Succeeded by: Position abolished (Note: The City of North York was amalgamated with the 5 other municipalities of Metro Toronto to form the city of Toronto on January 1, 1998.)

Personal details
- Born: Melvin Douglas Lastman; March 9, 1933 Toronto, Ontario, Canada
- Died: December 11, 2021 (aged 88)
- Resting place: Mount Sinai Memorial Park
- Party: Independent (municipal); Progressive Conservative (provincial)
- Spouse: Marilyn Bornstein (m. 1952; died 2020)
- Domestic partner: Grace Louie (1957–1971)
- Children: 4, including Dale
- Occupation: Salesman; businessman; politician

Melvin Douglas Lastman (March 9, 1933 – December 11, 2021) was a Canadian businessman and politician who served as the third mayor of North York from 1973 to 1997 and the 62nd mayor of Toronto from 1998 to 2003. He was the first person to serve as the mayor of Toronto following the amalgamation of Metropolitan Toronto and its six constituent municipalities in 1998. Lastman is also known for having founded the Bad Boy Furniture chain.

== Early life ==
Lastman was born on March 9, 1933, in Toronto to Jewish immigrants from Poland, Rose and Louis Lastman. He began his sales career as a child, hawking fruit and vegetables at his family's Kensington Market grocery store.

He met Marilyn Bornstein when he was 16 and she was 13, and they were married three years later. He left school after Grade 12 and, with Marilyn's help, got a job at a College Street furniture store. He quickly established himself as a successful salesman. He switched to selling appliances and promoted himself as "Mr. Laundry" (alias the "Bad Boy").

== Business career ==
Lastman opened a small frame building at Kennedy Road and Eglinton Avenue in Scarborough, Ontario, selling used appliances.

=== Bad Boy Furniture ===
At age 22, in 1955, Lastman bought out Heather Hill Appliances and established Bad Boy Furniture.

Having adopted the nickname "the Bad Boy" for himself, he developed Bad Boy Furniture into a chain of stores around the Toronto area. "Bad Boy" Lastman was associated with many publicity stunts, including travelling to the Arctic in the 1960s to "sell a refrigerator to an Eskimo." Lastman sold the chain in 1975 to run in the Ontario general election. The Bad Boy trademark was ultimately acquired by the large furniture chain The Brick but the new owners allowed it to lapse through lack of use until it expired.

In 1991, Lastman's son Blayne and business partner Marvin Kirsh re-launched the chain under the name Bad Boy Furniture Warehouse Ltd, over the objections of the senior Lastman, who felt the economic climate was unsatisfactory. The store was soon memorable to most Ontario television viewers who saw its commercials. The advertisements featured Lastman in a cameo appearance, Blayne in a striped prison uniform, and always ended with the line: "Who's better than Bad Boy? Nooobody!" In 2006 it was formally renamed as Lastman's Bad Boy and since as Lastman Bad Boy Superstore.

Bad Boy Furniture Warehouse Ltd. filed for bankruptcy protection in November 2023 to deal with $13.7 million in debts. After failing to file a proposal to creditors, Bad Boy became officially bankrupt in January 2024; any remaining assets would be sold off to pay creditors.

== Political career ==
=== North York municipal politics ===
Lastman entered politics in 1969, when he ran for and was elected to the North York Board of Control. It was there he met another rising young political figure, Paul Godfrey, who would later serve as Metro Chairman.

==== Mayoralty ====
On December 4, 1972, Lastman was elected mayor of North York by defeating fellow North York controller Paul Hunt for the open mayoral seat. Lastman took office on January 1, 1973, and was also automatically a member of Metro Council. Lastman was supported by many in North York for operating that city efficiently and effectively, and for keeping property taxes low. He successfully promoted the creation of North York City Centre, which became unofficially known as the "new downtown" of "Toronto" (or Metropolitan Toronto). At the North York Civic Centre, Mel Lastman Square is named after him.

While supporting development, he also supported the introduction of residential rent controls in the mid-1970s.

In 1975, Lastman ran for the Legislative Assembly of Ontario as a Progressive Conservative candidate in the Armourdale electoral district. He lost to former Toronto Mayor Phil Givens who was running for the Ontario Liberal Party. That provincial election was his only election loss throughout his career.

Lastman joined the Ontario Liberal Party in 1987, although he subsequently claimed that it was the result of a misunderstanding. He agreed to support Norman Gardner's bid for the Liberal nomination in Willowdale, and did not realize that he was also purchasing a party membership card in the process. He did not regret his accidental membership, but said he had no long-term loyalty to the party (Globe and Mail, April 28, 1987).

Lastman was a vociferous critic of specific details of Metropolitan Toronto's Metro Hall project, attacking Metro Council's decision to locate the Can$220 million building downtown. He argued that it would be more equitable and much cheaper to build the headquarters in the suburbs. Metro Hall was later passed over in favour of City Hall for the future amalgamated city of Toronto. An attempt to put it up for sale only received a maximum bid of $125 million which was far below the construction cost.

Throughout Lastman's political career, he was generally supported by the Progressive Conservatives and Liberals, such as Norman Gardner, Mike Colle, Mike Feldman, Joe Volpe, and David Shiner. Though usually opposed by the New Democratic Party, he did cross party lines to work with left-leaning councillors Jack Layton and Olivia Chow.

=== Post-amalgamation Toronto mayor ===
In 1997, Lastman's position was abolished when the provincial government under Mike Harris amalgamated North York with Scarborough, York, East York, Etobicoke, and Old Toronto, creating a single-tier "megacity" forming the new City of Toronto. Lastman ran for the mayoralty of the "megacity" defeating incumbent Toronto Mayor Barbara Hall. Lastman's electoral victory was credited to his very strong base of support in the suburban cities, namely North York as well as in Etobicoke and Scarborough. Hall had won the majority of the vote in old Toronto, York and East York.

In 1998, Lastman attended a cities conference in Birmingham, UK, held in conjunction with the 24th G8 Summit where he used the phrase "Diversity is our strength", by explaining to the other mayors that Toronto worked because diverse cultural communities learned from and benefited from each other. This led to the city motto, "Diversity Our Strength".

Lastman gained national attention after multiple snowstorms, including the January Blizzard of 1999, dumped 118 cm (46.5 in) of snow and effectively immobilized the city. He called in the Canadian Army to aid snow removal by use of their equipment to augment police and emergency services. The move was ridiculed by some in other parts of the country, fuelled in part by what was perceived as a frivolous use of resources, although Lastman's defenders noted that at the time the army was called in, Toronto was already at a standstill, and that the Environment Canada weather forecast called for another severe storm to hit the city later that week.

Lastman paid back the soldiers by giving them each a free pass to a Toronto Maple Leafs hockey game in honour of their hard work. These tickets were obtained free of charge due to an agreement with the Toronto Maple Leafs' management claiming that if these soldiers had not come out to shovel the snow, then the Leafs game that day wouldn't have had as many people attending. Ten years later, in 2009, Lastman gave an interview to the Toronto Star newspaper, stating he was proud of his decision to bring in the army during the Blizzard of 1999.

Some expected that Lastman would face Independent federal MP John Nunziata in the 2000 municipal election, but Nunziata dispelled the rumours when he found that he could not hold onto his seat in Parliament while campaigning for Mayor. Re-elected in November 2000, with an 80% majority, his closest opponent, civic activist Tooker Gomberg, drew just a little more than 8% of the vote.

Lastman shared Gomberg's three main campaign planks; namely, committing Toronto to 100% recycling diversion by 2010 to replace the controversial Adams Mine plan, agreeing with Prime Minister Jean Chrétien to end homelessness in Toronto, and appointing Jane Jacobs, the ethicist and urbanist, to head the Toronto Charter Committee to explore the potential for more autonomy for Toronto. Jacobs had publicly endorsed Gomberg.

Among his accomplishments as mayor of Toronto, Lastman brought World Youth Day to Toronto in 2002. He also succeeded in pushing the construction of the TTC Sheppard line, the first new subway line in decades. He played a key role in developing the Yonge and Sheppard area, notably in the negotiations that had the Empress Walk condominium complex developed and two leading schools refurbished, all without using public funds.

On January 14, 2003, Lastman announced that he would not run for re-election, citing deteriorating health. On November 10, 2003, David Miller was elected out of a field of five leading candidates to succeed Lastman as city mayor.

Lastman sometimes commented publicly on Toronto affairs, such as in 2007 when the city faced a $575 million shortfall and struggled to make service cuts to immediately save $100 million. Lastman also sympathized that provincial downloading had burdened Toronto, but also criticized Miller's service cuts as hurting the quality of life while not going far enough to solve the shortfall. Lastman pointed out that spending had increased by $1.5 billion since he left office, and suggested that councillors had to consider measures such as contracting out services and cutting staff.

== Controversies ==
In 1993, Lastman saw Bill Clinton impersonator Tim Watters on television, and shortly afterwards contacted him and arranged for a commercial to be shot. The commercial featured Watters dressed as Clinton delivering the classic Nooobody! line. While merely a mildly amusing commercial to most of the viewing public, Lastman's move attracted attention, as he soon received a letter from the White House requesting that he "cease and desist all unauthorized use of the likeness of the President of the United States of America in advertising of commercial services and products". Lastman refused to stop airing the commercials, and even produced several more, featuring both Watters and Hillary Clinton impersonator Elaine Kouba. "Last time I checked," Lastman quipped, "this was Canada, not the 51st state."

After his wife Marilyn was caught shoplifting from an Eaton's store in Toronto, he threatened to kill CITY-TV reporter Adam Vaughan unless he stopped reporting on his family.

In June 2001, shortly before leaving for Mombasa, Kenya to support Toronto's bid for the 2008 Summer Olympics, he ostensibly jokingly said to a reporter "What the hell do I want to go to a place like Mombasa?... I'm sort of scared about going out there, but the wife is really nervous. I just see myself in a pot of boiling water with all these natives dancing around me." The remarks sparked a firestorm of controversy, with much speculation that they would offend African IOC members and endanger Toronto's bid. Lastman apologized profusely for those remarks. IOC Vice-president Dick Pound later stated that the comments did not affect the outcome of the bid.

In January 2002, Lastman was ridiculed for hugging and shaking hands with members of the Hells Angels motorcycle gang when they held a convention in Toronto. Lastman later claimed that he did not know that the Hells Angels were involved in selling illegal drugs.

During the 2003 SARS outbreak, Lastman did an interview on CNN. When asked about what the World Health Organization was doing about the outbreak, Lastman replied, "They don't know what they're talking about. I don't know who this group is. I've never heard of them before."

== Personal life and death ==
Having met during the late 1940s when they were both teenagers, 19-year-old Lastman and his childhood sweetheart Marilyn Bornstein, three years his junior, got married in 1952. The couple's first child, son Dale, was born in March 1957. Their second son, Blayne, was born during the early 1960s.

In 1988, with Lastman in his seventh consecutive term as mayor of North York, more than 15 years after he first took the office, his wife Marilyn decided to enter local politics in her own right by running for the council seat representing North York's Ward 13. At the November 1988 municipal election, incumbent Lastman ended up securing his eight mayoral term, while she lost to former school trustee Bob Bradley.

In 1989, Lastman contracted hepatitis C during a surgery. He was one of thousands of Canadians infected from tainted blood products provided by Canadian Red Cross in the 1980s and early 1990s. In his final year in mayoral office, Lastman had spent much of it dealing with his medical conditions, including a bout with cancer.

In late November 2000, weeks after being re-elected for a second term as Toronto mayor—and facing an impending $6 million retroactive child support lawsuit by former Bad Boy Furniture employee Grace Louie claiming to have been Lastman's 14-year mistress who bore him two illegitimate children, Kim (born in September 1958) and Todd Louie (born in March 1962), both of whom were also named as plaintiffs—Lastman called a press conference where, flanked by his wife of 47 years, he admitted to the extramarital affair with Louie while neither confirming nor denying paternity of the two children. Addressing the media, Lastman further claimed to have disclosed the affair to his wife and kids "some years ago" and that they had given him their "unqualified forgiveness". Grace, Kim, and Todd Louie's lawsuit against Lastman further alleged "neglect and mental suffering", claiming Kim and Todd grew up in poverty while Mel and Marilyn Lastman's sons enjoyed a life of privilege. Various details of the Lastman-Louie affair that began in 1957 and ended in 1971 soon became public, including their 1966 trip to Greece, Spain, and Morocco. It also came out that in 1974, three years after their relationship had ended, Louie accepted a Can$27,500 (equivalent to $172,347 in 2025) settlement from Lastman in return for signing a legal release document freeing him from allegations or suggestions that he is the father of the two children.

Louie's lawsuit was dismissed in May 2001 by the Ontario Superior Court of Justice judge Mary Lou Benotto who, though not challenging claims by Todd and Kim Louie that Lastman fathered them, ruled that it was too late to claim retroactive child support. The plaintiffs appealed the decision in June 2001; and the case went before the Ontario Court of Appeal where it was dismissed in September 2002 by judge Marc Rosenberg who also ruled the claim "too late" along with an explanation that "child support can not be claimed decades after the plaintiffs are no longer dependents (children)". The plaintiffs appealed the appeals court ruling, taking the case to the Canadian Supreme Court where it was dismissed in March 2003.

Lastman's wife, Marilyn died after a brief illness on January 1, 2020, at the age of 84. One year later, Lastman died of heart failure on December 11, 2021, at the age of 88. He and his wife Marilyn were both laid to rest at the Mount Sinai Memorial Park in North York, Toronto.

== See also ==
- Moose in the City
