= Don Valley East =

Don Valley East may refer to:

- Don Valley East (federal electoral district), federal riding in Toronto, Ontario, Canada
- Don Valley East (provincial electoral district), provincial riding in Toronto, Ontario, Canada
- Ward 16 Don Valley East, municipal ward in Toronto, Ontario, Canada
