= Regal Heights =

- Neighbourhood
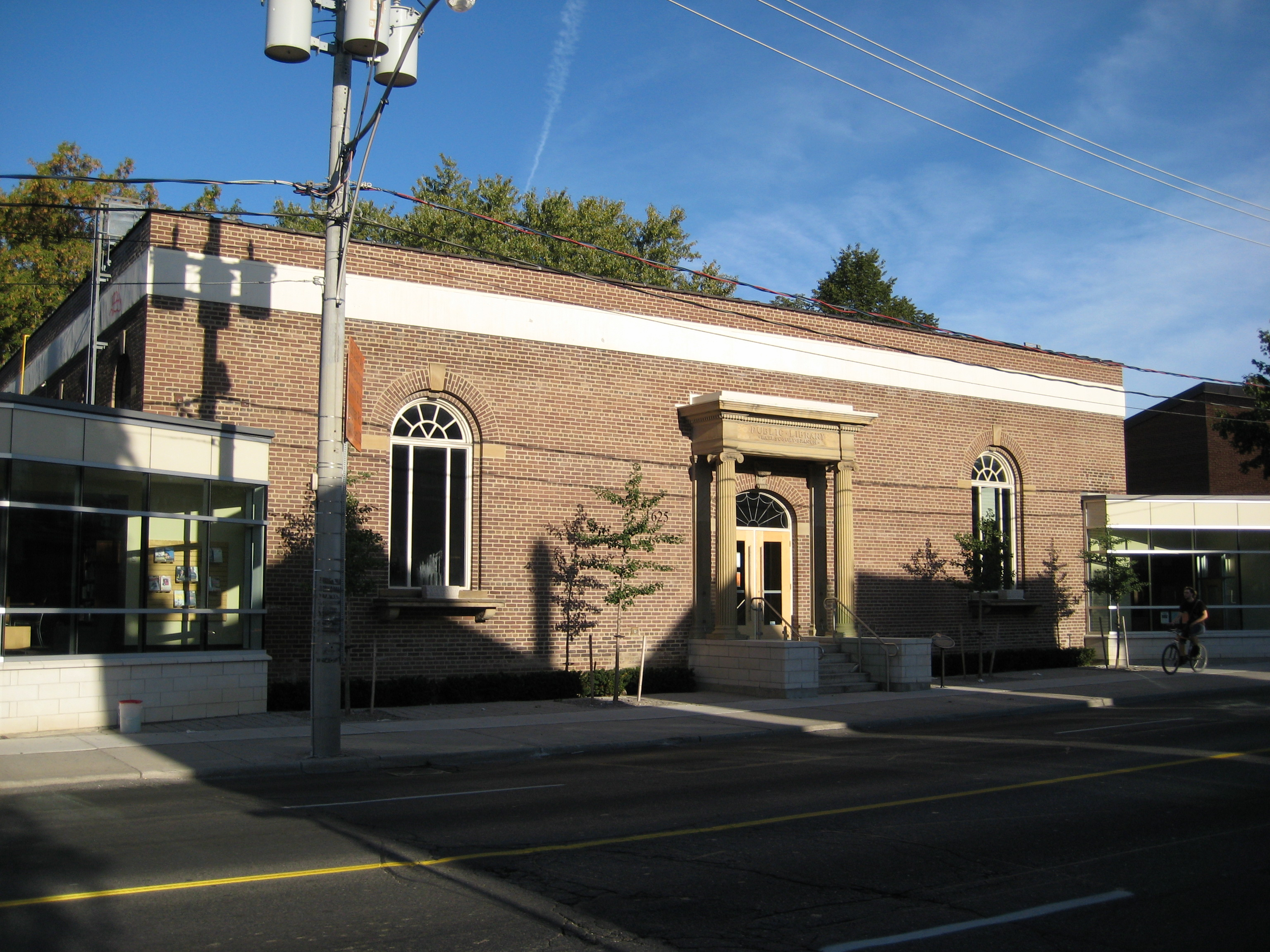
- Dufferin-St. Clair branch of the Toronto Public Library in Regal Heights

- Location of Regal Heights within Toronto
- Coordinates: 43°40′34″N 79°25′28″W
- Country: Canada
- Province: Ontario
- City: Toronto
- Community: Toronto

Regal Heights is a neighbourhood located in Toronto, Ontario, Canada. It is classified as a part of the Corso Italia-Davenport neighbourhood by the City of Toronto. and is situated on the western crest of the Davenport escarpment. This neighbourhood has many distinguishing characteristics including very large turn of the century houses, winding tree- lined streets, and an elevation atop the Davenport escarpment. Its main commercial shopping area is along St. Clair Avenue West between Dufferin Street and Oakwood Avenue.

== History ==
=== European Settlements ===
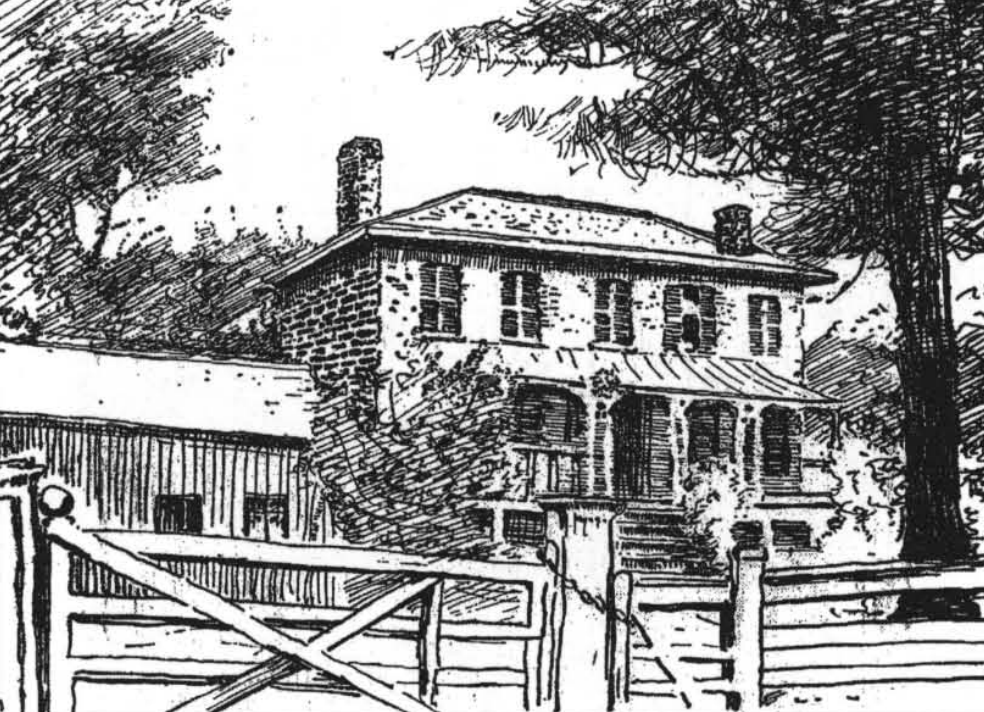
In 1830, Bartholomew Bull built the first brick house in York Township, north of Davenport Road.

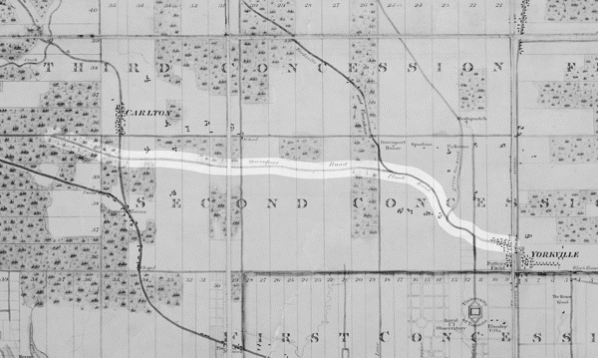
A map of the area from 1852, with Davenport Road highlighted. Previously used as a footpath used by the First Nations, it was widened in the 1850s, and named Davenport Road.

In 1824, an Irishman, Bartholomew Bull, bought land east of Dufferin Street and south of St. Clair Avenue West. He first built a log cabin and cleared land for a farm. In 1830, he constructed the first brick house in York Township, and called it Springmount.

The house was located north of Davenport and west of Springmount Avenue, with a view of the lake. During the winter, the Bull children would dam a nearby tributary of Garrison Creek to create a skating rink. Prior to the 1860s, the Bull family built a new house near the corner of Dufferin Street and St. Clair Avenue West. When Springmount was demolished in 1883, Bartholomew's oldest son saved a hand-carved bookcase as a family treasure.

Once he built his brick home in 1830, Bartholomew Bull volunteered the use of his log cabin not only as the first school in the neighbourhood but also as a site where travelling Methodist clergy could preach. This was the first church in Regal Heights.

Life was hard on early Ontario farms. The John Carroll wrote about his youth on his brother's farm in York County in the 1820s recalling "frugal fare and work, work, work." (John Carroll, My Boy's Life, Toronto: 1882 quoted in Peter Baskerville, Ontario - Image, Identity and Power, Toronto: 2002.)

In the 1850s, the old Indian path at the base of the hill was widened and called Davenport Road, after the village of Davenport, which was established near Davenport Road and Symington Avenue—west of today's Regal Heights neighbourhood. Although originally improved by the colonial government, for many years during the 19th century the road was privately owned and people using it had to pay tolls. The 1830s cottage of the toll keeper at Bathurst Street and Davenport Road survives and is located in a park at the northwest corner of the intersection.

Travel on Davenport Road was not easy in the 19th century. A grandson of Bull described the road as "an epic of mud." Davenport Hill was a challenge as well. Locals used to observe that horses tired from pulling wagons along muddy Davenport Road would drop to the ground at the thought of having to pull a load up the hill.

By the 1890s, the Bull family sold off the farm at Dufferin and St. Clair so that the land could be developed as city lots. Roads were surveyed and schools built following 1910, however the widespread construction of homes did not occur until the 1920s.

Between 1900 and 1914, the land northwest of Regal Heights was developed by British immigrants who would buy property and build temporary shelters for their families before constructing their homes. This area was known as the shacklands. Judi Coburn has written The Shacklands (Toronto: Sumach Press, 1998), about the life of a girl growing up in the neighbourhood.

=== Twentieth century ===
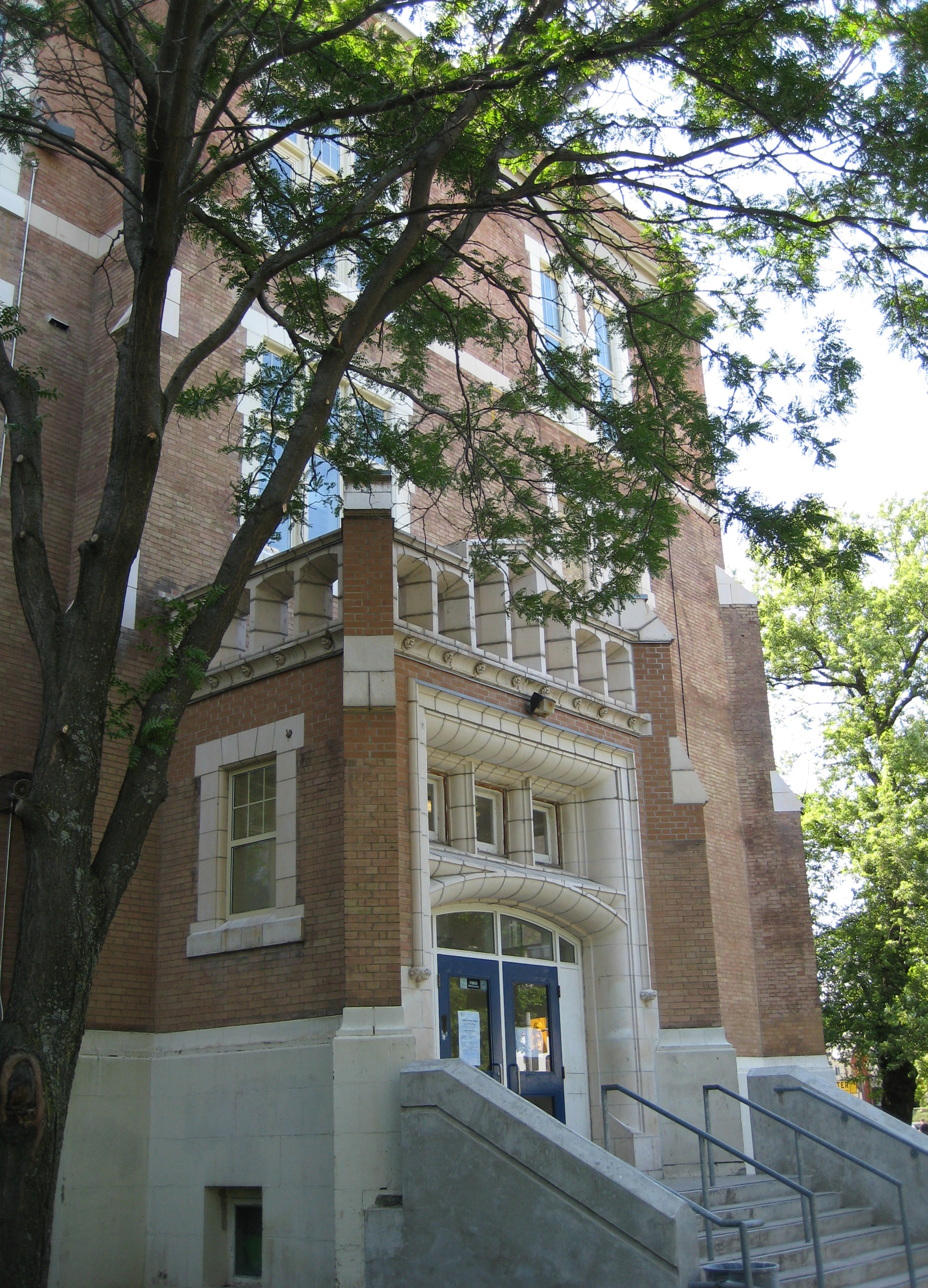
Oakwood Collegiate Institute is a public secondary school located in the northern area of Regal Heights. Opened in 1908, it is operated by the Toronto District School Board.

During the First World War (1914-1918), the City of Toronto expanded as new factories were built to meet the needs of Canada's war effort. In 1916, the Ford Motor Company built a factory at the corner of Dupont Street and Christie Street. The following year, Canadian Aeroplanes Ltd., opened the largest aircraft factory in the British Empire at Dupont Street and Dufferin Street.

The people working in these factories needed homes to live in. Brick homes - both detached and semi-detached—were built in the Regal Heights neighbourhood for both workers and executives. Many homes featured porches, while their interiors were graced with wood paneling, and leaded and stained glass influenced by the arts and crafts movement.

Building these homes was relatively easy because during the term of Toronto Mayor George Reginald Geary (1910-1912), streets were laid out and construction started on two schools, Regal Road elementary and Oakwood Collegiate Institute. Davenport Road was paved, making it a safe, swift link between the neighbourhood and downtown Toronto.

During this period, Toronto artists were attracted to the scenery and the colour of a growing community. Before he became a leading member of the Group of Seven, Lawren Harris painted pictures of the homes and temporary shacks of residents in the Bathurst Street and St. Clair Avenue West area.

In 1926 and 1932, George Agnew Reid and Doris McCarthy painted murals in the Dufferin/St. Clair Branch of the Toronto Public Library. Although these art treasures were painted over in 1964 and considered lost forever; they were restored in 2008 as part of an expansion of the branch by the public library board. The illustration below is "The Family", one of a series of panels painted by Reid who described his goal to present community life in an idealistic fashion through a series of pastoral landscape. The murals include the names of 12 British authors and eight literary themes throughout the composition.

McCarthy's murals were painted in the children's club room in 1932 and feature bright, energetic scenes from familiar British and American fairy tales, such as Jack the Giant Killer, Little Red Riding Hood and Cinderella.

Prior to the expansion of the branch library, local residents David Self and John McAuley worked with the local librarian and the library board to develop a strategy for restoring the murals and recruited conservationist Laslo Cser to show how this could be done. The Regal Heights Residents Association raised funds to support this work and was recognized for its effort by Heritage Toronto in the 2008 heritage awards. The restoration of the murals is a symbol of the community's active involvement in the creative arts, encouraged by local organizations such as Art Starts.

Regal Heights thrived during the 1920s. In the 1940s, the demand for housing grew quickly and some of the larger homes were subdivided to provide privacy for individual members of extended families, or extra income for the owner.

The population of Regal Heights has changed over the years. Initially home to many British immigrants, it was also home to a significant Jewish community during the 1930s, 1940s and 1950s, many of whom were merchants on St. Clair Ave. In the postwar years, the area changed dramatically with an influx of immigrants from Italy. In recent years, the area has become more multicultural, including many Latin Americans.

An active neighbourhood in Canada's largest city, Regal Heights provides the kind of environment that encourages people to do their best. Nathan Phillips, a Mayor of Toronto, lived in Regal Heights during the 1940s and '50s.

Marilyn Bell, the first swimmer to conquer Lake Ontario, lived in the neighbourhood as a child and swam in a pool now occupied by the parking lot for a local supermarket. Charmaine Crooks, a successful amateur athlete who has represented Canada at the Olympics, the Pan-American Games and the Commonwealth Games, grew up in Regal Heights.

== Geography ==
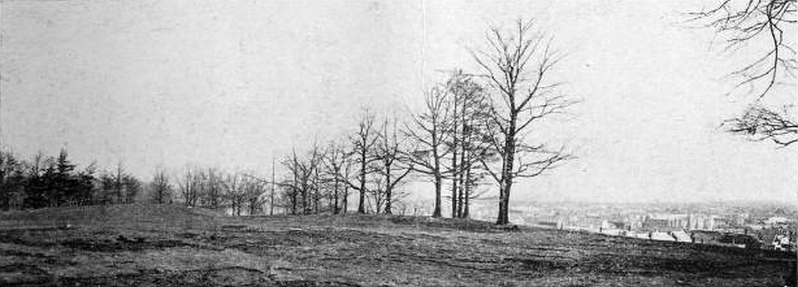
View of Toronto from Regal Heights, 1920.jpg

While much of Toronto is flat land, unique geographic features set the Regal Heights neighbourhood apart. The most prominent is the 50 to 75 foot bluff—called Davenport Hill or the Davenport Escarpment—just north of Davenport Road which marks the shoreline of a prehistoric lake that was formed at the end of the Ice Age, about 12,000 years ago.

Today the bluff gives homes on Regal Road a view of Lake Ontario, the Niagara Peninsula and the city of St. Catherines, and helps capture cooling breezes from the lake on hot summer days.

Tributaries of Garrison Creek, which supplied water to Fort York—the military camp that helped found Toronto in the 1790s—also shaped the local landscape. Springmount, Alberta and Mount Royal Avenues were built on top of or close to the actual creek bed. Garrison Creek was treated as a garbage dump in the 19th century and to protect public health it was put in an underground sewer pipe between 1880 and 1914.

Gardeners in the area find the soil in the Regal Heights neighbourhood to be largely heavy clay. Treated well, the land can be productive and during the 19th century small farms and market gardens were established to feed surrounding communities such as the Villages of Carlton, Davenport, Brockton and Yorkville, as well as the City of Toronto.

Before farmers tilled the land, stands of white oak and pine covered the landscape. A handful of century old white oak trees can still be found in the neighbourhood. Towering Norway Maple trees, planted by the city in the 1920s, shade the front yards of many homes.

In addition to cash crops, settlers planted ornamental gardens around their homes. In 1853, printer, editor, politician and businessman, George Thomson bought a house in the nearby Carleton Village, at St. Clair Avenue West and Old Weston Road. He recalled growing lilac, lobelias, orchids, prairie rose, and cacti, as well as bushes such as spiraea and St. Johns-Wort.

== See also ==
- List of neighbourhoods in Toronto
