= Don Valley West =

Don Valley West may refer to:

- Don Valley West (federal electoral district), federal riding in Toronto, Ontario, Canada
- Don Valley West (provincial electoral district), provincial riding in Toronto, Ontario, Canada
- Ward 15 Don Valley West, municipal ward in Toronto, Ontario, Canada
