= Ward 15 Don Valley West =

Municipal council district in Toronto, Ontario, Canada

- Constituency for the Toronto City Council
- Location of Ward 15 in Toronto
- City: Toronto
- Population: 102,510 (2016)

Current constituency
- Created: 2018
- Councillor: Rachel Chernos Lin
- Community council: North York
- Created from: Ward 22; Ward 25; Ward 26
- First contested: 2018 election
- Last contested: 2026
- Ward profile: www.toronto.ca/ward-15-don-valley-west/

Ward 15 Don Valley West is a municipal electoral division in Toronto, Ontario, Canada for Toronto City Council. It was last contested in 2026, with Rachel Chernos Lin being elected councillor.

== Boundaries ==
On August 14, 2018, the Government of Ontario redrew municipal boundaries via the Better Local Government Act, 2018, S.O. 2018, c. 11 - Bill 5. This means that the 25 provincial electoral districts and the 25 municipal wards in Toronto currently share the same geographic borders.

Defined in legislation as:

Consisting of that part of the City of Toronto described as follows: commencing at the intersection of Highway No. 401 with Leslie Street; thence generally southerly along said street to Eglinton Avenue East; thence westerly along said avenue to the Don River West Branch; thence generally southeasterly along said branch to Overlea Boulevard; thence easterly along said boulevard to Don Mills Road; thence southerly along said road to the Don River East Branch; thence generally southwesterly along said branch and the Don River to Pottery Road; thence northwesterly and southwesterly along said road to Bayview Avenue; thence generally northerly and northwesterly along said avenue to the Canadian Pacific Railway situated northwesterly of Nesbitt Drive; thence southwesterly along said railway to the Beltline Trail situated in the Moore Park Ravine; thence generally northwesterly along said trail to the southerly boundary of the Mount Pleasant Cemetery; thence generally westerly along said boundary to Mount Pleasant Road; thence northerly along said road to Broadway Avenue; thence westerly along said avenue to Yonge Street; thence northerly along said street to Highway No. 401; thence northeasterly and easterly along said highway to the point of commencement.

== History ==
=== 2018 boundary adjustment ===
Toronto municipal ward boundaries were significantly modified in 2018 during the election campaign. Ultimately the new ward structure was used and later upheld by the Supreme Court of Canada in 2021.

The current ward is made up of parts of the former Ward 22 St Paul's, the former Ward 25 Don Valley West and southwest portion of the former Ward 26 Don Valley West. From 1988 to 2000, much of the area was covered by North York Centre South Ward, which was represented on Metro Toronto Council until amalgamation in 1997, then on Toronto City Council for one term. Prior to amalgamation, the area was represented by wards 6 (west of Yonge Street) and 8 (east of Yonge) on North York Council.

== Geography ==
Ward 15 is part of the North York Community Council.

Before the 2025 federal election, Don Valley West's boundaries mirrored its federal and provincial counterparts: its west border is Mount Pleasant Road and Yonge Street, its north border is Highway 401, its east border is Leslie Street, the Don River and part of Don Mills Road, and the south border is the Don River and the Beltline Trail.

== Councillors ==
Council term	Member	
Council term	Ward 6 (North York City Council)	Ward 8 (North York City Council)
1966–1969	Alex McGivern	Walter Cassels
1969–1972	John Knox	Bob Roche
1972–1974	John Knox	Bob Roche
1974–1976	George Laceby	Bob Roche
1976–1978	Milton Berger	Alan Heisey
1978–1980	Milton Berger	Alan Heisey
1980–1982	Milton Berger	Andy Borins
1982–1985	Milton Berger	Andy Borins
1985–1988	Milton Berger	Bev Salmon
1988–1991	Milton Berger	Joanne Flint
1991–1994	Milton Berger	Joanne Flint
1994–1997	Milton Berger	Joanne Flint
	North York Centre South (Metro Council)	
1988–1991	Bev Salmon	
1991–1994	Bev Salmon	
1994–1997	Bev Salmon	
	Ward 9 North York Centre South	
1997–2000	Joanne Flint, Milton Berger	
	Ward 25 Don Valley West	Ward 26 Don Valley West
2000–2003	Joanne Flint	Jane Pitfield
2003–2006	Cliff Jenkins	Jane Pitfield
2006–2010	Cliff Jenkins	John Parker
2010–2014	Jaye Robinson	John Parker
2014–2018	Jaye Robinson	Jon Burnside
	Ward 15 Don Valley West	
2018–2022	Jaye Robinson	
2022–2026	Jaye Robinson	
2022–2026	Jaye Robinson (until 2024), Rachel Chernos Lin (from 2024)	
2026–2030	Rachel Chernos Lin	

== Election results ==
=== 2026 ===
Candidate	Votes	%	minus
Rachel Chernos Lin (X)	23,434	67.47	12.71* ▲
Sheena Sharp	7,863	22.64	20.20* ▲
Denis Tsang	3,437	9.90	–

Compared to by-election*

=== 2024 by-election ===
Following the death of councillor Jaye Robinson due to cancer, a by-election was held November 4, 2024, to replace her.

Candidates

- Rachel Chernos Lin - Member of the Toronto District School Board. Endorsed by Liberal MPP Stephanie Bowman and Ward 12 City Councillor Josh Matlow.
- Habiba Desai - International development consultant. Ran as an independent candidate in the 2023 Scarborough—Guildwood provincial by-election.
- Anthony Furey - Former Toronto Sun columnist. Ran for mayor in the 2023 Toronto mayoral by-election
- Peter Handjis - Ran for mayor in the 2022 Toronto mayoral election and the 2023 by-election. Ran for city council in the 2023 Ward 20 Scarborough Southwest by-election.
- Syed Jaffery - Ran for the People's Party of Canada in the 2021 Canadian federal election, and has run for Mississauga City Council, ran in the Ward 20 Scarborough Southwest by-election, ran in the 2024 Mississauga mayoral by-election
- Dhruv Jain - Director of transit policy for TTC chair, Jamaal Myers. Former staffer for Liberal MPP Stephanie Bowman. Executive vice president of the Don Valley West Provincial Liberal Association.
- Mario Lamanna
- Cleveland Marshall - Ran for mayor in the 2023 Toronto mayoral by-election and ran for city council in the 2022 Toronto municipal election in Ward 13 Toronto Centre
- ~~Angela Lindow - Ran for city council in the 2022 Toronto municipal election in Ward 17 Don Valley North~~ (dropped out)
- Sam Robinson - Son of councillor Jaye Robinson.
- Evan Sambasivam - Mental health advocate. Former Legislative Assistant to Gary Anandasangaree, and Regional Advisor to Diane Lebouthillier, both federal Liberal cabinet ministers. Ran in Ward 8 Eglinton—Lawrence in 2022. Nephew of former Liberal MP Deb Matthews.
- Shakhlo Sharipova
- Sheena Sharp - Architect and environmental activist. Ran in this ward in 2022. Ran for the Green Party of Ontario in Don Valley West in the 2022 Ontario general election.
- Jason Stevens - Ran for city council in the 2010 Toronto municipal election in Ward 19: Trinity—Spadina
- Lesley Stoyan - Food and lifestyle educator. Community organizer.
- Daniel Trayes - Ran for city council in the 2022 Ward 22 Scarborough—Agincourt by-election. Ran for city council in the 2014 Toronto municipal election in Ward 30 - Toronto—Danforth
- Calvin Xu - Ran for city council in the 2022 Toronto municipal election in Ward 17 Don Valley North

2024 Results

Candidate	Vote	%
Rachel Chernos Lin	12,899	54.76
Anthony Furey	7,343	31.17
Sam Robinson	1,271	5.40
Sheena Sharp	575	2.44
Lesley Stoyan	345	1.45
Shakhlo Sharipova	301	1.28
Evan Sambasivam	186	0.79
Habiba Desai	137	0.58
Syed Jaffery	124	0.53
Dhruv Jain	123	0.52
Calvin Xu	72	0.31
Jason Stevens	70	0.30
Cleveland Marshall	37	0.16
Peter Handjis	36	0.15
Mario Lamanna	31	0.13
Daniel Trayes	5	0.02

=== 2022 ===
2022 Toronto municipal election, Ward 15 Don Valley West
Candidate	Vote	%
Jaye Robinson	16,142	74.22
Sheena Sharp	2,780	12.78
David Ricci	2,438	11.21
Gregory Vaz	389	1.79

=== 2018 ===
Ward 15 was first contested during the 2018 municipal election, with candidates including Ward 25 incumbent Jaye Robinson and Ward 26 incumbent Jon Burnside. Robinson was ultimately elected with 49.22 per cent of the vote.

2018 Toronto municipal election, Ward 15 Don Valley West
Candidate	Vote	%
Jaye Robinson	16,219	49.22%
Jon Burnside	14,440	43.82
Tanweer Khan	1,309	3.97
Nikola Streker	583	1.77
Minh Le	404	1.23
Total	32,955	100%
Source: City of Toronto

=== 2014 ===
Ward 25 Don Valley West
Candidate	Vote	%
Jaye Robinson	19,066	83.24
Richard Friedman	1,891	8.26
Tanya Hostler	850	3.71
Kim Diep	564	2.46
Nikola Streker	534	2.33

Ward 26 Don Valley West
Candidate	Vote	%
Jon Burnside	9,415	42.73
John Parker	6,167	27.99
Ishrath Velshi	3,055	13.86
David Sparrow	1,786	8.11
Wasim Vania	1,033	4.69
Dimitre Popov	578	2.62

=== 2010 ===
Ward 25 Don Valley West
Candidate	Vote	%
Jaye Robinson	9,258	45.49
Cliff Jenkins	8,756	43.03
Joanne Dickins	1,968	9.67
Tanya Hostler	368	1.81

Ward 26 Don Valley West
Candidate	Vote	%
John Parker	6,203	31.28
Jon Burnside	5,788	29.19
Mohamed Dhanani	5,627	28.37
Yunus Pandor	1,452	7.32
Tanvir Ahmed	377	1.90
Shaukat Malik	216	1.09
Nawab Salim Khan	169	0.85

=== 2006 ===
Ward 25 Don Valley West
Candidate	Vote	%
Cliff Jenkins	7,954	58.30
Tony Dickins	2,788	20.43
Robertson Boyle	971	7.12
Peter Kapsalis	967	7.09
John Blair	964	7.07

Ward 26 Don Valley West
Candidate	Vote	%
John Parker	3,369	20.11
Mohamed Dhanani	3,155	18.83
Abdul Ingar	2,940	17.55
Geoff Kettel	1,372	8.19
Natalie Maniates	1,336	7.98
David Thomas	1,095	6.54
John Masterson	887	5.29
Michele Carroll-Smith	743	4.44
Debbie Lechter	577	3.44
Csaba Vegh	371	2.21
Muhammad Alam	261	1.56
Fred Williams	256	1.53
Bahar Aminvaziri	215	1.28
Orhan Aybars	99	0.59
Raza Jabbar	76	0.45

=== 2003 ===
Ward 25 Don Valley West
Candidate	Vote	%
Cliff Jenkins	4,859	26.04
Jaye Robinson	4,779	25.61
Tim Flynn	2,240	12.00
Barbara Krieger	1,858	9.96
Jon Williams	1,648	8.83
William Rauenbusch	1,575	8.44
Stewart Weinstein	1,283	6.87
Nancy Loewen	420	2.25

Ward 26 Don Valley West
Candidate	Vote	%
Jane Pitfield	13,602	86.63
Muhammad Alam	1,366	8.70
Orhan Aybars	733	4.67

=== 2000 ===
Ward 25 Don Valley West
Candidate	Vote	%
Joanne Flint	11,124	79.37
John Cameron	2,891	20.63

Ward 26 Don Valley West
Candidate	Vote	%
Jane Pitfield	11,058	70.70
Don Yuill	3,421	21.87
Muhammad Bajwa	1,162	7.43

=== 1997 ===
Ward 9 – North York Centre South; Two to be elected
Candidate	Vote	%
Joanne Flint	16,447	40.07
Milton Berger	12,370	30.14
Dick Chapman	8,484	20.67
Stuart Ian Weinstein	3,740	9.11

=== 1994 ===
North York Centre South
Candidate	Vote	%
Bev Salmon	Acclaimed	

=== 1991 ===
North York Centre South
Candidate	Vote	%
Bev Salmon	Acclaimed	

=== 1988 ===
North York Centre South
Candidate	Vote	%
Bev Salmon	10,618	59.51
Gordon Chong	7,223	40.49

== See also ==
- Municipal elections in Canada
- Municipal government of Toronto
- List of Toronto municipal elections
