= Jaye Robinson =

Canadian municipal politician (1962–2024)

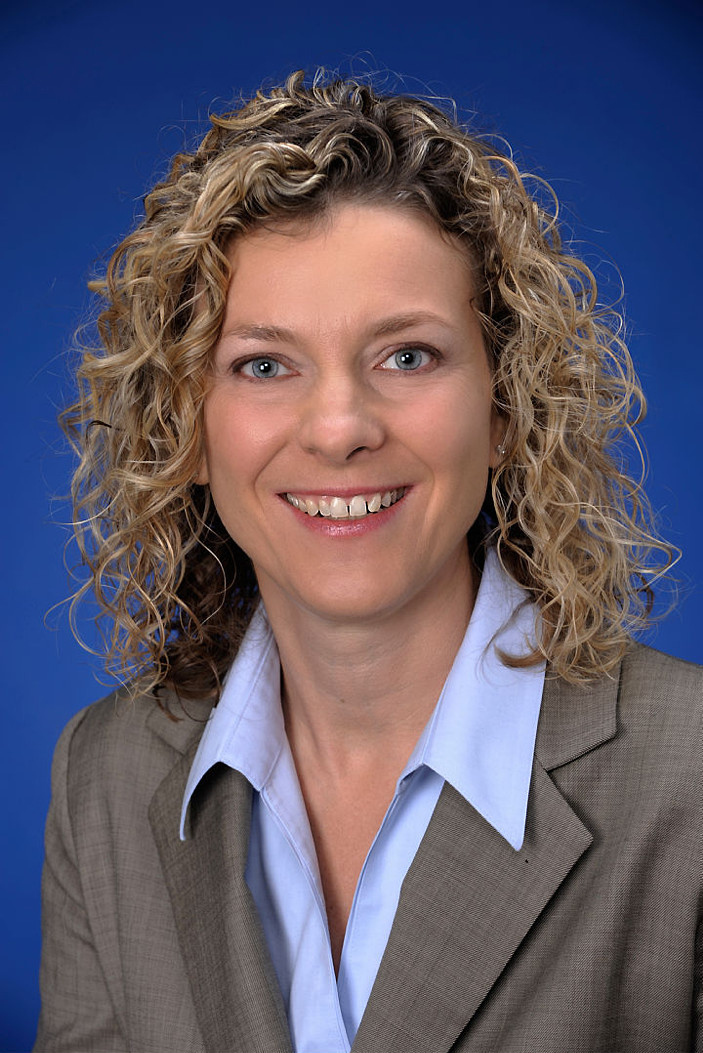
- Robinson in 2010

Chair of the Toronto Transit Commission
- In office December 13, 2018 – November 23, 2022
- Preceded by: Josh Colle
- Succeeded by: Jon Burnside

Chair of Public Works and Infrastructure Committee
- In office December 4, 2014 – December 12, 2019
- Preceded by: Denzil Minnan-Wong
- Succeeded by: Committee dissolved

Toronto City Councillor for Ward 15 Don Valley West
- In office December 1, 2018 – May 16, 2024
- Preceded by: Ward created
- Succeeded by: Rachel Chernos Lin

Toronto City Councillor for Ward 25 Don Valley West
- In office December 1, 2010 – December 1, 2018
- Preceded by: Cliff Jenkins
- Succeeded by: Ward dissolved

Personal details
- Born: Janet Joy Robinson; December 7, 1962 Orangeville, Ontario, Canada
- Died: May 16, 2024 (aged 61) Toronto, Ontario, Canada
- Spouse: William Crossland

Janet Joy "Jaye" Robinson (December 7, 1962 – May 16, 2024) was a Canadian politician who served as a member of the Toronto City Council from 2010 to 2024. She was the chair of the Toronto Transit Commission (TTC) from 2018 to 2022. Robinson represented Ward 15 Don Valley West. She died in office on May 16, 2024.

== Background ==
Robinson was born in Orangeville, Ontario on December 7, 1962 to John “Jake” and Shirley Robinson (née Jackson). Her parents named her Janet Joy but she went by Jaye. Her great-grandfather, John R. (Black Jack) Robinson, was editor of the Toronto Telegram from 1888 to 1928. Robinson’s grand aunt was Toronto Telegram political columnist, Judith Robinson. She spent 20 years working for the City of Toronto, including as the director of events with the Economic Development and Culture Division, where she helped to organize Nuit Blanche.

== Political career ==
Robinson ran for councillor in Ward 25 in the 2003 city council election against the incumbent Cliff Jenkins. The close race was marked by an election night error. The city website announced that, with all the ballots in, Jenkins had lost to Robinson by 30 votes. However, only 90 per cent of the votes had actually been counted, and by the time the full count was completed two hours later, Jenkins had pulled into the lead by 80 votes and held on to win.

Robinson ran again in Ward 25 in the 2010 city council election. It was a rematch of the 2003 election. This time, she narrowly defeated Jenkins, one of several incumbents that lost their seats in this election cycle.

Robinson was re-elected in the 2014 city council election. During the 2014–2018 council term she held several important committee positions serving as Chair of the Public Works and Infrastructure Committee (PWIC) and as a member of the Executive Committee. As PWIC’s chair she brought in and was in charge of the city’s first comprehensive road safety program known as Vision Zero.

Robinson ran again for Councillor for Toronto City Council in the 2018 municipal election in the newly constituted Ward 15 Don Valley West, which has the same boundaries as the federal and provincial ridings with the same name. She defeated the incumbent councillor for former Ward 26, Jon Burnside.

Following the election, Mayor John Tory announced that Robinson would serve as the chair of the TTC, a position she held until 2022 when Tory appointed her to lead the city's plan for the 2026 FIFA World Cup. She continued to lead this team after Olivia Chow was elected in the 2023 mayoral by-election. Alex Bozikovic, The Globe and Mail's architecture critic, described Jaye Robinson as "furiously anti-development".

== Illness and death ==
Robinson was diagnosed with breast cancer and took a temporary leave of absence from council on October 29, 2019. She returned to council meetings in November 2020, although her attendance was done remotely due to the COVID-19 pandemic. Robinson died in office on May 16, 2024, at the age of 61. On June 26, 2024, the City Council approved a November 4, 2024 by-election to fill her seat. Her son Sam Robinson ran in the by-election and came in third. He lost to school board trustee Rachel Chernos Lin.

== Jaye Robinson Park ==
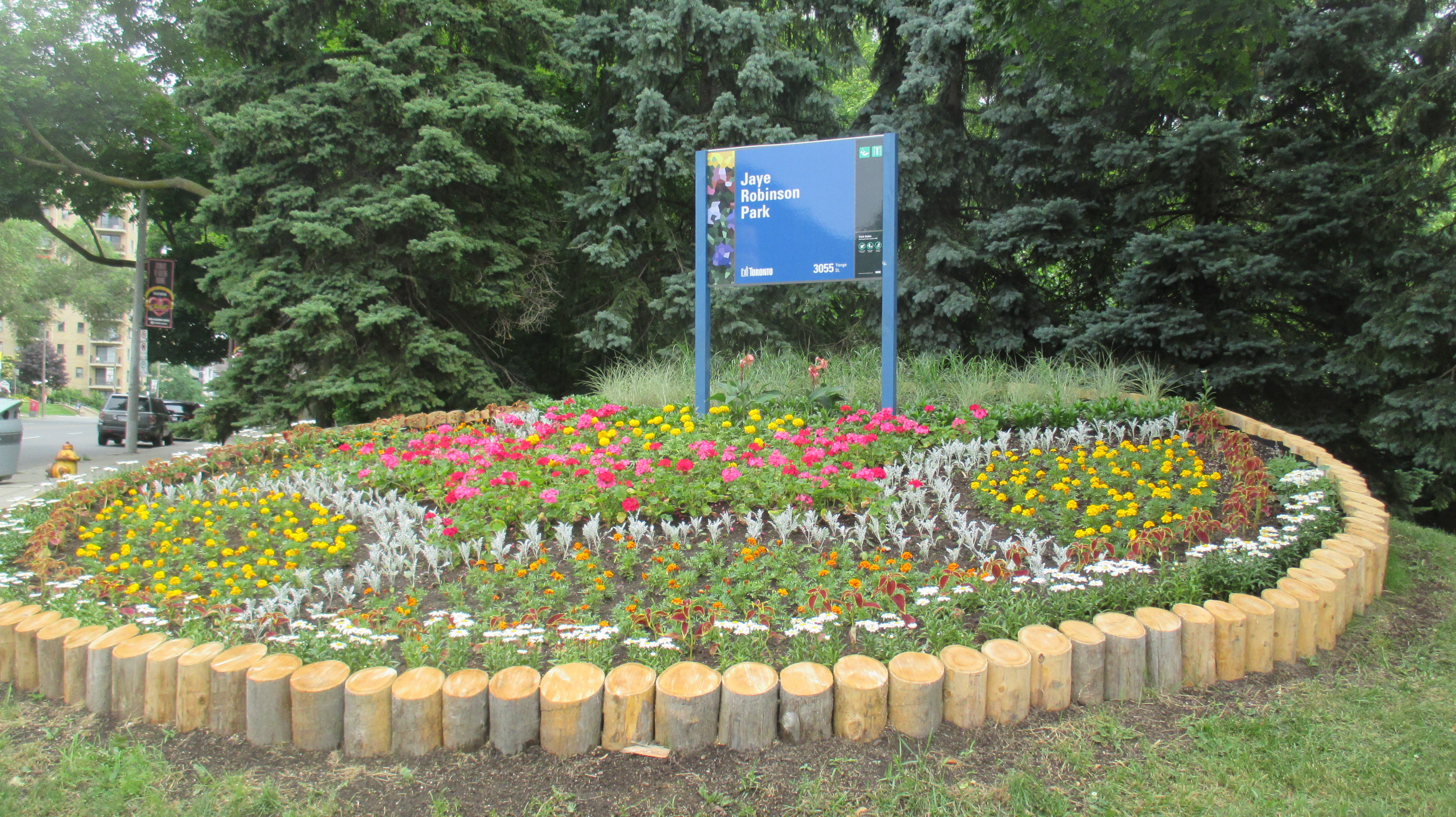
Jaye Robinson Park: corner of Yonge St & St Edmunds Dr

On April 24, 2025, Toronto city council voted unanimously to rename a portion of Lawrence Park Ravine as Jaye Robinson Park as a memorial to the late councillor. Councillor Rachel Chernos Lin said of Robinson: "Opening new parks was one of her favourite parts of the job." Robinson's widowed husband said, "Parks and trees were her passion and this is a park that has a lot of meaning to the family."

The park spans two city blocks and is bounded by Yonge Street, Lawrence Avenue East and St. Edmond's Drive. It is bisected into a north and south segments by Lympstone Avenue. The northern segment is adjacent to the Locke Library and across the street from Lawrence subway station The 2.5-hectare (6.2-acre) park contains a playground, a shade structure, outdoor fitness equipment and several picnic tables and benches.

== Electoral history ==
2022 Toronto municipal election, Ward 15
Candidate	Vote	%
Jaye Robinson (X)	16,142	74.22
Sheena Sharp	2,780	12.78
David Ricci	2,438	11.21
Gregory Vaz	389	1.79
Source: City of Toronto

2018 Toronto municipal election, Ward 15 Don Valley West
Candidate	Votes	Vote share
Jaye Robinson	16,219	49.22%
Jon Burnside	14,440	43.82%
Tanweer Khan	1,309	3.97%
Nikola Streker	583	1.77%
Minh Le	404	1.23%
Total	32,955	100%
Source: City of Toronto

2014 Toronto election, Ward 25
Candidate	Votes	%
Jaye Robinson	19,066	83.24%
Richard Friedman	1,891	8.26%
Tanya Hostler	850	3.71%
Kim Diep	564	2.46%
Nikola Streker	534	2.33%
Total	22,905	100.00%

2010 Toronto election, Ward 25
Candidate	Votes	%
Jaye Robinson	9,258	45.49%
Cliff Jenkins (incumbent)	8,756	43.02%
Joanne Dickins	1,968	9.67%
Tanya Hostler	368	1.80%
Total	20,350	100%

Official results.
