= Minnan =

Minnan or Banlam may refer to:

- Minnan region, or southern Fujian
- Southern Min, a variety of Chinese
- Hokkien people in the narrow definition
- Hokkien and Teochew people in the loose definition

== People ==
- Denzil Minnan-Wong
- Hsieh Min-Nan
