= Michael Baker (physician) =

Canadian physician, academic, and cancer researcher

- Born: Michael Allen Baker; January 24, 1943 (age 83); Toronto, Ontario, Canada
- Awards: Order of Canada; Order of Ontario

Michael Allen Baker, CM OOnt (born January 24, 1943) is a Canadian physician, academic, and cancer researcher. He is Rose Family Chair in Medicine, former Physician-in-Chief, University Health Network and Professor of Medicine at the University of Toronto. His research has helped to improve the understanding of human leukemia and other cancers.

Born in Toronto, Ontario, Baker attended Oakwood Collegiate Institute, then received his M.D. from the University of Toronto in 1966. He received his diploma from the National Board of Medical Examiners in 1967 and is a Fellow of the Royal College of Physicians and Surgeons of Canada specializing in Hematology and Internal Medicine. In 1982, he joined the University of Toronto as a Professor of Medicine. In 1992, he was made Physician-in-Chief of the Toronto General Hospital.

He was president of the National Cancer Institute of Canada for 3 years and a board member of the Canadian Cancer Society for 5 years. In 2008, he was appointed by the Ontario Ministry of Health and Long-Term Care Executive Lead - Patient Safety, to oversee the government's patient safety agenda. In 2011, he was elected Chair of the Board of the Institute of Evaluative Sciences (ICES).

== Honours ==
In 2008, he was made a Member of the Order of Canada "for his contributions to health care in Canada, notably for his work in developing an innovative, integrated medical care program for cancer patients and for his leadership in the area of infectious disease control". In 2009, he was made a member of the Order of Ontario in recognition for being "a leading researcher whose work has led to a better understanding of leukemia and other cancers". In 2006, he was made a Fellow of the Canadian Academy of Health Sciences. He was awarded the 125th Anniversary of the Confederation of Canada Medal and the Queen Elizabeth II Golden Jubilee Medal.
