= Jon Burnside =

Canadian politician

Chair of the Toronto Transit Commission
- In office November 24, 2022 – August 11, 2023
- Preceded by: Jaye Robinson
- Succeeded by: Jamaal Myers

Toronto City Councillor for Ward 16 Don Valley East
- Incumbent
- Assumed office November 15, 2022
- Preceded by: Denzil Minnan-Wong

Toronto City Councillor for Ward 26 Don Valley West
- In office December 1, 2014 – December 1, 2018
- Preceded by: John Parker
- Succeeded by: Ward dissolved

Personal details
- Spouse(s): Carla Collins (divorced); Charlene Quesnelle Kew
- Occupation: Politician; public servant; police officer

Jon Burnside is a Canadian politician and former police officer who has represented Ward 16 Don Valley East on Toronto City Council since 2022. He was first elected to the ward in the 2022 Toronto municipal election and re-elected in 2026. Burnside served as chair of the Toronto Transit Commission (TTC) from 2022 to 2023. He previously represented Ward 26 Don Valley West from 2014 to 2018.

== Background ==
Burnside attended Leaside High School and the University of Western Ontario. He has two siblings, and his mother originated from England. He was previously married to Carla Collins and is currently married to Charlene Quesnelle Kew.

Prior to his election to council, Burnside worked as a Toronto Police Service officer from 1991 to 2001 and later launched his own meal delivery company.

== Political career ==
Burnside first ran for city council in Ward 26 in the 2010 Toronto municipal election, losing narrowly to incumbent councillor John Parker. He defeated Parker in the 2014 Toronto municipal election.

He ran unsuccessfully for re-election in the 2018 Toronto municipal election in the newly constituted Ward 15 Don Valley West against fellow incumbent councillor Jaye Robinson. The new ward had the same boundaries as the provincial and federal electoral districts of the same name. Robinson received 49.22% of the vote, compared with Burnside's 43.82%.

In the 2022 Toronto municipal election, Burnside ran for election in the neighbouring Ward 16 Don Valley East, following the retirement of incumbent councillor Denzil Minnan-Wong. He won with 44.68% of the vote, defeating ten other candidates.

Burnside was appointed chair of the TTC by Mayor John Tory on November 24, 2022. He served until August 2023, when he was succeeded by Jamaal Myers.

Burnside ran for re-election in Ward 16 in the 2026 Toronto municipal election. He was re-elected on October 26, receiving 19,654 votes (71.35%), defeating three challengers. His nearest opponent, Sinan Erdemir, received 3,370 votes (12.23%). Burnside's share of the vote increased by 26.67 percentage points compared with 2022.

== Electoral history ==
2026 Toronto municipal election, Ward 16 Don Valley East
Candidate	Votes	%	±%
Jon Burnside (X)	19,654	71.35	+26.67
Sinan Erdemir	3,370	12.23	–
Stacey Moffatt	2,337	8.48	–
Didi Moffat	2,185	7.93	–
Total valid votes	27,546	100.00	

2022 Toronto municipal election, Ward 16 Don Valley East
Candidate	Votes	%	±%
Jon Burnside	8,147	44.68	–
Stephen Ksiazek	3,778	20.72	–
Jonathan Mousley	1,282	7.03	–
Colin Mahovlich	1,059	5.81	–
Samina Alim	945	5.18	–
Stella Kargiannakis	700	3.84	–
Walter Alvarez-Bardales	616	3.38	–
Nick Pachis	579	3.18	–
Dimitre Popov	549	3.01	–
John Simms	410	2.25	–
George Asimakis	169	0.93	–
Total valid votes	18,234	100.00	

2018 Toronto municipal election, Ward 15 Don Valley West
Candidate	Votes	%	±%
Jaye Robinson	16,219	49.22	–
Jon Burnside	14,440	43.82	–
Tanweer Khan	1,309	3.97	–
Nikola Streker	583	1.77	–
Minh Le	404	1.23	–
Total valid votes	32,955	100.00	

2014 Toronto municipal election, Ward 26 Don Valley West
Candidate	Votes	%	±%
Jon Burnside	9,415	42.73	+13.53
John Parker (X)	6,167	27.99	−3.31
Ishrath Velshi	3,055	13.86	–
David Sparrow	1,786	8.11	–
Wasim Vania	1,033	4.69	–
Dimitre Popov	578	2.62	–
Total valid votes	22,034	100.00	

2010 Toronto municipal election, Ward 26 Don Valley West
Candidate	Votes	%	±%
John Parker (X)	6,203	31.3	–
Jon Burnside	5,788	29.2	–
Mohamed Dhanani	5,627	28.4	–
Yunus Pandor	1,452	7.3	–
Tanvir Ahmed	377	1.9	–
Shaukat Malik	216	1.1	–
Nawab Salim Khan	169	0.9	–
Total valid votes	19,832	100.0	
