= Andrew Simone =

Canadian dermatologist

Andrew Simone CM
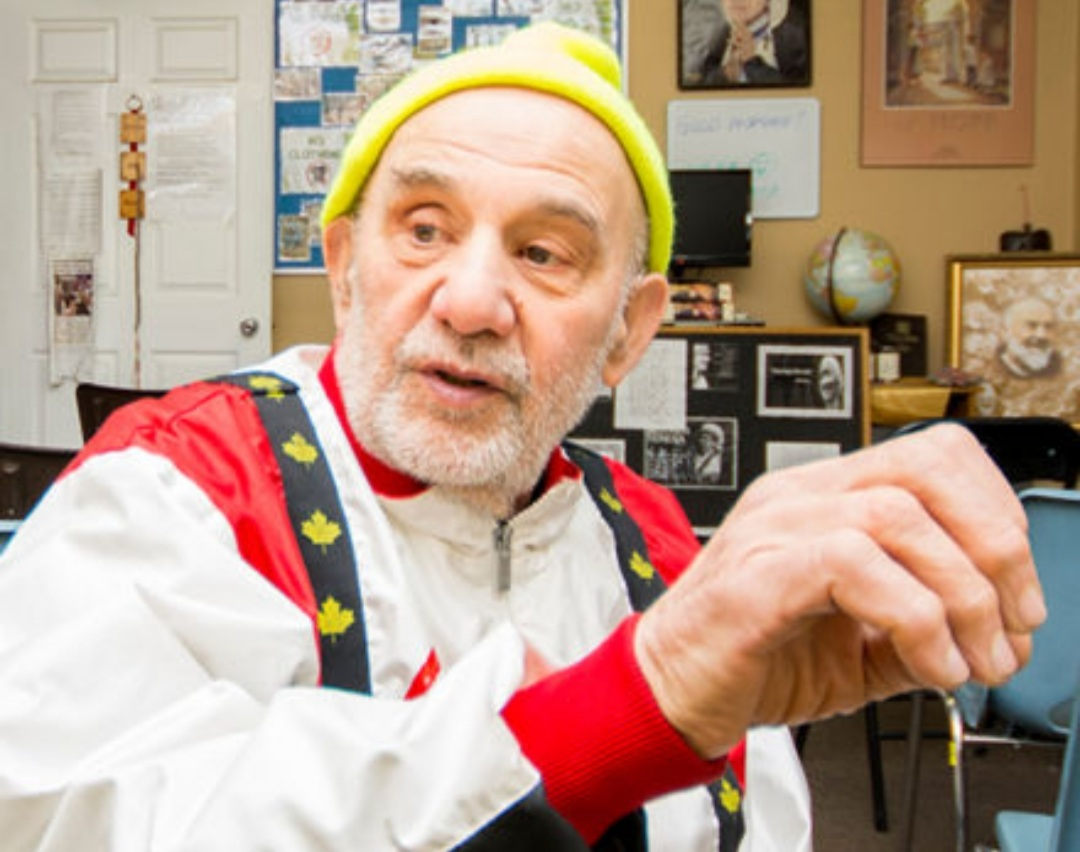
- Simone in 2018
- Born: Andrew Alexander Simone; May 12, 1938 (age 87); Toronto, Ontario, Canada
- Education: Queen's University (MD); Harvard Medical School (Residency)
- Occupation: Dermatologist
- Years active: 1968–present
- Known for: Canadian Food for Children (founder)
- Spouse: Joan Simone (m. 1960; died 2022)
- Children: 14
- Website: Official website

Andrew Alexander Simone, CM (born May 12, 1938) is a Canadian physician, dermatologist and founder of Canadian Food for Children, a charity which collects funds and food for starving children around the world. He operates an Etobicoke (Toronto) based practice as one of the few walk-in dermatology clinics in the region.

== Early life and education ==
Born and raised in Toronto, he is the son of a Sicilian immigrant father and a French-Canadian mother. He attended Oakwood Collegiate Institute. He graduated as Doctor of Medicine in 1963 from Queen's University and became a dermatologist in 1968 after specializing at Harvard Medical School.

== Personal life ==
He was married to Joan Simone née Hoare, an English-Canadian, with whom he had 13 children.

In 1985, after meeting Mother Teresa, he founded Canadian Food for Children.

A fitness enthusiast, Simone has completed four Ironman Triathlons and the Boston Marathon twice.

== Achievements and honours ==
- 1987: Papal cross, Pro Ecclesia et Pontifice, St. Michael's Cathedral Basilica (Toronto)
- 1997: Doctor of Sacred Letters, Honoris Causa, University of St. Michael's College
- 1998: Christian Stewardship Award, International Catholic Stewardship Council
- 2000: Order of Canada
- 2002: Order of Merit, Religious and Military Order of the Knightly Order of St. Catherine with Mount Sinai
- 2006: St. Anthony's International Award for Solidarity With the Poor
- 2019: Humanitarian Dermatology Certificate of Appreciation, International League of Dermatological Societies
- 2020: Teasdale-Corti Award, Royal College of Physicians and Surgeons of Canada
