= Oakwood Collegiate Institute =

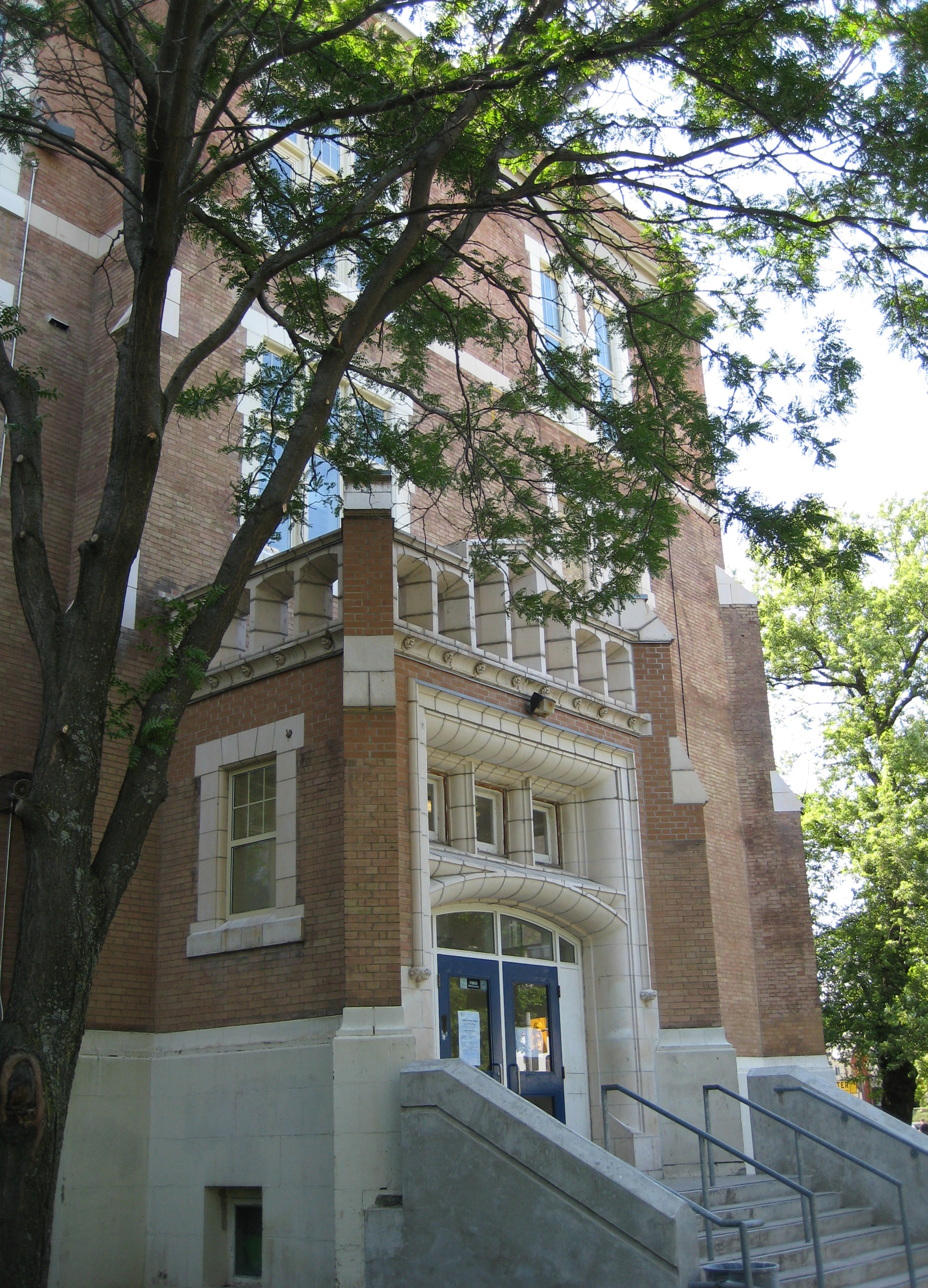

Location
- 991 St. Clair Ave. West; Toronto, Ontario, M6E 1A3; Canada; 43.678621°N 79.436420°W

Information
- School type: Public, high school
- Established: 1908
- School board: Toronto District School Board
- Principal: Andrea Parise
- Grades: 9-12
- Enrolment: 689 (budgeted enrolment 2013-14)
- Schedule type: Semestered
- Colours: Double Blue and Gold
- Mascot: Barons
- Website: schools.tdsb.on.ca/OakwoodCI

Oakwood Collegiate Institute (commonly known as OCI or Oakwood) is a public high school in Toronto, Ontario, Canada. It is located near the neighbourhoods of Regal Heights, Oakwood-Vaughan and Bracondale Hill.

== History and Alumni ==
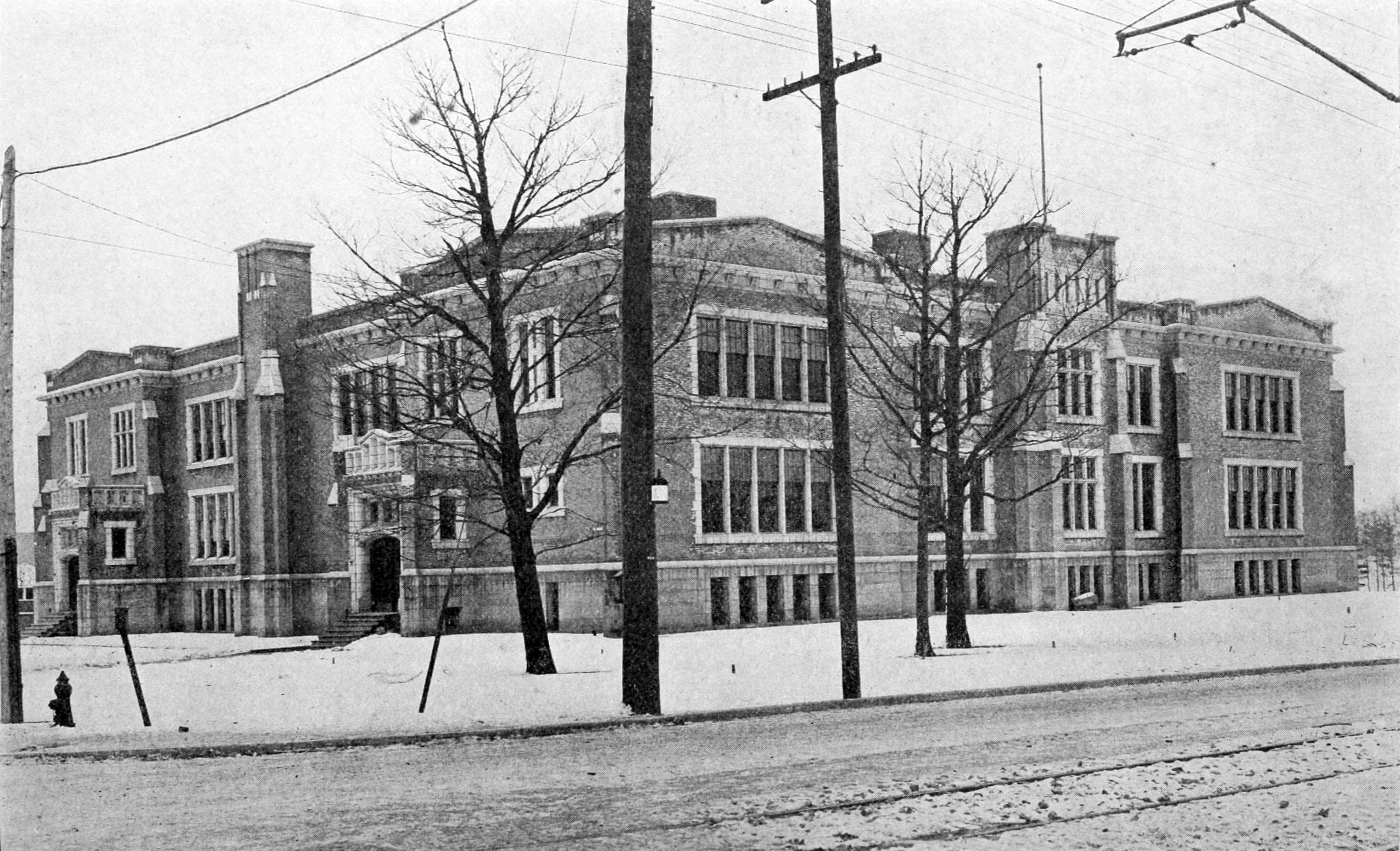
Oakwood Collegiate, 1914

Oakwood was founded in 1907. Originally situated above King Edward Public School (Jr. & Sr.), in 1911 architect Charles Hartnoll Bishop completed the permanent location opened at the corner of St. Clair Ave. West and Oakwood Avenue in Collegiate Gothic structure. The school's motto, tempus litteris demus, is translated from the Latin in this context to mean "take the time to learn."

== Layout ==
Oakwood's population studies in a three-storey building and has a gym, weight room and art department located in the basement. The "centre" of the building is the school's auditorium, and can be accessed from the first and second floors. Two wings jut out from the main building, one in a westerly direction (towards Dufferin St.), and one in a southerly direction (towards Davenport Rd.)

The basement houses the departments of Visual Arts and Technological Design, as well as the school's athletic facilities: two gyms, a smaller "games room" used for intramural sports, a pool with a viewing gallery, and a weight room.

During the last stretch of the Ontario New Democratic Party government of Bob Rae, Oakwood was next on the list of schools to be renovated, directly after Riverdale Collegiate Institute. After Rae had lost the 1995 provincial elections to the Progressive Conservative Party of Ontario under Mike Harris, the plans for renovation were scrapped. Among them were plans for a re-orientation of the auditorium (which would face east, not south), and an orchestra pit.

== Schedule ==
Contrary to an increasing number of schools in the Toronto District School Board (TDSB), the school remained non-semestered until 2019; in other words, a course ran for a full year. Oakwood followed a four-day "block" cycle, although due to its status as a non-semestered school, classes were shorter and occurred more frequently. Each period lasted approximately 75 minutes during a regularly scheduled day. Days that did not fit the regular pattern were modified period starting and ending times. Oakwood became semestered as of September 2020.

== Extracurricular activities ==
=== Athletics ===
Oakwood is home to the Barons and the Lady Barons sports teams. The school has traditionally performed in soccer, rugby, hockey, basketball, field hockey, and archery. The school is home to several intramural leagues (i.e. students against students), including basketball and floor hockey. Athletic teams are managed by the department of Physical Education, the Girls' Athletic Association (GAA) and the Boys' Athletic Association (BAA). The two gyms provide sufficient, yet limited use for games between Oakwood and other high schools. Intramural league games are held in a third gymnasium named the "Games Room"; a weight room is available to students during regular school hours.

The senior Barons boys basketball team won the (OFSAA) Ontario high school basketball championship for the 2013-2014, 2022–23, and 2023-24 seasons, and won bronze in 2024-25. The team won the (TDSSAA) Toronto high school senior boys basketball championship for the 2014-2015 season.

=== Student government ===
Government is provided by the student organization Caput (Latin for "Head"). There are six positions available: The President, the Vice-President, the Secretary, the Treasurer, and the Social Convenor are all elected by students in the spring. The five elected students are responsible for electing a sixth student to the position of Executive Member.

=== Concerts ===
Music students put on several performances a year: two main ones in November and April, jazz concerts throughout the year, and a Chamber Concert for senior students who perform concerti on their instrument. This is also an opportunity for senior students to organize and perform their own musical acts. Concerts traditionally end with a singing of the school song.

=== Musicals ===
Every year the Oakwood Drama Society puts on a major production, usually a musical.

=== Trips ===
Various departments co-ordinate trips to international locations in order to enhance students' knowledge of the subject they are studying. Previous locations have included Beijing, China; Ålborg, Denmark; Los Angeles, California; Yellowknife, Northwest Territories; Paris, France; Rome, Italy; Athens, Greece; Vienna, Austria; Prague, Czech Republic; New York City, New York; and Chicago, Illinois. Particularly within the Music Department, teachers keep the location of trips secret until they are mostly planned.

== Notable former students ==
- Rosalie Abella - Appointed to the Supreme Court of Canada.
- Gil Adamson - Author of The Outlander, which won the Books in Canada First Novel Award in 2008.
- Jeremy Adelman - Professor of History at Princeton University.
- John Arnup - Judge on the Court of Appeal for Ontario who pioneered universal legal aid in Ontario.
- Harry Arthurs - Former Dean of Osgoode Hall Law School and President of York University.
- Michael Baker - Physician, academic, and cancer researcher.
- Micah Barnes - Singer-songwriter with the bands Loudboy and The Nylons.
- Alan Bernstein - Cancer researcher.
- Jully Black - Juno Award-winning R&B singer-songwriter.
- Gil Boa - Sport shooter who competed in the 1952 Summer Olympics, 1956 Summer Olympics, 1960 Summer Olympics, 1964 Summer Olympics, and 1972 Summer Olympics.
- Mark Breslin - Entrepreneur, stand-up comedian and actor; co-founded Yuk Yuk's, the largest chain of comedy clubs in Canada.
- Harry Bruce - writer and journalist.
- Jane Bunnett - Juno Award-winning saxophonist, flautist, and bandleader known for her Afro-Cuban jazz melodies.
- Torquil Campbell - Singer and songwriter for the Montreal-based indie rock band “Stars”.
- Brendan Canning - Founding member of the band "Broken Social Scene".
- Elinor Caplan - Businesswoman and politician.
- Ann Y. K. Choi - author and educator.
- Jerry Ciccoritti - Gemini Award-winning film director.
- Alfred Henry Clarke - Member of Parliament.
- Kamari Maxine Clarke - Professor.
- Norman Clarke - Olympian.
- Gerald Clawson - Swimmer at 1936 Summer Olympics.
- Carl Cole - Co-founder of Coles Bookstore, once the largest bookstore chain in Canada.
- Evan Cranley - Musician with the bands Stars and Broken Social Scene.
- Dianne Cunningham - Progressive Conservative member of the Legislative Assembly of Ontario from 1988 to 2003, and cabinet minister in the governments of Mike Harris and Ernie Eves.
- Wes Cutler - Football player in the Canadian Football League for six seasons for the Toronto Argonauts.
- Arthur P. Dempster, Professor Emeritus in the Harvard University Department of Statistics.
- DijahSB, musician.
- Charles Dinsmore - Football player for the Toronto Argonauts and NHL hockey player on the Montreal Maroons in the 1920s.
- Laverna Katie Dollimore - Awarded the Order of Canada for her participation in the Canadian Caper, in which Canadians orchestrated the release of Americans in Iran in 1979.
- Bill Domm - Member of Parliament from 1979 to 1993; known for his crusades against the metric system and his support of capital punishment.
- Hannah and Vivien Endicott-Douglas - Actresses and sisters.
- Bernard Etkin - University dean; expert in aircraft guidance and control
- Bob Ezrin - Music producer and keyboardist, best known for his work with Lou Reed, Alice Cooper, Kiss, Pink Floyd, Peter Gabriel, and Phish.
- Charlotte Fielden - Novelist, playwright, actress and poet.
- Greg Francis - Olympic basketball player and coach.
- John Fraser - Journalist, writer and academic. He served as Master of Massey College in the University of Toronto.
- David French - Poet and playwright.
- John Judah Glass - Represented St. Andrew in the Legislative Assembly of Ontario from 1934 to 1943 as a Liberal member.
- Dan Goldstick, Philosopher, writer and political activist; Professor Emeritus at the University of Toronto.
- K.M. Graham - artist.
- Kadre Gray, professional basketball player.
- Francess Halpenny - Dean of the Faculty of Library Science at the University of Toronto from 1972 to 1978, now known as University of Toronto Faculty of Information. From 1969 to 1988, she was one of the editors of the Dictionary of Canadian Biography.
- James Milton Ham - Engineer, university administrator and 10th President of the University of Toronto.
- Lucas Hammond, Olympian.
- Sharon Trostin Hampson - Member of the children's musical trio Sharon, Lois & Bram.
- Bill Hanley - Member of Hockey Hall of Fame as a builder.
- G. Arnold Hart, president, chairman, and chief executive officer of Bank of Montreal. Member of Order of Canada.
- Alan Milliken Heisey Sr. - Activist, author, publisher and politician.
- Lionel Hitchman - Played twelve seasons in the National Hockey League for the Ottawa Senators and Boston Bruins, where he was team captain.
- Mark Jones - Sportscaster.
- Paul Jones - Toronto Raptors' radio play-by-play announcer on Fan 590.
- Isaiah L. Kenen - Journalist, lawyer and philanthropist
- Murray Koffler - Pharmacist, businessman, and philanthropist; best known for creating the Canadian pharmacy retailer Shoppers Drug Mart.
- James Laxer - Political economist, professor and author.
- Stephen Lewis - Politician, broadcaster and diplomat. Leader of the Ontario New Democratic Party for most of the 1970s.
- Aaron Long - Animator, director of Bojack Horseman
- John B. Macdonald - President of the University of British Columbia from 1962 to 1967.
- Jama Mahlalela - Assistant coach for the Toronto Raptors of the National Basketball Association.
- Larry D. Mann - actor.
- Harry Mannis - Broadcaster.
- James Harley Marsh - Editor, writer and encyclopedist of The Canadian Encyclopedia.
- Goldwyn Arthur Martin - Judge of the Court of Appeal for Ontario and one of the most prominent experts in criminal law in Canada.
- Malcolm Wallace McCutcheon - Lawyer, actuary and politician.
- George McGill - Royal Canadian Air Force officer who participated in The Great Escape.
- John McKennell - Hockey coach.
- Mary di Michele - Poet and author.
- Frank Miller - 19th Premier of Ontario.
- Boonaa Mohammed - Spoken-word poet and writer of Oromo descent.
- MorMor, musician.
- Emilie Mover - Juno Award-winning singer-songwriter.
- Winifred Needler - Egyptologist.
- Jean Newman - Toronto politician who served as Controller budget chief and was the first woman to run for Mayor of Toronto.
- E. Herbert Norman - Diplomat and historian.
- Seth Nyquist - musician.
- Kardinal Offishall, Rapper.
- Paolo Pietropaolo - Journalist, broadcaster, composer and writer. His CBC series The Wire won a Peabody Award.
- Peter Li Preti - Toronto city councillor.
- Joshua Primo, professional basketball player.
- James Randi - Stage magician and scientific skeptic best known for his challenges to paranormal claims and pseudoscience.
- Paul Hartley Raney - Second Lieutenant fighter pilot with the Royal Flying Corps, 66th Squadron. Shot down and killed in World War I.
- Harry Rasky, Documentary film producer.
- Escott Reid - Diplomat.
- Ivan Reitman - Film producer and director.
- John Roberts - Oxford PhD elected (and defeated) three times to Canada's House of Commons.
- Charles Gordon Roland - Author, editor, and professor of the history of medicine.
- Tony Rosato - Actor and cast member on Saturday Night Live during the 1981–82 season.
- Larry Rosen - Chairman and CEO of Harry Rosen Inc.
- Devyani Saltzman - Author, curator and journalist; daughter of film directors Paul Saltzman and Deepa Mehta.
- Robert Hood Saunders - Mayor of Toronto, President of Canadian National Exhibition, chairman Ontario Hydro.
- Robin Sears - Former broadcaster at CITY-TV. Now a communications, marketing and public affairs adviser.
- Louis Shannon - Toronto politician who served for many years on Toronto City Council and the Toronto Board of Control.
- James Shaw - Founder and lead guitarist of indie rock band Metric, and founder of the band Broken Social Scene.
- Andrew Simone - Physician, dermatologist and co-founder of Canadian Food for Children.
- Doris Slater - cartoonist, painter, and art teacher.
- Art Smith - Played on Oakwood's 1923-24 OHA-Junior hockey team. Went on to play for the Toronto Canoe Club, Toronto Falcons, Toronto Maple Leafs, Ottawa Senators, Boston Cubs, and Chicago Shamrocks.
- Jason Sniderman - Musician and businessman.
- Warren Snyder - Olympian and doctor.
- Reginald Stackhouse - Member of the Canadian House of Commons.
- Sinclair Stevens, Lawyer, businessman and cabinet minister.
- Betty Tancock - Swimmer who competed in the 1932 Summer Olympics in Los Angeles.
- Andy Thompson - Leader of the Ontario Liberal Party and later served as a Senator. He was elected as the Member of Provincial Parliament for the west-end Toronto Dovercourt electoral district in 1959.
- Eddie Thompson - Award-winning, all-star and Grey Cup champion halfback in the Ontario Rugby Football Union. Thompson was a war hero who lost his life in World War II.
- Michael Tulloch - The first Black judge appointed to the Ontario Court of Appeal.
- Adam Vaughan - Radio and TV journalist; Member of the Canadian House of Commons.
- Patrick Watson - Broadcaster, television and radio interviewer and host, author, commentator, television writer, producer, and director.
- Al Waxman - Actor and director of over 1000 productions on radio, television, film, and stage; best known for his starring roles in the television series King of Kensington and Cagney & Lacey.
- Ernest Weinrib - Law professor.
- Witch Prophet - Musician.
- York Wilson - Painter and muralist.

== See also ==
- Education in Ontario
- List of secondary schools in Ontario
