= Ward 16 Don Valley East =

Municipal council district in Toronto, Ontario, Canada

Coordinates: 43.75°N 79.34°W

- Constituency for the Toronto City Council
- Location of Ward 16 in Toronto
- City: Toronto
- Population: 94,335 (2021)

Current constituency
- Created: 2018
- Councillor: Jon Burnside
- First contested: 2018 election
- Last contested: 2026 election
- Ward profile: Ward profile

Ward 16 Don Valley East is a municipal electoral district in Toronto, Ontario, Canada for Toronto's City Council. It was last contested in the 2026 municipal election, with Jon Burnside elected councillor.

== Boundaries ==
On August 14, 2018, the Government of Ontario redrew municipal boundaries via the Better Local Government Act, 2018, S.O. 2018, c. 11 - Bill 5. This means that the 25 provincial electoral districts and the 25 municipal wards in Toronto currently share the same geographic borders.

Defined in legislation as:

Consisting of that part of the City of Toronto described as follows: commencing at the intersection of Highway No. 401 with Victoria Park Avenue; thence southerly along said avenue to Sunrise Avenue; thence westerly along said avenue and its production to the Don River East Branch; thence generally southwesterly along said branch to Don Mills Road; thence northerly along said road to Overlea Boulevard; thence southwesterly along said boulevard to the Don River West Branch; thence generally northwesterly along said branch to Eglinton Avenue East; thence easterly along said avenue to Leslie Street; thence generally northerly along said street to Highway No. 401; thence easterly along said highway to the point of commencement.

== History ==
=== 2018 boundary adjustment ===
Toronto municipal ward boundaries were significantly modified in 2018 during the election campaign. Ultimately the new ward structure was used and later upheld by the Supreme Court of Canada in 2021.

== Councillors ==
Council term	Member	
Council term	Don Parkway (Metro Council)	
1988–1991	Marie Labette	
1991–1994	Marie Labette	
1994–1997	Gordon Chong	
	Ward 11 Don Parkway	
1997–2000	Gordon Chong, Denzil Minnan-Wong	
	Ward 33 Don Valley East	Ward 34 Don Valley East
2000–2003	Paul Sutherland	Denzil Minnan-Wong
2003–2006	Shelley Carroll (until April 2018)	Denzil Minnan-Wong
2006–2010	Shelley Carroll (until April 2018)	Denzil Minnan-Wong
2010–2014	Shelley Carroll (until April 2018)	Denzil Minnan-Wong
2014–2018	Shelley Carroll (until April 2018)	Denzil Minnan-Wong
2014–2018	Jonathan Tsao (from May 2018)	Denzil Minnan-Wong
	Ward 15 Don Valley East	
2018–2022	Denzil Minnan-Wong	
2022–2026	Denzil Minnan-Wong	
2022–2026	Jon Burnside	
2026–2030	Jon Burnside	

== Election results ==
2026 Toronto municipal election

Candidate	Votes	%	minus
Jon Burnside (X)	19,654	71.35	26.67 ▲
Sinan Erdemir	3,370	12.23	–
Stacey Moffatt	2,337	8.48	–
Didi Moffat	2,185	7.93	–

2022 Toronto municipal election

Candidate	Vote	%
Jon Burnside	8,147	44.68
Stephen Ksiazek	3,778	20.72
Jonathan Mousley	1,282	7.03
Colin Mahovlich	1,059	5.81
Samina Alim	945	5.18
Stella Kargiannakis	700	3.84
Walter Alvarez-Bardales	616	3.38
Nick Pachis	579	3.18
Dimitre Popov	549	3.01
John Simms	410	2.25
George Asimakis	169	0.93

2018 Toronto municipal election

Candidate	Votes	Percentage
Denzil Minnan-Wong	11,128	43.33%
David Caplan	7,277	30.3%
Stephen Ksiazek	1,698	7.07%
Dimitre Popov	1,104	4.6%
Pushpalatha Mathanalingam	888	3.7%
Michael Woulfe	771	3.21%
Aria Alavi	582	2.42%
Diane Gadoutsis	569	2.37%

== See also ==
- Municipal elections in Canada
- Municipal government of Toronto
- List of Toronto municipal elections
