= Bartholomew Bull =

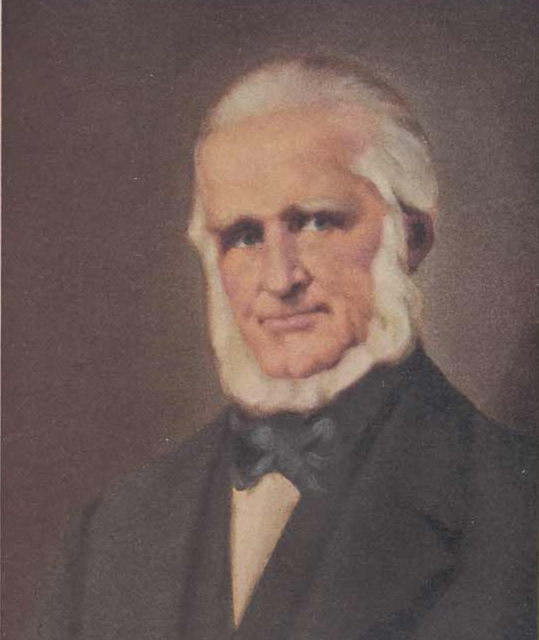
- Portrait of Bartholomew Bull, the Patriarch of Spadunk
- Born: 1791; Tipperary, Ireland
- Died: 1879 (aged 87–88); Ontario
- Occupation: farmer
- Known for: influential pioneer in Upper Canada.

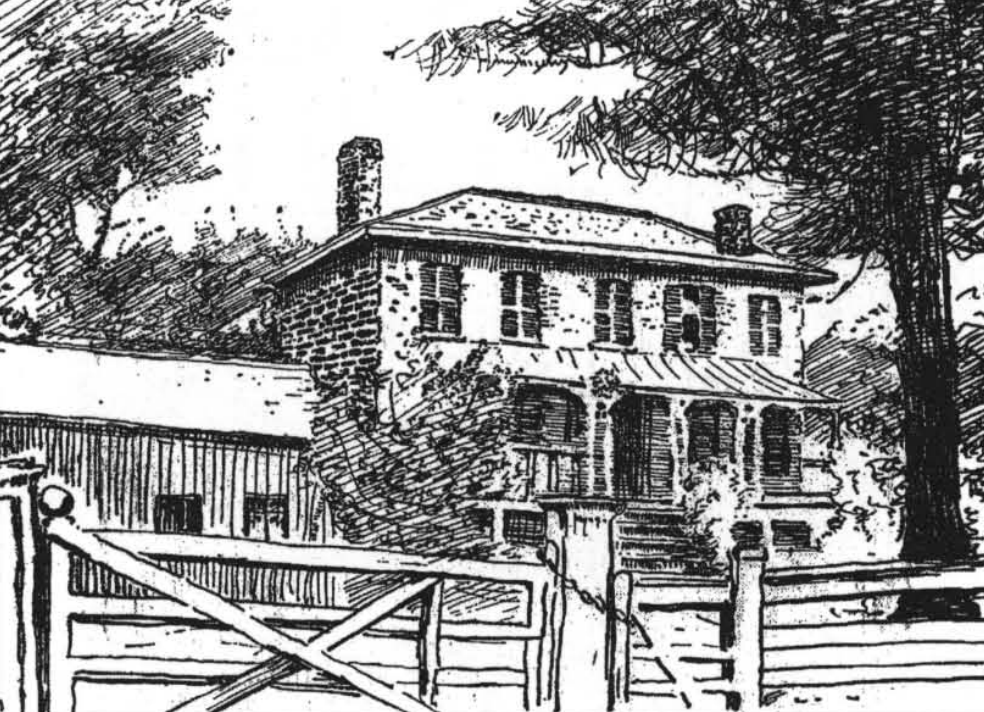
in 1830 Bull replaced his original log cabin with the first brick house in York Township, north of Davenport Road.

Bartholomew Bull (1791–1879) was an immigrant to Upper Canada and land owner there.

Bull arrived at York, with his wife and his first-born child in 1818. In 1824 he acquired his own parcel of land, 200 acres on the brow of the Lake Iroquois Escarpment, between what is now Dufferin Street and Ossington Avenue, north of Davenport Road, and south of St. Clair Avenue.

When he was clearing his land Bull received a contract to supply cordwood to the garrison at Fort York.

Bull's father had been a friend of the founder of Methodism, John Wesley, and Bull's home hosted Sunday prayer meetings, before a local church was built, and he is credited for helping establish the church in Upper Canada.

Nicholos Flood Davin, in "The Irishman in Canada", lists Bull as an early success story, rising from "bush farmer", to prominent land owner, whose sons became doctors and lawyers.
