= Cliff Jenkins =

Canadian politician

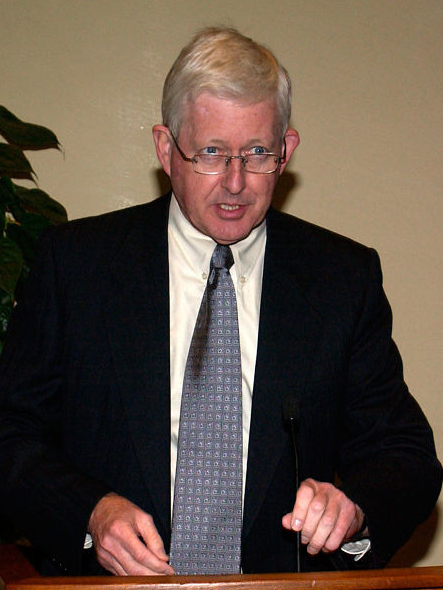
- Jenkins in 2006

Toronto City Councillor for (Ward 25) Don Valley West
- In office 2003–2010
- Preceded by: Joanne Flint
- Succeeded by: Jaye Robinson

Personal details
- Born: 1946 (age 79–80) Hamilton, Ontario
- Children: 3
- Occupation: Corporate executive

Cliff Jenkins (born c. 1946) is a former city councillor in Toronto, Ontario, Canada. He represented Ward 25 which was one of the two Don Valley West wards, from 2003 to 2010.

Jenkins was born in Hamilton to a working-class family. He attended McMaster University on a scholarship, and graduated with an undergraduate mathematics degree. He then went to the University of Toronto where he obtained a master's degree in mathematics and a bachelor's degree in education. He briefly worked as a high school math teacher before joining IBM Canada. He eventually rose to be a Client Executive at IBM.

He served as president of the York Mills Ratepayers Association. He was elected to Toronto City Council in the 2003 municipal election after incumbent Joanne Flint was appointed to the Ontario Municipal Board. He lost the 2010 election after being narrowly defeated by Jaye Robinson.

In each election campaign, Jenkins declined all contributions from corporations and unions – and he pledged to work for a municipal by-law to prohibit such contributions entirely to end undue influence of special interests. In 2009, Toronto Council adopted Councillor Michael Walker’s motion seconded by Councillor Jenkins to ban such contributions.

Subsequently in private life, Jenkins formed his own company offering electronic voting services. He also engaged in volunteer advocacy. After the 2017 Sears bankruptcy, he became a founding member of the BigBlue Pensioners Association, representing members of the IBM Canada pension plan - advocating legislation to better protect pensions in the event of an involuntary pension plan windup. In 2023, the Parliament of Canada adopted a private member’s bill authored by MP Marilyn Gladu to become Pension Protection Act. An avid amateur curler, Jenkins undertook to answer a longstanding curling question "what makes a curling stone curl?" by co-authoring, with his son Scott and family friend Laslo Diosady (Ph.D.), a scientific research paper “Asperity-based pivot-slide model of curling stone motion” published in the Canadian Journal of Physics.
