= Alan Milliken Heisey Sr. =

Canadian politician (1928–2014)

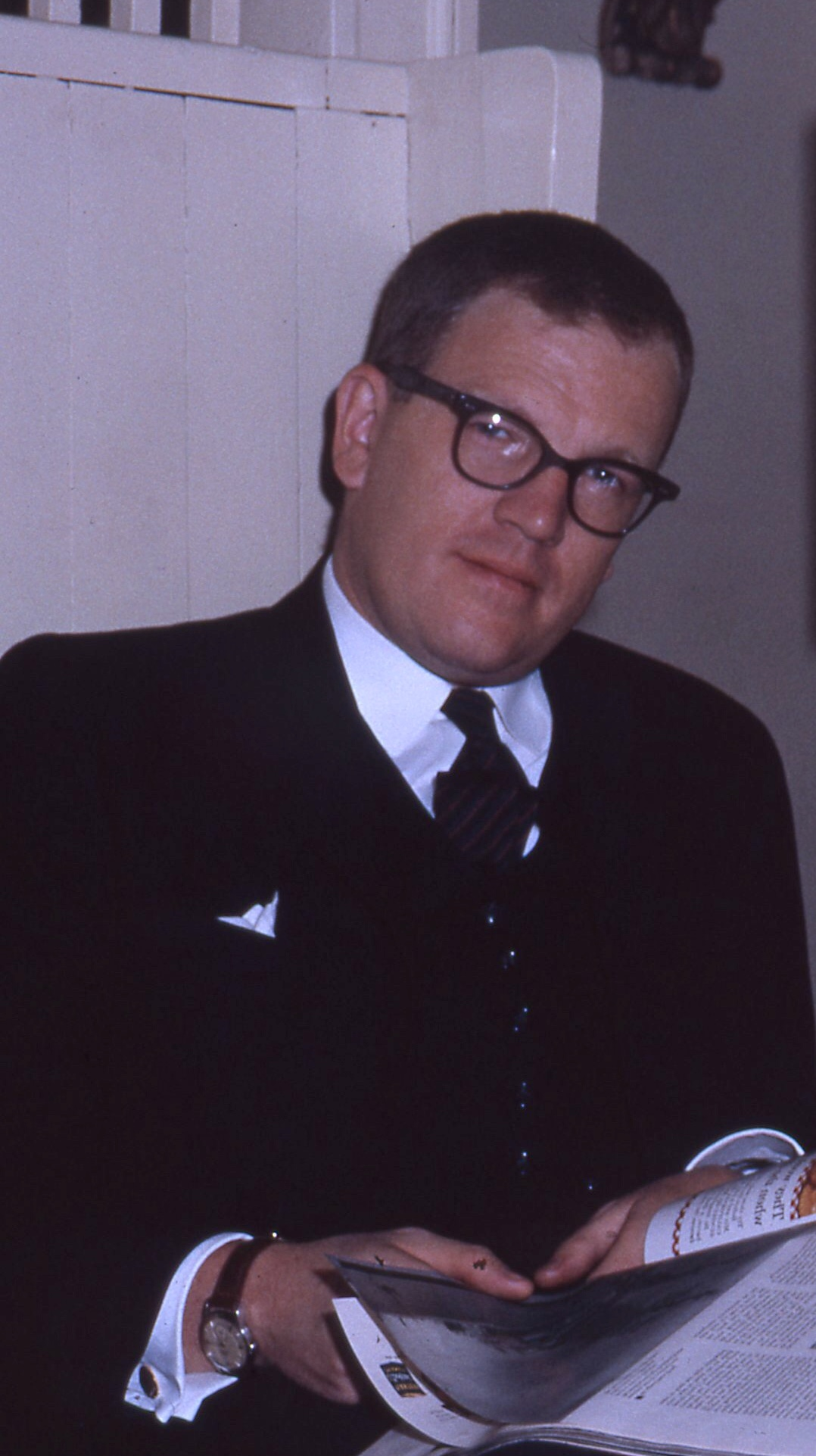
- Alan Heisey Sr. 1962

Alderman Ward 8 City of North York
- In office January 1, 1976 – December 31, 1980
- Preceded by: Robert O'Dell Roche
- Succeeded by: Andy Borins

Personal details
- Born: May 20, 1928 Toronto, Ontario, Canada
- Died: November 2, 2014 (aged 86) Toronto, Ontario, Canada
- Party: Conservative
- Other political affiliations: Progressive Conservative (until 2003)
- Occupation: Canadian publisher, author, activist and politician
- Known for: Canadian anti-nationalist

Alan Milliken Heisey Sr. UE (May 20, 1928 – 2 November 2014) was a Canadian publisher, author, activist, political columnist and politician from Toronto who wrote the book The Great Canadian Stampede - The Rush to Economic Nationalism - Right or Wrong in 1973 which presaged free trade between Canada and the United States and opposed Canadian economic nationalism.

== Background ==
He was born in Toronto and attended Oakwood Collegiate Institute and St. Andrew's College, Aurora, Class of 1946. He graduated from University of Toronto in Engineering in 1951. and from Harvard University with an MBA in 1953. He was married to Barbara Muriel Cornes (b. 1930) in 1953. His father was Karl Brooks Heisey a mining engineer and his mother was Alice Isabel Smith. He had 3 sons Alan Heisey II, Peter and Robin. Heisey earned a commission in the Toronto Scottish Regiment.

== Student activism ==
While attending the University of Toronto Faculty of Applied Science and Engineering he was a member of the Student Executive of the University of Toronto Engineering Students' Society. At the height of the Cold War in 1951 he led a group of 60 anti-communist engineering students in assuming control of a Communist affiliated group called the Peace Council of the University of Toronto for the purpose of destroying the organisation.

== Anti-nationalism ==
He was an early advocate of free trade between Canada and the United States in the 1960s and 1970s and was an opponent of Canadian nationalism and Canadian cultural protectionism. He was described as Canada's leading anti-nationalist in 1976. Free trade between Canada and the United States occurred with the passage of the Canada-United States Free Trade Agreement in 1988, eventually superseded by the North American Free Trade Agreement (NAFTA) in 1994.

== Political activities ==
He ran for the Parliament of Canada in the 1968 federal election as the Progressive Conservative candidate for York—Scarborough and lost to Liberal Robert Stanbury. Heisey ran for the Progressive Conservative nomination in the 1974 federal election for the York-Scarborough riding and lost to Ron Collister, a CBC reporter (Collister eventually lost to Stanbury the incumbent MP).

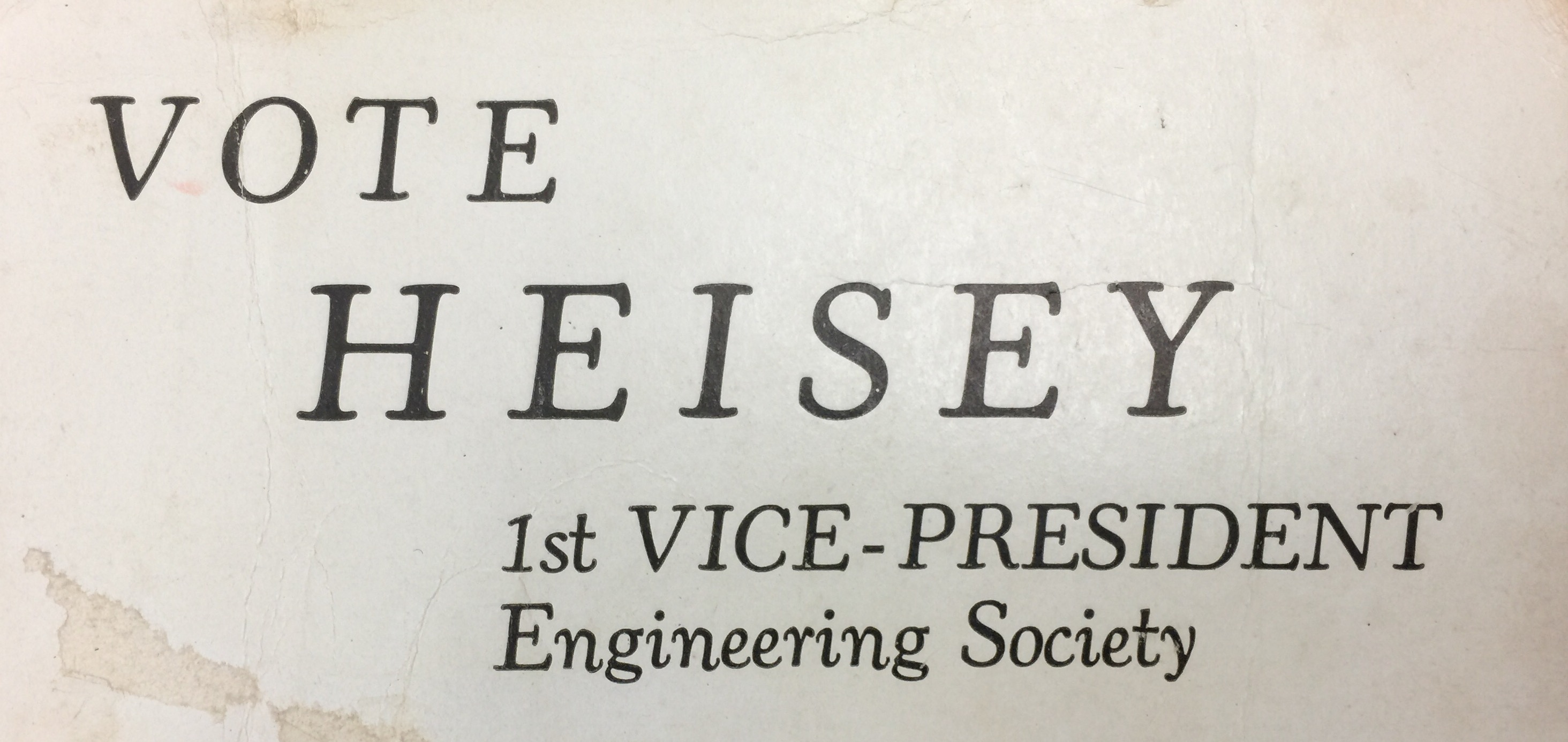
Student election flyer

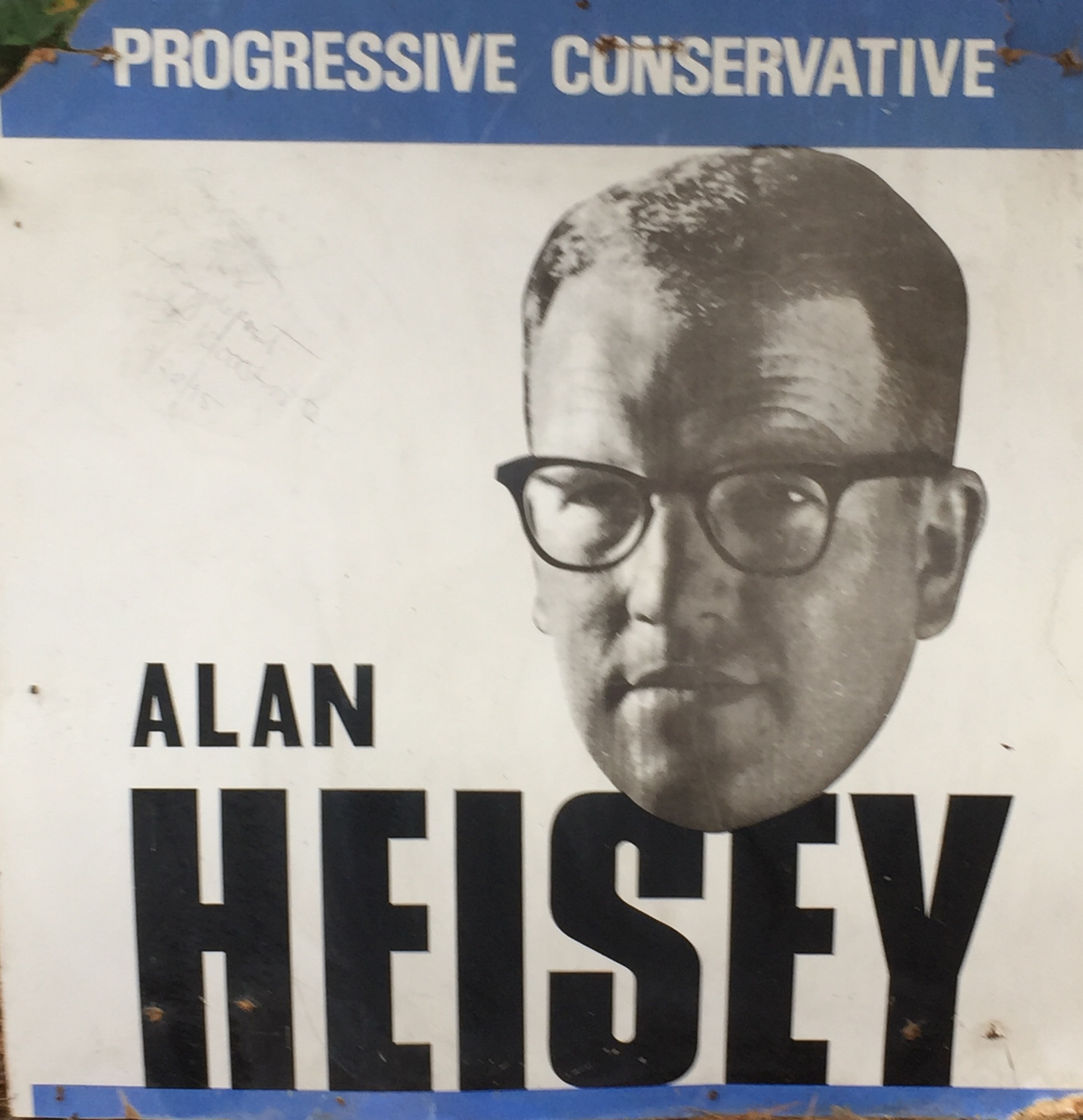
1968 election campaign sign

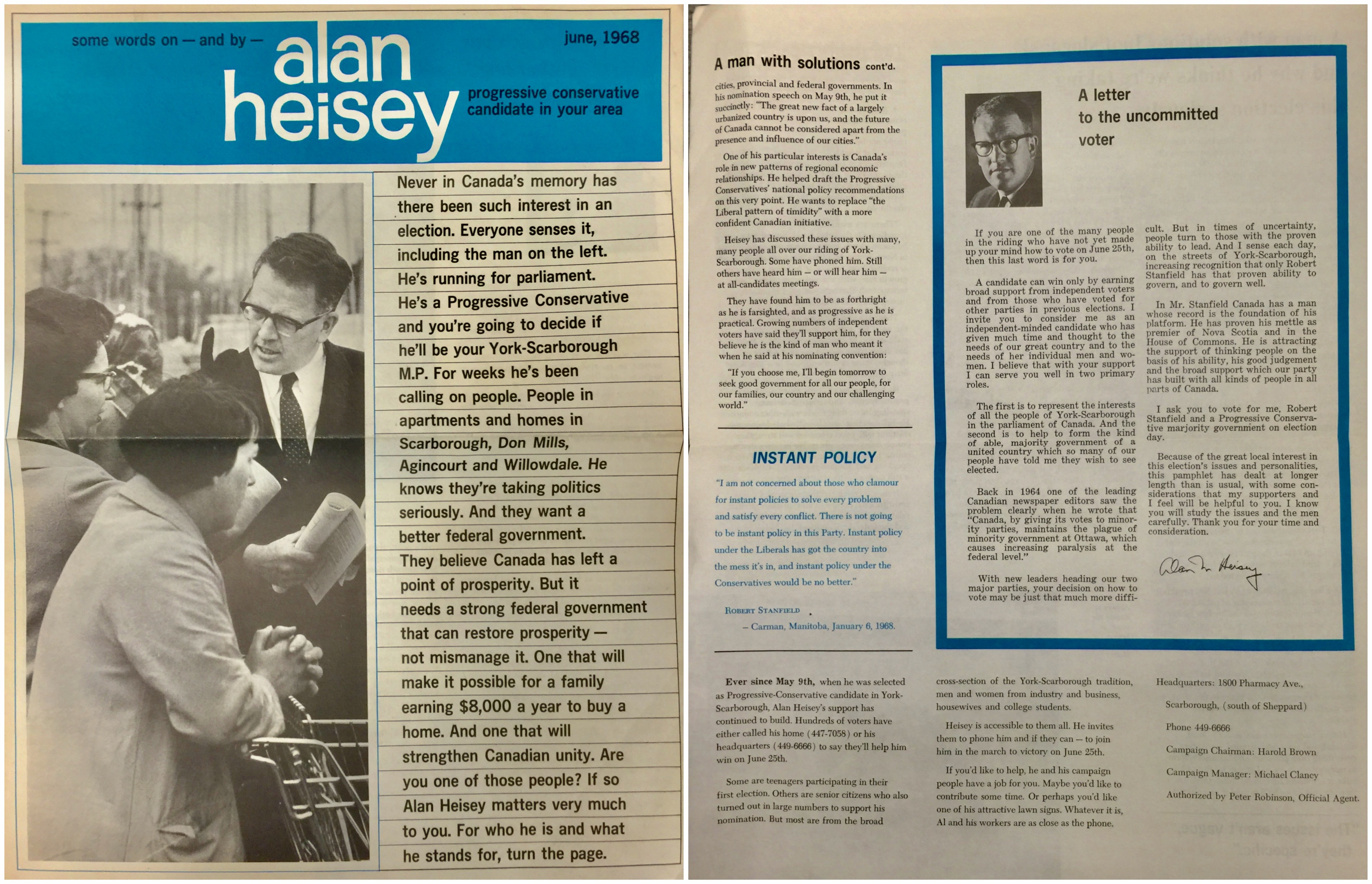
1968 election brochure

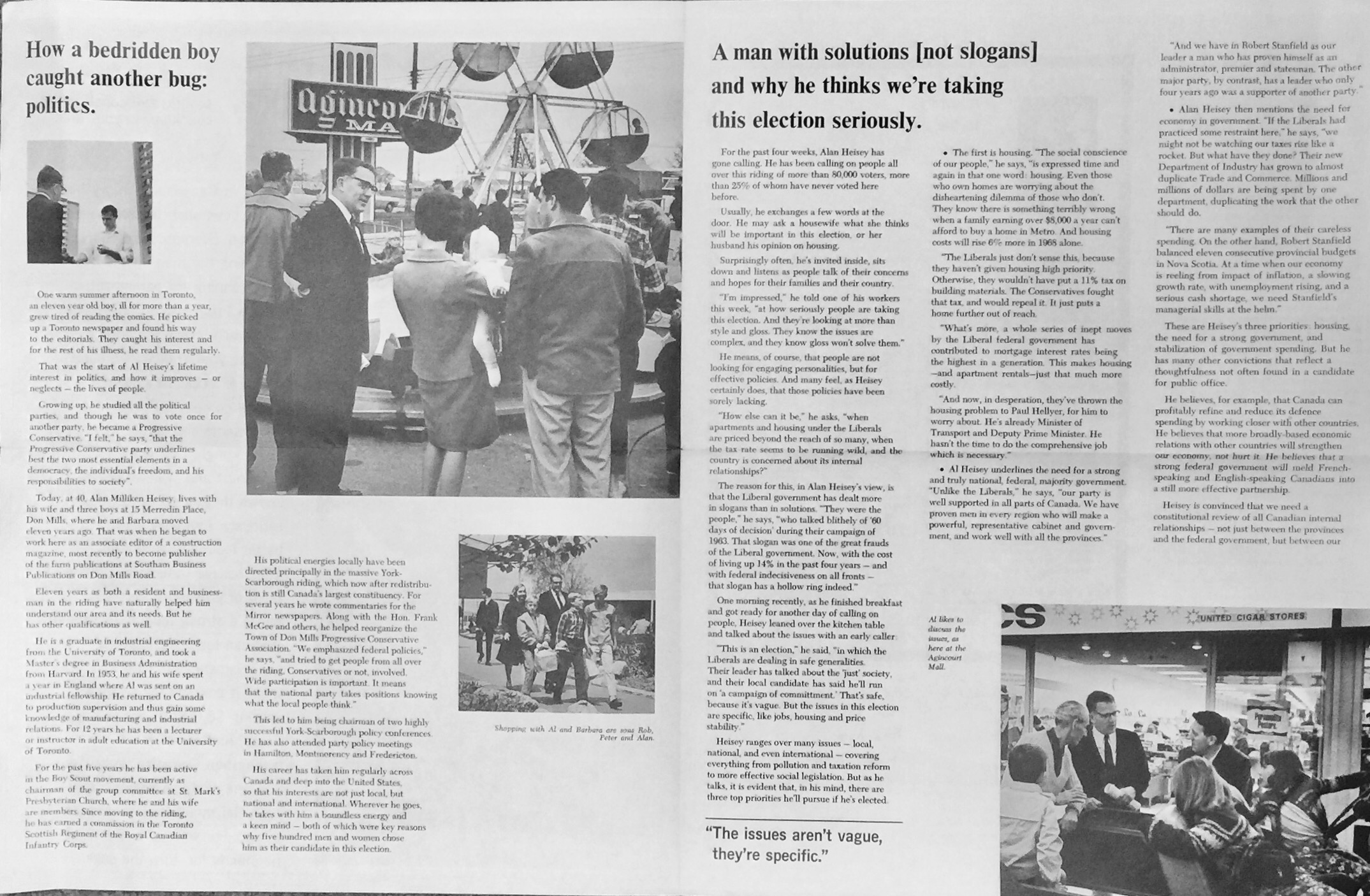
1968 election brochure

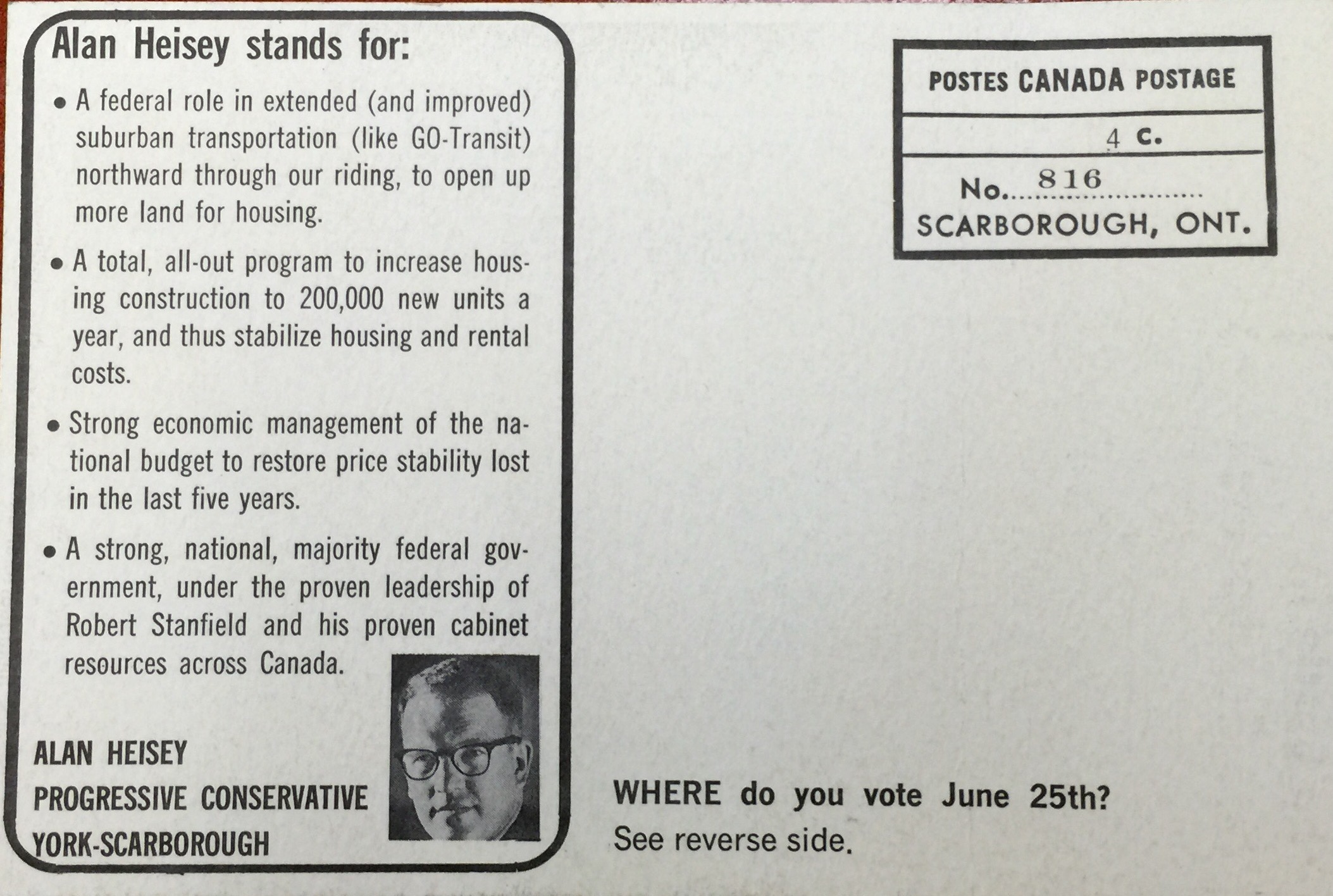
1968 election polling card

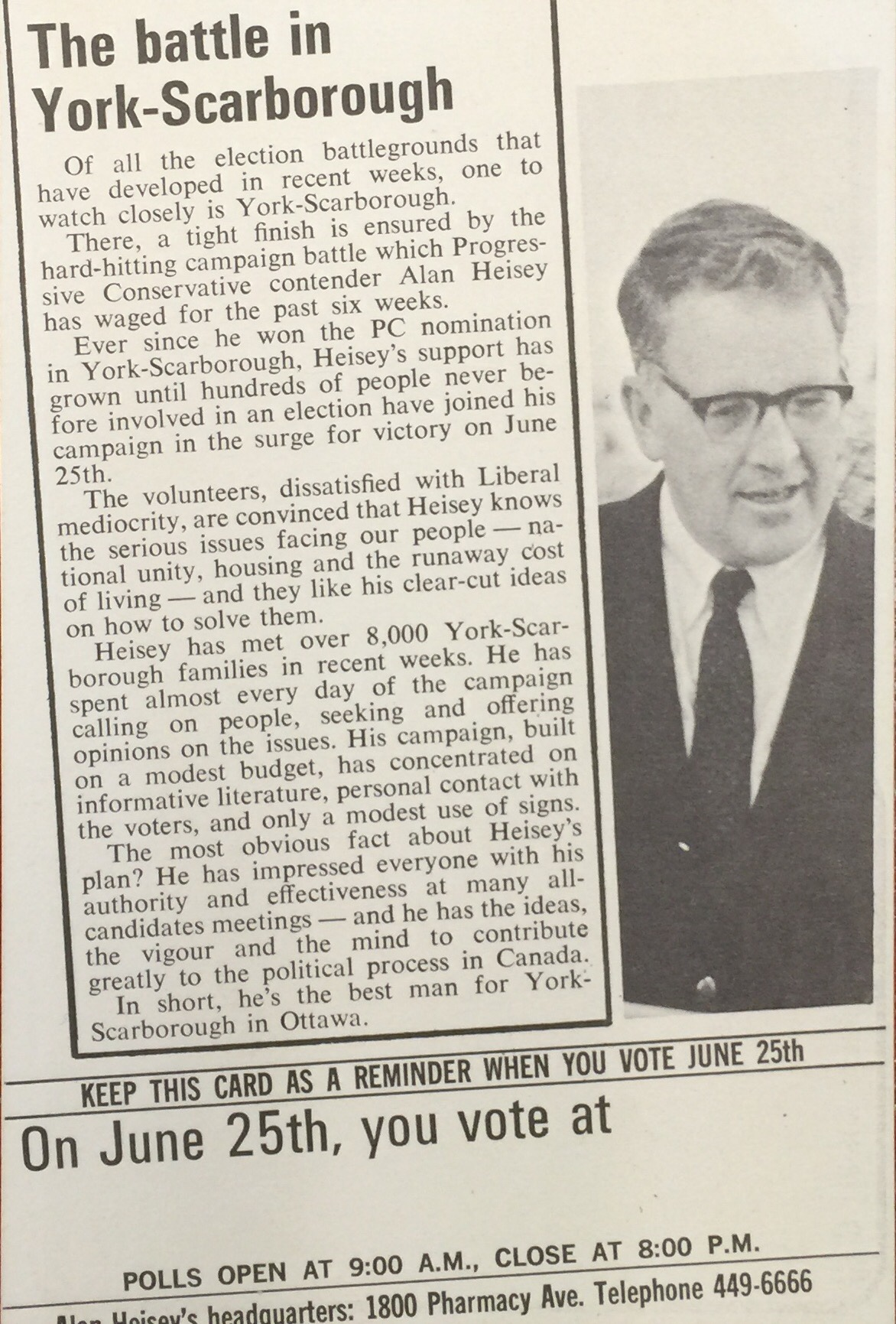
1968 election polling card (front)

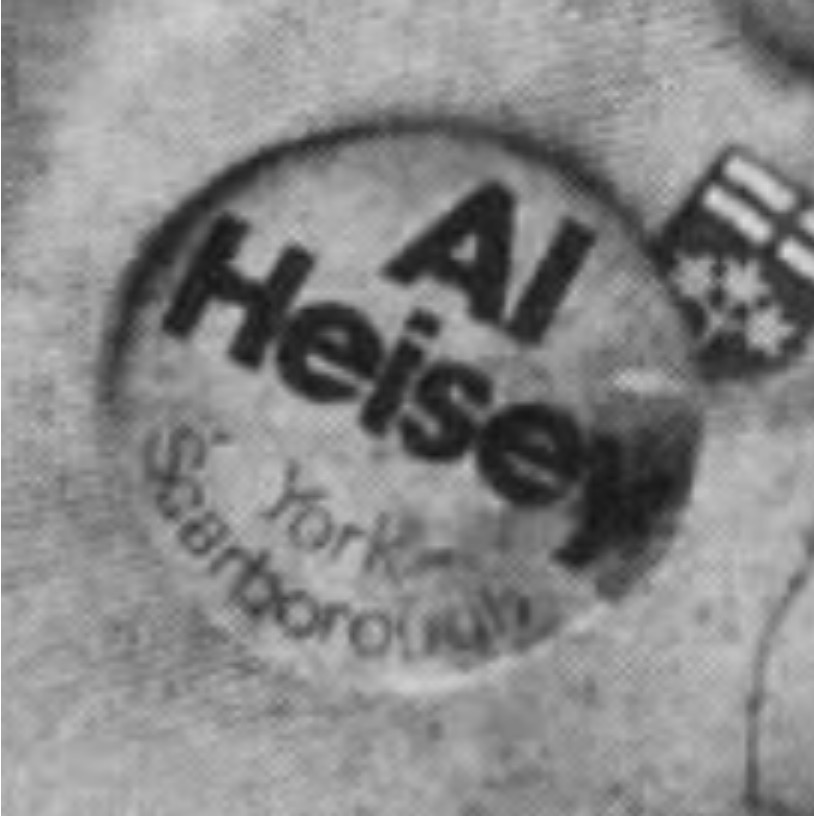
1968 Campaign Button

He was an active member in the Progressive Conservative Party and that party's successor, the Conservative Party of Canada. During the 1980s Heisey was Chairman of PC Metro, an umbrella organization of 31 Federal Progressive Conservative Party riding associations in and around what was then Metropolitan Toronto He was outspoken in his criticism of Prime Minister Stephen Harper's treatment of Nigel S. Wright in the Canadian Senate expenses scandal at the 2013 Conservative Party National Convention in Calgary.

He was first elected alderman for Ward 8 in the former Borough of North York, now Ward 15 Don Valley West, in the 1976 election defeating Beverley Salmon. Heisey ran again as alderman for Ward 8 in the 1978 election and was acclaimed. He was chairman of the Works Committee and an active member of North York Council As alderman he championed the equitable distribution of group homes throughout the city, naming rather than numbering city electoral districts, market value assessment for property taxes and criticised the conduct and decorum of fellow council members.

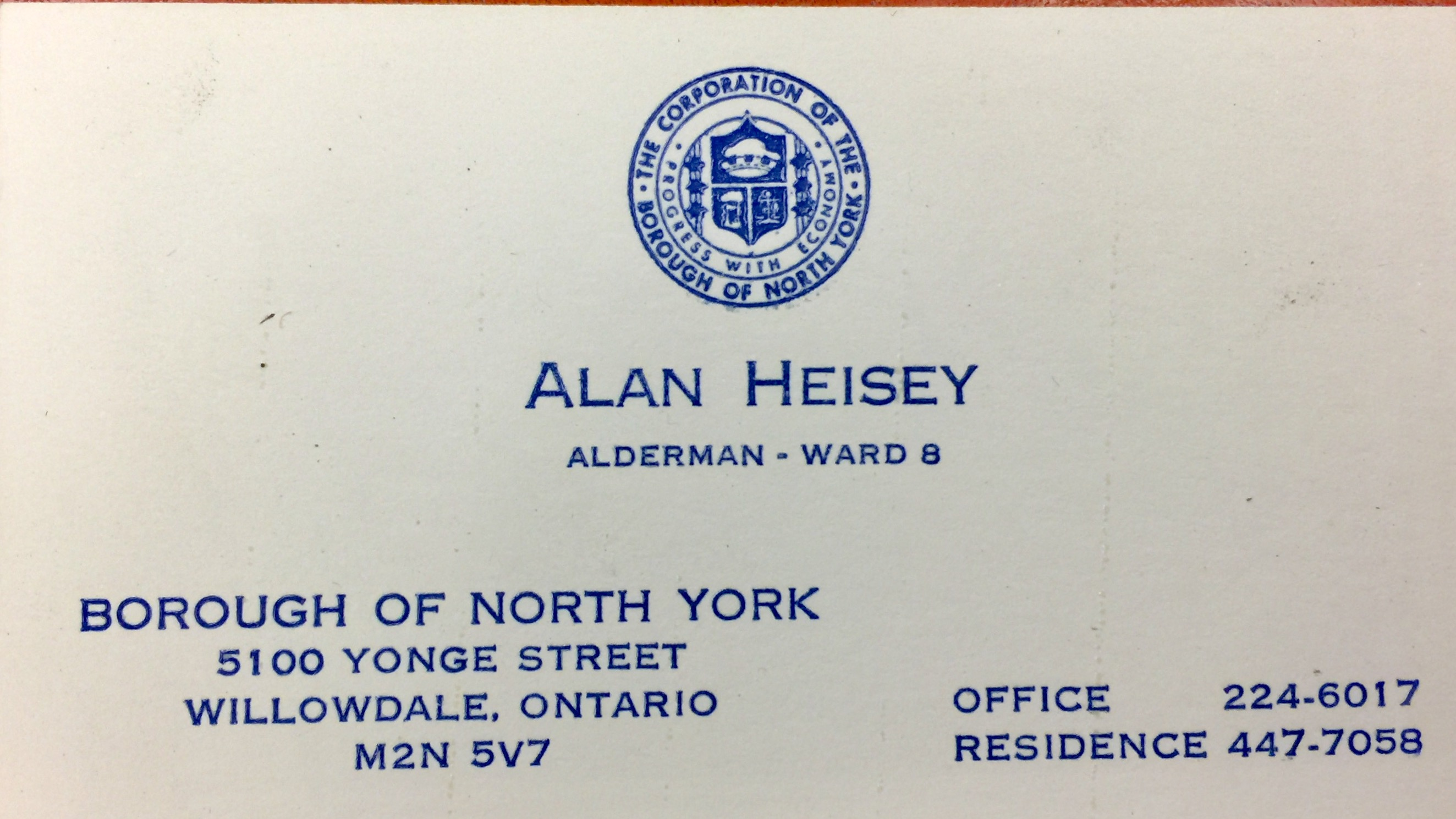
1976 business card

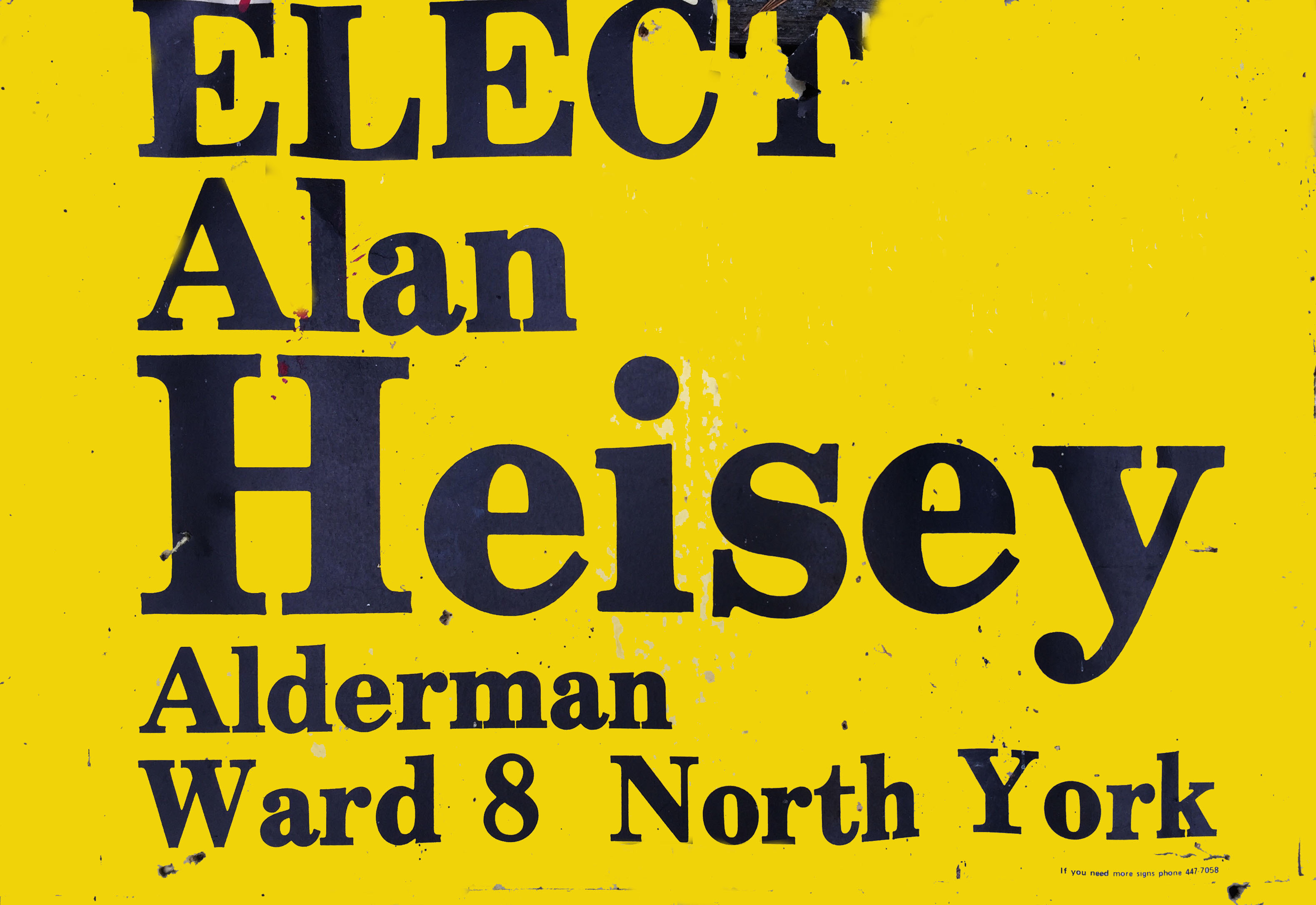
1976 election sign

1976 election brochure

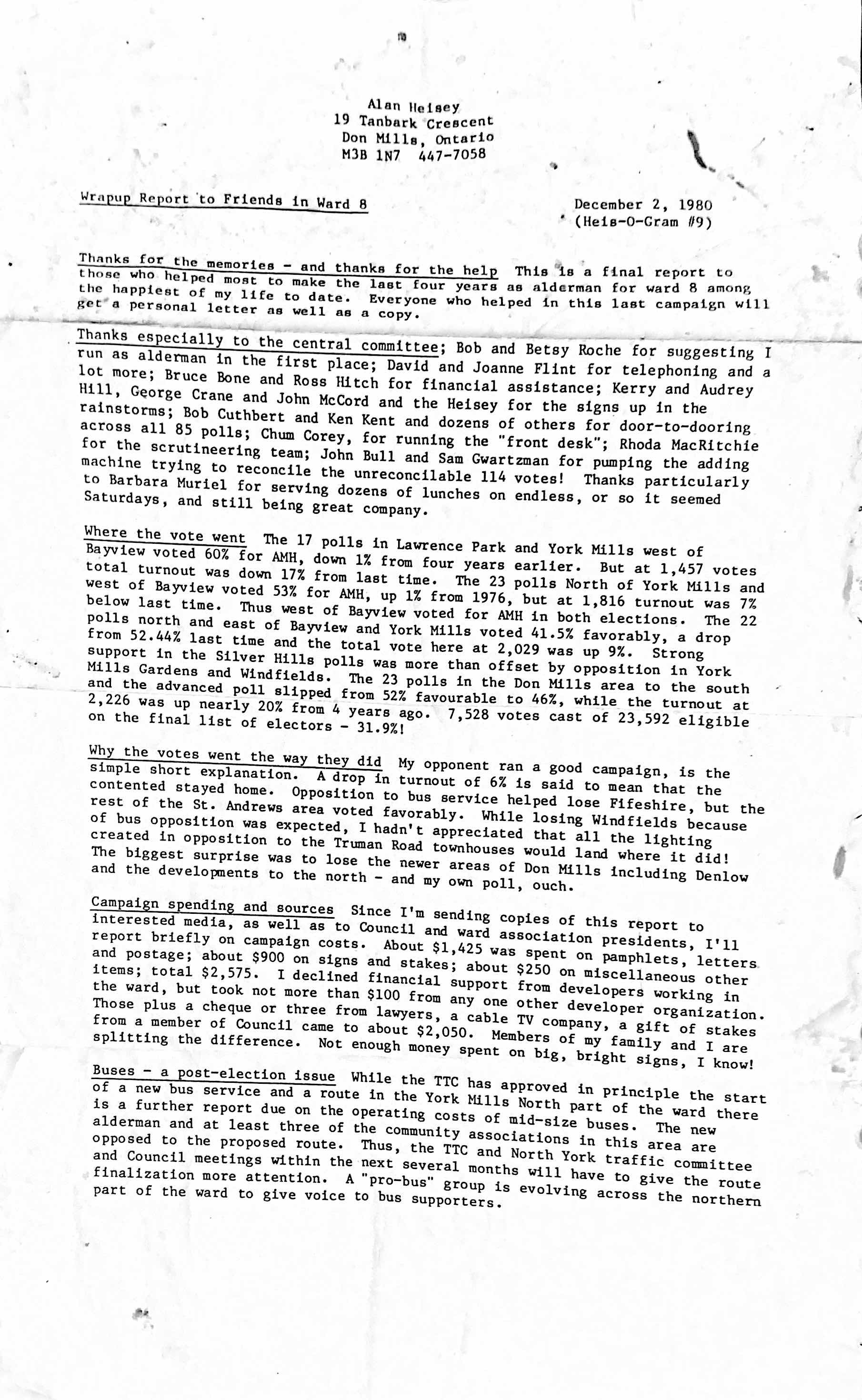
Heis-O-Gram #9 p. 1

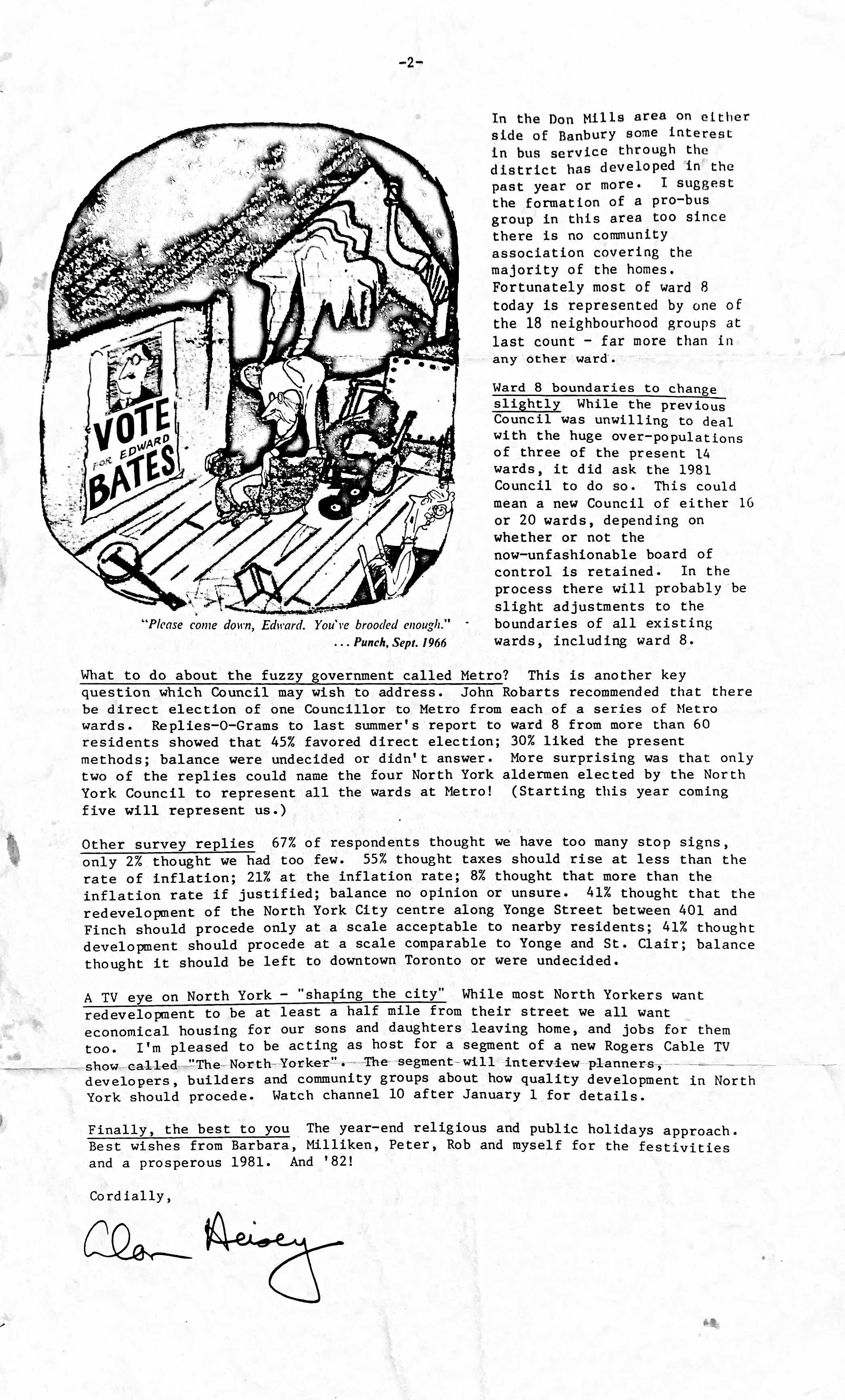
Heis-O-Gram #9 p. 2

1997 Toronto Mayoral Campaign Button

In November 1979 Heisey supported the introduction of a new Toronto Transit Commission Bus Route 115, servicing the Silver Hills area in North York, that travelled through a wealthy neighbourhood in face of strong opposition. He ran for reelection in the 1980 election and lost to Andy Borins who campaigned against the new bus service.

Heisey served on the Board of Governors of Seneca College from 1978 to 1980.

== Civic activism ==
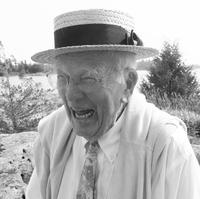
Alan Heisey 2014

He was an activist in local politics in the City of Toronto and the Township of Georgian Bay.

He ran as a fringe candidate for mayor of Toronto at the age of 68 in the 1997 municipal election.

For the last 20 years of his life he advocated for representation by population and electoral equality for urban voters in Canada concerned about city dwellers electoral under-representation at the provincial and federal levels of government and wrote extensively on the topic.

== Heisey Islands, Georgian Bay ==
As a result of Heisey's contributions as a writer and as a long time resident in the Township of Georgian Bay the Ontario Minister of Natural Resources officially named a group of islands in the Township of Georgian Bay located to the northwest of Beausoleil Island near Honey Harbour, on the Georgian Bay after him on July 17, 2017, pursuant to Section 4 of the Ontario Geographic Names Board Act, R.S.O. 1990, c. O.16.

Heisey Islands - OGNB decision
