= Denzil Minnan-Wong =

Canadian city councillor

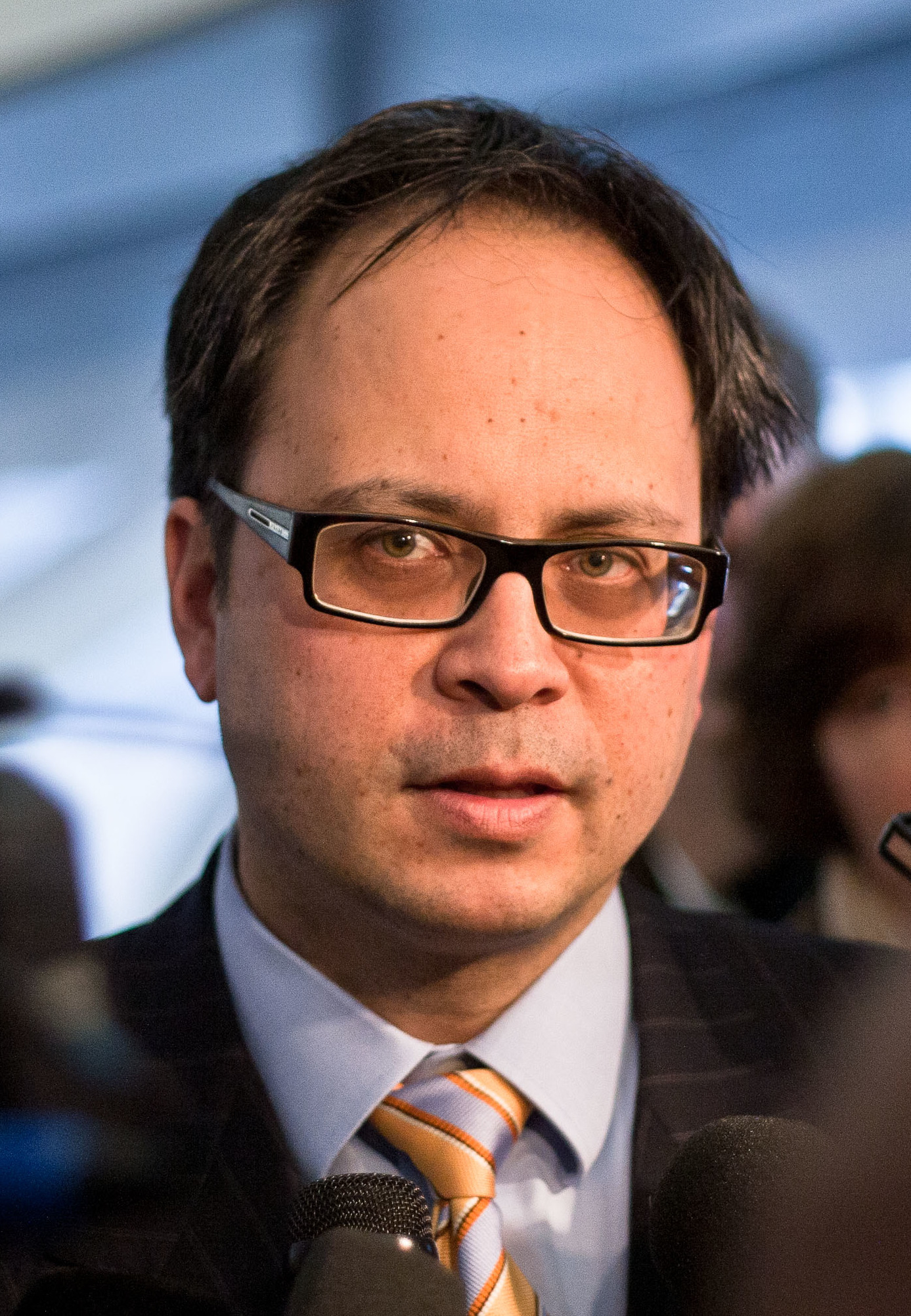
- Minnan-Wong in 2012

Deputy Mayor of Toronto for North York (Note: Minnan-Wong was also designated as the statutory deputy mayor.)
- In office December 1, 2014 – November 15, 2022
- Preceded by: Norm Kelly
- Succeeded by: Jennifer McKelvie (statutory); Michael Colle (North York; 2023)

Toronto City Councillor for Ward 16 Don Valley East
- In office December 1, 2018 – November 15, 2022
- Preceded by: Ward created
- Succeeded by: Jon Burnside

Toronto City Councillor for Ward 34 Don Valley East
- In office December 1, 2000 – December 1, 2018
- Preceded by: Ward created
- Succeeded by: Ward dissolved

Toronto City Councillor for Ward 11 Don Parkway
- In office January 1, 1998 – December 1, 2000
- Preceded by: Ward created
- Succeeded by: Ward dissolved

North York City Councillor for Ward 12
- In office January 1, 1995 – December 1, 1997
- Preceded by: Incumbent
- Succeeded by: Ward dissolved

Personal details
- Born: 1963 or 1964 (age 62–63)
- Spouse: Colleen
- Children: 3
- Occupation: Lawyer

Denzil Minnan-Wong
- Chinese: 黃旻南
Transcriptions
Standard Mandarin
- Hanyu Pinyin: Huáng Mínnán

Denzil Minnan-Wong (born c. 1963) is a former Canadian politician who was the statutory deputy mayor of Toronto from 2014 to 2022, representing North York. Minnan-Wong served on Toronto City Council from 1995 to 2022, representing a succession of wards in the Don Mills.

== Background ==
Born in 1963, Minnan-Wong is the son of Denzil Minnan-Wong, Sr. (a Chinese Canadian who became a prominent member of the Progressive Conservative Party of Ontario) and Josephine Cazabon (born in Timmins, Ontario). His father died in 1988 at age 53.

He was educated at Osgoode Hall Law School and became a lawyer specializing in immigration issues.

== Political career ==
In 1994 North York councillor Barry Burton died of cancer and the North York city council appointed Minnan-Wong as interim councillor for Ward 12. He was subsequently elected to the position in the November 1994 municipal election. In 1997 he was elected as one of two councillors representing Ward 11 – Don Parkway to the city council of the new amalgamated city of Toronto. In July 2022 Minnan Wong announced he would not seek re-election in the October 2022 municipal election after 28 years in elected office.

=== Garbage collection privatization ===
In 2011, he led an initiative to contract out garbage collection in Toronto west of Yonge Street in 2011 which projected savings of $12 million a year. As of 2021, reports published by the City of Toronto state the privatized garbage collection west of Yonge was actually costing more than the city’s in-house garbage operations, at $143.48 per household per year as opposed to the city’s garbage collection services at $139.24 per household per year. Despite this, Minnan-Wong has continued to voice his support for privatization of garbage collection services and strenuously opposes returning these services to the city’s operation.

=== Bike lanes ===
Although Minnan-Wong did not learn to ride a bicycle until the age of 46 in 2013, he supported the development of the first on street separated bike lane network in Toronto, resulting in the creation of the Sherbourne, Wellesley, Hoskin, Richmond and Adelaide protected cycle tracks while voting for the removal of three painted bike lanes on Jarvis Street, Pharmacy Avenue and Birchmount Road. The same year, he facilitated the move of the Bixi public bike share system to the operation of the Toronto Parking Authority. Minnan-Wong was instrumental in reaffirming the $150 fine for parking in rush hour zones, a policy described by Mayor Rob Ford as "a cash grab." Toronto was awarded Bicycle Friendly Community (BFC) gold status from the Share the Road Cycling Coalition in April 2015, an award criticized by local cycling advocates.

=== TTC board ===
He was appointed to the Toronto Transit Commission by City Council under the Mayor Rob Ford administration in December 2010. He was one of 5 councillors on the TTC board who voted in 2012 to terminate the services of the TTC General Manager Gary Webster. Andy Byford was hired as Webster's replacement. The five councillors who supported Webster's termination, including Minnan-Wong, were removed from the TTC board by council on March 5, 2012, as a result of a motion by Councillor Karen Stintz, chair of the TTC board. On December 2, 2014, he was appointed again to the TTC board by city council after the election of Mayor John Tory with his tenure ending with the end of his term of office as a councillor on November 15, 2022.

=== Ontario provincial 2018 election ===
On January 20, 2018 he was acclaimed as the candidate for the Progressive Conservative Party of Ontario for the riding of Don Valley East for the 2018 provincial election. He placed a close second to the Liberal incumbent, former cabinet minister Michael Coteau.

During his run for the Don Valley East seat, Minnan-Wong stated that he would take an "unpaid" leave from Toronto City Council, remitting the salary he would have collected from the 30-day provincial campaign period to either the city or a charity. He ultimately donated his councillor salary for that period to the City of Toronto and directed the money be spent on roads.

=== "Stick to knitting" controversy ===
In an interview published on August 30, 2017, in the Toronto Sun, Minnan-Wong said in reference to outgoing chief planner of Toronto Jennifer Keesmaat that he wanted the planner to "stick to the knitting". Although Minnan-Wong had previously also used the term to describe men he was accused of making a sexist comment by Keesmaat. Minnan-Wong apologized for his words and said that they were taken out of context.

=== 2018 municipal election ===
After the 2018 Ontario general election Minnan-Wong ran for Toronto City Council in the 2018 municipal election in newly constituted Ward 16 Don Valley East, winning re-election. Minnan-Wong was the only one of seven councillors on the TTC board to be re-elected. He was re-appointed during the 2018 to 2022 council term as deputy mayor and was reappointed, a third time, as a member of the TTC board.

=== Retires at 2022 municipal election ===
In July 2022, Minnan-Wong emailed a statement to his constituents advising he would not seek re-election in the 2022 Ontario municipal elections. In the message, Minnan-Wong said he felt it was time to move on to "the next stage of my life".

== Election results ==
=== Municipal ===
2018 Toronto election, Ward 16
Candidate	Votes	%
Denzil Minnan-Wong	11,128	46.33%
David Caplan	7,227	30.3%
Stephen Ksiazek	1,698	7.07%
Dimitre Popov	1,104	4.06%
Pushpalatha Mathanalingam	888	3.7%
Michael Woulfe	771	3.21%
Aria Alavi	582	2.42%
Diane Gadoutsis	569	2.37%
Total	23,967	100%

2014 Toronto election, Ward 34
Candidate	Votes	%
Denzil Minnan-Wong	9,761	53.46%
Mary Hynes	5,953	32.13%
Douglas Owen	1,171	6.32%
Faisal Boodhwani	705	3.80%
Amer Karaman	486	2.62%
Alan Selby	453	2.44%
Total	18,529	100%

2010 Toronto election, Ward 34
Candidate	Votes	%
Denzil Minnan-Wong	8,743	53.42%
Peter Youngren	6,484	39.63%
Stephan Stewart	1,140	6.96%
Total	16,367	100%

=== Provincial ===
2018 Ontario general election: Don Valley East
Party	Candidate	Votes	%	±%
Liberal	Michael Coteau	13,012	35.93	–22.80
Progressive Conservative	Denzil Minnan-Wong	11,984	33.09	+8.75
New Democratic	Khalid Ahmed	9,937	27.44	+15.48
Green	Mark Wong	917	2.53	–0.83
Libertarian	Justin Robinson	236	0.65	–
Freedom	Wayne Simmons	131	0.36	–0.47
Total valid votes		36,217	99.08	
Total rejected, unmarked and declined ballots		337	0.92	–0.27
Turnout		36,554	55.22	+7.38
Eligible voters		66,192		
Liberal hold		Swing		–15.78
Source: Elections Ontario

=== Federal ===
1997 Canadian federal election: Don Valley East
Party	Candidate	Votes	%	±%
Liberal	David Collenette	21,511	55.1	+1.0
Progressive Conservative	Denzil Minnan-Wong	8,610	22.1	-1.3
Reform	John Pope	5,167	13.2	-4.1
New Democratic	Shodja Ziaian	2,981	7.6	+3.8
Canadian Action	Joe Braini	384	1.0	
Natural Law	Mark Roy	192	0.5	0.0
Independent	Mariam Abou-Dib	170	0.4	
Total valid votes		39,015	100.0	
