= Caryma Sa'd =

Canadian lawyer and social media personality

- Born: 1989 or 1990 (age 36–37); Mississauga, Ontario, Canada
- Education: University of Ottawa
- Occupation: Lawyer
- Known for: Landlord and tenant legal work, cannabis law, documenting protests

Caryma Fayez Sa'd (born 1989/1990) is a Canadian lawyer and social media personality known for documenting political demonstrations and protests. She became prominent for her coverage of anti-COVID-19-lockdown protests and later the Canada convoy protest. In the 2026 Toronto municipal election, she ran to be the Toronto City Councillor for Ward 14 Toronto—Danforth and finished sixth among 18 candidates.

== Early life and education ==
Sa'd was born to an Indian mother and a Palestinian father, and grew up in Mississauga, Ontario. She studied law at the University of Ottawa.

== Legal career ==
After articling in a Bay Street law firm, and working for Lenczner Slaght Royce Smith Griffin LLP, Sa'd launched her own practice that specializes in criminal, housing, and cannabis law in 2017. She serves on the advisory board of Legal Line, and in 2019 ran unsuccessfully to be a bencher at the Law Society of Ontario, finishing in 28th place with 15.8% of the vote. She ran again in 2023 and came in 38th place with 8.6% of the vote.

In 2019, Sa'd represented tenants displaced by a fatal fire from 235 Gosford Boulevard apartment block in Toronto. She organized an open letter to Toronto Mayor John Tory, requesting him to block reoccupation of the building until air quality issues were addressed.

In 2021, Sa'd represented tenants who rented illegal apartments from Toronto landlord Brad J. Lamb, pushing for financial compensation for those evicted, and persuaded a judge to give more time to two tenants whose rent was delayed due to hardship caused by the COVID-19 pandemic.

In 2023, Sa'd was herself the subject of an order evicting her from her residential premises in Toronto after she failed to appear at her own hearing before the Landlord and Tenant Board.

== Activism and protest coverage ==
=== Cannabis activism ===
In 2019, Sa'd described Ontario's lottery system of providing retail cannabis licences as "unfair" because it excluded potential licensees based on luck, not experience or relevant skills. In 2021, she campaigned for the rights of small cannabis businesses, and criticized Facebook and Instagram for blocking their posts despite the legality of selling cannabis in Canada.

Sa'd co-founded 420 Cannabis Court, a pop-up outdoor cannabis-friendly lounge that existed during the 2020 COVID-19 lockdowns and hosted live comedy acts. It was held in the Anti-Displacement Garden of the Chinatown Centre, which caused conflict with neighbouring businesses and the not-for-profit arts collective Tea Base, which had created the garden for community use. From March 2020 to October 2021 she was the executive director of the Canadian branch of the National Organization for the Reform of Marijuana Laws (NORML).

=== Protest coverage ===
Throughout 2021, Sa'd documented and published footage of anti-vaccination and COVID-19 anti-lockdown protests in Toronto. In July 2021, she invited anti-lockdown activist Chris Sky to appear before an audience at her venue in Toronto's Chinatown for a live interview. A community group, Friends of Chinatown, and other tenants in the mall urged her to cancel the event because of concerns about community safety. Sa'd declined to cancel it, but the event was ultimately called off after opponents of Sky gathered at the site and police were called following scuffles.

In 2022, Sa'd spent several weeks in Ottawa documenting the Canada convoy protest and subsequently live-tweeted the bail hearings of organizers Pat King and Tamara Lich.

Sa'd has worked with videographer Adam Lee Wasserman in documenting demonstrations and other political events. In January 2025, Wasserman was allegedly spat upon while filming at Yonge and Dundas streets; an assault charge arising from the incident was later withdrawn by the Crown.

Wasserman was arrested while covering the 2025 Walk with Israel and was charged with criminal harassment and assault. Following a five-day trial in the Ontario Court of Justice in Brampton, he was acquitted of both charges on July 30, 2026.

By 2026, Sa'd had become a regular presence at demonstrations in Toronto, including pro-Israel and pro-Palestinian protests and earlier anti-lockdown, anti-vaccine and convoy-related events. Her methods attracted criticism from some demonstrators with several frequent protesters describing Sa'd and her cameraman's filming as intrusive, while the Toronto Star reported concerns that her presence could be provocative and that short clips posted online could expose participants to unwanted attention or harassment.

Sa'd rejected those criticisms, saying that she documented public conduct rather than provoking it and that she attempted to report demonstrations without taking sides on their underlying political causes. She said her focus was on whether conduct in Canada accorded with the rule of law and whether policing was reasonable, inadequate or ineffective.

Sa'd has also drawn criticism for interviewing or interacting with controversial political figures and extremists. The Canadian Anti-Hate Network has argued that engagement with some such figures can amplify their messages, while other critics have pointed to her interactions with people including Ezra Levant. Sa'd has defended speaking with people across ideological lines, arguing that hearing out a position does not entail accepting it and that people should not be excluded from public life or services solely because they have been labelled in a particular way.

=== Canadian Anti-Hate Network ===
The Canadian Anti-Hate Network criticized Sa'd's planned 2021 interview with anti-lockdown activist Chris Sky, describing Sky as a racist and Holocaust denier and saying that anti-racist and anti-fascist protesters had asked Sa'd to reconsider hosting him.

In 2023, Sa'd filed a Federal Court action against Morgan Yew, the Canadian Anti-Hate Network, and John or Jane Doe. The statement of claim alleged false or misleading remarks and sought declarations, damages and injunctions under the Trademarks Act and Competition Act. On September 25, 2023, Justice Richard Southcott of the Federal Court of Canada struck the statement of claim without leave to amend, finding that it disclosed no reasonable cause of action. The court ordered Sa'd to pay $850 in costs to the defendants.

Sa'd later became the subject of a complaint to the Law Society of Ontario concerning her conduct toward Bernie Farber, chair emeritus of the Canadian Anti-Hate Network. According to a 2024 complaint-closure letter, a Law Society investigator concluded that Sa'd had failed to act with honour and integrity and had engaged in harassing and/or discriminatory conduct and conduct tending to bring discredit upon the legal profession. The Law Society closed the matter without referring it for disciplinary proceedings, stating that the available regulatory responses were limited and that Sa'd had been advised of the findings.

In June 2026, Sa'd approached Farber while he was entering his car and asked whether he would "denounce antifa" and whether he was proud of his legacy. Asked about the incident by the Toronto Star, Sa'd rejected the characterization of her conduct as harassment.

In November 2024, the Canadian Anti-Hate Network published a statement saying that it had asked Sa'd to stop interacting with members of the organization and published a letter from its lawyer concerning her conduct toward CAHN members and affiliates.

=== Other controversies ===
Sa'd was arrested for trespassing by police on May 26, 2022, while attempting to enter a campaign rally for Doug Ford at John C. Munro Hamilton International Airport. Sa'd said police had inaccurately characterized her as a protester attempting to block access to the rally. The charge was withdrawn in November 2022 after prosecutors concluded there was no reasonable prospect of conviction.

In December 2023, Sa'd posted video of several employees of a downtown Toronto Moxies restaurant cheering an anti-war, pro-Palestinian march during the Gaza war. CBC News reported that the employees were later fired, and included the incident in a broader report about people in Canada facing employment or school consequences after expressing pro-Palestinian views. Sa'd defended posting the video, while critics argued that publicizing workers' identities contributed to consequences for people expressing political views.

== 2026 Toronto municipal election ==
On August 21, 2026, Sa'd registered as a candidate for Ward 14 Toronto—Danforth in the 2026 Toronto municipal election. The ward became an open race after incumbent councillor Paula Fletcher announced that she would not seek re-election.

Sa'd told the Toronto Star that she was running in part because she believed activism had too much influence over decisions at Toronto City Hall. She criticized what she characterized as excessive municipal spending on homelessness and the normalization of public disorder, particularly surrounding demonstrations. She said that she did not claim to have all the solutions and wanted to work with different stakeholders to address gaps in existing city policy.

Her campaign emphasized affordability, accessibility and accountability, alongside concerns about public disorder, drug use and sanitation in public spaces. She also criticized Mayor Olivia Chow's connections to progressive advocacy organizations, including Progress Toronto and the Broadbent Institute.

The Toronto—Danforth contest also attracted several candidates with previous political experience, including Ward 11 University—Rosedale councillor Dianne Saxe, now running in Ward 14, Toronto District School Board trustee Sara Ehrhardt, and former city councillor Mary Fragedakis. Sa'd, a "pro-wrestling aficionado" described the crowded contest as "the royal rumble" that "any man, any woman can win".

Her candidacy was endorsed by IntegrityTO, a right-wing municipal political advocacy organization founded by Daniel Tate.

Sa'd finished sixth among 18 candidates, receiving 986 votes (2.14%), behind Ehrhardt, Fragedakis, and Saxe.

2026 Toronto municipal election, Ward 14 Toronto—Danforth
Candidate	Votes	%
Sara Ehrhardt	22,440	48.78
Mary Fragedakis	10,425	22.66
Dianne Saxe	3,857	8.38
Susan Chapelle	1,675	3.64
Maria Voutsinas	1,658	3.60
Caryma Sa'd	986	2.14
Maqsood Ahmad	847	1.84
Denise Walcott	651	1.42
Peter De Marco	594	1.29
Michael Connor	591	1.28
Christiane Tetreault	520	1.13
George Fawcett	433	0.94
Michael Mitchell	328	0.71
John Kladitis	287	0.62
Jason Stevens	268	0.58
Devyn Stackhouse	169	0.37
Dennis Corcoran	149	0.32
Robb Dagenais	128	0.28
Source: City of Toronto

== Family life ==
Sa'd's father died of COVID-19 in March 2021.
