= 2026 Toronto municipal election =

2026 municipal election in Toronto, Ontario, Canada

- October 26, 2026
- Mayoral election
Mayor before election
Olivia Chow
Elected mayor
Olivia Chow
- City councillor election
Incumbent speaker
Frances Nunziata

Municipal elections were held on October 26, 2026, to elect the mayor and 25 city councillors in Toronto, Ontario, Canada. In addition, school trustees were elected to the Toronto District School Board, Toronto Catholic District School Board, Conseil scolaire Viamonde and Conseil scolaire catholique MonAvenir. The election was held in conjunction with those held in other municipalities in the province of Ontario.

The nomination period for candidates opened on May 1, 2026, at 8:30 am and closed on August 21, 2026, at 2 pm.

== Mayoral election ==
On May 25, 2026, incumbent mayor Olivia Chow formally declared her candidacy in the 2026 Toronto mayoral election. She was challenged by Toronto city councillor Brad Bradford. She was re-elected.

== City council elections ==
=== Changes in membership between elections ===
- Gary Crawford, councillor for Ward 20 Scarborough Southwest since 2010, resigned to run for the Progressive Conservative Party of Ontario in the 2023 Scarborough—Guildwood provincial by-election. The by-election to replace him was won by Parthi Kandavel.
- Jennifer McKelvie, councillor for Ward 25 Scarborough—Rouge Park since 2018, resigned to run for the Liberal Party of Canada in the 2025 Canadian federal election. The by-election to replace her was won by Neethan Shan.
- Jaye Robinson, councillor for Ward 15 Don Valley West since 2010, died in 2024. The by-election to replace her was won by Rachel Chernos Lin.

=== Incumbents not standing for re-election ===
- Brad Bradford, councillor for Ward 19 Beaches—East York since 2018, ran for mayor of Toronto, lost.
- Paula Fletcher, city councillor for Ward 14 Toronto—Danforth since 2003, announced her retirement having changed her mind two days after registering for re-election.
- Gord Perks, city councillor for Ward 4 Parkdale—High Park since 2006.
- Dianne Saxe, city councillor for Ward 11 University—Rosedale since 2022, registered to run for re-election but withdrew on August 21 and registered instead to run for election in Ward 14 Toronto—Danforth.

=== Ward 1 Etobicoke North ===
Incumbent city councillor Vincent Crisanti was elected in 2022, having previously sat on council from 2010 to 2018, and ran for re-election.

Registered candidates

- Abraham Abbey
- Ala'a Adib, endorsed by Toronto & York Region Labour Council, Progress Toronto, and councillor Josh Matlow
- Saima Babar
- Chloe Brown, third-place finisher in the 2022 mayoral election.
- Vincent Crisanti, incumbent, endorsed by ABC Toronto
- Norman Hamilton
- Joseph Martino
- Nathen Masri
- Hard Parmar
- Kristian Santos

Results

Candidate	Votes	%	minus
Vincent Crisanti (X)	12,804	45.51	4.44 ▲
Ala'a Adib	4,005	14.24	–
Chloe Brown	3,207	11.40	–
Kristian Santos	2,165	7.70	4.01 ▲
Saima Babar	1,475	5.24	–
Norman Hamilton	1,438	5.11	–
Hard Parmar	1,256	4.46	–
Joseph Martino	979	3.48	–
Nathen Masri	415	1.48	–
Abraham Abbey	389	1.38	0.34 ▼

=== Ward 2 Etobicoke Centre ===
Incumbent city councillor Stephen Holyday was first elected in 2014 and ran for re-election.

Registered candidates

- Jennifer Alexander
- Katie Andrachuk
- Stephen Holyday, incumbent, endorsed by ABC Toronto

Results

Candidate	Vote	%	minus
Stephen Holyday (X)	25,606	57.73	14.55 ▼
Katie Andrachuk	12,238	27.59	–
Jennifer Alexander	6,508	14.67	–

=== Ward 3 Etobicoke—Lakeshore ===
Incumbent city councillor Amber Morley was first elected in 2022 and registered to run for re-election.

Registered candidates

- Mihaela Andrei
- Anthony Internicola
- Amber Morley, incumbent, endorsed by Toronto & York Region Labour Council, Eileen de Villa, and Ajax MP and former Ward 25 Scarborough—Rouge Park councillor Jennifer McKelvie
- Ted Opitz, former Conservative MP for Etobicoke Centre (2011—2015), endorsed by ABC Toronto

Withdrawn

- Cody MacRae (withdrew August 21)

Opinion polling

Polling firm	Source	Polling dates	Sample size	MOE	Amber Morley	Ted Opitz	Anthony Internicola	Mihaela Andrei	Other	Lead
Mainstreet Research (Note: Mainstreet reported results including "no preferred candidate" (12.3% in Ward 3, 6.8% in Ward 5, 11.5% in Ward 13). Figures shown are shares among decided voters.)	IVR	October 14–16, 2026	342	±5.3%	36.6%	52.9%	2.6%	7.9%	0.0%	16.3
Forum Research	IVR/Online	September 25–27, 2026	535	±4.0%	40%	27%	14%	7%	12%	13

Results

Candidate	Votes	%	minus
Amber Morley (X)	25,521	48.40	1.96 ▲
Ted Opitz	19,494	36.97	–
Mihaela Andrei	5,329	10.11	–
Anthony Internicola	2,381	4.52	–

=== Ward 4 Parkdale—High Park ===
Incumbent city councillor Gord Perks was first elected in 2006. He announced on April 30, 2026 that he will not be standing for re-election.

Registered candidates

- Michael Corcoran
- Nadia Guerrera, Ontario Liberal Party candidate in York South—Weston for the 2022 provincial election and in Parkdale—High Park for the 2025 provincial election, endorsed by former Premier of Ontario Kathleen Wynne
- Debbie King, TDSB school trustee endorsed by Toronto & York Region Labour Council
- Diana Chan McNally, housing advocate, endorsed by Progress Toronto, incumbent councillor Gord Perks, former Mayor of Toronto David Miller, Parkdale—High Park MPP Alexa Gilmour, ATU Local 113, and CUPE 79.
- Bridget Ogundipe
- Adam Pham
- Andy Potega
- Vanessa Raponi
- Holly Weber
- Steve Yuen

Withdrawn

- Jonathan Nikolaou (withdrew June 3)
- Lloyd Traiforos (withdrew August 18)

Opinion polling

Polling firm	Source	Polling dates	Sample size	MOE	Debbie King	Nadia Guerrera	Diana Chan McNally	Adam Pham	Vanessa Raponi	Other	Lead
Forum Research	IVR/Online	October 15–18, 2026	594	±4.0%	16%	32%	29%	—	17%	6%	3
Mainstreet Research	IVR	October 14–16, 2026	262	±6.1%	3.3%	35.2%	29.2%	15.5%	3.4%	3.8%	6.0
Forum Research	IVR/Online	September 25–27, 2026	464	±4.5%	37%	23%	18%	—	6%	16%	14

Results

Candidate	Votes	%	minus
Diana Chan McNally	20,314	42.47	–
Nadia Guerrera	13,275	27.75	–
Adam Pham	6,346	13.27	–
Debbie King	2,949	6.16	–
Vanessa Raponi	1,762	3.68	–
Bridget Ogundipe	1,005	2.10	–
Holly Weber	882	1.84	–
Michael Corcoran	579	1.21	–
Steve Yuen	473	0.99	1.64 ▼
Andy Potega	251	0.52	–

=== Ward 5 York South—Weston ===
Incumbent city councillor Frances Nunziata was first elected to Toronto City Council in 1998 and registered to run for re-election.

Registered candidates

- Sharmarke Ali
- Matthew Boateng
- Daniel Di Giorgio, Catholic school trustee
- Maryama Farah
- Ahmed Mawel
- Frances Nunziata, incumbent, endorsed by ABC Toronto
- Nekpen Obasogie
- Chiara Padovani, tenant advocate, runner-up in Ward 5 in the 2022 municipal election, endorsed by Toronto & York Region Labour Council, Progress Toronto, and former Mayor of Toronto David Miller
- Sileen Phillips

Opinion polling

Polling firm	Source	Polling dates	Sample size	MOE	Frances Nunziata	Daniel Di Giorgio	Chiara Padovani	Other	Lead
Forum Research	IVR/Online	October 15–18, 2026	543	±4.0%	34%	30%	28%	7%	4
Mainstreet Research	IVR	October 14–16, 2026	328	±5.4%	41.3%	21.0%	22.2%	15.5%	19.1
Forum Research	IVR	June 22–23, 2026	301	±6.0%	42%	24%	20%	13%	18

Results

Candidate	Votes	%	minus
Chiara Padovani	13,407	39.10	8.06 ▼
Daniel Di Giorgio	9,818	28.63	–
Frances Nunziata (X)	7,441	21.70	25.91 ▼
Matthew Boateng	910	2.65	–
Ahmed Mawel	705	2.06	–
Sharmarke Ali	679	1.98	–
Sileen Phillips	607	1.77	–
Maryama Farah	537	1.57	–
Nekpen Obasogie	183	0.53	–

=== Ward 6 York Centre ===
Incumbent city councillor James Pasternak was first elected in 2010 with and registered to run for re-election.

Registered candidates

- Alexander Artamonov
- Conroy Irving
- James Pasternak, incumbent, endorsed by ABC Toronto and former Kitchener South—Hespeler MP Valerie Bradford

Results

Candidate	Votes	%	minus
James Pasternak (X)	23,223	70.99	4.54 ▼
Conroy Irving	7,001	21.40	–
Alexander Artamonov	2,487	7.60	–

=== Ward 7 Humber River—Black Creek ===
Incumbent city councillor Anthony Perruzza was first elected to Toronto City Council in 2006 and registered to run for re-election.

Registered candidates

- Lorna Antwi
- Amanda Coombs
- Anthony Perruzza, incumbent, endorsed by Toronto & York Region Labour Council and ABC Toronto

Results

Candidate	Votes	%	minus
Anthony Perruzza (X)	15,947	66.38	5.08 ▲
Amanda Coombs	6,097	25.38	9.31 ▲
Lorna Antwi	1,979	8.24	–

=== Ward 8 Eglinton—Lawrence ===
Incumbent city councillor Mike Colle was first elected in 2018 and registered to run for re-election.

Registered candidates

- Mike Colle, incumbent, endorsed by ABC Toronto
- Liz Grade
- Domenico Maiolo
- Jason McDonald
- Enzo Torrone
- Daniel Trayes

Results

Candidate	Votes	%	minus
Mike Colle (X)	32,085	70.26	0.05 ▼
Liz Grade	4,914	10.76	–
Jason McDonald	4,417	9.67	–
Enzo Torrone	2,591	5.67	–
Domenico Maiolo	1,001	2.19	0.08 ▲
Daniel Trayes	657	1.44	–

=== Ward 9 Davenport ===
Incumbent city councillor Alejandra Bravo was first elected in 2022 and registered to run for re-election.

Registered candidates

- Alejandra Bravo, incumbent, endorsed by Toronto & York Region Labour Council and Ontario New Democratic Party leader Marit Stiles
- Ashley Jansen
- Marco Martins, endorsed by ABC Toronto
- Neil Simon

Results

Candidate	Vote	%	minus
Alejandra Bravo (X)	28,179	66.46	4.26 ▼
Marco Martins	11,633	27.44	–
Ashley Jansen	1,396	3.29	–
Neil Simon	1,192	2.81	–

=== Ward 10 Spadina—Fort York ===
Incumbent city councillor Ausma Malik was first elected in 2022 and registered to run for re-election.

Registered candidates

- Ian Cunningham, endorsed by ABC Toronto and former Toronto Centre MPP Glen Murray
- Xue Ding
- Andi Hoàng-Lefranc, lawyer
- Bashar Kassir
- Ausma Malik, incumbent, endorsed by Toronto & York Region Labour Council and former Mayor of Toronto Barbara Hall
- Paul Nash
- Husain Neemuchwala
- Aanchal Vashistha

Opinion polling

Polling firm	Source	Polling dates	Sample size	MOE	Ausma Malik	Ian Cunningham	Husain Neemuchwala	Paul Nash	Xue Ding	Bashar Kassir	No preferred candidate	Lead
Mainstreet Research (Note: Mainstreet reported results including "no preferred candidate" (9.5% in Ward 4, 13.4% in Ward 10). Figures shown are shares among decided voters.)	IVR	October 14–16, 2026	292	±5.7%	39.1%	37.6%	3.2%	2.9%	1.6%	1.6%	13.4%	1.5

Results

Candidate	Votes	%	minus
Ausma Malik (X)	21,975	47.29	10.74 ▲
Ian Cunningham	13,405	28.85	–
Xue Ding	3,767	8.11	–
Paul Nash	2,805	6.04	–
Andi Hoàng-Lefranc	2,113	4.55	–
Bashar Kassir	940	2.02	–
Aanchal Vashistha	930	2.00	–
Husain Neemuchwala	536	1.15	–

=== Ward 11 University—Rosedale ===
Incumbent city councillor Dianne Saxe was first elected in 2022 and registered to run for re-election. She withdrew on August 21 and registered to run instead in Ward 14 Toronto—Danforth.

Registered candidates

- Keenan Courtis
- Terri Hawkes, actress, endorsed by ABC Toronto and former Prime Minister Joe Clark
- Mike Layton, former Toronto City Councillor for Ward 11 University—Rosedale and its predecessor, Ward 19 Trinity—Spadina (2010—2022), endorsed by Toronto & York Region Labour Council.
- Karina Lemke, endorsed by ABC Toronto
- Alice Li
- Huy Lieu
- Gian Pileri
- Paul Viret
- Diana Yoon, runner-up and federal NDP candidate in Spadina—Fort York in the 2019 federal election

Withdrawn

- Gabe Blanc, former policy analyst for Councillor Shelley Carroll (withdrew August 21, endorsed Layton)
- Dana Fisher, (withdrew August 20, endorsed Layton)
- Dianne Saxe, incumbent (withdrew August 21, running instead in Ward 14 Toronto—Danforth)

Opinion polling

Polling firm	Source	Polling dates	Sample size	MOE	Dianne Saxe	Diana Yoon	Dana Fisher	Gabe Blanc	Other	Lead
Forum Research	IVR	August 12, 2026	449	±5.0%	41%	9%	8%	5%	37%	32

Results

Candidate	Votes	%	minus
Mike Layton	19,388	46.22	23.34* ▼
Diana Yoon	8,003	19.08	17.38 ▲
Karina Lemke	5,540	13.21	–
Terri Hawkes	3,782	9.02	–
Alice Li	2,877	6.86	–
Keenan Courtis	1,568	3.74	–
Gian Pileri	425	1.01	–
Paul Viret	236	0.56	–
Huy Lieu	125	0.30	–

Compared to 2018*

=== Ward 12 Toronto—St. Paul's ===
Incumbent city councillor Josh Matlow was first elected in 2010 and registered to run for re-election.

Registered candidates

- David Cottrell
- Jenny Kalimbet, endorsed by ABC Toronto
- Ahmed Kamal
- Josh Matlow, incumbent
- Bob Murphy
- Mina Nadimi

Withdrawn

- Joshua Kishner (withdrew August 20)

Results

Candidate	Vote	%	minus
Josh Matlow (X)	32,781	67.56	17.09 ▼
Jenny Kalimbet	9,187	18.93	–
David Cottrell	2,228	4.59	–
Mina Nadimi	1,506	3.10	–
Ahmed Kamal	1,421	2.93	–
Bob Murphy	1,400	2.89	1.50 ▼

=== Ward 13 Toronto Centre ===
Incumbent city councillor Chris Moise was first elected in 2022 and registered to run for re-election.

Registered candidates

- Joe Cadeau, former tech company executive
- Tom Cai
- Victoria Davis
- Morgan Harris
- Walied Khogali Ali, co-chair of the Regent Park Neighbourhood Association, fifth-place candidate in Ward 13 in the 2018 election, co-founder of TTCriders
- Norman MacLeod
- Cleveland Marshall
- Chris Moise, incumbent
- Curran Stikuts, former director strategic communications and advocacy of The 519 community centre, endorsed by Toronto & York Region Labour Council and Toronto Centre MPP Kristyn Wong-Tam
- Daniel Tate, founder of IntegrityTO, endorsed by ABC Toronto
- Nicki Ward, former president of the largest housing co-op in Canada, runner-up in Ward 13 in the 2022 election, Green Party candidate in Toronto Centre in the 2022 provincial election

Declined

- Kristyn Wong-Tam, NDP MPP for Toronto Centre (2022–present), former councillor (2010–2022), endorsed Stikuts

Opinion polling

Polling firm	Source	Polling dates	Sample size	MOE	Chris Moise	Daniel Tate	Curran Stikuts	Walied Khogali Ali	Other	Lead
Forum Research	IVR/Online	October 15–18, 2026	648	±4.0%	34%	30%	25%	—	11%	4
Mainstreet Research	IVR	October 14–16, 2026	348	±5.3%	49.5%	19.1%	17.9%	—	13.6%	30.4
Forum Research	IVR/Online	September 25–27, 2026	519	±4.0%	29%	26%	13%	8%	25%	3
Forum Research	IVR	August 19, 2026	390	±5.0%	24%	14%	7%	4%	51%	10
Forum Research	IVR	June 22–23, 2026	355	±5.0%	35%	19%	6%	—	40%	16

Results

Candidate	Votes	%	minus
Curran Stikuts	11,877	28.62	–
Chris Moise (X)	9,690	23.35	25.13 ▼
Daniel Tate	6,288	15.15	–
Walied Khogali Ali	3,368	8.12	–
Nicki Ward	2,610	6.29	11.98 ▼
Joe Cadeau	2,431	5.86	–
Victoria Davis	2,127	5.13	–
Morgan Harris	1,057	2.55	–
Tom Cai	907	2.19	–
Norman MacLeod	681	1.64	–
Cleveland Marshall	462	1.11	0.74 ▼

=== Ward 14 Toronto—Danforth ===
Incumbent city councillor Paula Fletcher was first elected in 2003 and registered to run for re-election but subsequently decided to retire.

Registered candidates

- Maqsood Ahmad
- Susan Chapelle
- Michael Connor
- Dennis Corcoran
- Robb Dagenais
- Peter De Marco
- Sara Ehrhardt, TDSB school trustee, endorsed by Toronto & York Region Labour Council, Progress Toronto, Toronto—Danforth MPP Peter Tabuns, incumbent councillor Paula Fletcher, and former Ward 11 University—Rosedale councillor Mike Layton
- George Fawcett
- Mary Fragedakis, former Toronto City Councillor for Toronto—Danforth (2010–2018), Liberal candidate in Toronto—Danforth in the 2022 Ontario general election
- John Kladitis
- Michael Mitchell
- Caryma Sa'd, internet personality
- Dianne Saxe, incumbent councillor for Ward 11 University—Rosedale (2022–present), endorsed by ABC Toronto
- Devyn Stackhouse
- Jason Stevens
- Christiane Tetreault
- Maria Voutsinas, former executive director of the National Ethnic Press and Media Council of Canada
- Denise Walcott

Withdrawn

- Paula Fletcher, incumbent (withdrew August 19)

Opinion polling

Polling firm	Source	Polling dates	Sample size	MOE	Sara Ehrhardt	Mary Fragedakis	Dianne Saxe	Other	Lead
Forum Research	IVR/Online	October 15–18, 2026	604	±4.0%	40%	26%	22%	12%	14

Results

Candidate	Votes	%	minus
Sara Ehrhardt	22,440	48.78	–
Mary Fragedakis	10,425	22.66	–
Dianne Saxe	3,857	8.38	–
Susan Chapelle	1,675	3.64	–
Maria Voutsinas	1,658	3.60	–
Caryma Sa'd	986	2.14	–
Maqsood Ahmad	847	1.84	–
Denise Walcott	651	1.42	4.92 ▼
Peter De Marco	594	1.29	–
Michael Connor	591	1.28	–
Christiane Tetreault	520	1.13	–
George Fawcett	433	0.94	–
Michael Mitchell	328	0.71	–
John Kladitis	287	0.62	–
Jason Stevens	268	0.58	–
Devyn Stackhouse	169	0.37	–
Dennis Corcoran	149	0.32	–
Robb Dagenais	128	0.28	–

=== Ward 15 Don Valley West ===
Incumbent city councillor Rachel Chernos Lin was first elected in 2024 in a by-election and registered to run for re-election.

Registered candidates

- Rachel Chernos Lin, incumbent, endorsed by ABC Toronto
- Sheena Sharp
- Denis Tsang

Results

Candidate	Votes	%	minus
Rachel Chernos Lin (X)	23,434	67.47	12.71* ▲
Sheena Sharp	7,863	22.64	20.20* ▲
Denis Tsang	3,437	9.90	–

Compared to by-election*

=== Ward 16 Don Valley East ===
Incumbent city councillor Jon Burnside was elected in 2022, having previously sat on council from 2014 to 2018, and registered to run for re-election.

Registered candidates

- Jon Burnside, incumbent, endorsed by ABC Toronto
- Sinan Erdemir
- Didi Moffat
- Stacey Moffatt

Results

Candidate	Votes	%	minus
Jon Burnside (X)	19,654	71.35	26.67 ▲
Sinan Erdemir	3,370	12.23	–
Stacey Moffatt	2,337	8.48	–
Didi Moffat	2,185	7.93	–

=== Ward 17 Don Valley North ===
Incumbent city councillor Shelley Carroll was first elected in 2003 and registered to run for re-election.

Registered candidates

- Jeffery Adamson
- Shelley Carroll, incumbent, endorsed by Toronto & York Region Labour Council and ABC Toronto
- Jethro Adir Kavod
- Hassan Mubarak Noor Mohamed
- Roy Samathanam
- Hong Xiao
- Sabrina Zuniga

Withdrawn

- Gregory Rodriguez (withdrew July 27)

Results

Candidate	Votes	%	minus
Shelley Carroll (X)	19,042	62.02	9.77 ▼
Sabrina Zuniga	4,130	13.45	–
Jeffery Adamson	2,314	7.54	–
Hong Xiao	2,011	6.55	–
Hassan Mubarak Noor Mohamed	1,974	6.43	–
Roy Samathanam	732	2.38	–
Jethro Adir Kavod	498	1.62	–

=== Ward 18 Willowdale ===
Incumbent city councillor Lily Cheng was first elected in 2022 and registered to run for re-election.

Registered candidates

- Lily Cheng, incumbent, endorsed by ABC Toronto
- Nicole Daneshvar
- David Magazzinich
- Hamid Shakeri
- Nathan Yusifov
- Ardeshir Zarezade

Results

Candidate	Votes	%	minus
Lily Cheng (X)	20,746	63.10	21.38 ▲
David Magazzinich	6,804	20.69	–
Ardeshir Zarezade	2,445	7.44	–
Hamid Shakeri	1,129	3.43	–
Nicole Daneshvar	1,115	3.39	–
Nathan Yusifov	639	1.94	–

=== Ward 19 Beaches—East York ===
Incumbent city councillor Brad Bradford was first elected in 2018 and has declined to run for re-election, instead running for mayor.

Registered candidates

- Syeda Jaana Ali
- James Dann, former manager of waterfront parks for the City of Toronto
- Nate Erskine-Smith, Liberal MP for Beaches—East York (2015–2026), endorsed by Toronto & York Region Labour Council.
- Fatima Ibrahimi
- Natalie Johnson, journalist with CTV News Toronto, endorsed by former Premier of Ontario Kathleen Wynne
- Kevin Morrison, Toronto Catholic District School Board trustee
- Karsten Riedel
- Mohammad Shabani
- Adam Smith, third-place finisher in 2022
- Austin Vieira
- Jeff Wahl
- Devin Wilkins
- Jennie Worden, non-profit manager, runner-up in 2022

Withdrawn

- Tycen Legg (withdrew August 21)

Opinion polling

Polling firm	Source	Polling dates	Sample size	MOE	Nate Erskine-Smith	Natalie Johnson	James Dann	Jennie Worden	Other	Lead
Forum Research	IVR/Online	October 15–20, 2026	1,084	±3.0%	32%	26%	22%	16%	4%	6
Forum Research	IVR/Online	September 25–27, 2026	474	±4.5%	52%	24%	6%	6%	12%	28
Forum Research	IVR	August 11–12, 2026	386	±5.0%	53%	19%	7%	—	21%	34
Forum Research	IVR	June 22–23, 2026	367	±5.0%	69%	16%	9%	—	5%	54

Results

Candidate	Votes	%	minus
Nate Erskine-Smith	21,472	46.75	–
Natalie Johnson	11,187	24.36	–
James Dann	5,461	11.89	–
Jennie Worden	3,723	8.11	14.58 ▼
Kevin Morrison	1,029	2.24	–
Adam Smith	899	1.96	4.90 ▼
Fatima Ibrahimi	511	1.11	–
Syeda Jaana Ali	466	1.01	–
Karsten Riedel	336	0.73	–
Mohammad Shabani	301	0.66	–
Devin Wilkins	213	0.46	–
Austin Vieira	205	0.45	–
Jeff Wahl	127	0.28	–

=== Ward 20 Scarborough Southwest ===
Incumbent city councillor Parthi Kandavel was first elected in 2023 in a by-election and registered to run for re-election. At the time of the election, Kandavel was under investigation by the Ontario Provincial Police.

Registered candidates

- Laikul Choudhury
- Naser Kaid
- Parthi Kandavel, incumbent, sought Ontario Liberal Party nomination in 2018
- Ariel-Rachel Karokis
- Luigi Lisciandro
- Sharmina Nasrin
- Mohammad Ali Reza
- Kevin Rupasinghe, runner-up in Ward 20 in 2023 municipal by-election and third-place finisher in 2022, endorsed by Toronto & York Region Labour Council and Progress Toronto

Withdrawn

- Malik Ahmad (withdrew August 21)
- Beau Duquesnay (withdrew August 14)
- Philip Mills (withdrew August 18)

Opinion polling

Polling firm	Source	Polling dates	Sample size	MOE	Parthi Kandavel	Glenn De Baeremaeker	Kevin Rupasinghe	Philip Mills	Mohammad Ali Reza	Other	Lead
Forum Research	IVR/Online	October 15–18, 2026	538	±4.0%	41%	—	38%	—	—	21%	3
Forum Research	IVR	August 18, 2026	269	±6.0%	33%	—	27%	9%	7%	25%	6
Forum Research	IVR	June 22–23, 2026	311	±6.0%	37%	28%	25%	—	—	10%	9

Results

Candidate	Votes	%	minus
Parthi Kandavel (X)	12,231	35.99	8.61* ▲
Kevin Rupasinghe	10,513	30.93	8.19* ▲
Sharmina Nasrin	3,013	8.86	–
Ariel-Rachel Karokis	2,573	7.57	–
Luigi Lisciandro	2,432	7.16	–
Mohammad Ali Reza	1,523	4.48	–
Laikul Choudhury	1,169	3.44	–
Naser Kaid	535	1.57	–

Compared to by-election*

=== Ward 21 Scarborough Centre ===
Incumbent city councillor Michael Thompson was first elected in 2003 and registered to run for re-election.

Registered candidates

- Taiba Ahmed
- Bahareh Barahmand
- Patience Evbagharu
- Uthish Ganesh, teacher
- Stella Kargiannakis
- Nisha Kumari
- Akina Lalla
- Willie Reodica
- Madura Shanmugaratnam
- Michael Thompson, incumbent, endorsed by ABC Toronto
- Krissan Veerasingam, former board co-chair of TTCriders, endorsed by Toronto & York Region Labour Council and Progress Toronto

Results

Candidate	Votes	%	minus
Michael Thompson (X)	16,053	51.10	4.15 ▼
Krissan Veerasingam	4,653	14.81	–
Taiba Ahmed	2,003	6.38	–
Stella Kargiannakis	1,984	6.32	–
Uthish Ganesh	1,695	5.40	–
Akina Lalla	1,174	3.74	–
Willie Reodica	1,130	3.60	–
Bahareh Barahmand	1,015	3.23	–
Madura Shanmugaratnam	952	3.03	–
Nisha Kumari	504	1.60	–
Patience Evbagharu	251	0.80	–

=== Ward 22 Scarborough—Agincourt ===
Incumbent city councillor Nick Mantas was first elected in 2021 and registered to run for re-election.

Registered candidates

- Madhuri Azad
- Bill Chan
- Jackson Ho
- Serge Khatchadourian
- Rakhee Kotecha
- Aaron Lal
- Dan Lovell, ran for the NDP in Scarborough—Agincourt in the 2025 federal election, endorsed by Toronto & York Region Labour Council
- Nick Mantas, incumbent, endorsed by ABC Toronto
- Donny Morgan
- Sindia Vijayarajan

Results

Candidate	Votes	%	minus
Nick Mantas (X)	11,308	40.74	8.15 ▼
Bill Chan	4,815	17.35	–
Donny Morgan	3,283	11.83	–
Dan Lovell	2,529	9.11	–
Jackson Ho	1,660	5.98	–
Sindia Vijayarajan	1,170	4.22	–
Madhuri Azad	1,161	4.18	–
Serge Khatchadourian	1,106	3.98	4.24 ▼
Aaron Lal	452	1.63	–
Rakhee Kotecha	273	0.98	–

=== Ward 23 Scarborough North ===
Incumbent city councillor Jamaal Myers was first elected in 2022 and registered to run for re-election.

Registered candidates

- Shaun Chen, former Liberal MP for Scarborough North (2015–2026), endorsed by ABC Toronto
- Han Dong, former MP Don Valley North (2018–2025), former Liberal MPP Trinity—Spadina (2014–2018), endorsed by former Mayor of Toronto John Tory
- Sajawal Javed
- Kevin Li
- Jamaal Myers, incumbent, endorsed by Toronto & York Region Labour Council
- John-Mark Oleh
- Ronald Phen
- Piravena Sathiyanantham

Opinion polling

Polling firm	Source	Polling dates	Sample size	MOE	Shaun Chen	Jamaal Myers	Han Dong	Kevin Li	John-Mark Oleh	Other	Lead
Forum Research	IVR/Online	October 15–18, 2026	512	±4.0%	42%	34%	12%	—	—	12%	8
Forum Research	IVR/Online	September 25–27, 2026	368	±5.0%	37%	31%	12%	8%	6%	7%	6

Results

Candidate	Votes	%	minus
Shaun Chen	9,828	35.88	–
Jamaal Myers (X)	6,943	25.34	25.75 ▼
Han Dong	3,676	13.42	–
Kevin Li	3,649	13.32	–
Piravena Sathiyanantham	2,708	9.89	–
Sajawal Javed	292	1.07	–
John-Mark Oleh	202	0.74	–
Ronald Phen	96	0.35	–

=== Ward 24 Scarborough—Guildwood ===
Incumbent city councillor Paul Ainslie was first elected in 2006 and registered to run for re-election.

Registered candidates

- Paul Ainslie, incumbent, endorsed by ABC Toronto
- Robert Bazil
- Jithender Mulamalla
- Nachi Ramasamy
- Arun Sivanandan
- An Wu

Withdrawn

- Rajinder Lall (withdrew August 21)

Results

Candidate	Votes	%	minus
Paul Ainslie (X)	20,305	72.26	4.26 ▼
Robert Bazil	2,590	9.22	–
Nachi Ramasamy	2,055	7.31	–
Arun Sivanandan	1,508	5.37	–
An Wu	1,265	4.50	–
Jithender Mulamalla	377	1.34	–

=== Ward 25 Scarborough—Rouge Park ===
Incumbent city councillor Neethan Shan was elected in 2025 in a by-election, having previously sat on council from 2017 to 2018, and registered to run for re-election.

Registered candidates

- Shawn Allen, president of the Scarborough Business Association, placed third in the 2025 by-election, endorsed by ABC Toronto
- Dharshan Casinathen
- Ashan Fernando
- Somas Kaneshapillai
- Jannette Lumley
- Zakir Patel, TDSB trustee for Scarborough-Guildwood
- Dianna Robinson
- Kannan S'ree Jr
- Neethan Shan, incumbent, endorsed by Toronto & York Region Labour Council and former councillor Glenn De Baeremaeker
- Vane Stavrev

Opinion polling

Polling firm	Source	Polling dates	Sample size	MOE	Shawn Allen	Neethan Shan	Zakir Patel	Dharshan Casinathen	Other	Lead
Mainstreet Research	IVR	October 14–16, 2026	340	±5.3%	37.1%	29.4%	11.6%	5.7%	16.3%	7.7

Results

Candidate	Votes	%	minus
Neethan Shan (X)	15,727	44.76	17.90* ▲
Shawn Allen	9,526	27.11	11.88* ▲
Zakir Patel	5,110	14.54	6.64* ▲
Dharshan Casinathen	1,885	5.36	–
Dianna Robinson	1,351	3.84	1.88* ▲
Ashan Fernando	645	1.84	0.90* ▲
Jannette Lumley	416	1.18	–
Somas Kaneshapillai	233	0.66	–
Vane Stavrev	176	0.50	–
Kannan S'ree Jr	71	0.20	–

Compared to by-election*

== Candidate endorsements ==
=== Toronto & York Region Labour Council ===
- Ala'a Adib, Ward 1 - 2nd place
- Amber Morley, Ward 3 - elected
- Debbie King, Ward 4 - 4th place
- Chiara Padovani, Ward 5 - elected
- Anthony Perruzza, Ward 7 - elected
- Alejandro Bravo, Ward 9 - elected
- Ausma Malik, Ward 10 - elected
- Mike Layton, Ward 11 - elected
- Curran Stikuts, Ward 13 - elected
- Sara Ehrhardt, Ward 14 - elected
- Shelley Carroll, Ward 17 - elected
- Nate Erskine-Smith, Ward 19 - elected
- Kevin Rupasinghe, Ward 20 - 2nd place
- Krissan Veerasingam, Ward 21 - 2nd place
- Dan Lovell, Ward 22 - 4th place
- Jamaal Myers, Ward 23 - 2nd place
- Neethan Shan, Ward 25 - elected

=== Progress Toronto ===
- Ala'a Adib, Ward 1 - 2nd place
- Diana Chan McNally, Ward 4 - elected
- Chiara Padovani, Ward 5 - elected
- Sara Ehrhardt, Ward 14 - elected
- Kevin Rupasinghe, Ward 20 - 2nd place
- Krissan Veerasingam, Ward 21 - 2nd place

=== ABC Toronto ===
- Vincent Crisanti, Ward 1 - elected
- Stephen Holyday, Ward 2 - elected
- Ted Opitz, Ward 3 - 2nd place
- Frances Nunziata, Ward 5 - 3rd place
- James Pasternak, Ward 6 - elected
- Anthony Perruzza, Ward 7 - elected
- Mike Colle, Ward 8 - elected
- Marco Martins, Ward 9 - 2nd place
- Ian Cunningham, Ward 10 - 2nd place
- Terri Hawkes, Ward 11 - 4th place
- Karina Lemke, Ward 11 - 3rd place
- Jenny Kalimbet, Ward 12 - 2nd place
- Daniel Tate, Ward 13 - 3rd place
- Diane Saxe, Ward 14 - 3rd place
- Rachel Chernos Lin, Ward 15- elected
- Jon Burnside, Ward 16 - elected
- Shelley Carroll, Ward 17 - elected
- Lily Cheng, Ward 18 - elected
- Michael Thompson, Ward 21 - elected
- Nick Mantas, Ward 22 - elected
- Shawn Chen, Ward 23 - elected
- Paul Ainslie, Ward 24 - elected
- Shawn Allen, Ward 25 - 2nd place

=== CUPE Local 79 ===
- Ala'a Adib, Ward 1 - 2nd place
- Amber Morley, Ward 3 - elected
- Diana Chan McNally, Ward 4 - elected
- Lorna Antwi - 3rd place & Anthony Perruzza - elected, Ward 7
- Alejandra Bravo, Ward 9 - elected
- Ausma Malik, Ward 10 - elected
- Diana Yoon - 2nd place & Mike Layton - elected, Ward 11
- Curran Stikuts, Ward 13 - elected
- Sara Ehrhardt, Ward 14 - elected
- Nate Erskine-Smith, Ward 19 - elected
- Kevin Rupasinghe, Ward 20 - 2nd place
- Krissan Veerasingam, Ward 21 -2nd place
- Jamaal Myers, Ward 23 - 2nd place
- Neethan Shan, Ward 25 - elected

=== IntegrityTO ===
- Daniel Di Giorgio, Ward 5 - 2nd place
- Marco Martins, Ward 9 - 2nd place
- Daniel Tate, Ward 13 - 3rd place
- Caryma Sa'd, Ward 14- 6th place

== Toronto District School Board elections ==
The Ontario government passed legislation in May 2026 which reduced the number of Toronto District School Board (TDSB) wards to 12 from 22. Having placed the board under supervision in June 2025, the Ford government confirmed shortly before the election that TDSB trustees would only be sworn in after the provincially-appointed supervisor relinquishes control of the board.

=== Ward 1 (Etobicoke North & Humber River-Black Creek) ===
Incumbent trustees Dennis Hastings (Etobicoke North) and Matias de Dovitiis (Humber River—Black Creek) registered to run for re-election.

Registered candidates

- Rosemarie Bryan
- Antonius Clarke
- Matias de Dovitiis, incumbent, endorsed by Toronto & York Region Labour Council and Progress Toronto
- Dennis Hastings, incumbent
- Amberley Ryan Henry
- Lakhan Kang

Withdrawn

- Maria Dias (withdrew July 26)
- Rajinder Lall (withdrew July 22)

Results

Candidate	Votes	%
Matias de Dovitiis (X)	11,538	31.96
Rosemarie Bryan	8,953	24.80
Lakhan Kang	6,455	17.88
Dennis Hastings (X)	3,687	10.21
Antonius Clarke	3,539	9.80
Amberley Ryan Henry	1,931	5.35

=== Ward 2 (Etobicoke Centre & Etobicoke Lakeshore) ===
Incumbent trustees Dan MacLean (Etobicoke Centre) and Patrick Nunziata (Etobicoke—Lakeshore) did not register to run for re-election.

Registered candidates

- Timothy Ellis, endorsed by Toronto & York Region Labour Council and Progress Toronto
- Ivan Voitsytskyi
- Matthew Zaffino

Results

Candidate	Votes	%
Timothy Ellis	29,057	47.69
Matthew Zaffino	23,101	37.91
Ivan Voitsytskyi	8,772	14.40

=== Ward 3 (Parkdale-High Park & Davenport) ===
Incumbent trustee Alexis Dawson (Davenport & Spadina—Fort York) registered to run for re-election. Incumbent trustee Debbie King (Parkdale—High Park) registered to run for election to Toronto City Council.

Registered candidates

- Matt Banninga
- Daniel Choi
- Alexis Dawson, incumbent, endorsed by Toronto & York Region Labour Council and Progress Toronto
- Christina Gural
- Justin Mensah
- Andrew Waters
- Jennifer Webster

Withdrawn

- Sarah Smithies (withdrew July 31)

Results

Candidate	Votes	%
Alexis Dawson (X)	27,069	43.72
Jennifer Webster	8,734	14.11
Andrew Waters	8,316	13.43
Daniel Choi	6,170	9.96
Christina Gural	5,971	9.64
Fatin Ishraq	2,802	4.53
Matt Banninga	1,833	2.96
Justin Mensah	1,024	1.65

=== Ward 4 (York Centre & Willowdale) ===
Incumbent trustee Alexandra Lulka Rotman (York Centre) did not register to run for re-election. Incumbent trustee Weidong Pei (Willowdale) registered to run for re-election.

Registered candidates

- Ivanna Andrusyak
- Brandon Choi, endorsed by Toronto & York Region Labour Council.
- Anthony Delpero
- Weidong Pei, incumbent (Willowdale), sought the Conservative nomination in Willowdale in the 2025 federal election

Withdrawn

- Oren Chervinsky (withdrew August 20)

Results

Candidate	Votes	%
Brandon Choi	20,925	42.75
Weidong Pei (X)	13,396	27.37
Ivanna Andrusyak	7,348	15.01
Anthony Delpero	7,281	14.87

=== Ward 5 (Spadina—Fort York & Toronto—Danforth) ===
Incumbent trustee Alexis Dawson (Davenport & Spadina—Fort York) is running in Ward 3. Incumbent Sara Ehrhardt (Toronto—Danforth) is running for Toronto City Council.

Registered candidates

- Elina Feyginberg
- Andrene Gregory
- David Gulyas
- Jared Kolb
- Maureen Larkin
- Andrew Massey
- Gus Stefanis
- Janine Viret
- Jennifer Volk, endorsed by Toronto & York Region Labour Council and Progress Toronto

Results

Candidate	Votes	%
Jennifer Volk	28,535	41.26
Andrew Massey	9,051	13.09
Maureen Larkin	8,346	12.07
Elina Feyginberg	6,443	9.32
Gus Stefanis	4,757	6.88
Andrene Gregory	4,744	6.86
Jared Kolb	3,496	5.06
Janine Viret	1,995	2.88
David Gulyas	1,791	2.59

=== Ward 6 (York South—Weston & Eglinton—Lawrence) ===
Incumbent trustees Liban Hassan (York South—Weston) and Shelley Laskin (Eglinton—Lawrence) did not register to run for re-election.

Registered candidates

- Stacey Cline, incumbent (Don Valley West)
- Saherla Osman
- Sarah Smithies
- John Vassal

Results

Candidate	Votes	%
Stacey Cline (X)	31,715	57.42
Sarah Smithies	9,945	18.00
Saherla Osman	7,745	14.02
John Vassal	5,832	10.56

=== Ward 7 (Toronto-St. Paul's, University-Rosedale, and Toronto Centre) ===
Incumbent trustee Deborah Williams registered to run for re-election.

Registered candidates

- Axel Arvizu
- Gladstone Cherrington
- Adam Golding, 7th place city council candidate in University—Rosedale in 2022, won 118 votes in University—Rosedale in the 2025 federal election
- Tasha Kheiriddin, conservative policy analyst, author, and broadcaster, endorsed by John Tory, George Smitherman, and Linda Frum
- Nasir Mohammad
- Shaffni Nalir
- Theo Nazary
- Deborah Williams, incumbent, endorsed by Toronto & York Region Labour Council, Chris Moise, and Progress Toronto

Withdrawn

- Elina Feyginberg (withdrew July 3)

Results

Candidate	Votes	%
Deborah Williams (X)	39,410	40.61
Tasha Kheiriddin	21,822	22.49
Adam Golding	15,893	16.38
Nasir Mohammad	6,320	6.51
Gladstone Cherrington	4,842	4.99
Shaffni Nalir	3,665	3.78
Axel Arvizu	2,892	2.98
Theo Nazary	2,203	2.27

=== Ward 8 (Don Valley West and Don Valley East) ===
Incumbent trustee Stacey Cline (Don Valley West) is running in Ward 6. Incumbent trustee Farzana Rajwani (Don Valley East) registered to run for re-election.

Registered candidates

- Tracey Haddleton
- Ibrahim Hatia
- Spiros Kapoglis
- Imran Khan
- Dewitt Lee III
- Christine McGirr
- Farzana Rajwani, incumbent, endorsed by Toronto & York Region Labour Council.

Results

Candidate	Votes	%
Farzana Rajwani (X)	13,726	29.03
Tracey Haddleton	11,637	24.61
Christine McGirr	8,970	18.97
Spiros Kapoglis	4,169	8.82
Imran Khan	3,351	7.09
Ibrahim Hatia	2,860	6.05
Dewitt Lee III	2,565	5.43

=== Ward 9 (Don Valley North & Scarborough—Agincourt) ===
Incumbent trustees James Li (Don Valley North) and Manna Wong (Scarborough—Agincourt) did not register to run for re-election.

Registered candidates

- Carey De Pass
- Christopher Mammoliti, former TDSB vice-chair (2020–2022) and former trustee for Humber River—Black Creek (2018–2022), endorsed by Toronto & York Region Labour Council.
- Bill Wu
- Sonny Yeung

Results

Candidate	Votes	%
Christopher Mammoliti	16,595	36.98
Bill Wu	13,077	29.14
Sonny Yeung	7,989	17.80
Carey De Pass	7,217	16.08

=== Ward 10 (Beaches-East York & Scarborough Southwest) ===
Incumbent trustee Michelle Aarts (Beaches-East York) registered to run for re-election but subsequently withdrew. Incumbent trustee Malika Ghous (Scarborough Southwest) did not register to run for re-election.

Registered candidates

- Malik Ahmad
- Azim Dewan
- Karen Emerson, endorsed by Progress Toronto
- Ahnaaf Hassan
- Md Sazibul Islam
- Glenn Kremp
- Shawn Li
- Jocelyne Poirier, Conservative candidate for Beaches—East York in the 2025 federal election
- Marisa Sterling

Withdrawn

- Michelle Aarts, incumbent (withdrew August 20)

Results

Candidate	Votes	%
Karen Emerson	18,382	30.36
Marisa Sterling	15,341	25.34
Jocelyne Poirier	10,205	16.86
Malik Ahmad	4,145	6.85
Ahnaaf Hassan	3,970	6.56
Shawn Li	3,721	6.15
Glenn Kremp	2,415	3.99
Md Sazibul Islam	1,315	2.17
Azim Dewan	1,047	1.73

=== Ward 11 (Scarborough Centre & Scarborough North) ===
Incumbent trustee Yalini Rajakulasingam (Scarborough North) did not register to run for re-election. The trustee seat for Scarborough Centre has been vacant since October 4, 2025, when incumbent Neethan Shan was elected to Toronto City Council.

Registered candidates

- Dedan Deus
- Angus Grant
- Dameon Halstead
- Curtis Jack
- Abdul Azeem Mohammed
- Ravicha Ravinthiran

Results

Candidate	Votes	%
Ravicha Ravinthiran	11,770	27.35
Curtis Jack	10,101	23.47
Angus Grant	9,407	21.86
Abdul Azeem Mohammed	7,412	17.22
Dameon Halstead	2,757	6.41
Dedan Deus	1,586	3.69

=== Ward 12 (Scarborough-Guildwood & Scarborough-Rouge Park) ===
Incumbent trustee Anu Sriskandarajah (Scarborough—Rouge Park) registered to run for re-election. Incumbent trustee Zakir Patel (Scarborough—Guildwood) registered to run for election to Toronto City Council.

Registered candidates

- Safiya Ansari
- Darren Frake
- Aria Garcia
- Gary McBean
- Vimuththan Nantheeswarar
- Ketan Purohit
- Anu Sriskandarajah, incumbent
- Sherri Williams
- Marcia Wilson

Results

Candidate	Votes	%
Anu Sriskandarajah (X)	13,049	27.49
Safiya Ansari	7,651	16.12
Gary McBean	5,477	11.54
Sherri Williams	5,370	11.31
Marcia Wilson	4,640	9.77
Aria Garcia	3,674	7.74
Vimuththan Nantheeswarar	2,863	6.03
Ketan Purohit	2,460	5.18
Darren Frake	2,288	4.82

== Toronto Catholic District School Board elections ==
Having placed the Toronto Catholic District School Board (TCDSB) under supervision in June 2025, the Ford government confirmed shortly before the election that TCDSB trustees would not be sworn in on the usual timeline, with the first meeting to be scheduled by either the provincially-appointed supervisor or the education minister (currently Paul Calandra) on an unknown date. Trustees will only have power over denominational issues until the supervisor relinquishes control.

=== Ward 1 Etobicoke ===
Incumbent trustee Joseph Martino did not register to run for re-election.

Registered candidates

- Jennifer Di Francesco
- Maria Dias
- Robert Pella
- Denys Petika

Results

Candidate	Votes	%
Robert Pella	2,855	45.20
Jennifer Di Francesco	2,547	40.32
Maria Dias	915	14.48

=== Ward 2 Etobicoke ===
Incumbent trustee Markus de Domenico registered to run for re-election.

Registered candidates

- Sara Concordia
- Markus de Domenico

Results

Candidate	Votes	%
Markus de Domenico (X)	8,272	56.01
Sara Concordia	6,498	43.99

=== Ward 3 North York ===
Incumbent trustee Ida Li Preti registered to run for re-election.

Registered candidates

- Ida Li Preti, incumbent
- Susel Munoz Plasencia

Results

Candidate	Votes	%
Ida Li Preti (X)	5,458	80.43
Susel Munoz Plasencia	1,328	19.57

=== Ward 4 Parkdale—High Park and Etobicoke—Lakeshore ===
Incumbent trustee Teresa Lubinski registered to run for re-election.

Registered candidates

- Peter Fracassi
- Teresa Lubinski, incumbent
- Maria Borreca

Results

Candidate	Votes	%
Teresa Lubinski (X)	8,629	56.82
Maria Borreca	4,396	28.95
Peter Fracassi	2,162	14.24

=== Ward 5 North York ===
Incumbent trustee Maria Rizzo registered to run for re-election.

Registered candidates

- Gianfranco Cristiano
- Maria Rizzo, incumbent

Results

Candidate	Votes	%
Maria Rizzo (X)	8,409	50.74
Gianfranco Cristiano	8,163	49.26

=== Ward 6 York ===
Incumbent trustee Frank D'Amico registered to run for re-election.

Registered candidates

- Frank D'Amico, incumbent

Results

Candidate	Result
Frank D'Amico (X)	Acclaimed

=== Ward 7 Scarborough—Agincourt ===
Incumbent trustee Mike Del Grande did not register to run for re-election.

Registered candidates

- Celine DiNova
- Marissa Largo
- Gregory Rodriguez

Results

Candidate	Votes	%
Marissa Largo	3,587	38.63
Celine DiNova	3,056	32.91
Gregory Rodriguez	2,643	28.46

=== Ward 8 Scarborough ===
Incumbent trustee Garry Tanuan registered to run for re-election.

Registered candidates

- Carla Allen
- Mary Cury Paul
- Garry Tanuan, incumbent

Withdrawn

- Dominic Cava (withdrew August 13)

Results

Candidate	Votes	%
Garry Tanuan (X)	4,759	45.44
Carla Allen	3,344	31.93
Mary Cury Paul	2,370	22.63

=== Ward 9 Toronto ===
Incumbent trustee Kevin Morrison is not running for re-election and is running for Toronto City Council in Ward 19 instead.

Registered candidates

- Rosina Bonavota
- Renato Fallico
- David Le
- Jonathan Santos

Results

Candidate	Votes	%
Jonathan Santos	4,148	38.63
Rosina Bonavota	3,793	35.33
David Le	1,653	15.40
Renato Fallico	1,143	10.65

=== Ward 10 Toronto ===
Incumbent trustee Daniel Di Giorgio is not running for re-election and is running for Toronto City Council in Ward 5 instead

Registered candidates

- Rosanna Araujo
- Teresa Colonna
- Stephanie Loor Ruiz
- Sal Piccininni
- Paul Salvatori

Results

Candidate	Votes	%
Teresa Colonna	3,210	31.15
Sal Piccininni	3,184	30.90
Rosanna Araujo	2,082	20.21
Paul Salvatori	1,027	9.97
Stephanie Loor Ruiz	801	7.77

=== Ward 11 East York and Toronto ===
Incumbent trustee Angela Kennedy registered to run for re-election.

Registered candidates

- Angela Kennedy, incumbent
- Anton Perera

Results

Candidate	Votes	%
Angela Kennedy (X)	11,759	74.62
Anton Perera	3,999	25.38

=== Ward 12 Scarborough ===
Incumbent trustee Nancy Crawford registered to run for re-election.

Registered candidates

- Nancy Crawford, incumbent

Results

Candidate	Result
Nancy Crawford (X)	Acclaimed
