= Toronto—Danforth =

Toronto—Danforth may refer to:

- Toronto—Danforth (federal electoral district), federal riding in Toronto, Ontario, Canada
- Toronto—Danforth (provincial electoral district), provincial riding in Toronto, Ontario, Canada
- Ward 14 Toronto—Danforth, municipal ward in Toronto, Ontario, Canada
