= Discovery District =

Coordinates: 43.658°N 79.388°W

- Neighbourhood
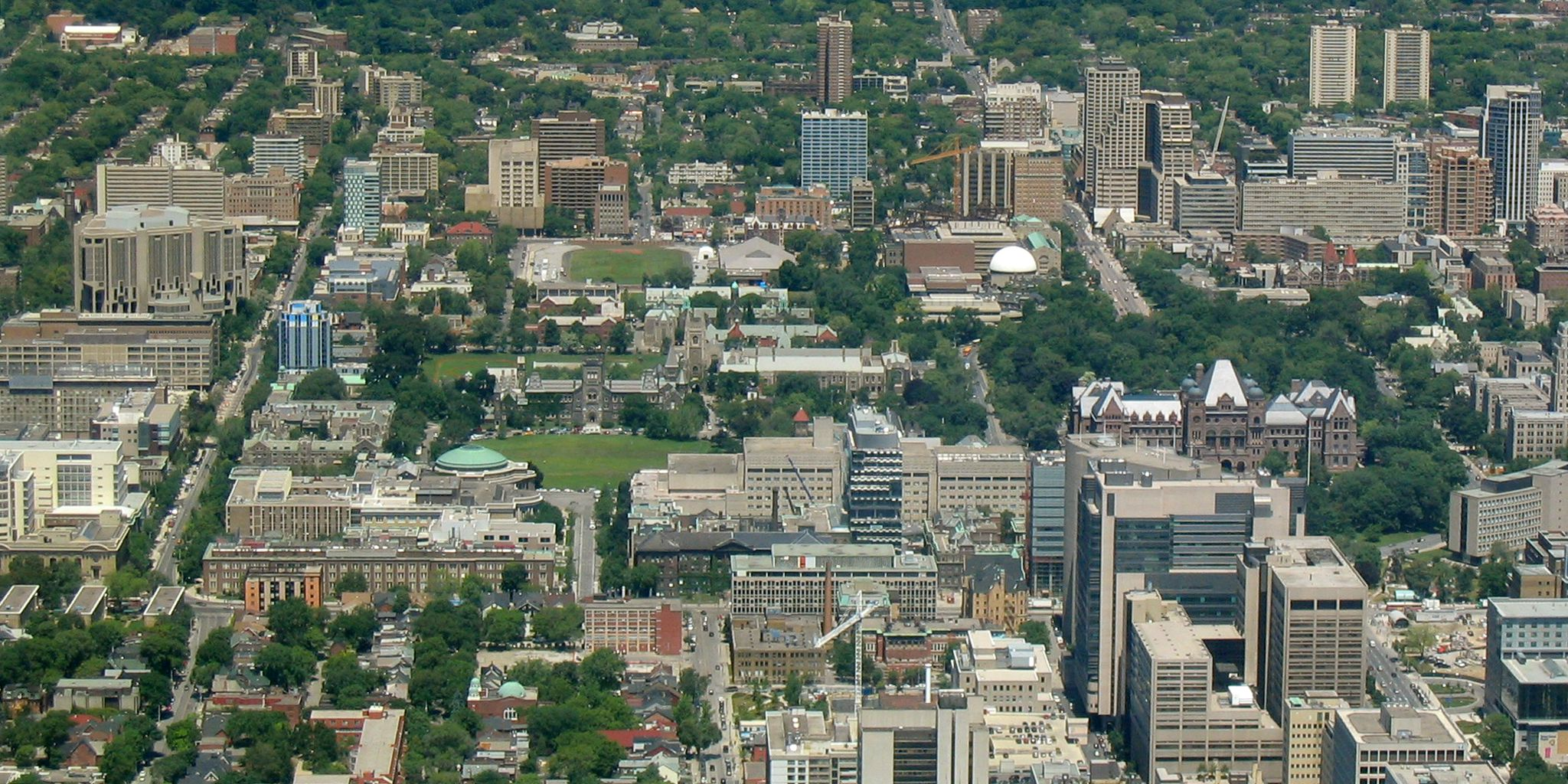
- Discovery District comprising the vicinity of the University of Toronto St. George campus and its research hospitals, visible from the CN Tower

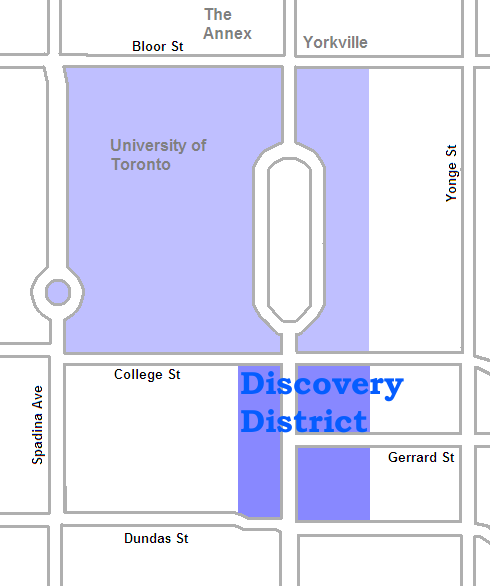
- The area on University Avenue is the core of the Discovery District. The campus of the University of Toronto to the north can also be included
- Country: Canada
- Province: Ontario
- City: Toronto

Government
  - MP: Danielle Martin (University-Rosedale)
  - MPP: Jessica Bell (politician) (University-Rosedale)
  - Councillor: Dianne Saxe (Ward 11 University—Rosedale)

The Discovery District is one of the commercial districts in Downtown Toronto, Ontario, Canada. It has a high concentration of hospitals and research institutions, particularly those related to biotechnology. The district is roughly bounded by Bloor Street on the north, Bay Street on the east, Dundas Street on the south, and Spadina Avenue on the west.

== Characteristics ==
The area includes the main campuses of the University of Toronto (St. George) and Toronto Metropolitan University, as well as university affiliated health-care research hospitals including the Hospital for Sick Children, Toronto General Hospital, Princess Margaret Cancer Centre, Mount Sinai Hospital, Toronto Rehabilitation Institute Women's College Hospital, and the MaRS Discovery District. These institutions are concentrated near the intersection of University Avenue and College Streets but the District generally extends north to Bloor Street, south to Dundas Street, east to Bay Street and West to Spadina Avenue. A number of key organizations within the Ontario life sciences community are also located here including Ontario Genomics, Ontario Bioscience Innovation Organization (OBIO), Toronto Innovation Acceleration Partners (TIAP) and JLabs Toronto.

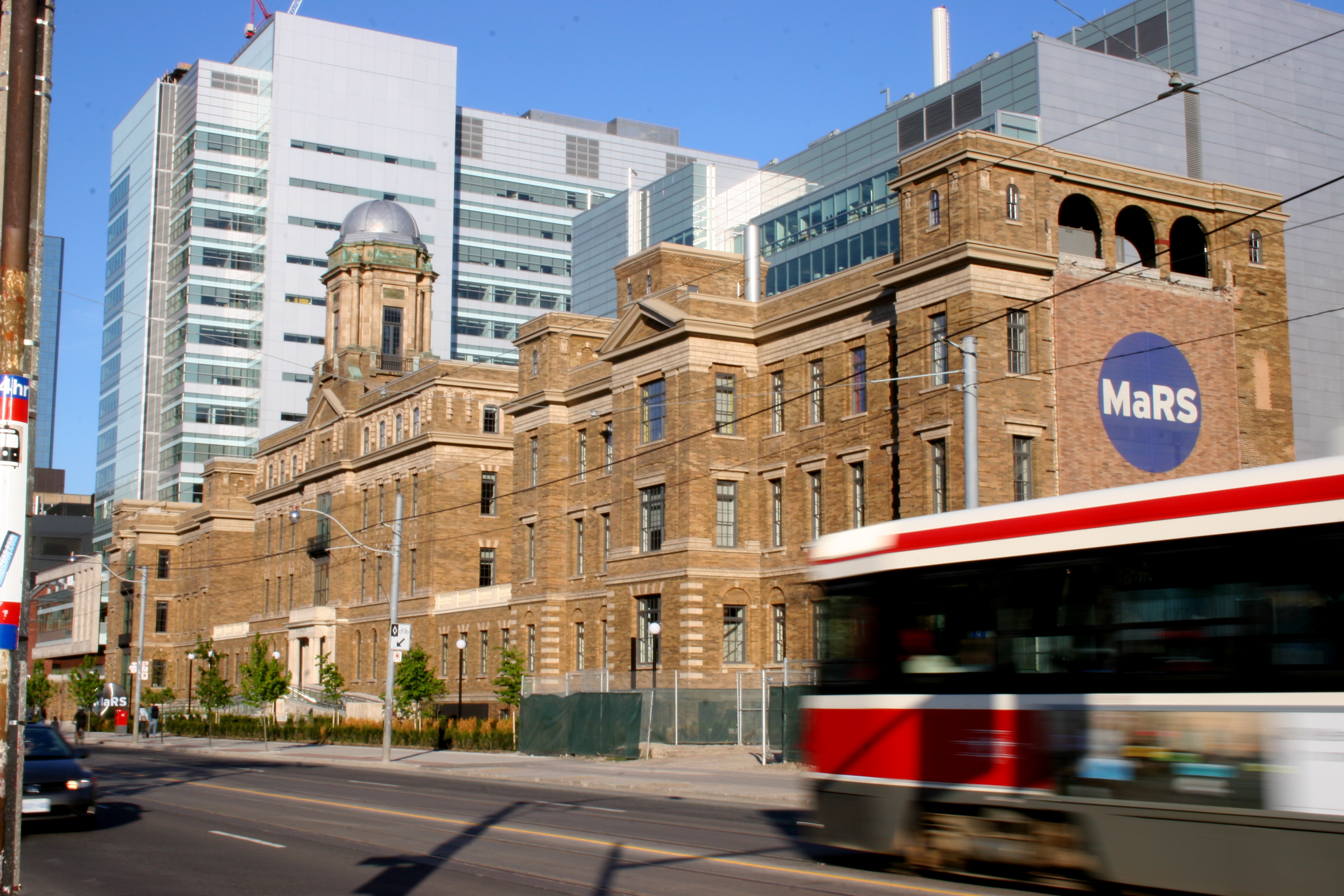
MaRS Discovery District is also home to several research institutes and life sciences organizations including the Centre for Commercialization of Regenerative Medicine (CCRM) and artificial intelligence companies including the Vector Institute and Deep Genomics.

History: this area was subdivided from three main 'park lot' estates: Macaulay Estate (to the east, became a residential district known as 'the Ward' until demolished), Elmsley Estate (redivided with the Macaulay Estate which was concentrated to the south. Elmsley estate is closely tied with the history of both the University of Toronto and the commercial district on Yonge Street) and the Powell Estate (became the 'University Park' now the University of Toronto)

A short stretch of Gerrard Street West from Bay Street to LaPlante Avenue was referred to as Gerrard Village, a Bohemian Greenwich Village like area from the late 19th century to the early 1970s.

This area is referred to by Statistics Canada as census tract 5350035.00. According to the 2011 National Household Survey, 80% of the population surveyed reported an income of over $50 000 annually. This is almost 30% higher than the average provincial income. For the total 2011 population within the discovery district 395 people made between $30 000 and $39 000 annually, 410 made between $40 000 and $49 000, and 2250 made over $50 000. The accuracy of these figures is questionable due to the National Household Survey being optional, and therefore wealthier people could possibly be over represented. But considering the location in the heart of downtown Toronto and the rapid expansion of condominium build ups, people would have to make more money to live here.

Statistics Canada. National Household Survey 2011

== History ==
The original plans for the Town of York (later City of Toronto) divided the City along Lot Street (Queen Street) with a street grid creating small urban 'town lots' to the south and large rectangular 'park lots' (farms) to the north. The 'park lots' along Lot St (Queen) were given to many of York's (Toronto's) most prominent families who had professions and sometimes even a separate house in the Town and generally did not farm; therefore they often did not clear their lots of the natural forest. As each 'park lot' extended in a rectangle from Lot Street (Queen) to what would become Bloor, most of the estate houses were built on the north side of Lot Street opposite the Town. Four 'park lots' (numbers 9 to 12) comprised the area north of Queen just across from the heart of Toronto between Yonge Street and just west of College Avenue (now University Ave). Three of the families occupying these lots built large estate homes all fairly far north of Lot St (Queen):

- Caer Howell (built for the Welsh Loyalist Chief Justice of Upper Canada; William Dummer Powell, later demolished) on College Avenue (now University Avenue). This lot became the 'University Park' (now University of Toronto).
- Elmsley Villa (built for another of Upper Canada's Chief Justices and Speaker of the Legislative Assembly; John Elmsley. Was Government House for the short time Toronto was the United Canada's capital) this family famously converted to Catholicism and founded St. Michael's College on their former 'park lot'.
- Teraulay Cottage (named after the owner Mr. & Mrs. Macauley née Hayter who had served as surgeon with Simcoe's Queen's Rangers) later subdivided the estate with a square in the centre onto which fronted Terauley Cottage and Little Trinity Anglican Church (still standing) built on land donated by the family. This first Toronto residential neighbourhood north of Lot (Queen) was originally called 'Macauleytown' later 'the Ward'.

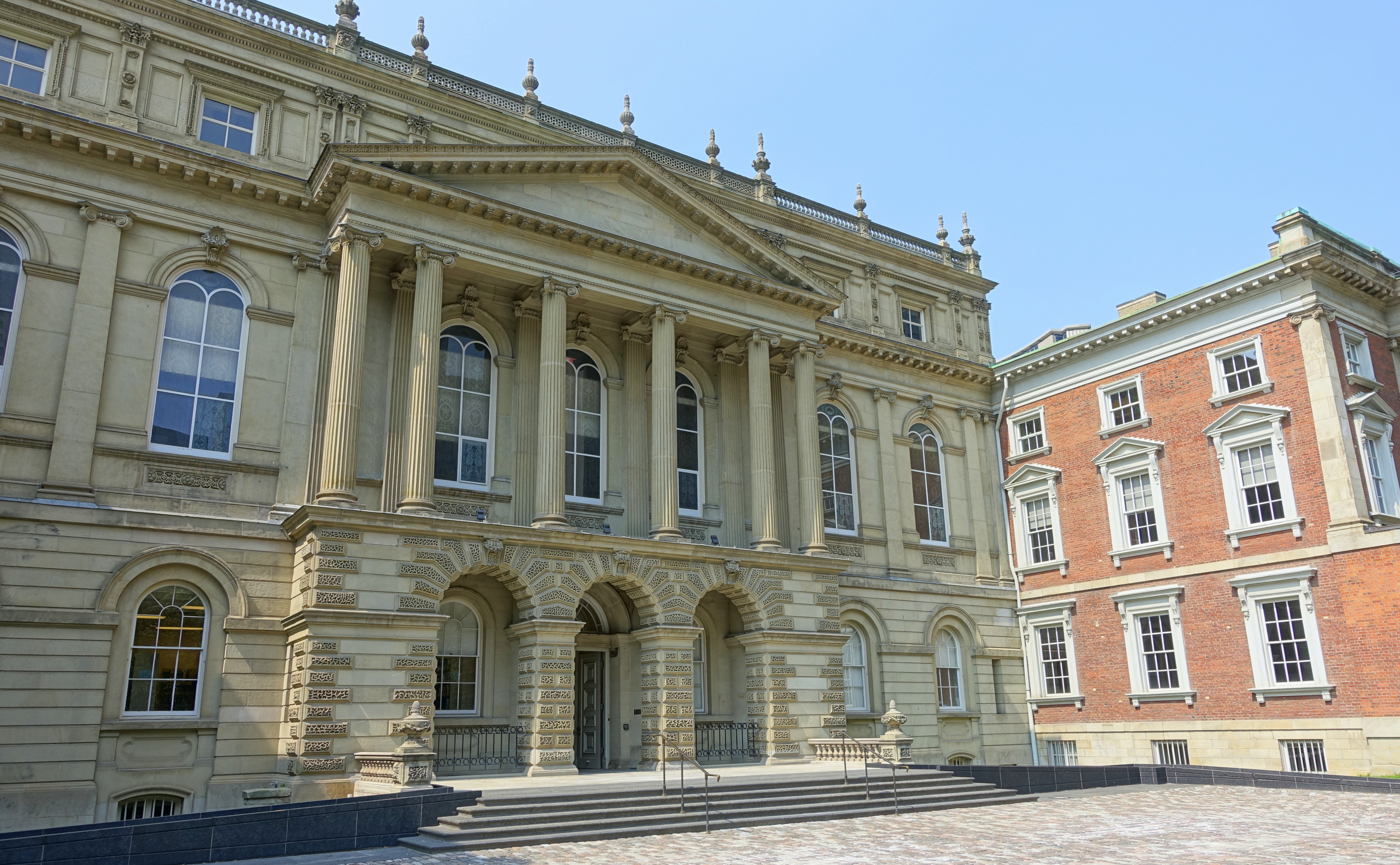
Osgoode Hall was completed in 1834, and presently houses the Law Society of Ontario.

The situation of these lots just north of the town meant that this land was in high demand as the city outgrew its original boundaries south of Lot (Queen). As most Toronto streets started at Lot (Queen), the 'park lots' commanded impressive views into the town and many of the buildings that were built as the 'park lots' were subdivided by their owner, were impressive institutions such as Osgoode Hall (Upper Canada's Law Courts) still standing, built at the top of York Street by 1832 just two years before the Town of York became a City with the name Toronto. By the time Toronto became a city in 1834, the area south of Lot St (Queen) from the Garrison Creek to the Don River had all been subdivided and the four 'park lots' north of Lot St (Queen) were subdivided by their owners with the eastern lot (Macaulay's estate) becoming the first residential district north of Queen, the western lot (Powell's estate) becoming the 'University Park', gated parkland intended to become Toronto's University and the area between on the north side of Lot St (Queen) attracting various institutions and businesses.

=== Development ===
The area just north of Lot St (Queen) became something of an institutional area with buildings such as the House of Industry (still standing), the Armoury (behind Osgoode Hall, now demolished for the University Avenue Court Houses) and the Eaton's Company store to the south (creating 'the cavern' with the Hudson Bay building on the south of Queen St) and the University of Toronto in the 'University Park' to the north which was gated at Queen St & College Ave (University Ave) and was largely forested.

It was also part of the City Liberties identified in James Cane's 1842 map. It was bounded roughly by Bloor, Don River, Dundas and Bathurst.

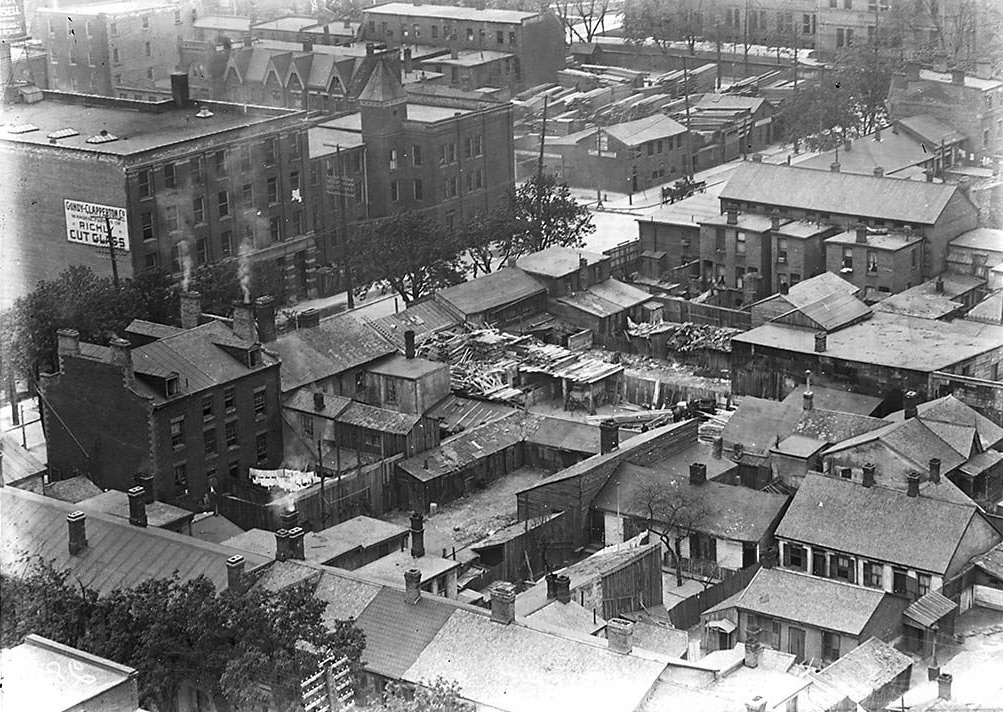
In the early 1900s, The Ward, an economically depressed neighbourhood was demolished.

By about 1900 there still remained a large residential district called 'The Ward' which became Toronto's first Chinatown but also attracted many attempts to have it demolished as it was economically depressed. At this time some of Toronto's oldest and most important institutions south of Queen were replaced with larger buildings north of Queen St such as Old City Hall (called 'New' City Hall at this time) at the top of Bay Street and the Ontario Parliament Building; Queen's Park on the university grounds at the top of College Avenue (renamed University Ave).

Part of 'The Ward' had been demolished for the building of New City Hall (Now Old City Hall) and in the years after the first world war, several plans were made to more closely link the institutional area north of Queen with the older town to the south. Two plans in particular substantially changed this area although both ultimately collapsed with the Great Depression. University Avenue was extended south of Queen street although the street itself, formerly a large quiet street leading to Queen's Park and the 'University Park' was only slowly turned into the bustling Boulevard of towers and hospitals it is today, none of the Art Deco towers originally planned for the street were ever built. The second plan called for a new 'Federal Avenue' in the middle of the old town's grid (between Bay and York Streets) starting from the new Union Station north to a proposed Government complex on the north side of Queen. Many buildings in 'The Ward' were purchased by the government before the plan fell through. In the 1960s with the City of Toronto annexing the last independent municipalities, 'The Ward' was demolished and a new City Hall was built on the north side of Queen Street between what became Old City Hall and Osgoode Hall.
