= Obasogie =

- Gender: Male
- Language: Edo

Origin
- Origin: Nigerian
- Region of origin: South South, Nigeria

Obasogie is a Nigerian surname. It is a male name and of Benin origin.

== Notable individuals with the name ==
- Godwin Obasogie (born 1954), Nigerian Olympian hurdler
- Nekpen Obasogie, Nigerian writer
- Osagie Obasogie (born 1977), Nigerian-American bioethicist
- Amas Obasogie (born 1999) Nigerian footballer
