= Sara Ehrhardt =

Canadian politician

Toronto City Councillor for Ward 14 Toronto—Danforth
- Incumbent
- Assumed office November 15, 2026
- Preceded by: Paula Fletcher

Sara Ehrhardt is a Canadian politician who was elected to represent Ward 14 Toronto—Danforth on Toronto City Council in the 2026 municipal election.

== Background and community work ==
Ehrhardt worked in public policy and has a background in engineering. Her involvement in local advocacy began with a campaign to prevent the closure of the swimming pool at Duke of Connaught Junior and Senior Public School. She subsequently helped expand swimming programs in Toronto's east end and advocated for childcare funding.

== Political career ==
Ehrhardt was elected as the Toronto District School Board trustee for Toronto-Danforth in 2022. She served as a trustee before running for city council in 2026.

She entered the council race in August 2026 after Paula Fletcher announced that she would not seek re-election. Ehrhardt received endorsements from Fletcher, Mike Layton, Peter Tabuns and Progress Toronto.

Ehrhardt finished first among 18 candidates, receiving 22,440 votes, or 48.78 per cent of the vote. Former councillor Mary Fragedakis placed second, followed by Dianne Saxe, who had represented Ward 11 University—Rosedale before contesting Toronto-Danforth.

== Electoral record ==
Year	Position	Votes	%	Result	Main opponents
2026	Councillor, Ward 14 Toronto—Danforth	22,440	48.78	Elected	Mary Fragedakis (10,425 – 22.66%); Dianne Saxe (3,857 – 8.38%)

Source: Beach Metro Community News.
