= University—Rosedale =

University—Rosedale is the name of three electoral districts in Downtown Toronto, Ontario, Canada, with identical boundaries, used to elect legislators at different levels of government.

- University—Rosedale (federal electoral district), federal riding electing one MP to the House of Commons of Canada
- University—Rosedale (provincial electoral district), provincial riding electing one MPP to the Legislative Assembly of Ontario]
- Ward 11 University—Rosedale, municipal ward electing one member of the Toronto City Council
