= Rebecca Saxe =

American cognitive neuroscientist

Rebecca Saxe is a professor of cognitive neuroscience and associate Dean of Science at MIT. She is an associate member of the McGovern Institute for Brain Research and a board member of the Center for Open Science. She is known for her research on the neural basis of social cognition. She received her BA from Oxford University where she studied Psychology and Philosophy, and her PhD from MIT in Cognitive Science. She is the granddaughter of Canadian coroner and Ontario provincial legislator Morton Shulman, and daughter of Toronto city councillor Dianne Saxe.

== Scientific contributions ==
As a graduate student, Saxe demonstrated that a brain region known as the right temporoparietal junction (rTPJ) is specifically activated by ‘theory of mind’ tasks that require understanding the mental states of other people. She continues to study this brain region, and has recently demonstrated that rTPJ is involved in moral judgments; in a task where subjects hear stories and evaluate the permissibility of the characters’ behavior, disruption of the rTPJ causes subjects to place less weight on the character's intentions, and greater weight on the actual outcomes of their actions. Individuals with autism show a similar pattern of responses, suggesting a possible role for rTPJ in the etiology of autism.

In addition to her work on theory of mind, Saxe also studies the plasticity of the cortex and the neural substrates of empathy, group conflict and emotion attribution.

== Awards and recognition ==
Before joining the MIT faculty, Saxe was a junior fellow of Harvard University's Society of Fellows. In 2008, she was named one of Popular Science Magazine's “Brilliant 10” scientists under 40, and in 2012 the World Economic Forum named her a Young Global Leader. Her 2009 TED talk has been viewed more than 3.3 million times. Saxe was awarded the Troland Research Award by the National Academy of Sciences in 2014.
