= Mary Fragedakis =

Canadian politician

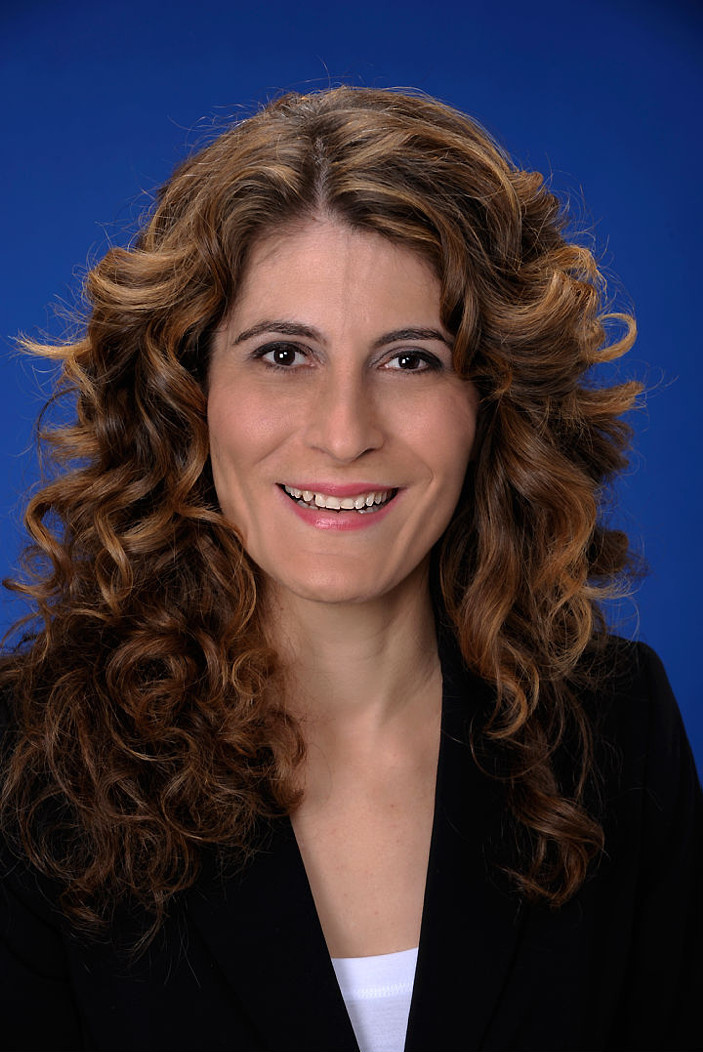
- Fragedakis in 2010

Toronto city councillor for Ward 29 Toronto—Danforth
- In office December 1, 2010 – December 1, 2018
- Preceded by: Case Ootes
- Succeeded by: Ward dissolved

Personal details
- Born: April 22, 1971 (age 55) Toronto, Ontario, Canada
- Party: Ontario Liberal
- Other political affiliations: New Democratic (2003–2010)
- Education: University of Toronto (MA)

Mary Fragedakis (/ˌfræɡəˈdækɪs/ FRAG-ə-DAK-iss; born April 22, 1971) is a Canadian politician who served as the Toronto city councillor for Ward 29 Toronto—Danforth from 2010 to 2018. She was the Ontario Liberal Party candidate for Toronto—Danforth in the 2022 Ontario general election. In the 2026 Toronto municipal election, she ran for Ward 14 Toronto—Danforth and finished second to Sara Ehrhardt.

== Early life and education ==
Fragedakis is the daughter of Greek immigrants and grew up in the Danforth community. She attended Wilkinson Public School, Earl Grey Senior Public School and Riverdale Collegiate Institute. She graduated from the University of Toronto in 1996 with a Master of Arts in political science.

Prior to her election to city council, Fragedakis was involved for nine years with Open Dialogue, a conference and seminar organizing company. She was also one of the founders of the Broadview Community Youth Group.

== Political career ==
=== Toronto City Council ===
==== 2010 election ====
Fragedakis was encouraged to run for city council by former councillor and federal New Democratic Party (NDP) leader Jack Layton. She contested Ward 29 Toronto—Danforth in the 2010 Toronto municipal election to succeed retiring councillor Case Ootes. She defeated Ootes's preferred candidate, former councillor Jane Pitfield, receiving 41.8 per cent of the vote to Pitfield's 27.9 per cent.

==== 2014 election ====
Fragedakis was re-elected in the 2014 Toronto municipal election, receiving 59.3 per cent of the vote.

==== Toronto Transit Commission ====
Toronto City Council appointed Fragedakis to the Toronto Transit Commission (TTC) board in late 2016.

In 2017, she moved a motion to find $1.2 million for a subway reliability program that TTC chief executive officer Andy Byford said could reduce track-related subway delays by up to 30 per cent. During the city's 2018 budget process, she called for additional TTC funding to address overcrowding.

Along with mayor John Tory and TTC chair Josh Colle, Fragedakis advocated for the introduction of a two-hour transfer policy for TTC passengers using Presto.

During her time on council, Fragedakis also served on the city's economic and community development committee.

==== 2018 election ====
Ahead of the 2018 Toronto municipal election, the Ontario government reduced the size of Toronto City Council from 47 proposed wards to 25 wards corresponding to federal and provincial electoral districts. The change combined the former wards represented by Fragedakis and Paula Fletcher into the new Ward 14 Toronto—Danforth. The two incumbent councillors consequently ran against each other.

Fletcher won the election with 42.3 per cent of the vote, while Fragedakis finished second with 26.2 per cent.

=== Business improvement areas ===
In April 2019, Fragedakis became executive director of the GreekTown on the Danforth Business Improvement Area (BIA). She remained in the position for more than six years, until her services were terminated in 2025.

Fragedakis also worked as executive director of the CityPlace and Fort York BIA and the Lawrence Ingram Keele BIA.

In March 2026, Fragedakis sued the GreekTown on the Danforth BIA for $115,000, alleging that she had been wrongfully terminated and subjected to defamation and harassment. The BIA denied the allegations and maintained that Fragedakis had worked as an independent contractor through her company, Urbaniciti, and that her contract had been terminated with reasonable notice.

=== 2022 Ontario election ===
In January 2021, Fragedakis announced that she would seek the Ontario Liberal Party nomination in Toronto—Danforth for the 2022 Ontario general election. She was acclaimed as the party's candidate on March 17, 2021.

In the provincial election, Fragedakis finished second behind incumbent NDP MPP Peter Tabuns.

=== 2026 Toronto election ===
On August 21, 2026, Fragedakis registered as a candidate for Ward 14 Toronto—Danforth in the 2026 Toronto municipal election, seeking to return to city council eight years after her 2018 defeat. Her candidacy followed incumbent councillor Paula Fletcher's announcement that she would retire rather than seek another term.

Fragedakis said that her work with business improvement areas following her departure from council had given her additional experience with local economies and the implementation of municipal policy. She described herself as both progressive and practical and identified public transit, affordability, small-business pressures, downtown recovery and infrastructure as issues of particular interest.

Fragedakis finished second in the election with 10,425 votes (22.66 per cent), behind Sara Ehrhardt.

== Electoral history ==
2026 Toronto municipal election, Ward 14 Toronto—Danforth
| Candidate | Votes | Vote share |
|---|---|---|
| Sara Ehrhardt | 22,440 | 48.78% |
| Mary Fragedakis | 10,425 | 22.66% |
| Dianne Saxe | 3,857 | 8.38% |
| Susan Chapelle | 1,675 | 3.64% |
| Maria Voutsinas | 1,658 | 3.60% |
| Caryma Sa'd | 986 | 2.14% |
| Maqsood Ahmad | 847 | 1.84% |
| Denise Walcott | 651 | 1.42% |
| Peter De Marco | 594 | 1.29% |
| Michael Connor | 591 | 1.28% |
| Christiane Tetreault | 520 | 1.13% |
| George Fawcett | 433 | 0.94% |
| Michael Mitchell | 328 | 0.71% |
| John Kladitis | 287 | 0.62% |
| Jason Stevens | 268 | 0.58% |
| Devyn Stackhouse | 169 | 0.37% |
| Dennis Corcoran | 149 | 0.32% |
| Robb Dagenais | 128 | 0.28% |
Source: City of Toronto

2022 Ontario general election: Toronto—Danforth
| Party | Candidate | Votes | % | ±% | Expenditures |
|---|---|---|---|---|---|
| New Democratic | Peter Tabuns | 22,890 | 55.39 | −8.85 | $112,989 |
| Liberal | Mary Fragedakis | 9,240 | 22.36 | +8.29 | $77,403 |
| Progressive Conservative | Colleen McCleery | 5,556 | 13.44 | −2.41 | $18,446 |
| Green | Marcelo Levy | 2,513 | 6.08 | +1.70 | $4,531 |
| New Blue | Milton Kandias | 515 | 1.25 | | $9,594 |
| Ontario Party | George Simopoulos | 232 | 0.56 | | $0 |
| None of the Above | Christopher Brophy | 201 | 0.49 | | $0 |
| Communist | Jennifer Moxon | 177 | 0.43 | +0.10 | $0 |
| Total valid votes/expense limit | | 41,324 | 99.41 | +0.38 | $117,719 |
| Total rejected, unmarked, and declined ballots | | 244 | 0.59 | −0.38 | |
| Turnout | | 41,568 | 49.44 | −12.14 | |
| Eligible voters | | 83,888 | | | |
| New Democratic hold | | Swing | | −8.57 | |
Source(s): "Summary of Valid Votes Cast for Each Candidate" (PDF). Elections Ontario. 2022. Archived from the original on May 18, 2023.; "Statistical Summary by Electoral District" (PDF). Elections Ontario. 2022. Archived from the original on May 21, 2023.

2018 Toronto municipal election, Ward 14 Toronto—Danforth
| Candidate | Votes | Vote share |
| Paula Fletcher | 16,468 | 42.27% |
| Mary Fragedakis | 10,201 | 26.18% |
| Chris Budo | 7,394 | 18.98% |
| Lanrick Bennett | 1,935 | 4.97% |
| Dixon Chan | 1,100 | 2.82% |
| Chris Marinakis | 700 | 1.80% |
| Marisol D'Andrea | 429 | 1.10% |
| Ryan Lindsay | 413 | 1.06% |
| Lawrence Lychowyd | 188 | 0.48% |
| Alexander Pena | 131 | 0.34% |
| Total | 38,958 | 100% |
Source: City of Toronto

2014 Toronto election, Ward 29
| Candidate | Votes | % |
| Mary Fragedakis | 11,904 | 59.34% |
| Dave Andre | 4,950 | 24.68% |
| John Papadakis | 2,000 | 9.97% |
| Ricardo Francis | 528 | 2.63% |
| Jimmy Vlachos | 428 | 2.13% |
| Hank Martyn | 249 | 1.24% |
| Total | 20,059 | 100% |

2010 Toronto election, Ward 29
| Candidate | Votes | % |
| Mary Fragedakis | 7,430 | 41.81% |
| Jane Pitfield | 4,966 | 27.94% |
| Jennifer Wood | 4,269 | 24.02% |
| Chris Caldwell | 885 | 4.98% |
| John Richardson | 138 | 0.77% |
| Mike Restivo | 81 | 0.45% |
| Total | 17,769 | 100% |

Source: City of Toronto.
