= Dianne Saxe =

Canadian lawyer and politician

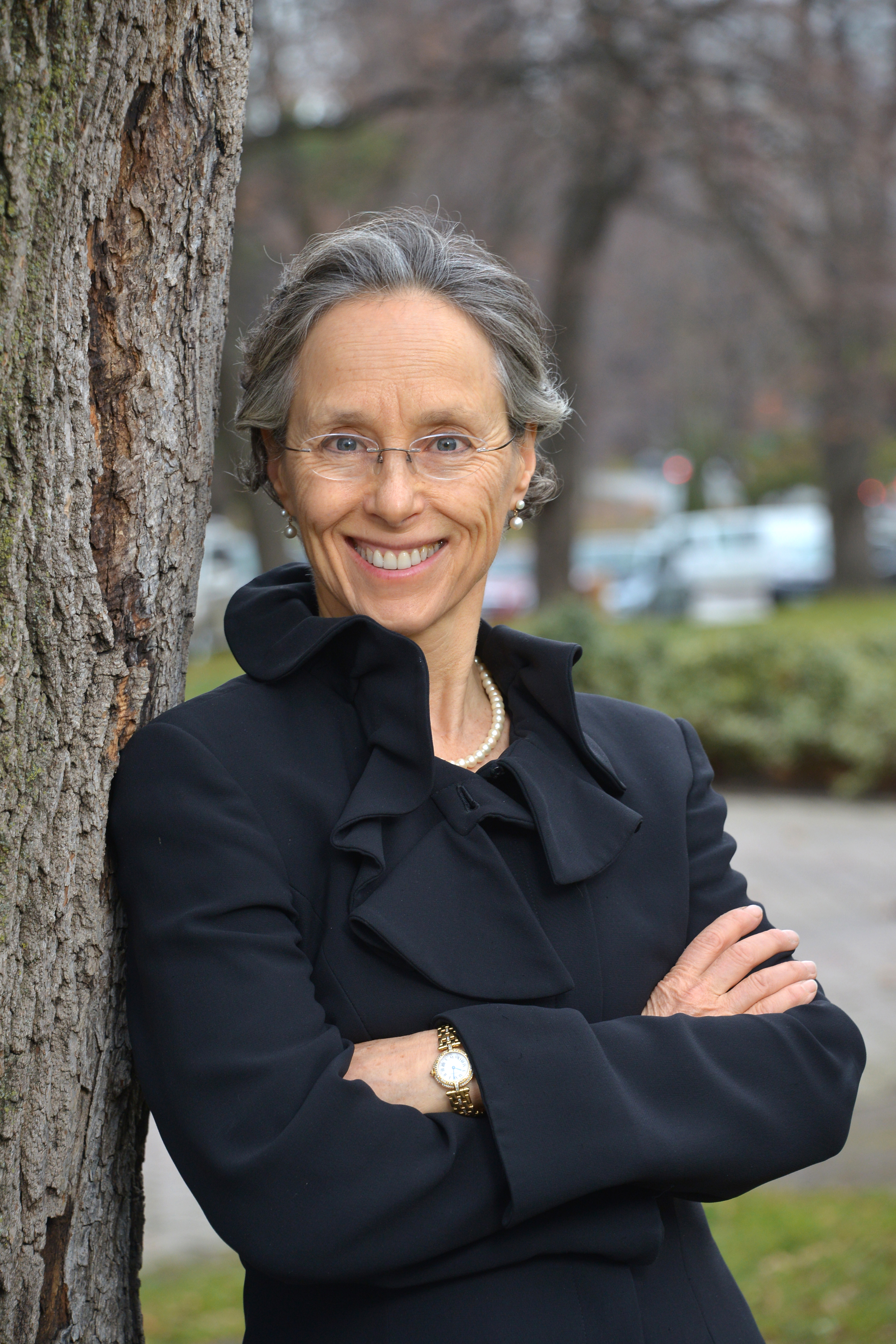

Toronto City Councillor for Ward 11 University—Rosedale
- In office November 15, 2022 – November 15, 2026
- Preceded by: Mike Layton
- Succeeded by: Mike Layton

Deputy Leader of the Green Party of Ontario
- In office November 16, 2020 – October 29, 2022
- Leader: Mike Schreiner
- Preceded by: Abhijeet Manay
- Succeeded by: Abhijeet Manay

3rd Environmental Commissioner of Ontario
- In office 2015–2019
- Premier: Kathleen Wynne; Doug Ford
- Preceded by: Ellen Schwartzel (interim)
- Succeeded by: Position abolished

Personal details
- Born: Dianne Marie Shulman; November 27, 1952 (age 73) Toronto, Ontario, Canada
- Party: Independent
- Other political affiliations: Ontario Green
- Spouse: Stewart Saxe (m. 1972; died 2014)
- Children: 2, including Rebecca
- Parents: Morton Shulman (father); Gloria Bossin (mother)
- Relatives: D. Geoffrey Shulman (brother)
- Education: Osgoode Hall (LL.B., Ph.D.)
- Website: diannesaxe.ca

Dianne Saxe (née Shulman; born November 27, 1952) is a Canadian lawyer and former municipal politician who represented Ward 11 University—Rosedale on Toronto City Council from 2022 to 2026. She was elected in the 2022 municipal election and left office on November 15, 2026. In August 2026, Saxe withdrew her candidacy for re-election in University—Rosedale and registered instead as a candidate in Ward 14 Toronto—Danforth in the 2026 Toronto municipal election, following the retirement of incumbent councillor Paula Fletcher. She finished third in Toronto—Danforth, behind Sara Ehrhardt and Mary Fragedakis.

Before entering municipal politics, Saxe practised environmental law and served as the third and last environmental commissioner of Ontario from 2015 to 2019. She was deputy leader of the Green Party of Ontario (GPO) from 2020 to 2022.

== Legal career ==
=== Education ===
Saxe studied law at Osgoode Hall Law School, earning a Bachelor of Laws (LL.B.) degree in 1974. She was called to the bar of Ontario in 1976 and earned a Ph.D. in law from Osgoode in 1991.

=== Career ===
Prior to entering the government sector, Saxe worked in private practice with two major law firms and then ran an environmental law boutique firm for 25 years. Her early career focused on the intersection of environmental law and corporate liability, while her more recent practice has centred on climate change and related law. She has published widely on environmental issues. From 1975 to 1989, Saxe practiced law with the Government of Ontario.

In 1991, Saxe moved into private practice. She represented the Association of Municipalities of Ontario (AMO) in their successful $115 million claim against Stewardship Ontario for the cost of Ontario's Blue Box program in 2014.

=== Environmental Commissioner of Ontario ===
Saxe was appointed the environmental commissioner of Ontario in 2015 by the Legislative Assembly of Ontario. The commissioner was an independent officer of the legislature which monitored the Environmental Bill of Rights, and submitted annual reports on the province's progress on each of energy conservation, environmental protection and climate change. She was also permitted to deliver special reports. As commissioner, she delivered 17 reports to the legislature on topics including environmental injustice to First Nations, electricity, waste and circular economy, endangered species, water pollution, soil health and climate policy.

On November 15, 2018, the Progressive Conservative (PC) government announced their intention to abolish the position of environment commissioner, transferring some of its functions to the auditor general. Saxe had published reports critical of the incoming administration's environmental positions, including the absence of a climate change policy. The decision to eliminate independent environmental oversight was widely reported on. More than 200 scientists and researchers sent an open letter to Premier Doug Ford calling for reconsideration. Her last report was heavily critical of the Ford government. After 25 years, the position of the environmental commissioner of Ontario ceased to exist when the Environmental Bill of Rights was amended on April 1, 2019.

=== Return to private practice ===
After her tenure as the environmental commissioner, Saxe reopened her SaxeFacts environmental law practice focused on climate issues. She publishes articles and a blog and presents on climate issues. She was a McMurtry Clinical Fellow at Osgoode Hall Law School from 2019 to 2020, is a senior fellow at Massey College, and an adjunct professor at the University of Toronto School of the Environment. She hosts a podcast called "Green Economy Heroes" features interviews with green business leaders, and has also been a public support to the youth climate strikes movement in Toronto.

== Political career ==
=== 2022 provincial election ===
Saxe ran for the Green Party of Ontario in University—Rosedale. Her candidacy was confirmed along with the deputy leader role on November 30, 2020. She has cited the "climate crisis" as a primary reason for her political run as well as the well-publicized conflict with Ford over the closure of her office. The riding was one of a small number of ridings the Ontario Greens targeted to add to the single-seat caucus of provincial leader Mike Schreiner in the 2022 election; Saxe featured prominently in party campaign messaging and her riding was chosen for the platform launch.

Housing policy and sprawl—key policy battles in Greater Toronto—were a focus of Saxe's campaign to curb Ontario emissions. The official party platform listed mental health, affordable housing, and the climate economy as its primary election pillars.

Saxe came in fourth place, with 6,092 total votes for a share of 15.9 per cent; the riding was won by the incumbent, New Democratic Party (NDP) member of Provincial Parliament (MPP) Jessica Bell. Saxe nearly tripled the Green vote share achieved in the 2018 provincial election.

=== 2022 municipal election ===
Ward 11 University—Rosedale was left vacant for the 2022 election when Councillor Mike Layton announced he would not seek re-election. Saxe announced her candidacy for the 2022 Toronto municipal election, concluding on October 24, 2022. Saxe stated that she was running as an independent municipally and would resign as deputy leader of the GPO if elected.

Saxe list housing, mobility, climate and sustainability, and a city in good repair as her primary platform planks.

She won with 8,614 votes and 35.37 per cent of the total vote, winning by only 123 votes over the second place candidate, Norm Di Pasquale. She officially took office on November 15, 2022.

=== City Council ===
Saxe's first year on Toronto City Council coincided with the resignation of Mayor John Tory and the 2023 Toronto mayoral by-election that saw Olivia Chow assume the mayoralty. Saxe held a number of committee appointments across both administrations, often relating to her background in environment and law. Among her appointments was the Infrastructure and Environment Committee. Under Mayor Chow she was also appointed to the boards of the Toronto Transit Commission and Toronto Hydro.

Her council roles included:

- Infrastructure and Environment Committee
- Toronto and East York Community Council
- Toronto Atmospheric Fund Board of Directors
- Toronto Transit Commission
- National Zero Waste Council Management Board
- Toronto and Region Conservation Authority
- Toronto Hydro Corporation
- 58 Cecil Street Community Centre Board of Management
- William H.(Bill) Bolton Arena Board of Management

=== 2026 municipal election ===
Saxe initially registered to seek re-election in Ward 11 University—Rosedale in the 2026 Toronto municipal election.

On August 21, 2026, the final day for nominations, Saxe withdrew her candidacy in University—Rosedale and registered instead to run in Ward 14 Toronto—Danforth. The change came two days after incumbent councillor Paula Fletcher announced that she would retire rather than seek re-election. Saxe's move also came days after former University—Rosedale councillor Mike Layton entered the Ward 11 race.

Saxe's decision to change wards was criticized by Toronto Star contributor John Lorinc, who characterized it as political "carpet-bagging" and argued that her experience in University—Rosedale could not substitute for detailed knowledge of Toronto—Danforth's residents, businesses and community organizations. Lorinc contrasted Saxe's lack of local experience with that of two of her opponents: former councillor Mary Fragedakis, who represented the area from 2010 to 2018, and former local school trustee Sarah Ehrhardt. In September, the Toronto Sun reported a resident's complaint that Saxe and the city had been unresponsive about rattling manhole covers in University—Rosedale.

Saxe finished third in Toronto—Danforth, receiving 3,857 votes (8.38%). Sara Ehrhardt won with 22,440 votes (48.78%), followed by Mary Fragedakis with 10,425 (22.66%). Saxe's term on city council ended on November 15, 2026. She was succeeded in Ward 11 by Mike Layton.

== Awards and recognition ==
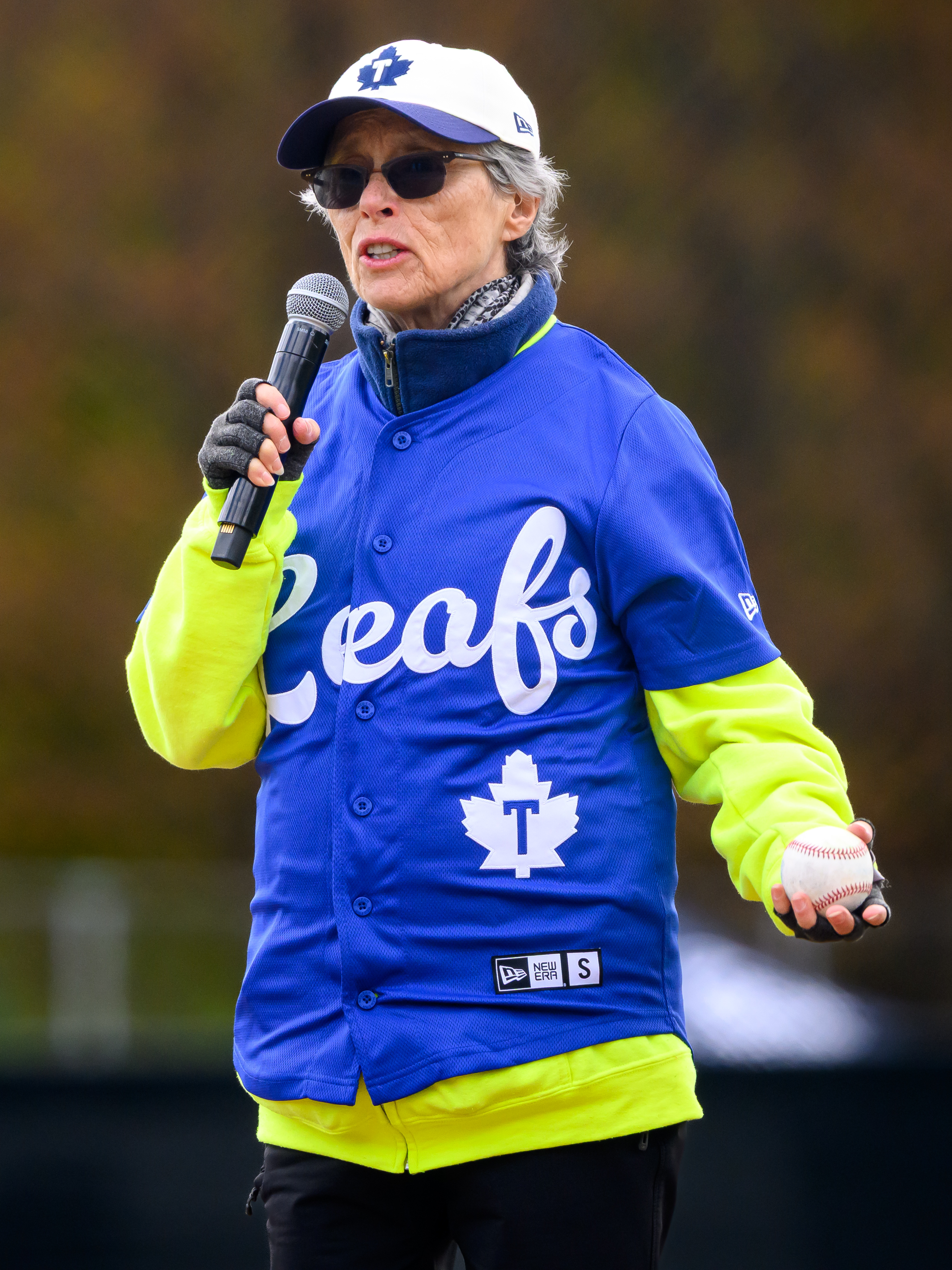
Saxe prior to throwing the ceremonial first pitch at a Toronto Maple Leafs game in 2026

Saxe is a recipient of numerous awards, including specialist certifications from The Law Society of Upper Canada, Osgoode Hall Law School Alumni Gold Key for Achievement and a 2020 Law Society Medal for exemplary leadership in environmental law. In August 2020, Saxe completed her training to become an En-ROADS Climate Ambassador, a member in the international network that leads climate simulation events developed by Climate Interactiv and the MIT Sloan Sustainability Initiative.

Saxe sat on a number of public and private boards, including Draxis Health, Solarshare, WindShare and Evergreen, helped to manage the endowment of the Ontario Bar Association and is recognized as board-ready by Women in Capital Markets. In June 2022, she was awarded an honorary doctorate of Environmental Studies from the University of Waterloo.

== Personal life ==
Dianne Marie Shulman was born in Toronto on November 27, 1952, to Gloria (née Bossin) and Dr. Morton Shulman. He was Metropolitan Toronto's Chief Coroner in the mid-1960s, dealing with such files as vehicle safety issues and deaths caused by clandestine abortions. He then served in the Ontario Legislative Assembly from 1967 to 1975 as a New Democratic Party (NDP) Member of Provincial Parliament (MPP). He represented the High Park electoral district, where his medical practice was located.

She was married for 42 years to Stewart Saxe until his death in November 2014. Their daughters are MIT neuroscience professor Rebecca Saxe, and University of Toronto civil engineering professor, Shoshanna Saxe.

== Publications ==
=== Books ===
- Saxe, Dianne (1990a). Environmental Offences Corporate Responsibility and Executive Liability. Aurora, ON: Canada Law Book.
- Saxe, Dianne (1990b). Ontario Environmental Protection Act Annotated. Aurora, ON: Canada Law Book Inc.
- Saxe, Dianne (1994). A Buyer's Guide to Contaminated Land. Toronto: Edmond Montgomery.

== Electoral history ==
2026 Toronto municipal election, Ward 14 Toronto—Danforth
Candidate	Votes	Vote share
Sara Ehrhardt	22,440	48.78%
Mary Fragedakis	10,425	22.66%
Dianne Saxe	3,857	8.38%
Susan Chapelle	1,675	3.64%
Maria Voutsinas	1,658	3.60%
Caryma Sa'd	986	2.14%
Maqsood Ahmad	847	1.84%
Denise Walcott	651	1.42%
Peter De Marco	594	1.29%
Michael Connor	591	1.28%
Christiane Tetreault	520	1.13%
George Fawcett	433	0.94%
Michael Mitchell	328	0.71%
John Kladitis	287	0.62%
Jason Stevens	268	0.58%
Devyn Stackhouse	169	0.37%
Dennis Corcoran	149	0.32%
Robb Dagenais	128	0.28%
Source: City of Toronto

2022 Toronto municipal election, Ward 11 University—Rosedale

Candidate	Vote	%
Dianne Saxe	8,614	35.37
Norm Di Pasquale	8,491	34.87
Robin Buxton Potts	2,156	8.85
Peter Lovering	1,321	5.42
Andrew Layman	683	2.80
Ann Rohmer	589	2.42
Adam Golding	481	1.98
Alison Pang	465	1.91
Axel Arvizu	463	1.90
Diana Yoon	415	1.70
Michael Borrelli	245	1.01
David Fielder	177	0.73
Pierre Therrien	169	0.69
Heather Shon	82	0.34

2022 Ontario general election: University—Rosedale
Party	Candidate	Votes	%	±%	Expenditures
New Democratic	Jessica Bell	13,961	37.55	−12.11	$96,148
Liberal	Andrea Barrack	10,172	27.36	+5.30	$120,103
Progressive Conservative	Carl Qiu	6,535	17.58	−3.53	$43,740
Green	Dianne Saxe	5,904	15.88	+10.51	$118,893
New Blue	James Leventakis	469	1.26		$47
Stop the New Sex-Ed Agenda	John Kanary	140	0.38		$0
Total valid votes/expense limit		37,181	99.49	+0.45	$121,100
Total rejected, unmarked, and declined ballots		189	0.51	−0.45	
Turnout		37,370	43.20	−13.43	
Eligible voters		86,192			
New Democratic hold		Swing		−8.71	
Source(s): "Summary of Valid Votes Cast for Each Candidate" (PDF). Elections Ontario. 2022. Archived from the original on May 18, 2023.; "Statistical Summary by Electoral District" (PDF). Elections Ontario. 2022. Archived from the original on May 21, 2023.
