= Paula Fletcher =

Canadian politician

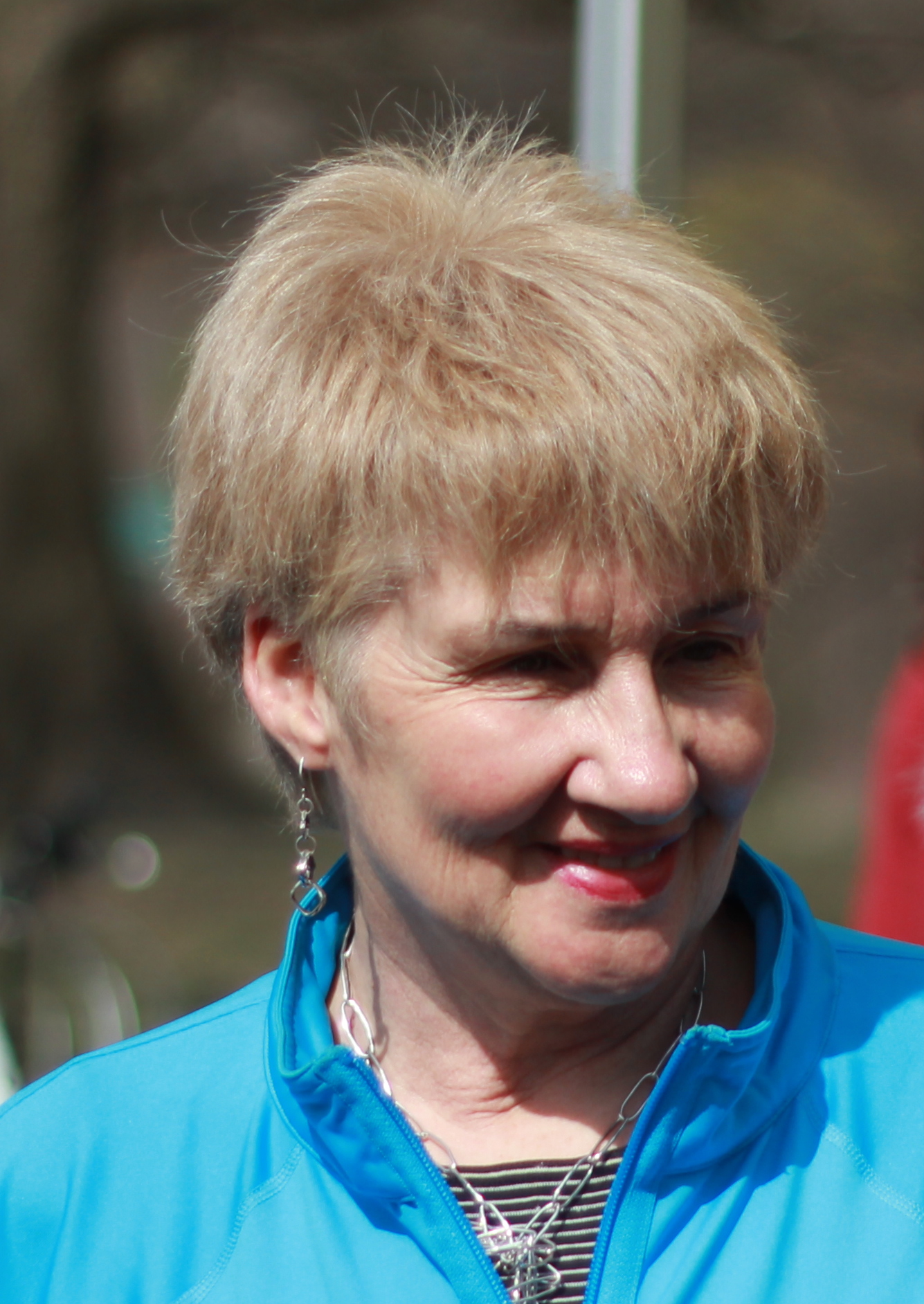
- Fletcher in 2014

Deputy Speaker of Toronto City Council
- In office August 10, 2023 – November 15, 2026
- Preceded by: Stephen Holyday
- Succeeded by: Shelley Carroll

Chair of the Infrastructure and Environment Committee
- In office May 21, 2025 – November 15, 2026
- Preceded by: Jennifer McKelvie

Toronto City Councillor for Ward 14 Toronto—Danforth
- In office December 1, 2018 – November 15, 2026
- Preceded by: Ward created
- Succeeded by: Sara Ehrhardt

Toronto City Councillor for Ward 30 Toronto—Danforth (Broadview-Greenwood; 2003 to 2006)
- In office December 1, 2003 – December 1, 2018
- Preceded by: Jack Layton
- Succeeded by: Ward dissolved

Toronto District School Board Trustee for Ward 15 Broadview-Greenwood
- In office December 1, 2000 – December 1, 2003
- Succeeded by: Rick Telfer

Leader of the Communist Party of Manitoba
- In office 1981–1986
- Preceded by: William Cecil Ross
- Succeeded by: Lorne Robson

Personal details
- Born: 1951 (age 74–75) Sault Ste. Marie, Ontario, Canada
- Party: Independent
- Other political affiliations: Communist (Manitoba)
- Spouse: John Cartwright
- Children: 2
- Occupation: Politician; union organizer

Paula Fletcher (born 1951) is a Canadian former politician who served on Toronto City Council from 2003 to 2026, representing Toronto—Danforth. She was deputy Speaker of Toronto City Council from 2023 to 2026 and chair of the Infrastructure and Environment Committee from 2025 to 2026.

Fletcher was first elected to council in 2003, succeeding Jack Layton, and was re-elected five times. She announced her retirement on August 19, 2026, and did not seek re-election in the 2026 Toronto municipal election. She was succeeded as councillor for Ward 14 Toronto—Danforth by Sara Ehrhardt.

== Early life and family ==
Fletcher was born in Sault Ste. Marie, Ontario and moved to Toronto, then to Winnipeg, Manitoba, before again relocating to Toronto.

She lives in Toronto with her husband John Cartwright and their two children. Her husband is a former president of the Toronto & York Region Labour Council. A carpenter by trade, Cartwright was formerly the business manager of the Construction Trades Council and co-chair of the Metro Jobstart Coalition.

== Early career ==
In Winnipeg, Fletcher worked as an educator in international development and became a community activist. She was a union organizer in a Toronto garment mill in the early 1970s. She later worked at the Downsview De Havilland Canada plant, where she went by the nickname "Rosie the Riveter". At De Havilland, she was involved in the women's committee of Canadian Auto Workers Local 112. In the 1990s, Fletcher worked at Toronto City Hall as executive assistant to city councillor Dan Leckie.

=== Politics ===
In 1980, Fletcher ran for the Winnipeg School Board for Ward 2, in the city's north end. In 1981, she was elected leader of the Communist Party of Canada (Manitoba) and served as leader for five years. She ran in the 1981 and 1986 provincial elections in the Winnipeg riding of Burrows, receiving 144 and 131 votes respectively. In the early 1980s, she sang with a group called Rank and File. In 1986, Fletcher left the Communist Party and moved back to Toronto.

=== Toronto District School Board trustee ===
In 2000, Fletcher was elected as a trustee for Ward 15 on the Toronto District School Board (TDSB). During her time on the board, she opposed service cuts by the Mike Harris and Ernie Eves Progressive Conservative governments and helped prevent two school closures in her area. One was Bruce Junior Public School, which was retained after a centre for childhood learning and development was established there.

== Toronto City Council ==
=== Election and early tenure ===
When Jack Layton resigned from council to run for the leadership of the New Democratic Party (NDP), Fletcher ran to replace him and received the endorsement of Layton and NDP MPP Marilyn Churley.

In the 2003 municipal election, eight candidates competed in Ward 30. Prominent candidates included Chris Phibbs, a former executive assistant to councillor Kyle Rae, and Maureen Gilroy, who had the backing of Liberal MP Dennis Mills. A key issue was the proposed fixed link to the Toronto Island Airport, which Fletcher opposed. Fletcher won with 39.5 per cent of the vote.

As a councillor, Fletcher rallied city council to oppose the Portlands Energy Centre, a 550-megawatt power plant in the Port Lands beside the Hearn Generating Station. The campaign was unsuccessful and the plant was completed in 2007. Developments in Ward 30 that Fletcher supported included Filmport, now Pinewood Toronto Studios, and the Zhong Hua Men Archway.

=== Second term ===
Fletcher was re-elected in the 2006 municipal election with 60.2 per cent of the vote.

During her second term, Fletcher chaired the Parks and Environment Committee and served on mayor David Miller's Executive Committee. She also served on the boards of Toronto Public Health and the Toronto Community Housing Corporation.

==== Leslieville SmartCentres development ====
In 2009, Fletcher opposed an application by SmartCentres to build a 65,000 m^{2} (700,000 sq ft) retail development on land occupied by Toronto Film Studios in the city's Studio District. The project required rezoning industrial land for retail use. City council rejected the proposal and the Ontario Municipal Board upheld the decision in March 2009.

==== 2010 budget outburst ====
On March 2, 2010, Fletcher had a heated exchange with a member of the public during deputations on Toronto's budget. After the speaker told Fletcher that she should be fired, she responded, "Oh, come and run against me. Come on down, baby!" Fletcher subsequently apologized for her comments.

==== Cycling ====
Fletcher has advocated for expanded cycling infrastructure in Toronto. In May 2010, however, she mistakenly voted against a proposal for bicycle lanes on University Avenue. The proposal failed on a 15–13 vote. Fletcher said afterward that she had intended to vote in favour and attributed the error to fatigue and the electronic voting system.

=== Third and fourth terms ===
In the 2010 municipal election, Fletcher narrowly defeated former Citytv reporter Liz West by 259 votes. West had received the support of mayoral candidate Rob Ford.

Fletcher was re-elected in the 2014 municipal election, defeating West and four other candidates with 49.63 per cent of the vote.

=== Fifth term ===
For the 2018 Toronto municipal election, the Ontario government's reduction of Toronto City Council from 47 proposed wards to 25 combined Fletcher's Ward 30 with much of neighbouring Ward 29. Fletcher consequently ran against Ward 29 incumbent Mary Fragedakis in the newly created Ward 14 Toronto—Danforth. Fletcher won with 42.27 per cent of the vote, compared with 26.18 per cent for Fragedakis.

During the term, Fletcher became closely involved in the redesign of Danforth Avenue. In May 2020, during the COVID-19 pandemic, city council approved temporary ActiveTO cycle tracks on Danforth Avenue from Broadview Avenue to Dawes Road. Fletcher successfully moved amendments directing staff to incorporate patios, seating areas and other economic-vitality measures into the project. The Danforth cycle tracks were subsequently incorporated into the permanent cycling network in December 2021.

Fletcher was elected vice-chair of the city's Planning and Housing Committee in January 2021 for the remainder of the 2018–2022 council term.

She also served on the board of the Toronto Seniors Housing Corporation, the municipal corporation established to manage housing for senior tenants.

=== Sixth term ===
Fletcher was re-elected in the 2022 Toronto municipal election with 20,305 votes, or 74.02 per cent of ballots cast.

In February 2023, Fletcher moved to establish a subcommittee of the Toronto and East York Community Council to examine construction of the Ontario Line and its effects on communities along the route. The subcommittee subsequently developed recommendations concerning construction management, traffic, pedestrian safety, noise, community benefits and communication with communities affected by the project. Fletcher continued to raise Ontario Line construction issues in later council and community council proceedings.

In September 2023, council adopted a Fletcher motion directing staff to establish a Ward 14 affordable-housing pilot for active development applications, including the East Harbour and Gerrard-Carlaw North transit-oriented communities. The pilot called for affordable-housing targets at least equal to those required by the city's inclusionary-zoning policy.

On August 10, 2023, city council elected Fletcher deputy speaker for the remainder of the 2022–2026 council term following the resignation of Stephen Holyday from the position. In this role, Fletcher presided over meetings of council when the speaker was absent. She served until the conclusion of the council term on November 15, 2026.

Mayor Olivia Chow also appointed Fletcher as the mayor's designate on several city bodies, including CreateTO and the TO Live board.

On May 21, 2025, Chow appointed Fletcher chair of the Infrastructure and Environment Committee, effective immediately and continuing through November 14, 2026.

On August 19, 2026, Fletcher announced that she would not seek re-election in the 2026 Toronto municipal election, abandoning earlier plans to run again. Her term ended on November 14, 2026, concluding 23 years on Toronto City Council. She was succeeded by Sara Ehrhardt, who won the Ward 14 election.

== Electoral history ==
2022 municipal election, Ward 14 Toronto—Danforth
Candidate	Votes	Vote share
Paula Fletcher	20,305	74.02%
Wali Abro	1,982	7.22%
James Dyson	1,937	7.06%
Denise Walcott	1,740	6.34%
John De Marco	1,469	5.35%
Total	27,433	100%

2018 Toronto municipal election, Ward 14 Toronto—Danforth
Candidate	Votes	Vote share
Paula Fletcher	16,468	42.27%
Mary Fragedakis	10,201	26.18%
Chris Budo	7,394	18.98%
Lanrick Bennett	1,935	4.97%
Dixon Chan	1,100	2.82%
Chris Marinakis	700	1.80%
Marisol D'Andrea	429	1.10%
Ryan Lindsay	413	1.06%
Lawrence Lychowyd	188	0.48%
Alexander Pena	131	0.34%
Source: City of Toronto

2014 Toronto municipal election, Ward 30 Toronto—Danforth
Candidate	Votes	%
Paula Fletcher	11,924	49.63%
Liz West	6,644	27.65%
Jane Farrow	4,815	20.04%
Mark Borden	302	1.26%
Francis Russell	206	0.86%
Daniel Trayes	134	0.56%
Total	24,025	100%

2010 Toronto municipal election, Ward 30 Toronto—Danforth
Candidate	Votes	%
Paula Fletcher	8,766	45.35%
Liz West	8,507	44.01%
Andrew James	620	3.20%
Mark Dewdney	518	2.68%
Mihaly Varga	313	1.62%
Angie Tingas	262	1.36%
Andreas Bogojevic	198	1.02%
Gary Walsh	143	0.74%
Total	19,327	100%

2006 Toronto municipal election, Ward 30 Toronto—Danforth
Candidate	Votes	%
Paula Fletcher	7,936	60.2
Suzanne McCormick	3,470	26.3
Edward Chin	937	7.1
Michael Zubiak	522	4.0
Patrick Kraemer	220	1.7
Daniel Nicastro	96	0.7
Total	13,181	100%

2003 Toronto municipal election, Ward 30 Broadview—Greenwood
Candidate	Votes	%
Paula Fletcher	6,460	39.5
Chris Phibbs	4,271	26.1
Maureen Gilroy	3,161	19.3
Suzanne McCormick	832	5.1
Bruce Brackett	722	4.4
Greg Bonser	510	3.1
Sean Lough	237	1.4
Jim Brookman	179	1.1
Total	16,372	100%

1986 Manitoba general election: Burrows
Party	Candidate	Votes	%	±%
New Democratic	Conrad Santos	3,547	53.04	-9.95
Independent	William Chornopyski	1,437	21.49	
Progressive Conservative	Nick Trusewych	950	14.20	-3.63
Liberal	Rory MacLeod	587	8.78	+0.83
Communist	Paula Fletcher	131	1.96	+0.11
Independent	Ted DuRussel	36	0.54	
Total valid votes		6,688		

1981 Manitoba general election: Burrows
Party	Candidate	Votes	%	±%
New Democratic	Conrad Santos	4,890	62.99	
Progressive Conservative	Mary Shore	1,384	17.83	
Progressive	Ben Hanuschak	728	9.38	
Liberal	Wayne Anderson	617	7.95	
Communist	Paula Fletcher	144	1.85	
Total valid votes		7,763		
