= Nekpen Obasogie =

Nigerian writer

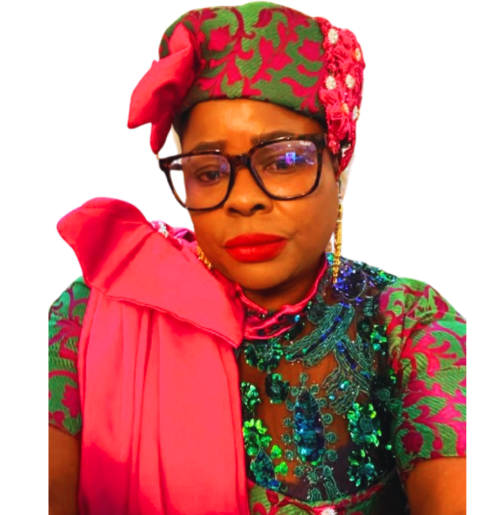
- Born: Nigeria
- Education: Master's Degree
- Alma mater: York University, Canada
- Occupation: Writer
- Notable work: Great Benin: The Alcazar of Post-Colonial Culture
- Awards: Honorary Pen Award

Nekpen Obasogie is a Canada-based Nigerian writer. She is the author of the book Great Benin: The Alcazar of Post-Colonial Culture. In 2022, she received the honorary Pen Award for her contributions to the promotion of the Benin culture. In 2022, she initiated the annual Edo Language Day Worldwide, which is August 13 every year. She is a council candidate for the municipal election in York South-Weston ward in Toronto, Canada.

== Background ==
Nekpen Obasogie was born in Benin City, the capital city of Edo State in Nigeria. She later moved to Canada where she now lives.

== Work ==
Her interest in Benin History and culture have seen her produced different literary piece in the subject area. This include her books titled Benin Warriors and the British Colonial Rule in Nigeria and Great Benin: The Alcazar of Post-Colonial Culture. She is the CEO of NEBO TV Canada. In 2022, she initiated the annual Edo Language Day Worldwide, which is August 13 every year. Nekpen is also the founder and manager of Canadian Council for Family Services in Toronto. She served as Assistant Secretary to the Nigerian Canadian Association in Toronto (NCA) from 2021 to 2023. She is running for 2026 Toronto city councillor for York South-Weston ward.
