= Etobicoke Centre =

Etobicoke Centre may refer to:

- Etobicoke Centre (federal electoral district), federal riding in Toronto, Ontario, Canada
- Etobicoke Centre (provincial electoral district), provincial riding in Toronto, Ontario, Canada
- Ward 2 Etobicoke Centre, municipal ward in Toronto, Ontario, Canada
- Etobicoke, former city, now part of Toronto, Ontario, Canada
