= Ward 14 Toronto—Danforth =

Municipal council district in Toronto, Ontario, Canada

- Constituency for the Toronto City Council
- Location of Ward 14 in Toronto
- City: Toronto
- Population: 106,875 (2016)

Current constituency
- Created: 2018
- Councillor: Sara Ehrhardt
- Community council: Toronto/East York
- Created from: Ward 29; Ward 30 (partial)
- First contested: 2018 election
- Last contested: 2026 election
- Ward profile: www.toronto.ca/ward-14-toronto-danforth/

Ward 14 Toronto—Danforth is a municipal electoral division in Toronto, Ontario, Canada for the Toronto City Council. It was last contested in 2026, with Sara Ehrhardt elected as the councillor.

== Boundaries ==
On August 14, 2018, the Government of Ontario redrew municipal boundaries via the Better Local Government Act, 2018, S.O. 2018, c. 11 - Bill 5. This means that the 25 provincial electoral districts and the 25 municipal wards in Toronto currently share the same geographic borders.

Defined in legislation as:

Consisting of that part of the City of Toronto described as follows: commencing at the intersection of Highway No. 401 with Leslie Street; thence generally southerly along said street to Eglinton Avenue East; thence westerly along said avenue to the Don River West Branch; thence generally southeasterly along said branch to Overlea Boulevard; thence easterly along said boulevard to Don Mills Road; thence southerly along said road to the Don River East Branch; thence generally southwesterly along said branch and the Don River to Pottery Road; thence northwesterly and southwesterly along said road to Bayview Avenue; thence generally northerly and northwesterly along said avenue to the Canadian Pacific Railway situated northwesterly of Nesbitt Drive; thence southwesterly along said railway to the Beltline Trail situated in the Moore Park Ravine; thence generally northwesterly along said trail to the southerly boundary of the Mount Pleasant Cemetery; thence generally westerly along said boundary to Mount Pleasant Road; thence northerly along said road to Broadway Avenue; thence westerly along said avenue to Yonge Street; thence northerly along said street to Highway No. 401; thence northeasterly and easterly along said highway to the point of commencement.

== History ==
=== 2018 boundary adjustment ===
Toronto municipal ward boundaries were significantly modified in 2018 during the election campaign. Ultimately the new ward structure was used and later upheld by the Supreme Court of Canada in 2021.

The current ward is made up of parts of the former Ward 29 Toronto—Danforth, the former Ward 30 Toronto—Danforth and southwest portion of the former Ward 32 Beaches—East York.

=== 2018 municipal election ===
Ward 14 was first contested during the 2018 municipal election, with candidates including Ward 30 incumbent Paula Fletcher and Ward 29 incumbent Mary Fragedakis. Fletcher was ultimately elected with 42.27 per cent of the vote.

== Geography ==
Ward 14 is part of the Toronto and East York community council.

Toronto—Danforth's boundaries mirror its federal and provincial counterparts: bordered on the south by Lake Ontario and Toronto Harbour, on the east by Coxwell Avenue and Coxwell Boulevard, on the north by Taylor Creek and the Don River East Branch, and on the west by the Don River.

== Councillors ==
Council term	Member	
Council term	Ward 29 Broadview—Greenwood	Ward 30 Broadview—Greenwood
2000–2003	Case Ootes	Jack Layton
2003–2006	Case Ootes	Paula Fletcher
2006–2010	Case Ootes	Paula Fletcher
2010–2014	Mary Fragedakis	Paula Fletcher
2014–2018	Mary Fragedakis	Paula Fletcher
	Ward 14 Toronto—Danforth	
2018–2022	Paula Fletcher	
2022–2026	Paula Fletcher	
2026–2030	Sara Ehrhardt	

== Election results ==
2026 Toronto municipal election

Candidate	Votes	%	minus
Sara Ehrhardt	22,440	48.78	–
Mary Fragedakis	10,425	22.66	–
Dianne Saxe	3,857	8.38	–
Susan Chapelle	1,675	3.64	–
Maria Voutsinas	1,658	3.60	–
Caryma Sa'd	986	2.14	–
Maqsood Ahmad	847	1.84	–
Denise Walcott	651	1.42	4.92 ▼
Peter De Marco	594	1.29	–
Michael Connor	591	1.28	–
Christiane Tetreault	520	1.13	–
George Fawcett	433	0.94	–
Michael Mitchell	328	0.71	–
John Kladitis	287	0.62	–
Jason Stevens	268	0.58	–
Devyn Stackhouse	169	0.37	–
Dennis Corcoran	149	0.32	–
Robb Dagenais	128	0.28	–

2022 Toronto municipal election

Candidate	Vote	%
Paula Fletcher (X)	20,305	74.02
Wali Abro	1,982	7.22
James Dyson	1,937	7.06
Denise Walcott	1,740	6.34
John De Marco	1,469	5.35

2018 Toronto municipal election, Ward 14 Toronto—Danforth
Candidate	Votes	Vote share
Paula Fletcher	16,468	42.27%
Mary Fragedakis	10,201	26.18%
Chris Budo	7,394	18.98%
Lanrick Bennett	1,935	4.97%
Dixon Chan	1,100	2.82%
Chris Marinakis	700	1.80%
Marisol D'Andrea	429	1.10%
Ryan Lindsay	413	1.06%
Lawrence Lychowyd	188	0.48%
Alexander Pena	131	0.34%
Total	38,958	100%
Source: City of Toronto

== See also ==
- Municipal elections in Canada
- Municipal government of Toronto
- List of Toronto municipal elections
