= Progress Toronto =

Canadian progressive municipal advocacy organization

- Logo
- Formation: 12 March 2018; 8 years ago
- Type: Municipal advocacy organization (NFPO)
- Purpose: To advocate for progressive policies and candidates in Toronto
- Headquarters: Toronto, Ontario, Canada
- Executive Director: Saman Tabasinejad
- Website: Official website

Progress Toronto is a Canadian left-wing progressive municipal advocacy organization founded in 2018 by Michal Hay. Based in Toronto, Ontario, it supports election candidates for Toronto City Council and the Toronto District School Board and campaigns on issues including affordable housing, public transit and municipal services.

The organization endorses candidates it calls "Progressive Champions" and organizes volunteers to canvass, telephone voters and distribute campaign literature. Hay served as its executive director before becoming chief of staff to Toronto mayor Olivia Chow in 2023. She was succeeded as executive director by Saman Tabasinejad.

== History and electoral activity ==
Progress Toronto was established on March 12, 2018, following the election victories of centre-right candidates Rob Ford in 2010 and John Tory in 2014. Its stated purpose was to help elect progressive candidates in Toronto's officially non-partisan municipal elections.

The organization endorsed candidates in the 2018 Toronto municipal election. Its efforts were affected by the Ontario government's decision to reduce the number of Toronto City Council wards from 47 to 25, which eliminated several races involving progressive challengers. Some candidates endorsed by Progress Toronto also received endorsements from the editorial board of the Toronto Star.

In the 2018 election, three of the eight school trustee candidates endorsed by Progress Toronto were elected. In the 2022 Toronto municipal election, five newly elected councillors supported by the organization, including Ausma Malik, Alejandra Bravo and Chris Moise, won seats on Toronto City Council. Six school trustee candidates it endorsed were also elected.

Progress Toronto supported candidates in the 2022 Toronto municipal election and endorsed Olivia Chow in the 2023 Toronto mayoral by-election, which Chow won.

During the 2023 mayoral by-election, Progress Toronto organized volunteer canvassing, voter outreach and fundraising in support of Chow's candidacy. Following her election, Chow appointed Hay as her chief of staff.

In the 2024 Don Valley West city council by-election, the organization campaigned against former newspaper columnist Anthony Furey, distributing approximately 22,000 flyers criticizing his previous public statements on social issues. Furey's campaign subsequently attributed part of his defeat to Progress Toronto's activities.

In the 2026 Toronto municipal election, Progress Toronto announced an initial group of six endorsed city council candidates in September 2026. The organization also endorsed Chow for re-election as mayor in October.

Ahead of the 2026 election, Progress Toronto conducted advertising campaigns criticizing former mayor John Tory and councillor Brad Bradford. In April 2026, it ran advertisements questioning Bradford's political positions. The following month, the organization filed a complaint with Toronto's integrity commissioner concerning a paid event featuring Bradford and a property developer. A second complaint, filed in July, concerned Bradford's vote on development charges and his wife's employment with a property developer.

Progress Toronto also organized volunteers for community events and voter outreach during the election year. In July 2026, Hay became co-chair of Chow's re-election campaign alongside Liberal political strategist Andrew Bevan.

Progress Toronto has been compared to an informal municipal political party because of its endorsements, fundraising and volunteer organizing. CBC News described the organization as representing the left of Toronto municipal politics, while The Local characterized it and the centre-right organization ABC Toronto as "shadow parties". Unlike registered political parties, the organizations operate as third-party advertisers and cannot coordinate campaign fundraising or expenditures with candidates.

According to lawyer Donald Eady, a member of Progress Toronto's board, the organization was established partly in response to concerns among progressive activists about the influence of property developers and private fundraising on municipal politics.

== Organization and funding ==
Progress Toronto is funded through individual donations and event sponsorships. In 2026, the organization reported that approximately 70 per cent of its funding came from small individual donations, with the remaining 30 per cent coming from event sponsors. Its executive director, Saman Tabasinejad, said that the organization had approximately 2,000 volunteers.

The organization registered as a third-party advertiser for the 2026 municipal election on September 11, 2026.

== See also ==
- ABC Toronto
- Politics of Toronto
- Toronto City Council
