= Toronto & York Region Labour Council =

Regional labour council in Ontario, Canada

- Abbreviation: TYRLC
- Formation: 12 April 1871; 155 years ago
- Headquarters: 895 Don Mills Road, Toronto, Ontario
- Region served: Toronto and York Region
- Affiliations: Canadian Labour Congress
- Website: www.labourcouncil.ca

The Toronto & York Region Labour Council (TYRLC) is a regional labour council representing affiliated trade unions in Toronto and the York Region, Ontario, Canada. Founded in 1871, it advocates on labour, social justice and public-policy issues. It has been described as the largest and most diverse labour council in Canada.

== History ==
=== Founding and early years ===
The council traces its origins to the Toronto Trades Assembly, founded on 12 April 1871. Its establishment followed discussions initiated by members of the Coopers International Union in February 1871. Delegates from several unions met on 27 March, and the assembly was formally constituted the following month. Its founding organizations included unions representing bakers, cigar makers, iron moulders, coopers, printers and shoemakers.

The assembly coordinated the activities of Toronto's trade unions and campaigned for improved working conditions. It also organized lectures and recreational activities for workers and their families and published the Ontario Workman, described by Heritage Toronto as Canada's first labour newspaper.

In 1872, the assembly supported striking members of the Toronto Typographical Union who demanded a nine-hour working day. The strike resulted in the arrest of union leaders under laws prohibiting criminal conspiracy. Public demonstrations in support of the printers contributed to pressure for legislative reform, and Parliament passed the Trade Unions Act later that year.

By 1872, the assembly included 27 affiliated unions, representing workers in woodworking, construction, carriage making, metalworking and other trades. It also campaigned for shorter working hours, improved workplace sanitation and restrictions on child labour.

The economic depression of the 1870s weakened organized labour in Toronto, and the assembly ceased to operate by the end of the decade. A successor organization, the Toronto Trades and Labour Council, was established in July 1881. The council became involved in the formation of a national federation of trade unions in 1883, a predecessor of the Trades and Labour Congress of Canada.

=== Political activity ===
During the early twentieth century, the Toronto District Labour Council became involved in debates over independent labour political action. Most council delegates supported the formation of a labour party controlled by trade unionists, but divisions within the council hindered the development of an effective alternative political party in Toronto.

The council supported labour candidates and participated in efforts to establish independent labour political organizations, including the Canadian Labour Party.

=== Community campaigns ===
The council's activities expanded beyond workplace issues to include public services, education, racial equality and environmental policy. It has worked with community organizations on campaigns concerning economic inequality and discrimination.

Since 2003, the council has organized an annual Indigenous and Workers of Colour conference, addressing racial discrimination and barriers faced by Indigenous and racialized workers in employment and the labour movement.

== Labour Day Parade ==
The council organizes Toronto's annual Labour Day Parade, attended by members of affiliated unions and other labour organizations.

The parade traces its origins to the labour demonstrations held in Toronto in 1872 during the printers' strike. These demonstrations contributed to the development of organized Labour Day celebrations in Canada. The federal government established Labour Day as a statutory holiday in 1894.

== See also ==
- Canadian Labour Congress
- Labour candidates and parties in Canada
- Ontario Federation of Labour
- Trades and Labour Congress of Canada
