= Ward 11 University—Rosedale =

Municipal council district in Toronto, Ontario, Canada

- Constituency for the Toronto City Council
- Location of Ward 11 in Toronto
- City: Toronto
- Population: 104,310 (2016)

Current constituency
- Created: 2018
- Councillor: Mike Layton
- Community council: Toronto/East York
- Created from: Ward 19; Ward 20; Ward 27
- First contested: 2018 election
- Last contested: 2026 election
- Ward profile: www.toronto.ca/ward-11-university-rosedale/

Ward 11 University—Rosedale is a municipal electoral division in Toronto, Ontario, Canada that has been represented in the Toronto City Council since the 2018 municipal election. It was last contested in 2026, with Mike Layton being elected councillor.

== Boundaries ==
On August 14, 2018, the Government of Ontario redrew municipal boundaries via the Better Local Government Act, 2018, S.O. 2018, c. 11 - Bill 5. This means that the 25 provincial electoral districts and the 25 municipal wards in Toronto currently share the same geographic borders.

Defined in legislation as:

Consisting of that part of the City of Toronto described as follows: commencing at the intersection of College Street with Bay Street; thence northerly along Bay Street to Charles Street West; thence easterly along said street to Yonge Street; thence southerly along said street to Charles Street East; thence easterly along said street to Mount Pleasant Road; thence northerly along said road to Bloor Street East; thence easterly along said street to Sherbourne Street North; thence northerly along said street to Rosedale Valley Road; thence generally easterly along said road and its production to the Don River; thence generally northerly along said river to Pottery Road; thence northwesterly and southwesterly along said road to Bayview Avenue; thence generally northerly and northwesterly along said avenue to the Canadian Pacific Railway situated northwesterly of Nesbitt Drive; thence southwesterly along said railway to the Beltline Trail situated in the Moore Park Ravine; thence generally northwesterly along said trail to the southerly boundary of the Mount Pleasant Cemetery; thence generally westerly along said boundary to the northwesterly production of the Don River Tributary situated easterly of Avoca Avenue; thence generally southeasterly along said production and said tributary to the easterly production of Rosehill Avenue; thence westerly along said production and Rosehill Avenue to the westerly boundary of the Rosehill Reservoir; thence southerly along said boundary to Jackes Avenue; thence westerly along said avenue to Yonge Street; thence southerly along said street to the Canadian Pacific Railway; thence generally westerly along said railway to Ossington Avenue; thence southerly along said avenue to Dundas Street West; thence generally easterly along said street to Yonge Street; thence northerly along said street to College Street; thence westerly along said street to the point of commencement.

== History ==
=== 2018 boundary adjustment ===
Toronto municipal ward boundaries were significantly modified in 2018 during the election campaign. Ultimately the new ward structure was used and later upheld by the Supreme Court of Canada in 2021.

The current ward is made up of parts of the old Ward 19 Trinity—Spadina, Ward 20 Trinity—Spadina and Ward 27 Toronto Centre—Rosedale.

=== 2018 municipal election ===
Ward 11 University—Rosedale was first contested during the 2018 municipal election with seven candidates. Mike Layton was ultimately elected with 69.56 per cent of the vote.

== Geography ==
Ward 11 is part of the Toronto and East York community council.

University—Rosedale's west boundary is Ossington Avenue, and its east boundary is Bayview Avenue, the Don River, Rosedale Valley Road, Bloor Street, Charles Street, College Street and Yonge Street. The Canadian Pacific Railway tracks, Yonge Street, Mount Pleasant Cemetery and the Moore Park Ravine make up the north boundary, and Dundas Street makes up the south boundary.

It encompasses the neighbourhoods of University, the Discovery District, The Annex, Yorkville, and Rosedale.

== Councillors ==
Council term	Member
	Ward 11 University—Rosedale
2018–2022	Mike Layton
2022–2026	Dianne Saxe
2026–2030	Mike Layton

== Election results ==
2026 Toronto municipal election

Candidate	Votes	%	minus
Mike Layton	19,388	46.22	23.34* ▼
Diana Yoon	8,003	19.08	17.38 ▲
Karina Lemke	5,540	13.21	–
Terri Hawkes	3,782	9.02	–
Alice Li	2,877	6.86	–
Keenan Courtis	1,568	3.74	–
Gian Pileri	425	1.01	–
Paul Viret	236	0.56	–
Huy Lieu	125	0.30	–

Compared to 2018*

2022 Toronto municipal election

Candidate	Vote	%
Dianne Saxe	8,614	35.37
Norm Di Pasquale	8,491	34.87
Robin Buxton Potts	2,156	8.85
Peter Lovering	1,321	5.42
Andrew Layman	683	2.80
Ann Rohmer	589	2.42
Adam Golding	481	1.98
Alison Pang	465	1.91
Axel Arvizu	463	1.90
Diana Yoon	415	1.70
Michael Borrelli	245	1.01
David Fielder	177	0.73
Pierre Therrien	169	0.69
Heather Shon	82	0.34

2018 Toronto municipal election, Ward 11 University—Rosedale
Candidate	Votes	Vote share
Mike Layton	22,370	69.56%
Joyce Rowlands	4,231	13.16%
Nicki Ward	2,933	9.12%
Marc Cormier	995	3.09%
Michael Borrelli	671	2.09%
Michael Shaw	581	1.81%
George Sawision	376	1.17%
Total	32,157	100%
Source: City of Toronto

== See also ==
- Municipal elections in Canada
- Municipal government of Toronto
- List of Toronto municipal elections
