= Toronto City Council 2010–2014 =

The 2010-2014 Toronto City Council was created following the general election in 2010.

== Leadership ==
Speaker Frances Nunziata was elected December 1, 2010

The Mayor of Toronto for this session was Rob Ford.

== City council ==
On October 25, 2010, a record number of women were elected to council, with 15 female councillors comprising one third of all council members.

Councillor	Ward	Community Council	Federal Electoral District	Notes
Rob Ford	Mayor		-	Stripped of non-statutory powers and transferred to Deputy Mayor, City Clerk Office and City Council on November 18, 2013.
Vincent Crisanti	1	Etobicoke and York	Etobicoke North	Etobicoke and York Community Council Chair
Doug Ford	2	Etobicoke and York	Etobicoke North	Vice-chair of budget committee (de facto budget chair when budget chief unavailable)
Peter Leon	3	Etobicoke and York	Etobicoke Centre	Appointed to replace Doug Holyday after Holyday's election as MPP
Gloria Lindsay Luby	4	Etobicoke and York	Etobicoke Centre	
James Maloney	5	Etobicoke and York	Etobicoke—Lakeshore	Appointed July 7, 2014 to replace Peter Milczyn after Milczyn's election as MPP.
Mark Grimes	6	Etobicoke and York	Etobicoke—Lakeshore	
Giorgio Mammoliti	7	Etobicoke and York	York West	Community Development and Recreation Chair
Anthony Perruzza	8	North York	York West	
Maria Augimeri	9	North York	York Centre	North York Community Council Chair, TTC Chair
James Pasternak	10	North York	York Centre	
Frances Nunziata	11	Etobicoke and York	York South—Weston	Speaker
Frank Di Giorgio	12	Etobicoke and York	York South—Weston	Budget Chief
Sarah Doucette	13	Central Toronto and East York	Parkdale—High Park	
Gord Perks	14	Central Toronto and East York	Parkdale—High Park	Central Toronto and East York Community Council Chair
Josh Colle	15	North York	Eglinton—Lawrence	
Karen Stintz	16	North York	Eglinton—Lawrence	
Cesar Palacio	17	Central Toronto and East York	Davenport	Licensing and Standards Chair
Ana Bailão	18	Central Toronto and East York	Davenport	
Mike Layton	19	Central Toronto and East York	Trinity—Spadina	
Ceta Ramkhalawansingh	20	Central Toronto and East York	Trinity—Spadina	Appointed July 7, 2014, to replace Adam Vaughan after Vaughan's election as MP
Joe Mihevc	21	Central Toronto and East York	St. Paul's	
Josh Matlow	22	Central Toronto and East York	St. Paul's	
John Filion	23	North York	Willowdale	
David Shiner	24	North York	Willowdale	Executive At-Large Member
Jaye Robinson	25	North York	Don Valley West	
John Parker	26	North York	Don Valley West	Deputy Speaker
Kristyn Wong-Tam	27	Central Toronto and East York	Toronto Centre—Rosedale	
Pam McConnell	28	Central Toronto and East York	Toronto Centre—Rosedale	
Mary Fragedakis	29	Central Toronto and East York	Toronto—Danforth	
Paula Fletcher	30	Central Toronto and East York	Toronto—Danforth	
Janet Davis	31	Central Toronto and East York	Beaches—East York	
Mary-Margaret McMahon	32	Central Toronto and East York	Beaches—East York	
Shelley Carroll	33	North York	Don Valley East	
Denzil Minnan-Wong	34	North York	Don Valley East	Public Works Chair
Michelle Berardinetti	35	Scarborough	Scarborough Southwest	Scarborough Community Council Chair, Executive At-Large Member
Gary Crawford	36	Scarborough	Scarborough Southwest	
Michael Thompson	37	Scarborough	Scarborough Centre	Economic Development Chair
Glenn De Baeremaeker	38	Scarborough	Scarborough Centre	
Michael Del Grande	39	Scarborough	Scarborough—Agincourt	former Budget Chief; Executive At-Large Member
Norm Kelly	40	Scarborough	Scarborough—Agincourt	Deputy Mayor; Parks and Environment Chair; Chair of the Executive Committee (appointed by City Council on Monday, November 18)
Chin Lee	41	Scarborough	Scarborough—Rouge River	
Raymond Cho	42	Scarborough	Scarborough—Rouge River	
Paul Ainslie	43	Scarborough	Scarborough East	Toronto Public Library Board Chair, Toronto Zoo Vice-Chair
Ron Moeser	44	Scarborough	Scarborough East	

== See also ==
- 2010 budget of the municipal government of Toronto
