= Responsible Government Group =

Toronto City Council caucus

- Leader: None
- Members: Karen Stintz; Case Ootes; David Shiner; Peter Milczyn; John Parker; Chin Lee; Frances Nunziata; Cesar Palacio; Cliff Jenkins; Brian Ashton; Michael Feldman; Michael Del Grande; Denzil Minnan-Wong
- Founded: March 2009
- Dissolved: 2010
- Ideology: Responsible government Conservatism
- Political position: Centre-right

The Responsible Government Group was a caucus of centre-right Toronto City Councillors who formed an unofficial opposition to then Toronto Mayor David Miller and his mostly left-wing supporters on council in the last two years of Miller's final term.

The group was launched in March 2009 and included Karen Stintz, Case Ootes, David Shiner, Peter Milczyn, John Parker, Chin Lee, Frances Nunziata, Cesar Palacio, Cliff Jenkins, Brian Ashton, Michael Feldman, Michael Del Grande and Denzil Minnan-Wong. The group was led by Stintz and Ootes.

Several other right-wing councillors, most notably Rob Ford and Doug Holyday, never joined the group.

In the summer of 2009 the RGG was critical of Mayor Miller's handling of the 2009 City of Toronto inside and outside workers strike and announced that it would be voting against ratification of the settlement between Miller and the striking CUPE locals.

The RGG was not active as an organized entity during the 2010 election and did not issue a campaign platform or run candidates.

Following the election, in which conservative Rob Ford was elected mayor, a number of former RGG members were appointed to senior positions in Ford's administration.
