= 2010 Toronto municipal election =

2010 municipal election in Toronto, Ontario, Canada

- October 25, 2010
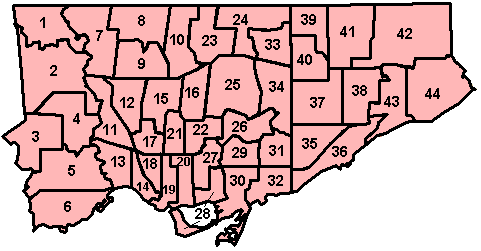
- The ward boundaries for the 2010 election. The Mayor and French school board trustees are elected across the city, councillors in their respective wards, and English public and Catholic trustees on a ward or dual-ward basis.

Municipal elections were held on October 25, 2010 to elect a mayor and 44 city councillors in Toronto, Ontario, Canada. In addition, school trustees were elected to the Toronto District School Board, Toronto Catholic District School Board, Conseil scolaire de district du Centre-Sud-Ouest and Conseil scolaire de district catholique Centre-Sud. The election was held in conjunction with those held in other municipalities in the province of Ontario (see 2010 Ontario municipal elections). Candidate registration opened on January 4, 2010 and ended on September 10. Advance polls were open October 5, 6, 7, 8 and 12, 13, 16 and 17.

There were a number of open seats as two sitting councillors, Rob Ford and Joe Pantalone, ran for mayor, while incumbents Case Ootes, Kyle Rae, Adam Giambrone, Michael Walker, Mike Feldman, Brian Ashton, and Howard Moscoe did not seek re-election. This was the first election to take place in Toronto since the enactment of a new fund raising by-law whereby unions and corporations could not donate to candidates. The nomination period for the 2010 municipal election opened on Monday, January 4, 2010 and closed on Friday, September 10, 2010.

In the 2010 election, a record number of women was elected to council, with 15 female councillors comprising exactly one third of all council members.

With this election, voting day moved to the fourth Monday of October from the second Monday of November which had been election day since 1978.

== Mayor ==
The mayor's seat was open for the first time since the 2003 Toronto election, due to the announcement by incumbent mayor David Miller that he would not seek a third term in office. At the end of the campaign there were three major candidates who were included by the media in public opinion polls and mayoral debates: winner Rob Ford, Joe Pantalone, and George Smitherman. Four other candidates, Rocco Rossi, Sarah Thomson, Adam Giambrone and Giorgio Mammoliti, were considered major candidates when they launched their campaigns but later dropped out of the campaign.

== City council ==
City councillors were elected to represent Toronto's 44 wards at Toronto City Council. There were a number of open seats, as sitting councillors Joe Pantalone and Rob Ford chose to run for mayor, while long-serving incumbents Case Ootes, Kyle Rae, Adam Giambrone, Mike Feldman, Michael Walker, Brian Ashton and Howard Moscoe announced their retirements.

Five incumbent councillors were defeated, in wards 1, 13, 25, 32, and 35:. Vincent Crisanti beat Suzan Hall, Sarah Doucette beat Bill Saundercook, Jaye Robinson beat Cliff Jenkins, Mary-Margaret McMahon beat Sandra Bussin, and Michelle Berardinetti beat Adrian Heaps respectively.

== School boards ==
School trustees were elected to the Toronto District School Board, Toronto Catholic District School Board, Conseil scolaire de district du Centre-Sud-Ouest and Conseil scolaire de district catholique Centre-Sud.

== Participation initiatives ==
Continuing a tradition established by City Idol in 2006, grassroots activist groups established a number of initiatives to encourage greater interest and participation in municipal politics.

One notable initiative in 2010 was Better Ballots, an advocacy group which sponsored a debate concerning municipal voting reform on June 1. Preparations for that debate included an online ballot to name two of the "minor" mayoral candidates to the debate panel, in addition to the six "major" ones. The winners of the online vote were Rocco Achampong and Keith Cole. When Giorgio Mammoliti withdrew from the mayoral race on July 5, he singled out Achampong as a candidate who "needs to be heard", and asked the media to give Achampong his former space in the debates.

Another initiative was So You Think You Can Council, an event hosted by comedian Maggie Cassella which featured Ward 27's council candidates answering questions about Toronto's municipal government in a game show format.

== Satire ==
The campaign was also noted for the creation of two mock campaigns which posted satirical comments on the election through social networking platforms. Murray4Mayor was spearheaded by National Post cartoonist Steve Murray, while The Rebel Mayor, which was eventually revealed as the creation of journalist Shawn Micallef, was written in the persona of 19th century Toronto mayor William Lyon Mackenzie.

== Ward 9 York Centre and TDSB Ward 4 election irregularities ==
On March 29, 2011, a judge of the Ontario Superior Court of Justice invalidated the election results for Ward 9 and TDSB Ward 4 because of "several “irregularities” in the voters list". The civil lawsuit was brought forward by Gus Cusimano. He lost by 89 votes and was the runner-up. There were missing signatures of electoral officers on 426 of 1,143 forms that allowed election-day changes to the voter list.

Initially the city's legal staff said they would be appealing the decision but on May 13 it was announced that the city would not launch an appeal. City Clerk, Uli Watkiss said in a statement, "The decision to proceed with a by-election and resolve this matter as quickly as possible is in the best interest of the public, the individuals directly affected, and the workings of Council." The mayor's office supported the decision. Rob Ford's press secretary Adrienne Batra said, "Obviously the mayor supported (Cusimano) during the general election and once the by-election gets under way he will be fully supporting him again."

On May 16, Maria Augimeri announced that she would be appealing the decision herself. She said the by-election would cost $525,000. (Note: The cost of the ward 9 by-election is estimated at $175,000. The court decision also affected a school trustee election and that election would cost $350,000 since it spans two wards.) She said, "The clerk’s advice not to appeal does harm to taxpayers as well as to the integrity of our electoral system." On August 4, the city reversed its decision and decided to join the appeal which will be held in September 2011. On December 19, the court ruled in Augimeri's favour. A three judge panel ruled that although 300 ballots were unsigned by electoral officers the people voting were very likely eligible to vote and that this would have no effect on the election. In a related judgement, they also ruled that Cusimano incorrectly voted in the Ward 9 election because he lived in another riding. They decided that no further action was necessary.

== Ward 1: Etobicoke North ==
Ward 1
Candidate	Votes	%
Vincent Crisanti	5,505	40.736%
Suzan Hall	4,996	36.969%
Omar Farouk	1,573	11.64%
Sharad Sharma	883	6.534%
Ted Berger	388	2.871%
Peter D'Gama	169	1.251%
Total	13,514	100%

- Ted Berger (registered March 23)
- Vincent Crisanti elected (registered June 15)
- Peter D'Gama (registered July 20)
- Omar Farouk (registered June 8)
- Suzan Hall (incumbent) (registered January 4) Hall was running for re-election and had been on city council since 2000. Prior to that she was a school trustee.
- Sharad Sharma (registered February 5)

== Ward 2: Etobicoke North ==
Ward 2
Candidate	Votes	%
Doug Ford	12,660	71.679%
Cadigia Ali	2,346	13.283%
Luciano Rizzuti	828	4.688%
Rajinder Lall	736	4.167%
Andrew Saikaley	637	3.607%
Jason Pedlar	455	2.576%
Total	17,662	100%

The seat was open because incumbent Rob Ford ran for mayor.

- Cadigia Ali (registered June 4) Ali was the runner-up in this ward in the last election. She is a health professional (Rexdale Community Health Centre) and activist (Etobicoke Conflict Mediation Team).
- Doug Ford elected(registered August 9) Doug Ford, 45, is Rob Ford's brother and campaign manager. He is president of Deco Labels, a family owned business founded by his father.
- Rajinder Lall (registered July 27); Etobicoke real estate broker
- Jason Pedlar (registered June 18); mediator with the Financial Services Commission of Ontario
- Luciano Rizzuti (registered September 10)
- Andrew Saikaley (registered April 13); transportation consultant

== Ward 3: Etobicoke Centre ==
Ward 3
Candidate	Votes	%
Doug Holyday	13,521	71.92%
Peter Kudryk	2,684	14.277%
Ross Vaughan	1,585	8.431%
Roger Deschenes	1,010	5.372%
Total	18,800	100%

- Roger Deschenes (registered April 26) Roger Deschenes, a candidate for Ward 3 in the 2010 Toronto elections, has lived his entire life in the city of Toronto. Deschenes was raised in downtown Toronto and has lived in Ward 3 for the past 22 years. Previously self-employed in the food industry, Deschenes also has years of experience in construction.
- Doug Holyday elected (incumbent) (registered June 30) Holyday has been councillor since 1998. He was Etobicoke City Councillor (1986–1994) and mayor (1994–1997), and Metro Toronto councillor (1994–1997).
- Peter Kudryk (registered March 22)

== Ward 4: Etobicoke Centre ==
Ward 4
Candidate	Votes	%
Gloria Lindsay Luby	9,789	46.902%
John Campbell	9,480	45.422%
Daniel Bertolini	1,602	7.676%
Total	20,871	100%

- Daniel Bertolini (registered September 10)
- John Campbell (registered July 8)
- Gloria Lindsay Luby elected (incumbent) (registered March 8) Luby was a school trustee before being elected to Etobicoke city council. She was elected to Toronto City Council in 1997 when the Etobicoke was amalgamated into the new city of Toronto.

== Ward 5: Etobicoke—Lakeshore ==
Ward 5
Candidate	Votes	%
Peter Milczyn	9,778	41.16%
Justin Di Ciano	9,669	40.701%
Morley Kells	2,725	11.471%
John Chiappetta	1,245	5.241%
Rob Therrien	339	1.427%
Total	23,756	100%

- John Chiappetta (registered September 10)
- Justin Di Ciano (registered July 12)
- Morley Kells (registered September 8) Kells was an Etobicoke councillor and Controller in the 1970s and then served as Progressive Conservative MPP from 1981 to 1985 and again from 1995 to 2003. He was Minister of the Environment in Frank Miller's short-lived government.
- Peter Milczyn elected (incumbent) (registered January 14) First elected in 1994 to Etobicoke City Council. Defeated in 1997 in the first post-amalgamation election. Elected to Toronto City Council in 2000.
- Rob Thierrien (registered September 10)

== Ward 6: Etobicoke—Lakeshore ==
Ward 6
Candidate	Votes	%
Mark Grimes	12,228	60.421%
Jem Cain	5,847	28.891%
Michael Laxer	717	3.543%
Wendell Brereton	605	2.989%
Cecilia Luu	466	2.303%
David Searle	375	1.853%
Total	20,238	100%

- Wendell Brereton (registered August 4) A pastor who describes himself as a fundamentalist Christian, Brereton was a candidate for mayor but withdrew in July to endorse Rob Ford. Brereton, a former officer with the Ontario Provincial Police, is a social conservative who opposes same-sex marriage. He supports government stimulus spending to combat the recession.
- Jem Cain (registered January 4) Cain was also a candidate in the 2006 municipal election.
- Mark Grimes elected (incumbent) (registered August 11) A former trader on the Toronto Stock Exchange, Grimes was first elected to Toronto City Council in 2003.
- Michael Laxer (registered July 2) Laxer is a local used book store owner and community activist and a former candidate for the New Democratic Party at both the federal and provincial level.
- David Searle (registered August 31) Searle, who describes himself as a Red Tory, and also ran for council in the 2003 municipal election and opposes the entwining of church and state. He is a supporter of the Ontario Progressive Conservative Party and is a moderate on social issues.

== Ward 7: York West ==
Ward 7
Candidate	Votes	%
Giorgio Mammoliti	5,338	43.797%
Nick Di Nizio	3,601	29.545%
Victor Lucero	1,038	8.517%
Sergio Gizzo	706	5.793%
Sharon Joseph	547	4.488%
Chris MacDonald	491	4.029%
Larry Perlman	249	2.043%
Scott Aitchison	129	1.058%
Stefano Tesoro	89	0.73%
Total	12,188	100%

- Scott Aitchison (registered January 13)
- Nick Di Nizio (registered January 18)
- Sergio Gizzo (registered February 16)
- Sharon Joseph (registered January 15)
- Victor Lucero (registered January 21)
- Christopher MacDonald (registered July 26)
- Giorgio Mammoliti elected (incumbent) (registered July 9) Mammoliti is a former MPP and has represented York West on city council for 15 years. He was a candidate for mayor of Toronto this year but withdrew and sought re-election as a councillor. Formerly an NDPer, he is now considered to be right of centre.
- Larry Perlman (registered January 8)
- Stefano Tesoro (registered January 8)

== Ward 8: York West ==
Ward 8
Candidate	Votes	%
Anthony Perruzza	4,724	41.464%
Peter Li Preti	4,372	38.374%
Antonius Clarke	1,487	13.052%
Arthur Smitherman	268	2.352%
Naseeb Husain	243	2.133%
John Gallagher	129	1.132%
Ramnarine Tiwari	117	1.027%
Gerardo Miniguano	53	0.465%
Total	11,393	100%

- Antonius Clarke (registered February 1)
- John Gallagher (registered September 9)
- Naseeb Husain (registered March 26) Naseeb Husain a resident of ward 8 since 1989 became a candidate due to the lack of active local engagement with the city to better his neighborhood.
- Peter Li Preti (registered May 3) Li Preti was the city councillor for this ward for 21 years until his defeat in the last election by Perruzza, whom he sought to unseat. He has a doctorate in clinical psychology.
- Gerardo Miniguano (registered February 4)
- Anthony Perruzza elected (incumbent) (registered January 14) Peruzza was a North York city councillor in the 1980s and an NDP MPP in the 1990s. Elected to Toronto City Council in 2006 defeating incumbent Peter Li Preti by 579 votes, he serves on the Toronto Transit Commission and Toronto Community Housing board.
- Arthur Smitherman (registered September 2) Arthur Smitherman, 54, is a truck driver and the estranged elder brother of mayoral candidate George Smitherman and supported Rob Ford's candidacy for mayor.
- Ramnarine Tiwari (registered April 27)

== Ward 9: York Centre ==
Ward 9
Candidate	Votes	%
Maria Augimeri	5,452	44.332%
Gus Cusimano	5,363	43.609%
Gianfranco Amendola	1,082	8.798%
Wilson Basantes	259	2.106%
Stefano Picone	142	1.155%
Total	12,298	100%

- Gianfranco Amendola (registered July 9)
- Maria Augimeri elected (incumbent) (registered March 11) First elected to North York City Council in 1985 and then to the new Toronto City Council in 1997. A social anthropologist by training.
- Wilson Basante (registered January 4)
- Gus Cusimano (registered August 25)
- Stefano Picone (registered August 26)

== Ward 10: York Centre ==
Ward 10
Candidate	Votes	%
James Pasternak	3,159	19.156%
Nancy Oomen	2,777	16.839%
Brian Shifman	2,632	15.96%
Igor Toutchinski	2,605	15.796%
Konstantin Toubis	1,887	11.443%
Magda Gondor Berkovits	935	5.67%
Jarred Friedman	850	5.154%
Joseph Cohen	535	3.244%
Eric Plant	355	2.153%
Edward Zaretsky	326	1.977%
Robert Freedland	244	1.48%
Drago Banovic	186	1.128%
Total	16,491	100%

Incumbent Mike Feldman did not run for re-election.

- Drago Banovic (registered September 9)
- Joseph Cohen (registered August 23)
- Robert Freedland (registered September 9)
- Jarred Friedman (registered July 29)
- Magda Gondor Berkovits (registered January 4) Gondor Berkovits managed the constituency office of a federal Member of Parliament before becoming a businessperson. A former president of the Ontario Women's Liberal Commission, she was a candidate for Ward Ten in the 2006 election.
- Nancy Oomen (registered August 4) Oomen was retiring councillor Michael Feldman's executive assistant and is an advocate of ward beautification projects.
- James Pasternak elected (registered January 15) Pasternak was the school trustee for the ward prior to this election.
- Eric Plant (registered April 7)
- Brian Shifman (registered May 26)
- Konstantin Toubis (registered March 30)
- Igor Toutchinski (registered July 14)
- Edward Zaretsky (registered January 28)

== Ward 11: York South—Weston ==
Ward 11
Candidate	Votes	%
Frances Nunziata	10,544	66.789%
Fulvio Sansone	2,290	14.506%
Leo Marshall	1,718	10.882%
Abdi Hashised	1,235	7.823%
Total	15,787	100%

- Abdi Hashised (registered May 4)
- Leo Marshall (registered January 5)
- Frances Nunziata elected (incumbent) (registered January 7) Nunziata, the last mayor of the old, pre-amalgamation City of York, has been a member of Toronto city council since 1997.
- Fulvio Sansone (registered June 10)

== Ward 12: York South—Weston ==
Ward 12
Candidate	Votes	%
Frank Di Giorgio	3,636	27.056%
Nick Dominelli	3,214	23.915%
Steve Tasses	2,748	20.448%
Vilma Filici	2,204	16.4%
Richard Gosling	1,073	7.984%
Joe Renda	343	2.552%
Angelo Bellavia	221	1.644%
Total	13,439	100%

- Angelo Bellavia (registered January 4)
- Frank Di Giorgio elected (incumbent) (registered March 22) Di Giorgio was a North York city councillor from 1985 to 1997 when he was elected to Toronto city council in the first post-amalgamation election.
- Nick Dominelli (registered March 2)
- Vilma Filici (registered June 11) Filici was president of the Canadian Hispanic Congress for seven years.
- Richard Gosling (registered August 31)
- Joe Renda (registered July 26)
- Steve Tasses (registered January 18)

== Ward 13: Parkdale—High Park ==
Ward 13
Candidate	Votes	%
Sarah Doucette	10,100	47.045%
Bill Saundercook	7,893	36.765%
Nick Pavlov	2,109	9.823%
Redmond Weissenberger	1,139	5.305%
Jackelyn Van Altenberg	228	1.062%
Total	21,469	100%

- Sarah Doucette elected (registered January 4)
- Nick Pavlov (registered September 9) A local real estate agent.
- Bill Saundercook (incumbent) (registered January 4) A former City of York alderman, and deputy mayor of York, Saundercook was an unsuccessful candidate for the provincial Liberal nomination in 1996. In 1997, he was elected to Toronto city council but was defeated in 2000 by future mayor David Miller who he had to run against due to redistricting. He returned to city council in 2003 after Miller vacated the seat to run for mayor. He was defeated by Sarah Doucette in 2010.
- Jackelyn Van Altenberg (registered March 30)
- Redmond Weissenberger (registered April 16) Director at Ludwig von Mises Institute of Canada, a libertarian think tank.

== Ward 14: Parkdale—High Park ==
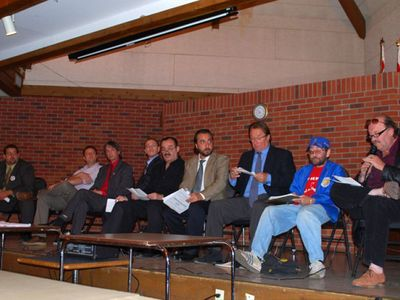
Ward 14 council hopefuls at an all candidates meeting in Parkdale

Ward 14
Candidate	Votes	%
Gord Perks	8,542	51.811%
Ryan Hobson	2,798	16.971%
Michael Erickson	2,434	14.763%
Bill Vrebosch	668	4.052%
Cullen Simpson	531	3.221%
Gus Koutoumanos	529	3.209%
Barry Hubick	342	2.074%
Jules-José Kerlinger	331	2.008%
István Tar	177	1.074%
Jimmy Talpa	135	0.819%
Total	16,487	100%

- Michael Erickson (registered July 2) Erickson is a high school teacher and Parkdale resident who campaigned on a platform of supporting children and youth, strengthening public transit and support for the arts, increasing transparency and accountability at City Hall, and stimulating small and home business. He was Co-chair of the Lesbian Gay Bi Trans Youth Line from 2006 to 2010, and was a committee member of the Metro Network for Social Justice.
- Ryan Hobson (registered May 19) A single father who campaigned on better Transit for Torontonians, empowering tenants, and affordable housing. He made the eradication of bed bugs a key aspect of his platform. Hobson's commitment to the arts received the highest mark from ArtsVote Toronto of all the challenging candidates. Hobson was involved in federal politics and advocated for greater collaboration among all levels of government.
- Barry Hubick (registered August 25) Operates a www cafe on Queen St. W.
- Jules-José Kerlinger (registered February 22) First time candidate, ran in a model parliament for youth.
- Gus Koutoumanos (registered August 30) An owner of Shox The Local Option on Dundas St. W. Was opposed to the longtime temperance movement that kept The Junction dry until the late 1990s.
- Gord Perks elected (incumbent) (registered January 4) Perks was first elected in 2006. Prior to his election he was a senior campaigner with the Toronto Environmental Alliance, Greenpeace Canada and the Better Transportation Coalition.
- Cullen Simpson (registered August 18) Also from Parkdale, nearby Mimico is also fed up with the increasing gun violence faced by the community.
- Jimmy Talpa (registered February 11) Longtime Parkdale labour activist.
- István Tar (registered March 26) Hungarian born Poet Dissident.
- Bill Vrebosch (registered January 21) Bill Vrebosch is part of a political family, the son of long-serving Northern Ontario mayor Bill Vrebosch. He promises to better "represent the people to city hall rather than representing city hall to the people".

== Ward 15: Eglinton—Lawrence ==
Ward 15
Candidate	Votes	%
Josh Colle	6,668	40.375%
Rob Davis	5,399	32.691%
Ron Singer	2,275	13.775%
Tony Evangelista	1,173	7.103%
Giuseppe Pede	472	2.858%
Eva Tavares	464	2.81%
William Reitsma	64	0.388%
Total	16,515	100%

Long-time incumbent Howard Moscoe did not seek re-election.

- Josh Colle elected (registered June 15) Colle is the son of provincial cabinet minister Michael Colle and has been endorsed by Howard Moscoe, the ward's retiring councillor, and by former mayor Mel Lastman. Colle is a former Catholic School Board trustee and is an executive at an energy and infrastructure firm. He is involved with the Five Points Community Action committee.
- Rob Davis (registered January 4) Rob Davis is a Separate School Board trustee and was a member of the City of York city council from 1991 to 1997 and Toronto city council from 1997 to 2000 when he was defeated by Joe Mihevc. He was a Progressive Conservative candidate in the 1995 provincial election and attempted to return to city council in 2003 but was defeated in Ward 33 by Shelley Carroll, He ran in this election on a law and order platform.
- Tony Evangelista (registered September 3)
- Giuseppe Pede (registered August 20)
- William Reitsma (registered July 21)
- Ron Singer (registered February 11) Singer is opposed to the proposed Lawrence Heights redevelopment plan Mayoral candidate Rob Ford endorsed Singer. This was Singer's third attempt to win the seat, in 2006 he won 25% of the vote, placing second to Howard Moscoe.
- Eva Tavares (registered September 7)

== Ward 16: Eglinton—Lawrence ==
Ward 16
Candidate	Votes	%
Karen Stintz	11,607	60.763%
Terry Mills	4,243	22.212%
Michael Coll	1,799	9.418%
Roy Macdonald	1,453	7.607%
Total	19,102	100%

- Michael Coll (registered July 2) Coll is an executive board member for Durham Region Labour Council. In 2007 he ran from Sudbury to Toronto in an event called mikesrunforsickkids.com to raise money for the Hospital for Sick Children in Toronto. He was endorsed by the 189,000 members of the Toronto and York Region Labour Council.
- Roy MacDonald (registered April 22)
- Terry Mills (registered March 11) Mills is an urban planner and the past-president of the Confederation of Resident & Ratepayer Associations and is active with the Federation of North Toronto Residents' Associations. He was endorsed by Councillor Michael Walker.
- Karen Stintz elected (incumbent) (registered January 14) Stintz was first elected to city council in 2003 when she unseated Anne Johnston. A Progressive Conservative, she has been an opponent of Mayor Miller and is a leader of the right-leaning Responsible Government Group on council.

== Ward 17: Davenport ==
Ward 17
Candidate	Votes	%
Cesar Palacio	6,154	42.813%
Jonah Schein	4,827	33.581%
Tony Letra	2,035	14.158%
Ben Stirpe	751	5.225%
Maria Marques	388	2.699%
Brian Bragason	125	0.87%
Kar Rasaiah	94	0.654%
Total	14,374	100%

- Brian Bragason (registered September 10)
- Tony Letra (registered June 15)
- Maria Marques (registered September 10)
- Cesar Palacio elected (incumbent) (registered January 4) Palacio has been a city councillor since 2003.
- Kar Rasaiah (registered September 9)
- Jonah Schein (registered July 23) Schein is a longtime community worker in Davenport, working at the Stop Community Food Centre at 1881 Davenport. Schein founded the Civic Engagement Program there, and ran the widely lauded "Do the Math" campaign to raise social assistance rates in Ontario. Shein was endorsed by city councillors Shelley Carroll, Gord Perks and Adam Vaughan, Alejandra Bravo, who came within 300 votes of unseating Palacio in 2006, and environmentalist Wayne Roberts. He was subsequently elected as Davenport's new provincial MPP in the 2011 provincial election.
- Ben Stirpe (registered September 10) Stirpe is a University of Toronto (U of T) alumnus who studied Political Science and History. While at U of T, he was a member of the debating team, and was a Vice President in Student Government, where among other accomplishments, he successfully lobbied the TTC to lower student fares. Stirpe hasworked for a City of Toronto agency and was employed for over 10 years at a downtown hospital where he experienced union negotiations, realized efficiencies, and won numerous customer service awards. Stirpe endorsed Rob Ford for Mayor. www.voteBenSTIRPEward17.ca

== Ward 18: Davenport ==
Ward 18
Candidate	Votes	%
Ana Bailão	6,277	43.754%
Kevin Beaulieu	4,911	34.233%
Frank de Jong	869	6.057%
Hema Vyas	776	5.409%
Joe MacDonald	669	4.663%
Kirk Russell	326	2.272%
Nha Le	154	1.073%
Ken Wood	106	0.739%
Mohammad Muhit	94	0.655%
Joanna Teliatnik	70	0.488%
Doug Carroll	52	0.362%
Abdirazak Elmi	42	0.293%
Total	14,346	100%

Incumbent Adam Giambrone dropped out of the mayor's race on February 10 and subsequently announced he would not run for re-election in Ward 18.

- Ana Bailão elected (registered January 27) Bailão was the runner-up to Giambrone in the 2003 election and was executive assistant to former councillor Mario Silva. She became president of the Working Women Community Centre in 2007.
- Kevin Beaulieu (registered April 28) Beaulieu is a longtime Ward 18 resident, community activist and former executive assistant to councillor and TTC chair Adam Giambrone. Beaulieu was the only candidate for council to have been endorsed by Mayor David Miller. Beaulieu received wide-ranging endorsements, from residents groups, student leaders, city councillors and incumbent school trustee Maria Rodriguez. Following the election he went on to work as executive assistant to councillor Kristyn Wong-Tam, before becoming executive director of Toronto's Pride Week in 2011.
- Doug Carroll (registered May 27)
- Frank de Jong (registered April 23) De Jong is a school teacher and was leader of the Green Party of Ontario from 1993 to 2009.
- Abdirazak Elmi (registered July 14)
- Nha Le (registered January 5)
- Joe MacDonald (registered June 7)
- Mohammad Muhit (registered June 11)
- Kirk Russell (registered April 28)
- Joanna Teliatnik (registered September 9)
- Hema Vyas (registered February 9) Vyes is a former president of June Callwood Centre for Women and Families.
- Ken Wood (registered September 10)

== Ward 19: Trinity—Spadina ==
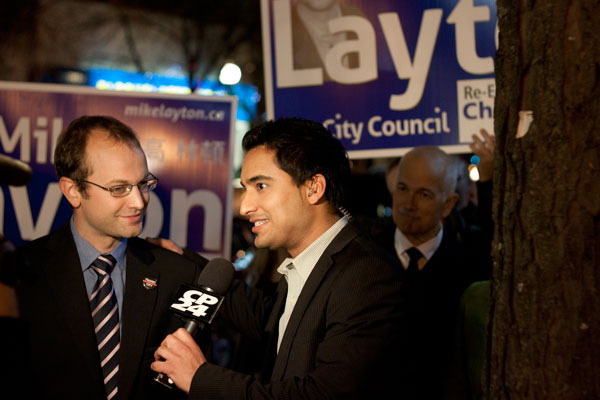
Mike Layton being interviewed by a television reporter on election night.

Ward 19
Candidate	Votes	%
Mike Layton	9,125	45.387%
Karen Sun	4,207	20.925%
Sean McCormick	3,650	18.155%
Jim Likourezos	1,313	6.531%
David Footman	518	2.576%
Karlene Nation	417	2.074%
Rosario Bruto	398	1.98%
George Sawision	356	1.771%
Jason Stevens	121	0.602%
Total	20,105	100%

Open seat as incumbent Joe Pantalone ran for mayor.

- Rosario Bruto (registered September 9)
- David Footman (registered May 27)
- Daniel Iaboni (registered February 8)
- Mike Layton elected (registered March 5) Layton is the son of federal New Democratic Party leader and former Ward 30 councillor Jack Layton. He has been endorsed by outgoing councillor Joe Pantalone.
- Jim Likourezos (registered January 15
- Sean McCormick (registered May 6) McCormick hosts Sportsnet Connected on Rogers Sportsnet and campaigned against waste at city hall. He was endorsed by John Tory, Case Ootes (Councillor Ward 29), Mike Feldman (Councillor Ward 10), Paul Christie (former TTC Commissioner, Toronto District School Board Supervisor) and Fred Dominelli (Councillor Ward 17). He has been quoted as saying "Smarter spending of Torontonians tax dollars needs to be the number one priority for the next city council. A better Toronto starts with a better return for the tax payer."
- Karlene Nation (registered September 10) Nation is a reporter with CTV News and ran as a "right of centre" candidate.
- George Sawision (registered June 14)
- Jason Stevens (registered June 28)
- Karen Sun (registered January 4) Sun has been executive director of the Chinese Canadian National Council Toronto Chapter since 2006 and was on "Better Ballots"' list of candidates to watch. She has sat on the boards of Heritage Toronto and the Working Women Community Centre. She was endorsed by Judy Rebick, Spacing Magazine co-founder David Meslin, Tam Goossen, Winnie Ng, former Ward 19 candidate Derek Chadbourne, Darren O'Donnell, Kathryn Holloway and Wavelength Music Arts Projects co-founder Jonny Dovercourt. She was also endorsed by the Toronto Star.

== Ward 20: Trinity—Spadina ==
Ward 20
Candidate	Votes	%
Adam Vaughan	16,486	74.523%
Mike Yen	3,601	16.278%
Dean Maher	1,233	5.574%
Roman Polochansky	487	2.201%
Ken Osadchuk	315	1.424%
Total	22,122	100%

- Dean Maher (registered January 11)
- Ken Osadchuk (registered March 31)
- Roman Polochansky (registered September 3)
- Adam Vaughan elected (incumbent) (registered January 25) Vaughan was a political journalist for 20 years for CBC and then Citytv before being elected to city council in 2006. A member of council's progressive wing, he sits on Planning and Growth Management Committee, Affordable Housing Action Committee, The Toronto Arts Council, The Police Services Board and other committees and is also the Vice Chair of The Toronto and East York Community Council. He is the son of the late Colin Vaughan, former Citytv reporter, architect, Toronto City and Metro Councillor.
- Mike Yen (registered June 4)

== Ward 21: St. Paul's ==
Ward 21
Candidate	Votes	%
Joe Mihevc	9,824	56.246%
Shimmy Posen	5,328	30.505%
Peter Nolan	921	5.273%
Beth McLellan	644	3.687%
Alex Freedman	454	2.599%
Marius Frederick	295	1.689%
Total	17,466	100%

- Marius Frederick (registered May 17)
- Alex Freedman (registered May 12)
- Beth McLellan (registered September 3 )
- Joe Mihevc elected (incumbent) (registered January 4) Mihevc has sat on Toronto city council since the 1997 amalgamation election and had previously sat on the old city of York's council. An NDPer, he is vice-chair of the Toronto Transit Commission.
- Peter Nolan (registered March 31)
- Shimmy Posen (registered June 22)

== Ward 22: St. Paul's ==
Ward 22
Candidate	Votes	%
Josh Matlow	11,892	52.392%
Chris Sellors	8,037	35.408%
Elizabeth Cook	1,900	8.371%
William Molls	869	3.829%
Total	22,698	100%

Incumbent Michael Walker did not run for re-election.

- Elizabeth Cook (registered September 10)
- Josh Matlow elected (registered January 4) Matlow had been the area's school trustee since 2003.
- William Molls (registered April 30) Molls is a recent Ryerson University graduate.
- Chris Sellors (registered March 11) Sellors is the former executive assistant to Councillor Walker.

== Ward 23: Willowdale ==
Ward 23
Candidate	Votes	%
John Filion	13,666	65.857%
Dusan Kralik	2,456	11.836%
Peter Clarke	2,129	10.26%
John Whyte	1,445	6.964%
Charles Sutherland	1,055	5.084%
Total	20,751	100%

- Peter Clarke (registered September 7)
- John Filion elected (incumbent) (registered January 6) Filion was chair of the North York Board of Education from 1987 to 1990 when he was elected to North York city council. He joined Toronto city council in 1997 as a result of amalgamation. He is chair of the city's Board of Health.
- Dusan Kralik (registered July 5)
- Charles Sutherland (registered September 8)
- John Whyte (registered May 7)

== Ward 24: Willowdale ==
Ward 24
Candidate	Votes	%
David Shiner	10,523	58.387%
Sonny Cho	4,986	27.665%
Eugene Loo	1,611	8.939%
Bob Nahiddi	903	5.01%
Total	18,023	100%

- Sonny Cho (registered March 9)
- Eugene Loo (registered July 15)
- Bob Nahiddi (registered August 23)
- David Shiner elected (incumbent) (registered September 7) He was first elected to North York city council in 1991 and has served on Toronto council since 1997. He was a close ally of former mayor Mel Lastman and served as the city's budget chief until Lastman left office in 2003. Son of the late Esther Shiner, former North York alderman, member of the North York Board of Control.

== Ward 25 Don Valley West ==
Ward 25
Candidate	Votes	%
Jaye Robinson	9,258	45.494%
Cliff Jenkins	8,756	43.027%
Joanne Dickins	1,968	9.671%
Tanya Hostler	368	1.808%
Total	20,350	100%

- Tasha Batt (registered January 7)
- Joanne Dickins (registered August 25)
- Tanya Hostler (registered September 10)
- Cliff Jenkins (incumbent) (registered February 1) The former president of the York Mills Ratepayers Association had been on city council since 2003 and is a member of the conservative Responsible Government Group.
- Jaye Robinson elected (registered May 25)

== Ward 26: Don Valley West ==
Ward 26
Candidate	Votes	%
John Parker	6,203	31.278%
Jon Burnside	5,788	29.185%
Mohamed Dhanani	5,627	28.373%
Yunus Pandor	1,452	7.322%
Tanvir Ahmed	377	1.901%
Shaukat Malik	216	1.089%
Nawab Salim Khan	169	0.852%
Total	19,832	100%

- Tanvir Ahmed (registered June 17)
- Jon Burnside (registered January 22) Burnside is a former police officer, involved with house league hockey in the ward and is the ex-husband of comedian Carla Collins. He was endorsed by former Ontario PC leader, John Tory.
- Mohamed Dhanani (registered February 26) Dhanani was the runner-up in the 2006 election.
- Nawab Salim Khan (registered July 29)
- Shaukat Malik (registered June 14)
- Yunus Pandor (registered July 12)
- John Parker elected (incumbent) (registered January 4) Parker was the area's Progressive Conservative MPP at Queen's Park from 1995 to 1999. He was first elected to Toronto city council in 2006 with approximately 20% of the vote.

== Ward 27: Toronto Centre ==
Ward 27
Candidate	Votes	%
Kristyn Wong-Tam	7,527	28.277%
Ken Chan	7,065	26.541%
Chris Tindal	3,447	12.949%
Simon Wookey	2,128	7.994%
Joel Dick	1,667	6.262%
Robert Meynell	1,223	4.594%
Enza Anderson	1,127	4.234%
Ella Rebanks	838	3.148%
Ben Bergen	380	1.428%
Susan Gapka	367	1.379%
Gary Leroux	283	1.063%
Paul Spence	243	0.913%
Jonas Jemstone	142	0.533%
Ram Narula	108	0.406%
Perry Missal	74	0.278%
Total	26,619	100%

Veteran councillor Kyle Rae, who held a seat on council since 1991, announced that he would not be running for re-election.

- Enza Anderson (registered January 20) Anderson, a well-known local transgender personality, was a candidate for Mayor of Toronto in the 2000 election, and a candidate for Ward 27 councillor in the 2003 election finishing second to Rae.
- Ben Bergen (registered September 10) Bergen is completing a degree in political science and economics at the University of Toronto. His platform included proposals for a congestion tax to fund transit expansion and bike paths to reduce pollution and traffic. Bergen also supported building more public spaces in Ward 27, such as a summertime boardwalk on Church Street.
- Ken Chan (registered February 23) Chan is a former Peel Regional Police officer who later served in the offices of then Health Minister George Smitherman and London (England) Mayor Boris Johnson as a policy advisor. He was endorsed by outgoing councillor Kyle Rae, school board trustees Sheila Ward and Nadia Bello, Ryerson University President Sheldon Levy, Don Valley West MP Rob Oliphant, councillors Case Ootes and Karen Stintz, former Liberal provincial ministers Bob Wong and Charles Beer, former NDP provincial minister Andrew Thomson, prominent constitutional lawyer Douglas Elliott, and former Principal Secretary to Mike Harris Stewart Braddick. He campaigned on investing in the arts community.
- Joel Dick (registered February 3) Dick is a lawyer and community activist. He was a candidate for Ward 14 (Toronto Centre) Toronto District School Board Trustee in the 2006 election and is active with the New Democratic Party. He is endorsed by federal NDP candidate for Toronto Centre Susan Wallace, former provincial NDP candidate for Toronto Centre Helen Breslauer, CUPE 4400 and the Central Ontario Building Trades union.
- Susan Gapka (registered January 21) Gapka serves on the executive of the Ontario New Democratic Party as an LGBT representative and is a local Trans advocate and past candidate for council.
- Matthew Over (registered September 9)
- Jonas Jemstone (registered September 9)
- Robert Meynell (registered April 6) Meynell is the author of Canadian Idealism and the Philosophy of Freedom. McGill-Queen's University Press, 2011. He is a government relations associate at March of Dimes Canada and a lecturer in politics at Trent University and a successful real estate investor. He was endorsed by Hal Jackman, Ila Bossons, Norman Atkins and Michael Chong. He campaigned on fiscal accountability, improving and expanding the TTC, and protecting parks.
- Perry Missal (registered February 12)
- Ram Narula (registered September 10)
- Ella Rebanks (registered February 18)
- Paul Spence (registered January 12)
- Chris Tindal (registered January 19) Tindal was the Green Party of Canada candidate in Toronto Centre in the 2006 federal election, and in the 2008 by-election
- Kristyn Wong-Tam elected (registered March 1) Wong-Tam is a real estate agent and community activist who was also the registered owner of the website of the group Queers Against Israeli Apartheid. Wong-Tam has received the endorsement of the powerful Toronto and York Labour Council which includes CUPE She was supported by neighbouring councillor Adam Vaughan, former NDP candidate Cathy Crowe and Michele Landsberg. She was an advisor to Mayor David Miller on economic development.
- Simon Wookey (registered January 11) Wookey was a candidate for Ward 18 councillor in the 2006 election and is a Liberal Party campaigner who was endorsed by former provincial treasurer Greg Sorbara.

== Ward 28: Toronto Centre ==
Ward 28
Candidate	Votes	%
Pam McConnell	11,883	62.856%
Howard Bortenstein	3,730	19.73%
Dennis Hollingsworth	1,128	5.967%
Raj Rama	969	5.126%
Daniel Murton	633	3.348%
Eric Brazau	562	2.973%
Total	18,905	100%

- Howard Bortenstein (registered January 20) Borenstein is a management consultant and former banker and was the runner-up in 2006.
- Eric Brazau (registered February 16)
- Dennis Hollingsworth (registered September 1)
- Pam McConnell elected (incumbent) (registered January 7) A teacher by profession, McConnell was a school trustee for fourteen years, the last two as school board chair, before being elected to city council for the first time in 1994. She is currently vice-chair of the Toronto Police Services Board and served as chair from 2004 to 2005.
- Daniel Murton (registered July 2)
- Raj Rama (registered April 29)

== Ward 29: Toronto—Danforth ==
Ward 29
Candidate	Votes	%
Mary Fragedakis	7,430	41.814%
Jane Pitfield	4,966	27.948%
Jennifer Wood	4,269	24.025%
Chris Caldwell	885	4.981%
John Richardson	138	0.777%
Mike Restivo	81	0.456%
Total	17,769	100%

Incumbent Case Ootes retired.

- Chris Caldwell (registered January 4)
- Mary Fragedakis elected (registered March 18) Fragedakis was endorsed by NDP MPPs Peter Tabuns and Michael Prue and federal MP Jack Layton.
- Jane Pitfield (registered January 6) Pitfield is a former city councillor for Ward 26 (Don Valley West) and ran for mayor in 2006 as a right of centre candidate, losing to David Miller. She is associated with the provincial Progressive Conservatives and was endorsed by retiring city councillor Case Ootes.
- Mike Restivo (registered January 18)
- John Richardson (registered January 22)
- Jennifer Wood (registered February 12)

== Ward 30: Toronto—Danforth ==
Ward 30
Candidate	Votes	%
Paula Fletcher	8,766	45.356%
Liz West	8,507	44.016%
Andrew James	620	3.208%
Mark Dewdney	518	2.68%
Mihaly Varga	313	1.619%
Angie Tingas	262	1.356%
Andreas Bogojevic	198	1.024%
Gary Walsh	143	0.74%
Total	19,327	100%

- Andreas Bogojevic (registered September 3)
- Mark Dewdney (registered March 9)
- Paula Fletcher elected (incumbent) - former leader of the Manitoba Communist Party; won election to third term; chair of Parks and Environment Committee (2006-2010), piloting the city's climate change strategy
- Andrew James (registered February 23)
- Angie Tingas (registered August 13)
- Luciano Rizzuti (registered September 10)
- Mihaly Varga (registered August 19)
- Liz West (registered August 17) West was entertainment specialist on Citytv's CityNews at 6 until December 2008 when City's new owners eliminated the station's entertainment department and laid West and other staff off. She has worked as a freelance broadcaster since then for CP24, Maple Leaf Sports and Entertainment and CosmopolitanTV.

== Ward 31: Beaches—East York ==
Ward 31
Candidate	Registered	Votes	%	Notes
Janet Davis	January 4	11,177	63.27%	Incumbent, first elected 2003
Robert Walker	March 17	1,945	11.01%	
Peter Agaliotis	August 23	1,468	8.31%	
Brenda MacDonald	May 25	1,412	7.99%	
Rasal Rahman	September 8	1,065	6.03%	
Donna Braniff	January 27	505	2.86%	
Leonard Subotich	February 3	93	0.53%	
Total		17,665	100.00%	

== Ward 32: Beaches—East York ==
Ward 32
Candidate	Votes	%
Mary-Margaret McMahon	15,159	65.144%
Sandra Bussin (incumbent)	5,998	25.776%
Keith Begley	753	3.236%
Bruce Baker	477	2.05%
Brad Feraday	354	1.521%
Martin Gladstone	210	0.902%
Neil Sinclair	190	0.817%
Albert Castells	66	0.284%
Kieron Pope	63	0.271%
Total	23,270	100%

- Bruce Baker (registered January 4) Baker is a former Toronto Transit Commission bus driver who campaigned on the issue of the city's decision to award a 20-year contract to Tuggs Incorporated to run the Beaches' Boardwalk Pub.
- Keith Begley (registered August 3)
- Sandra Bussin (incumbent - registered March 10) Bussin is the Speaker of Toronto City Council and is an NDPer and an environmentalist.
- Albert Castells (registered January 7)
- Michael Connor (registered August 11)
- Brad Feraday (registered August 9)
- Martin Gladstone (registered August 12) Gladstone, a lawyer, is best known for having unsuccessfully campaigned to have the group Queers Against Israeli Apartheid banned from Toronto's Gay Pride Parade. He is also campaigning against the Tuggs contract. Gladstone dropped out of the race and threw his support behind fellow candidate Mary-Margaret McMahon
- Mary-Margaret McMahon elected (registered May 13) McMahon received former Ontario PC Party Leader John Tory's endorsement on Saturday, October 16.
- Kieron Pope (registered May 12)
- Neil Sinclair (registered August 30)Retired lawyer and businessman who also dropped out of the race and threw his support behind Mary-Margaret McMahon

== Ward 33: Don Valley East ==
Ward 33
Candidate	Votes	%
Shelley Carroll	7,946	57.659%
Fil Giannakopoulos	2,787	20.223%
Mike Ihnat	1,886	13.686%
David Raines	1,162	8.432%
Total	13,781	100%

- Shelley Carroll elected (incumbent) (registered January 12) Carroll was first elected to city council in 2003 and serves as the city's budget chief.
- Fil Giannakopoulos (registered April 26)
- Mike Ihnat (registered July 19)
- David Raines (registered May 10)

== Ward 34: Don Valley East ==
Ward 34
Candidate	Votes	%
Denzil Minnan-Wong	8,743	53.418%
Peter Youngren	6,484	39.616%
Stephan Stewart	1,140	6.965%
Total	16,367	100%

- Denzil Minnan-Wong elected (incumbent) (registered March 19) Minnan-Wong was first elected to North York city council in 1994 and joined Toronto city council in 1997. He is a conservative and a member of the Responsible Government Group on council.
- Stephan Stewart (registered April 30)
- Peter Karl Youngren (registered March 29)

== Ward 35: Scarborough Southwest ==
Ward 35
Candidate	Votes	%
Michelle Berardinetti	8,293	50.453%
Adrian Heaps	6,020	36.625%
Malik Ahmad	850	5.171%
Victoria Doyle	429	2.61%
Ed Green	253	1.539%
John Lewis	183	1.113%
Jay Burnett	173	1.053%
Peter Tijiri	90	0.548%
John Morawietz	76	0.462%
Jason Woychesko	70	0.426%
Total	16,437	100%

- Malik Ahmad (registered June 14)
- Michelle Berardinetti elected (registered January 18) Beradinetti, a political consultant, narrowly lost the 2006 election to Heaps and subsequently sued him for defamation. She is married to Liberal MPP Lorenzo Berardinetti.
- Jay Burnett (registered January 18)
- Victoria Doyle (registered August 5)
- Ed Green (registered February 5)
- Adrian Heaps (incumbent) (registered January 4) Heaps was first elected in 2006 after defeating Michelle Berardinetti by 89 votes. He is considered to be a member of council's progressive wing. He is son of former NDP candidate Leo Heaps and grandson of CCF founding member and labour leader Abraham Albert Heaps
- John Lewis (registered August 31)
- John Morawietz (registered August 31)
- Peter Tijiri (registered June 29)
- Jason Woychesko (registered April 23)

== Ward 36: Scarborough Southwest ==
Ward 36
Candidate	Votes	%
Gary Crawford	4,392	25.249%
Robert Spencer	3,970	22.823%
Diane Hogan	2,341	13.458%
Sean Gladney	2,233	12.837%
Eddy Gasparotto	1,727	9.928%
Marvin Macaraig	866	4.978%
Vicki Breen	663	3.811%
Robert McDermott	518	2.978%
Tony Ashdown	475	2.731%
Roman Danilov	210	1.207%
Total	17,395	100%

Incumbent Brian Ashton did not seek re-election.

- Tony Ashdown (registered August 31)
- Vicki Breen (registered January 4)
- Gary Crawford elected (registered June 29) Crawford is a long-time school trustee.
- Roman Danilov (registered August 3)
- Eddy Gasparotto (registered September 10)
- Sean Gladney (registered April 22)
- Diane Hogan (registered July 5)
- Marvin Macaraig (registered August 20)
- Robert McDermott (registered June 28)
- Robert Spencer (registered July 13)

== Ward 37: Scarborough Centre ==
Ward 37
Candidate	Votes	%
Michael Thompson	15,129	83.636%
Isabelle Champagne	1,571	8.685%
Fawzi Bidawi	1,014	5.606%
Sergio Otoya Salazar	375	2.073%
Total	18,089	100%

- Fawzi Bidawi (registered August 31)
- Isabelle Champagne (registered February 11)
- Sergio Otoya Salazar (registered September 3)
- Michael Thompson elected (incumbent) (registered January 20) Thompson was first elected to council in 2003 and is considered to be a conservative "law and order" politician.

== Ward 38: Scarborough Centre ==
Ward 38
Candidate	Votes	%
Glenn De Baeremaeker	11,166	62.443%
Glenn Middleton	4,541	25.394%
Tushar Shah	824	4.608%
Kirk Jensen	708	3.959%
Sandip Vora	643	3.596%
Total	17,882	100%

- Glenn De Baeremaeker elected (incumbent) (registered January 4) An environmentalist and cycling enthusiast, De Baeremaeker rose to prominence for his work with the Save the Rouge group fighting to keep the Rouge Valley area of Scarborough free from development. He was first elected to city council in 2003.
- Kirk Jensen (registered June 1)
- Glenn Middleton (registered January 13)
- Tushar Shah (registered September 8)
- Sandip Vora (registered August 30)

== Ward 39: Scarborough—Agincourt ==
Ward 39
Candidate	Votes	%
Mike Del Grande	9,931	68.184%
Kevin Xu	3,640	24.991%
Caldwell Williams	994	6.825%
Total	14,565	100%

- Michael Del Grande elected (incumbent) (registered January 4) First elected in 2003, Del Grande is a founding member of Scarborough Needs Accountable Politicians (SNAP), and has been a member of the Scarborough Homeowners Alliance for Fair Taxes since this group's inception
- Caldwell Williams (registered March 10)
- Kevin Xu (registered August 27)

== Ward 40: Scarborough—Agincourt ==
Ward 40
Candidate	Votes	%
Norm Kelly	12,458	74.001%
Ken Sy	1,935	11.494%
Bryan Heal	1,862	11.06%
Cheng-Chih Tsai	580	3.445%
Total	16,835	100%

- Bryan Heal (registered January 11)
- Norm Kelly elected (incumbent) (registered January 4) Kelly first served on Scarborough Borough Council from 1974 until 1980 when he was elected to the House of Commons as a Liberal MP but was defeated in 1984 and again in 1988. He subsequently returned to municipal politics and was elected to Metro Council for Scarborough in 1994 and Toronto City Council in 1997.
- Ken Sy (registered June 28)
- Cheng-Chih Tsai (registered September 9)

== Ward 41: Scarborough—Rouge River ==
Ward 41
Candidate	Votes	%
Chin Lee	12,557	70.616%
Patricia Sinclair	2,718	15.285%
Danny Chien	2,507	14.099%
Total	17,782	100%

- Danny Chien (registered July 7)
- Chin Lee elected (incumbent) (registered January 6) Lee was seeking his second term as councillor.
- Patricia Sinclair (registered July 14)

== Ward 42: Scarborough—Rouge River ==
Ward 42
Candidate	Votes	%
Raymond Cho	10,811	52.93%
Neethan Shan	6,873	33.65%
Shamoon Poonawala	586	2.869%
Mohammed Ather	474	2.321%
Namu Ponnambalam	443	2.169%
Ruth Tecle	437	2.14%
George Singh	353	1.728%
Leon Saul	323	1.581%
Venthan Ramanathavavuniyan	125	0.612%
Total	20,425	100%

- Mohammed Ather (registered January 6)
- Raymond Cho elected (incumbent) (registered January 14) Cho, 74, is a social worker by training and was first elected to Scarborough City Council in 1991 and has served on Toronto City Council since 1997. He has been active in both the New Democratic Party and the Liberal Party.
- Namu Ponnambalam (registered February 18)
- Shamoon Poonawala (registered January 4)
- Venthan Ramanathavavuniyan (registered April 19)
- Leon Saul (registered August 4)
- Neethan Shan (registered January 4)
- George Singh (registered September 7)
- Ruth Tecle (registered June 22)

== Ward 43: Scarborough East ==
Ward 43
Candidate	Votes	%
Paul Ainslie	9,334	60.559%
John Laforet	4,440	28.807%
Bhaskar Sharma	758	4.918%
Benjamin Mbaegbu	489	3.173%
Samuel Getachew	392	2.543%
Total	15,413	100%

- Paul Ainslie elected (incumbent) (registered January 4) Ainslie has been a city councillor since 2003 and was previously executive assistant to David Soknacki.
- Samuel Getachew (registered February 18) Getachew is a community builder and activist. He has worked on many campaigns including the then Senator Barack Obama's presidential campaign in Ohio and Pennsylvania. His writings have appeared in the Toronto Sun, Tzta, Sway magazine, Metro Daily and the Ottawa Citizen among others.
- John Laforet (registered January 15) Laforet lives in Ward 43 and has been a local community activist for years on issues ranging from historical preservation to opposition to Toronto Hydro's offshore wind proposal. He is the President of Wind Concerns Ontario.
- Benjamin Mbaegbu (registered April 8) Mbaegbu ran for Mayor of Toronto in 2003, garnering 288 votes. In 2001 he sought election in Ward 31's by-election.
- Bhaskar Sharma (registered July 21) Sharma has a background in media and has been the publisher of a well-circulated paper for the last twenty-five years.

== Ward 44: Scarborough East ==
Ward 44
Candidate	Votes	%
Ron Moeser	10,185	47.456%
Diana Hall	9,901	46.133%
Mohammed Mirza	749	3.49%
Heath Thomas	627	2.921%
Total	21,462	100%

- Diana Hall (registered January 4) Hall was the runner-up in the 2006 election losing to Ron Moeser by 61 votes.
- Mohammed Mirza (registered September 8)
- Ron Moeser elected (incumbent) (registered February 2) Moeser was first elected to Scarborough city council in 1988 and then Toronto city council in 1997. He was defeated in 2003 by Gay Cowbourne but returned to office in 2006 when Cowbourne retired, defeating Diana Hall by 61 votes.
- Heath Thomas (registered January 18)
