= Ward 6 York Centre =

Municipal council district in Toronto, Ontario, Canada

- Constituency for the Toronto City Council
- Location of Ward 6 in Toronto
- City: Toronto
- Population: 104,320 (2016)

Current constituency
- Created: 2018
- Councillor: James Pasternak
- Community council: North York
- Created from: Ward 9; Ward 10
- First contested: 2018 election
- Last contested: 2026 election
- Ward profile: www.toronto.ca/ward-6-york-centre/

Ward 6 York Centre is a municipal electoral division in Toronto, Ontario, Canada that has been represented in the Toronto City Council since the 2018 municipal election. It was last contested in 2026, with James Pasternak elected councillor.

== Boundaries ==
On August 14, 2018, the Government of Ontario redrew municipal boundaries via the Better Local Government Act, 2018, S.O. 2018, c. 11 - Bill 5. This means that the 25 provincial electoral districts and the 25 municipal wards in Toronto currently share the same geographic borders.

Defined in legislation as:

Consisting of that part of the City of Toronto described as follows: commencing at the intersection of the northerly limit of said city with Keele Street; thence southerly along said street to Grandravine Drive; thence generally westerly along said drive to Black Creek; thence generally southeasterly along said creek to Sheppard Avenue West; thence westerly along said avenue to Jane Street; thence southerly along said street to Highway No. 401; thence easterly and northeasterly along said highway to the Don River West Branch; thence generally northwesterly along said branch to Bathurst Street; thence northerly along said street to the northerly limit of said city; thence westerly along said limit to the point of commencement.

== History ==
=== 2018 Boundary Adjustment ===
Toronto municipal ward boundaries were significantly modified in 2018 during the election campaign. Ultimately the new ward structure was used and later upheld by the Supreme Court of Canada in 2021.

The current ward is an amalgamation of the old Ward 9 and the old Ward 10.

=== 2018 municipal election ===
Ward 6 York Centre was first contested during the 2018 municipal election. The Ward 9 incumbent, Maria Augimeri, ran against Ward 10 incumbent James Pasternak and two other candidates. Pasternak was ultimately elected with 47.61 per cent of the vote.

== Geography ==
Despite its name, Ward 6 York Centre is part of the North York community council, and does not form part of the former city of York.

York Centre is bounded on the north by Steeles Avenue (the city limit), and on the east, south and west by a line drawn from the city limit south along Yonge Street, west along the hydroelectric transmission line north of Finch Avenue, south along Bathurst Street, southeast along the Don River West Branch, southwest and west along Highway 401, north along Jane Street, east along Sheppard Avenue, northwest along Black Creek, east along Grandravine Drive, and north along Keele Street to the city limit.

== Councillors ==
Council term	Member	
Council term	North York Spadina (Metro Council)	
1988–1991	Howard Moscoe	
1991–1994	Howard Moscoe	
1994–1997	Howard Moscoe	
	Ward 8 North York Spadina	
1997–2000	Howard Moscoe, Mike Feldman	
	Ward 9 York Centre	Ward 10 York Centre
2000–2003	Maria Augimeri	Mike Feldman
2003–2006	Maria Augimeri	Mike Feldman
2006–2010	Maria Augimeri	Mike Feldman
2010–2014	Maria Augimeri	James Pasternak
2014–2018	Maria Augimeri	James Pasternak
	Ward 6 York Centre	
2018–2022	James Pasternak	
2022–2026	James Pasternak	
2026–2030	James Pasternak	

== Election results ==
2026 Toronto municipal election

Candidate	Votes	%	minus
James Pasternak (X)	23,223	70.99	4.54 ▼
Conroy Irving	7,001	21.40	–
Alexander Artamonov	2,487	7.60	–

2022 Toronto municipal election, Ward 6 York Centre
Candidate	Votes	Vote share
James Pasternak	12,187	75.53%
Mike Arkin	1,916	11.56%
Hope Schrier	1,292	7.80%
Basil Canning	1,179	7.11%

2018 Toronto municipal election, Ward 6 York Centre
Candidate	Votes	Vote share
James Pasternak	11,559	47.61%
Maria Augimeri	9,223	37.99%
Louise Russo	2,726	11.23%
Edward Zaretsky	771	3.17%
Total	24,279	100%
Source: City of Toronto

== See also ==
- Municipal elections in Canada
- Municipal government of Toronto
- List of Toronto municipal elections
