= RGG =

RGG may refer to:

- Random geometric graph, a concept in mathematical graph theory
- Responsible Government Group (2009), a centre-right caucus in the City Council of Toronto, Canada
- Ryū ga Gotoku, a video game series, known also as Like a Dragon and Yakuza in the west
  - Ryū ga Gotoku, also known as Yakuza, the Japanese title of the first Like a Dragon game
  - Ryu Ga Gotoku Studio, the primary developer of the Like a Dragon series, among other games
