= York Centre =

York Centre may refer to:

- York Centre (federal electoral district), federal riding in Toronto, Ontario, Canada
- York Centre (provincial electoral district), provincial riding in Toronto, Ontario, Canada
- Ward 6 York Centre, municipal ward in Toronto, Ontario, Canada
