= Mary-Margaret McMahon =

Canadian politician (born 1966)

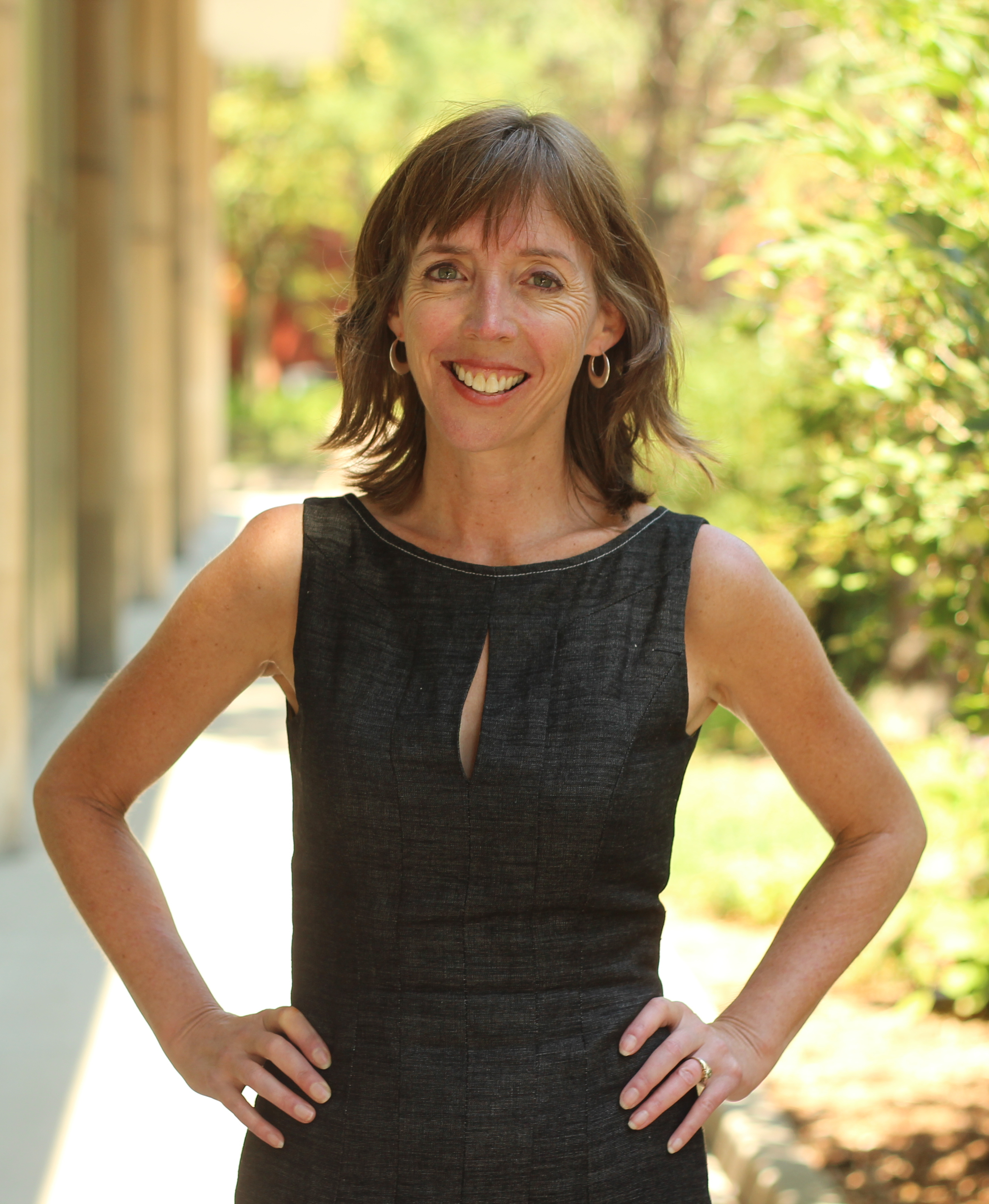
- McMahon in 2016

Member of the Ontario Provincial Parliament for Beaches—East York
- Incumbent
- Assumed office June 2, 2022
- Preceded by: Rima Berns-McGown

Toronto City Councillor for Ward 32 Beaches-East York
- In office December 1, 2010 – December 1, 2018
- Preceded by: Sandra Bussin
- Succeeded by: Brad Bradford

Personal details
- Born: July 6, 1966 (age 60) Collingwood, Ontario, Canada
- Party: Ontario Liberal
- Other political affiliations: Independent (municipal politicians are elected on a non-partisan basis in Toronto)
- Spouse: James McMahon
- Children: 2
- Website: https://marymargaretmcmahonmpp.ca/

Mary-Margaret McMahon (born July 6, 1966) is a Canadian politician. She was elected MPP for the Ontario Liberal Party in Beaches—East York in the June 2022 provincial election. Previously, McMahon served on the Toronto City Council from 2010 to 2018, representing Ward 32 Beaches—East York.

== Background ==
Born and raised in Collingwood, Ontario, she is the daughter of former Collingwood mayor Ron Emo and Gloria Emo. McMahon is one of four children, including brothers Michael, Stephen and Timothy. Since 1990, she has resided in the Beaches—East York area.

McMahon taught English as a second language and worked as a community activist. She founded the East Lynn Park Farmers market and helped organize an anti-idling campaign at her children's school. She previously worked for Live Green Toronto as a community animator.

== Political career ==
McMahon was first elected to Toronto City Council in the 2010 city council election, defeating city council speaker Sandra Bussin in Ward 32 Beaches—East York. She describes herself as a "fiscally responsible environmentalist." She served Ward 32 from 2010 to 2018, when she declined to run in the 2018 Toronto municipal election.

In October 2017 McMahon announced she would not be running for re-election in 2018, confirming a promise made when she was first elected in 2010. During her time as a councillor she brought forward two motions to Toronto City Council calling for term limits, but both were defeated.

In October 2020, she announced her candidacy for the Ontario Liberal Party nomination in the provincial electoral district of Beaches—East York. She was elected in the 2022 Ontario general election.

As of July 7, 2024, she serves as the Liberal Party critic for Environment and Climate Change. Since being re-elected in 2025, she was appointed Chair of the Standing Committee on Government Agencies.

== Electoral history ==
2025 Ontario general election: Beaches—East York
| Party | Candidate | Votes | % | ±% | Expenditures |
|---|---|---|---|---|---|
| Liberal | Mary-Margaret McMahon | 21,545 | 51.17 | +15.75 | $63,307 |
| New Democratic | Kate Dupuis | 9,660 | 22.94 | –10.27 | $115,614 |
| Progressive Conservative | Anna Michaelidis | 9,001 | 21.38 | +2.84 | $70,556 |
| Green | Jack Pennings | 1,298 | 3.08 | –7.14 | $4,350 |
| New Blue | Thomas Gregory | 246 | 0.58 | –0.50 | $0 |
| Ontario Party | Paul Stark | 125 | 0.30 | –0.47 | $0 |
| Independent | Dragan Cimesa | 122 | 0.29 | – | $0 |
| Canadians' Choice | Bahman Yazdanfar | 107 | 0.25 | +0.06 | $0 |
| Total valid votes/expense limit | | 42,104 | 99.58 | – | $136,230 |
| Total rejected, unmarked and declined ballots | | 178 | 0.42 | +0.07 | |
| Turnout | | 42,282 | 49.97 | +0.39 | |
| Eligible voters | | 84,615 | | | |
| Liberal hold | | Swing | | +13.01 | |
Source: Elections Ontario

2022 Ontario general election: Beaches—East York
| Party | Candidate | Votes | % | ±% | Expenditures |
|---|---|---|---|---|---|
| Liberal | Mary-Margaret McMahon | 14,398 | 35.42 | +8.41 | $91,050 |
| New Democratic | Kate Dupuis | 13,500 | 33.21 | –15.00 | $90,885 |
| Progressive Conservative | Angela Kennedy | 7,536 | 18.54 | +0.10 | $21,977 |
| Green | Abhijeet Manay | 4,154 | 10.22 | +5.96 | $43,979 |
| New Blue | Stephen Roney | 441 | 1.08 | – | $0 |
| Ontario Party | John Ferguson | 310 | 0.76 | – | $0 |
| Communist | Drew Garvie | 120 | 0.30 | – | $0 |
| None of the Above | Joe Ring | 111 | 0.27 | +0.06 | $0 |
| Canadians' Choice | Bahman Yazdanfar | 78 | 0.19 | +0.04 | $0 |
| Total valid votes/expense limit | | 40,648 | 99.65 | – | $116,071 |
| Total rejected, unmarked and declined ballots | | 143 | 0.35 | –0.58 | |
| Turnout | | 40,791 | 49.58 | –11.58 | |
| Eligible voters | | 82,279 | | | |
| Liberal gain from New Democratic | | Swing | | ▲11.71 | |
Source: Elections Ontario

2014 Toronto election, Ward 32
| Candidate | Votes | % |
| Mary-Margaret McMahon (incumbent) | 15,762 | 60.92 |
| Sandra Bussin | 4,552 | 17.59 |
| Brian Graff | 1,922 | 7.43 |
| 9 other candidates | 3,639 | 14.06 |
| Total | 25,875 | 100.00 |

2010 Toronto election, Ward 32
| Candidate | Votes | % |
| Mary-Margaret McMahon | 15,159 | 65.144% |
| Sandra Bussin (incumbent) | 5,998 | 25.776% |
| Keith Begley | 753 | 3.236% |
| Bruce Baker | 477 | 2.05% |
| Brad Feraday | 354 | 1.521% |
| Martin Gladstone | 210 | 0.902% |
| Neil Sinclair | 190 | 0.817% |
| Albert Castells | 66 | 0.284% |
| Kieron Pope | 63 | 0.271% |
| Total | 23,270 | 100% |
