= Sandra Bussin =

Canadian politician

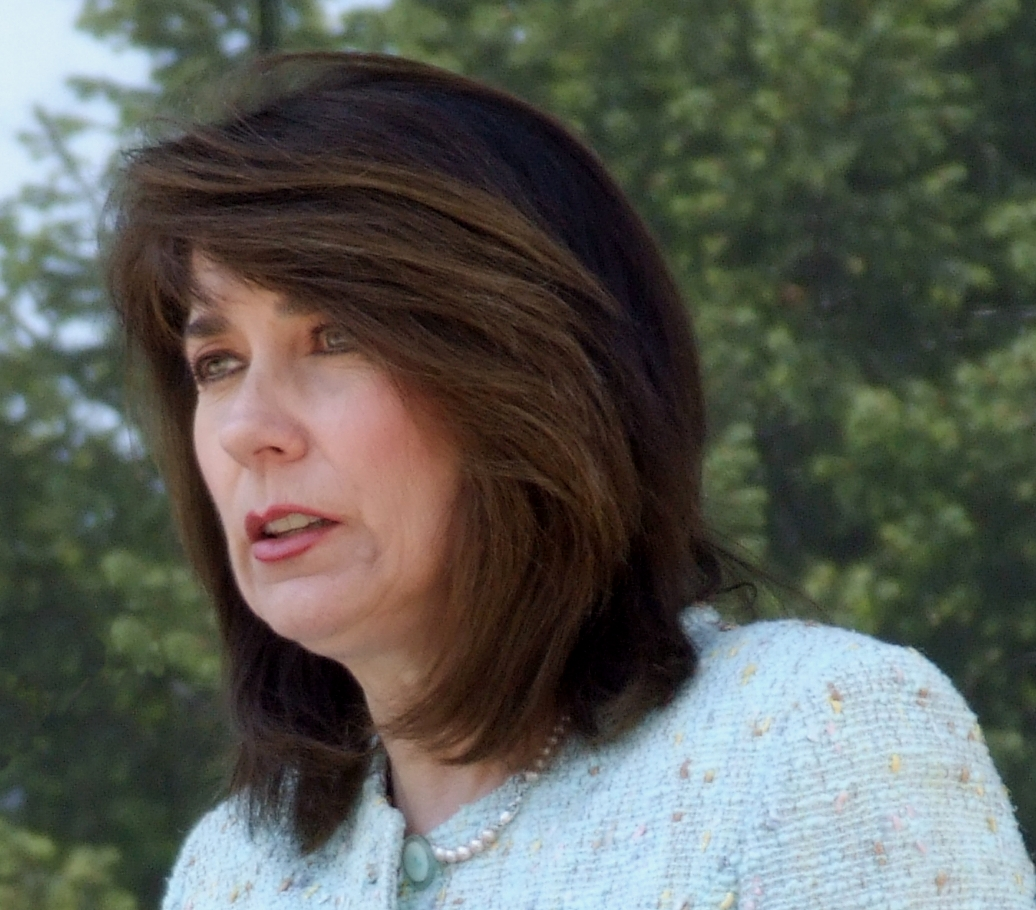

Toronto City Councillor for Ward 32 Beaches-East York
- In office December 1, 2000 – December 1, 2010
- Preceded by: New ward
- Succeeded by: Mary-Margaret McMahon

Speaker of Toronto City Council
- In office 2006–2010
- Preceded by: New position
- Succeeded by: Frances Nunziata

City Councillor for Ward 26 - East Toronto
- In office January 1, 1998 – December 1, 2000 Serving with Tom Jakobek
- Preceded by: New ward
- Succeeded by: Ward abolished

Personal details
- Occupation: Teacher

Sandra Bussin is a politician in Toronto, Ontario, Canada. She was a municipal councillor for Toronto City Council for Ward 32 Beaches-East York in east end of Toronto from 1998 to 2010. From 2006 to 2010 she was Speaker of Toronto City Council.

== Background ==
Bussin was born in Toronto and grew up in the Dawes Road area. She attended Coleman Avenue Public School, then to Central Tech and Eastern Commerce. Bussin graduated with a BA in fine arts from York University. She worked as a teacher and served as a trustee for the Toronto District School Board. She also worked as a senior political advisor at the provincial legislature for NDP Member of Provincial Parliament Morton Shulman.

== City councillor ==
Elected in 1997 to the first council of the newly amalgamated City of Toronto, Bussin served four terms as city councillor for Ward 32 Beaches-East York. In the council term from 2003 to 2006, Bussin served as a deputy mayor of Toronto, jointly with Joe Pantalone and Mike Feldman. In 2006, she was appointed as the first Speaker of Toronto City Council.

She was known at council as an environmentalist, who championed the modernisation of the Ashbridges Bay Wastewater Treatment Plant. Bussin was formerly past chair of the Roundtable for a Clean and Beautiful City. During her time as councillor six incinerators were shut down. She also managed a $2.2 million renovation and extension of the Beaches Library. As well, $12 million was approved to build the new Main Square Recreation Centre and $750,000 for the new addition of the Kimberley Public School. Bussin acquired the Kew Williams (Gardener's Cottage) for community use. She secured $11 million for the landscape and active sport field plan in Ashbridges Bay area.

During her time on city council, Bussin was closely aligned with mayor David Miller, who is considered to be on the left wing of the political spectrum.

Bussin was defeated by newcomer Mary-Margaret McMahon in the municipal election held on October 25, 2010. McMahon defeated Bussin by a margin of over 2.5 to 1.

=== Controversies ===
In 2009, Bussin won financial support from Toronto City Council to take legal action against a local publication, Ward 32 News, which she claimed had made untrue and defamatory statements about her. This case was criticized by councillor Mike Del Grande, who was quoted by the Toronto Star as saying that "taxpayers could be easily intimidated by a councillor who has the financial backing of the city".

In September 2009, Bussin placed a live call to John Tory's Newstalk 1010 Strong Opinions radio show to defend the legacy of outgoing Mayor David Miller. Bussin provided only her first name and denied that she worked for the City of Toronto. She then concluded her call by saying "And good luck to you, John, because you're a three-time loser. And I don't see you being successful in the future." After being revealed as the caller, Bussin apologized to both Tory and to city council. Councillor Denzil Minnan-Wong requested a review of Bussin's actions from Toronto integrity commissioner Janet Leiper.

In 2010, prior to her electoral defeat, Bussin faced criticism for her role in three unrelated zoning disputes involving an older house, the post-arson replacement of a commercial building, and a supportive-housing project for the mentally ill. Also that year, Bussin was criticized for allocating her office operating budget to community groups including youth sports teams, and a former restaurant employee told the Toronto Sun that he had been paid by the restaurant to "volunteer" for Bussin's campaign.

== After city council ==
As of 2012, Bussin works as a real estate agent for Forest Hill Real Estate Inc. She also writes a monthly column for a community newspaper called the Town Crier.

Bussin attempted to regain her seat as councillor for Ward 32 in the 2014 municipal election. She lost again to Mary Margaret McMahon, by a larger margin than in the 2010 election.

== Election results ==
2014 Toronto election, Ward 32
Candidate	Votes	%
Mary-Margaret McMahon (incumbent)	15,762	60.92
Sandra Bussin	4,552	17.59
Brian Graff	1,922	7.43
9 other candidates	3,639	14.06
Total	25,875	100.00

2010 Toronto election, Ward 32
Candidate	Votes	%
Mary-Margaret McMahon	15,159	65.14
Sandra Bussin (incumbent)	5,998	25.78
Keith Begley	753	3.24
Bruce Baker	477	2.05
Brad Feraday	354	1.52
Martin Gladstone	210	0.90
Neil Sinclair	190	0.82
Albert Castells	66	0.28
Kieron Pope	63	0.27
Total	23,270	100.00

2006 Toronto election, Ward 32
Candidate	Votes	%
Sandra Bussin (incumbent)	10377	69.8
Erica Maier	1287	8.7
John Lewis	1081	7.3
Donna Braniff	660	4.4
Matt Williams	557	3.7
Alan Burke	332	2.2
John Greer	305	2.1
William Gallos	196	1.3
Luca Mele	82	0.6

2003 Toronto election, Ward 32
Candidate	Votes	%
Sandra Bussin	12245	63.4
Chris Yaccato	5082	26.3
Alan Burke	527	2.7
Colleen Mills	527	2.7
Donna Braniff	514	2.7
Jeffrey Dorman	224	1.2
Robert Livingston	183	0.6
