= Karen Stintz =

Canadian politician

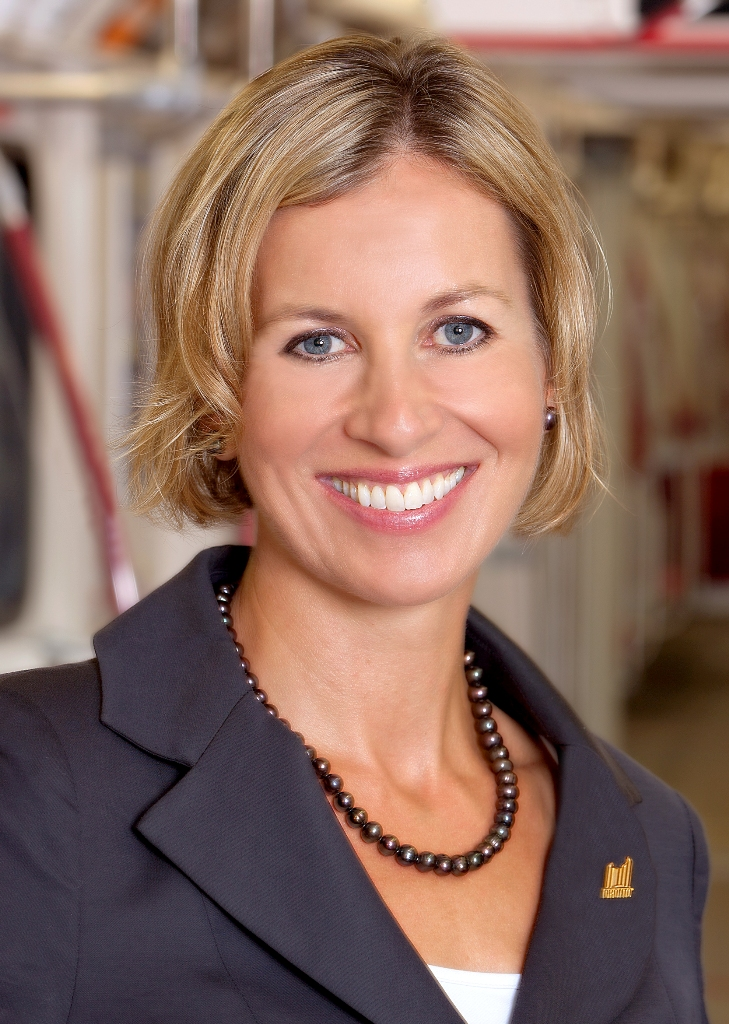
- Councillor Karen Stintz, 2012

Toronto City Councillor for Ward 16 Eglinton—Lawrence
- In office December 1, 2003 – December 1, 2014
- Preceded by: Anne Johnston
- Succeeded by: Christin Carmichael Greb

Chair of the Toronto Transit Commission
- In office December 1, 2010 – February 19, 2014
- Preceded by: Adam Giambrone
- Succeeded by: Maria Augimeri

Personal details
- Born: Karen Ruth Stintz; November 2, 1971 (age 55) North York, Ontario, Canada
- Party: Independent (municipal)
- Other political affiliations: Conservative Party of Canada (federal)
- Spouse: Darryl Parisien
- Children: 2
- Education: University of Western Ontario (BA); Boston University (MSc); Queen's University (MPA)
- Occupation: Civil servant; politician

Karen Ruth Stintz (born November 2, 1971) is a Canadian politician who represented Ward 16 Eglinton—Lawrence on Toronto City Council from 2003 to 2014 and was the chair of the Toronto Transit Commission (TTC) from 2010 to 2014. She was the Conservative Party of Canada's candidate for the riding of Eglinton—Lawrence in the 2025 Canadian federal election. In 2026, she released her debut book, Beyond Good Enough: Toronto and the Crisis of Urban Complacency, published by Sutherland House Experts.

== Background ==
Karen Ruth Stintz is the only child of Henry Stintz, a NASA engineer, and Barbara Stintz (née Bear). She was raised in Toronto, and got her BA at the University of Western Ontario. She subsequently obtained a Master of Science in journalism from Boston University and a Master of Public Administration from Queen's University. Before she became a councillor, she worked in the healthcare sector.

Stintz is married to software executive Darryl Parisien. She and her husband live in the Lawrence Park neighbourhood with their two children.

== Political career ==
=== Ward 16 City Councillor ===
In March 2009, Stintz came under scrutiny when it was revealed that she spent $4,500 of her councillor's office budget on voice lessons. She did so after being told "she speaks too fast and that her message is being lost as a result." She said that the lessons improved her speaking during council meetings.

In 2009, Stintz was one of the leaders of the Responsible Government Group centre-right caucus on City Council which opposed the policies of Mayor David Miller. The group opposed Miller's handling of the 2009 City of Toronto inside and outside workers strike.

As the city councillor for Ward 16, Stintz initiated and supported various initiatives in the community of Eglinton-Lawrence. To deter graffiti, youth were recruited to create murals in the Anne Rawson Laneway, Duplex Parkette and Eglinton Park field house. When a development was proposed at 1717 Avenue Road, urban design guidelines were created. Stintz supported Orchard View Pedestrian Square, which "was a resounding success." With the "Can the Trash Contest", students from schools across the ward were asked to create posters that illustrated the various reasons for properly putting trash in garbage cans. Stintz played a role in finding equitable ice time for those who use the ice rinks in North Toronto and finding space for dog owners to walk their dogs off-leash in a way that did not interfere with other residents.

In April 2009, Stintz accused Mayor David Miller of lying during a debate about payroll costs. Stintz later produced a document addressed to Municipal Affairs Minister Jim Watson titled Next Steps for the Strong Mayor Model in the Toronto Context. However, the document uses phrases such as "political parties", "party discipline" and "party labels", and asks for $25,000 to be paid to the Conference Board of Canada to study the options. A spokesman for the minister said the request was for a "study of city hall governance that would have included a look at political parties."

=== Chair of the Toronto Transit Commission ===
In 2010, Stintz was appointed to the position as chair of the Toronto Transit Commission with the support of Mayor Rob Ford.

During her time as chair, the TTC introduced a "Customer Charter" which included posting performance reports on TTC surface routes, an annual TTC Town Hall, six Twitter Town Halls per year and five "Meet the Manager" events where customers could engage with senior TTC staff. During her time as chair, 153 articulated buses were added to the fleet and new subway cars were placed on the Yonge-University-Spadina line. Customer service operating hours were extended to seven days a week from 7 am to 10 pm. The new position of TTC Station Manager was created, more vehicle arrival screens were put up and debit and credit card payment systems were made available. A suicide prevention program was launched with Toronto Distress Centres and Bell Canada and Stintz oversaw the approval the Presto card's introduction to the TTC. The TTC began the introduction of WiFi services in its stations during this time.

The TTC's government subsidy received was reduced by 10% around this time. As a partial response, the TTC eliminated 482 positions and negotiated new fuel contracts to save the TTC $23.5 million between 2010 and 2012 and an estimated $30 million from 2013 to 2014. It also contracted out bus and washroom cleaning services and leased the Toronto Coach Terminal.

Stintz successfully moved a motion in March 2012 at City Council to remove five city councillors from the TTC Board, who were all Rob Ford supporters (Vincent Crisanti, Frank Di Giorgio, Norm Kelly, Cesar Palacio and Denzil Minnan-Wong). The five councillors, who constituted a majority of the TTC Board, had voted to terminate the services of the TTC general manager Gary Webster.

Toronto City Council expanded the TTC Board in 2012, on Stintz' recommendation, from nine councillors to an 11-member body with seven councillors plus four citizen members.

Concerned about budget cuts and negative public perception of the TTC, Stintz revealed on a February 2012 episode of the show Undercover Boss Canada that she had gone undercover at the TTC for a week in 2011. Changing her appearance and posing as "Ruth Bear", a newly hired TTC trainee, she shadowed a subway train operator, an upholsterer, a station caretaker and a night shift bus serviceperson, trying each of their respective jobs (for the subway operator, she used a simulator instead).

=== 2014 mayoral race ===
On October 27, 2013, Stintz announced that she would run for mayor in 2014. After stepping down as TTC chair in February, she registered as a candidate on February 24, 2014. Her campaign focused on fighting congestion, creating safe neighbourhoods and building strong communities. Some of her proposals were a "downtown relief subway line, reform[ing] the land transfer tax, a joint Toronto–U.S. bid for the 2026 World Cup and explor[ing] a 'hybrid' solution for the eastern part of the Gardiner Expressway." On August 21, 2014, Stintz announced she was dropping out of the race and would not seek re-election as city councillor.

== Later career ==
In late August 2014, after withdrawing from the mayoral election, Stintz expressed interest in becoming commissioner of the Canadian Football League. In 2015, she was appointed as executive director of the nonprofit arts service organization ArtsBuild Ontario. In November 2015, Stintz was named president and CEO of the Ontario chapter of the Variety Village children's charity.

=== 2025 federal election ===
Stintz left Variety Village in 2024 to seek the Conservative Party of Canada nomination in her home riding of Eglinton—Lawrence. She won the nomination and became the Conservative Party of Canada candidate in Eglinton—Lawrence in the 2025 federal election. Stintz received 29,061 votes, or 47.8% of the vote, finishing second to Liberal Party of Canada candidate Vince Gasparro, who received 29,949 (49.3%). Gasparro's margin of victory was 888 votes, or 1.5 percentage points, making the race one of the closest federal contests in Toronto. Although Stintz did not win the seat, her 2025 campaign produced one of the Conservative Party's strongest results in Toronto and was the strongest performance by a Conservative candidate in Eglinton—Lawrence since the riding's creation, surpassing Joe Oliver's 2011 election victory. Her vote total was the third-highest received by any candidate in the riding's history, behind Gasparro's 2025 result and Marco Mendicino's 2019 re-election.

=== Beyond Good Enough: Toronto and the Crisis of Urban Complacency ===
Stintz's debut book Beyond Good Enough: Toronto and the Crisis of Urban Complacency, was published by Sutherland House Experts on September 15, 2026. The book examines Toronto's development since the 1998 amalgamation. Drawing on her experience as a former Toronto City Councillor and Chair of the Toronto Transit Commission, Stintz examines what she identifies as political, structural and cultural challenges facing the city. The book discusses issues including governance, affordability, public services and competitiveness.

== Electoral record ==
2025 Canadian federal election: Eglinton—Lawrence
Party	Candidate	Votes	%	±%	Expenditures
Liberal	Vince Gasparro	29,949	49.3	+0.7	
Conservative	Karen Stintz	29,061	47.8	+11.4	
New Democratic	Allison Tanzola	996	1.6	–7.6	
Green	Wayne Chechuevskiy	429	0.7	–2.3	
People's	Timothy Gleeson	326	0.5	–2.4	
Total valid votes/expense limit		60,761	99.4	+0.4	
Total rejected ballots		416	0.6	-0.4	
Turnout		61,117	70.9	+9.1	
Eligible voters		86,150			
Liberal hold		Swing		–5.30	
Source: Elections Canada
