= James Pasternak =

Canadian politician

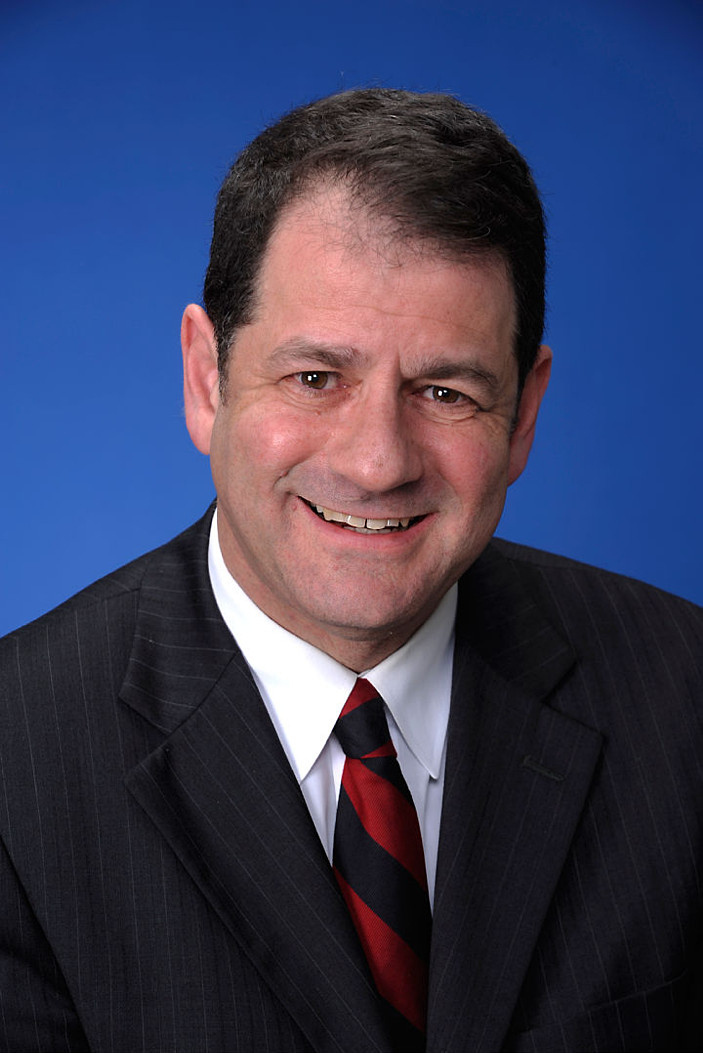
- Pasternak in 2010

Toronto City Councillor for Ward 6 York Centre
- Incumbent
- Assumed office December 1, 2018
- Preceded by: Ward created

Toronto City Councillor for Ward 10 York Centre
- In office December 1, 2010 – November 3, 2018
- Preceded by: Mike Feldman
- Succeeded by: Ward dissolved

Toronto District School Board Trustee for Ward 5 York Centre
- In office December 1, 2006 – November 30, 2010
- Preceded by: Shane Manikowsky
- Succeeded by: Howard Kaplan

Personal details
- Born: February 15, 1959 (age 67) Toronto, Ontario, Canada
- Occupation: Politician

James Pasternak (/ˈpæstərnæk/ PAST-ər-nak; born February 15, 1959) is a Canadian politician who represents Ward 6 York Centre on the Toronto City Council. Pasternak has served on council since he was elected in 2010, representing Ward 10 (later amalgamated into Ward 6). He was a Toronto District School Board trustee before his election to council.

== Background ==
Pasternak is a graduate of York University. He also has degrees from the University of Western Ontario and the London School of Economics and Political Science. He is a devout Jew.

== Political career ==
Pasternak was elected to Toronto City Council in the 2010 city council election to succeed Mike Feldman in Ward 10. He was previously a Toronto District School Board trustee.

In 2012, Pasternak introduced a motion that asked City Manager Joe Pennachetti to update Toronto's anti-discrimination policy and to determine whether including Queers Against Israeli Apartheid in Pride events violated the policy. Pasternak believes "QuAIA is not there to support the Palestinian people; it’s there to bully and demonize Israel, its supporters and the Jewish community." The following year, in 2013, Pasternak continued to lead the effort to defund Toronto Pride over the use of the term Israel apartheid by its participating members.

In July 2025, he called on the Canadian government to ban Irish hip hop band Kneecap from entering Canada. In November 2025, Pasternak attended a briefing in Israel by Deputy Foreign Minister Sharren Haskel while on a trip sponsored by the Israeli government.

== Election results ==
2026 Toronto municipal election, Ward 6 York Centre
Candidate	Votes	%	minus
James Pasternak (X)	23,223	70.99	4.54 ▼
Conroy Irving	7,001	21.40	–
Alexander Artamonov	2,487	7.60	–

2022 Toronto municipal election, Ward 6 York Centre
Candidate	Votes	Vote share
James Pasternak	12,187	73.54%
Mike Arkin	1,916	11.6%
Hope Schrier	1,292	7.8%
Basil Canning	1,179	7.1%
Total	16,574	100%
Source: City of Toronto

2018 Toronto municipal election, Ward 6 York Centre
Candidate	Votes	Vote share
James Pasternak	11,559	47.61%
Maria Augimeri	9,223	37.99%
Louise Russo	2,726	11.23%
Edward Zaretsky	771	3.17%
Total	24,279	100%
Source: City of Toronto

2014 Toronto election, Ward 10
Candidate	Votes	%
James Pasternak	11,183	57.78%
Igor Toutchinski	3,112	16.08%
Epstein David	2,126	10.99%
Mitchell Michael	1,096	5.66%
Bucao Randy	1,040	5.37%
Masucci Liberato	796	4.11%
Total	19,353	100%

2010 Toronto election, Ward 10
Candidate	Votes	%
James Pasternak	3,159	19.15%
Nancy Oomen	2,777	16.83%
Brian Shifman	2,632	15.96%
Igor Toutchinski	2,605	15.79%
Konstantin Toubis	1,887	11.44%
Magda Gondor Berkovits	935	5.67%
Jarred Friedman	850	5.15%
Joseph Cohen	535	3.24%
Eric Plant	355	2.15%
Edward Zaretsky	326	1.97%
Robert Freedland	244	1.48%
Drago Banovic	186	1.12%
Total	16,491	100%

2006 Toronto District School Board election, Ward 5
Candidate	Votes	%
James Pasternak	6,210	62.27%
Mitchell Worsoff	1,940	19.45%
Donna Khaner	1,077	10.80%
Frank Bonavota	745	7.48%
Total	9,972	100%
