= 2010 budget of the municipal government of Toronto =

2010 Budget of the Toronto Municipal Government
- Presented: April 15, 2010
- Total revenue: C $9.214 billion
- Total expenditures: C $9.214 billion
- Website: http://www.toronto.ca/budget2010/ www.toronto.ca/budget2010/

Toronto's operating municipal budget for 2010 was approved by the Toronto City Council on April 15, 2010. The budget maintained city services, and increased the property tax by "1.8% on total tax base".

== Revenues ==
- Property Taxes - C$3.5 billion (38%)
- Provincial Grants & Subsidies - C$1.9 billion (20%)
- Other Revenues - C$1.6 billion (17%)
- User Fees - C$1.4 billion (15%)
- Reserves/Reserve Funds - C$ 0.4 billion (5%)
- MLTT/PVT - C$0.2 billion (3%)
- Federal Grants & Subsidies - C$0.2 billion (2%)

== Expenditures ==
- Administration & Other - C$1.85 billion (20.1%)
- Toronto Transit Commission - C$1.5 billion (15.8%)
- Toronto Employment and Social Services Division - C$1.4 billion (14.7%)
- Toronto Police Service - C$956.2 million (10.4%)
- Toronto Shelter, Support & Housing Administration Division - C$854.7 million (9.3%)
- Debt Charges - C$430.3 million (4.7%)
- Toronto Children's Services Division - C$378.7 million (4.1%)
- Toronto Fire Services - 371.7 million (4.0%)
- Toronto Parks, Forestry and Recreation Division - C$359.9 million (3.9%)
- Transportation Services - C$285 million (3.1%)
- Toronto Public Health - C$219.5 million (2.4%)
- Toronto Public Library - C$180.6 million (2.0%)
- Toronto EMS - C$165.3 million (1.8%)
- Toronto Municipal Licensing and Standards - C$50.2 million (0.5%)
- Toronto City Planning - C$36.2 million (0.4%)
- Toronto Economic Development and Culture Division- C$35.9 million (0.4%)

== See also ==
- City of Toronto government
