= Case Ootes =

Canadian politician

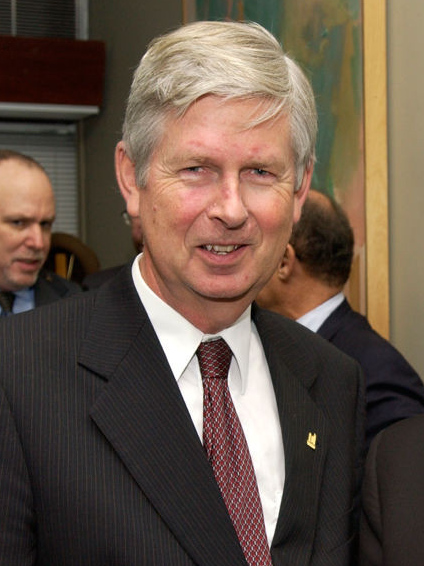
- Ootes in 2003

Toronto City Councillor for Ward 29 Toronto—Danforth
- In office 2000–2010
- Preceded by: New ward
- Succeeded by: Mary Fragedakis

Toronto City Councillor for Ward 1 East York
- In office 1998–2000 Serving with Michael Prue
- Preceded by: New ward
- Succeeded by: Ward abolished

Deputy Mayor of Toronto
- In office 1998–2003
- Preceded by: Vacant seat
- Succeeded by: Joe Pantalone

Personal details
- Born: 1941 (age 84–85) Schagen, Netherlands
- Occupation: Businessman

Case Ootes (born 1941) is a retired Canadian politician who was the deputy mayor of Toronto from 1998 to 2003. On Toronto City Council, Ootes represented East York's Ward 29 Broadview—Greenwood. He was first elected in the 1990s and served on council through the 1998 amalgamation until 2010.

== Background ==
Ootes was born in a village northwest of Amsterdam in the Netherlands, and he and his family immigrated to Canada in 1952 when he was eleven. Settling near Renfrew, Ontario, his father worked as a miner and the family lived in a log cabin.

Ootes obtained a Master of Business Administration degree from York University, and served several years as an executive with Imperial Oil. There, he became friends with Dave Johnson, and when Johnson became involved in Tory politics so did Ootes.

In 2005, Ootes was named executive-in-residence in the Centre for Financial Services of Seneca College, Newnham Campus. He now serves on the board of governors at Seneca.

His brother Jake Ootes is a former Member of the Legislative Assembly in the Northwest Territories.

== Politics ==
Johnson was elected mayor of East York, and in 1988, he convinced Ootes to run for city council. In 1992, Ootes retired from Imperial Oil to become a full-time politician. Two years later, he was elected to the council of Metropolitan Toronto.

When Toronto and five suburban municipalities were amalgamated in 1998, he was appointed deputy mayor of the new city of Toronto, and held that position until 2003. In that role, he was widely seen as the second only to the mayor in power and influence. While Lastman relished publicity and spectacle, Ootes worked quietly and effectively to advance the mayor's initiatives, putting together ever-changing council majorities from day to day.

In the 2000 municipal election, he faced what was thought would be a serious challenge from school board chair Gail Nyberg. The election mostly focused on Ootes' strong support of a scheme to ship Toronto's garbage to the Adams Mine, an abandoned mine outside of Kirkland Lake, Ontario. Liberal Party supporters supported Nyberg but Ootes had the strong support of the mayor and several other city councillors, and won re-election by 7,660 votes to 4,391.

Ootes was widely considered one of the likely candidates to succeed Lastman. However the Conservative money and supporters mostly went towards former Rogers Cable President & CEO John Tory, and Ootes chose not to run. The left-leaning David Miller narrowly defeated Tory in the 2003 election to become mayor. Ootes was replaced as deputy mayor by Joe Pantalone, Sandra Bussin, and Mike Feldman jointly for the next council term.

Since then, Ootes has served as the unofficial head of the councillors opposed to Miller's left-leaning initiatives. During his tenure on the police services board, Ootes and Justice Hugh Locke were instrumental in selecting the more centrist Bill Blair over Mike Boyd to succeed Julian Fantino as Police Chief.

Ootes ran in the 2006 municipal election with the slogan "Proven Leadership", defeating Diane Alexopoulos by twenty votes.

On July 16, 2007, Ootes voted with a majority of councillors (23-22) to defer voting on mayor Miller's proposed vehicle registration tax and land transfer tax until after the October 2007 provincial election. Ootes said this was a wakeup call to the city that citizens want more control of city spending. On October 22 council voted to support the new taxes (26-19). Ootes was among those who dissented. He argued that while his side lost the final vote, they had won the public opinion debate.

Ootes announced in January 2010 that he would not run for re-election after his term ending. After the 2010 Toronto municipal elections, mayor-elect Rob Ford selected Ootes to chair his transition team.
