= David Shiner (politician) =

Canadian politician

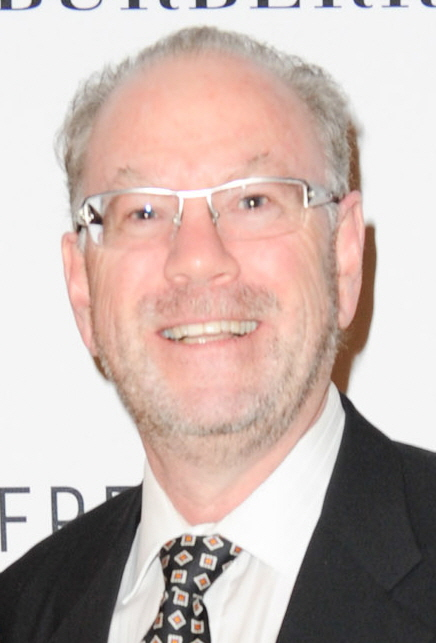

Toronto City Councillor for (Ward 24) Willowdale
- In office December 1, 2000 – December 1, 2018
- Preceded by: Ward Created
- Succeeded by: John Filion

Toronto City Councilor for Ward 12
- In office January 1, 1998 – December 1, 2000
- Preceded by: Ward created
- Succeeded by: Ward abolished

Personal details
- Occupation: Businessman

David Shiner was a city councillor in Toronto, Ontario, Canada. He represented ward 24, one of the two wards in Willowdale.

== Background ==
David Shiner is one of the four children of Esther and Sol Shiner. His mother served on the borough and later city council of the City of North York as alderman, and later as a member of the Board of Control and Deputy Mayor. Before entering politics, David Shiner ran a clothing company.

== North York council ==
He was first elected to North York city council in 1991, defeating incumbent Bob Bradley, being the only candidate to oust an incumbent in the election. In 1994, he opposed a plan by Metro's Separate School Board to consolidate storage of 18,000 gallons of PCBs in North York. The plan was approved by Ontario's Ministry of the Environment against the wishes of the city.

== Toronto council ==
When North York was merged with six other municipalities and a regional government to form the new City of Toronto, Shiner was elected to Toronto City Council in 1997. He was the only councillor to oppose a proposal to use both Metro Hall (the former headquarters of Metropolitan Toronto) and Toronto City Hall as the new municipal headquarters, instead advocating that the government be based at the North York Civic Centre.

Shiner was considered one of the closest allies of the new city's first mayor, Mel Lastman (who had previously served as Mayor of North York). In 2000, Lastman appointed him to the position of the city's budget chief, replacing the retiring Tom Jakobek.

A member of the Progressive Conservative Party of Ontario, he is regarded as moderately to the right of centre. With the election of David Miller as mayor, Shiner was succeeded as budget chief by David Soknacki.

In 2007, at North York community council, Shiner tabled a successful motion asking Toronto council to stop its plan to close community centres on Mondays and delay the opening of ice rinks. It passed 9-1, as Howard Moscoe and John Filion who were allies of the mayor voted for Shiner's motion, with Shelley Carroll as the lone dissenter. Miller had directed City Manager Shirley Hoy to implement $34 million in service cuts to the 2007 budget in August 2007 without seeking council approval, arguing that it addressed a financial shortfall. An arbitrator later ruled that the library closures violated the collective bargaining agreement with the union.

On January 9, 2009, Shiner boycotted a meeting of the Licensing and Standards Committee. Shiner, who was recently appointed to this committee, described by some as a second-tier committee, refused to attend the meeting in protest for not receiving any of his preferred appointments on other committees. Two other committee members, Mike Feldman and Denzil Minnan-Wong, had already sent their regrets so the remaining committee members' presence was required for quorum, and Shiner's boycott meant that the meeting was adjourned to the following month. Shiner criticized Mayor David Miller's leadership style, saying "I find it very disappointing that the mayor has pushed this council into different camps, and rewards those who blindly support him and tries to punish those who don't." The chair of the committee, Howard Moscoe was not amused. "The business of the city has to go on, and childish refusals to attend are not very appropriate," Moscoe said. Shiner had previously never missed a committee meeting in his 17 years in municipal politics.

In 2013, Shiner was notably the only city councillor to vote with both Toronto Mayor Rob Ford and brother Doug Ford against limiting the mayor's powers after he was caught smoking crack. Shiner was quoted as saying Rob Ford has "done a reasonable job."

He was re-elected in 2014.

== Provincial politics ==
Shiner ran unsuccessfully for a seat in the provincial legislature to represent Willowdale in the 2007 provincial general election. The Toronto Star criticized him for not resigning his council seat. Shiner lost to Liberal incumbent David Zimmer by 5,647 votes.

== Controversy ==
For at least 5 years, while a city councillor, Shiner was also a registered federal lobbyist for MCW, a company that had received $7.6 million in city contracts and was competing for several million dollars in city contracts.

Some have argued that there is nothing illegal about being a Federal lobbyist while also being a city councillor, while some critics have pointed out that because councillors receive full-time pay, it is legitimate to question why he held a second job and 7 lobbyist registrations. Moreover, according to the Toronto Star, "Shiner (Ward 24) listed his city-owned cellphone in the lobbyist registrations and billed taxpayers for more than $5,000 in cellphone costs during the time he was registered as a lobbyist; Shiner said none of those costs were related to lobbying."

Shiner's lobbyist registrations all listed 11th-floor apartment (88 Erskine Avenue) which itself has also been a source of controversy. Specifically, the Canadian Broadcasting Corporation (CBC) reported that Shiner and another city councillor (Councillor Giorgio Mamolotti) both received a "hefty" rent discounts at that address for their rental apartments compared to other tenants in the same building, from a real estate development and management company (Greenwin-Verdiroc Group) that did millions of dollars of business with the City of Toronto. The same article reported that neither Shiner, Mamolotti, or Greenwin-Verdiroc were willing to answer questions regarding the favorable rent discount.

In 2018, it was reported that David Shiner led an effort to name a city street "Karen's Way" after his life partner and once executive assistant Karen Wood. This follows him leading the effort to name another street after her, Woodsy Park Lane and another city street after his mother, Ester Shiner as Esther Shiner Boulevard. This has raised questions about whether it is appropriate for a city politician to use his position to name streets not in the people's interest but according to his own interests.

== Election results ==
2014 Toronto election, Ward 24
Candidate	Votes	%
David Shiner	10,716	55.172
Dan Fox	5,649	29.084
Randy Ai	1,299	6.688
Michael Galea	1,098	5.653
Daniela Acerra	661	3.403
Total	19423	100

2010 Toronto election, Ward 24
Candidate	Votes	%
David Shiner	10,523	58.4
Sonny Cho	4,986	27.7
Eugene Loo	1,611	8.9
Bob Nahiddi	903	5.0
Total	18,023	100

2007 Ontario general election
Party	Candidate	Votes	%	±%
Liberal	David Zimmer	21,065	47.7	
Progressive Conservative	David Shiner	15,418	34.9	
New Democratic	Rini Ghosh	3,755	8.5	
Green	Torbjorn Zetterlund	2,920	6.6	
Libertarian	Heath Thomas	469	1.1	
Family Coalition	Kristin Monster	405	0.9	
Independent	Charles Roddy Sutherland	121	0.3	

2006 Toronto election, Ward 24
Candidate	Votes	%
David Shiner	6,930	54.1
Ed Shiller	3,768	29.4
Sanaz Amirpour	1,329	10.4
Colleen Ladd	789	6.2
