= John Parker (Canadian politician) =

Canadian politician (born c. 1954)

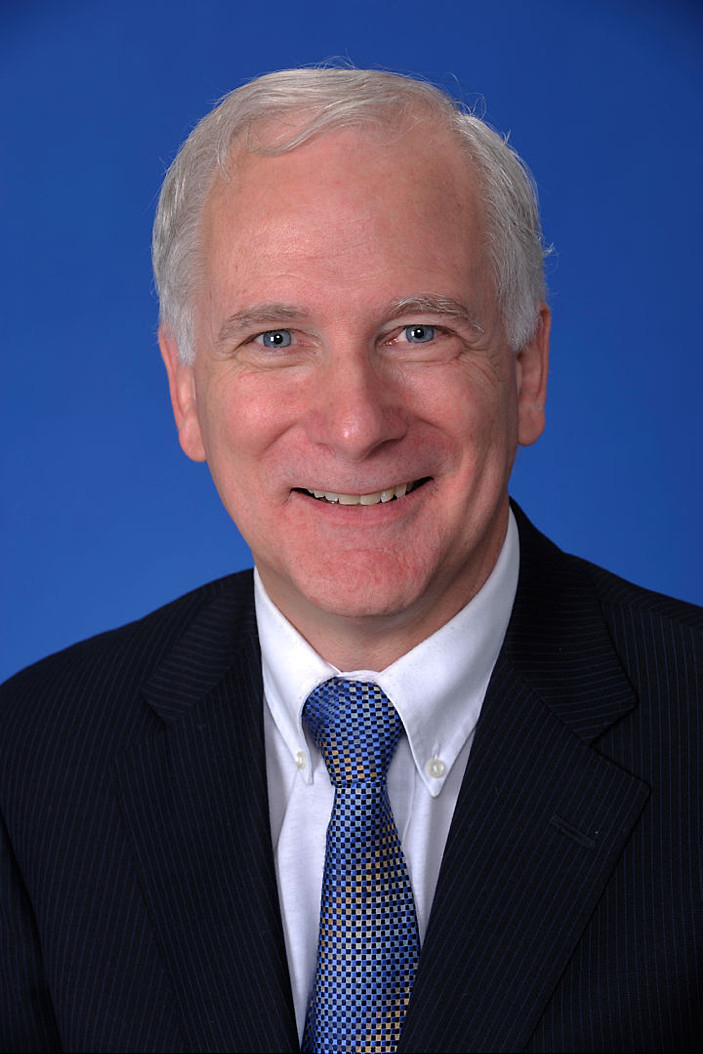
- Parker in 2010

Deputy Speaker of Toronto City Council
- In office December 1, 2010 – December 1, 2014
- Preceded by: Gloria Lindsay Luby
- Succeeded by: Shelley Carroll

Toronto City Councillor for Ward 26 (Don Valley West)
- In office December 1, 2006 – December 1, 2014
- Preceded by: Jane Pitfield
- Succeeded by: Jon Burnside

Ontario MPP
- In office June 8, 1995 – June 2, 1999
- Preceded by: Gary Malkowski
- Succeeded by: Riding abolished
- Constituency: York East

Personal details
- Born: John Locke Parker; 1954 (age 71–72) Toronto, Ontario, Canada
- Party: Progressive Conservative
- Spouse: Beth Parker
- Children: 5
- Profession: Lawyer

John Locke Parker (born c. 1954) is a Canadian retired lawyer and former politician in Ontario. He was a Progressive Conservative member of the Legislative Assembly of Ontario for York East from 1995 to 1999. He subsequently served from 2006 to 2014 as a Toronto City Councillor for Ward 26 (Don Valley West), which included the neighbourhoods of Leaside and Flemingdon Park. From 2010 to 2014, he was Deputy Speaker of Toronto City Council.

== Background ==
Parker graduated from the University of Toronto, then Osgoode Hall Law School in 1980, after which he worked as a lawyer. After moving to the Leaside area, he became active in the community and was a founding member of the board of the Bessborough Child Care Centre. He has coached community baseball, soccer and hockey teams. He served on the board of the Leaside Hockey Rink and chaired the East York Committee of Adjustment.

In 2001, Parker helped found the Ontario Association of Former Parliamentarians. The association's objectives include offering experience in support of parliamentary democracy in a non-partisan way and fostering good relations between current members. Parker serves on the board of directors of the Churchill Society for the Advancement of Parliamentary Democracy, a non-partisan, charitable organization that facilitates education, discussion and debate about Canada's parliamentary democracy.

== Provincial politics ==
Parker was elected to the Ontario legislature in the 1995 provincial election, defeating incumbent New Democrat Gary Malkowski by 3,263 votes in the riding of York East. He served in Mike Harris's government for the next four years. During most of that time, he was Parliamentary Assistant to the Minister Responsible for Native Affairs.

In 1996, the Harris government reduced the number of provincial ridings from 130 to 103. This change resulted in some sitting MPPs having to compete against one another in the 1999 provincial election. Parker ran against Liberal Mike Colle in the newly created riding of Eglinton—Lawrence and was defeated by 11,307 votes. Colle received 56.85 percent of the popular vote compared to Parker's 29.72 percent.

== Municipal politics ==
In 2006, Parker was elected as the City Councillor for Toronto's Ward 26. In a field of 15 candidates, Parker prevailed by a margin of 215 votes over runner-up Mohamed Dhanani. Parker received a total of 3,369 votes, which amounted to just 20% of the popular vote. In 2008, the Toronto Environmental Alliance issued Parker an "F" grade for what they perceived to be an egregious voting record in 2007–2008. While he was widely considered to be a right-wing councillor, Parker received poor performance grades from the editorial boards of traditionally conservative newspapers in Ontario. The National Post and Toronto Sun gave Parker "C" grades in "report cards" these outlets issued for Toronto City Councillors in 2007 and 2010 respectively. On November 21, 2011, the Toronto Sun scored Councillor Parker an "A+". On November 18, 2012, the Toronto Taxpayer Coalition report card gave a rating of "B".

In 2010, Parker was re-elected in Ward 26. He tallied the most votes in a three-way race between previous contender Dhanani and newcomer Jon Burnside. The Toronto Sun supported Parker, giving him the recommendation as "a hard-wired East Yorker, who brings a conservative ethic and is not easily panicked." He was selected to be Deputy Speaker in December 2010.

On October 27, 2014, Parker was defeated by Jon Burnside during the 2014 municipal election. He was the only incumbent to be defeated in that election.

== Election results ==
2014 Toronto election, Ward 23
Candidate	Votes	%
Jon Burnside	9,415	42.73%
John Parker	6,167	27.99%
Ishrath Velshi	3,055	13.86%
David Sparrow	1,786	8.11%
Wasim Vania	1,033	4.69%
Dimitre Popov	578	2.62%
Total	22,034	100.00%

2010 Toronto election, Ward 26
Candidate	Votes	%
John Parker	6,203	31.3
Jon Burnside	5,788	29.2
Mohamed Dhanani	5,627	28.4
Yunus Pandor	1,452	7.3
Tanvir Ahmed	377	1.9
Shaukat Malik	216	1.1
Nawab Salim Khan	169	0.9
Total	19,832	100

Unofficial results as of October 26, 2010 03:55 am

2006 Toronto election, Ward 26
Candidate	Votes	%
John Parker	3,369	20.1
Mohamed Dhanani	3,155	18.8
Abdul Ingar	2,940	17.6
Geoff Kettel	1,372	8.2
Natalie Maniates	1,336	8.0
David Thomas	1,095	6.5
John Masterson	887	5.3
Michele Carroll-Smith	743	4.4
Debbie Lechter	577	3.4
Csaba Vegh	371	2.2
Muhammad Alam	261	1.6
Fred Williams	256	1.5
Bahar Aminvaziri	215	1.3
Orhan Aybars	99	0.6
Raza Jabbar	76	0.5
