= Mike Feldman =

Canadian politician (1927–2023)

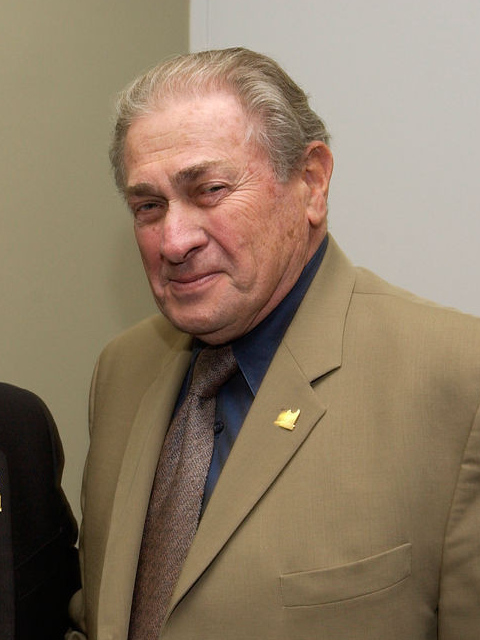
- Feldman in 2003

City Councillor for Ward 10 (York Centre)
- In office 2000–2010
- Preceded by: New ward
- Succeeded by: James Pasternak

Deputy Mayor of Toronto
- In office 2003–2006 Serving with Joe Pantalone & Sandra Bussin
- Preceded by: Case Ootes
- Succeeded by: Joe Pantalone

City Councillor for Ward 8 - North York Spadina
- In office 1998–2000 Serving with Howard Moscoe
- Preceded by: New ward
- Succeeded by: Ward abolished

North York Councillor for Ward 7
- In office 1992–1997
- Preceded by: Irv Chapley
- Succeeded by: Position abolished

Personal details
- Born: December 29, 1927
- Died: May 10, 2023 (aged 95)
- Spouse: Sue
- Children: 3
- Occupation: Businessman

Michael C. Feldman (December 29, 1927 – May 10, 2023) was a Canadian politician in Toronto, Ontario. He was a municipal councillor from 1992 to 2010, and served as deputy mayor from 2003 to 2006.

== Background ==
Before entering municipal politics, Feldman was a businessman who founded Teela Data Management, a company specializing in real estate information, which was sold to Moore Corporation Ltd. in 1982. He retired from business in 1988.

Feldman served as president of the Beth Emeth Bais Yehuda Synagogue and of the Ontario Region of the United Synagogue of America, the central organization of synagogues in Conservative Judaism. He was active with the Canadian Council of Christians and Jews.

Feldman and his wife, Sue, had three children. He died on May 10, 2023, at the age of 95.

== Politics ==
Feldman was elected in 1992 in a by-election to North York council to replace longtime councillor Irv Chapley who had died in office early in the year. In addition to his job as a municipal councillor, he served as chair of the Metro Housing Development Corporation, a public housing agency serving the second-tier municipality of Metropolitan Toronto. In 1997 he was elected to the newly amalgamated Toronto City Council.

Feldman was a longtime supporter of Mel Lastman, the generally conservative mayor first of North York, then of the merged Toronto until 2003. In that year's municipal election, Feldman supported John Tory, a moderate conservative, for mayor. When David Miller, a social democrat, was elected, one of his first appointments was to name Feldman one of his three Deputy Mayors, jointly with Joe Pantalone and Sandra Bussin.

Along with the appointment of fellow councillor David Soknacki as budget chief, Feldman’s appointment was seen as a key outreach to conservatives on the new mayor’s part. The left-wing alternative weekly newspaper ‘’Now‘’ magazine wrote that “Miller has long respected Feldman’s financial acumen and his commitment to neighbourhood issues. The retired business executive is a straight-shooting conservative who can get along with both sides at council and give North York a high-profile voice at City Hall.”

After the 2006 election, Miller appointed a single deputy mayor, Pantalone. In 2009, Feldman joined the Responsible Government Group, a conservative caucus seen as an unofficial opposition to Miller and the centre-left majority of council.

== Electoral history ==
2006 Toronto municipal election: Councillor, Ward Ten
Candidate	Votes	%
Mike Feldman (incumbent)	6,527	51.95
Igor Toutchinski	1,940	15.44
Magda Berkovits	1,586	12.62
Max Royz	1,106	8.80
Robert Freedland	561	4.47
Craig Smith	440	3.50
Alex Dumalag	404	3.22
Total valid votes	12,564	100.00

2003 Toronto municipal election: Councillor, Ward Ten
Candidate	Votes	%
Mike Feldman (incumbent)	9,962	73.84
Lorne Berg	3,530	26.16
Total valid votes	13,492	100.00

2000 Toronto municipal election: Councillor, Ward Ten
Candidate	Votes	%
Mike Feldman (incumbent)	12,221	81.98
Lorne Berg	2,687	18.02
Total valid votes	14,908	100.00

1997 Toronto municipal election: Councillor, Ward Eight (two members elected)
Candidate	Votes	%
(x)Howard Moscoe	16,187	35.74
(x)Mike Feldman	14,737	32.54
Frank Di Giorgio	11,487	25.36
Henry Braverman	1,572	3.47
Nickeisha Hudson	923	2.04
Roy Dzeko	383	0.85
Total valid votes	45,289	100.00
