= Mike Del Grande =

Canadian politician (born 1953)

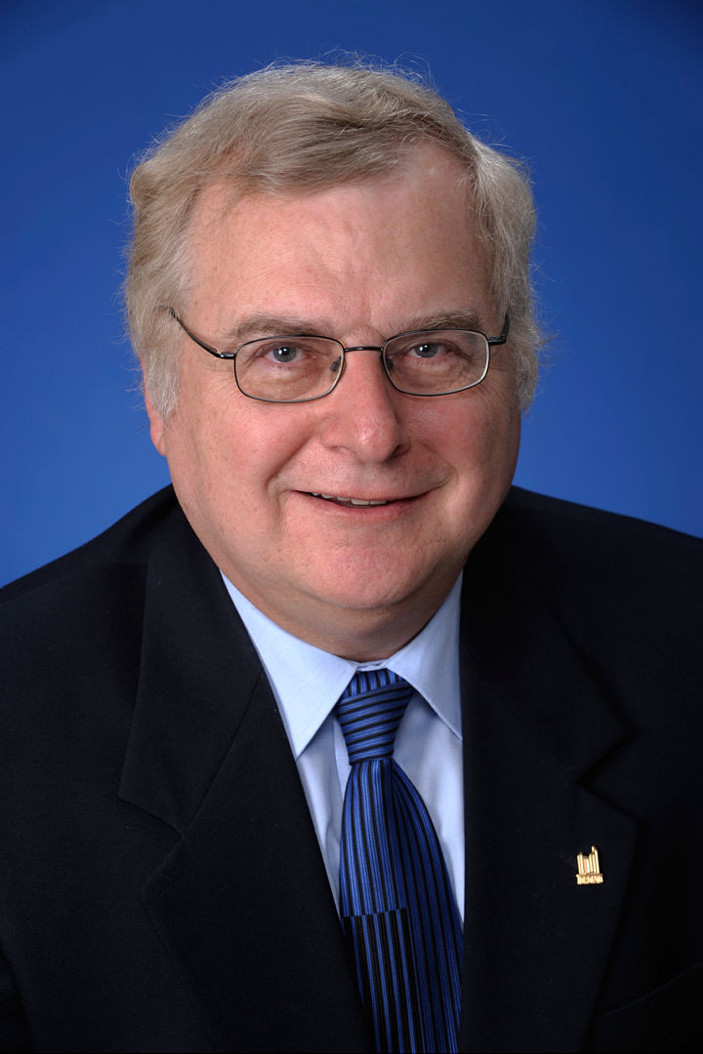
- Del Grande in 2010

Toronto City Councillor for Ward 39 Scarborough—Agincourt
- In office December 1, 2003 – December 1, 2014
- Preceded by: Sherene Shaw
- Succeeded by: Jim Karygiannis

Chair of the Toronto Budget Committee
- In office December 1, 2010 – January 16, 2013
- Preceded by: Shelley Carroll
- Succeeded by: Frank Di Giorgio

Chair of the Scarborough Community Council
- In office December 1, 2008 – December 1, 2010
- Preceded by: Norm Kelly
- Succeeded by: Paul Ainslie

Chair of the Toronto Catholic District School Board
- In office December 1, 2014 – November 30, 2015
- Preceded by: Jo-Ann Davis
- Succeeded by: Angela Kennedy

Toronto Catholic School Trustee for Ward 7
- Incumbent
- Assumed office December 1, 2014
- Preceded by: John Del Grande

Toronto Catholic School Trustee
- In office January 1, 1998 – December 1, 2003
- Preceded by: Ward created
- Succeeded by: John Del Grande

Metropolitan Toronto Separate School Trustee for Ward 18
- In office December 1, 1994 – January 1, 1998
- Preceded by: Lynda Sacco
- Succeeded by: City amalgamated

Personal details
- Born: Michael Anthony Del Grande; November 5, 1953 (age 73) Toronto, Ontario, Canada
- Spouse: Beverly Del Grande
- Children: 3
- Education: University of Toronto
- Occupation: Chartered accountant

Michael Anthony Del Grande (born November 5, 1953) is a Canadian politician and former Toronto city councillor. He represented Ward 39 Scarborough—Agincourt on Toronto City Council from 2003 to 2014 and served as chair of the city's Budget Committee from 2010 to 2013. He subsequently returned to the Toronto Catholic District School Board (TCDSB), where he has represented Ward 7 Scarborough—Agincourt since 2014. Del Grande did not seek re-election in the 2026 Toronto municipal election.

In 2026, the Ontario College of Teachers found Del Grande guilty of professional misconduct arising from remarks he made during a 2019 TCDSB meeting concerning proposed protections for gender identity and gender expression. In August 2026, he agreed to surrender his teaching certificate and never reapply for membership in the College. He was also publicly reprimanded, fined $5,000 and ordered to pay $80,000 toward the College's costs.

== Early life and education ==
Del Grande was born and raised in Toronto, Ontario, in the Danforth neighbourhood. He is the eldest child of Italian immigrants. He attended Holy Cross and St. Aloysius Catholic schools, Neil McNeil High School and East York Collegiate Institute.

Del Grande received a Bachelor of Commerce and Finance degree from the University of Toronto in 1976 and became a member of the Canadian Institute of Chartered Accountants in 1979. He later received a master's degree in theological studies from St. Augustine's Seminary in 2000 and a Bachelor of Education from the University of Toronto in 2002. He became a member of the Ontario College of Teachers that year.

He is married to Beverly Del Grande and has three children.

== Political career ==
=== Toronto City Council ===
In 2003, Del Grande ran for Toronto City Council and defeated longtime incumbent Sherene Shaw. He was an active participant in the "Keep the Chief" campaign in 2004, when Julian Fantino, then Toronto's chief of police, did not have his contract renewed by the Toronto Police Services Board.

In December 2004, during a tour of his ward with Scarborough Mirror reporter David Nickle, Del Grande discussed demographic changes in Scarborough—Agincourt and difficulties in establishing a sense of community and trust in local services as longtime residents moved away and newly arrived immigrants moved into the area. Del Grande said, "What's happening here is a lot of the white people are moving out."

During his 2006 re-election campaign, Del Grande was charged with assault following an incident involving a volunteer working for rival candidate John Wong. Del Grande accused the woman of removing his campaign flyers from an apartment building and prevented her from leaving until police arrived. The charge against Del Grande was withdrawn in February 2007.

Del Grande was re-elected in 2006 and 2010. Following the election of Rob Ford as mayor, Del Grande became chair of Toronto's Budget Committee.

In January 2012, Del Grande opposed funding for breakfast programs for children from low-income families, stating that parents who have children should take responsibility for them. Housing advocate Michael Shapcott characterized the remarks as an example of "blaming the victim".

Del Grande resigned as Budget Committee chair in January 2013. He did not seek re-election to city council in 2014 and instead ran for the Toronto Catholic District School Board.

== School trustee ==
=== 1994–2003 ===
Del Grande was first elected as a separate school trustee in 1994. He was re-elected in 1997 and 2000 and served as chair of the school board from 2000 to 2001.

In 1996, the Ontario English Catholic Teachers' Association filed a complaint under Ontario labour law alleging that Del Grande had bargained in bad faith by using local media to influence public opinion while the school board was negotiating with its teachers. The complaint was subsequently dropped after he agreed to cease and desist.

Del Grande left the board in 2003 to run successfully for Toronto City Council. His son John Del Grande succeeded him as trustee.

=== 2014–2026 ===
Del Grande returned to the Toronto Catholic District School Board in the 2014 Toronto municipal election, succeeding his son John, who did not seek re-election. Del Grande was re-elected in the 2018 and 2022 municipal elections. He served as chair of the board from 2014 to 2015.

Del Grande did not seek another term in the 2026 Toronto municipal election.

=== 2019 Code of Conduct controversy ===
On November 7, 2019, during discussions about amending the TCDSB's Code of Conduct to add gender identity, gender expression, family status and marital status as specifically protected categories, Del Grande proposed an amendment containing a list of additional terms, including bestiality, pedophilia, gerontophilia and paraphilia. He later said that he intended the amendment as a "slippery slope" argument against the proposed changes. His comments prompted criticism from other trustees, LGBTQ advocates and then-Toronto mayor John Tory, as well as calls for Del Grande to apologize or resign.

Following complaints about Del Grande's conduct, the board commissioned an investigation. A report by lawyer Michelle Bird concluded that he had violated the board's Trustee Code of Conduct, and the board subsequently censured him.

Del Grande sought judicial review of the board's decisions. The Divisional Court dismissed his application in 2023, and the Court of Appeal for Ontario dismissed his appeal in October 2024.

=== Ontario College of Teachers proceedings ===
The 2019 controversy also resulted in disciplinary proceedings before the Ontario College of Teachers. Del Grande had become a certified member of the College in 2002 but had never worked as a classroom teacher.

The College proceedings concerned two incidents in 2019. The first arose from a September board meeting at which a student trustee objected to an anti-abortion film proposed for use in schools. Del Grande was alleged to have rolled his eyes, sighed and told the student, "You've been brainwashed by the liberals." The Discipline Committee found his behaviour toward the student inappropriate but concluded that it did not rise to the level of professional misconduct.

In a decision released on April 8, 2026, the Discipline Committee found Del Grande guilty of professional misconduct over his remarks during the November 2019 Code of Conduct debate. The panel found that the manner in which he expressed his opposition was disgraceful, dishonourable or unprofessional and constituted conduct unbecoming a member.

Del Grande argued that his proposed amendment constituted political hyperbole intended to illustrate a slippery-slope argument. He also argued that the College lacked jurisdiction because he had been acting as an elected school trustee rather than as a teacher. The panel rejected the jurisdictional argument, finding that because Del Grande maintained his teaching certification he remained subject to the College's professional standards. It also concluded that although the disciplinary proceedings limited his freedom of expression under the Canadian Charter of Rights and Freedoms, the limitation was justified.

At a penalty hearing on August 26, 2026, the Discipline Committee accepted a joint submission under which Del Grande agreed to surrender his teaching certificate and never reapply for membership in the College. The committee also imposed a public reprimand and a $5,000 fine and ordered him to pay $80,000 toward the College's prosecution costs within two years.

The disciplinary hearing had begun in late 2022 and extended over 16 hearing days. College counsel Danielle Miller attributed its length in part to what she described as a "shotgun approach" by Del Grande's lawyer involving several unsuccessful legal arguments. In presenting the joint submission, College counsel identified as mitigating factors Del Grande's lack of previous disciplinary proceedings since becoming a member in 2002 and the fact that the misconduct finding arose from a single incident involving remarks directed at fellow trustees rather than students. Aggravating factors included the public setting of the remarks, their effect on a vulnerable and marginalized group within the Catholic school community, and Del Grande's failure to apologize.

Del Grande told the panel that he accepted the proposed penalty because he no longer had the resources to continue contesting the case and was dealing with a serious family situation. He said that he had suffered stress and health consequences during the proceedings and maintained that he had been attempting to defend the Catholic faith.

=== Anti-abortion motion ===
On March 21, 2024, Del Grande introduced a motion to fly the International Pro-Life flag at all TCDSB schools during May. The motion also proposed encouraging TCDSB staff and students to attend the annual National March for Life and teaching students who did not attend the march about the Catholic Church's teachings on abortion.

The proposal was supported by the Campaign Life Coalition. The board defeated the motion by a vote of 8–2.

== Election results ==
=== School board ===
2014 Toronto election Catholic District School Board; Trustee – Ward 7
Candidate	Votes	%
Mike Del Grande	8,108	64.085%
Leo Ng	1,794	14.180%
Emmanuel Yanga	1,409	11.137%
Aldo Calla	1,341	10.599%
Total	12,652	100%

Unofficial results as of October 27, 2014 11:51 PM

=== City Council ===
2010 Toronto election, Ward 39
Candidate	Votes	%
Mike Del Grande	9,931	68.18%
Kevin Xu	3,640	24.99%
Caldwell Williams	994	6.82%
Total	14,565	100%

2010 City Clerk's Official Declaration of Results

2006 Toronto election, Ward 39
Candidate	Votes	%
Mike Del Grande	7,964	68.2
John Wong	1,888	16.2
Wayne Cook	660	5.6
Lushan Lu	614	5.3
Sunshine Smith	365	3.1
Samuel Kung	194	1.7
Total	11,685	100%

2006 City Clerk's Official Declaration of Results

2003 Toronto election, Ward 39
Candidate	Votes	%
Mike Del Grande	6,299	51.6
Sherene Shaw (Incumbent)	5,898	48.4
Total	12,197	100%

2003 City Clerk's Official Declaration of Results
