= Speaker of Toronto City Council =

- Municipal wordmark

- Incumbent; Ausma Malik since November 18, 2026
- Toronto City Council
- Style: Speaker
- Reports to: Toronto City Council
- Seat: Toronto City Hall
- Appointer: Direct election; by members of Toronto City Council
- Term length: 4 years; renewable
- Inaugural holder: Sandra Bussin
- Formation: 2006
- Website: www.toronto.ca/council

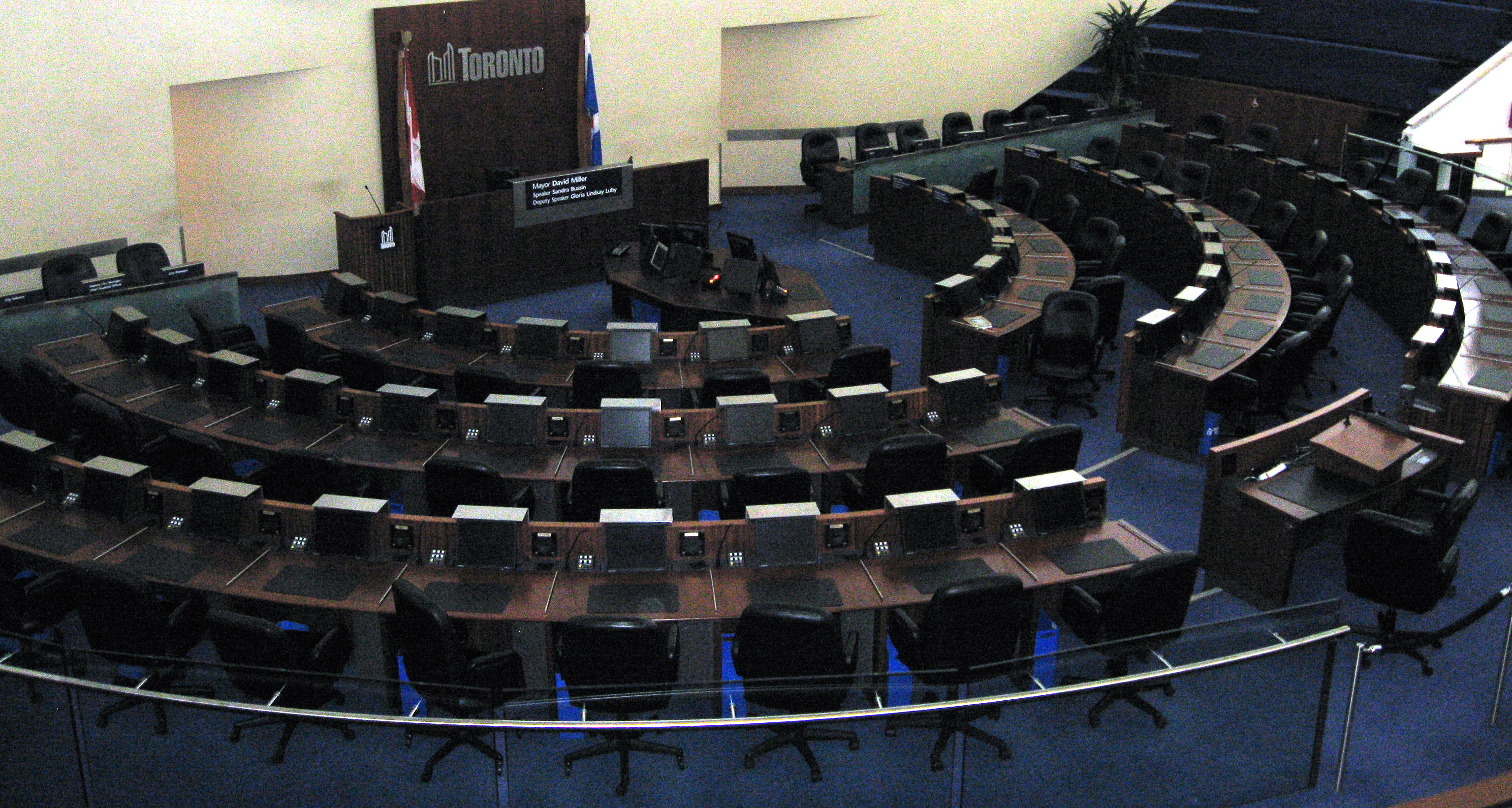
Toronto City Council chamber

The speaker of Toronto City Council is the presiding officer for regular meetings of Toronto City Council. The speaker and a deputy speaker are elected by city council from among its members. Statutorily, the mayor of Toronto is head of council and retains the right to chair council meetings, however, the mayor typically does so on a ceremonial basis, such as during the first council meeting of a term.

== Role ==
While municipal council meetings in Ontario are traditionally chaired by the head of council (e.g. mayor, warden, reeve or regional chair), the City of Toronto Act allows Toronto City Council to appoint another member as a presiding officer, with the written consent of the head of council. The election of the speaker and deputy speaker is authorized by Chapter 27 of the Toronto Municipal Code.

Unlike "speakers" in parliamentary assemblies, the council speaker has no other duties outside of presiding over meetings. The mayor is considered to be the head of council for all other purposes. The speaker does not earn any additional salary for the position. The speaker is precluded from serving as chair of a committee, the Toronto Transit Commission or the Toronto Police Services Board.

The position was recommended by the council-appointed three-member volunteer advisory panel and its report The City We Want – the Government We Need in 2005. Before recommendations from the report was accepted, the mayor was the presiding officer during council meetings.

The mayor retains the right to chair city council meetings and can take the chair at any time. However, in practice, this is reserved for ceremonial or other significant occasions, and the speaker and deputy speaker normally preside.

In the absence of the speaker or deputy speaker, the deputy mayor can also preside over a meeting of city council. The speaker and deputy speaker are elected for a four-year term and can only be removed by a two-thirds vote of city council.

== Speakers of Toronto City Council ==
No.	Image	Name	Speaker Term	Ward Term
1		Sandra Bussin	2006–2010	Ward 32 Beaches–East York (December 1, 2000 – December 1, 2010)
2		Frances Nunziata	2010–2026	Ward 11 York South—Weston (December 1, 2000 – December 1, 2018)
2		Frances Nunziata	2010–2026	Ward 5 York South—Weston (December 1, 2018 – November 15, 2026)
3		Ausma Malik	2026–present	Ward 10 Spadina—Fort York (November 15, 2022 – present)

== Deputy speakers of Toronto City Council ==
No.	Name	Term	Ward
1	Gloria Lindsay Luby	2006–2010	4 Etobicoke–Centre
2	John Parker	2010–2014	26 Don Valley West
3	Shelley Carroll	2014–April 2018	33 Don Valley East
4	Glenn De Baeremaeker	April 2018–December 2018	38 Scarborough Centre
5	Shelley Carroll	December 2018–November 2022	17 Don Valley North
6	Stephen Holyday	November 2022–August 2023	2 Etobicoke Centre
7	Paula Fletcher	August 2023–November 2026	14 Toronto—Danforth
8	Shelley Carroll	November 2026–present	17 Don Valley North
