= Frank Di Giorgio =

Canadian politician

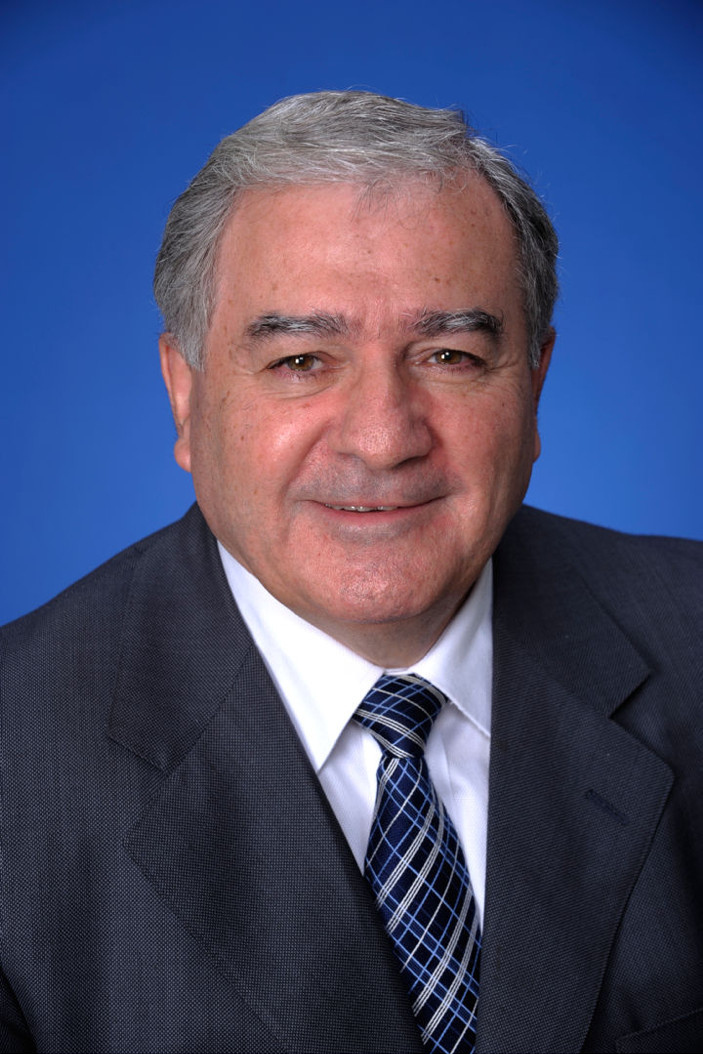
- Di Giorgio in 2010

Toronto City Councillor for Ward 12 York—South Weston
- In office December 1, 2000 – December 1, 2018
- Preceded by: Ward created
- Succeeded by: Ward dissolved

North York City Councillor for Ward 4
- In office December 1, 1985 – December 31, 1997
- Preceded by: Howard Moscoe
- Succeeded by: City amalgamated

Personal details
- Spouse: Mary
- Children: 2
- Occupation: Teacher

Frank Di Giorgio (/dɪˈdʒɔːrdʒoʊ/ dij-OR-joh, Italian: [di ˈdʒordʒo]) is a former Canadian politician. He sat on Toronto City Council and represented Ward 12 York South—Weston from 2000 to 2018. Prior to the amalgamation of Toronto, Di Giorgio was a member of the North York City Council from 1985 to 1997, representing Ward 4.

== Background ==
With a mathematics degree from McMaster University, Di Giorgio was a high school math teacher before entering politics.

== Political career ==
=== North York Council ===
Di Giorgio was elected as Ward 4 Councillor to North York's council in the 1985 Toronto election defeating Barb Shiner. He was a close ally of Mayor Mel Lastman.

During his time as a North York Councillor, Di Giorgio served as a member of the Executive Committee and chaired all major standing committees, including Works, Transportation, Planning Advisory, Library Board, Parks and Recreation, and Capital Planning.

=== Toronto City Council ===
In his role as Toronto city councillor, Di Giorgio was appointed budget chief under Mayor Rob Ford in 2013.

During the mayoralty of John Tory, he also held important Council committee positions. He was a member of the Executive Committee and sat on the Board of Directors for Toronto Community Housing Corporation (TCHC) as the Mayor's designate.

Di Giorgio ran for re-election as councillor in the newly formed Ward 5 York South—Weston in the 2018 Toronto election and lost to Frances Nunziata.

== Electoral record ==
2014 Toronto election, Ward 12
| Candidate | Votes | % |
| Frank DiGiorgio | 4,784 | 28.97% |
| John Nunziata | 4,546 | 27.53% |
| Nick Dominelli | 3,742 | 22.66% |
| Lekan Olawoye | 3,441 | 20.84% |
| Total | 16,513 | 100% |

2010 Toronto election, Ward 12
| Candidate | Votes | % |
|---|---|---|
| Frank Di Giorgio | 3,636 | 27.1 |
| Nick Dominelli | 3,214 | 23.9 |
| Steve Tasses | 2,748 | 20.4 |
| Vilma Filici | 2,204 | 16.4 |
| Richard Gosling | 1,073 | 8.0 |
| Joe Renda | 343 | 2.6 |
| Angelo Bellavia | 221 | 1.6 |
| Total | 13,439 | 100 |

Unofficial results as of October 26, 2010 03:55 am

2006 Toronto municipal election: Councillor, Ward Twelve
| Candidate | Votes | % |
|---|---|---|
| (x)Frank Di Giorgio | 4,980 | 48.19 |
| Nick Dominelli | 2,725 | 26.37 |
| Joe Renda | 1,419 | 13.73 |
| Keith Sweeney | 1,054 | 10.20 |
| Michel Dugré | 157 | 1.52 |
| Total valid votes | 10,335 | 100 |
Source: Declaration of Results of Voting; Monday, November 13, 2006, City of Toronto.
