= Ward 9 Davenport =

Municipal council district in Toronto, Ontario, Canada

- Constituency for the Toronto City Council
- Location of Ward 9 in Toronto
- City: Toronto
- Population: 108,470 (2016)

Current constituency
- Created: 2018
- Councillor: Alejandra Bravo
- Community council: Toronto/East York
- Created from: Ward 17; Ward 18
- First contested: 2018 election
- Last contested: 2026 election
- Ward profile: www.toronto.ca/ward-9-davenport/

Ward 9 Davenport is a municipal electoral division in Toronto, Ontario, Canada that has been represented in the Toronto City Council since the 2018 municipal election. It was last contested in 2026, with Alejandra Bravo being elected councillor.

== Boundaries ==
On August 14, 2018, the Government of Ontario redrew municipal boundaries via the Better Local Government Act, 2018, S.O. 2018, c. 11 - Bill 5. This means that the 25 provincial electoral districts and the 25 municipal wards in Toronto currently share the same geographic borders.

Defined in legislation as:

Consisting of that part of the City of Toronto described as follows: commencing at the intersection of Eglinton Avenue West with Dufferin Street; thence southerly along said street to Rogers Road; thence easterly along said road to Oakwood Avenue; thence southerly along said avenue to Holland Park Avenue; thence easterly along said avenue to Winona Drive; thence generally southerly along said drive to Davenport Road; thence westerly along said road to Ossington Avenue; thence southerly along said avenue to Dundas Street West; thence westerly along said street to Dovercourt Road; thence southerly along said road and its production to the GO Transit Railway; thence generally northwesterly along said railway to the southerly production of Keele Street; thence northerly along said production and Keele Street to Lavender Road; thence easterly along said road to Old Weston Road; thence northwesterly along said road to Rogers Road; thence easterly along said road to the GO Transit Railway situated easterly of Blackthorn Avenue; thence northerly along said railway to Eglinton Avenue West; thence easterly along said avenue to the point of commencement.

== History ==
=== 2018 Boundary Adjustment ===
Toronto municipal ward boundaries were significantly modified in 2018 during the election campaign. Ultimately the new ward structure was used and later upheld by the Supreme Court of Canada in 2021.

The current ward is an amalgamation of the old Ward 17 (northern section), the old Ward 18 (southern section), and part of the western edge of the old Ward 19.

=== 2018 municipal election ===
Ward 9 was first contested during the 2018 municipal election. Ana Bailão, who was Ward 18 councillor and a deputy mayor, was elected with 83.62 per cent of the vote.

== Geography ==
Davenport is part of the Toronto and East York community council. On its north side, the ward borders Canadian National Railway tracks, Eglinton Avenue and Dufferin Street; on its south and west sides, it borders Canadian Pacific Railway tracks; and on its east side, Davenport borders Winona Drive, Ossington Avenue, Dundas Street and Davenport Road.

The ward includes parts of west-end Toronto, and includes the neighbourhoods of Fairbank, Oakwood-Vaughan, St. Clair Gardens, Corso Italia, Dovercourt Village, Bloordale Village, Bloorcourt Village, Brockton Village, the Junction Triangle and the western part of Rua Acores.

== Councillors ==
Council term	Member	
Council term	Davenport (Metro Council)	
1988–1991	Richard Gilbert	
1991–1994	Dennis Fotinos	
1994–1997	Dennis Fotinos	
	Ward 21 Davenport	
1997–2000	Betty Disero, Dennis Fotinos	
	Ward 17 Davenport	Ward 18 Davenport
2000–2003	Betty Disero	Mario Silva
2003–2006	Cesar Palacio	Adam Giambrone
2006–2010	Cesar Palacio	Adam Giambrone
2010–2014	Cesar Palacio	Ana Bailão
2014–2018	Cesar Palacio	Ana Bailão
	Ward 9 Davenport	
2018–2022	Ana Bailão	
2022–2026	Alejandra Bravo	
2026–2030	Alejandra Bravo	

== Election results ==
2026 Toronto municipal election

Candidate	Vote	%	minus
Alejandra Bravo (X)	28,179	66.46	4.26 ▼
Marco Martins	11,633	27.44	–
Ashley Jansen	1,396	3.29	–
Neil Simon	1,192	2.81	–

2022 Toronto municipal election, Ward 9 Davenport
Candidate	Votes	Vote share
Alejandra Bravo	17,009	70.72
Grant Gonzales	3,192	13.27
Shaker Jamal	1,414	5.88
Allie Spencer	882	3.67
Steven Leca	675	2.81
Simon Fogel	381	1.58
Jacob Maydansky	207	0.86
Mosea Houghron	151	0.63
Lazare Shorter	139	0.58
Total	24,050	100%
Source: City of Toronto

2018 Toronto municipal election, Ward 9 Davenport
Candidate	Votes	Vote share
Ana Bailão	26,219	83.62%
Nahum Mann	2,804	8.94%
Troy Young	1,218	3.88%
Mark Balack	1,114	3.55%
Total	31,355	100%
Source: City of Toronto

== See also ==
- Municipal elections in Canada
- Municipal government of Toronto
- List of Toronto municipal elections
