= 2014 Toronto municipal election =

2014 municipal election in Toronto, Ontario, Canada

- October 27, 2014
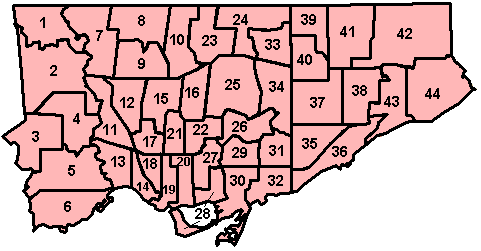
- The ward boundaries for the 2014 election. The Mayor and French school board trustees are elected across the city, councillors in their respective wards, and English public and Catholic trustees on a ward or dual-ward basis.
Council before election
(see table)
Elected Council
Toronto City Council 2014–2018

Municipal elections were held on October 27, 2014, to elect a mayor and 44 city councillors in Toronto, Ontario, Canada. In addition, school trustees were elected to the Toronto District School Board, Toronto Catholic District School Board, Conseil scolaire de district du Centre-Sud-Ouest and Conseil scolaire de district catholique Centre-Sud. The election was held in conjunction with those held in other municipalities in the province of Ontario. Candidate registration opened on January 2, 2014, and closed on September 12, 2014, at 2pm EST.

== City council ==
City councillors were elected to represent Toronto's 44 wards at Toronto City Council. 36 out of 37 incumbent councillors were re-elected to their previous seat.

=== Incumbents 2010-2014 ===
Ward	Councillor	Other roles
1 Etobicoke North	Vincent Crisanti	Chair of Etobicoke and York Community Council
2 Etobicoke North	Doug Ford	Vice-chair of Budget Committee
3 Etobicoke Centre	Peter Leon	
4 Etobicoke Centre	Gloria Lindsay Luby	Acting chair of Toronto Police Services Board (June–November, 2013)
5 Etobicoke-Lakeshore	James Maloney	
6 Etobicoke-Lakeshore	Mark Grimes	
7 York West	Giorgio Mammoliti	Chair of Community Development and Recreation
8 York West	Anthony Perruzza	
9 York Centre	Maria Augimeri	Chair of Toronto Transit Commission and North York Community Council
10 York Centre	James Pasternak	
11 York South-Weston	Frances Nunziata	Toronto City Council Speaker
12 York South-Weston	Frank Di Giorgio	Budget Chief
13 Parkdale-High Park	Sarah Doucette	Vice-chair of Toronto Board of Health
14 Parkdale-High Park	Gord Perks	Chair of Central Toronto and East York Community Council
15 Eglinton-Lawrence	Josh Colle	
16 Eglinton-Lawrence	Karen Stintz	Former chair, TTC
17 Davenport	Cesar Palacio	Chair of Licensing and Standards Committee
18 Davenport	Ana Bailão	
19 Trinity-Spadina	Mike Layton	
20 Trinity-Spadina	Ceta Ramkhalawansingh	
21 St. Paul's	Joe Mihevc	Vice-chair of Toronto Board of Health
22 St. Paul's	Josh Matlow	
23 Willowdale	John Filion	Chair of Toronto Board of Health
24 Willowdale	David Shiner	
25 Don Valley West	Jaye Robinson	
26 Don Valley West	John Parker	Deputy Speaker of Toronto City Council
27 Toronto Centre-Rosedale	Kristyn Wong-Tam	
28 Toronto Centre-Rosedale	Pam McConnell	
29 Toronto-Danforth	Mary Fragedakis	
30 Toronto-Danforth	Paula Fletcher	
31 Beaches-East York	Janet Davis	
32 Beaches-East York	Mary-Margaret McMahon	
33 Don Valley East	Shelley Carroll	
34 Don Valley East	Denzil Minnan-Wong	Chair of the Board of Public Works
35 Scarborough Southwest	Michelle Berardinetti	Chair of Scarborough Community Council
36 Scarborough Southwest	Gary Crawford	
37 Scarborough Centre	Michael Thompson	
38 Scarborough Centre	Glenn De Baeremaeker	
39 Scarborough Agincourt	Mike Del Grande	
40 Scarborough Agincourt	Norm Kelly	Deputy mayor, chair of Parks and Environment Committee.
41 Scarborough-Rouge River	Chin Lee	Vice-chair of Toronto Police Services Board, chair of Toronto Zoo.
42 Scarborough-Rouge River	Raymond Cho	
43 Scarborough East	Paul Ainslie	Chair of Toronto Library Board, vice-chair of Toronto Zoo
44 Scarborough East	Ron Moeser	

== School boards ==
School trustees were elected to the:

- Toronto District School Board
- Toronto Catholic District School Board
- Conseil scolaire Viamonde
- Conseil scolaire de district catholique Centre-Sud

== Issues ==
=== Transit ===
In the Greater Toronto Area, the average time spent commuting to and from work is 80 minutes, making it the worst among 19 large urban areas in North America. Transit was a major issue because of several controversial projects in the city, such as the use of subway versus light rail transit technology to replace the Scarborough RT, congested TTC streetcars, construction disruption from the Eglinton Crosstown, and the electrification of the Union Pearson Express. Proposals by Metrolinx to impose revenue tools to fund transit were also a source of controversy. The Toronto Region Board of Trade and TTC CEO Andy Byford stated that transit must be a critical issue that voters consider in the election.

=== Rob Ford ===
Much attention was given to allegations against Rob Ford during the 2014 election, and his admission on November 5, 2013, to smoking crack cocaine.

=== Ranked ballots and voting rights for permanent residents ===
On June 11, 2013, Toronto City Council passed a motion asking the Government of Ontario to give permanent residents the right to participate in municipal elections and to allow the city to adopt Ranked choice balloting (single-winner Instant-runoff voting), which would give voters the option to rank candidates in order of preference. Twenty-six councillors supported the motion and fifteen were against it. Following the council move, the Ranked Ballot Initiative of Toronto sent a petition with over eight thousand signatures to the provincial government, endorsing the council motion and requesting swift action on electoral reform. The Liberal MPP for Scarborough-Guildwood, Mitzie Hunter, then introduced the Toronto Ranked Ballots Election Act in March 2014. The bill was passed on the second reading but died prematurely when the Ontario election was called.

=== Other ===
In the wake of substance abuse allegations against Rob Ford, the possibility of reversing the 1998 amalgamation of Toronto was raised.

== Results ==
=== Ward 1 - Etobicoke North ===
Candidate Name	Number of votes	% of votes	Nomination Date	Biography and policies
Vincent Crisanti	7,427	46.31	27-Jan-14	Incumbent of Toronto City Council since 2010. Candidate in the 2003 and 2000 elections, beaten by incumbent Suzan Hall. Campaign issues included transport infrastructure and lowering taxes. Etobicoke resident for 31 years. Endorsed by Rob Ford.
Avtar Minhas	3,118	19.44	04-Feb-14	Small business owner and resident of Etobicoke North for over 14 years. Campaign issues included reducing traffic congestion, improving programs for youth and seniors, and access to affordable housing.
Jeff Corbett	1,699	10.59	12-Sep-14	
Patricia Crooks	942	5.87	24-Mar-14	Etobicoke North resident of 20 years, works at the Unity Village Family Services Centre. Campaign issues included a pledge to freeze seniors' Toronto Transit Commission (TTC) fares and increasing subsidised childcare options.
Idil Burale	878	5.47	02-Jan-14	Queen's Park political staffer and Toronto resident of more than 25 years. Involved with community organizations, including working with Somali youth through Positive Change Toronto. Campaign issues included support of the proposed Finch Light Rail Transit system. Endorsed by the Toronto Star, Torontoist, Now Magazine and the Toronto & York Region Labour Council.
Arsalan Baig	721	4.50	02-Jan-14	Real estate agent and mortgage broker, resident of 19 years. Campaign issues included upgrading the public transit system and introducing new programs for youth and seniors.
Khaliq Mahmood	304	1.90	09-Sep-14	
Gurinder Patri	269	1.68	08-Jan-14	Web writer. Campaign issues included supporting a property tax cap, educating business owners about competing in a global market, and incentivising research and development.
Akhtar Ayub	196	1.22	10-Jul-14	Engineer. Campaign issues included lobbying for waiving TTC fares for seniors and improving the reputation of the ward in order to counteract the falling numbers of new businesses and rising insurance prices.
Charan Hundal	173	1.08	14-Mar-14	Realtor, living in Ward 1 since 2010. Campaign issues included transit, jobs, infrastructure and skill development within the community.
Christopher Noor	172	1.07	19-Feb-14	
Dino Caltsoudas	140	0.87	28-Aug-14	
Total	16,039	100		

=== Ward 2 - Etobicoke North ===
Incumbent mayor Rob Ford, ran in Ward 2 after withdrawing from the mayoral election for health reasons. His nephew, Michael Ford, withdrew from the councillor election and was elected as TDSB trustee (and later elected as Ward 2 councillor in a by-election after Rob Ford's death).

Candidate Name	Number of votes	% of votes	Nomination Date	Biography and policies
Rob Ford	11,629	58.75	12-Sep-14	Son of former Progressive Conservative MPP Doug Ford Senior, brother of incumbent councillor and mayoral candidate Doug Ford Junior. Incumbent mayor of Toronto (2010–2014), former Toronto city councillor (2000–2010). Campaign issues extended from his mayoral policies and included reducing taxes and "building better communities". Rob Ford died on March 22, 2016, after an 18-month battle with cancer.
Luke LaRocque	2,158	10.90	14-Apr-14	Community activist, organizer, lifelong resident of Etobicoke. Campaign issues included investing in road maintenance and repair, increasing job opportunities with local businesses and creating safer, cleaner public parks.
Andray Domise	1,620	8.18	22-Apr-14	Financial planner, writer and manager. Campaign issues included transit, education and business growth. Endorsed by the Toronto Star, Torontoist, Now Magazine and Toronto & York Region Labour Council.
Munira Abukar	1,209	6.11	11-Jul-14	Born and raised in Etobicoke. Elected to the board of Toronto Community Housing Corporation in 2010. Campaign issues included increasing bus services, building bridges between local youth and police, and pushing Ottawa to invest in a national housing strategy.
David Caravaggio	768	3.88	02-Jan-14	Born and raised in Toronto. Industrial property manager. Campaign issues included fair taxes, job growth and an efficient public transit.
Ranjeet Chahal	460	2.32	10-Sep-14	
Gary Paterson	439	2.22	07-Mar-14	Etobicoke resident of 50 years. Electrician. Campaign issues included upgrading transport infrastructure, seniors' services, repairing and maintaining existing roads, and replacing streetcars with a subway system.
Ataul Malick	316	1.60	29-Aug-14	
Theo Lagakos	300	1.52	01-May-14	Campaign issues included upgrading school and community facilities, and developing both long-term and short-term plans for the development of public transit systems.
Doug Cronkite	269	1.36	11-Sep-14	Teacher. Campaign issues included increasing bus services in high-use areas, restoring late-night TTC services, attracting information technology companies to Toronto and building a convention centre at Woodbine to take advantage of its closeness to Pearson Airport.
Michelle Garcia	254	1.28	29-May-14	
Benn Adeoba	171	0.86	02-Jan-14	Immigrated to Toronto in 1998. Real estate broker. Campaign issues included affordable housing, upgrading transit infrastructure, increasing bus services, youth employment, and lowering taxes. At a candidate debate on October 15, 2014, stated that Etobicoke North residents want a fenced dog park and a constituency office.
George Singh	142	0.72	22-Jul-14	Etobicoke North resident of over 20 years. Campaign issues included privatisation of some TTC maintenance, proposing solar energy as a revenue stream for the city, and increasing investment and events in Ward 2.
Edmund Bueno-Bradley	58	0.29	22-Jul-14	Campaign issues included investing in a technologically integrated city hall, maintaining the current size of Toronto City Council, reducing the land transfer tax and decreasing commute times by upgrading transit infrastructure.
Total	19,793	100		

=== Ward 3 - Etobicoke Centre ===
Incumbent Peter Leon did not run (Leon was appointed to replace Doug Holyday in 2014).

Candidate Name	Number of votes	% of votes	Nomination Date	Biography and policies
Stephen Holyday	8,086	36.56	03-Sep-14	Son of former Ward 3 councillor (1994–2013), deputy mayor (2010–2013), former Etobicoke mayor (1994-amalgamation) and Progressive Conservative MPP (2013–2014) Doug Holyday. Campaign issues included reducing traffic congestion, investing in transit infrastructure, and managing development alongside a growing population. Endorsed by the Toronto Star.
Annette Hutcheon	5,135	23.22	02-Jan-14	Self-employed mortgage broker. Campaign issues included improving infrastructure to prevent basement flooding and ice storm damage, reducing property taxes, and reducing traffic congestion.
John Moskalyk	2,701	12.21	23-Apr-14	Businessman and mediator. Campaign issues included upgrading transit infrastructure and managing development through community consultation.
George Bauk	1,611	7.28	10-Sep-14	
Dean French	1,399	6.32	02-Jan-14	Etobicoke resident of 20 years. Campaign issues included managing development and investing in transit infrastructure.
Greg Comeau	1,100	4.97	14-Jan-14	Manager in software support and technical services. Campaign issues included reducing traffic congestion, upgrading transit infrastructure and managing development.
Peter Fenech	1,025	4.63	07-Feb-14	Technical support analyst at Pearson International Airport. Campaign issues included upgrading infrastructure to prevent flooding and blackouts, implementing an inner-city transit plan and promoting local businesses and community groups.
Roberto Alvarez	552	2.50	13-Jun-14	
Paola Bauer	313	1.42	11-Apr-14	
Frank D'Urzo	197	0.89	12-Sep-14	
Total	22,119	100		

=== Ward 4 - Etobicoke Centre ===
Incumbent Gloria Lindsay Luby did not run for re-election.

Candidate Name	Number of votes	% of votes	Nomination Date	Biography and policies
John Campbell	8,227	34.44	08-Jan-14	Former Toronto District School Board member (2003–2010) and chair (2008–2009). Vice chair of the budget committee for Toronto City Council. Etobicoke resident of 35 years. Campaign issues included managing development, support of subway systems, and creating an all-encompassing transit strategy. Endorsed by the Toronto Star.
Niels Christensen	6,847	28.67	28-Aug-14	President of Humber Valley Village Residents Association and retired police officer. Campaign issues included investing in water, sewer and road infrastructure, managing development, and restoring cancelled bus services before expanding transit infrastructure. Endorsed by Now Magazine.
Angelo Carnevale	4,968	20.80	09-Jan-14	Construction company owner and operator. Campaign issues included accountability at City Hall, maintaining roads and related infrastructure, upgrading transit infrastructure and enhancing green spaces.
Chris Stockwell	2,208	9.24	12-Sep-14	Son of former municipal politician Bill Stockwell. Former Progressive Conservative MPP (1990–1999), Speaker of the Legislative Assembly of Ontario (1996–1999), cabinet minister under both Mike Harris and Ernie Eves and former councillor (1999–2003). Campaign issues included reducing the land transfer tax, managing development through community consultation, and not reducing the number of front-line police officers.
Adam Slobodian	384	1.61	29-Aug-14	
Tony Chun	286	1.20	05-Mar-14	
William Murdoch	278	1.16	12-Sep-14	
Rosemarie Mulhall	267	1.12	30-Jan-14	
Mario Magno	216	0.90	10-Sep-14	Entrepreneur & owner of MAACO Collision Repair franchises in Etobicoke & North York
Oscar Vidal-Calvet	205	0.86	31-Mar-14	
Total	23,886	100		

=== Ward 5 - Etobicoke—Lakeshore ===
Incumbent James Maloney did not run for re-election. (Maloney was appointed to replace Peter Milczyn in 2014.)

Candidate Name	Number of votes	% of votes	Nomination Date	Biography and policies
Justin Di Ciano	15,362	54.20	21-Jul-14	Runner-up in 2010 election against Peter Milczyn. Former business owner and co-founder of the Jean Augustine Centre. Campaign issues included managing development through community consultation, increasing transit services, and pedestrian safety. Endorsed by the Toronto Star.
Kinga Surma	3,936	13.89	07-Jul-14	Former aide to former councillor Peter Milczyn. Campaign issues included managing development, lowering taxes, and improving public transit.
Guy Bowie	2,744	9.68	02-Jan-14	IT business owner. Campaign issues included reducing traffic congestion, managing development, and community safety.
Walter Melnyk	1,399	4.94	05-Sep-14	Campaign issues included supporting the property tax cap, introducing a Taxpayers Bill of Rights, and eliminating the land transfer tax.
Raymond Desilets	1,365	4.82	29-May-14	Employed in financial services. Campaign issues included upgrading public transit systems to include express streetcars, improving urban planning as development intensifies, and increasing investment in education and transit.
Tony D'Aversa	1,307	4.61	05-Sep-14	Owner and president of Big Paper America Inc., a packaging company. Campaign issues included improving public transit systems and pedestrian safety, lowering taxes, and improving stormwater management.
Nikola Samac	1,019	3.60	13-Jun-14	Owner and operator of a medical consulting company. Campaign issues included reducing traffic congestion, introducing tax incentives for small businesses, and reducing councillor salaries and expense accounts.
Magda Chelminska	645	2.28	12-Sep-14	
George Lehto	565	1.99	16-Jul-14	Elementary school teacher for 14 years, Toronto resident for 25 years.
Total	28,342	100		

=== Ward 6 - Etobicoke—Lakeshore ===
Candidate Name	Number of votes	% of votes	Nomination Date	Biography and policies
Mark Grimes	11,337	43.96	13-Aug-14	Incumbent of Toronto City Council since 2003, sat on the executive committees of mayors David Miller and Rob Ford. Campaign issues included reducing traffic congestion, implementing plans for a transit hub and improving transit services.
Russ Ford	8,791	34.08	17-Mar-14	Executive director of LAMP community health centre. Campaign issues included supporting community programs, reducing traffic congestion and working toward an integrated transit system for the city. Endorsed by the Toronto Star, Torontoist, Now Magazine and Toronto & York Region Labour Council.
Tony Vella	2,718	10.54	28-Aug-14	Police officer and former police spokesperson. Campaign issues included reducing traffic congestion, correcting poor urban planning, and aligning infrastructure upgrades with increasing development.
Miroslaw Jankielewicz	1,114	4.32	25-Aug-14	IT consultant. Campaign issues included reducing the size of Toronto City Council, introducing a term limit for councillors, reducing traffic congestion, and community safety.
Sean O'Calaghan	501	1.94	8-Apr-14	
Peggy Moulder	398	1.54	2-Jan-14	
Michael Laxer	305	1.18	3-Jan-14	Bookstore owner and social activist
Everett Sheppard	221	0.86	28-Aug-14	Retired professional wrestler and business person.
Ruthmary James	169	0.66	30-Jan-14	
Robert Sysak	90	0.35	12-Sep-14	
John Letonja	84	0.33	2-Jan-14	
Dave Searle	64	0.25	12-Sep-14	
Total	25,792	100		

=== Ward 7 - York West ===
Candidate Name	Number of votes	% of votes	Nomination Date	Biography and policies
Giorgio Mammoliti	6,816	46.08	01-May-14	Former NDP MPP (1990–1995) and North York City Councillor (1995–1998). Incumbent of Toronto City Council since amalgamation in 1998. Campaign issues included cutting the size of council, eliminating the land transfer tax and the proposal of a casino to increase tourism and create jobs.
Nick Di Nizio	5,274	35.65	07-Jan-14	Candidate in the 2010 election. Previous roles include project coordinator, relationship manager and account executive within the financial services technology industry. Campaign issues included improving transit, upgrading infrastructure, and unemployment. Endorsed by the Toronto Star.
John Chambers	827	5.59	02-Jan-14	Born and raised in Ward 7. Campaign issues included conditions of Toronto Community Housing, relieving traffic congestion, youth issues, and transparency in the expenditure of tax revenue. Endorsed by Senator Don Meredith.
Harp Brar	536	3.62	25-Jul-14	Campaign issues included supporting a property tax cap and seeking expert opinions in the case of urban planning, particularly for transport issues.
Chris Mac Donald	528	3.57	02-Jan-14	Real estate professional. Campaign issues included improving public transportation and the reputation of Ward 7.
Keegan Henry-Mathieu	471	3.18	17-Mar-14	Campaign issues included improving public transit, protecting programs and service for youth and seniors, and enforcing property standards. Endorsed by Torontoist, Now Magazine and Toronto & York Region Labour Council.
Larry Perlman	202	1.37	23-Jun-14	Resident of Ward 7 since 2003 and self-employed equities trader. Candidate in the 2006 election and the 2010 election. Campaign issues included diversifying Toronto's municipal revenue strategy, and improving public transport.
Scott Aitchison	139	0.94	02-Jan-14	Candidate in the 2010 election. Campaign issues included eliminating the land transfer tax, supporting a property tax cap, and job creation through existing businesses.
Total	14,793	100		

=== Ward 8 - York West ===
Candidate Name	Number of votes	% of votes	Nomination Date	Biography and policies
Anthony Perruzza	8,705	71.10	14-Jul-14	Former Metro Toronto Separate School Board Trustee (1985–1988), North York Councillor (1988–1990) and NDP MPP for Downsview (1990–1995). Incumbent of Toronto City Council since 2006. Campaign issues included youth unemployment, traffic congestion and support of the proposed Light Rail Transit system. Endorsed by the Toronto Star, Now Magazine and Toronto & York Region Labour Council.
Arthur Smitherman	1,326	10.83	04-Apr-14	Estranged brother of former OLP MPP George Smitherman. Candidate in the 2010 municipal election, and in the 2011 federal election as a Canadian Action Party candidate in York West. Supported Rob Ford's candidacy for mayor in 2010 despite his brother being Ford's opponent and supports Doug Ford for mayor in 2014. Campaign issues included lowering taxes and reducing excessive commute times by improving transit infrastructure.
Suzanne Narain	852	6.96	11-Sep-14	Born in Toronto, supply teacher and PhD candidate. Campaign issues included affordable housing, income inequity and improved quality of transit.
Princess Boucher	524	4.28	05-Jun-14	Owner and founder of the International Women Achievers Awards. Campaign issues included youth unemployment, community safety and support for small businesses.
Antonio Vescio	431	3.52	05-Sep-14	Born in Toronto, ran an advertising business for 22 years. Campaign issues included unemployment and transit, supporting the construction of a subway system.
Thomas Barclay	406	3.32	06-Jan-14	
Total	12,244	100		

=== Ward 9 - York Centre ===
Candidate Name	Number of votes	% of votes	Nomination Date	Biography and policies
Maria Augimeri	6,373	42.74	11-Feb-14	Incumbent of Toronto City Council since amalgamation. Former school trustee (elected 1982), North York City Councillor (1985–1988) and TTC Chair. Campaign issues included upgrading existing infrastructure, and the sale and development of Downsview Park. Endorsed by the Toronto Star, Now Magazine and Toronto & York Region Labour Council.
Gus Cusimano	4,230	28.37	29-Jan-14	Local business owner. Campaign issues included support for building subway systems, and increasing investment in infrastructure, roads, police and EMS.
Anthony Fernando	3,367	22.58	02-Jan-14	Founder of the Downsview Residents Association. Campaign issues included unemployment, affordable housing, community safety, and advocating for an evidence-based approach to transit systems and transit funding.
Danny Quattrociocchi	562	3.77	02-Jan-14	
Ances Hercules	248	1.66	06-Aug-14	
Wilson Basantes	130	0.87	21-Aug-14	
Total	14,910	100		

=== Ward 10 - York Centre ===
Candidate Name	Number of votes	% of votes	Nomination Date	Biography and policies
James Pasternak	11,183	57.78	15-Jan-14	Incumbent of Toronto City Council since 2010. Former school board trustee (2006–2010). Campaign issues included reducing traffic congestion, community safety, and driving capital investments within the community. Endorsed by the Toronto Star and Now Magazine.
Igor Toutchinski	3,112	16.08	25-Feb-14	Journalist and broadcaster. Campaign issues included more careful auditing, creating more express bus routes, and prioritising road repairs and maintenance.
David Epstein	2,126	10.99	02-Jan-14	Small business owner. Campaign issues included increased transparency in Council decision-making, and creating a comprehensive plan for public transit moving forward.
Michael Mitchell	1,096	5.66	08-Sep-14	Campaign issues included transit safety within Ward 10, and creating a collaborative long-term transport plan with the mayor and councillors.
Randy Bucao	1,040	5.37	03-Mar-14	IT professional. Campaign issues included improvement and development of public transit infrastructure, local job creation, affordable housing and increasing recreation programs and community spaces.
Liberato Masucci	796	4.11	12-Sep-14	
Total	19,353	100		

=== Ward 11 - York South—Weston ===
Candidate Name	Number of votes	% of votes	Nomination Date	Biography and policies
Frances Nunziata	13,201	71.33	14-Jan-14	Sister of former MP and candidate for Ward 12 John Nunziata. Former City of York School Board Trustee (1985–1988), City of York Councillor (1988–1994) and Mayor of City of York (1994–1997). Incumbent of Toronto City Council since amalgamation in 1998 and Council Speaker since 2010. Resident of Ward 11 for over 20 years. Campaign issues included reducing traffic congestion and championing further developments in the Toronto transit infrastructure.
Jose Garcia	3,212	17.36	12-Sep-14	Campaign issues included support of reducing the land transfer tax, lowering taxes for business, continuing to improve roads and transit systems, and attracting new investment and development.
Dory Chalhoub	2,093	11.31	21-May-14	Former banker and financial analyst. Campaign issues included lowering crime rates, cleaning up neighbourhoods, and providing incentives for businesses to open and create jobs. Endorsed by the Toronto Star.
Total	18,506	100		

=== Ward 12 - York South—Weston ===
Candidate Name	Number of votes	% of votes	Nomination Date	Biography and policies
Frank Di Giorgio	4,784	28.97	07-Jan-14	Incumbent of Toronto City Council since amalgamation. Former North York Councillor (1985–1997). Former secondary school teacher. Campaign issues included controlling growth and delivery of services, new investment to revitalise and job creation, and creating incentives for landlords to upgrade their buildings.
John Nunziata	4,546	27.53	12-Sep-14	Brother of Ward 11 incumbent Frances Nunziata. Former Member of Parliament (1984–2000). Lawyer. Campaign issues included expanding the Toronto Convention Centre to increase tourism, youth unemployment, and reducing taxes on business to encourage job creation.
Nick Dominelli	3,742	22.66	18-Feb-14	Candidate in the 2010 election, beaten by incumbent Frank Di Giorgio by 400 votes. Restaurant owner and former City of Toronto staffer. Campaign issues included affordable housing, bike paths for the community, and improving public transit systems. Endorsed by the Toronto Star.
Lekan Olawoye	3,441	20.84	02-Jan-14	Executive director of For Youth Initiative. Campaign issues included unemployment, affordable housing, and community safety. Endorsed by Now Magazine and Toronto & York Region Labour Council.
Total	16,513	100		

=== Ward 13 - Parkdale—High Park ===
Candidate Name	Number of votes	% of votes	Nomination Date	Biography and policies
Sarah Doucette	16,202	65.62	13-Jan-14	Incumbent of Toronto City Council since 2010. Campaign issues included upgrading city infrastructure to prevent flooding, blackouts and other issues, managing development, and contributing to a plan for affordable and effective transit plan for the city. Endorsed by the Toronto Star, Now Magazine and Toronto & York Region Labour Council.
Nick Pavlov	2,628	10.64	12-Sep-14	Real estate broker. Campaign issues included revitalisation of public spaces, being accessible as a councillor, and encouraging entrepreneurial ventures to flourish.
Eugene Melnyk	1,202	4.87	18-Jun-14	Campaign issues included community housing standards, lowering business taxes, and halving the land transfer tax.
Taras Kulish	1,145	4.64	05-Sep-14	Lawyer. Campaign issues included increasing bus services, upgrading the public transit system, and managing development so that the character of the community remained intact.
Thomas Dempsey	794	3.22	17-Mar-14	
Matthew Bielaski	704	2.85	05-Sep-14	
Alex Perez	679	2.75	26-Aug-14	
Evan Tummillo	532	2.15	23-May-14	
Rishi Sharma	457	1.85	03-Jul-14	
Greg Lada	183	0.74	24-Jul-14	
István Tar	110	0.45	02-May-14	
Bohdan Spas	55	0.22	11-Apr-14	
Total	24,691	100		

=== Ward 14 - Parkdale—High Park ===
Candidate Name	Number of votes	% of votes	Nomination Date	Biography and policies
Gord Perks	11,630	55.03	02-Jan-14	Incumbent of Toronto City Council since 2006. Campaign issues included public spaces and public services, improving the transit system, and environmental issues. Endorsed by the Toronto Star, Now Magazine and Toronto & York Region Labour Council.
Charmain Emerson	6,811	32.23	05-Aug-14	Businesswoman, former broadcaster and provincial cabinet advisor. Campaign issues included reducing traffic congestion, a unified transit system plan, and increasing transparency and accountability in Council decision-making.
Gus Koutoumanos	1,107	5.24	23-Jan-14	Mortgage agent. Campaign issues included support for senior citizens, maintaining social services in line with rapid development, and support for building a subway system.
Tim Kirby	968	4.58	11-Aug-14	
Andreas Marouchos	363	1.72	04-Sep-14	
Jimmy Talpa	254	1.20	05-Aug-14	
Total	21,133	100		

=== Ward 15 - Eglinton—Lawrence ===
Candidate Name	Number of votes	% of votes	Nomination Date	Biography and policies
Josh Colle	14,733	75.20	27-Mar-14	Son of MPP Michael Colle. Former Eglington-Lawrence School Board trustee (2000–2003) and chair of TTC since 2015. Incumbent of Toronto City Council since 2010. Born and raised in Toronto, has worked in financial services, the transportation industry, and served as vice president of an energy and infrastructure firm. Campaign issues included improving public transit and upgrading infrastructure. Endorsed by the Toronto Star, Now Magazine, former Toronto mayor Mel Lastman and deputy mayor Norm Kelly.
Chani Aryeh-Bain	2,410	12.30	11-Aug-14	School and work uniform business owner. Campaign issues included public transit, the land transfer tax, property taxes and unemployment.
Ahmed Belkadi	1,382	7.05	16-Jan-14	Born and raised in Toronto. Free the Children worker. Campaign issues included reducing traffic congestion, affordable housing and youth issues.
Eduardo Harari	645	3.29	14-May-14	Member of the Liberal Party of Canada. Information technology consultant and community activist. Campaign issues included unemployment, public transit and infrastructure upgrades.
James Van Zandwijk	422	2.15	28-Aug-14	Small business owner. Campaign issues included safer sidewalks, easier access to the city, and better housing support for low-income seniors.
Total	19,592	100		

=== Ward 16 - Eglinton—Lawrence ===
Incumbent Karen Stintz was running for Mayor but dropped out and declared she would not be running for council.

Candidate Name	Number of votes	% of votes	Nomination Date	Biography and policies
Christin Carmichael Greb	3,949	17.38	17-Jan-14	Daughter of MP John Carmichael. Campaign issues included community safety amidst rapid growth, investment in vital infrastructure and reducing traffic congestion. Endorsed by Conservative MPs Peter Kent and Lisa Raitt, and mayoral frontrunner John Tory. Also endorsed by departing city councillor and one-time mayoral candidate Karen Stintz
Adam Tanel	3,680	16.20	10-Feb-14	Municipal lawyer. Campaign issues included traffic congestion, community safety, parks and community services, and managing development.
Dyanoosh Youssefi	3,145	13.84	18-Mar-14	Social justice advocate and a part-time law professor at Seneca College, former criminal law practitioner. Campaign issues included a comprehensive transit plan incorporating all physical city infrastructure, managing development with community consultation, and affordable housing.
Jean-Pierre Boutros	2,428	10.69	26-Feb-14	Former assistant to Councillor Stintz, broke with her in support of light rail instead of a Scarborough subway. Campaign issues included increasing investment in city infrastructure, managing rapid growth and development, and improving parks and public spaces. Endorsed by the Toronto Star, Torontoist and Now Magazine.
Terry Mills	1,763	7.76	17-Jun-14	Community planner. Campaign issues included increasing bus services, support for the subway relief line, road repair and maintenance, and community consultation.
Steven Levitan	1,723	7.58	10-Sep-14	Lawyer and businessman. Campaign issues included managing growth, reducing traffic congestion, affordable housing and investing in public transit infrastructure. Endorsed by Councillor Gary Crawford, former senator Hon. Jerry Grafstein, and Minister of Defense Hon. Rob Nicholson.
Michael Coll	1,609	7.08	25-Feb-14	Industrial fire and security officer Campaign issues included reducing traffic congestion, affordable houses, and maintaining public parks and spaces. Coll's name has caused confusion among voters, as it differs only by a trailing "e" from that of the longtime Liberal MPP for Eglinton-Lawrence, Michael Colle.
Sean Conacher	1,309	5.76	27-Aug-14	Grandson of noted Canadian athlete and former politician Lionel Conacher. Campaign issues included infrastructure renewal, preserving public parks and green spaces, and improving public transit systems. Endorsed by former Canadian Prime Minister John Turner.
Elana Metter	1,245	5.48	12-Sep-14	Chair of Annex Shul. Campaign issues included open communication between Council and residents, community consultation, and upgrading transit infrastructure.
Gary Heaney	626	2.75	22-Aug-14	
Charm Darby	578	2.54	20-Jun-14	Ran for city council in 2006. Active member of St. Clements Church and Stanley Knowles Co-operative. Former board member of North Toronto Memorial Community Centre Advisory Board Council, Avenue Road & Eglinton Community Association, and Housing Connections Board Advisory Council.
Bob Williams	287	1.26	05-Sep-14	
John Cannella	121	0.53	03-Sep-14	
Thomas Gallezot	97	0.43	09-Jul-14	French citizen, who Immigrated from France in 2007. A former engineer and patent attorney. Ran for MPP as a NDP candidate in 2014 Provincial Election in Eglinton—Lawrence. In 2017 was the local delegate for the Emmanuel Macron campaign for President of France.
Paul Spence	93	0.41	26-Feb-14	
Peter Vukosavljev	70	0.31	27-May-14	
Total	22,723	100		

=== Ward 17 - Davenport ===
Candidate Name	Number of votes	% of votes	Nomination Date	Biography and policies
Cesar Palacio	8,293	46.24	27-Mar-14	Incumbent of Toronto City Council since his appointment to replace retiring councillor Dennis Fotinos in 2000. Immigrated to Toronto from Ecuador in 1972 and is Toronto's first Hispanic City Councillor. Campaign issues included safety and crime prevention, economic and social revitalisation of the ward, and the creation, maintenance and expansion of parks and green spaces.
Alejandra Bravo	7,840	43.71	21-Feb-14	Candidate in the 2003 and 2006 municipal elections, beaten by incumbent Cesar Palacio. Manager at Maytree Foundation. Campaign issues included increasing employment and community services, reducing crowding on busy transit routes and keeping transit fares stable. Endorsed by the Toronto Star, Torontoist, Now Magazine and Toronto & York Region Labour Council.
Saeed Selvam	1,404	7.83	02-Jan-14	Resident of Davenport for 15 years. Executive Director of non-profit organisation The Spark Initiative Inc., empowering women, youth and newcomers in vulnerable areas. Campaign issues included employment, community safety, business development, and sustainability and innovation.
George Stevens	398	2.22	02-Jan-14	Resident of Davenport for 15 years. Small business owner. Campaign issues included job creation, reducing traffic congestion, increasing public transit services and seeking alternative funding methods for upgrading transit infrastructure.
Total	17,935	100		

=== Ward 18 - Davenport ===
Candidate Name	Number of votes	% of votes	Nomination Date	Biography and policies
Ana Bailão	8,797	45.80	27-Jan-14	Incumbent of Toronto City Council since 2010. Campaign issues included affordable housing, improving transit systems, and sustainable community planning. Endorsed by the Toronto & York Region Labour Council
Alex Mazer	7,992	41.61	02-Jan-14	Former director of policy to the Ontario Minister for Finance. Campaign issues included affordable childcare, cycling infrastructure, fair taxes, and expanded public transit. Endorsed by the Toronto Star and Now Magazine.
Mohammed Uddin	540	2.81	02-Jan-14	
Jolene Hunt	358	1.86	28-Feb-14	
Paul Alves	274	1.43	08-Jul-14	
Elsa Romao	270	1.41	18-Feb-14	
Jim McMillan	213	1.11	30-Jun-14	
Derek Power	198	1.03	09-Jul-14	
Bobby Beckett	182	0.95	11-Sep-14	
Joseph Ferrari	176	0.92	03-Jan-14	
Robert Rodrigues	131	0.68	05-Sep-14	
Dennis Pavao	76	0.40	11-Sep-14	
Total	19,207	100		

=== Ward 19 - Trinity—Spadina ===
Candidate Name	Number of votes	% of votes	Nomination Date	Biography and policies
Mike Layton	21,014	83.66	08-Jul-14	Son of the late NDP Leader and former Toronto City Councillor Jack Layton. Stepson of mayoral candidate Olivia Chow. Incumbent of Toronto City Council since 2010. Resident of Trinity-Spadina for over 25 years. Campaign issues included transport infrastructure, affordable housing and preventing homelessness, maintaining and enhancing parks, protecting investments in arts and culture, and improving public safety. Endorsed by the Toronto Star, Now Magazine and Toronto & York Region Labour Council.
Scott Bowman	2,490	9.91	05-Aug-14	Entrepreneur and business owner. Campaign issues included balancing liveability with the increasing density and pace of development, and upgrading or adapting transit infrastructure.
Albina Burello	964	3.84	01-Apr-14	Background in the private sector, including financial services and training companies.
George Sawision	649	2.58	02-Jan-14	Candidate in the 2006 and 2010 elections. Born and raised in Trinity-Spadina. Master electrician. Campaign issues included transit and cycling infrastructure as well as managing development in the area.
Total	25,117	100		

=== Ward 20 - Trinity—Spadina ===
Incumbent Ceta Ramkhalawansingh did not run. She was appointed in 2014 to replace Adam Vaughan who resigned and was elected to the Canadian Parliament.

Candidate Name	Number of votes	% of votes	Nomination Date	Biography and policies
Joe Cressy	12,466	41.96	30-Jul-14	Son of former Toronto City councillor (1978–1982) Gordon Cressy. Former federal NDP candidate and activist. Campaign issues included income inequity, improving transit systems, and building social infrastructure. Endorsed by the Toronto Star, Torontoist, Now Magazine and Toronto & York Region Labour Council.
Terri Chu	3,693	12.43	02-Sep-14	Expert in community energy production and founder of civic engagement group Why Should I Care? Campaign issues included building transit infrastructure, installing cycling lanes, reducing traffic congestion, and sustainable community development.
Sarah Thomson	2,808	9.45	09-Sep-14	Former Liberal MPP candidate. Dropped out of mayoral race to run for Ward 20 councillor. Publisher. Campaign issues included reducing traffic congestion, improving public transit, and support for the arts.
Mike Yen	1,431	4.82	30-Apr-14	Entrepreneur and former federal officer. Campaign issues included improving transit systems, reducing traffic congestion, responsible community growth, and employment.
Philip Morrison	1,407	4.74	02-Jan-14	Owner of Jimmy's Coffee. Campaign issues included eliminating the land transfer tax, freezing property taxes, creation of an Accessible Mentorship program, and stiffer penalties for vandalism.
Anshul Kapoor	1,063	3.58	20-Aug-14	Digital marketer and communications expert. Founder of NoJetsTo, a grassroots organisation opposed to the expansion of the downtown airport. Campaign issues included affordable housing, mobility planning and a revitalised waterfront.
Charles MacDonald	972	3.27	09-Jun-14	
Albert Koehl	853	2.87	14-Jul-14	
Tonny Louie	740	2.49	24-Jul-14	
Daryl Christoff	705	2.37	06-May-14	
Mike Andreae	590	1.99	02-Jul-14	
Sam Goldstein	519	1.75	30-May-14	
Nick Wright	395	1.33	21-Jan-14	Former leader of the Green Party of Nova Scotia.
Stephanie Carty-Kegel	376	1.27	22-Aug-14	
Sam Novak	376	1.27	11-Sep-14	
Garaham Hollings	307	1.03	10-Jun-14	
Stella Kargiannakis	286	0.96	01-May-14	
Leanne Hicks	212	0.71	29-May-14	
Susan Tsai	194	0.65	30-Apr-14	
Michael Monaghan	128	0.43	10-Jan-14	
Kat Shermack	102	0.34	23-May-14	
Akeem Fasasi	86	0.29	08-Jul-14	
Total	29,709	100		

=== Ward 21 - St. Paul's ===
Candidate Name	Number of votes	% of votes	Nomination Date	Biography and policies
Joe Mihevc	15,745	76.95	2-Jan-14	Incumbent of Toronto City Council since amalgamation, represented Ward 28 (York-Humber) until that ward was abolished and Ward 21 (St. Paul's) was created in 2000. Chair of the Board of Health (2000–2003, 2013) and vice-chair of the Board of Health (2010–2012). Vice-chair of the Toronto Transit Commission (2003–2010). Campaign issues included income inequality, youth unemployment, increasing seniors' services and support of the proposed Light Rail Transit system. Endorsed by the Toronto Star, Now Magazine and Toronto & York Region Labour Council
Ted Bustamante	1,766	8.63	13-Aug-14	Campaign issues included support for cutting the size of council, phasing out the land transfer tax and relieving traffic congestion.
Cos Licursi	1,728	8.44	11-Aug-14	Campaign issues included supporting a cap on property taxes, phasing out the land transfer tax over ten years and relieving traffic congestion through building subways.
Rosina Bonavota	1,223	5.98	10-Sep-14	
Total	20,462	100		

=== Ward 22 - St. Paul's ===
Candidate Name	Number of votes	% of votes	Nomination Date	Biography and policies
Josh Matlow	24,347	86.16	10-Jan-14	Son of Federal Judge Ted Matlow. Incumbent of Toronto City Council since 2010 and former school board trustee (2003–2010). Campaign issues included improving public transit and reducing traffic congestion, supporting tenants to protest development and rent increases, and improving public spaces such as playgrounds and parks. Endorsed by the Toronto Star and Now Magazine.
Bob Murphy	1,586	5.61	11-Sep-14	
James O'Shaughnessy	1,526	5.40	09-Sep-14	
Sarfraz Khan	800	2.83	08-Sep-14	
Total	28,259	100		

=== Ward 23 - Willowdale ===
Candidate Name	Number of votes	% of votes	Nomination Date	Biography and policies
John Filion	14,128	55.49	16-Jan-14	Incumbent of Toronto City Council since amalgamation in 1998. Councillor for Ward 11 in North York prior to amalgamation (1991–1997). North York Board of Education 1982–1990, chairman 1987–1990. Journalist and book editor. Campaign issues included traffic congestion and support of the proposed Light Rail Transit system. Endorsed by the Toronto Star and Now Magazine.
David Mousavi	7,951	31.23	27-Jan-14	Born in Toronto. Lawyer and MBA. Campaign issues included traffic congestion, affordable housing and support for the proposed DRL subway system.
Kun-Won Park	2,049	8.05	14-Mar-14	Campaign issues included updating infrastructure and improving public transport. Emigrated from South Korea to Toronto in 1993, worked as a property manager and industrial project manager.
Chris Penny	593	2.33	09-Sep-14	
Scott Werle	380	1.49	10-Sep-14	
Carmen Kedzior	358	1.41	12-Sep-14	Campaign issues included transportation, job creation and youth mentoring.
Total	25,459	100		

=== Ward 24 - Willowdale ===
Candidate Name	Number of votes	% of votes	Nomination Date	Biography and policies
David Shiner	10,716	55.17	5-Sep-14	Son of former North York City Councillor (1973–1987) and Deputy Mayor Esther Shiner. Incumbent of Toronto City Council since amalgamation in 1998. Councillor of North York City Council (1991–1997). Campaign issues included expansion of the subway system and eliminating the land transfer tax.
Dan Fox	5,649	29.08	28-Feb-14	Community volunteer and public servant, has worked in both public and private sectors. Campaign issues included reducing traffic congestion, improving transit infrastructure, expanding parks. Endorsed by the Toronto Star, former Education Minister Gerard Kennedy, Now Magazine and Toronto & York Region Labour Council.
Randy Ai	1,299	6.69	13-Aug-14	Lawyer. Campaign issues included freezing property taxes for the next term of council, eliminating the land transfer tax and traffic congestion.
Michael Galea	1,098	5.65	23-Jul-14	Willowdale resident of 33 years. Architectural designer and community planner. Campaign issues included public transit, inclusive community planning and better fiscal management of capital projects in the city.
Daniela Acerra	661	3.40	12-Sep-14	
Total	19,423	100		

=== Ward 25 - Don Valley West ===
Candidate Name	Number of votes	% of votes	Nomination Date	Biography and policies
Jaye Robinson	19,066	83.24	25-Feb-14	Incumbent of Toronto City Council since 2010. Chair of Public Works and Infrastructure Committee. Endorsed John Tory for mayor. Campaign issues included support of a property tax cap, managing development through community consultation, and opposing the reduction or elimination of the land transfer tax. Endorsed by the Toronto Star and Now Magazine
Richard Friedman	1,891	8.26	11-Sep-14	Campaign issues included repairing and maintaining public roads, freezing wages for the TTC and police services, and offering tax incentives for citizens wishing to open businesses in Toronto.
Tanya Hostler	850	3.71	05-Sep-14	Candidate in the 2010 election. Campaign issues included capping property taxes and wage increases at the rate of inflation, and reforming the Toronto Employment and Social Services Division to create a "more results-based job placement system".
Kim Diep	564	2.46	29-Aug-14	
Nikola Streker	534	2.33	11-Sep-14	Campaign issues included eliminating the land transfer tax, setting realistic budgets and affordable housing.
Total	22,905	100		

=== Ward 26 - Don Valley West ===
Candidate Name	Number of votes	% of votes	Nomination Date	Biography and policies
Jon Burnside	9,415	42.73	09-May-14	Food-business owner and former policeman. Campaign issues included reducing traffic congestion and reforming the public transit system. Endorsed by mayoral frontrunner John Tory.
John Parker	6,167	27.99	09-May-14	Incumbent of Toronto City Council since 2006. Former Deputy Speaker (2010–2014) and Progressive Conservative MPP (1995–1999). Lawyer. Campaign issues included managing population growth and upgrading transit infrastructure.
Ishrath Velshi	3,055	13.86	02-Jul-14	Daughter of former Liberal MPP Murad Velshi and sister of veteran journalist and anchor Ali Velshi. Campaign issues included upgrading aging infrastructure, unemployment, community safety, and affordable housing. Endorsed by Toronto Star and Now Magazine.
David Sparrow	1,786	8.11	12-Mar-14	NDP candidate in the 2008 federal byelection, unsuccessful. Actor and president of the Alliance of Canadian Cinema, Television and Radio Artists (ACTRA). Campaign issues included inappropriate development, aviation noise levels, landlord-tenant relations, crime, accessible green spaces, and parking challenges. Endorsed by the Toronto & York Region Labour Council.
Wasim Vania	1,033	4.69	04-Sep-14	Real estate agent. Campaign issues included traffic congestion, youth unemployment and youth services.
Dimitre Popov	578	2.62	11-Sep-14	Campaign issues included reducing the number of City employees, employment, public transit, and noise pollution.
Total	22,034	100		

=== Ward 27 - Toronto Centre ===
Candidate Name	Number of votes	% of votes	Nomination Date	Biography and policies
Kristyn Wong-Tam	19,682	62.49	18-Feb-14	Incumbent of Toronto City Council since 2010. Former real estate professional. Campaign issues included responsible development, expansion of the city transit system and affordable housing. Endorsed by the Toronto Star, Now Magazine and Toronto & York Region Labour Council.
Megan McIver	5,340	16.96	14-Jul-14	Grew up in Lion's Head, Ontario, where her father has been the mayor for over 30 years. Self-employed consultant and former advisor to Ontario's Minister for Finance. Campaign issues included responsible development, reducing traffic congestion, affordable housing and investment in transit infrastructure.
Benjamin Dichter	1,528	4.85	23-Jan-14	Former diamond engraver and local business owner. Campaign issues included reducing traffic congestion, affordable housing, and improving tourism for the area.
Jordan Stone	1,270	4.03	15-Jan-14	Former fashion designer, rugby player, and film production company founder. Campaign issues included accountability, investing in cycling infrastructure, responsible development and community consultation.
David Byford	839	2.66	11-Sep-14	
Susan Humfryes	794	2.52	19-Aug-14	
Robin Lawrance	704	2.24	11-Jul-14	
Kamal Ahmed	609	1.93	11-Aug-14	
Alain D'Amours	378	1.20	28-Jul-14	
Rob Wolvin	351	1.11	09-Sep-14	Owned Gladaman's Den, pub in Ward 27 Partner with Developers to build infrastructure of community
Total	31,495	100		

=== Ward 28 - Toronto Centre ===
Candidate Name	Number of votes	% of votes	Nomination Date	Biography and policies
Pam McConnell	14,047	55.80	06-Jan-14	Incumbent of Toronto City Council since 1994, prior to amalgamation. Former school board trustee (1982–1994), chair of the Toronto Police Services Board (2004–2005) and vice-chair (2005–2010). Campaign issues included affordable housing, improving public and green spaces, and investing in cycling infrastructure. Endorsed by the Toronto Star, Now Magazine and Toronto & York Region Labour Council. Pam McConnell died on July 7, 2017, from a lung condition. She was 71.
David Blackmore	2,852	11.33	11-Sep-14	Executive Director of Cabbagetown BIA. Campaign issues included community safety, improving and maintaining green spaces, youth unemployment and improving transit systems with community consultation.
Jonathan Hughes	2,416	9.60	11-Aug-14	Business owner. Campaign issues included support for the LRT system, community safety and investing in cycling infrastructure.
Andy Melnyk	1,964	7.80	18-Jun-14	Campaign issues included community safety, reducing or eliminating the land transfer tax, and support for capping the property tax at the rate of inflation.
Daniel Patel	965	3.83	09-Sep-14	
Mohammed Sheikh	779	3.09	25-Apr-14	
Miguel Avila	456	1.81	08-Aug-14	
Adam Pham	447	1.78	30-Jun-14	
Christopher Brosky	349	1.39	06-Jun-14	
Sean Yilmaz	307	1.22	10-Mar-14	
Raj Rama	246	0.98	02-Jan-14	
Michael Loomans	169	0.67	29-Aug-14	
Gerald Derome	125	0.50	04-Sep-14	
Sammy Shaltout	51	0.20	15-Aug-14	
Total	25,173	100		

=== Ward 29 - Toronto—Danforth ===
Candidate Name	Number of votes	% of votes	Nomination Date	Biography and policies
Mary Fragedakis	11,904	59.34	06-Jan-14	Incumbent of Toronto City Council since 2010. Former small business owner. Campaign issues included reducing traffic congestion, improving cycling infrastructure, and building safe and sustainable neighbourhoods. Endorsed by the Toronto Star, Now Magazine and Toronto & York Region Labour Council.
Dave Andre	4,950	24.68	06-Feb-14	Civil engineer. Campaign issues included improving public transit, reducing traffic congestion, responsible development and affordable housing for all members of the community.
John Papadakis	2,000	9.97	31-Jan-14	Former East York Councillor (1991–1994). Campaign issues included reducing traffic congestion and improving public transit, reducing frivolous tax spending, and attempting to maintain the rising cost of hydro electricity.
Ricardo Francis	528	2.63	11-Sep-14	
Jimmy Vlachos	428	2.13	12-Sep-14	
Hank Martyn	249	1.24	29-Jul-14	
Total	20,059	100		

=== Ward 30 - Toronto—Danforth ===
Candidate Name	Number of votes	% of votes	Nomination Date	Biography and policies
Paula Fletcher	11,924	49.63	15-Jul-14	Incumbent of Toronto City Council since 2003. Former chair of the Toronto and East York Community Council (2012–2014), school board trustee (2000–2003) and leader of the Communist Party of Canada in Manitoba (1981–1986). Campaign issues included community safety, improving public transit systems to reduce commute times, affordable housing and improving civic engagement. Endorsed by Toronto Star, Torontoist, Now Magazine and Toronto & York Region Labour Council.
Liz West	6,644	27.65	10-Jan-14	Candidate in the 2010 election. Journalist and professional broadcaster. Campaign issues included long-term transit system planning, fair taxation, increasing bus services to reduce commute times, investing in safer cycling infrastructure.
Jane Farrow	4,815	20.04	20-May-14	Planning consultant. Former CBC Radio broadcaster, founding director and former executive director of Jane's Walk. Campaign issues included responsible development through community consultation, reducing traffic congestion, and developing and multi-strand transit plan including cycling infrastructure and pedestrian walkways.
Mark Borden	302	1.26	15-Jan-14	
Francis Russell	206	0.86	8-Aug-14	
Daniel Trayes	134	0.56	2-Jan-14	
Total	24,025	100		

=== Ward 31 - Beaches—East York ===
Candidate Name	Number of votes	% of votes	Nomination Date	Biography and policies
Janet Davis	12,697	61.80	06-Jan-14	Incumbent of Toronto City Council since 2003. Campaign issues included preserving and expanding childcare services, recreation, and library services, adoption of a long-term transit expansion plan, and support for tenants and affordable housing. Endorsed by the Toronto Star, Now Magazine and Toronto & York Region Labour Council.
George Papadakis	3,023	14.71	25-Jun-14	Engineer. Campaign issues included reducing traffic congestion, expanding public transit infrastructure, and safe and affordable housing.
Russell Rahman	1,652	8.04	02-Apr-14	Candidate in the 2010 election. Small business owner. Campaign issues included reducing poverty and homelessness in the community, reducing TTC fares, increasing transit service and maintenance, and community safety.
Brenda MacDonald	1,291	6.28	04-Sep-14	Candidate in the 2010 election. Campaign issues included providing job training and employment services, lowering Council expenses and reducing the budgets for Toronto Police and Emergency Services.
Janet Sherbanowski	858	4.18	03-Jul-14	
Mark Turnbull	462	2.25	14-Mar-14	
Bob Smith	256	1.25	10-Apr-14	
Michael Sokovnin	174	0.85	16-Jan-14	
Stephen Prince	133	0.65	09-Jan-14	
Total	20,546	100		

=== Ward 32 - Beaches—East York ===
Candidate Name	Number of votes	% of votes	Nomination Date	Biography and policies
Mary-Margaret McMahon	15,762	60.92	02-Jan-14	Daughter of former Collingwood mayor Ron Emo. Incumbent of Toronto City Council since 2010. Campaign issues included creating a long-term transit plan including cycling infrastructure, reducing transit fares and expansion and improvement of bus and streetcar services. Endorsed by the Toronto Star and Now Magazine.
Sandra Bussin	4,552	17.59	02-Sep-14	Former Toronto City Councillor for Ward 32 (1998–2010), Council Speaker (2006–2010), school trustee and Toronto Transit Commissioner. Previously worked as a senior political advisor to NDP MPP Morton Shulman. Campaign issues included responsible development through community consultation, reducing traffic congestion, and expanding public transit systems and services.
Brian Graff	1,922	7.43	21-Jul-14	Financial analyst/planning & urban development consultant. Campaign issues including improving transit infrastructure, responsible development, and increasing bus services.
James Sears	797	3.08	02-Jan-14	Pickup artist and former medical doctor, licence revoked. His initial platform was anti-Marxist and pro-Christian. His campaign included a website with an interactive animation that asked users to choose one of three playable characters, Rob Ford, Vladimir Putin or Adolf Hitler to "spank" the bare bottom of a cartoon caricature of incumbent Mary-Margaret McMahon. After the election, he went on to run in the 2015 federal election in the overlapping Beaches—East York riding as an independent but nominally as leader of the unregistered New Constitution Party of Canada, a white supremacist, anti-Semite and "anti-Marxist" neo-Nazi group based in Toronto.
Eric de Boer	677	2.62	23-Apr-14	
Carmel Suttor	464	1.79	25-Aug-14	
Alan Burke	404	1.56	26-Aug-14	
Maria Garcia	402	1.55	18-Jun-14	
Michael Connor	334	1.29	10-Jan-14	
Sean Dawson	241	0.93	20-Jun-14	
Bruce Baker	213	0.82	03-Sep-14	Candidate in 2010 election. Former TTC bus driver.
Jim Brookman	107	0.41	08-Aug-14	
Total	25,875	100		

=== Ward 33 - Don Valley East ===
Candidate Name	Number of votes	% of votes	Nomination Date	Biography and policies
Shelley Carroll	9,747	60.47	21-Feb-14	Incumbent of Toronto City Council since 2003. Chair of the Budget Committee and Deputy Speaker. Former school trustee (2000–2003). Campaign issues included responsible development, meaningful community engagement, and support for the Eglington Crosstown. Endorsed by the Toronto Star, Now Magazine and Toronto & York Region Labour Council.
Divya Nayak	3,534	21.92	07-Apr-14	Background in financial services. Campaign issues included reducing traffic congestion, developing and implementing a long-term transit plan, and investing in transit infrastructure to ensure a safe community.
Paul Bell	2,097	13.01	19-Feb-14	Stepson of former judge John A Goodearle. Former Progressive Conservative member. Campaign issues included upgrading and maintaining decaying infrastructure, and support of a more long-term transit plan.
Dina Karzman	525	3.26	12-Sep-14	
Khamphay Inthisorn	216	1.34	10-Mar-14	
Total	16,119	100		

=== Ward 34 - Don Valley East ===
Candidate Name	Number of votes	% of votes	Nomination Date	Biography and policies
Denzil Minnan-Wong	11,761	63.47	24-Apr-14	Son of Denzil Minnan-Wong Sr., former Progressive Conservative Party of Ontario MPP. Deputy Mayor, and incumbent of Toronto City Council since amalgamation in 1998. Appointed interim councillor of North York City Council in 1994 and elected to the role the following year. Worked as a lawyer, specialising in immigration issues. Campaign issues included transportation and recreational infrastructure. Endorsed by the Toronto Star
Mary Hynes	3,953	21.33	02-Jul-14	Former provincial and federal NDP candidate. Retired schoolteacher. Campaign issues included affordable housing, unemployment, and improving and maintaining infrastructure.
Douglas Owen	1,171	6.32	12-Sep-14	
Faisal Boodhwani	705	3.80	12-Sep-14	
Amer Karaman	486	2.62	17-Jan-14	
Alan Selby	453	2.44	09-Jan-14	
Total	18,529	100		

=== Ward 35 - Scarborough Southwest ===
Candidate Name	Number of votes	% of votes	Nomination Date	Biography and policies
Michelle Berardinetti	11,919	63.25	02-Jan-14	Incumbent of Toronto City Council since 2010. Campaign issues included renewal of transit, water and other infrastructure, reducing commute times and implementing student nutrition programs in schools. After the election, changed her name back to Michelle Holland. Endorsed by the Toronto Star.
Paul Bocking	2,722	14.44	02-Jan-14	Secondary school teacher and PhD candidate. Activist with Scarborough Transit Action and community newspaper columnist for Scarborough Bluffs Advocate. Campaign issues included income inequality, access to public services, local employment and public transit access, fares, and frequency. Endorsed by the Toronto & York Region Labour Council
Sharif Ahmed	927	4.92	20-May-14	
Christopher Upwood	890	4.72	10-Sep-14	
Shahid Uddin	831	4.41	12-May-14	
Teferi Assefa	487	2.58	24-Jan-14	
Anwarul Kabir	403	2.14	14-Aug-14	
Saima Shaikh	389	2.06	10-Feb-14	
Jason Woychesko	277	1.47	05-Feb-14	
Total	18,845	100		

=== Ward 36 - Scarborough Southwest ===
Candidate Name	Number of votes	% of votes	Nomination Date	Biography and policies
Gary Crawford	10,833	52.81	07-Jan-14	Incumbent of Toronto City Council since 2010. Former school board trustee (2000–2010). Campaign issues included keeping commercial and industrial taxes competitive, community safety, and improving streetscapes through revitalisation projects.
Robert Spencer	6,390	31.15	31-Mar-14	Background in public service. Campaign issues included expanding public transit and local bus services, investing in infrastructure to prevent flooding, job creation and employment, and improving services for youth, families, and seniors. Endorsed by the Toronto Star, Now Magazine and Toronto & York Region Labour Council.
Joy Robertson	994	4.85	11-Sep-14	
Masihullah Mohebzada	795	3.88	02-Jan-14	
Robert McDermott	638	3.11	02-Jan-14	
Ed Green	447	2.18	11-Jul-14	
Christian Tobin	320	1.56	26-Aug-14	
Andre Musters	98	0.48	12-Sep-14	
Total	20,515	100		

=== Ward 37 - Scarborough Centre ===
Candidate Name	Number of votes	% of votes	Nomination Date	Biography and policies
Michael Thompson	16,315	80.68	14-Jan-14	Incumbent of Toronto City Council since 2003. Chair of Economic Development and Culture Committee since 2010. Vice-chairman of the Toronto Police Services Board. Previously self-employed as a management consultant. Campaign issues included support for the proposed DRL subway development. Endorsed by the Toronto Star and Now Magazine
Niranjan Balachandran	2,440	12.07	10-Feb-14	IT professional. Campaign issues included traffic congestion, road maintenance, and support for the proposed DRL subway development.
Luigi Lisciandro	1,466	7.25	25-Apr-14	Campaign issues included improving accessibility within Toronto city.
Total	20,221	100		

=== Ward 38 - Scarborough Centre ===
Candidate Name	Number of votes	% of votes	Nomination Date	Biography and policies
Glenn De Baeremaeker	13,626	69.54	05-Aug-14	Incumbent of Toronto City Council since 2003. Deputy Mayor of Toronto East. Campaign issues included keeping taxes low, investing in building new infrastructure and maintaining old infrastructure, youth issues and maintaining public spaces like parks and libraries. Endorsed by the Toronto Star and Toronto & York Region Labour Council.
David Thomas	1,552	7.92	10-Feb-14	Campaign issues included reducing unemployment as a result of fixing the transit system, and support for eliminating the land transfer tax.
Ganga Sasthrigal	662	3.38	11-Sep-14	
John Lewis	642	3.28	10-Sep-14	
Kevin Winson	567	2.89	14-Aug-14	
Theodore Rueckert	550	2.81	06-Jan-14	
Theo Kalafatis	483	2.46	04-Jun-14	
Justin Reid	463	2.36	10-Sep-14	
Aysha Sidiq	460	2.35	05-Mar-14	
Rajesh Shah	405	2.07	05-May-14	
Tushar Shah	185	0.94	10-Sep-14	
Total	19,595	100		

=== Ward 39 - Scarborough—Agincourt ===
Incumbent Mike Del Grande did not run for re-election to Council, but ran for the Ward 7 Toronto Catholic School Board seat and replaced his son, John Del Grande, who did not run for re-election after holding the seat for 11 years.

Candidate Name	Number of votes	% of votes	Nomination Date	Biography and policies
Jim Karygiannis	9,438	57.98	02-Apr-14	Former member of Canadian Parliament for Scarborough—Agincourt (1988–2014). Campaign issues included community safety, ensuring that Scarborough Grace Hospital remained open and fully functional, and upgrading the public transit system.
Franco Ng	2,950	18.12	13-Jan-14	Previously worked for former Councillor Mike Del Grande's office. Campaign issues included community safety, accountability for the spending of tax dollars, improving city services, and reducing traffic congestion. Endorsed by the Toronto Star.
Cozette Giannini	1,600	9.83	10-Mar-14	Campaign issues included reducing traffic congestion, implementing modern transit infrastructure including a subway system, and developing an environmentally sustainable city. Endorsed by Now Magazine.
Derek Li	723	4.44	12-Sep-14	
Christopher Blueman	620	3.81	06-Jan-14	
Patricia Sinclair	597	3.67	07-Jan-14	
Clayton Jones	160	0.98	25-Mar-14	
Jude Coutinho	111	0.68	02-Sep-14	
Janet Rivers	78	0.48	11-Sep-14	
Total	16,277	100		

=== Ward 40 - Scarborough—Agincourt ===
Candidate Name	Number of votes	% of votes	Nomination Date	Biography and policies
Norm Kelly	16,052	85.97	28-Feb-14	Incumbent of city council since 1994. Former deputy mayor of Toronto (2013–2014) and MP for Scarborough Centre (1980–1984). Campaign issues included upgrading infrastructure and support for the proposed DRL subway development, as well as addressing the high volume of immigration and an aging population. Endorsed by the Toronto Star and Now Magazine.
Josh Borenstein	1,347	7.21	12-Sep-14	Campaign issues included eliminating the land transfer tax, a proposal to decrease property taxes by 65%, and the suggested creation of a new municipal currency – ‘Toronto dollars’.
Anthony Internicola	1,273	6.82	15-Jul-14	Campaign issues included eliminating the land transfer tax and offering added health and dental benefits to workers as opposed to pay increases.
Total	18,672	100		

=== Ward 41 - Scarborough—Rouge River ===
Candidate Name	Number of votes	% of votes	Nomination Date	Biography and policies
Chin Lee	10,019	52.46	31-Jan-14	Incumbent of Toronto City Council since 2006. Former IT consultant and manager in the private sector. Campaign issues included support for John Tory's policies and bid for mayor, and support of the SmartTrack transit plan. Endorsed by the Toronto Star and Now Magazine.
Cynthia Lai	4,387	22.97	10-Apr-14	Real estate professional. Campaign issues included transparency in spending tax dollars, affordable taxes, and expansion of the Sheppard Subway.
Sivavathani Prabaharan	2,069	10.83	04-Apr-14	Background working in government ministries, private companies and non-profit organisations. Campaign issues included youth unemployment, resisting higher taxes, and protect local businesses.
John Kladitis	1,747	9.15	09-Sep-14	Supporter of Rob and Doug Ford. Campaign issues included supporting the subway expansion and keeping taxes low, as well as supporting the policies of the Ford brothers.
Sandeep Srivastava	875	4.58	05-May-14	Director of Information Technology and Community College Professor.
Total	19,097	100		

=== Ward 42 - Scarborough—Rouge River ===
Candidate Name	Number of votes	% of votes	Nomination Date	Biography and policies
Raymond Cho	11,768	49.46	13-Jun-14	Incumbent of Toronto City Council since 1991. Campaign issues included reducing traffic congestion, implementing effective transit infrastructure, and support for the expansion of a subway into Scarborough. Raymond Cho resigned as councillor when he was elected Progressive Conservative MPP for Scarborough-Rouge River on September 1, 2016. His seat was filled by Neethan Shan.
Neethan Shan	7,393	31.07	19-Jun-14	Former NDP candidate. Executive Director of Council of Agencies Serving South Asians and former school board trustee (2006–2010). Candidate in the 2010 election. Campaign issues included Endorsed by the Toronto Star, Now Magazine and Toronto & York Region Labour Council.
Ken Jeffers	1,074	4.51	24-Jun-14	Campaign issues included reallocating budget and resources to where they are most needed, attracting foreign investment for local businesses, and increasing the frequency of bus services.
Gulam Mohamed	1,048	4.40	08-Apr-14	Campaign issues included re-evaluating the city budget, encouraging investment by building new infrastructure, and support for the subway expansion into Scarborough.
Neethan Sabaratnam	911	3.83	16-Jan-14	
Sherri-Anne Williams	521	2.19	02-Sep-14	
Dwayne Chin	363	1.53	02-Jan-14	
Kabirul Mollah	279	1.17	07-May-14	
Somu Mondal	233	0.98	28-Feb-14	
Ganesh Kulasegarampillai	107	0.45	28-Mar-14	
Venthan Ramana	96	0.40	02-Jan-14	
Total	23,793	100		

=== Ward 43 - Scarborough East ===
Candidate Name	Number of votes	% of votes	Nomination Date	Biography and policies
Paul Ainslie	12,358	74.32	2-Jan-14	Incumbent of Toronto City Council since 2006. Former chair of the Scarborough Community Council (2010–2012). Campaign issues included engaging constituents in decision-making, improving regional transportation links, reducing traffic congestion, and lobbying federal and provincial governments to implement tax changes. Endorsed by the Toronto Star and Now Magazine.
Mark Harris	1,750	10.53	3-Jul-14	Journeyman carpenter. Campaign issues included demolishing the Guild Inn and building a trade school on the property, job creation, and education.
Jason Colterman	1,437	8.64	17-Jan-14	First-aid instructor. Campaign issues included resisting the removal of two firetrucks from the ward which would increase response times, building a community centre for children and families, and building the Scarborough subway.
Alonzo Bartley	799	4.81	2-Jan-14	
Andi Kodanipork	283	1.70	12-Sep-14	
Total	16,627	100		

=== Ward 44 - Scarborough East ===
Candidate Name	Number of votes	% of votes	Nomination Date	Biography and policies
Ron Moeser	6,416	25.73	12-Sep-14	Incumbent of Toronto City Council since amalgamation in 1998. Former chair of the Scarborough Community Council (2002–2003) and Scarborough City Councillor (1988–1998). Campaign issues included finding savings through staff reduction, improving the transit system and working with federal and provincial government as well as private industry to create more jobs in the community. The office of the mayor confirmed that Ron Moeser died on April 17, 2017, due to complications related to his battle with lymphoma cancer.
Jennifer McKelvie	5,844	23.44	18-Mar-14	Environmental scientist. Campaign issues included creating a transit plan that reduced congestion, minimised travel time and improved air quality, as well as responsible development.
Diana Hall	5,530	22.18	12-Sep-14	Candidate in the 2010 election, beaten by incumbent Ron Moeser. Campaign issues included responsible and sustainable development, reducing traffic congestion, implementing short-term transit strategies and realising long-term transit goals. Endorsed by the Toronto Star.
Amarjeet Chhabra	2,852	11.44	01-May-14	Candidate for the NDP nomination in 2013, beaten by Adam Giambrone. Former labour organiser. Campaign issues included reducing traffic congestion and commute times, responsible development and creating greener, more efficient buildings. Endorsed by Now Magazine and Toronto & York Region Labour Council.
Richard Ross	1,859	7.46	10-Mar-14	Service company owner and operator. Campaign issues included responsible development and a transit solution that is fiscally responsible, functional and able to be completed in a timely manner.
Mohammed Mirza	445	1.78	10-Jun-14	
Paul Maguire	362	1.45	04-Feb-14	
Ragu Thanabalasingam	353	1.42	03-Sep-14	
Ashley Sondhi	337	1.35	11-Aug-14	
Arlene Nielsen	237	0.95	04-Jun-14	
Neethra Vipulanandan	202	0.81	25-Apr-14	
Phil Allen	185	0.74	05-Sep-14	
Marc Proctor	147	0.59	10-Sep-14	
Graham Beckmann	128	0.51	02-Sep-14	
MarkPaul St.Bishoy	37	0.15	12-Sep-14	
Total	24,934	100		
