= Alejandra Bravo (politician) =

Canadian politician

Toronto City Councillor for Ward 9 Davenport
- Incumbent
- Assumed office November 15, 2022
- Preceded by: Ana Bailão

Chair of the Toronto Economic and Community Development Committee
- Incumbent
- Assumed office August 10, 2023
- Mayor: Olivia Chow
- Preceded by: Shelley Carroll

Personal details
- Born: 1971 (age 54–55) Chile
- Party: Independent
- Other political affiliations: New Democratic (federal)
- Education: University of Toronto
- Occupation: Politician; community organizer; Adult educator
- Website: www.alejandrabravo.ca www.bravodavenport.ca

Alejandra Bravo (born 1971) is a Canadian politician who has represented Ward 9 Davenport on Toronto City Council since 2022. Bravo has been the chair of city council's Economic and Community Development Committee since 2023.

Bravo was first elected in the 2022 municipal election and was re-elected in 2026.

== Early life and education ==
Bravo was born in Chile in 1971. She lived in Santiago until 1973, when the 1973 Chilean coup d'état forced her family to Canada.

Bravo earned a Bachelor of Arts in Latin American studies from the University of Toronto, before attending the Ontario Institute for Studies in Education to earn a Master of Arts in Adult Education and Community Development.

== Career ==
Prior to her election to council, Bravo worked as manager of leadership and learning for the Maytree Foundation, and as director of leadership and training at the Broadbent Institute.

== Political career ==
=== Early campaigns ===
Bravo ran in the former Ward 17 Davenport in the 2003 Toronto municipal election, the 2006 Toronto municipal election and the 2014 Toronto municipal election, finishing in second place all three times behind Cesar Palacio. She did not run in the 2010 Toronto municipal election, instead endorsing Jonah Schein as a challenger to Palacio.

Bravo ran as a New Democratic Party candidate in Davenport in the 2021 Canadian federal election, losing to Julie Dzerowicz by a 76-vote margin so narrow that it was verified in a judicial recount.

=== 2022 Toronto election ===
Ward 9 Councillor Ana Bailão announced that she would not be seeking re-election after serving on council for 12 years, leaving the seat in Davenport open for the 2022 election. Bravo joined the race on July 5, 2022, and ran on a platform which included ending exclusionary zoning, building affordable housing, providing stronger tenant protections, improving transit and building more cycling infrastructure. She received endorsements from the Toronto Star, the city's largest newspaper and Progress Toronto, a left-wing advocacy group.

Following the election on October 24, Bravo won the ward with over 70 percent of the vote. She took office on November 15, 2022.

=== 2026 Toronto election ===
Bravo ran for re-election in the 2026 municipal election. Her primary challenger was real estate agent Marco Martins, who was endorsed by conservative groups ABC Toronto and OneGlobalVoice. She was re-elected with 66.5 percent of the vote share.

=== Toronto City Councillor ===
In November 2022, Bravo was appointed to sit on several committees including General Government Committee, Budget Committee, Board of Health, and the Toronto Preservation Board. She was elected as Vice Chair of the Board of Health.

Following the 2023 mayoral by-election, newly elected Mayor Olivia Chow appointed Bravo as the chair of the Economic and Community Development Committee, one of the four standing committees of Toronto City Council. Bravo was also appointed as vice-chair of Striking Committee, chair of the Toronto Francophone Affairs Advisory Committee, as a member of Executive Committee, the Toronto Arts Council, and remained the vice-chair of the Board of Health.

== Electoral history ==
=== Federal elections ===
2021 Canadian federal election: Davenport
Party	Candidate	Votes	%	±%	Expenditures
Liberal	Julie Dzerowicz	19,930	42.13	-1.59	$101,254.58
New Democratic	Alejandra Bravo	19,854	41.97	+0.95	$102,816.01
Conservative	Jenny Kalimbet	4,774	10.09	+0.84	$6,403.32
People's	Tara Dos Remedios	1,499	3.17	+2.24	$3,001.04
Green	Adrian Currie	1,087	2.30	-2.21	$14,660.32
Independent	Troy Young	86	0.18		none listed
Independent	Chai Kalevar	77	0.16	+0.01	none listed
Total valid votes/expense limit		47,307	99.10	–	$109,525.37
Total rejected ballots		429	0.90	+0.12	
Turnout		47,736	61.07	-4.26	
Eligible voters		78,167			
Source: Elections Canada

=== Municipal elections ===
2026 Toronto municipal election, Ward 9 Davenport
Candidate	Votes	Vote share
Alejandra Bravo	28,179	66.46
Marco Martins	11,633	27.44
Ashley Jansen	1,396	3.29
Neil Simon	1192	2.81
Total	42,400	100%
Source: City of Toronto

2022 Toronto municipal election, Ward 9 Davenport
Candidate	Votes	Vote share
Alejandra Bravo	17,009	70.72
Grant Gonzales	3,192	13.27
Shaker Jamal	1,414	5.88
Allie Spencer	882	3.67
Steven Leca	675	2.81
Simon Fogel	381	1.58
Jacob Maydansky	207	0.86
Mosea Houghron	151	0.63
Lazare Shorter	139	0.58
Total	24,050	100%
Source: City of Toronto

2014 Toronto municipal election, Ward 17 Davenport
Candidate Name	Number of votes	% of votes
Cesar Palacio	8,293	46.24
Alejandra Bravo	7,840	43.71
Saeed Selvam	1,404	7.83
George Stevens	398	2.22
Total	17,935	100

2006 Toronto municipal election, Ward 17 Davenport
Candidate	Votes	%
Cesar Palacio (incumbent)	4827	42.3
Alejandra Bravo	4546	39.8
Fred Dominelli	1491	13.1
Cinzia Scalabrini	211	1.9
David Faria	206	1.8
Gustavo Valdez	77	0.7
Wilson Basantes Espinoza	50	0.4

2003 Toronto municipal election, Ward 17 Davenport
Candidate	Votes	%
Cesar Palacio	5,127	44.99
Alejandra Bravo	4,336	38.05
David Senater	940	8.24
Romolo Cimaroli	530	4.65
Nicolo Fortunato	461	4.04
