= Green box =

Green box may refer to:

- Green box (container), a large metal container, designed and utilised for free public disposal and recycling of electronic waste.
- Green box (phreaking), a device used to manipulate the coin collection mechanism of payphones
- Green box (WTO agreement), a class of subsidies regulated by the international Agreement on Agriculture
- The Green Box, Marcel Duchamp's published notes on his work The Bride Stripped Bare By Her Bachelors, Even
- A Flash flood watch
- GreenBox – Series of Austrian technology demonstration satellites

== See also ==
- Green bin, a large, movable, rigid plastic or metal container used to collect biodegradable waste or compostable materials
