= Betty Disero =

Canadian politician

Betty Disero is a Canadian politician, the former Lord Mayor of Niagara-on-the-Lake, Ontario. She is a former city councillor in Toronto, Ontario, Canada. She was elected to the Toronto City Council in 1985, and served until her resignation in 2003. She moved to Niagara-on-the-Lake in 2009 and was first elected to town council in 2014, becoming Lord Mayor in 2018.

== Early life and career ==
Disero's parents were Italian immigrants who moved to Toronto from the town of Pescara. She took courses at York University, and graduated in computer studies from Humber College in 1979.

Disero is a member of the Liberal Party, and worked as a campaign manager for Member of Provincial Parliament Tony Ruprecht prior to running for office herself. She was elected in 1982 as a trustee on the Toronto Catholic District School Board.

== City councillor ==
=== First two terms ===
In 1985, Disero defeated veteran politician Joseph Piccininni to win election to the Toronto City Council. Her campaign was assisted by members of the provincial and federal Liberal parties, including Tony Ruprecht and Member of Parliament Charles Caccia. She was generally associated with the council's right-wing.

Disero was appointed to several important city commissions following her election. She was appointed to the Board of Directors of St. Michael's Hospital in January 1986 as a city representative, and was appointed to the city's three-member budget review group later in the same year. Disero was subsequently appointed to the Toronto Harbour Commission in 1987. She sought the chairmanship of the city-services commission in late 1987, but was defeated.

In March 1988, Disero brought forward a controversial six-month freeze on new rooming houses for the city. Disero argued that she was not opposed to rooming houses as such, but was trying to combat abuses in the system. She also argued that she was trying to prevent neighbourhoods from being turned into ghettos. Critics argued that the freeze was an unwarranted overreaction, and made it even more difficult for the city's homeless to find affordable housing. Toronto Mayor Art Eggleton described it as "a completely unjustified panic move". Following criticism from the provincial government, council partially overturned the freeze in May 1988. Disero later supported separate efforts to address abuses within the system.

Disero was re-elected without opposition in 1988. In 1990, she opposed plans by the Supportive Housing Group to build affordable housing on McCormack Street. She argued that the proposed project was "too large and incompatible with the neighborhood".

She initially voted for a declaration of Toronto Gay Pride Day in 1989, but later indicated that she did so only on procedural grounds, to reopen debate at a subsequent meeting. She voted against the declaration when the issue was reconsidered. In later years, she took steps to improve her relationship with Toronto's gay community.

=== Harbour Commissioner ===
Disero was named chair of the Toronto Harbour Commission in January 1989. She opposed Mayor Eggleton's plan to sell THC-owned land to Dover Elevator Corp. Canada Ltd. below market value, arguing that the planned sale appeared to contravene the Ontario Municipal Act. Others criticized her position. The deal was abandoned in April 1989. Disero was also critical of a plan submitted by David Crombie in late 1989 for THC reform.

Disero supported expansions to the Toronto's Island Airport, including increased flights and a new passenger terminal. These plans were opposed by a local group called the Metropolitan Toronto Waterfront Coalition, and by rival councillor Jack Layton who called for Disero's impeachment. The city initiated several legal challenges before expansion was permitted in June 1990. In January 1991, the city signed a contract for expansion with Castlepoint Development Corp.

Disero resigned as THC head on July 10, 1990, but remained a member of the commission. She initially opposed plans for Toronto to purchase lands owned by the Harbourfront foundation, but changed her mind on the issue in 1991. In 1994, she supported THC reforms brought forward by Mayor June Rowlands, including hiring an independent financial auditor and changing its name to the Toronto Port Authority.

In 1991, she brought forward a motion to have Toronto Island residents pay new rents, back rents and utility fees previously covered by the city. Critics argued that these measures would result in the death of the community. Former Member of Provincial Parliament Richard Johnston strongly criticized this suggestion in a report on the Islands released later in the year.

Disero endorsed a fixed link between Toronto and the Islands in late 1992. In 1995, she opposed a plan to build new houses on Islands property.

=== 1991 mayoral campaign ===
Disero ran for the position of Mayor of Toronto in the 1991 municipal election but dropped out to back June Rowlands after her campaign failed to gain momentum. While in the race, she described herself as a middle-of-the-road candidate who could avoid left-wing and right-wing extremes. She also unveiled a "vision of Toronto's port industrial area" that included "an industrial development proposal on more than 214 hectares of public land". She also supported leasing unused lands to developers. She supported Sunday shopping, and criticized a report which called for fewer cars in Toronto to reduce pollution.

After leaving the mayoral race, Disero campaigned for re-election for council in Toronto's twelfth ward. This created tensions with Fred Dominelli, a supporter who had already declared himself a candidate to succeed her. Dominelli claimed that Disero "stabbed him in the back" with her late decision to seek re-election. Disero won re-election without difficulty.

=== Early 1990s ===
Disero was appointed to chair Toronto's economic development committee after the 1991 election. She became involved with the arts community, and played an active role in promoting Toronto's film industry. She also opposed plans by the federal government of Brian Mulroney to privatize two terminals at Toronto Pearson International Airport. During this period, she pulled away from the right wing of council and became known as a pragmatic centrist.

Disero almost lost her council seat in 1992 following a private legal challenge from academic David Rayside, who argued that she had overspent in her 1991 campaign. The controversy centred on whether or not expenses from Disero's abortive mayoral campaign should have counted toward her spending limit for council: Rayside argued that her publicity expenses in the mayoral race gave her an unfair advantage over other Ward 12 candidates. Presiding justice Alvin Rosenberg initially ruled against Disero, and declared her council seat vacant on April 7, 1992. The justice wrote in his decision, "Although no bad faith is implied on the part of Disero, the result of her change of offices cannot allow her to spend more money than other candidates are entitled to spend and thus give her an unfair advantage". Disero was granted a stay on April 15, which allowed her to retain her seat during the appeals process. On June 19, an Ontario Division Court Tribunal overturned Rotenberg's decision and allowed Disero to keep her seat.

In December 1991, Disero unsuccessfully tried to overturn a bylaw which permitted the construction of publicly financed alternative housing with fewer parking spaces than were required for market condominiums. In the same month, she brought forward a motion to approve a land-development trade involving harbourfront and railway lands. Although the motion passed easily, critics argued that they were not given access to the full details.

Disero was a frequent rival to budget chief Tom Jakobek in this period, and joined with Barbara Hall and other members of the council's left-wing to remove him from his position in 1992. In seeking his dismissal, Hall argued that Jakobek had exercised undue influence to push a questionable $100,000 orchestra grant through council. Jakobek responded by suggesting that Disero responsible for the grant, a charge she denied. An official report in 1993 exonerated Jakobek from accusations of illegal activity, but did not provide full resolution to the controversy.

Disero advocated significant budget cuts for Toronto in 1993, to counteract the effects of a serious economic downturn across the country. She said that the city needed to impose significant wage cuts, or introduce unpaid leave days, in order to remain solvent.

In the early 1990s, right-wing journalist Judi McLeod lodged a formal complaint with the police accusing Disero of being linked to the Mafia, and of holding a conflict of interest in her role as vice-chairman of the Toronto Harbour Commission due to a personal relationship. The police investigated and found no evidence of any wrongdoing. In 1994, Toronto Life magazine reported that McLeod was harassing Disero at her private residence.

In 1994, Disero co-sponsored a resolution which would have allowed police to disperse crowds of more than three people who were seen as ""accosting, frightening, intimidating, obstructing or threatening" to others on the street. Disero argued that the measure would reduce illegal activity, while others argued it would lead to abuse. Council rejected the motion.

She considered running for Oakwood in the 1995 provincial election, but later stood aside to allow Mike Colle to win the Liberal nomination.

=== After amalgamation ===
In 1997, she was part of a small minority of Toronto councillors to vote against a plebiscite on plans by the provincial government of Mike Harris to amalgamate the City of Toronto with neighbouring municipalities. Disero argued that the plebiscite could damage the city's position if the turnout was low, or if it showed little opposition to the Harris government's plan. She also argued that it was too expensive.

The City of Toronto was amalgamated in 1997, and Disero campaigned for a seat on the new city council in the two-member Davenport ward. She was elected to the first position, and was appointed chair of the Works and Utilities Committee in January 1998. One of her priorities was attempting to resolve the city's waste disposal problem. She recommended that the city consider incineration as an option.

Disero was an early supporter of market value property tax reform, which was opposed by most other Toronto councillors during the 1980s. Following some initial reluctance, she voted in favour of Mel Lastman's five-year phase-in plan in 1998.

Disero was re-elected without difficulty in the 2000 municipal election, after receiving endorsements from Mayor Mel Lastman and the Toronto Police Association. She was appointed chair of the Works Committee in December 2000. She was also appointed to the newly formed Waterfront Reference Group on June 26, 2001. In 2002, she supported reducing the number of city councillors from 44 to 22.

=== Waste disposal policy ===
She was also appointed co-chair of Task Force 2010, which examined options to divert the city's waste to recycling and composting programs. She argued that the cost of waste management could more than double in ten years, and called for greater investment from the federal and provincial governments. The task force held a series of public meetings, and in June 2001 submitted a report to divert all residential garbage to recycling and composting by 2010. Disero supported expansions to the blue box recycling program in her capacity, and announced the launch of a green box program in September 2001.

In early 2002, Disero indicated that the city was considering a plan to turn the city's garbage into steam energy. Critics, including Jack Layton, argued that that city seemed to be embarking on a major project without due consultation. Layton also question the scientific merits of the proposal, arguing that the combustion process may not be environmentally sound.

=== Transit Commission Chair ===
Disero was selected as chair of the Toronto Transit Commission on June 24, 2002, defeating sitting chair Brian Ashton by a 6-3 vote. She immediately announced plans to make the TTC more financially accountable. Some described her appointment as a shift to the right for the body. Soon after her appointment, she recommended that cheery messages such as "Welcome aboard" and "Have a nice day" be piped through TTC speakers to improve morale among passengers. Some argued that this was a diversion from the TTC's funding problems.

Disero supported a streetcar right-of-way for St. Clair Avenue, and the creation of new bus-only lanes within the city. She also supported increased transit services throughout the Greater Toronto Area. In October 2002, she supported an increase in bulk ticket and token prices by 10 cents and Metropasses by $5.25 a month. Disero argued that the hikes were necessary to combat the TTC's financial difficulties. She rejected plans for a more significant increase. She criticized a 2003 grant from the provincial government of Ernie Eves as insufficient for the TTC's needs.

== After Toronto politics ==
Disero unexpectedly resigned from council on March 14, 2003. She subsequently created the firm Boomer Consulting, named after her dog. She also returned to City Hall in 2003 as business development officer for Light Heat Cool Ltd., a new-technology waste-disposal firm. Her longtime assistant Cesar Palacio won the Ward 17 council seat in the 2003 municipal election.

Disero has continued to support gasification techniques for disposing urban waste.

== Niagara-on-the-Lake ==
Disero moved to Niagara-on-the-Lake in 2009, and was elected to the town council on October 27, 2014. On May 4, 2018, she officially registered as a candidate for Lord Mayor of the Town of Niagara on the Lake for the October 2018 municipal election. Running on a platform of slowing down development, Disero defeated incumbent Patrick Darte by 4,169 votes to 2,743 in the October 22, 2018 election, becoming the first woman to hold the position of Lord Mayor of Niagara-on-the-Lake. She lost in her bid for re-election in 2022.

== Electoral record ==
Lord Mayor of Niagara-on-the-Lake, 2018 municipal election
| Candidate | Total votes | % of total votes |
|---|---|---|
| Betty Disero | 4,169 | 50.1 |
| Patrick Darte (X) | 2,743 | 33.0 |
| Daniel Turner | 1,402 | 16.9 |

Toronto City Council, Ward Seventeen, 2000 municipal election
| Candidate | Total votes | % of total votes |
|---|---|---|
| (x)Betty Disero | 8,711 | 83.33 |
| Romolo Cimaroli | 1,743 | 16.67 |
| Total valid votes | 10,454 | 100.00 |

Toronto City Council, Ward Twenty-One, 1997 municipal election (two members)
| Candidate | Total votes | % of total votes |
|---|---|---|
| (x)Betty Disero | 10,747 | 28.86 |
| Dennis Fotinos | 7,587 | 20.38 |
| Rob Maxwell | 6,858 | 18.42 |
| John Doherty | 5,096 | 13.69 |
| Tony Letra | 4,788 | 12.86 |
| Dale Ritch | 1,111 | 2.98 |
| Jennifer Bauer | 1,049 | 2.82 |
| Total valid votes | 37,236 | 100.00 |

Electors could vote for two candidates in the 1997 election.
The percentages are determined in relation to the total number of votes.

Toronto City Council, Ward Twelve, 1994 municipal election
| Candidate | Total votes | % of total votes |
|---|---|---|
| (x)Betty Disero | 6,360 | 68.41 |
| Fred Dominelli | 2,937 | 31.59 |
| Total valid votes | 9,297 | 100.00 |

Toronto City Council, Ward Twelve, 1988 municipal election
| Candidate | Total votes | % of total votes |
|---|---|---|
| (x)Betty Disero | acclaimed | |

Toronto City Council, Ward Three, 1985 municipal election
| Candidate | Total votes | % of total votes |
|---|---|---|
| Betty Disero | 5,096 | 45.98 |
| (x)Joseph Piccininni | 3,835 | 34.60 |
| Judy DeSousa | 1,871 | 16.88 |
| Nick Alfarano | 282 | 2.54 |
| Total valid votes | 11,084 | 100.00 |

Results taken from The Globe and Mail, 14 November 1985. The final official results were not significantly different.

Toronto Public School Board, Separate School Representative, Area One, 1982 municipal election (238/240)
| Candidate | Total votes | % of total votes |
|---|---|---|
| Betty Disero | 3,341 | 37.51 |
| Steve Horodecky | 2,787 | 31.29 |
| (x)Mary R. Cortese | 2,778 | 31.19 |
| Total valid votes | 8,906 | 100.00 |

Results taken from The Globe and Mail, 9 November 1982. The final results were not significantly different.

| Preceded by Brian Ashton | Chair of the Toronto Transit Commission; 2002-2003 | Succeeded by Howard Moscoe |
