= Cesar Palacio =

Canadian politician

Toronto City Councillor for (Ward 17) Davenport
- In office December 1, 2003 – December 1, 2018
- Preceded by: Betty Disero
- Succeeded by: Ana Bailão

Toronto City Councillor for (Ward 21) Davenport
- In office March 1, 2000 – December 1, 2000
- Preceded by: Dennis Fotinos
- Succeeded by: Ward Abolished

Personal details
- Born: Ecuador
- Relatives: Alfredo Palacio (cousin)
- Occupation: Public Administrator

Cesar Palacio (/pəˈlæsioʊ/ pə-LASS-ee-oh, Spanish: [ˈsesaɾ paˈlasjo]) is a Canadian politician. He was the Toronto city councillor for Ward 17 Davenport during the years 2003–2018. He was the first Hispanic person to be elected to Toronto's City Council.

== Biography ==
Born in Ecuador he followed his father to Toronto in 1972. Working several blue-collar jobs he first became involved in politics as a volunteer with local MP Charles Caccia. In 1985, he was hired the executive assistant to Councillor Betty Disero, and he remained in the office for several years. For a few months in 2000, he was appointed to fill the seat vacated by Dennis Fotinos, but the appointment was conditional on him not running in the subsequent election. In the 2003 Toronto election, he ran to succeed Disero and won. He also won subsequent re-election in the 2006 Toronto election. He is fluent in Italian, English, Spanish and Portuguese. He is a cousin of the late former President of Ecuador, Alfredo Palacio.

In the 2010 Toronto election, Palacio won re-election over six other candidates: Brian Bragason, Tony Letra, Maria Marques, Kar Rasaiah, Jonah Schein, and Ben Stirpe. He was one of five Councillors removed from the TTC board by council in March 2012 as a result of voting to terminate the services of the TTC General Manager Gary Webster.

Palacio ran again in the 2014 Toronto election defeating a strong challenger Alejandra Bravo. On June 11, 2015, Palacio supported the Hybrid option for the Gardiner Expressway.

Changes to the City of Toronto ward boundaries imposed by the Ontario Provincial Government of Doug Ford resulted in the disappearance of former Ward 17 Davenport in the 2018 municipal election. Palacio initially announced he would run for re-election in the new larger Ward 9 Davenport in the 2018 Toronto election but ultimately withdrew his candidacy.

== Election results ==
2014 Toronto election, Ward 17
Candidate	Votes	%
Cesar Palacio	8,293	46.24%
Alejandra Bravo	7,840	43.71%
Saeed Selvam	1,404	7.83%
George Stevens	398	2.22%
Total	17,935	100%

2010 Toronto election, Ward 17
Candidate	Votes	%
Cesar Palacio	6,154	42.8
Jonah Schein	4,827	33.6
Tony Letra	2,035	14.2
Ben Stirpe	751	5.2
Maria Marques	388	2.7
Brian Bragason	125	0.9
Kar Rasaiah	94	0.7
Total	14,374	100

2006 Toronto election, Ward 17
Candidate	Votes	%
Cesar Palacio	4,827	42.3
Alejandra Bravo	4,546	39.8
Fred Dominelli	1,491	13.1
Cinzia Scalabrini	211	1.9
David Faria	206	1.8
Gustavo Valdez	77	0.7
Wilson Basantes Espinoza	50	0.4
