= Ward 2 Etobicoke Centre =

Municipal council district in Toronto, Ontario, Canada

- Constituency for the Toronto City Council
- Location of Ward 2 in Toronto
- City: Toronto
- Population: 118,020 (2016)

Current constituency
- Created: 2018
- Councillor: Stephen Holyday
- Community council: Etobicoke/York
- Created from: Ward 3; Ward 4
- First contested: 2018 election
- Last contested: 2026 election
- Ward profile: www.toronto.ca/ward-2-etobicoke-centre/

Ward 2 Etobicoke Centre is a municipal electoral division in Toronto, Ontario, Canada that has been represented in the Toronto City Council since the 2018 municipal election. It was last contested in 2026, with Stephen Holyday being elected councillor.

== Boundaries ==
On August 14, 2018, the Government of Ontario redrew municipal boundaries via the Better Local Government Act, 2018, S.O. 2018, c. 11 - Bill 5. This means that the 25 provincial electoral districts and the 25 municipal wards in Toronto currently share the same geographic borders.

Defined in legislation as:

Consisting of that part of the City of Toronto described as follows: commencing at the intersection of the westerly limit of said city with Highway No. 401; thence easterly along said highway to Highway No. 427; thence easterly along said highway and Eglinton Avenue West to Martin Grove Road; thence northerly along said road to Dixon Road; thence easterly along said road and its easterly production to the Humber River; thence generally southeasterly along said river to Dundas Street West; thence southwesterly along said street to the Canadian Pacific Railway; thence southerly along said railway to Mimico Creek; thence generally northwesterly along said creek to Kipling Avenue; thence southerly along said avenue to Bloor Street West; thence westerly along said street to Highway No. 427; thence southerly along said highway to Dundas Street West; thence westerly along said street to the westerly limit of said city; thence generally northwesterly along said limit to the point of commencement.

== History ==
=== 2018 Boundary Adjustment ===
Toronto municipal ward boundaries were significantly modified in 2018 during the election campaign. Ultimately the new ward structure was used and later upheld by the Supreme Court of Canada in 2021.

The current ward is an amalgamation of the old Ward 3 (western section), the old Ward 4 (eastern section).

=== 2018 municipal election ===
Ward 2 was first contested during the 2018 municipal election. Then-Ward 3 incumbent Stephen Holyday was elected with 38.58 per cent of the vote.

=== 2022 municipal election ===
Stephen Holyday was comfortably re-elected in 2022 with 72.28 per cent of the vote.

== Geography ==
Etobicoke Centre is part of the Etobicoke and York community council.

The ward's west boundary is the municipal border with the Region of Peel, and the east boundary is the Humber River. The north boundary is roughly along Eglinton Avenue, Martin Grove Road and Dixon Road, and the south boundary is roughly along the Mimico Creek, Dundas Street, Kipling Avenue, Bloor Street and Highway 427.

== Councillors ==
Council term	Member	
Council term	Ward 3 Etobicoke Centre	Ward 4 Etobicoke Centre
2000–2003	Doug Holyday	Gloria Lindsay Luby
2003–2006	Doug Holyday	Gloria Lindsay Luby
2006–2010	Doug Holyday	Gloria Lindsay Luby
2010–2014	Peter Leon	Gloria Lindsay Luby
2014–2018	Stephen Holyday	John Campbell
	Ward 2 Etobicoke Centre	
2018–2022	Stephen Holyday	
2022–2026	Stephen Holyday	
2026–2030	Stephen Holyday	

== Election results ==
2026 Toronto municipal election

Candidate	Vote	%	minus
Stephen Holyday (X)	25,606	57.73	14.55 ▼
Katie Andrachuk	12,238	27.59	–
Jennifer Alexander	6,508	14.67	–

2022 Toronto municipal election, Ward 2 Etobicoke Centre
Candidate	Vote	%
Stephen Holyday (X)	18,559	72.28
Thomas Yanuziello	2,653	10.33
Catherine Habus	2,218	9.03
Maryam Hashimi	1,591	6.20
Sam Raufi	557	2.17

2018 Toronto municipal election, Ward 2 Etobicoke Centre
Candidate	Votes	Vote share
Stephen Holyday	14,627	38.58%
John Campbell	13,441	35.45%
Angelo Carnvale	5,735	15.13%
Erica Kelly	3,854	10.16%
Bill Boersma	258	0.68%
Total	37,915	100%
Source: City of Toronto

== See also ==
- Municipal elections in Canada
- Municipal government of Toronto
- List of Toronto municipal elections
