= Stephen Holyday =

Canadian politician

Deputy Speaker of Toronto City Council
- In office November 23, 2022 – August 8, 2023
- Preceded by: Shelley Carroll
- Succeeded by: Paula Fletcher

Toronto City Councillor for Ward 2 Etobicoke Centre
- Incumbent
- Assumed office December 1, 2018
- Preceded by: Ward created

Toronto City Councillor for Ward 3 Etobicoke Centre
- In office December 1, 2014 – December 1, 2018
- Preceded by: Peter Leon
- Succeeded by: Ward abolished

Personal details
- Born: 1975 or 1976 (age 50–51) Toronto, Ontario, Canada
- Spouse: Margaret Holyday
- Children: 3
- Parent: Doug Holyday (father)

Stephen Holyday is a Canadian politician who has served on Toronto City Council since 2014 and currently represents Ward 2 Etobicoke Centre. He was first elected in the old Ward 3 Etobicoke Centre during the 2014 municipal election.

== Background ==
Holyday was born in Toronto, Ontario. He is the son of Doug Holyday, who was the previous ward councilor, Mayor of Etobicoke, and briefly a member of Provincial Parliament (MPP). He and his wife Margaret have three children.

He graduated from Ryerson University with a Bachelor of Technology in Architectural Science. From 1999 to 2014, he was a manager at the provincial Ministry of Energy.

== Politics ==
Holyday is a fiscal conservative. He describes himself as taking "a tough stance against congestion causing initiatives", including the Eglinton Crosstown LRT and the King Street Transit Priority Corridor. He opposes building new bike lanes and new multi-unit housing in neighbourhoods that consist of single-family homes.

Alex Bozikovic, The Globe and Mail's architecture critic, called Holyday "furiously anti-development". He has also been described as one of "three Toronto councillors hopelessly exacerbating the housing crisis" by More Neighbours Toronto.

Holyday is often an outlier among city councillors, and has been the only dissenting vote on dozens of council votes.

He endorsed Mark Saunders in the 2023 Toronto mayoral by-election.

== Election results ==
2026 Toronto election, Ward 2
Candidate	Vote	%
Stephen Holyday (X)	25,606	57.73
Katie Andrachuk	12,238	27.59
Jennifer Alexander	6,508	27.59

2022 Toronto election, Ward 2
Stephen Holyday (X)	18,559	72.28
Thomas Yanuziello	2,653	10.33
Catherine Habus	2,218	9.03
Maryam Hashimi	1,591	6.20
Sam Raufi	557	2.17

Both Holyday and John Campbell were incumbents in the 2018 Toronto election because Ward 2 and Ward 3 were merged into a single ward.

2018 Toronto election, Ward 2
Candidate	Votes	%
Stephen Holyday	14,627	38.58%
John Campbell	13,441	35.45%
Angelo Carnevale	5,735	15.13%
Erica Kelly	3,854	10.16%
Bill Boersma	258	.68%
Total	22,119	100%

2014 Toronto election, Ward 3
Candidate	Votes	%
Stephen Holyday	8,086	36.557%
Annette Hutcheon	5,135	23.215%
John Moskalyk	2,701	12.211%
George Bauk	1,611	7.283%
Dean French	1,399	6.325%
Greg Comeau	1,100	4.973%
Peter Fenech	1,025	4.634%
Roberto Alvarez	552	2.496%
Paola Bauer	313	1.415%
Frank D'Urzo	197	0.891%
Total	22,119	100%
