= Joe Piccininni =

Canadian politician (1922–1995)

Toronto City Councillor for Davenport (Ward 3)
- In office 1969–1985 Serving with Hugh Bruce, Michael Goldrick, Richard Gilbert
- Preceded by: Hugh Bruce
- Succeeded by: Betty Disero

Toronto City Councillor for Trinity-Bellwoods (Ward 4/5)
- In office 1960–1966 Serving with George Ben, Harold Menzies
- Preceded by: Philip Givens
- Succeeded by: Tony O'Donohue

Personal details
- Born: January 15, 1922; Toronto, Ontario
- Died: September 16, 1995 (aged 73); Toronto, Ontario
- Occupation: Restaurant owner

Joseph J. Piccininni (born Guiseppe Piccininni, January 15, 1922 – September 16, 1995) was a long-serving city councillor in Toronto, Ontario, Canada. He represented the Corso Italia area on city council for 25 years.

== Background ==
Born in Toronto, Piccininni was educated at De La Salle College and then joined his family's produce business and opened a restaurant named Piccininni's.

He was very involved in soccer in the city and in southern Ontario and Quebec. He was president of the National Soccer League, with teams in Toronto, Hamilton, Kitchener, Ottawa, Sudbury, London, St. Catharines, Windsor and Montreal, from 1965 to 1977 a span of 12 years. He was elected vice-president of the Canadian Soccer Association at the 1973 AGM of the national governing body, and held this position until the 1979 AGM.

== Politics ==
He was elected to city council in 1960 for a ward covering a working class area of west Toronto with a large Italian-Canadian population. He was the first representative ever elected to city council from Toronto's large Italian community. He played an instrumental role in the construction of Lamport Stadium, which served as a home venue for many National Soccer League teams. On council he was a strong supporter of the right wing, generally taking conservative and pro-development stances. In 1982, he raised an unsuccessful motion to have the LGBT magazine The Body Politic banned from city council's press gallery after the magazine ran a cover story on the Sisters of Perpetual Indulgence, which Piccininni took as an affront to his Roman Catholic faith.

In the 1985 municipal election he was ousted in a surprise upset by 28-year-old school board trustee Betty Disero.

== Later life ==
After the defeat former mayor, and then cabinet minister, David Crombie had Piccininni appointed as a federal citizenship judge. His colleagues on city council also voted to name the Joseph J. Piccininni Recreation Centre in his honour.
