= John Campbell (Ontario politician) =

Canadian politician

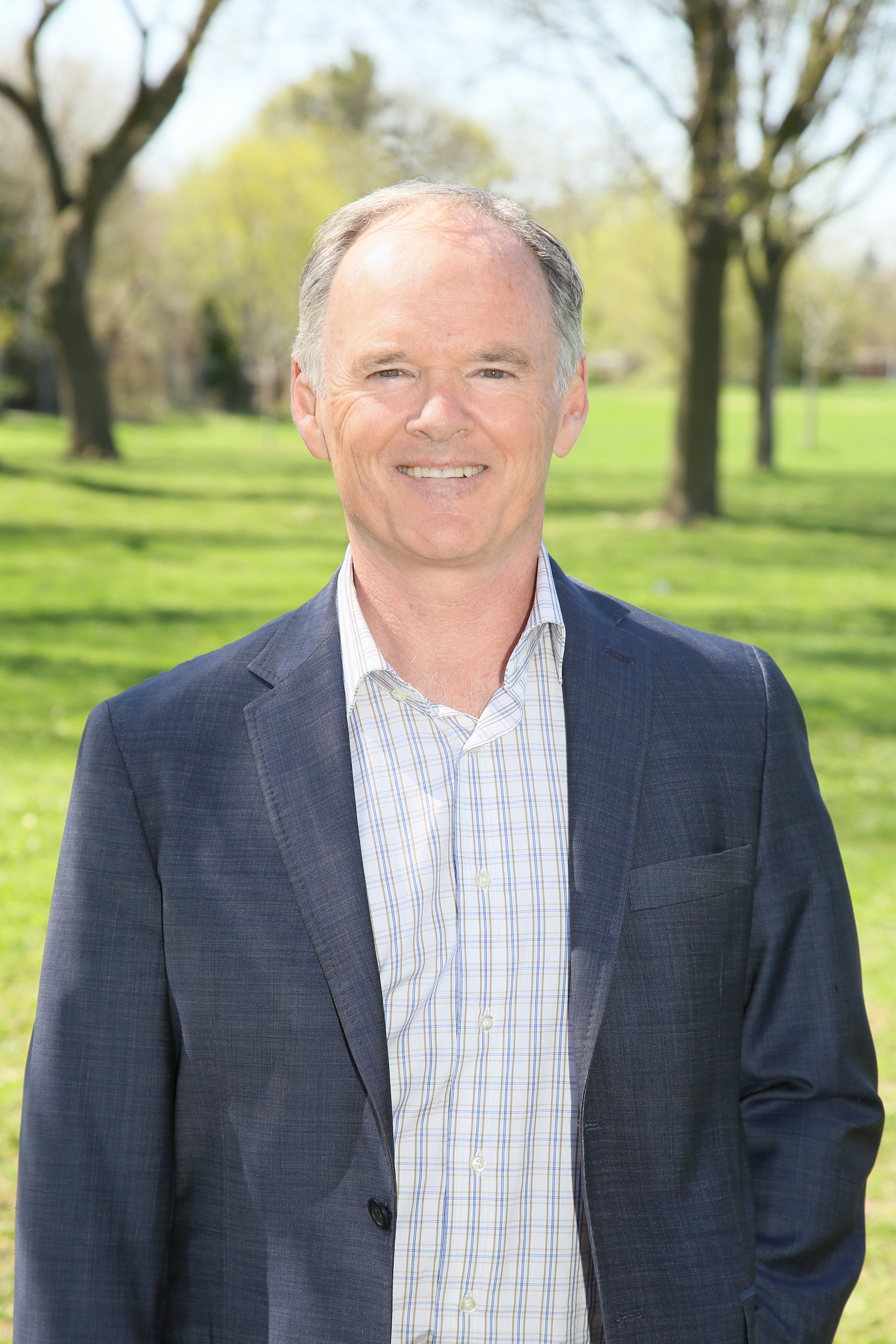

Toronto City Councillor for Ward 4 (Etobicoke Centre)
- In office December 1, 2014 – December 1, 2018
- Preceded by: Gloria Lindsay Luby
- Succeeded by: Ward Abolished

Toronto Public School Trustee for (Ward 2) Etobicoke Centre
- In office December 1, 2003 – December 1, 2010
- Succeeded by: Chris Glover

Personal details
- Occupation: Marketing consultant

John Campbell is a Canadian politician, who was elected to Toronto City Council in the 2014 municipal election.

He represented Ward 4 (Etobicoke Centre) from 2014 to 2018. During his term of office he served on many high-profile council committees and city agencies including the Budget Committee, the Planning Growth Management Committee and the Toronto Transit Commission.

Campbell is a graduate of the University of Toronto in political science and economics. He earned an MBA from the Schulich School of Business in finance and strategic management) after four and a half years of evening study in 1999.

He ran for councillor in the newly formed Ward 2 Etobicoke Centre in the 2018 Toronto election and lost by a small margin to Stephen Holyday.

Prior to his election as councillor in 2014, Campbell worked as a sales and marketing consultant, and was a trustee and chair of the Toronto District School Board.

He ran for councillor in Ward 4 (Etobicoke Centre) in the 2010 election, losing narrowly to incumbent councillor Gloria Lindsay Luby.

Campbell was nominated as the Ontario Liberal Party candidate for Etobicoke Centre in the 2025 Ontario general election.

== Electoral record ==
2025 Ontario general election: Etobicoke Centre
Party	Candidate	Votes	%	±%
Progressive Conservative	Kinga Surma	22,261	48.10	–0.49
Liberal	John Campbell	19,358	41.84	+7.79
New Democratic	Giulia Volpe	2,151	4.65	–3.96
Green	Brian Morris	1,000	2.16	–2.33
New Blue	Mario Bilusic	658	1.41	–1.05
Canadians' Choice	Paul Fromm	479	1.04	N/A
None of the Above	Richard Kiernicki	192	0.41	–0.03
Special Needs	Signe Miranda	180	0.39	N/A
Total valid votes/expense limit		46,263	99.40	+0.04
Total rejected, unmarked, and declined ballots		280	0.60	–0.04
Turnout		46,543	48.13	–0.42
Eligible voters		96,704		
Progressive Conservative hold		Swing		–4.14
Source(s): "Candidates in: Etobicoke Centre (028)". Voter Information Service. Elections Ontario.; "Vote Totals From Official Tabulation" (PDF). Elections Ontario. 3 March 2025.

2018 Toronto election, Ward 2
Candidate	Votes	%
Stephen Holyday	14,627	38.58%
John Campbell	13,441	35.45%
Angelo Carnvale	5,735	15.13%
Erica Kelly	3,854	10.16%
Bill Boersma	258	.68%
Total	37,555	100%

2014 Toronto election, Ward 4
Candidate	Votes	%
John Campbell	8,227	34.44
Niels Christensen	6,847	28.66
Angelo Carnevale	4,968	20.79
Chris Stockwell	2,208	9.24
Adam Slobodian	384	1.60
Tony Chun	286	1.19
William Murdoch	278	1.16
Rosemarie Mulhall	267	1.11
Mario Magno	216	0.90
Oscar Vidal-Cavet	205	0.85
Total	23,886	100

2010 Toronto election, Ward 4
Candidate	Votes	%
Gloria Lindsay Luby	9,789	46.90
John Campbell	9,480	45.42
Daniel Bertolini	1,602	7.67
Total	20,871	100
