= Dream Unlimited =

Canadian real estate company

Dream Unlimited Corporation
- Type: Public
- Traded as: TSX: DRM
- Industry: Real estate development
- Founded: 1996
- Headquarters: Toronto
- Key people: Michael Cooper, Chief Responsible Officer
- Total assets: $28B (2025)
- Number of employees: 695 2026
- Website: dream.ca

Dream Unlimited Corporation is a Canadian real estate company that owns, manages and develops real estate, headquartered in Toronto, Ontario. Through public and private investment vehicles, Dream manages approximately $31 billion of assets under management.

== History ==
Dream Unlimited Corp.was founded in 1996 by Michael Cooper.

In May 2013, Dream Unlimited Corp. became a public company pursuant to a plan of arrangement involving Dundee Corporation, Dream, Dream Asset Management Corporation and Sweet Dream Corp. The company's Subordinate Voting Shares and Series 1 Preference Shares began trading on the Toronto Stock Exchange on May 31, 2013.

In 2021, Dream Unlimited had $15 billion of assets under management, $9 billion of which are fee earning. It owned 11.2 million square feet of commercial rentable real estate, including 26,018 residential rental units.

By 2021, it has completed construction of $38 billion of commercial real estate and renewable energy infrastructure.

In January 2022, the company launched the Dream Community Foundation, not-for-profit organization.

In January 2023, Toronto's former deputy mayor Ana Bailão joined Dream Unlimited as the head of affordable housing and public affairs. Bailão resigned from her role in March 2023, as she announced her campaign to be the next mayor of Toronto.

In April 2023, tenants of the company's residential tower block on 33 King Street, Toronto protested after Dream Unlimited sought permission from the Landlord and Tenant Board to implement rent increases higher than the board's normal maximum.

In December 2025, Dream Unlimited Corp.and Dream Industrial REIT formed a partnership with the Canada Pension Plan Investment Board focused on Canadian industrial real estate assets.

At September 30, 2026 Dream Unlimited Corp. reported approximately $31 billion of assets under management across its public and private investment vehicles and partnerships.

== Projects ==
=== Distillery District ===
Dream Unlimited Corp. has ownership interests in Toronto's Distillery District, a mixed-use neighbourhood located on the site of the former Gooderham and Worts distillery. The district contains a collection of restored Victorian industrial buildings and has been redeveloped into a destination featuring retail, restaurants, cultural venues, offices and residential uses. It is recognized as one of the largest collections of preserved Victorian industrial architecture in North America.

=== Canary District ===
Dream participated in the development of Toronto's Canary District through Dundee Kilmer (Dream Kilmer) Developments, a partnership between Dream Unlimited and Kilmer Van Nostrand.

Located in the West Don Lands, the 35-acre master-planned community was originally developed as part of the athletes' village for the 2015 Pan American and Parapan American Games before being converted into a mixed-use residential neighbourhood. The community includes residential buildings, affordable housing, George Brown College's student residence and the 82,000-square-foot Cooper Koo YMCA.

=== Quayside ===
In 2022, Waterfront Toronto selected Dream Unlimited and Great Gulf Group to develop Quayside, a 4.9-hectare (12-acre) waterfront site in Toronto's East Bayfront district.

The project is planned as a mixed-use community incorporating housing, community spaces, retail and commercial uses, parks and public spaces.

The housing program includes purpose-built rental housing, condominium housing and affordable rental housing developed in partnership with Waterfront Toronto and the City of Toronto.

In 2026, Dream restructured its partnership with Great Gulf and assumed ownership of the Phase 1 rental component of the development.

=== Brightwater ===
Along with DiamondCorp, FRAM + Slokker, and Kilmer Group, Dream Unlimited is developing Brightwater, a 72-acre mixed-use waterfront community in Mississauga's Port Credit neighbourhood.

In 2019, Dream Unlimited proposed three designs to the City of Toronto to develop a downtown Toronto multi-storey property at 49 Ontario Street.

== Controversy ==
=== 2023-2024 Rent Strikes ===
In June 2023, over 200 tenants at 33 King Street, a residential building associated with Dream Unlimited Corp., began withholding rent in protest over what they described as abnormal rent increases and maintenance concerns. Tenants of the neighbouring building at 22 John Street later joined the action. On 15 July 2023, participants marched from the two buildings to the constituency office of local MPP Michael Ford and to the office of then–federal housing minister Ahmed Hussen.

Dream stated that several above-guideline rent increase (AGI) applications at 33 King Street were originally submitted by a previous landlord, and that the company offered individual hardship or extended-payment arrangements.

In September 2023, four months after the rent strike began, Toronto mayor Olivia Chow convened a mediation meeting. Dream Unlimited was invited but did not attend. The rent strikes continued into 2024; by January 2024, 76 active L1 eviction applications for 33 King Street had been filed with the Landlord and Tenant Board by Dream.

Subsequent media coverage reported that the rent strike lasted more than a year and concluded after roughly sixteen months. Organizers described the resolution as “amicable,” although full settlement details were not publicly disclosed.

=== Use of algorithmic price-setting software ===
In September 2024, The Breach reported that the property manager for 22 John Street said they were using YieldStar — RealPage’s rent-pricing software — to calculate estimated market rents.

In Canada, the Competition Bureau concluded its November 2025 civil investigation into rental-housing algorithmic pricing, finding that although software from RealPage and Yardi became more common, their adoption was not sufficiently widespread to demonstrate harm to competition, and no abuse of dominance or anticompetitive collaboration was established.
