= Build Canada Homes =

Public agency in Canada

- Maisons Canada

Agency overview
- Formed: September 14, 2025
- Jurisdiction: Government of Canada
- Minister responsible: Gregor Robertson, Minister of Housing, Infrastructure and Communities
- Agency executives: Ana Bailão, Chief Executive Officer
- Parent department: Housing, Infrastructure and Communities Canada
- Website: bch-mc.ca

Build Canada Homes (BCH; French: Maisons Canada; MC) is a special operating agency within Housing, Infrastructure and Communities Canada (HICC) created to build and finance affordable housing in Canada. It was launched on September 14, 2025.

== History ==
In the 2025 federal election campaign, Liberal leader Mark Carney proposed establishing a new agency to address Canada's housing crisis in 2025. The proposal includes details about its operation and objectives including:

- acting as a developer to build affordable housing on a large scale, including on public lands.
- provide over $25 billion in financing for prefabricated home builders and $10 billion in financing for affordable home builders.

The BCH proposal was presented with the goal of doubling the housing construction rate to 500,000 units per year. However, some critics argue that government intervention in the housing market could have unintended consequences, such as increasing housing costs in nearby areas. The initial investment was $13 billion, with an initial goal to use public land to build 4,000 prefabricated homes in six cities across Canada.

== Governance ==
Carney appointed former Toronto deputy mayor Ana Bailão, who previously served as the city's chair of planning and housing, as the agency's first chief executive officer. The organization is currently housed within HICC, with plans to incorporate it as a standalone agency reporting directly to the minister of housing and infrastructure in 2026.
