= Gloria Lindsay Luby =

Canadian politician

Toronto City Councillor for (Ward 4) Etobicoke Centre
- In office December 1, 2000 – December 1, 2014
- Preceded by: Ward Created
- Succeeded by: John Campbell

Deputy Speaker of Toronto City Council
- In office December 1, 2006 – December 1, 2010
- Preceded by: Position Created
- Succeeded by: John Parker

Chair of the Government Management Committee
- In office December 1, 2006 – September 28, 2009
- Preceded by: Position Created
- Succeeded by: Bill Saundercook

Toronto City Councillor for (Ward 3) Kingsway Humber
- In office January 1, 1998 – December 1, 2000
- Preceded by: Ward Created
- Succeeded by: Ward Abolished

Etobicoke City Councillor for Ward 7
- In office December 1, 1985 – January 1, 1998
- Succeeded by: City Amalgamated

Personal details
- Children: 3
- Occupation: Businesswoman

Gloria Lindsay Luby is a former Canadian politician. Lindsay Luby was a Toronto city councillor and Deputy Speaker of Toronto City Council in Toronto, Ontario, Canada for Ward 4 Etobicoke Centre. She represented one of the two Etobicoke Centre wards. Lindsay Luby is also a former chair of the Government Management Committee.

== Career ==
Lindsay was a businesswoman and consultant before entering politics. She first served as a trustee on the Etobicoke school board, and then became an Etobicoke city councillor. When Etobicoke was merged with the City of Toronto and four other municipalities in 1997, she was elected to the Toronto City Council. She was a member of the Toronto Police Services Board from December 2000 to December 2003. She served as acting chair of the Toronto Police Services Board from June to November 2013 after Norm Gardner stepped aside as board chair. Lindsay Luby also served as chair of the Economic Development and Parks Committee.

A member of the Ontario Progressive Conservative Party, she publicly mused about running in the 2003 provincial election to replace Chris Stockwell as the local Member of Provincial Parliament, and was courted by PC leader Premier Ernie Eves.

== Resignation ==
On September 28, 2009, Lindsay Luby resigned from the executive committee claiming that she felt marginalized and didn't agree with Toronto Mayor David Miller's agenda. She said, "I never felt part of that small inner circle" referring to other members of the executive committee who had closer ties to the mayor. She denied that her resignation had anything to do with Miller's recent announcement to not seek a third term as mayor. "I was reluctant to take this step while all the attention was focused on the mayor's re-election prospects," she said.

On August 28, 2014, Lindsay Luby announced that she would not seek re-election for her ward.

== Personal life ==
Lindsay Luby's holds a degree from the University of Western Ontario and a Master of Education degree from the University of Toronto. She and her husband have three children. She is of Ukrainian heritage.

== Election results ==
2010 Toronto election, Ward 4
| Candidate | Votes | % |
| Gloria Lindsay Luby | 9,789 | 46.9 |
| John Campbell | 9,480 | 45.4 |
| Daniel Bertolini | 1,602 | 7.7 |
| Total | 20,871 | 100 |

2006 Toronto election, Ward 4
| Candidate | Votes | % |
| Gloria Lindsay Luby | 9,979 | 68.5 |
| Shane Daly | 4,108 | 28.2 |
| Sam Mehta | 471 | 3.2 |
