= Ana Bailão =

Canadian politician, Toronto city councillor (born 1976)

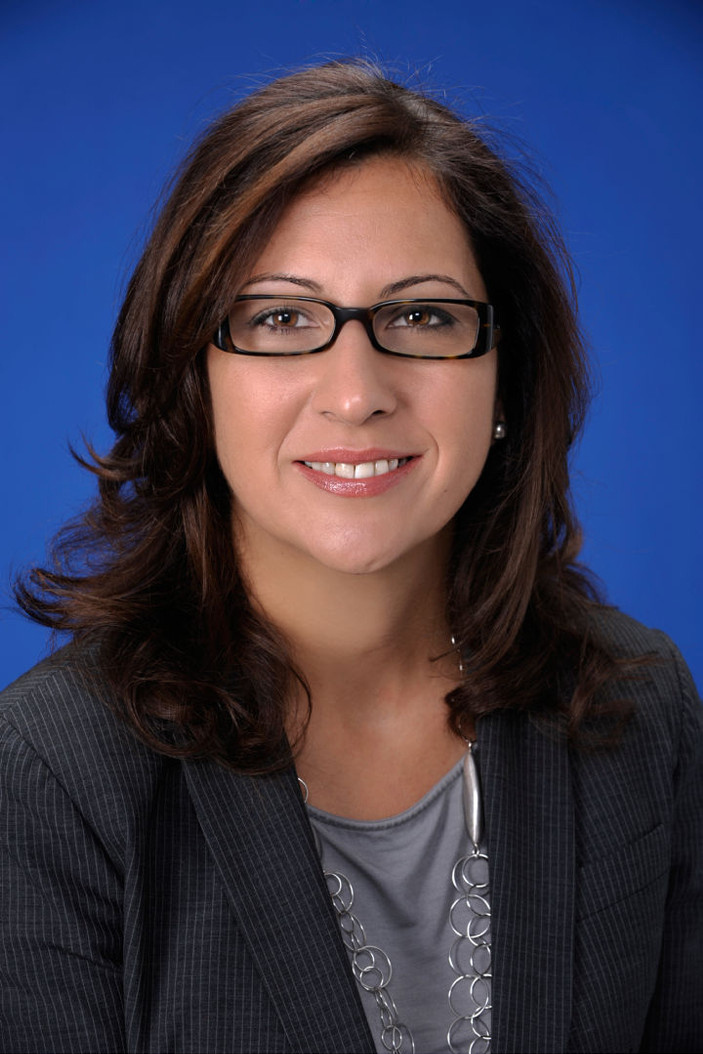
- Ana Bailão in 2011

Chief Executive Officer of Build Canada Homes
- Incumbent
- Assumed office September 14, 2025
- Prime Minister: Mark Carney

Deputy Mayor of Toronto for Toronto and East York
- In office October 6, 2017 – November 15, 2022
- Mayor: John Tory
- Preceded by: Pam McConnell
- Succeeded by: Ausma Malik (2023)

Toronto City Councillor for Ward 9 Davenport
- In office December 1, 2018 – November 15, 2022
- Preceded by: Ward created
- Succeeded by: Alejandra Bravo

Toronto City Councillor for Ward 18 Davenport
- In office December 1, 2010 – December 1, 2018
- Preceded by: Adam Giambrone
- Succeeded by: Ward dissolved

Personal details
- Born: 10 August 1976 (age 50) Vila Franca de Xira, Portugal
- Education: University of Toronto
- Occupation: Politician, property developer
- Website: anabailao.ca

Ana Bailão (born August 10, 1976) is a Canadian civil servant and former politician who has been the chief executive officer of Build Canada Homes since September 14, 2025. She previously represented Davenport on Toronto City Council from 2010 until 2022 and was deputy mayor of Toronto for Toronto and East York from 2017 to 2022.

Bailão was first elected to Toronto City Council in the 2010 municipal council election, representing Davenport. She was re-elected in 2014 and 2018 before declining to run in 2022. On council, Bailão sat on the Executive Committee, and served as chair of the Planning and Housing Committee. She worked extensively on housing issues, and her deputy mayor portfolio included responsibility for housing. Bailão was the runner-up in the 2023 Toronto mayoral by-election. In September 2025, Prime Minister Mark Carney appointed her as the CEO of Build Canada Homes.

== Early life and education ==
Ana Bailão was born on August 10, 1976, in Vila Franca de Xira, Portugal, and is a former resident of Alenquer. Her family moved to Canada and settled in Davenport when she was 15. She attended West Toronto Collegiate and the University of Toronto where she received a Bachelor of Arts degree in sociology and European studies.

== Political career ==
=== Early elections ===
In 2003, Bailão worked as an assistant to Ward 18 Councillor Mario Silva and put her name forward as a candidate to replace him in the election that year, running on a platform focusing on environmental issues, tenants rights and reduced property taxes for seniors. She finished in second place to Adam Giambrone.

In the 2010 municipal election, Giambrone entered the race to succeed David Miller as mayor and did not run as a councillor. Bailão sought the open seat in Ward 18. She described herself as "centre-left, maybe centr[ist]", running on a campaign of efficient service delivery and community involvement in decision making, and won the ward.

=== On council ===
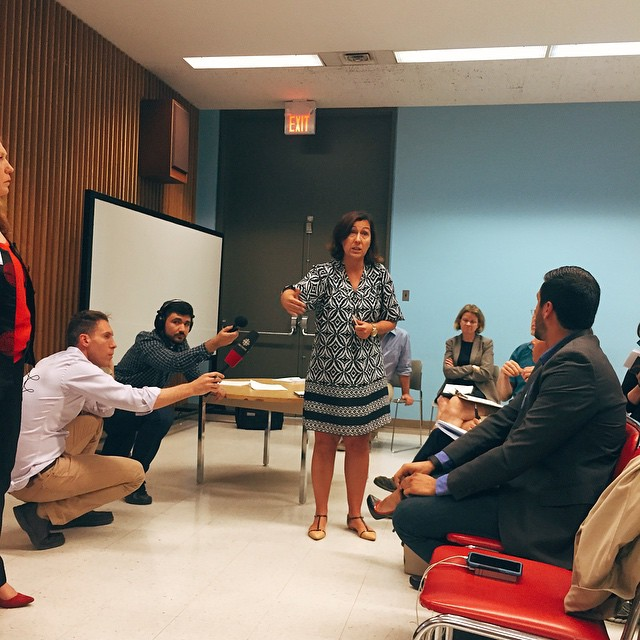
Bailão in 2015

In 2012, Bailão led a working group to look into problems with the city's community housing stock. Earlier in the year, Mayor Rob Ford had proposed to sell off 706 city owned houses to pay for repairs. Bailão's group issued a report that recommended selling only 55 houses. She said, "We recognize that some of our proposals might not be popular. Some might want the status quo, while others will think we should have gone further. But we think we have found the right balance."

She was re-elected in the 2014 Toronto municipal election.

In 2017, Mayor John Tory appointed Bailão as a non-statutory deputy mayor, for Toronto and East York – the city's south district – with a policy focus on housing.

Bailão was reelected in the new Ward 9 Davenport, an amalgamation of her previous ward 18 (Davenport) and ward 17 (Davenport) to the north after the Ford government readjusted the ward boundaries during the 2018 municipal election.

In 2020, Bailão voted against defunding the Toronto Police Service during the COVID-19 pandemic, despite the protest of local community organizations such as Black Lives Matter and Not Another Black Life.

=== Chair of the Affordable Housing Committee ===
On her appointment as the chair of the Affordable Housing Committee, Bailão commenced to seek to move the housing affordability issue to the centre of public policy actions at the City of Toronto.

==== Symposium on poverty, housing and homelessness ====
As part of this focus on affordable housing, in March 2011, Bailão convened a Symposium on Poverty, Housing and Homelessness that included the United Way Toronto, the Toronto Board of Trade, the Daily Bread Foodbank, and former mayor and Senator Art Eggleton. The symposium was among the first major undertakings to examine the then emerging inequity evolving between various income strata and the impact of this dynamic upon the city's neighbourhoods and housing sector.

==== Housing makes economic sense report ====
2011 saw the City of Toronto contending with significant financial pressures, coinciding with a reduction of funding from both the provincial and federal governments with respect to housing. In recognition of this reality, Bailão and the Affordable Housing Committee established a roundtable which included private-sector experts to consider how the facilitation of more affordable housing in Toronto in the absence of funding from the other levels of government, eventually producing a report. The plan included the creation of nearly 8,000 affordable homes and in excess of 13,000 well-paying construction jobs within 3 years. This report was well received as it was perceived as a method under which affordable housing could be advanced in the absence of substantial public funding.

==== Toronto Community Housing ====
In 2011, the Toronto Community Housing Corporation (TCHC) faced a repair backlog of $650 million. In response, the Toronto Community Housing Board recommended the sale of 872 stand alone houses to offset these costs, with 715 TCHC houses considered recommended as viable for selling. Excluding the 11 homes that had already been approved for sale by city council in previous reports, the TCHC Board recommended an additional 675 units be sold. The public and media response to this proposal was highly negative, with many groups voicing strong concern about how a large scale sell-off of affordable housing would affect the already over-burdened social housing waiting list. Three former mayors of Toronto also wrote a joint letter to express concerns about this proposal to sell the scattered houses in TCHC's portfolio and imploring that Toronto re-engage the federal and provincial governments in sustainable funding support for the growing repair backlog.

Bailão raised strong concerns about the impact of this sale to the City Social Housing portfolio. Bailão submitted a letter as chair of the Affordable Housing Committee to the Executive Committee, which was handling the TCHC report identifying these concerns.

In response to these concerns, Bailão requested the opportunity to lead a special housing working group in order to identify innovative solutions and creative partnerships. In its meetings on March 5, 6, and 7, city council approved Bailão's request and she was appointed to lead this working group along with management consultant Jim Pimblett, TCHC Board Chair Bud Perves and former cabinet minister Alan Redway. This working group was created to make findings on the proposed sale of the 619 TCHC homes, develop innovative solutions and new partnerships to address the repair backlog and create a strategy to re-engage the federal and provincial governments in providing affordable housing. This working group was asked to report back to Executive Committee in early fall, 2012, in order to provide recommendations to city council. Their final report, entitled "Putting People First", was released on September 17, 2012, and was widely well received by social housing advocates. By the time the final report was returned to Executive Committee on October 9, 2012, the working group's report recommendations had been informed by consultations with over 600 individuals and organizations. As a goal, the working group set out to raise $120 million over the next two years for housing repairs.

By 2013, TCHC's repair backlog had increased to $751 million. In March 2013, another of the Special Working Group's recommendations was implemented and realized when $93.5 million was unlocked as part of the refinancing of 18 mortgages at lower rates through Infrastructure Ontario. As a result, nearly $100 million was directed towards high-priority structural repairs in TCHC buildings.

The approval by city council of the mortgage renegotiation also marked a significant achievement for the Special Housing Working Group's report. In addition to the already implemented recommendations from the Special Working Group, the original target of raising $120 million towards the repair backlog was achieved in only the first 6 months of the report receiving council approval.

Bailão championed a Close the Housing Gap campaign which aimed to encourage the federal and provincial governments to continue funding social and co-op housing at existing levels as well as provide new long-term funding for social housing state of good repair work. The end result of this work and advocacy was a 10-year state of good repair plan that included a $1.3 billion investment over the decade from the federal government in addition to funding from the City. This 10-year plan is the first of its kind in the history of the country's largest social housing provider.

=== Chair of the Planning and Housing Committee ===
Under Bailão, the Planning and Housing Committee developed a 10-year action plan to address Toronto's housing challenges, the HousingTO 2020-2030 Housing Action Plan. The work of the committee also resulted in the Enhancing Housing Opportunities in Neighbourhoods plan, which included the approval of laneway suites, garden suites and coach houses which aimed at gentle densification in existing neighbourhoods. It identifies the need to advance efforts to amend Toronto zoning regulations to allow for densification within the city's "missing middle" – areas of the city where only single-family dwellings are permitted.

==== Work on housing programs ====
Bailão also led the City's Modular Housing Initiative, which aims to quickly deliver supportive housing to those experiencing homelessness or who had a history of chronic homelessness. She also worked on development of Toronto's Housing Now program, which was launched in 2019 and seeks to repurpose city-owned land for the development of affordable housing. Bailão supported the creation and implementation of the Open Door Affordable Housing Program in 2016, which aims to "streamline the process for developers who want to work with the city to build more affordable housing". Another program supported by Bailão is the Multi-Unit Residential Acquisition program, which provides $20 million in grant funding and City Open Door Program incentives to non-profit and Indigenous housing providers.

==== Vacant homes tax ====
Bailão advocated for the implementation of a vacant homes tax, which seeks to increase the housing supply by encouraging property owners to list their vacant houses, making them available to the rental housing market.

=== Retirement from council ===
Bailão announced in May 2022 that she would not be seeking re-election to Toronto City Council.

In September 2022, the Building Industry and Land Development Association honoured Bailão's work in addressing housing supply and affordability.

=== 2023 mayoral by-election ===
Following the resignation of Mayor John Tory, Bailão was widely speculated to be a potential candidate in the then-upcoming mayoral by-election. She explored launching a campaign with political strategists Tom Allison and Nick Kouvalis, who both advised Tory's campaigns.

On March 17, 2023, Bailão announced her intention to run for mayor of Toronto.

Bailão proposed reversing Toronto Transit Commission (TTC) budget cuts by uploading the city's municipal expressways – the Don Valley Parkway and Gardiner Expressway – to the provincial government, which would annually save $200 million. She highlighted the need to boost ridership back to pre-pandemic levels. Bailão also discussed expanding cellular service in the TTC subway system, describing it as a "convenience and safety issue", and stated that telecom providers have a "duty" to work with the city, which major firms have refused to do.

She has indicated she does not support the new strong-mayor powers brought in by the province which allow by-laws that align with provincial priorities to be passed with one-third support on council and disagrees with Tory, who requested them. However, she indicated that she supports the new powers which enhances the mayor's influence over the city budget, including the power to veto amendments.

She came in second in the election with 32.46% of the vote, losing to Olivia Chow.

== Build Canada Homes ==
In September 2025, Prime Minister Mark Carney appointed Bailão as the head of Build Canada Homes.

== Corporate career ==
Bailão joined Canadian real estate company Dream Unlimited in January 2023 as the Head of Affordable Housing and Public Affairs. She resigned from her position with Dream Unlimited after announcing her intention to run for mayor of Toronto.

== Legal issues ==
On October 16, 2012, Bailão was charged with impaired driving. As per Bailão, she was driving with a blood alcohol content of 0.130%, over the legal limit of 0.08%. After initially saying she would fight the charges she later reversed her decision and pleaded guilty to the charge of being above the legal limit, saying, "I made a bad choice. I take full responsibility for that and I accept the consequences." Mayor Rob Ford commented on the incident and said, "Ana is a good local councillor, she works hard and represents her residents well at City Hall. I look forward to continuing to work with her on council." She was convicted for having a blood alcohol content in excess of the legal limit and was sentenced to a 12-month licence suspension and a fine.

== Electoral history ==
2023 Toronto mayoral by-election
Candidate	Votes	%
Olivia Chow	268,676	37.17
Ana Bailão	234,647	32.46
Mark Saunders	62,017	8.58
Anthony Furey	35,839	4.96
Josh Matlow	35,516	4.91
Mitzie Hunter	21,170	2.93
Chloe Brown	18,763	2.60
95 other candidates	46,249	6.39
Total	722,877	100.00
Source: City of Toronto

2018 Toronto municipal election, Ward 9 Davenport
Candidate	Votes	Vote share
Ana Bailão	26,219	83.62%
Nahum Mann	2,804	8.94%
Troy Young	1,218	3.88%
Mark Balack	1,114	3.55%
Total	31,355	100%
Source: City of Toronto

2014 Toronto election, Ward 18
Candidate	Votes	Vote share
Ana Bailão	8,797	45.80%
Alex Mazer	7,992	41.61%
Mohammed Uddin	540	2.81%
Jolene Hunt	358	1.86%
Paul Alves	274	1.43%
Elsa Romao	270	1.41%
Jim McMillan	213	1.11%
Derek Power	198	1.03%
Bobby Beckett	182	0.95%
Joseph Ferrari	176	0.92%
Robert Rodrigues	131	0.68%
Dennis Pavao	76	0.40%
Total	19,207	100%
Source: City of Toronto

2010 Toronto election, Ward 18
Candidate	Votes	Vote share
Ana Bailão	6,277	43.75%
Kevin Beaulieu	4,911	34.23%
Frank de Jong	869	6.06%
Hema Vyas	776	5.41%
Joe MacDonald	669	4.66%
Kirk Russell	326	2.27%
Nha Le	154	1.07%
Ken Wood	106	0.74%
Mohammad Muhit	94	0.66%
Joanna Teliatnik	70	0.49%
Doug Carroll	52	0.36%
Abdirazak Elmi	42	0.29%
Total	14,346	100%
Source: City of Toronto

2003 Toronto election, Ward 18
Candidate	Votes	Vote share
Adam Giambrone	5,797	51.52%
Ana Bailão	4,537	40.32%
Hortencia Fotopoulos	386	3.43%
Nha Le	234	2.08%
Cynamin Maxwell	155	1.37%
Ana Salaverry-Chuquihuara	141	1.25%
Total	11,250	100%
Source: City of Toronto
