= Fred Dominelli =

Fred Dominelli is a Canadian businessman and municipal politician in Toronto, Ontario, Canada. He served as interim City Councillor in Toronto from May until November 2003. He is perhaps best known for speculatively purchasing land directly in the path of a proposed major roadway project in Toronto. The project was later cancelled.

On May 22, 2003, City Council appointed Dominelli as an interim councillor to fill the vacancy in Ward 17 that was created when Betty Disero resigned her seat. Dominelli served as councillor until the 2003 municipal election in November, 2003. A condition of the appointment was that he not run as a candidate in the 2003 election.

In the late 1990s, the City of Toronto made plans to extend Front Street west to Dufferin Street and the Gardiner Expressway to provide additional road capacity into downtown. Dominelli and business partner Dale Martin purchased land directly in the path of the proposed extension. He stood to make a profit of several million dollars from the sale of that land if the extension was built. Dominelli provided to the City of Toronto a valuable access point across his property at the foot of Jefferson Avenue to permit the tunnel for access to the GO train and Exhibition Place for residents and employees of the King Liberty Area. Dominelli had gone on record stating that he had no intention of selling the property, and had actually been frustrated by the City in his efforts to redevelop the property.

On May 9, 2006, Dominelli announced his intention to run in the 2006 municipal election in the same ward. He had the support of Laborers' International Union of North America locals 506 and 183 due to his strong support while still a City Councillor for members of Local 79 (Cleaners) when his Council motion stopped the contracting out of 340 jobs from the City. He finished third behind incumbent Cesar Palacio.

In May 2008, the City of Toronto formally cancelled the Front Street extension.
