= Peter Leon =

Toronto City Councillor for Ward 3 (Etobicoke Centre)
- In office October 10, 2013 – December 1, 2014
- Preceded by: Doug Holyday
- Succeeded by: Stephen Holyday

Personal details
- Born: 1942 (age 83–84)
- Occupation: building materials salesman
- Profession: former Chair of Etobicoke Hydro, Etobicoke Library Board

Peter Leon is a Canadian politician, who was appointed to Toronto City Council on October 10, 2013 to succeed Doug Holyday in Ward 3 (Etobicoke Centre).

A former building material salesman, Leon once served in the Etobicoke Library Board and as chair of Etobicoke Hydro. Leon was selected by the city council over Chris Stockwell, a former Member of Provincial Parliament, and Agnes Potts, a former member of Etobicoke's city council prior to the municipal amalgamation of Toronto in 1997.

Leon has been in Etobicoke for 56 years and lives in Eatonville, Toronto in Ward 5 Etobicoke—Lakeshore. He completed his term in 2014 after announcing he would not run for re-election.
