= Green box (container) =

Green Box Electronic Recyclers, Inc.
- Industry: Electronic waste/Carbon neutrality
- Founded: 2011
- Headquarters: Santa Ana, CA, United States
- Area served: California
- Key people: Matt Miller, Inventor of the Green Box, Founder/CEO of Green Box E.R.I. Scott Lukash, Vice President of Green Box E.R.I.
- Website: greenboxecycling.com

The Green Box (GB) is a large metal container, designed and utilized for free public disposal and recycling of electronic waste. It is produced and sold by an eponymous California company.

== Company history ==
Matt Miller of Huntington Beach, California created The Green Box in 2011. It is a 7-by-5-by-5-foot (2.1 m × 1.5 m × 1.5 m) box that is placed on private or public property within cities wherein businesses and residents unload their old and broken electronics 24 hours a day, 7 days a week. Green Boxes were first released to the public for beta-testing in January 2012, using bins manufactured and operated by Orange County-based Green Box Electronic Recyclers, Inc. (Green Box E.R.I.), in their Huntington Beach and other test markets. In March 2012, Green Box E.R.I. began expanding Green Box numbers into many cities throughout southern California including Costa Mesa, Laguna Beach, Westminster, Mission Viejo, Newport Beach, Tustin, Seal Beach and Sunset Beach.

A Green Box at a Circle K in Westminster, CA

A Green Box at a Lamborghini dealership in Costa Mesa, CA

The bins are highly recognizable in part because of their trademarked name and electric green coloration. Located in high traffic areas within multiple city regions of southern California, Green Boxes are exclusively serviced and managed by Green Box Electronic Recyclers, Inc. a California Corporation.

== Design and function ==
The shade of green chosen for Green Boxes is similar to that of a green highlighter marker. CEO Miller named the custom color ‘electric green’ and says his is the first company in the United States to apply this color to an unattended collection box. Green Box E.R.I. possesses a U.S. trademark related to the green coloration.

Close-up shot of a Green Box deposit slot

The deposit opening on a Green Box is large enough to fit most electronic waste including computers, DVD players, flat-screen computer monitors, LCDs, copiers, laptops, cell phones, musical devices such as iPods, household printers, fax machines, mice, image scanners, servers, digital cameras, calculators, electronic boards, cords and cables, CPUs, routers, stereo equipment, medical equipment, video cameras, VCRs, disc players and keyboards. Deposits are made by placing electronic waste on a large platform, and lifting up on the handle. Items fall downward into the box.

The graphics on a Green Box include the company’s phone number, website, logo, a data destruction statement, a warning against dumping, a ‘No CRT’ label, a list of items accepted, the company’s Facebook and Twitter handles, the words ‘RECYCLE OLD ELECTRONICS’, and ‘FREE TO THE PUBLIC’, and icons of various electronic gadgets.

== See also ==
- Blue Box (container)
- Green bin - composted materials
- Grey box - paper and cardboard
- Recycling bins - boxes with holes to allow users to drop in material for recycling
