= Don Valley North (provincial electoral district) =

Provincial electoral district in Ontario, Canada

Coordinates: 43.789°N 79.359°W

Ontario electoral district
- Location in Toronto

Provincial electoral district
- Legislature: Legislative Assembly of Ontario
MPP
Jonathan Tsao
Liberal
- District created: 2015
- First contested: 2018
- Last contested: 2025

Demographics
- Population (2021): 113,663
- Electors (2025): 80,978
- Area (km²): 24
- Pop. density (per km²): 4,736
- Census division: Toronto
- Census subdivision: Toronto

Don Valley North (French: Don Valley-Nord) is a provincial electoral district in Toronto, Ontario, Canada. It elects one member to the Legislative Assembly of Ontario.

Don Valley North consists of the part of the city of Toronto lying within the following limits: commencing at the intersection of Bayview Avenue and Steeles Avenue East; east to Victoria Park Avenue, south to Highway 401, west to the Don River East Branch, north to Finch Avenue East, west along Finch Avenue to Bayview Avenue, and then north along Bayview Avenue to the point of commencement.

This riding was created from parts of Willowdale and Don Valley East during the 2012 electoral redistribution.

== Geography ==
This riding is located in the northeastern part of the North York district in Toronto. It contains the neighbourhoods of Henry Farm, Bayview Village, Bayview Woods-Steeles, Hillcrest Village, Don Valley Village, and Pleasant View.

== Members of Provincial Parliament ==
Don Valley North
Assembly	Years	Member	Party
Riding created from Willowdale and Don Valley East
42nd	2018–2022	Vincent Ke	Progressive Conservative
43rd	2022–2023	Vincent Ke	Progressive Conservative
43rd	2023–2025	Vincent Ke	Independent
44th	2025–present	Jonathan Tsao	Liberal

== Election results ==
Winning party in each polling division of Don Valley North at the 2025 Ontario general election

2025 Ontario general election
Party	Candidate	Votes	%	±%
Liberal	Jonathan Tsao	13,375	43.77	+6.94
Progressive Conservative	Sue Liu	11,484	37.58	–9.82
Independent	Vincent Ke	3,005	9.83	–37.57
New Democratic	Ebrahim Astaraki	1,562	5.11	–4.76
Green	Andrew Armstrong	784	2.57	–1.15
New Blue	Annie Nolan	346	1.13	–1.04
Total valid votes		30,556	99.29	
Total rejected, unmarked and declined ballots		219	0.71	+0.13
Turnout		30,775	38.04	–2.72
Eligible voters		80,903		
Liberal gain from Progressive Conservative		Swing		▲8.38
Source: Elections Ontario

Winning party in each polling division of Don Valley North riding at the 2022 Ontario general election

2022 Ontario general election
Party	Candidate	Votes	%	±%	Expenditures
Progressive Conservative	Vincent Ke	15,041	47.41	+2.97	$61,647
Liberal	Jonathan Tsao	11,685	36.83	+5.91	$88,913
New Democratic	Ebrahim Astaraki	3,133	9.87	–11.00	$16,187
Green	Ostap Soroka	1,179	3.72	+1.16	$823
New Blue	Jay Sobel	690	2.17	–	$924
Total valid votes/expense limit		31,728	99.42	–	$109,620
Total rejected, unmarked and declined ballots		185	0.58	–0.40	
Turnout		31,913	40.76	–13.05	
Eligible voters		78,300			
Progressive Conservative hold		Swing		▼1.47	
Source: Elections Ontario

2018 Ontario general election
Party	Candidate	Votes	%	±%
Progressive Conservative	Vincent Ke	18,046	44.44	+11.76
Liberal	Shelley Carroll	12,557	30.92	–21.68
New Democratic	Akil Sadikali	8,476	20.87	+9.92
Green	Janelle Yanishewski	1,039	2.56	–0.85
Libertarian	Sarah Matthews	287	0.71	–
None of the Above	Alexander Verstraten	202	0.50	–
Total valid votes		40,607	99.02	
Total rejected, unmarked and declined ballots		403	0.98	
Turnout		41,010	53.81	
Eligible voters		76,211		
Progressive Conservative notional gain from Liberal		Swing		+16.72
Source: Elections Ontario

2014 general election redistributed results
Party	Vote	%
Liberal	18,001	52.60
Progressive Conservative	11,183	32.68
New Democratic	3,746	10.95
Green	1,167	3.41
Others	122	0.36

== See also ==
- List of Ontario provincial electoral districts
- Canadian provincial electoral districts
