= Andy Pringle =

Canadian bond trader and political activist

Andrew Pringle (born 1949 or 1950) is a retired bond trader and political activist linked with the Progressive Conservative Party of Ontario and the Conservative Party of Canada.

He was first appointed a member of the Toronto Police Services Board in 2011, was elected vice-chair of the board in January 2015, and, since the July 31, 2015 retirement of Alok Mukherjee, held the office of chair of the TPSB, until his retirement on September 30, 2019. He was reappointed to the board by Toronto City Council in 2015 by a vote of 28 to 11 with Councillor Michael Thompson leading the opposition to Pringle's reappointment saying: "He consistently rubber-stamped police actions, proposals and initiatives that were not in the best interest of the community... I would dare say that Mr. Pringle's silence on all the major issues that the board has faced has in fact been deafening."

Pringle was the chief of staff for John Tory when he was Leader of the Opposition as leader of the Progressive Conservatives in the Ontario legislature. He is also a longtime fundraiser for the party and former chair of its fundraising arm, the PC Ontario Fund. Pringle is the former managing director at RBC Capital Markets, and former chairman of RP Investment Advisors.

He is a former chair of the Canadian Foundation for AIDS Research (CANFAR), of the board of governors of Upper Canada College and of the Shaw Festival. Since August 2020 he has been the chair of the McMichael Canadian Art Collection board of trustees.

In 2013, when Mayor of Toronto Rob Ford was under intense police scrutiny, his brother, then Toronto City Councillor Doug Ford called for Pringle's resignation alleging that he was in a conflict of interest as he went on a fishing trip with Toronto Police Chief Bill Blair.

Pringle was the Progressive Conservative candidate in Etobicoke Centre during the 2007 provincial election, placing second with 34.13% of the vote.

In 2016, Pringle was reported to be a fundraiser for the federal Conservative Party of Canada leadership campaign of Kellie Leitch.

His wife is broadcaster Valerie Pringle.

Preceded by Alok Mukherjee; 2005 – 2015	Chair of the Toronto Police Services Board; July 2015 – September 30, 2019	Succeeded by Jim Hart; 2019 – present
