= Henry Farm =

Coordinates: 43.770°N 79.352°W

- Neighbourhood
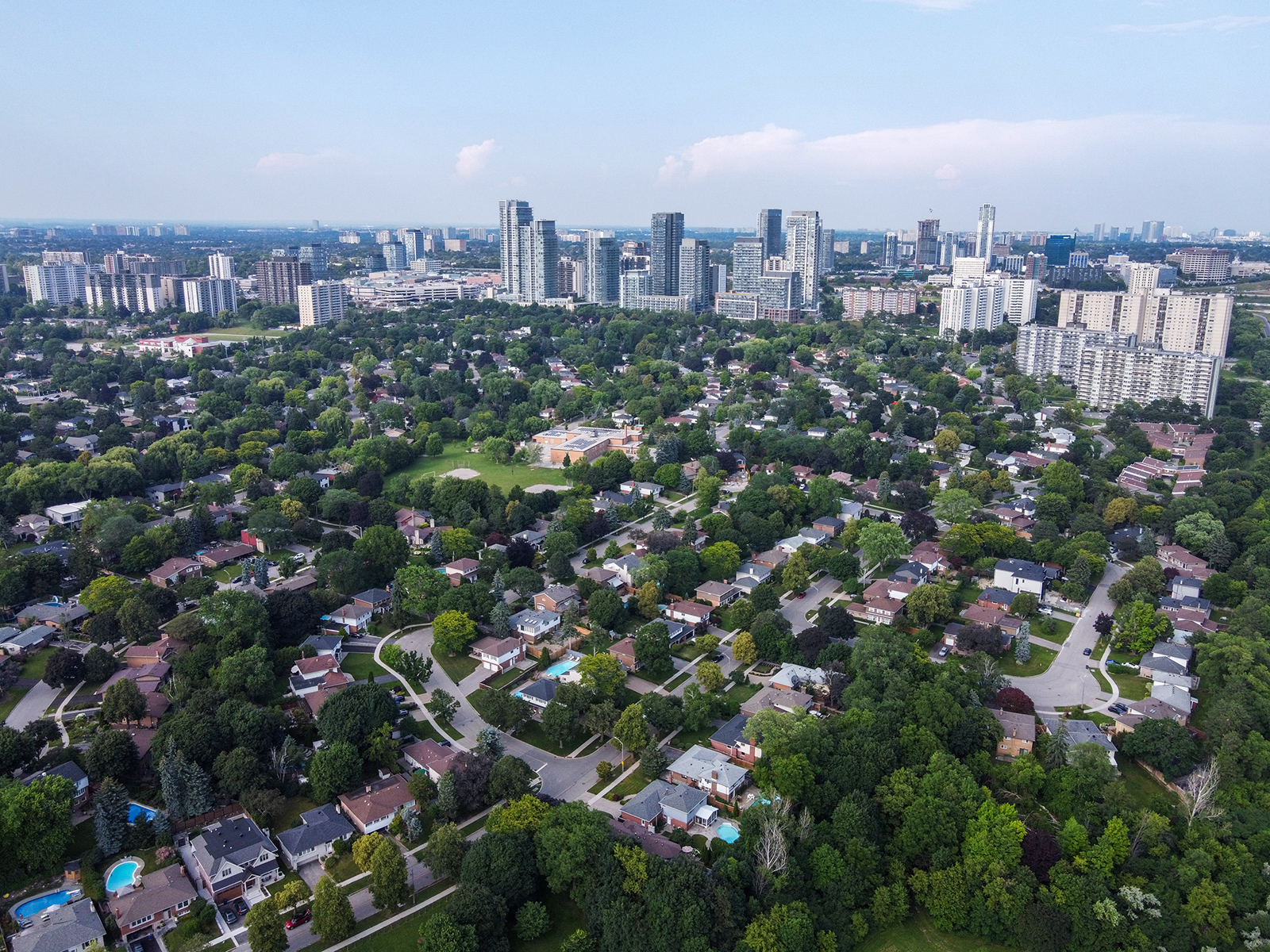
- Houses in Henry Farm (2023)

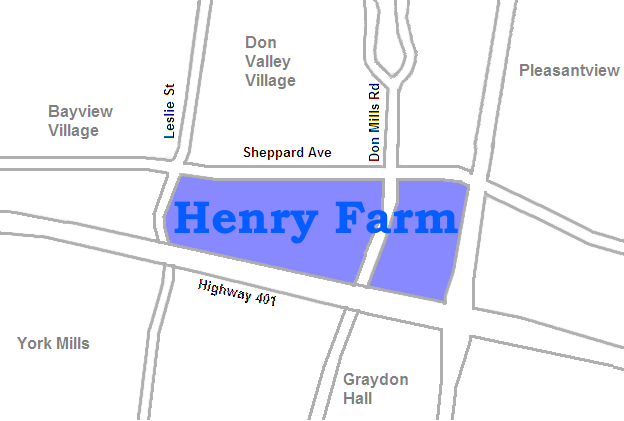
- Country: Canada
- Province: Ontario
- City: Toronto
- Settled: 1806
- Municipality established: 1850 York Township
- Changed municipality: 1922 North York from York Township
- Developed: 1964-72
- Changed municipality: 1998 Toronto from North York

Government
  - City Councillor: Shelley Carroll
  - Federal M.P.: Maggie Chi
  - Provincial M.P.P.: Jonathan Tsao

Henry Farm is a neighbourhood in the City of Toronto, Ontario, Canada. It is in the north-central part of Toronto within the former city of North York.

The City of Toronto has officially designated the neighbourhood of Henry Farm to encompass the Parkway Forest residential subdivision, between Don Mills Road and Highway 404. The neighbourhood is served by the Henry Farm Community Interest Association.

== History ==
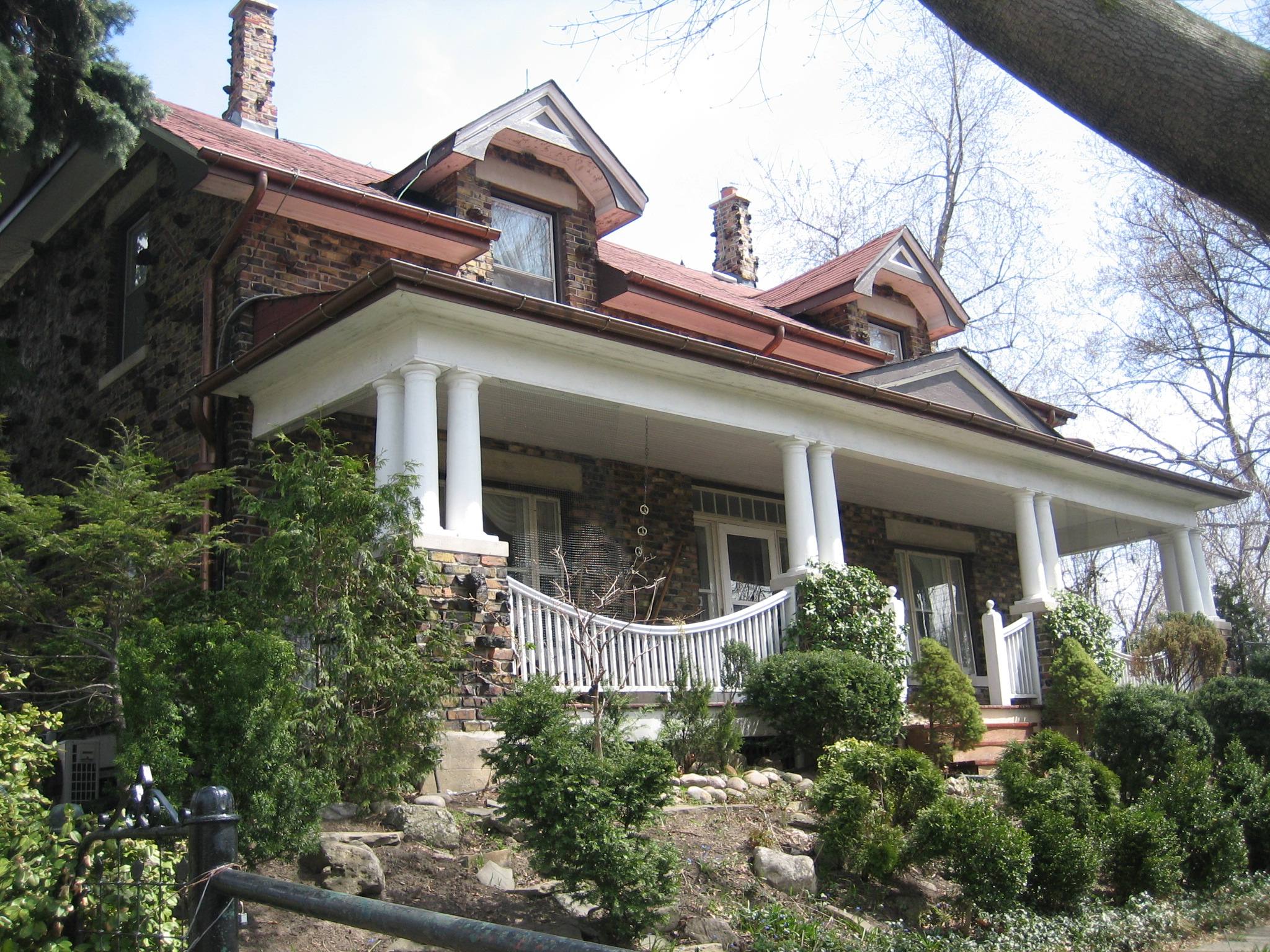
Built in 1824, Oriole Lodge was amongst the first buildings built in the neighbourhood.

Henry Farm was settled in 1806 by Henry Mulholland, a native of Clones, County Monaghan, Ireland. He sold the farm in 1814 to William Marsh Jr and past through a few owners including Mulholland's son-in-law (married to daughter Mary Ann), but his great-grandson, George Stewart Henry (son of Louisa Stewart and grandson to Mary Ann Mulholland), reacquired it in 1898. Henry was the tenth Premier of Ontario from 1930 to 1934. Ten days before his death in 1958, Henry sold his farm for CA$2 million to the developers of the present-day neighbourhood. Henry's house, called Oriole Lodge, still stands as a private residence at 17 Manorpark Court.

Henry Farm was developed into a housing subdivision in the 1960s. Most of the neighbourhood consists of low density suburban housing. Along the northeast and southeast are townhouse developments. The latter are primarily social housing. There are also two high-rise apartment buildings, Havenbrook Towers, at the southeast corner.

There is one church, located at 80 George Henry Boulevard, which houses the St. Matthew the Apostle, Oriole Anglican Church of Canada congregation. The church was built in 1969 and dedicated on January 25, 1970. The site was shared with the Covenant United Church. Covenant United Church amalgamated with Donway United Church in 1992, and moved out of Henry Farm.

== Education ==
The Toronto District School Board (TDSB) is a public school board that operates two elementary schools in Henry Farm, Forest Manor Public School, and Shaughnessy Public School. TDSB does not operate a secondary school in the neighbourhood, with TDSB students attending secondary schools in adjacent neighbourhoods.

In addition to TDSB, three other public school board also offers schooling to residents of Don Mills, the Toronto Catholic District School Board (TCDSB), secular school board; and two French first language public school board, the secular Conseil scolaire Viamonde (CSV), and it separate counterpart, Conseil scolaire catholique MonAvenir (CSCM). However, none of the three school boards operate school in Don Mills, with CSCM, CSV, and TCDSB students attending schools situated in other neighbourhoods in Toronto.

== Recreation ==
The neighbourhood is home to several municipal parks, including Havenbrook Park, and Parkway Forest Park. Havenbrook Park has a baseball diamond, toboggan hill and the Henry Farm Tennis Club. The park is near the Don Valley, which forms a part of the larger Toronto ravine system. Municipal parks in Toronto are managed by the Toronto Parks, Forestry and Recreation Division. The division also manages a community centre in the neighbourhood, Parkway Forest Community Centre.

== Transportation ==
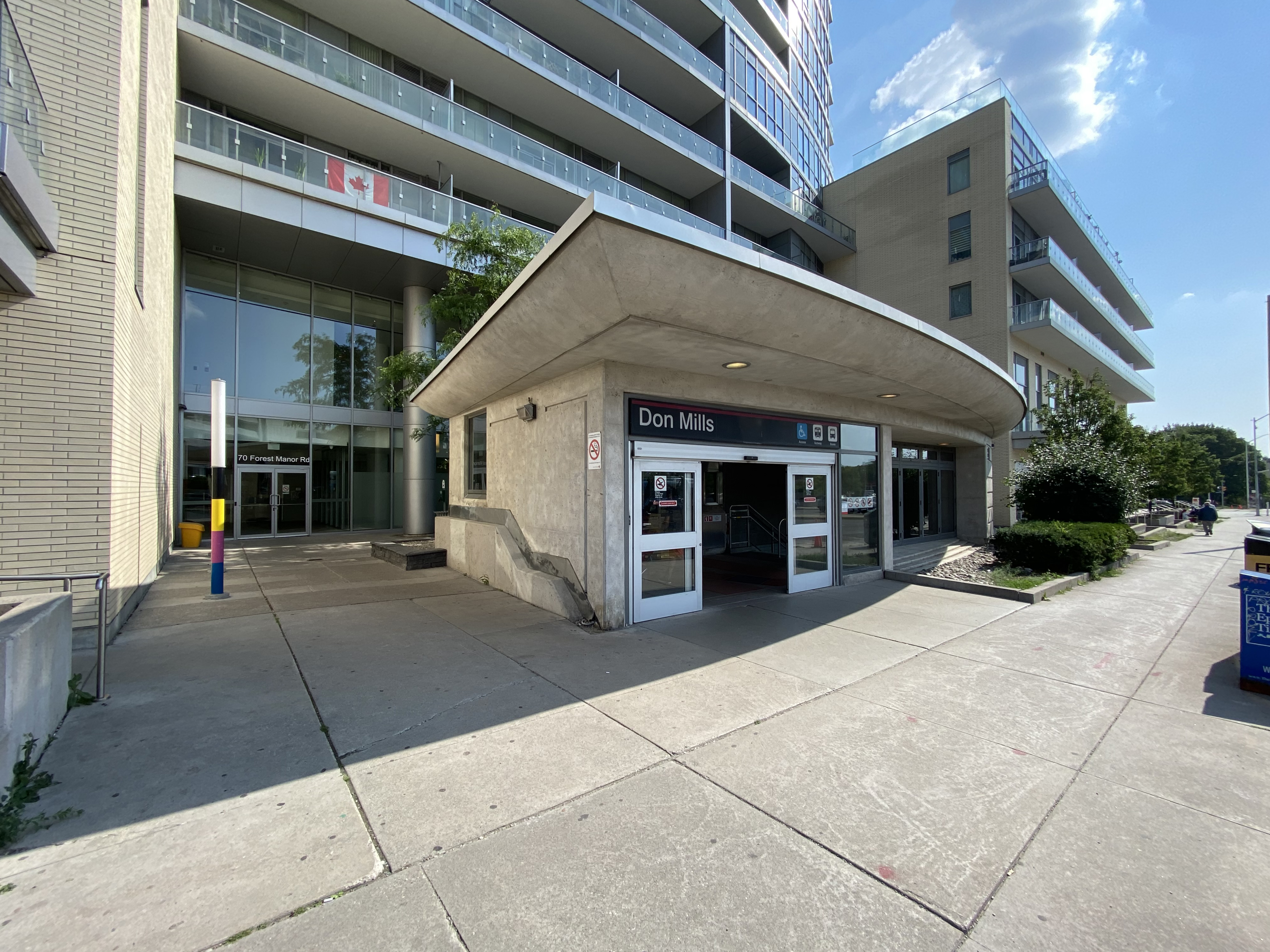
Entrance to the TTC's Don Mills station on the south side of Sheppard Avenue.

Several major thoroughfares bound the neighbourhood. Sheppard Avenue is a roadway that bounds Henry Farm in the north, while Highway 404 bounds the residential neighbourhood to the east. Highway 404 to provides access to York Region to the north and south to the Don Valley Parkway which starts at the 401/404 interchange just south of Sheppard Avenue. Highway 404 serves as a point of division between the primarily residential neighbourhood and the Consumers Business Park a commercial area to the east of the 404. The Business Park runs east to the Victoria Park Avenue. Highway 401 is the other major controlled access highway that bounds the neighbourhood from the south. The highway provides east–west access to the rest of Greater Toronto, and southern Ontario. The Don River's East Branch is the natural border to the west that passes under the Sheppard Avenue and Leslie Street intersection

Public transportation in the neighbourhood is provided by the Toronto Transit Commission (TTC), operating several bus routes through the neighbourhood. In addition, the Toronto subway may be accessed from Don Mills station, located at Don Mills Road, and Sheppard Avenue. Access to bus routes operated by York Region Transit may also be accessed at Don Mills station.
