= Ward 21 Scarborough Centre =

Municipal council district in Toronto, Ontario, Canada

- Constituency for the Toronto City Council
- Location of Ward 21 in Toronto
- City: Toronto
- Population: 111,560 (2021)

Current constituency
- Created: 2018
- Councillor: Michael Thompson
- First contested: 2018 election
- Last contested: 2026 election
- Ward profile: www.toronto.ca/city-government/data-research-maps/neighbourhoods-communities/ward-profiles/ward-21-scarborough-centre/

Ward 21 Scarborough Centre is a municipal electoral division in Toronto, Ontario, Canada, for the Toronto City Council. It was last contested in the 2026 municipal election, with Michael Thompson elected councillor.

== Boundaries ==
On August 14, 2018, the Government of Ontario redrew municipal boundaries via the Better Local Government Act, 2018, S.O. 2018, c. 11 - Bill 5. This means that the 25 provincial electoral districts and the 25 municipal wards in Toronto currently share the same geographic borders.

Defined in legislation as:

Consisting of that part of the City of Toronto described as follows: commencing at the intersection of Highway No. 401 with McCowan Road; thence southerly along said road to Lawrence Avenue East; thence easterly along said avenue to Bellamy Road North; thence generally southerly along said road and its southerly production to Eglinton Avenue East; thence westerly along said avenue to Victoria Park Avenue; thence northerly along said avenue to Highway No. 401; thence easterly along said highway to the point of commencement.

== History ==
=== 2018 boundary adjustment ===
Toronto municipal ward boundaries were significantly modified in 2018 during the election campaign. Ultimately the new ward structure was used and later upheld by the Supreme Court of Canada in 2021.

== Councillors ==
Council term	Member	
Council term	Scarborough Centre (Metro Council)	
1988–1991	Brian Harrison	
1991–1994	Brian Harrison	
1994–1997	Brian Harrison	
	Ward 15 Scarborough City Centre	
1997–2000	Lorenzo Berardinetti, Brad Duguid	
	Ward 37 Scarborough Centre	Ward 38 Scarborough Centre
2000–2003	Lorenzo Berardinetti	Brad Duguid
2003–2006	Michael Thompson	Glenn De Baermaeker
2006–2010	Michael Thompson	Glenn De Baermaeker
2010–2014	Michael Thompson	Glenn De Baermaeker
2014–2018	Michael Thompson	Glenn De Baermaeker
	Ward 21 Scarborough Centre	
2018–2022	Michael Thompson	
2022–2026	Michael Thompson	
2026–2030	Michael Thompson	

== Election results ==
2026 Toronto municipal election

Candidate	Votes	%	minus
Michael Thompson (X)	16,053	51.10	4.15 ▼
Krissan Veerasingam	4,653	14.81	–
Taiba Ahmed	2,003	6.38	–
Stella Kargiannakis	1,984	6.32	–
Uthish Ganesh	1,695	5.40	–
Akina Lalla	1,174	3.74	–
Willie Reodica	1,130	3.60	–
Bahareh Barahmand	1,015	3.23	–
Madura Shanmugaratnam	952	3.03	–
Nisha Kumari	504	1.60	–
Patience Evbagharu	251	0.80	–

2022 Toronto municipal election

Candidate	Vote	%
Michael Thompson	9,977	55.25
Muhammad Ayub	2,478	13.72
Paul Beatty	1,857	10.28
Kiri Vadivelu	1,800	9.97
Hansie Daniel	1,375	7.61
Luigi Lisciandro	570	3.16

2018 Toronto municipal election

Michael Thompson	16,542	69.05%
Paul Beatty	1,638	6.84%
Fawzi Bidawi	1,035	4.32%
Zia Choudhary	1,014	4.23%
Vivek Bhatt	993	4.15%
Randy Bucao	949	3.96%
Raphael Rosch	545	2.28%
Zamir ul-Hassan Nadeem	448	1.87%
Afran Naveed	349	1.46%
Ismail Khan	311	1.30%
Nur Saifullah	132	0.55%

== See also ==
- Municipal elections in Canada
- Municipal government of Toronto
- List of Toronto municipal elections
