= Vincent Ke =

Canadian politician

- 柯文彬
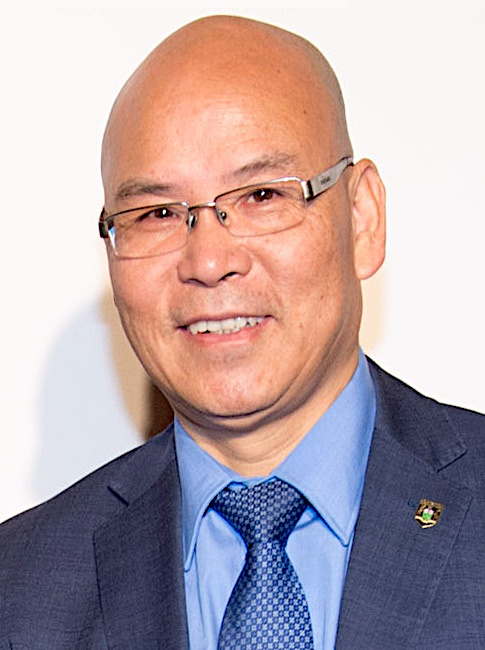
- Ke in 2019

Member of the Ontario Provincial Parliament for Don Valley North
- In office June 7, 2018 – January 28, 2025
- Preceded by: Riding established
- Succeeded by: Jonathan Tsao

Parliamentary Assistant to the Minister of Public and Business Service Delivery
- In office June 29, 2022 – March 10, 2023
- Minister: Kaleed Rasheed

Parliamentary Assistant to the Minister of Heritage, Sport, Tourism and Culture Industries (Culture and Sport) (Note: Known as Tourism, Culture and Sport before October 31, 2019.)
- In office June 26, 2019 – June 1, 2022
- Minister: Lisa MacLeod

Personal details
- Born: Quanzhou, Fujian, China
- Party: Independent
- Other political affiliations: Progressive Conservative (until 2023)
- Children: 1
- Education: Fuzhou University; Ruhr University Bochum
- Occupation: Politician
- Website: vincentkempp.com

Chinese name
- Chinese: 柯文彬
Transcriptions
Standard Mandarin
- Hanyu Pinyin: Kē Wénbīn
Yue: Cantonese
- Jyutping: O^{1} Man^{4}-ban^{1}

Wenbin "Vincent" Ke (Chinese: 柯文彬) is a Canadian politician who was a member of Provincial Parliament (MPP) in Ontario, representing the riding of Don Valley North from 2018 until 2025. Originally elected as a Progressive Conservative (PC), he stepped down from the caucus on March 10, 2023 following allegations of involvement in Chinese government election interference. He is the second mainland-Chinese Canadian immigrant elected as a PC MPP.

== Background ==
Ke was born in Quanzhou, Fujian, China, and immigrated to Canada in 1998. He holds an undergraduate degree in engineering from Fuzhou University in China and a Master's from Ruhr University in Germany. Prior to his election, Ke worked for Conec—a German firm which has sites in Shanghai and Brampton—from 1999 to 2018; his role with the company was as an electronic engineer. Ke is also registered as an insurance agent by the Financial Services Commission of Ontario.

Professional Engineers Ontario (PEO), the province's regulatory body for engineers, instructed Ke to stop using the title of engineer following complaints that he was doing so without being licensed as a professional engineer with PEO.

== Political career ==
Ke ran in the 2018 provincial election as a PC candidate, and defeated Liberal candidate Shelley Carroll to be elected MPP in Don Valley North. He was appointed as the parliamentary assistant to the minister of heritage, sport, tourism and culture industries (culture and sport) on June 26, 2019.

During the 2022 provincial election, Ke and seven other PC MPPs were identified as having received an allowance from their PC riding associations, with Ke expensing meals, entertainment, gas and parking. While allowed by provincial law, federal politicians are prohibited from doing the same, raising questions about aligning provincial and federal allowance rules. Ke defeated Liberal Jonathan Tsao to win a second term, and was appointed as the parliamentary assistant to the minister of public and business service delivery on June 29, 2022.

=== Allegations of Chinese government interference ===
Ke's ties to the Chinese consulate were questioned by National Post writer Tom Blackwell in a 2019 article. In particular, Blackwell reported that Ke maintained ties with groups linked to the Chinese Communist Party's United Front Work Department. Blackwell provided Ke's office with a list of questions about his connections to the Chinese government including the possibility he joined the Chinese Communist Party, his ties with the Chinese consulate and a 2013 trip to China for a government-run workshop. In response, Ke's office said that he was "honoured to be a part of Doug Ford’s government" and that he would focus on "ensuring a strong voice for the constituents of Don Valley North at Queen’s Park". Premier Doug Ford's office also provided a response, stating that "MPP Ke is an important part of the Progressive Conservative caucus and represents his constituents with their best interests in mind".

In a 2021 article, Blackwell criticized Ke for seeming "over-eager to defend China, rather than being too worried about anti-Chinese hate," after Ke and Scarborough—Agincourt MPP Aris Babikian spoke out about a sign at a Chinese physician's office describing COVID-19 as "Wuhan pneumonia" in Chinese.

On March 10, 2023, Global News reported that Ke served as a financial intermediary for the Chinese consulate as part of election interference efforts. Ke denied the allegations and resigned from the Ontario PC caucus on the same day, so that he would not be a "distraction to the government and take away from the good work Premier Ford is doing for the province of Ontario". Ford's office stated that "While the allegations against Mr. Ke are not proven, they are serious and deserve his full and undivided attention as he works to clear his name". Ford later said "I have confidence that his name will be cleared", and that he would welcome Ke back into caucus if that occurred.

The Canadian Security Intelligence Service (CSIS) had previously briefed Ford's chief of staff in November 2022 about Ke, which Ford described as sparse and "very secretive".

In April 2023, Ke said that he had served Global News with a libel notice concerning their reporting about him.

=== 2025 election ===
Ke was not readmitted to caucus and ran in the 2025 Ontario general election as an independent candidate, but was unsuccessful. Liberal Jonathan Tsao was elected with Ke placing third behind PC candidate Sue Liu; Ke's vote total was greater than Tsao's margin of victory over Liu.

== Electoral record ==
2025 Ontario general election: Don Valley North
Party	Candidate	Votes	%	±%
Liberal	Jonathan Tsao	13,375	43.77	+6.94
Progressive Conservative	Sue Liu	11,484	37.58	–9.82
Independent	Vincent Ke	3,005	9.83	–37.57
New Democratic	Ebrahim Astaraki	1,562	5.11	–4.76
Green	Andrew Armstrong	784	2.57	–1.15
New Blue	Annie Nolan	346	1.13	–1.04
Total valid votes		30,556	99.29	
Total rejected, unmarked and declined ballots		219	0.71	+0.13
Turnout		30,775	38.04	–2.72
Eligible voters		80,903		
Liberal gain from Progressive Conservative		Swing		▲8.38
Source: Elections Ontario

2022 Ontario general election: Don Valley North
Party	Candidate	Votes	%	±%	Expenditures
Progressive Conservative	Vincent Ke	15,041	47.41	+2.97	$61,647
Liberal	Jonathan Tsao	11,685	36.83	+5.91	$88,913
New Democratic	Ebrahim Astaraki	3,133	9.87	–11.00	$16,187
Green	Ostap Soroka	1,179	3.72	+1.16	$823
New Blue	Jay Sobel	690	2.17	–	$924
Total valid votes/expense limit		31,728	99.42	–	$109,620
Total rejected, unmarked and declined ballots		185	0.58	–0.40	
Turnout		31,913	40.76	–13.05	
Eligible voters		78,300			
Progressive Conservative hold		Swing		▼1.47	
Source: Elections Ontario

2018 Ontario general election: Don Valley North
Party	Candidate	Votes	%	±%
Progressive Conservative	Vincent Ke	18,046	44.44	+11.76
Liberal	Shelley Carroll	12,557	30.92	–21.68
New Democratic	Akil Sadikali	8,476	20.87	+9.92
Green	Janelle Yanishewski	1,039	2.56	–0.85
Libertarian	Sarah Matthews	287	0.71	–
None of the Above	Alexander Verstraten	202	0.50	–
Total valid votes		40,607	99.02	
Total rejected, unmarked and declined ballots		403	0.98	
Turnout		41,010	53.81	
Eligible voters		76,211		
Progressive Conservative notional gain from Liberal		Swing		+16.72
Source: Elections Ontario
