= Ron Moeser =

Canadian politician (1942–2017)

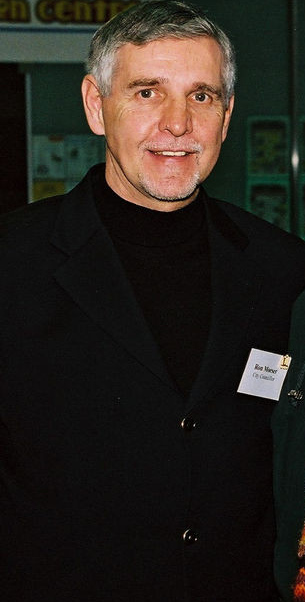

Toronto City Councillor for (Ward 44) Scarborough East
- In office December 1, 2006 – April 18, 2017
- Preceded by: Gay Cowbourne
- Succeeded by: Jim Hart
- In office December 1, 2000 – December 1, 2003
- Preceded by: Ward established
- Succeeded by: Gay Cowbourne

Toronto City Councillor for (Ward 16) Scarborough Highland Creek
- In office January 1, 1998 – December 1, 2000
- Preceded by: Ward established
- Succeeded by: Ward abolished

Chair of the Scarborough Community Council
- In office July 1, 2002 – December 1, 2003
- Preceded by: David Soknacki
- Succeeded by: Raymond Cho

Scarborough City Councillor for Ward 9
- In office December 1, 1988 – January 1, 1998
- Preceded by: John Mackie
- Succeeded by: Position abolished

Personal details
- Born: Ronald Moeser; October 15, 1942 Germany
- Died: April 18, 2017 (aged 74) Toronto, Ontario, Canada
- Resting place: Christ the King Cemetery, Markham, Ontario, Canada
- Spouse: Heather Moeser
- Children: 3

Ronald Moeser (October 15, 1942 – April 18, 2017) was a Canadian politician in Ontario, Canada. He was a city councillor for Ward 44 in Scarborough from 1988 to 1997 and then a councillor for the amalgamated city of Toronto from 1998 to 2003 and then 2006 until his death in 2017.

== Biography ==
Moeser was born in Germany and moved to Canada after the end of World War II, becoming a citizen by the mid-1950s. He moved to West Rouge area of Scarborough in 1981. He was a longtime marathon runner in his youth.

Moeser was elected to what was then the Scarborough City Council in 1988 representing the West Rouge community. He sat on Scarborough City Council for nine years and chaired the Waterfront committee. Moeser and his wife Heather played an active role in the preservation of the Rouge Valley. By working with community associations, they helped create Community Associations in Scarborough that helped pave the way for development of Rouge National Urban Park.

Following the amalgamation of Scarborough into the new City of Toronto in 1997, Moeser was elected a Toronto City Councillor and became chair of the Scarborough Community Council. He was defeated in the 2003 municipal election by Gay Cowbourne but returned to office in the 2006 vote when Cowbourne retired, and defeated Diana Hall by 61 votes. In his last term Moeser served as vice-chair of the Scarborough Community Council.

He was diagnosed with lymphoma in 2016 and died on April 18, 2017, aged 74. He is buried in Christ the King Cemetery in Markham, Ontario.

Toronto City Council paid tribute to Councillor Moeser in a meeting on April 26, 2017. In June 2017, Jim Hart, a former assistant to Councillor Moeser, was appointed as councillor for Ward 44 by City Council instead of calling a by-election. Hart stated that he hopes to carry on Moeser's record on the "environment and natural green spaces" and "when you look at the ward, the ward is a beautiful ward, there are great parks, great forestry and the Scarborough Waterfront Trial – Ron started that off".

== Election results ==
2014 Toronto election, Ward 44
Candidate	Votes	%
Ron Moeser	6,416	25.73%
Jennifer McKelvie	5,844	23.44%
Diana Hall	5,530	22.18%
Amarjeet Chhabra	2,852	11.44%
Total	24,934	100%

2010 Toronto election, Ward 44
Candidate	Votes	%
Ron Moeser	10,185	47.45%
Diana Hall	9,901	46.13%
Mohammed Mirza	749	3.49%
Heath Thomas	627	2.921%
Total	21,462	100%
