= Jim Hart (Ontario politician) =

Canadian politician and civil servant

Chair of the Toronto Police Services Board
- In office October 22, 2019 – November 19, 2022
- Preceded by: Andy Pringle
- Succeeded by: Ann Morgan

Toronto City Councillor for Ward 44 Scarborough East
- In office June 28, 2017 – December 1, 2018
- Preceded by: Ron Moeser
- Succeeded by: Ward Abolished

Personal details
- Occupation: Public servant

Jim Hart is a Canadian politician and retired public servant who is the current chair of the Toronto Police Services Board since October 22, 2019. Hart served as a Toronto city councillor from 2017 to 2018, representing Ward 44 Scarborough East, and was a former general manager of Toronto Parks, Forestry & Recreation.

== Career ==
=== City of Toronto ===
Hart is a former general manager of the Toronto Parks, Forestry and Recreation Division and served in Councillor Ron Moeser's office as an assistant. He retired in 2014 after working in the Toronto government for 31 years.

=== Politics ===
Hart was appointed to the Toronto City Council in a 27 to 44 vote, beating former mayoral candidate David Soknacki following the death in office of Ron Moeser. He was endorsed via a letter to council by Moeser's widow, Heather.

Hart stated during his speech to council that if appointed, he will not seek re-election in the 2018 Toronto election.

==== Toronto Police Services Board ====
As councillor, Hart served as vice-chair of the Toronto Police Services Board.

As of September 30, 2019, Hart was appointed to the Toronto Police Services Board for a three-year term. On October 22, 2019, he was elected interim chair.
