= Toronto Police Service Board =

Civilian police board governing the Toronto Police Service

- Abbreviation: TPSB
- Predecessor: Metropolitan Toronto Police Service Board
- Formation: January 1, 1998; 28 years ago
- Type: Police board
- Headquarters: 40 College Street; Toronto, Ontario
- Chair: Shelley Carroll
- Budget: CA$1.076 billion (approved police operating budget, 2020)
- Staff: Toronto Police Service
- Website: www.tpsb.ca

The Toronto Police Service Board (TPSB) is the civilian police board that governs the Toronto Police Service (TPS). The board is responsible for approving the annual police budget, defining objectives and policies for TPS, and hiring Toronto's police chief.

The role of police service boards are outlined in sections 37-39 of the provincial Community Safety and Policing Act. The board makes decisions governing the structure and environment of the police service, but the chief of police leads the day-to-day operation of the police. Neither the board or its members can direct members of the police service. Only the chief of police, who is responsible to the board as a whole, receives direction on objectives, policies and priorities.

Membership of the board includes the mayor of Toronto (or a designate), two city councillors, one civilian member appointed by city council and three civilian members appointed by the province.

The board is administrative in nature and it does not investigate police conduct or complaints, as is the mandate of the Special Investigations Unit, Ontario Civilian Police Commission or Office of the Independent Police Review Director, which are oversight agencies.

== Membership ==
The board comprises seven members, three appointed by the Province of Ontario and four by the City of Toronto. Three civilian members are appointed by the province and one by the city; two city councillors and the mayor of Toronto as the head of council sit on the board. A chair (presently Ann Morgan) and vice-chair are elected from its membership. The Community Safety and Policing Act requires the board to meet at least four times a year.

The Community Safety and Policing Act also stipulates that a judge, justice of the peace, police officer, or a person who practices criminal law as a defence counsel may not be a member of a police board.

Since January 14, 2025, membership is as follows:

Name	Type	Appointed by	Joined board
Shelley Carroll	Chair	Toronto City Council	April 17, 2024
Chris Brillinger	Vice-chair	Toronto City Council	June 27, 2024
Ann Morgan	Member	Province	March 27, 2021
Lisa Kostakis	Member	Province	July 25, 2020
Lily Cheng	Councillor	Toronto City Council	November 23, 2022
Nicola (Nick) Migliore	Member	Province	May 18, 2023
Amber Morley	Councillor	Toronto City Council	August 10, 2023

== History ==
Prior to amalgamation, the Metropolitan Toronto Police were governed by the Metropolitan Toronto Police Services Board from 1990 until 1998. Previously, it was called the Metropolitan Toronto Police Commission (or Board of Police Commission) from 1955 until 1990, when the name of the board was changed as a result of amendments to the Police Services Act.

=== Chairs ===
Body	Chair	Tenure
Metropolitan Toronto Police Commission	Charles O. Bick	1956–1977
Metropolitan Toronto Police Commission	Philip Givens	1977–1985
Metropolitan Toronto Police Commission	Clare Westcott	1985–1988
Metropolitan Toronto Police Commission	June Rowlands	1989–1990
Metropolitan Toronto Police Services Board	June Rowlands	1990-1991
Metropolitan Toronto Police Services Board	Susan Eng	1991–1995
Metropolitan Toronto Police Services Board	Maureen Prinsloo	1995–1998
Toronto Police Services Board	Norm Gardner	1998–2004
Toronto Police Services Board	Alan Heisey	2004
Toronto Police Services Board	Pam McConnell	2004–2005
Toronto Police Services Board	Alok Mukherjee	2005 – July 31, 2015
Toronto Police Services Board	Andrew Pringle	2015–2019
Toronto Police Services Board	Jim Hart	2019–2023
Toronto Police Services Board	Ann Morgan	2023–2025
Toronto Police Services Board	Shelley Carroll	2025–Present
Source: Toronto Police Services Board

== See also ==
- Ministry of the Solicitor General
- Ministry of the Attorney General
- Toronto City Council
