= Alok Mukherjee =

Canadian academic, human rights advocate, and public servant

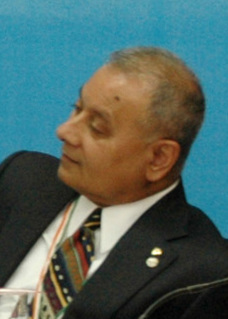
- Mukherjee in 2007
- Born: 1945 (age 80–81); Kanpur, British India
- Occupations: Distinguished Visiting Professor, Toronto Metropolitan University; Toronto Police Services Board Chair (retired)

Alok Mukherjee (born circa 1945), born in Kanpur, India, is a Canadian academic, human rights advocate, and public servant. He served as chair of the Toronto Police Services Board (TPSB) from 2005 until his July 2015 retirement. He is currently appointed "distinguished visiting professor" at Toronto Metropolitan University. On March 24, 2018, Mukherjee, co-authored with Tim Harper, published Excessive Force, a book about the present and future of policing in Canada. On September 8, 2019 he was selected as the NDP candidate for the riding Toronto – St. Paul's in the 2019 Canadian federal electionAlok is fondly remembered by alumnus (of 1968-71 batch) of Shriram College of Commerce (SRCC) Delhi University. He was a lecturer of English Language and joined SRCC after doing a masters from Sagar University of Madhya Pradesh (now known as Dr. Hari Singh Gour University).

== Background ==
In 1971, Mukherjee emigrated to Canada from India intending to pursue an academic career. He was sidetracked from this goal for several years when he assumed a position as a School Community Relations Worker with the (then) Toronto Board of Education, from which he went on to become the Toronto Board's Race Relations Advisor.

Following his stint at the Toronto Board of Education, Mukherjee became an instructor in South Asian Studies at York University — and where, in 2004, he received a PhD. During this period, he designed and taught some courses in South Asian cultures, languages and literature as well as in Native Canadian literature. He published two books – Towards an Aesthetic of Dalit Literature, which is a translation of a work on the literature of India's "untouchable" writers by the Dalit writer Sharankumar Limbale, and This Gift of English which proposes a new analysis of the rise of English education in India as a convergence of British and Indian ruling class interests. He also served as an advisor to Mayor David Miller.

Since his arrival in 1971, Mukherjee has worked as a human rights and equity advocate, community organizer and race relations consultant in Canada and abroad. He has been a partner with the consulting firm Partners in Equality, and was a member of the Doris Marshall Institute for Education and Action.

Mukherjee was the Acting Chief Commissioner and Vice Chair of the Ontario Human Rights Commission. He was also a member of the Ontario Civilian Commission on Police Services and has served on the Board of Governors of Centennial College.

== Police Services Board ==
Mukherjee was originally appointed by City Council to the Toronto Police Services Board for a term effective September 28, 2004 to November 30, 2006. In 2004, he became Vice-Chair of the Board and in 2005 became Chair, succeeding Pam McConnell. After his original appointment, he was reappointed for the following term February 8, 2007 to April 13, 2010. Subsequently, he was appointed by the Province for the next three (3) year term and on its completion, he was re-appointed for another three-year term effective April 14, 2013.

With this record of service, Mukherjee has become the second longest-serving board chair of this institution. Only Charles O. Bick, the first chairman of what was then called the Metropolitan Toronto Police Commission, had served for a longer period of time with a tenure of twenty-two (22) years. On January 21, 2015, Mukherjee was re-elected as board chair by a 6 to 1 margin, to a tenth one-year term. In January 2015 Mukherjee indicated he did not intend to seek further re-appointment to the board, and at the June 18, 2015 monthly public meeting, he announced his retirement from the board, effective July 31, 2015, in order to accept an appointment at Ryerson University (now Toronto Metropolitan University) (now Toronto Metropolitan University).

At the federal level, Mukherjee currently serves as President of the Canadian Association of Police Boards (CAPB).

== Toronto Metropolitan University ==
Mukherjee was appointed to assist the Office of the Assistant Vice-President/Vice-Provost, Equity, Diversity and Inclusion at Toronto Metropolitan University and the Faculty of Arts' Department of Criminology.

== Book ==
Mukherjee co-authored Excessive Force: Toronto's Fight to Reform City Policing with Tim Harper. It was published March 24, 2018 through Douglas & McIntyre. It is about the present and future of policing in Canada. Mukherjee recounts his time as the chair of the TPSB and reveals how the Toronto Police Service acted internally during controversial events & practices such as the 2010 G20, the death of Sammy Yatim, and "carding". In an excerpt from the book Mukherjee reveals the policing during the G20, "left a permanent emotional scar."

== Electoral record ==
2019 Canadian federal election: Toronto—St. Paul's
Party	Candidate	Votes	%	±%	Expenditures
Liberal	Carolyn Bennett	32,494	54.31	-0.95	$88,263.67
Conservative	Jae Truesdell	12,933	21.61	-5.37	$95,161.27
New Democratic	Alok Mukherjee	9,442	15.78	+1.06	$48,947.09
Green	Sarah Climenhaga	4,042	6.76	+3.72	$447.10
People's	John Kellen	923	1.54	-	$0.00
Total valid votes/expense limit		59,834	99.04		
Total rejected ballots		384	0.64	+0.20	
Turnout		60,218	70.39	-2.15	
Eligible voters		85,544			
Liberal hold		Swing		+2.21	
Source: Elections Canada

Preceded by Pam McConnell; 2004 – 2005	Chair of the Toronto Police Services Board; 2005 – July 2015	Succeeded by Andy Pringle; 2015 – present
