= David Soknacki =

Canadian politician

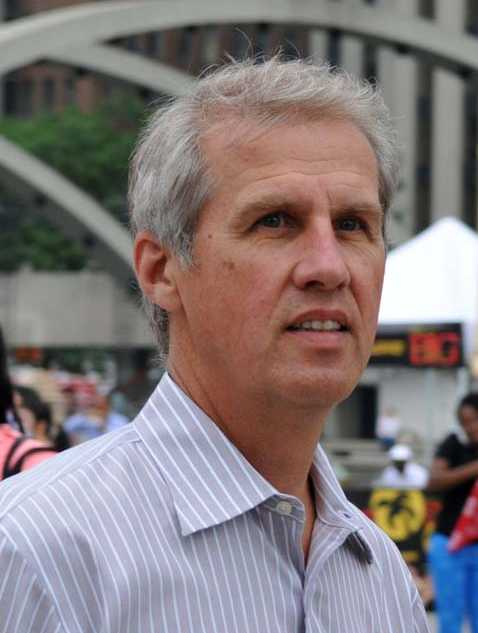
- David Soknacki in 2014

Toronto City Councillor for (Ward 43) Scarborough East
- In office September 23, 1999 – November 30, 2006
- Preceded by: Frank Faubert
- Succeeded by: Paul Ainslie

Chair of the Budget Committee
- In office December 1, 2003 – November 30, 2006
- Preceded by: David Shiner
- Succeeded by: Shelley Carroll

Scarborough City Councillor for Ward 8
- In office December 1, 1994 – December 31, 1997
- Preceded by: Frank Faubert
- Succeeded by: Position abolished

Personal details
- Born: September 9, 1954 (age 71) Scarborough, Ontario, Canada
- Spouse: Florence
- Children: 1
- Occupation: Business owner

David Soknacki (born September 9, 1954) is a Canadian municipal politician in Toronto, Ontario. He was a councillor in Scarborough from 1994 to 1997 and then served as a Toronto City Councillor from 1999 to 2006 representing Ward 43 in the western half of the Scarborough East riding. He was a candidate for Mayor of Toronto in the 2014 election.

== Background ==
Soknacki graduated from the University of Toronto with a Bachelor of Commerce degree in 1976. In 1978, he received his MBA degree from the University of Western Ontario.

He moved to eastern Scarborough in 1963, and founded the Densgrove Park Community Association.

== Politics ==
He ran for Scarborough city council in 1991, but lost to Frank Faubert. When Faubert ran for the mayor's job in 1994, Soknacki tried for the seat again. This time he was successful, defeating Glenn De Baeremaeker and Zephine Wailoo.

When Scarborough was amalgamated with the City of Toronto and four other municipalities in 1997, Soknacki ran for a seat on the new Toronto city council, but came in third, losing to Faubert and Ron Moeser. In June 1999, Faubert died of cancer and a by-election was called to replace him. Soknacki won by a considerable margin in a field of seven candidates.

During his first term on city council, one of his accomplishments was the creation of a position of poet laureate for the city. He was seen as a centre-right member of city council, but also had links to the left. Unusually for a conservative, he was endorsed by the left-leaning NOW magazine in the 2003 municipal election, and was appointed to the important position of budget chief by mayor David Miller in 2003, despite Soknacki's support for Miller's rival John Tory in the mayoral election.

In his second term on council, Soknacki served as the Chair of the Budget Committee, a position often referred to as the 'budget chief'. During this term he continued to write a column on municipal politics for the Scarborough Mirror.

On August 22, 2006, Soknacki announced that he was retiring from politics. He gave no reasons for leaving city council but said he was returning to run his spice importing business. He gave his retirement date as the end of the council term on November 30, 2006.

On June 4, 2007, Soknacki was appointed Chairperson of the federal Crown Corporation Parc Downsview Park Inc for a five year term. The major objective of the term was to develop and obtain agreement from all levels of government for a financially self-sustaining park. Not without controversy, Toronto Council, local community associations and other levels of government approved the Downsview Area Secondary Plan in 2012.

One of the themes of Soknacki’s 2014 candidacy for mayor was the reform of the Toronto Police Service. On February 16, 2016, Soknacki was appointed to the Toronto Police Transformation Task Force, which issued its Final Report on January 26, 2017.

== 2014 mayoral campaign ==
On September 30, 2013, he announced that he would run for Mayor of Toronto as a fiscal conservative against incumbent mayor Rob Ford. He registered on January 6, 2014.

Soknacki positioned himself as a centre-right candidate, but unlike the right-wing incumbent mayor Rob Ford, Soknacki promised to replace the Scarborough RT with light rail transit rather than the proposed subway. Soknacki had been treated as a mainstream candidate by the media, despite early polls consistently showing he was last among the five major contenders. A Forum Poll conducted in June showed Soknacki at 8% support, ahead of rival Karen Stintz putting him in fourth place among the top five mayoral contenders.

After polling in single digits since the official start of his campaign, he announced on September 9, 2014, that he was withdrawing his candidacy.

In 2017, Soknacki was one of the applicants for appointment to city council to succeed the late Ron Moeser in Ward 44. Jim Hart was later appointed to fill the vacancy and ward was abolished in 2018.
