= Gay Cowbourne =

Canadian politician

Toronto City Councillor for Ward 44 Scarborough East
- In office December 1, 2003 – November 30, 2006
- Preceded by: Ron Moeser
- Succeeded by: Ron Moeser

Personal details
- Born: Liverpool, England
- Occupation: Teacher

Gay Cowbourne is a former Canadian politician, who served on Toronto City Council, representing one of the two Scarborough East wards, between 2003 and 2006.

Originally from Liverpool, England, she moved to Canada in 1976 when her husband, an electrical engineer, got a job with Ontario Hydro. A teacher by training, she became an adult literacy instructor and community activist, and the president of the Centennial Community and Recreation Association. In the 2003 municipal election, Cowbourne successfully challenged Ron Moeser, who had represented the ward for fifteen years.

During her term, she chaired the mayor's Roundtable on Seniors. She also chaired the city's Language Equity and Literacy Working Group.

She chose not to run for re-election in 2006 and Moeser won the seat again.
