= 2003 Toronto municipal election =

2003 municipal election in Toronto, Ontario, Canada

2003 Toronto mayoral election
- 10 November 2003
- Turnout: 38.3% (▲2.2 pp)
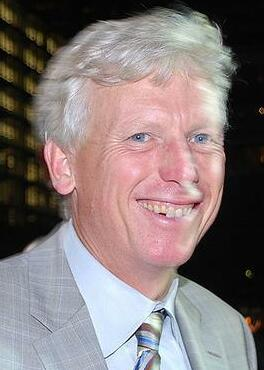

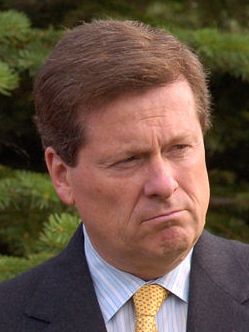

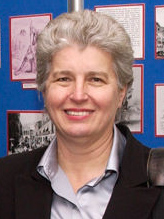

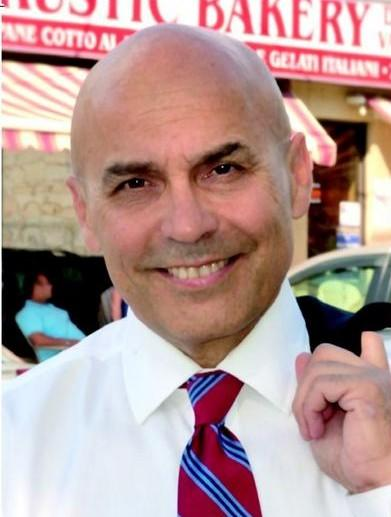
Candidate	David Miller	John Tory
Popular vote	299,385	263,189
Percentage	43.3%	38.0%
Candidate	Barbara Hall	John Nunziata
Popular vote	63,751	36,021
Percentage	9.2%	5.2%
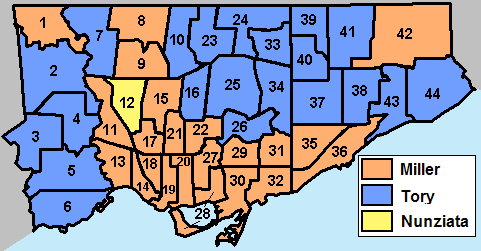
Mayor before election
Mel Lastman
Elected mayor
David Miller

Municipal elections were held on 10 November 2003, in Toronto, Ontario, Canada, to elect the Mayor of Toronto, 44 city councillors, and school board trustees. The mayor and city councillors were elected through first-past-the-post voting.

David Miller was elected mayor (Results of 2003 Toronto election).

Most municipalities in the Province of Ontario held elections on this date. See also 2003 Ontario municipal elections.

== Mayoral election ==
Incumbent Toronto mayor Mel Lastman chose not to run for re-election. A large number of candidates ran for the position of mayor, but five main candidates emerged.

- Barbara Hall is the former mayor of pre-amalgamation Toronto and an independent who was formerly a member of the New Democratic Party and who had the support of many of the city's Liberals. She campaigned on a moderate policy of outreach to minorities and her connections to the provincial Liberal government which would enable a "new deal" for Toronto.
- John Nunziata, a former Member of Parliament for the Liberal Party of Canada, was expelled from the party because of his opposition to his party's continuation of the GST, something that the party had promised to abolish as part of its election platform. He ran a right-wing campaign for mayor of Toronto, advocating stiff penalties against the homeless and a strong focus on law and order.
- John Tory, who had just resigned as President and CEO of Rogers Cable. A supporter of the Ontario Progressive Conservative Party, he had served as Principal Secretary to Premier Bill Davis, and campaign co-chair of Mel Lastman's 1998 and 2000 mayoral runs. Tory ran a centre-right campaign promising to hire more police, fine panhandlers, and incinerate Toronto's garbage. He also promised rigorous fiscal discipline at city hall.
- David Miller, the most left wing of the major candidates, is closely associated with unions and the New Democratic Party. He had long served as a city councillor. His main cause was halting the expansion of the Toronto Island Airport.
- Tom Jakobek, the former Budget Chief, gathered much media attention at the start and participated in various debates with the other candidates. He was quickly distanced from the front-runner race when the vote neared, as his campaign was hampered by recent municipal mismanagement, and admissions that he had lied about accepting gifts from lobbyists.

The campaign began with Barbara Hall far in the lead. She had wide name recognition and attracted moderate support from across Toronto. She also had close links with the newly elected Liberal government of Dalton McGuinty. John Nunziata was in a distant second, polling around 9% at the best, due to his past experience as a federal MP. John Tory and David Miller were closely tied for an even more distant third.

Around September, Hall began to lose support when it became apparent that she lacked a campaign message, sticking mainly to her "love for Toronto" and arguing that she could get a "new deal" with the provincial Liberals. Miller was attacked by all candidates for musing about tolls on roads leading into Toronto, but he dropped the proposal before it could do much harm. Miller's next message about banning the island airport bridge distinguished himself from the other candidates and he eventually vaulted into first place, to the surprise of many. Tory's support also began to grow steadily as Hall's eroded and he moved into a close second. At one point, Hall, Tory, and Miller each polled similar numbers, making it a three-way contest. As Hall's support dropped, the race had become essentially a two-way contest between Tory and Miller. As the race narrowed to a close, the two front-runners ran a respectful campaign without many negative partisan attacks. Tory was applauded when he appeared at Miller's rally to congratulate the latter's victory.

John Nunziata, long not considered a contender, dropped a bombshell on the media when it he announced that members of a rival camp offered him $150,000 and the Deputy Mayor's position to drop out of the race. Nunziata refused to release specifics, although the media speculated that it was Tory's campaign, which was subsequently cleared by the police investigation. Tory in fact received a boost in the polls for his promise to drop out of the election if any wrong-doing had been discovered, while Nunziata was accused of mischief and smearing his opponent with unsubstantiated claim. As the campaign continued, Nunziata's reputation also suffered when he was alleged to have bullied councillors who withdrew their support from him. He was also dogged by his "flip-flopping" on controversial positions that he had taken as a federal MP, such as denying his private member's bill to ban abortion. Nunziata garnered only 5% of the vote and analysts believed that he had also damaged his credibility and future political prospects.

Despite this being his first election as a candidate, John Tory was credited with running a respectable campaign which provided wide recognition. He later became leader of the Ontario PC Party (2004–09), and in a return to municipal politics became Mayor of Toronto in 2014.

Although it was known from the start that Tom Jakobek did not stand a chance of winning, he still continued in the election.

On 17 July 2006, The Toronto Star reported that there were more than 300,000 people on the voting list who may – or may not – have been legally allowed to vote. Since Miller beat Tory by only 36,000 votes, with the results it would only take a small portion of the unconfirmed list to affect an election outcome. Toronto Star article

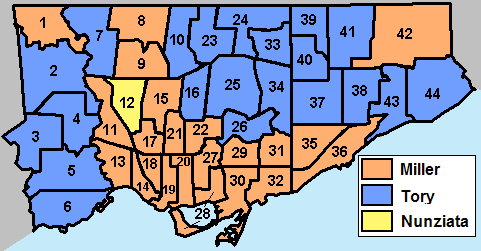
Mayoral results by ward

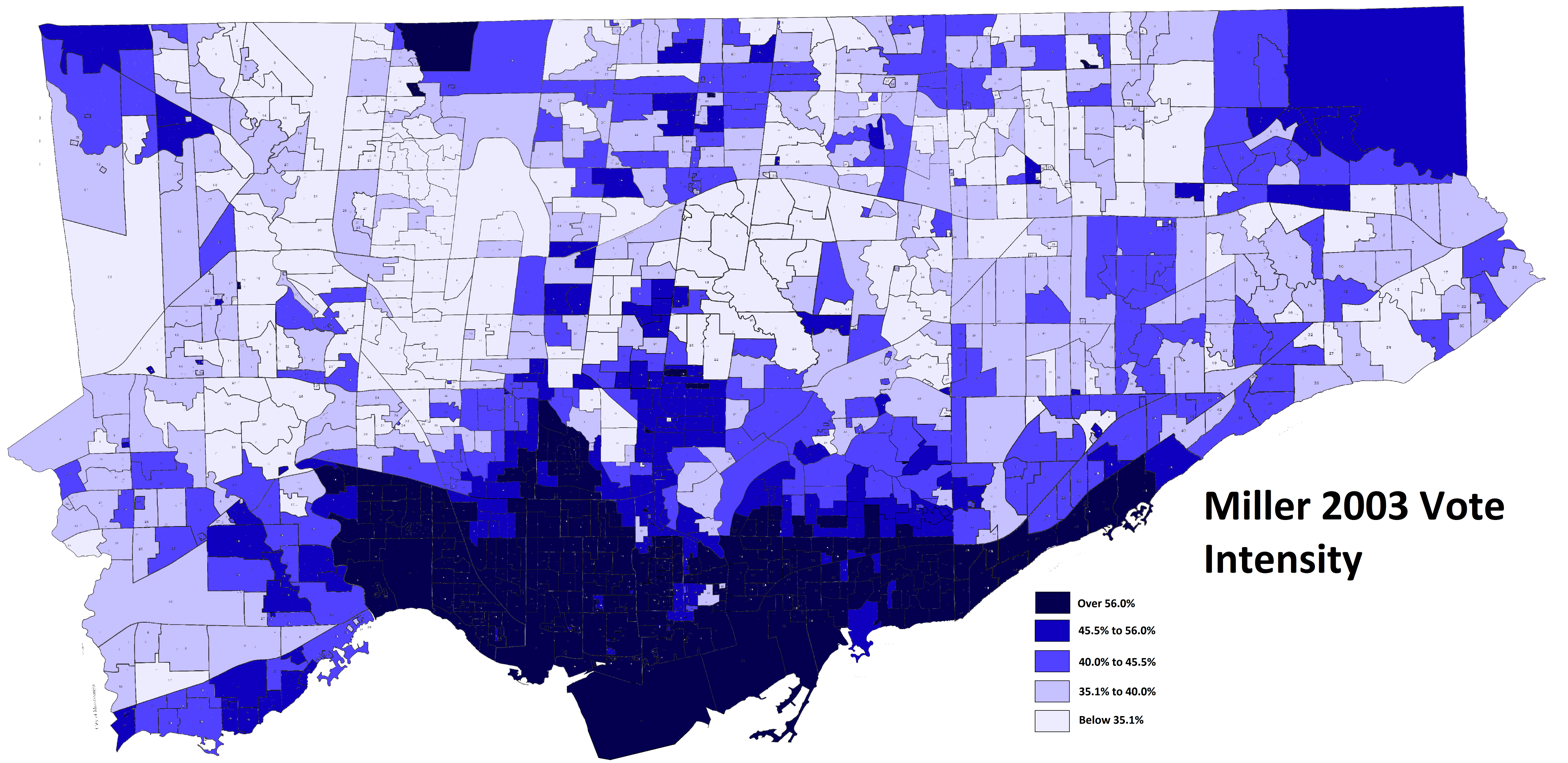
Miller's vote by poll

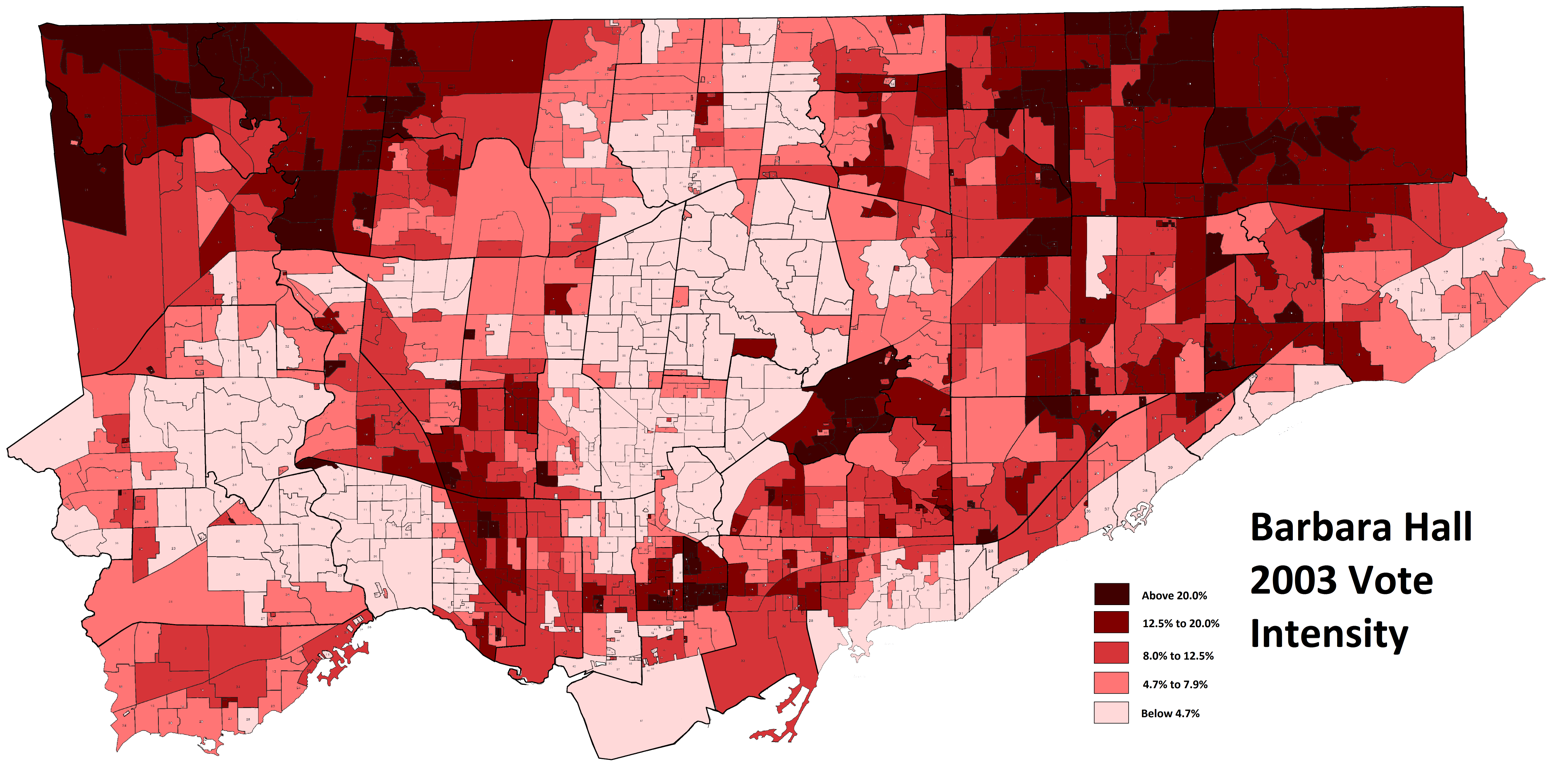
Barbara Hall's vote by poll

=== Results ===
2003 Toronto municipal election, Mayor of Toronto
Candidate	Total votes	% of total votes
David Miller	299,385	43.26
John Tory	263,189	38.03
Barbara Hall	63,751	9.21
John Nunziata	36,021	5.20
Tom Jakobek	5,277	0.76
Douglas Campbell	2,197	0.32
Ahmad Shehab	2,084	0.30
Jaime Castillo	1,616	0.23
Luis Silva	1,305	0.19
Don Andrews	1,220	0.18
Timothy McAuliffe	821	0.12
Kevin Mark Clarke	804	0.12
John Hartnett	803	0.12
Gary Benner	802	0.12
Albert Howell	717	0.10
John Jahshan	703	0.10
Michael Brausewetter	672	0.10
David Lichacz	659	0.10
Ram Narula	645	0.09
Elias Makhoul	644	0.09
Daniel Poremski	627	0.09
Ronald Graham	619	0.09
Fen Peters	598	0.09
Duri Naimji	569	0.08
Scott Yee	551	0.08
Monowar Hossain	537	0.08
Axcel Cocon	498	0.07
Ben Kerr	433	0.06
Aleksandar Glisic	420	0.06
Mitch L. Gold	412	0.06
Hashmat Safi	383	0.06
Simon Shaw	376	0.05
Patricia O'Beirne	358	0.05
Abel van Wyk	332	0.05
Benjamin Mbaegbu	288	0.04
Gerald Derome	278	0.04
Paul Lewin	271	0.04
Rabindra Prashad	271	0.04
Hardy Dhir	199	0.03
Kendal Csak	193	0.03
Mehmet Yagiz	193	0.03
Richard Weston	133	0.02
Ratan Wadhwa	121	0.02
Barry Pletch	110	0.02
Totals	692,085	100%

== Information on minor candidates ==
- Luis A. da Silva is a banker, and was 33 years old in 2003. He was elected to the Metro Toronto Separate School Board in 1994, winning in the old City of Toronto's fourth division. He lost his bid for re-election in 1997, and was again defeated in 2000. Silva later served on the Mayor's Task Force on Drugs, and described himself in campaign literature as "The man with the plan". He supported subway expansion, and argued that the federal government had no right to collect the Goods and Services Tax in Toronto. He called for the number of city councillors to be cut in half, and said that he would require candidates for public office to pass a test on the workings of municipal government. He also supported the creation of an "Order of Toronto" to honour prominent citizens. Less seriously, he called for the Toronto Maple Leafs to retire Frank Mahovlich's jersey. Silva acknowledged that he could not win, and aimed for a fifth-place finish. He received a Master's Degree in Public Administration from the University of Western Ontario after the election, writing on the new City of Toronto Act passed by the provincial government of Dalton McGuinty.
- Timothy McAullife was a 28-year-old freelance writer. He supported skateboarding at the Eaton Centre and wanted to eliminate Toronto Transit Commission transfers.
- John Hartnett was a 28-year-old student and bartender, and a third-generation Canadian. He said that he wanted to represent the "XYZ generation", and bring more young voters to the polls.
- Gary Benner was a 51-year-old retired civil engineer. He complained that rival candidate John Nunziata was in contravention of municipal campaign laws after he put advertisements in the Toronto subway system. Benner later accused all four major candidates of being in technical contravention of the elections laws, by virtue of having signs displayed in their campaign office windows. He indicated that he would ban election signs if he became mayor. He supported the construction of 60 kilometres of new subway lines over 20 years, and opposed expansion of the Toronto Island airport.
- John Jahshan is originally from Kitchener, and was 35 years old in 2003. He was general manager of the Sports Centre Cafe in the 1990s, and later operated the Bliss Niteclub & Lounge. He pledged support for after-school programs and inexpensive day-care, and claimed the five major candidates were afraid to debate him. Twenty of his supporters picketed the first major-candidates' debate with signs depicting the frontrunners as chickens. Jahshan went into hiding three days before the election, and was later arrested on charges of misappropriating funds intended for a wheelchair elevator at Driftwood Public School in the Jane and Finch area. In 2004 Jahshan plead guilty to fraud and was sentenced to 6 months in jail. After his release from jail he left Ontario and has faced new accusations in the Maritimes and later Alberta.
- Michael Brausewetter is a truck driver and former security guard, who once spent sixteen months in a coma after a car accident. A former homeless person, he recommended turning Princess Margaret Hospital into a homeless shelter. He also proposed moving the Toronto Island airport to the Leslie Street Spit. He is running for a council seat in the 2006 municipal election.
- David Lichacz has a degree from York University. He was 34 years old in 2003, and worked as a city greenskeeper. His campaign focused on public transit and accountability, and he indicated that he would cut the mayor's stipend if elected. As of 2006, he is a supervisor at Dentonia.
- Ram Narula was a 67-year-old retired teacher, who moved to Canada from India. He said could cure "arthritis, allergies, high blood pressure, stress, weight problems, prostrate (sic) and many others naturally", and would cause "perfect health" to radiate from city hall. He also indicated that he would reduce tuition fees by 75%, and solve homelessness within three months.
- Elias Makhoul was born in southern Lebanon, and moved to Canada at age 21. He runs a falafel restaurant in downtown Toronto called Mystic Muffin, and was known for giving interviews about his candidacy while serving customers. He argued that each of Toronto's subway stops should be turned into a cultural pavilion representing a different nation, to highlight the city's multicultural nature. He was 37 years old in 2003.
- Daniel Poremski was a 19-year-old psychology student at York University, and was the youngest candidate in the contest. He entered the mayoral race to find out more about municipal government. A newspaper quotes him as saying of his candidacy, "I want to learn more about the city and see what the people in Toronto ask of their politicians. It seemed like an interesting thing to do." He wanted to introduce environmentally friendly garbage incineration.
- Ronald Graham was listed as an Elvis impersonator and interior designer. He pledged to clean up garbage and pollution in the Beaches area of Toronto, and institute a zero-tolerance policy on racism and anti-Semitism.
- Fen Peters was born in Trinidad. He was a 58-year-old communications publicist with Bell Canada, and favoured the creation of local community councils.
- Aleksandar Glisic was born and raised in Yugoslavia, where he earned a Mechanical Engineering degree. He came to Canada in 1967, worked ten years for Ontario Hydro as a mechanical engineer, and spent another decade as a taxi driver. In 1982, he became the first resident of Ontario to sue for wrongful dismissal under the Discriminatory Business Practices Act, arguing that he was dismissed from Ontario Hydro without due cause. He supported Barbara Hall in mayoral elections before 2003, and says that he chose to run for office after being told that he could not work on her campaign. A colourful figure, he described himself as "Aleksandar the Great", "a sexy 66-year-old teenager" and "an Iceberg Man with a full-blooded loving heart for all people in Mega T.O., especially for the underdogs". His slogans included "Vote Aleksandar the Ex-Terminator for Mayor" and "sex shall save Serbia".
- Hashmat Safi was a 29-year-old medical doctor, originally from Afghanistan. He sought improve public transit and government accessibility. Late in the campaign, he announced that he would support Barbara Hall.
- Simon Shaw was a 31-year-old computer hardware specialist, with a degree in Computer Science from the University of Western Ontario. His primary issue was targeting child sexual predators, and advocating life sentences for people who commit crimes against women and children. He also promoted a subway stop and casino on Toronto Centre Island, and championed campaign finance reform. He applied for an appointment to Toronto City Council's 30th ward in 2003, following the election of Olivia Chow to the House of Commons of Canada. The position was filled by a vote of other councillors. Shaw did not receive any votes.
- Patricia O'Beirne was the candidate of the Communist League. She supported a thirty-hour work week, the withdrawal of Canadian troops from Afghanistan, and an end of the deportation of immigrants and refugees. A member of the Union of Needletrades, Industrial and Textile Employees in Toronto, she was formerly a member of Lodge 205 of the Communications, Energy and Paperworkers Union at Domtar in Montreal, Quebec. She has written for The Militant, the Communist League's newspaper.
- Abel van Wyk was born in the Netherlands, moved to Canada in 1957, and was an employee of Metro Works for 24 years. He is a frequent candidate for public office, having campaigned for Mayor of Scarborough in 1985, 1988, 1991 and 1994, and for Mayor of Toronto in 2000 and 2003. He supported an Ellesmere Road extension during the mid-1980s. His primary campaign issue in every election he has contested has been his plan for a waterfront causeway, a highway across Lake Ontario linking Highway 427 in Etobicoke to Highway 401 in Scarborough. Van Wyk argues that this link will save the city money and reduce pollution by 50%. He also called for a ban on donations to municipal candidates and a reduction in the work week during the 1988 campaign. In 1991, he said that affordable housing should be constructed through the private sector. He was 80 years old in 2003. He considered running for mayor in 2006, but ultimately declined.
- Benjamin Mbaegbu was a 35-year-old paralegal and former correctional officer. He previously ran for Toronto's 31st council seat in a 2001 by-election. In early 2003, he unsuccessfully sought one million dollars in compensation from the Solicitor General of Canada concerning the termination of his employment at Kingston Penitentiary in 1998. During the campaign, he said that he could bring a major sporting event to the city in four years.
- Paul Lewin is a criminal lawyer who had previously campaigned for the Marijuana Party of Canada in the 2000 federal election. He argued in that election that cannabis-related charges were contributing to Canada's over-burdened court system, and said that officials "do not believe this mild intoxicant is a high priority". He supported Canada's decision to legalize medicinal marijuana in 2001, but added that the changes did not go far enough. His campaign slogan in 2003 was "Free 416", referring to Toronto's area code.
- Rabindra Prashad is an artist, chef, and community organizer. He was born in Guyana, and moved to Toronto from Quebec at age 24. He addressed the crowd in French at one all-candidates meeting, saying that his years in Quebec had shown him the value of that province to the country. He also called for an east–west thoroughfare for bikes on Queen Street. He was 35 years old during the election.
- Hardial (Hardy) Dhir was a 65-year-old architect with a degree from the University of Toronto. He is the founder of the Bloor/Indian Grove Ratepayers and Tenants Association, and builds temples and synagogues in his private life. He previously ran for Mayor of Toronto in 1978, and for North York City Council in 1985 (appearing on the ballot as "Harry Dhir" on the latter occasion). In 2003, he called for property taxes to halved by forcing the provincial government to pay education taxes, and supported the introduction of Neighbourhood Watch "street captains" to prevent crime.
- Kendal Csak was a 30-year-old motivational speaker, and the owner of CG Consulting. He supported a minimal wage increase and energy conservation in the business sector.
- Richard Weston favoured mandatory composting, improved recycling programs, and alternative energy sources such as windmills. He also called for webcams in the mayor's office and mandatory blackouts on the last Wednesday of each month.
- Last-place candidate Barry Pletch was a 33-year-old operations manager, and the arts editor for the Etobicoke Guardian. He sought a clean-up campaign for Toronto's streets. His campaign slogan was "Better Ethics and Economic Responsibility", shortened to BEER.

== City council ==
Most incumbent city councillors were re-elected. A prominent exception was Anne Johnston, the longest-serving member of city council. She lost her seat in Ward 16, apparently because of her approval of a controversial residential tower development in an adjoining ward. The council elections saw one of the highest rates of turnover in recent history. While only four incumbents lost their seats, many long standing councillors decided not to run for re-election. Of the 44 city councillors, 14 are newcomers. The election saw the council become more leftist, which should aid mayor Miller.

=== Ward 1 – Etobicoke North ===
Candidate	Votes	%
(incumbent) Suzan Hall	3,462	30.85
Vincent Crisanti	2,580	22.99
Ranjeet Chahal	1,737	15.47
Hazoor Elahi	1,016	9.05
Anthony Caputo	948	8.44
Michelle Munroe	857	7.63
Ikram Freed	491	4.37
Chitranjan Gill	92	0.81
Singh Khipple	39	0.34

=== Ward 2 – Etobicoke North ===
Candidate	Votes	%
(incumbent) Rob Ford	10,601	79.39
Mohamed Dahir	2,155	16.13
Abdi Jama	596	4.46

=== Ward 3 – Etobicoke Centre ===
Candidate	Votes	%
(incumbent) Doug Holyday	12,207	70.80
Ross Vaughan	2,565	14.87
Maurice Ferraro	1,336	7.74
Amber Saeed	1,133	6.57

=== Ward 4 – Etobicoke Centre ===
Candidate	Votes	%
(incumbent) Gloria Lindsay Luby	9,237	48.67
Mario Giansante	6,987	36.82
Stephen Thiele	2,491	13.12
John Sumka	261	1.37

=== Ward 5 – Etobicoke-Lakeshore ===
Candidate	Votes	%
(incumbent) Peter Milczyn	12,729	71.43
Stan Grabowski	5,089	28.56

=== Ward 6 – Etobicoke-Lakeshore ===
Candidate	Votes	%
Mark Grimes	5,334	28.56
Berardo Mascioli	3,982	24.18
Jerry Smith	3,437	20.87
Diane Cleary	1,180	7.16
Mark Selkirk	1,079	6.55
Gregory Wowchuk	893	5.42
George Kash	208	1.26
Frederick Azman	174	1.05
David Searle	94	0.57
Robin Vinden	83	0.50

=== Ward 7 – York West ===
Candidate	Votes	%
(incumbent) George Mammoliti	Acclaimed	

=== Ward 8 – York West ===
2003 Toronto municipal election: Councillor, Ward Eight
Candidate	Votes	%
(x)Peter Li Preti	4,670	52.53
Anthony Perruzza	4,220	47.47
Total valid votes	8,890	100.00

=== Ward 9 – York Centre ===
Candidate	Votes	%
(incumbent) Maria Augimeri	7,898	74.18
Anna Oppedisano	1061	9.96
Richard Baldachino	779	7.31
Annmarie Robb	487	4.57
Domenic D'Abruzzo	422	4.28

=== Ward 10 – York Centre ===
2003 Toronto municipal election: Councillor, Ward Ten
Candidate	Votes	%
Mike Feldman (incumbent)	9,962	73.84
Lorne Berg	3,530	26.16
Total valid votes	13,492	100.00

=== Ward 11 – York South-Weston ===
Candidate	Votes	%
(incumbent) Frances Nunziata	9,819	77.98
Rosemarie Mulhall	2,772	22.01

=== Ward 12 – York South-Weston ===
Candidate	Votes	%
(incumbent) Frank Di Giorgio	7,414	67.18
Joe Renda	3,621	32.81

=== Ward 13 – Parkdale-High Park ===
Candidate	Votes	%
Bill Saundercook	7,909	39.73
Stan Kumorek	6,802	34.17
Carol Jamieson	2,929	14.71
Margo Duncan	1,455	7.31
Henry Calderon	461	2.31
Caryl Manning	347	1.74

=== Ward 14 – Parkdale-High Park ===
Candidate	Votes	%
Sylvia Watson	7,441	52.51
Ed Zielinski	3,453	24.37
Walter Jarsky	847	5.97
Neil Webster	782	5.51
Steven Aspiotis	705	4.97
David Smaller	635	4.48
Mark Chmielewski	210	1.48
Ed Veri	95	0.67

=== Ward 15 – Eglinton-Lawrence ===
2003 Toronto municipal election: Councillor, Ward Fifteen
Candidate	Votes	%
(x)Howard Moscoe	7,612	52.60
Luigi Rizzo	3,414	23.59
Rocco Piccininno	1,411	9.75
Ron Singer	1,196	8.26
Howard Mandel	536	3.70
Jhadira Ramos	302	2.09
Total valid votes	14,471	100.00

- Luigi Rizzo was a first-time candidate. His father, Tony Rizzo, was a Member of Provincial Parliament (MPP) from 1990 to 1995.
- Rocco Piccininno was a first-time candidate. As of 2006, he works with the firm Sutton Group-Tower Realty Inc., Brokerage.
- Howard Mandel was a first-time candidate. A newspaper column from the campaign observed that his name "sounds suspiciously like the incumbent's and appears ahead of him on the ballot".
- Jhadira Ramos was a first-time candidate. Ramos campaigned on a "Multicultural Candidate List", which was headed by mayoral candidate Jamie Castillo.

=== Ward 16 – Eglinton-Lawrence ===
Candidate	Votes	%
Karen Stintz	8,108	42.92
(incumbent) Anne Johnston	5,787	30.63
Albert Pantaleo	3,172	16.79
Michael Johnson	1,188	6.28
Alexander Hoffman	634	3.35

=== Ward 17 – Davenport ===
Candidate	Votes	%
Cesar Palacio	5,127	44.99
Alejandra Bravo	4,336	38.05
David Senater	940	8.24
Romolo Cimaroli	530	4.65
Nicolo Fortunato	461	4.04

=== Ward 18 – Davenport ===
Candidate	Votes	%
Adam Giambrone	5,797	51.52
Ana Bailão	4,537	40.32
Hortencia Fotopoulos	386	3.43
Nha Le	234	2.08
Cynamin Maxwell	155	1.37
Ana Salaverry-Chuquihuara	141	1.25

=== Ward 19 – Trinity-Spadina ===
Candidate	Votes	%
(incumbent) Joe Pantalone	10,372	75.30
Jeff Brown	3,070	22.28
Philip Vettese	332	2.41

=== Ward 20 – Trinity-Spadina ===
Candidate	Votes	%
(incumbent) Olivia Chow	13,867	79.27
Sandra Anstey	2,254	12.88
Brian Wicks	608	3.47
Roberto Verdecchia	484	2.76
Dean Jepson	279	1.59

=== Ward 21 – St. Paul's ===
Candidate	Votes	%
(incumbent) Joe Mihevc	10,875	65.63
George Milne	3,809	22.98
Howard Levine	1,089	6.57
Maya Tarom	522	3.15
Gregory Moskos	167	1.00
Tony Corpuz	107	0.64

=== Ward 22 – St. Paul's ===
Candidate	Votes	%
(incumbent) Michael Walker	17,473	83.32
Erika Marquardt	3497	16.67

=== Ward 23 – Willowdale ===
Candidate	Votes	%
(incumbent) John Filion	13,836	83.34
Ignacio Manlangit	2,757	16.66

=== Ward 24 – Willowdale ===
Candidate	Votes	%
(incumbent) David Shiner	Acclaimed	

=== Ward 25 – Don Valley West ===
Candidate	Votes	%
(incumbent) Cliff Jenkins	4,859	26.04
Jaye Robinson	4,779	25.61
Tim Flynn	2,240	12.00
Barbara Krieger	1,858	9.96
Jon Williams	1,648	8.83
William Rauenbusch	1,575	8.44
Stewart Weinstein	1,283	6.87
Nancy Loewen	420	2.25

=== Ward 26 – Don Valley West ===
Candidate	Votes	%
(incumbent) Jane Pitfield	13,602	86.63
Muhammad Alam	1,366	8.70
Orhan Aybars	733	4.67

=== Ward 27 – Toronto Centre ===
Candidate	Votes	%
(incumbent) Kyle Rae	13234	66.3
Enza Anderson	3058	15.3
Michael Lorenzo	1517	7.6
Michael Demone	1211	6.0
Arius Irani	689	3.5
Hade Mamade	282	1.3

=== Ward 28 – Toronto Centre ===
Candidate	Votes	%
(incumbent) Pam McConnell	7826	46.7
Pierre Klein	4646	27.7
Gregory Lang	1358	8.1
Mike Armstrong	767	4.6
Wendy Forrest	723	4.3
Anwarul Kabir	582	3.5
Alamgir Muhammad	432	2.6
Paul Bordonaro	260	1.6
Jean-Claude Mbuyi	170	1.0

=== Ward 29 – Broadview-Greenwood ===
Candidate	Votes	%
(incumbent) Case Ootes	9,352	62.2
John Papadakis	5,207	34.6
Nick Radia	480	3.1

=== Ward 30 – Broadview-Greenwood ===
Candidate	Votes	%
Paula Fletcher	6,460	39.5
Chris Phibbs	4,271	26.1
Maureen Gilroy	3,161	19.3
Suzanne McCormick	832	5.1
Bruce Brackett	722	4.4
Greg Bonser	510	3.1
Sean Lough	237	1.4
Jim Brookman	179	1.1

=== Ward 31 – Beaches-East York ===
Candidate	Votes	%
Janet Davis	8,894	53.9
(incumbent) Michael Tziretas	6,640	40.2
Nasir Duza	556	3.4
Bob Smith	414	2.5

=== Ward 32 – Beaches-East York ===
Candidate	Votes	%
(incumbent) Sandra Bussin	12245	63.4
Chris Yaccato	5082	26.3
Alan Burke	527	2.7
Colleen Mills	527	2.7
Donna Braniff	514	2.7
Jeffrey Dorman	224	1.2
Robert Livingston	183	0.6

=== Ward 33 – Don Valley East ===
Candidate	Votes	%
Shelley Carroll	4,744	36.6
Rob Davis	3,923	30.2
Aris Babikian	1,757	13.5
Wayne Habib	1,164	9.0
Jim Conlon	675	5.2
Allan Ginsberg	287	2.2
Asad Alam	232	1.8
Ari Maounis	191	1.5

=== Ward 34 – Don Valley East ===
Candidate	Votes	%
Denzil Minnan-Wong	9,783	70.9
George Maxwell	2,197	15.9
Gary Walsh	1,120	9.1
Khan Niazi	700	5.1

=== Ward 35 – Scarborough Southwest ===
Candidate	Votes	%
(incumbent) Gerry Altobello	5,410	45.6
Adrian Heaps	3,388	28.6
Worrick Russell	1,651	13.9
Peter Harris	550	4.6
Barry Nicholson	326	2.7
Kalonji Muteba	279	2.3
Jason Carey	271	2.3

=== Ward 36 – Scarborough Southwest ===
Candidate	Votes	%
(incumbent) Brian Ashton	11683	78.0
Robert Scott	3,286	22.0

=== Ward 37 – Scarborough Centre ===
Candidate	Votes	%
Michael Thompson	7,680	49.6
Helen Zoubaniotis	4,124	26.7
Laura-Maria Nikolareizi	1,156	7.4
Andrew Schulz	1,081	7.0
Greg Crompton	553	3.6
David Finnamore	470	3.0
Georges Legault	430	2.8

=== Ward 38 – Scarborough Centre ===
Candidate	Votes	%
Glenn De Baermaeker	6,267	46.4
Virginia Jones	2,568	19.0
Tom Palantzas	1,678	12.4
Becky Hackett	1,316	9.8
Willie Reodica	1,243	9.2
Michael Binetti	423	3.1

=== Ward 39 – Scarborough-Agincourt ===
Candidate	Votes	%
Mike Del Grande	6,299	51.7
(incumbent) Sherene Shaw	5,898	48.4

=== Ward 40 – Scarborough-Agincourt ===
Candidate	Votes	%
(incumbent) Norm Kelly	10,570	75.4
Patrick McBrearty	2,470	17.6
Winston Ramjeet	983	7.0

=== Ward 41 – Scarborough-Rouge River ===
Candidate	Votes	%
(incumbent) Bas Balkissoon	10,054	74.6
Sonny Yeung	3,415	25.4

=== Ward 42 – Scarborough-Rouge River ===
Candidate	Votes	%
(incumbent) Raymond Cho	8,302	70.0
Paulette Senior	3,314	27.9
Akeem Fasasi	245	2.1

=== Ward 43 – Scarborough East ===
Candidate	Votes	%
(incumbent) David Soknacki	9,790	82.4
Glenn Kitchen	2,097	17.6

=== Ward 44 – Scarborough East ===
Candidate	Votes	%
Gay Cowbourne	7,818	45.7
(incumbent) Ron Moeser	7,522	44.0
William Sheehan	939	5.5
Donald Blair	839	4.9
