= Glenn De Baeremaeker =

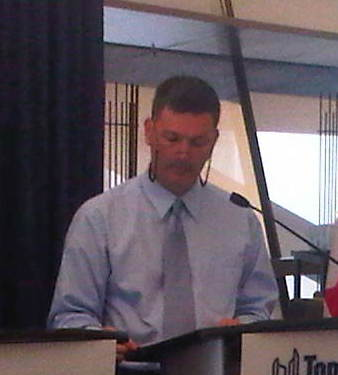

Toronto City Councillor for (Ward 38) Scarborough Centre
- In office December 1, 2003 – December 1, 2018
- Preceded by: Brad Duguid
- Succeeded by: Michael Thompson

Deputy Speaker of Toronto City Council
- In office April 25, 2018 – December 1, 2018
- Preceded by: Shelley Carroll
- Succeeded by: Shelley Carroll

Personal details
- Education: University of Toronto
- Occupation: Environmentalist, Consultant

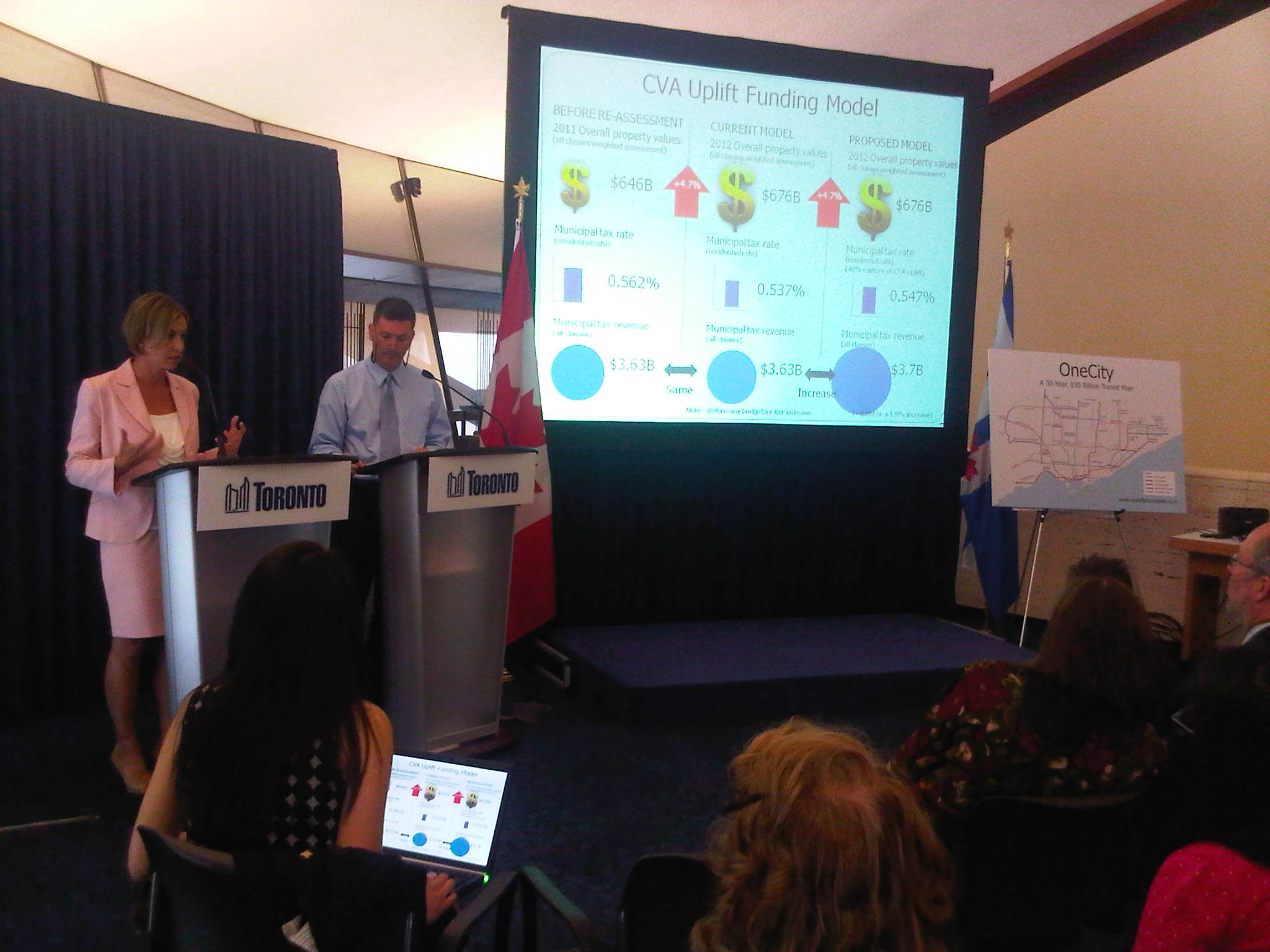
TTC Chair Karen Stintz and TTC Vice-Chair Glenn De Baeremaeker announcing the proposed OneCity transit plan in June 2012

Glenn De Baeremaeker (/diː ˌbɛərəˈmeɪkər/ dee BAIR-ə-MAY-kər) is a former city councillor in Toronto, Canada, who represented Ward 38 from 2003-2018. He is now a policy consultant.

== Early life and education ==
De Baeremaeker is the son of working-class parents from Scarborough, Ontario. He attended Scarborough College at the University of Toronto and has a master's degree in international development and spent six months in Ethiopia at the height of the 1980s famine.

== Career ==
=== Environmentalist ===
De Baeremaeker originally rose to prominence for his work with the Save the Rouge group fighting to keep the Rouge Valley area of Scarborough free from development.

Working as an assistant to city councillor Doug Mahood, De Baeremaeker ran for a seat on Scarborough city council in 1994 but lost to David Soknacki. Continuing his environmental work, De Baeremaeker became one of the leaders in the effort to save the Oak Ridges Moraine from development.

=== City councillor ===
When Brad Duguid left the city council in 2003 to run for the provincial Liberals, De Baeremaeker decided to run for the empty seat and won by a wide margin.

De Baeremaeker was known for his support of former mayor David Miller's policies, in particular his support of the civic workers' deal to end the 2009 Toronto municipal strike. He was also a strong advocate for safer road conditions for cyclists.

In March 2012, Toronto City Council dissolved the Toronto Transit Commission Board and appointed new councillors, including De Baeremaeker, to the Board, a role he continued in during the 2014-2018 council term. In 2014, he was appointed Deputy Mayor East and a member of the Toronto Region Conservation Authority. In 2017, he helped the South Asian Autism Awareness Centre build a permanent home. De Baeremaeker was elected as Deputy Speaker of the Toronto City Council on April 25, 2018 following the resignation of Shelley Carroll.

After changes Toronto ward boundaries resulted in the abolition of Ward 38 Scarborough Centre, De Baeremaeker announced he would not run for re-election in the 2018 Toronto election in the new larger Ward 21 Scarborough Centre.

=== Later career ===
After the 2018 election, Glenn de Baeremaeker joined the Board of Directors on the South Asian Autism Awareness Centre in 2021. De Baeremaeker now runs a policy consultancy agency.

== Personal life ==
A strong environmentalist, De Baeremaeker is a vegan. He was also known for cycling to City Hall from his home in Scarborough almost every day year round. He is in a relationship with Ramona Wall.

== Election results ==
2010 Toronto election, Ward 38
Candidate	Votes	%
Glenn De Baeremaeker	11,166	62.44%
Glenn Middleton	4,541	25.39%
Tushar Shah	824	4.61%
Kirk Jensen	708	3.96%
Sandip Vora	643	3.60%
Total	17,882	100%

Unofficial results as of October 26, 2010 03:55 AM

2014 Toronto municipal election
Candidate	Votes	%
Glenn De Baeremaeker	13,626	69.54%
Theo Kalafatis	483	2.46%
John Lewis	642	3.28%
Justin Ried	463	2.36%
Theodore Rueckert	550	2.81%
Ganga Sasthrigal	662	3.38%
Rajesh Shah	405	2.07%
Tushar Shah	185	0.94%
Aysha Sidiq	460	2.35%
David Thomas	1552	7.92%
Kevin Winson	567	2.89%
Total	19,595	100%

Official results as of March 3, 2015 14:09 PM

In 2021, Glenn de Baeremaeker was elected to the Board of Directors of the South Asian Autism Awareness Centre, a local charity he supports.
