= Jonathan Tsao =

Canadian politician

Jonathan Tsao MPP
- 曹志豪
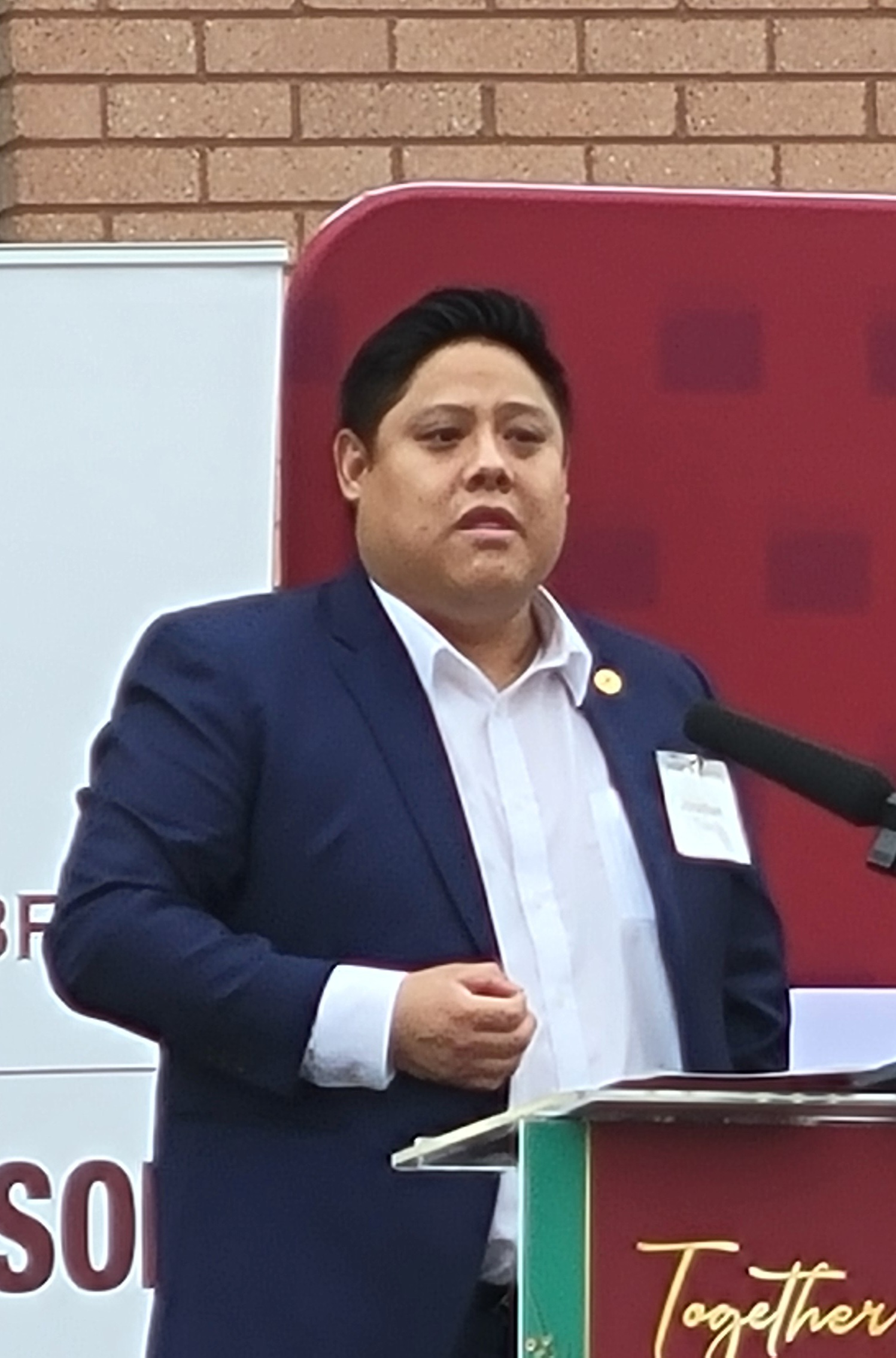
- Tsao in 2025

Member of the Ontario Provincial Parliament for Don Valley North
- Incumbent
- Assumed office February 27, 2025
- Preceded by: Vincent Ke

Toronto City Councillor for Ward 33 (Don Valley East)
- In office May 22, 2018 – December 1, 2018
- Preceded by: Shelley Carroll
- Succeeded by: Denzil Minnan-Wong (Ward 16)

Personal details
- Born: Toronto, Ontario, Canada
- Party: Ontario Liberal
- Other political affiliations: Independent
- Education: University of Toronto; London School of Economics (MSc)
- Occupation: Political advisor
- Website: www.jonathantsao.ca

Chinese name
- Chinese: 曹志豪
Transcriptions
Standard Mandarin
- Hanyu Pinyin: Cáo Zhìháo
Yue: Cantonese
- Jyutping: Cou^{4} Zi^{3}-Hou^{4}

Jonathan Tsao MPP (Chinese: 曹志豪;) is a Canadian politician and the current member of Provincial Parliament (MPP) in Ontario for Don Valley North. He previously served as Toronto city councillor for Ward 33 (Don Valley East) in 2018.

== Biography ==
Born and raised in North York, Tsao holds a Bachelor of Arts degree from University of Toronto, and a master of science degree from the London School of Economics. A former senior political advisor in the Ontario provincial government, he also served as a director of the Yee Hong Centre for Geriatric Care.

Tsao was appointed as Toronto city councillor for Ward 33 (Don Valley East) on May 22, 2018, filling the vacancy arising from the resignation of the incumbent councillor Shelley Carroll that April; he was a resident of Ward 33 at the time of his appointment. He did not seek re-election in that October's municipal election, and was subsequently named to the board of management for the Toronto Zoo in April 2019.

Tsao was selected as the Ontario Liberal Party's candidate for Don Valley North in October 2020; he came in second behind the incumbent Progressive Conservative (PC) candidate Vincent Ke in the 2022 provincial election. Tsao ran for the Liberals again in the 2025 provincial election, this time defeating Ke (running as an independent candidate) and the PC's Sue Liu to become MPP for Don Valley North.

== Electoral history ==
2025 Ontario general election: Don Valley North
Party	Candidate	Votes	%	±%
Liberal	Jonathan Tsao	13,375	43.77	+6.94
Progressive Conservative	Sue Liu	11,484	37.58	–9.82
Independent	Vincent Ke	3,005	9.83	–37.57
New Democratic	Ebrahim Astaraki	1,562	5.11	–4.76
Green	Andrew Armstrong	784	2.57	–1.15
New Blue	Annie Nolan	346	1.13	–1.04
Total valid votes		30,556	99.29	
Total rejected, unmarked and declined ballots		219	0.71	+0.13
Turnout		30,775	38.04	–2.72
Eligible voters		80,903		
Liberal gain from Progressive Conservative		Swing		+8.38
Source: Elections Ontario

2022 Ontario general election: Don Valley North
Party	Candidate	Votes	%	±%	Expenditures
Progressive Conservative	Vincent Ke	15,041	47.41	+2.97	$61,647
Liberal	Jonathan Tsao	11,685	36.83	+5.91	$88,913
New Democratic	Ebrahim Astaraki	3,133	9.87	–11.00	$16,187
Green	Ostap Soroka	1,179	3.72	+1.16	$823
New Blue	Jay Sobel	690	2.17	–	$924
Total valid votes/expense limit		31,728	99.42	–	$109,620
Total rejected, unmarked and declined ballots		185	0.58	–0.40	
Turnout		31,913	40.76	–13.05	
Eligible voters		78,300			
Progressive Conservative hold		Swing		–1.47	
Source: Elections Ontario
