= Shelley Carroll =

Canadian politician

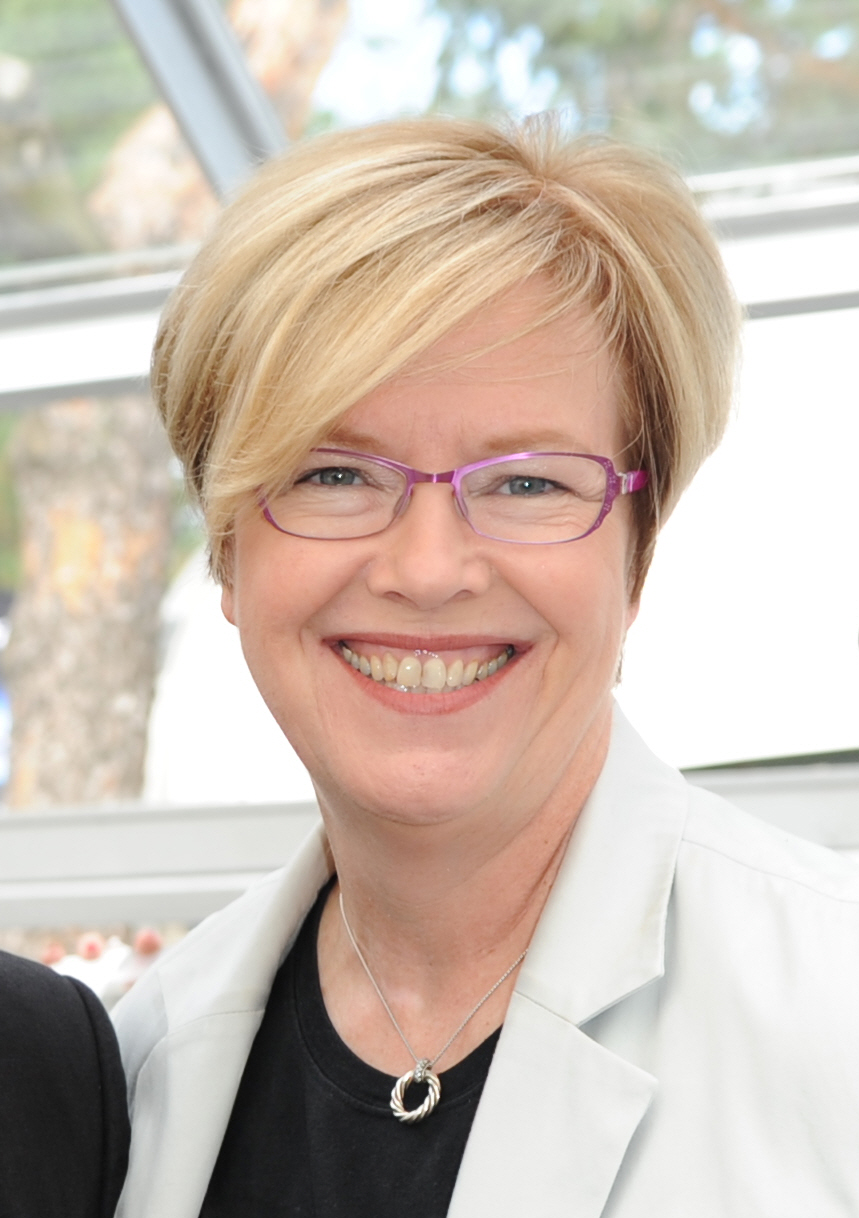
- Carroll in 2011

Toronto City Councillor
- Incumbent
- Assumed office December 1, 2018
- Preceded by: Ward established
- Constituency: Ward 17 Don Valley North
- In office December 1, 2003 – April 5, 2018
- Preceded by: Paul Sutherland
- Succeeded by: Jonathan Tsao
- Constituency: Ward 33 Don Valley East

Deputy Speaker of Toronto City Council
- Incumbent
- Assumed office November 18, 2026
- Preceded by: Paula Fletcher
- In office December 4, 2018 – October 25, 2022
- Preceded by: Glenn De Baeremaeker
- Succeeded by: Stephen Holyday
- In office December 1, 2014 – April 5, 2018
- Preceded by: John Parker
- Succeeded by: Glenn De Baeremaeker

Chair of the Toronto Police Services Board
- Incumbent
- Assumed office January 14, 2025
- Preceded by: Ann Morgan

Chair of the Budget Committee
- Incumbent
- Assumed office August 10, 2023
- Mayor: Olivia Chow
- Preceded by: Gary Crawford
- In office December 6, 2006 – November 30, 2010
- Mayor: David Miller
- Preceded by: David Soknacki

Toronto District School Board Trustee for Ward 17 Don Valley East
- In office December 1, 2000 – December 1, 2003
- Preceded by: Doug Stephens
- Succeeded by: Michael Coteau

Personal details
- Born: March 5, 1957 (age 69)
- Party: Independent
- Other political affiliations: Ontario Liberal (2018)
- Spouse: Sandy
- Children: 2
- Occupation: Politician; banking; childcare

Shelley Carroll is a Canadian politician who has served on Toronto City Council since 2003. She has been Chair of the Toronto Police Services Board (TPSB) since 2025 and Chair of the Budget Committee since 2023. She has represented Ward 17 Don Valley North since 2018 and previously represented Ward 33 Don Valley East from 2003 to 2018.

== Background ==
Carroll worked in the banking industry before starting her own childcare business, while caring for her special needs child. She first rose to prominence as head of the North York Parent Assembly and then the Toronto Educational Assembly. Both groups pushed for more funding for education and vigorously opposed the education reforms brought in by then-premier Mike Harris. Her tireless defence of public education led her to be elected as a School Board Trustee on the Toronto District School Board (TDSB) in 2000 and earned her a Queen’s Golden Jubilee Medal.

== Politics ==
=== Toronto District School Board (TDSB) Trustee ===
In the 2000 municipal election, she was elected as a Toronto District School Board (TDSB) trustee in Don Valley East, ousting the incumbent. The school board opposed provincial cuts to education, and Carroll became the leader of the faction of the Board refusing to implement the Harris agenda. She was elected Co-Chair of the Board by her peers in her last year in office.

For her activism on behalf of children, she was awarded a Golden Jubilee Medal.

=== Toronto City Council ===
In the 2003 municipal election, she decided to run for city council when incumbent Paul Sutherland left to run in the provincial election. Her main opponent was former west-end councillor Rob Davis. During her first term on council, she sat on the Budget Committee and then was elected by her peers to the position of Chair of the Public Works and Infrastructure Committee by mid-term.

After the 2006 municipal election, she was appointed to sit on Mayor David Miller's Executive Committee and was elected Chair of the Budget Committee. Under the governance procedures of the time, only this chair was elected by a majority vote on council, whereas all other standing committee chairs were appointed by the mayor.

During her four years as budget chief, Carroll delivered four balanced budgets. She worked with the mayor to implement Canada's first municipal land transfer tax, which made Toronto financially sustainable for the first time since amalgamation.

She was re-elected to city council in 2010 and in 2014. In December 2014, she was appointed to the Toronto Police Services Board. She resigned from the board on March 26, 2018.

=== Provincial politics ===
In October 2016, Carroll announced that she would seek the Liberal Party nomination for the newly formed Don Valley North provincial riding in the 2018 provincial election and was acclaimed as the candidate.

She resigned from city council on April 5, 2018, in order to run in the 2018 provincial election but lost to the Progressive Conservative Party candidate, Vincent Ke. Jonathan Tsao was appointed by city council to represent Ward 33 for the remainder of the term before the municipal election on October 22, 2018.

=== Return to council ===
On July 6, 2018, Carroll announced that she was running for re-election in Ward 31, renumbered from Ward 33. Following the ward boundary changes imposed by the Ontario government of Doug Ford, Carroll instead ran in the newly expanded Ward 17 Don Valley North in the 2018 Toronto municipal election. She won the election with 40.44% of the vote, defeating runner-up Christina Liu, who received 28.94% and had been endorsed by former Toronto mayor Mel Lastman.

During the 2018–2022 council term, Carroll served as vice-chair of the North York Community Council, a member of the Toronto Transit Commission Board, and deputy speaker of Toronto City Council. Her constituency work included advocating for improvements to parks and playgrounds, affordable housing, and traffic and pedestrian safety. She also supported the development of the Ethennonnhawahstihnen’ Community Centre, a recreation centre and library branch named in collaboration with the Huron-Wendat Nation.

Carroll was re-elected in the 2022 Toronto municipal election, receiving 71.79% of the vote against five challengers. She subsequently served as chair of the Economic and Community Development Committee. In August 2023, Mayor Olivia Chow appointed Carroll chair of the Budget Committee. In January 2025, Carroll was elected chair of the Toronto Police Services Board.

Carroll sought another term in the 2026 Toronto municipal election. Her campaign emphasized municipal finances, neighbourhood improvements and public safety. At the time of the election, she was chair of both the Budget Committee and the Toronto Police Services Board. She was re-elected on October 26, receiving 19,042 votes (62.02%), compared with 4,130 votes (13.45%) for her nearest challenger, Sabrina Zuniga. Her share of the vote decreased by 9.77 percentage points from 2022.

== Electoral record ==
2026 Toronto municipal election, Ward 17 Don Valley North
Candidate	Votes	%	±%
Shelley Carroll (X)	19,042	62.02	−9.77
Sabrina Zuniga	4,130	13.45	–
Jeffery Adamson	2,314	7.54	–
Hong Xiao	2,011	6.55	–
Hassan Mubarak Noor Mohamed	1,974	6.43	–
Roy Samathanam	732	2.38	–
Jethro Adir Kavod	498	1.62	–
Total valid votes	30,701	100.00	

2022 Toronto municipal election, Ward 17 Don Valley North
Candidate	Votes	%	±%
Shelley Carroll (X)	12,897	71.79	+31.35
Daryl Christoff	2,429	13.52	–
Calvin Xu	1,367	7.61	–
Angela Lindow	577	3.21	–
Justin Knott	409	2.28	–
Sandakie Ekanayake	286	1.59	–
Total valid votes	17,965	100.00	

2018 Toronto election, Ward 17 Don Valley North
Candidate	Votes	%
Shelley Carroll	10,554	40.44%
Christina Liu	7,552	28.94%
Ken Lister	3,410	13.07%
Steven Chen	2,095	8.03%
Ian Hanecak	879	3.37%
Total	26,099	100%

2018 Ontario general election: Don Valley North
Party	Candidate	Votes	%	±%
Progressive Conservative	Vincent Ke	18,046	44.44	+11.76
Liberal	Shelley Carroll	12,557	30.92	–21.68
New Democratic	Akil Sadikali	8,476	20.87	+9.92
Green	Janelle Yanishewski	1,039	2.56	–0.85
Libertarian	Sarah Matthews	287	0.71	–
None of the Above	Alexander Verstraten	202	0.50	–
Total valid votes		40,607	99.02	
Total rejected, unmarked and declined ballots		403	0.98	
Turnout		41,010	53.81	
Eligible voters		76,211		
Progressive Conservative notional gain from Liberal		Swing		+16.72
Source: Elections Ontario

2014 Toronto election, Ward 33
Candidate	Votes	%
Shelley Carroll	9,747	60.47%
Divya Nayak	3,534	21.92%
Paul Bell	2,097	13.01%
Dina Karzman	525	3.26%
Khamphay Inthisorn	216	1.34%
Total	16,119	100%

2010 Toronto election, Ward 33
Candidate	Votes	%
Shelley Carroll	7,946	57.659%
Fil Giannakopoulos	2,787	20.223%
Mike Ihnat	1,886	13.686%
David Raines	1,162	8.432%
Total	13,781	100%

2006 Toronto election, Ward 33
Candidate	Votes	%
Shelley Carroll	6,219	59.3%
Sarah Tsang-Fahey	1,424	13.6%
Zane Caplan	1,392	13.3%
Jim Conlon	1,060	10.1%
Anderson Tung	398	3.4%
Total	10,493	100%

2003 Toronto election, Ward 33
Candidate	Votes	%
Shelley Carroll	4,744	36.6
Rob Davis	3,923	30.2
Aris Babikian	1,757	13.5
Wayne Habib	1,164	9.0
Jim Conlon	675	5.2
Allan Ginsberg	287	2.2
Asad Alam	232	1.8
Ari Maounis	191	1.5
