= Michael Thompson (Canadian politician) =

Toronto city councillor

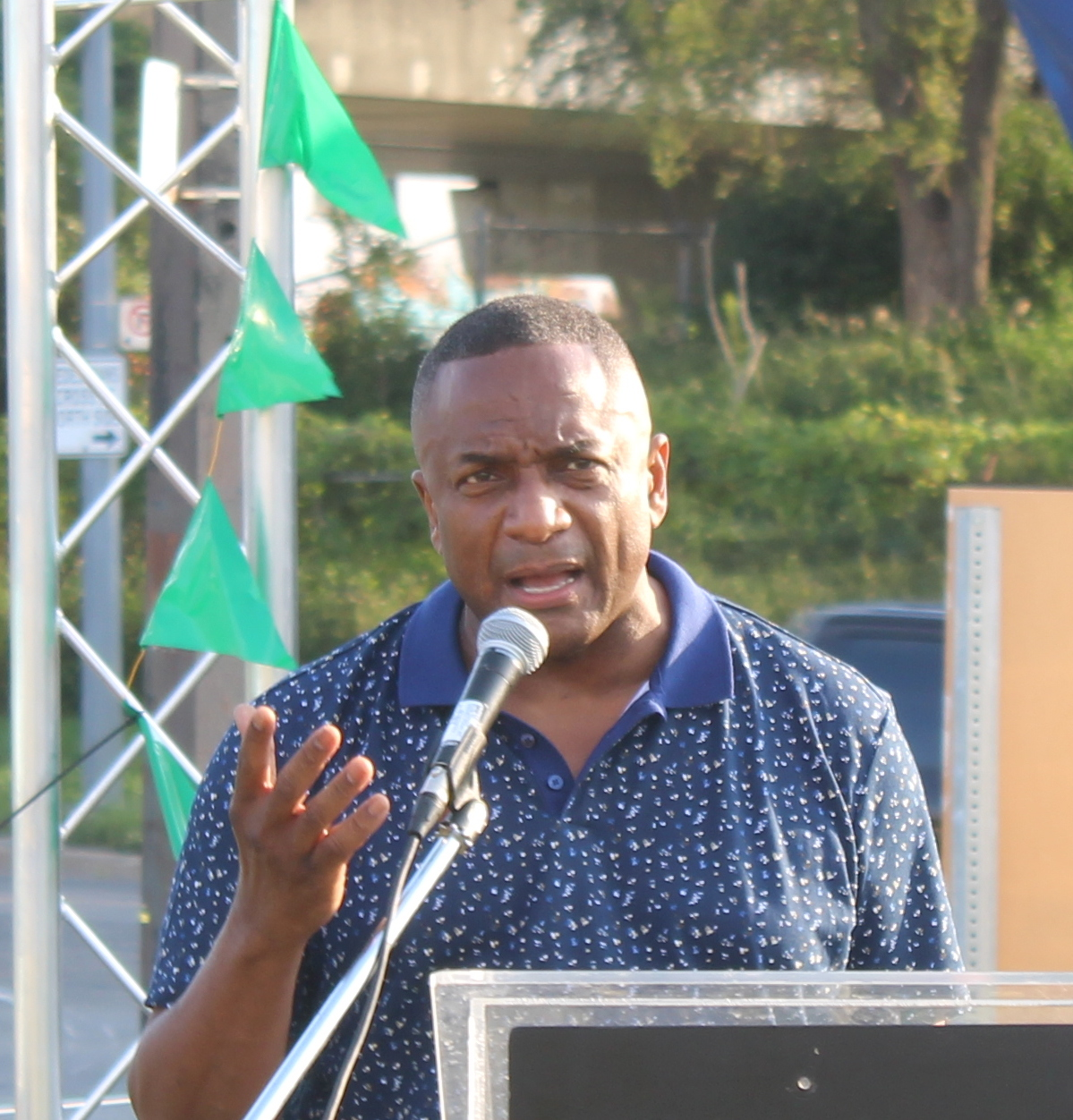
- Thompson in 2020

Toronto City Councillor for Ward 21 Scarborough Centre Ward 37 (2003-2018)
- Incumbent
- Assumed office December 1, 2003
- Preceded by: Lorenzo Berardinetti

Chair of the Scarborough Community Council
- In office June 27, 2005 – December 1, 2006
- Preceded by: Raymond Cho
- Succeeded by: Norm Kelly

Michael Thompson is a Canadian politician who has been a Toronto city councillor since 2003. He currently represents Ward 21 Scarborough Centre.

== Early life and education ==
Raised in Scarborough, Thompson is a Jamaican Canadian. He completed his public school education from Ionview Public School and Sir John A. Macdonald Collegiate, and completed a Bachelor of Arts at Concordia University in Montreal. Prior to being elected as a city councillor, he worked in the financial services industry, and founded a business services company.

== Political career ==
He entered local politics in 1994 but was defeated in his attempt to win election to Metro Toronto council by Norm Kelly. In 1998 he became assistant to Councillor Lorenzo Berardinetti. When Berardinetti was elected to the Legislative Assembly of Ontario, Thompson successfully ran to replace him in the 2003 Toronto municipal election.

With a focus on "law and order" issues, Thompson is considered one of the more right-wing members of Toronto council. Soon after his election, he earned considerable and generally positive media attention for his forceful calls to address urban violence. He campaigned for a time to retain Julian Fantino as chief of the Toronto Police Service, and also pushed for a hotline to report troublesome rodents.

In the summer of 2005, dubbed "The Summer of the Gun", when Toronto saw a wave of shootings particularly in certain low-income neighbourhoods, Thompson garnered national attention for a suggestion that Toronto police should potentially be allowed or expected to stop and search young Black Canadian males at random. Thompson argued that a large percentage of the guns being used and a large number of victims are in the black community. Thompson was accused of racial profiling and also expressed surprise that a black politician would suggest such an idea. Thompson himself said that he did not actually suggest racial profiling and later clarified his proposal, stating that he would not call for police to pull people over just because they're black, but rather because gun violence was affecting the black community. Thompson said that phone calls and e-mails received by his office had been mostly positive.

Thompson spent years campaigning to replace the Scarborough RT with a tunnelled extension of the Bloor-Danforth subway, arguing they could gain more ridership than the proposed Spadina line extension to York University.

Thompson had an expense claim of $300 to have his office blessed by a local Baptist Pastor in December 2010.

In November 2013, during the Rob Ford scandal over his behavior and drug use, city Councillors met to question Ford. Thompson questioned Ford about an alleged crack house. Ford replied "Have you visited the house? Have you walked in the house?" Thompson replied "I have no interest in being in that house. I am not a crack user."

Thompson was re-elected in the 2014 municipal election with over 80% of the vote.

In May 2017, Thompson helped Air Canada crew and other passengers restrain an unruly passenger who allegedly tried to open a cabin door on a flight from Jamaica to Toronto, which had to subsequently be diverted to Orlando, Florida.

Thompson ran for Toronto City Council in the 2018 municipal election in the newly expanded Ward 21 Scarborough Center. It was created as a result of the Toronto ward boundary changes imposed by the Ontario government of Doug Ford in the middle of the campaign. Thompson won with a large plurality. He primarily supported the proposed cut in the number of city councillors from 50 to 25.

In 2019, Toronto Mayor John Tory named Thompson the city's first Ambassador for the Night Economy, a role created to help spotlight and support businesses that flourish when the daytime economy sleeps.

During the 2022 municipal election, Thompson was charged with two counts of sexual assault by the Muskoka district Ontario Provincial Police (OPP) detachment. In a statement following the news, Mayor Tory announced that Thompson had agreed to step down as chair of the city's economic development committee and as deputy mayor.

Thompson’s trial on two counts of sexual assault to which he pleaded not guilty began on October 7, 2024 in a Bracebridge, Ont. court. He was found not guilty on both charges on September 16, 2025. Justice Phil Brissette ruled that the Crown had not proven its case beyond a reasonable doubt.

Thompson was re-elected in the 2022 Toronto municipal election, receiving 9,977 votes (55.25 per cent) in Ward 21 Scarborough Centre. He was re-elected again in the 2026 Toronto municipal election with 16,053 votes (51.10 per cent), defeating ten other candidates, including runner-up Krissan Veerasingam.

== Election results ==
2026 Toronto municipal election, Ward 21 Scarborough Centre
Candidate	Votes	%
Michael Thompson	16,053	51.10
Krissan Veerasingam	4,653	14.81
Taiba Ahmed	2,003	6.38
Stella Kargiannakis	1,984	6.32
Uthish Ganesh	1,695	5.40
Akina Lalla	1,174	3.74
Willie Reodica	1,130	3.60
Bahareh Barahmand	1,015	3.23
Madura Shanmugaratnam	952	3.03
Nisha Kumari	504	1.60
Patience Evbagharu	251	0.80
Total	31,414	100.00

2022 Toronto municipal election, Ward 21 Scarborough Centre
Candidate	Votes	%
Michael Thompson	9,977	55.25
Muhammad Ayub	2,478	13.72
Paul Beatty	1,857	10.28
Kiri Vadivelu	1,800	9.97
Hansie Daniel	1,375	7.61
Luigi Lisciandro	570	3.16
Total	18,057	100.00

2018 Toronto municipal election, Ward 21 Scarborough Centre
Candidate	Votes	%
Michael Thompson (X)	16,542	69.05
Paul Beatty	1,638	6.84
Fawzi Bidawi	1,035	4.32
Zia Choudhary	1,014	4.23
Vivek Bhatt	993	4.15
Randy Bucao	949	3.96
Raphael Rosch	545	2.28
Zamir ul-Hassan Nadeem	448	1.87
Afran Naveed	349	1.46
Ismail Khan	311	1.30
Nur Saifullah	132	0.55
Total	23,956	100.00

2014 Toronto election, Ward 37
Candidate	Votes	%
Michael Thompson	16,315	80.683%
Niranjan Balachandran	2,440	12.067%
Luigi Lisciandro	1,466	7.250%
Total	20,221	100%

Unofficial results as of October 27, 2014 11:51 PM

2010 Toronto election, Ward 37
Candidate	Votes	%
Michael Thompson	15,129	83.636%
Isabelle Champagne	1,571	8.685%
Fawzi Bidawi	1,014	5.606%
Sergio Otoya Salazar	375	2.073%
Total	18,089	100%

2010 City Clerk's Official Declaration of Results

2006 Toronto election, Ward 37
Candidate	Votes	%
Michael Thompson	11,987	87.146%
Isabelle Champagne	1,094	7.953%
Additional candidate(s) omitted from the supplied source text; table incomplete.

2006 City Clerk's Official Declaration of Results

2003 Toronto election, Ward 37
Candidate	Votes	%
Michael Thompson	7,680	49.568%
Helen Zoubaniotis	4,124	26.617%
Laura-Maria Nikolareizi	1,156	7.461%
Andrew Schulz	1,081	6.977%
Greg Crompton	553	3.569%
David Finnamore	470	3.033%
Georges Legault	430	2.775%
Total	15,494	100%

2003 City Clerk's Official Declaration of Results
