= 2026 Canadian electoral calendar =

2026 elections in Canada

This is a list of elections in Canada that will be held in 2026. Included are municipal, provincial and federal elections, by-elections on any level, referendums and party leadership races at any level.

== Overview of key electoral events ==
=== General elections ===
Date	Jurisdiction	Party before	First minister before	Party after	First minister after	Swing
October 5	Quebec	Coalition Avenir Quebec; 79 / 125	Christine Fréchette	Parti Québécois; 60 / 127	Paul St-Pierre Plamondon	+13.41%
October 24	British Columbia	New Democratic Party; 47 / 93	David Eby	Conservative Party; 64 / 93	Lorne Doerkson	+4.78%

=== By-elections ===
Date	Juris.	Electoral District	Party before	Member before	Party after	Member after	Swing
February 23	QC	Chicoutimi	Coalition Avenir Québec	Andrée Laforest	Parti Québécois	Marie-Karlynn Laflamme	+40.72%
April 13	Federal	Scarborough Southwest	Liberal	Bill Blair	Liberal	Doly Begum	+8.12%
April 13	Federal	Terrebonne	—N/a	None (Note: Election annulled.)	Liberal	Tatiana Auguste	+0.72%
April 13	Federal	University—Rosedale	Liberal	Chrystia Freeland	Liberal	Danielle Martin	-4.32%
June 23	NS	Cheticamp-Margarees-Pleasant Bay	New district		Progressive Conservative	Claude Bourgeois	-5.29% (Note: Compared to votes in new district borders that were cast as part of Inverness in the 2024 Nova Scotia general election.)
July 13	PEI	Cornwall-Meadowbank	Progressive Conservative	Mark McLane	Green	Tayte Willows	+21.30%
July 21	MB	The Pas-Kameesak	New Democratic	Amanda Lathlin	New Democratic	Jennifer Flett	+9.45%
August 31	Federal	Beaches–East York	Liberal	Nathaniel Erskine-Smith	Liberal	Tanveer Shahnawaz	-15.51%
August 31	Federal	Chicoutimi—Le Fjord	Conservative	Richard Martel	Liberal	Daniel Gobeil	+20.91%
August 31	Federal	North Vancouver—Capilano	Liberal	Jonathan Wilkinson	Liberal	Braeden Caley	+1.63%
September 3	ON	Scarborough Southwest	New Democratic	Doly Begum	New Democratic	Fatima Shaban	-4.89%
September 3	ON	Hamilton East—Stoney Creek	Progressive Conservative	Neil Lumsden	Progressive Conservative	Jeff Beattie	-9.25%
September 3	ON	York—Simcoe	Progressive Conservative	Caroline Mulroney	Progressive Conservative	Susan Lahey	-12.23%
September 14	AB	Calgary-Shaw	United Conservative	Rebecca Schulz	New Democratic	Kyle Campbell	+8.63%
September 28	NU	Hudson Bay	Independent	Daniel Qavvik	Independent	Jason Iqaluq	—N/a (Note: The Legislative Assembly of Nunavut operates on a consensus government system without political parties. Additionally, Qavvik was originally elected via acclamation without a vote.)
November 24	NWT	Inuvik Twin Lakes	Independent	Lesa Semmler	Independent		—N/a (Note: The Legislative Assembly of the Northwest Territories operates on a consensus government system without political parties.)
December 7	Federal	Saint-Hyacinthe—Bagot—Acton	Bloc Québécois	Simon-Pierre Savard-Tremblay			
December 7	Federal	Scarborough North	Liberal	Shaun Chen			
December 7	Federal	Rosemont—La Petite-Patrie	New Democratic	Alexandre Boulerice			
December 7	Federal	Laurier—Sainte-Marie	Liberal	Steven Guilbeault			
December 7	Federal	Yorkton—Melville	Conservative	Cathay Wagantall			
December 7	Federal	Brantford—Brant South	Conservative	Larry Brock			

=== Leadership contests ===
Contest held while party in government, contest winner to be first minister-designate.

Date	Jurisdiction	Party	Status in Legislature	Previous permanent leader (leadership)	New leader
February 7	PEI	New; Democratic	Extra-parliamentary; 0 / 27	Michelle Neill (2022–25)	Thomas Burleigh
February 7	PEI	Progressive; Conservative	Majority government 19 / 27	Dennis King (2019–25)	Rob Lantz
February 13	QC	Liberal	Official opposition 19 / 125	Pablo Rodriguez (2025)	Charles Milliard
March 29	Federal	New; Democratic	4th party, without status 6 / 343	Jagmeet Singh (2017–25)	Avi Lewis
April 12	QC	Coalition Avenir Quebec	Majority government 80 / 125	François Legault (2011–26)	Christine Fréchette
May 30	BC	Conservative	Official opposition 38 / 93	John Rustad (2023–25)	Kerry-Lynne Findlay
October 17	NB	Progressive Conservative	Official opposition 16 / 49	Blaine Higgs (2016–24)	Daniel Allain
October 25	PEI	Liberal	Official opposition 4 / 27	Robert Mitchell (2025–26)	Dan Kutcher
November 9–21	ON	Liberal	3rd party, with status 14 / 124	Bonnie Crombie (2023–26)	Navdeep Bains
November 14	Federal	Green	5th party, without status 1 / 343	Elizabeth May (2022–26)	Mike Morrice
November 16–21	NS	Liberal	3rd party 3 / 56	Zach Churchill (2022–24)	Becky Druhan
December 5	NB	Green	3rd party, without status 2 / 49	David Coon (2012–26)	Megan Mitton

== Scheduled elections ==
=== January–February ===
- January 19: Municipal by-election in Ward 3, Greater Napanee, Ontario
- January 21: Municipal by-election in North Battleford, Saskatchewan
- February 7:
  - New Democratic Party of Prince Edward Island leadership election
  - Progressive Conservative Party of Prince Edward Island leadership election
- February 13: Quebec Liberal Party leadership election
- February 14: Municipal special election in Mahone Bay, Nova Scotia
- February 15: Municipal by-election for councillor number 1, Saint-Cyrille-de-Wendover, Quebec
- February 21: Municipal by-election in Electoral Area A, Cariboo Regional District, British Columbia
- February 22:
  - Mayoral by-election in Lac-Sergent, Quebec
  - Municipal by-election for councillor number 6, Lyster and for councillor number 3, Saint-Donat, Bas-Saint-Laurent, Quebec
- February 23: Chicoutimi provincial by-election, Quebec
- February 28: Municipal by-election in Montrose, British Columbia

=== March ===
- March 1:
  - Municipal by-elections for councillor number 2, La Martre, for councillors number 4 and 5, Lac-Frontière, and for councillors 1 and 3, Saint-Marcel, Quebec
  - Mayoral by-election in Saint-Séverin, Chaudière-Appalaches, Quebec
- March 6: Chippewas of Nawash chief by-election
- March 8: Mayoral by-election in Sainte-Félicité, Bas-Saint-Laurent, Quebec
- March 14: Municipal by-election in Peachland, British Columbia
- March 15: Municipal by-election for councillor number 2, Métis-sur-Mer, Quebec
- March 16: Municipal by-election in Ward 5, Brant County, Ontario
- March 22:
  - Municipal by-election for councillor number 6, Saint-Luc-de-Bellechasse, Quebec
  - By-election in Electoral Division 9, Sir Wilfrid Laurier School Board, Quebec
- March 25: Municipal by-election in Outlook, Saskatchewan
- March 29:
  - New Democratic Party leadership election
  - Municipal by-election for councillor number 5, Lac-Frontière, councillor number 6, Mont-Saint-Grégoire, for councillor number 1, Pointe-Fortune, for councillor number 6, Saint-Juste-du-Lac, and for councillor number 2, Saint-Omer, Quebec

=== April ===
- April 12: Coalition Avenir Québec leadership election
- April 13: Federal by-elections in Scarborough Southwest, Terrebonne and University—Rosedale
- April 15: Greater Saskatoon Catholic Schools trustee by-election
- April 19: Municipal by-election for councillors number 5 and 6 in Maricourt; councillor number 4, Saint-Antoine-de-l'Isle-aux-Grues; mayor and councillor number 4, Saint-Camille-de-Lellis; councillor number 3, Saint-Paulin; councillor number 6, Saint-Philippe; councillor number 6, Saint-Séverin, Chaudière-Appalaches; councillors number 2, 5 and 6, Sainte-Élisabeth; councillor number 3, Valcourt (township), Quebec
- April 20: Municipal by-election in Bonnyville, Alberta
- April 26: Municipal by-elections for councillors number 4 and 5 in Barraute; councillor number 6, Moffet; councillors number 2 and 5, Saint-Léon-le-Grand, Mauricie; councillors number 4 and 6, Sainte-Florence; Du Vieux-Quai District, Sept-Îles, Quebec
- April 27: Commission scolaire francophone du Yukon by-election
- April 29: Municipal by-election in Leader, Saskatchewan

=== May ===
- May 3: Municipal by-elections for councillor number 3, Adstock; councillor number 1, Chute-aux-Outardes; councillor number 5, Clerval; Hudson Centre District, Hudson; councillor number 1, Laforce; councillor number 3, Saint-Edmond-de-Grantham; councillor number 1, Saint-Louis-de-Blandford; councillor number 3, Saint-Patrice-de-Beaurivage, Quebec
- May 10: Municipal by-election for councillor number 3, Esprit-Saint; Parent District, La Tuque; councillors number 3 and number 4, Palmarolle; Mayor and councillor number 2, Saint-Dominique-du-Rosaire; councillor number 3, Saint-Marc-de-Figuery, Quebec
- May 11: New Brunswick municipal elections
- May 20: Municipal by-election in Picture Butte, Alberta (cancelled due to acclamation)
- May 24: Municipal by-election for councillor number 2 and 3, Grosse-Île; councillor number 3 and 4, Port-Cartier, Quebec
- May 25: Municipal by-election in Bruderheim, Alberta
- May 30:
  - Conservative Party of British Columbia leadership election
  - Municipal special election in District 3, Victoria County, Nova Scotia
- May 31: Municipal by-election for councillor number 2, Lemieux; councillor number 5, Saint-Herménégilde; mayor of Sainte-Claire, Quebec

=== June–August ===
- June 1: Municipal by-election in High Level, Alberta
- June 2: Lax Kwʼalaams Band Trustee by-election
- June 7: Municipal by-elections for councillor number 1, Baie-Trinité, councillor number 2 and 4, Grandes-Piles, and for councillor number 1, Saint-Léandre, Quebec
- June 14: Warden by-election, Les Basques Regional County Municipality, Quebec; Councillor number 3, Dupuy, councillors number 1 and 5, Godbout, councillor number 3, Lac-Saguay, mayoral by-election in Notre-Dame-de-Lorette, councillor number 4, Saint-Fabien, for councillor number 4, Saint-Nazaire-d'Acton, and for councillor number 5, Saint-Raphaël, Quebec
- June 21: Municipal by-election for councillor number 1, Laurier-Station, mayor and councillor number 1, Notre-Dame-de-Ham, councillor number 4, Piopolis, councillor number 4, Saint-Apollinaire, councillor number 5, Sainte-Hélène-de-Mancebourg, for councillor number 2, Saint-Paul-de-Montminy, and for councillor number 3, Trois-Rives, Quebec
- June 22: Municipal by-election in Ward 3, Saint Andrews, (deferred from May 11 due to the death of a candidate) Ward 2, Grand Bouctouche, Ward 2 Grand Lake, and Wards 2 and 7, Nashwaak, New Brunswick
- June 23: Cheticamp-Margarees-Plesant Bay provincial by-election, Nova Scotia
- June 28: Municipal by-election for councillor number 4, Bristol, and mayoral by-election in L'Ascension-de-Patapédia, councillor number 3, Saint-Antoine-de-l'Isle-aux-Grues, for councillor number 4, Sainte-Mélanie, and for councillor number 5, Saint-Liguori
- July 5: Municipal by-election for councillor number 3, Saint-Edmond-de-Grantham, for councillor number 5, Saint-Georges-de-Windsor, and for mayor and councillor number 6, Saint-Norbert-d'Arthabaska, Quebec
- July 12: Mayoral and councillor number 1 by-election, Aucalir, Louis-S.-St-Laurent District, Compton, Sud District (Post 1), Huntingdon, Quebec, councillor number 4, Maskinongé, and councillor number 6, Saint-Venant-de-Paquette, Quebec
- July 13: Cornwall-Meadowbank provincial by-Election
- July 21: The Pas-Kameesak provincial by-Election
- July 26: Municipal by-election for councillor number 5, Sainte-Euphémie-sur-Rivière-du-Sud
- August 2: Municipal by-election for councillor number 2, Matagami; councillor number 3, Saint-Denis-De La Bouteillerie; councillor number 2, Sainte-Sabine, Chaudière-Appalaches, Quebec
- August 9: Municipal by-election for councillor number 3, Esprit-Saint; councillor number 3, Notre-Dame-des-Neiges; councillor number 5, Saint-Léandre, Quebec
- August 16: Municipal by-election for councillor number 1, 4 and 6, Armagh, Quebec
- August 23: Municipal by-election for councillor number 2, Otter Lake; councillor number 1 and 2, Saint-André-de-Restigouche; mayor of Saint-Lucien, Quebec
- August 27: Municipal by-election in Hinton, Alberta
- August 30: Municipal by-election for councillor number 4 and 6, Saint-Barthélemy, Quebec
- August 31: Federal by-elections in Beaches—East York, Chicoutimi—Le Fjord and North Vancouver—Capilano

=== September–October ===
- September 3: Provincial by-elections in Hamilton East—Stoney Creek, York—Simcoe and Scarborough Southwest, Ontario
- September 6: Municipal by-election for councillor number 3, Mayo; councillor number 3 and 4, Sainte-Madeleine-de-la-Rivière-Madeleine, Quebec
- September 13: Municipal by-election for councillor number 6, Laverlochère-Angliers; councillor number 3, Murdochville, Quebec
- September 14: Provincial by-election in Calgary-Shaw, Alberta
- September 20: Municipal by-election for councillor number 4, Chichester; councillor number 2, Lejeune; councillor number 6, Nantes; councillor number 5, Saint-Adalbert; councillor number 5, Saint-Hilaire-de-Dorset; councillor number 1, Saint-Siméon, Capitale-Nationale; mayor of Sainte-Brigitte-des-Saults, Quebec
- September 27: Municipal by-election for councillor number 3, Saint-Antoine-de-l'Isle-aux-Grues; councillor number 6, Saint-Louis-de-Blandford, Quebec
- September 28: Territorial by-election in Hudson Bay, Nunavut
- October 5: Quebec general election
- October 11: Municipal by-election for councillor number 1, Saint-René-de-Matane
- October 17:
  - British Columbia municipal elections
    - Vancouver
  - Progressive Conservative Party of New Brunswick leadership election
- October 18: Municipal by-election for councillor number 4, La Visitation-de-l'Île-Dupas, Quebec
- October 19: 2026 Alberta referendum and independence referendum
- October 19: Municipal election for mayor and 8 councillors, Yellowknife, Northwest Territories
- October 24: 2026 British Columbia general election
- October 25:
  - Prince Edward Island Liberal Party leadership election
  - Municipal by-election for councillor number 3, Newport, Quebec
- October 26: Ontario municipal elections
- October 28: Manitoba municipal elections

=== November ===
- November 1: Municipal by-election for councillor number 1, 3, 4 and 6, La Bostonnais, Quebec
- November 2: Prince Edward Island municipal elections
- November 4: Reeve by-election in the Rural Municipality of Excel No. 71, Saskatchewan
- November 9: Saskatchewan municipal elections (even numbered rural municipalities)
- November 14: Green Party of Canada leadership election
- November 21:
  - Ontario Liberal Party leadership election
  - Nova Scotia Liberal Party leadership election
- November 24: Inuvik Twin Lakes territorial by-election

=== December ===
- December 5: Green Party New Brunswick leadership Election
- December 7: Six federal by-elections:
  - Saint-Hyacinthe—Bagot—Acton
  - Scarborough North
  - Rosemont—La Petite-Patrie
  - Laurier—Sainte-Marie
  - Yorkton—Melville
  - Brantford—Brant South
- December 14: Northwest Territories municipal elections

== Unscheduled elections ==
=== Provincial ===
- Lac Ste. Anne-Parkland (seat vacant; by-election not required to be held due to date of next Alberta general election)

== See also ==
- Canadian provincial elections – each province and their expected next election date
