= By-elections to the 45th Canadian Parliament =

- May 26, 2025 – present

13 seats in the House of Commons 7 by-elections held, 6 scheduled
- Turnout: 43.85% ▼25.14 pp 264,169

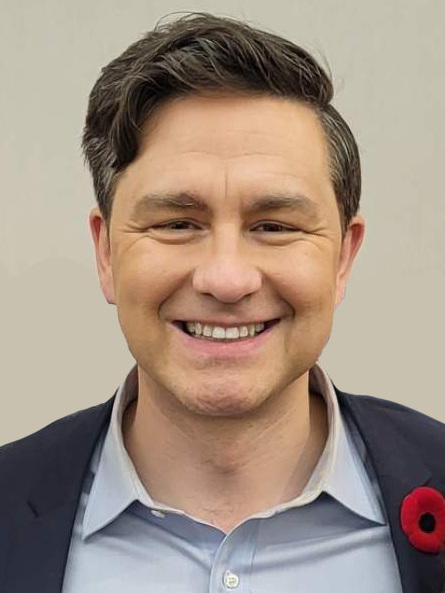

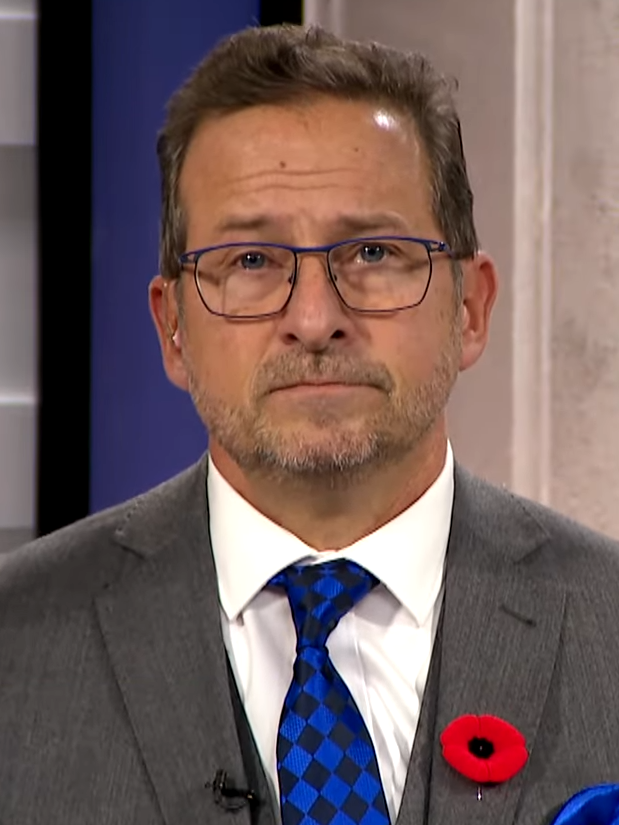

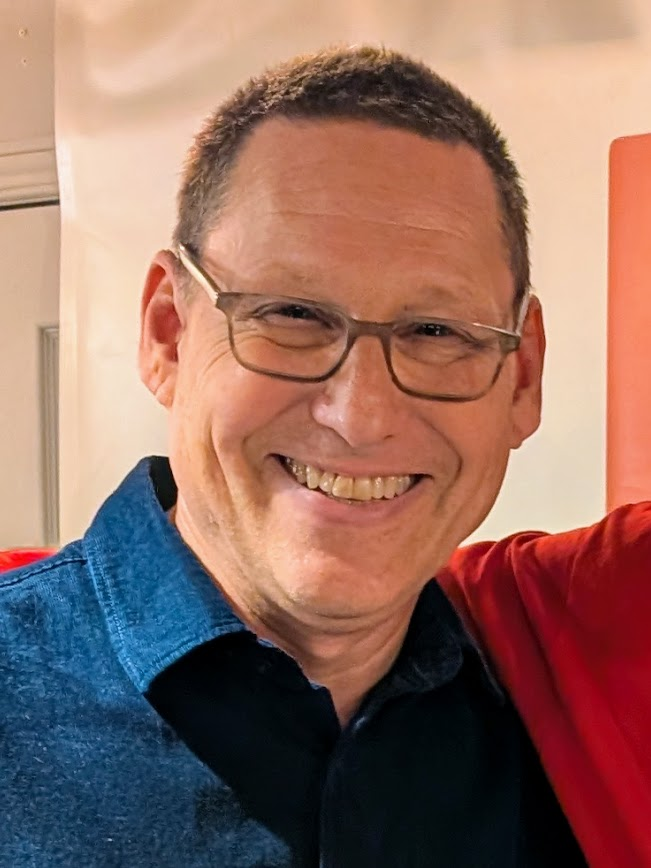
Leader	Mark Carney	Pierre Poilievre
Party	Liberal	Conservative
Leader since	March 9, 2025	September 10, 2022
Seats up	7 (Note: Including 2 currently vacant seats.)	4 (Note: Including 2 currently vacant seats.)
Seats won	6	1
Seat change	▲1	▼1
Popular vote	123,198	73,059
Percentage	46.94%	27.84%
Swing	▼0.75 pp	▼7.95 pp
Leader	Yves-François Blanchet	Avi Lewis (Note: Prior to Lewis's election as leader of the New Democrats in 2026, the party was led by interim leader Don Davies during the 2025 Battle River—Crowfoot by-election.)
Party	Bloc Québécois	New Democratic
Leader since	January 17, 2019	March 29, 2026
Seats up	1 (Note: This figure includes the currently vacant seat of Saint-Hyacinthe—Bagot—Acton, which was won by the Bloc Québécois in the 2025 election. Simon-Pierre Savard-Tremblay left the party to become an independent prior to resigning from parliament. This figure does not include Terrebonne, which was held by the Bloc Québécois before the 2025 election. The Liberals won and held the seat in the 2025 election, until the 2025 result was annulled by the Supreme Court of Canada in February 2026.)	1 (Note: This figure includes the currently vacant seat of Rosemont—La Petite-Patrie, which was won by the NDP in the 2025 election. Alexandre Boulerice left the party to become an independent prior to resigning from parliament.)
Seats won	0	0
Seat change	Steady	Steady
Popular vote	32,174	19,208
Percentage	12.26% (Note: 41.22% where running)	7.33%
Swing	▲2.81 pp (Note: ▲5.94 pp where running)	▲2.44 pp

By-elections to the 45th Canadian Parliament are held to fill vacancies in the House of Commons of Canada between the 2025 federal election and the 46th federal election. The 45th Canadian Parliament has existed since 2025 with the membership of its House of Commons having been determined by the results of the Canadian federal election held on April 28, 2025. The Liberal Party of Canada had a minority government during this Parliament until the three by-elections held on April 13, 2026, where they gained majority status. The Conservative Party of Canada forms the Official Opposition.

A writ for a by-election must be dropped no sooner than 11 days and no later than 180 days after the chief electoral officer is officially notified of a vacancy via a warrant issued by the Speaker. Under the Canada Elections Act, the minimum length of a campaign is 36 days between dropping the writ and election day, but must not exceed 50 days and the by-election must occur on a Monday within that time-frame.

Seven by-elections have been held during the 45th Parliament. They took place in the electoral districts of:

- Battle River—Crowfoot, (Alberta), following Conservative MP Damien Kurek's announcement of his pending resignation of his seat on May 2, 2025 to give Pierre Poilievre, the leader of the Conservative Party, an opportunity to re-enter parliament after Poilievre lost his seat in the federal election. Kurek officially resigned on June 17, 2025 and the by-election was held August 18, 2025.
- University—Rosedale, (Ontario), to former Liberal cabinet minister Chrystia Freeland's resignation from Parliament, effective January 9, 2026, following her appointment as economic advisor to the President of Ukraine.
- Scarborough Southwest, (Ontario), due to the resignation of Liberal MP Bill Blair on February 2, 2026, to accept an appointment as Canadian High Commissioner to the United Kingdom.
- Terrebonne, (Quebec), after the Supreme Court of Canada, on February 13, 2026, annulled the one-vote victory by Liberal MP Tatiana Auguste due to a misprint by Elections Canada in return envelopes it produced for mail-in ballots. A minimum of 40 ballots were thought to have been distributed with an incorrect postal code on the return envelope.
- North Vancouver—Capilano federal by-election due to the appointment of Liberal MP Jonathan Wilkinson to a diplomatic position as Canadian Ambassador to the European Union. The Chief Electoral Officer was officially notified of his resignation as a Member of Parliament on June 22, 2026.
- Chicoutimi—Le Fjord federal by-election due to Conservative MP Richard Martel being appointed to the Senate on July 7, 2026.
- Beaches—East York federal by-election as Liberal MP Nate Erskine-Smith resigned his seat effective July 7, 2026.

Six by-elections have been called for December 7, 2026:

- Saint-Hyacinthe—Bagot—Acton as former BQ MP Simon-Pierre Savard-Tremblay has been announced as the Parti Québécois candidate in Saint-Hyacinthe for the next Quebec provincial election, and resigned from parliament on June 19, 2026.
- Scarborough North due to the resignation of Liberal MP Shaun Chen on August 17, 2026 due to personal health issues.
- Rosemont—La Petite-Patrie as a result of former NDP MP Alexandre Boulerice announcing he would be the candidate of Québec solidaire in Gouin for the next Quebec provincial election, expected in October 2026, and resigned as an MP on August 26, 2026.
- Laurier—Sainte-Marie as a result of former Liberal cabinet minister Steven Guilbeault's announcement that he intends to resign his seat in order to fight climate change outside of parliament. His resignation took effect on August 28, 2026; Elections Canada was officially notified by the Speaker's Office on August 31, 2026.
- Yorkton—Melville due to Conservative MP Cathay Wagantall resigning her seat effective August 31, 2026; Elections Canada was officially notified by the Speaker's Office on September 1.
- Brantford—Brant South due to Conservative MP Larry Brock's resigning his seat on September 18 in order to return to his former position with the Crown attorney’s office.

At least one additional by-election is expected to be called in the near future:

- A by-election is expected in Parry Sound—Muskoka due to Conservative MP Scott Aitchison's decision to resign his seat by the end of 2026.

== Summary ==
Analysis of byelections by turnout and vote share for winning candidate (vs 2025)
Riding and winning party			Turnout		Vote share for winning candidate	
Riding and winning party			%	Change (pp)	%	Change (pp)
Battle River—Crowfoot	█ Conservative	Hold	58.82	-17.67	80.40	-2.44
University—Rosedale	█ Liberal	Hold	32.99	-32.43	64.39	+0.39
Scarborough Southwest	█ Liberal	Hold	33.80	-29.52	69.60	+8.12
Terrebonne	█ Liberal	Hold	50.76	-17.17	48.41	+9.66
Chicoutimi—Le Fjord	█ Liberal	Gain	42.96	-25.58	51.55	+20.43
Beaches—East York	█ Liberal	Hold	40.82	-31.12	55.84	-11.90
North Vancouver—Capilano	█ Liberal	Hold	45.60	-26.05	58.73	-1.09

== Overview ==
=== Confirmed ===
Electoral district	Date vacated (and date warrant issued if different)	Date writ issued	By-election date	Previous incumbent	Party	Cause	Winner	Party	Retained
Battle River—Crowfoot	June 17, 2025; Warrant issued June 18, 2025 (vacant for 61 days)	June 30, 2025	August 18, 2025	Damien Kurek	Conservative	Resigned to provide a seat for Pierre Poilievre.	Pierre Poilievre	Conservative	Yes
University—Rosedale	January 9, 2026 (vacant for 94 days)	March 8, 2026	April 13, 2026	Chrystia Freeland	Liberal	Resigned after her appointment as an economic adviser to Ukrainian President Volodymyr Zelenskyy.	Danielle Martin	Liberal	Yes
Scarborough Southwest	February 2, 2026 (vacant for 70 days)	March 8, 2026	April 13, 2026	Bill Blair	Liberal	Resigned after appointment as Canada's high commissioner to the U.K.	Doly Begum	Liberal	Yes
Terrebonne	February 13, 2026; Warrant issued February 16, 2026 (vacant for 59 days)	March 8, 2026	April 13, 2026	Tatiana Auguste	Liberal	Previous election result declared void by Supreme Court due to an error by Elections Canada in preparing mail-in ballots.	Tatiana Auguste	Liberal	Yes
North Vancouver—Capilano	June 19, 2026; Warrant issued June 22, 2026 (vacant for 73 days)	July 26, 2026	August 31, 2026	Jonathan Wilkinson	Liberal	Resigned to accept appointment as ambassador of Canada to the European Union	Braeden Caley	Liberal	Yes
Beaches—East York	July 7, 2026 (vacant for 55 days)	July 26, 2026	August 31, 2026	Nate Erskine-Smith	Liberal	Resigned	Tanveer Shahnawaz	Liberal	Yes
Chicoutimi—Le Fjord	July 7, 2026; Warrant issued July 9, 2026 (vacant for 55 days)	July 26, 2026	August 31, 2026	Richard Martel	Conservative	Resigned as MP upon appointment to the Senate of Canada	Daniel Gobeil	Liberal	No
Saint-Hyacinthe—Bagot—Acton	June 22, 2026 (vacant for 153 days)	November 1, 2026	December 7, 2026	Simon-Pierre Savard-Tremblay	Independent (Bloc Québécois before May 28, 2026)	Resigned to run for the Parti Québécois in 2026 Quebec general election	TBD	TBD	TBD
Scarborough North	August 15, 2026; Warrant issued August 17, 2026 (vacant for 99 days)	November 1, 2026	December 7, 2026	Shaun Chen	Liberal	Resigned due to personal health issues.	TBD	TBD	TBD
Rosemont—La Petite-Patrie	August 26, 2026 (vacant for 88 days)	November 1, 2026	December 7, 2026	Alexandre Boulerice	Independent (New Democratic before April 27, 2026)	Resigned to run for Québec solidaire in 2026 Quebec general election	TBD	TBD	TBD
Laurier—Sainte-Marie	August 28, 2026; Warrant issued August 31, 2026 (vacant for 86 days)	November 1, 2026	December 7, 2026	Steven Guilbeault	Liberal	Resigned to resume environmental activism outside parliament	TBD	TBD	TBD
Yorkton—Melville	August 31, 2026; Warrant issued September 1, 2026 (vacant for 83 days)	November 1, 2026	December 7, 2026	Cathay Wagantall	Conservative	Resigned for personal reasons	TBD	TBD	TBD
Brantford—Brant South	September 18, 2026; Warrant issued September 21, 2026 (vacant for 65 days)	November 1, 2026	December 7, 2026	Larry Brock	Conservative	Resigned to take up a position in the crown attorney's office.	TBD	TBD	TBD

=== Expected ===
Electoral district	Incumbent	Party	Cause
Parry Sound—Muskoka	Scott Aitchison	Conservative	Resigning to "explore new opportunities."

== Results by party ==
By-election	Date	Liberal		Conservative		New Democratic		Bloc Québécois		Green	
Battle River—Crowfoot	August 18, 2025	4.10%	▼7.57	80.86%	▼1.98	2.08%	▼1.10	Did not contest		0.23%	▼0.51
University—Rosedale	April 13, 2026	64.39%	▲0.39	12.43%	▼11.06	18.94%	▲9.03	Did not contest		2.95%	▲1.24
Scarborough Southwest	April 13, 2026	69.89%	▲8.41	18.42%	▼12.15	5.96%	▲0.94	Did not contest		2.47%	▲1.09
Terrebonne	April 13, 2026	48.41%	▲9.66	3.34%	▼14.84	0.54%	▼0.24	46.83%	▲8.09	0.42%	▼0.63
Chicoutimi—Le Fjord	August 31, 2026	51.55%	▲20.43	12.58%	▼21.56	1.82%	▲0.13	32.82%	▲1.63	0.69%	▼0.25
Beaches—East York	August 31, 2026	55.84%	▼11.90	15.52%	▼8.02	25.64%	▲18.78	Did not contest		1.75%	▲0.47
North Vancouver—Capilano	August 31, 2026	58.73%	▼1.09	29.17%	▼4.50	3.07%	▼1.17	Did not contest		8.56%	▲6.86
Total		46.90%	▼0.79	27.81%	▼7.98	7.31%	▲2.44	12.25%	▲2.79	2.36%	▲1.10

== August 18, 2025 by-election ==
=== Battle River—Crowfoot ===
A by-election was called in the federal riding of Battle River—Crowfoot, and was held on August 18, 2025, following the resignation of Conservative MP Damien Kurek. Kurek, who secured re-election with over 80% of the vote in the 2025 federal election on April 28, resigned his seat on June 17. This was done to allow Conservative leader Pierre Poilievre an opportunity to return to Parliament through a by-election after he was unseated in the 2025 Canadian federal election.

The writ for the by-election was drawn up on June 30, 2025 with the date of the vote set for August 18 in order to avoid a conflict with Alberta Heritage Day earlier in the month.

Canadian federal by-election, August 18, 2025: Battle River—Crowfoot Resignation of Damien Kurek
Party	Candidate	Votes	%	±%
Conservative	Pierre Poilievre	41,308	80.86	-1.98
Independent	Bonnie Critchley	5,018	9.82	–
Liberal	Darcy Spady	2,095	4.10	-7.57
New Democratic	Katherine Swampy	1,061	2.08	-1.10
United	Grant Abraham	757	1.48	–
People's	Jonathan Bridges	138	0.27	-1.31
Green	Ashley MacDonald	116	0.23	-0.50
Libertarian	Michael Harris	103	0.20	–
Christian Heritage	Jeff Willerton	92	0.18	–
Independent	Sarah Spanier	49	0.10	–
Marijuana	Kenneth Kirk	40	0.08	–
Centrist	Ahmed Hassan	15	0.03	–
Independent	Bert William Westergard	11	0.02	–
Independent	Breccan Zimmer	11	0.02	–
Independent	Dillon Anderson	10	0.02	–
Independent	Nicole Betts	7	0.01	–
Independent	Nickolas Meuters-Murphy	7	0.01	–
Independent	Diane Prentice	7	0.01	–
Independent	Glen Armstrong	6	0.01	–
Independent	Caitlyn Baker	6	0.01	–
Independent	Lisa Parsons	6	0.01	–
Independent	Jason Buzzell	5	0.01	–
Independent	Jenny Cartwright	5	0.01	–
Independent	Deborah Chalmers	5	0.01	–
Independent	William Grant	5	0.01	–
Independent	Paul Jones	5	0.01	–
Independent	Brennen Perry	5	0.01	–
Independent	Anthony Perullo	5	0.01	–
Independent	Myles René Laurent St. Pierre	5	0.01	–
Independent	Fraser Anderson	4	0.01	–
Independent	Rebecca Boyce	4	0.01	–
Independent	Pierre Gauthier	4	0.01	–
Independent	Preston Hoff	4	0.01	–
Independent	Mark Ruthenberg	4	0.01	–
Independent	Ceilidh Stewart	4	0.01	–
Independent	Danica Boe	3	0.01	–
Independent	Aaron Bowles	3	0.01	–
Independent	Sarah Burke	3	0.01	–
Independent	David Cherniak	3	0.01	–
Independent	John Dale	3	0.01	–
Independent	Emily Goose	3	0.01	–
Independent	Corey Hales	3	0.01	–
Independent	Grace Pender	3	0.01	–
Independent	Noah Reid	3	0.01	–
Independent	David Sader	3	0.01	–
Independent	Molly Sun	3	0.01	–
Independent	Nicola Zoghbi	3	0.01	–
Independent	Alex Banks	2	0.00	–
Independent	Stacy Lynn Billingsley	2	0.00	–
Independent	Marten Borch	2	0.00	–
Independent	Jakeb Brown	2	0.00	–
Independent	Annelies Cooper	2	0.00	–
Independent	Hannah DeWolfe	2	0.00	–
Independent	Elizabeth Dupuis	2	0.00	–
Independent	Kenneth Durham	2	0.00	–
Independent	Michael Dyck	2	0.00	–
Independent	Katherine Dyson	2	0.00	–
Independent	Michael Louis Fitzgerald	2	0.00	–
Independent	Daniel Gagnon	2	0.00	–
Independent	Kerri Hildebrandt	2	0.00	–
Independent	Elsie Kipp	2	0.00	–
Independent	Chris Kowalchuk	2	0.00	–
Independent	Johnson Hon Wa Lee	2	0.00	–
Independent	Maria Light	2	0.00	–
Independent	Derek Adam MacKay	2	0.00	–
Independent	Jeffrey McLean	2	0.00	–
Independent	Riley Moss	2	0.00	–
Independent	Kimberley Nugent	2	0.00	–
Independent	Alexander Panchuk	2	0.00	–
Independent	Yagya Parihar	2	0.00	–
Independent	Samuel Pignedoli	2	0.00	–
Independent	Lorant Polya	2	0.00	–
Independent	Jayson Roy	2	0.00	–
Independent	Adam Smith	2	0.00	–
Independent	Patrick Strzalkowski	2	0.00	–
Independent	Callan Wassenaar	2	0.00	–
Independent	Jeremy Wedel	2	0.00	–
Independent	Hazel Westwood	2	0.00	–
Independent	Nicholas Ashmore	1	0.00	–
Independent	Michael Bednarski	1	0.00	–
Independent	Lilia Boisvert	1	0.00	–
Independent	Alain Bourgault	1	0.00	–
Independent	Eva Bowering	1	0.00	–
Independent	Joshua Brauner	1	0.00	–
Independent	Alexandre Brochu	1	0.00	–
Independent	Chun Chen	1	0.00	–
Independent	Shawn Clendining	1	0.00	–
Independent	Lindsay Elaine Shyla Colosimo	1	0.00	–
Independent	Dylan Colquhoun	1	0.00	–
Independent	Jayson Cowan	1	0.00	–
Independent	Michael Davis	1	0.00	–
Independent	Geneviève Dorval	1	0.00	–
Independent	Jordan Drew	1	0.00	–
Independent	Murray Dunham	1	0.00	–
Independent	Eric Duong	1	0.00	–
Independent	Mark Eccleston	1	0.00	–
Independent	Jeremy Edwards	1	0.00	–
Independent	Allison Fanjoy	1	0.00	–
Independent	Gabriel Finn	1	0.00	–
Independent	Hubert Fischer	1	0.00	–
Independent	Matthew Gillies	1	0.00	–
Independent	Peter Gorman	1	0.00	–
Independent	Jacqueline Grabowski	1	0.00	–
Independent	Andrew Guenther	1	0.00	–
Independent	Blake Hamilton	1	0.00	–
Independent	Jason Hodgson	1	0.00	–
Independent	Dakota Hourie	1	0.00	–
Independent	Uneeb Islam	1	0.00	–
Independent	Michael Jones	1	0.00	–
Independent	Richard Kenkel	1	0.00	–
Independent	Madison Kennedy	1	0.00	–
Independent	Abraham Lau	1	0.00	–
Independent	Charles Lemieux	1	0.00	–
Independent	Robert Marsden	1	0.00	–
Independent	Agnieszka Marszalek	1	0.00	–
Independent	Geoffrey Meens	1	0.00	–
Independent	Sophia Nguyen	1	0.00	–
Independent	Pascal Noël	1	0.00	–
Independent	Steve Oates	1	0.00	–
Independent	Lény Painchaud	1	0.00	–
Independent	Lanna Palsson	1	0.00	–
Independent	Céline Paquin	1	0.00	–
Independent	Meagan Roberge	1	0.00	–
Independent	Melanie Roberge	1	0.00	–
Independent	Mark Russell	1	0.00	–
Independent	Kayll Schaefer	1	0.00	–
Independent	Hakim Sheriff	1	0.00	–
Independent	Eric Shorten	1	0.00	–
Independent	Bradley Stewart	1	0.00	–
Independent	Mário Stocco	1	0.00	–
Independent	Faith Tabladillo	1	0.00	–
Independent	Alex Vallée	1	0.00	–
Independent	Dennis Vanmeer	1	0.00	–
Independent	Bryan Wang	1	0.00	–
Independent	Joshua Wong	1	0.00	–
Independent	Yao ZhangLi	1	0.00	–
Independent	David Zhu	1	0.00	–
Independent	Barry Zukewich	1	0.00	–
Independent	Marthalee Aykroyd	0	0.00	–
Independent	Line Bélanger	0	0.00	–
Independent	Michel Bélanger	0	0.00	–
Independent	Jeani Boudreault	0	0.00	–
Independent	Jeffery Brazeau	0	0.00	–
Independent	Bo Cai	0	0.00	–
Independent	Cameron Campos	0	0.00	–
Independent	Nicolas Champagne	0	0.00	–
Independent	Jaël Champagne Gareau	0	0.00	–
Independent	Claude Cordon Pichilla	0	0.00	–
Independent	Tristan Dell	0	0.00	–
Independent	Gerrit Dogger	0	0.00	–
Independent	Abel Erazo-Ibarra	0	0.00	–
Independent	Tracy Farber	0	0.00	–
Independent	Brian Farrenkopf	0	0.00	–
Independent	Thomas Fitzgerald	0	0.00	–
Independent	Connor Fullerton	0	0.00	–
Independent	Jordan Gerrard	0	0.00	–
Independent	Eric Gilmour	0	0.00	–
Independent	Laurie Goble	0	0.00	–
Independent	David Patrick Greene	0	0.00	–
Independent	Nicolette Gross	0	0.00	–
Independent	Kathleen Gudmundsson	0	0.00	–
Independent	Richard Haley	0	0.00	–
Independent	Kazimir Haykowsky	0	0.00	–
Independent	Iriella Hicks	0	0.00	–
Independent	Loren Hicks	0	0.00	–
Independent	Seyed Hosseini Lavasani	0	0.00	–
Independent	Glendyn Howse	0	0.00	–
Independent	Ryan Huard	0	0.00	–
Independent	Jack Jean-Louis	0	0.00	–
Independent	Derek Jouppi	0	0.00	–
Independent	Erich Jurgens	0	0.00	–
Independent	Elza Kephart	0	0.00	–
Independent	Dannielle Konkle	0	0.00	–
Independent	Solomon Krygier-Paine	0	0.00	–
Independent	Andrew Kulas	0	0.00	–
Independent	Samuel Lafontaine	0	0.00	–
Independent	Alain Lamontagne	0	0.00	–
Independent	Eric Laverdure	0	0.00	–
Independent	Jocelyn LeBlanc-Courchaine	0	0.00	–
Independent	Alexander Lein	0	0.00	–
Independent	Renée Lemieux	0	0.00	–
Independent	Jeffrey Leroux	0	0.00	–
Independent	Litma Kai Ching Leung	0	0.00	–
Independent	Cedric Ludlow	0	0.00	–
Independent	Jennifer Margaret Mackenzie-Miller	0	0.00	–
Independent	Nicolas Maltais	0	0.00	–
Independent	Kevin Manzano	0	0.00	–
Independent	Eric March	0	0.00	–
Independent	Devin McManus	0	0.00	–
Independent	Robert Melting Tallow	0	0.00	–
Independent	Joanne L Metters	0	0.00	–
Independent	Nicholas Mew	0	0.00	–
Independent	Mark Moutter	0	0.00	–
Independent	Rob Mumford	0	0.00	–
Independent	Molly Munn	0	0.00	–
Independent	Sam Nabi	0	0.00	–
Independent	John Francis O'Flynn	0	0.00	–
Independent	Clifford Pine	0	0.00	–
Independent	Brian Ramchandar	0	0.00	–
Independent	Spencer Rocchi	0	0.00	–
Independent	Wallace Richard Rowat	0	0.00	–
Independent	Barry Rueger	0	0.00	–
Independent	Chris Scrimes	0	0.00	–
Independent	Charles Douglas Sleep	0	0.00	–
Independent	Julie St-Amand	0	0.00	–
Independent	Pascal St-Amand	0	0.00	–
Independent	Andi Sweet	0	0.00	–
Independent	Corinne Unrau	0	0.00	–
Independent	Tyson Warner	0	0.00	–
Independent	Simon John Edwin Wedel	0	0.00	–
Independent	Michaiah Williams	0	0.00	–
Independent	Brian Wishart	0	0.00	–
Independent	Michael Wisniewski	0	0.00	–
Independent	Belinda Christine Young	0	0.00	–
Total valid votes		51,085	99.59	–
Total rejected ballots		211	0.41	-0.19
Turnout		51,296	59.83	-16.66
Eligible voters		85,736	–	
Conservative hold		Swing		–
Source: Elections Canada

== April 13, 2026 by-elections ==
Nominations closed on March 23, at 2 pm local time.

=== University—Rosedale ===
A by-election was held in the federal riding of University—Rosedale in Ontario, Canada, following the January 9, 2026, resignation of incumbent Liberal MP Chrystia Freeland due to her accepting a position as economic advisor to the Office of the President of Ukraine.

The Chief Electoral Officer of Canada received formal notification of the vacancy from the Speaker of the House of Commons of Canada on January 9, 2026. The date of the by-election must be announced between January 20 and July 8, 2026. The by-election must be held on a Monday, at least 36 days but no more than 50 days after the day the by-election is announced. Accordingly, the earliest date that University—Rosedale by-election could have been held was March 2, 2026.

The Liberals announced Danielle Martin as their candidate on January 31.

Serena Purdy, the NDP candidate in this riding in the 2025 federal election, announced on March 3 that she would be the party's candidate.

The Greens announced candidate Andrew Massey on February 12.

Independent Adam Golding announced his candidacy in mid-February; he previously finished last in the riding in the 2025 federal election. He did not end up registering as a candidate, however.

The Centrist Party announced Imran Khan as their candidate on February 16; Khan previously ran in Scarborough Southwest in the 2025 federal election.

The Conservatives announced Don Hodgson as their candidate on March 11.

Martin was elected, holding this seat for the Liberals. Her victory, the first out of the three by-elections called on the night, took the Liberals to Majority Government status.

Canadian federal by-election, April 13, 2026: University—Rosedale Resignation of Chrystia Freeland
Party	Candidate	Votes	%	±%
Liberal	Danielle Martin	19,961	64.33	+0.33
New Democratic	Serena Purdy	5,870	18.92	+9.02
Conservative	Don Hodgson	3,852	12.41	-11.08
Green	Andrew Massey	915	2.95	+1.24
People's	Andy D’Andrea	206	0.66	–
Centrist	Imran Khan	66	0.21	–
Canadian Future	Samuel Baxter	55	0.18	–
Independent	Raiden DeDominicis	45	0.15	–
Independent	Bill Whatcott	36	0.12	–
No Affiliation	Leslie Bory	22	0.07	–
Total valid votes		31,028		
Total rejected ballots		87		
Turnout		31,115	33.11	-32.34
Eligible voters		93,971		
Liberal hold		Swing		-4.32
Source: Elections Canada

=== Scarborough Southwest ===
A by-election was held in the federal riding of Scarborough Southwest in Ontario, Canada, following the announced resignation of incumbent Liberal MP Bill Blair on February 2, 2026.

The Chief Electoral Officer of Canada received formal notification of the vacancy from the Speaker of the House of Commons of Canada on February 2, 2026. The date of the by-election must be announced between February 13 and August 1, 2026. The by-election must be held on a Monday, at least 36 days but no more than 50 days after the day the by-election is announced. Accordingly, the earliest date that the Scarborough Southwest by-election could be held is March 23, 2026.

The Liberals announced then–Ontario NDP deputy leader and MPP Doly Begum as their candidate on February 3.

The New Democratic Party ran Fatima Shaban, who was also the party's candidate in 2025.

The Greens announced Pooja Malhotra as their candidate on February 12.

The Centrist Party announced Lyall Sanders as their candidate on February 21.

Begum was elected, holding this seat for the Liberals.

Canadian federal by-election, April 13, 2026: Scarborough Southwest Resignation of Bill Blair
Party	Candidate	Votes	%	±%
Liberal	Doly Begum	20,121	69.60	+8.12
Conservative	Diana Filipova	5,433	18.79	–11.77
New Democratic	Fatima Shaban	1,714	5.92	+0.92
Green	Pooja Malhotra	711	2.46	+1.08
Independent	April Francisco	422	1.50	N/A
People's	Peter Koubakis	265	0.92	-0.12
Christian Heritage	David Vedova	143	0.49	N/A
Centrist	Lyall Sanders	100	0.35	+0.04
Total valid votes		28,909		
Total rejected ballots		89		
Turnout		28,998	33.80	–29.52
Eligible voters		85,796		
Liberal hold		Swing		+8.12
Source: Elections Canada

=== Terrebonne ===
A by-election was held in the federal riding of Terrebonne in Quebec, Canada, after the Supreme Court of Canada, on February 13, 2026, reversed a lower court ruling denying an appeal by a Bloc Québécois candidate, who lost the federal election in Terrebonne riding by a single vote, vacating the seat won by Liberal MP Tatiana Auguste and triggering a byelection. The annulment was due to a printing error by Elections Canada on a return envelope for mail-in ballots which resulted in an envelope containing a vote for the Bloc Québécois candidate being returned to sender after the election.

Auguste was elected by an increased margin according to preliminary results, holding this seat for the Liberals.

Canadian federal by-election, April 13, 2026: Terrebonne 2025 result annulled by Supreme Court
Party	Candidate	Votes	%	±%
Liberal	Tatiana Auguste	22,445	48.32	+9.59
Bloc Québécois	Nathalie Sinclair-Desgagné	21,777	46.89	+8.15
Conservative	Adrienne Charles	1,548	3.33	-14.85
New Democratic	Maxime Beaudoin	248	0.53	-2.05
Green	Benjamin Rankin	194	0.42	-0.63
People's	Maria Cantore	113	0.24	-0.47
Rhinoceros	Mark Moutter	61	0.13	–
Independent	Julie St-Amand	7	0.02	–
Independent	Nicolas Champagne	5	0.01	–
Independent	Geneviève Dorval	4	0.01	–
Independent	Myriam Beaulieu	3	0.01	–
No Affiliation	Sébastien CoRhino	3	0.01	–
Independent	Samuel Pignedoli	3	0.00	–
Independent	Myles René Laurent St. Pierre	3	0.01	–
Independent	Alex Banks	2	0.00	–
Independent	Sophia Bearden	2	0.00	–
Independent	Samuel Ducharme	2	0.00	–
Independent	Elizabeth Dupuis	2	0.00	–
Independent	Laurie Goble	2	0.00	–
Independent	Seyed Hosseini Lavasani	2	0.00	–
Independent	Ryan Huard	2	0.00	–
Independent	Krzysztof Krzywinski	2	0.00	–
Independent	Bryan Wang	2	0.00	–
Independent	Danica Boe	1	0.00	–
Independent	Jenny Cartwright	1	0.00	–
Independent	Jaël Champagne Gareau	1	0.00	–
Independent	Jayson Cowan	1	0.00	–
Independent	Michael Dyck	1	0.00	–
Independent	Anthony Hamel	1	0.00	–
Independent	Chris Kowalchuk	1	0.00	–
Independent	John Francis O'Flynn	1	0.00	–
Independent	Spencer Rocchi	1	0.00	–
Independent	Pascal St-Amand	1	0.00	–
Independent	Vivian Unger	1	0.00	–
Independent	Jeani Boudreault	0	0.00	–
Independent	Gerrit Dogger	0	0.00	–
Independent	Ysack Dupont	0	0.00	–
Independent	Alexandra Engering	0	0.00	–
Independent	Emily Goose	0	0.00	–
Independent	Kazimir Haykowsky	0	0.00	–
Independent	Jack Jean-Louis	0	0.00	–
Independent	Joseph Alain Matthew Laveault	0	0.00	–
Independent	Jocelyn LeBlanc-Courchaine	0	0.00	–
Independent	Lanna Palsson	0	0.00	–
Independent	Lajos Polya	0	0.00	–
Independent	Kayll Schaefer	0	0.00	–
Independent	Justin Steinburg	0	0.00	–
Independent	Alon Weinberg	0	0.00	–
Total valid votes/expense limit		46,443		
Total rejected ballots		371		
Turnout		46,814	51.25	-16.68
Eligible voters		91,344		
Liberal hold		Swing		+0.72
Source: Elections Canada

== August 31, 2026 by-elections ==
Three federal by-elections were held on August 31, 2026, in Beaches—East York, Chicoutimi—Le Fjord, and North Vancouver—Capilano. The Liberals won all three contests, retaining Beaches—East York and North Vancouver—Capilano and gaining Chicoutimi—Le Fjord from the Conservatives. Nominations closed on August 10, 2026, and Elections Canada subsequently published the complete lists of confirmed candidates.

=== North Vancouver—Capilano ===
A by-election was held in North Vancouver—Capilano following Liberal MP Jonathan Wilkinson's appointment as Canadian ambassador to the European Union. Wilkinson had held the seat since the 2015 Canadian federal election. Liberal candidate Braeden Caley, a former deputy chief of staff to Prime Minister Mark Carney, won the by-election, defeating Conservative candidate Stephen Curran.

The Conservative Party nominated Curran, a transactional lawyer who had previously been the party's candidate in the riding in the 2025 Canadian federal election. Caley was selected as the Liberal candidate. The NDP nominated community activist Stephen Tweedale. The Green Party nominated environmental scientist Shelley Luce. The People's Party of Canada nominated Ehsan Arjmand, who had been its candidate in the riding in 2025. Jeff Monds ran as an independent candidate affiliated with the Libertarian Party of Canada, which had been deregistered in March 2026.

Canadian federal by-election, August 31, 2026: North Vancouver—Capilano Resignation of Jonathan Wilkinson
Party	Candidate	Votes	%	±%
Liberal	Braeden Caley	23,739	58.73	–1.09
Conservative	Stephen Curran	11,791	29.17	–4.50
Green	Shelley Luce	3,461	8.56	+6.86
New Democratic	Stephen Tweedale	1,242	3.07	–1.17
People's	Ehsan Arjmand	133	0.33	–0.07
Independent	Jeff Monds	51	0.13	—
Total valid votes		40,421		
Total rejected ballots		179		
Turnout		40,654	45.60	-26.05
Eligible voters		89,154		
Liberal hold		Swing		+1.63
Source: Elections Canada

=== Beaches—East York ===
A by-election was held in Beaches—East York following Liberal MP Nate Erskine-Smith's resignation from Parliament, effective July 7, 2026. Liberal candidate Tanveer Shahnawaz, Erskine-Smith's former constituency office manager, won the by-election.

Shahnawaz won the Liberal nomination on July 18, 2026, defeating three other candidates.

On July 29, 2026, the Conservative Party announced Jim Syrbos, co-owner of a local coffee shop, as its candidate.

On July 30, 2026, the NDP announced that labour activist Shannon Devine, who had been the party's candidate in the riding in the 2025 federal election, was its candidate.

On July 30, 2026, the Green Party announced former TTC bus driver, investigative reporter, television producer, and author Bruce Livesey as its candidate.

On July 31, 2026, the People's Party of Canada announced small business owner and licensed financial professional Michel Lachance as its candidate.

The Canadian Future Party ran Cameron Thomas, a communications strategist who served as the party's chief of staff and press secretary.

Canadian federal by-election, August 31, 2026: Beaches—East York Resignation of Nate Erskine-Smith
Party	Candidate	Votes	%	±%
Liberal	Tanveer Shahnawaz	18,504	55.84	-11.90
New Democratic	Shannon Devine	8,496	25.64	+18.78
Conservative	Jim Syrbos	5,142	15.52	-8.02
Green	Bruce Livesey	581	1.75	+0.47
People's	Michel Lachance	249	0.75	—
Canadian Future	Cameron Thomas	165	0.50	—
Total valid votes		33,137		
Total rejected ballots		111		
Turnout		33,248	40.82	-31.12
Eligible voters		81,460		
Liberal hold		Swing		-15.51
Source: Elections Canada

=== Chicoutimi—Le Fjord ===
A by-election was held in Chicoutimi—Le Fjord following Conservative MP Richard Martel's appointment to the Senate. Martel resigned as an MP and left the Conservative caucus on July 7, 2026. Liberal candidate Daniel Gobeil won the by-election, gaining the seat from the Conservatives.

The Conservative candidate was retired attorney and Cégep de Chicoutimi law professor Régis Gaudreault. The Bloc Québécois nominated Caroline Dubé, former director of MP Mario Simard's constituency office.

The Liberals nominated Gobeil, a dairy farmer in La Baie, Quebec, vice-president of Dairy Farmers of Canada, and president of Les Producteurs de lait du Québec.

The NDP nominated Raphaël Émond, who had run for the party in the riding in the 2025 federal election.

The Green Party candidate was Nathe Perrone, the party's Animal Welfare and Security critic.

The People's Party of Canada candidate was entrepreneur François Sabourin. He had been the PPC candidate in the riding in the 2025 federal election and the Parti populaire candidate in the 2026 Chicoutimi provincial by-election.

Canadian federal by-election, August 31, 2026: Chicoutimi—Le Fjord Resignation of Richard Martel
Party	Candidate	Votes	%	±%
Liberal	Daniel Gobeil	16,333	51.55	+20.43
Bloc Québécois	Caroline Dubé	10,397	32.82	+1.63
Conservative	Régis Gaudreault	3,985	12.58	-21.56
New Democratic	Raphaël Émond	577	1.82	–0.13
Green	Nathe Perrone	218	0.69	-0.25
People's	François Sabourin	171	0.54	-0.13
Total valid votes		31,681		
Total rejected ballots		363		
Turnout		32,044	42.96	-25.58
Eligible voters		74,952		
Liberal gain from Conservative		Swing		+20.91
Source: Elections Canada

== December 7, 2026 by-elections ==
=== Saint-Hyacinthe—Bagot—Acton ===
A by-election is pending in Saint-Hyacinthe—Bagot—Acton due to former Bloc Québécois MP Simon-Pierre Savard-Tremblay being announced as the Parti Québécois candidate in Saint-Hyacinthe for the 2026 Quebec general election. In the interim, Savard-Tremblay left the federal BQ caucus to sit as an independent MP and resigned his seat prior to the provincial election. Savard-Tremblay had held the seat for the Bloc since the 2019 Canadian federal election.

On July 16, 2026, the Bloc Québécois selected Caroline Émond to be the candidate. She is the former Quebec delegate-general to the European institutions in Brussels and former executive director of the International Dairy Federation.

On August 21, 2026, it was announced that former Montreal Alouettes player and coach Luc Brodeur-Jourdain would be the candidate for the Conservatives.

On October 22, 2026, the Liberals announced that Chantal Soucy, the former Coalition Avenir Québec MNA for Saint-Hyacinthe would be their candidate.

The Green Party of Canada nominated 2025 candidate in the riding, Martin Grenier on October 30, 2026.

On October 31, 2026, the NDP announced Mathieu Boisvert as their candidate.

Canadian federal by-election, December 7, 2026: Saint-Hyacinthe—Bagot—Acton Resignation of Simon-Pierre Savard-Tremblay
The by-election will be held on December 7, 2026.
Party	Candidate	Votes	%	±%
Bloc Québécois	Caroline Emond			
Liberal	Chantal Soucy			
Conservative	Luc Brodeur-Jourdain			
New Democratic	Mathieu Boisvert			
Green	Martin Grenier			
People's	Joanne Voyer			
Total valid votes				
Total rejected ballots				
Turnout				
Eligible voters		84,439		
Note:The Bloc Québécois won the seat in the 2025 general election, but Savard-Tremblay resigned from the caucus and sat as an independent MP on May 28, 2026.
Source: Elections Canada

=== Scarborough North ===
A by-election is pending in Scarborough North due to Liberal MP Shaun Chen resigning on August 15 citing injuries he sustained in a car accident while he was commuting to Ottawa in the fall of 2025.

The Liberal Party selected Chartered Professional Accountant and community advocate James Li as its candidate on October 29, 2026.

The Conservative candidate is Dameon Halstead.

The NDP nominated Kingsley Kwok as their candidate for the by-election. Kwok is a respiratory therapist at Scarborough General Hospital and sits on the executive board of the Ontario Public Service Employees Union.

The Green Party will run Vicki Jewt, Green Party of Ontario candidate in Scarborough—Rouge Park in the 2025 Ontario election.

Canadian federal by-election, December 7, 2026: Scarborough North Resignation of Shaun Chen
The by-election will be held on December 7, 2026.
Party	Candidate	Votes	%	±%	Expenditures
Liberal	James Li				
Conservative	Dameon Halstead				
New Democratic	Kingsley Kwok				
Green	Victoria Drisana Jewt				
Centrist	Ayub Sipra				
Total valid votes/expense limit					
Total rejected ballots					
Turnout					
Eligible voters		78,591			
Source: Elections Canada

=== Rosemont—La Petite-Patrie ===
A by-election is pending in Rosemont—La Petite-Patrie following New Democratic Party (later independent) MP Alexandre Boulerice resigning his seat officially on August 26, 2026 to run in the 2026 Quebec general election as the Québec solidaire candidate in Gouin. Upon announcing his resignation plans, Boulerice left the federal NDP caucus to sit as an independent MP. Boulerice had held the seat for the NDP since the 2011 Canadian federal election and was the sole NDP MP elected in Quebec in 2025.

The NDP intends to run unemployment activist Pierre Céré in the riding, after he won the nomination contest on July 16, 2026.

On June 18, 2026, Bloc Québécois leader Yves-François Blanchet announced the party's candidate would be Alexandre Curzi, UDA executive and son of actor and politician Pierre Curzi.

On October 22, 2026, the Liberals announced that Jean-Sébastien Vallée, a human rights activist who was the 2025 candidate for the party in the riding would be the candidate once again.

The Conservative candidate is Osmar Llanos Martinez.

Canadian federal by-election, December 7, 2026: Rosemont—La Petite-Patrie Resignation of Alexandre Boulerice (August 25, 2026)
The by-election will be held on December 7, 2026.
Party	Candidate	Votes	%	±%
New Democratic	Pierre Céré			
Liberal	Jean-Sébastien Vallée			
Bloc Québécois	Alexandre Curzi			
Conservative	Osmar Llanos Martinez			
Green	Yahia Ghzala			
Centrist	Ingénieur Hu			
Rhinoceros	François Tessier			
No Affiliation	Philippe Tessier			
Total valid votes				
Total rejected ballots				
Turnout				
Eligible voters				
Note: The New Democratic Party won the seat in the 2025 general election, but Boulerice resigned from the caucus and sat as an independent MP on April 27, 2026.
Source: Elections Canada

=== Laurier—Sainte-Marie ===
A by-election is pending in Laurier—Sainte-Marie due to Liberal MP and former cabinet minister Steven Guilbeault's resignation, which took effect on August 31, 2026. Guilbeault had held the seat since the 2019 Canadian federal election. The NDP intends to run Nimâ Machouf in the riding; she previously ran in the 2019, 2021, and 2025 federal elections. On October 25, 2026, Yves-François Blanchet announced Zumretay Arkin, the former vice president of the World Uyghur Congress, as the Bloc Québéecois candidate. On October 31, 2026, Guy Cormier was announced as the Liberal candidate. He is the former CEO of the Desjardins Group. The Conservatives are running Mathieu Fournier.

Canadian federal by-election, December 7, 2026: Laurier—Sainte-Marie Resignation of Steven Guilbeault
The by-election will be held on December 7, 2026.
Party	Candidate	Votes	%	±%
Liberal	Guy Cormier			
New Democratic	Nimâ Machouf			
Bloc Québécois	Zumretay Arkin			
Conservative	Mathieu Fournier			
People's	Eugène Duplessis			
Rhinoceros	Chinook Blais-Leduc			
Independent	Jocelyn Simon Daigle			
Independent	Jean Duval			
Total valid votes				
Total rejected ballots				
Turnout				
Eligible voters				
Source: Elections Canada

=== Yorkton—Melville ===
A by-election is pending in Yorkton—Melville due to Conservative MP Cathay Wagantall resigning her seat effective August 31, 2026. She was first elected in 2015 and was serving her fourth consecutive term in office.

Previously, Wagantall had announced on July 28, 2025 that she would not be seeking re-election in the next election, but would remain an MP until then.

Yorkton business owner Nelson Pohl had been nominated as the Conservative candidate to succeed Wagantall four days before her announcement on June 13, defeating two other candidates.

On October 29, 2026, the Liberals announced that Yorkton mayor and small business owner Aaron Kienle would be the candidate pending the by-election.

The Green Party of Canada re-nominated Valerie Brooks, their 2025 candidate for the seat.

The New Democratic Party nominated Tammy Bobyk-Jacquemart, a healthcare professional, as its candidate.

Canadian federal by-election, December 7, 2026: Yorkton—Melville Resignation of Cathay Wagantall
The by-election will be held on December 7, 2026.
Party	Candidate	Votes	%	±%	Expenditures
Conservative	Nelson Pohl				
Liberal	Aaron Kienle				
New Democratic	Tammy Bobyk-Jacquemart				
Green	Valerie Brooks				
People's	Dionne Fehler				
Independent	Travis M. Patron				
Total valid votes					
Total rejected ballots					
Turnout					
Eligible voters		56,000			
Source: Elections Canada

=== Brantford—Brant South ===
A by-election is pending in Brantford—Brant South due to Conservative MP Larry Brock's resignation from parliament on September 18, 2026 to accept a position with the crown attorney's office. Brock was first elected in the predecessor riding of Brantford—Brant in the 2021 Canadian federal election and was re-elected in the newly created riding of Brantford—Brant South—Six Nations in the 2025 Canadian federal election.

On September 16, 2026, just two days before his resignation, the riding's name was changed to Brantford—Brant South (French: Brantford—Brant-Sud) from Brantford—Brant South—Six Nations as part of Bill C-25 of the 45th Canadian Parliament.

Brantford mayor Kevin Davis was appointed the Conservative candidate on September 20, 2026.

Former Conservative riding association president Dave Carrol announced his intention to run as an independent on October 28, 2026.

On October 31, 2026, the Liberals announced that Joy O'Donnell, a Certified Financial Planner and the Liberal candidate in the 2025 federal election would be the candidate.

Brad Ward, the Member of Provincial Parliament (MPP) for Brantford from 1990 to 1995 will be the NDP candidate.

The Green candidate is Kathryn Kissinger.

Canadian federal by-election, December 7, 2026: Brantford—Brant South Resignation of Larry Brock
The by-election will be held on December 7, 2026.
Party	Candidate	Votes	%	±%	Expenditures
Conservative	Kevin Davis				
Liberal	Joy O'Donnell				
New Democratic	Brad Ward				
Green	Kathryn Kissinger				
People's	Anthony Tarrant				
Christian Heritage	Dirk Byers				
Independent	Leslie Bory				
Independent	Dave Carrol				
Independent	Mike Clancy				
Total valid votes/expense limit			–		
Total rejected ballots					
Turnout					
Eligible voters					
Source: Elections Canada

== Expected by-elections ==
=== Parry Sound—Muskoka ===
A by-election is expected in Parry Sound—Muskoka due to Conservative MP Scott Aitchison's intention to resign his seat by the end of the year. Following his announcement, he accepted a provincial appointment as District Chair of the Region of Muskoka effective December 1, 2026.

Aitchison had held the seat since the 2019 Canadian federal election. Filmmaker Geordie Sabbagh, the 2025 Liberal candidate, addressed speculation he may run again by saying he is currently focused on his municipal campaign. On October 26, 2026, Sabbagh was elected as a municipal councillor in Huntsville. The Toronto Star ran a story speculating the riding's former MP Tony Clement may run, but Clement declined to comment for the story.
