= 46th Canadian federal election =

Next general election in Canada

- On or before October 15, 2029

343 seats in the House of Commons 172 seats needed for a majority
- Opinion polls

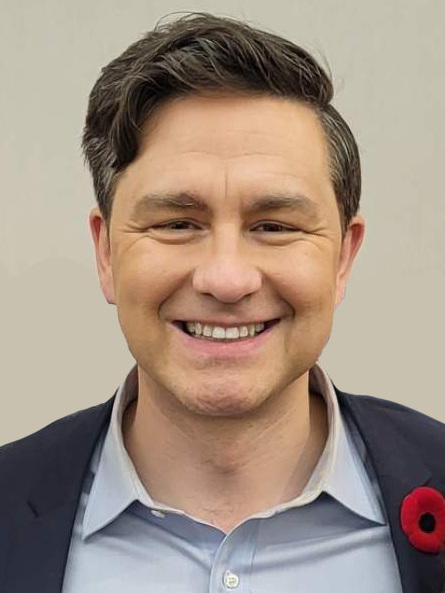

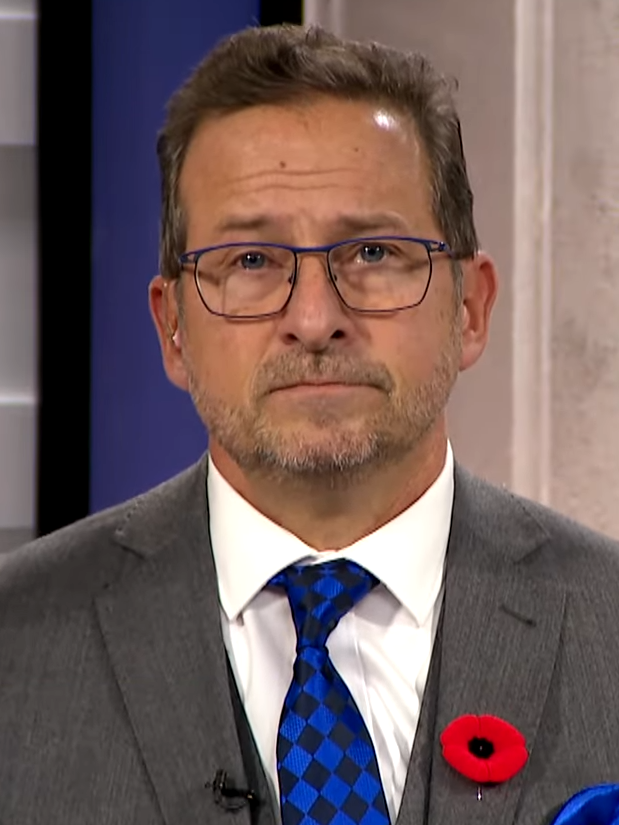

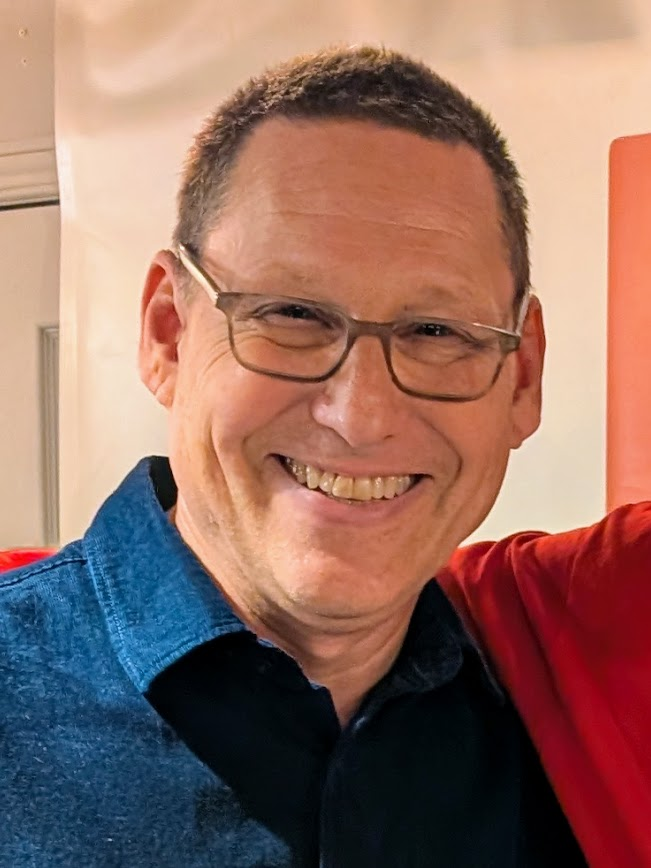

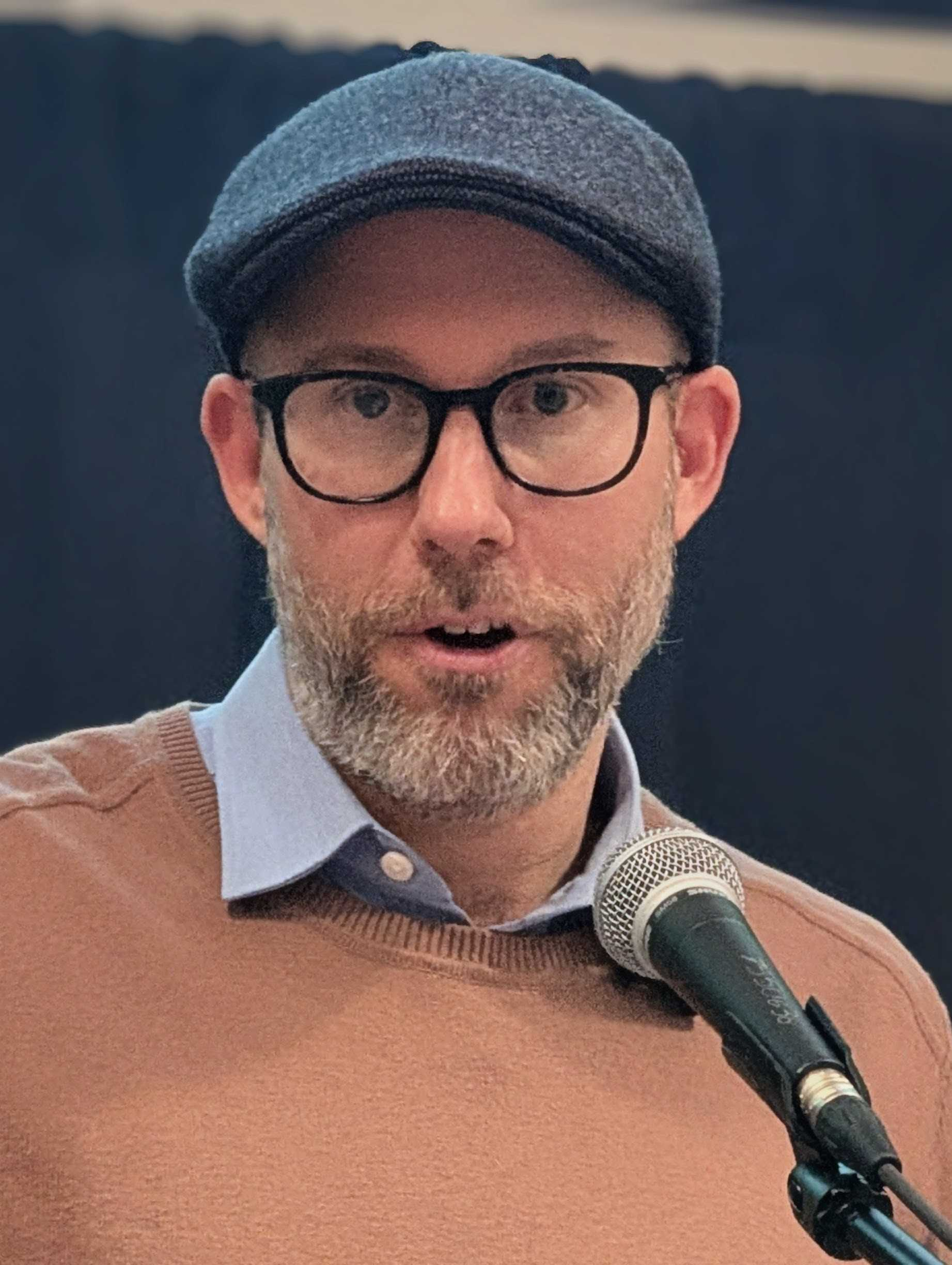
Leader	Mark Carney	Pierre Poilievre	Yves-François Blanchet
Party	Liberal	Conservative	Bloc Québécois
Leader since	March 9, 2025	September 10, 2022	January 17, 2019
Leader's seat	Nepean	Battle River—Crowfoot	Belœil—Chambly
Last election	169 seats, 43.76%	144 seats, 41.31%	22 seats, 6.29%
Current seats	173	137	21
Seats needed	Steady	▲35	N/A (Note: Although parties registered with Elections Canada can field candidates in any riding they wish, the Bloc Québécois has never fielded candidates outside of Quebec (78 seats), thus rendering it impossible for the party to gain a majority in Parliament.)
Leader	Avi Lewis	Mike Morrice
Party	New Democratic	Green
Leader since	March 29, 2026	November 14, 2026
Leader's seat	None	None (Running in Kitchener Centre)
Last election	7 seats, 6.29%	1 seat, 1.22%
Current seats	5	1
Seats needed	▲167	▲171
Incumbent prime minister
Mark Carney
Liberal

The 46th Canadian federal election will elect members of the House of Commons to the 46th Canadian Parliament. Pursuant to the Canada Elections Act, the election is tentatively scheduled for October 15, 2029, but it may be called earlier.

The 2025 Canadian federal election resulted in the formation of a minority government led by Mark Carney. Carney later formed a majority government in April 2026 through by-election wins and floor-crossings.

== Date of the election ==
Under the fixed-date provisions of the Canada Elections Act, a federal election must be held on the third Monday in October in the fourth calendar year after the polling day of the previous election. The previous election was held in 2025, therefore an election is scheduled to take place on October 15, 2029. However, the election may occur before that date if the governor general dissolves Parliament on the recommendation of the prime minister, either for a snap election or after the government loses a vote on a supply bill (which has not happened since 1979) or a specific motion of no confidence (which has not happened since 2011).

== Background ==
In the 2025 Canadian federal election, the incumbent Liberal Party, led by Prime Minister Mark Carney, won a plurality of seats but failed to win enough seats to gain a parliamentary majority, continuing their six-year tenure as a minority government and marking the third consecutive term of a Liberal minority government. Led by Justin Trudeau, the party won a majority government in 2015, after almost ten years of Conservative leadership under Stephen Harper, but later it was reduced to a minority government in the 2019 election and remained as such in 2021.

The Conservative Party continued as the Official Opposition, with party leader Pierre Poilievre losing re-election in his seat of Carleton after nearly 21 years to Liberal candidate Bruce Fanjoy. Damien Kurek, the Conservative member of Parliament–elect for the riding of Battle River—Crowfoot, announced his intentions to resign on May 2, 2025, allowing Poilievre to run in a by-election. Kurek had to wait 30 days after election results were published in the Canada Gazette to resign officially, and plans to run for the Alberta seat again in the next general election. On May 6, Andrew Scheer became the leader of the Official Opposition, the title he had previously held from 2017 to 2020, as Poilievre could not officially hold the title without a seat in Parliament. Poilievre was elected on August 18, returning to the House of Commons.

Jagmeet Singh, the leader of the New Democratic Party, also lost his seat, (Note: Burnaby South, which Singh represented before the election, was abolished during the 2022 Canadian federal electoral redistribution. Singh ran in Burnaby Central, a riding which encompasses much of the same territory.) with the party winning just seven seats, resulting in the loss of the party's official party status for the first time since 1993. It was the worst result in the history of the party, including its predecessor party, the Co-operative Commonwealth Federation. As a result, Singh announced his intention to resign from the leadership of the NDP once an interim leader was chosen. On May 5, Don Davies was chosen by the party's Federal Council as interim leader of the NDP until the next leadership election, which was won by filmmaker and activist Avi Lewis.

Jonathan Pedneault, the co-leader of the Green Party, was not elected to a seat in Parliament, with the party winning just one seat and receiving its lowest share of the popular vote since 2000. As a result, Pedneault announced his resignation as co-leader shortly after the election. On August 19, Elizabeth May announced her intention to resign as party leader.

=== Incumbents not standing for re-election ===
Member of the Legislative Assembly	Electoral district	First elected	Date announced	Ref.
Scott Aitchison	Parry Sound—Muskoka	2019	September 30, 2026	

== Changes in seats held ==
Changes in seats held (2025–present)
Seat	Before			Change			
Seat	Date	Member	Party	Reason	Date	Member	Party
Battle River—Crowfoot	June 17, 2025	Damien Kurek	█ Conservative	Resigned to provide a seat for Pierre Poilievre	August 18, 2025	Pierre Poilievre	█ Conservative
Acadie—Annapolis	November 4, 2025	Chris d'Entremont	█ Conservative	Left to join the Liberal Party caucus			█ Liberal
Markham—Unionville	December 11, 2025	Michael Ma	█ Conservative	Left to join the Liberal Party caucus			█ Liberal
University—Rosedale	January 9, 2026	Chrystia Freeland	█ Liberal	Resigned to become an economic advisor for Ukraine	April 13, 2026	Danielle Martin	█ Liberal
Scarborough Southwest	February 2, 2026	Bill Blair	█ Liberal	Resigned as a member of Parliament to become the Canadian high commissioner to the United Kingdom	April 13, 2026	Doly Begum	█ Liberal
Terrebonne	February 13, 2026	Tatiana Auguste	█ Liberal	2025 election results annulled by the Supreme Court of Canada	April 13, 2026	Tatiana Auguste	█ Liberal
Edmonton Riverbend	February 18, 2026	Matt Jeneroux	█ Conservative	Left to join the Liberal Party caucus			█ Liberal
Nunavut	March 10, 2026	Lori Idlout	█ New Democratic	Left to join the Liberal Party caucus			█ Liberal
Sarnia—Lambton—Bkejwanong	April 8, 2026	Marilyn Gladu	█ Conservative	Left to join the Liberal Party caucus			█ Liberal
Rosemont—La Petite-Patrie	April 27, 2026	Alexandre Boulerice	█ New Democratic	Pending resignation from federal Parliament to run in the 2026 Quebec provincial election for Québec solidaire			█ Independent
Saint-Hyacinthe—Bagot—Acton	May 28, 2026	Simon-Pierre Savard-Tremblay	█ Bloc Québécois	Pending resignation from federal Parliament to run in the 2026 Quebec provincial election for the Parti Québécois			█ Independent
North Vancouver—Capilano	June 19, 2026	Jonathan Wilkinson	█ Liberal	Resigned as a member of Parliament to become the Canadian ambassador to the European Union	August 31, 2026	Braeden Caley	█ Liberal
Saint-Hyacinthe—Bagot—Acton	June 19, 2026	Simon-Pierre Savard-Tremblay	█ Independent	Resigned as a member of Parliament to run in the 2026 Quebec provincial election	December 7, 2026	TBD	█ Vacant
Chicoutimi—Le Fjord	July 7, 2026	Richard Martel	█ Conservative	Resigned as a member of Parliament following appointment to the Senate of Canada	August 31, 2026	Daniel Gobeil	█ Liberal
Beaches—East York	July 7, 2026	Nate Erskine-Smith	█ Liberal	Resigned	August 31, 2026	Tanveer Shahnawaz	█ Liberal
Scarborough North	August 15, 2026	Shaun Chen	█ Liberal	Resigned	December 7, 2026	TBD	█ Vacant
Rosemont—La Petite-Patrie	August 26, 2026	Alexandre Boulerice	█ Independent	Resigned as a member of Parliament to run in the 2026 Quebec provincial election	December 7, 2026	TBD	█ Vacant
Laurier—Sainte-Marie	August 28, 2026	Steven Guilbeault	█ Liberal	Resigned	December 7, 2026	TBD	█ Vacant
Yorkton—Melville	August 31, 2026	Cathay Wagantall	█ Conservative	Resigned	December 7, 2026	TBD	█ Vacant
Brantford—Brant South	September 18, 2026	Larry Brock	█ Conservative	Resigned	December 7, 2026	TBD	█ Vacant

== Timeline ==
=== 2025 ===
- November 4 – Chris d'Entremont resigns from the Conservative caucus and crosses the floor to join the Liberals.
- December 11 – Michael Ma resigns from the Conservative caucus and crosses the floor to join the Liberals.

=== 2026 ===
- January 9 – Chrystia Freeland resigns as a member of Parliament to become an economic advisor for Ukraine.
- January 31 – Pierre Poilievre receives 87.4% support in a leadership review vote during the Conservative Party of Canada convention.
- February 2 – Bill Blair resigns as a member of Parliament to become the Canadian high commissioner to the United Kingdom.
- February 13 – The riding of Terrebonne becomes vacant after the Supreme Court of Canada annuls its 2025 results.
- February 18 – Matt Jeneroux resigns from the Conservative caucus and crosses the floor to join the Liberals.
- March 10 – Lori Idlout resigns from the New Democratic Party caucus and crosses the floor to join the Liberals.
- March 29 – The 2026 New Democratic Party leadership election concludes with Avi Lewis being elected as the new leader of the New Democratic Party.
- April 8 – Marilyn Gladu resigns from the Conservative caucus and crosses the floor to join the Liberals.
- April 13 – Three by-elections take place, resulting in the Liberals attaining a majority in the House of Commons.
- April 27 – Alexandre Boulerice leaves the New Democratic Party caucus to sit as an independent until the Quebec provincial election is called.
- May 28 – Simon-Pierre Savard-Tremblay leaves the Bloc Québécois caucus to sit as an independent until the Quebec provincial election is called.
- June 19 – Jonathan Wilkinson and Simon-Pierre Savard-Tremblay resign as members of Parliament.
- July 7 – Richard Martel and Nate Erskine-Smith resign as members of Parliament, with Martel appointed to the Senate of Canada.
- August 15 – Shaun Chen resigns as a member of Parliament.
- August 26 – Alexandre Boulerice resigns as a member of Parliament.
- August 28 – Steven Guilbeault resigns as a member of Parliament.
- August 31 – Three by-elections take place, resulting in the Liberals growing their majority in the House of Commons.
- September 18 – Larry Brock resigns as a member of Parliament.
- November 14 – Mike Morrice succeeds Elizabeth May as leader of the Green Party of Canada.

== Opinion polls ==
Opinion polling for the 46th Canadian federal election (LOESS diagram)
