= 2026 New Democratic Party of Prince Edward Island leadership election =

Canadian provincial leadership election

- February 7, 2026
Candidate	Thomas Burleigh
Votes	46
leader before election
Vacant
Elected leader
Thomas Burleigh

2026 New Democratic Party of Prince Edward Island leadership election
- Date: February 7, 2026
- Convention: Charlottetown Library Learning Centre, Charlottetown
- Resigning leader: Michelle Neill
- Won by: Thomas Burleigh
- Ballots: 1
- Candidates: 1

In 2026, the New Democratic Party of Prince Edward Island held a leadership election to choose a leader to replace Michelle Neill, who resigned on October 25, 2025. The leadership election took place on the same date as the party's provincial convention. It was held on the same day as the 2026 Progressive Conservative Party of Prince Edward Island leadership election.

The lone candidate, Thomas Burleigh, was unanimously elected on the first ballot with 46 votes.

== Declared ==
- Thomas Burleigh, general manager of Burleigh Bros. Seafoods (Announced: January 26, 2026)

== Withdrawn ==
- Herb Dickieson, MLA West Point-Bloomfield (1996–2000), party leader (1995–2002) (Announced: December 16, 2025; Withdrawn: January 20, 2026)

== See also ==
- 2026 Canadian electoral calendar
- New Democratic Party of Prince Edward Island leadership elections
