= 2027 Parry Sound—Muskoka federal by-election =

Upcoming Canadian federal by-election

Riding of Parry Sound—Muskoka
	CPC	LPC	NDP
Party	Conservative	Liberal	New Democratic
Last election	52.2%	42.6%	3.6%
Incumbent MP
Scott Aitchison
Conservative

A by-election is expected to be held in 2027 in the Ontario federal electoral district of Parry Sound—Muskoka to elect a member of Parliament (MP) to the House of Commons of Canada for the remainder of the 45th Canadian Parliament.

The by-election is expected to follow the resignation of Conservative MP Scott Aitchison, who announced in September 2026 that he intended to leave Parliament by the end of the year. Aitchison subsequently accepted a provincial appointment as regional chair of the District Municipality of Muskoka, effective December 1, 2026.

== Background ==
Aitchison was first elected in the 2019 Canadian federal election, succeeding Tony Clement, who had represented the riding since 2006. A former mayor of Huntsville, Aitchison was also a candidate in the 2022 Conservative Party of Canada leadership election.

In the 2025 Canadian federal election, Aitchison was re-elected with approximately 52.2% of the vote, defeating Liberal candidate Geordie Sabbagh, who received approximately 42.6%. Before Clement's election in 2006, the riding had been represented by Liberal Andy Mitchell.

== Candidates ==
=== Conservatives ===
On November 5, 2026, the Toronto Star reported that former MP Tony Clement was considering seeking the Conservative nomination. Clement declined to comment.

On November 16, 2026, Ian McNaughton, a Gravenhurst businessman who owns three Home Hardware stores, announced that he would seek the Conservative nomination for the by-election.

=== Liberals ===
Geordie Sabbagh, the Liberal candidate in 2025, said in October 2026 that he was focused on his campaign in the municipal election. Sabbagh was elected to Huntsville municipal council on October 26.

== Previous result ==
2025 Canadian federal election: Parry Sound—Muskoka
Party	Candidate	Votes	%	±%	Expenditures
Conservative	Scott Aitchison	33,742	52.2	+4.27	
Liberal	Geordie Sabbagh	27,563	42.6	+21.1	
New Democratic	Heather Hay	2,300	3.6	–13.3	
People's	Isabel Pereira	1,048	1.6	–5.9	
Total valid votes/expense limit		64,653			
Total rejected ballots		353			
Turnout		65,006	71.43		
Eligible voters		91,006			
Source: Elections Canada
