= Canadian Future Party =

Federal political party

Canadian Future Party Parti Avenir Canadien
- Abbreviation: CFP; PAC
- Leader: Dominic Cardy
- Executive director: Julie Smith
- Founders: Dominic Cardy, Rick Peterson
- Founded: September 20, 2023
- Registered: August 8, 2024; 2 years ago
- Split from: Conservative Party of Canada
- Headquarters: Fredericton, New Brunswick
- Youth wing: Canadian Future Party Youth/Aile Jeunesse du Parti Avenir Canadien
- Membership (2024): 1,401
- Ideology: Centrism; Economic liberalism; Social liberalism; Classical liberalism; Canadian nationalism
- Political position: Centre
- Colours: Amber
- Senate: 0 / 105
- House of Commons: 0 / 343

Website
- thecanadianfutureparty.ca

The Canadian Future Party (CFP; Canadian French: Parti avenir canadien, PAC) is a federal political party in Canada that was founded in September 2023 and officially launched in August 2024. It describes itself as being politically centrist, campaigning on a economically liberal and socially liberal platform. The party's founding leader is Dominic Cardy, a former Progressive Conservative cabinet minister in New Brunswick who had previously led the New Brunswick New Democratic Party.

== History ==
The Canadian Future Party emerged from the Centre Ice Conservatives who were co-founded by former Conservative leadership candidate Rick Peterson in April 2022 as a pressure group within the Conservative Party of Canada in the lead up to the 2022 Conservative Party of Canada leadership election. Their aim was to moderate the rightward shift the party was on. Centre-right Conservatives initially included figures such as former BC Liberal premier Christy Clark, former Conservative minister Peter Kent and National Post columnist Tasha Kheiriddin as supporters. The group left the party as a result of the election of Pierre Poilievre as leader and changed its name to Centre Ice Canadians in an attempt to appeal to disaffected Liberals as well as Conservatives.

On September 20, 2023, it was announced that, after months of discussion, the group would be forming a political party to contest elections. Former New Brunswick cabinet minister Dominic Cardy became interim leader of the party. On February 6, 2024, it was announced that Denis Blanchette had joined their national council. He is a former New Democratic Party MP and was the first president of the New Democratic Party of Quebec. The party announced the formation of an internal youth council on February 21, 2024.

The party applied to be registered by Elections Canada and was recognized by the agency as an "eligible party" on July 22, 2024, and became officially registered on August 8, 2024. The party was officially launched at an August 14, 2024 press conference.

In July 2024, interim leader Dominic Cardy was arrested at a pro-Palestinian protest in Toronto for disturbing the peace after chanting "Free Palestine from Hamas".

On July 29, 2024, the party announced its intention to run candidates in the federal by-elections in LaSalle—Émard—Verdun and Elmwood—Transcona scheduled for September 16, 2024. On August 14, 2024, Mark Khoury was announced as the party's candidate for the LaSalle—Émard—Verdun by-election. Zbig Strycharz was later announced as its standard-bearer in Elmwood—Transcona.

The party elected its first leader Dominic Cardy at its founding convention on November 9, 2024. 112 delegates attended the event.

The party's executive director is Cardy's wife, Julie Smith.

== Political positions ==
The party's early stances involved positioning themselves as political centrists while trying to differentiate themselves from the Liberal and Conservative Parties. The party's 'interim policy framework' lists five areas of concern: Personal Freedoms, Open Government, Responsible Spending, Stronger Together (At Home), and Stronger Together (Abroad). In February 2024 interim leader Dominic Cardy held a virtual discussion hosted by CPAC on the topic of Canadian support for Ukraine during which he noted the need for Canada to rebuild Canada's military and foreign relations and criticizing both the Liberal and Conservative Parties.

=== Interim policy framework ===
==== Freedoms ====
- Remaining uninvolved in anything considered a private matter for adult citizens

==== Governance ====
- Electoral reform resulting in mixed-member proportional representation
- Increased public participation in policymaking as part of the legislative process
- Greater transparency by ensuring all public government documents are easily available online
- Improving the timeliness of responses to the public from government offices
- A national internet strategy to protect privacy rights
- The creation of an independent office combatting disinformation
- Combatting abuses of artificial intelligence

==== Fiscal policy ====
- Reform of the civil service to refocus government efforts to where the most impact can be made
- Allowing the private sector to take a larger role in society with government oversight
- Simplifying the tax code to close loopholes in cooperation with the provinces and territories
- Ending corporate subsidies and supply management where a return on investment cannot be delivered
- Improving government procurement based on private sector best practices
- Lowering the national debt

==== Domestic policy ====
- Combatting climate change with carbon capture, nuclear, renewables, and democratically sourced fossil fuels
- Imposing the costs of emissions on large emitters rather than directly on citizens
- Respecting areas of provincial authority and ensuring data is shared on how federal money is used
- Negotiate self-government and resource sharing agreements with First Nations
- Forming a national civil defence corps to handle national disasters and provide opportunities to youth
- Restructuring the RCMP into a domestic intelligence service and leaving policing to the provinces and territories
- Working with the provinces and territories to build housing and direct immigrants to areas they are needed
- Ensuring provinces and territories share data on healthcare spending
- Allowing immigrants qualified in healthcare to be assessed for work within six months
- Investing in scientific research and development to attract Canadian youth and immigrants to tech roles

==== Foreign policy ====
- A comprehensive review of foreign and defence policy
- Supporting an alliance of democracies starting with Australia, New Zealand, and the United Kingdom
- Increase military spending to 2% of GDP to meet NATO goals

=== Russo-Ukrainian War ===
The Canadian Future Party supports the aid granted by the Government of Canada to Ukraine since Russia's full-scale invasion of the country began in February 2022. It has also been critical of the Conservative Party for voting against the Canada–Ukraine Free Trade Agreement over the language on carbon pricing, claiming they sacrificed Ukrainian interests to appease pro-Russian and climate change denying influencers on social media. The Future Party calls for more monetary, diplomatic, and material aid to be given to Ukraine. It also would like to see greater spending on the Canadian Forces to support NATO and other democracies globally, and has expressed discontent with cuts to defence spending by the Liberal Party.

=== Housing ===
Citing forecasts by the Canada Mortgage and Housing Corporation that five million new housing units will be needed by 2030 to meet current needs, the Canadian Future Party has proposed directly involving the federal government in new developments. It proposes first engaging in areas under federal responsibility, such as housing for military bases and government employees, which can take pressure off of local supply. This housing would also prioritize the use of new technologies to minimize their environmental impact. Housing for indigenous communities is also something the party would look into, building off-reserve stock to address their needs.

Furthermore, the party aims to encourage remote work. Ultimatums requiring employees to return to the office are seen as a negative factor in dense urban centres. Flexible workforces are seen as a possible solution to maximizing existing housing stock. The party also sees it as a way to revitalize smaller communities across the country in the process of alleviating large cities.

=== Foreign interference ===
The Canadian Future Party expressed concerns regarding allegations of the Liberal nomination of Han Dong in Don Valley North having been subject to foreign interference. Referring to a report by the Foreign Interference Commission, which stated that nomination contests can be gateways for foreign states wishing to interfere in democratic processes, the following four recommendations were put forward for the party's own operations:

- Only Canadian citizens can become voting members of the Canadian Future Party
- Permanent residents can be engaged but will be given observer status
- Voting members will have to join the party in advance of a nomination to participate
- The disclosure of any candidate's relationship to a foreign power will be required

Bill C-70 has been described by the party as containing many positive elements they have called for. These include the foreign agent registry, new powers for CSIS, and new criminal offences aimed at protecting Canadian institutions. An additional recommendation was made to amend the Elections Act to strengthen oversight over party nominations. Due to the possibility that Bill C-70 may not be in force in time for a future election, it was suggested that Elections Canada create voluntary guidelines for all federal parties to update their nomination processes beforehand.

== Party leadership ==
=== Leaders ===
| Leader | | Term start | Term end | Constituency | Notes |
|---|---|---|---|---|---|
| 1 | Dominic Cardy (b. July 25, 1970) | 20 September 2023 | Incumbent | none | Elected leader at founding convention; previously interim leader from September 20, 2023 – November 9, 2024 |

=== Party presidents ===
- Tara McPhail (2023–2024)

== Election results ==
| Election | Leader | Candidates | Seats won | +/− | Votes | % | Rank | Position | Notes |
|---|---|---|---|---|---|---|---|---|---|
| 2025 | Dominic Cardy | 19 / 343 (6%) | 0 | Steady | 3,123 | 0.02 | 15th | No seats | |

=== By-election results ===
| Date | Candidate | Constituency | Province | Votes | % | ±% | Placement | Win/loss |
|---|---|---|---|---|---|---|---|---|
| September 16, 2024 | Mark Khoury | LaSalle—Émard—Verdun | Quebec | 103 | 0.3% | — | 8/91 | Loss |
| September 16, 2024 | Zbig Strycharz | Elmwood—Transcona | Manitoba | 132 | 0.5% | — | 6/6 | Loss |
| April 13, 2026 | Samuel Baxter | University—Rosedale | Ontario | 56 | 0.2% | — | 7/10 | Loss |
| August 31, 2026 | Cameron Thomas | Beaches—East York | Ontario | 163 | 0.5% | — | 5/5 | Loss |

== See also ==
- Red Tory
- Blue Grit
- Third Way
