= 2026 Chicoutimi—Le Fjord federal by-election =

By-election in Canada

- August 31, 2026

Riding of Chicoutimi—Le Fjord
- Turnout: 42.20% (▼26.34 pp)
	First party	Second party	Third party
	LPC	BQ	CPC
Candidate	Daniel Gobeil	Caroline Dubé	Régis Gaudreault
Party	Liberal	Bloc Québécois	Conservative
Last election	31.12%	31.18%	34.14%
Popular vote	16,235	10,401	3,962
Percentage	51.33%	32.89%	12.53%
Swing	▲20.21 pp	▲1.70 pp	▼21.61 pp
MP before election
Richard Martel (Note: Resigned on July 7, 2026.)
Conservative
Elected MP
Daniel Gobeil
Liberal

A by-election was held on August 31, 2026, to elect a member of Parliament (MP) to represent Chicoutimi—Le Fjord, Quebec, in the House of Commons of Canada for the remainder of the 45th Canadian Parliament following the resignation of Conservative MP Richard Martel.

== Background ==
Conservative MP Richard Martel was first elected to the House of Commons in a 2018 by-election and was re-elected in the 2019, 2021, and 2025 federal elections. He served as Quebec lieutenant under Conservative leader Erin O'Toole and had a fraught relationship with his successor, Pierre Poilievre.

On July 7, 2026, Prime Minister Mark Carney announced that Martel was one of four individuals who would be appointed to the Senate, subject to confirmation of their constitutional qualifications. Martel resigned as member of Parliament for Chicoutimi—Le Fjord on the same date, triggering the by-election.

== Constituency ==
Chicoutimi—Le Fjord is a semi-urban federal riding in the Saguenay–Lac-Saint-Jean region of Quebec, centred on the borough of Chicoutimi within the city of Saguenay. The district includes the communities of Laterrière and Saint-Fulgence, along with the surrounding municipalities of Sainte-Rose-du-Nord, L'Anse-Saint-Jean, Petit-Saguenay, Rivière-Éternité, and Saint-Félix-d'Otis.

== Timing ==
The Chief Electoral Officer received formal notification of the vacancy from the Speaker of the House of Commons on July 10, 2026. The date of the by-election had to be announced between July 20, 2026 and January 5, 2027. The by-election had to be held on a Monday, at least 36 days but no more than 50 days after it was announced. Accordingly, the earliest date the by-election could have been held was August 31, 2026, and the latest was February 22, 2027. On July 26, 2026, the writ was issued for a by-election on August 31, 2026, the earliest possible day.

== Candidates ==
=== Liberal Party ===
On July 24, 2026, the Liberals announced Daniel Gobeil, a dairy farmer in La Baie, as the party's candidate. To run, Gobeil stepped down as president of les Producteurs de lait du Québec and vice-president of Dairy Farmers of Canada. His campaign centered on reassuring agricultural producers and defending the federal supply management system.

Prior to Gobeil's nomination, Stéphane Proulx, the Liberal candidate in the 2025 federal election, had sought the party's nomination. The party also approached Andrée Laforest, former Coalition Avenir Québec cabinet minister and MNA for Chicoutimi, but she declined.

=== Conservative Party ===
On July 26, 2026, the Conservatives announced Régis Gaudreault, a retired attorney and law professor at the Cégep de Chicoutimi, as their candidate. Gaudreault campaigned on tackling the cost of living and criticized Prime Minister Mark Carney for calling a mid-summer by-election.

=== Bloc Québécois ===
The Bloc Québécois nominated Caroline Dubé on July 26, 2026. Dubé served as constituency office director for Mario Simard, the MP for neighbouring Jonquière, since 2019, and was previously the Parti Québécois candidate for Jonquière in the 2022 Quebec general election. Her campaign highlighted sovereignist momentum in the region following the PQ's February 2026 provincial by-election win and criticized Martel's departure for the Senate before the end of his term.

=== Other candidates ===
The New Democratic Party nominated Raphaël Émond, a Laterrière resident who previously contested the riding for the party in 2025. The Green Party candidate is Nathe Perrone, a Montreal resident and the party's animal welfare critic who previously ran in Bourassa in 2021 and Ville-Marie—Le Sud-Ouest—Île-des-Sœurs in 2025.

The People's Party of Canada nominated entrepreneur François Sabourin on July 28, 2026. Sabourin, who lives in Saguenay, previously contested the seat for the PPC in 2025 and ran as the Parti populaire du Québec candidate in the 2026 Chicoutimi provincial by-election. His platform focused primarily on dismantling the supply management system.

== Opinion polling ==
Polling firm	Last date of polling	Link	CPC	BQ	LPC	NDP	GPC	PPC	Others	Undecided	Sample size	Lead
Segma Research	August 2026 (Note: End date is not specified, but concluded after US-Canada trade negotiations were suspended on August 21.)		16.8	37.8	40.3	3.1	0.5	1.5	—	—	448	2.5
Poliwave	August 19, 2026 (Note: Fieldwork was conducted August 16–19, before US–Canada trade negotiations were suspended on August 21.)		15.4	35.1	39.9	6.1	3.1	0.4	—	—	536	4.8
Pallas Data	July 18, 2026		26	30	28	—	—	—	3	13	317	2

== Result ==
Canadian federal by-election, August 31, 2026: Chicoutimi—Le Fjord Resignation of Richard Martel
Party	Candidate	Votes	%	±%
Liberal	Daniel Gobeil	16,333	51.55	+20.43
Bloc Québécois	Caroline Dubé	10,397	32.82	+1.63
Conservative	Régis Gaudreault	3,985	12.58	-21.56
New Democratic	Raphaël Émond	577	1.82	–0.13
Green	Nathe Perrone	218	0.69	-0.25
People's	François Sabourin	171	0.54	-0.13
Total valid votes		31,681		
Total rejected ballots		363		
Turnout		32,044	42.96	-25.58
Eligible voters		74,952		
Liberal gain from Conservative		Swing		+20.91
Source: Elections Canada

== Previous result ==
2025 Canadian federal election: Chicoutimi—Le Fjord
Party	Candidate	Votes	%	±%	Expenditures
Conservative	Richard Martel	17,356	34.14	-6.24	$91,466.24
Bloc Québécois	Marc St-Hilaire	15,857	31.19	-2.88	$44,039.70
Liberal	Stéphane Proulx	15,820	31.12	+12.90	$6,306.74
New Democratic	Raphaël Émond	991	1.95	-2.75	$2,726.02
Green	Yves Laporte	476	0.94	-0.24	$15.96
People's	François Sabourin	339	0.67	-0.70	none listed
Total valid votes/expense limit		50,839	98.60	–	$125,644.80
Total rejected ballots		721	1.40	-0.56	
Turnout		51,560	68.54	+3.89	
Eligible voters		75,229			
Conservative notional hold		Swing		-1.68	
Source: Elections Canada

== See also ==
- By-elections to the 45th Canadian Parliament
- Chicoutimi—Le Fjord
- 2026 North Vancouver—Capilano federal by-election
- 2026 Beaches—East York federal by-election
