= Transactional law =

Area of private law regarding money, business, and commerce

Transactional law is the practice of private law relating to money, business, and commerce. Areas of focus include providing legal aid to entrepreneurs through contract drafting, real estate acquisition, and intellectual property affairs. Transactional law firms differ from traditional litigation firms in that transactional firms generally prefer to resolve disputes out of court.

== See also ==
- Financial transaction
- Transaction cost
- Transaction account
