= 2026 North Vancouver—Capilano federal by-election =

By-election in Canada

- August 31, 2026

Riding of North Vancouver—Capilano
- Turnout: 45.60% (▼26.05)
	First party	Second party	Third party
	LPC	CPC	Grn
Candidate	Braeden Caley	Stephen Curran	Shelley Luce
Party	Liberal	Conservative	Green
Last election	59.83%	33.68%	1.70%
Popular vote	23,805	11,852	3,534
Percentage	58.55%	29.15%	8.69%
Swing	▼1.27	▼4.52	▲6.99
MP before election
Jonathan Wilkinson (Note: Wilkinson resigned his seat on June 19, 2026.)
Liberal
Elected MP
Braeden Caley
Liberal

A by-election was held on August 31, 2026, to elect a member of Parliament (MP) to represent the British Columbia district of North Vancouver—Capilano in the House of Commons for the remainder of the 45th Parliament following the resignation of Liberal MP Jonathan Wilkinson.

== Background ==
=== Early speculation ===
Liberal MP Jonathan Wilkinson had represented the North Shore in the House of Commons since the 2015 Canadian federal election and was re-elected in North Vancouver—Capilano in the 2025 Canadian federal election.

Following Prime Minister Mark Carney's cabinet reshuffle in May 2025, Wilkinson was dropped from Cabinet after serving as a minister for seven years. His departure prompted speculation that he might vacate his seat before the next general election, as political observers noted that former cabinet ministers are often appointed to diplomatic posts.

In a 2025 report, The Hill Times noted that Wilkinson was being considered for diplomatic postings in either Germany or Belgium. Wilkinson said at the time that he intended to continue serving his constituents, indicating that he had not yet decided whether to accept an appointment.

=== Announcement ===
On April 30, 2026, Wilkinson announced that Carney had asked him to serve as Canada's ambassador to the European Union and that he would resign as an MP once a formal transition date had been set. His resignation took effect on June 19, 2026.

== Constituency ==
North Vancouver—Capilano is a suburban riding in the North Shore including the entirety of the City of North Vancouver, part of the District of North Vancouver and the easternmost part of West Vancouver, including Park Royal Shopping Centre, Sentinel Hill and all of Ambleside.

== Timing ==
The chief electoral officer received formal notification of the vacancy from the speaker of the House of Commons on June 22, 2026. The date of the by-election had to be announced between July 3 and December 19, 2026. The by-election had to be held on a Monday, at least 36 days but no more than 50 days after it was announced. Accordingly, the earliest date the by-election could have been held was August 10, 2026, and the latest was February 2, 2027. On July 26, 2026, the writ was issued for a by-election on August 31, 2026. Two other federal by-elections in Chicoutimi—Le Fjord and Beaches—East York will be held on the same day.

== Candidates ==
=== Conservative Party ===
The Conservative Party nominated Stephen Curran, a transactional lawyer and the party's candidate in the 2025 federal election, on March 5, 2026.

=== Liberal Party ===
On July 18, 2026, the Liberals nominated Braeden Caley, deputy chief of staff to Prime Minister Mark Carney, as their candidate. Caley previously served as president and chief executive officer of Canada 2020, a public policy think-tank.

=== New Democratic Party ===
On August 5, 2026, community activist Stephen Tweedale won a contested nomination meeting to become the NDP candidate. Tweedale had served on the local riding association executive and worked as a constituency assistant for North Vancouver-Seymour MLA Susie Chant.

NDP leader Avi Lewis, who does not hold a seat in Parliament and had previously contested the bordering ridings of Vancouver Centre and West Vancouver—Sunshine Coast—Sea to Sky Country, was discussed in media reports as a potential candidate in North Vancouver—Capilano. Lewis ruled out seeking the nomination in May 2026.

=== Other candidates ===
The Green Party nominated environmental scientist and non-profit executive Shelley Luce on July 15, 2026. The People's Party of Canada ran engineer Ehsan Arjmand, who previously contested the riding for the party in 2025.

Jeff Monds ran as an independent candidate affiliated with the unregistered Libertarian Party of Canada, which had been deregistered by Elections Canada in March 2026. Monds previously ran as a Libertarian candidate in Delta—Richmond East in 2011, Pitt Meadows—Maple Ridge—Mission in 2008, and in multiple provincial elections for the British Columbia Libertarian Party.

== Opinion polling ==
Polling firm	Last date of polling	Link	LPC	CPC	NDP	GPC	PPC	Sample size	Lead
Poliwave	August 19, 2026		46.8	30.3	11.9	10.8	0.2	528	16.5

== Result ==
Canadian federal by-election, August 31, 2026: North Vancouver—Capilano Resignation of Jonathan Wilkinson
Party	Candidate	Votes	%	±%
Liberal	Braeden Caley	23,739	58.73	–1.09
Conservative	Stephen Curran	11,791	29.17	–4.50
Green	Shelley Luce	3,461	8.56	+6.86
New Democratic	Stephen Tweedale	1,242	3.07	–1.17
People's	Ehsan Arjmand	133	0.33	–0.07
Independent	Jeff Monds	51	0.13	—
Total valid votes		40,421		
Total rejected ballots		179		
Turnout		40,654	45.60	-26.05
Eligible voters		89,154		
Liberal hold		Swing		+1.63
Source: Elections Canada

== Previous result ==
2025 Canadian federal election: North Vancouver—Capilano
Party	Candidate	Votes	%	±%	Expenditures
Liberal	Jonathan Wilkinson	37,907	59.82	+15.13	$127,665.30
Conservative	Stephen Curran	21,339	33.68	+4.30	$108,928.99
New Democratic	Tammy Bentz	2,684	4.24	–14.82	$37,474.25
Green	Andrew Robinson	1,076	1.70	–2.57	$20,398.54
People's	Ehsan Arjmand	256	0.40	–2.17	$660.53
Independent	Oliver King	102	0.16	–	none listed
Total valid votes/expense limit		63,364	99.39	–	$133,984.48
Total rejected ballots		390	0.61	–0.03	
Turnout		63,754	71.65	+6.98	
Eligible voters		88,977			
Liberal hold		Swing		+5.42	
Source: Elections Canada

== See also ==
- By-elections to the 45th Canadian Parliament
- North Vancouver—Capilano
- 2026 Chicoutimi—Le Fjord federal by-election
- 2026 Beaches—East York federal by-election
