= 2026 University—Rosedale federal by-election =

By-election in Canada

- April 13, 2026

Riding of University—Rosedale
- Turnout: 32.99% (▼32.46 pp)
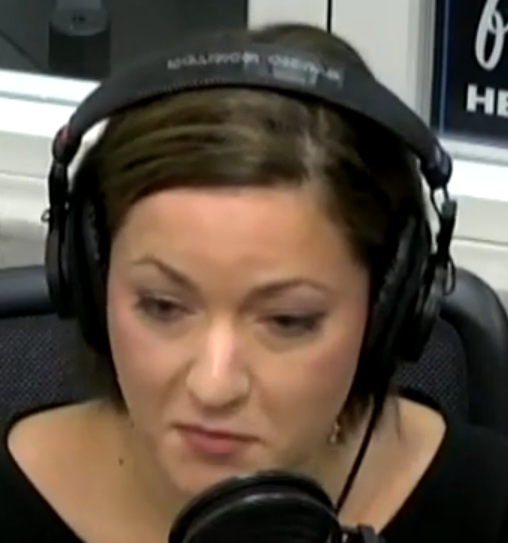
	First party	Second party	Third party
		NDP	CPC
Candidate	Danielle Martin	Serena Purdy	Don Hodgson
Party	Liberal	New Democratic	Conservative
Last election	64.00%	9.91%	23.49%
Popular vote	19,961	5,869	3,843
Percentage	64.39%	18.93%	12.40%
Swing	▲0.39 pp	▲9.03 pp	▼11.09 pp
- Poll by poll map of University-Rosedale in 2025 and 2026
MP before election
Chrystia Freeland
Liberal
Elected MP
Danielle Martin
Liberal

A by-election was held on April 13, 2026, to elect a member of Parliament (MP) to represent University—Rosedale, Ontario, in the House of Commons for the remainder of the 45th Parliament following the resignation of Liberal Party MP Chrystia Freeland. The by-election was won by Danielle Martin, the Liberal Party candidate.

== Background ==
=== Early speculation ===
Following Prime Minister Mark Carney’s cabinet shuffle in September 2025, observers began speculating that Liberal MP Chrystia Freeland might vacate her seat before the next federal election. The reshuffle saw Freeland leave cabinet after more than a decade in senior roles, with Carney naming her to be Special Representative for the Reconstruction of Ukraine.

In her public remarks, Freeland stated that she did not intend to run in the next general election, a signal that she may be preparing to wind down her parliamentary career. Political analysts noted that former senior ministers who transition into international or diplomatic postings often step away from their House seats, either immediately or within the same parliamentary session.

Several outlets reported that Freeland was expected to discuss her future with her riding association, with some suggesting she was considering whether to resign her seat in advance of the next election. Other reporting pointed out that her new Ukraine-focused role would require extensive international engagement, increasing speculation that a by-election would be triggered in her riding if she chose to leave Parliament.

=== Announcement ===
On January 5, 2026, Freeland announced she would resign as Member of Parliament for University—Rosedale in the coming weeks after being appointed an unpaid economic adviser to Ukrainian President Volodymyr Zelenskyy. She also confirmed she would step down as Canada’s Special Representative for the Reconstruction of Ukraine.

Freeland said the decision was prompted by her new advisory role, which will focus on Ukraine’s economic recovery and reconstruction. Prime Minister Mark Carney praised her appointment, citing her experience in economic policy and international affairs.

The announcement drew criticism from Conservative Members of Parliament, who argued that serving as an MP while advising a foreign government constituted a conflict of interest under parliamentary ethics rules. Freeland said she had consulted with the Office of the Conflict of Interest and Ethics Commissioner, which declined to comment due to confidentiality requirements.

On January 7, 2026, Freeland announced that her resignation would take effect on January 9, 2026.

== Timing ==
The Chief Electoral Officer received formal notification of the vacancy from the Speaker of the House of Commons on January 9, 2026. The date of the by-election had to be announced between January 20 and July 8, 2026. The by-election had to be held on a Monday, at least 36 days but no more than 50 days after the day the by-election is announced. Accordingly, the earliest date that the University–Rosedale by-election could have been held was March 2, 2026 and the latest it could have been held is August 24, 2026. On March 8, 2026, the writ was issued for a by-election on April 13, 2026. Nominations closed on March 23.

== Constituency ==
University—Rosedale is an urban riding in central Toronto, encompassing the entire St. George campus of the University of Toronto, as well as the neighbourhoods of Rosedale, Little Italy, The Annex, and Yorkville, along with the northwestern portion of Downtown Toronto.

The seat has been held by the Liberal Party, represented by Chrystia Freeland, since its formation in 2015.

== Candidates ==
=== Liberal Party ===
Speculated Liberal candidates included Toronto based physician and rumoured Ontario Liberal Party leadership candidate Andrew Boozary, former Eglinton—Lawrence MP Marco Mendicino, aviation executive John Tory Jr. (son of former mayor of Toronto and Ontario Progressive Conservative leader John Tory), and former provincial Liberal candidate, and Prosperity Project founder Pamela Jeffery.

RBC executive Andrea Barrick, who was also named as a potential candidate, said she was not interested in the nomination. Investment banker Mark Wiseman was also rumoured to be a prospective candidate for the nomination, but was later appointed as ambassador to United States.

On January 31, 2026, Danielle Martin, family physician and chair of the University of Toronto’s family medicine program, was announced as the party's candidate in the by-election. She previously was courted by Justin Trudeau to run as a Liberal candidate but refused. In 2014, she received attention for testifying in front of the United States Senate defending the Canadian health care system. Her campaign focused around protecting health care and lowering the cost of living.

=== Conservative Party ===
Initially, 2025 federal election candidate for the riding Liz Grade planned on seeking the nomination again. However, the Conservatives nominated Don Hodgson, who works as a mortgage broker. His campaign focused around promises of safer streets, lower taxes, and affordability, which have been the consistent messages of the Conservatives under Pierre Poilievre.

=== New Democratic Party ===
On February 2, 2026, community organizer Serena Purdy, the party's candidate in the 2025 Canadian federal election announced she would be seeking the party's nomination for the by-election. She was subsequently appointed the party's candidate. Purdy was previously the chair of the organization Friends of Kensington Market, and opposed the growing number of short-term Airbnb rentals, which she claimed led to "fewer and fewer permanent neighbours — instead, more combination lock boxes, digital locks and more visitors staying in the area." Purdy is also a health systems academic at the University of Toronto. She supports building more affordable housing and fighting the influence of private equity to solve the housing crisis. She attacked the Carney government as failing to protect universal health care and fight inequities in health care treatment. The NDP campaign also attacked the Liberals for accepting Conservative floor crosser Marilyn Gladu, which Avi Lewis described as having "extreme social conservative views".

=== Green ===
The Green Party selected Andrew Massey, transportation engineer and candidate for Toronto Centre in the 2025 provincial election. He is a graduate of the University of Toronto and previously worked as a teacher in Japan. Massey supported the adoption of proportional representation, lowering the voting age to 16, and reforming how election funding operates to help small parties. He supports ending subsidies for oil and gas companies and instead implementing Universal Basic Income, as well as closing tax loopholes and building more affordable housing. Massey also supported free post-secondary education, creating new jobs by expanding green energy, and expand employment programs to help young Canadians. He describes himself as above left-right divisions, and stopped supporting the Liberals after voting for them in 2015 when they abandoned support for proportional representation.

=== People's Party ===
The People's Party of Canada nominated Andy D’Andrea, nuclear engineer and the PPC's candidate in Etobicoke North for the 2025 federal election. He supports lowering taxes and cutting spending, increasing support for law enforcement, and opposing perceived censorship by the government. D'Andrea also supported setting a complete stop to new permanent residents, and the PPC as a whole supports mass deportations. He has socially conservative views, describing "gender ideology" as one of the problems he wants to fight, and was endorsed by the organizations Parents As First Educators and Campaign Life Coalition.

=== Centrist ===
The Centrist Party of Canada nominated Imran Khan, the party's national director and candidate for the party for Scarborough Southwest in the 2025 Canadian federal election. He criticized MP salaries as being too high, and promised to cut them in half while also cutting taxes in half.

=== Canadian Future ===
The Canadian Future Party nominated entrepreneur and lawyer Samuel Baxter, who founded the law firm Baxter Law. Party leader Dominic Cardy admitted that Baxter was unlikely to win the election, but hoped to influence the country's political debates for the next election.

=== Independents ===
Leslie Bory, neo-Nazi convicted hate criminal and 2025 federal election independent candidate in Brantford—Brant South—Six Nations ran as an independent. He was convicted of advocating genocide and promoting hatred against Jewish people. Bory has called for the murder of Jewish people and politicians who supported mask mandates, spread Holocaust denial, and praised Hitler.

Raiden DeDominicis ran as an independent candidate, promising to enforce market competition laws against grocery monopolies, lower flight costs, and move towards modular construction to build homes cheaper. DeDominicis also supported banning gambling ads, regulating AI, and representing young people in politics.

Socially conservative perennial candidate Bill Whatcott ran as an independent.

== Results ==
Canadian federal by-election, April 13, 2026: University—Rosedale Resignation of Chrystia Freeland
Party	Candidate	Votes	%	±%
Liberal	Danielle Martin	19,961	64.33	+0.33
New Democratic	Serena Purdy	5,870	18.92	+9.02
Conservative	Don Hodgson	3,852	12.41	-11.08
Green	Andrew Massey	915	2.95	+1.24
People's	Andy D’Andrea	206	0.66	–
Centrist	Imran Khan	66	0.21	–
Canadian Future	Samuel Baxter	55	0.18	–
Independent	Raiden DeDominicis	45	0.15	–
Independent	Bill Whatcott	36	0.12	–
No Affiliation	Leslie Bory	22	0.07	–
Total valid votes		31,028		
Total rejected ballots		87		
Turnout		31,115	33.11	-32.34
Eligible voters		93,971		
Liberal hold		Swing		-4.32
Source: Elections Canada

== 2025 results ==
2025 Canadian federal election: University—Rosedale
Party	Candidate	Votes	%	±%
Liberal	Chrystia Freeland	39,847	64.00	+17.51
Conservative	Liz Grade	14,624	23.49	+5.54
New Democratic	Serena Purdy	6,168	9.91	–18.17
Green	Ignacio Mongrell	1,066	1.71	–2.73
Communist	Drew Garvie	304	0.49	+0.03
Marxist–Leninist	Barbara Biley	138	0.22	N/A
Independent	Adam Golding	118	0.19	N/A
Total valid votes		62,265	99.26	
Total rejected ballots		466	0.74	-0.14
Turnout		62,731	65.45	+6.33
Eligible voters		95,844		
Liberal notional hold		Swing		+5.98
Source: Elections Canada

== See also ==
- By-elections to the 45th Canadian Parliament
