= 2026 Beaches—East York federal by-election =

By-election in Canada

- August 31, 2026

Riding of Beaches—East York
- Turnout: 40.39% (▼31.55 pp)
	First party	Second party	Third party
	LPC	NDP	CPC
Candidate	Tanveer Shahnawaz	Shannon Devine	Jim Syrbos
Party	Liberal	New Democratic	Conservative
Last election	67.75%	6.85%	23.54%
Popular vote	18,361	8,512	5,116
Percentage	55.68%	25.82%	15.52%
Swing	▼12.06 pp	▲18.96 pp	▼8.02 pp
MP before election
Nate Erskine-Smith (Note: Erskine-Smith resigned his seat on July 7, 2026.)
Liberal
Elected MP
Tanveer Shahnawaz
Liberal

A by-election was held on August 31, 2026 to elect a member of Parliament (MP) to represent Beaches—East York, Ontario, in the House of Commons for the remainder of the 45th Parliament following the resignation of Liberal MP Nate Erskine-Smith.

== Background ==
Liberal MP Nate Erskine-Smith had represented Beaches—East York since the 2015 Canadian federal election and was re-elected in the 2025 Canadian federal election. In December 2023, he announced that he would not seek re-election federally, but reversed that decision after being appointed Minister of Housing, Infrastructure and Communities in December 2024.

Following the 2025 election, Erskine-Smith remained in Cabinet briefly under Prime Minister Mark Carney before being dropped from Cabinet in May 2025. On February 3, 2026, Erskine-Smith announced that he was exploring a bid for the leadership of the Ontario Liberal Party. The following month, he confirmed that he would seek the party's nomination for the Scarborough Southwest provincial by-election.

Erskine-Smith lost the nomination to Ahsanul Hafiz on May 9, 2026. He subsequently appealed the result, alleging irregularities in the nomination process. On May 24, the party's arbitration committee dismissed the appeal, concluding that no irregularities had compromised the outcome of the vote. Erskine-Smith later announced that he would resign from the House of Commons. His resignation took effect on July 7, triggering the by-election.

== Constituency ==
Beaches—East York is an urban federal riding in the city of Toronto, Ontario. The district includes the neighbourhoods of The Beaches, Upper Beaches, East Danforth, O'Connor–Parkview, and part of Old East York.

== Timing ==
On July 8, 2026, Elections Canada announced that the Chief Electoral Officer had received official notice from the Speaker of the House of Commons that the Beaches—East York seat was vacant. The date of the by-election must be announced between July 18, 2026, and January 3, 2027. The by-election must be held on a Monday at least 36 days and no more than 50 days after the by-election is announced. As a result, the earliest possible election day is August 24, 2026, and the latest possible election day is February 22, 2027.

On July 24, Prime Minister Mark Carney called the by-election, setting August 31 as the election date.

== Candidates ==
=== Liberal Party ===
Tanveer Shahnawaz, former office manager for Erskine-Smith, won the Beaches—East York federal Liberal Electoral District Association nomination meeting held on July 18, 2026. 869 votes were cast in total. Claire Seaborn, an environmental lawyer and former chief of staff to then-Natural Resources Minister Jonathan Wilkinson, came in second place, losing by 13 votes according to journalist Steve Paikin who saw a leak of the final results. The third place finisher was reportedly Summer Nudel, registered social worker and senior advisor to the Office of the Commissioner of Housing Equity (OCHE). Arthur Potts, former MPP for Beaches—East York provincial riding, was also on the ballot.

John Tory Jr., aviation executive and son of former Toronto mayor John Tory, had announced his candidacy but suspended his campaign on July 13, 2026, saying that the early date for the nomination meeting left him with no path for success. Marc Hull-Jacquin, founder of a charity that helps women fleeing domestic violence was also interested in the nomination, but withdrew for the same reason as Tory.

=== New Democratic Party ===
NDP leader Avi Lewis ruled out running as his party's candidate in the riding, following earlier media reporting that he might seek the party's nomination in the by-election to obtain a seat in the House of Commons. Mike Layton, former Toronto City Councillor for Ward 11 University—Rosedale and son of late NDP leader Jack Layton, was considering a run, but declined. On July 30, 2026, labour activist Shannon Devine, who had been the party's candidate for the 2025 federal election, was announced as the candidate.

=== Other candidates ===
On July 29, 2026, the Conservative Party announced that its candidate was Jim Syrbos. On July 30, 2026, the Green Party announced that former journalist Bruce Livesey will run under its banner. Michel Lachance and Cameron Thomas completed the ballot, running for the People's Party and Canadian Future Party, respectively.

== Opinion polling ==
Polling firm	Last date of polling	Link	LPC	CPC	NDP	GPC	PPC	Sample size	Lead
Forum Research	August 27, 2026		35	23	27	10	—	499	8
Poliwave	August 19, 2026		55.0	20.6	20.7	2.6	1.2	538	34.3
Mainstreet Research	March 13, 2026		67	17	12	3	2	440	50

== Result ==
Canadian federal by-election, August 31, 2026: Beaches—East York Resignation of Nate Erskine-Smith
Party	Candidate	Votes	%	±%
Liberal	Tanveer Shahnawaz	18,504	55.84	-11.90
New Democratic	Shannon Devine	8,496	25.64	+18.78
Conservative	Jim Syrbos	5,142	15.52	-8.02
Green	Bruce Livesey	581	1.75	+0.47
People's	Michel Lachance	249	0.75	—
Canadian Future	Cameron Thomas	165	0.50	—
Total valid votes		33,137		
Total rejected ballots		111		
Turnout		33,248	40.82	-31.12
Eligible voters		81,460		
Liberal hold		Swing		-15.51
Source: Elections Canada

== Previous result ==
2025 Canadian federal election: Beaches—East York
Party	Candidate	Votes	%	±%	Expenditures
Liberal	Nate Erskine-Smith	39,804	67.75	+11.17	$119,113.28
Conservative	Jocelyne Poirier	13,830	23.54	+9.19	$47,999.71
New Democratic	Shannon Devine	4,027	6.85	−15.67	$56,544.86
Green	Jack Pennings	748	1.27	−1.44	$0.00
Independent	Diane Joseph	161	0.27	N/A	$0.00
Communist	Elizabeth Rowley	146	0.25	−0.01	$0.00
Marxist–Leninist	Steve Rutchinski	39	0.07	−0.03	$0.00
Total valid votes/expense limit		58,755	99.47	+0.13	$128,551.93
Total rejected ballots		311	0.53	–0.13	
Turnout		59,066	71.94	+7.03	
Eligible voters		82,102			
Liberal hold		Swing		+0.99	
Source: Elections Canada

== See also ==
- By-elections to the 45th Canadian Parliament
- Beaches—East York (federal electoral district)
- 2026 North Vancouver—Capilano federal by-election
- 2026 Chicoutimi—Le Fjord federal by-election
