= 2026 Yorkton—Melville federal by-election =

Pending Canadian federal by-election

- December 7, 2026

Riding of Yorkton—Melville
	CPC	LPC	NDP
Candidate	Nelson Pohl	Aaron Kienle	Tammy Bobyk-Jacquemart
Party	Conservative	Liberal	New Democratic
Last election	77.55%	14.42%	5.50%
Incumbent MP
Vacant (Note: The seat was held by Cathay Wagantall (Conservative) until her resignation on August 31, 2026.)

A federal by-election will be held on December 7, 2026, in the Saskatchewan federal electoral district of Yorkton—Melville following the resignation of Conservative member of Parliament (MP) Cathay Wagantall on August 31, 2026.

== Background ==
Wagantall was first elected to the House of Commons in the 2015 Canadian federal election, succeeding retiring Conservative MP Garry Breitkreuz. She was re-elected in the 2019, 2021 and 2025 federal elections.

In the 2025 federal election, Wagantall was re-elected with 28,702 votes, or 77.5 per cent of the vote. Liberal candidate Luke Guimond finished second with 5,338 votes, or 14.4 per cent, followed by New Democratic Party candidate Michaela Krakowetz with 2,034 votes, or 5.5 per cent.

Wagantall had initially announced that she would not seek re-election but intended to remain an MP until the next federal election. On June 17, 2026, she announced that she had changed her plans and would instead resign from the House of Commons effective August 31. Wagantall said the decision was a personal one, explaining that she and her husband had considered their future and decided it was the appropriate time for her to leave federal politics.

Wagantall's departure triggered a federal by-election in a riding that has been represented by the Conservatives since 2000. The riding had previously been held by the New Democratic Party and its predecessor, the Co-operative Commonwealth Federation, for much of the period between its creation in 1968 and 1993.

== Timing ==
The speaker of the House of Commons formally notified Chief Electoral Officer Stéphane Perrault of the vacancy on September 1, 2026. Under the federal by-election timetable, the date of the by-election must be announced by February 28, 2027. The election must be held on a Monday, at least 36 days and no more than 50 days after the announcement.

The last possible date the by-election could be held was April 19, 2027. On November 1, 2026, the election was called to be held on December 7.

== Candidates ==
=== Conservative Party ===
The Conservative Party selected Yorkton-area farmer and small business owner Nelson Pohl as its candidate on June 13, 2026. Pohl defeated Yorkton city councillor and school principal Quinn Haider and Melville-area farmer and information technology worker Albert Duff for the nomination.

The nomination contest had originally been held to choose the party's candidate for the next general election after Wagantall announced that she would not seek another term. Following Wagantall's decision to resign early, Pohl became the Conservative candidate for the resulting by-election.

=== Liberal Party ===
The Liberal Party selected small business owner and Yorkton Mayor Aaron Kienle as its candidate on October 29, 2026.

=== NDP ===
The New Democratic Party nominated Tammy Bobyk-Jacquemart, a healthcare professional, as its candidate.

=== Green Party ===
The Green Party of Canada re-nominated Valerie Brooks, their 2025 candidate for the seat.

=== People's Party ===
The PPC nominated Dionne Fehler as their candidate.

== Result ==
Canadian federal by-election, December 7, 2026: Yorkton—Melville Resignation of Cathay Wagantall
The by-election will be held on December 7, 2026.
Party	Candidate	Votes	%	±%	Expenditures
Conservative	Nelson Pohl				
Liberal	Aaron Kienle				
New Democratic	Tammy Bobyk-Jacquemart				
Green	Valerie Brooks				
People's	Dionne Fehler				
Total valid votes					
Total rejected ballots					
Turnout					
Eligible voters		56,000			
Source: Elections Canada

== 2025 result ==
2025 Canadian federal election: Yorkton—Melville
Party	Candidate	Votes	%	±%	Expenditures
Conservative	Cathay Wagantall	28,702	77.55	+8.76	
Liberal	Luke Guimond	5,338	14.42	+8.11	
New Democratic	Michaela Krakowetz	2,034	5.50	-6.61	
Green	Valerie Brooks	713	1.93	+0.19	
Libertarian	Alec Guggenmos	226	0.61	–	
Total valid votes/expense limit		37,013			
Total rejected ballots					
Turnout					
Eligible voters		56,000			
Source: Elections Canada

== See also ==
- By-elections to the 45th Canadian Parliament
