= 2026 Scarborough North federal by-election =

Pending Canadian federal by-election

- December 7, 2026

Riding of Scarborough North
	LPC	CPC	NDP
Candidate	James Li	Dameon Halstead	Kingsley Kwok
Party	Liberal	Conservative	New Democratic
Last election	62.95%	33.14%	3.91%
Incumbent MP
Vacant (Note: Seat was last held by Shaun Chen (Liberal). Chen resigned as an MP on August 15, 2026.)

A by-election will be held on December 7, 2026, to elect a member of Parliament (MP) to represent Scarborough North, Ontario, in the House of Commons of Canada for the remainder of the 45th Canadian Parliament following the resignation of Liberal MP Shaun Chen.

== Background ==
Liberal MP Shaun Chen was first elected to the House of Commons in the 2015 Canadian federal election and was re-elected in 2019, 2021, and 2025. Prior to entering federal politics, Chen served as chair of the Toronto District School Board.

On August 10, 2026, Chen announced that he would resign as a member of Parliament effective August 15, citing ongoing health issues resulting from a car accident in late 2025. Chen said that his injuries had prevented him from travelling to Ottawa as frequently as his parliamentary duties required.

== Constituency ==
Scarborough North is an urban federal riding in the northern part of Scarborough in Toronto, Ontario. The district includes the neighbourhoods of Agincourt and Milliken east of Midland Avenue, as well as Morningside Heights and Malvern.

== Timing ==
On August 17, 2026, Elections Canada's chief electoral officer received official notice from the speaker of the House of Commons that the seat was vacant. The latest date the by-election could have been held was April 5, 2027. On November 1, 2026, the election was called to be held on December 7.

== Candidates ==
=== Liberal Party ===
The Liberal Party selected Chartered Professional Accountant and community advocate James Li as its candidate on October 29, 2026.

=== Conservative Party ===
On November 4, the Conservatives announced Dameon Halstead as the candidate. He is a former school board candidate, a chaplain and community volunteer.

=== NDP ===
The NDP nominated Kingsley Kwok as their candidate for the by-election. Kwok is a respiratory therapist at Scarborough General Hospital and sits on the executive board of the Ontario Public Service Employees Union.

=== Green Party ===
The Green Party will run Vicki Jewt, Green Party of Ontario candidate in Scarborough—Rouge Park in the 2025 Ontario election.

== Result ==
Canadian federal by-election, December 7, 2026: Scarborough North Resignation of Shaun Chen
The by-election will be held on December 7, 2026.
Party	Candidate	Votes	%	±%	Expenditures
Liberal	James Li				
Conservative	Dameon Halstead				
New Democratic	Kingsley Kwok				
Green	Vicki Jewt				
Total valid votes/expense limit					
Total rejected ballots					
Turnout					
Eligible voters		78,591			
Source: Elections Canada

== Previous result ==
2025 Canadian federal election: Scarborough North
Party	Candidate	Votes	%	±%	Expenditures
Liberal	Shaun Chen	29,418	62.95	–4.03	
Conservative	Gurmit Sandhu	15,487	33.14	+15.05	
New Democratic	Karishma Manji	1,827	3.91	–7.68	
Total valid votes/expense limit		46,732			
Total rejected ballots		446			
Turnout		47,178	60.02		
Eligible voters		78,591			
Liberal notional hold		Swing		–9.54	
Source: Elections Canada

== See also ==
- By-elections to the 45th Canadian Parliament
- Scarborough North (federal electoral district)
