= Regional Chair (Ontario) =

Regional chair
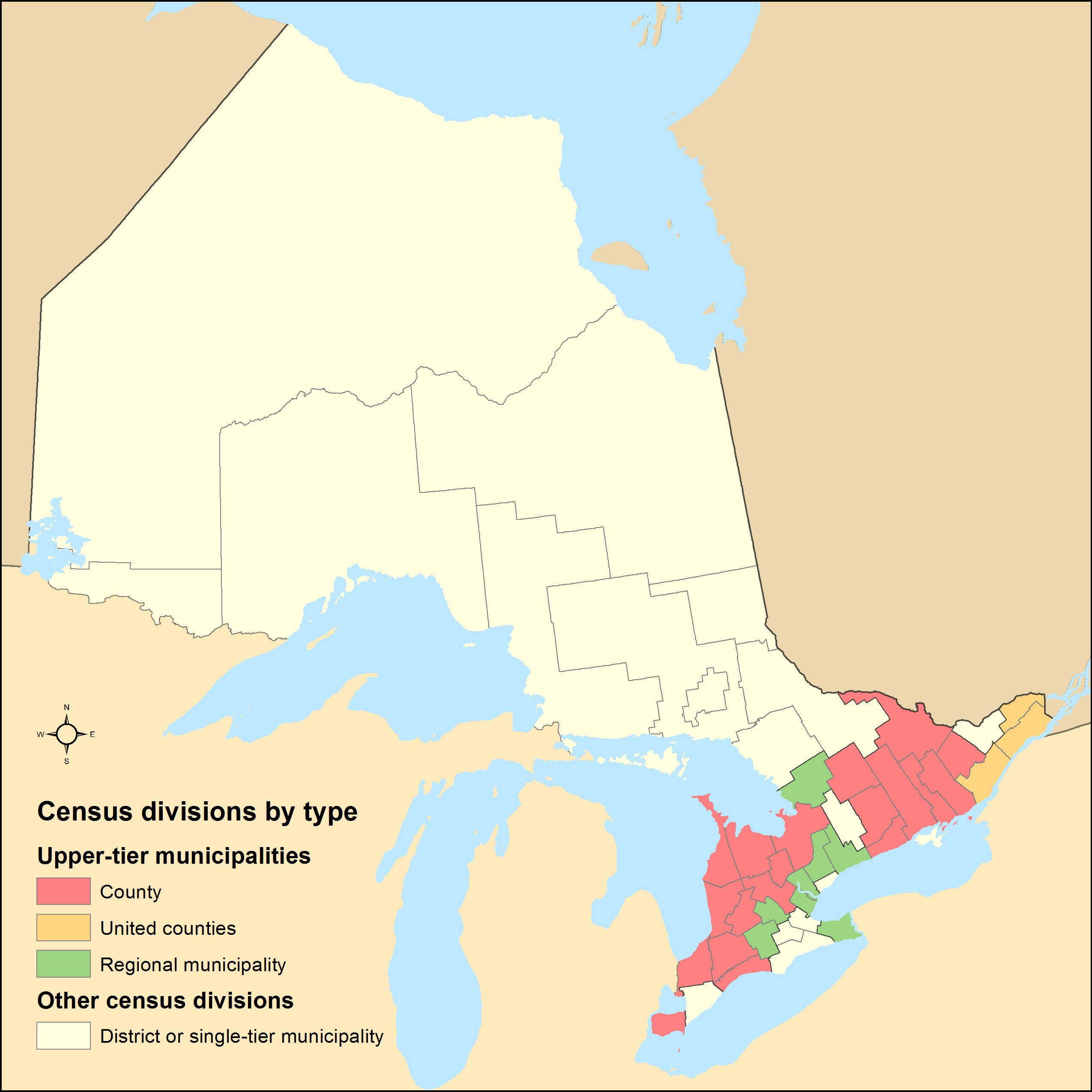
- Upper-tier municipalities in Ontario

Occupation
- Names: District chair; warden
- Occupation type: Politician
- Activity sectors: Politics and government

Description
- Competencies: Municipal and public administration; law; public speaking; budgeting; decision making; communications
- Related jobs: Mayor; reeve; city councillor; member of provincial parliament; member of parliament

A regional chair is the head of council and chief executive officer of a regional municipality in Ontario, Canada. The position is known as the district chair in the District Municipality of Muskoka and the county chair in Simcoe County. Other upper-tier municipalities, including Oxford County, use the title warden.

Under sections 225 and 226.1 of the Municipal Act, 2001, the head of council presides over council meetings, provides leadership to council, represents the municipality at official functions and serves as its chief executive officer.

Chairs elected by councillors in most regional municipalities. Since 1997 in Waterloo Region, 2000 in Halton Region and 2014 in Durham Region, the chair is directly elected along with the rest of the council.

The position is similar to the role of the mayor or reeve in lower- or single-tier municipalities. In the former Metropolitan Toronto, now the amalgamated City of Toronto, the regional chair was called Metro Chairman.

== Regional chairs ==
On November 10, 2026, Municipal Affairs and Housing Minister Rob Flack announced appointments to the eight positions.

Regional chairs appointed in November 2026
Municipality	Chair	Previous or concurrent office
Durham	Kevin Ashe	Mayor of Pickering
Halton	Ann Mulvale	Former mayor of Oakville
Muskoka	Scott Aitchison (designate)	Member of Parliament for Parry Sound—Muskoka; former mayor of Huntsville
Niagara	Frank Campion	Mayor of Welland
Peel	Nando Iannicca	Regional chair since 2018
Simcoe	Don McIsaac	Mayor of Orillia
Waterloo	Scott Davey	Kitchener city councillor
York	Steven Del Duca	Mayor of Vaughan; former leader of the Ontario Liberal Party

Aitchison, the Conservative MP for Parry Sound—Muskoka, was scheduled to assume office as Muskoka District chair on December 1, 2026, following his resignation from the House of Commons.
