= Daniel Gobeil =

Canadian politician and dairy farmer

Daniel Gobeil MP

Member of Parliament for Chicoutimi—Le Fjord
- Incumbent
- Assumed office August 31, 2026
- Preceded by: Richard Martel

Personal details
- Party: Liberal
- Occupation: Dairy farmer, agronomist

Daniel Gobeil is a Canadian dairy farmer, agronomist and politician who is the Liberal member of Parliament for Chicoutimi—Le Fjord. He was elected to the Canadian House of Commons in the 2026 Chicoutimi—Le Fjord federal by-election. Before entering politics, he was president of Les Producteurs de lait du Québec (PLQ) from 2020 to 2026 and vice-president of the Dairy Farmers of Canada.

== Agricultural career ==
Gobeil is an agronomist by training and a dairy farmer in La Baie, Saguenay, Quebec. He owns Ferme du Fjord, a family farm originally acquired by his grandfather and subsequently operated by three generations of the family. The farm has approximately 200 cattle, including 125 lactating cows, and more than 1,000 acres (400 ha) used for forage and crops including barley, oats and soybeans.

Gobeil became involved with Les Producteurs de lait du Québec in 2007. He became the organization's first vice-president in December 2017 and was also president of the Producteurs de lait du Saguenay–Lac-Saint-Jean. In April 2020, following the departure of Bruno Letendre, Gobeil became acting president of the provincial organization. Its board of directors elected him president on May 1, 2020.

As president, Gobeil represented Quebec dairy farmers on issues including supply management, agricultural trade and compensation associated with international trade agreements. He was among agricultural representatives who supported federal legislation intended to protect supply-managed sectors from further concessions in future trade negotiations.

Gobeil joined the board of directors of the Dairy Farmers of Canada in 2017 and was elected vice-president in September 2023. He remained president of Les Producteurs de lait du Québec until July 24, 2026, when he resigned to enter federal politics. He also left his positions as president of the Producteurs de lait du Saguenay–Lac-Saint-Jean and vice-president of the Dairy Farmers of Canada.

== Political career ==
In July 2026, Gobeil became the Liberal candidate in the federal by-election in Chicoutimi—Le Fjord. The seat had become vacant after Conservative MP Richard Martel was appointed to the Senate of Canada.

His candidacy attracted attention because of his prominence in Quebec agriculture and his previous advocacy for supply management. Before his candidacy was formally announced, a July poll placed the Bloc Québécois at 30 per cent, the Liberals at 28 per cent and the Conservatives at 26 per cent in the riding. During the campaign, Prime Minister Mark Carney campaigned with Gobeil in the riding.

Gobeil's previous leadership of the dairy producers became an issue during the campaign. In August 2026, several dairy farmers affected by the proposed Alto high-speed rail project criticized him for what they described as insufficient opposition to the project's potential effects on agricultural land while he headed the PLQ. The Liberal Party responded that the project needed to take farmers' circumstances into account and that protecting agricultural land remained a priority.

== Electoral history ==
Canadian federal by-election, August 31, 2026: Chicoutimi—Le Fjord Resignation of Richard Martel
Party	Candidate	Votes	%	±%
Liberal	Daniel Gobeil	16,333	51.55	+20.43
Bloc Québécois	Caroline Dubé	10,397	32.82	+1.63
Conservative	Régis Gaudreault	3,985	12.58	-21.56
New Democratic	Raphaël Émond	577	1.82	–0.13
Green	Nathe Perrone	218	0.69	-0.25
People's	François Sabourin	171	0.54	-0.13
Total valid votes		31,681		
Total rejected ballots		363		
Turnout		32,044	42.96	-25.58
Eligible voters		74,952		
Liberal gain from Conservative		Swing		+20.91
Source: Elections Canada
