= Fédération des producteurs de lait du Québec =

Les producteurs de lait du Québec (PLQ) is an agricultural organization representing milk producers in the Canadian province of Quebec. This democratic organization, whose directions are set in the general meetings of its members, is administered by a board of directors made up of the presidents of the 14 regional boards. Affiliated with the Union des producteurs agricoles (UPA), the PLQ works to defend and promote the general interests of its members.

The some 6,000 dairy farms in Quebec collectively market nearly 3 billion litres of milk through the Joint Plan (1980) of Quebec milk producers. Producers have delegated the PLQ with the responsibility of negotiating all sales conditions with processor representatives on their behalf. Producers and processors negotiate and work together through marketing agreements and various related committees on the issues of plant supplies, milk quality rules and raw material prices. The prices are negotiated on the basis of a Canadian target price that takes into account the most efficient producers’ costs. Since the costs of transporting milk from farms to plants are assumed by milk producers, Les Producteurs de lait du Québec also negotiate these conditions with processors under a provincial agreement.

== History ==
Milk producers joined forces in 1983 with the 'Fédération des producteurs de lait du Québec (FPLQ), a federation of 14 syndicates that included two federations: the fluid milk producers (1970) and the industrial milk producers (1966).

On May 1, 2014, the Fédération des producteurs de lait du Québec became Les Producteurs de lait du Québec. Out of concern for a lighter administrative load and consistency with their provincial joint marketing plan, the 14 regional syndicates and the Federation disbanded to form a single legal entity. It went from a federation of 14 member syndicates to one single organization where all producers are direct members. Due to this transformation, it was necessary to change the name. The mission of Les Producteurs de lait du Québec is to represent and collectively market the milk of all milk producers, and its structure is still set up for regional representation, but it is now based on the new UPA territories. The new organization, Les Producteurs de lait du Québec, is appropriately named since the some 6,000 dairy farms in Quebec are now its direct members.
