= Scarborough North (federal electoral district) =

Federal electoral district in Ontario, Canada

Ontario electoral district
- Interactive map of riding boundaries from the 2025 federal election
- Coordinates: 43.798°N 79.256°W

Federal electoral district
- Legislature: House of Commons
MP
Vacant
- District created: 2013
- First contested: 2015
- Last contested: 2021
- District webpage: profile, map

Demographics
- Population (2021): 94,717
- Electors (2015): 64,427
- Area (km²): 32
- Pop. density (per km²): 2,959.9
- Census division: Toronto
- Census subdivision: Toronto (part)

Scarborough North (French: Scarborough-Nord) is a federal electoral district in Toronto, Ontario.

Scarborough North was created by the 2012 federal electoral boundaries redistribution and was legally defined in the 2013 representation order. It came into effect upon the call of the 42nd Canadian federal election on 19 October 2015. It was created out of parts of the electoral districts of Scarborough—Rouge River (92%) and Scarborough—Agincourt (8%). Scarborough North was held by Liberal Shaun Chen until his resignation in August 2026 following a car crash.

The riding has one of the highest percentages of visible minorities in any electoral district in the country (86%), and the lowest percentage of White Caucasians in any electoral district (7.5%).

== Geography ==
The riding consists of the northern part of the Scarborough district of Toronto. It contains the neighbourhoods of Agincourt (east of Midland Avenue), Milliken (east of Midland Avenue), Morningside Heights (Brookside), and Malvern.

== Demographics ==
According to the 2021 Canadian census

Ethnic groups: 42.2% Chinese, 26.8% South Asian, 8.2% Black, 7.5% White, 6.8% Filipino, 1.0% Southeast Asian, 1.0% Latin American
Languages: 30.0% English, 20.9% Cantonese, 12.3% Mandarin, 8.6% Tamil, 3.6% Tagalog, 2.4% Urdu, 2.2% Gujarati, 1.1% Punjabi
Religions: 33.0% Christian (16.1% Catholic, 1.5% Christian Orthodox, 1.4% Anglican, 1.2% Pentecostal, 1.1% Baptist, 11.7% Other), 14.7% Hindu, 9.2% Muslim, 4.5% Buddhist, 1.2% Sikh, 36.6% None
Median income: $30,400 (2020)
Average income: $38,560 (2020)

== Members of Parliament ==
This riding has elected the following members of Parliament:

Parliament	Years	Member	Party
Scarborough North; Riding created from Scarborough—Agincourt and Scarborough—Rouge River
42nd	2015–2019	Shaun Chen	Liberal
43rd	2019–2021	Shaun Chen	Liberal
44th	2021–2025	Shaun Chen	Liberal
45th	2025–2026	Shaun Chen	Liberal

== Election results ==
Graph of election results in Scarborough—Agincourt since 2011 (redistributed). Parties that never received at least 2% of the vote are omitted.

=== 2023 representation order ===
Canadian federal by-election, December 7, 2026 Resignation of Shaun Chen
The by-election will be held on December 7, 2026.
Party	Candidate	Votes	%	±%	Expenditures
Liberal	James Li				
Conservative	Dameon Halstead				
New Democratic	Kingsley Kwok				
Green	Vicki Jewt				
Total valid votes/expense limit					
Total rejected ballots					
Turnout					
Eligible voters		78,591			
Source: Elections Canada

2025 Canadian federal election
Party	Candidate	Votes	%	±%	Expenditures
Liberal	Shaun Chen	29,418	62.95	–4.03	
Conservative	Gurmit Sandhu	15,487	33.14	+15.05	
New Democratic	Karishma Manji	1,827	3.91	–7.68	
Total valid votes/expense limit		46,732			
Total rejected ballots		446			
Turnout		47,178	60.02		
Eligible voters		78,591			
Liberal notional hold		Swing		–9.54	
Source: Elections Canada

2021 federal election redistributed results
Party	Vote	%
Liberal	26,796	66.98
Conservative	7,238	18.09
New Democratic	4,636	11.59
People's	973	2.43
Others	361	0.90

=== 2013 representation order ===
2021 Canadian federal election
Party	Candidate	Votes	%	±%	Expenditures
Liberal	Shaun Chen	21,178	66.6	+13.0	$82,302.74
Conservative	Fazal Shah	5,999	18.9	-11.4	$17,653.09
New Democratic	Christina Love	3,514	11.0	-1.9	$26.24
People's	David Moore	763	2.4	+1.5	$18.24
Centrist	Sheraz Khan	361	1.1	N/A	$4,073.67
Total valid votes/expense limit		31,815	99.0	–	$103,970.89
Total rejected ballots		337	1.0		
Turnout		32,152	50.6		
Eligible voters		63,589			
Liberal hold		Swing		+12.2	
Source: Elections Canada

2019 Canadian federal election
Party	Candidate	Votes	%	±%	Expenditures
Liberal	Shaun Chen	20,911	53.6	+5.36	$97,385.61
Conservative	David Kong	11,838	30.3	+2.90	$29,125.27
New Democratic	Yan Chen	5,039	12.9	-9.17	$32,079.36
Green	Avery Velez	796	2.0	+0.52	$0.00
People's	Jude Guerrier	370	0.9	-	$0.00
United	Janet Robinson	83	0.2	-	none listed
Total valid votes/expense limit		39,037	100.0		
Total rejected ballots		385			
Turnout		39,422	59.7		
Eligible voters		66,018			
Liberal hold		Swing		+2.46	
Source: Elections Canada

2015 Canadian federal election
Party	Candidate	Votes	%	±%	Expenditures
Liberal	Shaun Chen	18,904	48.24	+19.37	$72,471.61
Conservative	Ravinder Malhi	10,737	27.40	-5.98	$101,170.06
New Democratic	Rathika Sitsabaiesan	8,648	22.07	-13.3	$135,280.61
Green	Eleni MacDonald	579	1.48	-0.14	$668.91
Independent	Raphael Rosch	164	0.42	–	$210.83
Independent	Aasia Khatoon	156	0.40	–	$1,724.47
Total valid votes/expense limit		39,188	100.0		$199,432.15
Total rejected ballots		216	–	–	
Turnout		39,404	60.87	–	
Eligible voters		64,827			
Liberal notional gain from New Democratic		Swing		+16.34	
Source: Elections Canada

2011 federal election redistributed results
Party	Vote	%
New Democratic	12,672	35.37
Conservative	11,959	33.38
Liberal	10,343	28.87
Green	579	1.62
Other	277	0.77

== Student vote results ==
2025 Scarborough North student vote
57.08%	22.83%	20.09%
Liberal	Conservative	NDP

== See also ==
- List of Canadian electoral districts
- Historical federal electoral districts of Canada
