= 2018 Chicoutimi—Le Fjord federal by-election =

Canadian parliamentary by-election

- July 18, 2018

Seat of Chicoutimi—Le Fjord
- Turnout: 36.06% (▼30.61pp)
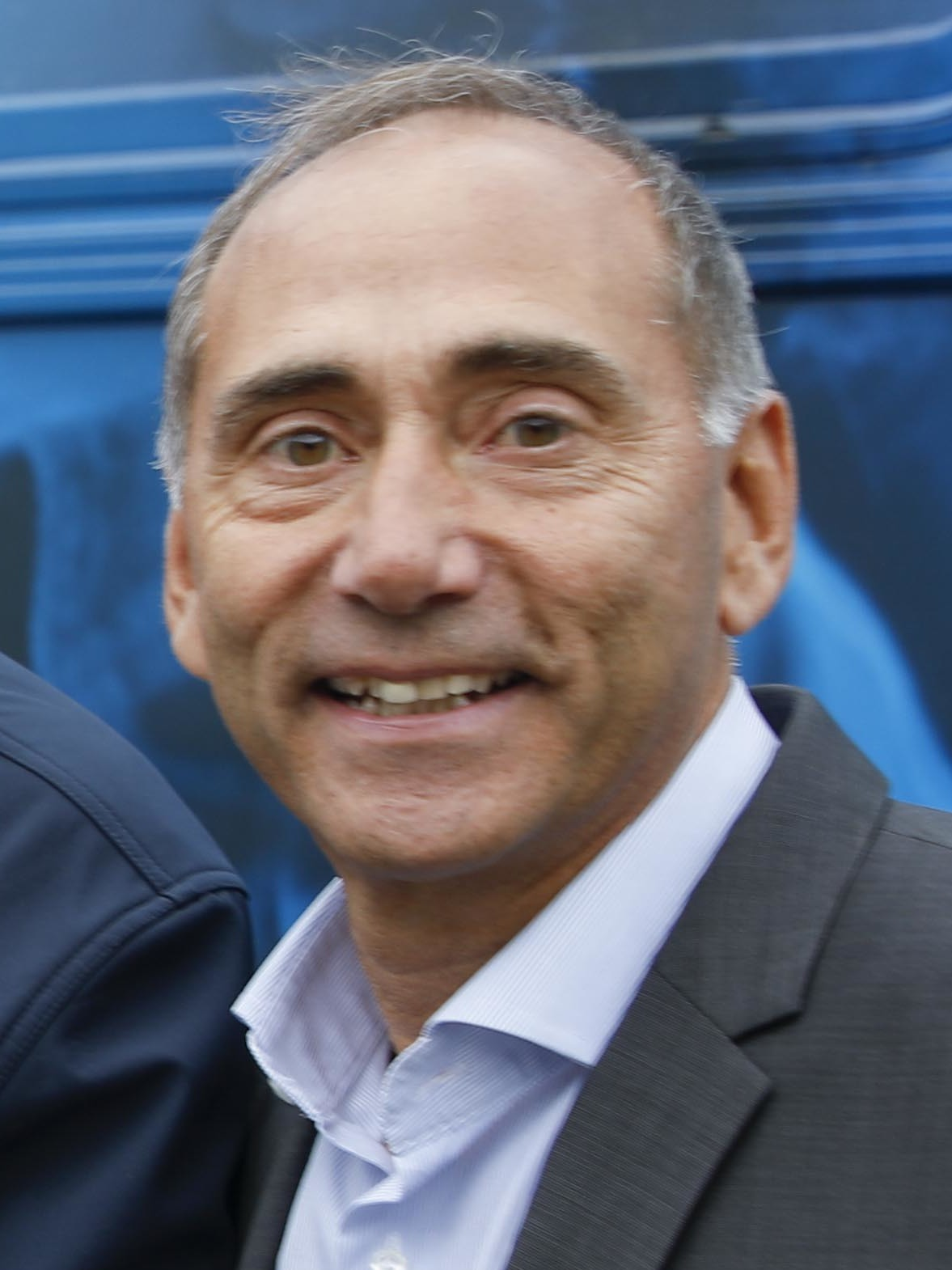
	First party	Second party
		LPC
Candidate	Richard Martel	Lina Boivin
Party	Conservative	Liberal
Popular vote	12,580	7,032
Percentage	52.73%	29.48%
Swing	▲36.13pp	▼1.61pp
	Third party	Fourth party
	NDP	BQ
Candidate	Éric Dubois	Catherine Bouchard-Tremblay
Party	New Democratic	Bloc Québécois
Popular vote	2,065	1,337
Percentage	8.66%	5.60%
Swing	▼21.06pp	▼14.92pp
MP before election
Denis Lemieux
Liberal
Elected MP
Richard Martel
Conservative

A by-election was held in the federal riding of Chicoutimi—Le Fjord in Quebec on June 18, 2018, following the resignation of incumbent Liberal MP Denis Lemieux.

The seat was gained by the Conservative Party of Canada, with Richard Martel winning on a large swing of 19 points, becoming the new MP. The result was a surprise, as in the 2015 election, the conservative candidate had come in 4th place. Martel's victory was the first by-election loss for the Liberals since 2013.

== Background ==
=== Constituency ===
The riding is located about 200 kilometres north of Quebec City, and consists of the northern part of the Chicoutimi borough of Saguenay, as well as the La Baie borough and the municipalities of Ferland-et-Boilleau, L'Anse-Saint-Jean, Petit-Saguenay, Rivière-Éternité and Saint-Félix-d'Otis and the unorganized territory of Lalemant.

=== Representation ===
The by-election was triggered by the announcement by Liberal MP Denis Lemieux on November 6, 2017, that he would be resigning his seat for family reasons; his resignation took effect on December 1, 2017. Lemieux was first elected in the 2015 federal election with 31.1% of the vote, narrowly defeating NDP incumbent Dany Morin.

== Campaign ==
=== Liberal ===
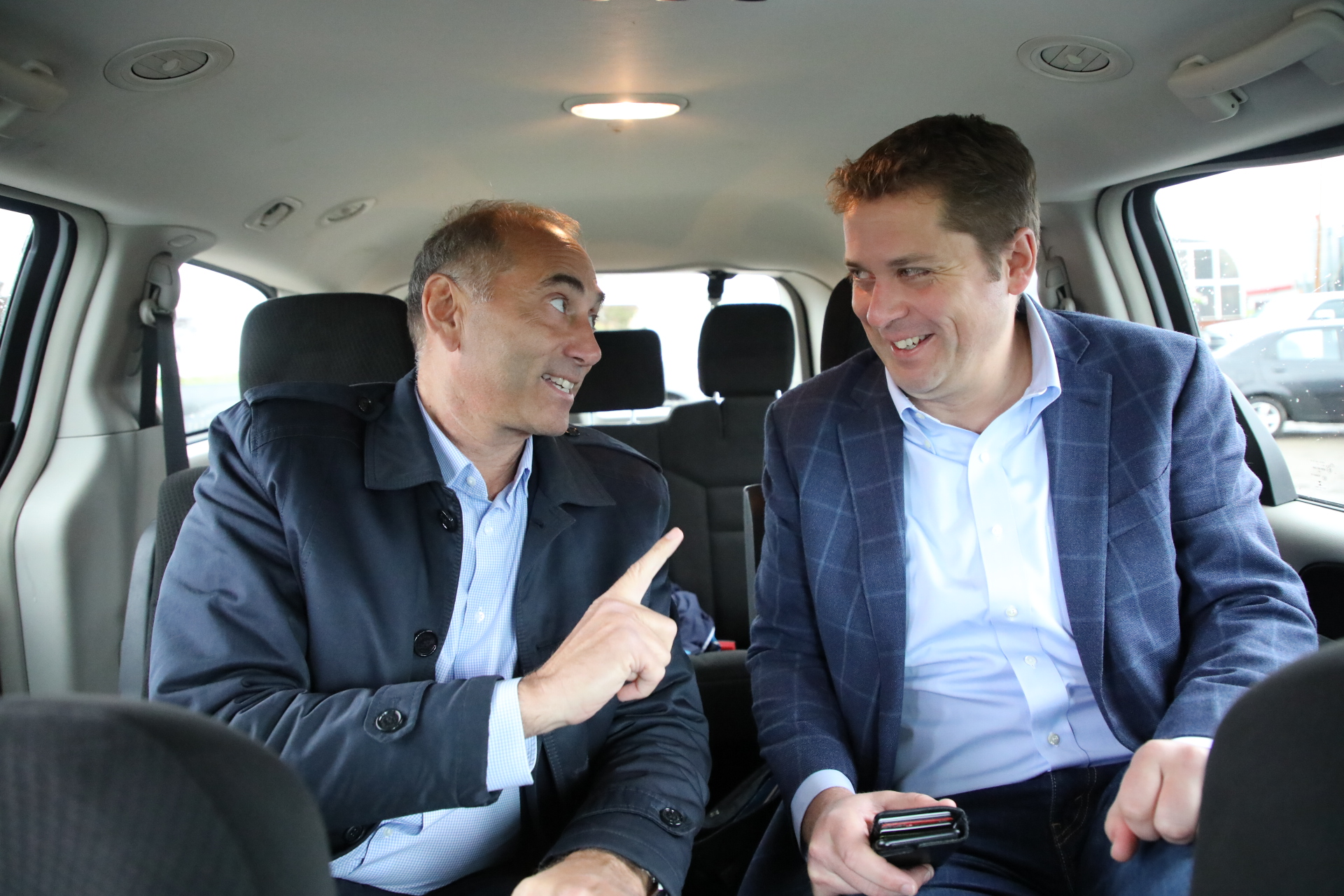
Richard Martel on the campaign trail with Conservative Party leader Andrew Scheer

Port Saguenay board member Lina Boivin, who was endorsed by Lemieux, defeated former Saint-Charles de Bourget mayor Michel Ringuette for the Liberal nomination, held in May 2018. A rumoured candidate for the Liberal nomination was former Paralympic athlete and head of university sport at UQAC, Philippe Gagnon. Former municipal councillor and former Quebec Liberal MNA candidate Joan Simard, local businessman Simon-Pierre Murdock, who later endorsed Boivin, and Chicoutimi-Nord Municipal Councillor Marc Pettersen declined to run for the nomination. "Promotion Saguenay" Director of Industrial Development and Corporate Affairs Claude Bouchard had his candidacy rejected by the federal Liberal party.

=== New Democrat ===
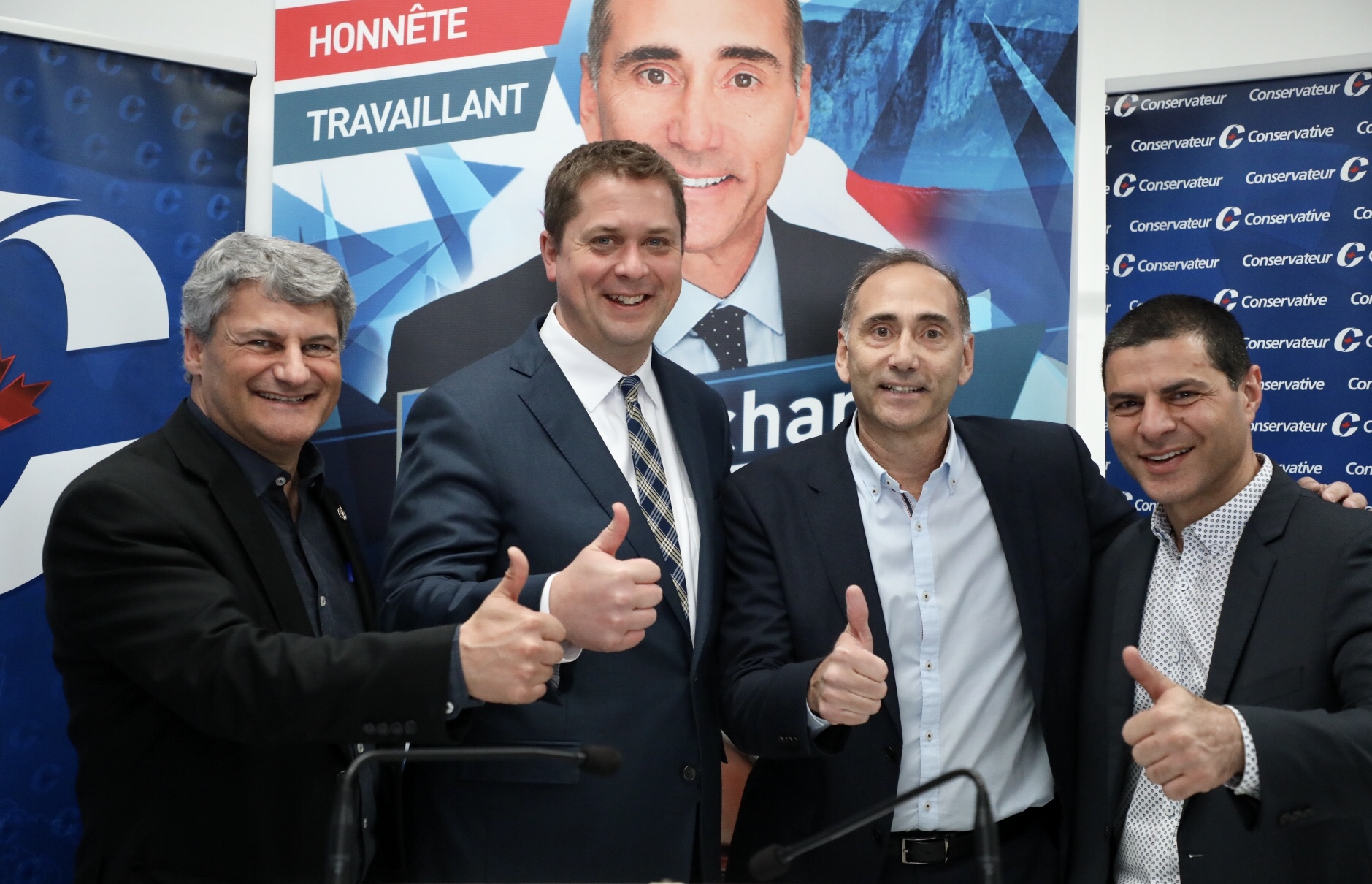
Conservative MPs at the party campaign office; Gérard Deltell, Andrew Scheer, Richard Martel and Alain Rayes

Éric Dubois, a union advisor at the CSN and former federal NDP candidate, was acclaimed as the NDP candidate on January 22, 2018. Dany Morin and former Ontario MPP and federal NDP leader Jagmeet Singh both expressed interest in running for the nomination but decided against it.

=== Bloc Quebecois ===
Catherine Bouchard-Tremblay was acclaimed as the candidate for the Bloc Québécois on May 18, 2018. Former Dubuc PQ MNA Jean-Marie Claveau and teacher Valérie Tremblay were rumoured to be interested in running for the Bloc Québécois nomination. Former Chicoutimi—Le Fjord BQ MP Robert Bouchard, Saguenay firefighter Mario Gagnon, and UQAC political science professor Michel Roche declined to run for the nomination.

The short-lived « Groupe parlementaire québécois » / « Québec debout », formed by seven members of parliament after they left the Bloc Québécois, considered nominating a candidate but failed to do so.

=== Conservative ===
Two-time Ron Lapointe Trophy winning QMJHL coach Richard Martel was named the Conservative candidate on December 20, 2017.

=== Green ===
Lynda Youde was acclaimed as the candidate for the Green Party on May 22, 2018.

=== Warrant ===
The Speaker's warrant regarding the vacancy was received on December 4, 2017; under the Parliament of Canada Act the writ for a by-election had to be dropped no later than June 2, 2018, 180 days after the Chief Electoral Officer was officially notified of the vacancy via a warrant issued by the Speaker. On May 13, 2018, the writ was dropped for a by-election for June 18, 2018.

== Results ==
Canadian federal by-election, June 18, 2018: Chicoutimi—Le Fjord Resignation of Denis Lemieux
Party	Candidate	Votes	%	±%
Conservative	Richard Martel	12,580	52.73	+36.13
Liberal	Lina Boivin	7,032	29.48	-1.61
New Democratic	Éric Dubois	2,065	8.66	-21.06
Bloc Québécois	Catherine Bouchard-Tremblay	1,337	5.60	-14.92
Green	Lynda Youde	736	3.09	+1.02
Independent	John "The Engineer" Turmel	104	0.44	
Total valid votes/expense limit		23,854	100.00	
Total rejected ballots				
Turnout		36.06%		
Eligible voters		66,152		
Conservative gain from Liberal		Swing		+18.87

== 2015 result ==
2015 Canadian federal election: Chicoutimi—Le Fjord
Party	Candidate	Votes	%	±%	Expenditures
Liberal	Denis Lemieux	13,619	31.09	+25.34	$15,757.95
New Democratic	Dany Morin	13,019	29.72	-7.96	$61,908.19
Bloc Québécois	Élise Gauthier	8,990	20.52	-8.29	$34,879.59
Conservative	Caroline Ste-Marie	7,270	16.60	-8.97	$33,846.47
Green	Dany St-Gelais	907	2.07	+0.55	$64.43
Total valid votes/expense limit		43,805	98.33		$201,130.77
Total rejected ballots		745	1.67	–	
Turnout		44,550	66.67	–	
Eligible voters		66,821			
Liberal gain from New Democratic		Swing		+16.65	
Source: Elections Canada

== See also ==
- By-elections to the 42nd Canadian Parliament
