= Marcel Dionne (politician) =

Canadian politician

Member of Parliament for Chicoutimi
- In office 1979–1984
- Preceded by: Paul Langlois
- Succeeded by: André Harvey

Personal details
- Born: 21 November 1931 Saint-Victor-de-Tring, Quebec, Canada
- Died: 3 March 1998 (aged 66)
- Party: Liberal

Marcel Dionne (21 November 1931 – 3 March 1998) was a Liberal party member of the House of Commons of Canada. He was born in Saint-Victor-de-Tring, Quebec and became a businessman by career.

He won the Chicoutimi electoral district in the 1979 federal election and was re-elected there in 1980. Dionne was defeated in the 1984 election by André Harvey of the Progressive Conservative party. He served in the 31st and 32nd Canadian Parliaments.

Dionne died on 3 March 1998 following a heart attack.
