= Brassard (surname) =

Brassard is a surname. It may have derived from brassard, an armband used as an item of military uniform. Notable individuals with the surname include:

- Augustin Brassard (1922–1971), Canadian politician
- Derick Brassard (born 1987), Canadian ice hockey player
- François Brassard (1908–1976), Canadian musician
- Gilles Brassard (born 1955), Canadian computer scientist
- Fernando Brassard (born 1971), Portuguese footballer
- Jacques Brassard (born 1940), Canadian politician
- Jean-Luc Brassard (born 1972), Canadian freestyle skier
- Paul Brassard, American politician
- Pierre Brassard (born 1966), Canadian actor
- Roy Brassard (1930–2008), Canadian politician
- Vincent Brassard (1919–1974), Canadian politician
