= Gilbert Fillion =

Canadian politician

Member of Parliament for Chicoutimi
- In office 1993–1997

Personal details
- Born: 27 July 1940 Sainte-Anne-de-Chicoutimi, Quebec, Canada
- Died: 27 May 2007 (aged 66)
- Party: Bloc Québécois

Gilbert Fillion (27 July 1940 in Sainte-Anne-de-Chicoutimi, Quebec – 27 May 2007 in Quebec City, Quebec) was a member of the House of Commons of Canada from 1993 to 1997. He was a professor by career.

He was elected in the Chicoutimi electoral district under the Bloc Québécois party in the 1993 federal election, thus serving in the 35th Canadian Parliament. He left Canadian politics after being defeated by Progressive Conservative candidate André Harvey in the 1997 federal election.

His son, Jeff Fillion, is a radio broadcaster.

He died of lung cancer on 27 May 2007 in Quebec City.
