= Paul Langlois =

Paul Langlois may refer to:

- Paul Langlois, Canadian musician with The Tragically Hip
- Paul Langlois (politician) (1926–2012), member of Canadian Parliament
