= Festivites Western de Saint-Victor =

The Festivites Western de Saint-Victor (literally, Saint-Victor Western Festival) are held in Saint-Victor, Quebec, Canada, in July of each year since 1978.
