= Alfred Dubuc =

Canadian politician (1871–1947)

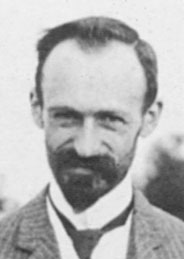

Member of Parliament for Chicoutimi
- In office October 1925 – April 1945
- Preceded by: riding created
- Succeeded by: Paul-Edmond Gagnon

Personal details
- Born: Julien-Édouard-Alfred Dubuc; 21 January 1871 Saint-Hugues, Quebec
- Died: 27 October 1947 (aged 76)
- Party: Independent Liberal; Liberal
- Spouse(s): Anne Marie Palardy m. 21 June 1893
- Profession: bank manager, director, manufacturer

Julien-Édouard-Alfred Dubuc (21 January 1871 – 27 October 1947) was a Canadian businessman and politician. Dubuc was an Independent Liberal and Liberal party member of the House of Commons of Canada. He was born in Saint-Hugues, Quebec, educated at Sherbrooke, and became a bank manager, a director of various companies and a manufacturer.

He was first elected to Parliament at the Chicoutimi riding in the 1925 general election as an Independent Liberal and re-elected on that basis in 1926 federal election. By the 1930 election, he became a member of the Liberal party and was re-elected at Chicoutimi in 1935 and 1940. Dubuc did not seek re-election in 1945 and left Parliament after completing his term in the 19th Canadian Parliament.

Dubuc promoted various projects in the Chicoutimi region including a rail link between Baie-des-Ha!-Ha! and Chicoutimi, and paper mills at Chandler and La Baie. The Dubuc Bridge (Pont Dubuc) across the Saguenay River at Chicoutimi was named in his honour.
