= Richard Martel =

Canadian politician

The Honourable Richard Martel
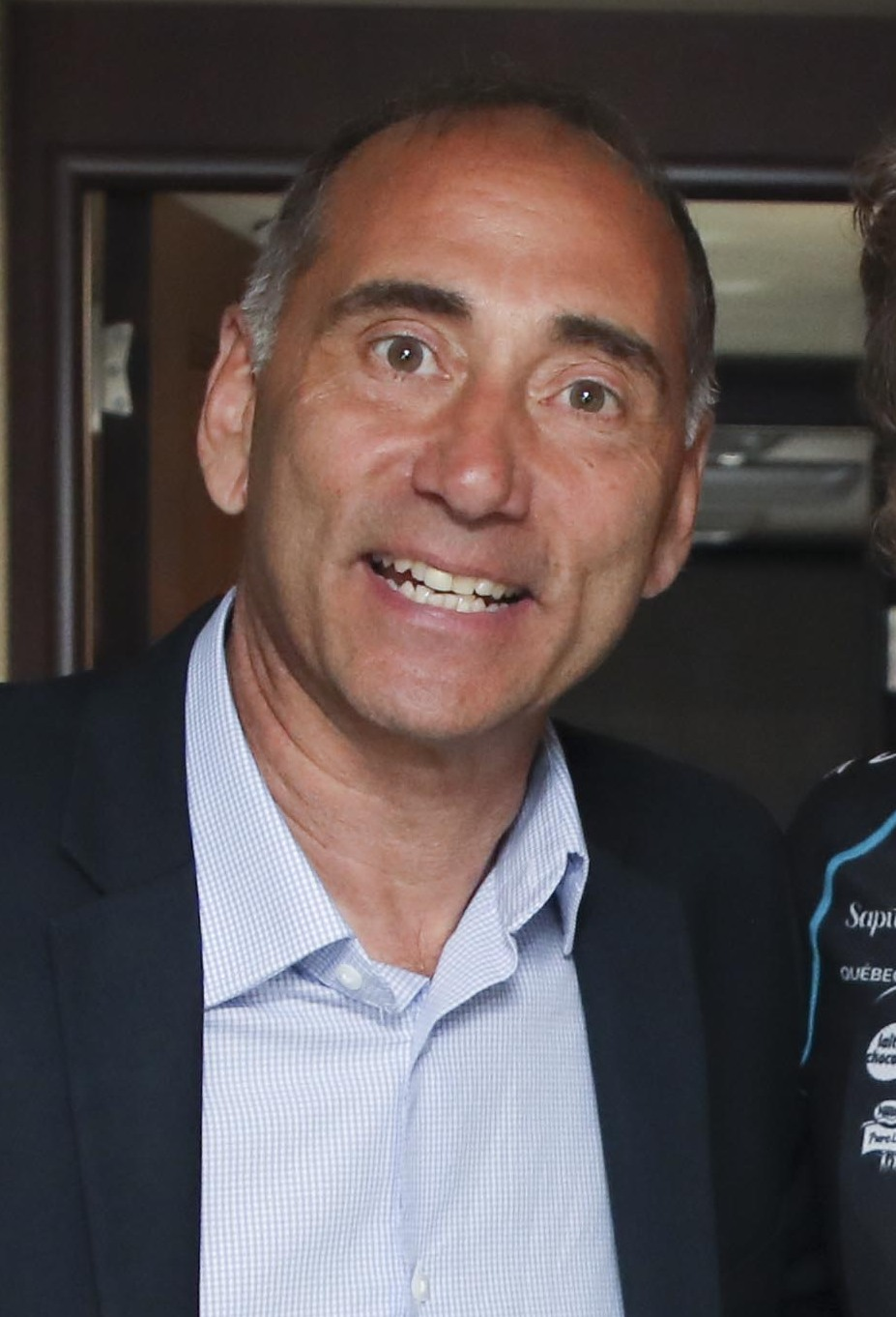
- Martel in 2018

Canadian Senator from Quebec (Rougemont)
- Incumbent
- Assumed office 24 July 2026
- Nominated by: Mark Carney
- Appointed by: Louise Arbour
- Preceded by: Marie-Françoise Mégie

Member of Parliament for Chicoutimi—Le Fjord
- In office 18 June 2018 – 7 July 2026
- Preceded by: Denis Lemieux
- Succeeded by: Daniel Gobeil

Personal details
- Born: 23 March 1961 (age 65) Chicoutimi, Quebec, Canada
- Party: Conservative
- Other political affiliations: Independent (2026)
- Spouse: Annie Houle
- Occupation: Ice hockey coach
Ice hockey career
- Coached for: Saint-Hyacinthe Laser; Val-d'Or Foreurs; Baie-Comeau Drakkar; Chicoutimi Sagueneens; Brûleurs de Loups (France)
- Coaching career: 1993–2015

Richard Martel (born 23 March 1961) is a Canadian politician and former ice hockey coach who has served as a senator from Quebec (Rougemont) since 2026. Before his appointment to the Senate on the advice of Prime Minister Mark Carney, Martel was a member of Parliament (MP) with the Conservative Party, representing Chicoutimi—Le Fjord in the House of Commons from 2018 to 2026.

He last coached the Grenoble Brûleurs de Loups in the French Ligue Magnus. Between 1993 and 2011, Martel served as a head coach in the Quebec Major Junior Hockey League (QMJHL).

== Coaching career ==
Martel was an assistant coach under Jos Canale from 1991 to 1993 in Chicoutimi. Between 1993 and 2011, Martel served as a head coach in the QMJHL where he twice won the Ron Lapointe Trophy as the QMJHL coach of the year. On 28 February 2010, Martel became the most successful coach in the history of the QMJHL when he coached the Chicoutimi Saguenéens to a 3–1 victory over the Baie-Comeau Drakkar to win his 570th QMJHL game, surpassing the record previously held by Guy Chouinard.

=== Coaching record ===
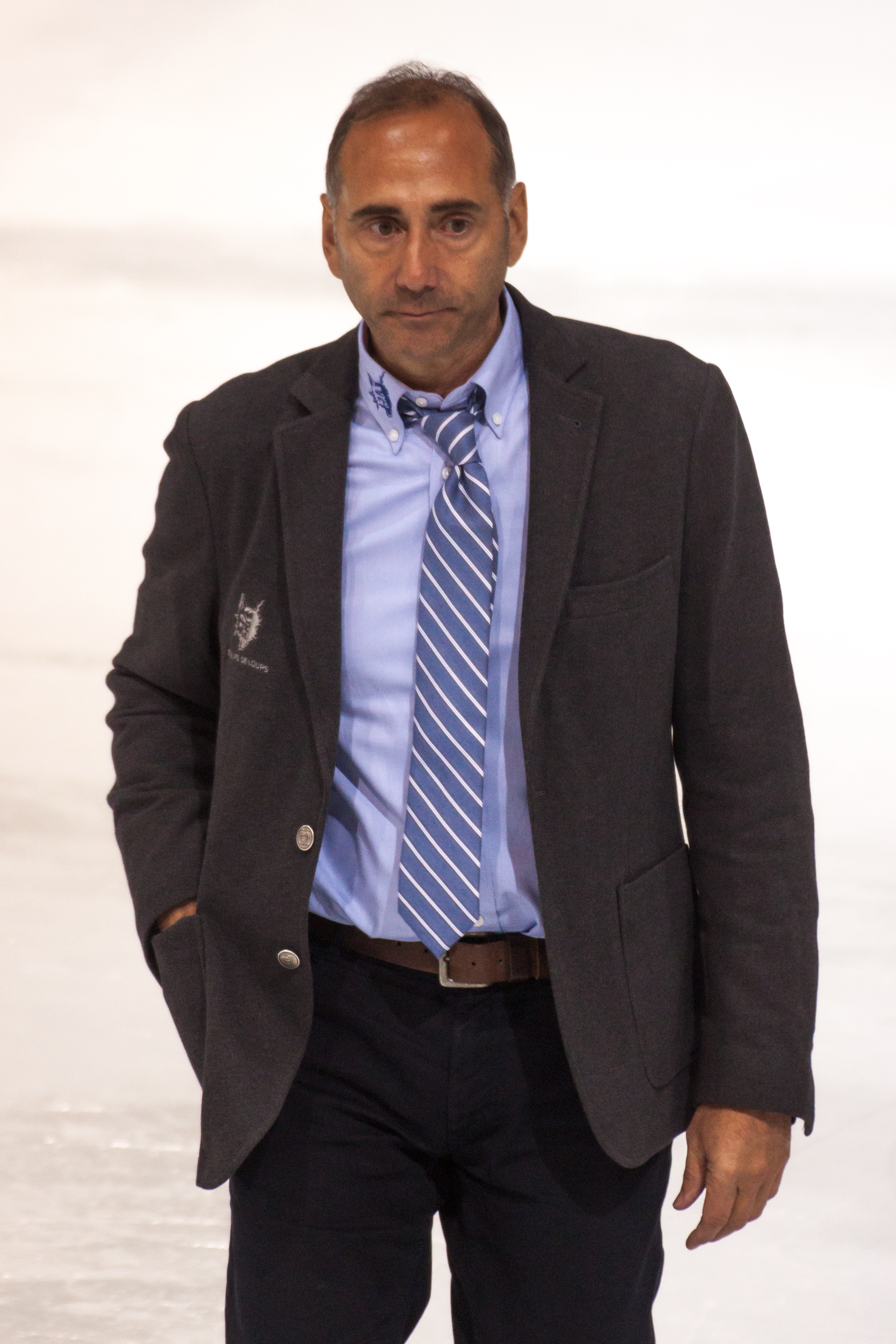
Martel in 2014

==== QMJHL ====
Team	Year	Regular season							Post Season
Team	Year	G	W	L	T	OTL	W-L%	Finish	Result
Saint-Hyacinthe	1993-94	72	35	30	7	0	.535	4th in Lebel	Eliminated - Round 1
Saint-Hyacinthe	1994-95	72	26	42	4	0	.389	5th in Lebel	Eliminated - Round 1
Val-d'Or	1995-96	70	39	24	7	0	.607	3rd in Lebel	Eliminated - Round 2
Val-d'Or	1996-97	70	40	28	2	0	.586	3rd in Lebel	Eliminated - Semi Finals
Val-d'Or	1997-98	58	29	23	6	0	.552	(replaced mid-season)	—
Baie-Comeau	1998-99	53	17	32	4	0	.358	7th in Dilio	Missed playoffs
Baie-Comeau	1999-00	72	31	31	5	5	.500	3rd in East	Eliminated - Round 1
Baie-Comeau	2000-01	72	41	23	8	0	.625	1st in East	Eliminated - Semi Finals
Baie-Comeau	2001-02	72	38	25	7	2	.590	2nd in East	Eliminated - Round 1
Baie-Comeau	2002-03	72	50	14	6	2	.750	1st in East	Eliminated - Semi Finals
Chicoutimi	2003-04	42	23	13	5	1	.619	2nd in Eastern	Eliminated - Semi Finals
Chicoutimi	2004-05	70	38	19	6	7	.636	2nd in Eastern	Eliminated - Semi Finals
Chicoutimi	2005-06	70	51	15	0	4	.757	2nd in Western	Eliminated - Round 2
Chicoutimi	2006-07	70	34	28	0	8	.543	8th in Telus	Eliminated - Round 1
Chicoutimi	2007-08	70	37	25	0	8	.585	4th in Telus	Eliminated - Round 1
Chicoutimi	2008-09	68	24	32	0	12	.441	3rd in Telus East	Eliminated - Round 1
Chicoutimi	2009-10	68	26	33	0	9	.449	3rd in Telus East	Eliminated - Round 1
Chicoutimi	2009-10	50	18	22	0	10	.460	(replaced mid-season)	—
Total		1191	597	459	67	68	Win%: .501		

Source: Career profile

=== Awards and honours ===
Award	Year
Ron Lapointe Trophy - QMJHL Coach of the Year	1993–94
Ron Lapointe Trophy - QMJHL Coach of the Year	2004–05

== Political career ==
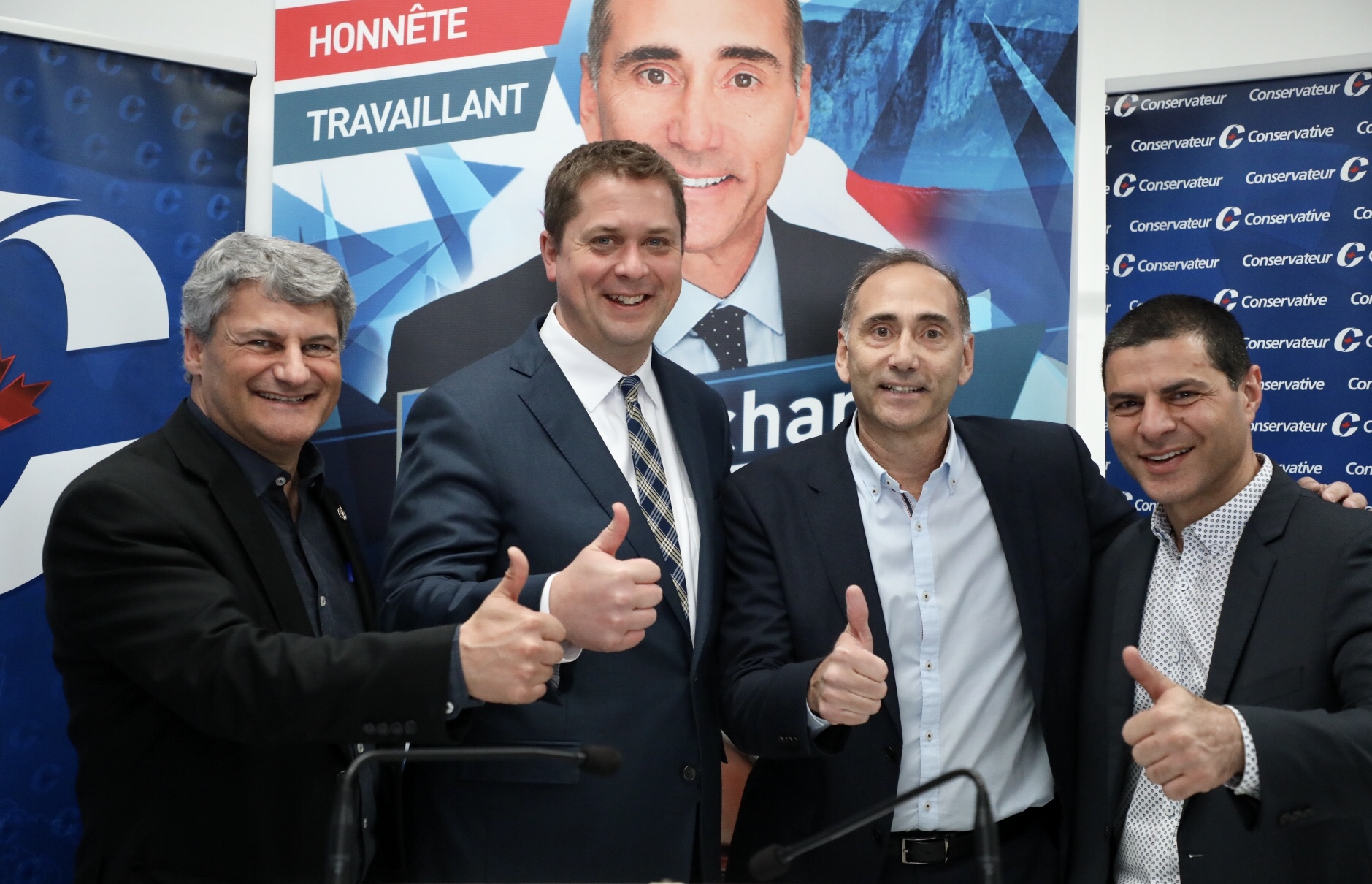
Andrew Scheer at opening of Martel's campaign office

On 20 December 2017, Martel was named the Conservative candidate for an upcoming by-election in the federal electoral district of Chicoutimi—Le Fjord, as a star candidate. Martel was recruited by a former player, Antoine Tardif, who served as the party's chief organizer in Quebec. Martel had previously been courted to run for mayor of Saguenay as well as the National Assembly of Quebec.

Martel was elected as a Member of Parliament on 18 June 2018, gaining the seat from the Liberals.

He was reelected in the 2019 Canadian federal election.

On 2 September 2020, Conservative leader Erin O'Toole announced that Martel would serve as the party's Quebec lieutenant, succeeding Alain Rayes. Martel served in the role until 8 November 2021, when he was succeeded by Rayes.

On 7 July 2026, Prime Minister Mark Carney announced that Martel would be appointed to the Senate; he was officially summoned by Governor General Louise Arbour on 24 July 2026. The by-election to replace him was won by Liberal Daniel Gobeil. On October 6, he rejoined the Conservative caucus in the Senate.

=== Electoral record ===
2025 Canadian federal election: Chicoutimi—Le Fjord
Party	Candidate	Votes	%	±%	Expenditures
Conservative	Richard Martel	17,356	34.14	-6.24	$91,466.24
Bloc Québécois	Marc St-Hilaire	15,857	31.19	-2.88	$44,039.70
Liberal	Stéphane Proulx	15,820	31.12	+12.90	$6,306.74
New Democratic	Raphaël Émond	991	1.95	-2.75	$2,726.02
Green	Yves Laporte	476	0.94	-0.24	$15.96
People's	François Sabourin	339	0.67	-0.70	none listed
Total valid votes/expense limit		50,839	98.60	–	$125,644.80
Total rejected ballots		721	1.40	-0.56	
Turnout		51,560	68.54	+3.89	
Eligible voters		75,229			
Conservative notional hold		Swing		-1.68	
Source: Elections Canada

2021 Canadian federal election: Chicoutimi—Le Fjord
Party	Candidate	Votes	%	±%	Expenditures
Conservative	Richard Martel	17,228	41.01	+4.20	$49,214.19
Bloc Québécois	Julie Bouchard	14,027	33.39	-1.52	$13,745.50
Liberal	Jean Duplain	7,676	18.27	+1.17	$0.00
New Democratic	Ismaël Raymond	1,944	4.63	-1.88	$2,095.41
People's	Jimmy Voyer	649	1.55	+0.73	none listed
Green	Yves Laporte	482	1.15	-2.02	$0.00
Total valid votes/expense limit		42,006	98.14	–	$104,807.38
Total rejected ballots		797	1.86	-0.20	
Turnout		42,803	65.27	-2.88	
Registered voters		65,579			
Conservative hold		Swing		+2.86	
Source: Elections Canada

2019 Canadian federal election: Chicoutimi—Le Fjord
Party	Candidate	Votes	%	±%	Expenditures
Conservative	Richard Martel	16,155	36.82	-15.94	$88,278.98
Bloc Québécois	Valérie Tremblay	15,321	34.91	+29.32	none listed
Liberal	Dajana Dautovic	7,504	17.10	-12.39	$9,048.24
New Democratic	Stéphane Girard	2,855	6.51	-2.14	$1,181.55
Green	Lynda Youde	1,388	3.16	+0.07	$2,988.37
People's	Jimmy Voyer	359	0.82	–	$1,360.01
Rhinoceros	Line Bélanger	299	0.68	–	$0.00
Total valid votes/expense limit		43,881	97.94		
Total rejected ballots		925	2.06	+0.73	
Turnout		44,806	68.15	+31.62	
Eligible voters		65,747			
Conservative hold		Swing		-22.63	
Source: Elections Canada

Canadian federal by-election, June 18, 2018: Chicoutimi—Le Fjord Resignation of Denis Lemieux
Party	Candidate	Votes	%	±%
Conservative	Richard Martel	12,600	52.76	+36.16
Liberal	Lina Boivin	7,044	29.50	-1.60
New Democratic	Éric Dubois	2,065	8.65	-21.07
Bloc Québécois	Catherine Bouchard-Tremblay	1,337	5.60	-14.92
Green	Lynda Youde	738	3.09	+1.02
Independent	John Turmel	98	0.41	
Total valid votes/expense limit		23,882	98.67	
Total rejected ballots		322	1.33	-0.34
Turnout		24,204	36.52	-30.15
Eligible voters		66,267		
Conservative gain from Liberal		Swing		+18.88
Source:Elections Canada: Official Voting Results
