= Paul-Edmond Gagnon =

Canadian politician

Member of Parliament for Chicoutimi
- In office June 1945 – June 1957
- Preceded by: Julien-Édouard-Alfred Dubuc
- Succeeded by: Rosaire Gauthier

Personal details
- Born: 20 January 1909 Saint-Alexis-de-la-Grande-Baie, Quebec, Canada
- Died: 23 October 1981 (aged 72) La Baie, Quebec, Canada
- Party: Independent
- Spouse(s): Blanche Yvette Dufour (m. 6 February 1929)
- Profession: merchant

Paul-Edmond Gagnon (20 January 1909 – 23 October 1981) was an independent member of the House of Commons of Canada. Born in Saint-Alexis-de-la-Grande-Baie, Quebec, he was a merchant by career.

Gagnon was educated at the Chicoutimi Seminary. He was also a member of the Knights of Columbus and the Saint-Jean-Baptiste Society.

He was first elected to Parliament at the Chicoutimi riding in the 1945 general election then re-elected for successive terms in 1949 and 1953. Gagnon was defeated by Rosaire Gauthier of the Liberal party.
