= Rosaire Gauthier =

Canadian politician

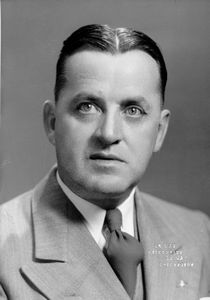

Mayor of Chicoutimi, Quebec
- In office 1950–1964
- Preceded by: Georges-H. Smith
- Succeeded by: Gérard Tremblay

Member of Parliament for Chicoutimi
- In office June 1957 – March 1958
- Preceded by: Paul-Edmond Gagnon
- Succeeded by: Vincent Brassard

Personal details
- Born: 28 February 1904 Chicoutimi, Quebec, Canada
- Died: 15 December 1992 (aged 88)
- Party: Liberal
- Profession: businessman, industrialist

Rosaire Gauthier (28 February 1904 – 15 December 1992) was a Canadian politician, the mayor of Chicoutimi, Quebec and a Liberal party member of the House of Commons of Canada. He was born in Chicoutimi, Quebec and became a businessman and industrialist.

Gauthier was mayor of Chicoutimi from 1950 to 1964. During this time, he was elected at the Chicoutimi riding in the 1957 general election. After serving his only federal term, the 23rd Canadian Parliament, he was defeated by Vincent Brassard of the Progressive Conservative party in the 1958 election.
