= Vincent Brassard =

Canadian politician

Member of the Canadian Parliament for Chicoutimi
- In office 1958–1962
- Preceded by: Rosaire Gauthier
- Succeeded by: Maurice Côté

Personal details
- Born: 10 December 1919 Chicoutimi, Quebec, Canada
- Died: 7 April 1974 (aged 54) Chicoutimi, Quebec, Canada
- Party: Progressive Conservative Party
- Spouse(s): Judith Voyer (m. 19 Jun 1943)
- Occupation: Politician, manufacturer, meat packer

Joseph Léonce Vincent Brassard (10 December 1919 – 7 April 1974) was a Canadian politician, manufacturer and meat packer. He was born in Chicoutimi, Quebec, Canada. He was elected to the House of Commons of Canada in 1958 as a Member of the Progressive Conservative Party to represent the riding of Chicoutimi. He was defeated in the elections of 1962 and 1965. He married Judith Voyer (died 1998) and had 10 children. Brassard died in Chicoutimi in 1974.
