= Robert Bouchard =

Canadian politician

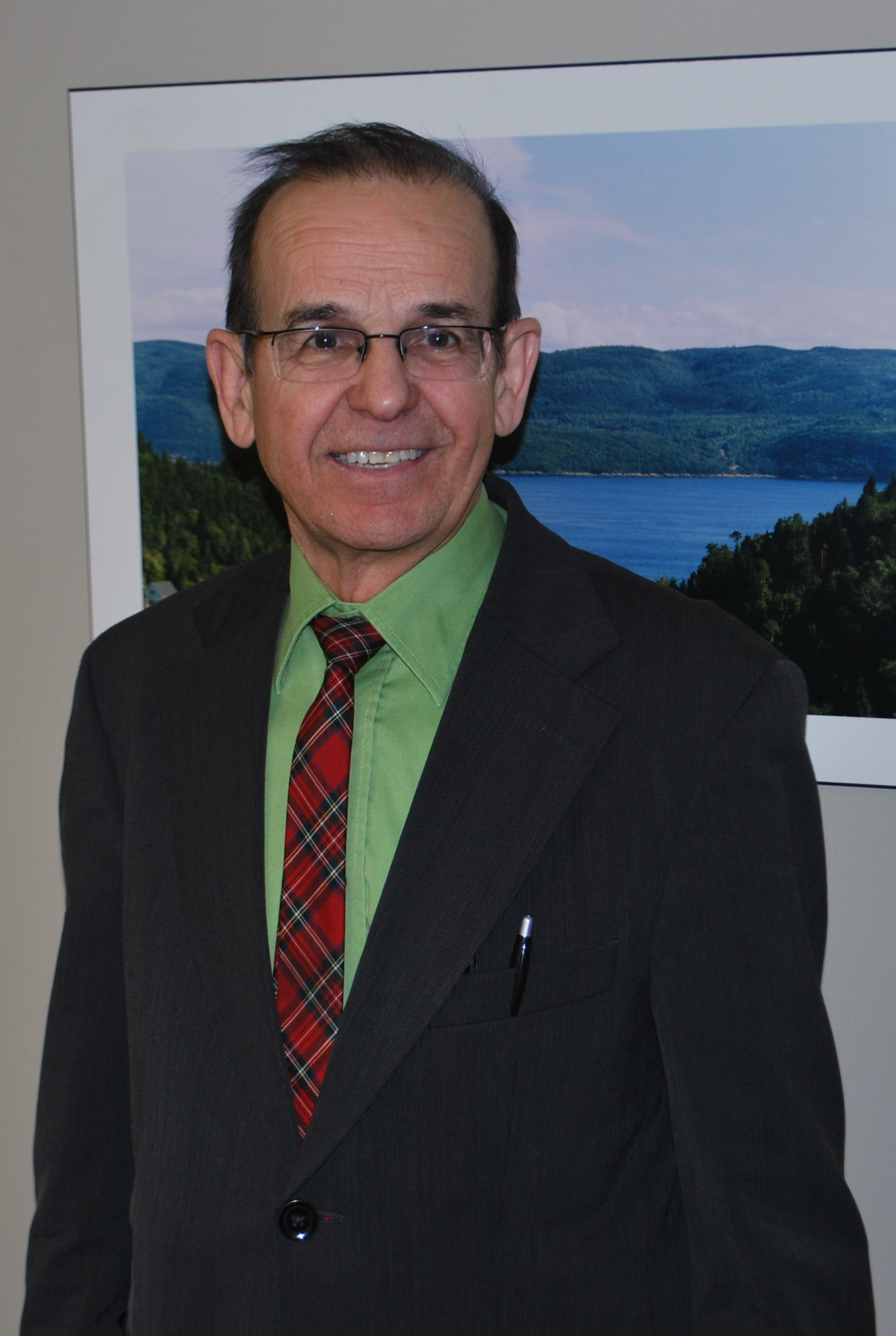

Member of Parliament for Chicoutimi—Le Fjord
- In office 2004–2011
- Preceded by: André Harvey
- Succeeded by: Dany Morin

Personal details
- Born: March 30, 1943 (age 83) Saint-Edmond-les-Plaines, Quebec
- Party: Bloc Québécois
- Profession: director, secretary-treasurer

Robert Bouchard (born March 30, 1943) is a Canadian politician. Born in Saint-Émond, Quebec, Bouchard represented the riding of Chicoutimi—Le Fjord in the House of Commons of Canada from 2004 to 2011 as a member of the Bloc Québécois.

Bouchard served as the Bloc Québécois critic for National Revenue.
