= Paul Brassard =

American politician

Member of New Hampshire House of Representatives for Hillsborough 17th district
- In office 2004–2006

Member of New Hampshire House of Representatives for Hillsborough 50th district
- In office 2002–2004

Personal details
- Party: Republican

Paul Brassard is an American politician. He was a member of the New Hampshire House of Representatives.

Brassard was part of the Donald Trump 2024 presidential campaign in New Hampshire.
