= Saint-Victor, Quebec =

Saint-Victor
- Municipality
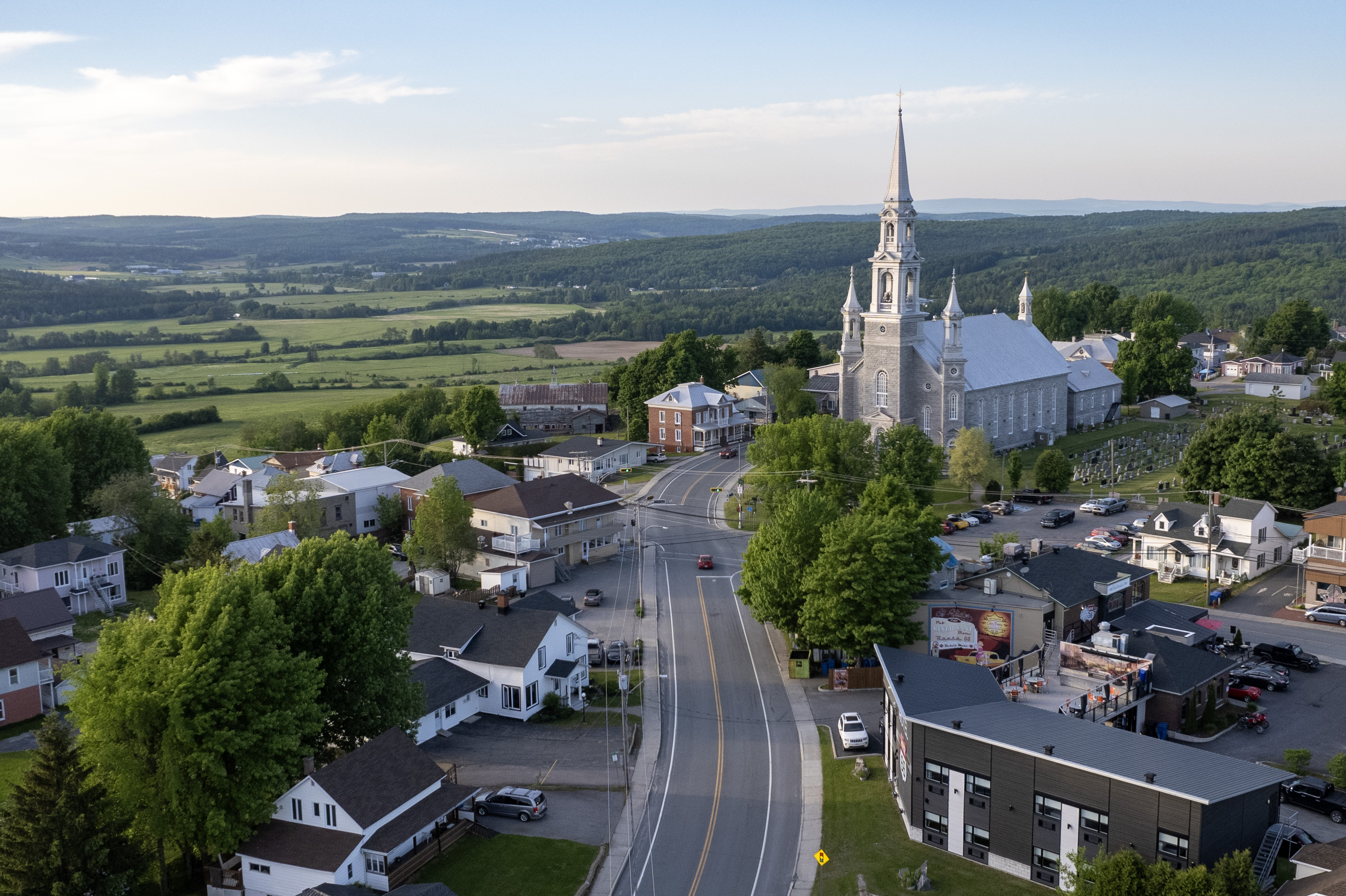
- Aerial view of Saint-Victor

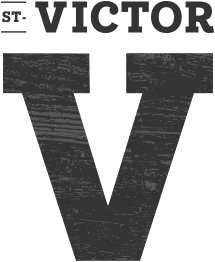
- Coat of arms
- Motto: S'unir pour bâtir (French: United to Build)
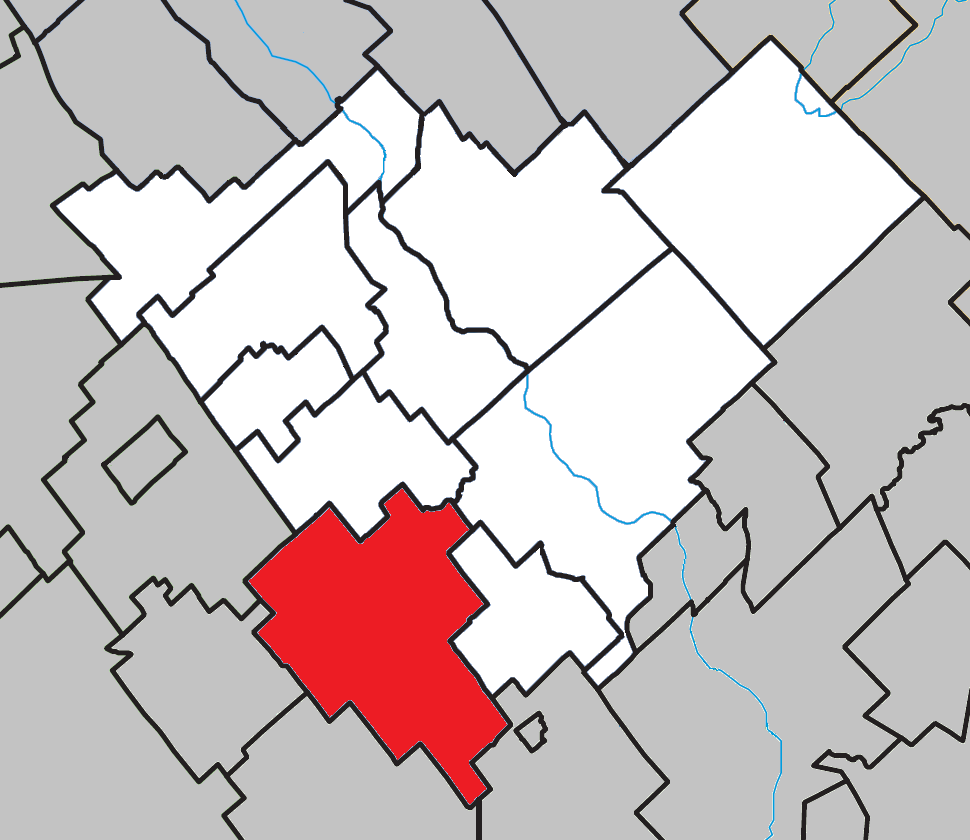
- Location within Beauce-Centre RCM.

- Location in southern Quebec.
- Coordinates: 46°09′N 70°54′W
- Country: Canada
- Province: Quebec
- Region: Chaudière-Appalaches
- RCM: Beauce-Centre
- Founded: February 24, 1852
- Constituted: December 31, 1996

Government
  - Mayor: Jonathan V. Bolduc
  - Federal riding: Beauce
  - Prov. riding: Beauce-Nord

Area
  - Total: 121.80 km^{2} (47.03 sq mi)
  - Land: 120.45 km^{2} (46.51 sq mi)

Population (2021)
  - Total: 2,313
  - Density: 19.2/km^{2} (50/sq mi)
  - Pop 2016-2021: ▼5.5%
  - Dwellings: 1,198
- Time zone: UTC−5 (EST)
  - Summer (DST): UTC−4 (EDT)
- Postal code(s): G0M 2B0
- Area codes: 418 and 581
- Highways: R-108; R-271
- Website: www.st-victor.qc.ca

Saint-Victor (French pronunciation: [sɛ̃ viktɔʁ]) is a municipality in the Beauce-Centre Regional County Municipality in the centre of the Beauce area, part of the Chaudière-Appalaches administrative region in Quebec, Canada. Saint-Victor's population is 2,313.

It was created in 1996 from the merger of the village of Saint-Victor and the municipality of Saint-Victor-de-Tring.

== History ==
The area was first settled as Tring township municipality, established in 1804. Colonization peaked between 1834 and 1838. Settlers came from the neighboring areas of Saint-François (Beauceville), Saint-Joseph-de-Beauce, Lauzon, and Bellechasse.

The Tring township municipality was created in 1845, dissolved in 1847, and reestablished in 1855. In 1864 it split into the Saint-Victor-de-Tring and Saint-Éphrem-de-Tring municipalities. Saint-Victor-de-Tring was named after a Catholic parish, which was established in 1848 and became canonical in 1852. The parish included parts of Saint-François-de-Beauce parish and of Tring and Broughton townships. It was named after Pope Saint Victor I because the first chapel's construction started on July 28, Saint Victor's feast day.

On March 1, 1922, Saint-Victor-de-Tring split into two municipalities, the village and the parish. Originally called Saint-Victor-de-Tring, the village municipality was renamed Saint-Victor in 1955. On December 31, 1996, the municipalities of the village and the parish merged again to form the current municipality of Saint-Victor.

Fires destroyed much of the village in 1897, 1916, 1931, 1941, 1948 and 1958.

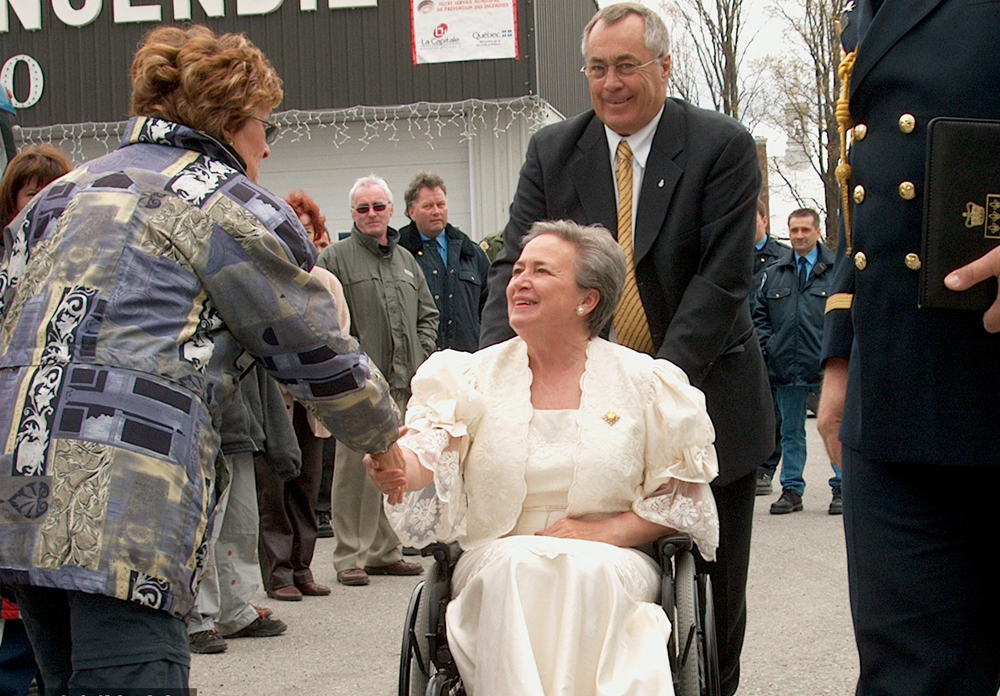
The Honorable Lise Thibault, Lieutenant Governor of Quebec, visiting Saint-Victor in 2002

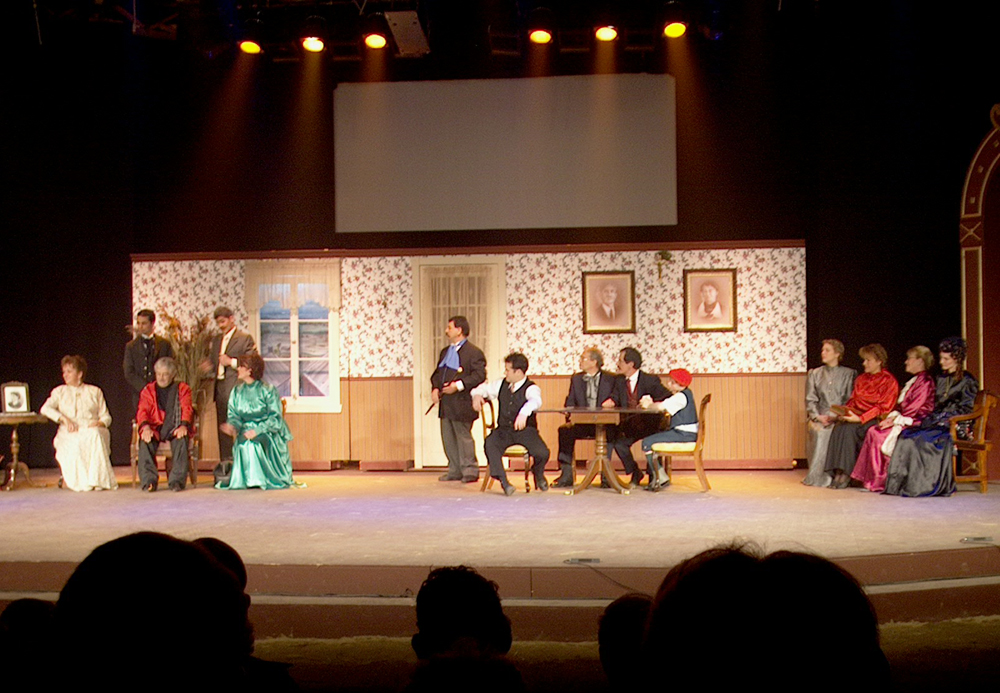
Désir de Vivre, a historical play presented for Saint-Victor's 150th anniversary in 2002

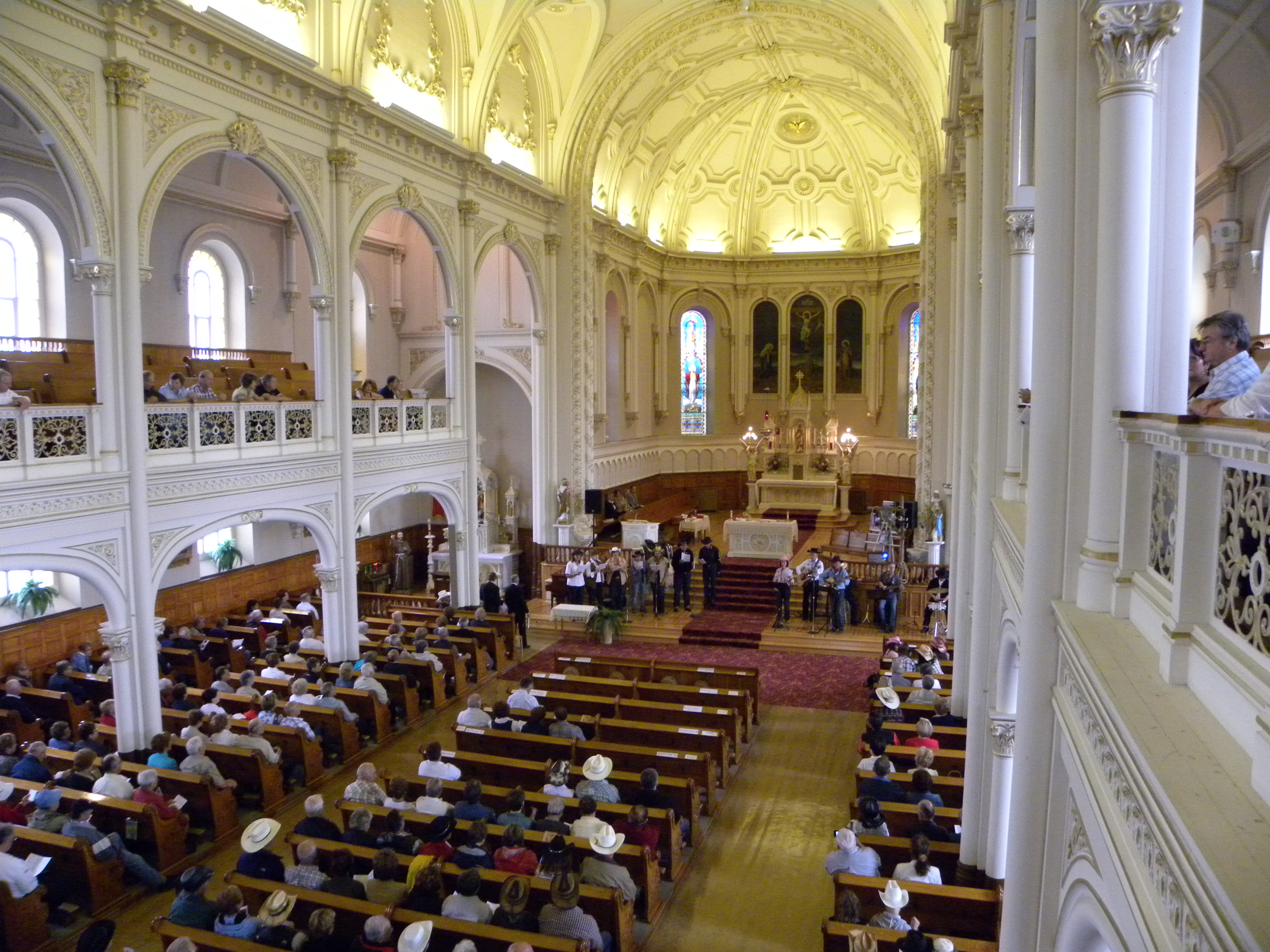
Saint-Victor's church holding Mass in 2009

== Geography ==
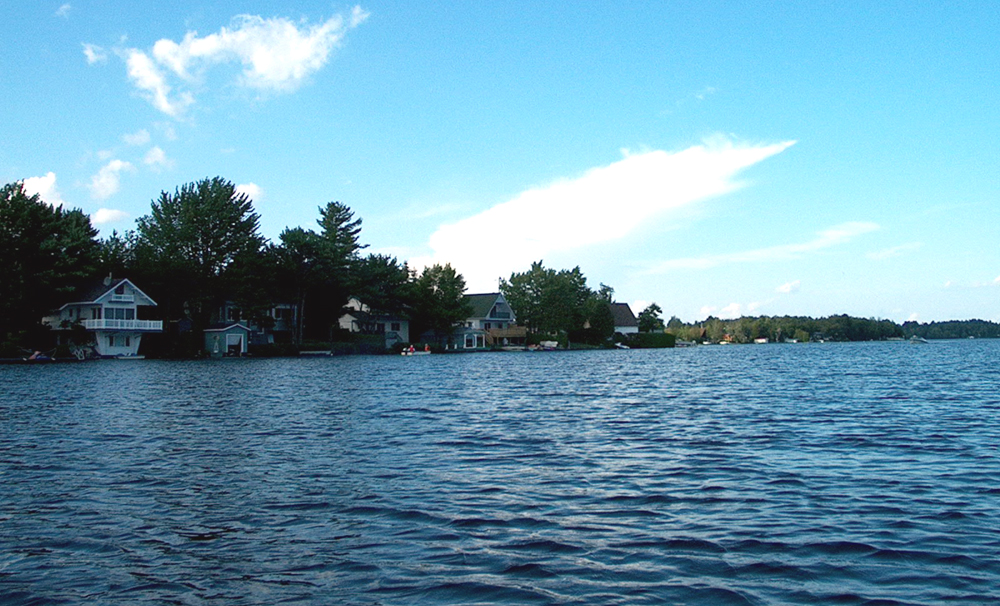
Houses and chalets surrounding Lac Fortin

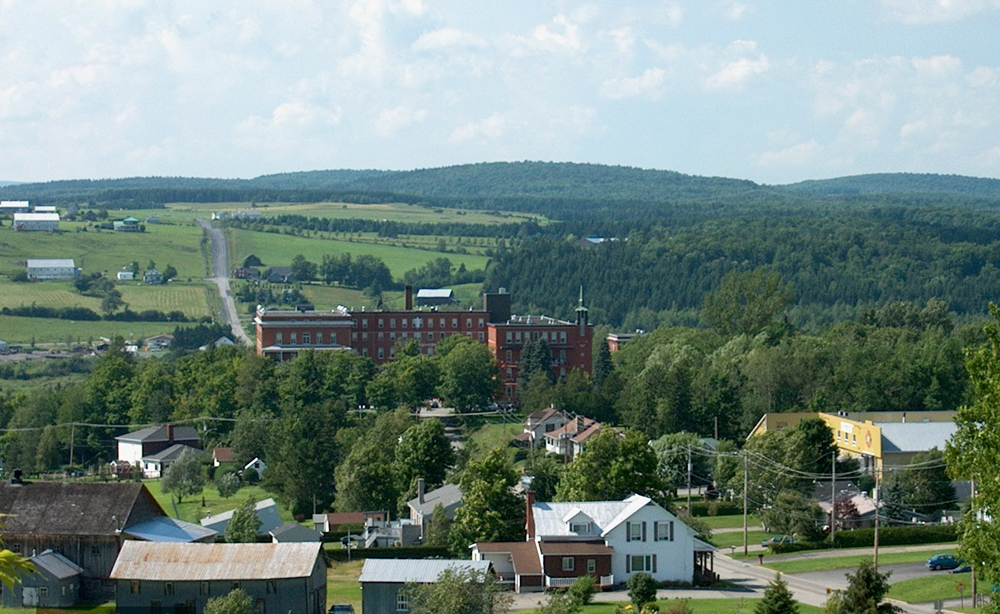
Valley and Séminaire du Sacré-Coeur

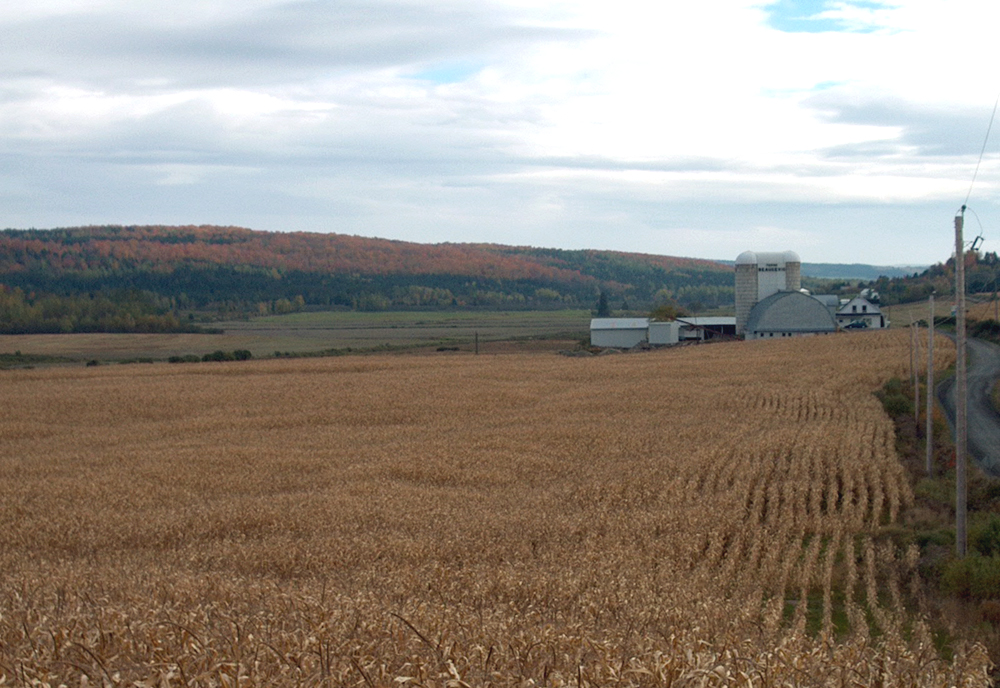
Countryside in autumn (Ferme Beaucevic)

The village of Saint-Victor sits on a hill above the Le Bras Saint-Victor river valley. The nearby Lac Fortin, the largest lake in Beauce, is 2.2 kilometres (1.4 mi) long and surrounded by houses and chalets. Another lake, Lac aux Cygnes, is shared between the municipalities of Saint-Victor and Saint-Benoît-Labre. The smaller Lac Castor lies between the two other lakes. The municipality of Saint-Victor is 55 percent forested.

== Demographics ==
In the 2021 Census of Population conducted by Statistics Canada, Saint-Victor had a population of 2,313 living in 1,025 of its 1,198 total private dwellings, a change of −5.5% from its 2016 population of 2,448. With a land area of 120.45 km^{2} (46.51 sq mi), it had a population density of 19.2/km^{2} (49.7/sq mi) in 2021.

Population trend

Census	Population	Change (%)
2021	2,313	▼5.5%
2016	2,448	▼0.1%
2011	2,451	▼4.0%
2006	2,553	▲3.8%
2001	2,460	N/A

== Economy ==
Saint-Victor had an economic boom in the 1990s, when the relative weakness of the Canadian dollar helped local businesses increase exports to the United States. In the mid-2000s, exports declined when the Canadian dollar strengthened and Asian textile quotas ended. But residential construction continues, and the population has been rising every year.

== Arts and culture ==
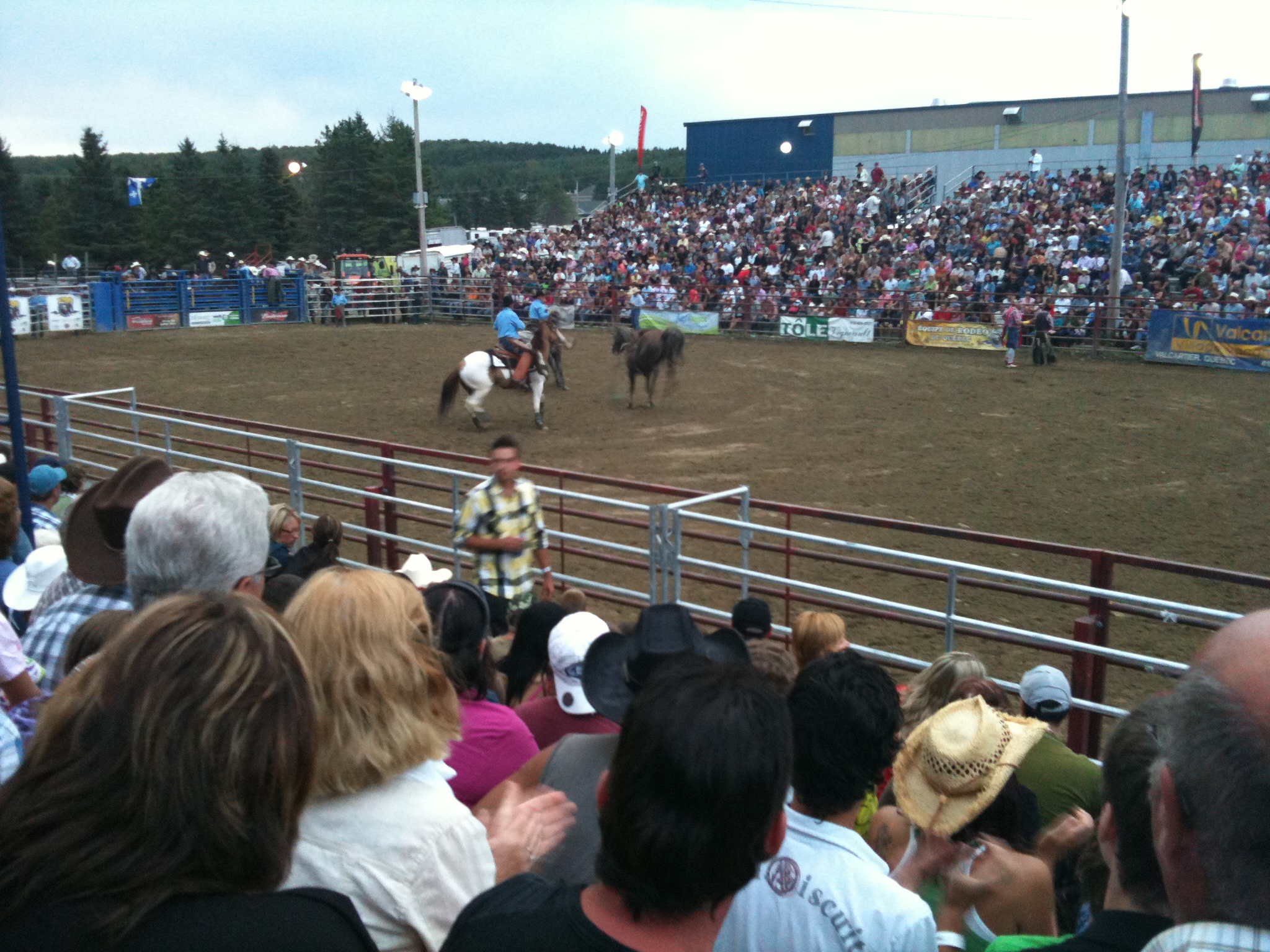
Festivités Western in 2010

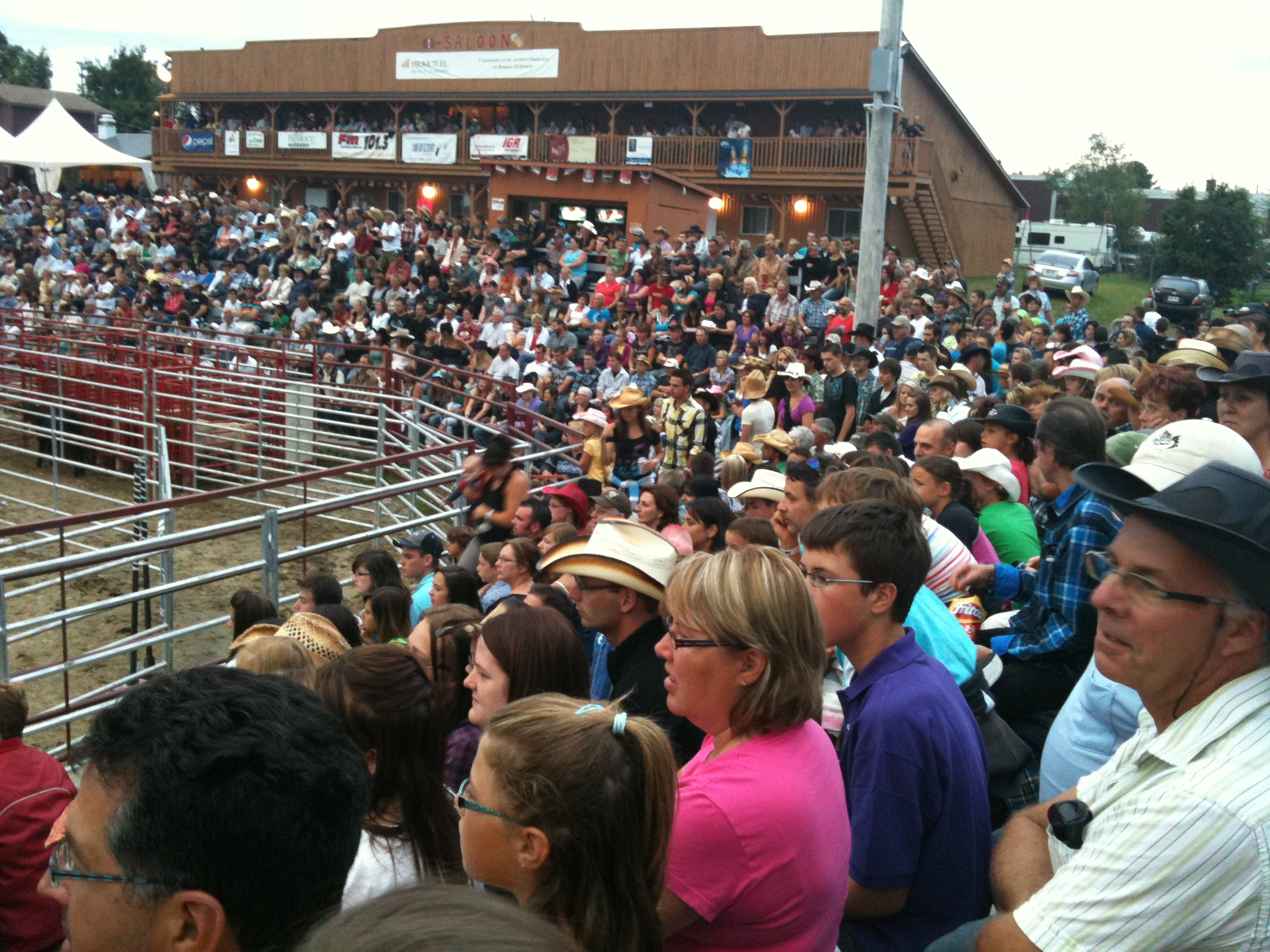
Saloon and rodeo, Festivités Western 2010

- A Car Demolition Derby has been held annually in mid-July for over 30 years on the Bar Chez Jessie parking lot.
- A rodeo, Festivites Western de Saint-Victor ("Saint-Victor Western Festival"), has been held every July since 1978, attracting 50,000 visitors for the week.
- An outdoor swimming and boating event, La Traversée du Lac Fortin, is held yearly at the end of July.
- La Course à obstacles is an amateur car race in a sand pit, held annually in mid-August.

== Infrastructure ==
- Quebec Route 108, a provincial highway, crosses the municipality of Saint-Victor.
- The Saint-Victor-de-Beauce Aerodrome, a small private airport, is operated by the Club Aéronautique Doyon Inc.
- From 1892 to 1992, the Tring-Megantic subdivision of the Quebec Central Railway served Saint-Victor.

== Education ==
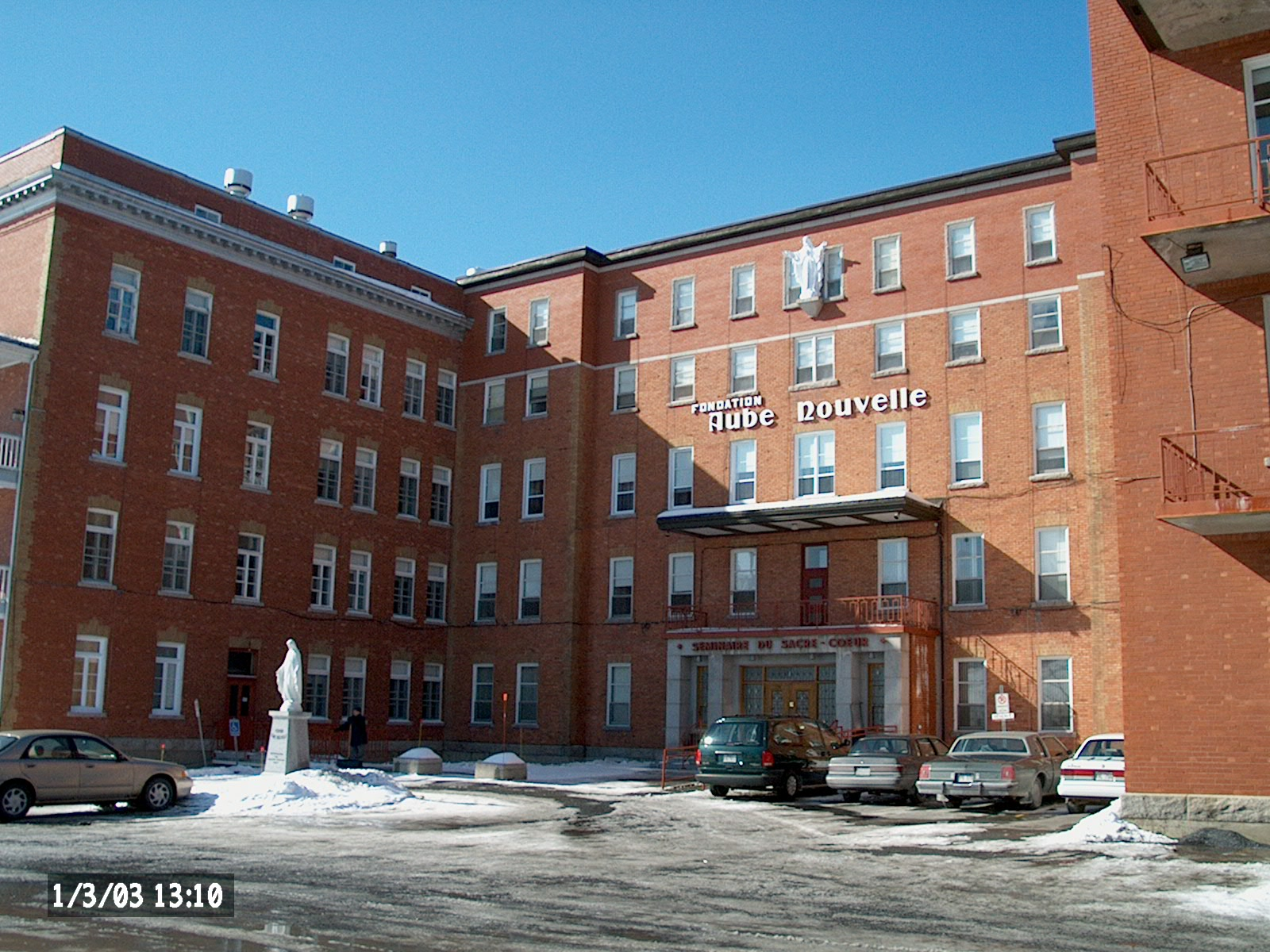
Séminaire du Sacré-Coeur, today the Aube Nouvelle nursing home

In 1903 the Congregations of the Heart of Mary of the Sister-Servants of the Immaculate Heart of Mary opened a convent school, which burned down on June 6, 1931. A new convent school built in 1932 burned down in Saint-Victor's fire of 1948. A third convent school built in 1949 closed in 1967 as schools were consolidated. Another convent school in the station neighborhood closed in 1965 and was sold to Victor Woolen Ltd. Boys were not allowed in convent schools after 6th grade but were taught in private homes. The Champlain school for boys was built in 1957 and closed in 1972 when schools were further consolidated. A unified institution, the École Centrale (Central School), replaced all these schools, opening in January 1965 and adding seven new classes in 1967. In 1987 it was renamed "École Le Tremplin."

Along with other local school boards, the Commission Scolaire de Saint-Victor merged into the Commission Scolaire de Beauceville in July 1972.

A seminary, the Séminaire du Sacré-Coeur, taught men from 1918 until 1975. In 1977 it became a nursing home operated by Fondation Aube-Nouvelle.

== Notable people ==
=== Born in Saint-Victor ===
- The village mayor, The Honourable Joseph Bolduc, later became Speaker of the Senate of Canada and a privy councillor. He was born in Saint-Victor on June 22, 1847, and died there on August 13, 1924.
- The ethnographer and writer Luc Lacourcière, a Companion of the Order of Canada, was born on October 18, 1910.
- The bonesetter Noël Lessard was born in 1911 and died in 1990.
- Arthur Doyon, son of Gédéon Doyon and Anna Rodrigue was born November 15, 1915, and died in Rouyn-Noranda September 8, 1987. Mining prospector and renowned businessman. Among others, he explored Abitibi: the Doyon mine, said Odyno, then second gold producer in Canada.
- Major Fernand Rancourt was born in Saint-Victor on April 26, 1917, died in Saint-Georges on February 13, 1991, and was buried in Saint-Victor. A Royal Canadian Air Force pilot in World War II, he attacked a cargo ship along the Normandy coast, shot a Nazi airplane, and was credited for sinking a Nazi ship in the North Sea. He was awarded the Distinguished Flying Cross, a military decoration.
- Normand Lapointe represented Beauce electoral district in the House of Commons of Canada from 1980 to 1984. He was born in Saint-Victor on January 2, 1939, and still lives there.
- The poet, painter, and printmaker Robbert Fortin was born on March 14, 1946, and died in Montreal on April 14, 2008.
- The caricaturist Yves Lessard was born in Saint-Victor.

=== Lived or lives in Saint-Victor ===
- The naturalist Léon Provancher was Saint-Victor's first parish priest.
- The author Caroline Fortier (née Bouchette), who used the pen name "Maxine," wrote some children's books and historical chronicles at Saint-Victor's Lac Fortin.
- The writer Jean-Marc Cormier lived in Saint-Victor in 1961 and 1962.
- Karolin Métivier, figure skater, was born October 16, 1986, in Saint-Georges' hospital but has been living in Saint-Victor since then. He has been a member of Équipe du Québec from 2001 to 2009, took part at seven Canadian championships and many international championships including Japan, Denmark and the USA. He got the second place in the 2002 Canada Games and has been Quebec senior champion in 2008.
- The author Pierre Barthe lives in the municipality of Saint-Victor.
- The photographer Jérôme Bourque lives in the municipality of Saint-Victor.

== Photos ==
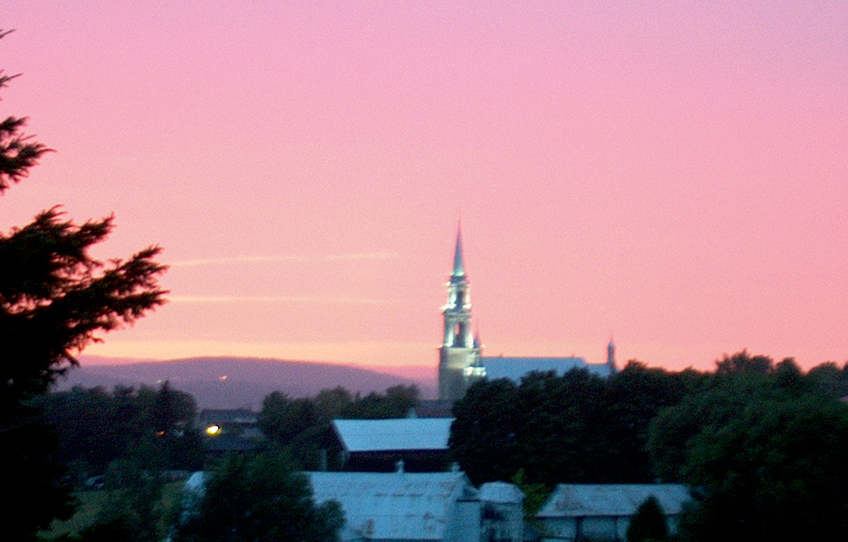
Church at sunset

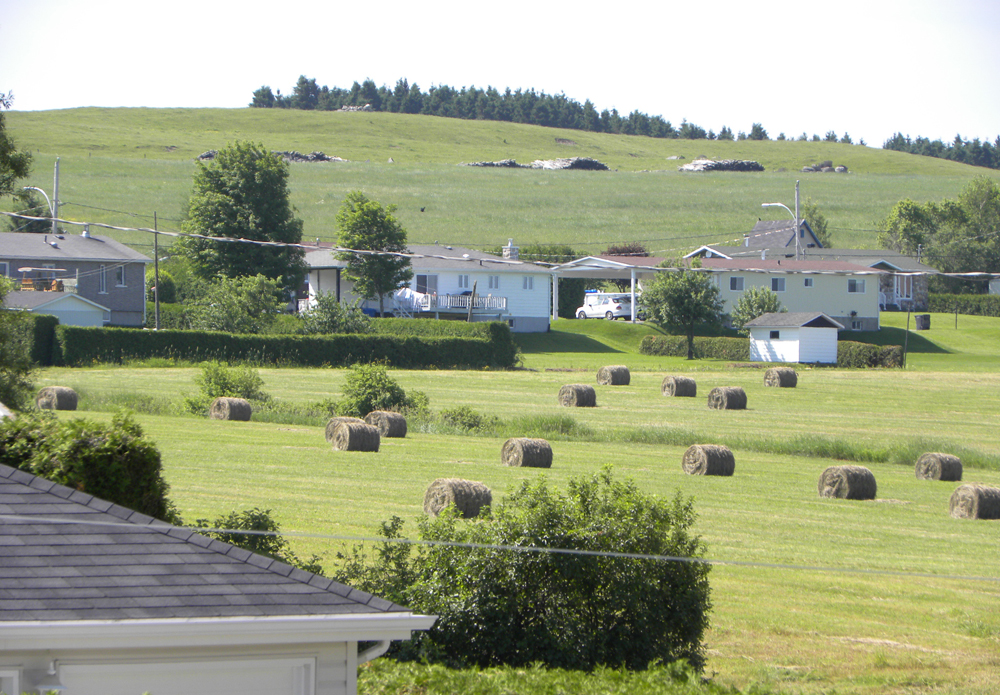
Houses and farms

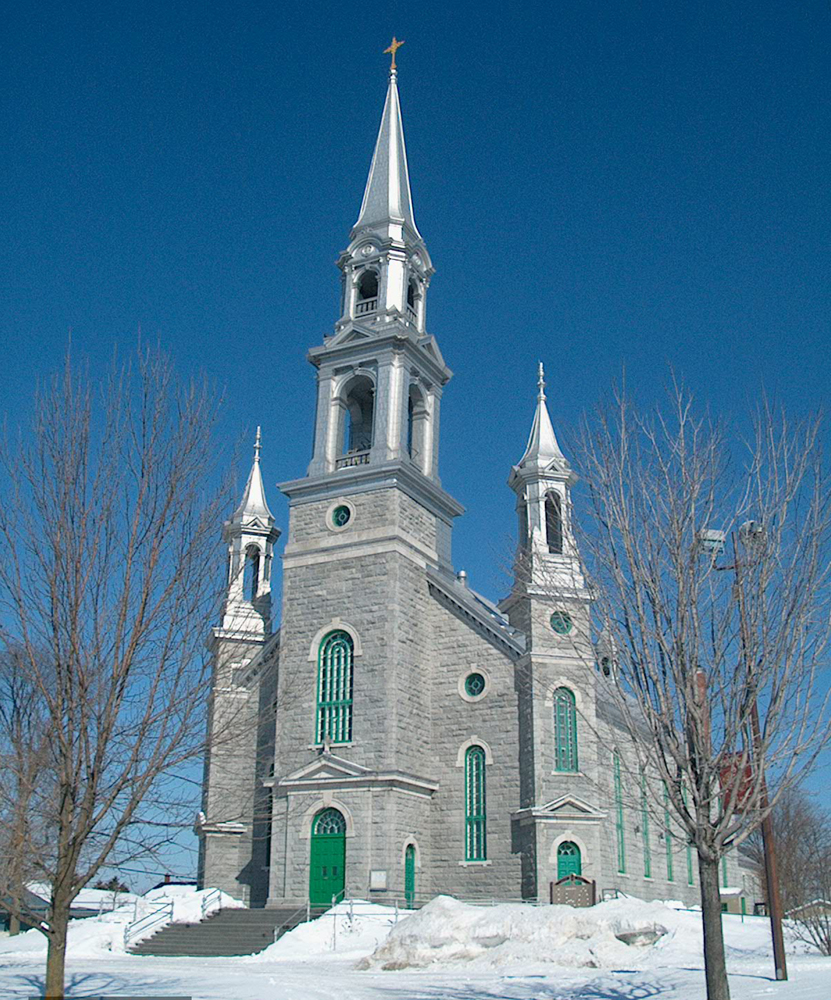
Church in winter

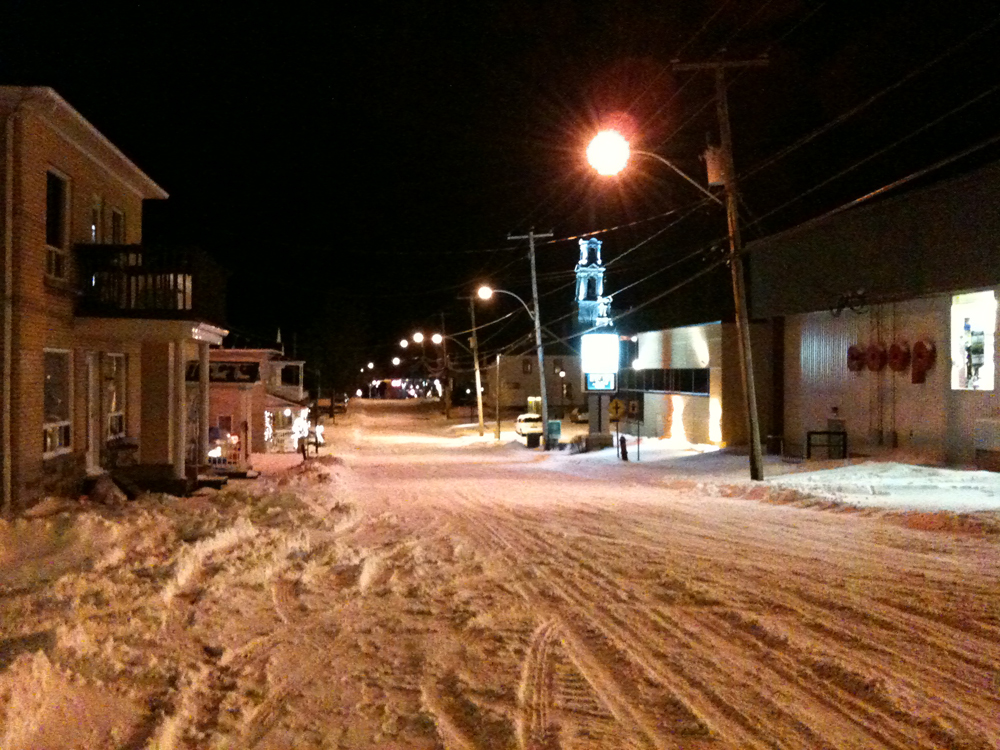
First snow on Commerciale Street

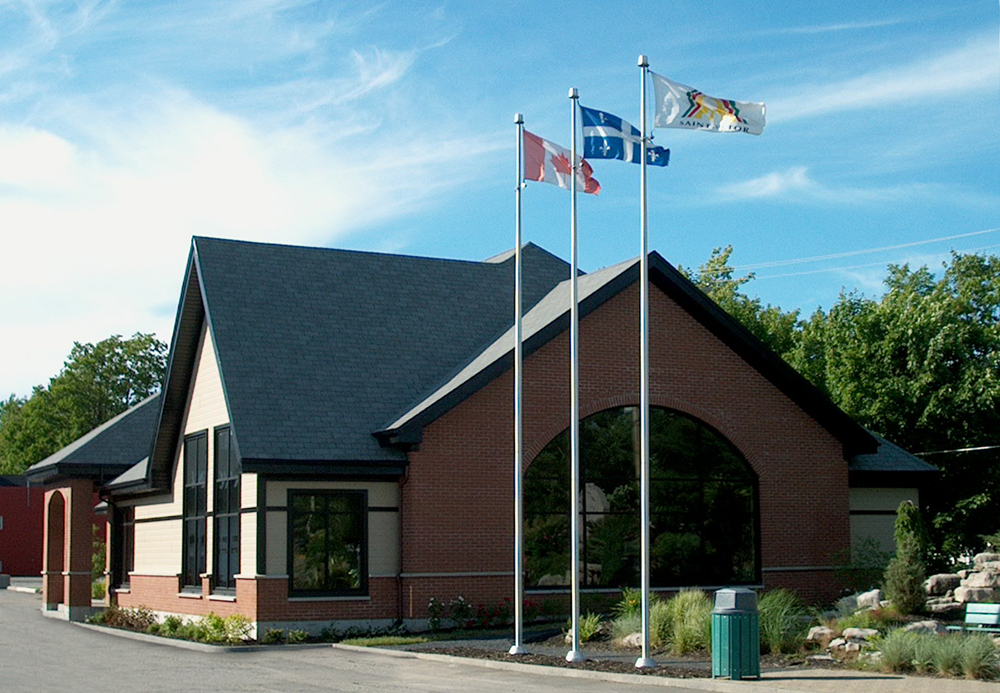
City Hall and Public Library
