= Chicoutimi—Le Fjord =

Federal electoral district in Quebec, Canada

Coordinates: 48.14°N 70.60°W

Quebec electoral district
- Interactive map of riding boundaries from the 2025 federal election

Federal electoral district
- Legislature: House of Commons
MP
Daniel Gobeil
Liberal
- District created: 1924
- First contested: 1925
- Last contested: 2026
- District webpage: profile, map

Demographics
- Population (2016): 81,639
- Electors (2019): 65,618
- Area (km²): 2,819
- Pop. density (per km²): 29
- Census division(s): Le Fjord-du-Saguenay RCM, Saguenay
- Census subdivision(s): Saguenay (part), Saint-Honoré, Saint-David-de-Falardeau, Saint-Fulgence, L'Anse-Saint-Jean, Saint-Félix-d'Otis, Ferland-et-Boilleau, Petit-Saguenay, Sainte-Rose-du-Nord, Rivière-Éternité

Chicoutimi—Le Fjord (formerly known as Chicoutimi) is a federal electoral district in Quebec, Canada, that has been represented in the House of Commons of Canada since 1925. The riding consists of the northern part of the Chicoutimi borough of Saguenay, as well as the La Baie borough and the municipalities of Ferland-et-Boilleau, L'Anse-Saint-Jean, Petit-Saguenay, Rivière-Éternité and Saint-Félix-d'Otis and the unorganized territory of Lalemant.

It was created as "Chicoutimi" riding in 1924 from Chicoutimi—Saguenay. It was renamed "Chicoutimi—Le Fjord" in 2000.

The neighbouring ridings are Côte-Nord—Kawawachikamach—Nitassinan, Montmorency—Charlevoix, and Jonquière—Hébertville—Pays-des-Bleuets.

Following the 2022 Canadian federal electoral redistribution, the riding gained the municipalities of Saint-David-de-Falardeau, Sainte-Rose-du-Nord, Saint-Fulgence, and Saint-Honoré from Jonquière.

== Geography ==
The riding has always been centred on the city (now borough) of Chicoutimi, Quebec. When it was created, the riding consisted of Chicoutimi County until 1947, when the western half of the riding became the new riding of Lapointe. The 1976 redistribution removed all of the riding's territory north of the Saguenay River. This territory was added back to the riding in the 2003 redistribution. This riding lost some territory to Jonquière during the 2012 electoral redistribution, including much of the area north of the Saguenay River again.

== Demographics ==
According to the 2021 Canadian census, 2023 representation order

Race: 93.8% White, 3.9% Indigenous, 1.1% Black
Languages: 97.8% French, 1.3% English
Religion: 77.8% Christian (71.3% Catholic, 6.5% Other), 21.2% None
Median income: $40,400 (2020)
Average income: $48,480 (2020)

== Members of Parliament ==
This riding has elected the following members of Parliament:

Parliament	Years	Member	Party
Chicoutimi; Riding created from Chicoutimi—Saguenay
15th	1925–1926	Alfred Dubuc	Liberal
16th	1926–1930	Alfred Dubuc	Liberal
17th	1930–1935	Alfred Dubuc	Liberal
18th	1935–1940	Alfred Dubuc	Liberal
19th	1940–1945	Alfred Dubuc	Liberal
20th	1945–1949	Paul-Edmond Gagnon	Independent
21st	1949–1953	Paul-Edmond Gagnon	Independent
22nd	1953–1957	Paul-Edmond Gagnon	Independent
23rd	1957–1958	Rosaire Gauthier	Liberal
24th	1958–1962	Vincent Brassard	Progressive Conservative
25th	1962–1963	Maurice Côté	Social Credit
26th	1963–1963	Maurice Côté	Social Credit
26th	1963–1965	Maurice Côté	Ralliement créditiste
27th	1965–1968	Paul Langlois	Liberal
28th	1968–1972	Paul Langlois	Liberal
29th	1972–1974	Paul Langlois	Liberal
30th	1974–1979	Paul Langlois	Liberal
31st	1979–1980	Marcel Dionne	Liberal
32nd	1980–1984	Marcel Dionne	Liberal
33rd	1984–1988	André Harvey	Progressive Conservative
34th	1988–1993	André Harvey	Progressive Conservative
35th	1993–1997	Gilbert Fillion	Bloc Québécois
36th	1997–2000	André Harvey	Progressive Conservative
36th	2000–2000	André Harvey	Independent
36th	2000–2000	André Harvey	Liberal
Chicoutimi—Le Fjord
37th	2000–2004	André Harvey	Liberal
38th	2004–2006	Robert Bouchard	Bloc Québécois
39th	2006–2008	Robert Bouchard	Bloc Québécois
40th	2008–2011	Robert Bouchard	Bloc Québécois
41st	2011–2015	Dany Morin	New Democratic
42nd	2015–2017	Denis Lemieux	Liberal
42nd	2018–2019	Richard Martel	Conservative
43rd	2019–2021	Richard Martel	Conservative
44th	2021–2025	Richard Martel	Conservative
46th	2025–2026	Richard Martel	Conservative
46th	2026–present	Daniel Gobeil	Liberal

The riding followed the typical path of most nationalist Quebec ridings, except for an independent being elected (1945–1957), and former MP André Harvey narrowly defeating incumbent Gilbert Fillion in 1997, one of only a few PC seats in Quebec that year.

== Election results ==
View source data.
Graph of election results in Chicoutmi—Le Fjord (minor parties that never got 2% of the vote or didn't run consistently are omitted)

Canadian federal by-election, August 31, 2026 Resignation of Richard Martel
Party	Candidate	Votes	%	±%
Liberal	Daniel Gobeil	16,333	51.55	+20.43
Bloc Québécois	Caroline Dubé	10,397	32.82	+1.63
Conservative	Régis Gaudreault	3,985	12.58	-21.56
New Democratic	Raphaël Émond	577	1.82	–0.13
Green	Nathe Perrone	218	0.69	-0.25
People's	François Sabourin	171	0.54	-0.13
Total valid votes		31,681		
Total rejected ballots		363		
Turnout		32,044	42.96	-25.58
Eligible voters		74,952		
Liberal gain from Conservative		Swing		+20.91
Source: Elections Canada

2025 Canadian federal election
Party	Candidate	Votes	%	±%	Expenditures
Conservative	Richard Martel	17,356	34.14	-6.24	$91,466.24
Bloc Québécois	Marc St-Hilaire	15,857	31.19	-2.88	$44,039.70
Liberal	Stéphane Proulx	15,820	31.12	+12.90	$6,306.74
New Democratic	Raphaël Émond	991	1.95	-2.75	$2,726.02
Green	Yves Laporte	476	0.94	-0.24	$15.96
People's	François Sabourin	339	0.67	-0.70	none listed
Total valid votes/expense limit		50,839	98.60	–	$125,644.80
Total rejected ballots		721	1.40	-0.56	
Turnout		51,560	68.54	+3.89	
Eligible voters		75,229			
Conservative notional hold		Swing		-1.68	
Source: Elections Canada

2021 federal election redistributed results
Party	Vote	%
Conservative	19,175	40.37
Bloc Québécois	16,181	34.07
Liberal	8,653	18.22
New Democratic	2,234	4.70
People's	649	1.37
Green	557	1.17
Rhinoceros	44	0.09
Total valid votes	47,493	98.05
Rejected ballots	947	1.95
Registered voters/ estimated turnout	74,924	64.65

2021 Canadian federal election
Party	Candidate	Votes	%	±%	Expenditures
Conservative	Richard Martel	17,228	41.01	+4.20	$49,214.19
Bloc Québécois	Julie Bouchard	14,027	33.39	-1.52	$13,745.50
Liberal	Jean Duplain	7,676	18.27	+1.17	$0.00
New Democratic	Ismaël Raymond	1,944	4.63	-1.88	$2,095.41
People's	Jimmy Voyer	649	1.55	+0.73	none listed
Green	Yves Laporte	482	1.15	-2.02	$0.00
Total valid votes/expense limit		42,006	98.14	–	$104,807.38
Total rejected ballots		797	1.86	-0.20	
Turnout		42,803	65.27	-2.88	
Registered voters		65,579			
Conservative hold		Swing		+2.86	
Source: Elections Canada

2019 Canadian federal election
Party	Candidate	Votes	%	±%	Expenditures
Conservative	Richard Martel	16,155	36.82	-15.94	$88,278.98
Bloc Québécois	Valérie Tremblay	15,321	34.91	+29.32	none listed
Liberal	Dajana Dautovic	7,504	17.10	-12.39	$9,048.24
New Democratic	Stéphane Girard	2,855	6.51	-2.14	$1,181.55
Green	Lynda Youde	1,388	3.16	+0.07	$2,988.37
People's	Jimmy Voyer	359	0.82	–	$1,360.01
Rhinoceros	Line Bélanger	299	0.68	–	$0.00
Total valid votes/expense limit		43,881	97.94		
Total rejected ballots		925	2.06	+0.73	
Turnout		44,806	68.15	+31.62	
Eligible voters		65,747			
Conservative hold		Swing		-22.63	
Source: Elections Canada

Canadian federal by-election, June 18, 2018 Resignation of Denis Lemieux
Party	Candidate	Votes	%	±%
Conservative	Richard Martel	12,600	52.76	+36.16
Liberal	Lina Boivin	7,044	29.50	-1.60
New Democratic	Éric Dubois	2,065	8.65	-21.07
Bloc Québécois	Catherine Bouchard-Tremblay	1,337	5.60	-14.92
Green	Lynda Youde	738	3.09	+1.02
Independent	John Turmel	98	0.41	
Total valid votes/expense limit		23,882	98.67	
Total rejected ballots		322	1.33	-0.34
Turnout		24,204	36.52	-30.15
Eligible voters		66,267		
Conservative gain from Liberal		Swing		+18.88
Source:Elections Canada: Official Voting Results

2015 Canadian federal election
Party	Candidate	Votes	%	±%	Expenditures
Liberal	Denis Lemieux	13,619	31.09	+25.34	$15,757.95
New Democratic	Dany Morin	13,019	29.72	-7.96	$61,908.19
Bloc Québécois	Élise Gauthier	8,990	20.52	-8.29	$34,879.59
Conservative	Caroline Ste-Marie	7,270	16.60	-8.97	$33,846.47
Green	Dany St-Gelais	907	2.07	+0.55	$64.43
Total valid votes/Expense limit		43,805	98.33		$201,130.77
Total rejected ballots		745	1.67	–	
Turnout		44,550	66.67	–	
Eligible voters		66,821			
Liberal gain from New Democratic		Swing		+16.65	
Source: Elections Canada

2011 federal election redistributed results
Party	Vote	%
New Democratic	16,238	37.68
Bloc Québécois	12,418	28.81
Conservative	11,017	25.56
Liberal	2,479	5.75
Green	655	1.52
Others	289	0.67

2011 Canadian federal election
Party	Candidate	Votes	%	±%	Expenditures
New Democratic	Dany Morin	19,430	38.13	+30.30	
Bloc Québécois	Robert Bouchard	14,675	28.80	-12.51	
Conservative	Carol Néron	12,881	25.28	-9.63	
Liberal	Marc Pettersen	2,852	5.60	-7.85	
Green	Charles-Olivier Bolduc-Tremblay	780	1.53	-0.97	
Rhinoceros	Marielle Couture	340	0.67	–	
Total valid votes/Expense limit		50,958	98.69		
Total rejected ballots		678	1.31	-0.24	
Turnout		51,636	65.06	+2.82	
Eligible voters		79,369	–		
New Democratic gain from Bloc Québécois		Swing		+21.40	

2008 Canadian federal election
Party	Candidate	Votes	%	±%	Expenditures
Bloc Québécois	Robert Bouchard	19,737	41.31	+2.82	$87,392
Conservative	Jean-Guy Maltais	16,680	34.91	+10.19	$73,050
Liberal	Marc Pettersen	6,425	13.45	-15.74	$11,593
New Democratic	Stéphane Girard	3,742	7.83	+2.69	$2,101
Green	Jean-François Veilleux	1,193	2.50	+0.04	
Total valid votes/Expense limit		47,777	98.44		$100,545
Total rejected ballots		756	1.56	+0.42	
Turnout		48,533	62.25	-2.47	
Eligible voters		77,959	–		
Bloc Québécois hold		Swing		-3.68	

2006 Canadian federal election
Party	Candidate	Votes	%	±%	Expenditures
Bloc Québécois	Robert Bouchard	19,226	38.49	-6.84	$72,889
Liberal	André Harvey	14,581	29.19	-14.24	$52,235
Conservative	Alcide Boudreault	12,350	24.72	+19.49	$7,792
New Democratic	Éric Dubois	2,571	5.15	+1.42	$4,812
Green	Jean-Martin Gauthier	1,226	2.45	+0.18	
Total valid votes/Expense limit		49,954	98.86		$94,498
Total rejected ballots		575	1.14	-0.82	
Turnout		50,529	64.72	+5.92	
Eligible voters		78,073	–		
Bloc Québécois hold		Swing		+3.70	

2004 Canadian federal election
Party	Candidate	Votes	%	±%	Expenditures
Bloc Québécois	Robert Bouchard	20,650	45.33	+5.96	$63,059
Liberal	André Harvey	19,787	43.43	-1.75	$69,076
Conservative	Alcide Boudreault	2,385	5.23	-0.42	$17,677
New Democratic	Éric Dubois	1,699	3.73	+1.94	$7,418
Green	Paul Tremblay	1,038	2.28	-	
Total valid votes/Expense limit		45,559	98.04		$93,636
Total rejected ballots		910	1.96		
Turnout		46,469	58.80		
Eligible voters		79,028	–		
Bloc Québécois notional gain from Liberal		Swing		+3.85	
Change is from redistributed results. Conservative vote is compared to the Canadian Alliance vote in the 2000 election.

2000 federal election redistributed results
Party	Vote	%
Liberal	22,004	45.18
Bloc Québécois	19,172	39.36
Independents	3,906	8.02
Canadian Alliance	2,617	5.37
New Democratic	870	1.79
Progressive Conservative	135	0.28

2000 Canadian federal election
Party	Candidate	Votes	%	±%
Liberal	André Harvey	20,105	48.24	+36.88
Bloc Québécois	Noel Tremblay	15,073	36.17	-6.77
Independent	Mauril Desbiens	3,797	9.11	
Alliance	Douglas Schroeder-Tabah	2,001	4.80	
New Democratic	Alain Ranger	698	1.67	-0.33
Total valid votes		41,674	96.87	
Total rejected ballots		1,347	3.13	+0.11
Turnout		43,021	64.15	-4.30
Eligible voters		67,058		
Liberal gain from Progressive Conservative		Swing		+40.28

1997 Canadian federal election
Party	Candidate	Votes	%	±%
Progressive Conservative	André Harvey	18,598	43.69	+19.63
Bloc Québécois	Gilbert Fillion	18,281	42.94	-21.01
Liberal	Eric Delisle	4,839	11.37	+0.56
New Democratic	Anne-Marie Buck	853	2.00	+0.82
Total valid votes		42,571	96.98	
Total rejected ballots		1,324	3.02	
Turnout		43,895	68.46	
Eligible voters		64,122		
Progressive Conservative notional gain from Bloc Québécois		Swing		+20.32

1993 federal election redistributed results
Party	Vote	%
Bloc Québécois	28,709	63.96
Progressive Conservative	10,800	24.06
Liberal	4,849	10.80
New Democratic	530	1.18

1993 Canadian federal election
Party	Candidate	Votes	%	±%
Bloc Québécois	Gilbert Fillion	29,511	63.90	
Progressive Conservative	André Harvey	11,126	24.09	-46.29
Liberal	Georges Frenette	5,000	10.83	-7.62
New Democratic	Christine Moore	548	1.19	-9.98
Total valid votes		46,185	97.52	
Total rejected ballots		1,175	2.48	+0.81
Turnout		47,360	72.84	-2.85
Eligible voters		65,021		
Bloc Québécois gain from Progressive Conservative		Swing		+55.10

1988 Canadian federal election
Party	Candidate	Votes	%	±%
Progressive Conservative	André Harvey	30,699	70.38	+9.57
Liberal	Laval Gauthier	8,047	18.45	-10.82
New Democratic	Mustapha Elayoubi	4,870	11.17	+5.14
Total valid votes		43,616	98.33	
Total rejected ballots		743	1.67	+0.83
Turnout		44,359	75.69	-0.44
Eligible voters		58,609		
Progressive Conservative hold		Swing		+10.20

1984 Canadian federal election
Party	Candidate	Votes	%	±%
Progressive Conservative	André Harvey	22,304	60.81	+42.63
Liberal	Marcel Dionne	10,736	29.27	-38.24
New Democratic	Denise Coté	2,211	6.03	-3.46
Rhinoceros	Réjean Fou Fournier	801	2.18	
Parti nationaliste	Marie-Claude Desloges	626	1.71	+0.49
Total valid votes		36,678	99.15	
Total rejected ballots		313	0.85	-0.86
Turnout		36,991	76.12	+8.68
Eligible voters		48,593		
Progressive Conservative gain from Liberal		Swing		+40.44

1980 Canadian federal election
Party	Candidate	Votes	%	±%
Liberal	Marcel Dionne	20,821	67.52	+18.05
Progressive Conservative	Rodrigue Begin	5,607	18.18	-5.34
New Democratic	Marc St-Hilaire	2,926	9.49	+5.21
Social Credit	Hilaire Vézina	1,110	3.60	-16.55
Union populaire	Carol Lavoie	375	1.22	
Total valid votes		30,839	98.29	
Total rejected ballots		535	1.71	+0.68
Turnout		31,374	67.44	-7.86
Eligible voters		46,521		
Liberal hold		Swing		+11.70

1979 Canadian federal election
Party	Candidate	Votes	%	±%
Liberal	Marcel Dionne	16,605	49.46	-1.40
Progressive Conservative	Jean-Marc Lavoie	7,897	23.52	-5.68
Social Credit	Magella Tremblay	6,763	20.14	+3.43
New Democratic	Marc St-Hilaire	1,435	4.27	+1.65
Rhinoceros	Eric Blackburn	872	2.60	
Total valid votes		33,572	98.98	
Total rejected ballots		347	1.02	-4.03
Turnout		33,919	75.30	+6.32
Eligible voters		45,045		
Liberal hold		Swing		+2.14

1974 Canadian federal election
Party	Candidate	Votes	%	±%
Liberal	Paul Langlois	17,096	50.9	+7.2
Progressive Conservative	Jean-Marc Lavoie	9,817	29.2	-6.2
Social Credit	Maurice Côté	5,618	16.7	-1.6
New Democratic	Colette Richard	882	2.6	0.0
Marxist–Leninist	Robert Laporte	202	0.6	
Total valid votes		33,615	100.0	

1972 Canadian federal election
Party	Candidate	Votes	%	±%
Liberal	Paul Langlois	15,655	43.6	-6.7
Progressive Conservative	Jean-Marc Lavoie	12,712	35.4	+0.3
Social Credit	Maurice Côté	6,572	18.3	+7.0
New Democratic	Serge Morin	935	2.6	-0.5
Total valid votes		35,874	100.0	

Note: Social Credit vote is compared to Ralliement créditiste vote in the 1968 election.

1968 Canadian federal election
Party	Candidate	Votes	%	±%
Liberal	Paul Langlois	14,054	50.4	+12.9
Progressive Conservative	Jean-Marc Lavoie	9,811	35.2	+18.0
Ralliement créditiste	Antonio Simard	3,151	11.3	-15.4
New Democratic	Jean-Baptiste Gauthier	879	3.2	-0.7
Total valid votes		27,895	100.0	

1965 Canadian federal election
Party	Candidate	Votes	%	±%
Liberal	Paul Langlois	11,092	37.4	+4.4
Ralliement créditiste	Majella Tremblay	7,894	26.6	-20.0
Progressive Conservative	Vincent Brassard	5,087	17.2	+5.4
Independent	Maurice Côté	4,419	14.9	
New Democratic	Denis Beaudoin	1,131	3.8	-4.8
Total valid votes		29,623	100.0	

Note: Ralliement créditiste vote is compared to Social Credit vote in the 1963 election.

1963 Canadian federal election
Party	Candidate	Votes	%	±%
Social Credit	Maurice Côté	14,581	46.6	-4.0
Liberal	Gérard Tremblay	10,334	33.1	+4.7
Progressive Conservative	Claude Bouchard	3,670	11.7	-6.0
New Democratic	Maurice Villeneuve	2,687	8.6	+5.3
Total valid votes		31,272	100.0	

1962 Canadian federal election
Party	Candidate	Votes	%	±%
Social Credit	Maurice Côté	16,566	50.6	
Liberal	Gérard Tremblay	9,310	28.4	-12.2
Progressive Conservative	Vincent Brassard	5,803	17.7	-32.9
New Democratic	Maurice Villeneuve	1,071	3.3	-5.5
Total valid votes		32,750	100.0	

1958 Canadian federal election
Party	Candidate	Votes	%	±%
Progressive Conservative	Vincent Brassard	15,407	50.6	
Liberal	Rosaire Gauthier	12,348	40.6	-11.8
Co-operative Commonwealth	Victor Gladu	2,666	8.8	
Total valid votes		30,421	100.0	

1957 Canadian federal election
Party	Candidate	Votes	%	±%
Liberal	Rosaire Gauthier	15,124	52.4	+18.0
Independent	Paul-Edmond Gagnon	13,733	47.6	-18.0
Total valid votes		28,857	100.0	

1953 Canadian federal election
Party	Candidate	Votes	%	±%
Independent	Paul-Edmond Gagnon	16,046	65.6	18.5
Liberal	Roland Angers	8,408	34.4	-10.5
Total valid votes		24,454	100.0	

1949 Canadian federal election
Party	Candidate	Votes	%	±%
Independent	Paul-Edmond Gagnon	10,252	47.1	+14.8
Liberal	Charles-Henri Desbiens	9,763	44.8	+20.8
Union des électeurs	Charles-David Jean	1,757	8.1	-0.1
Total valid votes		21,772	100.0	

1945 Canadian federal election
Party	Candidate	Votes	%	±%
Independent	Paul-Edmond Gagnon	10,796	32.3	
Bloc populaire	Rolland Angers	10,215	30.6	
Liberal	Joseph-Arthur Hamel	8,027	24.0	-14.8
Social Credit	David Maltais	2,713	8.1	
Independent	Jules Landry	1,282	3.8	
Co-operative Commonwealth	Antoine Brisson	371	1.1	
Total valid votes		33,404	100.0	

1940 Canadian federal election
Party	Candidate	Votes	%	±%
Liberal	Alfred Dubuc	8,693	38.8	-8.5
National Government	François-Albert Dumas	8,330	37.2	-0.5
Independent Liberal	Eudore Boivin	5,390	24.0	
Total valid votes		22,413	100.0	

Note: "National Government" vote is compared to Conservative vote in 1935 election.

1935 Canadian federal election
Party	Candidate	Votes	%	±%
Liberal	Alfred Dubuc	9,685	47.3	-4.9
Conservative	Joseph-Adam Lavergne	7,719	37.7	-10.1
Independent Liberal	Georges-Aimé Gagnon	2,373	11.6	
Independent	Donat Demers	690	3.4	
Total valid votes		20,467	100.0	

1930 Canadian federal election
Party	Candidate	Votes	%	±%
Liberal	Alfred Dubuc	10,641	52.2	-28.0
Conservative	Joseph-Adam Lavergne	9,744	47.8	+28.0
Total valid votes		20,385	100.0	

Note: Alfred Dubuc's popular vote as a Liberal candidate is compared to his popular vote as an independent Liberal candidate in the 1926 general election.

1926 Canadian federal election
Party	Candidate	Votes	%	±%
Independent Liberal	Alfred Dubuc	8,658	80.2	+26.0
Conservative	Joseph Eugène Bergeron	2,142	19.8	+11.4
Total valid votes		10,800	100.0	

1925 Canadian federal election
Party	Candidate	Votes	%
Independent Liberal	Alfred Dubuc	7,198	54.1
Liberal	Louis-Joseph Levesque	4,981	37.5
Conservative	Jean-Charles Gagne	1,120	8.4
Total valid votes		13,299	100.0

== See also ==
- List of Canadian electoral districts
- Historical federal electoral districts of Canada
