= Paul Langlois (politician) =

Canadian politician (1926–2012)

- Official 1974 portrait

Member of Parliament for Chicoutimi
- In office November 1965 – March 1979
- Preceded by: Maurice Côté
- Succeeded by: Marcel Dionne

Personal details
- Born: 4 December 1926 Trois-Rivières, Quebec
- Died: 17 July 2012 (aged 85) Ottawa, Ontario
- Party: Liberal
- Spouse(s): Yolande Lamarche m. 17 July 1953
- Profession: businessman, industrialist

Paul Langlois (French pronunciation: [pɔl lɑ̃ɡlwa]; 4 December 1926 – 17 July 2012) was a Liberal party member of the House of Commons of Canada. He was a businessman and industrialist by career.

Langlois studied at the Mont-St-Louis Institute.

He was first elected at the Chicoutimi riding in the 1965 general election and was re-elected there in 1968, 1972 and 1974. Langlois was Parliamentary Secretary to the Minister of Public Works in August 1968 and October 1969, then was Parliamentary Secretary to the Minister of Consumer and Corporate Affairs until September 1970. After completing his term in the 30th Canadian Parliament in 1979, Langlois left federal politics and did not seek further re-election.
