= Dany Morin =

Canadian politician

Member of Parliament for Chicoutimi—Le Fjord
- In office 2011–2015
- Preceded by: Robert Bouchard
- Succeeded by: Denis Lemieux

Personal details
- Born: 19 December 1985 (age 40) Chicoutimi, Quebec, Canada
- Party: New Democratic Party
- Profession: Chiropractor

Dany Morin (born 19 December 1985) is a Canadian businessman and former politician, who served in the House of Commons of Canada from 2011 to 2015. He represented the electoral district of Chicoutimi—Le Fjord as a member of the New Democratic Party.

A chiropractor, he was one of five openly gay candidates elected to Parliament in the 2011 election. He served as the NDP associate critic for lesbian, gay, bisexual, transgender, and transsexual issues, alongside lead critic Randall Garrison.

Morin was defeated in the 2015 election by Liberal Denis Lemieux. Following his electoral defeat, he launched Monsieur Fulgence, an e-commerce project to promote local artisans and craftspeople from the Saguenay–Lac-Saint-Jean region.
