= Denis Lemieux =

Canadian politician

Member of Parliament for Chicoutimi—Le Fjord
- In office October 19, 2015 – December 1, 2017
- Preceded by: Dany Morin
- Succeeded by: Richard Martel (2018)

Personal details
- Born: 1964 (age 61–62) Chicoutimi, Quebec
- Party: Liberal
- Profession: Entrepreneur

Denis Lemieux (born 1964) is a Canadian politician, who was elected to represent the riding of Chicoutimi—Le Fjord in the House of Commons of Canada in the 2015 Canadian federal election. Citing family reasons, he announced his resignation on November 6, 2017. It took effect on December 1, 2017.

Lemieux holds a bachelor's degree in general engineering and has held a variety of positions in industrial companies in the region.

At the time of the 2025 Canadian federal election, he lived in Saint-Nazaire-du-Lac-Saint-Jean.

== Electoral record ==
2025 Canadian federal election: Lac-Saint-Jean
Party	Candidate	Votes	%	±%	Expenditures
Bloc Québécois	Alexis Brunelle-Duceppe	22,069	46.21	−4.69	
Liberal	Denis Lemieux	12,536	26.25	+7.28	
Conservative	Dave Blackburn	11,792	24.69	−0.58	
New Democratic	Hugues Boily-Maltais	819	1.71	−1.56	
People's	Lorie Bouchard	540	1.13	N/A	
Total valid votes/expense limit		47,756	98.58		
Total rejected ballots		689	1.42		
Turnout		48,445	64.14		
Eligible voters		75,528			
Bloc Québécois notional hold		Swing		−5.99	
Source: Elections Canada
Note: number of eligible voters does not include voting day registrations.

2015 Canadian federal election
Party	Candidate	Votes	%	±%	Expenditures
Liberal	Denis Lemieux	13,619	31.09	+25.34	–
New Democratic	Dany Morin	13,019	29.72	-7.96	–
Bloc Québécois	Élise Gauthier	8,990	20.52	-8.29	–
Conservative	Caroline Ste-Marie	7,270	16.60	-8.97	–
Green	Dany St-Gelais	907	2.07	+0.55	–
Total valid votes/Expense limit		43,805	100.00		$200,694.12
Total rejected ballots		745	1.67	–	
Turnout		44,550	54.66	–	
Eligible voters		81,501			
Liberal gain from New Democratic		Swing		+16.65	
Source: Elections Canada
