= Maurice Côté =

Canadian politician

Member of Parliament for Chicoutimi
- In office June 1962 – September 1965

Personal details
- Born: 8 October 1917 Chicoutimi-Nord, Quebec
- Died: 28 November 1986 Chicoutimi, Quebec
- Party: Social Credit; Independent; Social Credit
- Spouse: Odile Lapointe
- Profession: Broker, investment counsellor, stockbroker

Maurice Côté (8 October 1917 – 28 November 1986) was a Social Credit party member of the House of Commons of Canada. He was a broker, investment counsellor and stockbroker by career.

He was first elected at the Chicoutimi riding in the 1962 general election then re-elected there in 1963. For the 1965 election, Côté became an independent candidate and was defeated by Paul Langlois of the Liberal party. In that election, Majella Tremblay was the Ralliement créditiste candidate, the banner which the Social Credit party in Quebec became known during that time. Côté also made unsuccessful attempts to win back Chicoutimi in 1972 and 1974.
