= André Harvey (MP) =

Canadian consultant, politician and teacher

André Harvey, PC (born September 16, 1941) is a Canadian consultant, politician and former teacher in Quebec, Canada.

== Career ==
Harvey was first elected to the House of Commons of Canada in the 1984 general election that brought Brian Mulroney to power. The Progressive Conservative Member of Parliament (MP) for Chicoutimi, Quebec remained a backbencher until January 1993 when he became parliamentary secretary to Prime Minister Mulroney.

When Kim Campbell succeeded Mulroney as PC leader and prime minister, Harvey became parliamentary secretary to the Minister of Indian Affairs and Northern Development. Harvey and the Campbell government were defeated in the 1993 election.

He returned to parliament as a PC MP in the 1997 general election by retaking Chicoutimi from the Bloc Québécois. He was appointed whip of the small Progressive Conservative caucus by the party leader Jean Charest. Charest moved to provincial politics in 1998, and was replaced by Joe Clark as party leader. Tory support in Quebec declined in the absence of a French-Canadian leader, and the party underwent a series of crises. In April 2000, Harvey became one of a series of Tory MPs to leave the party. He sat as an independent MP until the fall when he and two other former Tory MPs, David Price and Diane St-Jacques, crossed the floor to join the Liberals.

Harvey was re-elected as the Liberal MP for Chicoutimi—Le Fjord in the 2000 general election. In 2001, Prime Minister Jean Chrétien appointed Harvey Parliamentary Secretary to the Minister of Transport, and then Parliamentary Secretary to the Minister for International Cooperation in 2003.

When Paul Martin succeeded Chrétien as prime minister in late 2003, he moved Harvey to the position of Parliamentary Secretary to the Minister of Natural Resources with special emphasis on Development of Value-Added Industries and named him to the Queen's Privy Council for Canada. Harvey stood for re-election in the 2004 general election, but was defeated by Robert Bouchard of the Bloc Québécois. He stood again for the House of Commons in the 2006, but was once again defeated.

In the leadership contest called to replace Paul Martin as leader of the Liberal Party, he supported Bob Rae.

He was also a candidate for the Quebec Liberal Party in the 2007 Quebec provincial election for the provincial riding of Chicoutimi, but was defeated.
