= O'Connor–Parkview =

- Neighbourhood
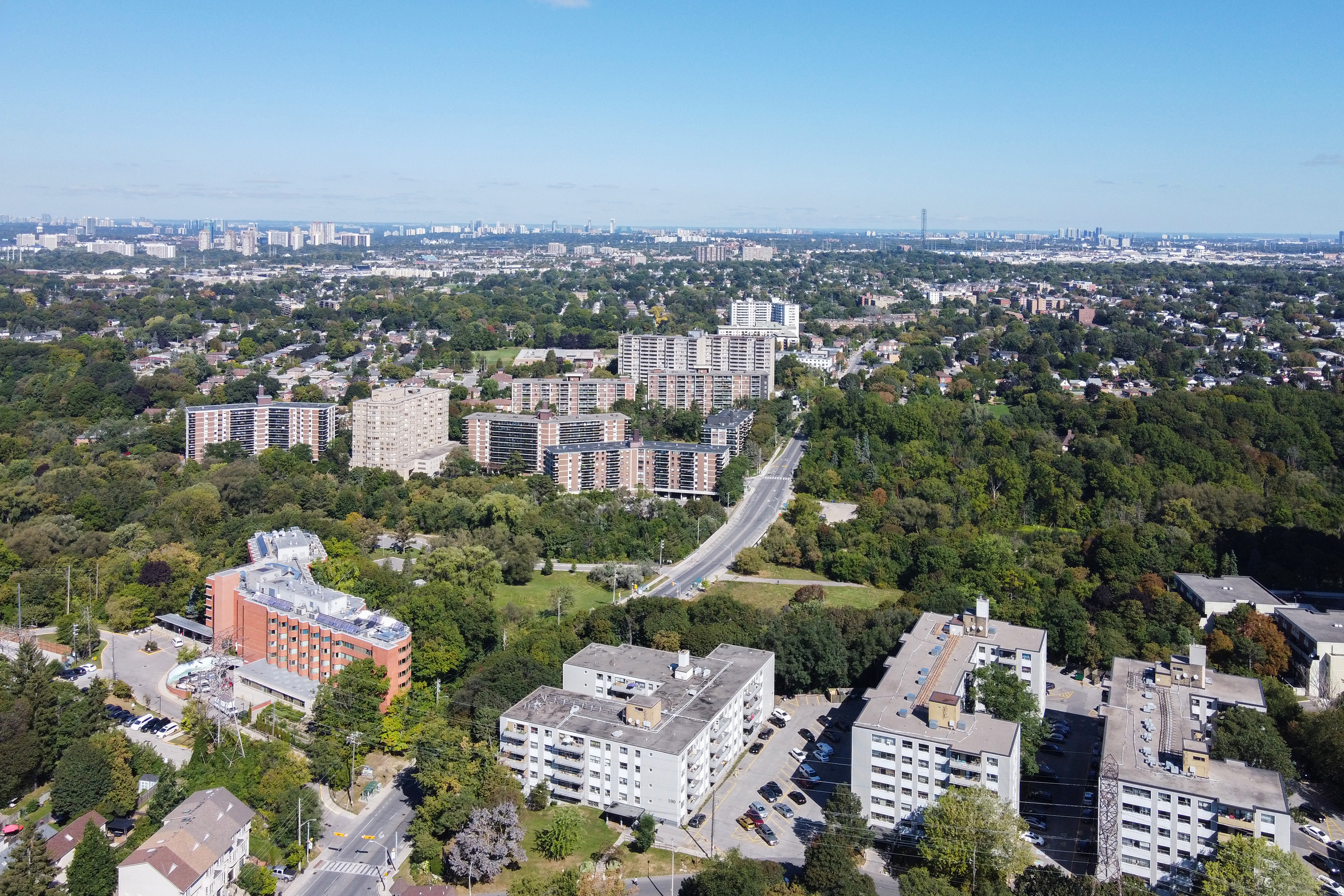
- Aerial view of Woodbine Gardens from Taylor-Massey

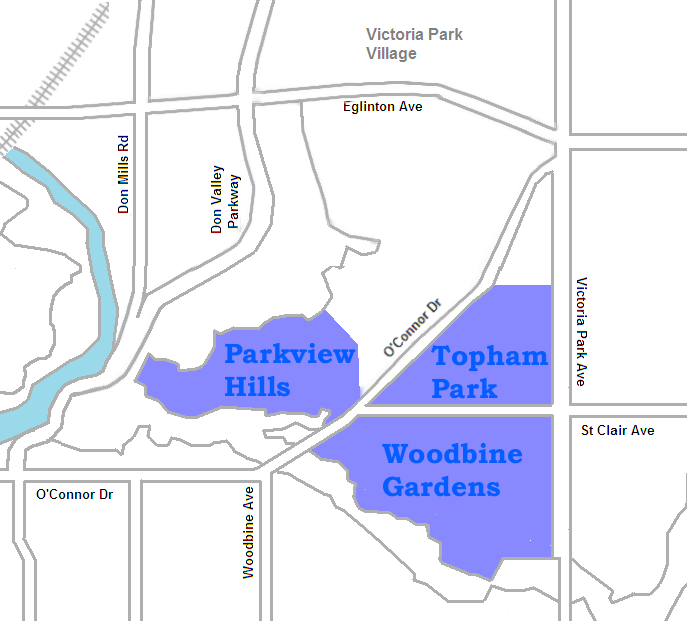
- The three neighbourhoods of the area
- Coordinates: 43°42′20″N 79°18′46″W
- Country: Canada
- Province: Ontario
- City: Toronto
- Community: Toronto & East York
- Changed Municipality: 1924 East York from York; 1998 Toronto from East York

Government
  - MP: Nathaniel Erskine-Smith (Beaches-East York)
  - MPP: Rima Berns-McGown (Beaches-East York)
  - Councillor: Brad Bradford (Ward 31 Beaches-East York)

O'Connor–Parkview is a neighbourhood in the East York area of Toronto, Ontario, Canada. While the name is taken from the definition used by the city of Toronto, local residents are more familiar with the niche areas that define the larger neighbourhood. It is a very diverse neighbourhood that includes English-speakers and Greeks in the west, to the Tamil speakers in the east and Bengali and Urdu speakers in the south. It includes low-income highrises, to huge property lots. The smaller areas included inside the neighbourhood are Topham Park, Woodbine Gardens and Parkview Hills.

Located southeast of the Don Valley, the neighbourhood is bordered on the South by Taylor-Massey Creek (which flows west into the Don), to the east by Victoria Park Avenue and to the north by Holland Avenue.

== Neighborhood divisions ==
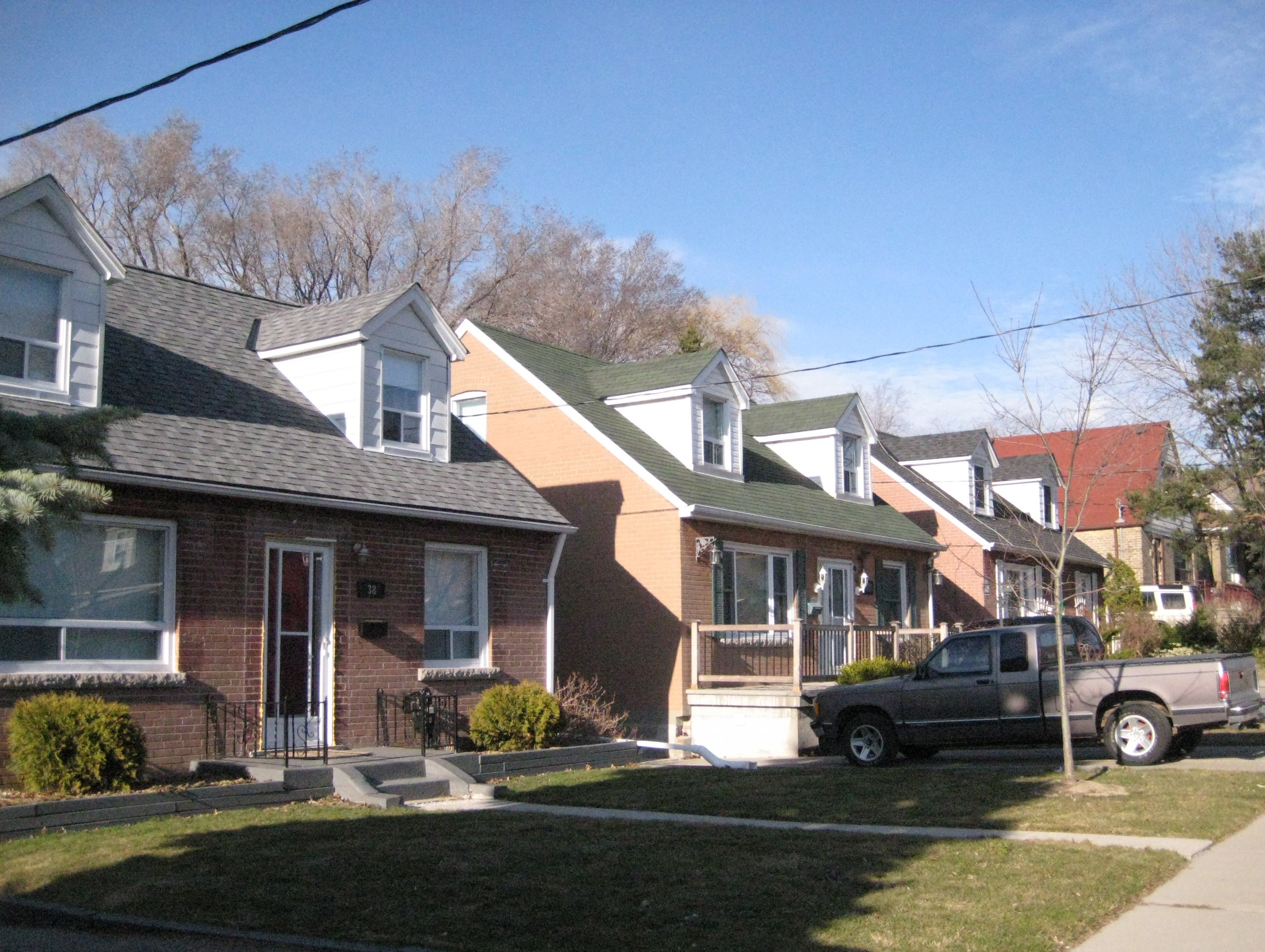
Houses in Topham Park. The area is located in the northeast portion of the neighbourhood.

Topham Park represents the upper East side of the neighborhood. It was developed by the CMHC between 1944 and 1946.

Woodbine Gardens, located south of Topham Park (they border on St.Clair) is bordered to the south by Taylor-Massey Creek (Don). The houses range from bungalows, two-story houses all the way to high-rise affordable housing units. The high rise units which oversee the former golf course give onlookers a view at the relatively large properties in the area.

Parkview Hills, is an affluent neighborhood in the former borough of East York. It is located North East of Downtown Toronto Surrounded by lush ravines, and parkland. It was surveyed as part of the third concession and is the end of St. Clair Avenue into the Don Valley. While significantly north of the Danforth, boasts a large Greek and English styled community. Parkview Hills, like most of O'Connor Parkview, has a large mix of ethnicity, though higher income levels and housing types. The property values in this niche area far surpass (on average) those in the rest of East York. Property sizes are quite large which has led to major redevelopment, replacing original bungalows into estate styled homes. This area is considered the "Rosedale" of the former borough of East York.

== Schools ==
- Gordon A. Brown Middle School - A middle school located at 2800 St. Clair Avenue East. It was established in 1949. Kiefer Sutherland is one of the alumni.
- George Webster Elementary School - An elementary school located at 2 Cedarcrest Boulevard. The school was established in 1954.
- Selwyn Public School - An elementary public school located at 1 Selwyn Avenue. The school was established in January 1957.
- Presteign Heights Elementary School- An elementary public school located at 2570 St.Clair Ave E. The school was established in 1951.
- Victoria Park Elementary School- An elementary public school located at 145 Tiago Ave. This historic school was established in 1861, six years before Confederation and was the school of the first Canadian born Governor General, Vincent Massey.
