= Sporsho Braille Prokashona =

Bengali braille book publisher

Sporsho Foundation (Bengali: স্পর্শ ব্রেইল প্রকাশনা, lit. 'Touch Braille Publishing') is a Bangladeshi specialty publisher of braille books. It distributes its books free of charge to the visually impaired.

The company was founded in 2008 by children's author Nazia Jabeen, who was inspired by a close relative's vision loss in a road traffic accident. The first book published by Sporsho, in 2009, was Jabeen's own Chharar Tale Monta Dole. Initially unable to secure the services of any of the few braille presses in Bangladesh, the first print run was 26 copies hand-typed on a braille typewriter. They were distributed to schools in twos and threes.

The publisher had a booth at the Ekushey Book Fair, the pre-eminent book event in Bangladesh, for the first time in 2011, and has become a regular fixture there. Visually impaired visitors are allowed to read at the stall all day, and in exchange for registration are later given free books. Books are also donated to schools and libraries.

As of 2018, Sporsho had published 61 titles in braille. Their output has included popular fiction by Humayun Ahmed, Muhammed Zafar Iqbal, and Imdadul Haq Milan; children's literature by Lutfor Rahman Riton; poetry by Syed Shamsul Haque; and one title per year on the history of the Bangladesh Liberation War by such authors as Mafidul Haque and Nilima Ibrahim. Sporsho published Margaret Davidson's 1971 biography Louis Braille in 2019, the first English-language braille book, other than textbooks, published in Bangladesh.

Jabeen received the "Inspiring Women Spirit" award in 2019 from Women in Leadership for her contributions benefiting the visually challenged.
