= Maria Minna =

Canadian politician

The Honourable Maria Minna PC
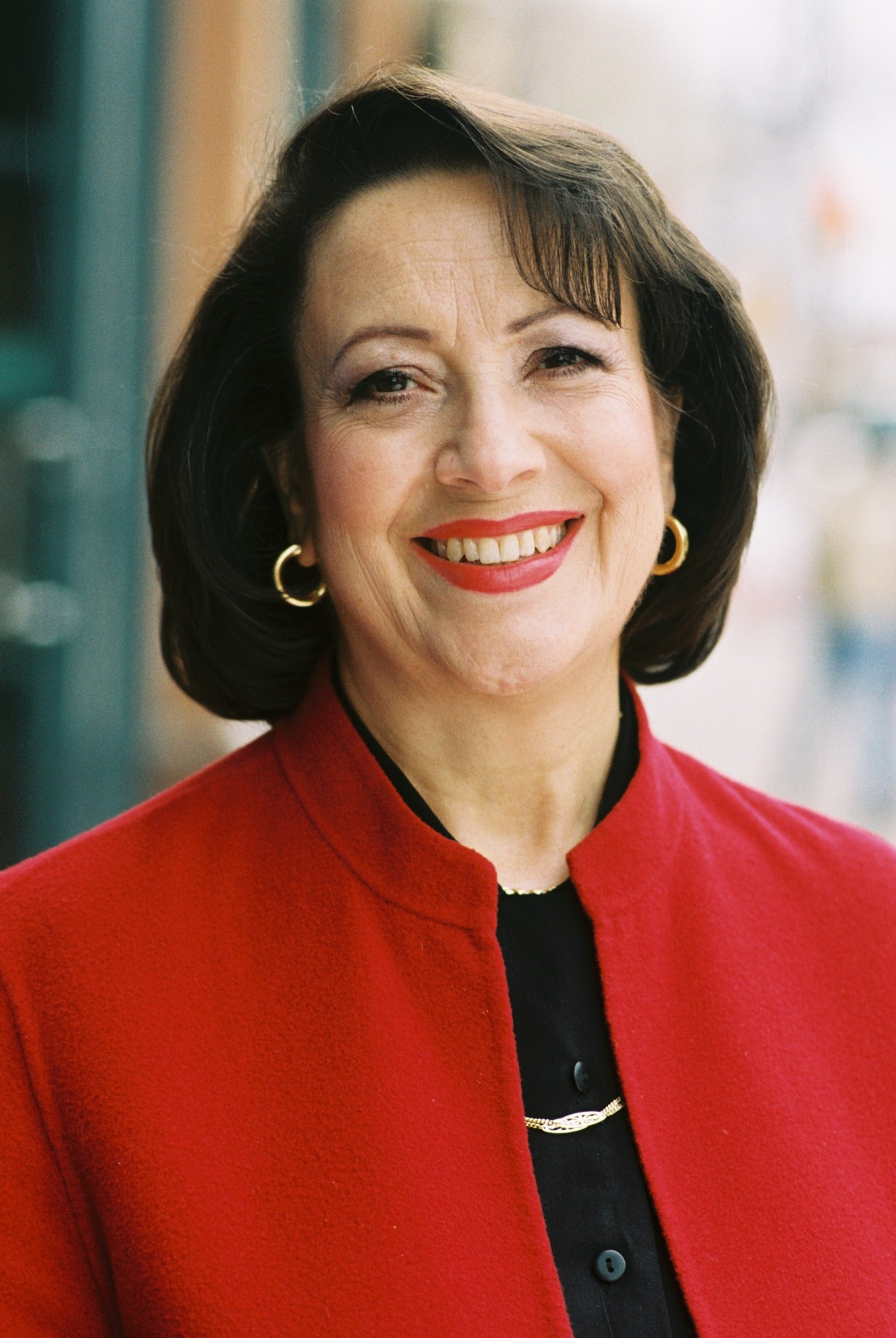

Member of Parliament for Beaches—East York
- In office 1997–2011
- Preceded by: riding renamed from Beaches—Woodbine
- Succeeded by: Matthew Kellway

Member of Parliament for Beaches—Woodbine
- In office 1993–1997
- Preceded by: Neil Young
- Succeeded by: riding renamed to Beaches—East York

Personal details
- Born: March 14, 1948 (age 78) Pofi, Italy
- Party: Liberal
- Spouse: Robert MacBain
- Profession: Businesswoman, public policy consultant

Maria Minna PC (born March 14, 1948) is a former Canadian politician who represented the Toronto riding of Beaches—East York in the House of Commons as a member of the Liberal Party from 1993 to 2011.

== Background ==
Minna was born in Pofi, Italy, and moved to Canada with her family at the age of 9. They settled in Toronto, Ontario, in the Christie Pits area. Her father worked in the construction industry and her mother laboured as a factory worker. She is the third eldest of five children, having three sisters and a brother. She attended a vocational high school earning a diploma and started working as a secretary. At age 24 she attended the University of Toronto where she graduated with an Honours B.A. in Sociology. At age 34, she married Robert MacBain, a public relations consultant.

From 1981 to 1992, she served as the volunteer president of COSTI-IIAS (formerly Centro Organizzativo Scuole Tecniche Italiane and the IIAS Italian Immigrant Aid Society), Canada's largest immigrant services organization. She also served as president of the National Congress of Italian-Canadians.

Due in part to her high profile, Minna was appointed to serve on two task forces with the Workers Compensation Board. In 1986 she co-chaired the Task Force on Vocational Rehabilitation and in 1991 she chaired a Task Force on Service Delivery. Both led to significant improvements in the operation of the WCB.

== Politics ==
Minna sought the Liberal nomination for the riding of York West in 1984. She lost to Sergio Marchi. She also tried to get nominated in the riding of York North in 1988 but lost to Maurizio Bevilacqua. The York North nomination fight turned ugly amidst claims of delegate stacking and improper procedures. Minna later appealed the nomination but withdrew the complaint claiming that the appeal process was tainted.

=== In government ===
She was elected to parliament in the 1993 election in which the Liberal party won all but one of the 99 Ontario seats. Although the former Liberal candidate ran against her as an independent, she defeated New Democratic Party (NDP) incumbent Neil Young by a margin of two-to-one, thus becoming the first Liberal in history to represent the Beaches area south of the Danforth. By 2008 she had been re-elected five times, easily defeating high-profile candidates such as Peter Tabuns (2004 election, by 7,738 votes) and Marilyn Churley (2006 election, by 2,778 votes; 2008 election, by 4,092 votes).

On August 3, 1999, Minna was appointed to Cabinet as the Minister of International Cooperation. She held the post until the beginning of 2002. On December 11, 2001, Minna was accused of improperly voting in a municipal by-election. She voted for friend and colleague Gail Nyberg who was running to replace Michael Prue who had been elected to the Provincial government in a September by-election. On advice from municipal officials, Minna cast a ballot even though she didn't live within the ward which occupies the northern half of her riding. According to municipal election rules, anyone who owns or rents a business is allowed to vote. Minna's constituency office was in the ward so that allowed her to cast a ballot. Soon after, Minna was dropped from Cabinet during a ministerial shuffle.

Minna was bitter about the demotion and complained to the Liberal Party's women's caucus that she was told to keep quiet about the issue. She claimed she was "hung out to dry by ambitious individuals...." Later she conceded that the PMO's office had told her that it would be better to wait for the results of the ethics investigation. Initially the ethics counsellor terminated the allegations probe since she was dropped from Cabinet but Minna insisted that it be reopened. She said, "It's my personal credibility that's at stake. It's not the cabinet post." Fellow Liberal MP Sheila Copps who sympathized with Minna's situation was quoted as saying, "The one thing you have in politics is your reputation." The probe was reopened and she was subsequently cleared of any wrongdoing.

During her time in government, Minna has held several leadership roles that have focused on immigration and international relations. In 1994 she was appointed Vice-Chair of the Standing Committee on Human Resources Development and served as Parliamentary Secretary to the Minister of Citizenship and Immigration from 1996 to 1998. In October 2004, Minna was appointed special adviser to the Minister of Foreign Affairs on issues of women, peace and security. In March 2005, Minna led a five-person Parliamentary delegation to assist with the peace process in Sri Lanka.

=== In opposition ===
From 2006 to January 2009, Minna was the Official Opposition Critic for the Status of Women. Minna was the Official Opposition Critic for Labour. On May 2, 2011, during the 41st federal election, Minna lost her seat to NDP candidate Matthew Kellway.

== Awards ==
Minna has received several awards recognizing her involvement with the immigrant community. These include the Indo-Canada Chamber of Commerce President's Award (2001), the Permio Italia nel Mondo award for individuals of Italian origin (2001), Results Canada's Outstanding Leadership Award (2002), and the Canada-Sri Lanka Business Council's President's Award (2006).

== Electoral record ==
2011 Canadian federal election: Beaches—East York
Party	Candidate	Votes	%	±%	Expenditures
New Democratic	Matthew Kellway	20,265	41.64	+9.51	$ 68,735.05
Liberal	Maria Minna	14,967	30.75	-10.22	$ 83,269.97
Conservative	Bill Burrows	11,067	22.74	+5.66	$ 32,786.98
Green	Aaron Cameron	2,240	4.60	-4.88	$ 12,901.50
Marxist–Leninist	Roger Carter	130	0.27	-0.07	
Total valid votes/expense limit		48,669	99.61	–	
Total rejected ballots		193	0.39	+0.02	
Turnout		48,862	66.66	+3.73	
Eligible voters		73,302	–	–	
New Democratic gain from Liberal		Swing		+9.86	

2008 Canadian federal election: Beaches—East York
Party	Candidate	Votes	%	±%	Expenditures
Liberal	Maria Minna	18,967	40.97	+0.58	$76,404
New Democratic	Marilyn Churley	14,875	32.13	-2.83	$75,350
Conservative	Caroline Alleslev	7,907	17.08	-0.96	$21,853
Green	Zoran Markovski	4,389	9.48	+3.41	$22,434
Marxist–Leninist	Roger Carter	155	0.33	+0.16	
Total valid votes/expense limit		46,293	99.63		$82,179
Total rejected ballots		172	0.37	+0.04	
Turnout		46,465	62.93	-7.58	
Eligible voters		73,832			
Liberal hold		Swing		+1.71	

2006 Canadian federal election: Beaches—East York
Party	Candidate	Votes	%	±%	Expenditures
Liberal	Maria Minna	20,678	40.39	-7.54	$73,454.03
New Democratic	Marilyn Churley	17,900	34.96	+2.67	$74,996.37
Conservative	Peter Conroy	9,238	18.04	+3.98	$74,667.09
Green	Jim Harris	3,106	6.07	+1.53	$9,644.25
Progressive Canadian	Jim Love	183	0.36		$244.26
Marxist–Leninist	Roger Carter	91	0.18	+0.08	
Total valid votes		51,196	99.67		
Total rejected ballots		168	0.33	-0.11	
Turnout		51,364	70.51	+6.49	
Eligible voters		72,844			
Liberal hold		Swing		-5.10	
Sources: Official Results, Elections Canada and Financial Returns, Elections Canada.

2004 Canadian federal election: Beaches—East York
Party	Candidate	Votes	%	±%
Liberal	Maria Minna	22,494	47.93	−5.29
New Democratic	Peter Tabuns	15,156	32.29	+11.77
Conservative	Nick Nikopoulos	6,603	14.07	−8.53
Green	Peter Davison	2,127	4.53	
Marijuana	Daniel Dufresne	365	0.78	
Independent	Edward Slota	80	0.17	
Communist	Miguel Figueroa	62	0.13	
Marxist–Leninist	Roger Carter	46	0.10	
Total valid votes		46,933	99.57	
Total rejected ballots		204	0.43	
Turnout		47,137	64.02	
Eligible voters		73,623		
Liberal hold		Swing		-8.53
Change is computed from the 2000 redistributed results. Conservative vote is compared to the total of the Canadian Alliance vote and Progressive Conservative vote in 2000 election.

2000 Canadian federal election: Beaches—East York
Party	Candidate	Votes	%	±%	Expenditures
Liberal	Maria Minna	22,515	52.74	+4.81	$61,974
New Democratic	Mel Watkins	8,936	20.93	−2.61	$54,232
Progressive Conservative	Wayne Clutterbuck	5,766	13.51	+1.20	$13,989
Alliance	Abu Alam	3,838	8.99	−5.35	$9,047
Marijuana	Bruce Watson	682	1.60		none listed
Green	James Mendel	599	1.40	+0.11	$102
Canadian Action	Randall Whitcomb	128	0.30		none listed
Natural Law	Donalda Fredeen	88	0.21	-0.37	none listed
Communist	Ann Nicholson	82	0.19		$202
Marxist–Leninist	Steve Rutchinski	53	0.12		$8
Total valid votes		42,687	99.58		
Total rejected ballots		179	0.42	-0.23	
Turnout		42,866	56.94	-10.39	
Electors on the lists		75,284			
Liberal hold		Swing		+3.71	
Note: Canadian Alliance vote is compared to the Reform vote in 1997 election. Sources: Official Results, Elections Canada and Financial Returns, Elections Canada.

1997 Canadian federal election: Beaches—East York
Party	Candidate	Votes	%	±%
Liberal	Maria Minna	21,844	47.93	+5.79
New Democratic	Mel Watkins	10,730	23.55	+7.34
Reform	Gary Miller	6,534	14.34	-2.12
Progressive Conservative	Jack Simpson	5,611	12.31	+0.13
Green	John Scheer	589	1.20	
Natural Law	Donalda Fredeen	264	0.58	
Total valid votes		45,572	99.35	
Total rejected ballots		296	0.65	
Turnout		45,868	67.33	
Eligible voters		68,127		
Liberal notional hold		Swing		-0.77

1993 Canadian federal election: Beaches—Woodbine
Party	Candidate	Votes	%	±%
Liberal	Maria Minna	17,639	40.73	+7.48
New Democratic	Neil Young	8,037	18.56	-16.61
Reform	Hugh Prendergast	6,844	15.80	+15.02
Independent	Terry Kelly	4,549	10.50	
Progressive Conservative	Denise Cole	4,316	9.97	-19.28
National	John-Frederick Cameron	1,139	2.63	
Green	Leane Haze	335	0.77	+0.07
Natural Law	Donalda Fredeen	265	0.61	
Marxist–Leninist	Pierre Chénier	94	0.22	
Independent	Keith Meadowcroft	66	0.15	
Abolitionist	Zahid Tirmizi	22	0.05	
Total valid votes		43,306	98.92	
Total rejected ballots		474	1.08	+0.50
Turnout		43,780	66.07	-8.80
Eligible voters		66,267		
Liberal gain from New Democratic		Swing		+12.05
