= Mizan Rahman =

Bangladeshi Canadian mathematician and writer (1932–2015)

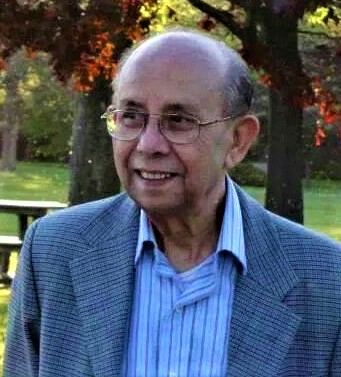
- Born: September 16, 1932; Dacca, East Bengal, British India
- Died: January 5, 2015 (aged 82); Ottawa, Ontario, Canada
- Education: University of Dhaka (BSc, MSc), University of Cambridge (BA), University of New Brunswick (PhD)
- Known for: coauthor of the book Basic Hypergeometric Series
- Scientific career
- Fields: Mathematics
- Workplaces: Carleton University

Mizan Rahman (September 16, 1932 – January 5, 2015) was a Bangladeshi Canadian mathematician and writer. He specialized in fields of mathematics such as hypergeometric series and orthogonal polynomials. He also had interests encompassing literature, philosophy, scientific skepticism, freethinking and rationalism. He co-authored Basic Hypergeometric Series with George Gasper. This book is widely considered as the standard work of choice for that subject of study. He also published ten Bengali books.

== Education and career ==
Rahman was born and grew up in East Bengal, British India (nowadays Bangladesh). He studied at the University of Dhaka, where he obtained his BSc degree in mathematics and physics in 1953, and his M.Sc. in applied mathematics in 1954. He received a B.A. in mathematics from the University of Cambridge in 1958, and an M.A. in mathematics from the same university in 1963. He was a senior lecturer at the University of Dhaka from 1958 until 1962. Rahman went to the University of New Brunswick of Canada in 1962 and received his Ph.D. in 1965 with a thesis on the kinetic theory of plasma using singular integral equation techniques. After his PhD, he became an assistant professor, later a full professor, at Carleton University, where he spent the rest of his career, after his retirement as a distinguished professor emeritus. He unexpectedly died in Ottawa on January 5, 2015, at the age of 82.

== Writing and other activities ==
Apart from his teaching and academic activities, Rahman wrote on various issues, particularly on those related to Bangladesh. He contributed to Internet blogs and various internet e-magazines, mainly in the Bengali language, covering his interests. He was a prolific writer and a regular contributor to Porshi, a Bengali monthly publication based in Silicon Valley, California.

He was also the member of the advisory board of the Mukto-Mona, an Internet congregation of freethinkers, rationalists, skeptics, atheists and humanists of mainly Bengali and South Asian descent.

== Honors and awards ==
- Best Teaching Award (1986)
- Life-time membership in the Bharat Ganita Parishad (Indian Mathematical Society)
- Fellow of the Bangladesh Academy of Sciences (2002)
- Award of Excellence from Bangladesh Publications (Ottawa) (1996)

== Books ==
English

- Basic Hypergeometric Series (co-author)
- Special Functions, q-Series and Related Topics (co-editor)
- The Little Garden in the Corner (prose)

Bengali

- তীর্থ আমার গ্রাম (Tirtha is my village) (1994)
- লাল নদী (The Red River) (2001)
- অ্যালবাম (Album) (2002)
- প্রসঙ্গ নারী (Context - Women) (2002)
- অনন্যা আমার দেশ (Ananya is my country) (2004)
- আনন্দ নিকেতন (Ananda Niketan) (2006)
- দুর্যোগের পূর্বাভাস (Premonition) (2007)
- শুধু মাটি নয় (Not just soil) (2009)
- ভাবনার আত্মকথন (Autobiography of thought) (2010)
- শূন্য (Zero) (2012)
- শূন্য থেকে মহাবিশ্ব With Avijit Roy(The universe from zero)(2015)
