= Bangladeshi Canadians =

Canadians of Bangladeshi descent

Bangladeshi Canadians _{Canadiens Bangladais}
কানাডীয় বাংলাদেশী
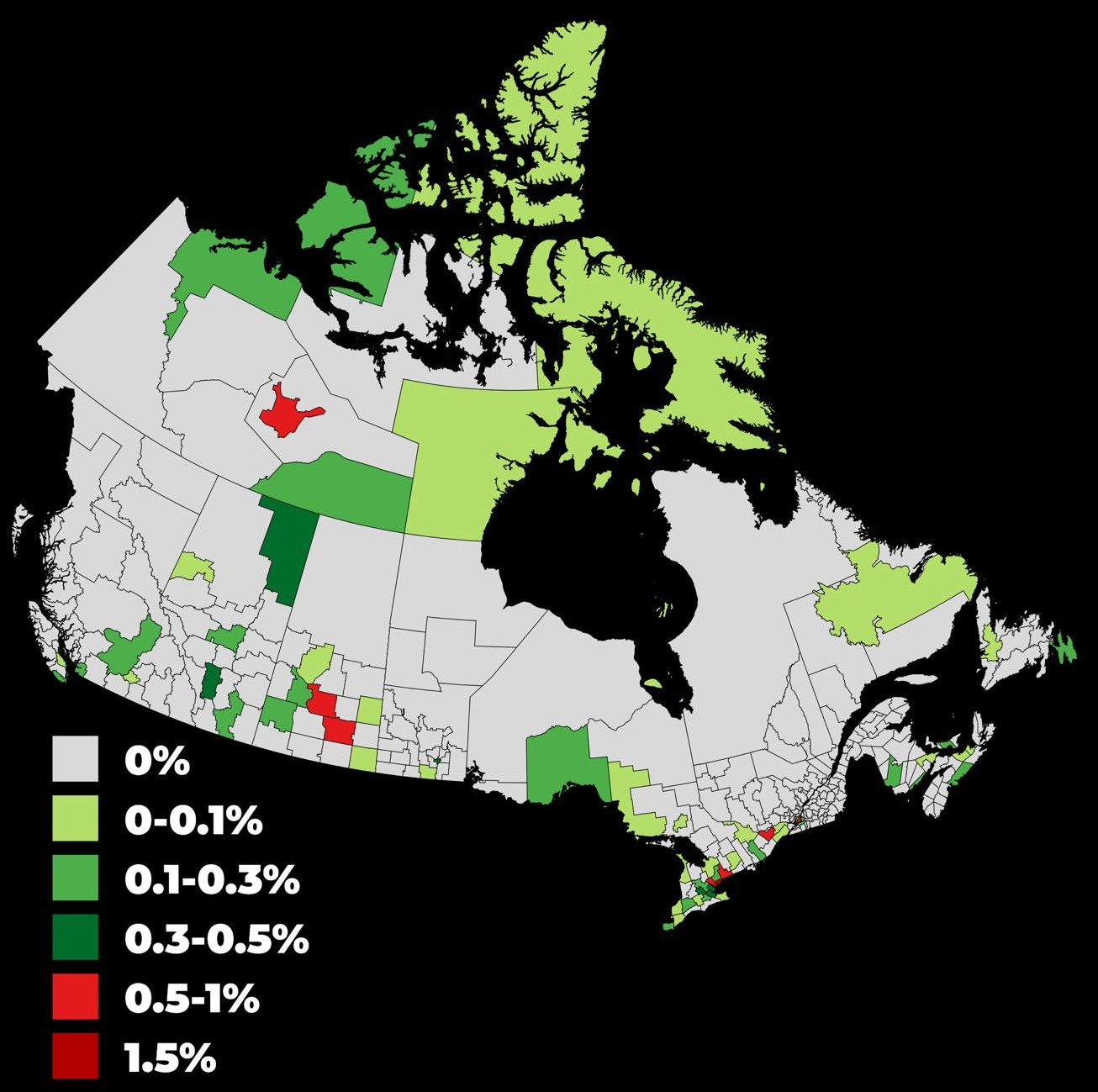
- Population distribution of Bangladeshi Canadians by census division, 2021 census

Total population
- 120,000

Regions with significant populations
- Greater Toronto; Greater Vancouver; Montreal; Calgary; Edmonton; Ottawa

Languages
- English; French; Bengali (Puran Dhakaiya, Noakhailla, Sylheti); Meitei (Manipuri)

Religion
- Predominantly Muslim; Minority Hindu, Christian or Irreligious

Related ethnic groups
- Bangladeshi diaspora, Indo-Canadians, Pakistani Canadians, Asian Canadians

Bangladeshi Canadians (French: Canadiens Bangladais, Bengali: কানাডীয় বাংলাদেশী, romanized: Kanaḍīyô Bangladeshī) are Canadian citizens of Bangladeshi descent, first-generation Bangladeshi immigrants, or descendants of Bangladeshis who immigrated to Canada from East Bengal. The term may also refer to people who hold dual Bangladeshi and Canadian citizenship. Categorically, Bangladeshi Canadians comprise a subgroup of South Asian Canadians which is a further subgroup of Asian Canadians.

== Demography ==
=== Population ===
While there are no recent official data, however according to the Statistics Canada (2020) there are 100,000 Bangladeshi origin Canadians. Some references show fewer of Bangladesh origin in Canada. The unofficial number of Bangladeshi Canadians as of 2016 is anywhere from 50,000 to 100,000. as of 2021, 26,650 Bangladeshis lived in the City of Toronto, according to Statistics Canada.

=== Immigration ===
Landing year	Total landed
2006	4012
2007	2897
2008	2939
2009	2106
2010	4721
2011	2694
2012	2634
2013	3792
2014	2231
2015	3305
2016	3230
2017	3190
2018	3205
2019–2022	over 100,000

Over 100,000 new permanent residents from Bangladesh landed in Canada.

=== Religion ===
Bangladeshi Canadian demography by religion
Religious group	2021 (Note: Religious breakdown proportions based on "Bangladeshi" ethnic or cultural origin response on the 2021 census.)	
Religious group	Pop.	%
Islam	63,190	83.78%
Hinduism	5,505	7.3%
Irreligion	3,855	5.11%
Christianity	2,205	2.92%
Buddhism	595	0.79%
Sikhism	35	0.05%
Judaism	10	0.01%
Indigenous spirituality	0	0%
Other	35	0.05%
Total Bangladeshi Canadian population	75,425	100%

== Notable Bangladeshi-Canadians ==
- Doly Begum, politician
- Amit Chakma, 10th president of University of Western Ontario
- Neamat Imam, writer
- Mizan Rahman, mathematician and writer
- Shamit Shome, soccer player
- Lutfor Rahman Riton, poet
- Rafiqul Islam, proposer of International Mother Language Day on 21 February
- Tanveer Shahnawaz, politician
- Surendra Kumar Sinha, 21st Chief Justice of Bangladesh.

== See also ==
- Asian Canadians
- Bangladeshi British Columbians
- Bangladesh–Canada relations
- Islam in Canada
- South Asian Canadians
- Begum Para, Canada
- Bangladeshi Americans
- Bangladeshi Australians
- Bangladeshis in the United Kingdom
