= Matthew Kellway =

Canadian economist and politician

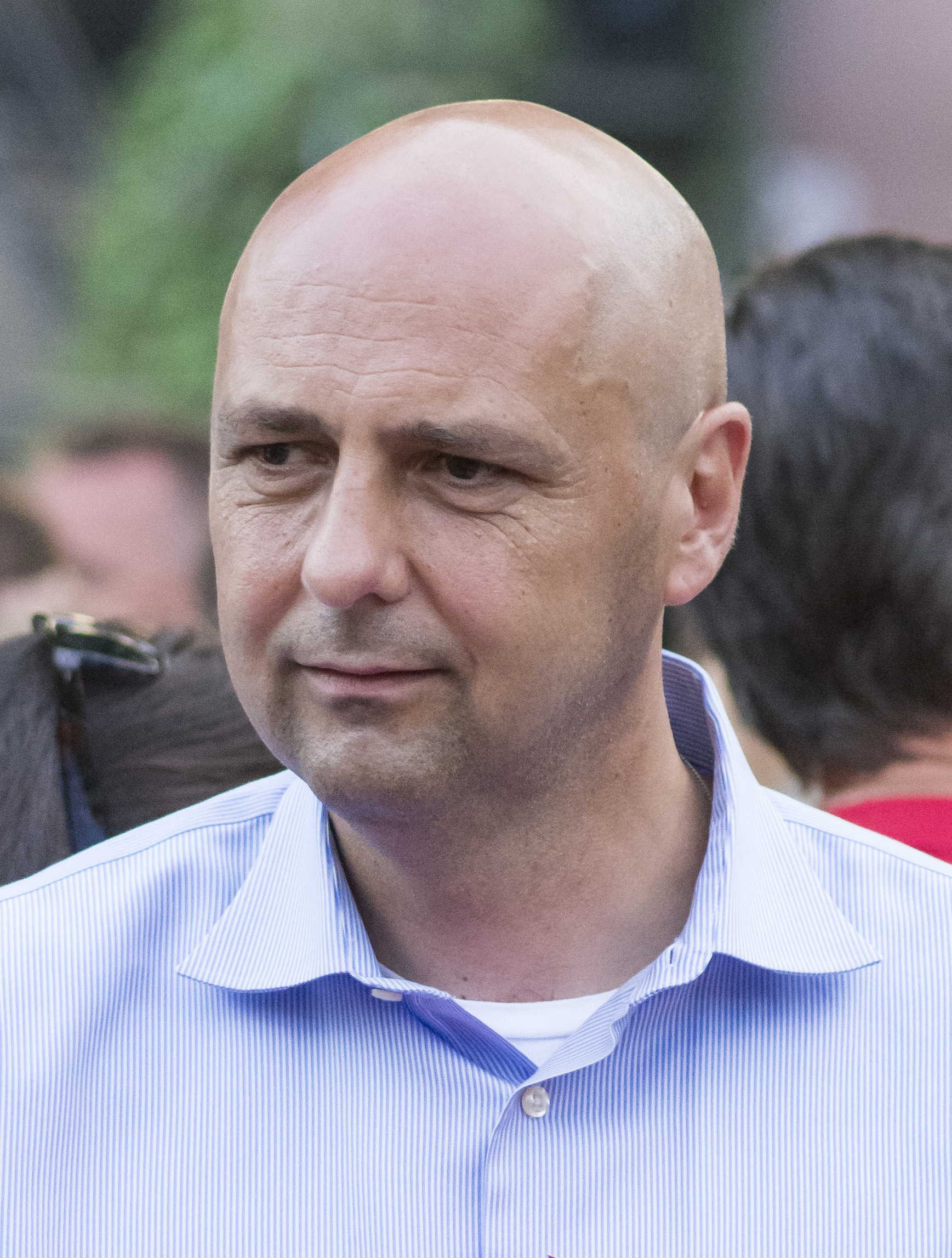
- Kellway in 2015

Member of Parliament for Beaches—East York
- In office May 2, 2011 – August 4, 2015
- Preceded by: Maria Minna
- Succeeded by: Nathaniel Erskine-Smith

Personal details
- Born: December 10, 1964 (age 61) Hull, Quebec, Canada
- Party: New Democrat
- Spouse: Donna
- Children: 3
- Education: Queen's University; University of Toronto; York University
- Profession: Economist, policy analyst

Matthew Kellway (born December 10, 1964) is a Canadian economist and former politician. He was a New Democratic Member of Parliament for the Toronto riding of Beaches—East York from 2011 to 2015. In the 2018 municipal election he came in second in Ward 19 for the Toronto City Council.

== Background ==
Kellway spent much of his childhood in Kingston. He has a degree in political science from Queen's University, and a Master of Industrial Relations degree from the University of Toronto. He also pursued graduate studies at York University.

He worked as an economist and as a policy analyst with the Society of Energy Professionals. He was co-chair of the Toronto Energy Coalition, and chair of the St. John Catholic School Parent Council. He served as president of the Beaches-East York NDP Riding Association for four terms.

Kellway is married to Donna, who is a crown attorney. They have three children and live in the Beaches neighbourhood.

Since February 2016, he has worked for the Society of Energy Professionals, a Toronto-based local of the International Federation of Professional & Technical Engineers labour union, where he is special assistant to the president and manager, central functions.

== Politics ==
=== Federal ===
In the 2011 federal election he ran as the New Democratic candidate in the riding of Beaches—East York. He defeated longtime Liberal incumbent Maria Minna by 5,298 votes. He served as the opposition critic for urban affairs and infrastructure, as well as deputy critic for transport. In 2015 he was defeated by Liberal candidate Nathaniel Erskine-Smith during an election where the Liberals took every seat in Toronto. He was defeated by over 10,000 votes.

=== Municipal ===
Initially Kellway registered to run in the 2018 municipal election in ward 37. However, after the provincial government reduced the number of wards from 47 to 25 he reregistered to run in ward 19 which conforms to the boundaries of his former federal riding of Beaches-East York. Kellway was endorsed by outgoing councillor Janet Davis, but lost the election to Brad Bradford.

== Electoral record ==
2018 Toronto Municipal Election: Ward 19: Beaches-East York	Vote	%
Brad Bradford	14,286	38.56
Matthew Kellway	13,998	37.78
Joshua Makuch	2,315	6.25
Diane Dyson	1,613	4.35
Veronica Stephen	1,257	3.39
Valérie Maltais	929	2.51
Adam Smith	708	1.91
Brenda MacDonald	601	1.62
Paul Bura	288	0.78
David Del Grande	283	0.76
Morley Rosenberg	248	0.67
Frank Marra	142	0.38
Donald Lamoreux	141	0.38
Norval Bryant	89	0.24
Dragan Cimesa	77	0.21
Paul Murton	74	0.20

2015 Canadian federal election: Beaches—East York
Party	Candidate	Votes	%	±%	Expenditures
Liberal	Nate Erskine-Smith	27,458	49.45	+18.69	$104,089.50
New Democratic	Matthew Kellway	17,113	30.82	-10.82	$129,211.99
Conservative	Bill Burrows	9,124	16.43	-6.31	$35,453.04
Green	Randall Sach	1,433	2.58	-2.02	$3,691.94
Independent	James Sears	254	0.46	–	$35,400.00
Marxist–Leninist	Roger Carter	105	0.19	-0.08	–
Independent	Peter Surjanac	43	0.08	–	$449.62
Total valid votes/expense limit		55,530	99.61		$208,561.84
Total rejected ballots		216	0.39	-0.01	
Turnout		55,746	71.99	+5.33	
Eligible voters		77,440			
Liberal gain from New Democratic		Swing		+14.76	
Source: Elections Canada

2011 Canadian federal election: Beaches—East York
Party	Candidate	Votes	%	±%	Expenditures
New Democratic	Matthew Kellway	20,265	41.64	+9.51	$ 68,735.05
Liberal	Maria Minna	14,967	30.75	-10.22	$ 83,269.97
Conservative	Bill Burrows	11,067	22.74	+5.66	$ 32,786.98
Green	Aaron Cameron	2,240	4.60	-4.88	$ 12,901.50
Marxist–Leninist	Roger Carter	130	0.27	-0.07	
Total valid votes/expense limit		48,669	99.61	–	
Total rejected ballots		193	0.39	+0.02	
Turnout		48,862	66.66	+3.73	
Eligible voters		73,302	–	–	
New Democratic gain from Liberal		Swing		+9.86	
