= Tanveer Shahnawaz =

Canadian politician

Tanveer Shahnawaz MP

Member of Parliament for Beaches—East York
- Incumbent
- Assumed office August 31, 2026
- Preceded by: Nathaniel Erskine-Smith

Personal details
- Born: 1995 (age 30–31) East York, Ontario, Canada
- Party: Liberal
- Education: University of Toronto Scarborough (BA)

Tanveer Shahnawaz (born 1995) is a Canadian politician who has served as the member of Parliament (MP) for Beaches—East York since winning a by-election on August 31, 2026. A member of the Liberal Party of Canada, he previously worked for his predecessor, Nathaniel Erskine-Smith, for approximately a decade.

== Early life and education ==
Shahnawaz was born and raised in the Crescent Town neighbourhood of East York, Toronto, and continued to live in the neighbourhood as an adult. He is of Bangladeshi descent and has been active in Toronto's Bangladeshi community.

Shahnawaz attended the University of Toronto Scarborough, where he earned a degree in political science.

== Career and community involvement ==
Shahnawaz became involved with Erskine-Smith's federal political career during the 2015 Canadian federal election, volunteering on his campaign in Beaches—East York. He subsequently joined Erskine-Smith's staff and spent approximately a decade working with him and serving constituents in the riding.

Shahnawaz eventually became manager of Erskine-Smith's constituency office. His work included assisting constituents with federal government programs and services and helping community organizations obtain federal funding. He later served as a special adviser to Erskine-Smith while the latter was Minister of Housing and Infrastructure, working on housing and infrastructure issues.

Shahnawaz was also co-chair of the Taylor-Massey and Oakridge Community Response Team. During the COVID-19 pandemic, he worked with East Toronto Health Partners and community organizations to establish mobile vaccination clinics in underserved neighbourhoods. He also worked with Danforth Families for Safe Communities, a group formed following the 2018 Danforth shooting, in its advocacy for stronger gun-control measures.

== Political career ==
=== Liberal nomination ===
Erskine-Smith resigned from the House of Commons in July 2026, triggering a federal by-election in Beaches—East York. Shahnawaz sought the Liberal nomination to succeed his former employer and received Erskine-Smith's endorsement.

The nomination attracted several candidates. The Liberal Party set July 7, the date of Erskine-Smith's resignation announcement, as the membership cut-off for participation in the nomination. The decision attracted criticism because prospective candidates could not recruit new members after the contest began. Shahnawaz, who had managed Erskine-Smith's constituency office, entered the contest with longstanding connections to the local Liberal organization.

The nomination meeting was held at Gledhill Junior Public School on July 18, 2026. Shahnawaz defeated Summer Nudel, former Ontario MPP Arthur Potts, and Claire Seaborn in a ranked-ballot vote in which 873 ballots were cast. He became the Liberal candidate in the August 31 by-election.

=== 2026 federal by-election ===
During the campaign, Shahnawaz emphasized his longstanding ties to the riding and his experience working in Erskine-Smith's office. Among the local issues on which he campaigned was opposition to the Ontario government's proposed expansion of Billy Bishop Toronto City Airport. He won the August 31 by-election, succeeding Erskine-Smith as the riding's member of Parliament.

== Electoral history ==
Canadian federal by-election, August 31, 2026: Beaches—East York Resignation of Nate Erskine-Smith
| Party | Candidate | Votes | % | ±% |
|---|---|---|---|---|
| Liberal | Tanveer Shahnawaz | 18,504 | 55.84 | -11.90 |
| New Democratic | Shannon Devine | 8,496 | 25.64 | +18.78 |
| Conservative | Jim Syrbos | 5,142 | 15.52 | -8.02 |
| Green | Bruce Livesey | 581 | 1.75 | +0.47 |
| People's | Michel Lachance | 249 | 0.75 | — |
| Canadian Future | Cameron Thomas | 165 | 0.50 | — |
| Total valid votes | | 33,137 | | |
| Total rejected ballots | | 111 | | |
| Turnout | | 33,248 | 40.82 | -31.12 |
| Eligible voters | | 81,460 | | |
| Liberal hold | | Swing | | -15.51 |
Source: Elections Canada
