= Beaches—East York (federal electoral district) =

Federal electoral district in Ontario, Canada

Coordinates: 43°41′06″N 79°18′58″W

Ontario electoral district
- Interactive map of riding boundaries from the 2025 federal election

Federal electoral district
- Legislature: House of Commons
MP
Tanveer Shahnawaz
Liberal
- District created: 1987
- First contested: 1988
- Last contested: 2026
- District webpage: profile, map

Demographics
- Population (2021): 109,359
- Electors (2019): 80,981
- Area (km²): 16.64
- Pop. density (per km²): 6,572.1
- Census division: Toronto
- Census subdivision: Toronto (part)

Beaches—East York (formerly Beaches—Woodbine) is a federal electoral district in Toronto, Ontario, Canada, that has been represented in the House of Commons of Canada since 1988. This riding is situated east of Toronto's downtown.

According to the 2016 census, Beaches—East York has a population of 109,468 and is not known for its ethnic diversity compared to other ridings in Toronto. Consequently, it is 63.9% white, and has the highest percentage of people of English (24.2%), Canadian (19.7%), and Scottish (18.9%) ethnic origins of all ridings in the City of Toronto.

This riding has been historically represented by the political centre to left, with Maria Minna (Liberal) being its longest representative to date, holding the office for six terms. This riding has been represented by the Liberals and NDP for decades with majority of the races taking place between the two parties. The Conservatives placed second for the first time in the 2025 election, before falling back to third in the 2026 by-election.

== Geography ==
Beaches—East York is bordered by Coxwell Avenue to the west, the Don River and Sunrise Avenue to the north, Victoria Park Avenue to the east, and Lake Ontario to the south. The riding contains the neighbourhoods of the Beaches, Upper Beaches, East Danforth, O'Connor–Parkview, and part of Old East York.

== History ==
The federal riding of Beaches—Woodbine was created before the 1988 federal election from Beaches and York East ridings. Before the 1997 federal election, it adopted its current name.

The original boundary of the riding of Beaches-Woodbine began where the southern extension of Leslie Street intersects with Lake Ontario, proceeds north along Leslie Street, then east along Queen Street East, north along Greenwood Avenue, east along Gerrard Street East, and north along Coxwell Avenue until it turns into Coxwell Blvd. at O'Connor Drive.

It continues a short distance along this street where the boundary extends until it meets Taylor-Massey Creek. It follows the creek west (downstream) until it meets the Don River East Branch. The boundary follows the river northeast (upstream) until it meets the point where a westerly extension of Sunrise Avenue intersects with the river course.

The boundary continues east along Sunrise Avenue until it meets Victoria Park Avenue. The boundary turns south and follows the street south until it ends at Lake Ontario. The boundary follows the lake coast back west until it meets the beginning point.

In 2003, the western boundary was altered so that the portion west of Coxwell Avenue was transferred to the neighbouring riding of Toronto-Danforth. This riding was unchanged after the 2012 electoral redistribution.

=== Members of Parliament ===
Since its creation as Beaches-Woodbine in 1988, Beaches—East York has been contested between Liberal and New Democratic candidates, with both parties nearly doubling Conservative vote totals.

==== Pre-2011 ====
Hon. Maria Minna represented Beaches-East York for a record 18 straight years, as a member of Prime Minister Jean Chrétien's and Prime Minister Paul Martin’s governments, and as a member of Her Majesty’s Loyal Opposition under Liberal Leaders Stéphane Dion and Michael Ignatieff.

==== 2011 ====
In the 2011 election the riding was won by New Democratic Party candidate Matthew Kellway, beating out Liberal incumbent Maria Minna by nearly 11%.

==== 2015 ====
Nathaniel Erskine-Smith defeated Matthew Kellway in the 2015 election by 10,345 votes. 2015 was Nathaniel Erskine-Smith’s first federal election.

==== 2019 ====
The incumbent MP Nathaniel Erskine-Smith was re-elected with 32,168 votes. Mae J Nam was acclaimed as the NDP candidate on May 28, 2019 and was the runner-up, receiving 12,196 votes.

==== Summary ====
Beaches—East York has elected the following members of Parliament:

Parliament	Years	Member	Party
Beaches—Woodbine; Riding created from Beaches and York East
34th	1988–1993	Neil Young	New Democratic
35th	1993–1997	Maria Minna	Liberal
Beaches—East York
36th	1997–2000	Maria Minna	Liberal
37th	2000–2004	Maria Minna	Liberal
38th	2004–2006	Maria Minna	Liberal
39th	2006–2008	Maria Minna	Liberal
40th	2008–2011	Maria Minna	Liberal
41st	2011–2015	Matthew Kellway	New Democratic
42nd	2015–2019	Nathaniel Erskine-Smith	Liberal
43rd	2019–2021	Nathaniel Erskine-Smith	Liberal
44th	2021–2025	Nathaniel Erskine-Smith	Liberal
45th	2025–2026	Nathaniel Erskine-Smith	Liberal
45th	2026–present	Tanveer Shahnawaz	Liberal

== Demographics ==
According to the 2021 Canadian census

Languages: 67.9% English, 2.8% Bengali, 2.2% Cantonese, 1.8% French, 1.7% Greek, 1.6% Spanish, 1.4% Tagalog, 1.2% Urdu, 1.0% Italian

Religions: 43.3% Christian (20.0% Catholic, 5.3% Christian Orthodox, 4.1% Anglican, 2.7% United Church, 11.2% Other), 9.1% Muslim, 2.8% Hindu, 1.7% Jewish, 1.1% Buddhist, 40.6% None

Median income: $44,000 (2020)

Average income: $69,500 (2020)

Racial groups in Beaches—East York (2011−2021)
Racial group	2021		2016		2011	
Racial group	Pop.	%	Pop.	%	Pop.	%
White (Note: Statistic includes all persons that did not make up part of a visible minority or an indigenous identity.)	67,300	62.03%	69,965	64.52%	70,455	66.45%
South Asian	12,290	11.33%	11,820	10.9%	11,015	10.39%
Black	8,260	7.61%	7,130	6.58%	5,805	5.47%
Chinese	5,635	5.19%	6,155	5.68%	6,060	5.72%
Filipino	3,565	3.29%	3,455	3.19%	3,435	3.24%
Latin American	2,225	2.05%	1,490	1.37%	1,310	1.24%
Indigenous	1,980	1.82%	2,055	1.9%	1,990	1.88%
West Asian	1,260	1.16%	985	0.91%	935	0.88%
Arab	720	0.66%	680	0.63%	510	0.48%
Southeast Asian	715	0.66%	765	0.71%	1,125	1.06%
Korean	705	0.65%	725	0.67%	405	0.38%
Japanese	635	0.59%	740	0.68%	565	0.53%
Other (Note: "Visible minority, n.i.e.")	920	0.85%	925	0.85%	920	0.87%
Multiple races (Note: "Multiple visible minorities" under visible minority section on census.)	2,280	2.1%	1,545	1.42%	1,495	1.41%
Total responses	108,500	99.21%	108,435	99.06%	106,030	99.02%
Total population	109,359	100%	109,468	100%	107,084	100%
Notes: Totals greater than 100% due to multiple origin responses. Demographics based on 2012 Canadian federal electoral redistribution riding boundaries.

== Election results ==
Graph of general election results in Beaches—Woodbine, Beaches—East York (minor parties that never got 2% of the vote or didn't run consistently are omitted)

=== Beaches—East York ===
Graph of general election results in Beaches—East York (minor parties that never got 2% of the vote or didn't run consistently are omitted)

Canadian federal by-election, August 31, 2026 Resignation of Nate Erskine-Smith
** Preliminary results — Not yet official **
Party	Candidate	Votes	%	±%
Liberal	Tanveer Shahnawaz	18,361	55.68	-12.06
New Democratic	Shannon Devine	8,512	25.82	+18.96
Conservative	Jim Syrbos	5,116	15.52	-8.02
Green	Bruce Livesey	573	1.74	+0.46
People's	Michel Lachance	248	0.75	—
Canadian Future	Cameron Thomas	163	0.49	—
Total valid votes		32,973		
Total rejected ballots				
Turnout		32,973	40.39	-31.55
Eligible voters		81,460		
Liberal hold		Swing		-15.51
Source: Elections Canada

2025 Canadian federal election
Party	Candidate	Votes	%	±%	Expenditures
Liberal	Nate Erskine-Smith	39,804	67.75	+11.17	$119,113.28
Conservative	Jocelyne Poirier	13,830	23.54	+9.19	$47,999.71
New Democratic	Shannon Devine	4,027	6.85	−15.67	$56,544.86
Green	Jack Pennings	748	1.27	−1.44	$0.00
Independent	Diane Joseph	161	0.27	N/A	$0.00
Communist	Elizabeth Rowley	146	0.25	−0.01	$0.00
Marxist–Leninist	Steve Rutchinski	39	0.07	−0.03	$0.00
Total valid votes/expense limit		58,755	99.47	+0.13	$128,551.93
Total rejected ballots		311	0.53	–0.13	
Turnout		59,066	71.94	+7.03	
Eligible voters		82,102			
Liberal hold		Swing		+0.99	
Source: Elections Canada

2021 Canadian federal election
Party	Candidate	Votes	%	±%	Expenditures
Liberal	Nathaniel Erskine-Smith	28,919	56.58	-0.62	$84,476.95
New Democratic	Alejandra Ruiz Vargas	11,513	22.52	+1.16	$34,400.36
Conservative	Lisa Robinson*	7,336	14.35	+0.29	$20,930.77
People's	Radu Rautescu	1,613	3.16	+1.70	$0.00
Green	Reuben Anthony DeBoer	1,388	2.72	-3.20	$1,906.03
Independent	Karen Lee Wilde	166	0.32		$0.00
Communist	Jennifer Moxon	131	0.26		$0.00
Marxist–Leninist	Philip Fernandez	50	0.10		$0.00
Total valid votes/expense limit		51,116	99.34	–	$110,305.28
Total rejected ballots		340	0.66	+0.07	
Turnout		51,456	64.91	-5.25	
Eligible voters		79,273			
Liberal hold		Swing		-0.89	
Source: Elections Canada *After the ballots had been printed, but before the election day itself, Robinson was dropped by the party as the CPC candidate. She would not have been admitted to the Conservative caucus had she won.

2019 Canadian federal election
Party	Candidate	Votes	%	±%	Expenditures
Liberal	Nathaniel Erskine-Smith	32,647	57.20	+7.75	$74,562.95
New Democratic	Mae J. Nam	12,196	21.37	-9.45	$91,821.20
Conservative	Nadirah Nazeer	8,026	14.06	-2.37	$ 73,545.89
Green	Sean Manners	3,378	5.92	+3.34	none listed
People's	Deborah McKenzie	831	1.46	-	$1,821.54
Total valid votes/expense limit		57,078	99.41		
Total rejected ballots		340	0.59	+0.20	
Turnout		57,418	70.16	-1.83	
Eligible voters		81,842			
Liberal hold		Swing		+8.60	
Source: Elections Canada

2015 Canadian federal election
Party	Candidate	Votes	%	±%	Expenditures
Liberal	Nathaniel Erskine-Smith	27,458	49.45	+18.69	$104,089.50
New Democratic	Matthew Kellway	17,113	30.82	-10.82	$129,211.99
Conservative	Bill Burrows	9,124	16.43	-6.31	$35,453.04
Green	Randall Sach	1,433	2.58	-2.02	$3,691.94
Independent	James Sears	254	0.46	–	$35,400.00
Marxist–Leninist	Roger Carter	105	0.19	-0.08	–
Independent	Peter Surjanac	43	0.08	–	$449.62
Total valid votes/expense limit		55,530	99.61		$208,561.84
Total rejected ballots		216	0.39	-0.01	
Turnout		55,746	71.99	+5.33	
Eligible voters		77,440			
Liberal gain from New Democratic		Swing		+14.76	
Source: Elections Canada

2011 Canadian federal election
Party	Candidate	Votes	%	±%	Expenditures
New Democratic	Matthew Kellway	20,265	41.64	+9.51	$ 68,735.05
Liberal	Maria Minna	14,967	30.75	-10.22	$ 83,269.97
Conservative	Bill Burrows	11,067	22.74	+5.66	$ 32,786.98
Green	Aaron Cameron	2,240	4.60	-4.88	$ 12,901.50
Marxist–Leninist	Roger Carter	130	0.27	-0.07	
Total valid votes/expense limit		48,669	99.61	–	
Total rejected ballots		193	0.39	+0.02	
Turnout		48,862	66.66	+3.73	
Eligible voters		73,302	–	–	
New Democratic gain from Liberal		Swing		+9.86	

2008 Canadian federal election
Party	Candidate	Votes	%	±%	Expenditures
Liberal	Maria Minna	18,967	40.97	+0.58	$76,404
New Democratic	Marilyn Churley	14,875	32.13	-2.83	$75,350
Conservative	Caroline Alleslev	7,907	17.08	-0.96	$21,853
Green	Zoran Markovski	4,389	9.48	+3.41	$22,434
Marxist–Leninist	Roger Carter	155	0.33	+0.16	
Total valid votes/expense limit		46,293	99.63		$82,179
Total rejected ballots		172	0.37	+0.04	
Turnout		46,465	62.93	-7.58	
Eligible voters		73,832			
Liberal hold		Swing		+1.71	

2006 Canadian federal election
Party	Candidate	Votes	%	±%	Expenditures
Liberal	Maria Minna	20,678	40.39	-7.54	$73,454.03
New Democratic	Marilyn Churley	17,900	34.96	+2.67	$74,996.37
Conservative	Peter Conroy	9,238	18.04	+3.98	$74,667.09
Green	Jim Harris	3,106	6.07	+1.53	$9,644.25
Progressive Canadian	Jim Love	183	0.36		$244.26
Marxist–Leninist	Roger Carter	91	0.18	+0.08	
Total valid votes		51,196	99.67		
Total rejected ballots		168	0.33	-0.11	
Turnout		51,364	70.51	+6.49	
Eligible voters		72,844			
Liberal hold		Swing		-5.10	
Sources: Official Results, Elections Canada and Financial Returns, Elections Canada.

2004 Canadian federal election
Party	Candidate	Votes	%	±%
Liberal	Maria Minna	22,494	47.93	−5.29
New Democratic	Peter Tabuns	15,156	32.29	+11.77
Conservative	Nick Nikopoulos	6,603	14.07	−8.53
Green	Peter Davison	2,127	4.53	
Marijuana	Daniel Dufresne	365	0.78	
Independent	Edward Slota	80	0.17	
Communist	Miguel Figueroa	62	0.13	
Marxist–Leninist	Roger Carter	46	0.10	
Total valid votes		46,933	99.57	
Total rejected ballots		204	0.43	
Turnout		47,137	64.02	
Eligible voters		73,623		
Liberal hold		Swing		-8.53
Change is computed from the 2000 redistributed results. Conservative vote is compared to the total of the Canadian Alliance vote and Progressive Conservative vote in 2000 election.

2000 federal election redistributed results
Party	Vote	%
Liberal	21,905	53.22
New Democratic	8,449	20.53
Progressive Conservative	5,574	13.54
Canadian Alliance	3,728	9.06
Others	1,506	3.66

2000 Canadian federal election
Party	Candidate	Votes	%	±%	Expenditures
Liberal	Maria Minna	22,515	52.74	+4.81	$61,974
New Democratic	Mel Watkins	8,936	20.93	−2.61	$54,232
Progressive Conservative	Wayne Clutterbuck	5,766	13.51	+1.20	$13,989
Alliance	Abu Alam	3,838	8.99	−5.35	$9,047
Marijuana	Bruce Watson	682	1.60		none listed
Green	James Mendel	599	1.40	+0.11	$102
Canadian Action	Randall Whitcomb	128	0.30		none listed
Natural Law	Donalda Fredeen	88	0.21	-0.37	none listed
Communist	Ann Nicholson	82	0.19		$202
Marxist–Leninist	Steve Rutchinski	53	0.12		$8
Total valid votes		42,687	99.58		
Total rejected ballots		179	0.42	-0.23	
Turnout		42,866	56.94	-10.39	
Electors on the lists		75,284			
Liberal hold		Swing		+3.71	
Note: Canadian Alliance vote is compared to the Reform vote in 1997 election. Sources: Official Results, Elections Canada and Financial Returns, Elections Canada.

1997 Canadian federal election
Party	Candidate	Votes	%	±%
Liberal	Maria Minna	21,844	47.93	+5.79
New Democratic	Mel Watkins	10,730	23.55	+7.34
Reform	Gary Miller	6,534	14.34	-2.12
Progressive Conservative	Jack Simpson	5,611	12.31	+0.13
Green	John Scheer	589	1.20	
Natural Law	Donalda Fredeen	264	0.58	
Total valid votes		45,572	99.35	
Total rejected ballots		296	0.65	
Turnout		45,868	67.33	
Eligible voters		68,127		
Liberal notional hold		Swing		-0.77

1993 federal election redistributed results
Party	Vote	%
Liberal	20,096	42.14
Reform	7,850	16.46
New Democratic	7,728	16.21
Progressive Conservative	5,811	12.19
Others	6,199	13.00

=== Beaches—Woodbine ===
Graph of general election results in Beaches—Woodbine (minor parties that never got 2% of the vote or didn't run consistently are omitted)

1993 Canadian federal election
Party	Candidate	Votes	%	±%
Liberal	Maria Minna	17,639	40.73	+7.48
New Democratic	Neil Young	8,037	18.56	-16.61
Reform	Hugh Prendergast	6,844	15.80	+15.02
Independent	Terry Kelly	4,549	10.50	
Progressive Conservative	Denise Cole	4,316	9.97	-19.28
National	John-Frederick Cameron	1,139	2.63	
Green	Leane Haze	335	0.77	+0.07
Natural Law	Donalda Fredeen	265	0.61	
Marxist–Leninist	Pierre Chénier	94	0.22	
Independent	Keith Meadowcroft	66	0.15	
Abolitionist	Zahid Tirmizi	22	0.05	
Total valid votes		43,306	98.92	
Total rejected ballots		474	1.08	+0.50
Turnout		43,780	66.07	-8.80
Eligible voters		66,267		
Liberal gain from New Democratic		Swing		+12.05

1988 Canadian federal election
Party	Candidate	Votes	%	±%
New Democratic	Neil Young	15,760	35.17	+0.3
Liberal	Terry Kelly	14,900	33.25	+8.1
Progressive Conservative	Jim O'Malley	13,107	29.25	-8.2
Libertarian	Dennis Corrigan	351	0.78	
Green	Michael Tegtmeyer	317	0.71	
Independent	Ronald Clifford	259	0.58	
Independent	Wally Pearson	71	0.16	
Commonwealth of Canada	Charles Odell	48	0.11	
Total valid votes		44,813	99.42	
Total rejected ballots		262	0.58	
Turnout		45,075	74.87	
Eligible voters		60,205		
New Democratic notional gain from Progressive Conservative		Swing		+4.2

1984 federal election redistributed results
Party	%
Progressive Conservative	37.4
New Democratic	34.9
Liberal	25.1
Others	2.6

== See also ==
- List of Canadian electoral districts
- Historical federal electoral districts of Canada
