= Nate Erskine-Smith =

Canadian politician and lawyer (born 1984)

The Honourable Nate Erskine-Smith PC
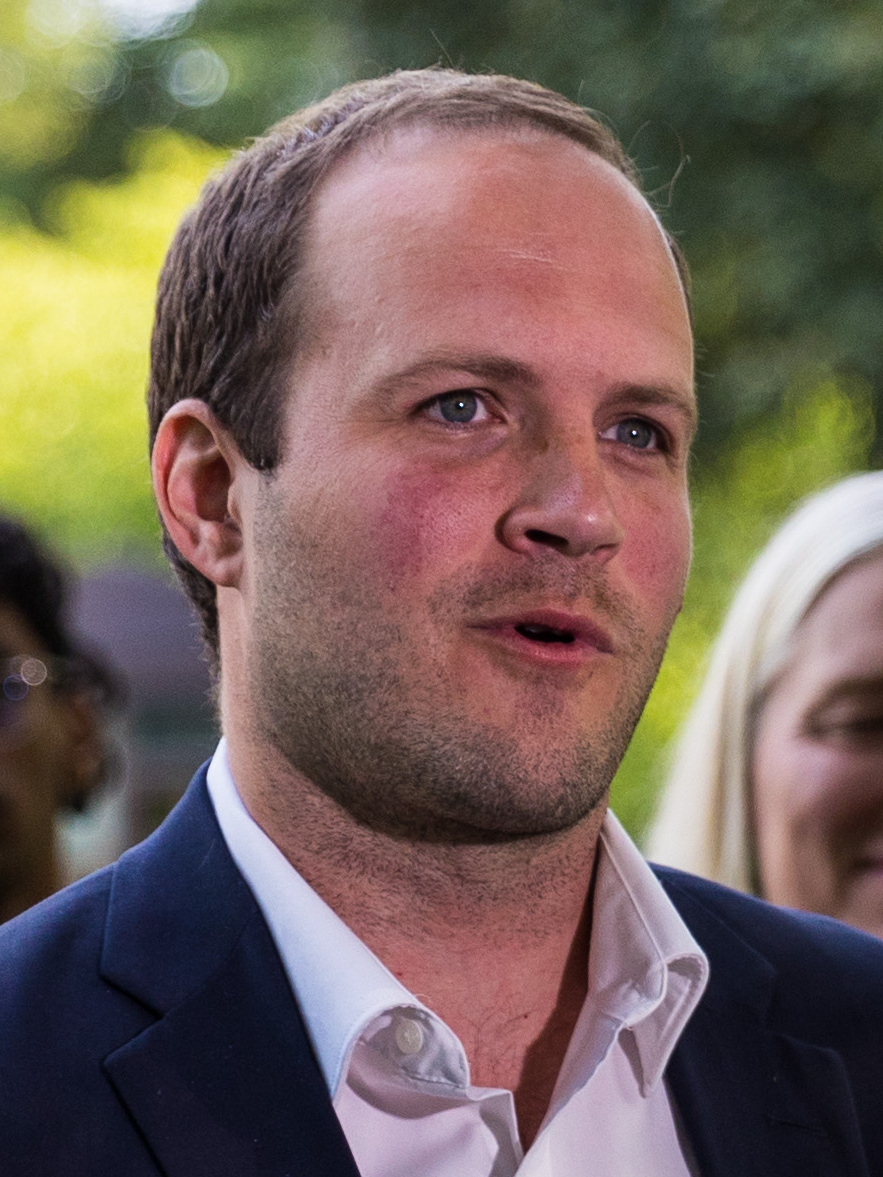
- Erskine-Smith in 2023

Toronto City Councillor for Ward 19 Beaches—East York
- Incumbent
- Assumed office November 15, 2026
- Preceded by: Brad Bradford

Chair of the Toronto Planning and Housing Committee
- Incumbent
- Assumed office November 19, 2026
- Mayor: Olivia Chow
- Preceded by: Gord Perks

Member of Parliament for Beaches—East York
- In office October 19, 2015 – July 7, 2026
- Preceded by: Matthew Kellway
- Succeeded by: Tanveer Shahnawaz

Minister of Housing, Infrastructure and Communities
- In office December 20, 2024 – May 13, 2025
- Prime Minister: Justin Trudeau; Mark Carney
- Preceded by: Sean Fraser
- Succeeded by: Gregor Robertson

Personal details
- Born: June 15, 1984 (age 42) Toronto, Ontario, Canada
- Party: Independent (Note: In Ontario, municipal politicians are elected on a non-partisan basis.)
- Other political affiliations: Liberal (federal); Ontario Liberal (provincial)
- Spouse: Amy Symington
- Children: 2
- Education: Queen's University (BA, JD); University College, Oxford (BCL)
- Profession: Lawyer, politician, media personality
- Website: Campaign website: nateerskinesmith.ca Constituency website: beynate.ca Podcast/blog: uncommons.ca

Nathaniel Erskine-Smith (born June 15, 1984) is a Canadian lawyer and politician who has represented Ward 19 Beaches—East York on Toronto City Council since 2026. Erskine-Smith has been chair of the city's Planning and Housing Committee since November 2026. He was federal Minister of Housing, Infrastructure and Communities from December 2024 to May 2025 and served as a member of Parliament (MP) from 2015 to 2026. A member of the Liberal Party, he represented Beaches—East York in the House of Commons. Before entering politics, Erskine-Smith was a commercial litigation lawyer.

Erskine-Smith was elected to Parliament in the 2015 federal election. During his tenure as an MP, Erskine-Smith was known for his political independence; he has been characterized as a "maverick" and has broken from his party on motions supporting electoral reform, calling a public inquiry into the SNC-Lavelin affair and was one of two Liberals to support a New Democratic Party (NDP) motion to advance national pharmacare. In 2024, he became housing minister in Prime Minister Justin Trudeau's cabinet and remained in the role after Prime Minister Mark Carney took office, however, he was replaced in a cabinet shuffle following the 2025 federal election. Also a member of the provincial Ontario Liberal Party, Erskine-Smith was the runner-up in the party's 2023 leadership election as well as a prospective candidate in the upcoming 2026 race. However, in May 2026, he was unsuccessful in seeking the party's nomination for the Scarborough Southwest provincial by-election and appealed the nomination due to allegations of irregularities. Erskine-Smith later resigned from Parliament on July 7, 2026.

After leaving federal politics, Erskine-Smith was encouraged to run for Toronto City Council by Mayor Olivia Chow. He announced in August 2026 that he would seek to represent Ward 19 Beaches—East York and was elected in the 2026 municipal election.

== Early life and education ==
Erskine-Smith was born on June 15, 1984, in Toronto, Ontario, and attended Bowmore Elementary School and Malvern Collegiate Institute. His parents, Sara Erskine and Lawrence Smith, were public school teachers. He has a brother.

Erskine-Smith attended Queen's University, where he completed a Bachelor of Arts degree in politics in 2007 before completing law school in 2010. While a student at Queen's, Erskine-Smith attempted to start a business selling panini sandwiches. His experience dealing with bureaucracy led him to run unsuccessfully for city council for the Sydenham District in Kingston, Ontario, in the 2006 municipal elections, coming in third despite being endorsed by the Whig-Standard and Queen’s Journal. Erskine-Smith later described his attempt to Althia Raj as "naive", saying that he knocked on no doors and spent his time researching local issues.

Erskine-Smith then went on to study political philosophy and constitutional law at the University of Oxford, where he earned a Master of Laws (BCL) degree in 2013. He focused on the evolution of section 7 of the Canadian Charter of Rights and Freedoms, with references to assisted dying, prostitution and marijuana. In addition, during his time at both universities, he played on their baseball teams as a pitcher.

== Legal career ==
Erskine-Smith practised commercial litigation as an associate at Kramer Simaan Dhillon after working as a law student at Aird & Berlis LLP. He told Raj that he found some advantages in commercial litigation that helped him but felt that he could make a bigger impact advocating for issues that affect more Canadians.

Erskine-Smith also volunteered for the Canadian Civil Liberties Association. He took on pro bono cases for a range of clients and causes, including a civil liberties case to protect religious freedom in Ontario's school system. In a notable civil liberties case in 2014, Erskine-Smith successfully argued against compulsory religious studies at publicly funded high schools in Ontario.

== Political career ==
=== Backbench MP (2015–2024) ===
In November 2013, Erskine-Smith announced his candidacy for the Liberal nomination in Beaches—East York, citing Justin Trudeau's call for more youth involvement in politics, Trudeau's advocacy for empowering MPs, and positive politics as reasons to run. Erskine-Smith based his nomination campaign on lessons learned from his 2006 municipal campaign and signed up nine hundred riding members. In December 2014, he defeated four candidates to become the Liberal nominee.

Erskine-Smith was elected to the House of Commons in the 2015 federal election. He beat incumbent New Democrat MP Matthew Kellway, who was elected in 2011.

Erskine-Smith was vice-chair of the Standing Committee on Access to Information, Privacy and Ethics during the 42nd Parliament.

In the first episode of the television series Political Blind Date in 2017, Erskine-Smith and Conservative MP Garnett Genuis discussed their differing perspectives on the legalization of cannabis in Canada. They also appeared on the last episode in 2022, where they discussed their differing perspectives on addressing Canada's opioid crisis.

Erskine-Smith was re-elected in the 2019 election and 2021 election, in which he received more than twice as many votes as his nearest competitor.

==== Uncommons Podcast ====
At the onset of the COVID-19 pandemic, Erskine-Smith launched the Uncommons Podcast as a substitute for local town hall meetings. The episodes feature prominent guests, including members of all major parties, and often seek to showcase his thinking on a given issue.

In June 2022, Erskine-Smith hosted former Conservative leader Erin O'Toole, who commented on the 2022 Conservative leadership race, expressing his concern that "the populism of anger or frustration or dislocation" can undermine institutions and national unity. In June 2024, fellow Conservative MP Arnold Viersen sent a letter to Erskine-Smith stating that he felt "ambushed" by Erskine-Smith after it was revealed on the podcast that he would ban same-sex marriage and abortion, and that some members of the Conservative caucus felt the same way. Viersen later walked back his podcast comments, and Erskine-Smith, who felt that those views were anathema to most Canadians, told reporters that he was surprised by the letter, stating that Viersen was well known for his anti-abortion advocacy.

In October 2024, Erskine-Smith hosted both Prime Minister Trudeau, who expressed regret over his handling of electoral reform, and Mark Carney, who teased his future political plans and agreed with Erskine-Smith's comments on increasing housing supply so that first-time home buyers could have a home, on separate episodes of the podcast.

==== 2023 Ontario Liberal leadership campaign ====
Erskine-Smith ran for the leadership of the Ontario Liberal Party in the 2023 Ontario Liberal Party leadership election. He positioned himself as a generational-change candidate and distanced himself from previous leaders of the party, criticizing, for example, senior Liberals who wanted Ontario Greens leader Mike Schreiner to lead their party instead. Erskine-Smith focused his campaign on grassroots renewal, rebuilding the party organization, and a political focus on "fairness". He stated that he saw idealism, optimism and rebuilt party operations in the federal Liberals of 2015 and felt that approach should be applied to their provincial counterparts. Erskine-Smith also ran on what he described as "progressive and pragmatic ideas" on issues such as health care, senior care, climate change and wealth inequality.

Erskine-Smith was critical of fellow leadership candidate Bonnie Crombie's desire to move the party to the centre-right because he felt that centre-right governments lacked ambition. A month before the vote, he joined fellow Liberal MP and leadership candidate Yasir Naqvi in a mutual-support pact to rank each other as the second choice in an attempt to defeat Crombie, the perceived front-runner. Both felt that they shared the same priorities during the campaign, that the best way to win the upcoming election was to build a party around Liberal values, and that Crombie's leadership would face criticisms similar to those directed at Premier Doug Ford's Conservatives.

Crombie, however, was elected on the third ballot with 53.4 per cent, ahead of Erskine-Smith, who came in second with 46.6 per cent.

=== Minister of Housing, Infrastructure and Communities (2024–2025) ===
In January 2024, Erskine-Smith announced that he would not be running in the next federal election, but he changed his mind later in the year when Trudeau appointed him minister of housing, infrastructure and communities on December 20, 2024, in a Cabinet shuffle following Sean Fraser's resignation. During a press conference after his appointment to the role, Erskine-Smith stated, "I understand there’s going to be a short runway," and said his goal would be "to make the biggest difference that I can." Due to his appointment, he reversed his initial decision not to run in the 2025 federal election. Erskine-Smith later explained that he talked to his family and got their approval before accepting the position, and cited his comparison of Pierre Poilievre's Conservative ideology to the Reform Party as another reason for his reversal.

In January, Erskine-Smith revealed that he was going to work with the government and push for policies driving supply rather than demand. He reaffirmed the government's support for the Canada Public Transit Fund, which would allow municipalities to modernize their public transit systems by supporting high-density housing and eliminating mandatory minimum parking requirements within eight hundred metres of transit lines. He was publicly critical of the Ontario government for reducing spending on social housing. In March, Erskine-Smith sent a letter to Toronto Mayor Olivia Chow warning that any move to block six-plexes would result in twenty-five per cent less federal funding than had been pledged annually to Toronto from the Housing Accelerator Fund, a program that incentivizes cities to build more housing.

Erskine-Smith remained in that role under the 30th Canadian Ministry of Mark Carney and was re-elected on April 28, 2025, with the largest vote total for an MP in Toronto. However, when Carney reshuffled his cabinet on May 13, 2025, Erskine-Smith was dropped and replaced by Gregor Robertson. After being dropped from cabinet, Erskine-Smith issued a social media statement taking issue with how he had been dropped, expressing disappointment that he and his team would not be able to build upon the work they had started but saying that he would shift his attention elsewhere.

=== Return to the backbenches (2025–2026) ===
Following his departure from cabinet, Erskine-Smith released a video criticizing his government’s budget for failing to live up to expectations on climate, housing and international development assistance. Conservative politicians Chris Warkentin and Melissa Lantsman used the video to argue that there was tension within the Liberal caucus. Erskine-Smith later told Raj that there was no tension and that Carney personally told him that, while they were not going to agree on everything, he liked the video, finding it well-produced and constructive. After a 2025 Toronto Star investigation revealed that illicit drugs were being advertised on Meta platforms such as Facebook and Instagram, Erskine-Smith intended to pass a motion requiring Meta to explain its lack of action in addressing these issues by appearing before the Standing Committee on Industry and Technology. He also viewed this as a double standard because Meta was able to block news content for Canadian users.

On May 12, Erskine-Smith said he would resign his seat in Parliament at the end of June 2026 once the House of Commons rose for its summer break. He said he would have resigned earlier but was asked to delay his resignation by the Prime Minister's Office because the government had only a minority in Parliament until April, when it gained a majority due to floor crossings.

==== Ontario provincial politics ====
After a group of Ontario Liberals called New Leaf Liberals was formed to criticize Crombie's performance in the 2025 Ontario election, Erskine-Smith called for renewal in the party and urged his supporters to register for the Ontario Liberal Party's annual general meeting in September 2025 in order to vote against her in that meeting's leadership review. He backed the New Leaf Liberal demand that Crombie step down if she received the support of less than two-thirds of delegates in the review vote. After Crombie received only 57% support and subsequently resigned the leadership due to a caucus revolt, Erskine-Smith was seen as the presumptive front-runner to succeed her. However, while he admitted that the party was stronger because of her efforts, he was undecided on whether to run a second time for the leadership.

On January 9, 2026, Erskine-Smith teased on his substack that he was exploring seeking the leadership of the Ontario Liberal Party in the upcoming leadership election. Erskine-Smith cited the opportunity to build a party that prioritizes equal opportunity, uses fiscal sustainability to deliver social progress, and supports diverse perspectives with reasonable disagreement. On February 3, he confirmed his intention to seek the provincial Liberal nomination in the by-election in Scarborough Southwest. Erskine-Smith said that his decision was based on the fact that the riding shared the same concerns as Beaches—East York over issues such as housing, public transit, education, health care and economic opportunity. On May 9, Erskine-Smith lost the nomination to party organizer and pizza franchisee Ahsanul Hafiz by 19 votes. During the race, Hafiz and a third opponent, Qadira Jackson, formed a pact encouraging their respective supporters to rank each other second on the ranked ballot, criticizing Erskine-Smith for not residing in the riding and allegedly trying to use their community as a stepping stone for his leadership ambitions.

On May 11, interim Ontario Liberal Party leader John Fraser stated that Erskine-Smith should prove that there were irregularities during the nomination vote. After discussing the matter with his team, Erskine-Smith appealed the outcome the following day, alleging irregularities such as 34 more ballots being counted than were cast—more than the 19-vote margin of victory—as well as the party allowing the use of “Amazon orders” as proof of identity. Erskine-Smith called for a new nomination meeting or for the party to appoint a candidate, while ruling himself out as a candidate. He admitted to Vassy Kapelos that he was less likely to run for the leadership than he had been upon entering the nomination race, feeling that the party did not want to change. Erskine-Smith's appeal was dismissed by the party's three-person arbitration committee, which included former cabinet minister David Zimmer. The committee said that the 34-vote discrepancy was caused by names not being crossed off the voters list when voters received ballots, and that this was a technical administrative error and not an irregularity. Hafiz and the Ontario Liberals later lost the by-election in September, placing second behind the Ontario NDP.

=== Move to municipal politics (2026–present) ===
In June, Erskine-Smith repeated his commitment to resign his federal seat and confirmed that he was considering running in the 2026 Toronto municipal election in Ward 19 Beaches—East York after he and Toronto Mayor Olivia Chow crossed paths and discussed the idea, though he told the Toronto Star that he had not made a decision on his next steps. Erskine-Smith delivered his farewell speech to the House of Commons on June 17, 2026. At his June 25, 2026, retirement party, he confirmed that he would not be running for Ontario Liberal leader but was considering running municipally. He also announced that his resignation from Parliament would take effect July 7, 2026. Erskine-Smith announced his candidacy for Toronto City Council on August 18, 2026, with Chow's endorsement. He was elected city councillor on October 26.

==== Chair of Planning and Housing ====
Erskine-Smith was appointed as the chair of the Planning and Housing Committee in November 2026, also joining the Executive Committee.

== Political views ==
Erskine-Smith has mostly been characterized as a maverick, though others have described him as a progressive or a left-leaning liberal, and he has been noted for breaking with his own party on certain issues. Erskine-Smith, however, has touted his ability to get things done across all parties, describes himself as committed to the grassroots, and modelled his politics after former Liberal prime ministers Pierre Elliott Trudeau and Lester Pearson.

=== Democratic reform ===
==== Political independence ====
During the SNC-Lavalin affair, Erskine-Smith, alongside fellow Liberal MPs Wayne Long and Joyce Murray, publicly advocated that Jody Wilson-Raybould and Jane Philpott should remain part of the Liberal caucus. He wrote an op-ed in the Toronto Star in which he contrasted Sheila Copps and advocated that dissident Liberals should stay in caucus. He pointed out that, despite being a Liberal MP who supported his government, his party should abide by its 2015 campaign promise to empower MPs and their communities by having more free votes in the House of Commons. Erskine-Smith believed that this could strengthen the Liberal Party and Canadian democracy.

==== Grassroot politics ====
In an interview with David Moscrop, Erskine-Smith was asked how to provide a deeper commitment to grassroots involvement than previous Liberal parties, and he cited relationship-building and being an advocate for serving the community. During the 2023 Ontario leadership race, Erskine-Smith published op-eds in the Toronto Star, National Post and Canada's National Observer, stating how he would renew the Ontario Liberals. In his National Post op-ed, Erskine-Smith stated that he would lead the party by allowing a diversity of perspectives, united by shared values, and by collaborating on community challenges. In his Toronto Star op-ed, Erskine-Smith stated that he would rebuild the party by shifting away from a centralized approach and committing to fair and open nominations, freer votes and collaboration with other parties. In his National Observer op-ed, Erskine-Smith stated that he planned to increase youth engagement in politics by being less partisan and encouraging young people to be involved in decision-making.

==== Electoral reform ====
Erskine-Smith was a member of Fair Vote, an electoral reform group, where he met with his predecessor to advocate for changes to the electoral system. Erskine-Smith campaigned on the idea during his nomination race in 2014 before it was added to the Liberal platform. In a 2016 CBC interview, he opposed Prime Minister Justin Trudeau's idea of a preferential ballot and countered with single-transferable voting as an option. After his party walked back its commitment to changing the electoral system, Erskine-Smith wrote an op-ed in the Huffington Post apologizing to those who believed that the electoral system would change. He stated that his party should have held a referendum as a compromise and that he would not stop advocating for electoral reform. In May 2017, Erskine-Smith, alongside fellow Liberal MP Sean Casey, voted against their own party in accepting a Commons committee report that outlined how electoral reform could be implemented.

During the 2023 Ontario Liberal leadership campaign, Erskine-Smith said that if he were going to address electoral reform, he would advocate for a citizens’ assembly in the vein of New Zealand.

=== Housing and infrastructure ===
In 2023, Erskine-Smith told Moscrop that the Ford government started by saying the right things about housing but mismanaged a consequential issue. He explained that housing factors into generational fairness and productivity. Erskine-Smith suggested removing barriers that hinder development, investing more in the development of public housing, and treating housing less as an investment vehicle. During the 2023 leadership race, he wrote an op-ed in the Trillium explaining how he would make housing more affordable. Erskine-Smith was critical of the Ford government for caving in to NIMBYs by keeping exclusionary zoning laws and reducing density targets while embracing sprawl. He also advocated for phased-in rent controls, an ownership registry, and taxes for investors who avoid increasing supply as ways to treat housing less as an investment.

After Erskine-Smith was appointed housing minister in 2024, he reiterated three things that he would do to tackle the Canadian housing crisis: remove restrictive policies that hinder development, get the government back into the development of public housing, and treat housing less as an investment vehicle. In 2026, he emphasized the importance of driving down the cost of building homes, bringing back provincial support for non-market housing, supporting renters, and connecting communities with public transit.

=== Education ===
In 2023, Erskine-Smith told Moscrop that defending public education is important to him. He viewed the public education system as overburdened and underfunded. Erskine-Smith felt that a previous budget by the Ford government was going to lead to cuts because spending was below inflation. In 2025, Erskine-Smith revealed that joining his parents when they picketed against cuts to the education budget made during Ontario Premier Mike Harris's tenure was what got him into politics.

In 2026, Erskine-Smith was critical of the Ford government's changes to the Ontario Student Assistance Program, believing that they would negatively affect lower-income families, and advocated fixing the program to ensure equality of opportunity in post-secondary education.

=== Environment ===
==== Animal welfare ====
In 2015, Erskine-Smith seconded Bill S-203, the Ending the Captivity of Whales and Dolphins Act, which became law in June 2019. The bill prohibits the captivity of cetaceans and requires permits to import and export them to and from Canada. Erskine-Smith spoke to the House about the importance of the bill in June 2018.

On February 26, 2016, Erskine-Smith introduced Bill C-246, the Modernizing Animal Protections Act, to ban the import of shark fins and make Canada's animal cruelty laws tougher. Due to concerns from animal-use lobbyists, the bill was defeated 198 to 84 at second reading. The defeat of Erskine-Smith's Bill C-246 led to the creation of the Liberal Animal Welfare Caucus in 2017. On September 5, 2017, Erskine-Smith wrote an article in NOW Magazine addressing his veganism and the importance of social change in the treatment of animals. Two years later, a government bill addressing similar concerns was tabled by Justice Minister Jody Wilson-Raybould. She acknowledged Erskine-Smith's efforts as a precursor to the government's legislation.

==== Climate action ====
In October 2018, Erskine-Smith called an emergency debate on climate change in Parliament in response to the Intergovernmental Panel on Climate Change's special report on global warming. He requested action by the government and Canadians to ensure that Canada could reduce its emissions and reach the targeted goals. On June 5, 2019, Erskine-Smith introduced Bill C-454, the Net-Zero Greenhouse Gas Emissions Act, to require the Government of Canada to reduce GHG emissions to net zero by 2050.

In 2023, Erskine-Smith told Moscrop that he viewed having a good climate plan as important to creating jobs and saw nuclear energy as part of Ontario's energy sources in order to tackle climate change. He also emphasized that efficiency as well as economics should be considered when electrifying the electric grid.

=== Healthcare ===
In February 2021, alongside fellow colleague Wayne Long, Erskine-Smith was one of only two Liberal MPs to vote in favour of a New Democratic Party (NDP) motion to take a first step towards developing a national pharmacare system. The bill, proposed by Peter Julian, would have established the conditions for federal financial contributions to provincial drug insurance plans. The following year, the Liberal Party would commit to working towards a "universal national pharmacare program" as part of its confidence and supply agreement with the NDP following the 2021 federal election.

In 2023, Erskine-Smith told Moscorp that he felt the Ford government was incompetently managing Ontario's health-care system through under-investment and inefficiencies. He argued that, while the Ontario government spent part of its budget on health care, it was spending less than the national average on nurses and believed that two million people in the province lacked access to a family doctor or a family health team. Erskine-Smith also viewed the discussion of the privatization of health care as a distraction from the issue.

=== Legal policies ===
==== Anti-corruption ====
During the SNC-Lavalin affair, Erskine-Smith, alongside Long, broke with their party and supported an opposition motion advocating that their government launch a public inquiry into the allegations. Erskine-Smith later told reporters that he wanted more information on Jody Wilson-Raybould's allegation about the “inappropriate” pressure she faced, pointing to contradictions that needed to be addressed between her testimony to the Commons justice committee and that of subsequent witnesses. He differed from his Liberal colleagues, who wanted Wilson-Raybould or Jane Philpott to use their legal privilege when testifying; instead, he advocated expanded waiver powers for them to testify about SNC-Lavalin.

==== Civil liberties ====
In June 2018, Erskine-Smith introduced Bill C-413, an Act to amend the Personal Information Protection and Electronic Documents Act, to give new powers to the federal privacy commissioner. In August 2019, Erskine-Smith wrote an op-ed for the Toronto Star expressing his desire for the right to be forgotten. He explained that, in an increasingly connected online world, citizens should have the right to hide content published about them from search engines if the individual’s privacy is being seriously violated.

In response to the occupation of downtown Ottawa by the Freedom Convoy, the government enacted the Emergencies Act. With Ottawa streets largely cleared of protesters by the time of the vote, Erskine-Smith's speech to Parliament condemned the protests but questioned the necessity of the declaration of emergency and its approval after the clearance. He ultimately voted to confirm the use of the declaration.

==== Drug policy reform ====
In February 2016, Erskine-Smith represented Canada at a joint United Nations/Inter-Parliamentary Union conference reviewing how different countries were dealing with illegal drugs. He partnered with Mexican Senator Laura Rojas to argue that countries should seek alternatives to incarceration in cases where individuals have drugs solely for personal use. In March 2019, Erskine-Smith wrote an op-ed for NOW Magazine in which he discussed his support for a bill introduced by New Democratic Party (NDP) MP Murray Rankin, stating that only expungements would address the injustice of cannabis criminalization. Erskine-Smith seconded the bill in the House of Commons.

In early January 2017, Erskine-Smith published an op-ed in Vice calling for the decriminalization of all drug possession as a logical next step in the government's drug policy. In late January 2017, Erskine-Smith delivered a speech in the House of Commons in support of Bill C-37, which would expand access to safe injection clinics across Canada. Erskine-Smith introduced Bill C-460, seeking to remove criminal sanctions for low-level possession and reduce the stigma associated with seeking treatment.

In 2018, Erskine-Smith appeared on CBC's Power & Politics to speak about his disappointment with the Liberal government endorsing a ‘War on Drugs’ document from the United States during CUSMA negotiations. Erskine-Smith introduced a Liberal caucus policy resolution to address the opioid crisis through a public health approach, and it was adopted as the second overall priority by the grassroots Liberal membership at the Liberal Policy Convention in Halifax in April 2018. He explained to the Guardian that framing drug use as a criminal issue has shifted the conversation about drugs away from health, helped fuel the black market and diverted resources from law enforcement. In 2020, Erskine-Smith introduced Bill C-235, which would delete the drug possession offence from the Criminal Code. He also introduced Bill C-236, which would provide diversion options to law enforcement, Crown attorneys, and judges for drug possession cases.

== Personal life ==
Erskine-Smith was raised vegetarian and is now vegan. He has Crohn's disease.

Erskine-Smith married Amelia (Amy) Symington, a Toronto vegan chef and nutritionist, on her family farm in Camlachie, Ontario. The two met in an undergraduate film studies course at Queen's University. They have two sons, born in 2016 and 2019.

== Recognition ==
For his efforts to modernize Canada's federal animal protection laws with Bill C-246, Erskine-Smith received the Humane Legislator Award from Animal Justice. The bill also won support from EndCruelty, a coalition of Canadians who support stronger animal protection laws. In 2017, Erskine-Smith received the Fur-Bearers’ Clements award for his dedication to improving the lives of animals with Bill C-246.

== Electoral record ==
2026 Toronto municipal election, Ward 19 Beaches—East York
Candidate	Votes	%
Nathaniel Erskine-Smith	21,472	46.75
Natalie Johnson	11,187	24.36
James Dann	5,461	11.89
Jennie Worden	3,723	8.11
Kevin Morrison	1,029	2.24
Adam Smith	899	1.96
Fatima Ibrahimi	511	1.11
Syeda Jaana Ali	466	1.01
Karsten Riedel	336	0.73
Mohammad Shabani	301	0.66
Devin Wilkins	213	0.46
Austin Vieira	205	0.45
Jeff Wahl	127	0.28
Total valid votes	45,930	100.00

2025 Canadian federal election: Beaches—East York
Party	Candidate	Votes	%	±%	Expenditures
Liberal	Nate Erskine-Smith	39,804	67.75	+11.17	$119,113.28
Conservative	Jocelyne Poirier	13,830	23.54	+9.19	$47,999.71
New Democratic	Shannon Devine	4,027	6.85	−15.67	$56,544.86
Green	Jack Pennings	748	1.27	−1.44	$0.00
Independent	Diane Joseph	161	0.27	N/A	$0.00
Communist	Elizabeth Rowley	146	0.25	−0.01	$0.00
Marxist–Leninist	Steve Rutchinski	39	0.07	−0.03	$0.00
Total valid votes/expense limit		58,755	99.47	+0.13	$128,551.93
Total rejected ballots		311	0.53	–0.13	
Turnout		59,066	71.94	+7.03	
Eligible voters		82,102			
Liberal hold		Swing		+0.99	
Source: Elections Canada

2021 Canadian federal election: Beaches—East York
Party	Candidate	Votes	%	±%	Expenditures
Liberal	Nate Erskine-Smith	28,919	56.58	-0.62	$84,476.95
New Democratic	Alejandra Ruiz Vargas	11,513	22.52	+1.16	$34,400.36
Conservative	Lisa Robinson*	7,336	14.35	+0.29	$20,930.77
People's	Radu Rautescu	1,613	3.16	+1.70	$0.00
Green	Reuben Anthony DeBoer	1,388	2.72	-3.20	$1,906.03
Independent	Karen Lee Wilde	166	0.32		$0.00
Communist	Jennifer Moxon	131	0.26		$0.00
Marxist–Leninist	Philip Fernandez	50	0.10		$0.00
Total valid votes/expense limit		51,116	99.34	–	$110,305.28
Total rejected ballots		340	0.66	+0.07	
Turnout		51,456	64.91	-5.25	
Eligible voters		79,273			
Liberal hold		Swing		-0.89	
Source: Elections Canada *After the ballots had been printed, but before the election day itself, Robinson was dropped by the party as the CPC candidate. She would not have been admitted to the Conservative caucus had she won.

2019 Canadian federal election: Beaches—East York
Party	Candidate	Votes	%	±%	Expenditures
Liberal	Nate Erskine-Smith	32,647	57.20	+7.75	$74,562.95
New Democratic	Mae J. Nam	12,196	21.37	-9.45	$91,821.20
Conservative	Nadirah Nazeer	8,026	14.06	-2.37	$ 73,545.89
Green	Sean Manners	3,378	5.92	+3.34	none listed
People's	Deborah McKenzie	831	1.46	-	$1,821.54
Total valid votes/expense limit		57,078	99.41		
Total rejected ballots		340	0.59	+0.20	
Turnout		57,418	70.16	-1.83	
Eligible voters		81,842			
Liberal hold		Swing		+8.60	
Source: Elections Canada

2015 Canadian federal election: Beaches—East York
Party	Candidate	Votes	%	±%	Expenditures
Liberal	Nate Erskine-Smith	27,458	49.45	+18.69	$104,089.50
New Democratic	Matthew Kellway	17,113	30.82	-10.82	$129,211.99
Conservative	Bill Burrows	9,124	16.43	-6.31	$35,453.04
Green	Randall Sach	1,433	2.58	-2.02	$3,691.94
Independent	James Sears	254	0.46	–	$35,400.00
Marxist–Leninist	Roger Carter	105	0.19	-0.08	–
Independent	Peter Surjanac	43	0.08	–	$449.62
Total valid votes/expense limit		55,530	99.61		$208,561.84
Total rejected ballots		216	0.39	-0.01	
Turnout		55,746	71.99	+5.33	
Eligible voters		77,440			
Liberal gain from New Democratic		Swing		+14.76	
Source: Elections Canada

Candidates for the November 13, 2006 Kingston, Ontario Sydenham District City Councillor Election
Candidate	Popular vote		
Candidate	Votes	%	±%
Bill Glover	1,180	46.24%	-
Floyd Patterson	912	35.74%	-
Nathaniel Erskine-Smith	297	11.64%	-
Alex Huntley	163	6.39%	-
Total votes	2,552		
