= Independent candidates in the 2004 Canadian federal election =

Several independent candidates campaigned as candidates in the 2004 federal election, representing a variety of political viewpoints and ambitions. One independent candidate, Chuck Cadman, was elected. Information about another candidates may be found on this page.

== Ontario ==
=== Rosie the Clown Elston (Kingston and the Islands) ===
Rosie the Clown is the stage name of Laura Elston. She was 46 years old at the time of the election, and had been performing as Rosie in Ottawa and Kingston for fifteen years. She campaigned in a red wig, jumpsuit and face paint, in a novelty candidacy influenced by groups like the defunct Rhinoceros Party of Canada. She announced her candidacy by saying, "I've just been thinking wouldn't it be nice to lighten up just a little bit. The issues are serious, and it's a very momentous time and a difficult time for the world, but I find that when we get too totally stressed out and we take ourselves too seriously, we don't decide well about the serious issues." (Kingston Whig-Standard, 7 June 2004)

Elston was an aide to local Progressive Conservative Member of Parliament (MP) Flora MacDonald for two years in the 1980s (KWS, 23 June 2004). She received 237 votes (0.44%), finishing sixth against Liberal incumbent Peter Milliken.

Elston should not be confused with Vicki Gabereau, who campaigned for Mayor of Toronto under the pseudonym of clown "Rosie Sunrise" in 1974 (Toronto Star, 23 January 2003).

=== Karl Eric Walker (Kingston and the Islands) ===
Walker received 100 votes (0.18%), finishing eighth against Liberal incumbent Peter Milliken.

=== Edward John Slota (Beaches—East York) ===
Slota (born September 28, 1947, died March 14, 2005) was Slota was born in Belgium to Polish parents. He worked in land development, construction, rental property management, securities, and machinery and robotics design and manufacturing. He died unexpectedly of a stroke on March 14, 2005, after a dinner being held to discuss his 2006 campaign. He won 85 votes, 0.2% of the total vote in the riding.

Slota ran as the leader and only candidate of the Global Party of Canada . It advocated wealth redistribution through monetary reform, and aimed to change the Canadian economic system and to lead worldwide change through the associated "Global Party of the World". The party was not registered with Elections Canada. The Global Party attempted to ally itself with the Green Party of Canada by encouraging voters to support Green candidates in other ridings.

The Global Party believed that a massive creation of new money by the Bank of Canada would free enterprise, create jobs and wealth, and prevent communism and dictatorship. The creation of new money would enable a Global Party government to pay every man, woman and child $1,500 to $3,000 per month for life, eliminate the need for taxes, and provide sufficient capital to increase spending for "common good" projects, such as schools, health and welfare, etc., by fifty percent. In addition to unleashing tremendous economic forces, this would eliminate the "hierarchy of money" and permit the "self-actualization" of all people.

The party's monetary reform proposals were similar to those of the theory of social credit expounded by previous Canadian political parties, including the Social Credit Party of Canada. The party appears to have ceased functioning after his death.
