= Lutfor Rahman Riton =

Bangladeshi writer

- লুৎফর রহমান রিটন
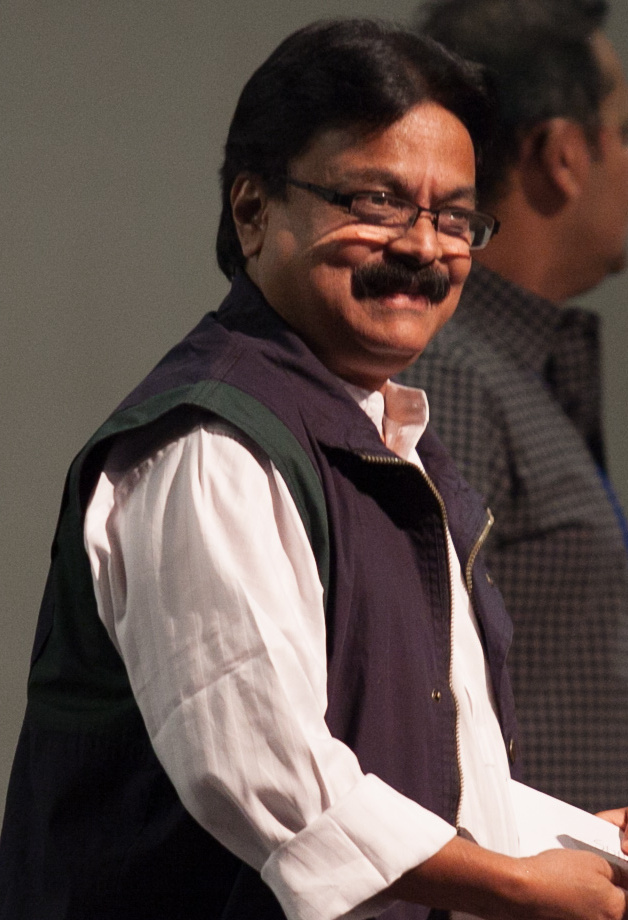
- Riton in 2016
- Born: 1 April 1961 (age 65); Dacca, East Bengal, Pakistan
- Education: Dhaka College; Dhaka University
- Occupations: Writer, rhymester and children's literature writer
- Known for: Bengali rhymes
- Spouse: Sharly Rahman
- Children: 1
- Awards: Bangla Academy Literary Award (2007); Ekushey Padak (2024)
- Website: Official website

Lutfor Rahman Riton is a Bangladeshi rhymester, a writer of young adult and children's literature. He earned the Bangla Academy Literary Award for his contribution to children's literature in 2007 and the Ekushey Padak in 2024.

== Early life and education ==
Riton attended Nawabpur Government High School, Dhaka College, and the University of Dhaka.

== Career ==
Riton's work was first published in the newspaper The Daily Ittefaq. He started writing for adults and young readers in the early 1980s. As a professional writer, he first took up the pen and wrote rhymes against rajakars in 1979. He published a book called "Rajakar er Chhora" in 1990, which was highly appreciated by readers. Thus far, Riton has more than a hundred books published. He has been honored with numerous awards for his work. He received the Bangla Academy Literary Award in 2007, which is considered to be the highest honor and recognition in Bengali literature. Sikandar Abu Zafar Award (1982), Agnari Bank Children's Literature Award (1982 & 1996), Dhaka University Award (1984), Dadabhai Children's Literature Award (1999), City-Ananda Alo Literature Award (2011), and Annadashankar Award (2011) are also some of the awards that he received for his contribution to Bengali literature. He also received the Television Artists and Writers Association award for writing drama series and screenplays for children.

One of Riton's unusual short stories for children, "Tokai Amin Tokai Beral" (Ragpicker Amin Ragpicker Pussy Cat), was translated into English from Bangla by the National Professor of Bangladesh, Kabir Chowdhury (b.1923). In his note, Professor Kabir Chowdhury wrote —"Riton in his work captures our socio-political milieu in a manner that is at once amusing and disturbing. It is replete with humorous anecdotes, satiric observations, tender situations as well as intriguing ones created by power-hungry crooked political leaders. Ragpicker Amin Ragpicker Pussy Cat is a tale told well, a realistic tale, although at places it is reminiscent of Lewis Carrol's inimitable fantasy Alice in wonderland. Riton's prose is smooth flowing, his plot well-constructed, his humour spontaneous and his satire free from malice and bitterness. Ragpicker Amin Ragpicker Pussy Cat does not belong to the traditional category of children's literature. It is an unusual work which, hopefully, both adults and youngsters will enjoy."

Riton played a major role as a planner and writer in the Meena Development Project (1997), which was part of the UNICEF campaign created for equal rights and education for children, specifically female children. Riton played a key role in this movement. UNICEF published an audio CD, cassette, and book about Meena "Amra Shobai Meenar Moto" that was written, scripted, and directed by Riton in 2000. He worked as the first secretary (press) at the Embassy of Bangladesh in Tokyo, Japan (2001-2002).

Riton is also a member of the Bangladesh Liberation Museum and a fellow of the Bangla Academy. He worked as a presenter and a host for many shows on Bangladesh Television (BTV). He was an elected council member of Bangla Academy (1999-2000). He started his career as a journalist and worked for various daily, weekly, bi-weekly and monthly magazines as a reporter, sub-editor, and executive editor. He was the editor and publisher of the monthly "Chhotoder Kagoj", which he created for children (1995-2001). He was also the founder editor of the monthly "Ashonno", published from Bissho Shahitto Kendro (World Literature Center), that was created for young adults. His first book for adults was published in 1984. In 1987 and 1989, two of his plays, "Jhontu-Pontu" and "Hoi-Choi" aired on Bangladesh Television (BTV).

One of Riton's most notable works is "Keu Keu Abiram Chupi Chupi", the title song of the television entertainment show Ittyadi.

== Personal life ==
Riton resides in Ottawa, Canada, with his, wife Sharly Rahman, and daughter Sabrina Sharmin Nody.

== Awards ==
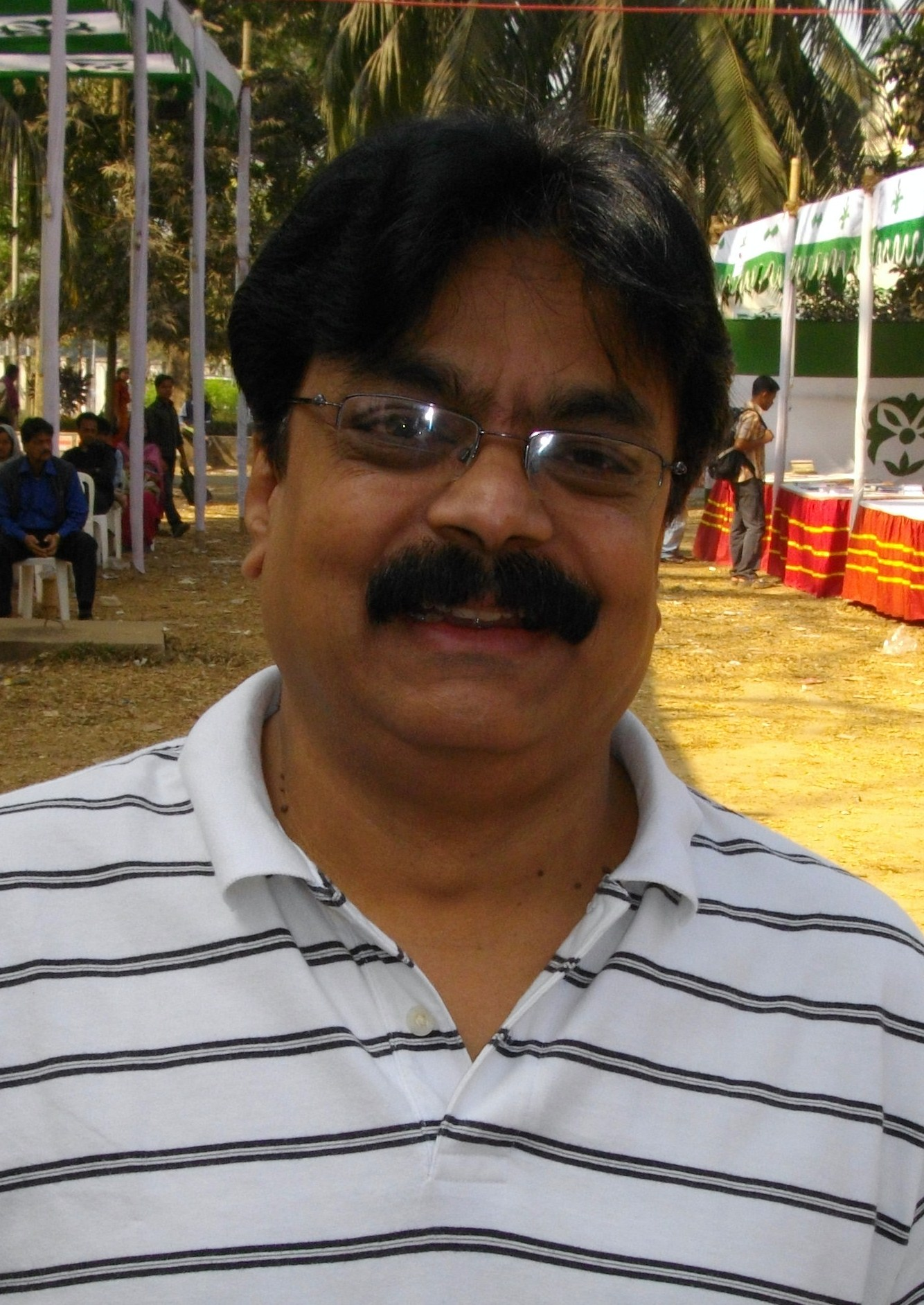
Riton in 2010

- Sikandar Abu Zafar Award (1982)
- Agrani Bank Children's Literature Award (1982 and 1996)
- Dhaka University Award (1984)
- Dadabhai Children's Literature Award (1999)
- Bangla Academy Literary Award (2007)
- City-Ananda Alo Literature Award (2011)
- Annada Shankar Ray Award (2011)
- Ekushey Padak (2024)
