= New Democratic Party leadership elections =

Canadian federal political party elections

New Democratic Party leadership elections, more commonly known as leadership conventions, are the process by which the Canadian New Democratic Party elects its leader.

Before 2003, when a modified one member, one vote (OMOV) system was adopted, every biennial New Democratic Party convention, since 1961, was a leadership convention. However, in practice, contested elections were held only when there was a declared leadership race. The earliest example of an incumbent leader being challenged from the convention floor happened in 1973 when Douglas Campbell unsuccessfully opposed David Lewis' leadership. In 2001, NDP Socialist Caucus member Marcel Hatch challenged Alexa McDonough from the floor of the convention; however, McDonough easily retained the leadership in the resulting vote.

When the NDP was created by the merger of the Co-operative Commonwealth Federation (CCF) and the Canadian Labour Congress (CLC), trade unions were allowed to directly affiliate to the party, and a system was unofficially arranged so that up to one-third of all delegates to NDP conventions were selected by labour and the other two-thirds by NDP riding associations. This was also the case at leadership conventions, giving the labour movement a significant say in determining the party's leadership. Under the current system, each biennial federal convention includes a vote at which the delegates decide whether a leadership convention should be held. Then-leader Thomas Mulcair lost such a vote at the 2016 convention, resulting in the 2017 leadership election being called.

In practice, all three CCF leaders had been chosen by their parliamentary caucus and then elected unanimously at a subsequent national convention.

== 1961 leadership convention results ==
Held in Ottawa, Ontario on August 3, 1961.

First Ballot
Candidate	Delegate Support	Percentage
Tommy Douglas	1,391	78.5%
Hazen Argue	380	21.5%
Total	1,771	100%

== 1971 leadership convention results ==
Held in Ottawa, Ontario on April 24, 1971.

Delegate Support by Ballot
Candidate	1st ballot		2nd ballot		3rd ballot		4th ballot	
Candidate	Votes cast	%	Votes cast	%	Votes cast	%	Votes cast	%
David Lewis	661	38.9%	715	42.5%	742	44.1%	1,046	63.1%
James Laxer	378	22.3%	407	24.1%	508	30.2%	612	36.9%
John Paul Harney	299	17.6%	347	20.5%	431	25.6%	Eliminated	
Ed Broadbent	236	13.9%	223	13.1%	Eliminated			
Frank Howard	124	7.3%	Eliminated					
Total	1,698	100.0%	1,692	100.0%	1,681	100.0%	1,658	100.0%

== 1973 leadership challenge results ==
Held in Vancouver, British Columbia on Friday, July 20, 1973.

First Ballot
Candidate	Delegate Support	Percentage
David Lewis	719	90.4%
Douglas Kay Campbell	76	9.6%
Total	795	100%

== 1975 leadership convention results ==
Held in Winnipeg, Manitoba on July 7, 1975.

Delegate Support by Ballot
Candidate	1st ballot		2nd ballot		3rd ballot		4th ballot	
Candidate	Votes cast	%	Votes cast	%	Votes cast	%	Votes cast	%
Ed Broadbent	536	33.1%	586	36.1%	694	43.4%	984	59.9%
Rosemary Brown	413	23.5%	397	24.5%	494	30.9%	658	40.1%
Lorne Nystrom	345	21.3%	342	21.1%	413	25.8%	Eliminated	
John Paul Harney	313	19.4%	299	18.4%	Eliminated			
Douglas Kay Campbell	11	0.6%	Eliminated					
Total	1,618	100.0%	1,624	100.0%	1,601	100.0%	1,642	100.0%

== 1989 leadership convention results ==
Held in Winnipeg, Manitoba on December 2, 1989.

Delegate Support by Ballot
Candidate	1st ballot		2nd ballot		3rd ballot		4th ballot	
Candidate	Votes cast	%	Votes cast	%	Votes cast	%	Votes cast	%
Audrey McLaughlin	646	26.9%	829	34.3%	1,072	44.4%	1,316	55.1%
Dave Barrett	566	23.6%	780	32.3%	947	39.3%	1,072	44.9%
Steven W. Langdon	351	14.6%	519	21.5%	393	16.3%	Eliminated	
Simon De Jong	315	13.1%	289	12.0%	Endorsed McLaughlin			
Howard McCurdy	256	10.7%	Withdrew					
Ian Waddell	213	8.9%	Withdrew					
Roger Lagassé	53	2.2%	Eliminated					
Total	2,400	100.0%	2,417	100.0%	2,412	100.0%	2,388	100.0%

== 1995 leadership convention results ==
Held in Ottawa, Ontario on October 14, 1995.

Support by Round
Candidate	Primaries	1st ballot	
Candidate	Primaries	Votes cast	%
Lorne Nystrom	44.69%	545	31.5%
Svend Robinson	32.06%	655	37.8%
Alexa McDonough	18.47%	566	32.6%
Herschel Hardin	12.8%	Did not endorse	
Total	100.0%	1,735	100.0%

The NDP held a series of regional and labour "caucus votes" prior to the national convention. A fourth candidate, Herschel Hardin, participated in the regional caucuses but did not win sufficient delegate support to qualify for the convention. These "primaries" were OMOV.

As the last place finisher on the first ballot, Nystrom was dropped. However, Robinson determined that he could not win on the second ballot if Nystrom's supporters moved to McDonough, as they were expected to, thus he withdrew and McDonough was declared the winner.

== 2001 leadership challenge results ==
Held in Winnipeg, Manitoba on Sunday, November 25, 2001.

Marcel Hatch, a leader of the NDP's Socialist Caucus, stood for leader as a challenge to Alexa McDonough's leadership.

First Ballot
Candidate	Delegate Support	Percentage
Alexa McDonough	645	84.31%
Marcel Hatch	120	15.69%
Total	765	100%

There were 42 spoiled ballots. If these are factored in McDonough's level of support was 78% overall.

== 2003 leadership election results ==
Held in Toronto, Ontario on January 25, 2003.

First Ballot
Candidate	Votes (Adjusted)	Percentage
Jack Layton	31,150	53.5%
Bill Blaikie	14,365	24.7%
Lorne Nystrom	5,397	9.3%
Joe Comartin	4,490	7.7%
Pierre Ducasse	2,155	3.7%
Bev Meslo	645	1.1%
Total	58,202	100%

For this election, the NDP instituted a modified one member one vote system. Votes by labour delegates accounted for 25% of the total result, while votes cast by party members accounted for 75%. The carve out for labour was eliminated prior to the 2012 election.

== 2012 leadership election ==
The leadership convention was held at the Metro Toronto Convention Centre on March 24, 2012. There were 128,351 eligible voters, most voting from home and not delegates at the convention.

The party chose Thomas Mulcair as their new leader following the death of Jack Layton on August 22, 2011. A One member, one vote process was used.

= Eliminated from next round
= Withdrew nomination
= Winner

Support by Ballot
Candidate	1st ballot		2nd ballot		3rd ballot		4th ballot	
Candidate	Votes cast	%	Votes cast	%	Votes cast	%	Votes cast	%
Tom Mulcair	19,728	30.3%	23,902	38.3%	27,488	43.8%	33,881	57.2%
Brian Topp	13,915	21.4%	15,624	25.0%	19,822	31.6%	25,329	42.8%
Nathan Cullen	10,671	16.4%	12,449	19.9%	15,426	24.6%	Did not endorse	
Peggy Nash	8,353	12.8%	10,519	16.8%	Did not endorse			
Paul Dewar	4,883	7.5%	Did not endorse					
Martin Singh	3,821	5.9%	Endorsed Mulcair					
Niki Ashton	3,737	5.7%	Did not endorse					
Roméo Saganash	Endorsed Mulcair							
Robert Chisholm	Endorsed Mulcair							
Total	65,108	100.0%	62,494	100.0%	62,736	100.0%	59,210	100.0%

== 2017 leadership election ==
Voting was held between September 18 to October 1, 2017. The results were announced on October 1 in Toronto, Ontario at the Westin Harbour Castle.

First Ballot
Candidate	Votes	Percentage
Jagmeet Singh	35,266	53.8%
Charlie Angus	12,705	19.4%
Niki Ashton	11,374	17.4%
Guy Caron	6,164	9.4%
Total	65,782	100%

- Spoiled ballots: 101
- Abstentions: 172
- Turnout: 52.8% (▲1.9pp)

== 2026 leadership election ==
Voting was held between March 9 and 28, 2026. The results were announced on March 29 in Winnipeg, Manitoba, at the RBC Convention Centre.

2026 New Democratic Party leadership election
Candidate	First ballot	
Candidate	Votes	%
Avi Lewis	39,734	56.02%
Heather McPherson	20,899	29.46%
Tanille Johnston	5,159	7.27%
Rob Ashton	4,193	5.91%
Tony McQuail	945	1.33%
Total valid votes	70,930	99.99%
Rejected ballots	4	0.01%
Turnout	70,934	70.55%
Eligible voters	100,542	
Source: New Democratic Party
