= Petryk =

Petryk is a surname. Notable people with the surname include:

- Anastasiya Petryk (Nastya Petryk) (born 2004), Ukrainian singer
- Anna Petryk, Ukrainian footballer
- Dan Petryk (born 1965), Canadian curler
- Hernán Petryk (born 1994), Uruguayan professional footballer
- Stephanie Petryk Potoski (1916–1993), Canadian physician, politician
- Steve Petryk (born 1963), Canadian curler, older brother of Dan Petryk
- Viktoria Petryk (Vika Petryk) (born 1997), Ukrainian singer
- Warren Petryk (born 1955), American politician
