= 1975 New Democratic Party leadership election =

Party election in Canada

- July 4–7, 1975
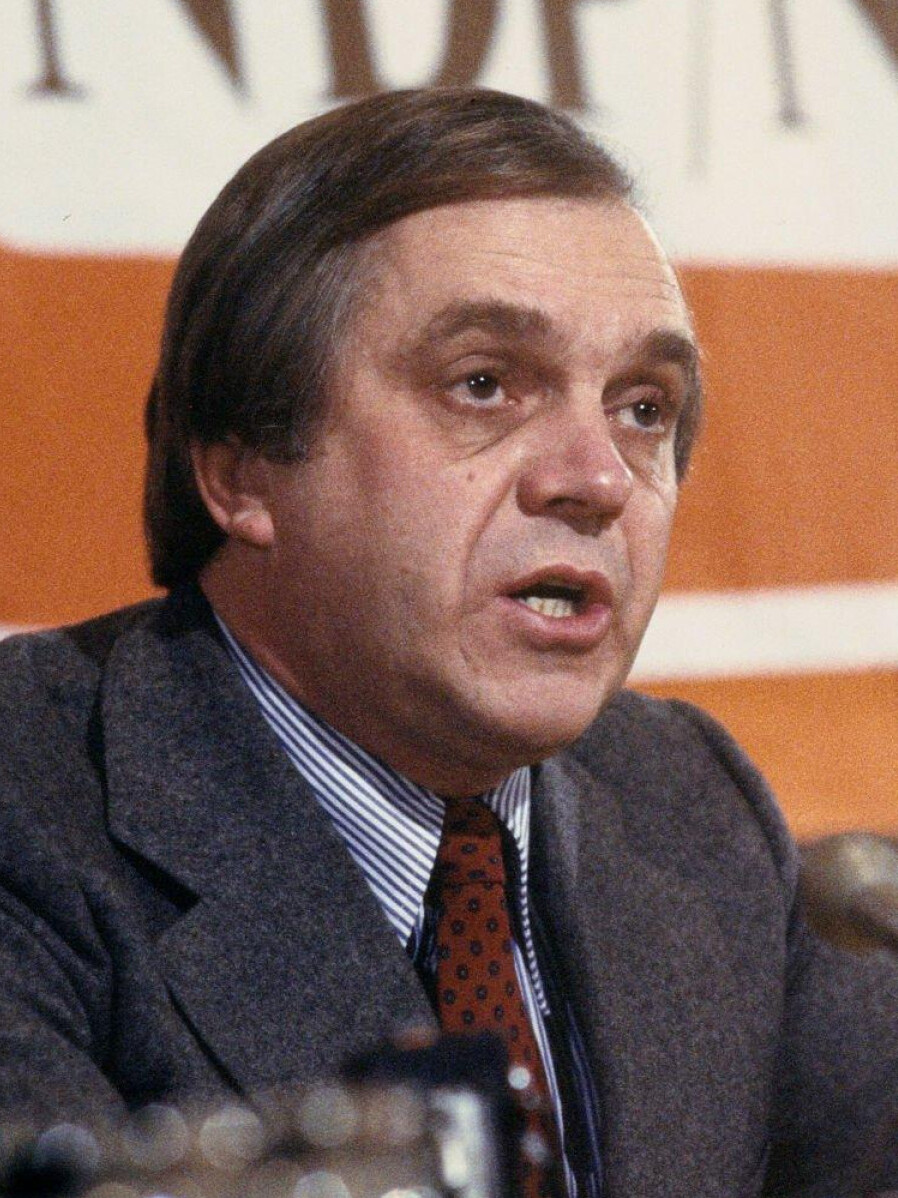

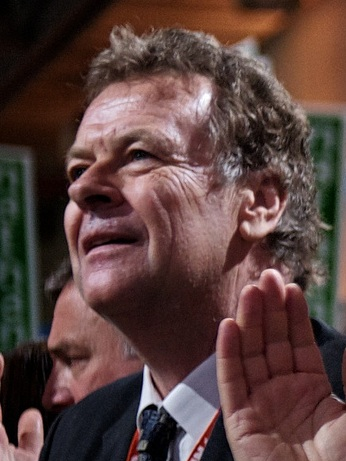

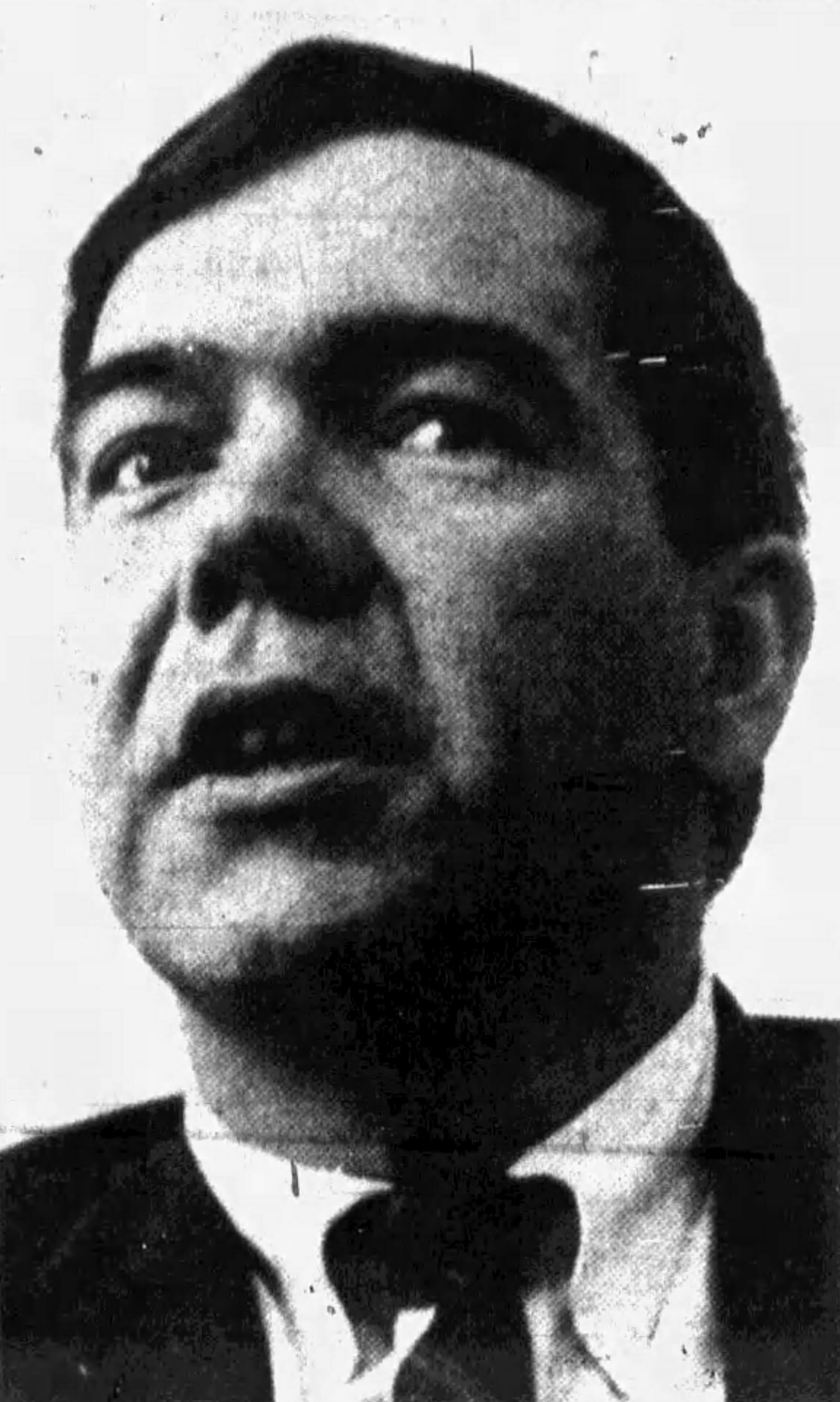
		RB
Candidate	Ed Broadbent	Rosemary Brown
Fourth ballot delegate count	984 (59.9%)	658 (40.1%)
Third ballot delegate count	694 (43.4%)	494 (30.9%)
Second ballot delegate count	586 (36.1%)	397 (24.5%)
First ballot delegate count	536 (33.1%)	413 (25.6%)
Candidate	Lorne Nystrom	John Paul Harney
Fourth ballot delegate count	Eliminated	Eliminated
Third ballot delegate count	413 (25.8%)	Eliminated
Second ballot delegate count	342 (21.1%)	299 (18.4%)
First ballot delegate count	345 (21.3%)	313 (19.3%)
Leader before election
David Lewis
Elected Leader
Ed Broadbent

1975 New Democratic Party leadership election
- Date: July 4 – 7, 1975
- Convention: Winnipeg, Manitoba
- Resigning leader: David Lewis
- Won by: Ed Broadbent
- Ballots: 4
- Candidates: 5

The New Democratic Party held a leadership election in Winnipeg, from July 4 to 7, 1975 to choose a new leader following the retirement of David Lewis, who had decided to step down from the role due to a combination of health problems and the party's poor showing at the previous year's federal election, which had seen the party suffer what at the time was its worst result since its foundation, as well as Lewis losing his own seat. Ed Broadbent was elected as his successor. Rosemary Brown made the first attempt by a woman of colour to run for leader of a major recognized Canadian political party and came in second. This convention marked the beginning of fourteen years of party unity and stability that allowed it to reach its best electoral performances of the 20th century.

== Candidates ==
- Ed Broadbent, 39, was MP for Oshawa—Whitby, and the party's interim parliamentary leader since Lewis lost his seat at the previous year's federal election. He had previously run for the party's leadership in 1971, when he had finished in fourth place, and was generally seen as the front-runner, enjoying the support of several prominent NDP politicians, chief among them being former party leader Tommy Douglas. Broadbent had initially ruled himself out, but changed his mind after an outpouring of support and assurances that he would be allowed time for his family life.
- Rosemary Brown, 45, was an MLA for the British Columbia provincial seat of Vancouver-Burrard. Though initially viewed as an outsider due to never having held a federal seat, this helped her avoid being associated with Lewis' crackdown on the Waffle (her being a backbench MLA also meant she avoided being too closely associated with the provincial NDP government of Dave Barrett, the unpopularity of which had been blamed in part for the federal party's poor showing at the previous year's election), meaning that the left of the party overwhelmingly supported her candidacy, to the point where as the convention approached she was considered by some to have a serious chance of defeating Broadbent for the party leadership.
- Douglas Campbell, 41, was a taxi driver, poet, and perennial candidate from Toronto, who had never held any form of elected office. He had nonetheless run twice for the leadership of the Ontario New Democratic Party, finishing last on both occasions, and also challenged Lewis for leadership of the federal NDP two years earlier, winning just 9.6% of the vote with the remaining 90.4% voting for Lewis. Lacking the funds to mount any sort of serious campaign, his leadership run was largely ignored by the media and the other candidates.
- John Paul Harney, 44, had been MP for Scarborough West between 1972 and 1974. Aside from Broadbent, he was the only other candidate from the 1971 race to be making a second run for the party leadership, as well as the only candidate to be fluently bilingual. The latter helped him earn support in Quebec, though he struggled to expand his base of support beyond that province.
- Lorne Nystrom, 29, was MP for Yorkton—Melville, and despite being almost a decade younger than Broadbent, had just as much parliamentary experience as him, both having been first elected as MPs in 1968. Though initially looked at more as a potential future leader than someone who had a serious chance of winning this time around, he attracted a stronger level of support than had been widely expected, causing him to be looked at as a potential dark horse in case of a close race between Broadbent and Brown.

=== Declined ===
- Dave Barrett, Premier of British Columbia (1972–1975)
- Allan Blakeney, Premier of Saskatchewan (1971–1982). Endorsed Broadbent.
- Eric Kierans, candidate in the 1968 Liberal leadership convention, federal cabinet minister (1968–1971), Quebec provincial cabinet minister (1963–1968). Kierans had endorsed the NDP in the 1972 election and advised Manitoba premier Edward Schreyer in the past. Manitoba cabinet minister Sidney Green attempted to draft him for the leadership, and his efforts were supported by Schreyer, Nova Scotia leader Jeremy Akerman, Canadian Union of Public Employees president Stan Little, Le Devoir publisher Claude Ryan and Montreal academic Charles Taylor. As Kierans had little connection to the NDP, and most of the people pushing his candidacy were considered outsiders, the draft attempt was met with anger in the party.
- Roy Romanow, Deputy Premier and Attorney General of Saskatchewan (1971–1982)
- Max Saltsman, MP for Waterloo South (1964–1979). Endorsed Broadbent.
- Edward Schreyer, Premier of Manitoba (1969–1977). However, he said he would accept a draft for the leadership.

== Leadership vote ==
It was generally treated as a foregone conclusion that Campbell would be eliminated first (which proved the case, with him failing to even earn a full percentage point of the vote), with the first round of voting being largely seen as an indicative vote. Broadbent held the lead, with a decent margin over the other three candidates, who were closely bracketed together. Though Brown had placed a solid second, most at the convention quickly concluded that a Broadbent victory was likely inevitable, as all he would have to do would be to win at least half of the delegates each from Harney and Nystrom, both of whom were ideologically closer to him than Brown.

The second round proved largely a repeat of the first, but critically, the only candidate who gained any votes was Broadbent, with the other three all losing delegates to varying degrees, and Harney being eliminated. His support split relatively evenly between the other three candidates, and with neither Brown nor Nystrom prepared to drop out and support the other to head off a Broadbent victory, the third round saw Nystrom eliminated. His delegates moved to Broadbent by a roughly 3:2 ratio, securing him victory.

Delegate support by ballot
Candidate	1st ballot		2nd ballot		3rd ballot		4th ballot	
Name	Votes cast	%	Votes cast	%	Votes cast	%	Votes cast	%
Ed Broadbent	536	33.1%	586	36.1%	694	43.4%	984	59.9%
Rosemary Brown	413	25.6%	397	24.5%	494	30.9%	658	40.1%
Lorne Nystrom	345	21.3%	342	21.1%	413	25.8%		
John Paul Harney	313	19.3%	299	18.4%				
Douglas Campbell	11	0.7%						
Total	1,618	100.0%	1,624	100.0%	1,601	100.0%	1,642	100.0%
