= Lorne Nystrom =

Canadian politician (born 1946)

The Honourable Lorne Nystrom PC
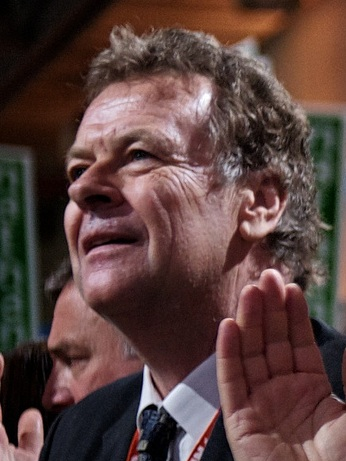

Member of Parliament for Regina—Qu'Appelle
- In office June 2, 1997 – June 27, 2004
- Preceded by: Simon De Jong
- Succeeded by: Andrew Scheer

Member of Parliament for Yorkton—Melville
- In office June 25, 1968 – October 24, 1993
- Preceded by: District created
- Succeeded by: Garry Breitkreuz

Personal details
- Born: Lorne Edmund Nystrom; April 26, 1946 (age 79) Wynyard, Saskatchewan, Canada
- Party: New Democratic

Lorne Edmund Nystrom PC (born April 26, 1946) is a Canadian politician and was a member of the House of Commons of Canada from 1968 to 1993 and again from 1997 to 2004. He is a member of the New Democratic Party.

== Parliamentary career ==
Nystrom was first elected for Yorkton—Melville in 1968. At the age of 22 years and three months, he was the youngest MP in Canadian history, a record he held until Claude-André Lachance was elected at the age of 20 in 1974. He was reelected without serious difficulty until losing to Reform challenger Garry Breitkreuz in 1993.

In 1992, he was appointed to the Queen's Privy Council for Canada.

He returned to Parliament in 1997 in the riding of Qu'Appelle, succeeding fellow New Democrat Simon De Jong. Nystrom faced a strong challenge for re-election in the riding, renamed Regina—Qu'Appelle in 2000, after the Progressive Conservatives unexpectedly failed to nominate a candidate. However, Nystrom managed to eke out a narrow victory over Canadian Alliance challenger Don Leier.

In 2004, Nystrom lost to the Conservative candidate, future House Speaker and Leader of the Official Opposition Andrew Scheer. Scheer won by a margin of 861 votes. The NDP renominated Nystrom to challenge Scheer at the next federal election in 2005; in the 2006 election, he lost again, this time by a larger margin of 2,712 votes.

Nystrom ran for the leadership of the federal NDP three times, placing third in each. In 1975, he finished behind winner Ed Broadbent and runner-up Rosemary Brown. Twenty years later, in 1995, Nystrom ran again but placed behind Svend Robinson and winner Alexa McDonough. His final attempt to win the party's leadership was in the 2003 election that ultimately selected Jack Layton; Nystrom finished in third behind Layton and Bill Blaikie.

== Career outside Parliament ==
Nystrom edited a book on practical progressive economics, Just Making Change: The 100 Percent, Honest to Goodness Truth About our User Unfriendly Financial System and How to Escape It, published in hardcover in 1999 and paperback in 2000.

Nystrom is a former board member of the Centre for Israel and Jewish Affairs (CIJA). Nystrom has also been involved with Brightenview Development International Inc. as the VP of Government Relations and CEO of Brightenvantage International Business Consulting Inc., a subsidiary of Brightenview.

== Electoral record ==
2004 Canadian federal election: Regina—Qu'Appelle
Party	Candidate	Votes	%	±%	Expenditures
Conservative	Andrew Scheer	10,012	35.8	-5.0	$68,776
New Democratic	Lorne Nystrom	9,151	32.7	-8.6	$46,290
Liberal	Allyce Herle	7,793	27.8	+9.9	$54,913
Green	Deanna Robilliard	639	2.3	–	
Christian Heritage	Mary Sylvia Nelson	293	1.0	–	$4,213
Independent	Lorne Edward Widger	106	0.4	–	$728
Total valid votes		27,994	100.0		–
Total rejected ballots		89	0.3	-0.2	
Turnout		28,083	56.2	-4.9	
Conservative gain from New Democratic		Swing		+1.80	

Note: Conservative vote is compared to the Canadian Alliance vote in 2000 election.

2000 Canadian federal election: Regina—Qu'Appelle
Party	Candidate	Votes	%	±%	Expenditures
New Democratic	Lorne Nystrom	11,731	41.3	-1.1	$57,492
Alliance	Don Leier	11,567	40.7	+13.8	$34,106
Liberal	Melvin Isnana	5,106	18.0	-5.8	$41,445
Total valid votes		28,404	100.0		–
Total rejected ballots		141	0.5	-0.1	
Turnout		28,545	61.1	-1.7	
New Democratic hold		Swing		-7.45	

Note: Canadian Alliance vote is compared to the Reform vote in 1997 election.

1997 Canadian federal election: Qu'Appelle
Party	Candidate	Votes	%	±%	Expenditures
New Democratic	Lorne Nystrom	12,269	42.4	+7.9	$59,376
Reform	Les Winter	7,784	26.9	+4.4	$55,562
Liberal	Don Ross	6,868	23.7	-7.4	$37,643
Progressive Conservative	Roy Gaebel	1,633	5.6	-4.4	$13,911
Canadian Action	Greg Chatterson	382	1.3	–	
Total valid votes		28,936	100.0		–
Total rejected ballots		143	0.6	+0.1	
Turnout		29,079	62.8		

1993 Canadian federal election: Yorkton—Melville
Party	Candidate	Votes	%	±%
Reform	Garry Breitkreuz	10,605	32.7	-1.9
Liberal	Jim Walters	9,531	29.4	+15.8
New Democratic	Lorne Nystrom*	9,487	29.2	-21.9
Progressive Conservative	Bob Reitenbach	2,825	8.7	-25.9
Total valid votes		32,448	100.0	
Reform gain from New Democratic		Swing		-8.85

* Denotes incumbent.

1988 Canadian federal election: Yorkton—Melville
Party	Candidate	Votes	%	±%
New Democratic	Lorne Nystrom*	18,523	51.1	-0.2
Progressive Conservative	Virginia Battiste	12,543	34.6	+1.2
Liberal	J. Robert Autumn	5,149	14.2	+0.1
Total valid votes		36,215	100.0	

1984 Canadian federal election: Yorkton—Melville
Party	Candidate	Votes	%	±%
New Democratic	Lorne Nystrom*	18,116	51.3	+5.6
Progressive Conservative	Ken Wasylysen	11,800	33.4	-3.9
Liberal	Arliss Dellow	4,996	14.1	-2.8
Confederation of Regions	Bill Kruczko	400	1.1	–
Total valid votes		35,312	100.0	

1980 Canadian federal election: Yorkton—Melville
Party	Candidate	Votes	%	±%
New Democratic	Lorne Nystrom*	15,240	45.7	-1.8
Progressive Conservative	Ben Hudye	12,450	37.3	+4.9
Liberal	Gordon Hollinger	5,664	17.0	+1.3
Total valid votes		33,354	100.0	
lop.parl.ca

1979 Canadian federal election: Yorkton—Melville
Party	Candidate	Votes	%	±%
New Democratic	Lorne Nystrom	16,677	47.5	+1.9
Progressive Conservative	John Miller	11,381	32.4	+10.7
Liberal	Phil Kotyk	5,501	15.7	-15.4
Independent	Ben Hudye	1,566	4.5	–
Total valid votes		35,125	100.0	

1974 Canadian federal election: Yorkton—Melville
Party	Candidate	Votes	%	±%
New Democratic	Lorne Nystrom	14,586	45.6	-2.1
Liberal	Stan Kyba	9,946	31.1	+2.5
Progressive Conservative	Marvin Wentzell	6,963	21.8	-0.7
Social Credit	Harry Hoedel	338	1.1	-0.2
Communist	George Shlakoff	179	0.6	–
Total valid votes		32,012	100.0	

1972 Canadian federal election: Yorkton—Melville
Party	Candidate	Votes	%	±%
New Democratic	Lorne Nystrom	15,998	47.7	+8.8
Liberal	Stephanie Potoski	9,574	28.5	-1.1
Progressive Conservative	Don Armour	7,542	22.5	-9.0
Social Credit	Harry Hoedel	425	1.3	–
Total valid votes		33,539	100.0	

1968 Canadian federal election: Yorkton—Melville
Party	Candidate	Votes	%
New Democratic	Lorne Nystrom	13,212	38.9
Progressive Conservative	James N. Ormiston	10,699	31.5
Liberal	Peter J. Konkin	10,068	29.6
Total valid votes		33,979	100.0
