= List of perennial candidates in Canada =

List of political candidates who frequently run for office unsuccessfully

A perennial candidate is a political candidate who frequently runs for public office without a reasonable chance of winning. While there is no generally accepted "number" of times a candidate must run before being considered "perennial", contemporary sources note that two or three failed candidacies, followed by another attempt, qualifies a candidate as perennial.

In Canada, perennial candidates may run with the support of small or fringe political parties, may attempt to become involved with mainstream parties without the backing of that party's membership and/or leadership executive, or may run municipally, where the influence of political parties is diminished.

There are few residency requirements for elected office in Canada. Candidates may run federally in any electoral district as long as they are a Canadian citizen over the age of 18 who is not disqualified based on profession (federal judges, provincial and territorial elected representatives, the Chief Electoral Officer, or Governor General), status as an incarcerated person, or after failing to submit a campaign financial return after a previous campaign. There is no requirement for a candidate to reside in the electoral district where they seek election. Provincial and municipal elections rules generally require a candidate reside within the jurisdiction broadly, but do not require a candidate to reside in the direct electoral district in which they seek elected office.

These lax rules allow perennial candidates to seek elected office across Canada. John Turmel, the Canadian perennial candidate who, according to Guinness World Records holds the records for the most elections contested and for the most elections lost, has sought the offices of Mayor, Member of Provincial Parliament, and Member of Parliament in 71 different jurisdictions across Ontario, Quebec, and Nova Scotia, since 1979.

== List of perennial candidates in Canada ==
Candidate	Primary place of residence		Notable Partisan Affiliation	Municipal campaigns	Provincial campaigns	Federal campaigns	Incomplete campaigns (Note: Incomplete campaigns include those campaigns where a candidate declares their intent, attempts to file, and/or begins a campaign, but is unable to continue in the campaign, does not appear on the final ballot, or the election is voided for any reason.)	Total	
Candidate	Municipality	Province	Notable Partisan Affiliation	Municipal campaigns	Provincial campaigns	Federal campaigns	Incomplete campaigns	Total complete campaigns	Overall total
Enza "Supermodel" Anderson	Toronto	Ontario	Canadian Alliance	3	-	-	1	3	4
Donald Clarke Andrews	Toronto	Ontario	Nationalist Party of Canada	10	-	-	-	10	10
Michael Baldasaro	Hamilton	Ontario	Marijuana Party of Canada	9	1	5	2	15	17
Harry Bradley	Toronto	Ontario	Independent	27	-	-	-	27	27
José Breton	Quebec City	Quebec	Independent	-	5	-	-	5	5
David W. Bylsma	West Lincoln	Ontario	Christian Heritage	2	0	7	-	9	9
Douglas Campbell	Toronto	Ontario	Ontario New Democratic Party	6	2	2	-	10	10
Kevin Clarke	Toronto	Ontario	The Peoples Political Party	11	10	6	-	27	27
Ross Dowson	Toronto	Ontario	League for Socialist Action	9	-	2	-	11	11
Donovan Eckstrom	Grande Prairie	Alberta	Rhinoceros Party	-	-	10	1	10	11
Jim Enos	Hamilton	Ontario	Christian Heritage	1	4	4	-	9	9
Paul Fromm	Hamilton	Ontario	Canadians' Choice Party	8	2	2	-	12	12
Henri-Georges Grenier	Montreal	Quebec	various	-	-	13	-	13	13
Larry Heather	Calgary	Alberta	Christian Heritage	7	8	14	-	29	29
Ben Kerr	Toronto	Ontario	Independent	7	-	-	-	7	7
Yaqoob Khan	Toronto	Ontario	Independent	7	-	1	-	8	8
Simonne Lizotte	Nicolet	Quebec	Independent	4	2	-	-	6	6
Anne C. McBride	Toronto	Ontario	Independent	5	-	9	-	14	14
Patricia Métivier	Montreal	Quebec	various	7	5	8	1	24	25
Régent Millette	Laval	Quebec	Parti démocratie chrétienne	4	15	7	1	26	27
David Popescu	Sudbury	Ontario	Independent	7	7	6	-	20	20
Naomi Rankin	Edmonton	Alberta	Communist	-	9	10	-	19	19
Bob Smith	Toronto	Ontario	Nationalist Party of Canada	8	1	1	-	10	10
John Turmel	Brantford	Ontario	Pauper	14	49	45	1	108	109
Alex Tyrrell	Montreal	Quebec	Parti Vert	-	10	-	1	10	11
Don Woodstock	Winnipeg	Manitoba	Liberal	2	3	1		6	6
Nathalie Xian Yi Yan	Hamilton	Ontario	Independent	4	2	2	2	8	10

== Perennial candidates by region ==
=== Quebec ===
==== Alex Tyrrell ====
Level	Election	Office	Party	Votes	Percent	Place	Result	Notes
Provincial	2012	Member of the National Assembly for Jacques-Cartier	Green Party of Quebec	1,522	4.54%	3/8	Not elected	
Provincial	2013 By-election	Member of the National Assembly for Outremont	Green Party of Quebec	384	3.79%	4/7	Not elected	
Provincial	2014	Member of the National Assembly for Notre-Dame-de-Grâce	Green Party of Quebec	1,318	4.52%	5/6	Not elected	
Provincial	2016 By-election	Member of the National Assembly for Chicoutimi	Green Party of Quebec	465	2.46%	5/6	Not elected	
Provincial	May 2017 By-election	Member of the National Assembly for Gouin	Green Party of Quebec	651	4.57%	5/13	Not elected	
Provincial	October 2017 By-election	Member of the National Assembly for Louis-Hébert	Green Party of Quebec	487	2.06%	6/10	Not elected	
Provincial	2018	Member of the National Assembly for Verdun	Green Party of Quebec	1,157	3.72%	5/10	Not elected	
Provincial	2018 By-election	Member of the National Assembly for Roberval	Green Party of Quebec	80	0.52%	7/7	Not elected	
Provincial	2022 By-election	Member of the National Assembly for Marie-Victorin	Green Party of Quebec	142	0.87%	7/12	Not elected	
Federal leadership	2022	Leader of the Green Party of Canada	Green Party of Canada	-	-	-	Expelled from party during leadership bid	
Provincial	2022	Member of the National Assembly for Notre-Dame-de-Grâce	Green Party of Quebec	956	3.73%	7/9	Not elected	

=== Ontario ===
==== Enza "Supermodel" Anderson ====
Level	Election	Office	Party	Votes	Percent	Place	Result	Notes
Municipal	2000	Toronto Mayor	Non-partisan municipal	13,595	2.25%	3/26	Not elected	
Federal Leadership	2002	Leader, Canadian Alliance	Canadian Alliance	n/a	n/a	n/a	Withdrew candidacy	
Municipal	2003	Toronto City Councillor, Ward 27 – Toronto Centre	Non-partisan municipal	3,058	15.3%	2/6	Not elected	
Municipal	2010	Toronto City Councillor, Ward 27 – Toronto Centre	Non-partisan municipal	1,127	4.23%	7/15	Not elected	

==== Don Andrews ====
Donald Clarke Andrews (born Vilim Zlomislić) was the leader of the Nationalist Party of Canada, a white-supremacist unregistered political party active from the 1970s to the early 2000s. Andrews best result came in 1976, when he earned 5.3% of the vote for mayor of Toronto in a race against popular incumbent David Crombie. Andrews would often only contest those elections where he would be placed at the top of the ballot by virtue of his last name's alphabetical importance.

Level	Election	Office	Party	Votes	Percent	Place	Result	Notes
Municipal	1972	Toronto Mayor	Non-partisan municipal	1,960	1.02%	5/7	Not elected	
Municipal	1974	Toronto Mayor	Non-partisan municipal	5,662	4%	2/11	Not elected	
Municipal	1976	Toronto Mayor	Non-partisan municipal	7,126	5.3%	2/10	Not elected	
Municipal	1988	Toronto Mayor	Non-partisan municipal	5,690	4%	4/9	Not elected	
Municipal	1991	Toronto Mayor	Non-partisan municipal	1,968	1.01%	4/9	Not elected	
Municipal	1994	Toronto Mayor	Non-partisan municipal	2,839	1.74%	5/11	Not elected	
Municipal	1997	Toronto Mayor	Non-partisan municipal	1,985	0.26%	5/11	Not elected	
Municipal	2003	Toronto Mayor	Non-partisan municipal	1,220	0.18%	10/44	Not elected	
Municipal	2010	Toronto Mayor	Non-partisan municipal	1,032	0.13%	19/40	Not elected	
Municipal	2014	Toronto Mayor	Non-partisan municipal	1,012	0.1%	7/65	Not elected	

==== Michael Baldasaro ====
Level	Election	Office	Party	Votes	Percent	Place	Result	Notes
Federal	1984	Member of Parliament, Hamilton West	Libertarian	300	0.73%	4/6	Not elected	
Municipal	1988	Hamilton Mayor	Non-partisan municipal	7,528	9.12%	2/2	Not elected	
Municipal	1991	Hamilton Mayor	Non-partisan municipal	2,507	2.8%	4/4	Not elected	
Municipal	1994	Hamilton Mayor	Non-partisan municipal	3,521	4.4%	3/5	Not elected	
Federal Leadership	1998	Leader, Progressive Conservative Party	Progressive Conservative Party	n/a	n/a	n/a	Failed to meet requirements	
Federal Leadership	2000	Leader, Canadian Alliance	Canadian Alliance	n/a	n/a	n/a	Failed to meet requirements	
Municipal	2000	Hamilton Mayor	Non-partisan municipal	1,637	1.1%	5/12	Not elected	
Federal	2000	Member of Parliament, Hamilton East	Marijuana Party	573	1.83%	5/9	Not elected	
Municipal	2003	Hamilton Mayor	Non-partisan municipal	2,569	1.85%	6/7	Not elected	
Federal	2004	Member of Parliament, Hamilton Centre	Independent	345	.8%	6/7	Not elected	
Municipal	2004 By-election	Hamilton City Councillor, Ward 2 – Downtown	Non-partisan municipal	52	1.03%	7/11	Not elected	
Municipal	2006	Hamilton Mayor	Non-partisan municipal	4,520	3.61%	4/7	Not elected	
Municipal	2010	Hamilton Mayor	Non-partisan municipal	2,892	2.1%	4/15	Not elected	
Federal	2011	Member of Parliament, Hamilton Centre	Marijuana Party	780	1.9%	4/5	Not elected	
Provincial	2011	Member of Provincial Parliament, Hamilton Centre	Independent	268	.8%	6/10	Not elected	
Municipal	2014	Hamilton Mayor	Non-partisan municipal	3,518	2.9%	4/12	Not elected	
Federal	2015	Member of Parliament, Hamilton Centre	Marijuana Party	348	0.85%	5/7	Not elected	

==== Dorian Baxter ====
Dorian Baxter is a Christian religious minister and musician, operating out of an independent church he runs in Newmarket, Ontario. Baxter is also a local Elvis impersonator, whose music he incorporates into his services. Since 2004, he has run multiple campaigns at the federal, provincial, and municipal level, all of which were for political offices representing areas of York Region.

==== Douglas Campbell ====
Douglas Campbell was a teacher and writer from Toronto, Ontario. In 1962, Campbell ran an independent campaign for Parliament in the electoral district of St Paul's, running against future Governor General Roland Michener. Campbell launched three NDP leadership campaigns in the 1970s; he twice sought the position of Ontario NDP leader in the 1970 leadership election and also 1972 when he challenged incumbent Stephen Lewis. He also challenged David Lewis for the federal NDP leadership in 1973 and ran to replace Lewis in the 1975 New Democratic Party leadership election.

In 1988, Campbell ran against North York's incumbent mayor, Mel Lastman. A profile in the Toronto Star listed Campbell's age as 59 and residence as Gulliver Road in Toronto, as well as referencing a past campaign for the office of Mayor of Mississauga. He told the Star his campaign was an attempt to find a larger platform so he could campaign on issues such as "sanctions against South Africa, free trade and the Meech Lake Accord."

During Campbell's campaign for mayor of Toronto in 2003, he generated media attention when he invited the audience at an all-candidates meeting to his wife's memorial service. Campbell, whose age was listed as 72 during the Toronto mayoral campaign in 2006, was attacked in a National Post editorial for a statement all-candidates meeting where the candidate said voting for a capitalist mayor was like "voting to kill your fellow workers," and comparing Stephen Harper, Paul Martin, and Franklin D. Roosevelt to Adolf Hitler. He was quoted in Now Magazine as also saying "If you vote for a capitalist candidate, you're voting to kill children."

Level	Election	Office	Party	Votes	Percent	Place	Result	Notes
Federal	1962	Member of Parliament, St. Paul's	Independent	328	1.2%	5/5	Not elected	
Provincial	1970	Leader of the Ontario New Democratic Party	Ontario New Democratic Party	21	1.1%	3/3	Not elected	
Provincial	1972	Leader of the Ontario New Democratic Party	Ontario New Democratic Party	124	14.1%	2/2	Not elected	
Federal	1973	Leader of the New Democratic Party	New Democratic Party	76	9.6%	2/2	Not elected	
Municipal	1973	Mississauga Mayor	Non-partisan municipal				Not elected	
Federal	1975	Leader of the New Democratic Party	New Democratic Party	11	0.7%	5/5	Not elected	
Municipal	1988	North York Mayor	Non-partisan municipal	10,290	8.26%	3/4	Not elected	
Municipal	2000	Toronto Mayor	Non-partisan municipal	8,591	1.42%	4/26	Not elected	
Municipal	2003	Toronto Mayor	Non-partisan municipal	2,197	0.32%	6/44	Not elected	
Municipal	2006	Toronto Mayor	Non-partisan municipal	4,183	0.72%	6/38	Not elected	
Municipal	2010	Toronto Mayor	Non-partisan municipal	1,428	0.18%	13/40	Not elected	

==== Bob Smith ====
Bob Smith (born Robert Wayne Smith) ran for federal, provincial, and municipal office 10 times from 1972 to 2006. His best result came in 1980 when he earned 1,319 votes in a race for school trustee in Toronto's Ward 8.

Level	Election	Office	Party	Votes	Percent	Place	Result	Notes
Municipal	1972	Toronto Board of Education Trustee, Ward 8 - Riverdale	Non-partisan municipal	247		11/11	Not elected	
Municipal	1974	Toronto City Councillor, Ward 4 - Trinity-Bellwoods and Little Italy	Non-partisan municipal	200		7/7	Not elected	
Municipal	1976	Toronto Board of Education Trustee, Ward 9 - The Beaches	Non-partisan municipal	864		6/7	Not elected	
Federal	1980	Member of Parliament, St. Paul's	Nationalist Party (Note: While Smith had the backing of the Nationalist Party, he was listed as "Independent" on the ballot, as the party did not have official status.)	108	0.3%	6/9	Not elected	
Municipal	1980	Toronto Board of Education Trustee, Ward 8 - Riverdale	Non-partisan municipal	1,319		6/9	Not elected	
Municipal	1982	Toronto Board of Education Trustee, Ward 8 - Riverdale	Non-partisan municipal	603		6/10	Not elected	
Municipal	1985	Toronto Board of Education Trustee, Ward 8 - Riverdale	Non-partisan municipal	935		5/7	Not elected	
Provincial	1993 By-election	Member of Provincial Parliament, St. George—St. David		72		8/9	Not elected	
Municipal	2003	Toronto City Councillor, Ward 31 - The Beaches	Non-partisan municipal	414	2.5%	4/4	Not elected	
Municipal	2006	Toronto Mayor	Non-partisan municipal	1,105	0.19%	20/38	Not elected	
