= Ontario CCF/NDP leadership elections =

Historical Canadian provincial political party leadership election results

The Ontario New Democratic Party elects its leaders by secret ballot of the party members and/or their delegates at leadership elections, as did its predecessor, the Co-operative Commonwealth Federation (Ontario Section). The party leader can be challenged for the leadership at the party's biennial convention. The Ontario New Democratic Party is a social democratic political party in Ontario, Canada.

From 1934 until 1942, the president of the Ontario CCF acted as the party's spokesperson and leader during election campaigns. John Mitchell, a Hamilton alderman, was CCF president from 1934 until 1941. Samuel Lawrence, former Ontario CCF MPP for Hamilton East was elected party president in 1941 and recommended that the party elect a leader in 1942.

== Ontario Co-operative Commonwealth Federation ==
=== 1942 leadership convention ===
(Held on April 3, 1942, at the Hotel Carls-Rite in Toronto)

Candidate	Votes	Percentage
Ted Jolliffe	majority	> 50
Murray Cotterill	n/a	n/a
Total	~ 150	100

Fifteen other individuals were nominated but declined to stand including Ontario CCF President and former Hamilton East MPP Samuel Lawrence; Allan Schroeder of St. Catharines; York West Member of Parliament Joseph W. Noseworthy; Canadian United Steelworkers of America executive director Charles Millard, lawyer Andrew Brewin; former Member of Parliament Agnes MacPhail; Toronto alderman William Dennison, CCF National Secretary David Lewis; University of Toronto professor and Toronto school trustee George Grube; teacher Everett Orlan Hall of London, Ontario; Alderman and former party president John Mitchell of Hamilton; B.E. Leavens of Toronto; Lou Isaacs; William Grant of Peterborough, and Margaret Sedgewick of Toronto.

(Note: The vote totals were not announced. 150 delegates participated in total.)

=== 1946 leadership challenge ===
(Held on November 23, 1946 at the Royal Connaught Hotel in Hamilton, Ontario)

Candidate	Votes	Percentage
Ted Jolliffe	majority	> 50
Lewis Duncan	n/a	n/a

=== 1953 leadership convention ===
(Held on November 21, 1953 at the Royal Canadian Legion Hall on College Street, in Toronto.)

= Eliminated from next round
= Winner

Delegate support by ballot
Candidate	1st Ballot		2nd Ballot		
Name	Votes	%	Votes	%	+/− (pp)
Donald C. MacDonald	127	35.7	181	50.8	+15.1
Fred Young	154	43.3	175	49.2	+5.9
Andrew Brewin	75	21.1	Eliminated		
Total	356	100.0	356	100.0	0

Former MPPs Agnes Macphail, Eamon Park, Charles Millard, and William Dennison were nominated as was sitting MPP and CCF house leader Bill Grummett but all declined.

(Note: These totals are taken from an interview with Donald C. MacDonald several years after the convention. They do not appear to have been announced at the convention itself.)

== Ontario New Democratic Party ==
=== 1961 leadership convention ===
(Held on October 8, 1961, at the Sheraton-Brock Hotel in Niagara Falls, Ontario)

Candidate	Votes
Donald C. MacDonald	acclaimed

=== 1968 leadership challenge ===
(Held on November 17, 1968, at Bingeman Park in Kitchener, Ontario.)

Candidate	Votes	Percentage
Donald C. MacDonald	859	69.9
Jim Renwick	370	30.1
Total	1,229	100

=== 1970 leadership convention ===
(Held on October 4, 1970 at the Royal York Hotel in Toronto.)

Candidate	Votes	Percentage
Stephen Lewis	1,188	64.1
Walter Pitman	642	34.7
Douglas Campbell	21	1.1
Total	1,851	100

=== 1972 leadership challenge ===
(Held on December 10, 1972, at the Four Seasons Sheraton Hotel in Toronto, Ontario.)

Candidate	Votes	Percentage
Stephen Lewis	752	85.8
Douglas Campbell	124	14.1
Total	876	100

An additional 137 ballots were spoiled. If the spoiled votes are factored in then Lewis received 74.2% support overall

=== 1978 leadership convention ===
(Held on February 5, 1978, at the Sheraton Centre in Toronto.)

= Eliminated from next round
= Winner

Delegate support by ballot
Candidate	1st Ballot		2nd Ballot		
Name	Votes	%	Votes	%	+/− (pp)
Michael Cassidy	675	37.6	980	54.8	+17.2
Ian Deans	623	34.7	809	45.2	+10.5
Michael Breaugh	499	27.8	Eliminated (endorsed Cassidy)		
Total	1,797	100.0	1,789	100.0	-8

=== 1982 leadership convention ===
(Held on February 7, 1982 at the Harbour Castle Convention Centre in Toronto.)

Candidate	Votes	Percentage
Bob Rae	1,356	64.6
Richard Johnston	512	24.4
Jim Foulds	232	11.0
Total	2,100	100

=== 1986 leadership challenge ===
(Held on June 22, 1986, at Copps Coliseum in Hamilton, Ontario.)

Candidate	Votes	Percentage
Bob Rae	776	95.3
Ian Orenstein	38	4.7
Total	814	100

=== 1996 leadership convention ===
(Held on June 22, 1996, at Copps Coliseum in Hamilton, Ontario.)

After the first ballot, Silipo was eliminated and he endorsed Hampton. After the 2nd ballot, Kormos was eliminated but he endorsed no one and released his delegates. There were eighty spoiled ballots on the final count, mostly from disgruntled supporters of Kormos.

= Eliminated from next round
= Released delegates
= Winner

Delegate support by ballot
Candidate	1st Ballot		2nd Ballot			3rd Ballot		
Name	Votes	%	Votes	%	+/− (pp)	Votes	%	+/− (pp)
Howard Hampton	649	33.7	806	42.4	+8.7	971	55.0	+12.6
Frances Lankin	611	31.7	691	36.4	+4.7	793	45.0	+8.6
Peter Kormos	434	22.5	402	21.2	-1.3	Released delegates		
Tony Silipo	232	12.0	Eliminated (endorsed Hampton)					
Total	1,926	100.0	1,899	100.0	-27	1,764	100.0	-135

=== 2009 leadership election ===
(Held on March 7, 2009, at Copps Coliseum in Hamilton, Ontario)

= Eliminated from next round
= Endorsed another candidate
= Winner

Weighted vote support by ballot
Candidate	1st Ballot		2nd Ballot			3rd Ballot		
Name	Weighted votes	%	Weighted votes	%	+/− (pp)	Weighted votes	%	+/− (pp)
Andrea Horwath	4,625.29	37.1	5,259.06	43.6	+6.5	6,732.34	60.4	+16.8
Peter Tabuns	3,437.93	27.6	3,819.82	31.7	+4.1	4,420.66	39.6	+7.9
Gilles Bisson	2,954.23	23.7	2,988.12	24.8	+1.1	Endorsed Horwath		
Michael Prue	1,438.44	11.5	Eliminated (endorsed Bisson)					
Total	12,455.89	100.0	12,067.00	100.0	-388.89	11,152.90	100.0	-914.10

Starting with the 2009 leadership election, the Ontario NDP instituted a modified one member one vote system in which the vote is calculated so that ballots cast by labour delegates have 25% weight in the total result, while votes cast by party members have a weight of 75% in the overall result.

=== 2023 leadership election ===
(Held on February 4, 2023, at the Metro Toronto Convention Centre in downtown Toronto)

Candidate	Votes
Marit Stiles	acclaimed
