= Cathay Wagantall =

Canadian politician

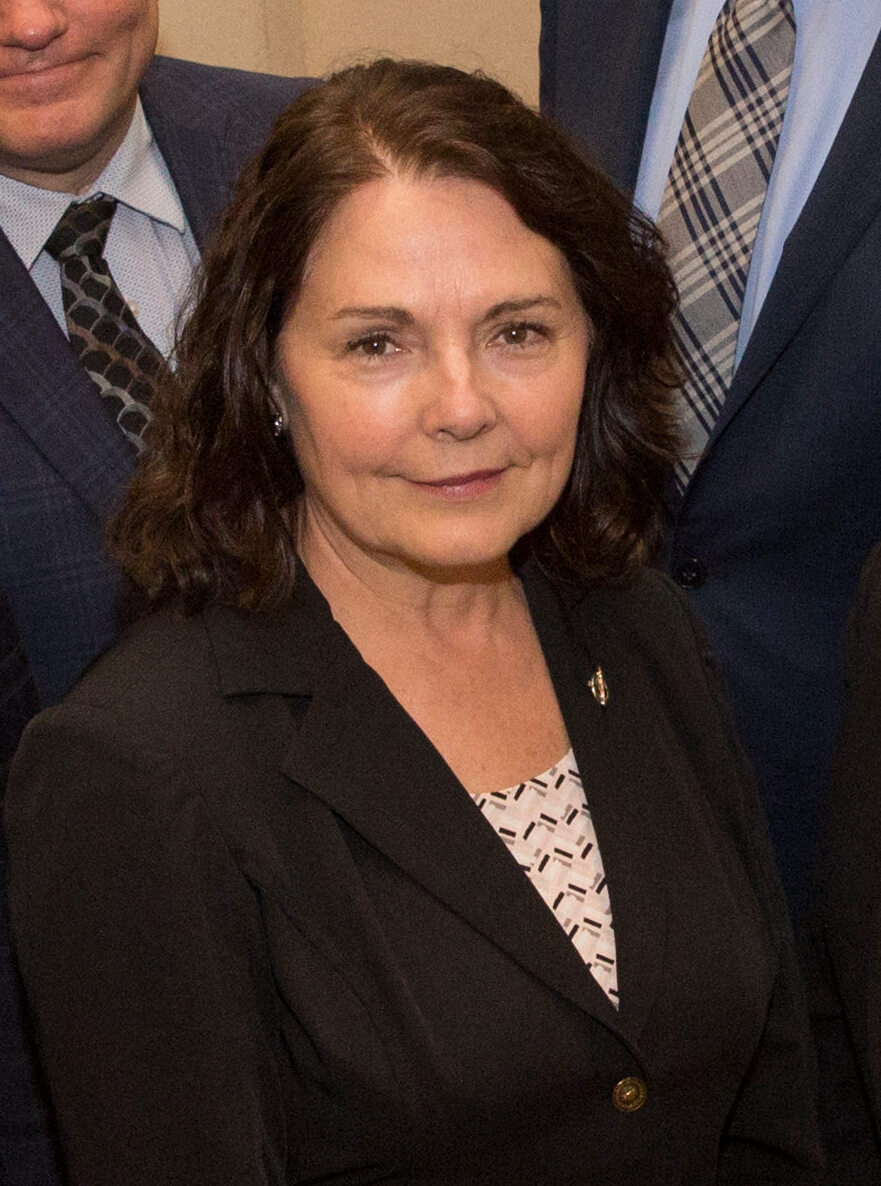

Member of Parliament for Yorkton—Melville
- In office October 19, 2015 – August 31, 2026
- Preceded by: Garry Breitkreuz

Personal details
- Born: Cathay Caswell; March 7, 1956 (age 70) Regina, Saskatchewan, Canada
- Party: Conservative
- Spouse: H. Martin Wagantall (m. 1976)
- Children: 3
- Education: University of Saskatchewan
- Profession: businesswoman; politician

Cathay Wagantall (née Caswell; born March 7, 1956) is a Canadian former politician, educator, and businesswoman. She was a Member of Parliament in the House of Commons of Canada representing the federal electoral riding of Yorkton—Melville from the 2015 Canadian federal election until her resignation in 2026.

== Biography ==
Originally from Regina, Wagantall was raised in southern Saskatchewan until she moved with her parents and six siblings to Esterhazy in 1967.

On full scholarship, she completed three of four years of her Bachelor of Science in Physical Education with top honours at the University of Saskatchewan. During her summers, she worked in hospitals and level 4 care homes.

After traveling the world for a couple of years, Wagantall and her husband entered into a partnership in a lumberyard and contracting business in Springside. They eventually bought out the other partners, then lost their business during the early 1980s recession.

Wagantall moved to Edmonton in 1985. She served as the athletic director for what was then North American Baptist College (later Taylor College and Seminary).

In 1991, their family moved to Lloydminster, Alberta where her husband was a pastor in NewLife Community Church for seven years. During that time Wagantall coached community, junior and senior high basketball and worked as a teacher's assistant with special needs children in kindergarten and high school.

Upon returning to Edmonton in 1998, Wagantall worked for ten years at Taylor University College and Seminary in development, accounting and student loans. She also worked as a Sunday School teacher.

In 2004 Wagantall served on the Conservative Party of Canada Board of Directors for Edmonton-Mill Woods-Beaumont as the election readiness chair, president and financial agent. She door-knocked with then-candidate Tim Uppal against incumbent David Kilgour, and served as campaign manager for Mike Lake in 2006 and 2008. She served official agent for Tim Uppal in 2011. She worked in Uppal's Edmonton-Sherwood Park constituency office until March 2011, when she and her husband returned home to Esterhazy to own and operate Positive Signs, a sign and print company.

== Federal politics ==
In November 2014, Wagantall won the Conservative nomination in Yorkton—Melville for the 2015 federal election. On October 19, 2015, she won the seat with 59.2% of the vote. In the 42nd Parliament Wagantall introduced one private member bill, Bill C-225 titled Protection of Pregnant Women and Their Preborn Children Act (Cassie and Molly's Law), which sought to add a new class of person, a "preborn child", into the Criminal Code and make injuring or causing death to the preborn child while committing or attempting to commit another offence against a female person that the person knows is pregnant to be a separate offense. While the bill was similar to Ken Epp's Unborn Victims of Crime Act, Bill C-485, which received second reading and referral to committee in March 2008 during the 39th Parliament, Wagantall's Bill C-225 was defeated in a vote in October 2016 with only members of the Conservative Party voting in favour.

Wagantall was re-elected in the 2019 election. During the ensuing 43rd Canadian Parliament, she introduced one private member bill, Bill C-233, An Act to amend the Criminal Code (sex-selective abortion) which sought to create a new offense within the Criminal Code, punishable by up to 5 years imprisonment, applicable to medical practitioners who perform an abortion based solely on the grounds of the child's genetic sex. It was brought to a vote on June 2, 2021, but defeated with only Conservatives Party members voting in favour. In the 2020 Conservative Party of Canada leadership election she endorsed Leslyn Lewis.

After the House of Commons introduced a vaccine mandate, Wagantall claimed a medical exemption. It was rejected and she attended House meetings virtually.

She was re-elected in the 2021 election. During the campaign, her campaign manager organized an online petition against mask mandates in Yorkton's Good Spirit School Division and Christ the Teacher Catholic Schools. She also ran a Facebook page on the topic.

During the "Freedom Convoy" protests in Ottawa, Wagantall shared an unfounded claim that Prime Minister Justin Trudeau's official photographer, Adam Scotti, had been sent to the protest to photograph a man with a Confederate flag. Wagantall claimed that this was to "misrepresent thousands of law-abiding, hard-working Canadian truckers and millions across the nation supporting them." She later deleted the Facebook post, and refused to comment on the matter.

Wagantall was re-elected in the 2025 Canadian federal election. On July 28, 2025, she announced she would not be a candidate in the 46th Canadian federal election. On June 17, 2026, she announced she would resign on August 31, and gave her farewell speech in the House of Commons that day.

== Electoral record ==
2025 Canadian federal election: Yorkton—Melville
Party	Candidate	Votes	%	±%	Expenditures
Conservative	Cathay Wagantall	28,702	77.55	+8.76	
Liberal	Luke Guimond	5,338	14.42	+8.11	
New Democratic	Michaela Krakowetz	2,034	5.50	-6.61	
Green	Valerie Brooks	713	1.93	+0.19	
Libertarian	Alec Guggenmos	226	0.61	–	
Total valid votes/expense limit		37,013			
Total rejected ballots					
Turnout					
Eligible voters		56,000			
Source: Elections Canada

2021 Canadian federal election: Yorkton—Melville
Party	Candidate	Votes	%	±%	Expenditures
Conservative	Cathay Wagantall	23,850	68.67	-7.48	$48,266.24
New Democratic	Halsten David Rust	4,237	12.20	-0.05	$504.29
People's	Braden Robertson	3,247	9.35	+6.92	$8,392.80
Liberal	Jordan Ames-Sinclair	2,183	6.29	-0.13	$2,023.58
Green	Valerie Brooks	615	1.77	-0.99	$1,434.77
Maverick	Denise Loucks	601	1.73	–	$2,354.31
Total valid votes/expense limit		34,733	–	–	$119,557.84
Total rejected ballots					
Turnout			66.25	-6.56	
Eligible voters		52,429			
Conservative hold		Swing		-3.72	
Source: Elections Canada

2019 Canadian federal election: Yorkton—Melville
Party	Candidate	Votes	%	±%	Expenditures
Conservative	Cathay Wagantall	29,523	76.15	+16.95	$47,858.75
New Democratic	Carter Antoine	4,747	12.24	-7.96	$224.73
Liberal	Connor Moen	2,488	6.42	-11.38	none listed
Green	Stacey Wiebe	1,070	2.76	-0.04	$386.96
People's	Ryan Schultz	941	2.43	–	none listed
Total valid votes/expense limit		38,769	99.27		–
Total rejected ballots		287	0.73	–	
Turnout		39,056	72.81	–	
Eligible voters		53,643			
Conservative hold		Swing		+12.50	
Source: Elections Canada

2015 Canadian federal election: Yorkton—Melville
Party	Candidate	Votes	%	±%	Expenditures
Conservative	Cathay Wagantall	21,683	59.22	-9.66	$57,632.77
New Democratic	Doug Ottenbreit	7,396	20.20	-1.76	$21,043.83
Liberal	Brooke Taylor Malinoski	6,504	17.76	+11.15	$3,627.04
Green	Elaine Marie Hughes	1,030	2.81	+0.43	$130.31
Total valid votes/expense limit		36,613	100.0		$229,969.51
Total rejected ballots		95	–	–	
Turnout		36,708	68.36	+4.96	
Eligible voters		53,694			
Conservative hold		Swing		-3.95	
Source: Elections Canada
