= Garry Breitkreuz =

Canadian politician

Garry W. Breitkreuz

Member of Parliament for Yorkton—Melville
- In office October 25, 1993 – October 19, 2015
- Preceded by: Lorne Nystrom
- Succeeded by: Cathay Wagantall

Personal details
- Born: October 21, 1945 (age 80) Yorkton, Saskatchewan, Canada
- Party: Reform (1993-2000); Canadian Alliance (2000-2003); Conservative (2003-present)
- Spouse: Lydia Breitkreuz
- Profession: teacher

Garry W. Breitkreuz (pronounced Bright-Krites) (born October 21, 1945) is a Canadian politician. He was the Conservative Party of Canada member of the House of Commons of Canada for Yorkton—Melville from 1993 to 2015. He was formerly a member of the Reform Party of Canada (1993–2000) and the Canadian Alliance (2000–2003). While he had no formal position in the cabinet, as an Opposition member he was Deputy House Leader of the Opposition, Conservative Party Deputy House Leader, Deputy Whip of the Official Opposition, Chief Opposition Whip, and Critic to the Solicitor General.

Breitkreuz has been known to be the most outspoken member of the House of Commons on his opposition to the Canadian gun registry.

In 2005, Breitkreuz was granted the Sport Shooting Ambassador Award by the World Forum on the Future of Sport Shooting Activities.

== Electoral record ==
2011 Canadian federal election: Yorkton—Melville
Party	Candidate	Votes	%	±%	Expenditures
Conservative	Garry Breitkreuz	21,906	68.9	+0.9	$68,801
New Democratic	Doug Ottenbreit	6,931	21.8	+1.0	$13,345
Liberal	Kash Andreychuk	2,167	6.8	+1.4	$40,387
Green	Elaine Marie Hughes	774	2.4	-3.3	$540
Total valid votes/expense limit		31,778	100.0		$92,190
Total rejected ballots		90	0.3	-0.1	
Turnout		31,868	63.4	+6	
Eligible voters		50,254	–	–	
Conservative hold		Swing		-0.05	

2008 Canadian federal election: Yorkton—Melville
Party	Candidate	Votes	%	±%	Expenditures
Conservative	Garry Breitkreuz	19,824	68.0	+4.6	$65,139
New Democratic	Doug Ottenbreit	6,076	20.8	+2.0	$12,454
Green	Jen Antony	1,664	5.7	+2.9	$3,767
Liberal	Bryan H. Bell	1,578	5.4	-8.5	–
Total valid votes/expense limit		29,142	100.0		$89,452
Total rejected ballots		107	0.4	+0.2	
Turnout		29,249	57	-7	
Conservative hold		Swing		+1.3	

2006 Canadian federal election: Yorkton—Melville
Party	Candidate	Votes	%	±%	Expenditures
Conservative	Garry Breitkreuz	20,736	63.5	+0.6	$55,627
New Democratic	Jason Dennison	6,165	18.9	+4.1	$19,488
Liberal	Mervin Cushman	4,558	14.0	-0.8	$18,223
Green	Keith Neu	923	2.8	+1.2	$641
Independent	Carl Barabonoff	287	0.9	–	$739
Total valid votes		32,669	100.0		–
Total rejected ballots		80	0.2	-0.1	
Turnout		32,749	64.3	+4.1	
Conservative hold		Swing		-1.75	

2004 Canadian federal election: Yorkton—Melville
Party	Candidate	Votes	%	±%	Expenditures
Conservative	Garry Breitkreuz	19,940	62.9	-5.0	$61,866
New Democratic	Don Olson	5,890	18.6	+2.8	$18,736
Liberal	Ted Quewezance	4,697	14.8	-1.4	$32,905
Green	Ralph Pilchner	630	1.98	+2.0	–
Independent	David Sawkiw	524	1.7	–	$6,330
Total valid votes		31,681	100.0		–
Total rejected ballots		113	0.4	0.0	
Turnout		31,794	60.2	-3.4	
Conservative hold		Swing		-3.9	

Note: Conservative vote is compared to the total of the Canadian Alliance vote and Progressive Conservative vote in 2000 election.

2000 Canadian federal election: Yorkton—Melville
Party	Candidate	Votes	%	±%	Expenditures
Alliance	Garry Breitkreuz*	19,978	63.0	+12.9	$52,574
Liberal	Ken Pilon	5,153	16.2	-2.6	$24,027
New Democratic	Peter Champagne	5,007	15.8	-9.2	$9,235
Progressive Conservative	Brent Haas	1,583	5.0	-1.1	$543
Total valid votes		31,721	100.0		–
Total rejected ballots		103	0.3	0.0	
Turnout		31,824	63.6	-3.3	
Alliance hold		Swing		+7.75	

Note: Canadian Alliance vote is compared to the Reform vote in 1997 election.

1997 Canadian federal election: Yorkton—Melville
Party	Candidate	Votes	%	±%	Expenditures
Reform	Garry Breitkreuz*	17,216	50.1	+17.4	$53,836
New Democratic	Evan Carlson	8,583	25.0	-4.4	$43,899
Liberal	Lloyd Sandercock	6,481	18.9	-10.6	$39,999
Progressive Conservative	Ivan Daunt	2,101	6.1	-2.6	$6,357
Total valid votes		34,381	100.0		–
Total rejected ballots		116	0.3		
Turnout		34,497	66.9	–	
Reform hold		Swing		+10.90	

1993 Canadian federal election: Yorkton—Melville
Party	Candidate	Votes	%	±%
Reform	Garry Breitkreuz	10,605	32.7	-1.9
Liberal	Jim Walters	9,531	29.4	+15.8
New Democratic	Lorne Nystrom*	9,487	29.2	-21.9
Progressive Conservative	Bob Reitenbach	2,825	8.7	-25.9
Total valid votes		32,448	100.0	
Reform gain from New Democratic		Swing		-8.85

* Denotes incumbent.
