= 1995 New Democratic Party leadership election =

Party election in Canada

- October 12–15, 1995
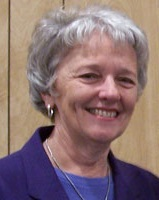

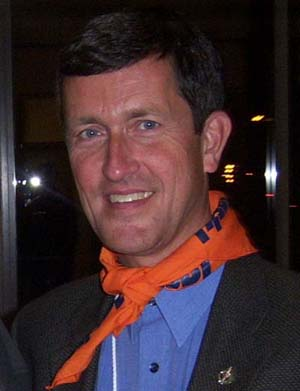

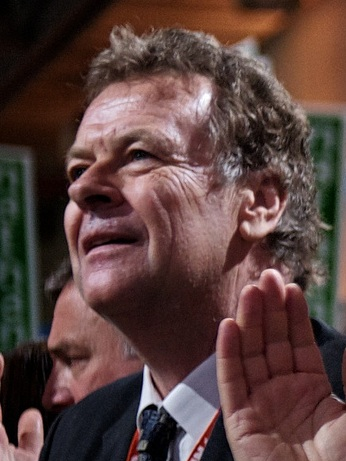
Candidate	Alexa McDonough	Svend Robinson	Lorne Nystrom
Second ballot vote	Acclaimed	Withdrew	Eliminated
First ballot vote	566 (32.62%)	655 (37.75%)	545 (31.41%)
Leader before election
Audrey McLaughlin
Elected leader
Alexa McDonough

1995 New Democratic Party leadership election
- Date: October 12 – 15, 1995
- Convention: Ottawa Congress Centre, Ottawa, Ontario
- Resigning leader: Audrey McLaughlin
- Won by: Alexa McDonough
- Ballots: 1
- Candidates: 1

From October 12–15, 1995, the New Democratic Party held a leadership election to elect a successor to Audrey McLaughlin. Although Svend Robinson led on the first ballot, he conceded the leadership to Alexa McDonough, who was appointed by a motion put forward by Robinson. This was the last NDP leadership convention that was decided solely by delegates attending and voting at the convention.

== Background ==
As the fortunes of the Nova Scotia NDP were slowly rising during the mid-1990s, the same could not be said of its federal counterpart as the 1993 Canadian federal election was an unmitigated disaster for the NDP. Under Audrey McLaughlin's leadership, the party suffered its worst defeat since the late 1950s in terms of seats, and the worst showing for a federal social-democratic party in the 20th century, with just seven percent of the vote. The party had nine seats, three short of the twelve seats needed to have official party status in the House of Commons, and all the extra funding, research, office space and Question Period privileges that status accords. In the aftermath of the 1993 election, the party set about reforming its policies and purpose, with McLaughlin announcing on April 18, 1994 that she would step down as leader by 1996. McLaughlin, faced with internal squabbles like the ones that occurred in the Nova Scotia party back in 1980, advanced her departure from the end of 1996 to the end of 1995. With an internal party atmosphere that could best be described as toxic, Alexa McDonough, Lorne Nystrom, and Svend Robinson, entered the leadership campaign in the spring of 1995. The conditions were similar to the ones that McDonough faced during her first leadership campaign in Nova Scotia during 1980: a divided party that was self-immolating.

== Primaries ==
Results of the primaries

To make it on the convention ballot, a leadership candidate had to win one of the primaries held throughout the country ahead of the convention. A candidate could also make it on the ballot if a 25% national vote threshold was reached. Herschel Hardin was the only candidate who failed to win a primary and he was thus excluded from the convention ballot. Nystrom won the primary, with 44%, well ahead of Robinson and McDonough.

Quebec Primary

Candidate	Percentage
Svend Robinson	44.94%
Lorne Nystrom	34.82%
Alexa McDonough	10.12%
Herschel Hardin	10.12%
Total	243

Atlantic Primary

Candidate	Votes	Percentage
Alexa McDonough	870	68.50%
Svend Robinson	268	21.10%
Lorne Nystrom	92	7.24%
Herschel Hardin	40	3.15%
Total	1270	100%

Ontario Primary

Candidate	Percentage
Svend Robinson	43.67%
Lorne Nystrom	26.17%
Alexa McDonough	22.87%
Herschel Hardin	7.29%
Total Votes	4,592

BC/North Primary

Candidate	Votes	Percentage
Svend Robinson	2640	50.80%
Lorne Nystrom	1524	29.32%
Alexa McDonough	625	12.03%
Herschel Hardin	408	7.85%
Total	5,197	100%

Prairies Primary

Candidate	Percentage
Lorne Nystrom	71.86%
Svend Robinson	18.07%
Alexa McDonough	5.60%
Herschel Hardin	4.47%
Total	100%

Labour Primary

Candidate	Percentage
Lorne Nystrom	38.02%
Svend Robinson	32.32%
Alexa McDonough	28.46%
Herschel Hardin	1.20%
Total	100%

Primaries - Total

Candidate	Percentage
Lorne Nystrom	44.69%
Svend Robinson	32.06%
Alexa McDonough	18.47%
Herschel Hardin	4.78%
Total	100%

== Leadership ballot ==
First Ballot

Candidate	Delegate Count	Percentage
Svend Robinson	655	37.8%
Alexa McDonough	566	32.6%
Lorne Nystrom	545	31.5%
Total	1,735	100%

Prior to the NDP leadership convention on October 14, 1995, McDonough was widely viewed as an also-ran behind the leading contenders, Svend Robinson and Lorne Nystrom. McDonough surprised many media pundits at the convention by placing second, with 566 votes on the first ballot, ahead of Nystrom who received 514 votes. Although Robinson had placed first on that ballot, with 655 votes, Nystrom supporters seemed likely to support a tacit "anyone but Svend" sentiment and to shift to McDonough. Robinson's political position was seen as considerably more on the activist left side of the party than Nystrom's or McDonough's. He sensed that most of Nystrom's supporters would go to McDonough on the second ballot, giving her the victory. Comprehending that McDonough would pick up enough Nystrom supporters to make his odds of winning practically non-existent, Robinson conceded to McDonough before a second ballot could be held, and moved a motion to formally acclaim her as the new leader.

== Aftermath ==
Robinson's move helped to unify the party and shake his image as a lone wolf. After the vote, Robinson met with about 200 of his supporters, who were shocked, and in some cases, outraged at what he did.

In the 1997 election, McDonough's first as leader, the party won 21 seats, including a historic breakthrough in the Atlantic provinces. McDonough was elected as the Member of Parliament for the federal riding of Halifax, the same riding in which she ran unsuccessfully in 1979 and 1980. She would win Halifax three more times until she retired from politics in 2008, and the party did not lose official party status during her leadership.
