= Herschel Hardin =

Canadian writer and political activist

- Born: 1936 (age 89–90); Vegreville, Alberta, Canada
- Education: Queen's University at Kingston
- Occupation: Writer • playwright • commentator • political activist
- Spouse: Marguerite Hardin

Herschel Hardin (born 1936) is a British Columbia-based writer, playwright, commentator and political activist and consultant best known for having contested the leadership of the New Democratic Party of Canada in 1995.

== Life and career ==
Hardin grew up in Vegreville, Alberta and attended university at Queen's University in Kingston, Ontario.

He started his professional career as a playwright following his graduation. His best known play is Esker Mike and His Wife, Agiluk.

Hardin worked as a freelance radio broadcaster for both CBC Radio and Radio-Canada (the CBC's French-language network). In the 1970s, he established the Association for Public Broadcasting in British Columbia and the Capital Cable Co-operative in Victoria to lobby for the expansion of public, non-commercial broadcasting. He was also active as a consumer advocate opposing cable rate increases.

In the late 1970s, he worked as a Vancouver-based editorial page columnist for The Toronto Star writing on politics and economics.

He also wrote a number of non-fiction books, his first being A Nation Unaware: The Canadian Economic Culture (1974), which explored the key role of public enterprise in the development of Canada's economy and the country's distinctive interregional redistribution. This was followed by Closed Circuits: The Sellout of Canadian Television (1985), an exposé of television politics and how power works in Canada, and The Privatization Putsch (1989), a debunking of the privatization movement. A subsequent major work, The New Bureaucracy: Waste and Folly in the Private Sector (1991), detailed the bureaucratic character and excesses of the corporate world (including finance and marketing) and how this "new bureaucracy" had become entrenched behind what he called an "ideological screen," in this instance, the ideology of free enterprise. Also of note: Working Dollars: The VanCity Story (1996), a history of Vancity Savings Credit Union, the large credit union in Vancouver and now also in Victoria.

Hardin contested the leadership of the federal New Democratic Party in 1995 following the resignation of Audrey McLaughlin. The only candidate in the four-person race who had never been an elected politician, Hardin ran a grassroots campaign that emphasized democratic socialist themes. He received 4.78% of the vote in the One Member One Vote national party primaries which was insufficient to allow him to proceed to the delegated NDP leadership convention.

He subsequently was an NDP candidate in Vancouver South—Burnaby placing third in the 1997 general election and again in the 2000 federal election.

Hardin served on the board of the publicly run Insurance Corporation of British Columbia in the 1990s and was chair of the board's Road Safety Committee and then its Product Committee.

In the 1990s he returned briefly to playwriting with The New World Order, a political play about what the United States had in store for the world following the first Gulf War. The play was given 10 performances produced by Theatre In the Raw in 1999 at the Havana Theatre in Vancouver, BC and captivated audiences.

Hardin is a member of the Writers' Union of Canada. He has been a longtime environmentalist and is a member of SPEC (Society Promoting Environmental Conservation). Other memberships include the B.C. Civil Liberties Association, Amnesty International, the North Shore Schizophrenia Society, the Canadian Centre for Policy Alternatives, Co-op Radio, Theatre in the Raw, and the Council of Canadians. His commitment to the North Shore Schizophrenia Society has become particularly significant for him in the last couple of decades and has involved everything from major advocacy work to playing Santa Claus at the society's annual Christmas banquet.

He lives with his wife Marguerite in West Vancouver.

== Bibliography ==
Plays

- Esker Mike & His Wife, Agiluk, Burnaby, B.C.: Talonbooks, (1973)
- Great Wave of Civilization Burnaby, B.C.: Talonbooks (1976)
- New World Order (1991)

Non-fiction

- A Nation Unaware, Vancouver: JJ Douglas, (1974)
- Closed Circuits: the Sellout of Canadian Television, Vancouver: Douglas & McIntyre Ltd., (1985)
- The Privatization Putsch, Halifax: Institute for Research on Public Policy, (1989)
- The New Bureaucracy: Waste and Folly in the Private Sector, Toronto: McClelland & Stewart, (1991)
- Working Dollars: The VanCity Story, Vancouver: Douglas & McIntyre Ltd., (1996)
