= Yorkton—Melville =

Federal electoral district in Saskatchewan, Canada

Saskatchewan electoral district
- Interactive map of riding boundaries from the 2025 federal election. Points indicate the cities of Yorkton and Melville.
- Coordinates: 51.929°N 102.751°W

Federal electoral district
- Legislature: House of Commons
MP
Vacant
- District created: 1966
- First contested: 1968
- Last contested: 2025
- District webpage: profile, map

Demographics
- Population (2011): 71,270
- Electors (2015): 53,446
- Area (km²): 43,272
- Pop. density (per km²): 1.6
- Census subdivision(s): Yorkton, Melville, Esterhazy, Canora, Orkney, Kamsack, Hudson Bay, Wadena, Langenburg, Foam Lake

Yorkton—Melville is a federal electoral district in Saskatchewan, Canada, that has been represented in the House of Commons of Canada since 1968.

== Geography ==
The district is in east-central Saskatchewan.

== History ==
The electoral district was created in 1966 from Yorkton, Melville and Mackenzie ridings.

In 2006, 30.2% of the population of the Yorkton—Melville constituency were of Ukrainian ethnic origin, the highest such percentage in Canada. Also during the 2006 election, the Yorkton—Melville riding had the highest percentage of eligible voters over the age of 65, and highest average age of all the then-308 federal electoral districts.

This riding lost a fraction of territory to Regina—Qu'Appelle and gained territory from Saskatoon—Humboldt and a fraction from Desnethé—Missinippi—Churchill River during the 2012 electoral redistribution.

=== Historical boundaries ===
1966 representation order

1976 representation order

1987 representation order

1996 representation order

2003 representation order

2013 representation order

2023 final report

=== Members of Parliament ===
| Parliament | Years | Member | Party |
|---|---|---|---|
Yorkton—Melville; Riding created from Yorkton, Melville and Mackenzie
| 28th | 1968–1972 | Lorne Nystrom | New Democratic |
| 29th | 1972–1974 | Lorne Nystrom | New Democratic |
| 30th | 1974–1979 | Lorne Nystrom | New Democratic |
| 31st | 1979–1980 | Lorne Nystrom | New Democratic |
| 32nd | 1980–1984 | Lorne Nystrom | New Democratic |
| 33rd | 1984–1988 | Lorne Nystrom | New Democratic |
| 34th | 1988–1993 | Lorne Nystrom | New Democratic |
| 35th | 1993–1997 | Garry Breitkreuz | Reform |
| 36th | 1997–2000 | Garry Breitkreuz | Reform |
| 36th | 2000–2000 | Garry Breitkreuz | Alliance |
| 37th | 2000–2003 | Garry Breitkreuz | Alliance |
| 37th | 2003–2004 | Garry Breitkreuz | Conservative |
| 38th | 2004–2006 | Garry Breitkreuz | Conservative |
| 39th | 2006–2008 | Garry Breitkreuz | Conservative |
| 40th | 2008–2011 | Garry Breitkreuz | Conservative |
| 41st | 2011–2015 | Garry Breitkreuz | Conservative |
| 42nd | 2015–2019 | Cathay Wagantall | Conservative |
| 43rd | 2019–2021 | Cathay Wagantall | Conservative |
| 44th | 2021–2025 | Cathay Wagantall | Conservative |
| 45th | 2025–2026 | Cathay Wagantall | Conservative |

== Demographics ==
Panethnic groups in Yorkton—Melville (2011−2021)
| Panethnic group | 2021 | | 2016 | | 2011 | |
| Panethnic group | Pop. | % | Pop. | % | Pop. | % |
|---|---|---|---|---|---|---|
| European (Note: Statistic includes all persons that did not make up part of a visible minority or an indigenous identity.) | 56,145 | 80.71% | 58,820 | 84.6% | 61,600 | 88.21% |
| Indigenous | 8,765 | 12.6% | 7,530 | 10.83% | 6,735 | 9.64% |
| Southeast Asian (Note: Statistic includes total responses of "Filipino" and "Southeast Asian" under visible minority section on census.) | 2,330 | 3.35% | 1,910 | 2.75% | 845 | 1.21% |
| South Asian | 915 | 1.32% | 315 | 0.45% | 40 | 0.06% |
| African | 545 | 0.78% | 310 | 0.45% | 255 | 0.37% |
| East Asian (Note: Statistic includes total responses of "Chinese", "Korean", and "Japanese" under visible minority section on census.) | 400 | 0.58% | 435 | 0.63% | 310 | 0.44% |
| Latin American | 250 | 0.36% | 120 | 0.17% | 0 | 0% |
| Middle Eastern (Note: Statistic includes total responses of "West Asian" and "Arab" under visible minority section on census.) | 80 | 0.12% | 55 | 0.08% | 10 | 0.01% |
| Other/multiracial (Note: Statistic includes total responses of "Visible minority, n.i.e." and "Multiple visible minorities" under visible minority section on census.) | 135 | 0.19% | 60 | 0.09% | 35 | 0.05% |
| Total responses | 69,565 | 97.68% | 69,530 | 97.89% | 69,830 | 97.98% |
| Total population | 71,220 | 100% | 71,031 | 100% | 71,270 | 100% |
Notes: Totals greater than 100% due to multiple origin responses. Demographics based on 2012 Canadian federal electoral redistribution riding boundaries.

== Election results ==
Graph of election results in Yorkton—Melville (minor parties that never got 2% of the vote or didn't run consistently are omitted) View source data.

Canadian federal by-election, December 7, 2026 Resignation of Cathay Wagantall
The by-election will be held on December 7, 2026.
| Party | Candidate | Votes | % | ±% | Expenditures |
|---|---|---|---|---|---|
| Conservative | Nelson Pohl | | | | |
| Liberal | Aaron Kienle | | | | |
| New Democratic | Tammy Bobyk-Jacquemart | | | | |
| Green | Valerie Brooks | | | | |
| People's | Dionne Fehler | | | | |
| Total valid votes | | | | | |
| Total rejected ballots | | | | | |
| Turnout | | | | | |
| Eligible voters | | 56,000 | | | |
Source: Elections Canada

2025 Canadian federal election
| Party | Candidate | Votes | % | ±% | Expenditures |
|---|---|---|---|---|---|
| Conservative | Cathay Wagantall | 28,702 | 77.55 | +8.76 | |
| Liberal | Luke Guimond | 5,338 | 14.42 | +8.11 | |
| New Democratic | Michaela Krakowetz | 2,034 | 5.50 | -6.61 | |
| Green | Valerie Brooks | 713 | 1.93 | +0.19 | |
| Libertarian | Alec Guggenmos | 226 | 0.61 | – | |
| Total valid votes/expense limit | | 37,013 | | | |
| Total rejected ballots | | | | | |
| Turnout | | | | | |
| Eligible voters | | 56,000 | | | |
Source: Elections Canada

2021 Canadian federal election
| Party | Candidate | Votes | % | ±% | Expenditures |
|---|---|---|---|---|---|
| Conservative | Cathay Wagantall | 23,850 | 68.67 | -7.48 | $48,266.24 |
| New Democratic | Halsten David Rust | 4,237 | 12.20 | -0.05 | $504.29 |
| People's | Braden Robertson | 3,247 | 9.35 | +6.92 | $8,392.80 |
| Liberal | Jordan Ames-Sinclair | 2,183 | 6.29 | -0.13 | $2,023.58 |
| Green | Valerie Brooks | 615 | 1.77 | -0.99 | $1,434.77 |
| Maverick | Denise Loucks | 601 | 1.73 | – | $2,354.31 |
| Total valid votes/expense limit | | 34,733 | – | – | $119,557.84 |
| Total rejected ballots | | | | | |
| Turnout | | | 66.25 | -6.56 | |
| Eligible voters | | 52,429 | | | |
| Conservative hold | | Swing | | -3.72 | |
Source: Elections Canada

2019 Canadian federal election
| Party | Candidate | Votes | % | ±% | Expenditures |
|---|---|---|---|---|---|
| Conservative | Cathay Wagantall | 29,523 | 76.15 | +16.95 | $47,858.75 |
| New Democratic | Carter Antoine | 4,747 | 12.24 | -7.96 | $224.73 |
| Liberal | Connor Moen | 2,488 | 6.42 | -11.38 | none listed |
| Green | Stacey Wiebe | 1,070 | 2.76 | -0.04 | $386.96 |
| People's | Ryan Schultz | 941 | 2.43 | – | none listed |
| Total valid votes/expense limit | | 38,769 | 99.27 | | – |
| Total rejected ballots | | 287 | 0.73 | – | |
| Turnout | | 39,056 | 72.81 | – | |
| Eligible voters | | 53,643 | | | |
| Conservative hold | | Swing | | +12.50 | |
Source: Elections Canada

2015 Canadian federal election
| Party | Candidate | Votes | % | ±% | Expenditures |
|---|---|---|---|---|---|
| Conservative | Cathay Wagantall | 21,683 | 59.22 | -9.66 | $57,632.77 |
| New Democratic | Doug Ottenbreit | 7,396 | 20.20 | -1.76 | $21,043.83 |
| Liberal | Brooke Taylor Malinoski | 6,504 | 17.76 | +11.15 | $3,627.04 |
| Green | Elaine Marie Hughes | 1,030 | 2.81 | +0.43 | $130.31 |
| Total valid votes/expense limit | | 36,613 | 100.0 | | $229,969.51 |
| Total rejected ballots | | 95 | – | – | |
| Turnout | | 36,708 | 68.36 | +4.96 | |
| Eligible voters | | 53,694 | | | |
| Conservative hold | | Swing | | -3.95 | |
Source: Elections Canada

2011 federal election redistributed results
| Party | Vote | % |
|---|---|---|
| Conservative | 23,607 | 68.88 |
| New Democratic | 7,526 | 21.96 |
| Liberal | 2,266 | 6.61 |
| Green | 817 | 2.38 |
| Independent | 58 | 0.17 |

2011 Canadian federal election
| Party | Candidate | Votes | % | ±% | Expenditures |
|---|---|---|---|---|---|
| Conservative | Garry Breitkreuz | 21,906 | 68.9 | +0.9 | $68,801 |
| New Democratic | Doug Ottenbreit | 6,931 | 21.8 | +1.0 | $13,345 |
| Liberal | Kash Andreychuk | 2,167 | 6.8 | +1.4 | $40,387 |
| Green | Elaine Marie Hughes | 774 | 2.4 | -3.3 | $540 |
| Total valid votes/expense limit | | 31,778 | 100.0 | | $92,190 |
| Total rejected ballots | | 90 | 0.3 | -0.1 | |
| Turnout | | 31,868 | 63.4 | +6 | |
| Eligible voters | | 50,254 | – | – | |
| Conservative hold | | Swing | | -0.05 | |

2008 Canadian federal election
| Party | Candidate | Votes | % | ±% | Expenditures |
|---|---|---|---|---|---|
| Conservative | Garry Breitkreuz | 19,824 | 68.0 | +4.6 | $65,139 |
| New Democratic | Doug Ottenbreit | 6,076 | 20.8 | +2.0 | $12,454 |
| Green | Jen Antony | 1,664 | 5.7 | +2.9 | $3,767 |
| Liberal | Bryan H. Bell | 1,578 | 5.4 | -8.5 | – |
| Total valid votes/expense limit | | 29,142 | 100.0 | | $89,452 |
| Total rejected ballots | | 107 | 0.4 | +0.2 | |
| Turnout | | 29,249 | 57 | -7 | |
| Conservative hold | | Swing | | +1.3 | |

2006 Canadian federal election
| Party | Candidate | Votes | % | ±% | Expenditures |
|---|---|---|---|---|---|
| Conservative | Garry Breitkreuz | 20,736 | 63.5 | +0.6 | $55,627 |
| New Democratic | Jason Dennison | 6,165 | 18.9 | +4.1 | $19,488 |
| Liberal | Mervin Cushman | 4,558 | 14.0 | -0.8 | $18,223 |
| Green | Keith Neu | 923 | 2.8 | +1.2 | $641 |
| Independent | Carl Barabonoff | 287 | 0.9 | – | $739 |
| Total valid votes | | 32,669 | 100.0 | | – |
| Total rejected ballots | | 80 | 0.2 | -0.1 | |
| Turnout | | 32,749 | 64.3 | +4.1 | |
| Conservative hold | | Swing | | -1.75 | |

2004 Canadian federal election
| Party | Candidate | Votes | % | ±% | Expenditures |
|---|---|---|---|---|---|
| Conservative | Garry Breitkreuz | 19,940 | 62.9 | -5.0 | $61,866 |
| New Democratic | Don Olson | 5,890 | 18.6 | +2.8 | $18,736 |
| Liberal | Ted Quewezance | 4,697 | 14.8 | -1.4 | $32,905 |
| Green | Ralph Pilchner | 630 | 1.98 | +2.0 | – |
| Independent | David Sawkiw | 524 | 1.7 | – | $6,330 |
| Total valid votes | | 31,681 | 100.0 | | – |
| Total rejected ballots | | 113 | 0.4 | 0.0 | |
| Turnout | | 31,794 | 60.2 | -3.4 | |
| Conservative hold | | Swing | | -3.9 | |

Note: Conservative vote is compared to the total of the Canadian Alliance vote and Progressive Conservative vote in 2000 election.

2000 Canadian federal election
| Party | Candidate | Votes | % | ±% | Expenditures |
|---|---|---|---|---|---|
| Alliance | Garry Breitkreuz* | 19,978 | 63.0 | +12.9 | $52,574 |
| Liberal | Ken Pilon | 5,153 | 16.2 | -2.6 | $24,027 |
| New Democratic | Peter Champagne | 5,007 | 15.8 | -9.2 | $9,235 |
| Progressive Conservative | Brent Haas | 1,583 | 5.0 | -1.1 | $543 |
| Total valid votes | | 31,721 | 100.0 | | – |
| Total rejected ballots | | 103 | 0.3 | 0.0 | |
| Turnout | | 31,824 | 63.6 | -3.3 | |
| Alliance hold | | Swing | | +7.75 | |

Note: Canadian Alliance vote is compared to the Reform vote in 1997 election.

1997 Canadian federal election
| Party | Candidate | Votes | % | ±% | Expenditures |
|---|---|---|---|---|---|
| Reform | Garry Breitkreuz* | 17,216 | 50.1 | +17.4 | $53,836 |
| New Democratic | Evan Carlson | 8,583 | 25.0 | -4.4 | $43,899 |
| Liberal | Lloyd Sandercock | 6,481 | 18.9 | -10.6 | $39,999 |
| Progressive Conservative | Ivan Daunt | 2,101 | 6.1 | -2.6 | $6,357 |
| Total valid votes | | 34,381 | 100.0 | | – |
| Total rejected ballots | | 116 | 0.3 | | |
| Turnout | | 34,497 | 66.9 | – | |
| Reform hold | | Swing | | +10.90 | |

1993 Canadian federal election
| Party | Candidate | Votes | % | ±% |
|---|---|---|---|---|
| Reform | Garry Breitkreuz | 10,605 | 32.7 | -1.9 |
| Liberal | Jim Walters | 9,531 | 29.4 | +15.8 |
| New Democratic | Lorne Nystrom* | 9,487 | 29.2 | -21.9 |
| Progressive Conservative | Bob Reitenbach | 2,825 | 8.7 | -25.9 |
| Total valid votes | | 32,448 | 100.0 | |
| Reform gain from New Democratic | | Swing | | -8.85 |

* Denotes incumbent.

1988 Canadian federal election
| Party | Candidate | Votes | % | ±% |
|---|---|---|---|---|
| New Democratic | Lorne Nystrom* | 18,523 | 51.1 | -0.2 |
| Progressive Conservative | Virginia Battiste | 12,543 | 34.6 | +1.2 |
| Liberal | J. Robert Autumn | 5,149 | 14.2 | +0.1 |
| Total valid votes | | 36,215 | 100.0 | |

1984 Canadian federal election
| Party | Candidate | Votes | % | ±% |
|---|---|---|---|---|
| New Democratic | Lorne Nystrom* | 18,116 | 51.3 | +5.6 |
| Progressive Conservative | Ken Wasylysen | 11,800 | 33.4 | -3.9 |
| Liberal | Arliss Dellow | 4,996 | 14.1 | -2.8 |
| Confederation of Regions | Bill Kruczko | 400 | 1.1 | – |
| Total valid votes | | 35,312 | 100.0 | |

1980 Canadian federal election
| Party | Candidate | Votes | % | ±% |
|---|---|---|---|---|
| New Democratic | Lorne Nystrom* | 15,240 | 45.7 | -1.8 |
| Progressive Conservative | Ben Hudye | 12,450 | 37.3 | +4.9 |
| Liberal | Gordon Hollinger | 5,664 | 17.0 | +1.3 |
| Total valid votes | | 33,354 | 100.0 | |
lop.parl.ca

1979 Canadian federal election
| Party | Candidate | Votes | % | ±% |
|---|---|---|---|---|
| New Democratic | Lorne Nystrom | 16,677 | 47.5 | +1.9 |
| Progressive Conservative | John Miller | 11,381 | 32.4 | +10.7 |
| Liberal | Phil Kotyk | 5,501 | 15.7 | -15.4 |
| Independent | Ben Hudye | 1,566 | 4.5 | – |
| Total valid votes | | 35,125 | 100.0 | |

1974 Canadian federal election
| Party | Candidate | Votes | % | ±% |
|---|---|---|---|---|
| New Democratic | Lorne Nystrom | 14,586 | 45.6 | -2.1 |
| Liberal | Stan Kyba | 9,946 | 31.1 | +2.5 |
| Progressive Conservative | Marvin Wentzell | 6,963 | 21.8 | -0.7 |
| Social Credit | Harry Hoedel | 338 | 1.1 | -0.2 |
| Communist | George Shlakoff | 179 | 0.6 | – |
| Total valid votes | | 32,012 | 100.0 | |

1972 Canadian federal election
| Party | Candidate | Votes | % | ±% |
|---|---|---|---|---|
| New Democratic | Lorne Nystrom | 15,998 | 47.7 | +8.8 |
| Liberal | Stephanie Potoski | 9,574 | 28.5 | -1.1 |
| Progressive Conservative | Don Armour | 7,542 | 22.5 | -9.0 |
| Social Credit | Harry Hoedel | 425 | 1.3 | – |
| Total valid votes | | 33,539 | 100.0 | |

1968 Canadian federal election
| Party | Candidate | Votes | % |
|---|---|---|---|
| New Democratic | Lorne Nystrom | 13,212 | 38.9 |
| Progressive Conservative | James N. Ormiston | 10,699 | 31.5 |
| Liberal | Peter J. Konkin | 10,068 | 29.6 |
| Total valid votes | | 33,979 | 100.0 |

== See also ==
- List of Canadian electoral districts
- Historical federal electoral districts of Canada
