= Rosemary Brown (Canadian politician) =

Canadian politician (1930–2003)

The Honourable Rosemary Brown PC OC OBC CD

Member of the Legislative Assembly of British Columbia
- In office May 10, 1979 – October 22, 1986
- Preceded by: Raymond Loewen
- Succeeded by: David Mercier
- Constituency: Burnaby-Edmonds
- In office August 30, 1972 – May 10, 1979 Serving with Norman Levi
- Preceded by: Bert Price
- Succeeded by: Riding abolished
- Constituency: Vancouver-Burrard

Personal details
- Born: Rosemary Wedderburn; June 17, 1930 Kingston, Jamaica
- Died: April 26, 2003 (aged 72) Vancouver, British Columbia
- Party: New Democratic
- Education: McGill University (BA); University of British Columbia (MA)

Rosemary Brown PC OC OBC (née Wedderburn; June 17, 1930 – April 26, 2003) was a Canadian politician, social worker, and human rights advocate. As a member of the British Columbia Legislative Assembly from 1972 to 1986, she was the first black woman elected to a legislature in Canada at either the provincial or federal level. In 1975, she also became the first black woman to run for the leadership of a federal political party, finishing second in the New Democratic Party leadership race. Her work focused on anti-racism, gender equality, and expanding social supports for marginalized communities.

After leaving politics, Brown taught women's studies at Simon Fraser University and served as Chief Commissioner of the Ontario Human Rights Commission from 1993 to 1996. She also sat on the Federal Security Intelligence Review Committee and the Advisory Committee of the Order of Canada.

Brown received the Order of British Columbia in 1995 and was appointed an Officer of the Order of Canada in 1996.

== Early years ==
Rosemary Brown was born in Kingston, Jamaica, in 1930. She came to Canada in the year 1951 to attend university. She proceeded to earn a Master of Social Work at the University of British Columbia. As a student at McGill, and later the University of British Columbia, she faced pervasive discrimination. It was through adversity that she found her purpose as a leader against racism and sexism. She helped to found the British Columbia Association for the Advancement of Coloured People (BCAACP) in 1956 to help advocate for housing, employment and human rights legislation.

== Political history ==
Brown served as a Member of the Legislative Assembly (MLA) in the British Columbia legislature as a part of the New Democratic Party from 1972 to 1986, making her the first Black Canadian woman to be elected to a Canadian provincial legislature.

During that time, she advocated for Canadian minorities and changed the legislature to uphold equality. She worked on improving "services for the elderly, the disadvantaged, immigrants and people with disabilities" as well as prohibiting discrimination on the basis of race or sex.

In 1975, she became the first black woman to run for the leadership of a Canadian federal party (and only the second woman, after Mary Walker-Sawka), finishing a strong second (with 40.1% of the votes on the fourth and final ballot) to Ed Broadbent in that year's New Democratic Party leadership election.

After departing politics, she became a professor of women's studies at Simon Fraser University. In 1993, she was appointed Chief Commissioner of the Ontario Human Rights Commission and served until 1996.

Brown was sworn to the Queen's Privy Council for Canada as a member of the Federal Security Intelligence Review Committee, responsible for overseeing the actions of the Canadian Security Intelligence Service, a role which she held from 1993 to 1998. She also served on the Order of Canada Advisory Committee from 1999 until her death in 2003.

== Death ==
Brown died of a heart attack aged 72, in Vancouver, British Columbia, in 2003.

== Honours, awards, and legacy ==
=== Major national orders ===
These represent the highest civilian honours awarded by the federal and provincial governments in Canada:

- Order of British Columbia (provincial honour), 1995
- Order of Canada (national honour), 1996

=== Commonwealth and international honours ===
These honours reflect recognition beyond Canada, acknowledging Brown’s contributions to global human rights and justice:

- United Nations Human Rights Fellowship, 1973
- Government of Jamaica Commander of the Order of Distinction (Commonwealth honour), 2001

=== Major national awards ===
These awards recognize significant national-level service, activism, and leadership within Canada:

- Canadian Labour Congress Award for Outstanding Service to Humanity, 2002
- Queen Elizabeth II Golden Jubilee Medal (commemorative medal marking national contributions), 2002
- Harry Jerome Award (national Black achievement award)

=== Activism, leadership, and public service awards ===
These honours recognize Brown’s decades of work in civil rights, feminist advocacy, and community leadership:

- National Black Coalition Award (civil rights recognition), 1972
- Young Women’s Christian Association (YWCA) Woman of Distinction Award, 1989

=== Academic distinctions ===
Canadian universities recognized Brown’s intellectual, activist, and public leadership through multiple honorary degrees:

- Fifteen honorary doctorate degrees from Canadian universities

=== Legacy and commemoration ===
Brown’s legacy is reflected in public spaces, educational institutions, awards, and national recognition that commemorate her life and work:

- Canada Post stamp featuring Brown, released February 2, 2009
- Rosemary Brown Park, dedicated June 17, 2005, in her former Vancouver-Burrard riding
- Rosemary Brown Lane, named in 2017 in Vancouver’s West End
- Rosemary Brown Public School, named by the Durham District School Board, opened 2021
- Rosemary Brown Recreation Centre, Burnaby, completed April 2024; includes public artwork Gliding Edge by Jinn Anholt
- Rosemary Brown Award for Women (provincial gender-equity award), established 2004
- Recognized among "Canada’s Top 150" influential figures during the 2017 national sesquicentennial

== Bibliography ==
- Brown, Rosemary. Being Brown: A Very Public Life. Toronto: Random House, 1989.
