= Stephanie Petryk Potoski =

Canadian physician

- Stephanie Petryk Potoski, from a 1971 newspaper
- Born: November 10, 1916; Winnipeg, Manitoba, Canada
- Died: December 5, 1993 (age 77); Yorkton, Saskatchewan, Canada
- Occupations: Physician, clubwoman, politician

Stephanie Petryk Potoski (November 10, 1916 – December 5, 1993) was a Canadian physician and politician, and national president of the Ukrainian Catholic Women's League. She received the Pro Ecclesia et Pontifice award from Pope Paul VI in 1964.

== Early life and education ==
Petryk was born in Winnipeg, the daughter of Peter Petryk and Mary Huyda Petryk. Her parents were Ukrainian immigrants. She graduated from the University of Manitoba with a bachelor's degree, then stayed at Manitoba for her medical training, earning her medical degree in 1946. While she was a medical student, she served in the Royal Canadian Army Medical Corps.

== Career ==
Potoski was an anesthetist, and was said to have participated in the deliveries of over 2000 babies by 1972. She was elected a vice-president of the Federation of Medical Women of Canada in 1949. In 1954, she was the first woman elected an alderman in Yorkton, Saskatchewan. She was national president of the Ukrainian Catholic Women's League from 1959 to 1962, and from 1969 to 1974. In 1961, she attended the World Union of Catholic Women's Organizations in Rome. In 1964 she received the Pro Ecclesia et Pontifice Award from Pope Paul VI. She was a founding board member of the Multicultural Council of Canada, and served on the board of directors of the Canadian Broadcasting Corporation from 1964 to 1968. In 1972, she ran for the Canadian House of Commons seat in Yorkton–Melville.

In 1991, a biography of Potoski was published, to coincide with the Canadian Ukrainian Centennial that year.

== Personal life ==
Petryk married fellow physician Peter Potoski in 1946; the couple shared a medical practice. Her husband died in 1984, and she died in 1993, at the age of 77, in Yorkton.
