= Opinion polling for the 46th Canadian federal election by constituency =

The results of publicized opinion polling for individual constituencies in the lead up to the 46th Canadian federal election are detailed in this article.

Given the expense of polling individual constituencies, constituencies are usually only polled if they are of some particular interest, e.g. they are thought to be marginal or facing an impending by-election. The constituencies polled are not necessarily representative of a national average swing. Under the first-past-the-post electoral system the true marginal seats, by definition, will be decisive as to the outcome of the election.

== Constituency polls ==
=== Alberta ===
==== Edmonton Riverbend ====
Polling Firm	Last Date of Polling	Link	Liberal	Cons.	NDP	Green	PPC	Others	Undecided	Margin of Error^{[1]}	Sample Size^{[2]}	Polling Method^{[3]}
Liaison	November 30, 2025		45	50	2	1	1	1	N/A	±3.9 pp	614	IVR

=== British Columbia ===
==== North Vancouver—Capilano ====
Polling Firm	Last Date of Polling	Link	Liberal	Cons.	NDP	Green	PPC	Others	Undecided	Margin of Error^{[1]}	Sample Size^{[2]}	Polling Method^{[3]}
Liaison/Poliwave	August 19, 2025		46.8	30.3	11.9	10.8	0.2	N/A	N/A	±5.2 pp	528	IVR

==== Vancouver Kingsway ====
Polling Firm	Last Date of Polling	Link	Liberal	Cons.	NDP	Green	PPC	Others	Undecided	Margin of Error^{[1]}	Sample Size^{[2]}	Polling Method^{[3]}
Liaison	November 30, 2025		31	23	40	3	2	1	N/A	±4.01 pp	576	IVR

=== Nova Scotia ===
==== Acadie—Annapolis ====
Polling Firm	Last Date of Polling	Link	Liberal	Cons.	NDP	Green	PPC	Others	Undecided	Margin of Error^{[1]}	Sample Size^{[2]}	Polling Method^{[3]}
Liaison	November 30, 2025		52	37	5	3	2	1	N/A	±4.3 pp	513	IVR

=== Ontario ===
==== Beaches—East York ====
Polling Firm	Last Date of Polling	Link	Liberal	Cons.	NDP	Green	PPC	Others	Undecided	Margin of Error^{[1]}	Sample Size^{[2]}	Polling Method^{[3]}
Liaison/Poliwave	August 19, 2026		55.0	20.6	20.7	2.6	1.7	N/A	N/A	±5.1 pp	538	IVR
Mainstreet Research	March 13, 2026		60.6	15.2	10.8	2.7	N/A	1.7	8.9	±4.7 pp	440	Telephone

==== Eglinton—Lawrence ====
Polling Firm	Last Date of Polling	Link	Liberal	Cons.	NDP	Green	PPC	Others	Undecided	Margin of Error^{[1]}	Sample Size^{[2]}	Polling Method^{[3]}
Liaison	November 30, 2025		52	41	3	2	1	1	N/A	±3.99 pp	602	IVR

==== Scarborough Southwest ====
Polling Firm	Last Date of Polling	Link	Liberal	Cons.	NDP	Green	PPC	Others	Undecided	Margin of Error^{[1]}	Sample Size^{[2]}	Polling Method^{[3]}
Mainstreet Research	February 22, 2026		44	19	11	1	N/A	3	22	±4.5 pp	464	Telephone

=== Quebec ===
==== Chicoutimi—Le Fjord ====
Polling Firm	Last Date of Polling	Link	Liberal	Cons.	BQ	NDP	Green	PPC	Others	Undecided	Margin of Error^{[1]}	Sample Size^{[2]}	Polling Method^{[3]}	
Segma Research	August		40.3	16.8	37.8	3.1	0.5	1.5	Others	—N/a	—N/a	4.7	448	IVR
Liaison/Poliwave	August 19, 2026		39.9	15.4	35.1	6.1	3.1	0.4	—N/a	—N/a	4.7	536	IVR	
Pallas	July 18, 2026		28	26	30	—N/a	—N/a	—N/a	3	13	—N/a	317	IVR	

== See also ==
- Opinion polling for the 46th Canadian federal election

== Notes ==
Notes

^{1} In cases when linked poll details distinguish between the margin of error associated with the total sample of respondents (including undecided and non-voters) and that of the subsample of decided/leaning voters, the latter is included in the table. Also not included is the margin of error created by rounding to the nearest whole number or any margin of error from methodological sources. Most online polls—because of their opt-in method of recruiting panellists which results in a non-random sample—cannot have a margin of error. In such cases, shown is what the margin of error would be for a survey using a random probability-based sample of equivalent size.
^{2} Refers to the total sample size, including undecided and non-voters.
^{3} "Telephone" refers to traditional telephone polls conducted by live interviewers; "IVR" refers to automated Interactive Voice Response polls conducted by telephone; "online" refers to polls conducted exclusively over the internet; "telephone/online" refers to polls which combine results from both telephone and online surveys, or for which respondents are initially recruited by telephone and then asked to complete an online survey.
