= Opinion polling for the 46th Canadian federal election =

This table provides a list of scientific, nationwide public opinion polls conducted from the 2025 Canadian federal election leading up to the 46th Canadian federal election.

== National polls ==
=== Graphical summary ===
Opinion polling for the 46th Canadian federal election (LOESS diagram)

=== Table of polls ===
Polling firm	Last date of polling (Note: Polls that share the same last date of polling are ordered from earliest (below) to latest (above) first date of polling. Polls that have identical field dates are placed in the order in which they were published (earliest below, latest above).)	Link	LPC	CPC	BQ	NDP	GPC	PPC	Others (Note: Support for other parties may include the People's Party of Canada depending on the poll.)	Margin of error (Note: In cases when linked poll details distinguish between the margin of error associated with the total sample of respondents (including undecided and non-voters) and that of the subsample of decided/leaning voters, the former is included in the table. Also not included is the margin of error created by rounding to the nearest whole number or any margin of error from methodological sources. Most online polls (because of their opt-in method of recruiting panelists which results in a non-random sample) cannot have a margin of error. In such cases, shown is what the margin of error would be for a survey using a random probability-based sample of equivalent size.)	Sample size (Note: Refers to the total, "raw" sample size, including undecided and non-voters, and before demographic weighting is applied. Fractions in parentheses apply to rolling polls (see below) and indicate the proportion of the sample that is independent from the previous poll in the series.)	Polling method (Note: "Telephone" refers to traditional telephone polls conducted by live interviewers; "IVR" refers to automated interactive voice response polls conducted by telephone; "online" refers to polls conducted exclusively over the internet; "telephone/online" refers to polls which combine results from both telephone and online surveys, or for which respondents are initially recruited by telephone and then asked to complete an online survey. "Rolling" polls contain overlapping data from one poll to the next.)	Lead
Léger	November 16, 2026		47	36	7	6	3	—	1	±2.5 pp	1,522	Online	11
Liaison Strategies	November 14, 2026		45	30	6	14	2	1	1	±3.1 pp	1,000 (1/2)	IVR	15
	November 14, 2026		Mike Morrice wins the 2026 Green Party leadership election.										
Nanos Research	November 13, 2026		45.4	28.6	6.1	10.3	6.5	3.0	—	±3.1 pp	1,019 (1/4)	Telephone	16.8
Ipsos	November 12, 2026		45	35	6	9	1	1	1	±3.1 pp	1,002	Online	10
Liaison Strategies	November 7, 2026		44	31	5	14	3	2	2	±3.1 pp	1,000 (1/2)	IVR	13
Angus Reid	November 6, 2026		43	34	5	12	3	—	3	±2.0 pp	1,634	Online	9
Nanos Research	November 6, 2026		44.2	27.7	8.2	12.5	5.0	2.4	—	±3.1 pp	1,000 (1/4)	Telephone	16.5
Pollara	November 5, 2026		49	35	6	8	—	—	3	±1.5 pp	4,330	Online	14
Research Co	November 4, 2026		47	28	6	11	4	2	1	±3.1 pp	1,001	Online	19
Abacus Data	November 4, 2026		45	34	8	9	3	2	0	±2.2 pp	1,926	Online	11
Liaison Strategies	October 31, 2026		45	30	6	14	2	2	1	±3.1 pp	1,000 (1/2)	IVR	15
Nanos Research	October 30, 2026		45.4	28.9	7.4	12.9	2.7	1.9	—	±3.1 pp	1,014 (1/4)	Telephone	16.5
Liaison Strategies	October 24, 2026		44	31	6	14	3	2	1	±3.1 pp	1,000 (1/2)	IVR	13
Nanos Research	October 23, 2026		47.3	27.8	7.5	12.9	2.3	2.0	—	±3.1 pp	1,019 (1/4)	Telephone	19.5
Abacus Data	October 21, 2026		48	32	6	9	3	1	1	±2.5 pp	1,500	Online	16
Liaison Strategies	October 17, 2026		45	30	6	14	2	2	1	±3.1 pp	1,000 (1/2)	IVR	15
Nanos Research	October 16, 2026		50.6	28.3	6.2	11.5	2.2	1.6	—	±3.1 pp	1,016 (1/4)	Telephone	22.3
Abacus Data	October 13, 2026		46	34	7	9	3	1	0	±1.7 pp	3,197	Online	12
Léger	October 12, 2026		48	33	6	8	3	—	2	±2.5 pp	1,525	Online	15
Liaison Strategies	October 10, 2026		45	29	6	15	2	2	1	±2.8 pp	1,263 (1/2)	IVR	16
Nanos Research	October 9, 2026		48.8	29.5	6.4	11.1	2.1	1.6	—	±3.1 pp	1,034 (1/4)	Telephone	19.3
Liaison Strategies	October 3, 2026		46	28	6	15	2	2	1	±2.5 pp	1,526 (1/2)	IVR	18
Ekos	October 2, 2026		47.2	26.4	4.6	15.3	3.2	1.8	1.4	±1.7 pp	2,020	Telephone	20.8
Nanos Research	October 2, 2026		49.1	28.2	6.3	10.9	3.4	1.6	—	±3.1 pp	1,020 (1/4)	Telephone	20.9
Liaison Strategies	September 26, 2026		46	29	6	15	2	2	1	±2.5 pp	1,526 (1/2)	IVR	17
Nanos Research	September 25, 2026		49.9	27.9	5.6	11.0	3.5	1.4	—	±3.1 pp	1,022 (1/4)	Telephone	22.0
Abacus Data	September 23, 2026		46	34	7	9	2	1	1	±1.87 pp	2,774	Online	12
Liaison Strategies	September 19, 2026		45	31	6	15	2	1	1	±2.5 pp	1,526 (1/2)	IVR	14
Nanos Research	September 18, 2026		48.1	31.0	4.8	11.2	3.3	1.0	—	±3.1 pp	1,026 (1/4)	Telephone	17.1
Liaison Strategies	September 12, 2026		44	32	6	14	2	2	1	±2.5 pp	1,526 (1/2)	IVR	12
Nanos Research	September 11, 2026		48.3	30.9	4.9	10.9	3.2	1.4	—	±3.1 pp	1,014 (1/4)	Telephone	17.4
Abacus Data	September 9, 2026		47	33	7	8	3	1	1	±2.54 pp	1,479	Online	14
Léger	September 7, 2026		49	33	7	6	3	—	2	±2.5 pp	1,538	Online	16
Angus Reid	September 7, 2026		46	32	5	12	2	—	2	±2.0 pp	1,811	Online	14
Liaison Strategies	September 5, 2026		45	31	6	13	2	2	1	±2.5 pp	1,526 (1/2)	IVR	14
Nanos Research	September 4, 2026		47.3	31.3	5.0	10.8	3.4	1.6	—	±3.1 pp	1,020 (1/4)	Telephone	16.0
	August 31, 2026	By-elections in North Vancouver—Capilano, Chicoutimi—Le Fjord, and Beaches—East York result in two Liberal holds and one gain.											
Liaison Strategies	August 29, 2026		46	29	6	13	3	2	1	±2.5 pp	1,526 (1/2)	IVR	17
Nanos Research	August 28, 2026		43.7	32.6	6.0	12.0	3.9	1.4	—	±3.1 pp	1,017 (1/4)	Telephone	11
Ipsos	August 27, 2026		44	33	8	10	2	2	1	±3.8 pp	1,001	Online	11
Abacus Data	August 26, 2026		45	35	7	9	2	1	1	±2.2 pp	2,022	Online	10
Liaison Strategies	August 22, 2026		43	32	6	13	3	2	1	±2.5 pp	1,526 (1/2)	IVR	11
Nanos Research	August 21, 2026		44.1	30	6.6	12.9	4	2	—	±3.1 pp	1,022 (1/4)	Telephone	14.1
Liaison Strategies	August 15, 2026		43	32	6	13	3	2	1	±2.5 pp	1,526 (1/2)	IVR	11
Nanos Research	August 14, 2026		45.7	28.5	6.2	13.7	4.0	1.5	—	±3.1 pp	1,031 (1/4)	Telephone	17.2
Abacus Data	August 12, 2026		42	35	8	10	4	2	0	±2.5 pp	1,499	Online	7
Liaison Strategies	August 8, 2026		44	31	6	13	3	2	1	±2.5 pp	1,526 (1/2)	IVR	13
Nanos Research	August 7, 2026		45.6	29.1	6.8	12.9	4.0	1.3	—	±3.1 pp	1,038 (1/4)	Telephone	16.5
Research Co.	August 7, 2026		47	27	6	10	5	4	1	±3.1 pp	1,001	Online	20
Ekos	August 4, 2026		44.7	27.1	4.4	17.0	3.5	2.2	1.0	±1.7 pp	3,195	Telephone	17.6
Léger	August 3, 2026		46	34	6	8	4	–	2	±2.5 pp	1,514	Online	12
Liaison Strategies	August 1, 2026		43	34	6	12	2	2	1	±2.5 pp	1,526 (1/2)	IVR	9
Nanos Research	July 31, 2026		47.1	27.9	6.1	12.7	3.8	1.9	—	±3.1 pp	1,037 (1/4)	Telephone	19.2
Abacus Data	July 29, 2026		44	38	6	9	3	1	0	±2.24 pp	1,910	Online	6
Angus Reid	July 27, 2026		40	36	6	13	3	1	2	±2.3 pp	1,769	Online	4
Liaison Strategies	July 25, 2026		44	35	5	11	2	1	2	±2.5 pp	1,526 (1/2)	IVR	9
Nanos Research	July 24, 2026		44.7	29.5	7.3	12.7	4.5	1.1	—	±3.1 pp	1,034 (1/4)	Telephone	15.2
Liaison Strategies	July 18, 2026		43	35	5	10	1	1	0	±2.5 pp	1,526 (1/2)	IVR	8
Nanos Research	July 17, 2026		42.7	31.3	7.2	13.6	4.3	0.8	—	±3.1 pp	1,022 (1/4)	Telephone	11.4
Abacus Data	July 16, 2026		43	37	7	9	3	1	0	±1.5 pp	4,205	Online	6
Liaison Strategies	July 11, 2026		41	35	6	14	2	1	1	±2.5 pp	1,526 (1/2)	IVR	6
Nanos Research	July 10, 2026		43.0	31.0	6.2	15.1	3.7	1.0	—	±3.1 pp	1,018 (1/4)	Telephone	12.0
Liaison Strategies	July 4, 2026		43	34	6	14	2	1	1	±2.5 pp	1,458 (1/2)	IVR	9
Nanos Research	July 3, 2026		41.4	32.1	6.4	15.1	3.8	1.1	—	±3.1 pp	1,017 (1/4)	Telephone	9.3
Abacus Data	July 2, 2026		44	36	7	8	2	2	0	±2.02 pp	2,366	Online	8
Liaison Strategies	June 27, 2026		42	34	5	11	2	1	1	±2.5 pp	1,526 (1/2)	IVR	8
Nanos Research	June 26, 2026		43.8	30.4	6.5	12.0	5.2	2.1	—	±3.1 pp	1,017 (1/4)	Telephone	13.0
Léger	June 22, 2026		48	34	6	6	4	–	2	±2.5 pp	1,528	Online	14
Liaison Strategies	June 20, 2026		43	32	6	14	2	2	2	±2.5 pp	1,526 (1/2)	IVR	11
Nanos Research	June 19, 2026		43.5	31.5	6.6	11.4	4.8	2.0	—N/a	±3.1 pp	1,024 (1/4)	Telephone	12.0
Abacus Data	June 17, 2026		45	37	6	9	2	1	1	±1.8 pp	3,080	Online	8
Liaison Strategies	June 13, 2026		41	32	6	14	2	2	2	±2.50 pp	1,526 (1/2)	IVR	9
Mainstreet Research	June 13, 2026		43.1	32.8	5.3	12.3	3.6	1.6	1.3	±2.7 pp	1,349	IVR	10.3
Nanos Research	June 12, 2026		42.7	30.7	6.7	11.5	5.9	2.1	—N/a	±3.1 pp	1,021 (1/4)	Telephone	12.0
Angus Reid	June 10, 2026		41	36	7	12	2	—N/a	1	±2 pp	4,237	Online	5
Liaison Strategies	June 6, 2026		40	32	7	15	3	2	2	±2.51 pp	1,526 (1/2)	IVR	8
Nanos Research	June 5, 2026		42.3	29.4	6.7	13.1	6.0	2.0	—N/a	±3.1 pp	1,023 (1/4)	Telephone	12.9
Abacus Data	June 2, 2026		44	36	6	11	3	1	0	±2.2 pp	1,910	Online	8
Léger	June 1, 2026		50	34	6	6	2	—N/a	1	±2.5 pp	1,532	Online	16
Liaison Strategies	May 31, 2026		41	32	6	16	2	2	2	±2.51 pp	1,526 (1/2)	IVR	9
Nanos Research	May 29, 2026		40.3	32.8	6.6	13.2	5.1	1.5	—N/a	±3.1 pp	1,028 (1/4)	Telephone	7.5
Pallas Data	May 24, 2026		45	32	7	11	3	—N/a	2	±2.7 pp	1,295	IVR	13
Liaison Strategies	May 23, 2026		43	31	6	11	2	3	3	±2.51 pp	1,526 (1/2)	IVR	12
Nanos Research	May 22, 2026		41.1	32.7	6.4	12.6	4.8	2.0	—N/a	±3.1 pp	1,026 (1/4)	Telephone	8.4
Abacus Data	May 20, 2026		47	35	6	8	2	1	—N/a	±2.23 pp	1,920	Online	12
Liaison Strategies	May 16, 2026		43	34	6	11	2	2	2	±2.51 pp	1,526 (1/2)	IVR	9
Nanos Research	May 15, 2026		42.3	32.7	5.8	12.0	4.4	1.9	—N/a	±3.1 pp	1,035 (1/4)	Telephone	9.6
Liaison Strategies	May 9, 2026		44	33	6	10	2	2	2	±2.51 pp	1,526 (1/2)	IVR	11
Nanos Research	May 8, 2026		45.5	33.4	5.3	8.8	3.5	2.0	—N/a	±3.1 pp	1,036 (1/4)	Telephone	12.1
Research Co.	May 8, 2026		46	31	7	11	3	1	1	±3.1 pp	1,003	Online	15
Abacus Data	May 5, 2026		46	36	6	8	3	1	0	±2.0 pp	2,478	Online	10
Liaison Strategies	May 2, 2026		45	33	6	9	2	2	3	±3.1 pp	1,000 (1/2)	IVR	12
Nanos Research	May 1, 2026		44.8	32.0	5.6	11.4	3.4	1.4	—N/a	±3.1 pp	1,027 (1/4)	Telephone	12.8
Léger	April 26, 2026		48	37	6	6	2	—N/a	1	±2.51 pp	1,521	Online	11
Liaison Strategies	April 25, 2026		45	34	6	9	3	2	2	±3.1 pp	1,000 (1/2)	IVR	11
Ekos	April 24, 2026		44.5	31.0	5.8	12.5	3.0	2.0	1.0	±2.2 pp	1,916	IVR	13.5
Nanos Research	April 24, 2026		44.6	32.0	5.4	11.5	3.5	1.1	—N/a	±3.1 pp	1,024 (1/4)	Telephone	12.6
Abacus Data	April 22, 2026		45	36	7	8	2	1	1	±2.2 pp	2,000	Online	9
Angus Reid	April 20, 2026		42	35	7	12	2	-	1	±2 pp	2,013	Online	7
Liaison Strategies	April 18, 2026		45	33	6	10	3	2	2	±3.1 pp	1,000 (1/2)	IVR	12
Nanos Research	April 17, 2026		45.8	31.5	5.3	11.9	3.5	0.9	—N/a	±3.1 pp	1,022 (1/4)	Telephone	14.3
	April 13, 2026	By-elections in Scarborough Southwest, University—Rosedale and Terrebonne result in three Liberal holds and a Liberal majority government.											
Liaison Strategies	April 11, 2026		43	33	7	10	3	2	2	±3.1 pp	1,000 (1/2)	IVR	10
Nanos Research	April 10, 2026		45.3	32.0	5.4	12.2	3.5	1.0	—N/a	±3.1 pp	1,027 (1/4)	Telephone	13.3
Spark Insights	April 8, 2026		46	32	6	9	—N/a	—N/a	8	—N/a	4,026	Online	14
Abacus Data	April 8, 2026		44	38	6	8	3	1	1	±2.39 pp	1,680	Online	6
Ipsos	April 7, 2026		45	33	7	9	2	2	0	±3.8 pp	1,000	Online	12
Liaison Strategies	April 4, 2026		44	33	6	9	3	2	2	±3.1 pp	1,000 (1/2)	IVR	11
Nanos Research	April 3, 2026		45.7	30.5	5.6	12.5	4.2	1.1	—N/a	±3.1 pp	1,025 (1/4)	Telephone	15.2
Léger	March 30, 2026		48	34	7	6	3	—N/a	1	±2.44 pp	1,618	Online	14
	March 29, 2026	Avi Lewis is elected as leader of the New Democratic Party.											
Liaison Strategies	March 28, 2026		45	33	6	9	2	2	2	±3.1 pp	1,000 (1/2)	IVR	12
Nanos Research	March 27, 2026		46.5	32.2	5.1	11.3	3.6	1.1	—N/a	±3.1 pp	1,029 (1/4)	Telephone	14.3
Spark Insights	March 26, 2026		46	30	5	11	—N/a	—N/a	8	—N/a	4,000	Online	16
Abacus Data	March 24, 2026		44	37	6	9	3	1	0	±2.51 pp	1,515	Online	7
Liaison Strategies	March 21, 2026		46	32	7	9	3	2	2	±3.1 pp	1,000 (1/2)	IVR	14
Nanos Research	March 20, 2026		45.7	32.9	4.8	11.5	3.7	0.8	—N/a	±3.1 pp	1,024 (1/4)	Telephone	12.8
Angus Reid	March 17, 2026		44	36	7	9	2	—N/a	1	±1.5 pp	4,005	Online	8
Ekos	March 15, 2026		47.5	27.0	4.1	15.1	4.5	1.5	0.4	±3.0 pp	1,047	Online	20.5
Liaison Strategies	March 14, 2026		45	31	6	8	3	4	4	±3.1 pp	1,000 (1/2)	IVR	14
Nanos Research	March 13, 2026		47.8	31.1	4.5	11.2	4.0	1.1	—N/a	±3.1 pp	1,015 (1/4)	Telephone	16.7
Abacus Data	March 11, 2026		46	35	7	7	3	1	0	±2.2 pp	1,931	Online	11
Liaison Strategies	March 7, 2026		44	30	6	9	3	4	3	±3.1 pp	1,000 (1/2)	IVR	14
Spark Insights	March 6, 2026		46	31	5	10	—N/a	—N/a	8	—N/a	3,055	Online	15
Nanos Research	March 6, 2026		46.0	32.5	5.2	10.0	4.7	0.7	—N/a	±3.1 pp	1,023 (1/4)	Telephone	13.5
Mainstreet Research	March 2, 2026		46	36	4	7	2	3	2	±2.7 pp	1,276	IVR	10
Léger	March 2, 2026		49	35	5	5	3	—N/a	2	±2.43 pp	1,627	Online	14
Liaison Strategies	February 28, 2026		43	33	6	9	3	2	2	±3.1 pp	1,000 (1/2)	IVR	10
Nanos Research	February 27, 2026		43.6	33.2	5.1	11.4	4.9	0.7	—N/a	±3.1 pp	1,015 (1/4)	Telephone	10.4
Ipsos	February 26, 2026		44	36	7	8	3	1	0	±3.8 pp	1,001	Online	8
Pollara	February 24, 2026		47	34	7	9	—N/a	—N/a	3	±2.0 pp	2,410	Online	13
Abacus Data	February 23, 2026		44	38	6	7	3	1	0	±2.53 pp	1,500	Online	6
Angus Reid	February 23, 2026		45	32	7	10	4	—N/a	2	±2 pp	1,650	Online	13
Liaison Strategies	February 21, 2026		45	33	6	10	2	2	2	±3.1 pp	1,000 (1/2)	IVR	12
Nanos Research	February 20, 2026		41.3	33.7	7.6	10.6	4.9	0.9	—N/a	±3.1 pp	1,021 (1/4)	Telephone	7.6
Innovative Research	February 17, 2026		44	37	6	8	3	—N/a	3	—N/a	1,838	Online	7
Liaison Strategies	February 14, 2026		43	34	6	9	3	2	2	±3.1 pp	1,000 (1/2)	IVR	9
Nanos Research	February 13, 2026		38.1	36.5	8.3	11.1	4.4	0.7	—N/a	±3.1 pp	1,018 (1/4)	Telephone	1.6
Abacus Data	February 10, 2026		44	37	6	8	3	1	0	±2.0 pp	1,915	Online	7
Liaison Strategies	February 7, 2026		42	35	7	9	3	2	2	±3.1 pp	1,000 (1/2)	IVR	7
Nanos Research	February 6, 2026		39.1	35.2	8.8	12.6	2.9	0.9	—N/a	±3.0 pp	1,049 (1/4)	Telephone	3.9
Research Co.	February 5, 2026		45	32	7	10	3	2	1	±3.1 pp	1,001	Online	13
Innovative Research	February 2, 2026		40	38	7	10	3	—N/a	2	—N/a	1,666	Online	2
Mainstreet Research	February 2, 2026		51	35.5	5.5	4	2.2	0.6	1.1	±2.7 pp	1,276	IVR	15.5
Liaison Strategies	January 31, 2026		43	35	7	8	3	2	2	±3.1 pp	1,000 (1/2)	IVR	8
Ekos	January 30, 2026		44.4	29.5	5.3	13.8	3.9	1.6	1.5	±2.6 pp	1,453	Online	14.9
Nanos Research	January 30, 2026		38.9	35.2	9.2	12.5	2.5	1.3	—N/a	±3.0 pp	1,055 (1/4)	Telephone	3.7
Abacus Data	January 27, 2026		43	39	6	8	2	2	1	±2.0 pp	2,498	Online	4
Léger	January 26, 2026		47	38	6	5	2	—N/a	1	±2.44 pp	1,611	Online	9
Angus Reid	January 26, 2026		41	38	7	10	2	—N/a	2	±2.6 pp	1,420	Online	3
Liaison Strategies	January 24, 2026		42	34	8	10	3	2	2	±3.1 pp	1,000 (1/2)	IVR	8
Nanos Research	January 23, 2026		39.2	35.2	8.0	11.6	3.6	2.1	—N/a	±3.0 pp	1,053 (1/4)	Telephone	4.0
Liaison Strategies	January 17, 2026		40	35	8	11	3	1	2	±3.1 pp	1,000 (1/2)	IVR	5
Abacus Data	January 16, 2026		41	39	7	8	3	2	1	±2.2 pp	2,008	Online	2
Nanos Research	January 16, 2026		38.8	34.8	7.7	11.5	4.6	2.4	—N/a	±3.0 pp	1,084 (1/4)	Telephone	4.0
Abacus Data	January 14, 2026		40	40	7	8	3	1	1	±2.28 pp	1,850	Online	Tie
Pallas Data	January 12, 2026		40	37	7	11	3	—N/a	2	±2.9 pp	1,120	IVR	3
Liaison Strategies	January 10, 2026		39	36	8	12	3	1	2	±3.09 pp	1,000 (1/2)	IVR	3
Nanos Research	January 9, 2026		38.8	35.5	7.6	10.9	3.9	2.1	—N/a	±3.0 pp	1,054 (1/4)	Telephone	3.3
Liaison Strategies	January 3, 2026		38	37	7	12	3	1	2	±3.09 pp	1,000 (1/2)	IVR	1
Nanos Research	January 2, 2026		37.7	35.5	7.6	11.7	3.9	1.9	—N/a	±3.0 pp	1,059 (1/4)	Telephone	2.2
Liaison Strategies	December 28, 2025		39	37	7	11	3	2	1	±3.09 pp	1,000 (1/2)	IVR	2
Nanos Research	December 26, 2025		38.4	34.7	7.4	11.3	3.9	1.7	—N/a	±3.0 pp	1,054 (1/4)	Telephone	3.7
Liaison Strategies	December 21, 2025		38	38	7	12	3	2	1	±3.09 pp	1,000 (1/2)	IVR	Tie
Nanos Research	December 19, 2025		36.3	35.6	7.1	11.4	3.5	1.8	—N/a	±3.0 pp	1,059 (1/4)	Telephone	0.7
Pallas Data	December 15, 2025		40.9	37.7	8.2	7.9	3.6	—N/a	1.7	±3 pp	1,074	IVR	3.2
Ipsos	December 15, 2025		40	37	9	9	2	2		±3.1 pp	1,502	Online	3
Innovative Research	December 14, 2025		39	39	7	10	4	—N/a	2	—N/a	2,159	Online	Tie
Mainstreet Research	December 12, 2025		41	42	7	6	1	1	1	±3.0 pp	1,098	IVR	1
Nanos Research	December 12, 2025		38.5	36.0	6.7	10.8	3.7	1.9	—N/a	±3.0 pp	1,084 (1/4)	Telephone	2.5
Abacus Data	December 9, 2025		41	41	6	9	2	1	0	±2.53 pp	1,500	Online	Tie
Nanos Research	December 5, 2025		39.1	37.8	6.3	9.5	3.3	1.8	—N/a	±3.0 pp	1,042 (1/4)	Telephone	1.3
Innovative Research	December 1, 2025		39	38	8	9	4	—N/a	2	—N/a	1,846	Online	1
Abacus Data	December 1, 2025		41	41	7	7	2	1	1	±2.3 pp	1,802	Online	Tie
Angus Reid	December 1, 2025		40	37	9	10	3	—N/a	—N/a	±1.5 pp	4,025	Online	3
Léger	November 30, 2025		43	36	9	8	4	—N/a	1	±2.47 pp	1,579	Online	7
Liaison Strategies	November 30, 2025		41	36	5	12	2	2	1	±3.09 pp	1,000 (1/2)	IVR	5
Nanos Research	November 28, 2025		41.9	38.2	7.3	8.4	2.7	1.2	0.3	±3.0 pp	1,084 (1/4)	Telephone	3.7
Abacus Data	November 27, 2025		41	40	7	8	2	1	1	±2 pp	2,421	Online	1
Nanos Research	November 21, 2025		41.9	37.2	7.0	9.1	2.7	1.6	0.5	±3.0 pp	1,053 (1/4)	Telephone	4.7
Kolosowski Strategies	November 18, 2025		44	44	6	3	1	1	0	±3.2 pp	890	Online	Tie
Nanos Research	November 14, 2025		40.2	38.2	7.4	10.1	2.2	1.3	0.8	±3.0 pp	1,060 (1/4)	Telephone	2.0
Ekos	November 11, 2025		44.1	33.2	5.4	10.7	3.3	1.8	1.4	±2.8 pp	1,191	IVR	10.9
Mainstreet Research	November 8, 2025		44	40	6	5	2	2	2	±3.0 pp	1,084	IVR	4
Liaison Strategies	November 8, 2025		44	36	6	10	2	1	1	±3.09 pp	1,000 (1/2)	IVR	8
Angus Reid	November 7, 2025		40	38	8	9	3	—N/a	—N/a	±1.5 pp	2,038	Online	2
Nanos Research	November 7, 2025		40.0	36.8	7.5	11.4	2.3	1.2	0.8	±2.9 pp	1,122 (1/4)	Telephone	3.2
Abacus Data	November 6, 2025		40	41	7	8	2	1	0	±2.23 pp	1,916	Online	1
Ekos	November 4, 2025		43.4	35.5	5.8	8.0	3.5	2.0	2.0	±2.8 pp	1,199	IVR	7.9
Liaison Strategies	November 4, 2025		42	38	5	11	2	1	1	±3.1 pp	1,000 (1/2)	IVR	4
Léger	November 3, 2025		43	38	7	7	4	—N/a	1	±2.5 pp	1,585	Online	5
Nanos Research	October 31, 2025		39.3	37.1	6.6	12.5	1.7	1.5	0	±3.0 pp	924 (1/4)	Telephone	2.2
Abacus Data	October 29, 2025		40	42	6	8	3	1	1	±1.8 pp	2,922	Online	2
Nanos Research	October 24, 2025		39.4	37.0	7.0	12.7	1.6	1.2	0	±3.0 pp	1,060 (1/4)	Telephone	2.4
Ekos	October 24, 2025		43.5	32.4	5.7	12.4	3.0	2.0	1.0	±2.8 pp	1,199	Online	11.1
Nanos Research	October 17, 2025		39.3	36.6	6.8	12.1	2.8	1.3	1.1	±3.1 pp	1,021 (1/4)	Telephone	2.7
Abacus Data	October 15, 2025		40	41	7	8	3	1	1	±1.5 pp	4,501	Online	1
Pallas Data	October 15, 2025		41	37	6	11	2	2	0	±2.8 pp	1,206	Online	4
Nanos Research	October 10, 2025		38.5	36.8	6.5	12.2	3.9	1.4	0.7	±3.1 pp	1,002 (1/4)	Telephone	1.7
Léger	October 5, 2025		44	38	7	6	3	—N/a	2	±2.5 pp	1,562	Online	6
Nanos Research	October 3, 2025		39.1	37.9	6.2	11.5	4.0	0.9	0.4	±3.1 pp	1,027 (1/4)	Telephone	1.2
Abacus Data	October 1, 2025		40	41	7	7	3	2	1	±2.5 pp	1,504	Online	1
Nanos Research	September 26, 2025		40.7	36.6	4.8	11.9	4.3	1.2	0.5	±3.1 pp	1,030 (1/4)	Telephone	4.1
Angus Reid	September 22, 2025		38	41	8	10	2	1	1	±2 pp	1,570	Online	3
Liaison Strategies	September 21, 2025		43	37	5	10	2	2	1	±3.1 pp	1,000 (1/2)	IVR	6
Nanos Research	September 19, 2025		40.6	35.7	5.5	11.6	3.2	2.2	1.2	±3.0 pp	1,056 (1/4)	Telephone	4.9
Abacus Data	September 17, 2025		40	40	7	8	3	1	1	±2.1 pp	2,230	Online	Tie
Research Co.	September 12, 2025		43	38	6	8	2	1	1	±3.1 pp	1,003	Telephone	5
Nanos Research	September 12, 2025		41.8	34.5	5.5	12.8	2.5	1.9	1.0	±3.0 pp	1,049 (1/4)	Telephone	7.3
Ekos	September 12, 2025		42.0	34.0	5.2	12.6	3.0	2.0	1.0	±2.4 pp	1,614	Online	8.0
Ipsos	September 8, 2025		43	39	7	7	1	2	0	±3.8 pp	1,001	Online	4
Léger	September 7, 2025		47	38	6	6	2	—N/a	1	±2.5 pp	1,592	Online	9
Nanos Research	September 5, 2025		42.7	32.9	5.2	12.8	3.5	1.6	1.3	±3.1 pp	1,002 (1/4)	Telephone	9.8
Angus Reid	September 4, 2025		38	40	8	10	2	1	2	±1.5 pp	3,656	Online	2
Abacus Data	September 2, 2025		43	40	7	6	2	1	1	±2.5 pp	1,500	Online	3
Mainstreet Research	September 1, 2025		42.3	40.4	5.0	8.4	1.2	1.6	1.3	±3.1 pp	1,008	IVR	1.9
Nanos Research	August 29, 2025		43.3	32.4	6.2	12.7	2.9	1.6	0.9	±3.1 pp	1,009 (1/4)	Telephone	10.9
Liaison Strategies	August 27, 2025		44	35	5	10	2	2	1	±3.1 pp	1,000 (1/2)	IVR	9
Nanos Research	August 22, 2025		43.7	34.2	5.5	10.7	3.3	1.6	0.8	±3.0 pp	1,045 (1/4)	Telephone	9.5
	August 19, 2025	Elizabeth May announces her intention to resign as leader of the Green Party.											
Abacus Data	August 19, 2025		39	41	7	7	2	2	—N/a	±2.2 pp	1,915	Online	2
	August 18, 2025	A federal by-election was held in Battle River—Crowfoot. Conservative Party Leader Pierre Poilievre held the seat for the CPC.											
Nanos Research	August 15, 2025		44.4	32.4	4.9	11.6	3.2	2.8	0.7	±3.0 pp	1,050 (1/4)	Telephone	12.0
Nanos Research	August 8, 2025		44.8	31.9	6.1	11.5	2.6	2.5	0.6	±3.0 pp	1,094 (1/4)	Telephone	12.9
Liaison Strategies	August 8, 2025		44	35	6	11	3	1	1	±3.1 pp	1,000 (1/2)	IVR	9
Abacus Data	August 7, 2025		43	40	6	8	1.5	1.5	—N/a	±2.4 pp	1,686	Online	3
Léger	August 4, 2025		46	36	7	6	3	—N/a	1	±2.4 pp	1,617	Online	10
Pallas Data	August 1, 2025		43.2	37.6	6.3	7.5	2.2	—N/a	3.2	±2.7 pp	1,301	IVR	5.6
Nanos Research	August 1, 2025		43.7	32.5	5.3	12.0	2.5	3.0	1.0	±3.0 pp	1,096 (1/4)	Telephone	11.2
Innovative Research	July 28, 2025		41	39	7	9	4	—N/a	2	—N/a	3,732	Online	2
Liaison Strategies	July 25, 2025		43	36	6	10	3	1	1	—N/a	—N/a	IVR	7
Nanos Research	July 25, 2025		43.6	33.5	5.9	12.1	2.3	1.8	0.8	±3.1 pp	1,027 (1/4)	Telephone	10.1
Nanos Research	July 18, 2025		44.3	34.0	6.6	10.3	2.3	2.0	0.5	±3.1 pp	1,026 (1/4)	Telephone	10.3
Abacus Data	July 15, 2025		43	40	6	7	3	1	1	±2.2 pp	1,915	Online	3
Ekos	July 14, 2025		43.2	30.5	5.5	13.0	3.5	3.6	1.0	±2.3 pp	1,817	Online	12.7
Nanos Research	July 11, 2025		44.5	33.8	5.9	11.1	2.1	1.9	0.7	±3.0 pp	1,047 (1/4)	Telephone	10.7
Léger	July 6, 2025		48	35	6	7	3	—N/a	1	±2.5 pp	1,546	Online	13
Liaison Strategies	July 4, 2025		46	35	6	9	2	1	1	—N/a	—N/a	IVR	11
Nanos Research	July 4, 2025		45.1	32.6	6.2	11.5	1.8	1.8	1.0	±3.0 pp	1,056 (1/4)	Telephone	12.5
Research Co.	July 2, 2025		47	37	6	6	2	1	1	±3.1 pp	1,001	Online	10
Abacus Data	July 2, 2025		41	40	7	9	2	2	0	±2.5 pp	1,500	Online	1
Innovative Research	June 30, 2025		43	38	6	8	3	—N/a	2	—N/a	4,029	Online	5
Nanos Research	June 27, 2025		44.5	31.4	5.9	12.8	2.5	1.7	1.2	±3.0 pp	1,076 (1/4)	Telephone	13.1
Mainstreet Research	June 26, 2025		47	38	3	6	3	1	2	±2.9 pp	1,168	IVR	9
Liaison Strategies	June 20, 2025		42	38	6	11	3	1	1	—N/a	—N/a	IVR	4
Nanos Research	June 20, 2025		45.2	30.8	6.1	12.2	2.9	1.5	1.3	±3.0 pp	1,090 (1/4)	Telephone	14.4
Abacus Data	June 19, 2025		42	39	6	7	3	1	1	±1.9 pp	1,500	Online	3
Nanos Research	June 13, 2025		44.2	32.2	6.3	11.4	3.2	1.7	1.0	±3.0 pp	1,080 (1/4)	Telephone	12.0
Liaison Strategies	June 6, 2025		42	39	6	9	2	1	1	—N/a	—N/a	IVR	3
Nanos Research	June 6, 2025		42.6	32.8	6.5	12.0	3.9	1.3	0.9	±3.0 pp	1,079 (1/4)	Telephone	9.8
Abacus Data	June 5, 2025		42	39	6	8	3	1	0	±1.9 pp	2,585	Online	3
Ekos	June 4, 2025		43.9	32.0	5.2	12.7	3.0	3.0	1.0	±2.5 pp	1,529	Online	11.9
Spark Insights	May 30, 2025		41	40	7	8	—N/a	—N/a	5	—N/a	3,450	Online	1
Nanos Research	May 30, 2025		41.7	36.4	6.5	10.5	3.4	1.1	0.3	±3.0 pp	1,079 (1/4)	Telephone	5.3
Liaison Strategies	May 23, 2025		44	39	6	8	1	1	1	—N/a	—N/a	IVR	5
Nanos Research	May 23, 2025		40.4	38.6	5.9	9.8	3.7	1.3	0.3	±3.0 pp	1,127 (1/4)	Telephone	1.8
Innovative Research	May 22, 2025		42	39	6	8	3	—N/a	2	—N/a	2,517	Online	3
Abacus Data	May 21, 2025		41	40	7	8	3	1	0	±2.1 pp	2,273	Online	1
Nanos Research	May 16, 2025		41.4	39.6	4.7	8.5	3.9	1.3	0.6	±2.9 pp	1,127 (1/4)	Telephone	1.8
Liaison Strategies	May 9, 2025		45	40	6	7	1	1	0	—N/a	—N/a	IVR	5
Nanos Research	May 9, 2025		41.5	40.5	5.1	7.8	3.3	1.3	0.5	±2.8 pp	1,259 (1/4)	Telephone	1.0
	May 5, 2025	Don Davies is named interim leader of the New Democratic Party.											
Nanos Research	May 2, 2025		41.8	39.2	5.8	7.9	3.2	1.3	0.8	±2.7 pp	1,297 (1/4)	Telephone	2.6
	April 30, 2025	Jonathan Pedneault resigns as co-leader of the Green Party.											
	April 29, 2025	Jagmeet Singh announces his intention to resign as leader of the New Democratic Party.											
2025 election	April 28, 2025		43.8	41.3	6.3	6.3	1.2	0.7	0.4	—N/a	19,597,674	—N/a	2.5

=== Voting intention with different Conservative leader ===
Polling firm	Last date of polling	Link	Hypothetical Conservative Leader	LPC	CPC	BQ	NDP	Others	Undecided	Margin of error	Sample size	Polling method	Lead
Abacus Data	November 8, 2025		Melissa Lantsman	40	23	8	9	3	17	± 1.8 pp	1,244	Online	17
Abacus Data	November 8, 2025		Jamil Jivani	37	24	8	8	3	20	± 1.8 pp	1,330	Online	13
Abacus Data	November 8, 2025		Mark Mulroney	36	27	7	9	3	17	± 1.8 pp	1,328	Online	9
Abacus Data	November 8, 2025		Tim Houston	37	27	8	9	4	15	± 1.8 pp	1,328	Online	10
Abacus Data	November 8, 2025		Michelle Rempel Garner	39	28	6	8	3	16	± 1.8 pp	1,271	Online	11
Abacus Data	November 8, 2025		Caroline Mulroney	36	29	8	9	3	15	± 1.8 pp	1,291	Online	7
Abacus Data	November 8, 2025		Jason Kenney	38	30	5	10	4	14	± 1.8 pp	1,258	Online	8
Abacus Data	November 8, 2025		Doug Ford	34	31	7	10	5	14	± 1.8 pp	1,284	Online	3
Abacus Data	November 8, 2025		Stephen Harper	39	34	6	7	1	12	± 1.8 pp	1,310	Online	5
Abacus Data	November 8, 2025		Pierre Poilievre	36	38	5	7	4	10	± 1.8 pp	2,922	Online	2
2025 election	April 28, 2025		Pierre Poilievre	43.8	41.8	6.3	6.3	2.3	—N/a	—N/a	19,597,674	—N/a	2.5

== Regional polls ==
A number of polling firms survey federal voting intentions on a regional or provincial level. Note that this section displays results from stand-alone polls, not subsets of national polls.

=== Central Canada ===
==== Quebec ====
Polling firm	Last date of polling	Link	LPC	CPC	BQ	NDP	GPC	PPC	Others	Margin of error	Sample size	Polling method	Lead
Liaison Strategies	April 27, 2026		42	21	22	9	3	2	1	± 3.1 pp	1,000	IVR	20
Léger	April 20, 2026		47	17	29	5	2	—N/a	1	± 3.05 pp	1,030	Online	18
Léger	November 10, 2025		39	25	28	5	2	1	—N/a	± 3.1 pp	1,031	Online	11
Léger	September 15, 2025		42	21	30	4	3	—N/a	1	± 3.02 pp	1,053	Online	12
Léger	August 18, 2025		43	22	28	5	2	—N/a	0	± 3.1 pp	977	Online	15
Léger	June 22, 2025		44	23	25	5	3	—N/a	0	± 3.0 pp	1,056	Online	19
2025 election	April 28, 2025		42.6	23.3	27.7	4.5	0.9	0.8	0.2	—N/a	4,457,743	—N/a	14.9

==== Ontario ====
Polling firm	Last date of polling	Link	LPC	CPC	NDP	GPC	PPC	Others	Margin of error	Sample size	Polling method	Lead
Mainstreet Research	September 29, 2026		50.2	30.3	11.2	2.3	1.6	4.4	± 2.8 pp	1,203	IVR	19.9
Léger	May 25, 2025		54	37	5	3	—N/a	1	± 3.1 pp	908	Online	17
2025 election	April 28, 2025		49.0	43.8	4.9	1.2	0.7	0.2	—N/a	7,576,590	—N/a	5.2

=== Western Canada ===
==== Manitoba ====
Polling firm	Last date of polling	Link	LPC	CPC	NDP	GPC	PPC	Others	Margin of error	Sample size	Polling method	Lead
Probe Research	March 13, 2026		46	39	8	—N/a	—N/a	5	± 3.1 pp	1,000	IVR	7
Probe Research	December 10, 2025		43	38	14	—N/a	—N/a	6	± 3.1 pp	1,000	IVR	5
2025 election	April 28, 2025		40.8	46.3	11.0	0.7	1.0	0.2	—N/a	639,282	—N/a	5.5

==== Alberta ====
Polling firm	Last date of polling	Link	LPC	CPC	NDP	GPC	PPC	Others	Margin of error	Sample size	Polling method	Lead
Mainstreet Research	April 22, 2026		40.3	45.8	8.9	1.1	2.5	1.4	± 1.8 pp	3,129	IVR	5.5
Abacus Data	February 25, 2026		36	51	7	1	2	2	± 3.1 pp	1,000	Online	15
Mainstreet Research	February 12, 2026		45	48	5	1	1	1	± 2.5 pp	1,504	IVR	3
Léger	May 25, 2025		35	54	5	3	—N/a	4	± 3.0 pp	925	Online	19
2025 election	April 28, 2025		27.9	63.5	6.3	0.4	0.9	0.8	—N/a	2,262,524	—N/a	35.6

==== British Columbia ====
Polling firm	Last date of polling	Link	LPC	CPC	NDP	GPC	PPC	Others	Margin of error	Sample size	Polling method	Lead
Mainstreet Research	October 1, 2026		43.7	33.7	14.9	3.2	0.2	4.2	± 3.4 pp	827	IVR	10.0
Mainstreet Research	April 13, 2026		51.2	32.2	8.8	3.7	0.0	3.2	± 2.8 pp	1,275	IVR	19.0
Mainstreet Research	March 13, 2026		46.7	34.1	9.6	3.9	1.4	4.3	± 3.0 pp	1,054	IVR	12.6
2025 election	April 28, 2025		41.8	41.0	13.0	3.0	0.5	0.6	—N/a	2,638,307	—N/a	0.8

== Leadership polls ==
Aside from conducting the usual opinion surveys on general party preferences, polling firms also survey public opinion on which political party leader would make the best prime minister.

=== November 2026 - present ===
Polling firm	Last date of polling	Link	Mark Carney	Pierre Poilievre	Yves-François Blanchet	Avi Lewis	Mike Morrice	Maxime Bernier	Unsure/none	Margin of error	Lead

=== March 2026 – November 2026 ===
Polling firm	Last date of polling	Link	Mark Carney	Pierre Poilievre	Yves-François Blanchet	Avi Lewis	Elizabeth May	Maxime Bernier	Unsure/none	Margin of error	Lead
Nanos Research	November 13, 2026		56.1	20.2	2.7	3.6	2.3	2.6	12.4	±3.1 pp	35.9
Nanos Research	November 6, 2026		54.4	20.4	3.8	4.8	2.1	2.1	12.4	±3.1 pp	34.0
Nanos Research	October 30, 2026		56.4	21.5	2.8	4.7	2.0	2.0	10.6	±3.1 pp	34.9
Nanos Research	October 23, 2026		57.7	21.2	2.6	4.6	1.8	1.9	10.3	±3.1 pp	36.5
Nanos Research	October 16, 2026		61.3	21.0	1.9	3.8	1.7	1.6	8.7	±3.1 pp	40.3
Nanos Research	October 9, 2026		60.7	20.9	1.8	3.3	2.3	1.5	9.6	±3.1 pp	39.8
Nanos Research	October 2, 2026		59.2	20.4	1.8	3.6	3.1	1.6	10.3	±3.1 pp	38.8
Nanos Research	September 25, 2026		61.5	19.6	1.7	3.1	3.1	1.5	9.6	±3.1 pp	41.9
Nanos Research	September 18, 2026		58.6	21.3	2.0	3.8	2.6	0.8	11	±3.1 pp	37.3
Nanos Research	September 11, 2026		56.1	21.1	2.3	4.5	2.3	1.6	12	±3.1 pp	35.0
Nanos Research	September 4, 2026		55.2	21.3	2.1	4.1	2.8	1.5	13	±3.1 pp	33.9
Nanos Research	August 7, 2026		53.6	18.0	2.4	4.5	2.6	1.5	17	±3.1 pp	35.6
Research Co.	August 7, 2026		45	22	3	3	6	3	18	±3.1 pp	23
Nanos Research	July 17, 2026		51.7	22.0	2.5	5.9	1.6	1.3	15	±3.1 pp	29.7
Nanos Research	July 3, 2026		50.8	23.7	2.9	5.7	2.0	1.5	13	±3.1 pp	27.1
Nanos Research	June 19, 2026		48.9	24.5	2.7	4.7	3.0	1.3	15	±3.1 pp	24.4
Nanos Research	June 12, 2026		48.6	24.1	2.7	5.3	3.8	1.5	14	±3.1 pp	24.5
Nanos Research	June 5, 2026		48.8	22.6	2.5	6.7	4.1	1.3	14	±3.1 pp	26.2
Nanos Research	May 29, 2026		47.3	25.1	2.4	6.4	3.7	1.3	14	±3.1 pp	22.2
Nanos Research	May 22, 2026		48.9	24.1	2.1	6.5	3.3	1.7	13	±3.1 pp	24.8
Nanos Research	May 15, 2026		50.5	24.1	1.6	5.3	2.3	1.6	14	±3.1 pp	26.4
Nanos Research	May 8, 2026		52.5	25.2	2.5	3.5	2.1	1.7	14	±3.1 pp	27.3
Nanos Research	May 1, 2026		51.1	24.4	2.9	5.1	2.4	1.5	12	±3.1 pp	26.7
Nanos Research	April 24, 2026		49.8	25.6	3.8	4.6	2.7	1.4	12	±3.1 pp	24.2
Nanos Research	April 17, 2026		51.6	25.7	3.8	4.6 (Note: Davies & Lewis)	2.5	0.6	11	±3.1 pp	25.9
Nanos Research	April 10, 2026		52.1	24.5	3.4	4.0	1.7	0.6	14	±3.1 pp	27.6
Nanos Research	April 3, 2026		54.2	22.9	3.2	3.2	1.9	0.6	14	±3.1 pp	31.3

=== May 2025 – March 2026 ===
Polling firm	Last date of polling	Link	Mark Carney	Pierre Poilievre	Yves-François Blanchet	Don Davies	Elizabeth May	Maxime Bernier	Unsure/none	Margin of error	Lead
Nanos Research	March 27, 2026		54.5	22.9	2.4	2.6	2.0	0.8	15	±3.1 pp	31.6
Nanos Research	March 20, 2026		54.5	22.4	2.4	2.5	2.4	1.3	14	±3.1 pp	32.1
Nanos Research	March 13, 2026		56.5	22.0	2.1	2.9	2.2	1.9	12.4	±3.0 pp	34.5
Nanos Research	March 6, 2026		56.9	21.6	2.4	2.2	2.6	1.5	12.7	±3.0 pp	35.3
Nanos Research	February 27, 2026		56.0	22.2	2.4	1.9	2.6	2.5	12.4	±3.0 pp	33.8
Nanos Research	February 20, 2026		54.3	23.1	3.0	2.4	2.3	2.1	12.7	±3.0 pp	31.2
Nanos Research	February 13, 2026		53.0	24.2	3.0	2.5	2.8	1.7	13	±3.0 pp	28.8
Nanos Research	February 6, 2026		53.4	24.2	3.7	3.3	1.2	1.9	12	±3.0 pp	29.2
Research Co.	February 5, 2026		44	25	4	4	3	2	19	±3.1 pp	19
Nanos Research	January 30, 2026		54.3	24.7	3.8	4.5	1.0	1.5	10	±3.0 pp	29.6
Nanos Research	January 27, 2026		52.8	24.8	3.4	3.5	2.5	1.9	11	±3.0 pp	28.0
Nanos Research	January 16, 2026		51.3	25.3	3.7	3.0	3.6	2.2	10.9	±3.0 pp	26.0
Nanos Research	January 9, 2026		48.8	27.1	4.3	2.5	3.6	1.7	12.0	±3.0 pp	21.7
Nanos Research	December 5, 2025		50.1	27.6	6.3	3.9	1.5	0.6	10.0	±3.0 pp	22.5
Léger	November 30, 2025		40	28	—N/a	4	4	—N/a	24	±2.47 pp	12
Nanos Research	November 28, 2025		53.3	25.2	6.9	4.5	1.3	0.9	7.9	±3.0 pp	28.1
Nanos Research	November 21, 2025		52.6	25.9	5.4	4.3	1.8	1.1	8.9	±3.0 pp	26.7
Nanos Research	November 14, 2025		50.3	28.1	5.4	4.4	1.9	1.2	8.8	±3.0 pp	22.2
Nanos Research	November 7, 2025		51.1	27.0	5.0	4.8	2.4	1.5	8.1	±2.9 pp	24.1
Nanos Research	October 31, 2025		49.3	27.0	4.4	4.8	2.3	1.5	10.7	±3.0 pp	22.3
Nanos Research	October 24, 2025		49.4	27.4	4.2	4.6	2.3	1.3	10.9	±3.0 pp	22.0
Nanos Research	October 17, 2025		47.1	27.4	3.6	4.0	3.3	1.2	13.5	±3.1 pp	19.7
Nanos Research	October 10, 2025		46.3	27.8	2.9	3.7	3.4	1.0	15.0	±3.1 pp	18.5
Nanos Research	October 3, 2025		48.9	28.6	2.3	3.1	3.2	0.9	13.0	±3.1 pp	20.3
Nanos Research	September 26, 2025		49.6	28.5	1.8	3.1	3.3	1.1	12.6	±3.1 pp	21.1
Nanos Research	September 19, 2025		50.7	28.6	1.9	2.9	2.2	1.5	12.3	±3.0 pp	22.1
Research Co.	September 12, 2025		44	31	4	3	3	1	14	±3.1 pp	13
Nanos Research	September 12, 2025		51.2	28.2	2.0	2.6	1.8	1.6	12.5	±3.0 pp	23.0
Nanos Research	September 5, 2025		50.2	28.0	2.0	2.8	1.9	1.2	13.9	±3.1 pp	22.2
Nanos Research	August 29, 2025		51.3	27.0	2.5	2.5	1.5	1.0	14.2	±3.1 pp	24.3
Nanos Research	August 22, 2025		52.2	26.5	2.8	1.8	1.9	1.4	13.3	±3.0 pp	25.7
Nanos Research	August 15, 2025		51.5	24.4	3.2	2.4	2.1	2.1	14.3	±3.0 pp	27.1
Nanos Research	August 8, 2025		51.7	23.7	3.8	2.0	2.5	1.9	14.4	±3.0 pp	28.0
Nanos Research	August 1, 2025		50.6	22.9	3.5	2.1	2.7	2.7	15.5	±3.0 pp	27.7
Innovative Research	July 28, 2025		40	29	3	3	3	2	20	—N/a	11
Nanos Research	July 25, 2025		49.3	23.9	3.3	2.0	2.6	1.5	17.4	±3.1 pp	25.4
Nanos Research	July 18, 2025		50.8	24.5	3.3	1.4	2.1	1.4	16.5	±3.1 pp	26.3
Nanos Research	July 11, 2025		52.1	25.2	2.6	1.8	1.8	1.4	15.1	±3.0 pp	26.9
Nanos Research	July 4, 2025		52.0	24.5	2.7	2.5	1.1	1.4	15.8	±3.0 pp	27.5
Research Co.	July 2, 2025		47	31	3	4	2	1	12	±3.1 pp	16
Innovative Research	June 30, 2025		43	30	3	4	3	1	17	—N/a	13
Nanos Research	June 27, 2025		52.7	22.9	2.5	2.2	2.1	1.6	15.9	±3.0 pp	29.8
Nanos Research	June 20, 2025		52.1	23.2	2.3	2.8	0.9	1.4	16.1	±3.0 pp	28.9
Nanos Research	June 13, 2025		49.7	24.2	3.4	2.5	2.0	1.5	16.8	±3.1 pp	25.5
Nanos Research	June 6, 2025		50.6	26.1	3.1	3.0	2.8	1.8	12.6	±3.0 pp	24.5
Nanos Research	May 30, 2025		47.4	28.4	3.8	3.1	2.4	1.9	13.0	±3.0 pp	19.0
Nanos Research	May 23, 2025		45.8	34.1	3.9	2.2	2.5	1.7	9.8	±3.0 pp	11.7
Innovative Research	May 22, 2025		43	30	3	4	2	2	18	—N/a	13
Nanos Research	May 16, 2025		46.9	37.4	3.2	2.7	2.3	1.2	4.9	±2.9 pp	9.5
Nanos Research	May 9, 2025		46.9	39.3	3.1	2.8	1.8	1.1	4.9	±2.8 pp	7.6

=== April 2025 – May 2025 ===
Polling firm	Last date of polling	Link	Mark Carney	Pierre Poilievre	Yves-François Blanchet	Jagmeet Singh	Elizabeth May	Maxime Bernier	Unsure/none	Margin of error	Lead
Nanos Research	May 2, 2025		46.9	40.7	3.2	3.3	1.9	1.1	8.5	±2.7 pp	6.2

== Government approval polls ==
=== Table of polls ===
Polling firm	Last date of polling	Link	Approve	Disapprove	Unsure/neither	Margin of error	Sample size	Polling method	Net approval
Léger	November 16, 2026		59%	34%	7%	±2.5 pp	1,522	Online	+25%
Liaison Strategies	November 14, 2026		64%	28%	8%	±3.1 pp	1,000	IVR	+36%
Liaison Strategies	November 7, 2026		65%	28%	7%	±3.1 pp	1,000	IVR	+37%
Angus Reid	November 6, 2026		58%	34%	8%	±2.0 pp	1,634	Online	+24%
Abacus Data	November 4, 2026		57%	27%	15%	±2.2 pp	1,926	Online	+30%
Liaison Strategies	October 31, 2026		64%	28%	8%	±3.1 pp	1,000	IVR	+36%
Liaison Strategies	October 24, 2026		65%	27%	8%	±3.1 pp	1,000	IVR	+38%
Abacus Data	October 21, 2026		59%	26%	15%	±2.5 pp	1,500	Online	+33%
Liaison Strategies	October 17, 2026		64%	28%	8%	±3.1 pp	1,000	IVR	+36%
Abacus Data	October 13, 2026		57%	29%	14%	±1.7 pp	3,197	Online	+28%
Léger	October 12, 2026		57%	35%	8%	±2.5 pp	1,525	Online	+22%
Liaison Strategies	October 10, 2026		64%	29%	7%	±2.8 pp	1,263	IVR	+35%
Liaison Strategies	October 3, 2026		66%	27%	7%	±2.5 pp	1,526	IVR	+39%
Ekos	October 2, 2026		62%	31%	7%	±1.7 pp	2,020	Telephone	+31%
Liaison Strategies	September 26, 2026		64%	29%	7%	±2.5 pp	1,526	IVR	+35%
Abacus Data	September 23, 2026		60%	25%	15%	±1.9 pp	2,744	Online	+35%
Liaison Strategies	September 19, 2026		65%	28%	7%	±2.5 pp	1,526	IVR	+37%
Liaison Strategies	September 12, 2026		66%	27%	8%	±2.5 pp	1,526	IVR	+39%
Abacus Data	September 9, 2026		59%	27%	15%	±2.5 pp	1,479	Online	+32%
Léger	September 7, 2026		57%	36%	7%	±2.5 pp	1,538	Online	+21%
Liaison Strategies	September 5, 2026		66%	26%	8%	±2.5 pp	1,526	IVR	+40%
Angus Reid	September 4, 2026		62%	31%	7%	±2.0 pp	1,498	Online	+31%
Liaison Strategies	August 29, 2026		64%	27%	8%	±2.5 pp	1,526	IVR	+37%
Abacus Data	August 26, 2026		56%	29%	15%	±2.2 pp	2,022	Online	+27%
Liaison Strategies	August 15, 2026		60%	31%	9%	±2.5 pp	1,526	IVR	+29%
Abacus Data	August 12, 2026		52%	31%	17%	±2.5 pp	1,499	Online	+21%
Liaison Strategies	August 8, 2026		57%	33%	9%	±2.5 pp	1,526	IVR	+24%
Léger	August 3, 2026		54%	38%	8%	±2.5 pp	1,514	Online	+16%
Liaison Strategies	August 1, 2026		57%	34%	9%	±2.5 pp	1,526	IVR	+23%
Abacus Data	July 29, 2026		52%	32%	16%	±2.2 pp	1,910	Online	+20%
Liaison Strategies	July 25, 2026		56%	35%	9%	±2.5 pp	1,526	IVR	+21%
Liaison Strategies	July 18, 2026		57%	35%	8%	±2.5 pp	1,526	IVR	+22%
Abacus Data	July 16, 2026		52%	32%	16%	±1.5 pp	4,205	Online	+20%
Liaison Strategies	July 11, 2026		58%	35%	7%	±2.5 pp	1,526	IVR	+23%
Liaison Strategies	July 4, 2026		58%	35%	7%	±2.5 pp	1,458	IVR	+23%
Abacus Data	July 2, 2026		54%	31%	15%	±2.0 pp	2,366	Online	+23%
Liaison Strategies	June 27, 2026		58%	36%	6%	±2.5 pp	1,526	IVR	+22%
Léger	June 22, 2026		57%	36%	8%	±2.5 pp	1,528	Online	+21%
Liaison Strategies	June 20, 2026		57%	36%	7%	±2.5 pp	1,526	IVR	+21%
Liaison Strategies	June 13, 2026		57%	37%	6%	±2.5 pp	1,526	IVR	+20%
Liaison Strategies	June 6, 2026		55%	39%	6%	±2.5 pp	1,526	IVR	+16%
Abacus Data	June 2, 2026		52%	31%	16%	±2.2 pp	1,920	Online	+21%
Liaison Strategies	May 31, 2026		57%	38%	5%	±2.5 pp	1,526	IVR	+19%
Liaison Strategies	May 23, 2026		59%	35%	6%	±2.5 pp	1,526	IVR	+24%
Abacus Data	May 20, 2026		59%	27%	14%	±2.23 pp	1,920	Online	+32%
Liaison Strategies	May 16, 2026		56%	36%	8%	±2.5 pp	1,526	IVR	+20%
Liaison Strategies	May 9, 2026		58%	34%	8%	±2.5 pp	1,526	IVR	+24%
Abacus Data	May 5, 2026		57%	28%	15%	±2.0 pp	2,478	Online	+29%
Liaison Strategies	May 2, 2026		60%	32%	8%	±3.1 pp	1,000	IVR	+28%
Léger	April 26, 2026		57%	35%	8%	±2.51 pp	1,521	Online	+22%
Liaison Strategies	April 25, 2026		62%	31%	7%	±3.1 pp	1,000	IVR	+31%
Abacus Data	April 22, 2026		54%	29%	17%	±2.2 pp	2,000	Online	+25%
Liaison Strategies	April 18, 2026		62%	29%	9%	±3.1 pp	1,000	IVR	+33%
Liaison Strategies	April 11, 2026		60%	29%	11%	±3.1 pp	1,000	IVR	+31%
Spark Insights	April 8, 2026		65%	35%	—N/a	—N/a	4,026	Online	+30%
Abacus Data	April 8, 2026		54%	30%	16%	±2.39 pp	1,680	Online	+24%
Liaison Strategies	April 4, 2026		61%	32%	7%	±3.1 pp	1,000	IVR	+29%
Léger	March 30, 2026		58%	33%	9%	±2.43 pp	1,618	Online	+25%
Liaison Strategies	March 28, 2026		63%	32%	5%	±3.1 pp	1,000	IVR	+31%
Spark Insights	March 26, 2026		68%	32%	—N/a	—N/a	4,000	Online	+36%
Abacus Data	March 24, 2026		54%	30%	16%	±2.51 pp	1,515	Online	+24%
Liaison Strategies	March 21, 2026		64%	32%	6%	±3.1 pp	1,000	IVR	+32%
Liaison Strategies	March 14, 2026		63%	33%	6%	±3.1 pp	1,000	IVR	+30%
Abacus Data	March 11, 2026		56%	28%	16%	±2.2 pp	1,931	Online	+28%
Liaison Strategies	March 7, 2026		64%	31%	5%	±3.1 pp	1,000	IVR	+33%
Spark Insights	March 6, 2026		66%	34%	—N/a	—N/a	3,055	Online	+32%
Léger	March 2, 2026		59%	33%	8%	±2.43 pp	1,627	Online	+26%
Liaison Strategies	February 28, 2026		61%	33%	6%	±3.1 pp	1,000	IVR	+28%
Liaison Strategies	February 21, 2026		63%	32%	5%	±3.1 pp	1,000	IVR	+31%
Innovative Research	February 17, 2026		55%	41%	4%	—N/a	1,000	Online	+14%
Liaison Strategies	February 14, 2026		63%	32%	5%	±3.1 pp	1,000	IVR	+31%
Abacus Data	February 10, 2026		51%	29%	—N/a	±2.2 pp	1,915	Online	+22%
Liaison Strategies	February 7, 2026		62%	33%	5%	±3.1 pp	1,000	IVR	+29%
Liaison Strategies	January 31, 2026		64%	33%	3%	±3.1 pp	1,000	IVR	+31%
Abacus Data	January 27, 2026		54%	31%	—N/a	±2.0 pp	2,498	Online	+23%
Léger	January 26, 2026		58%	35%	8%	±2.44 pp	1,611	Online	+23%
Liaison Strategies	January 24, 2026		62%	33%	5%	±3.1 pp	1,000	IVR	+29%
Liaison Strategies	January 17, 2026		57%	36%	7%	±3.1 pp	1,000	IVR	+21%
Abacus Data	January 14, 2026		47%	34%	—N/a	±2.3 pp	1,850	Online	+13%
Liaison Strategies	January 10, 2026		56%	37%	7%	±3.1 pp	1,000	IVR	+19%
Liaison Strategies	January 3, 2026		55%	39%	6%	±3.1 pp	1,000	IVR	+16%
Liaison Strategies	December 28, 2025		56%	40%	4%	±3.1 pp	1,000	IVR	+16%
Liaison Strategies	December 21, 2025		57%	39%	4%	±3.1 pp	1,000	IVR	+18%
Abacus Data	December 9, 2025		47%	35%	—N/a	±1.53 pp	1,500	Online	+12%
Abacus Data	December 1, 2025		47%	33%	—N/a	±2.3 pp	1,802	Online	+14%
Léger	November 30, 2025		49%	40%	11%	±2.47 pp	1,579	Online	+9%
Liaison Strategies	November 30, 2025		59%	36%	5%	±3.1 pp	1,000	IVR	+23%
Abacus Data	November 27, 2025		48%	32%	—N/a	±2 pp	2,421	Online	+16%
Liaison Strategies	November 8, 2025		61%	34%	5%	±3.1 pp	1,000	IVR	+27%
Abacus Data	November 6, 2025		44%	34%	—N/a	±2.23 pp	1,916	Online	+10%
Liaison Strategies	November 4, 2025		62%	32%	6%	±3.1 pp	1,000	IVR	+30%
Léger	November 3, 2025		50%	41%	9%	±2.5 pp	1,585	Online	+9%
Abacus Data	October 29, 2025		47%	34%	—N/a	±1.8 pp	2,922	Online	+13%
Abacus Data	October 15, 2025		48%	32%	—N/a	±1.5 pp	4,501	Online	+16%
Léger	October 5, 2025		46%	42%	12%	±2.5 pp	1,562	Online	+4%
Abacus Data	October 1, 2025		46%	31%	—N/a	±2.1 pp	1,504	Online	+15%
Liaison Strategies	September 21, 2025		60%	35%	6%	±3.1 pp	1,000	IVR	+25%
Abacus Data	September 17, 2025		50%	30%	—N/a	±2.1 pp	2,230	Online	+20%
Ipsos	September 8, 2025		58%	42%	—N/a	±3.8 pp	1,001	Online	+16%
Léger	September 7, 2025		51%	38%	11%	±2.5 pp	1,592	Online	+13%
Abacus Data	September 2, 2025		48%	30%	—N/a	±2.5 pp	1,500	Online	+18%
Liaison Strategies	August 27, 2025		63%	33%	6%	±3.1 pp	1,000	IVR	+30%
Abacus Data	August 19, 2025		49%	30%	—N/a	±2.2 pp	1,915	Online	+19%
Abacus Data	August 7, 2025		50%	27%	—N/a	±2.4 pp	1,686	Online	+23%
Léger	August 4, 2025		54%	34%	12%	±2.4 pp	1,617	Online	+20%
Innovative Research	July 28, 2025		54%	40%	7%	—N/a	3,732	Online	+14%
Abacus Data	July 15, 2025		52%	27%	—N/a	±2.2 pp	1,915	Online	+25%
Léger	July 6, 2025		55%	33%	13%	±2.5 pp	1,546	Online	+22%
Abacus Data	July 2, 2025		52%	25%	—N/a	±2.5 pp	1,500	Online	+27%
Innovative Research	June 30, 2025		52%	42%	6%	—N/a	4,029	Online	+10%
Abacus Data	June 19, 2025		52%	25%	—N/a	±1.9 pp	1,500	Online	+27%
Spark Insights	June 9, 2025		67%	33%	—N/a	—N/a	2,500	Online	+34%
Abacus Data	June 5, 2025		53%	23%	—N/a	±1.9 pp	2,585	Online	+30%
Spark Insights	May 30, 2025		64%	36%	—N/a	—N/a	3,450	Online	+28%
Innovative Research	May 22, 2025		49%	43%	8%	—N/a	2,517	Online	+6%
Abacus Data	May 21, 2025		50%	24%	—N/a	±2.1 pp	2,273	Online	+26%

== See also ==
- Opinion polling for the 46th Canadian federal election by constituency
