= Toronto City Council 2022–2026 =

2022–2026 Toronto City Council
←	2018–2022	2026–2030	→

Overview
- Legislative body: Toronto City Council
- Meeting place: Toronto City Hall
- Term: November 15, 2022 – November 15, 2026
- Election: 2022 Toronto municipal election
- Website: www.toronto.ca/council

City Council
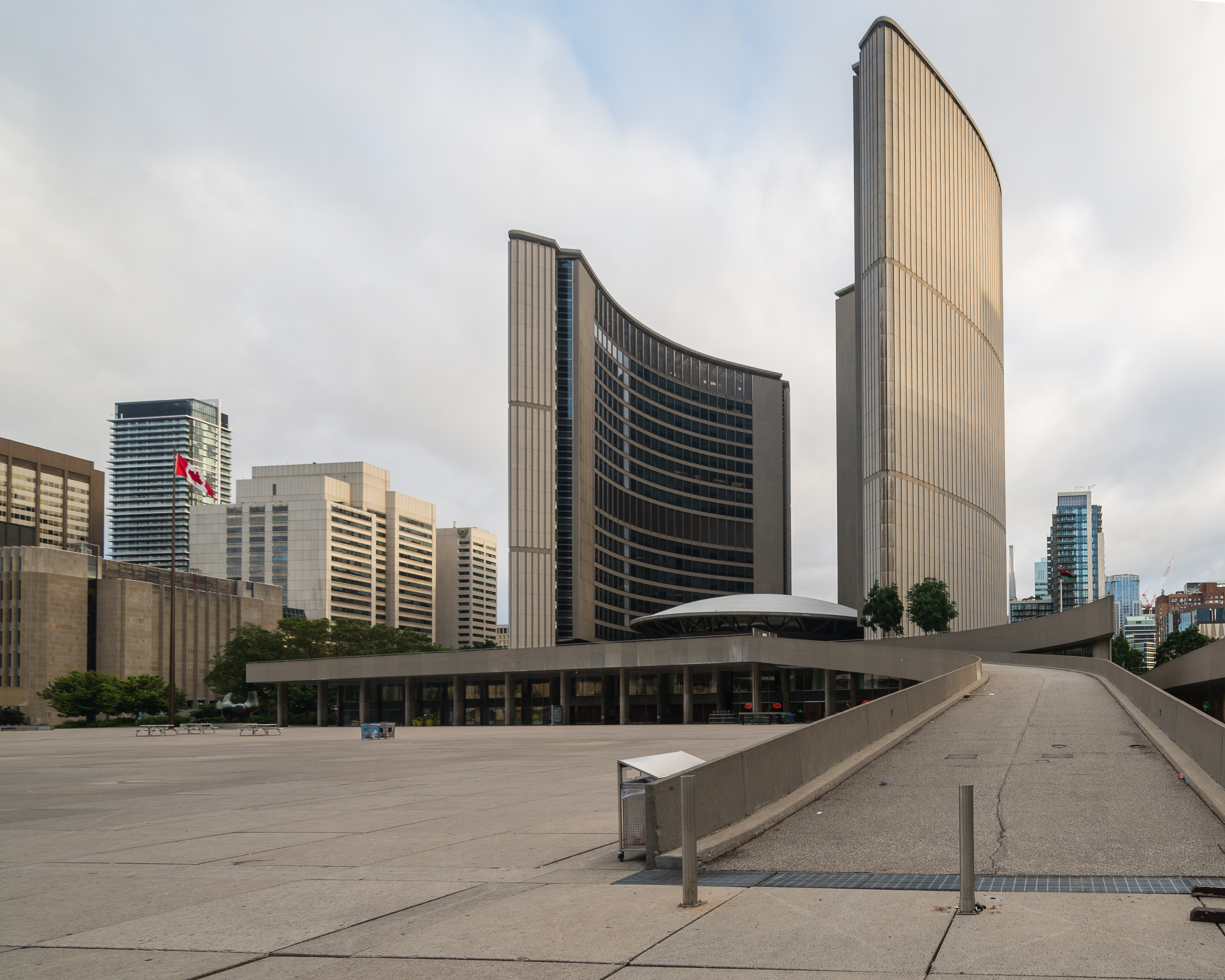
- Toronto City Hall is the seat of government
- Members: 26
- Mayor: John Tory (2014–2023); Olivia Chow (since 2023)
- Deputy Mayor: Jennifer McKelvie (2022–2023); Ausma Malik (since 2023)
- Speaker: Frances Nunziata
- Deputy Speaker: Stephen Holyday

The 2022–2026 Toronto City Council term is the present term of Toronto City Council. It initially consisted of members elected in the 2022 municipal election (including the 2022 mayoral election) held on October 24. Following the election, voters returned city councillors in the city's 25 wards as well as the mayor of Toronto, who is elected city-wide. The city uses a first-past-the-post system to elect all positions.

The council term began on November 15, 2022. Membership changes occurred with by-elections in 2023 (city-wide mayoral by-election held on June 26 and by-election for Ward 20 Scarborough Southwest councillor held on November 30), 2024 (by-election for councillor in Ward 15 Don Valley West held on November 4), and 2025 (by-election for councillor in Ward 25 Scarborough—Rouge Park held on September 29).

Municipal elections in Ontario are held every four years on the fourth Monday in October. The 2026 election was held on October 26, 2026.

== Changes to machinery of government ==
Prior to the election, the province of Ontario passed the Strong Mayors, Building Homes Act, which granted the office of mayor additional powers including the development of the budget, creating council committees, appointing the chairs and vice chairs of those committees, the power to reorganize departments, appointing department heads, and appointing the city manager. The mayor was also granted the power to veto council decisions which do not align with priorities set by the province. On November 16, 2022, the province proposed further changes the powers of the mayor, introducing a bill which would allow by-laws to be passed with only one-third of council voting in favour if the mayor declared it to be in line with provincial priorities.

== Timeline ==
=== 2022 ===
- November 16, 2022: Mayor John Tory deputy mayors: Amber Morley is deputy Mayor, appointed by John Tory. And Jennifer McKelvie appointed as statutory deputy mayor.
- November 23, 2022: Ceremonial first session of council is held. Councillors are presented with their declarations of office and the mayor with his chain of office. Frances Nunziata (Ward 5 York South—Weston) and Stephen Holyday (Ward 2 Etobicoke Centre) are elected as speaker and deputy speaker, respectively. The striking committee is formed to make recommendations to council on committee assignments.

=== 2023 ===
- February 10, 2023: John Tory announces his intention to resign as mayor of Toronto after a Toronto Star investigation reveals he had an extramarital affair with a member of his staff.
- February 17, 2023: Tory officially resigns as mayor. As statutory deputy mayor, Jennifer McKelvie automatically assumes limited mayoral powers to act as the city's chief executive until a by-election is held.
- June 26, 2023: Olivia Chow is elected in the mayoral by-election to serve the remainder of the council term.
- July 12, 2023: Chow takes office as mayor of Toronto.
- July 26, 2023: Ward 20 Scarborough Southwest councillor Gary Crawford resigns.
- August 10, 2023: Councillors Michael Colle, Ausma Malik, Jennifer McKelvie, and Amber Morley, are appointed as deputy mayors.
- November 30, 2023: Former Toronto District School Board trustee Parthi Kandavel is elected in the Ward 20 by-election.

=== 2024 ===
- May 16, 2024: Ward 15 Don Valley West councillor Jaye Robinson dies.
- June 26, 2024: The council seat for Ward 15 Don Valley West is formally declared vacant and a by-election is called.
- November 4, 2024: Toronto District School Board trustee Rachel Chernos Lin is elected in the Ward 15 by-election.

=== 2025 ===
- May 9, 2025: Ward 25 Scarborough—Rouge Park councillor Jennifer McKelvie resigns.
- May 21, 2025: Ward 24 Scarborough—Guildwood councillor Paul Ainslie is appointed Deputy Mayor for Scarborough.
- September 29, 2025: Toronto District School Board trustee Neethan Shan is elected in the Ward 25 by-election.

== Major mayoral decisions ==
=== 2022 ===
- November 23, 2022 (1-2022): establish council committees and community councils.
- November 24, 2022 (2-2022): appoint the chairs and vice chairs of committees.
- December 2, 2022 (8-2022): appointment of Paul Johnson as city manager and chief administrative officer.
- February 17, 2023 (6-2023): delegated the power to appoint the city manager and deputies to council, and the power to hire senior division management to the city manager.

== Major council decisions ==
=== 2022 ===
- November 24, 2022: council votes unanimously to oppose the provincial government's new development bill, seeking to preserve the city’s rental replacement policy, parkland provisions and community and development charges.

== Composition ==
Members of Toronto City Council, 2022–2026 term
Ward (Community Councils)	Incumbent	Notes
Mayor	John Tory (2022–2023)	Resigned on February 17, 2023.
Mayor	Olivia Chow (2023–present)	Elected in a by-election on June 26, 2023.
1 Etobicoke North (Etobicoke and York)	Vincent Crisanti	
2 Etobicoke Centre (Etobicoke and York)	Stephen Holyday	
3 Etobicoke—Lakeshore (Etobicoke and York)	Amber Morley	Deputy Mayor for Etobicoke and York
4 Parkdale—High Park (Toronto and East York)	Gord Perks	
5 York South—Weston (Etobicoke and York)	Frances Nunziata	Speaker
6 York Centre (North York)	James Pasternak	
7 Humber River—Black Creek (North York)	Anthony Perruzza	
8 Eglinton—Lawrence (North York)	Mike Colle	Deputy Mayor for North York
9 Davenport (Toronto and East York)	Alejandra Bravo	
10 Spadina—Fort York (Toronto and East York)	Ausma Malik	Statutory Deputy Mayor since August 10, 2023 Deputy Mayor for Toronto and East York
11 University—Rosedale (Toronto and East York)	Dianne Saxe	
12 Toronto—St. Paul's (Toronto and East York)	Josh Matlow	
13 Toronto Centre (Toronto and East York)	Chris Moise	
14 Toronto—Danforth (Toronto and East York)	Paula Fletcher	Deputy Speaker
15 Don Valley West (North York)	Jaye Robinson (2022–2024)	Died in office on May 16, 2024.
15 Don Valley West (North York)	Rachel Chernos Lin (2024–present)	Elected in a by-election on November 4, 2024.
16 Don Valley East (North York)	Jon Burnside	
17 Don Valley North (North York)	Shelley Carroll	
18 Willowdale (North York)	Lily Cheng	
19 Beaches—East York (Toronto and East York)	Brad Bradford	
20 Scarborough Southwest (Scarborough)	Gary Crawford (2022–2023)	Resigned on July 26, 2023.
20 Scarborough Southwest (Scarborough)	Parthi Kandavel (2023—present)	Took office on November 30, 2023.
21 Scarborough Centre (Scarborough)	Michael Thompson	
22 Scarborough—Agincourt (Scarborough)	Nick Mantas	
23 Scarborough North (Scarborough)	Jamaal Myers	
24 Scarborough—Guildwood (Scarborough)	Paul Ainslie	Deputy Mayor for Scarborough
25 Scarborough—Rouge Park (Scarborough)	Jennifer McKelvie (2022–2025)	Statutory Deputy Mayor until August 10, 2023; assumed certain mayoral powers after Mayor Tory's resignation on February 17, 2023, until the by-election. Deputy Mayor for Scarborough. Resigned on May 9, 2025.
25 Scarborough—Rouge Park (Scarborough)	Neethan Shan (2025–present)	Elected in a by-election on September 29, 2025.

=== Standing committees ===
Executive Committee
Chair; Olivia Chow; Mayor	Vice-chair; Ausma Malik; Deputy Mayor
Members: Paul Ainslie; Alejandra Bravo; Shelley Carroll; Mike Colle; Paula Fletcher; Josh Matlow; Amber Morley; Vacant; Gord Perks
Committee website

Economic and Community Development Committee
Chair; Alejandra Bravo	Vice-chair; Shelley Carroll
Members: Paula Fletcher; Ausma Malik; Chris Moise; Jaye Robinson
Committee website

General Government Committee
Chair; Paul Ainslie	Vice-chair; Stephen Holyday
Members: Jon Burnside; Lily Cheng; Vincent Crisanti; Nick Mantas
Committee website

Infrastructure and Environment Committee
Chair * Vacant	Vice-chair; Mike Colle
Members: Amber Morley; James Pasternak; Anthony Peruzza; Dianne Saxe
Committee website

Planning and Housing Committee
Chair; Gord Perks	Vice-chair; Brad Bradford
Members: Josh Matlow; Jamaal Myers; Frances Nunziata; Michael Thompson
Committee website

=== Special committees ===
Audit Committee
Chair; Stephen Holyday	Vice-chair; Jamaal Myers
Members: Mike Colle; Ausma Malik; Frances Nunziata
Committee website

Budget Committee
Chair; Shelley Carroll	Vice-chair; Gord Perks
Members: Lily Cheng; Chris Moise; Amber Morley; Vacant
Committee website

Civic Appointments Committee
Chair; Vacant	Vice-chair; Frances Nunziata
Members: Jon Burnside; Amber Morley; Jamaal Myers
Committee website

Striking Committee
Chair; Ausma Malik	Vice-chair; Alejandro Bravo
Members: Brad Bradford; Vacant; James Pasternak
Committee website

=== Community councils ===
Etobicoke and York
Chair; Stephen Holyday	Vice-chair; Frances Nunziata
Members: Vincent Crisanti; Amber Morley; Anthony Perruzza
Committee website

North York
Chair; James Pasternak	Vice-chair; Mike Colle
Members: Jon Burnside; Shelley Carrol; Lily Cheng; Jaye Robinson
Committee website

Scarborough
Chair; Paul Ainslie	Vice-chair; Nick Mantas
Members: Parthi Kandavel; Jamaal Myers; Neethan Shan; Michael Thompson
Committee website

Toronto and East York
Chair; Gord Perks	Vice-chair; Brad Bradford
Members: Alejandra Bravo; Paula Fletcher; Ausma Malik; Josh Matlow; Chris Moise; Dianne Saxe
Committee website
