= Deputy Mayor of Toronto =

Municipal office in Ontario, Canada

- Municipal logo

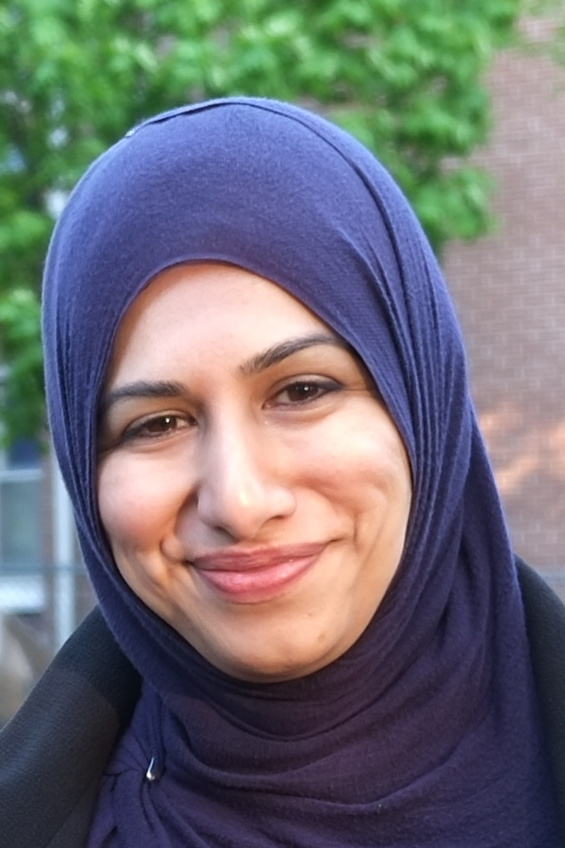
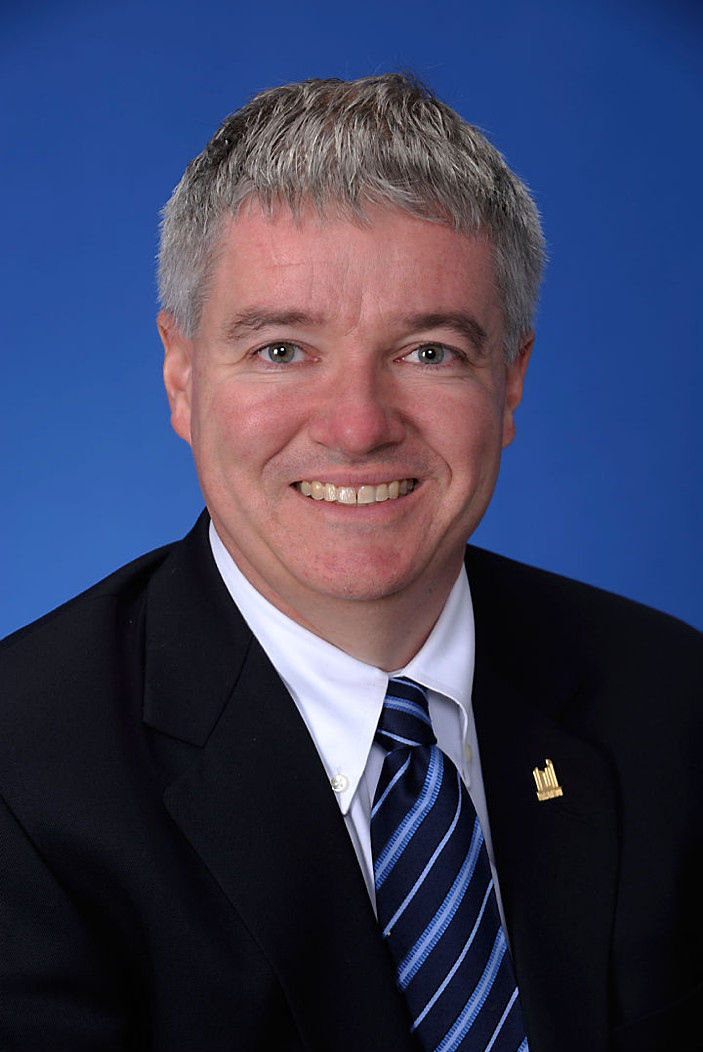
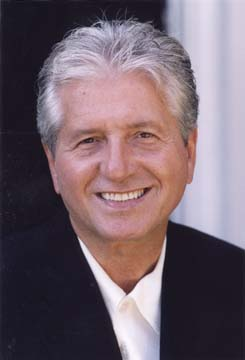
- Ausma Malik; Toronto and East York since August 10, 2023 Paul Ainslie; Scarborough since May 21, 2025 Michael Colle; North York since August 10, 2023 Amber Morley; Etobicoke since August 10, 2023 Statutory; Ausma Malik since August 10, 2023
- Toronto City Council; City of Toronto
- Member of: Toronto City Council
- Seat: Toronto City Hall
- Appointer: Mayor of Toronto
- Constituting instrument: Toronto Municipal Code, Chapter 27
- Salary: CA$128,346.89 (as councillor)
- Website: www.toronto.ca/mayor

The deputy mayor of Toronto is a member of Toronto City Council appointed to assist the mayor of Toronto. One councillor is designated for statutory purposes and additional deputy mayors may be appointed to represent the mayor on an honorary basis, but with no statutory authority.

Ausma Malik was appointed statutory deputy mayor by Mayor Olivia Chow on August 10, 2023, and represents Toronto and East York. Chow has named three additional deputy mayors: Paul Ainslie (Scarborough), Amber Morley (Etobicoke and York), and Michael Colle (North York).

== Statutory deputy mayor ==
The member designated for statutory purposes is sometimes known as the first deputy mayor. This councillor performs the roles and functions assigned to the "deputy mayor" in the City of Toronto Act and various chapters of the Toronto Municipal Code. The statutory deputy mayor has all the rights, power and authority of the mayor created by council, and is the vice-chair of the executive committee. The statutory deputy mayor typically acts when the mayor is unable to.

=== Role during mayoral vacancy ===
When the office of Mayor of Toronto is vacant, the statutory deputy mayor exercises the limited mayoral powers which are granted to the mayor by city council to ensure city business can continue to be carried out. This includes acting as the city's chief executive officer, representing the city, and special privileges during council sessions. The statutory deputy mayor also assumes responsibility for the administrative management of the mayor's office.

The statutory deputy mayor does not become "acting" or "interim" mayor, nor does the deputy mayor assume the "strong-mayor" powers, which are granted by the province to the head of council, a role which remains vacant.

During a mayoral vacancy lasting 30 days or longer, the statutory deputy mayor is compensated at the rate of the mayor, until a new mayor is elected.

== Additional deputy mayors ==
Non-statutory deputy mayors could be appointed to serve ceremonial roles. While holding no statutory authority, they represent the mayor at local events, can act as advisors, or lead a policy file. Additional deputy mayors were appointed under mayors David Miller, John Tory and Olivia Chow.

== History ==
=== List of deputy mayors of Toronto ===
Portrait	Deputy Mayor	Term start	Term end	Council ward	Council term	Status	Notes
Mayor Mel Lastman (1998–2003)
	Case Ootes	February 6, 1998	November 30, 2003	Ward 1 East York	1998–2000	Statutory	
	Case Ootes	February 6, 1998	November 30, 2003	Ward 29 Broadview—Greenwood	2000–2003	Statutory	
Mayor David Miller (2003–2010)
	Joe Pantalone	December 4, 2003	November 30, 2010	Ward 19 Trinity—Spadina	2003–2006	Statutory	
	Joe Pantalone	December 4, 2003	November 30, 2010	Ward 19 Trinity—Spadina	2006–2010	Statutory	
	Sandra Bussin	December 4, 2003	December 1, 2006	Ward 32 Beaches-East York	2003–2006	Non-statutory	
	Mike Feldman	December 4, 2003	December 1, 2006	Ward 10 York Centre	2003–2006	Non-statutory	
Mayor Rob Ford (2010–2014)
	Doug Holyday	December 1, 2010	August 21, 2013	Ward 3 Etobicoke Centre	2010–2014	Statutory	
	Norm Kelly	August 21, 2013	November 30, 2014	Ward 40 Scarborough—Agincourt	2010–2014	Statutory	Certain powers usually assigned to the mayor were transferred to Kelly during a special meeting of city council on November 15, 2013.
Mayor John Tory (2014–2023)
	Denzil Minan-Wong	December 1, 2014	November 15, 2022	Ward 34 Don Valley East	2014–2018	Statutory; North York	
	Denzil Minan-Wong	December 1, 2014	November 15, 2022	Ward 16 Don Valley East	2018–2022	Statutory; North York	
	Glenn De Baeremaeker	December 1, 2014	December 1, 2018	Ward 38 Scarborough Centre	2014–2018	Non-statutory; Scarborough	
	Pam McConnell	December 1, 2014	July 7, 2017	Ward 28 Toronto Centre-Rosedale	2014–2018	Non-statutory; Toronto and East York	
	Vincent Crisanti	December 1, 2014	September 12, 2017	Ward 1 Etobicoke North	2014–2018	Non-statutory;Etobicoke and York	
	Ana Bailão	October 6, 2017	November 15, 2022	Ward 18 Davenport	2014–2018	Non-statutory; Toronto and East York	
	Ana Bailão	October 6, 2017	November 15, 2022	Ward 9 Davenport	2018–2022	Non-statutory; Toronto and East York	
	Stephen Holyday	September 12, 2017	November 15, 2022	Ward 3 Etobicoke Centre	2014–2018	Non-statutory; Etobicoke and York	
	Stephen Holyday	September 12, 2017	November 15, 2022	Ward 2 Etobicoke Centre	2018–2022	Non-statutory; Etobicoke and York	
	Michael Thompson	December 1, 2018	September 29, 2022	Ward 21 Scarborough Centre	2018–2022	Non-statutory; Scarborough	
	Jennifer McKelvie	November 16, 2022	August 10, 2023	Ward 25 Scarborough—Rouge Park	2022–2026	Statutory	Following Mayor Tory's resignation in 2023, McKelvie became the highest-ranking city official and assumed limited mayoral powers.
Mayor Olivia Chow (2023–present)
	Ausma Malik	August 10, 2023	Incumbent	Ward 10 Spadina—Fort York	2022–2026	Statutory; Toronto and East York	Elected Speaker on November 18, 2026.
	Ausma Malik	August 10, 2023	Incumbent	Ward 10 Spadina—Fort York	2026–2030	Statutory; Toronto and East York	Elected Speaker on November 18, 2026.
	Jennifer McKelvie	August 10, 2023	May 9, 2025	Ward 25 Scarborough—Rouge Park	2022–2026	Non-statutory; Scarborough	
	Mike Colle	August 10, 2023	Incumbent	Ward 8 Eglinton—Lawrence	2022–2026	Non-statutory; North York	
	Mike Colle	August 10, 2023	Incumbent	Ward 8 Eglinton—Lawrence	2026–2030	Non-statutory; North York	
	Amber Morley	August 10, 2023	Incumbent	Ward 3 Etobicoke—Lakeshore	2022–2026	Non-statutory; Etobicoke and York	
	Amber Morley	August 10, 2023	Incumbent	Ward 3 Etobicoke—Lakeshore	2026–2030	Non-statutory; Etobicoke and York	
	Paul Ainslie	May 21, 2025	Incumbent	Ward 24 Scarborough—Guildwood	2022–2026	Non-statutory; Scarborough	Appointed chair of the Toronto Transit Commission in November 2026.
	Paul Ainslie	May 21, 2025	Incumbent	Ward 24 Scarborough—Guildwood	2026–2030	Non-statutory; Scarborough	Appointed chair of the Toronto Transit Commission in November 2026.

== See also ==
- List of mayors of Toronto
