= Toronto City Council 2026–2030 =

Term of Toronto City Council

2026–2030 Toronto City Council
←	2022–2026

Overview
- Legislative body: Toronto City Council
- Meeting place: Toronto City Hall
- Term: November 15, 2026 –
- Election: 2026 Toronto municipal election
- Website: www.toronto.ca/city-government/council/

City Council
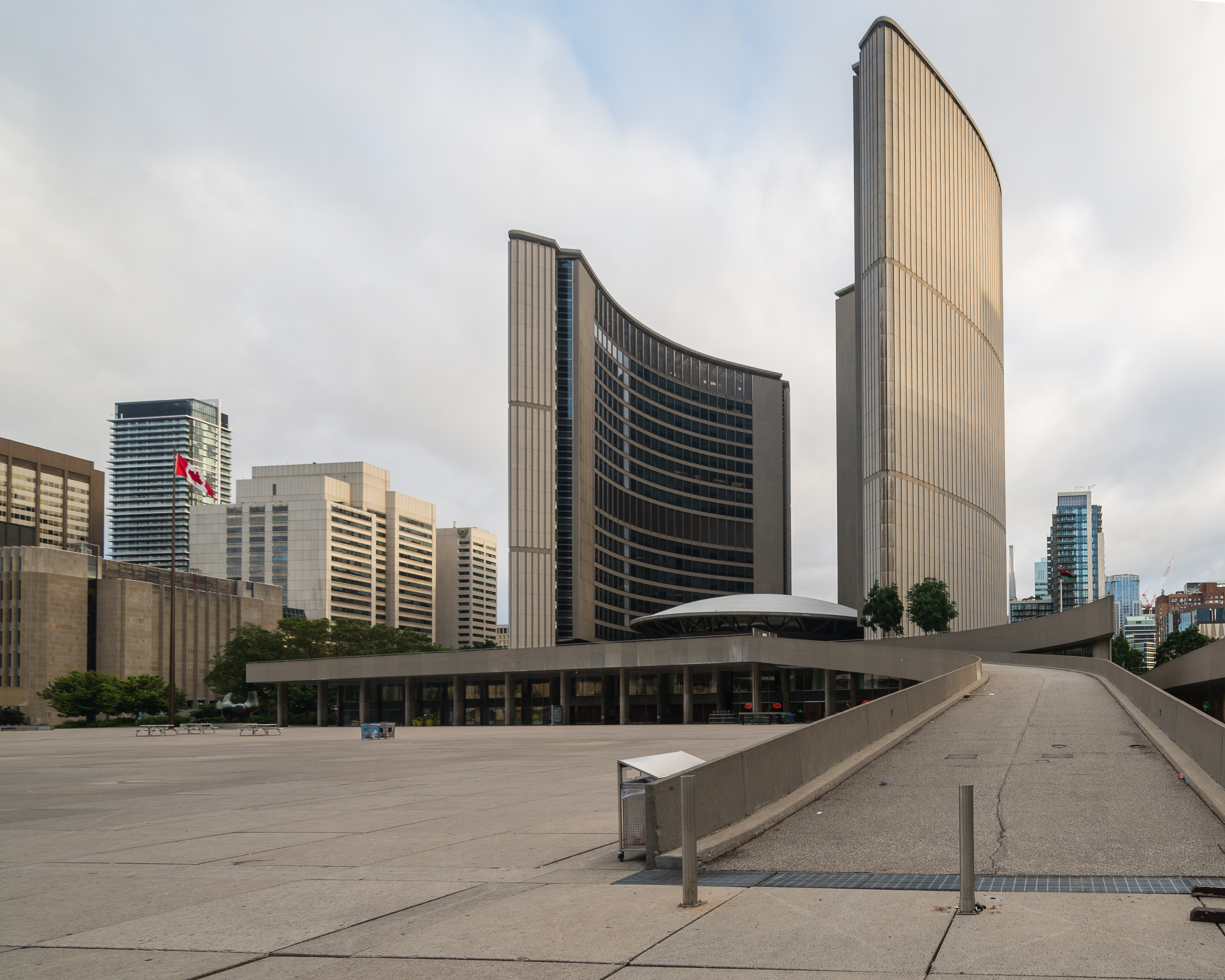
- Toronto City Hall
- Members: 26
- Mayor: Olivia Chow
- Statutory Deputy Mayor: Ausma Malik
- Speaker: Ausma Malik
- Deputy Speaker: Shelley Carroll

The 2026–2030 Toronto City Council term is the current term of Toronto City Council, the governing body of Toronto, Ontario, Canada. It began on November 15, 2026, following the 2026 Toronto municipal election held on October 26. The council consists of 25 councillors elected from individual wards and the mayor of Toronto, who is elected citywide. All members are elected using first-past-the-post voting.

Olivia Chow was re-elected mayor in the 2026 election. At the inaugural meeting on November 18, 2026, council elected Ausma Malik as Speaker and Shelley Carroll as Deputy Speaker. Council approved appointments to committees, agencies, boards and corporations the following day.

== Timeline ==
=== 2026 ===
- October 26: The 2026 Toronto municipal election is held.
- November 15: The 2026–2030 council term begins.
- November 18: The inaugural meeting of council is held. Ausma Malik is elected Speaker and Shelley Carroll is elected Deputy Speaker.
- November 19: Council approves appointments to committees, agencies, boards and corporations. Mayor Chow establishes a revised committee structure, increasing the number of standing policy committees from four to five.

== Composition ==
Members of Toronto City Council, 2026–2030
Ward	Councillor	Community council	Appointments
Mayor	Olivia Chow	Ex officio member of council committees	Mayor; Chair, Executive Committee
1 Etobicoke North	Vincent Crisanti	Etobicoke York	
2 Etobicoke Centre	Stephen Holyday	Etobicoke York	Chair, Audit Committee
3 Etobicoke—Lakeshore	Amber Morley	Etobicoke York	Deputy Mayor for Etobicoke and York
4 Parkdale—High Park	Diana Chan McNally	Toronto and East York	Vice-chair, Planning and Housing Committee
5 York South—Weston	Chiara Padovani	Etobicoke York	Vice-chair, Audit Committee; Chair, Toronto Accessibility Advisory Committee
6 York Centre	James Pasternak	North York	
7 Humber River—Black Creek	Anthony Perruzza	Etobicoke York	
8 Eglinton—Lawrence	Mike Colle	North York	Deputy Mayor for North York; Vice-chair, Infrastructure and Environment Committee; Vice-chair, Corporations Nominating Panel
9 Davenport	Alejandra Bravo	Toronto and East York	Chair, Community and Social Services Committee; Vice-chair, Striking Committee; Chair, Long-Term Care Committee of Management
10 Spadina—Fort York	Ausma Malik	Toronto and East York	Speaker; Statutory Deputy Mayor; Vice-chair, Executive Committee; Chair, Civic Appointments Committee; Chair, Striking Committee; Chair, Exhibition Place Board of Governors
11 University—Rosedale	Mike Layton	Toronto and East York	Chair, Infrastructure and Environment Committee; Vice-chair, Budget Committee; Chair, Corporations Nominating Panel
12 Toronto—St. Paul's	Josh Matlow	Toronto and East York	Member, Executive Committee
13 Toronto Centre	Curran Stikuts	Toronto and East York	
14 Toronto—Danforth	Sara Ehrhardt	Toronto and East York	Vice-chair, Community and Social Services Committee; Vice-chair, Civic Appointments Committee
15 Don Valley West	Rachel Chernos Lin	North York	Vice-chair, General Government and Service Excellence Committee
16 Don Valley East	Jon Burnside	North York	
17 Don Valley North	Shelley Carroll	North York	Deputy Speaker; Budget Chief
18 Willowdale	Lily Cheng	North York	
19 Beaches—East York	Nate Erskine-Smith	Toronto and East York	Chair, Planning and Housing Committee
20 Scarborough Southwest	Parthi Kandavel	Scarborough	
21 Scarborough Centre	Michael Thompson	Scarborough	Chair, Economic Development and Culture Committee
22 Scarborough—Agincourt	Nick Mantas	Scarborough	
23 Scarborough North	Shaun Chen	Scarborough	
24 Scarborough—Guildwood	Paul Ainslie	Scarborough	Deputy Mayor for Scarborough; Chair, General Government and Service Excellence Committee; Chair, Toronto Transit Commission
25 Scarborough—Rouge Park	Neethan Shan	Scarborough	Vice-chair, Economic Development and Culture Committee; Chair, Toronto Zoo Board

== Council leadership ==
=== Mayor and deputy mayors ===
Olivia Chow serves as mayor, with Ausma Malik as statutory deputy mayor. The three non-statutory deputy mayors are Amber Morley for Etobicoke and York, Mike Colle for North York, and Paul Ainslie for Scarborough.

=== Speaker and Deputy Speaker ===
On November 18, 2026, council elected Ausma Malik as Speaker and Shelley Carroll as Deputy Speaker. The Speaker presides over council meetings, while the Deputy Speaker presides in the Speaker's absence.

== Committees ==
On November 19, 2026, Mayor Chow established a revised committee structure under the City of Toronto Act, 2006. The Economic and Community Development Committee was replaced by separate Economic Development and Culture and Community and Social Services committees. The General Government Committee was renamed the General Government and Service Excellence Committee. The number of standing policy committees increased from four to five.

=== Executive Committee ===
The Executive Committee is chaired by Mayor Olivia Chow, with statutory deputy mayor Ausma Malik serving as vice-chair. Under the committee structure established in November 2026, its membership consists of the mayor, the deputy mayors, the chairs of the standing committees, the chair of the Budget Committee and one member-at-large.

The committee considers council's strategic priorities, governance, financial planning and budgeting, fiscal policy, intergovernmental relations, council operations, labour relations and matters related to ending homelessness.

Position	Member
Chair	Olivia Chow
Vice-chair	Ausma Malik
Members	Paul Ainslie
Members	Alejandra Bravo
Members	Shelley Carroll
Members	Mike Colle
Members	Nate Erskine-Smith
Members	Mike Layton
Members	Josh Matlow
Members	Amber Morley
Members	Michael Thompson

=== Standing committees ===
The five standing policy committees report directly to City Council. Their responsibilities include developing policy recommendations, monitoring implementation and providing forums for public participation.

Committee	Chair	Vice-chair	Responsibilities
Community and Social Services	Alejandra Bravo	Sara Ehrhardt	Community wellbeing, social and emergency services, parks and recreation, renter issues, licensing, community development and social inclusion.
Economic Development and Culture	Michael Thompson	Neethan Shan	Economic and workforce development, local businesses, cultural activities and economic prosperity.
General Government and Service Excellence	Paul Ainslie	Rachel Chernos Lin	Municipal administration, procurement, city assets, technology, customer service and organizational effectiveness.
Infrastructure and Environment	Mike Layton	Mike Colle	Infrastructure and municipal services, ravines, forestry and environmental sustainability.
Planning and Housing	Nate Erskine-Smith	Diana Chan McNally	Urban planning, property standards, growth, housing development and housing services.

=== Special committees ===
Five special committees were established for the 2026–2030 term.

Committee	Chair	Vice-chair	Responsibilities
Audit Committee	Stephen Holyday	Chiara Padovani	Reviews external audits, Auditor General reports and audit plans, and makes recommendations on audit matters.
Budget Committee	Shelley Carroll	Mike Layton	Hears public presentations and advises the mayor on operating and capital budgets.
Civic Appointments Committee	Ausma Malik	Sara Ehrhardt	Screens, interviews and recommends public appointments to specified municipal boards and agencies.
Corporations Nominating Panel	Mike Layton	Mike Colle	Screens, interviews and recommends public appointments to boards of city corporations and other designated bodies.
Striking Committee	Ausma Malik	Alejandra Bravo	Recommends councillor appointments to committees, agencies and advisory bodies, and makes recommendations on council and committee meeting schedules.

=== Committee of Revision ===
The Committee of Revision considers objections to proposed charges and special assessments for local improvements. It consists of the statutory deputy mayor and the four community council chairs.

=== Board of Health ===
The Toronto Board of Health oversees public health programs and services, establishes public health policy and advises City Council on public health matters.

== Community councils ==
Toronto's 25 wards are divided among four community councils. They consider local planning and development, traffic and parking, property-related exemptions, streetscape issues and other neighbourhood matters. Community councils may make final decisions on matters delegated by City Council.

=== Etobicoke York Community Council ===
The Etobicoke York Community Council meets at the Etobicoke Civic Centre.

Ward	Member
1 Etobicoke North	Vincent Crisanti
2 Etobicoke Centre	Stephen Holyday
3 Etobicoke—Lakeshore	Amber Morley
5 York South—Weston	Chiara Padovani
7 Humber River—Black Creek	Anthony Perruzza

=== North York Community Council ===
The North York Community Council meets at the North York Civic Centre.

Ward	Member
6 York Centre	James Pasternak
8 Eglinton—Lawrence	Mike Colle
15 Don Valley West	Rachel Chernos Lin
16 Don Valley East	Jon Burnside
17 Don Valley North	Shelley Carroll
18 Willowdale	Lily Cheng

=== Scarborough Community Council ===
The Scarborough Community Council meets at the Scarborough Civic Centre.

Ward	Member
20 Scarborough Southwest	Parthi Kandavel
21 Scarborough Centre	Michael Thompson
22 Scarborough—Agincourt	Nick Mantas
23 Scarborough North	Shaun Chen
24 Scarborough—Guildwood	Paul Ainslie
25 Scarborough—Rouge Park	Neethan Shan

=== Toronto and East York Community Council ===
The Toronto and East York Community Council meets at Toronto City Hall.

Ward	Member
4 Parkdale—High Park	Diana Chan McNally
9 Davenport	Alejandra Bravo
10 Spadina—Fort York	Ausma Malik
11 University—Rosedale	Mike Layton
12 Toronto—St. Paul's	Josh Matlow
13 Toronto Centre	Curran Stikuts
14 Toronto—Danforth	Sara Ehrhardt
19 Beaches—East York	Nate Erskine-Smith

== Timeline ==
=== 2026 ===
- November 15, 2026: the 2026–2030 term begins.
- November 18–19, 2026: when the ceremonial first meeting of council will be held as outlined in the Council Procedures (first Wednesday of November after the commencement of the council term).

== Composition ==
Members of Toronto City Council, 2026–2030 term
Ward (Community Council)	Incumbent	Notes
Mayor	Olivia Chow	
1 Etobicoke North (Etobicoke and York)	Vincent Crisanti	
2 Etobicoke Centre (Etobicoke and York)	Stephen Holyday	
3 Etobicoke—Lakeshore (Etobicoke and York)	Amber Morley	
4 Parkdale—High Park (Toronto and East York)	Diana Chan McNally	
5 York South—Weston (Etobicoke and York)	Chiara Padovani	
6 York Centre (North York)	James Pasternak	
7 Humber River—Black Creek (North York)	Anthony Perruzza	
8 Eglinton—Lawrence (North York)	Mike Colle	
9 Davenport (Toronto and East York)	Alejandra Bravo	
10 Spadina—Fort York (Toronto and East York)	Ausma Malik	
11 University—Rosedale (Toronto and East York)	Mike Layton	
12 Toronto—St. Paul's (Toronto and East York)	Josh Matlow	
13 Toronto Centre (Toronto and East York)	Curran Stikuts	
14 Toronto—Danforth (Toronto and East York)	Sara Ehrhardt	
15 Don Valley West (North York)	Rachel Chernos Lin	
16 Don Valley East (North York)	Jon Burnside	
17 Don Valley North (North York)	Shelley Carroll	
18 Willowdale (North York)	Lily Cheng	
19 Beaches—East York (Toronto and East York)	Nate Erskine-Smith	
20 Scarborough Southwest (Scarborough)	Parthi Kandavel	
21 Scarborough Centre (Scarborough)	Michael Thompson	
22 Scarborough—Agincourt (Scarborough)	Nick Mantas	
23 Scarborough North (Scarborough)	Shaun Chen	
24 Scarborough—Guildwood (Scarborough)	Paul Ainslie	
25 Scarborough—Rouge Park (Scarborough)	Neethan Shan	

=== Community councils ===
Etobicoke and York
Chair TBD	Vice-chair TBD
Members: Vincent Crisanti; Amber Morley; Anthony Perruzza; Stephen Holyday; Chiara Padovani
Committee website

North York
Chair TBD	Vice-chair TBD
Members: Jon Burnside; Shelley Carrol; Lily Cheng; James Pasternak; Anthony Perruzza; Mike Cole; Rachel Chernos Lin
Committee website

Scarborough
Chair TBD	Vice-chair TBD
Members: Parthi Kandavel; Shaun Chen; Neethan Shan; Michael Thompson; Nick Mantas; Paul Painslie
Committee website

Toronto and East York
Chair TBD	Vice-chair TBD
Members: Alejandra Bravo; Ausma Malik; Josh Matlow; Diana Chan McNally; Mike Layton; Curran Stikuts; Sara Ehrhardt
Committee website
