= Toronto City Council 2018–2022 =

2018-2022 Toronto City Council
←	2014-2018	2022-2026	→

Overview
- Legislative body: Toronto City Council
- Meeting place: Toronto City Hall
- Term: December 1, 2018 – November 15, 2022
- Election: 2018 Toronto municipal election
- Website: www.toronto.ca/council

City Council
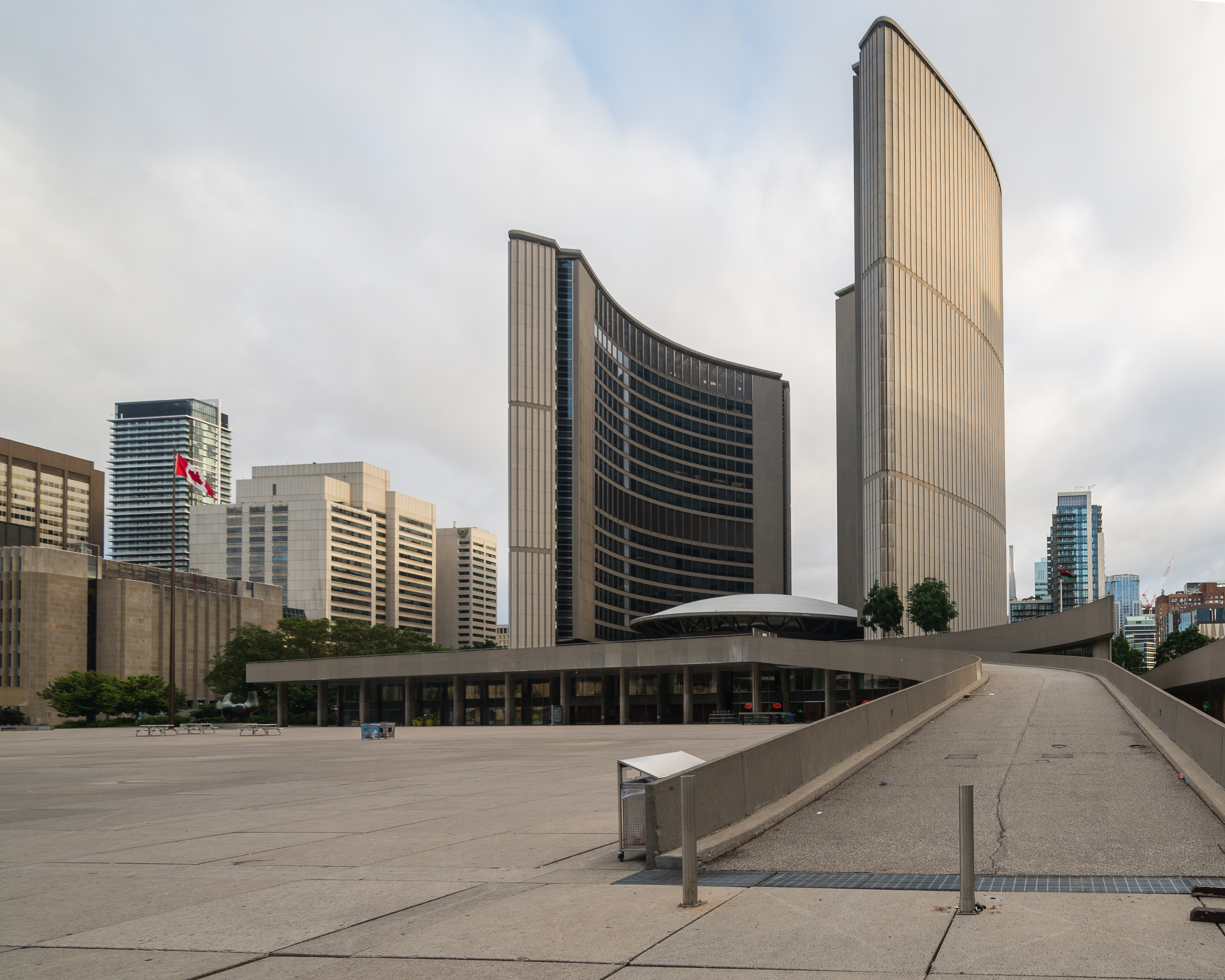
- Toronto City Hall is the seat of government
- Members: 26
- Mayor (head of council): John Tory
- Deputy Mayor: Denzil Minnan-Wong
- Speaker: Frances Nunziata
- Deputy Speaker: Shelley Carroll

The 2018-2022 Toronto City Council consists of councillors elected in the 2018 municipal election. The current council term began on December 4, 2018.

In 2018, the Mayor's salary was $192,503 and Councillors was $114,306.

== Leadership ==
The Mayor of Toronto for this term (2018-2022) is John Tory.

== Composition ==
Members of Toronto City Council, 2018–2022 term
Ward (Community Councils)	Incumbent	Notes
Mayor	John Tory	
1 Etobicoke North (Etobicoke and York)	Michael Ford	Resigned on June 15, 2022, to run for a provincial parliament seat; the seat remained vacant until June 24, 2022.
1 Etobicoke North (Etobicoke and York)	Rosemarie Bryan	Appointed to this seat on June 24, 2022, but resigned hours after her appointment on the same day due to controversy over past anti-LGBTQ sentiments on social media. The seat remained vacant again until August 15, 2022.
1 Etobicoke North (Etobicoke and York)	Rose Milczyn	Appointed to this seat on August 15, 2022, for the remainder of the council term.
2 Etobicoke Centre (Etobicoke and York)	Stephen Holyday	
3 Etobicoke—Lakeshore (Etobicoke and York)	Mark Grimes	
4 Parkdale—High Park (Toronto and East York)	Gord Perks	
5 York South—Weston (Etobicoke and York)	Frances Nunziata	Speaker
6 York Centre (North York)	James Pasternak	
7 Humber River—Black Creek (North York)	Anthony Perruzza	
8 Eglinton—Lawrence (North York)	Mike Colle	
9 Davenport (Toronto and East York)	Ana Bailão	
10 Spadina—Fort York (Toronto and East York)	Joe Cressy	Resigned on April 30, 2022, after accepting a position at George Brown College; the seat remained vacant until May 31, 2022.
10 Spadina—Fort York (Toronto and East York)	Joe Mihevc	Appointed to this seat on June 1, 2022, for the remainder of the council term.
11 University—Rosedale (Toronto and East York)	Mike Layton	
12 Toronto—St. Paul's (Toronto and East York)	Josh Matlow	
13 Toronto Centre (Toronto and East York)	Kristyn Wong-Tam	Resigned on May 4, 2022, to run for a provincial parliament seat; the seat remained vacant until May 31, 2022.
13 Toronto Centre (Toronto and East York)	Robin Buxton Potts	Appointed to this seat on June 1, 2022, for the remainder of the council term.
14 Toronto—Danforth (Toronto and East York)	Paula Fletcher	
15 Don Valley West (North York)	Jaye Robinson	
16 Don Valley East (North York)	Denzil Minnan-Wong	Deputy Mayor
17 Don Valley North (North York)	Shelley Carroll	Deputy Speaker
18 Willowdale (North York)	John Filion	
19 Beaches—East York (Toronto and East York)	Brad Bradford	
20 Scarborough Southwest (Scarborough)	Gary Crawford	
21 Scarborough Centre (Scarborough)	Michael Thompson	
22 Scarborough—Agincourt (Scarborough)	Jim Karygiannis	Removed from office thrice due to 2018 municipal election-related controversy, with his final removal on September 24, 2020.
22 Scarborough—Agincourt (Scarborough)	Nick Mantas	Assumed the office on January 18, 2021, after being elected in a by-election three days earlier.
23 Scarborough North (Scarborough)	Cynthia Lai	Died in office on October 21, 2022, three days before the 2022 municipal election of which she is a participant; seat remained vacant until the end of council term.
24 Scarborough—Guildwood (Scarborough)	Paul Ainslie	
25 Scarborough—Rouge Park (Scarborough)	Jennifer McKelvie	

== Executive committee ==
Current members of the Committee:

- Paul Ainslie
- Ana Bailão
- Gary Crawford
- Denzil Minnan-Wong
- Frances Nunziata
- James Pasternak
- Michael Thompson
- John Tory (Chair)
