= Scarborough—Rouge Park =

Scarborough—Rouge Park may refer to:

- Scarborough—Rouge Park (federal electoral district), federal riding in Toronto, Ontario, Canada
- Scarborough—Rouge Park (provincial electoral district), provincial riding in Toronto, Ontario, Canada
- Ward 25 Scarborough—Rouge Park, municipal ward in Toronto, Ontario, Canada
