= Scarborough—Guildwood =

Scarborough—Guildwood may refer to:

- Scarborough—Guildwood (federal electoral district), federal riding in Toronto, Ontario, Canada
- Scarborough—Guildwood (provincial electoral district), provincial riding in Toronto, Ontario, Canada
- Ward 24 Scarborough—Guildwood, municipal ward in Toronto, Ontario, Canada
