= Toronto City Council 2014–2018 =

2014-2018 Toronto City Council
←	2010-2014	2018-2022	→

Overview
- Legislative body: Toronto City Council
- Meeting place: Toronto City Hall
- Term: December 1, 2014 –
- Election: 2014 Toronto municipal election
- Website: www.toronto.ca/council

City Council
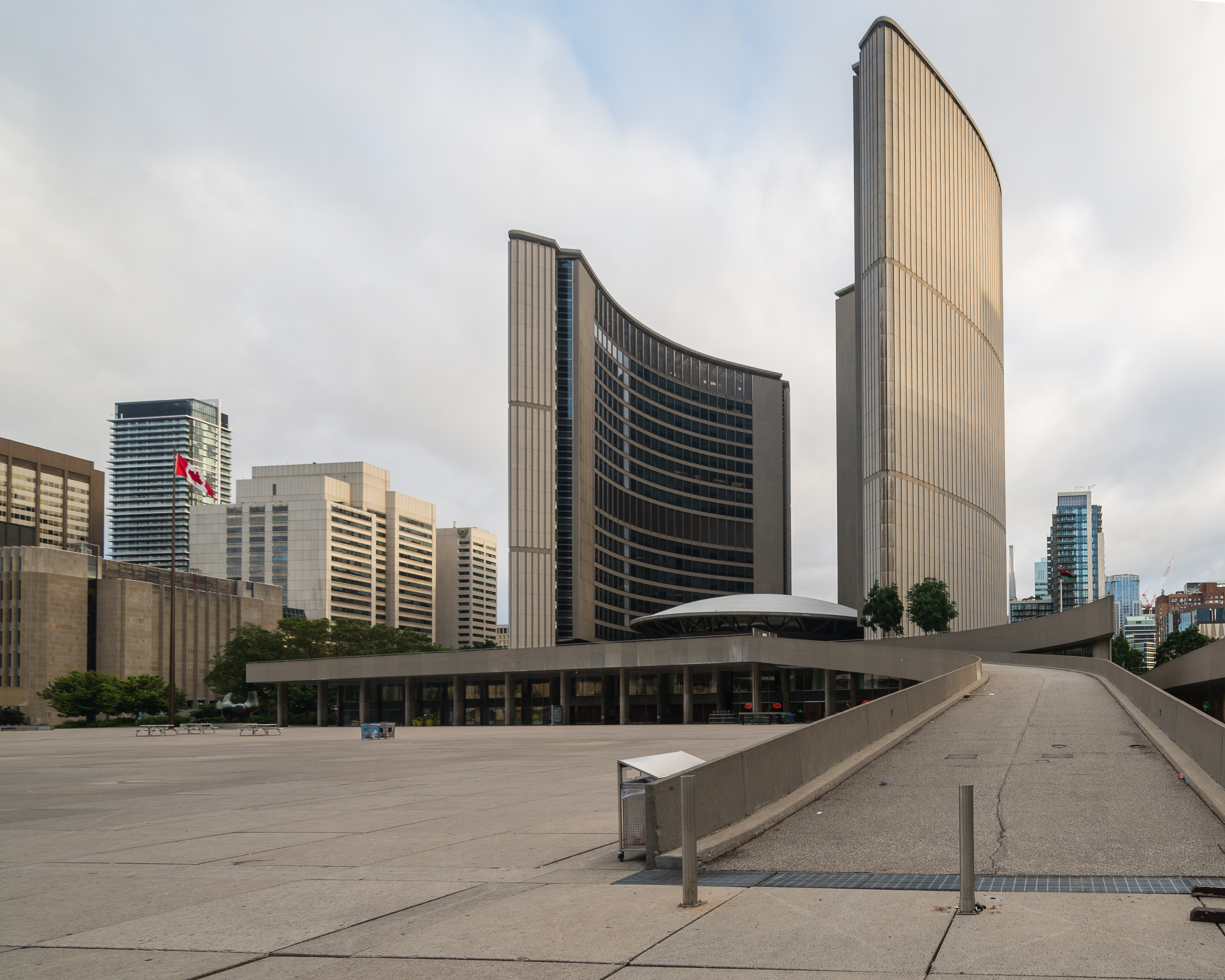
- Toronto City Hall is the seat of government
- Members: 26
- Mayor (head of council): John Tory (since 2014)
- Deputy Mayor: Denzil Minnan-Wong
- Speaker: Frances Nunziata (since 2010)
- Deputy Speaker: Shelley Carroll (2014-April 2018); Glenn De Baeremaeker (April-December 2018)

The 2014-2018 Toronto City Council consisted of councillors elected in the 2014 municipal election, as well as subsequent by-elections and appointments.

== Leadership ==
The Mayor of Toronto for this term (2014-2018) is John Tory. In December 2014, Mayor Tory appointed four Deputy Mayors:

- Denzil Minnan-Wong - Deputy Mayor
- Vincent Crisanti – Deputy Mayor, west
- Glenn De Baeremaeker – Deputy Mayor, east
- Pam McConnell – Deputy Mayor, central

Ms. McConnell died during her term in office and was replaced by Ana Bailão. Mayor Tory removed Crisanti after Crisanti endorsed a political rival to Tory, and was replaced by Stephen Holyday.

== City council ==
Councillor	Ward	Community Council	Federal Electoral District	Notes
John Tory	Mayor		-	
Vincent Crisanti	1	Etobicoke York	Etobicoke North	
Michael Ford	2	Etobicoke York	Etobicoke North	Previously held by former mayor Rob Ford until his death
Stephen Holyday	3	Etobicoke York	Etobicoke Centre	
John Campbell	4	Etobicoke York	Etobicoke Centre	
Justin Di Ciano	5	Etobicoke York	Etobicoke—Lakeshore	
Mark Grimes	6	Etobicoke York	Etobicoke—Lakeshore	
Giorgio Mammoliti	7	Etobicoke York	York West	
Anthony Perruzza	8	North York	York West	
Maria Augimeri	9	North York	York Centre	
James Pasternak	10	North York	York Centre	
Frances Nunziata	11	Etobicoke York	York South—Weston	
Frank Di Giorgio	12	Etobicoke York	York South—Weston	
Sarah Doucette	13	Etobicoke York	Parkdale—High Park	
Gord Perks	14	Toronto and East York	Parkdale—High Park	
Josh Colle	15	North York	Eglinton—Lawrence	
Christin Carmichael Greb	16	North York	Eglinton—Lawrence	
Cesar Palacio	17	Etobicoke York	Davenport	
Ana Bailão	18	Toronto and East York	Davenport	
Mike Layton	19	Toronto and East York	Trinity—Spadina	
Joe Cressy	20	Toronto and East York	Trinity—Spadina	
Joe Mihevc	21	Toronto and East York	St. Paul's	
Josh Matlow	22	Toronto and East York	St. Paul's	
John Filion	23	North York	Willowdale	
David Shiner	24	North York	Willowdale	
Jaye Robinson	25	North York	Don Valley West	
Jon Burnside	26	North York	Don Valley West	
Kristyn Wong-Tam	27	Toronto and East York	Toronto Centre—Rosedale	
Lucy Troisi	28	Toronto and East York	Toronto Centre—Rosedale	Appointed November 2, 2017 after death of Pam McConnell on July 7, 2017.
Mary Fragedakis	29	Toronto and East York	Toronto—Danforth	
Paula Fletcher	30	Toronto and East York	Toronto—Danforth	
Janet Davis	31	Toronto and East York	Beaches—East York	
Mary-Margaret McMahon	32	Toronto and East York	Beaches—East York	
Jonathan Tsao	33	North York	Don Valley East	Appointed by City Council after resignation by Shelley Carroll.
Denzil Minnan-Wong	34	North York	Don Valley East	
Michelle Berardinetti	35	Scarborough	Scarborough Southwest	
Gary Crawford	36	Scarborough	Scarborough Southwest	
Michael Thompson	37	Scarborough	Scarborough Centre	
Glenn De Baeremaeker	38	Scarborough	Scarborough Centre	
Jim Karygiannis	39	Scarborough	Scarborough—Agincourt	
Norm Kelly	40	Scarborough	Scarborough—Agincourt	
Chin Lee	41	Scarborough	Scarborough—Rouge River	
Neethan Shan	42	Scarborough	Scarborough—Rouge River	Seat was previously held by Raymond Cho who was elected MPP for Scarborough—Rouge River in 2016.
Paul Ainslie	43	Scarborough	Scarborough East	
Jim Hart	44	Scarborough	Scarborough East	Seat was held by Councillor Ron Moeser until his death on 2017-04-18.
