= Don Valley North =

Don Valley North may refer to:

- Don Valley North (federal electoral district), federal riding in Toronto, Ontario, Canada
- Don Valley North (provincial electoral district), provincial riding in Toronto, Ontario, Canada
- Ward 17 Don Valley North, municipal ward in Toronto, Ontario, Canada
