= Jennifer McKelvie =

Canadian politician (born 1977)

Jennifer McKelvie MP
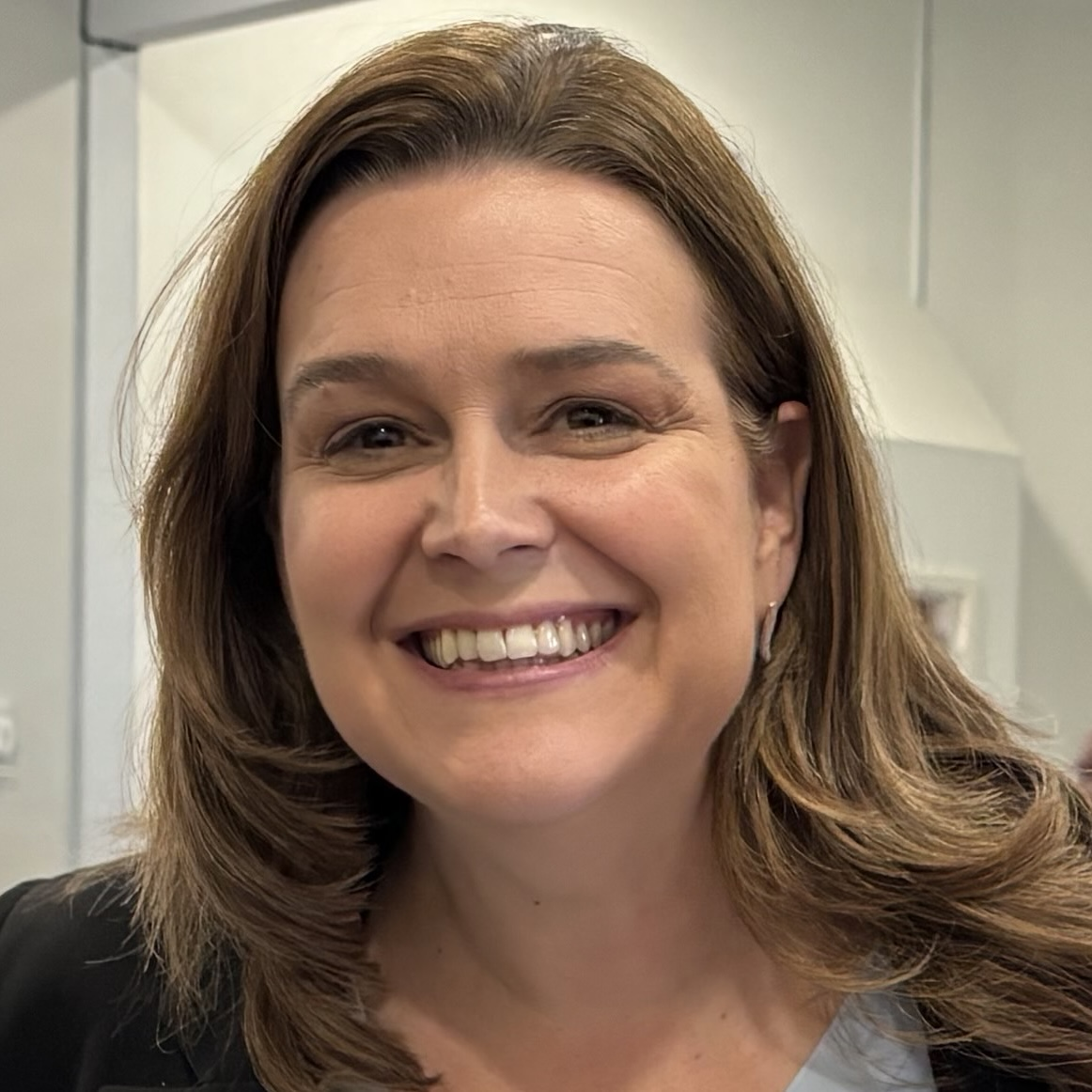
- McKelvie in 2023

Member of Parliament for Ajax
- Incumbent
- Assumed office April 28, 2025
- Preceded by: Mark Holland

Deputy Mayor of Toronto for Scarborough
- In office August 10, 2023 – May 9, 2025
- Mayor: Olivia Chow
- Preceded by: Michael Thompson
- Succeeded by: Paul Ainslie

Statutory Deputy Mayor of Toronto
- In office November 16, 2022 – August 10, 2023
- Mayor: John Tory; Olivia Chow
- Preceded by: Denzil Minnan-Wong
- Succeeded by: Ausma Malik

Toronto City Councillor for Ward 25 Scarborough—Rouge Park
- In office December 1, 2018 – May 9, 2025
- Preceded by: Ward established
- Succeeded by: Neethan Shan

Personal details
- Born: Jennifer Gray; 1977 (age 48–49) East York, Ontario, Canada
- Party: Liberal
- Other political affiliations: Independent (municipal)
- Children: 2
- Education: University of Toronto (B.Sc., M.Sc., Ph.D.)
- Occupation: Politician; geoscientist
- Website: www.jennifermckelvie.ca

Jennifer McKelvie (née Gray; born 1977) is a Canadian politician and geoscientist who has served as the member of Parliament (MP) for Ajax since 2025. McKelvie was the deputy mayor of Toronto from 2022 to 2025, representing Scarborough and was the Toronto city councillor for Ward 25 Scarborough—Rouge Park from 2018 to 2025. She resigned from council shortly after she was elected to Parliament. She is a member of the Liberal Party of Canada

In the 2014 Toronto municipal election, she was a candidate in the now defunct Ward 44, and came within less than 600 votes of defeating then long-time incumbent Ron Moeser. As the statutory deputy mayor, McKelvie assumed certain mayoral powers following the resignation of John Tory on February 17, 2023, and remained the highest-ranking official in the city until the swearing-in of Olivia Chow as mayor on July 12, 2023, following the 2023 Toronto mayoral by-election. Under Chow, McKelvie continued in her role as deputy mayor, serving in an honorary capacity and representing Scarborough. She resigned as a city councillor after her election as an MP in May 2025.

== Early life and family ==
Born in 1977 as Jennifer Gray in East York, and lived her early years in an apartment complex on the North York-Scarborough border. She attended two Toronto Catholic District School Board institutions: Precious Blood Catholic School where she attended their French immersion program, and Senator O'Connor College School where she graduated.

== Academic career ==
An environmental geoscientist, she received her Bachelor of Science in Environmental Science, Master of Science and Doctor of Philosophy from the University of Toronto in geology, with research specializing in geochemistry, environmental remediation, and biochemistry. Her academic mentor and supervisor was Barbara Sherwood Lollar.

McKelvie's academic work has been recognized and supported by the L’Oréal UNESCO Women in Science Fellowship, and the Natural Sciences and Engineering Research Council of Canada. She has co-authored more than twenty peer-reviewed scientific journal publications, which have been referenced more than 1200 times. Prior to her election, McKelvie worked as an environmental geoscientist and researcher. For almost a decade, she served as a senior scientist at the Nuclear Waste Management Organization, and as a research director at the Canadian Institute for Advanced Research. She was registered as a Professional Geoscientist (P. Geo) with the Association of Professional Geoscientists of Ontario.

== Community service ==
McKelvie was the first president of the Scarborough Community Renewal Organization, and was president of the Centennial Community & Recreation Association. In both of these capacities she fought for renewal and investment in Scarborough. McKelvie also served as a member of the University of Toronto Scarborough Campus Council, and as a citizen member of the Toronto and Region Conservation Authority (TRCA).

Her community service has been recognized by the Scarborough Rotary Clubs, who awarded her with the Paul Harris Fellow award in 2017. She has also received awards recognizing her leadership from the province of Ontario and was named a 150 Neighbour by the Scarborough campus of the University of Toronto.

== Political career ==
=== Toronto City Council ===
McKelvie was Chair of Toronto's Infrastructure and Environment Committee. She also served on Scarborough's Community Council, the Toronto Hydro Corporation Board of Directors and as the chair of the Toronto Zoo Board of Management. Enhancing public transit, protecting the environment and creating employment opportunities in Scarborough, were her key electoral priorities. She also derided the post-amalgamation shift of public investment and municipal jobs out of Scarborough to Toronto's downtown core.

Following the resignation of John Tory on February 17, 2023, McKelvie assumed certain powers of the mayor of Toronto until Olivia Chow took office on July 12, following the 2023 mayoral by-election. McKelvie endorsed former deputy mayor and city councillor Ana Bailão to succeed Tory. Bailão finished second in the election.

=== Member of Parliament ===
McKelvie was the Liberal candidate in Ajax for the 2025 Canadian federal election, and was elected to the House of Commons on April 28, 2025, defeating Conservative candidate Greg Brady, a local radio host. In June 2025, McKelvie was named Parliamentary Secretary to the Minister of Housing and Infrastructure.

In the 2026 Toronto mayoral election, McKelvie endorsed Councillor Brad Bradford. Commentators noted that McKelvie was served as deputy mayor under Bradford's opponent, Mayor Chow. Bradford finished second to Chow.

== Electoral record ==
2025 Canadian federal election: Ajax
Party	Candidate	Votes	%	±%
Liberal	Jennifer McKelvie	36,975	56.32	−0.51
Conservative	Greg Brady	25,658	39.08	+12.48
New Democratic	Kyle Forster	1,762	2.68	−11.36
Centrist	Faisal Ali	643	0.98	N/A
Green	Leigh Paulseth	612	0.93	−1.59
Total valid votes		65,650	99.27	
Total rejected ballots		484	0.73	-0.31
Turnout		66,134	67.31	+13.21
Eligible voters		98,246		
Liberal hold		Swing		−6.50
Source: Elections Canada

2022 Toronto election, Ward 25
Candidate	Votes	%
Jennifer McKelvie	14,168	72.28%
Jacinta Kanakaratnam	3,449	17.60%
Ashan Fernando	1,984	10.12%
Total	19,601	100%

2018 Toronto election, Ward 25
Candidate	Votes	%
Jennifer McKelvie	11,624	40.21%
Neethan Shan	11,470	39.68%
Paul Cookson	1,897	6.56%
Amanda Cain	831	2.87%
Total	28,970	100%

2014 Toronto election, Ward 44
Candidate	Votes	%
Ron Moeser	6,416	25.73%
Jennifer McKelvie	5,844	23.44%
Diana Hall	5,530	22.18%
Amarjeet Chhabra	2,852	11.44%
Total	24,934	100%
