= Ward 17 Don Valley North =

Municipal council district in Toronto, Ontario, Canada

- Constituency for the Toronto City Council
- Location of Ward 17 in Toronto
- City: Toronto
- Population: 115,590 (2021)

Current constituency
- Created: 2018
- Councillor: Shelley Carroll
- First contested: 2018 election
- Last contested: 2026 election
- Ward profile: www.toronto.ca/city-government/data-research-maps/neighbourhoods-communities/ward-profiles/ward-17-don-valley-north/

Ward 17 Don Valley North is a municipal electoral division in Toronto, Ontario, Canada for the Toronto City Council. It was last contested in the 2026 municipal election, with Shelley Carroll re-elected councillor.

== Boundaries ==
On August 14, 2018, the Government of Ontario redrew municipal boundaries via the Better Local Government Act, 2018, S.O. 2018, c. 11 - Bill 5. This means that the 25 provincial electoral districts and the 25 municipal wards in Toronto currently share the same geographic borders.

Defined in legislation as:

Consisting of that part of the City of Toronto described as follows: commencing at the intersection of the northerly limit of said city with Bayview Avenue; thence southerly along said avenue to Highway No. 401; thence easterly along said highway to Victoria Park Avenue; thence northerly along said avenue to the northerly limit of said city; thence westerly along said limit to the point of commencement.

== History ==
=== 2018 boundary adjustment ===
Toronto municipal ward boundaries were significantly modified in 2018 during the election campaign. Ultimately the new ward structure was used and later upheld by the Supreme Court of Canada in 2021.

== Councillors ==
Council term	Member
2018–2022	Shelley Carroll
2022–2026	Shelley Carroll
2026–2030	Shelley Carroll

== Election results ==
2026 Toronto municipal election

Candidate	Votes	%	minus
Shelley Carroll (X)	19,042	62.02	9.77 ▼
Sabrina Zuniga	4,130	13.45	–
Jeffery Adamson	2,314	7.54	–
Hong Xiao	2,011	6.55	–
Hassan Mubarak Noor Mohamed	1,974	6.43	–
Roy Samathanam	732	2.38	–
Jethro Adir Kavod	498	1.62	–

2022 Toronto municipal election

Candidate	Vote	%
Shelley Carroll	12,897	71.79
Daryl Christoff	2,429	13.52
Calvin Xu	1,367	7.61
Angela Lindow	577	3.21
Justin Knott	409	2.28
Sandakie Ekanayake	286	1.59

2018 Toronto municipal election

Candidate	Votes	Percentage
Shelley Carroll	10,554	40.44%
Christina Liu	7,552	28.94%
Ken Lister	3,410	13.07%
Steven Chen	2,095	8.03%
Ian Hanecak	879	3.37%
Erin O'Connor	453	1.74%
Kostas Kokkinakis	438	1.68%
Stella Kargiannakis	413	1.58%
Kasra Gharibi	305	1.17%

== See also ==
- Municipal elections in Canada
- Municipal government of Toronto
- List of Toronto municipal elections
