= Toronto City Council =

Governing body of Toronto

- 2026–2030 term
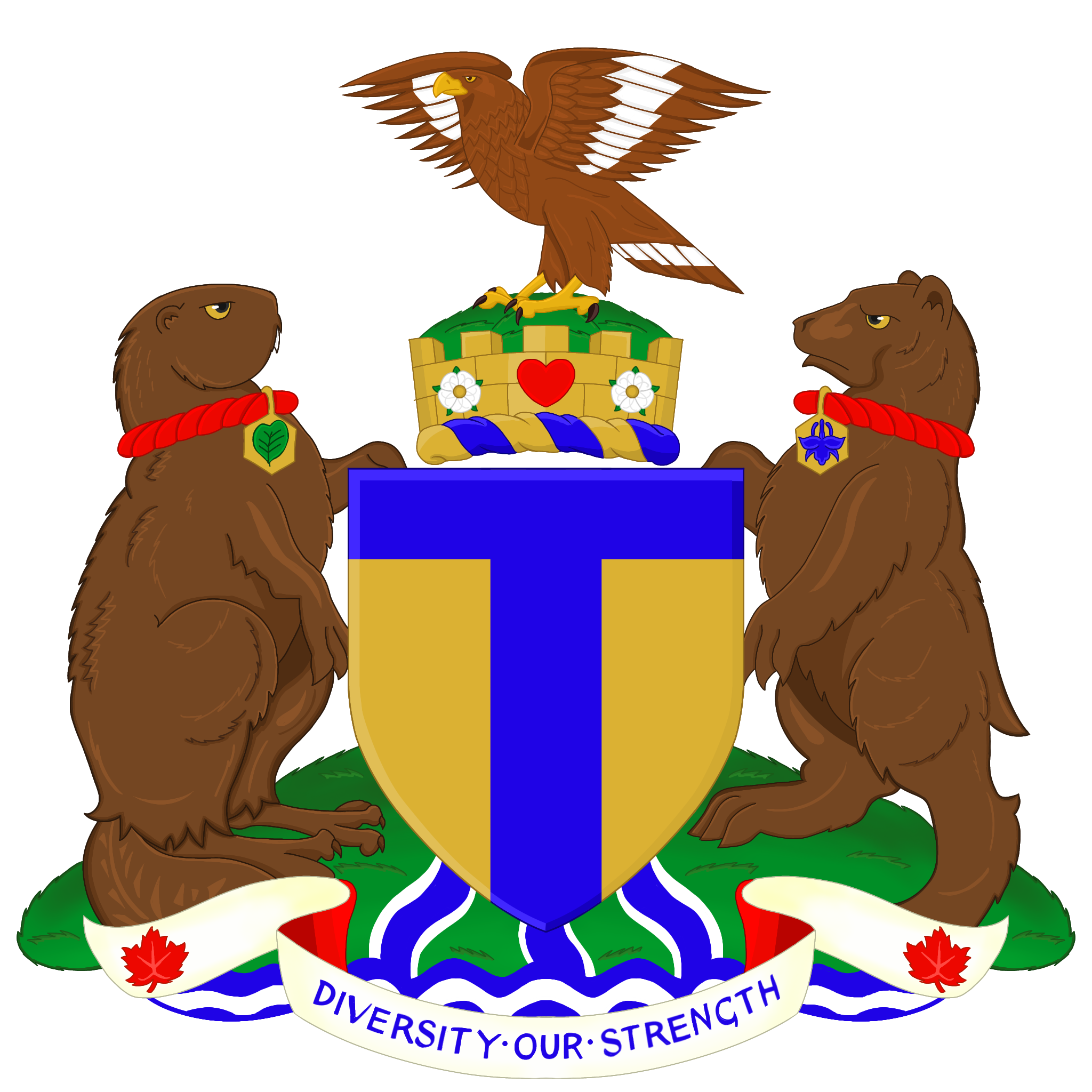
- Coat of arms of Toronto

Type
- Type: Unicameral city council

History
- Established: 1998
- New session started: November 15, 2026

Leadership
- Mayor (head of council): Olivia Chow since July 12, 2023
- Statutory Deputy Mayor: Ausma Malik since August 10, 2023
- Speaker: Ausma Malik since November 18, 2026
- Deputy Speaker: Shelley Carroll since November 18, 2026

Structure
- Seats: 25 plus Mayor
- Length of term: 4 years
- Authority: City of Toronto Act, 2006
- Salary: $173,693.52 (councillor) $235,850.94 (mayor)

Elections
- Last election: October 26, 2026 (25 seats)
- Next election: October 28, 2030 (25 seats)

Meeting place
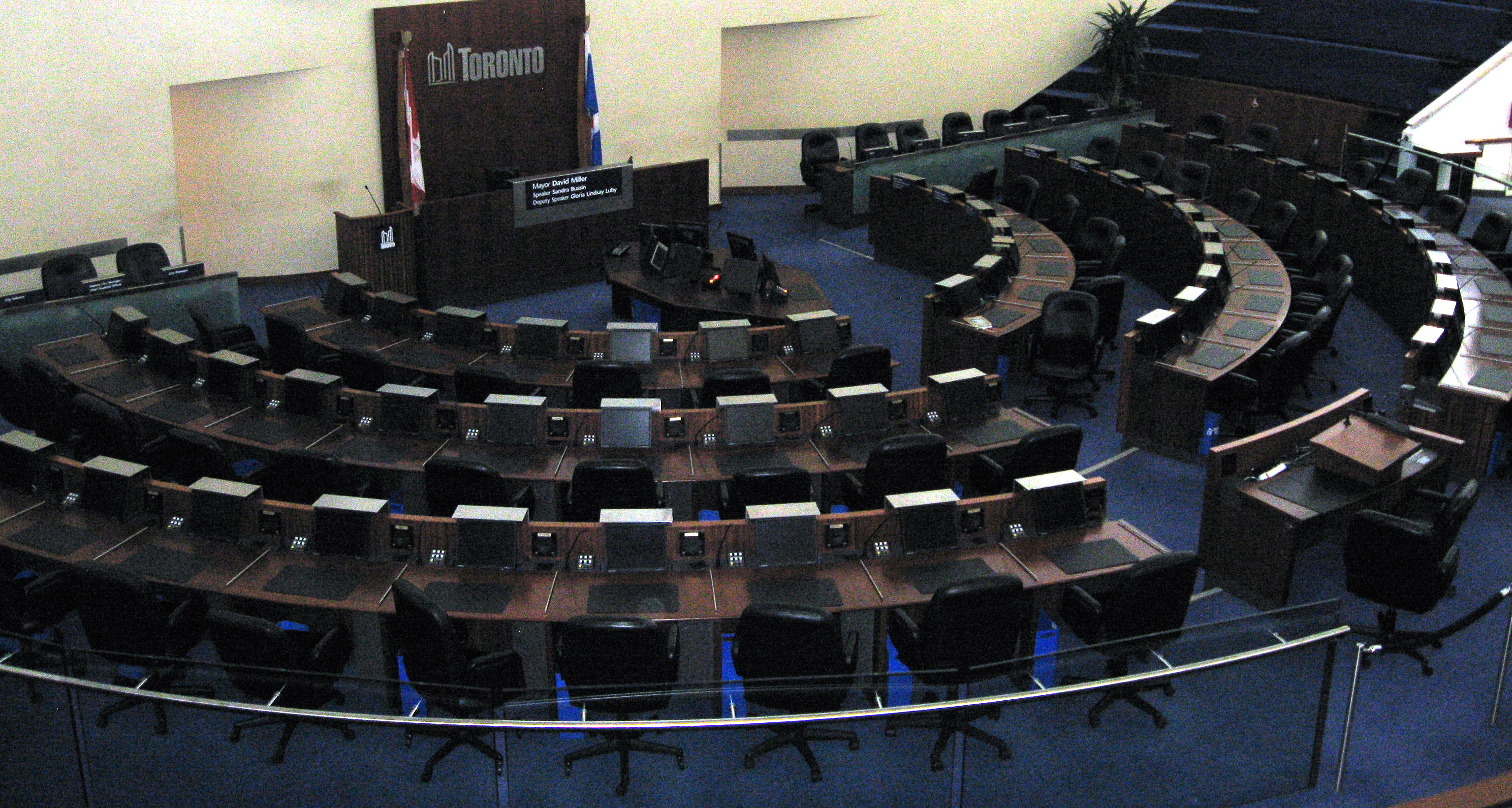
- Council Chamber; Toronto City Hall; Toronto, Ontario

Website
- toronto.ca/city-government/council

Toronto City Council is the governing body of the municipal government of Toronto, Ontario. Meeting at Toronto City Hall, it comprises 25 city councillors and the mayor of Toronto. The current 2026–2030 term began on November 15, 2026.

== Structure ==
The current decision-making framework and committee structure at the City of Toronto was established by the City of Toronto Act, 2006, and the Strong Mayors, Building Homes Act. The decision-making process at the City of Toronto involves committees that report to City Council. The mayor forms and dissolved committees, assigns their functions, appoints the chairs and vice-chairs, and serves as an ex officio member of each committee. Committees propose, review and debate policies and recommendations before their arrival at City Council for debate. The public can make deputations on policy at committees but not to City Council unless required by law.

There are three types of committees at the City of Toronto: the executive committee, four other standing committees, and special committees of council.

=== Executive committee ===
The executive committee is an advisory body chaired by the mayor. The executive committee is composed of the mayor, deputy mayor, and the chairs of the four standing committees who are appointed by the mayor and three "at-large" members appointed by City Council. The role of the executive committee is to set the City of Toronto's priorities, manage financial planning and budgeting, labour relations, human resources, and the operation of City Council. The committee existed in the old City of Toronto beginning in 1969. Before that Toronto had a Board of Control, as did former cities North York and Etobicoke.

The executive committee makes recommendations to city council on:

- strategic policy and priorities
- governance policy and structure
- financial planning and budgeting
- fiscal policy (revenue and tax policies)
- intergovernmental and international relations
- Council operation
- Human resources and labour relations

Executive Committee
Chair; Olivia Chow; Mayor	Vice-chair; Ausma Malik; Deputy Mayor
Members: Paul Ainslie; Alejandra Bravo; Shelley Carroll; Mike Colle; Nate Erskine-Smith; Mike Layton; Josh Matlow; Amber Morley; Michael Thompson
Committee website

=== Other committees ===
Following the provincial government's decision to reduce the size of Toronto City Council in 2018, the city's committee structure was reorganized. Four standing policy committees were established for the 2018–2022 term, replacing several of the committees that had operated before the reduction in council size.

On 19 November 2026, Mayor Olivia Chow established a revised committee structure for the 2026–2030 council term. The Economic and Community Development Committee was replaced by separate Economic Development and Culture and Community and Social Services committees, while the General Government Committee was renamed the General Government and Service Excellence Committee. The number of standing policy committees increased from four to five.

The five standing policy committees for the 2026–2030 term are:

Committee	Focus
Economic Development and Culture	Economic prosperity, workforce development, local businesses, culture and strengthening the economy. Also considers annual reports from external economic development and culture bodies.
Community and Social Services	Community wellbeing, social and emergency services, parks and recreation, renter issues, licensing, community development and benefits, and social inclusion.
General Government and Service Excellence	Administrative operations of the City, including procurement, City assets and technology, customer service improvement and organizational effectiveness.
Infrastructure and Environment	Infrastructure needs and services, ravines and forestry, and the sustainable use of the environment.
Planning and Housing	Urban planning, property standards, growth, and housing development and services.

The five special committees established for the 2026–2030 term are:

Committee	Focus
Audit Committee	Considers the City's external audits, the Auditor General's reports and audit plan, and makes recommendations to Council on audit matters.
Budget Committee	Hears public presentations and advises the Mayor on operating and capital budgets. Makes recommendations to Council on budgets in which the Mayor has a pecuniary interest.
Civic Appointments Committee	Screens, interviews and recommends public members for appointment to specified City boards and agencies, including the Board of Health, Toronto Public Library and Toronto Transit Commission.
Corporations Nominating Panel	Screens, interviews and recommends public members for appointment to the boards of City corporations and other bodies, including CreateTO, Toronto Community Housing Corporation, Toronto Hydro and Waterfront Toronto.
Striking Committee	Recommends councillor appointments to committees, agencies and advisory bodies, and makes recommendations on the meeting schedule for City Council and its committees.

The Board of Health also reports to City Council. It oversees the delivery of public health programs and services, establishes public health policy and advises Council on health matters.

Source: City of Toronto.

=== Community councils ===
All members of Toronto City Council serve on a community council, whose areas contain one or more of the pre-amalgamated municipalities of Toronto. Community councils report to City Council but they also have final decision-making power on certain items, such as front yard parking and appointments to local boards and Business Improvement Areas. The city is divided into four community councils. Their meeting locations are as follows:

- Etobicoke and York – Etobicoke Civic Centre
- North York – North York Civic Centre
- Scarborough – Scarborough Civic Centre
- Toronto and East York – Toronto City Hall

== 2026–2030 City Council ==
The current council term will begin on November 15, 2026 consisting of the councillors who won in their respective wards during the 2026 Toronto municipal election.

=== Present composition of Toronto City Council ===
Councillor	Ward	Community Council	Appointments
Olivia Chow (Mayor)	All municipal wards	The mayor is a member of all City Council committees except for the community councils.	Mayor
Vincent Crisanti	1 Etobicoke North	Etobicoke York	
Stephen Holyday	2 Etobicoke Centre	Etobicoke York	Chair, Audit Committee
Amber Morley	3 Etobicoke—Lakeshore	Etobicoke York	Deputy Mayor for Etobicoke
Diana Chan McNally	4 Parkdale—High Park	Toronto and East York	Vice-Chair, Planning and Housing Committee
Chiara Padovani	5 York South—Weston	Etobicoke York	Vice-Chair, Audit Committee; Chair, Toronto Accessibility Advisory Committee
James Pasternak	6 York Centre	North York	
Anthony Perruzza	7 Humber River—Black Creek	North York	
Mike Colle	8 Eglinton—Lawrence	North York	Deputy Mayor for North York; Vice-Chair, Infrastructure and Environment Committee
Alejandra Bravo	9 Davenport	Toronto and East York	Chair, Community and Social Services Committee; Vice-Chair, Striking Committee; Chair, Long-Term Care Committee of Management
Ausma Malik	10 Spadina—Fort York	Toronto and East York	Speaker; Statutory Deputy Mayor (Toronto and East York); Vice-Chair, Executive Committee; Chair, Civic Appointments Committee; Chair, Striking Committee; Chair, Exhibition Place Board of Governors
Mike Layton	11 University—Rosedale	Toronto and East York	Chair, Infrastructure and Environment Committee; Vice-Chair, Budget Committee; Chair, Corporations Nominating Panel
Josh Matlow	12 Toronto—St. Paul's	Toronto and East York	
Curran Stikuts	13 Toronto Centre	Toronto and East York	
Sara Ehrhardt	14 Toronto—Danforth	Toronto and East York	Vice-Chair, Community and Social Services Committee; Vice-Chair, Civic Appointments Committee
Rachel Chernos Lin	15 Don Valley West	North York	Vice-Chair, General Government and Service Excellence Committee
Jon Burnside	16 Don Valley East	North York	
Shelley Carroll	17 Don Valley North	North York	Deputy Speaker; Budget Chief
Lily Cheng	18 Willowdale	North York	
Nate Erskine-Smith	19 Beaches—East York	Toronto and East York	Chair, Planning and Housing Committee
Parthi Kandavel	20 Scarborough Southwest	Scarborough	
Michael Thompson	21 Scarborough Centre	Scarborough	Chair, Economic Development and Culture Committee
Nick Mantas	22 Scarborough—Agincourt	Scarborough	
Shaun Chen	23 Scarborough North	Scarborough	
Paul Ainslie	24 Scarborough—Guildwood	Scarborough	Deputy Mayor for Scarborough; Chair, General Government and Service Excellence Committee; Chair, Toronto Transit Commission
Neethan Shan	25 Scarborough—Rouge Park	Scarborough	Vice-Chair, Economic Development and Culture Committee; Chair, Toronto Zoo Board

=== Vacancies ===
Vacancies in a councillor's seat may be filled in one of two ways, either by the holding of a by-election or through direct appointment of an interim councillor chosen by the council in an internal vote. Normally the council is allowed to decide which process to follow in each individual case; however, if the vacancy occurs after March 31 in the year of a regularly scheduled municipal election, then the vacancy must be filled by direct appointment as provincial law prohibits the holding of a by-election in the final six months of a council term.

Vacancies in the office of mayor must be filled by by-election unless the vacancy occurs after March 31 in an election year, in which case council appoints. There is no appointment option for mayoral vacancies before that time.

The process often results in public debate, however. The by-election process is widely seen as more democratic, while the appointment process is seen as less expensive for the city to undertake.

When the appointment process is followed, people who are interested in the appointment are asked to submit their names to the local community council for the area where the vacant seat is located; the community council then evaluates and interviews the applicants, and submits a recommendation to the full city council for a final vote. The full council can, however, reject the community council's recommendation and choose a different candidate instead; in 2013, for example, the city council passed over former member of Provincial Parliament (MPP) Chris Stockwell, the recommended candidate of the Etobicoke Community Council, in favour of Peter Leon.

Usually, although there is no legal barrier to doing so, candidates for appointment are asked if they intend to run as a candidate in the next regular election, so that the appointed councillor does not gain an unfair incumbency advantage. Council cannot impose this restriction on appointees but nonetheless it usually factors into the debate. There have been instances in which appointed councillors have done so; most notably, Paul Ainslie did so in 2006 by running for re-election in a different ward than the one where he had been appointed, and after the ward boundaries were adjusted in 2018, former ward 28 councillor Lucy Troisi ran in the new ward 13 against the former ward 27's elected incumbent Kristyn Wong-Tam. Peter Leon considered registering as a candidate in the 2014 election following his appointment as an interim councillor in 2013, but ultimately did not do so.

If a full by-election is pursued, however, then the winner of that by-election is not barred from running in the next regular municipal election.

In the event of a vacancy in the mayor's office, the deputy mayor is immediately elevated to acting mayor on an interim basis until the permanent new mayor is selected in a by-election. Unlike a city council seat, however, a by-election must always be held, unless the vacancy occurs less than 90 days before a regular municipal election. The situation does not trigger additional council vacancies, however; the deputy mayor is not deemed to have vacated their council seat during the acting period, and a sitting councillor who runs in the mayoral by-election does not have to resign their council seat unless they win the election.

Three vacancies occurred during the 2010-14 council term. Doug Holyday resigned from council in 2013 after winning election to the Legislative Assembly of Ontario in a byelection, and was succeeded by Peter Leon. Adam Vaughan resigned from council in 2014 to contest a federal byelection for the House of Commons, and was succeeded by Ceta Ramkhalawansingh. Peter Milczyn resigned in 2014 after winning election to the Legislative Assembly of Ontario in the 2014 election and was succeeded by James Maloney.

Since amalgamation in 1998, six Toronto city councillors have died while in office:

- Frank Faubert - Ward 16 councillor and former mayor of Scarborough died in 1999 (after about a year and a half into his council term). The seat was filled with by-election: filled by former Ward 43 councillor David Soknacki.
- Rob Ford - Ward 2 councillor and former mayor of Toronto died in 2016, one year and three months into his council term. The seat was filled with by-election: won by Ford's nephew and former Ward 1 public school trustee Michael Ford.
- Ron Moeser - Ward 44 councillor and former Scarborough councillor died on April 18, 2017. The seat filled by an appointment with former city staffer Jim Hart.
- Pam McConnell - Ward 28 councillor died on July 7, 2017, after being hospitalized for a health complication. The vacancy was filled by voting by members of council, who selected Lucy Troisi over rival Michael Creek.
- Cynthia Lai – Ward 23 Scarborough North councillor died on October 21, 2022, three days before the 2022 Toronto municipal election, in which she was seeking re-election. Although her name remained on the ballot, votes cast for her during advance voting, by mail or on election day were not counted. The election proceeded with the three remaining candidates, and Jamaal Myers was elected. Lai's council seat remained vacant until Myers took office at the beginning of the new council term on November 15, 2022.
- Jaye Robinson - Ward 15 councillor died on May 16, 2024. The by-election scheduled for November 4 was filled by former school trustee Rachel Chernos Lin over her nearest rival, former mayoral candidate Anthony Furey.

=== Compensation ===
The Toronto Municipal Code, Chapter 223 sets the salary of the mayor and city councillors and is annually adjusted to the Consumer Price Index (CPI). In 2022, the salary of a councillor is $120,502.20 and the salary of the mayor is $202,948.20.

== Staff ==
=== City Clerk ===
The city clerk supports the operation, administration and decision-making process of Toronto City Council. The clerk manages the administration of council and committee meetings, municipal records management, and public access to information. The clerk is also responsible for conducting municipal elections and by-elections. The clerk also provides procedural advice and ensures proper protocol for meetings and official events.

There are five divisions in the Clerk's office:

- Corporate Information Management Services
- Member Services and Program Support
- Elections Services
- Strategic Protocol and External Relations
- Secretariat

City clerk staff are seated in the diamond shaped table located in front of the speaker's podium in the council chambers.

=== City Manager ===
The city manager is the chief administrative officer. As head of the Toronto Public Service, the city manager is the most senior civil servant of in the city's administrative structure and delegated managerial authority to direct the operation of the municipal government. The city manager responsible for leading city staff in implementing the decisions of city council and provides strategic advice. Most city staff report to the city manager, except for those reporting directly to council (city clerk, solicitor, integrity commissioner, etc.) or a board-governed agency/corporation (Toronto Transit Commission, Toronto Hydro, etc.)

=== Sergeant-at-Arms ===
City Council has a sergeant-at-arms, who is present at each council and committee meeting as per Toronto Municipal Code Chapter 27-50 to ensure order and safety of all members. In 2014 a second post was created to have two sergeants-at-arms present during council meetings. They are posted on the floor or near the entrances beside the speaker's desk.

== History ==
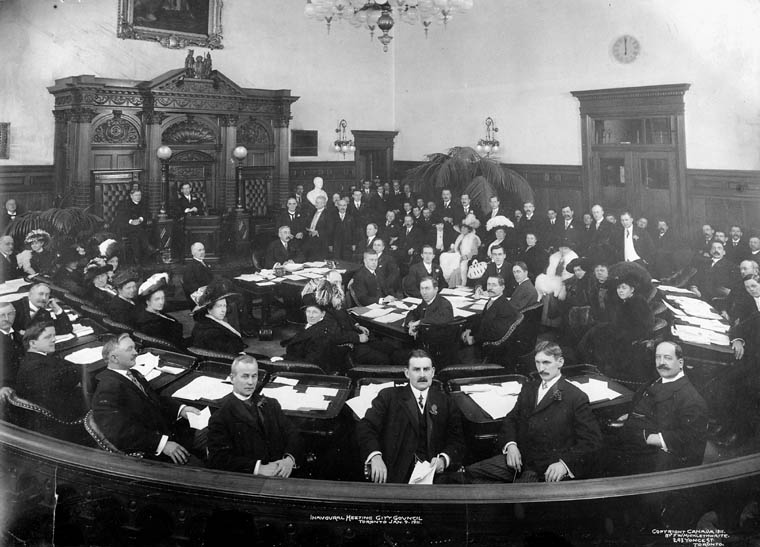
The inaugural meeting of the newly elected Toronto City Council in January 1911.

=== Original ward system ===
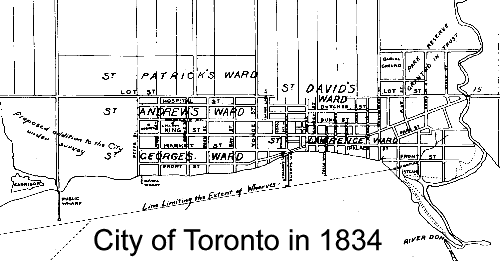
City of Toronto Boundaries and Original Five Wards, 1834

Toronto was divided into a group of wards, each named after a Christian saint. In 1834, the city had five wards and the number of wards would expand to nine by 1891. While out of use for over a century, these ward names continue to appear in neighbourhood names and subway stations and, until the 1990s, provincial electoral districts. The old wards and their boundaries in their final form, used from 1871 to 1891, were:

- St. Andrew's (named for Saint Andrew)- bounded by Dufferin, King, Queen, and Yonge Streets – St. Andrew's Church (Toronto) is located within the ward
- St. David's (named for Saint David) – bounded by Ontario, Don Mills Road (now Broadview Ave), Bloor and Queen
- St. George's (named for Saint George) – bounded by King, Yonge, Dufferin Streets and lakefront
- St. Lawrence's (named for Lawrence of Rome) – bounded by Queen, Yonge, lakefront, McGee
- St. Patrick's (named for Saint Patrick) – bounded by Bloor, Bathurst, Queen and College Streets (now part of Trinity-Spadina) – St. Patrick's Church is located within this ward
- St. John's (either for John the Apostle or John the Baptist) – bounded by Yonge, University, Bloor and Queen. The area would continue to be known as The Ward up to the mid-20th century.
- St. Stephen's (named for Saint Stephen) – bounded by Bathurst, Bloor, Queen and Dufferin Streets
- St. Thomas's (named for Thomas the Apostle) – bounded by Jarvis, Ontario, Bloor, Queen Streets
- St. James's (named for James, son of Zebedee) – bounded by Yonge, Jarvis, King and Bloor – Cathedral Church of St. James is located within the ward

By 1891, there were 13 wards, with three aldermen elected per ward: St. Alban's, St. Andrew's, St. David's, St. George's, St. James's, St. John's, St. Lawrence's, St. Mark's, St. Matthew's, St. Patrick's, St. Paul's, St. Stephen's, and St. Thomas's.

When Yorkville was annexed in 1883, it became St. Paul's Ward (named for Paul the Apostle or Saint Paul). When Riverdale was annexed in 1884, it became St. Matthew's Ward (named for Matthew the Apostle or Saint Matthew). Brockton was also annexed in 1884, and it became the ward of St. Mark's (named for Mark the Evangelist or Saint Mark). When Parkdale was annexed in 1889, it became St. Alban's Ward (named for Saint Alban).

=== Post-1891 ward structure ===
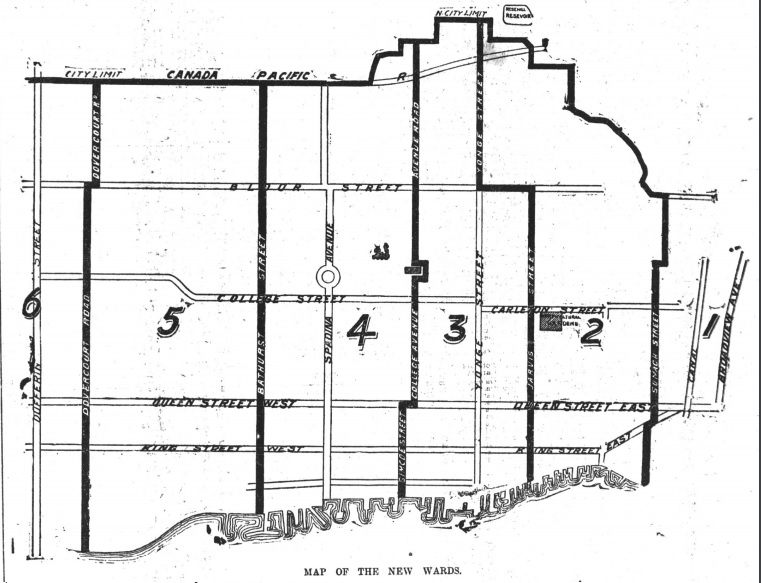
Map of Toronto's six wards introduced in 1892 to replace the old ward structure. This structure was in place until the 1910 election when a seventh ward was added. Published in The Globe, 1 January 1892

In June 1891, the city approved a re-organization to Council changing the number of wards to six; each ward was known by a number. Each ward elected four aldermen. Over the next three decades three new wards were added, one each in the north, east, and west, as new areas were annexed to the City of Toronto. In 1896, the Board of Control executive branch of Council was established to handle all daily council business and report to Council. Mayor Robert John Fleming presided over the first Board of Control.

Eventually, the numbers of aldermen was reduced to two aldermen per ward as the number of wards was increased. When a higher level of municipal government, Metro Toronto, was introduced in 1953, the alderman with the most votes of the two elected councillors from each ward was also a member of Metro Council.

Until 1955 municipal elections were held annually, either on New Year's Day or on the first Monday in December. In 1955 council moved to two-year terms, and in 1982 three-year terms were introduced. Along with the other municipalities of Ontario, Toronto moved to a four-year municipal term in 2006.

Starting in 1904 the Board of Control was elected directly. Until 1969 there was a four-person Board of Control in addition to city council. The board was elected at large across the city, and its members had considerably more power than the city councillors. In 1969, the Board of Control was abolished and the four controllers were replaced by four new councillors from two new wards. The ward map was rebalanced to give more equitable representation.

In 1985, the system of electing Metro councillors was changed so that two separate ballots were held in each ward, one for the city the other for Metro. In the next election, a separate set of wards was established for Metro councillors. Each Metro ward consisted of two city wards, each electing only one councillor.

With the amalgamation of the City of Toronto with the suburban municipalities of Metro in 1997, the councils of the six former cities were abolished. The new council for the "megacity" kept the ward map of Metro Toronto but doubled the number of councillors by adopting the system of electing two councillors from each ward. East York had only one ward and was thus greatly underrepresented. Former East York mayor Michael Prue lobbied successfully for a third councillor to be elected from that ward, and this was implemented mid-term.

This system was only used for the first megacity election. In 2000 a new ward map was devised based on the federal ridings (electoral districts) that covered Toronto. Each riding was split in half to create a 44-ward system.

=== List of ward changes 1909-1988 ===
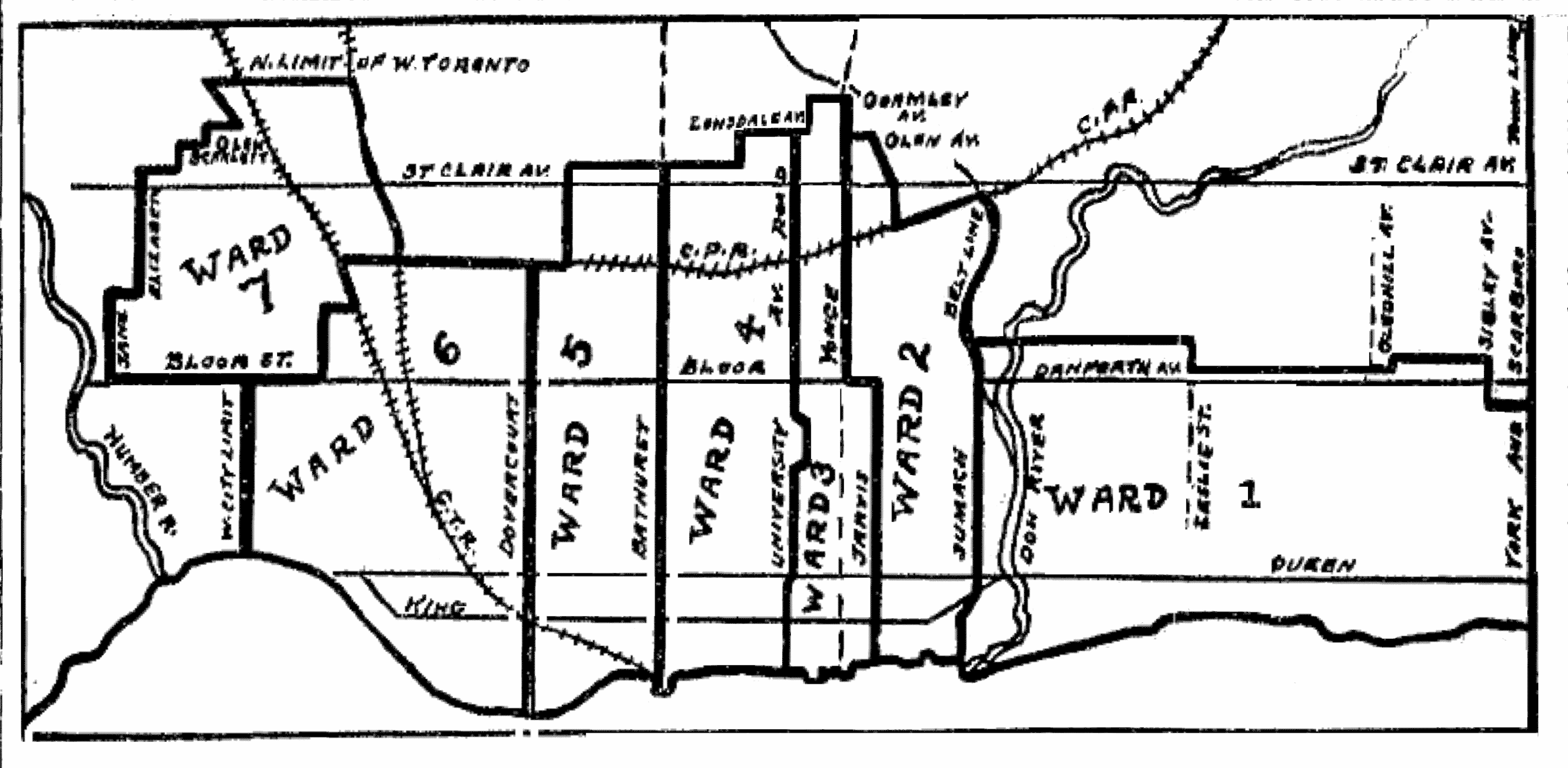
Toronto ward system for the January 1, 1910 election, incorporating the recent annexations of Bracondale, and the City of Toronto West Junction in 1909. This map was in effect until 1919.

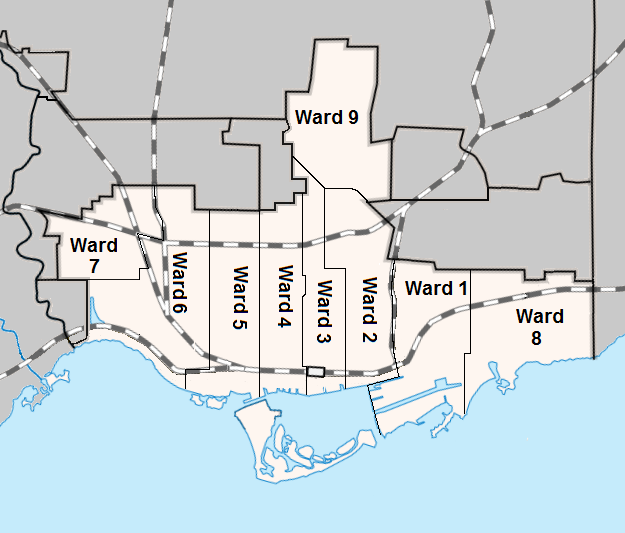
Ward boundaries used from the 1932 election, when Ward 9 was added. Ward 8 had been created in 1919. This map was in effect until 1969.

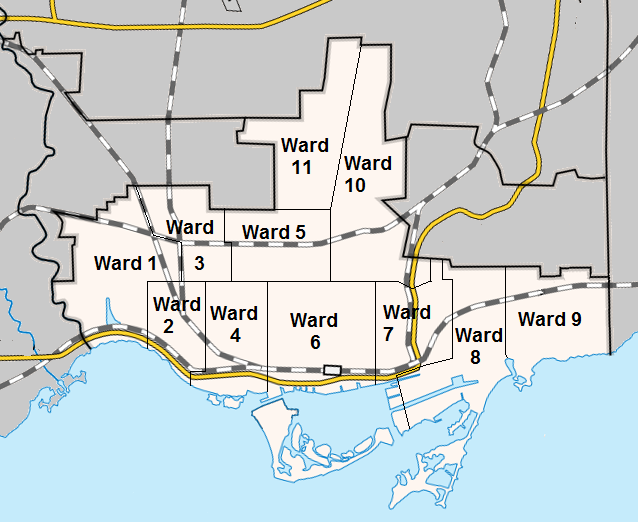
Ward boundaries used from the 1969 election until the 1988.

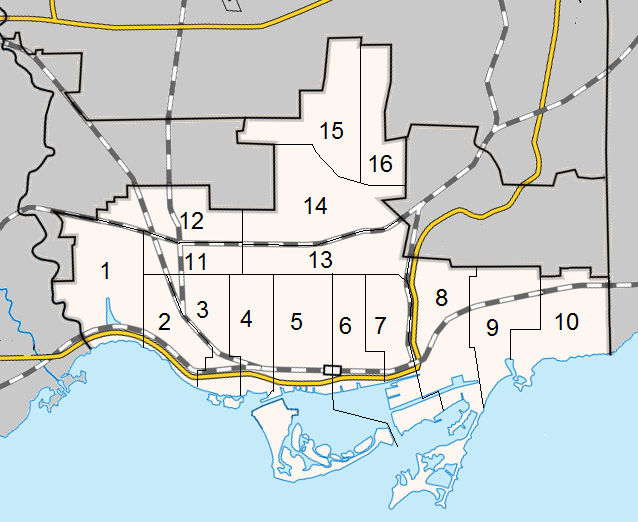
Ward boundaries used from the 1988 election until amalgamation in 1997.

- From 1892 until 1909 wards consisted of:
  - Ward 1 Riverdale
  - Ward 2 East Downtown and Rosedale
  - Ward 3 West Downtown and Summerhill
  - Ward 4 The Annex, Kensington Market and Garment District
  - Ward 5 Trinity-Bellwoods
  - Ward 6 Davenport and Parkdale
- 1910 Ward 7 West Toronto Junction added
- 1919 Ward 8 East Toronto added
- 1932 Ward 9 North Toronto added
- 1969 wards: new ward names; Wards 10 and 11 added
  - Ward 1 Swansea and Bloor West Village - formerly Riverdale
  - Ward 2 Parkdale and Brockton - formerly East Downtown and Rosedale
  - Ward 3 Davenport and Corsa Italia - formerly West Downtown and Summerhill
  - Ward 4 Trinity-Bellwoods Little Italy - formerly The Annex, Kensington Market and Garment District
  - Ward 5 The Annex and Yorkville - formerly Trinity-Bellwoods
  - Ward 6 Financial District, University of Toronto - formerly Davenport and Parkdale
  - Ward 7 Regent Park and Riverdale - formerly West Toronto Junction
  - Ward 8 Riverdale - formerly East Toronto
  - Ward 9 The Beaches - formerly North Toronto
  - Ward 10 Rosedale and North Toronto
  - Ward 11 Forest Hill and North Toronto
- 1988 wards: wards renamed; Wards 12 to 16 added
  - Ward 1 Swansea and Bloor West Village
  - Ward 2 Parkdale
  - Ward 3 Brockton
  - Ward 4 Trinity-Bellwoods and Little Italy
  - Ward 5 Financial District and University of Toronto
  - Ward 6 Downtown East
  - Ward 7 Regent Park and Cabbagetown
  - Ward 8 Riverdale
  - Ward 9 East Danforth
  - Ward 10 The Beaches
  - Ward 11 The Junction
  - Ward 12 Davenport and Corsa Italia
  - Ward 13 The Annex and Yorkville
  - Ward 14 Forest Hill
  - Ward 15 Western North Toronto
  - Ward 16 Davisville and Lawrence Park
- Changes for 2006–10 Council
- Changes were made to the council in 2007:
  - Executive Committee consisting of two city councillors and the six heads of the city committees (Policy and Finance, Administration, Planning and Transportation, Economic Development and Parks, Works, Community Services) Following the 2018 elections and the reduction in the size of Council, all committees are in the process of being restructured.
  - Establishment of the speaker of Toronto City Council and deputy speaker of Toronto City Council

=== Current ward names since 2000 ===
The current ward names are based on the federal and provincial electoral districts, but some no longer shared the same name as those district names have changed since 2000.

=== Political history ===
When the City of Toronto was incorporated in 1834, a city council was created. It provided direct representation in the government of Toronto to the population. The Town of York had been governed by the then-province of Upper Canada, with electoral representation in the Upper Canada assembly.

The first councils were elected yearly. Each of the five wards elected two aldermen and two common councillors by the votes of male householders. The first councils were dominated by two factions: the Family Compact and its loyalists; and the reformers under the leadership of William Lyon Mackenzie, Member of Parliament for York. Mackenzie won election to Council and was elected by Council as the city's first mayor, but was defeated in the next election, after proposing increased taxation. After the defeat of the Upper Canada Rebellion in 1837, the reformers were marginalized, as several were executed for treason, and others, such as Mackenzie, went into exile.

For the next century, the Tories dominated Toronto municipal politics, as they did the other levels in "Tory Toronto". The Tories were associated with staunch Protestantism, shown through membership in the Orange Order, and support for the Lord's Day Act.

In the 1930s, various forms of left-wing opposition arose to the Tory-dominated council. The Co-operative Commonwealth Federation (CCF) was founded in 1932. The pro-labour social democratic party found support in various working-class areas of Toronto and several of its members were elected to city council. Unaffiliated anti-poverty activists like May Birchard also were elected to Council in this era. An important faction in Toronto politics in the 1930s and 1940s were the communists. There was considerable communist support in the downtown areas covered by Ward 4 and Ward 5, especially in the heavily Jewish areas of Kensington Market and the Garment District around Spadina Avenue and further west along College and up to Christie Pits including what is now Little Italy. The peak of communist influence was in the 1946 election when leader Stewart Smith was elected to the Board of Control and three other communists won seats on city council. With the beginning of the Cold War and staunch opposition from the other political groups, the communist presence quickly disappeared. The last communist alderman lost his seat in 1950.

The first part of the 20th century was the era of the newspaper slates. Each of the daily newspapers would endorse a full slate of candidates for office. The two most influential were the right-wing Toronto Telegram and the more left-leaning Toronto Daily Star. In the early parts of the century, the duelling papers ran the communications portion of the campaign of the candidates they supported, using yellow journalism to extol those they supported and denigrate those they opposed. The newspaper slates did not have a unified ideology: all the papers claimed to be seeking a balanced council, making sure that groups such as labour and Roman Catholics had representation on the council. Beyond these few exceptions, the slates of all the papers were largely made up of male, white, Conservative, Orangemen. Many candidates also appeared on the slates of several newspapers. With the exception of James Simpson, who became Toronto's first socialist mayor in 1935, the city's mayors were Tories in the first half of the 20th century.

The character of Toronto politics began to change in the 1950s and 1960s as the Anglo Tory lock on power faded in the increasingly diverse city. In 1952, Orangeman Allan Lamport became the first Liberal elected mayor in over 40 years. He resigned to become TTC chair and his administration was implicated in a municipal corruption scandal. In 1954, Leslie Saunders, another Orangeman became interim mayor. His staunch defence of Protestantism became an issue in the 1954 election. Nathan Phillips, a long-serving Jewish alderman, was elected mayor. He was a staunch Tory. His religion was an important issue in the election, in which his opponent proclaimed himself to be running as "Leslie Saunders, Protestant". The Orange Order influence dropped sharply. Only seven of 23 councillors elected that year were members of the Orange Order. Phillips was dubbed "Mayor of all the People" and governed in a non-partisan manner. During his term, Phillips enraged the Order by accepting funding from O'Keefe Brewing for the new O'Keefe Centre auditorium. In 1956, Phillips initiated the international architectural competition for a new City Hall.

In 1966, former CCF Member of Provincial Parliament William Dennison was elected mayor. He was an Orangeman and the last member of the Orange Order to be a Toronto mayor.

In the late 1960s and 1970s, a new division arose on city council between two groups that became known as the "Reformers" and the "Old Guard". Both groups crossed party lines and were divided by their approach to urban issues. The Reform faction arose in opposition to the urban renewal schemes that had been in favour in the previous decades. Two key battles were over the proposal for the Spadina Expressway and the replacement of the Trefann Court neighbourhood with a housing project. The Reformers opposed the destruction of existing neighbourhoods and followed the urban theories of recent Toronto arrival Jane Jacobs. The Old Guard supported new highways and housing projects, in part because of their close ties to the development industry. The debate between the two groups became the central issue of the 1969 municipal election with mayoral candidate Margaret Campbell running on an explicit reform platform. Campbell lost the mayoralty, but on City Council, six veteran members of the Old Guard were defeated.

One example of the close ties was revealed in 1971; a conflict of interest case of alderman Ben Grys, who chaired the Buildings and Development Committee. His wife Gladys, bought properties in the High Park area, then resold them to a developer. Grys then helped get rezoning for the area to allow developers to increase the number of units they could build, without disclosing his interest. Alderman John Sewell learned of the Grys purchases through a resident of the area. Grys launched a lawsuit against Sewell but it was dropped. Grys was defeated in 1972, the same election that Reformer David Crombie was elected mayor. Crombie was mayor until 1978 and during his term, the city enacted a holding by-law to curb the development industry. In 1978, Crombie was succeeded by Sewell as mayor.

In 1980, Liberal Art Eggleton was elected mayor. Eggleton was mayor until 1991. During his term, Council enacted a new official plan to control redevelopment within the city. Council approved the redevelopment of the railway lands south-west of downtown. Eggleton negotiated the agreement to administer Toronto Island Airport, allowing scheduled airlines, but disallowing jets. Social housing was built and environmental programs were introduced by the city during that period.

In 1998, the Metro Toronto Council was merged with Toronto City Council. The amalgamation added the councillors from the other cities of Metro. The first mayor of the merged council was Mel Lastman, former mayor of North York. The council spent the term working on merging the departments of the various municipalities and working on funding for the increased services downloaded by the province. In 2003, David Miller became Toronto mayor. A new City of Toronto Act was enacted by the Province of Ontario and Council used the opportunity to introduce new tax measures to increase revenues for city services. A planned bridge to the Island Airport was cancelled.

In 2010, Councillor Rob Ford won the mayoralty on promises to cut taxes. During his term, Council cancelled the vehicle registration tax, the Toronto transit plan, made various department 'essential services' and out-sourced some garbage pickup services. Council removed some of Ford's mayoral powers following the disclosures of Ford's drug abuse, giving powers to the deputy mayor. Although Ford ran for re-election, ill-health forced him to drop out. The mayoralty was won by John Tory, former leader of the Ontario Progressive Conservatives.

In 2017, after a petition to Council under the City of Toronto Act, Council initiated a process to revise its ward boundaries. The final result of the process was an increase to 47 seats. This was opposed in Court by several councillors, who ultimately failed in their challenge. In 2018, a newly elected Ontario government passed a bill, after the municipal election had started, to override the ward revisions and impose a 25-person council. This was overturned on September 10, 2018, after City Council and several private respondents challenged the law in Ontario Superior Court. The judge found that the Ontario government erred constitutionally in making the change during the election campaign, thus depriving voters and political candidates of their "freedom of expression" rights. After this decision, the provincial government decided to appeal the judge's decision, and prepared a new version of the bill that would invoke the Notwithstanding clause to overrule the judge's decision. On September 19, 2018, a 3 court panel of the Court of Appeal for Ontario unanimously granted a stay on the lower court's ruling, thus setting the number of wards to 25, and removing the need to invoke the Notwithstanding clause. The decision was ultimately upheld by the Supreme Court of Canada in Toronto (City) v Ontario (Attorney General).

=== Political families ===
- William R. Allen - Metro Toronto's second chairman from 1962 to 1969, son of Robert A. Allen, an east-end Alderman and MPP in the 1930s
- Michelle Holland - Formerly Michelle Berardinetti, Former Councillor for Ward 35, Scarborough Southwest, formerly married to Lorenzo Berardinetti, former Councillor and former MPP. Related to her former spouse are former councillor Michael Colle and current councillor Josh Colle.
- Christin Carmichael Greb - former city councillor, daughter of Toronto Member of Parliament John Carmichael.
- Josh Colle - former city councillor; son of former Metro Toronto Councillor and City of York Councillor, and current City councillor Michael Colle and first cousin once removed to former Toronto and Scarborough City Councillor Lorenzo Berardinetti. Berardinetti‘s ex-wife is former City Councillor Michelle Holland.
- Joe Cressy - former city councillor; son of former city councillors Gordon Cressy and Joanne Campbell
- Mayor Ralph Day's son married to the daughter of Mayor Allan A. Lamport
- Rob Ford – as former mayor and councillor; brother Doug Ford, Jr. Premier of Ontario and former councillor; nephew Michael Ford who was the Councillor for Ward 2; Rob and Doug's father Doug Ford, Sr. was an Ontario MPP
- Stephen Holyday - current city councillor for Ward 3, son of former Etobicoke alderman (1982-1985; 1988–1998), Metropolitan Toronto Councillor (1994-1997), Mayor of Etobicoke (1994-1998) and Toronto City Councillor for Ward 3 (1988-2000) and Ward 4 (2000-2013), and former MPP Doug Holyday
- Brothers William Holmes Howland and Oliver Aiken Howland both served as Mayor of Toronto and sons of former Lieutenant Governor of Ontario and federal MP William Pearce Howland
- William Peyton Hubbard - former city alderman and father of Frederick Langdon Hubbard, who was Chair of the Toronto Transportation Commission
- Olivia Chow – current Mayor, former city councillor and federal MP; wife of former city councillor and federal MP Jack Layton (also federal NDP leader and Leader of the Official Opposition); stepson Mike Layton also formerly served as city councillor
- David Shiner – former city councillor; son of former North York borough alderman Esther Shiner
- William Summerville – former Toronto Ward 1 alderman; father of Ward 8 alderman, member of Board of Control and Mayor Donald Dean Summerville; daughter-in-law (wife of Donald Dean) Alice Summerville was former Ward 8 alderman
- Adam Vaughan – former city councillor and now federal MP, son of former city councillor Colin Vaughan
- George Taylor Denison III - St. Patrick's Ward alderman 1865–1867, son of George Taylor Denison II, who was alderman for the same ward in the 1843-1853 and brother of federal MP Frederick Charles Denison

=== Homes of City Council ===
- 1834–1845: Assembly Hall at Market Square on second floor, at Jarvis and King
- 1845–1899: Council Chambers at New Market Building on second floor, at Jarvis and Front – now used as gallery space (Market Gallery)
- 1899–1965: Old City Hall – former courtroom before 2023
- 1965–present: Toronto City Hall

All but Market Square continue to exist today.

== See also ==
- Toronto City Council 2022–2026
- Toronto City Council 2018–2022
- Toronto City Council 2014–2018
- Toronto City Council 2010–2014
