= Ward 25 Scarborough—Rouge Park =

Municipal council district in Toronto, Ontario, Canada

- Constituency for the Toronto City Council
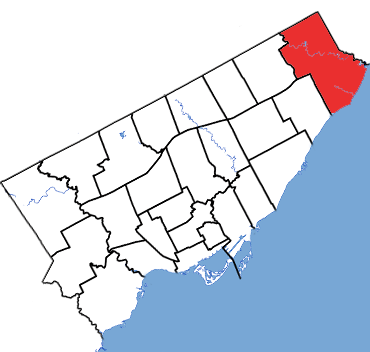
- Location of Ward 25 Scarborough—Rouge Park in Toronto
- City: Toronto
- Population: 102,275 (2016)

Current constituency
- Councillor: Neethan Shan

Ward 25 Scarborough—Rouge Park is a municipal ward in Toronto, Ontario, Canada for the Toronto City Council. It was last contested in 2026, with Neethan Shan elected councillor.

== Boundaries ==
On August 14, 2018, the Government of Ontario redrew municipal boundaries via the Better Local Government Act, 2018, S.O. 2018, c. 11 - Bill 5. This means that the 25 provincial electoral districts and the 25 municipal wards in Toronto currently share the same geographic borders.

Defined in legislation as:

Consisting of that part of the City of Toronto described as follows: commencing at the intersection of the Rouge River with the northerly limit of said city; thence easterly, generally southerly and generally southwesterly along the northerly, easterly and southerly limits of said city to the southerly production of Morningside Avenue; thence northerly along said production and Morningside Avenue to Highway No. 401; thence westerly along said highway to Neilson Road; thence generally northerly along said road to Morningside Avenue; thence northerly along said avenue to the electric power transmission line; thence easterly along said transmission line to the Rouge River; thence generally northerly along said river to the point of commencement.

== History ==
=== 2018 boundary adjustment ===
Toronto municipal ward boundaries were significantly modified in 2018 during the election campaign. Ultimately the new ward structure was used and later upheld by the Supreme Court of Canada in 2021.

== Councillors ==
Council term	Member
2018–2022	Jennifer McKelvie
2022–2026	Jennifer McKelvie (until 2025); Neethan Shan (from 2025)
2026–2030	Neethan Shan

== Election results ==
=== 2026 ===
Candidate	Votes	%	minus
Neethan Shan (X)	15,727	44.76	17.90* ▲
Shawn Allen	9,526	27.11	11.88* ▲
Zakir Patel	5,110	14.54	6.64* ▲
Dharshan Casinathen	1,885	5.36	–
Dianna Robinson	1,351	3.84	1.88* ▲
Ashan Fernando	645	1.84	0.90* ▲
Jannette Lumley	416	1.18	–
Somas Kaneshapillai	233	0.66	–
Vane Stavrev	176	0.50	–
Kannan S'ree Jr	71	0.20	–

Compared to by-election*

=== 2025 by-election ===
Following Jennifer McKelvie's election to the House of Commons of Canada in the 2025 Canadian federal election, a by-election was held on September 29 to replace her.

Candidates

- Shawn Allen, former President of the Scarborough Business Association
- Walter Alvarez-Bardales, Ontario Liberal Party candidate in Simcoe North in the 2025 Ontario general election and in York—Simcoe in the 2022. Ran in Ward 16 Don Valley East in the 2022 Toronto municipal election.
- Anita Anandarajan, Ontario Liberal Party candidate in Scarborough North in the 2022 and 2025 Ontario general elections
- Kevin Cheatley
- Zia Choudhary, Conservative Party of Canada candidate in Scarborough—Rouge Park in the 2021 and 2025 Canadian federal elections and in Toronto—Danforth in the 2019 Canadian federal election. Ran for city council in Ward 21 Scarborough Centre in the 2018 Toronto municipal election.
- Ashan Fernando, ran in this Ward in the 2022 municipal election
- Reza Khoshdel, community organizer. Ran in this Ward in the 2018 municipal election.
- Donna LaRush
- Huy Lieu
- Brian Matthews, realtor
- Jose Moreno Garcia
- Zakir Patel, Toronto District School Board Trustee for Ward 19, Scarborough—Guildwood
- Dianna Robinson
- Gregory Rodriguez
- Neethan Shan, Chair of the Toronto District School Board (since 2024) and Trustee for Ward 17, Scarborough Centre. Former city councillor for Scarborough—Rouge River (2017–2018).
- Shean Sinnarajah
- Anu Sriskandarajah, Toronto District School Board Trustee for Ward 19, Scarborough—Rouge Park and wife of councillor Parthi Kandavel.

Results

Turnout: 24.9%

Candidate	Vote	%
Neethan Shan	5,174	26.86
Anu Sriskandarajah	3,374	17.52
Shawn Allen	2,934	15.23
Reza Khoshdel	1,834	9.52
Zakir Patel	1,521	7.90
Shean Sinnarajah	1,441	7.48
Darrell Brown	601	3.12
Anita Anandarajan	507	2.63
Brian Matthews	397	2.06
Dianna Robinson	377	1.96
Zia Choudhary	295	1.53
Ashan Fernando	182	0.94
Jamil Kerr	176	0.91
Jose Moreno Garcia	154	0.80
Walter Alvarez-Bardales	101	0.52
Donna LaRush	59	0.31
Shemar Shirley	40	0.21
Gregory Rodriguez	35	0.18
Huy Lieu	35	0.18
Kevin Cheatley	23	0.12

=== 2022 ===
Candidate	Vote	%
Jennifer McKelvie	14,168	72.28
Jacinta Kanakaratnam	3,449	17.60
Ashan Fernando	1,984	10.12

=== 2018 ===
Candidate	Vote	%
Jennifer McKelvie	11,624	40.21
Neethan Shan	11,470	39.68
Paul Cookson	1,897	6.56
Amanda Cain	831	2.87
Cheryl Lewis-Thurab	638	2.21
Daniel Cubellis	527	1.82
Reza Khoshdel	548	1.90
Christopher Riley	456	1.58
Joseph Thomas	428	1.48
Jasper Ghori	337	1.17
Dave Madder	151	0.52
