= Ward 24 Scarborough—Guildwood =

Municipal council district in Toronto, Ontario, Canada

Coordinates: 43.77°N 79.21°W

Ward 24 Scarborough Guildwood
- Constituency for the Toronto City Council
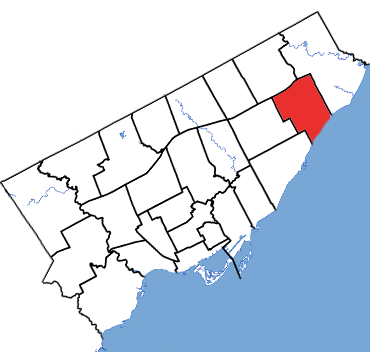
- Location of Ward 24 in Toronto
- City: Toronto
- Population: 102,755 (2021)

Current constituency
- Created: 2018
- Councillor: Paul Ainslie
- First contested: 2018 election
- Last contested: 2026 election
- Ward profile: www.toronto.ca/city-government/data-research-maps/neighbourhoods-communities/ward-profiles/ward-24-scarborough-guildwood/

Ward 24 Scarborough Guildwood is a municipal electoral division in Toronto, Ontario, Canada, for the Toronto City Council. It was last contested in the 2026 municipal election, with Paul Ainslie elected councillor.

== Boundaries ==
On August 14, 2018, the Government of Ontario redrew municipal boundaries via the Better Local Government Act, 2018, S.O. 2018, c. 11 - Bill 5. This means that the 25 provincial electoral districts and the 25 municipal wards in Toronto currently share the same geographic borders.

Defined in legislation as:

Consisting of that part of the City of Toronto described as follows: commencing at the intersection of Highway No. 401 with Morningside Avenue; thence southerly along said avenue and its production to the southerly limit of said city; thence southwesterly along said limit to the southerly production of Markham Road; thence northerly along said production and Markham Road to Eglinton Avenue East; thence westerly along said avenue to the southerly production of Bellamy Road North; thence generally northerly along said production and Bellamy Road North to Lawrence Avenue East; thence westerly along said avenue to McCowan Road; thence northerly along said road to Highway No. 401; thence easterly along said highway to the point of commencement.

== History ==
=== 2018 boundary adjustment ===
Toronto municipal ward boundaries were significantly modified in 2018 during the election campaign. Ultimately the new ward structure was used and later upheld by the Supreme Court of Canada in 2021.

== Councillors ==
Council term	Member
2018–2022	Paul Ainslie
2022–2026	Paul Ainslie
2026–2030	Paul Ainslie

== Election results ==
2026 Toronto municipal election

Candidate	Votes	%	minus
Paul Ainslie (X)	20,305	72.26	4.26 ▼
Robert Bazil	2,590	9.22	–
Nachi Ramasamy	2,055	7.31	–
Arun Sivanandan	1,508	5.37	–
An Wu	1,265	4.50	–
Jithender Mulamalla	377	1.34	–

2022 Toronto municipal election

Candidate	Vote	%
Paul Ainslie	12,483	76.52
Vivian Parker	1,820	11.16
Habiba Desai	1,307	8.01
Keiosha Ross	703	4.31

2018 Toronto municipal election

Candidate	Votes	Percentage
Paul Ainslie	15,131	66.82%
Michelle Spencer	1,933	8.54%
Priyanth Nallaratnam	1,896	8.37%
Reddy Muttukuru	1,323	5.84%
Sajid Saleh	841	3.71%
Morian Washington	592	2.61%
Keiosha Ross	405	1.79%
Emery Warner	393	1.74%
Etohan Evbagharu	132	0.58%

== See also ==
- Municipal elections in Canada
- Municipal government of Toronto
- List of Toronto municipal elections
