= Rachel Chernos Lin =

Canadian politician

Toronto City Councillor for Ward 15 Don Valley West
- Incumbent
- Assumed office November 4, 2024
- Preceded by: Jaye Robinson

Chair of the Toronto District School Board
- In office November 15, 2022 – November 6, 2024
- Succeeded by: Neethan Shan

Rachel Chernos Lin is a Canadian politician who has served as Toronto City Councillor for Ward 15 Don Valley West since November 4, 2024. She was first elected in a 2024 by-election and was re-elected in the 2026 Toronto municipal election. She previously served as the chair of the Toronto District School Board (TDSB)

== Career ==
In 2018, Chernos Lin was elected as a TDSB trustee for Ward 11. She was re-elected in 2022. On November 15, 2022, Chernos Lin was elected as the TDSB’s chair. While a school board trustee, she led the board to join a class-action lawsuit against social media companies because of how their products can potentially affect students negatively. Chernos Lin also serves on the board of directors of the Canadian Film Centre.

=== 2024 Ward 15 by-election ===
On November 4, 2024, Chernos Lin won the municipal by-election to fill the unexpired term of the late Jaye Robinson on the Toronto City Council, receiving nearly 55 percent of the vote with 31 percent turnout

=== 2026 municipal election ===
Chernos Lin ran for re-election in Ward 15 Don Valley West in the 2026 Toronto municipal election, facing Sheena Sharp and Denis Tsang. She was re-elected on 26 October, receiving 23,434 votes (67.47%), compared with 7,863 (22.64%) for Sharp and 3,437 (9.90%) for Tsang. Her share of the vote increased by 12.71 percentage points compared with the 2024 by-election.

== Personal life ==
Chernos Lin lives in the Don Valley West electoral district with her husband and two children. She is Jewish.

== Electoral record ==
2026 Toronto municipal election, Ward 15 Don Valley West
Candidate	Votes	%	±%
Rachel Chernos Lin (X)	23,434	67.47	+12.71
Sheena Sharp	7,863	22.64	+20.20
Denis Tsang	3,437	9.90	–
Total valid votes	34,734	100.00	

2024 Toronto municipal by-election, Ward 15 Don Valley West
Candidate	Votes	Vote share
Rachel Chernos Lin	12,899	54.76%
Anthony Furey	7,343	31.17%
Sam Robinson	1,271	5.40%
Sheena Sharp	575	2.44%
Lesley Stoyan	345	1.46%
Shakhlo Sharipova	301	1.28%
Evan Sambasivam	186	0.79%
Habiba Desai	137	0.58%
Syed Jaffery	124	0.53%
Dhruv Jain	123	0.52%
Calvin Xu	72	0.31%
Jason Stevens	70	0.30%
Cleveland Marshall	37	0.16%
Peter Handjis	36	0.15%
Mario Lamanna	31	0.13%
Daniel Trayes	5	0.02%
Total	23,555	100%
Source: City of Toronto
