= Neethan Shan =

Canadian politician (born 1978)

- நீதன் ஷான்

Toronto City Councillor
- Incumbent
- Assumed office September 29, 2025
- Preceded by: Jennifer McKelvie
- Constituency: Ward 25 Scarborough—Rouge Park
- In office February 13, 2017 – December 1, 2018
- Preceded by: Raymond Cho
- Succeeded by: Ward dissolved
- Constituency: Ward 42 Scarborough—Rouge River

Chair of the Toronto District School Board
- In office November 13, 2024 – October 4, 2025
- Preceded by: Rachel Chernos Lin

Toronto District School Board Trustee
- In office November 15, 2022 – October 4, 2025
- Preceded by: David Smith
- Constituency: Ward 17 Scarborough Centre
- In office January 25, 2016 – February 13, 2017
- Preceded by: Shaun Chen
- Succeeded by: Abdul Hai Patel
- Constituency: Ward 21 Scarborough—Rouge River

York Region District School Board Trustee
- In office December 1, 2006 – November 30, 2010
- Succeeded by: Juanita Nathan
- Constituency: Wards 7 and 8

Personal details
- Born: Neethan Shanmugarajah; December 24, 1978 (age 47) Jaffna, Northern Province, Sri Lanka
- Citizenship: Canadian
- Party: Independent (Note: Municipal politicians are elected on a non-partisan basis in Ontario.) (municipal); New Democratic (federal); Ontario New Democratic (provincial)
- Other political affiliations: Liberal Party of Canada (2003–2007)
- Spouse: Thadsha Navaneethan
- Children: 2
- Education: University of Toronto (BSc, BEd, MEd)
- Occupation: Youth worker; politician
- Website: neethanshan.ca

Neethan Shanmugarajah (born December 24, 1978) is a Canadian politician and youth advocate. He currently represents Ward 25 Scarborough—Rouge Park on Toronto City Council, and is Toronto's first Tamil-Canadian councillor.

== Early life and career ==
Shan was born on December 24, 1978, in Jaffna in northern Sri Lanka. He was born Neethan Shanmugarajah. His father was from Neduntivu and his mother from Analaitivu. He moved to Canada as a refugee in 1995 aged 16.

Shan completed an honours bachelor of science (BSc) from the University of Toronto in 2001 and a bachelor of education (BEd) from the Ontario Institute for Studies in Education (OISE) in 2003. He later received a master of education (MEd) in sociology and equity studies in education from OISE in 2012.

He began his career as a youth outreach worker in Malvern, Toronto. In 2001, aged 22, he became executive director of Canadian Tamil Youth Development Centre (CanTYD), a social service agency. He then became manager of youth programs at Malvern Family Resource Centre. In 2007, he became executive director of Council of Agencies Serving South Asians.

Shan was vice-chair of the National Council of Canadian Tamils and chair of the Tamil Heritage Month Committee, which he founded in 2009. He has served numerous other community groups including Better Ballot Initiative; Boreal Institute for Civil Society (project director); Canadian Tamil Congress; Community Use of Schools Council; Malvern Community Coalition; Parent Action on Drugs (project coordinator); Scarborough Youth Task Group; Tsunami Relief Coordinating Committee; and the Youth Gang Work Group. He is also involved with Canadian Multicultural Radio, Tamil Vision International, the Tamil Canadian Centre for Civic Action, and the Urban Alliance on Race Relations. He was also a professor at Seneca College of Applied Arts and Technology.

== Political timeline ==
Shan was elected in 2006 to the York Region District School Board representing Wards 7 and 8 in Markham.

He later served with the Toronto District School Board in 2016 until 2017.

While trustee, in 2016 Shan ran in a Provincial by election for Scarborough Rouge River (provincial district) coming in third behind the winner, Raymond Cho.

In 2017, Shan won a municipal by-election to represent Ward 42 (Scarborough—Rouge River) on Toronto City Council.

Shan was defeated in the 2018 Toronto municipal election losing to Jennifer McKelvie.

He returned to the Toronto District School board's Ward 17 in the 2022 General Municipal Election.

In a September 2025 municipal by election he was elected to represent Ward 25 Scarborough—Rouge Park on Toronto City Council.

== Personal life ==
Shan is married to Thadsha Navaneethan and has two sons.

== Electoral record ==
=== Public school board trustee ===
Shan unsuccessfully ran for York Region District School Board (YRDSB) public school trustee for wards 7 and 8 in the 2003 Markham elections. He was later elected to the school board following the 2006 Markham election.

In January 2016, Shan was elected in a by-election to be the Toronto District School Board (TDSB) public school trustee for Ward 21 Scarborough—Rouge River.

Returning to elected politics, Shan was elected as the trustee for Ward 17 in November 2022 after incumbent David Smith became the MPP for Scarborough Centre. After Rachel Chernos Lin's resignation from the school board, Shan was acclaimed board chair; he was acting chair since July 2024. He was previously vice-chair.

=== Provincial politics ===
Shan took a leave of absence from the YRDSB to run in the 2007 provincial election as the Ontario NDP candidate in Scarborough—Guildwood but failed to get elected and returned to the school board. He sought the Scarborough—Rouge River seat in the 2011 Ontario general election.

In April 2012, Shan was elected president of the Ontario NDP.

Shan ran in the 2014 Ontario general election as the NDP's candidate in Scarborough—Rouge River. He contested the Ontario provincial by-election in Scarborough—Rouge River held in September 2016 as the NDP's candidate but again failed to get elected.

Shan was nominated as the Ontario NDP candidate in the provincial riding of Scarborough Centre for the 2022 Ontario general election, but again failed to win.

=== Toronto City Councillor ===
Shan ran in the 2010 Toronto election as a candidate for Ward 42 Scarborough—Rouge River on Toronto City Council but failed to get elected. He ran again in the 2014 Toronto municipal election.

In February 2017, following the resignation of Councillor Raymond Cho, the Scarborough—Rouge River seat became vacant. Running in the subsequent by-election and was elected to Toronto City Council, becoming the first Tamil-Canadian to serve on the council. He ran for re-election in the 2018 municipal election in the new Ward 25 Scarborough—Rouge Park after the province aligned Toronto's 44 wards to match the federal and provincial electoral divisions. He was defeated by Jennifer McKelvie by 154 votes. He endorsed Olivia Chow in the 2023 Toronto mayoral by-election.

After McKelvie's resignation in 2025, Shan announced his candidacy for the seat. He was elected on September 29, defeating fellow trustee Anu Sriskandarajah. He won his first full term on council in 2026.

=== Ontario Legislative Assembly ===
2022 Ontario general election: Scarborough Centre
Party	Candidate	Votes	%	±%	Expenditures
Progressive Conservative	David Smith	11,471	35.99	-2.46	$20,592
Liberal	Mazhar Shafiq	9,678	30.37	+8.23	$96,601
New Democratic	Neethan Shan	8,358	26.23	-7.14	$79,499
Green	Fatima Faruq	892	2.80	+0.48	$381
Libertarian	Serge Korovitsyn	392	1.23	-1.39	$84
New Blue	Hidie Jaber	355	1.11		$1,292
Ontario Party	Raphael Rosch	297	0.93		$887
Independent	Kostadinos Stefanis	196	0.62		$0
Independent	Paul Beatty	156	0.49		$579
Moderate	Maria Tzvetanova	74	0.23		$0
Total valid votes/expense limit		31,869	99.22	+0.33	$109,001
Total rejected, unmarked, and declined ballots		251	0.78	−0.33	
Turnout		32,120	41.25	−11.94	
Eligible voters		77,114			
Progressive Conservative hold		Swing		−5.34	
Source(s): "Summary of Valid Votes Cast for Each Candidate" (PDF). Elections Ontario. 2022. Archived from the original on 2023-05-18.; "Statistical Summary by Electoral District" (PDF). Elections Ontario. 2022. Archived from the original on 2023-05-21.

Ontario provincial by-election, September 1, 2016: Scarborough—Rouge River Resignation of Bas Balkissoon
Party	Candidate	Votes	%	±%
Progressive Conservative	Raymond Cho	9,644	38.58	+10.92
Liberal	Piragal Thiru	7,257	28.91	-9.79
New Democratic	Neethan Shan	6,905	27.40	-3.91
Independent	Queenie Yu	575	2.32	
Green	Priyan De Silva	216	0.86	-0.51
Libertarian	Allen Small	146	0.58	
None of the Above	Above Znoneofthe	133	0.54	-0.42
Freedom	Wayne Simmons	59	0.30	
People's Political Party	Dwight McLean	45	0.22	
Pauper	John Turmel	37	0.15	
Trillium	Ania Krosinska	36	0.14	
Total valid votes		25,182	100.00	
Progressive Conservative gain from Liberal		Swing		+10.36
"Vote Totals Report from Official Tabulation (F0243) - 2016 By-election Scarborough-Rouge River (083)". Elections Ontario. p. 7.

2014 Ontario general election: Scarborough—Rouge River
Party	Candidate	Votes	%	±%
Liberal	Bas Balkissoon	16,095	38.71	-3.17
New Democratic	Neethan Shan	13,019	31.31	-4.66
Progressive Conservative	Raymond Cho	11,500	27.66	+8.87
Green	George B. Singh	571	1.37	+0.12
None of the Above	Amir Khan	398	0.96	
Total valid votes		41,583	100.00	
Total rejected, unmarked and declined ballots		479	1.14	
Turnout		42,062	47.48	
Eligible voters		88,592		
Liberal hold		Swing		+0.75
"Summary of Valid Ballots Cast for Each Candidate - June 12, 2014 General Election" (PDF). Elections Ontario. p. 11. Archived from the original (PDF) on December 6, 2015.

2011 Ontario general election: Scarborough—Rouge River
Party	Candidate	Votes	%	±%
Liberal	Bas Balkissoon	15,237	41.87	-23.18
New Democratic	Neethan Shan	13,088	35.97	+22.29
Progressive Conservative	Ken Kim	6,837	18.79	+4.32
Libertarian	Felix Liao	457	1.26	-0.16
Green	George Singh	455	1.25	-2.47
Family Coalition	Raphael Rosch	166	0.46	-1.20
Freedom	Daniel Walker	150	0.41	
Total valid votes		36,390	100.00	
Total rejected, unmarked and declined ballots		215	0.59	
Turnout		36,605	42.89	
Eligible voters		85,338		
Liberal hold		Swing		-22.73
"Summary of Valid Ballots Cast for Each Candidate - October 16, 2011 General Election" (PDF). Elections Ontario. p. 16. Archived from the original (PDF) on 2015-12-06.

2007 Ontario general election: Scarborough-Guildwood
Party	Candidate	Votes	%	±%
Liberal	Margarett Best	14,430	42.52	-10.03
Progressive Conservative	Gary Grant	9,503	28.00	-1.99
New Democratic	Neethan Shan	7,441	21.93	+9.23
Green	Glenn Kitchen	1,811	5.34	
Libertarian	Sam Apelbaum	484	1.43	
Family Coalition	Daniel Carvalho	267	0.79	
Total valid votes		33,936	100.0	
Difference		4,927	14.52	
Total rejected ballots		376	1.10	
Turnout		34,312	51.28	
Liberal notional hold		Swing	-4.02	
"Summary of Valid Ballots Cast for Each Candidate - October 10, 2007 General Election" (PDF). Elections Ontario. p. xxiii. Archived from the original (PDF) on December 6, 2015.

=== Toronto City Council ===
2026 Toronto municipal election, Ward 25 Scarborough—Rouge Park

Candidate	Votes	%	minus
Neethan Shan (X)	15,727	44.76	17.90* ▲
Shawn Allen	9,526	27.11	11.88* ▲
Zakir Patel	5,110	14.54	6.64* ▲
Dharshan Casinathen	1,885	5.36	–
Dianna Robinson	1,351	3.84	1.88* ▲
Ashan Fernando	645	1.84	0.90* ▲
Jannette Lumley	416	1.18	–
Somas Kaneshapillai	233	0.66	–
Vane Stavrev	176	0.50	–
Kannan S'ree Jr	71	0.20	–

Compared to by-election*

2025 Ward 25 Scarborough—Rouge Park municipal by-election

Candidate	Vote	%
Neethan Shan	5,174	26.86
Anu Sriskandarajah	3,374	17.52
Shawn Allen	2,934	15.23
Reza Khoshdel	1,834	9.52
Zakir Patel	1,521	7.90
Shean Sinnarajah	1,441	7.48
Darrell Brown	601	3.12
Anita Anandarajan	507	2.63
Brian Matthews	397	2.06
Dianna Robinson	377	1.96
Zia Choudhary	295	1.53
Ashan Fernando	182	0.94
Jamil Kerr	176	0.91
Jose Moreno Garcia	154	0.80
Walter Alvarez-Bardales	101	0.52
Donna LaRush	59	0.31
Shemar Shirley	40	0.21
Gregory Rodriguez	35	0.18
Huy Lieu	35	0.18
Kevin Cheatley	23	0.12

Toronto City Council election, 2018 Ward 25 (Scarborough—Rouge Park)
Candidate	Votes	%
Jennifer McKelvie	11,624	40.21%
Neethan Shan	11,470	39.68%
Paul Cookson	1,897	6.56%
Amanda Cain	831	2.87%
Cheryl Lewis-Thurab	638	2.21%
Reza Khoshdel	548	1.90%
Daniel Cubellis	527	1.82%
Christopher Riley	456	1.58%
Joseph Thomas	428	1.48%
Jasper Ghori	337	1.17%
Dave Madder	151	0.52%
Total	10,432	100.00%

Toronto City Council by-election, February 13, 2017 Ward 42 (Scarborough—Rouge River)
Candidate	Votes	%
Neethan Shan	4,765	45.68%
Zuhair Syed	1,452	13.92%
Hratch Aynedjian	1,058	10.14%
Dipika Patel	474	4.54%
Punch Sockalingam	416	3.99%
Bev Dixon	354	3.39%
Knia Singh	324	3.11%
Kingsley Kwok	322	3.09%
Sarah Chung	241	2.31%
Ferduse Bari	220	2.11%
Virginia Jones	157	1.51%
David Nissan	105	1.01%
Amanda Cain	96	0.92%
Randy Washington	71	0.68%
Stella Kargiannakis	69	0.66%
Sohum Prashar	33	0.32%
Mark Balack	30	0.29%
John Kladitis	30	0.29%
Mohammad Shabani	30	0.29%
Deborah Dale	29	0.28%
Khamy Ganeshathasan	27	0.26%
Kevin Clarke	25	0.24%
Sandeep Srivastava	24	0.23%
Jobin Jose	18	0.17%
Chai Kalevar	14	0.13%
Arthur Smitherman	14	0.13%
Elizabeth Huff	11	0.11%
Aasia Khatoon	6	0.06%
Tebat Kadhem	3	0.03%
Total	10,432	100.00%

Toronto City Council election, 2014 Ward 42 (Scarborough—Rouge River)
Candidate	Votes	%
Raymond Cho	11,768	49.46%
Neethan Shan	7,393	31.07%
Ken Jeffers	1,074	4.51%
Gulam Mohamed	1,048	4.40%
Neethan Sabaratnam	911	3.83%
Sherri-Anne Williams	521	2.19%
Dwayne Chin	363	1.53%
Kabirul Mollah	279	1.17%
Somu Mondal	233	0.98%
Ganesh Kulasegarampillai	107	0.45%
Venthan Ramana	96	0.40%
Total	23,793	100.00%

Toronto City Council election, 2010 Ward 42 (Scarborough—Rouge River)
Candidate	Votes	%
Raymond Cho	10,811	52.93%
Neethan Shan	6,873	33.65%
Shamoon Poonawala	586	2.87%
Mohammed Ather	474	2.32%
Namu Ponnambalam	443	2.17%
Ruth Tecle	437	2.14%
George Singh	353	1.73%
Leon Saul	323	1.58%
Venthan Ramanathavavuniyan	125	0.61%
Total	20,425	100.00%

=== Toronto District School Board ===
Toronto District School Board by-election, January 25, 2016 Ward 21 (Scarborough—Rouge River)
Candidate	Votes	%
Neethan Shan	4,197	53.63%
Jack Wang	1,258	16.07%
Kwesi Johnson	408	5.21%
George Lin	298	3.81%
Arjun Sahota	266	3.40%
Yama Arianfar	255	3.26%
Noah Ng	184	2.35%
Sonny Yeung	154	1.97%
Sharon Kerr	153	1.96%
Ron McNaughton	146	1.87%
Piravena Sathiyanantham	121	1.55%
Aasia Khatoon	103	1.32%
Kabirul Mollah	59	0.75%
Andy Nguyen	43	0.55%
Simone Si	41	0.52%
Dwight McLean	35	0.45%
Sahl Syed	29	0.37%
Austin Han	28	0.36%
Sandeep Srivastava	25	0.32%
Kuga Kasilingam	23	0.29%
Total	7,826	100.00%

=== York Region District School Board ===
York Region District School Board election, 2006 Area 4 (Wards 7 and 8)
Candidate	Votes	%
Neethan Shan	8,230	66.23%
Susie Gotha	4,197	33.77%
Total	12,427	100.00%

York Region District School Board election, 2003 Area 4 (Wards 7 and 8)
Candidate	Votes	%
Tessa Benn-Ireland		
Neethan Shan		
Kumar Nadarajah		
Total		
