= 2006 Toronto municipal election =

2006 municipal election in Toronto, Ontario, Canada

- 13 November 2006
- Opinion polls
- Turnout: 39.3% (▲1.0 pp)
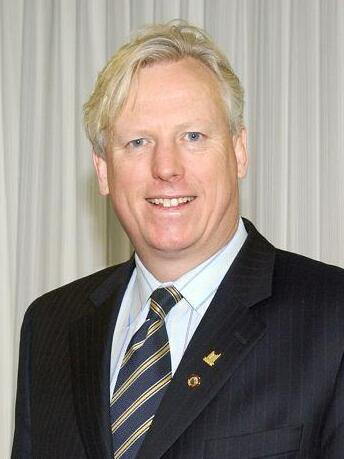

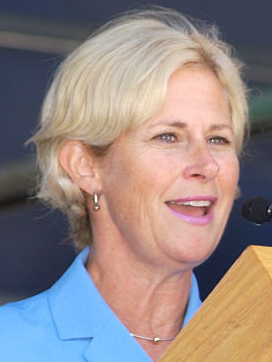
Candidate	David Miller	Jane Pitfield
Popular vote	332,969	188,932
Percentage	57.0%	32.3%
- Results by ward

- Results by polling subdivision
Mayor before election
David Miller
Elected mayor
David Miller

A lawn sign in the 2006 Municipal Election in Toronto

Municipal elections were held on 13 November 2006 to elect a mayor and 44 city councillors in Toronto, Ontario, Canada. In addition, school trustees were elected to the Toronto District School Board, Toronto Catholic District School Board, Conseil scolaire de district du Centre-Sud-Ouest and Conseil scolaire de district catholique Centre-Sud. The election was held in conjunction with those held in other municipalities in the province of Ontario (see 2006 Ontario municipal elections). In the mayoral race, incumbent mayor David Miller was re-elected with 57% of the popular vote.

There were 38 candidates running for Mayor of Toronto and 238 candidates running for 44 city councillor positions. This was, at the time, the largest number of candidates to run in a Toronto municipal election. In contrast to the previous election (which had two acclamations), no candidates were unopposed.

Provincial legislation passed in May 2006 extended municipal council terms in Ontario from the previous three years to four. The council elected in 2006 thus served until 2010.

== Election notes ==
- Local activist David Meslin created City Idol — an initiative and contest to encourage local citizens who were otherwise alienated from politics to seek office in this election. The contest ultimately selected four candidates to assist in their quests for city council seats. The contest ran from February to June 2006.
- On 27 September 2006, former councillor Chris Korwin-Kuczynski filed papers to run in his old riding of Ward 14. However, the next day he withdrew his nomination. This allowed him to retain a fundraising surplus of $21,742 left over from his last campaign. If he had not (at least temporarily) run in this election, the money would have flowed into the city coffers.
- As of the close of nominations (29 September 2006), the majority of local media coverage was focused around three mayoralty candidates – current Mayor David Miller, outgoing Ward 26 Councillor Jane Pitfield and former Liberal Party of Canada President Stephen LeDrew.
- Several incidents occurred during Ward 8 advanced polling on the weekend of 4–5 November 2006, leading to candidates Peter Li Preti and Anthony Perruzza accusing each other of dirty campaigning and the breaking of numerous election and criminal laws. Although no criminal charges were laid by police, the City of Toronto has (in a completely unprecedented move) hired off-duty police officers at a cost of approximately $23,200 to guard each of the ward's 40 voting locations on election day to assure voters will remain safe and free from harassment.

== Potential issues ==
- Gun-related crime and violence
- Garbage and waste disposal
- Streetcar right-of-way on St. Clair Avenue
- TTC governance and management
- Toronto City Centre Airport expansion, and battle with the Toronto Port Authority
- Budget shortfall and taxes
- Waterfront revitalization
- Housing and homelessness
- Councillor and mayoral pay raises
- Scarborough subway expansion
- Future of the elevated section of the Gardiner Expressway
- Aggressive Panhandlers
- The Guardian Angels
- The City of Toronto Act

== Opinion polls ==
Polling Firm	Polling Dates	Link	David Miller	Jane Pitfield	Stephen LeDrew	Other	Undecided	MOE +/−
Decima Research	3–5 November 2006		55%	20%	2%	?	?	3.5% (19/20)
Ipsos-Reid	2–5 November 2006		70% *	29% *	1% *	—	18%	3.5% (19/20)
Léger Marketing	27–31 October 2006		44%	22%	2%	5%	17%	4.4% (19/20)
Decima Research	20–26 October 2006		30%	6%	0%	?	?	4.9% (19/20)
Strategic Counsel	26–30 September 2006		65% *	32% *	—	—	38.6%	4.4% (19/20)
Ipsos-Reid	21–26 September 2006		55% *	40% *	—	—	43%	3.5% (19/20)
Environics	10 April 2006 – 1 May 2006		54%	20%	—	3%	22%	4.5% (19/20)
Ipsos-Reid	?–6 January 2006		50%	—	—	44%	6%	?

? statistic not stated/unknown
* percentage of decided voters only
— option not available/given at time of polling

== Results ==
Official Results

=== Mayor ===
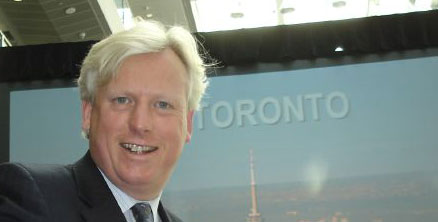
David Miller in April 2006, before the election.

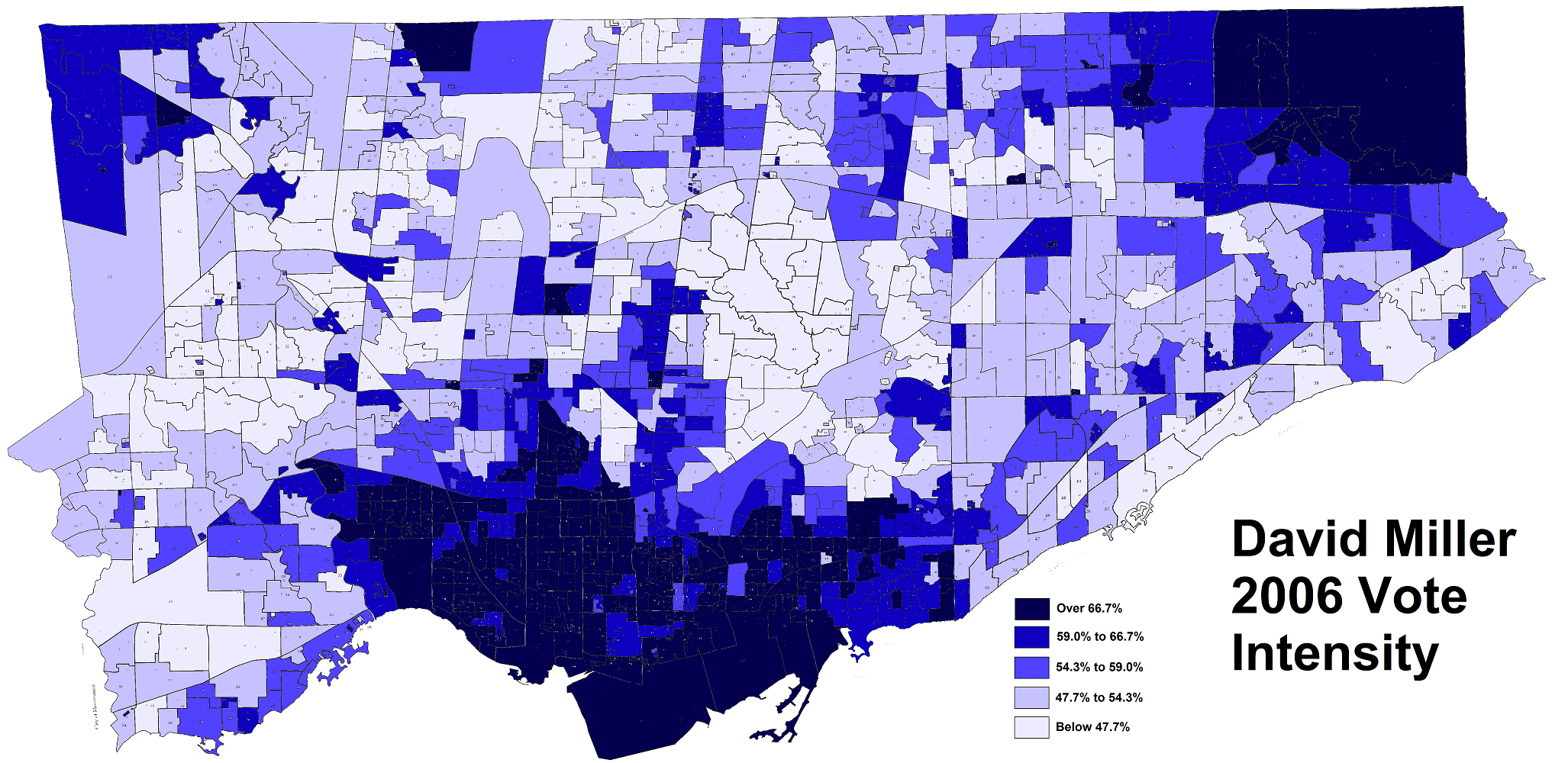
David Miller's poll by poll share of the vote

2006 Toronto municipal election, Mayor of Toronto
Candidate	Total votes	% of total votes
David Miller	332,969	56.97
Jane Pitfield	188,932	32.32
Stephen LeDrew	8,078	1.38
Michael Alexander	5,247	0.90
Jaime Castillo	5,215	0.89
Douglas Campbell	4,183	0.72
Hazel Jackson	3,333	0.57
Lee Romanov	3,108	0.53
Shaun Bruce	2,820	0.48
Monowar Hossain	2,726	0.47
Joseph Young	2,264	0.39
Kevin Clarke	2,081	0.36
Joel Rubinovich	1,642	0.28
Scott Yee	1,538	0.26
Rodney Muir	1,458	0.25
Nicholas Brooks	1,397	0.24
John Porter	1,348	0.23
Diana-De Maxted	1,311	0.22
David Dicks	1,283	0.22
Duri Naimji	1,240	0.21
Bob Smith	1,105	0.19
Mark Korolnek	1,079	0.18
Glenn Coles	1,019	0.17
Peter Styrsky	945	0.16
Mitch L. Gold	880	0.15
Ryan Goldhar	787	0.13
Mehmet Ali Yagiz	753	0.13
Ratan Wadhwa	696	0.12
Adam Sit	663	0.11
Paul Sheldon	624	0.11
Dave DuMoulin	601	0.10
Gerald Derome	578	0.10
Thomas Shipley	574	0.10
Soumen Deb	517	0.09
David Schiebel	498	0.09
David Vallance	486	0.08
John Weingust	312	0.05
Mark State	194	0.03
Total valid votes	584,484	100.00

==== Information on minor candidates ====
- Michael Alexander was 42 years old, worked as a filmmaker, and described himself as an eschatologist. His political hero was Pierre Trudeau. He promoted "city autonomy with a central bank, laws guided by eschatological principles from Scriptures, and a constitution based on the U. N. Declaration of Human Rights."
- Jaime Castillo was born in Peru, had studied mechanical engineering at Humber College, and had worked in construction and real estate. He first ran for Mayor of Toronto in 2003 as part of a pro-multiculturalism slate, calling for an increase in property taxes to support programs for immigrants. He received 1,616 votes for an eighth-place finish. Castillo promoted multicultural issues again in 2006, also calling for improved tourism services and an environmental program to produce bio-gas and fertilizers from garbage.
- Hazel Jackson previously campaigned for Mayor of Toronto in 1997 and 2000. Formerly homeless, she was a resident of Toronto's "Tent City" for a period. Jackson was a 45-year-old student at George Brown College in the 2000 election and called for more popular involvement in politics, saying "If everyone had access to a hand-held computer that plugged into the Net, we could have instant votes on major issues." She worked at the Parkdale Activity & Recreation Centre in 2006, and promoted green rooftops, windmills and "more community gardens".
- Lee Romano was a successful businesswoman in Toronto. She created the Consumer's Guide to Insurance Inc. in 1996, providing telephone callers with advice on car insurance rates. She later moved her service online. Since 2005, she had written a column in the Toronto Star's "Wheels" section under the name Lee Romanov. Romano made a successful $9,000 bid at a "Mayor for a Day" charity event in 2002, and won the right to oversee activities at Toronto's city hall for 11 June of the same year (this did not confer any official responsibilities). She held a gala "inauguration" ball in May, with the proceeds also going to charity. She did not actively campaign for mayor in 2006.
- Shaun Bruce was a 22-year-old fourth-year media studies student at the University of Guelph-Humber. He decided to run for mayor after a class discussion on low voter turnout among youth, and following suggestions that a student candidate would bring more young voters to the polls. Many of his classmates worked on his campaign. Bruce wanted to introduce discounted public-transportation fees for students, improve community safety, and introduce an online directory of affordable student housing.
- Monowar Hossain previously campaigned for the Toronto District School Board in 2000 and for Mayor of Toronto in 2003. He moved to Canada from India in 1983 due to what he describes as "political issues". He trained as a lawyer, later worked as a security officer, and was studying to be an investment adviser in 2003. Hossain's first mayoral campaign was highlighted by a promise to provide food and housing for Toronto's unemployed to bring them into the workforce. In 2006, he described himself as the "Dealienation Advocate" and said that he would rescue people from "traps" like psychologists and laboratory experimentation.
- Joel Rubinovich was born in Montreal, attended and taught at McGill University, and moved to Toronto in 1968. He was a Life Member of the Ontario Institute of Chartered Accountants, and joined the Board of Directors of Lung Cancer Canada in 2002. He favoured lower taxes and police foot patrols, opposed the St. Clair Right-of-Way, and called for a reconstitution of the Toronto Transit Commission. He was 73 years old in 2006.
- Rodney Muir held Bachelor of Commerce and Master of Business Administration degrees, and had worked for twenty years in the food and grocery sector. He was the founder of the non-profit organization Waste Diversion Canada and was a waste diversion campaigner from the Sierra Club of Canada. He ran on an environmental platform, opposing David Miller's plan to purchase a landfill near London. He said he would offer "free taxes, theatre tickets (and) hotel weekends to those who participate in recycling", while penalizing those who do not. He also criticized a plan to introduce recycling carts to the city, saying that it would be more cost efficient to bring in more blue boxes. Muir traveled to Australia during the election, to give speeches in Melbourne, Canberra and Sydney on waste diversion. He was 52 years old in 2006.
- Nicholas Brooks was one of the first four candidates to register for the 2006 mayoral contest. He was a prolific writer of letters to the editor, including one in support of legalized prostitution. He participated in the Toronto Star's 2004 online budget challenge, supporting cuts to the office budgets of municipal officials and calling for increased funds for public libraries. In 2006, he said that he would represent ordinary citizens against the better-funded front-running candidates. He promised affordable housing, more community centres, and a toll on the Gardiner Expressway. Toward the end of the campaign, he said "A vote for Nick Brooks would be a vote that says, 'I'm distressed, I'm upset and I'm disturbed.' And it's better than not voting at all."
- John Porter called for Toronto to become a "transportation hub", and highlighted critical thinking and public safety.
- Diana-De Maxted was the founder of the Society Community Association Network (SCAN), which assisted low income persons and victims of crime and abuse. She previously campaigned for mayor in 2000, and for Toronto's 31st council ward in a 2001 by-election. When Toronto Police Chief Julian Fantino organized a "meet and great" for Toronto's gay community in 2001, De-Maxted presented him with a pair of earrings. She wore a queen's gown, tiara and fairy wings to an all-candidates debate in 2006.
- David Dicks did not respond to the Toronto Star's requests for information. The newspaper was unable to provide any details about his candidacy.
- Duri Naimji was a high-school principal in Guyana before moving to Canada. His biography indicated that he had Bachelor of Arts and Master of Education degrees, and that he supported the Progressive Conservative Party of Ontario in the 1999 and 2003 provincial elections. He first campaigned for Mayor of Toronto in the 1997 municipal election, at age 53, calling for a plan to bring the Olympics to Toronto and promising to assist people living on the streets. He finished last in a field of twenty candidates. He ran again in 2000 and 2003, with a platform calling for more grassland and trees on the latter occasion. He also said he would promote cricket, and compared the possibility of being elected to winning the lottery. In 2006, he promoted cultural diversity and affordable services. Naimji describes himself as a "cheap chap", to distinguish himself from "costly fop" rival candidates.
- Mark Korolnek described himself as a "neo-Rhinoceros" candidate, and sought to bring the Rhinoceros Party of Canada back to its former position of respect.
- Glenn Stewart Coles had a Bachelor of Arts degree in Psychology from the University of Guelph (1979) and a Master of Business Administration degree from York University in Finance (1988). He was a business analyst and reiki healer, and operated a new age website. He supported constructing windmills, and opposed the provincial government's planned 550-megawatt generating station at the Portlands Energy Centre. He also favoured campaign finance reform, and supported the Toronto chapter of the Guardian Angels.
- Peter Okatar Styrsky was a 49-year-old reverend in the Assembly of the Church of the Universe, which he described as a "cannabis church". He was arrested in late October 2006 and charged with thirty-four counts relating to the production and sale of cannabis. Styrsky spent the latter part of the campaign at the Central North Correctional Centre in Penetanguishene. His supporters suggested that David Miller arranged Styrsky's arrest to remove a competitor from the mayoral contest. A spokesperson for Miller indicated that the mayor's office would not respond to "crazy theories".
- Mitch L. Gold attended Queen's University, and was certified as a Chartered Accountant in 1968. He later became an international peace advocate following a thousand-day journey around the world. He was the founder of Homeplanet Alliance and a member of the International Association of Educators for World Peace (affiliated with UNESCO), which produced a video entitled "The Last One" in 1993. Gold unsuccessfully sought a seat on the Toronto Board of Education in 1994, saying that he wanted to challenge the school bureaucracy on outdated education methods. He first ran for Mayor of Toronto in 2003, promoting a local Toronto currency and a plan to move the United Nations headquarters to the city. At one fringe candidates' meeting, he encouraged audience members to "understand the new mind". He acknowledged he had no chance of winning, and said that he would personally vote for David Miller. In the 2006 campaign, however, Gold indicated that he no longer supported Miller. He spoke against the Toronto City Centre Airport, and advocated an anti-gun initiative wherein gangsters would be encouraged to toss their firearms into city swimming pools. Whichever team elevated the most water would be given a prize. Mitch L. Gold is not to be confused with another Mitch Gold in America, who was sent to prison for charity fraud.
- Ryan Goldhar owned a casting facility, and was thirty years old during the election. He was at city hall getting his marriage license when he decided to run. He called for increased recycling, and making the Toronto Transit Commission an essential service.
- Ratan Wadhwa lived in Mumbai before moving to Canada. He was an actor and Charlie Chaplin impersonator, and the owner of Charlie's Flower Co. in Toronto. He first campaigned for Mayor of Toronto in 2003 at age 48, calling for legalized prostitution and cannabis, free condoms and viagra, and the creation of a red light district. He said that he was trying to develop political contacts rather than win the election, and speculated that he could manage a decent showing if enough people in the sex industry voted for him. He received 121 votes to place 43rd out of 44 candidates. He promoted much the same platform in 2006, and also called for increased helicopter surveillance and bullet-proof vests for police.
- Adam Sit was a 22-year-old fourth-year student in Retail Management at Ryerson University. He called for Toronto's youth to have more of a voice in municipal politics, and supported a TTC discount for all post-secondary students.
- Paul Sheldon was a rabbi. He studied professional voice training in the United States of America, spent seven years working at synagogues in Toronto, and was a founder of the Lodzer Holocaust Memorial Centre. He attracted controversy in 1990, when his marriage business was criticized by members of the Toronto Board of Rabbis. Sheldon often performed interfaith marriages unrecognized by Jewish law, for which he was strongly criticized by others in the community. Rabbi Joseph Kelman, chairman of the Toronto Board of Rabbis, said that he did not know of any national Jewish organization that recognized Sheldon's rabbinical credentials. Sheldon dismissed his critics, saying "I'm not a rebel, I'm a leader. Doing things differently is a sign of a leader and a good one." He had overseen many unusual weddings, including a ceremony in Muskoka where the couple wore only see-through plastic. Sheldon was also president of the provincial York South Progressive Conservative riding association in 1990. During the 2006 campaign, his primary issue was free rides for seniors on the TTC. He also called for more wedding chapels, said that he could reduce crime in Toronto by licensing bullets, and promised to provide housing for 60,000 people in three years.
- "Sonic" Dave DuMoulin was an Aboriginal Canadian, and was previously a candidate in the 2000 mayoral election. He appeared at one 2006 all-candidates debate draped in a Mohawk Warrior flag, and said that he was organizing a "world peace festival cyber-pow wow" with rock star entertainment. He also criticized health workers for dispensing "carcinogenic chemo-therapeutic drugs".
- Gerald Derome was previously a mayoral candidate in 2003. He described himself as the "Global Social Engineer", seeking to "unite all of mankind on to the same destination path" and calling for North America's wealth to be distributed to the world's poor. He also proposed splitting Toronto into smaller cities of one million residents each. His 2006 campaign was similar: he sought to make people aware of Toronto's "economic wars", and to redistribute the city's wealth. He runs a blog, available here.
- Thomas Shipley first campaigned for Mayor of Toronto in 2000, and finished last in a field of 26 candidates. In the 2006 campaign, he endorsed trash incineration and called for harsher penalties against criminals.
- David Schiebel said that his top priority was solving Toronto's homeless crisis.
- David Vallance, a retired financial planner who had studied economics at the University of Toronto, was a former leader of the Bloor-Bathurst-Madison Business Association, and formed the Bloor-Annex Business Improvement Area in 1996. He had written several Letters to the Editor over the years on various matters, including reforms to employee health benefits and the state of Toronto's provincial tax burden. He was a vocal opponent of the old City of Toronto's forced amalgamation with neighbouring municipalities in 1997, and led the group Taxpayers Against Megacity. He campaigned for city council in the 1997 municipal election as an extension of his anti-megacity campaign, and also advocated for property tax reforms. In 2006, he argued that Torontonians should "take control of our own taxes and control our own destiny".
- Last-place candidate Mark State was born in the Northern Ontario community of South Porcupine, and raised in Hamilton. A former marine engineer and naval architect, he was 64 years old in November 2006. He had previously campaigned for the North York Public School Board in the 1974 municipal election. In 2006, he argued that the past city regime were unable to meet their budgetary requirements because of an established dependency on Queens Park for cash supplements; and that because of its shortage of cash, little forwarding action on the city's pressing issues had been taken. Actions to serve the public had been replaced with a preference to manufacture committees to avoid having to undertake reform. His own campaign addressed several different issues.

=== City Council ===
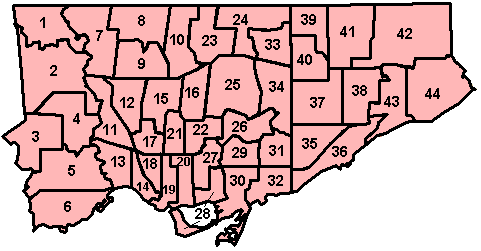
Map of Toronto's Wards

==== Ward 1 Etobicoke North ====
Candidate	Votes	%
Suzan Hall (incumbent)	4878	50.9
Sonali Verma	2999	31.3
Anthony Caputo	490	5.1
Andre Lucas	467	4.9
Francis Ahinful	351	3.7
Ted Berger	186	1.9
Rosemarie Mulhall	129	1.3
Brian Prevost	79	0.8

==== Ward 2 Etobicoke North ====
Candidate	Votes	%
Rob Ford (incumbent)	8421	66.0
Cadigia Ali	2010	15.8
Mike McKenna	1241	9.7
Kevin Mark	499	3.9
Philip DeSouza	363	2.8
Nick Nobile	219	1.7

==== Ward 3 Etobicoke Centre ====
Candidate	Votes	%
Doug Holyday (incumbent)	9757	69.8
Peter Kudryk	2172	15.5
Lillian Lança	1391	9.9
Ross Vaughan	669	4.8

==== Ward 4 Etobicoke Centre ====
Candidate	Votes	%
Gloria Lindsay Luby (incumbent)	9979	68.5
Shane Daly	4108	28.2
Sam Mehta	471	3.2

==== Ward 5 Etobicoke—Lakeshore ====
Candidate	Votes	%
Peter Milczyn (incumbent)	8501	55.8
Arthur Roszak	3856	25.3
John Chiappetta	1668	10.9
Joseph Mignone	1021	6.7
Bojidar Tchernev	191	1.3

==== Ward 6 Etobicoke—Lakeshore ====
Candidate	Votes	%
Mark Grimes (incumbent)	6472	42.6
Jem Cain	3758	24.7
Matthew Day	2327	15.3
Gregory Wowchuk	931	6.1
Danuta Markiewicz	531	3.5
Rosalie Chalmers	424	2.8
Walter Melnyk	309	2.0
Tony Del Grande	303	2.0
George Kash	131	0.9

==== Ward 7 York West ====
Candidate	Votes	%
Giorgio Mammoliti (incumbent)	5877	62.6
Sandra Anthony	2753	29.3
Larry Perlman	495	5.3
Fred Cutler	258	2.8

==== Ward 8 York West ====
Candidate	Votes	%
Anthony Perruzza	4738	45.70
Peter Li Preti (incumbent)	4159	40.1
Hau Dang Tan	734	7.08
Garry Green	371	3.58
Ramnarine Tiwari	193	1.86
Abdulhaq Omar	173	1.67

- Hau Dang Tan holds a Master of Business Administration degree, and has thirty years experience as a management consultant. An immigrant to Canada, he supports increased multicultural services and called for housing policies that would benefit residents instead of developers.
- Garry Green has a Bachelor of Arts degree from York University and a Master of Public Administration degree from the University of Western Ontario. He is a Contracted Services Specialist for the Toronto District School Board, and was thirty-four years old during the campaign. He ran on a six-member slate led by former Toronto Mayor John Sewell. Green called for more building inspectors, and a grading system to improve building quality.
- Ramnarine Tiwari was born in the Caribbean, and moved to Canada at age twenty. He attended York University and the University of Western Ontario, and founded the first Caribbean Cultural Organization in 1972. The following year, he received a licence to perform marriages. A 2003 media release lists him as president and priest of the Toronto Shiva Satsang Sabha Temple. During the 2006 campaign, he called for counselling centres for teen mothers and at-risk youth.
- Abdulhaq Omar supported more visible policing and programs for at-risk youth. He was previously a candidate in the 1997 municipal election.

==== Ward 9 York Centre ====
Candidate	Votes	%
Maria Augimeri (incumbent)	7256	77.6
Vlad Protsenko	2100	22.4

==== Ward 10 York Centre ====
Candidate	Votes	%
Mike Feldman (incumbent)	6527	51.95
Igor Toutchinski	1940	15.44
Magda Berkovits	1586	12.62
Max Royz	1106	8.80
Robert Freedland	561	4.47
Craig Smith	440	3.50
Alex Dumalag	404	3.22

==== Ward 11 York South—Weston ====
Candidate	Votes	%
Frances Nunziata (incumbent)	6469	49.6
Paul Ferreira	4812	36.9
Rocky Gualtieri	1235	9.5
Pansy Mullings	526	4.0

==== Ward 12 York South—Weston ====
Candidate	Votes	%
Frank Di Giorgio (incumbent)	4980	48.2
Nick Dominelli	2725	26.4
Joe Renda	1419	13.7
Keith Sweeney	1054	10.2
Michel Dugré	157	1.5

==== Ward 13 Parkdale—High Park ====
Candidate	Votes	%
Bill Saundercook (incumbent)	6930	43.4
Greg Hamara	4829	30.2
David Garrick	2904	18.2
Frances Wdowczyk	605	3.8
Linda Coltman	433	2.7
Aleksander Oniszczak	281	1.8

==== Ward 14 Parkdale—High Park ====
Candidate	Votes	%
Gord Perks	3816	30.1
Rowena Santos	2978	23.5
Ted Lojko	1872	14.8
John Colautti	1645	13.0
David White	885	7.0
Tom Freeman	476	3.8
Walter Jarsky	342	2.7
Dilorece South	288	2.3
Anthony Quinn	103	0.8
Beverly Bernardo	99	0.8
David Hanna	73	0.6
Matthew Vezina	51	0.4
Jimmy Talpa	19	0.2
Barry Hubick	14	0.1

==== Ward 15 Eglinton—Lawrence ====
Candidate	Votes	%
Howard Moscoe (incumbent)	5820	46.89
Ron Singer	3110	25.06
Rosina Bonavota	1897	15.28
Howard Cohen	675	5.44
Eva Tavares	477	3.84
Dino Stamatopoulos	311	2.51
Alex Papouchine	122	0.98

- Ron Singer is a financial advisor and critical illness insurance specialist, and chairs the 13 Division Community Police Liaison Committee. He had previously challenged Moscoe in the 2003 municipal election. Singer endorsed several policy initiatives associated with mayoral candidate Jane Pitfield, including garbage incineration and support for the Guardian Angels vigilante group, and his campaign site featured Pitfield's pledge on spending. He called for the number of Toronto City Councillors to be reduced from 44 to 22, and supported two-term limits for councillors. He was endorsed by the Toronto Star newspaper.
- Rosina Bonavota was born in Italy, and moved to Canada with her family at age seven. She is a co-owner of Bonamico Café and Grill, a family business, and was forty-nine years old during the campaign. She called for more active-duty police officers and programs for at-risk youth.
- Howard Cohen was born and raised in Toronto, and has degrees from the University of Toronto and the University of Windsor Law School. He has been a motivational speaker, mediator, small-business owner, agent and professor of law. He says that he ran because of his dissatisfaction with Howard Moscoe, whom he accused of neglecting the ward.
- Eva Tavares is a community developer, and has volunteered with the North York Harvest Food Bank. She called for the revitalization of the Eglinton-Oakwood area in an environmentally-sound manner.
- Dino Stamatopoulos did not provide information about his campaign, and did not respond to requests for interviews.
- Alex Papouchine is an information technology specialist who moved to Canada from Russia. He supported Howard Moscoe's work on council, but said that Moscoe "is older and may not be aware of some of the issues". He called for improvements in public transit and more extracurricular activities for students.

==== Ward 16 Eglinton—Lawrence ====
Candidate	Votes	%
Karen Stintz (incumbent)	8880	64.6
Albert Pantaleo	1721	12.5
Charm Darby	1421	10.3
Steve Watt	886	6.4
Steven Bosnick	477	3.5
Yigal Rifkind	364	2.6

==== Ward 17 Davenport ====
Candidate	Votes	%
Cesar Palacio (incumbent)	4827	42.3
Alejandra Bravo	4546	39.8
Fred Dominelli	1491	13.1
Cinzia Scalabrini	211	1.9
David Faria	206	1.8
Gustavo Valdez	77	0.7
Wilson Basantes Espinoza	50	0.4

==== Ward 18 Davenport ====
Candidate	Votes	%
Adam Giambrone (incumbent)	6025	66.9
Simon Wookey	2089	23.2
Jim McMillan	292	3.2
Lloyd Ferguson	262	2.9
Nha Le	251	2.8
Jim Rawling	87	1.0

==== Ward 19 Trinity—Spadina ====
Candidate	Votes	%
Joe Pantalone (incumbent)	8524	76.5
George Sawision	1710	15.3
Nick Boragina	511	4.6
Hïmy Syed	403	3.6

==== Ward 20 Trinity—Spadina ====
Candidate	Votes	%
Adam Vaughan	7834	51.7
Helen Kennedy	5334	35.2
Desmond Cole	750	4.9
Chris Ouellette	375	2.5
Joseph Tuan	359	2.4
Devendra Sharma	231	1.5
Douglas Lowry	193	1.3
Carmin Priolo	91	0.6

==== Ward 21 St. Paul's ====
Candidate	Votes	%
Joe Mihevc (incumbent)	8092	56.7
John Sewell	3326	23.3
John Adams	2712	19.0
Tony Corpuz	150	1.1

==== Ward 22 St. Paul's ====
Candidate	Votes	%
Michael Walker (incumbent)	11899	78.2
Rob Newman	2506	16.5
Gord Reynolds	805	5.3

==== Ward 23 Willowdale ====
Candidate	Votes	%
John Filion (incumbent)	8853	57.4
Andrew Miller	5235	34.0
Cornel Chifor	557	3.6
Mohammed Choudhary	394	2.6
Ignacio Manlangit	373	2.4

==== Ward 24 Willowdale ====
Candidate	Votes	%
David Shiner (incumbent)	6930	54.1
Ed Shiller	3768	29.4
Sanaz Amirpour	1329	10.4
Colleen Ladd	789	6.2

==== Ward 25 Don Valley West ====
Candidate	Votes	%
Cliff Jenkins (incumbent)	7954	58.3
Tony Dickins	2788	20.4
Robertson Boyle	971	7.1
Peter Kapsalis	967	7.1
John Blair	964	7.1

==== Ward 26 Don Valley West ====
Candidate	Votes	%
John Parker	3369	20.1
Mohamed Dhanani	3155	18.8
Abdul Ingar	2940	17.6
Geoff Kettel	1372	8.2
Natalie Maniates	1336	8.0
David Thomas	1095	6.5
John Masterson	887	5.3
Michele Carroll-Smith	743	4.4
Debbie Lechter	577	3.4
Csaba Vegh	371	2.2
Muhammad Alam	261	1.6
Fred Williams	256	1.5
Bahar Aminvaziri	215	1.3
Orhan Aybars	99	0.6
Raza Jabbar	76	0.5

==== Ward 27 Toronto Centre ====
Candidate	Votes	%
Kyle Rae (incumbent)	8931	56.5
Carol Golench	1391	8.8
Chris Reid	1330	8.4
Gary Leroux	1327	8.4
Cam Johnson	913	5.8
Susan Gapka	752	4.8
Daniel Young	614	3.9
Rob Bezanson	547	3.5

==== Ward 28 Toronto Centre ====
Candidate	Votes	%
Pam McConnell (incumbent)	8434	62.8
Howard Bortenstein	1418	10.6
Catherina Perez	1064	7.9
Yaqoob Khan	731	5.4
Connie Harrison	706	5.3
Holly Cartmell	646	4.8
Baquie Ghazi	440	3.3

==== Ward 29 Toronto—Danforth ====
Candidate	Votes	%
Case Ootes (incumbent)	5790	46.3
Diane Alexopoulos	5770	46.1
Andrew James	518	4.1
Hamish Wilson	183	1.5
John Richardson	137	1.1
Darryl Smith	114	0.9

==== Ward 30 Toronto—Danforth ====
Candidate	Votes	%
Paula Fletcher (incumbent)	7936	60.2
Suzanne McCormick	3470	26.3
Edward Chin	937	7.1
Michael Zubiak	522	4.0
Patrick Kraemer	220	1.7
Daniel Nicastro	96	0.7

==== Ward 31 Beaches—East York ====
Candidate	Votes	%
Janet Davis (incumbent)	8990	65.9
Steve Minos	4187	30.7
Paul Murton	176	1.3
Mark Hindle	167	1.2
Leonard Subotich	119	0.9

==== Ward 32 Beaches—East York ====
Candidate	Votes	%
Sandra Bussin (incumbent)	10377	69.8
Erica Maier	1287	8.7
John Lewis	1081	7.3
Donna Braniff	660	4.4
Matt Williams	557	3.7
Alan Burke	332	2.2
John Greer	305	2.1
William Gallos	196	1.3
Luca Mele	82	0.6

==== Ward 33 Don Valley East ====
Candidate	Votes	%
Shelley Carroll (incumbent)	6219	59.3
Sarah Tsang-Fahey	1424	13.6
Zane Caplan	1392	13.3
Jim Conlon	1060	10.1
Anderson Tung	398	3.4

==== Ward 34 Don Valley East ====
Candidate	Votes	%
Denzil Minnan-Wong (incumbent)	7567	60.7
Susan Salek	3240	26.0
George Maxwell	589	4.7
Atiya Ahmed	560	4.5
Gary Walsh	516	4.1

==== Ward 35 Scarborough Southwest ====
Candidate	Votes	%
Adrian Heaps	2949	23.8
Michelle Berardinetti	2860	23.1
Dan Harris	1853	14.9
Elizabeth Moyer	1371	11.1
Mike Kilpatrick	1098	8.9
Worrick Russell	786	6.3
Sharif Ahmed	669	5.4
Norman Lovatsis	436	3.5
Jason Carey	113	0.9
Armando Calderon	94	0.8
Michael Brausewetter	89	0.7
Tony Festino	52	0.4
Axcel Cocon	30	0.2

==== Ward 36 Scarborough Southwest ====
Candidate	Votes	%
Brian Ashton (incumbent)	9717	77.7
Eddy Gasparotto	1597	12.8
Greg Crompton	828	6.6
Ron Sonier	367	3.9

==== Ward 37 Scarborough Centre ====
Candidate	Votes	%
Michael Thompson (incumbent)	11987	87.1
Jamie Kallmeyer	1094	8.0
Derick Ackloo	674	4.9

==== Ward 38 Scarborough Centre ====
Candidate	Votes	%
Glenn De Baeremaeker (incumbent)	8583	61.9
Tushar Shah	1330	9.6
Willie Reodica	1233	8.9
Dan Sandor	1144	8.2
Bruce Hare	422	3.0
Kirk Jensen	399	2.9
Michael Binetti	390	2.8
Clement Babb	375	2.7

==== Ward 39 Scarborough—Agincourt ====
Candidate	Votes	%
Mike Del Grande (incumbent)	7964	68.2
John Wong	1888	16.2
Wayne Cook	660	5.6
Lushan Lu	614	5.3
Sunshine Smith	365	3.1
Samuel Kung	194	1.7

==== Ward 40 Scarborough—Agincourt ====
Candidate	Votes	%
Norm Kelly (incumbent)	10481	79.0
George Pappas	1618	12.2
Sunny Eren	746	5.6
Winston Ramjeet	416	3.1

==== Ward 41 Scarborough—Rouge River ====
Candidate	Votes	%
Chin Lee	5501	37.8
David Robertson	3324	22.9
Thadsha Navamanikkam	1727	11.9
Hratch Aynedjian	1376	9.5
Scott Shi	926	6.4
John Ching	690	4.7
Sonny Yeung	365	2.5
Malcolm Mansfield	338	2.3
Jose Baking	158	1.1
Min Lee	139	1.0

==== Ward 42 Scarborough—Rouge River ====
Candidate	Votes	%
Raymond Cho (incumbent)	7480	52.2
Kumar Nadarajah	3683	25.7
Mohammed Ather	1639	11.4
Bonnie Irwin	1532	10.7

==== Ward 43 Scarborough East ====
Candidate	Votes	%
Paul Ainslie	4677	38.7
Jim Robb	3388	28.1
Abdul Patel	1738	14.4
John Laforet	933	7.7
Mujeeb Khan	495	4.1
Glenn Kitchen	495	4.1
Amarjeet Chhabra	351	2.9

==== Ward 44 Scarborough East ====
Candidate	Votes	%
Ron Moeser	6480	41.3
Diana Hall	6419	40.9
Richard Ross	1062	6.8
Donald Blair	588	3.7
Kevin Richardson	587	3.7
Mohammed Mirza	421	2.7
Kevin Wellington	87	0.6
Richard Rieger	53	0.3
