= 1997 Toronto municipal election =

Amalgamated offices poll

1997 Toronto mayoral election
- November 10, 1997
- Turnout: 45.6%
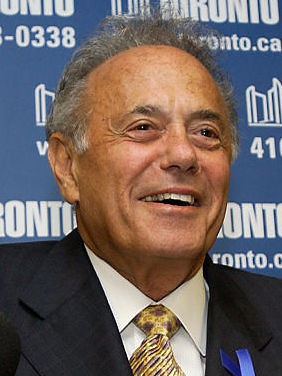

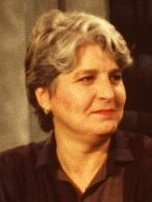
Candidate	Mel Lastman	Barbara Hall
Popular vote	387,848	346,452
Percentage	51.9%	46.4%
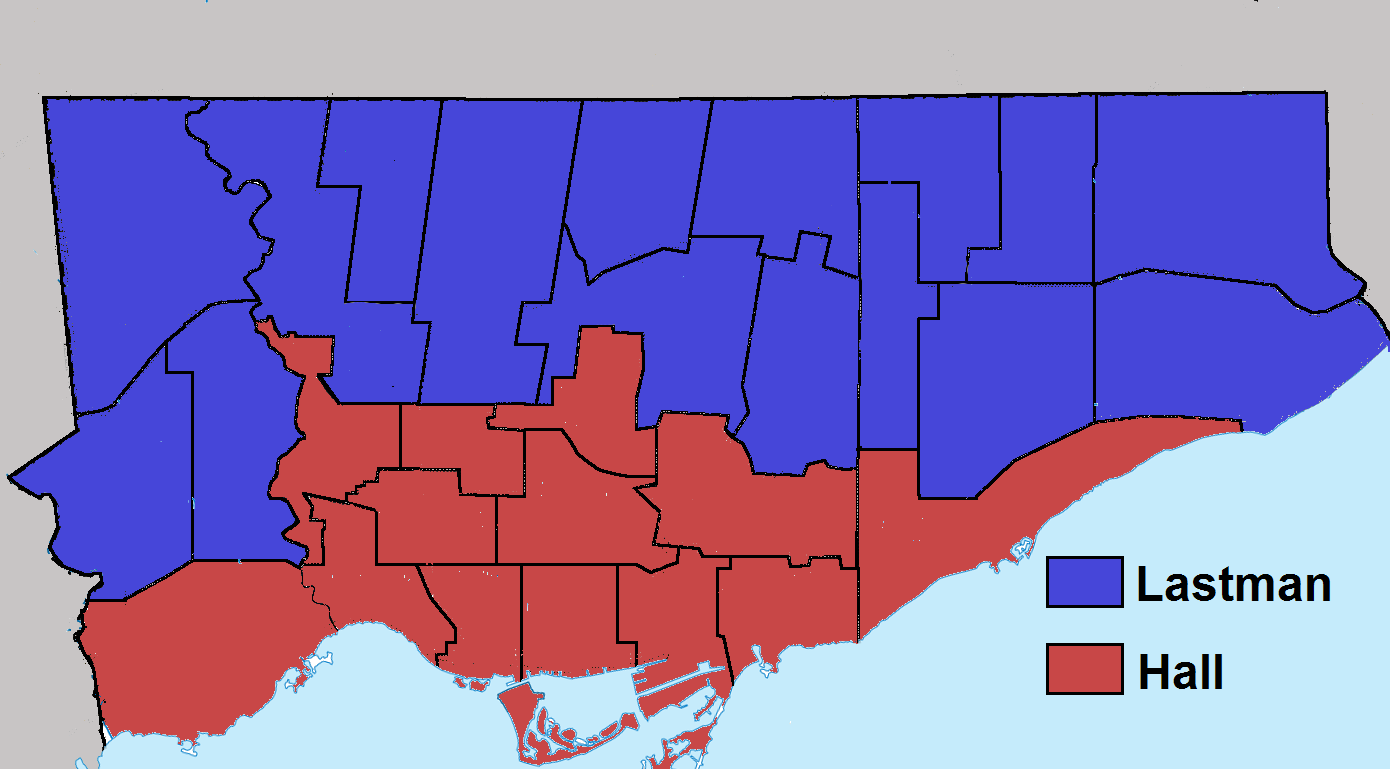
- Ward by ward results for mayor. Lastman won North York and the other suburbs while Hall won the southern and central areas.
Mayor of Toronto before election
Barbara Hall
(pre-amalgamation)
Elected Mayor of Toronto
Mel Lastman

The 1997 Toronto municipal election was the first election held for offices in the amalgamated "megacity" of Toronto, Ontario, Canada. The elections were administered by the old City of Toronto and its five suburbs within Metropolitan Toronto. The vote was held November 10, 1997, electing the mayor and 56 councillors in 28 wards who took office on January 1, 1998, the day of the amalgamation.

The election resulted in a showdown between two incumbent mayors of cities being dissolved into the megacity: Barbara Hall, the one-term mayor of the old city of Toronto, and Mel Lastman, who had been mayor of the suburban city North York for 25 years. Both candidates were independent, but Hall was a prior member of the left-of-centre New Democratic Party and Lastman of the right-of-centre Progressive Conservative Party of Ontario. Lastman was additionally well-known as pitchman for his family-owned Bad Boy furniture and appliance stores.

== Mayor ==
The mayoral race saw incumbents from the two largest former cities run to be mayor, the left-leaning Barbara Hall and the right-leaning Mel Lastman. Lastman won the election by a narrow margin, around 40,000 votes.

Election for Mayor, City of Toronto, 1926 of 1926 Polls Reporting
Candidate	Total votes	% of total votes
Mel Lastman	387,848	51.92%
Barbara Hall	346,452	46.38%
Don Andrews	1,985	0.26%
Ben Kerr	1,670	0.22%
William Burrill	1,421	0.19%
Steve Markle	1,244	0.16%
C. Edwards	1,214	0.12%
Munyonzwe Hamalengwa	1,124	0.15%
Hazel Jackson	1,062	0.14%
Alan Heisey, Sr.	994	0.13%
Hans Bathija	869	0.11%
Karl Hille	695	0.09%
Santa Cuda	647	0.08%
Laurence M. Honickman	610	0.08%
Joanne Pritchard	552	0.07%
George Dowar	462	0.06%
Jeffery Sharpe	379	0.05%
Ernest Michaud	281	0.03%
Michael Houlton-Charette	211	0.02%
Duri Naimji	177	0.02%
Totals	746,897	100%

== Council ==
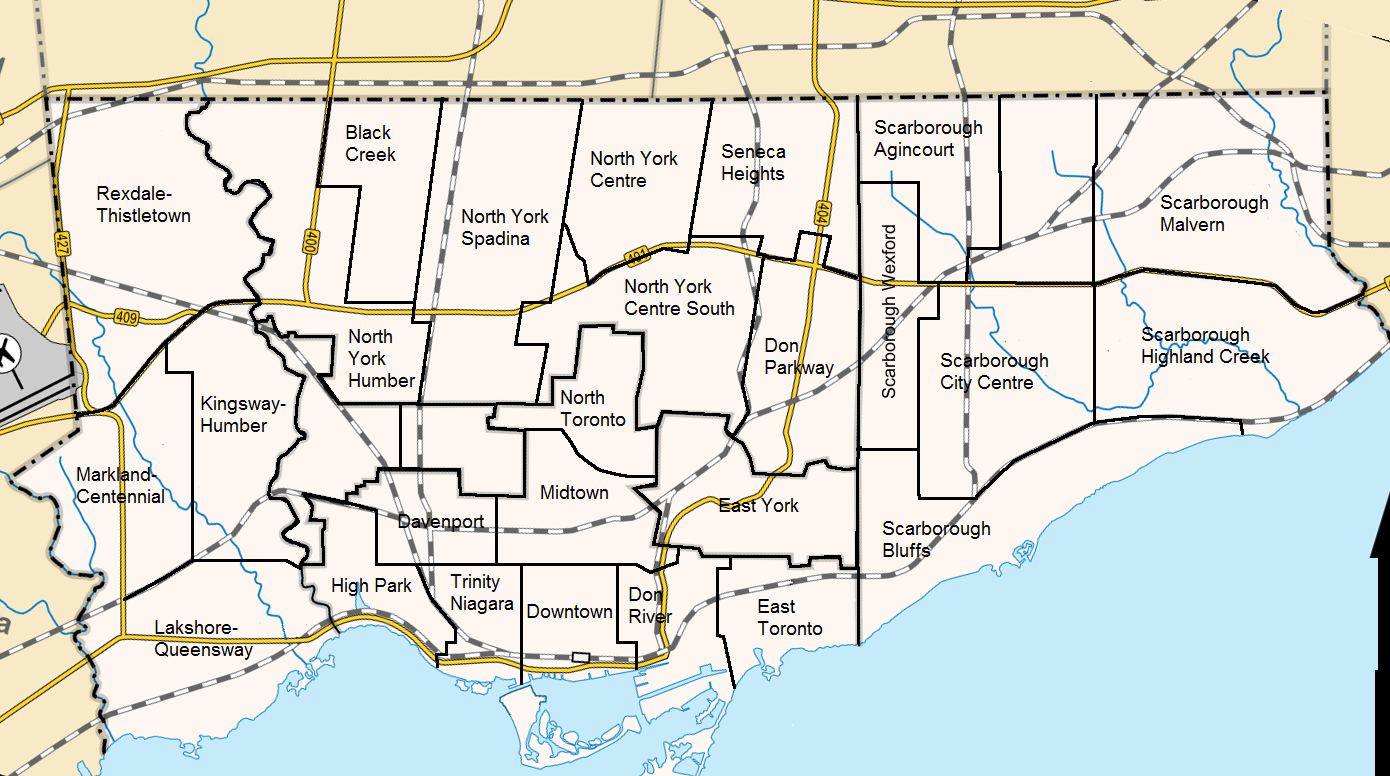
The ward map used in the 1997 election. Previously the map of Metro divisions, but with two candidates now elected per ward

The election followed a plurality-at-large voting system where electors could vote for two candidates. Each of the 28 wards elected two councillors.

Ward 1 – East York
Michael Prue – 22440
Case Ootes – 8608
Jane Pitfield – 6926
Michael Tziretas – 6349
Elizabeth Rowley – 5707
Bob Dale – 4709
George Vasilopoulos – 4275
Paul Fernandes – 3156
Paul Robinson – 2885
Hortencia Fotopoulos – 663
Edward Wigglesworth – 368

Ward 2 – Lakeshore Queensway
Irene Jones – 9387
Blake Kinahan – 7788
Peter Milczyn – 7127
Jeff Knoll – 6877
Connie Micallef – 5179
Diethar Lein – 4396
David Smith – 2286
Joe Connell – 713
George Kash – 409

Ward 3 – Kingsway Humber
Gloria Lindsay Luby – 13123
Mario Giansante – 12767
Dennis Flynn – 10092
Rob Ford – 9366
Adam Slobodian – 797
Ben Cachola – 753

Ward 4 – Markland Centennial
Doug Holyday – 15430
Dick O'Brien – 10410
Agnes Ugolini Potts – 9650
Brian Flynn – 6809
Steve Deighton – 3974
Helen Bodanis – 799
Mark Stanisz – 507
Daphne Gabriel – 413
Alexander P. Masur – 279

Ward 5 – Rexdale Thistletown
Elizabeth Brown – 6546
Bruce Sinclair – 6482
Vincent Crisanti – 3540
John Kiru – 3203
Marco Luciani – 2847
Carmela Sasso – 2244
Brian Ineson – 2135
Nicolo Fortunato – 1925
Peter Kell – 1240
Anthony Caputo – 1133
Patrick McCool – 1045
Rosemarie Mulhall – 413

Ward 6 – North York Humber
Judy Sgro – 14334
George Mammoliti – 10226
Gina Serverino – 6875
Tony Marzilli – 5205
Bob Churchhill – 5012
Michael Marson – 722

Ward 7 – Black Creek

1997 Toronto municipal election: Councillor, Ward Seven (two members elected)
Candidate	Votes	%
Maria Augimeri	11,243	28.01
Peter Li Preti	9,747	24.28
Maria Rizzo	8,850	22.05
Anthony Perruzza	6,347	15.81
Anna Stella	2,961	7.38
Jeanelle Julien	523	1.30
Abdulhaq Omar	467	1.16
Total valid votes	40,138	100.00

- Anna Stella is a longtime community activist in the Black Creek area of Toronto. She applied to replace Anthony Perruzza as North York's fifth ward councillor in 1990, after Perruzza was elected to the provincial legislature and council decided to nominate an interim replacement rather than hold a by-election. She was turned down in favour of Claudio Polsinelli. Stella was later elected to the Metro Toronto Separate School Board in the 1994 municipal election, easily defeating four other candidates in Ward Twelve. She supported greater parental involvement in school affairs and a zero-tolerance policy toward violence, although she opposed Scarborough's policy of expulsion. In the 1997 election, she was endorsed by Art Eggleton and Annamarie Castrilli.
- Jeanelle Julien was a first-time candidate.

Ward 8 – North York Spadina

1997 Toronto municipal election: Councillor, Ward Eight (two members elected)
Candidate	Votes	%
(x)Howard Moscoe	16,187	35.74
(x)Mike Feldman	14,737	32.54
Frank Di Giorgio	11,487	25.36
Henry Braverman	1,572	3.47
Nickeisha Hudson	923	2.04
Roy Dzeko	383	0.85
Total valid votes	45,289	100.00

- Henry Braverman was a first-time candidate.
- Nickeisha Hudson was a student trustee in 1997, and was awarded a Harry Jerome Award for leadership. She was a first-time candidate. In 1999, she was a youth events coordinator in Hamilton.
- Dzeko is a businessman in Toronto. He was a first-time candidate.

Ward 9 – North York Centre South
Joanne Flint – 16447
Milton Berger – 12370
Dick Chapman – 8484
Stuart Ian Weinstein – 3740

Ward 10 – North York Centre
John Filion – 17533
Norman Gardner – 15135
Ron Summers – 11212

Ward 11 – Don Parkway
Gordon Chong – 11961
Denzil Minnan-Wong – 11001
Don Yuill – 10450
Kim Scott – 4742
Allen Scott – 4369
Janaki Bala-Krishan – 2901
Neil Milson – 684
Christopher M. Beale – 653
Dixon Rhamadeen – 380

Ward 12 – Seneca Heights
Joan King – 18471
David Shiner – 18319
Raffi Assadourian – 5151
Joel Ginsberg – 3345
Bernadette Michael – 2938

Ward 13 – Scarborough Bluffs
Brian Ashton – 15528
Gerry Altobello – 12605
Fred Johnston – 11265
Gaye Dale – 6491
Karin Eaton – 4670
Ed Green – 931

Ward 14 – Scarborough Wexford
Norm Kelly – 13740
Mike Tzekas – 12318
Aris Babikian – 3644
Gerry Leonard – 2366
George Pornaras – 2024

Ward 15 – Scarborough City Centre
Brad Duguid – 15686
Lorenzo Berardinetti – 14179
Paul Mushinski – 9141
Betty Hackett – 4579
Russell Worrick – 3882
Ron Hartung – 743

Ward 16 – Scarborough Highland Creek
Frank Faubert – 15062
Ron Moeser – 13955
David Soknacki – 12183
Chris Braney – 7142

Ward 17 – Scarborough Agincourt
Sherene Shaw – 10634
Doug Mahood – 9861
Wayne Cook – 5631
Jeff Mark – 4909
Doug Hum – 4645

Ward 18 – Scarborough Malvern
Raymond Cho – 11190
Bas Balkissoon – 10745
Edith Montgomery – 10659
Jim Mackey – 2621
Terry Singh – 1812
Sinna Chelliah – 1165
Jasmine Singh – 871
Arlanna Lewis – 666
George B. Singh – 339

Ward 19 – High Park

1997 Toronto municipal election: Councillor, Ward Nineteen (two members elected)
Candidate	Votes	%
(x)David Miller	13,665	27.64
(x)Chris Korwin-Kuczynski	13,115	26.53
Connie Dejak	8,267	16.72
(x)David Hutcheon	7,437	15.04
Alex Chumak	3,931	7.95
Ed Hooven	1,336	2.70
Walter Melnyk	1,085	2.19
Jorge Van Schouwen	599	1.21
Total valid votes	49,435	100.00

- Connie Dejak is a longtime administrator at Runnymede Chronic Care Hospital. As of 2006, she is the hospital's president and chief executive officer. When a reviewing committee appointed by the Mike Harris provincial government decided to close Runnymede in 1997, she organized the hospital's successful challenge against the decision. Dejak is also a community activist, and has served on a police liaison committee for her neighbourhood. She and David Miller were endorsed by the Toronto Star newspaper in the 1997 campaign. She later sought an appointment to the Toronto Police Serves Board in 1999, but was passed over in favour of Alan Heisey. In the 2003 mayoral contest, she supported John Nunziata. Dejak is a member of the Liberal Party, and there are reports that she considered running for the party in a 2006 provincial by-election in Parkdale—High Park.
- Ed Hooven has a PhD in Sociology, and is currently an assistant professor at York University. His formal biographical sketch indicates that his past works have focused on European integration, the post-war Japanese economy and North American free trade agreements. His current work focused on the Canadian Charter of Rights and Freedoms and "judicial activism". He has contributed a chapter to "Canada and the New Economic Order", entitled "The New World Order: In a New Millennium". Hooven has called for governments to distinguish between the "deserving" and "undeserving" when determining policies on social assistance. He has written against multiculturalism and the Canadian Charter of Rights and Freedoms as leading to "creeping moral relativism", and has also criticized the powers of the Canadian judiciary. He has accused feminists of seeking to destroy the nuclear family. Hooven has been active with the Progressive Conservative Party of Ontario, and was research director for the Republican candidate for governor in the 1998 New Hampshire state elections. He is a member of Republicans Abroad Canada. He also plays guitar in the Mississauga Big Band Ensemble.
- Walter Melnyk was a teacher in Peel, and later worked in sales. He was a member of the Metro Toronto Separate School Board from 1980 to 1988. He was first elected in the 1980 municipal election, defeating incumbent trustee Edward Boehler in the city's first ward. During this campaign, he called for better services for graduating elementary students entering the public school system. In 1984, he brought forward a motion to provide medical services for students afflicted by poor environmental conditions in Toronto's Junction Triangle. Melnyk also promoted mandatory physical education programs. In January 1988, he brought forward a motion criticizing existing practices on the Separate School Board, suggesting that the board consider breaking itself up into regional bodies. He argued that the board was dominated by a secretive "old guard", who often reduced other trustees to the role of passive spectators. The board rejected his motion. Melnyk also called for non-Catholics to be allowed into Catholic schools. He was defeated by Barbara Poplowski in the 1988 municipal election; a newspaper article from the campaign lists him as thirty-nine years old. After the election, he was appointed as a school representative on the Toronto Board of Health. He campaigned for a seat on the Toronto City Council in 1991, promising to introduce a taxpayers' bill of rights. He narrowly lost to New Democratic Party incumbent Rob Maxwell in the eleventh ward. Melnyk was later banned from running in the 1994 municipal election, after failing to file a financial statement for his 1991 campaign. He worked as the campaign manager for city council candidate Alex Chumak, but was forced to leave this campaign amid controversy. Chumak informed the media that Melnyk had offered a rival candidate a position on the Toronto Board of Health in return for leaving the race; Melnyk said that he did nothing wrong. Melnyk ran for a position on the new city council in 1997, and was defeated. He tried to return to the Separate School Board (now renamed as the Toronto Catholic District School Board) in 2000, but lost to Barbara Poplowski for a second time.

Ward 20 – Trinity Niagara
Joe Pantalone – 11031
Mario Silva – 10252
Martin Silva – 8329
Joe Magalhaes – 4035

Ward 21 – Davenport
Betty Disero – 10747
Dennis Fotinos – 7587
Rob Maxwell – 6858
John Doherty – 5096
Tony Letra – 4788
Dale Ritch – 1111
Jennifer Bauer – 1049

Ward 22 – North Toronto
Anne Johnston – 17123
Michael Walker – 16449
Kay Gardner – 15275
Linda Sparling – 8235
David N. Coleman – 1525
John Ringer – 665

Ward 23 – Midtown
John Adams – 12010
Ila Bossons – 11553
Howard Joy – 10651
Brian Mayes – 8659
Howard Levine – 6167
David Vallance – 2112
Blair Gray – 622
Philip Charles – 427

Ward 24 – Downtown
Olivia Chow – 20453
Kyle Rae – 16149
Al Carbone – 5186
Paul Hogan – 2319
Rosie Schwartz – 2001
Doug Lowry – 1615
Charlene Cottle – 864
Roberto Verdecchia – 787
Carmin Priolo – 398

Ward 25 – Don River
Jack Layton – 15045
Pam McConnell – 8359
Peter Tabuns – 8141
Soo Wong – 7212
Spiros Papathanasakis – 6590
Terry Brackett – 1546
Mike Armstrong – 1429
Wendy Forrest – 947
Larry Tabin – 939

Ward 26 – East Toronto
Tom Jakobek – 14945
Sandra Bussin – 13323
Paul Christie – 12883
Steve Ellis – 11649
Bruce Bryce – 643

Ward 27 – York Humber
Frances Nunziata – 14354
Bill Saundercook – 6295
Michael McDonald – 5245
Randy Leach – 4837
Carl Miller – 4684
Stan Kumorek – 1535
Natalie Wall – 661
Arthur Saverino – 540
Paul Jewett – 268

Ward 28 – York Eglinton
Joe Mihevc – 7548
Rob Davis – 6660
Caroline DiGiovanni – 5989
Tony Rizzo – 5538
Joan Roberts – 4077
Chai Kalevar – 912
