= 2000 Toronto municipal election =

2000 Toronto mayoral election
- November 13, 2000
- Turnout: 36.1% (▼9.5 pp)
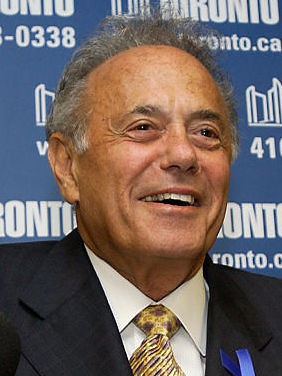
		TG
Candidate	Mel Lastman	Tooker Gomberg
Popular vote	483,277	51,111
Percentage	80.0%	8.5%
Mayor of Toronto before election
Mel Lastman
Elected Mayor of Toronto
Mel Lastman

The 2000 Toronto municipal election was the municipal and school board election of 2000 held in Toronto on November 13, 2000.

Law and order was a prominent theme during campaigning, as several candidates with past convictions ran for regional council seats.

Elections were held to elect:

- the Mayor of Toronto,
- councillors for each of Toronto's 44 wards,
- trustees for each of the Toronto District School Board's 22 sections (each comprising two city wards),
- trustees for each of the Toronto Catholic District School Board's 12 sections (each comprising two to six city wards),
- trustees for the three sections of the Conseil scolaire de district du Centre-Sud-Ouest (French-language public school board) located in Toronto, and
- trustees for the two sections of the Conseil scolaire de district catholique Centre-Sud (French-language Catholic school board) located in Toronto.

== Mayoralty election ==
=== Results ===
Mayor, City of Toronto
1,992 of 1,992 polls reporting
Name	Votes	Percent
Mel Lastman	483,277	79.96%
Tooker Gomberg	51,111	8.46%
Enza Anderson	13,595	2.25%
Douglas Campbell	8,591	1.42%
Steven Lam	6,853	1.13%
Hazel Jackson	5,310	0.87%
Kevin Clarke	4,147	0.68%
Daniel Carras	3,534	0.58%
Ben Kerr	3,115	0.52%
Marcos Solorzano	2,419	0.40%
Tim Duncan	2,253	0.37%
Diana-De Maxted	2,128	0.36%
Brian Fisher	1,817	0.30%
David Predovich	1,687	0.28%
Duri Naimji	1,640	0.27%
Victor Fraser	1,638	0.27%
Frenchie McFarlane	1,635	0.27%
George Dowar	1,430	0.24%
John Steele	1,412	0.23%
Dave Du Moulin	1,204	0.19%
Josef Klinghoffer	1,131	0.18%
King Siu	1,104	0.18%
Kevin Richardson	1,065	0.17%
Abel Van Wyk	1,005	0.16%
Kevin Knopman	670	0.11%
Thomas Shipley	623	0.10%
Totals	604,394	100%

== City council ==
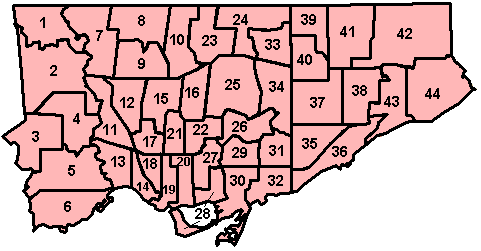
The 2000 ward map

The city council elections were eventful. Redistricting increased the number of wards from 28 to 44. Each new ward only elected a single councillor, instead of the previous two per ward. The number of councillors was reduced from 56 to 44. This created several battles between incumbents such as Gloria Lindsay Luby against Mario Giansante, David Miller versus Bill Saundercook, and Milton Berger against Anne Johnston. For the most part, incumbents were re-elected: the major exception was Etobicoke where three incumbents -- Blake Kinahan, Elizabeth Brown, and Bruce Sinclair —were defeated. Over all, the elections shifted the council somewhat to the left.

Ward 1 - Etobicoke North:

- Suzan Hall 2,894
- Vincent Crisanti 2,797
- Manjinder Singh 2,471
- (incumbent) Bruce Sinclair 1,907
- Anthony Caputo 978
- Murphy Browne 364
- Courtney Doldron 134
- Alan Nemaric 64
- Albin Janus 59

Ward 2 - Etobicoke North:

- Rob Ford 5,750
- (incumbent) Elizabeth Brown 4,122
- Nicolò Fortunato 1,747
- Mahdi Abdurahman 766
- Joseph Martino 598
- Arnold Minors 295

Ward 3 - Etobicoke Centre:

- (incumbent) Doug Holyday 12,639
- Nicholas Florio 2,491

Ward 4 - Etobicoke Centre:

- (incumbent) Gloria Lindsay Luby 9,295
- (incumbent) Mario Giansante 8,138
- John Sumka 481

Ward 5 - Etobicoke—Lakeshore:

- Peter Milczyn 6,970
- (incumbent) Blake Kinahan 6,640
- Brian Flynn 3,193

Ward 6 - Etobicoke—Lakeshore:

- (incumbent) Irene Jones 10,442
- David Rifat 1,617
- George Kash 1,373

Ward 7 - York West:

- (incumbent) George Mammoliti 9,123
- Satpal Banga 3,189

2000 Toronto municipal election: Councillor, Ward Eight
Candidate	Votes	%
(x)Peter Li Preti	5,363	56.49
Anthony Perruzza	4,131	43.51
Total valid votes	9,494	100.00

Ward 9 - York Centre:

- (incumbent) Maria Augimeri 8,698
- Mary Cicogna 2,816
- Frank Aceto 504

2000 Toronto municipal election: Councillor, Ward Ten
Candidate	Votes	%
Mike Feldman (incumbent)	12,221	81.98
Lorne Berg	2,687	18.02
Total valid votes	14,908	100.00

Ward 11 - York South—Weston:

- (incumbent) Frances Nunziata 10,493
- Mike Washuck 1,828

Ward 12 - York South—Weston:

- Frank Di Giorgio 4,061
- Lorenzo Zeppieri 2,719
- Mario Gentile 2,567
- Sal Piccininni 1,835
- Paul Taylor 1,035

2000 Toronto municipal election: Councillor, Ward Thirteen
Candidate	Votes	%
(x)David Miller	11,274	61.71
(x)Bill Saundercook	6,995	38.29
Total valid votes	18,269	100.00

Ward 14 - Parkdale-High Park:

- (incumbent) Chris Korwin-Kuczynski 7,488
- John Colautti 4,012
- Victor Watson 724
- Jorge Van Schouwen 416

2000 Toronto municipal election: Councillor, Ward Fifteen
Candidate	Votes	%
(x)Howard Moscoe	8,611	57.70
Tony Rizzo	4,984	33.40
Jim McMillan	924	6.19
Jason Baker	405	2.71
Total valid votes	14,924	100.00

Ward 16 - Eglinton—Lawrence:

- (incumbent) Anne Johnston 8,012
- (incumbent) Milton Berger 4,148
- Albert Pantaleo 2,101
- David Lipton 572

Ward 17 - Davenport:

- (incumbent) Betty Disero 8,711
- Romolo Cimaroli 1,743

Ward 18 - Davenport:

- (incumbent) Mario Silva 6,037
- Adam Giambrone 3,338
- Janice Cudlip 319
- Richard Kankis 206

Ward 19 - Trinity—Spadina:

- (incumbent) Joe Pantalone 9,971
- Philip Vettese 1,098

Ward 20 - Trinity—Spadina:

- (incumbent) Olivia Chow 9,477
- Rosie Schwartz 1,140
- Roberto Verdecchia 1,126

Ward 21 - St. Paul's:

- (incumbent) Joe Mihevc 9,636
- (incumbent) Rob Davis 5,989
- Chai Kalevar 311

Ward 22 - St. Paul's:

- (incumbent) Michael Walker 11,542
- Jim Walker 4,822

Ward 23 - Willowdale:

- (incumbent) John Filion 10,213
- Ron Summers 5,395
- Youval Zilberberg 813

Ward 24 - Willowdale:

- (incumbent) David Shiner 11,673
- Bernadette Michael 2,481

Ward 25 - Don Valley West:

- (incumbent) Joanne Flint 11,124
- John Cameron 2,891

Ward 26 - Don Valley West:

- (incumbent) Jane Pitfield 11,058
- Don Yuill 3,421
- Muhammad Bajwa 1,162

Ward 27 - Toronto Centre—Rosedale:

- (incumbent) Kyle Rae acclaimed

Ward 28 - Toronto Centre—Rosedale:

- (incumbent) Pam McConnell 7,573
- Jennifer Daly 1,630
- Wendy Forrest 1,038
- Mike Armstrong 1,027
- Nichola Marshall 748
- James Sturdy 415
- Aaron Hume 363

Ward 29 - Broadview—Greenwood:

- Case Ootes 7,660
- Gail Nyberg 4,391
- Bob Dale 1,963
- Nick Radia 276

Ward 30 - Broadview—Greenwood:

- (incumbent) Jack Layton 8,671
- Linda Lynch 3,750
- Ty Daniels 817
- Jeff Layton 627
- Ghuffar Rabbani 523
- Joseph Norte 126

Ward 31 - Beaches—East York:

- (incumbent) Michael Prue 10,435
- Paul Fernandes 3,183
- John Simmons 555

Ward 32 - Beaches—East York:

- (incumbent) Sandra Bussin 10,766
- David Moll 5,530
- Paul Azzarello 419
- Bruce Bryer 388
- Jeffery Dorman 309

Ward 33 - Don Valley East:

- Paul Sutherland 9,860
- Daniel Georgescu 1,004
- Thomas Lynch 996
- Robert Ladanyi 458

Ward 34 - Don Valley East:

- Denzil Minnan-Wong 8,730
- Kim Scott 5,078
- Neil Milson 599

Ward 35 - Scarborough Southwest:

- (incumbent) Gerry Altobello 7,118
- Worrick Russell 3,290
- Tao Gold 566

Ward 36 - Scarborough Southwest:

- (incumbent) Brian Ashton 9,374
- Robert Scott 3,682

Ward 37 - Scarborough Centre:

- (incumbent) Lorenzo Berardinetti 11,007
- Colleen Mills 3,203

Ward 38 - Scarborough Centre:

- Brad Duguid 11,369
- Angela Bischoff 1,693

Ward 39 - Scarborough—Agincourt:

- (incumbent) Sherene Shaw 8,474
- Simon Kwan 1,531
- Sunshine Smith 1,069

Ward 40 - Scarborough—Agincourt:

- (incumbent) Norm Kelly 8,115
- (incumbent) Mike Tzekas 4,322
- Manna Wong 2,108
- Winston Ramjeet 323

Ward 41 - Scarborough—Rouge River:

- (incumbent) Bas Balkissoon 9,141
- Mike Thomas 4,714

Ward 42 - Scarborough—Rouge River:

- (incumbent) Raymond Cho 7,428
- Eden Gajraj 2,101
- Horace Dockery 1,890
- Pat Johnson 562

Ward 43 - Scarborough East:

- (incumbent) David Soknacki acclaimed

Ward 44 - Scarborough East:

- (incumbent) Ron Moeser 9,897
- Sheila White 3,568
- Jeff Phillips 1,530
