= Michelle Holland =

Canadian politician (born 1973)

Toronto City Councillor for (Ward 35) Scarborough Southwest
- In office December 1, 2010 – December 1, 2018
- Preceded by: Adrian Heaps
- Succeeded by: Gary Crawford (Ward 20)

Personal details
- Born: 1973 (age 52–53) Chatham, Ontario, Canada
- Spouse: Lorenzo Berardinetti (m. 2004; div. 2018)
- Occupation: Consultant
- Website: www.councillorholland.ca

Michelle Holland (born 1973) is a Canadian politician. She was elected to Toronto City Council in the 2010 city council election, defeating Adrian Heaps in Ward 35.

== Background ==
Holland was born and raised in Chatham, Ontario. She started working as a student in the offices of Deputy Prime Minister Herb Gray in Windsor during her undergraduate degree in 1995. She also worked for MPPs Sandra Pupatello and Dave Levac. She spent some time working as a consultant before entering politics herself. She then moved to Toronto to pursue her studies in International Relations at the University of Toronto.

She married Lorenzo Berardinetti on October 7, 2004. He served as Liberal Member of Provincial Parliament for Scarborough Southwest from 2003 to 2018 and had previously been a city councillor (Ward 37). Known by the surname Berardinetti for a brief period of her political career, she reverted to using her maiden surname in 2014 after their legal separation. They finalized their divorce in 2018.

== Politics ==
In 2006, she ran for city councillor in the riding of Scarborough Southwest. She ran on a campaign of making sure that Scarborough got its "fair share" of tax dollars. She said, "A lot of our property tax dollars are being spent downtown and not here." She declared, "a road downtown will get paved two or three times before one is paved out here." City officials pointed out that this was not true, that road maintenance was based on need not location. In 2005, Scarborough accounted for 24% of the road repair budget which was commensurate with its population. She narrowly lost by 89 votes.

On November 11, 2006, two days before the election The Globe and Mail published an article by columnist John Barber that endorsed Heaps while belittling Holland. Barber characterized her as the "wife of local MPP Lorenzo Berardinetti and so-called 'political adviser' (read: pillow talker). Scarborough deserves better than nepotism." Holland complained to the Ontario Press Council, saying the article made "serious, damaging" statements about her. The press council agreed that the article was unfair. In December The Globe and Mail published a correction stating that Holland was "unfairly demeaned" and that she in fact had more than 10 years experience working in government.

In early 2007, she sued Heaps for defamation. She claimed that he defamed her by reprinting the article claiming that he was the favourite and that Holland was not qualified for the job. Heaps and Holland eventually settled out of court with Heaps issuing an apology and paying for legal expenses.

In the 2010 election, Holland ran again for the ward against Heaps. One of the major issues was bike lanes in the ward. Holland claimed that unconnected bike lanes on Pharmacy Avenue and Birchmount Road were leading some residents who lived on those streets to move out of the ward. Holland, who described them as "bike lanes to nowhere", said that she would replace them with sharrows. This time she won the election by 2,203 votes.

Holland lost to fellow incumbent Gary Crawford in Ward 20 during the 2018 Toronto municipal election.

== Election results ==
2018 Toronto election, Ward 20 Scarborough Southwest
Candidate	Votes	Percentage
(incumbent)Gary Crawford	10,505	35.73%
(incumbent)Michelle Holland-Berardinetti	10,094	34.33%
Mohsin Bhuiyan	2,910	9.9%
Paulina Corpuz	1,813	6.17%
Suman Roy	1,582	5.38%
Gerard Arbour	1,187	4.04%
Curtis Smith	541	1.84%
Robert McDermott	367	1.25%
Bruce Waters	246	0.84%
John Letonja	160	0.54%

2014 Toronto election, Ward 35
Candidate Name	Number of votes	% of votes
Michelle Berardinetti	11,919	63.25
Paul Bocking	2,722	14.44
Sharif Ahmed	927	4.92
Christopher Upwood	890	4.72
Shahid Uddin	831	4.41
Teferi Assefa	487	2.58
Anwarul Kabir	403	2.14
Saima Shaikh	389	2.06
Jason Woychesko	277	1.47
Total	18,845	100

2010 Toronto election, Ward 35
Candidate	Votes	%
Michelle Berardinetti	8,293	50.4
Adrian Heaps	6,020	36.6
Malik Ahmad	850	5.2
Victoria Doyle	429	2.6
Ed Green	253	1.6
John Lewis	183	1.1
Jay Burnett	173	1.1
Peter Tijiri	90	0.6
John Morawietz	76	0.5
Jason Woychesko	70	0.4
Total	16,437	100%

2006 Toronto election, Ward 35
Candidate	Votes	%
Adrian Heaps	2,949	23.8
Michelle Berardinetti	2,860	23.1
Dan Harris	1,853	14.9
Elizabeth Moyer	1,371	11.1
Mike Kilpatrick	1,098	8.9
Worrick Russell	786	6.3
Sharif Ahmed	669	5.4
Norman Lovatsis	436	3.5
Jason Carey	113	0.9
Armando Calderon	94	0.8
Michael Brausewetter	89	0.7
Tony Festino	52	0.4
Axcel Cocon	30	0.2
Total	12,400	100%
