= Scarborough Southwest =

Scarborough Southwest may refer to:

- Scarborough Southwest (federal electoral district), federal riding in Toronto, Ontario, Canada
- Scarborough Southwest (provincial electoral district), provincial riding in Toronto, Ontario, Canada
- Ward 20 Scarborough Southwest, municipal ward in Toronto, Ontario, Canada
