= Scarborough Junction =

- Neighbourhood
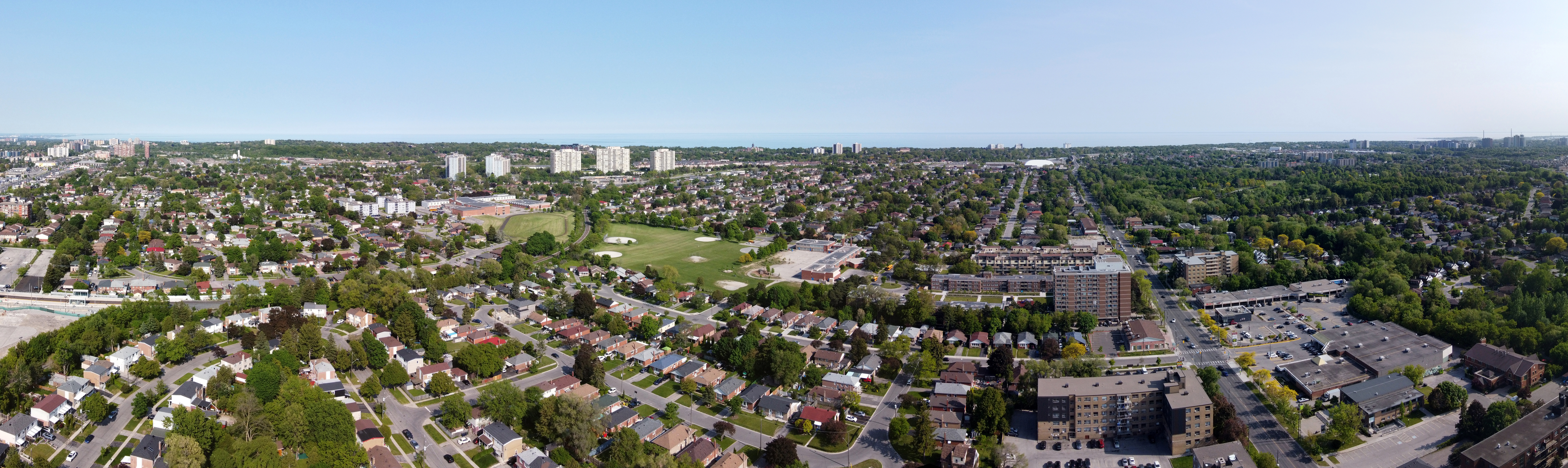
- Aerial view of Scarborough Junction in 2023

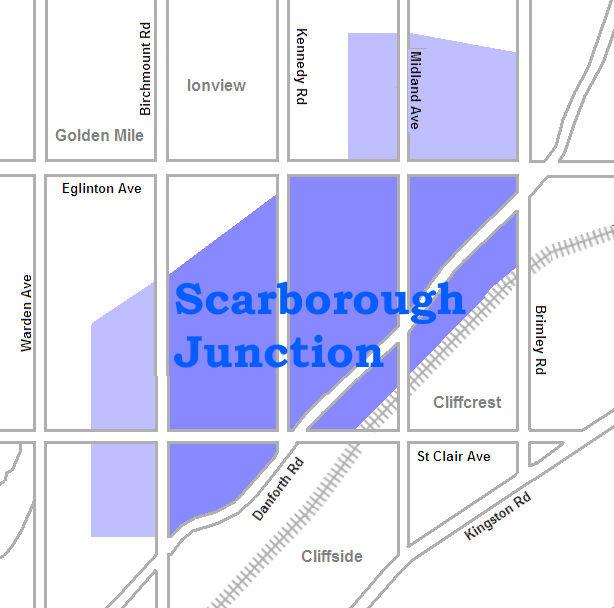
- Coordinates: 43°43′00″N 79°15′35″W
- Country: Canada
- Province: Ontario
- City: Toronto
- Established: 1850 Scarborough Township
- Changed municipality: 1998 Toronto from City of Scarborough

Government
  - MP: Bill Blair (Scarborough Southwest)
  - MPP: Doly Begum (Scarborough Southwest)
  - Councillor: Parthi Kandavel (Ward 20 Scarborough Southwest)
- Postal codes: M1K
- Area code: 416, 647 and 437

Scarborough Junction (also known as Kennedy Park) is a small neighbourhood in the Scarborough district of Toronto, Ontario, Canada. It is bordered by Birchmount Road, Brimley Road, Eglinton Avenue, and St. Clair Avenue. Scarbrough Junction has an approximated population of 20,000. The population consists of 1/4 Caucasian, 2/4 Asian (South and East) and 1/4 other (Black, Latino, etc.)

Scarborough Junction is represented by Ward 20 Scarborough Southwest along with the federal and provincial ridings of Scarborough Southwest and the postal code is M1K. It is patrolled by the 41 Division of the Toronto Police Service.

== History ==
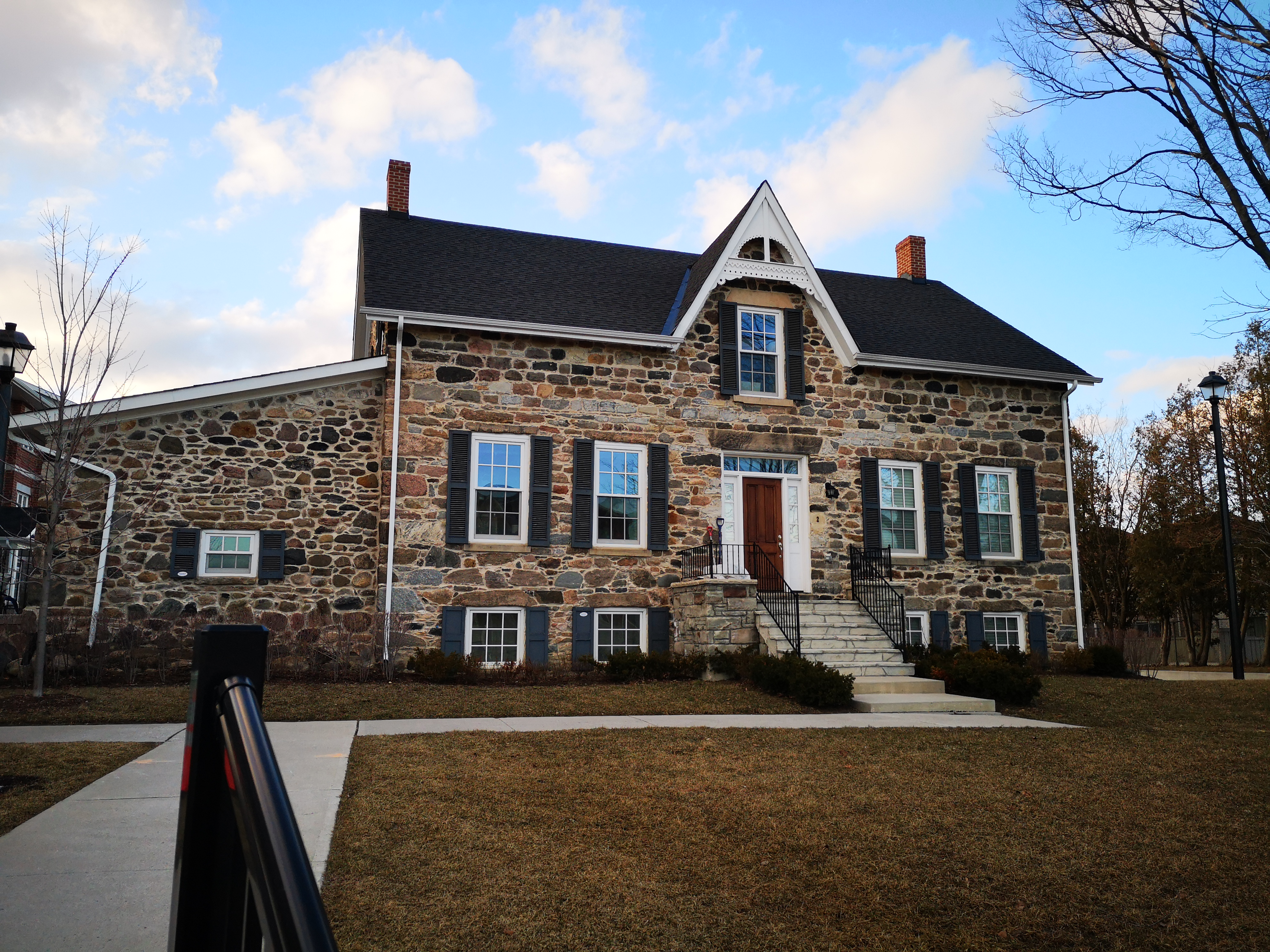
Built in 1840, Thornbeck-Bell House is an example of an early residence in Scarborough Junction.

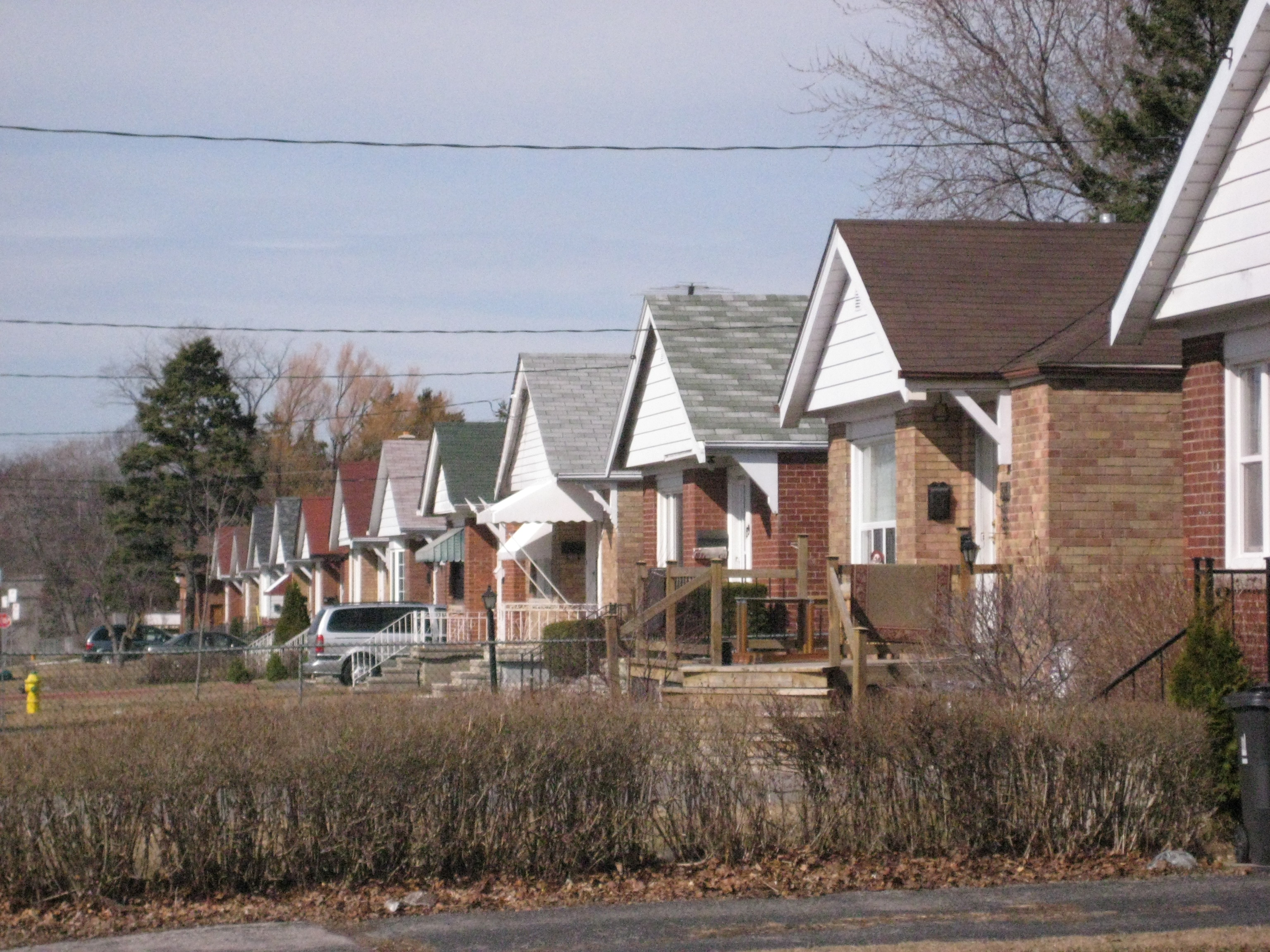
Houses in Scarborough Junction

The first European settlement in the area was the hamlet of Strangford established at what is today the intersection of Victoria Park and St. Clair in 1863. Another hamlet named Mortlake was established in 1865. The community's main building, the Halfway House Hotel, survives today at Black Creek Pioneer Village where it was moved in 1962. The small farming communities changed when the area became the meeting point of two major railways. The Grand Trunk Railway laid track through the area in 1856 and the Toronto and Nipissing Railway arrived in 1873. The business of the area changed from farming to supporting travellers and maintaining the railroads. By 1896 Scarborough Junction became the most populated area of the Township of Scarborough.

The post-World War II years saw Scarborough Junction become one of the first areas of Scarborough to be transformed into modern suburbs. Its major road and rail lines made for easy travel to the city, inspiring the epithet "Scarborough Junction." It is actually named for the junction of two early railways: The Grand Trunk and the Toronto-Nipissing.

== Education ==
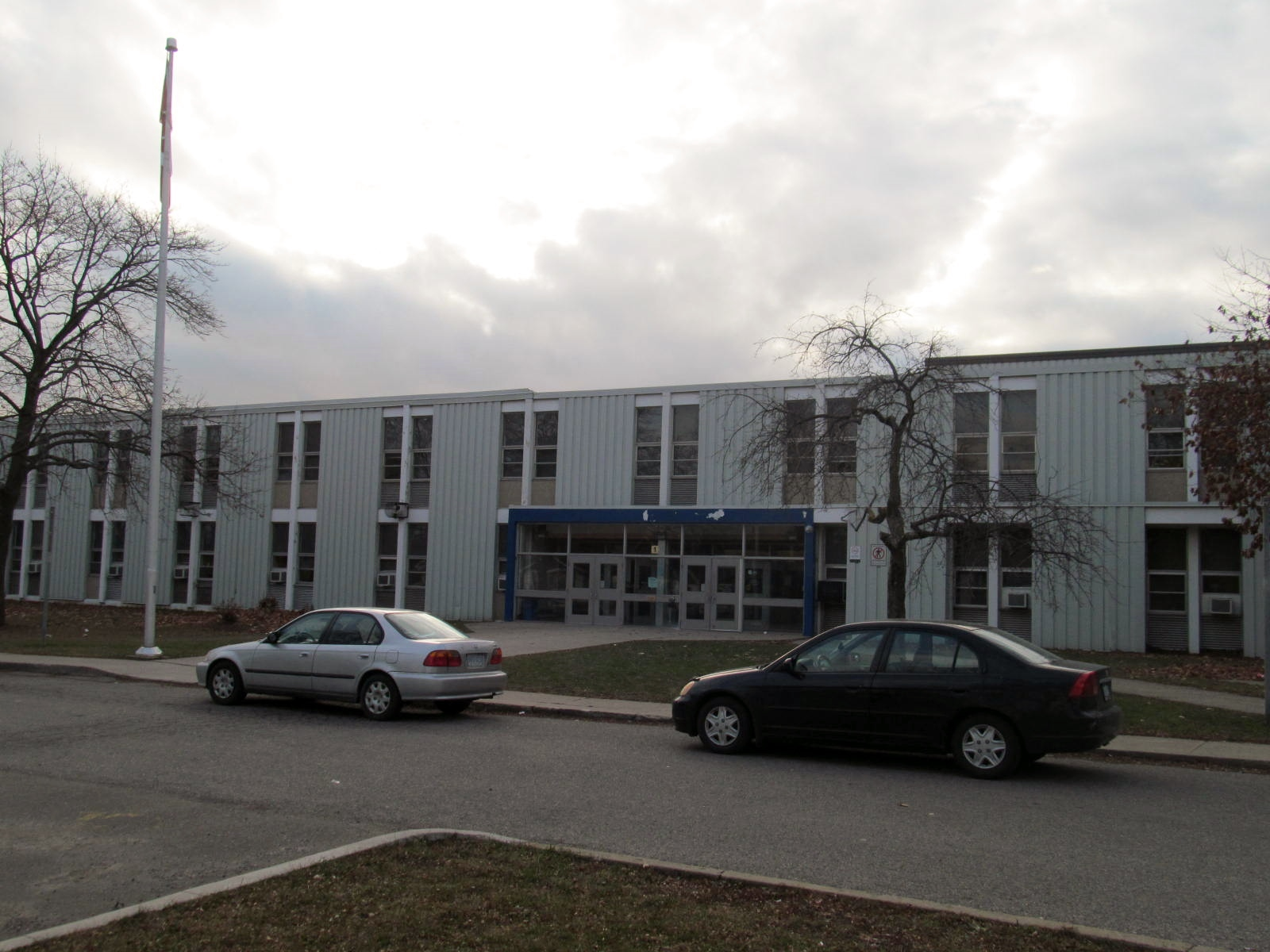
Scarborough Centre for Alternative Studies is a public alternative and adult school located in the neighbourhood.

Two public school boards operate schools in Scarborough Junction, the separate Toronto Catholic District School Board (TCDSB), and the secular Toronto District School Board (TDSB).

Both TCDSB, and TDSB operate public elementary schools in the neighbourhood. TCDSB operates two elementary schools, St. Joachim Catholic School, and St. Maria Goretti Catholic School.

TDSB several elementary schools in the neighbourhood. They include:

- Corvette Junior Public School
- Danforth Gardens Public School
- General Brock Public School
- J. G. Workman Public School
- Norman Cook Junior Public School
- Robert Service Senior Public School
- Walter Perry Junior Public School

TDSB is the public school board to operate a secondary institution in Scarborough Junction, Scarborough Centre for Alternative Studies. The institution operates as an alternative and adult school. The institution formerly operated as Midland Avenue Collegiate Institute, a TDSB secondary school that featured modernist designs such as a circular cafeteria.. The secondary school operated from 1962 to 2000.

TCDSB does not operate a secondary school in the area, with TCDSB secondary school students residing in Scarborough Junction attending institutions in adjacent neighbourhoods. The French first language public secular school board, Conseil scolaire Viamonde, and it separate counterpart, Conseil scolaire catholique MonAvenir also offer schooling to applicable residents of Scarborough Junction, although they do not operate a school in the neighbourhood, with CSCM/CSV students attending schools situated in other neighbourhoods in Toronto.
