= City Idol =

City Idol was a contest and part of a 2006 initiative called Who Runs This Town, a project to boost citizen interest and participation in municipal politics in Toronto.

== Overview ==
Who Runs This Town and City Idol were created by David Meslin, founder of the Toronto Public Space Committee. The City Idol contest sought out ordinary Torontonians to seek elected office in the 2006 municipal election on November 13. The goal was to have 100 candidates participate in a series of events whereby some would be voted off by a live audience. The "prize" was a campaign to run for Toronto city council, in the form of volunteer support (not funds). The first round was held at the Danforth Music Hall on April 28, 2006, and saw 70 candidates give one-minute speeches to an audience of more than 600 people who then voted for five candidates. A total of 48 candidates advanced to the second round regional runoffs.

After opening night, the winners were divided off for regional runoffs. The regions followed the same boundaries as Toronto's community council boundaries, which roughly follow old municipal boundaries prior to a forced municipal amalgamation in 1997. Because there were so many candidates in the Toronto-East York Regional Runoff, an extra semifinals event was held in which 24 candidates were narrowed down to six through a series of speeches and questions from the audience.

The format of the finals included short speeches, questions from contestants and the audience and a mock emergency press conference where candidates were told to research a topic prior to the event, and would have to address an emergency issue in a media scrum with reporters from Eye Weekly, NOW and Toronto Life.

== Winners ==
The winners of City Idol were

- North York: Bahar Aminvaziri
- Scarborough: Amarjeet Chhabra
- Toronto-East York: Desmond Cole
- Etobicoke-York: Arthur Roszak

The City Idol winners formally declared their candidacies on June 15. A number of other City Idol contestants who did not win the competition also stood as candidates.

Of the contest winners, Roszak had the most success in the general election, finishing second in his race.
