= Adrian Heaps =

Canadian politician

Toronto City Councillor for (Ward 35) Scarborough Southwest
- In office December 1, 2006 – November 30, 2010
- Preceded by: Gerry Altobello; Harvey Barron (interim)
- Succeeded by: Michelle Berardinetti

Personal details
- Born: c. 1954
- Spouse: Karen Albertson
- Relations: A. A. Heaps (Grandfather); Leo Heaps (Father)

Adrian A. Heaps (born c. 1954) is a former politician in Toronto, Ontario, Canada. He was the member of Toronto City Council for Scarborough Southwest Ward 35 from 2006 to 2010.

== Background ==
Heaps is the grandson of Abraham Albert Heaps, a leader of the Winnipeg General Strike, left-wing Member of Parliament in the 1920s and 1930s, and founding member of the Co-operative Commonwealth Federation. Heaps' father, Leo, received a military cross for service in World War II and was a New Democratic Party candidate in the 1979 federal election in the riding of Eglinton—Lawrence, while his son Toby was a senior staffer in Ralph Nader's 2004 US presidential campaign.

Heaps is a former vice-president of an independent music label. In the mid-1990s he worked on a First Nation reserve near Penetanguishene, Ontario. In 2004, he worked in Colombia as a volunteer for the Canadian International Development Agency helping several municipalities with development projects.

== Politics ==
In 1999, Heaps ran as the Liberal candidate in the 1999 provincial election in the riding of Scarborough Southwest. He finished second behind Progressive Conservative Dan Newman with 33.66% of the vote. He attempted to run again but failed to win the Liberal nomination for the 2003 provincial election. The same year he ran for Toronto City Council but came in second behind incumbent Gerry Altobello.

In 2006, he ran again for City Councillor after Altobello was appointed a justice of the peace. Heaps ran his campaign based on delivering better services by the city. He said, "The quality of services you receive is related to the quality of the representative you have." He defeated Michelle Berardinetti by 89 votes.

In early 2007, Berardinetti sued him for defamation due to an incident during the campaign. Berardinetti claimed that Heaps defamed her by distributing copies of an article in The Globe and Mail that endorsed him two days before the election. The article by columnist John Barber, who described himself as a former classmate of Heaps, endorsed him while belittling Berardinetti as little more than a nepotistic "pillow talker" of her MPP husband. Heaps denied distributing the article, however he and Berardinetti eventually settled out of court. In December, 2009, City Council voted to reimburse Heaps for both the settlement and legal expenses which amounted to $65,680. In January, 2010 Heaps elected to refuse the reimbursement.

In a related matter, City Council also decided to reimburse legal fees incurred by Heaps when a group called the Toronto Party for a Better City (TPBC) requested a compliance audit on Heaps' campaign expenses. The audit committee reviewed the expenses and found no evidence of improper financing but the group appealed the decision to a higher court. The legal fees for this process amounted to $45,330. City Council also authorized an additional payment since the reimbursement was deemed a taxable benefit. TPBC and fellow councillor Doug Holyday launched a second legal action to force Heaps to repay the money. Heaps had refused the reimbursement for the defamation lawsuit but still accepted the reimbursement for the compliance audit action, although he played no role in the council meeting where this took place. Instead he chose to excuse himself from the meeting so as not display any interest in the matter. In July 2010, the Divisional Court ruled that City Council had no authority to reimburse Heaps since he was a candidate at the time and not yet a councillor. In August 2010, City Council appealed that decision and went further by declaring the money to be a 'grant' rather than a 'reimbursement'. Mayor David Miller argued that anyone running for office should not be forced into paying large legal fees. He said, "Nobody in this city, unless you're really rich, can afford to run for public office and be subjected to $70,000 in legal fees." In December 2010, the court refused the city's request for an appeal. However, the court did not force Heaps to return the money.

During his time in office, he served as chair of the city's Cycling Advisory Committee and was an architect of much of Toronto's cycling route structure. He also served as chair of Disabilities Issues for Toronto and headed up committees involved in sports related activities such as the 2010 Winter Olympics torch relay and the 2015 Pan American Games. Citing workload issues Heaps declined an offer by Mayor David Miller to sit as a councillor-at-large on the city's powerful executive committee.

In the 2010 election, Heaps and Berardinetti again competed for the ward. One of the major issues was bike lanes in the ward. Berardinetti claimed that unconnected bike lanes on Pharmacy Avenue and Birchmount Road were leading some residents who lived on those streets to move out of the ward. Berardinetti, who described them as "bike lanes to nowhere", said that she would replace them with sharrows. Heaps said that the bike lanes were put in place by the previous councillor. He said that the best alternative was to link up the existing network rather than approve any more stand alone bike lanes. Heaps lost the election to Berardinetti by 2,203 votes. Councillor Heaps is also recognized for creating Warden Hilltop Community Centre - the first public building in Toronto to be LEED (Leadership in Energy and Environmental Design) Silver certified featuring a geothermal heating and cooling system, green roof and solar power.

In 2014, Heaps applied to be appointed by Toronto City Council to fill out the term of Ward 20 Councillor Adam Vaughan after the downtown councillor resigned his seat to successfully stand for parliament. Heaps was eliminated on the first ballot.

== Election results ==
2006 Toronto election, Ward 35
Candidate	Votes	%
Adrian Heaps	2,949	23.8%
Michelle Berardinetti	2,860	23.1%
Dan Harris	1,853	14.9%
Elizabeth Moyer	1,371	11.1%
Mike Kilpatrick	1,098	8.9%
Worrick Russell	786	6.3%
Sharif Ahmed	669	5.4%
Norman Lovatsis	436	3.5%
Jason Carey	113	0.9%
Armando Calderon	94	0.8%
Michael Brausewetter	89	0.7%
Tony Festino	52	0.4%
Axcel Cocon	30	0.2%
Total	12,400	100%

2010 Toronto election, Ward 35
Candidate	Votes	%
Michelle Berardinetti	8,293	50.46%
Adrian Heaps	6,020	36.62%
Malik Ahmad	850	5.17%
Victoria Doyle	429	2.61%
Ed Green	253	1.54%
John Lewis	183	1.11%
Jay Burnett	173	1.06%
Peter Tijiri	90	0.55%
John Morawietz	76	0.46%
Jason Woychesko	70	0.43%
Total	16,437	100%

Results as of October 26, 2010 03:55 AM. 42 out of 42 polls.
