= Parthi Kandavel =

Canadian politician

Toronto City Councillor for Ward 20 Scarborough Southwest
- Incumbent
- Assumed office November 30, 2023
- Preceded by: Gary Crawford

Other roles
- 2014–2022: TDSB Trustee

Personal details
- Party: Independent
- Spouse: Anu Sriskandarajah
- Occupation: Politician; teacher
- Website: parthikandavel.ca

Parthi Kandavel is a Canadian teacher and politician who represents Ward 20 Scarborough Southwest on Toronto City Council. He was elected during a by-election on November 30, 2023.

== Background ==
Prior to entering politics, Kandavel worked as a grade 6 school teacher in the Sathya Sai School of Toronto, Canada. His wife, Anu Sriskandarajah, is a Toronto District School Board (TDSB) trustee and ran for council in 2025 in Ward 25, losing to Neethan Shan.

== Political career ==
Kandavel served as a TDSB trustee for two terms from 2014 to 2022. He ran in the 2022 municipal election, finishing second place to Gary Crawford. Kandavel was elected to the seat in a 2023 by-election triggered by the resignation of Crawford.

Described as a "progressive", Kandavel ran on a platform of increasing daycare spaces, building road safety infrastructure and reducing inequality. He defines his political ideology as "sensible solutions that address inequity". Following his election, Kandavel met with Mayor Olivia Chow, who highlighted their shared commitment to affordable housing and child care.

In February 2026, Kandavel was mentioned as a possible candidate in the 2026 Scarborough Southwest provincial by-election, but he subsequently registered to seek re-election to Toronto City Council.

Kandavel was re-elected on October 26, 2026, with 12,231 votes (35.99 per cent), defeating Rupasinghe, who received 10,513 votes (30.93 per cent). The City Clerk certified the election results on October 29.

=== Ontario Provincial Police investigation ===
On May 10, 2026, Kandavel announced that he was the subject of an Ontario Provincial Police investigation. He said that he was surprised by the investigation and would respond to any allegations. On May 13, the Toronto Star reported allegations from sources that Kandavel had sought money from developers in connection with his support for their projects. Subsequent reporting described allegations from two individuals that Kandavel had requested six-figure payments to third parties while developments associated with them were proceeding through municipal approvals. These were reported allegations, not findings of wrongdoing. At a May 28 Scarborough Community Council meeting, Kandavel recused himself from decisions on zoning bylaw approvals in his ward amid the investigation.

== Electoral results ==
2026 Toronto municipal election, Ward 20 Scarborough Southwest
Candidate	Votes	%	± pp (vs. 2023)
Parthi Kandavel (X)	12,231	35.99	+8.61
Kevin Rupasinghe	10,513	30.93	+8.19
Sharmina Nasrin	3,013	8.86	—
Ariel-Rachel Karokis	2,573	7.57	—
Luigi Lisciandro	2,432	7.16	—
Mohammad Ali Reza	1,523	4.48	—
Laikul Choudhury	1,169	3.44	—
Naser Kaid	535	1.57	+1.49
Total valid votes	33,989	100.00	

November 30, 2023, Ward 20 Scarborough Southwest by-election
Candidate	Votes	%	± pp (vs. 2022)
Parthi Kandavel	4,641	27.38	−2.23
Kevin Rupasinghe	3,854	22.74	+9.05
Anna Sidiropoulos	2,275	13.42	—
Malika Ghous	1,565	9.23	—
Suman Roy	1,289	7.60	—
Alamgir Hussain	1,130	6.67	—
Sudip Shome	555	3.27	—
Reginald Tull	399	2.35	—
Marzia Hoque	209	1.23	—
Corey David	190	1.12	−1.51
Jessica Hines	190	1.12	—
Malik Ahmad	162	0.96	−2.07
MD Abdullah Al Mamun	148	0.87	—
Thomas Hall	77	0.45	—
Angus MacKenzie	56	0.33	—
Trevor Sutton	47	0.28	—
Walayat Khan	41	0.24	—
Anthony Internicola	27	0.16	—
Sandeep Srivastava	24	0.14	—
Peter Handjis	22	0.13	—
Manny Zanders	21	0.12	—
Syed Jaffery	15	0.09	—
Naser Kaid	13	0.08	—

2022 Toronto municipal election, Ward 20 Scarborough Southwest
Candidate	Votes	%	± pp
Gary Crawford (X)	8,216	35.07	—
Parthi Kandavel	6,936	29.61	—
Kevin Rupasinghe	3,208	13.69	—
Lorenzo Berardinetti	2,773	11.84	—
Malik Ahmad	709	3.03	—
Corey David	615	2.63	—
Sharif Ahmed	608	2.60	—
Philip Mills	363	1.55	—
