= Gary Crawford (politician) =

Canadian politician (born 1960)

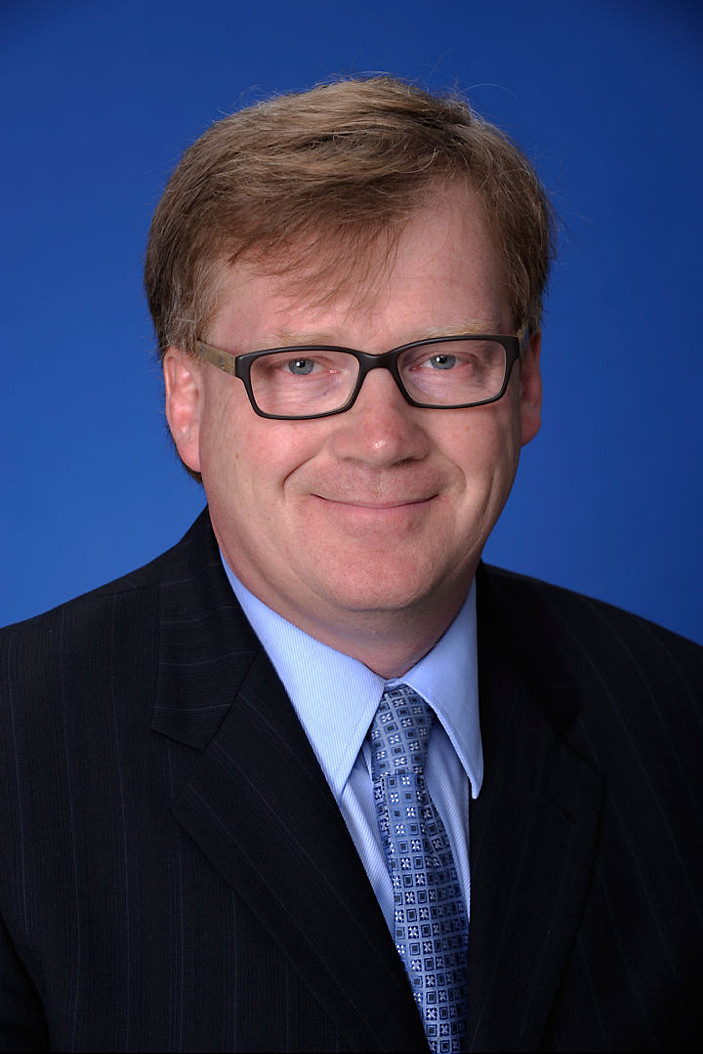
- Crawford in 2010

Toronto City Councillor
- In office December 1, 2018 – July 26, 2023
- Succeeded by: Parthi Kandavel
- Constituency: Ward 20 Scarborough Southwest
- In office December 1, 2010 – December 1, 2018
- Preceded by: Brian Ashton
- Constituency: Ward 36 Scarborough Southwest

Toronto District School Board Trustee for Ward 18 Scarborough Southwest
- In office December 1, 2003 – December 1, 2010
- Preceded by: Elizabeth Moyer
- Succeeded by: Elizabeth Moyer

Personal details
- Born: July 15, 1960 (age 66) Halifax, Nova Scotia
- Party: Independent
- Other political affiliations: Ontario Progressive Conservative
- Occupation: Politician (previously: Grocery manager)

Gary Crawford (born July 15, 1960) is a Canadian politician who was a member of Toronto City Council from 2010 to 2023. Crawford represented Ward 20 Scarborough Southwest and its predecessor, Ward 36. From 2003 to 2010, he served as the Toronto District School Board (TDSB) trustee for Scarborough Southwest. Crawford ran as an Ontario Progressive Conservative Party candidate in the 2007 and 2023 provincial elections.

== Political career ==
Crawford was elected as a TDSB trustee in 2003, representing Scarborough Southwest. During his seven-year tenure, he was variously appointed as co-chair of the board, chair of facilities management, and chair of negotiations. Crawford, who was previously a professional artist and part-time musician, is an advocate for arts and culture and was involved in funding increases for the arts.

Crawford ran as a candidate for the Progressive Conservative Party of Ontario during the 2007 Ontario general election, but was defeated by Liberal candidate Lorenzo Berardinetti.

He was elected to the Toronto City Council in the 2010 municipal election to succeed Brian Ashton representing Scarborough Southwest, and was re-elected in 2014. As a city councillor, Crawford served as Mayor John Tory's budget chief from 2014 to 2023 and served on numerous committees including Budget, Planning and Growth, Economic Development, and the Executive Committee.

Crawford resigned his seat as city councillor in 2023 to run as a candidate for the Progressive Conservative Party of Ontario in the Scarborough—Guildwood provincial by-election. He was defeated by Liberal candidate Andrea Hazell.

In addition to his elected positions, Crawford has served on the boards of the East Metro Youth Centre, the Harbourfront Centre, the St. Lawrence Centre for the Performing Arts, the Toronto Centre for the Arts, the Toronto Arts Council, and as interim chair of the Sony Centre for the Performing Arts. He has also chaired the Mayor's Task Force on the Arts, the Theatres Working Group, and co-chaired the Film Board.

== Election results ==
2022 Toronto election, Ward 20
Candidate	Votes	%
Gary Crawford	8,216	35.07%
Parthi Kandavel	6,936	29.61%
Kevin Rupasinghe	3,208	13.69%
Lorenzo Berardinetti	2,773	11.84%
Malik Ahma	709	3.03%
Corey David	615	2.63%
Sharif Ahmed	608	2.60%
Philip Mills	363	1.55%
Total	23,428	100%

Clerk's Official Declaration of 2022 Results

2018 Toronto election, Ward 36
Candidate	Votes	%
Gary Crawford	10,505	35.73%
Michelle Holland-Berardinetti	10,094	34.33%
Mohsin Bhuiyan	2,910	9.90%
Paulina Corpuz	1,813	6.17%
Suman Roy	1,582	5.38%
Gerard Arbour	1,187	4.04%
Curtis Smith	541	1.84%
Robert McDermott	367	1.25%
Bruce Waters	246	0.84%
John Letonja	160	0.54%
Total	29,405	100%

Clerk's Official Declaration of 2018 Results

2014 Toronto election, Ward 36
Candidate	Votes	%
Gary Crawford	10,833	52.805%
Robert Spencer	6,390	31.148%
Joy Robertson	994	4.845%
Masihullah Mohebzada	795	3.875%
Robert McDermott	638	3.110%
Ed Green	447	2.179%
Christian Tobin	320	1.560%
Andre Musters	98	0.478%
Total	20,515	100%

Clerk's Official Declaration of 2014 Results

2010 Toronto election, Ward 36
Candidate	Votes	%
Gary Crawford	4,392	25.249%
Robert Spencer	3,970	22.823%
Diane Hogan	2,341	13.458%
Sean Gladney	2,233	12.837%
Eddy Gasparotto	1,727	9.928%
Marvin Macaraig	866	4.978%
Vicki Breen	663	3.811%
Robert McDermott	518	2.978%
Tony Ashdown	475	2.731%
Roman Danilov	210	1.207%
Total	17,395	100%

2010 City Clerk's Official Declaration
