= Gerry Altobello =

Former city councillor in Toronto, Canada

Toronto City Councillor for (Ward 35) Scarborough Southwest
- In office December 1, 2000 – June 14, 2006
- Preceded by: new ward
- Succeeded by: Harvey Barron (interim); Adrian Heaps

Toronto City Councillor for Scarborough Bluffs (Ward 13)
- In office January 1, 1998 – November 30, 2000
- Preceded by: Ward established
- Succeeded by: Ward abolished

Alderman, Ward 2, City of Scarborough, Ontario
- In office 1985–1997
- Preceded by: Harvey Barron
- Succeeded by: Ward abolished

Personal details
- Born: December 31, 1953 aged 69
- Occupation: Justice of the peace

Gerry Altobello is a former city councillor in Toronto, Ontario, Canada who now works as a justice of the peace. He represented Scarborough Southwest.

Altobello first entered politics in 1985 when he was elected to the council of Scarborough to represent Ward 2, defeating more left-leaning candidate Barry Boyle. At 27, he was the youngest member on the council. He was re-elected with ease in 1988, but in 1991 he faced a fierce election battle against businessman Danny Lovatsis. Nevertheless, he was re-elected.

He opposed the amalgamation of Scarborough, Toronto, and four other municipalities in 1997, but after it occurred he ran for a seat on Toronto city council in Ward 13. The ward structure at the time was such that the two candidates who received the most votes were elected in each riding. He was elected along with Brian Ashton. Fellow Scarborough city councillor Fred Johnson came in third. He has chaired the Planning and Transportation Committee. A centrist, he was aligned with the Liberal Party.

On June 9, 2006, he was appointed a justice of the peace by the Attorney General of Ontario Michael Bryant, effective June 21, 2006. On June 14, 2006, he resigned as a councillor. As a justice of the peace, he presided over the trial of a homeowner accused of renting out the house for short-term tenants.
