= Ward 20 Scarborough Southwest =

Municipal council district in Toronto, Ontario, Canada

- Constituency for the Toronto City Council
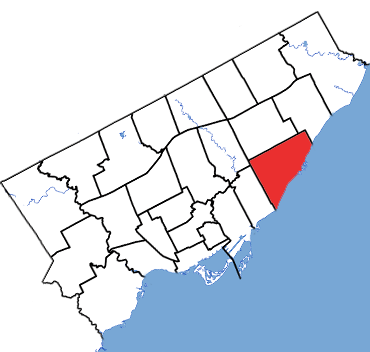
- Ward 20 Scarborough Southwest
- City: Toronto
- Population: 111,194 (2021)

Current constituency
- Created: 2018
- Councillor: Parthi Kandavel

Ward 20 Scarborough Southwest is a municipal ward in Toronto, Ontario, Canada. It has been represented by Parthi Kandavel since 2023.

== Boundaries ==
On August 14, 2018, the Government of Ontario redrew municipal boundaries via the Better Local Government Act, 2018, S.O. 2018, c. 11 - Bill 5. This means that the 25 provincial electoral districts and the 25 municipal wards in Toronto currently share the same geographic borders.

Defined in legislation as:

Consisting of that part of the City of Toronto described as follows: commencing at the intersection of Eglinton Avenue East and Markham Road; thence southerly along Markham Road and its southerly production to the southerly limit of said city; thence generally southwesterly along said limit to the southerly production of Victoria Park Avenue; thence generally northerly along said production and Victoria Park Avenue to Eglinton Avenue East; thence easterly along said avenue to the point of commencement.

It contains the neighbourhoods of Birch Cliff, Birch Cliff Heights, Clairlea, Cliffcrest, Cliffside, Fallingbrook, Hunt Club, Oakridge, Scarborough Junction, and the western half of Scarborough Village.

== History ==
=== 2018 boundary adjustment ===
Toronto municipal ward boundaries were significantly modified in 2018 during the election campaign. Ultimately the new ward structure was used and later upheld by the Supreme Court of Canada in 2021.

From 2000 to 2018, Scarborough Southwest was represented on city council by Wards 35 (northern half) and 36 (southern half). From 1998 to 2000 the area generally corresponded to Ward 13 (Scarborough Bluffs) on City Council, and returned two members. From 1988 to 1997 Scarborough Bluffs was represented on Metropolitan Toronto Council until Scarborough's amalgamation into the city.

== Councillors ==
Council term	Member	
Council term	Scarborough Bluffs (Metro Council)	
1988–1991	Brian Ashton	
1991–1994	Brian Ashton	
1994–1997	Brian Ashton	
	Ward 13 Scarborough Bluffs	
1997–2000	Brian Ashton, Gerry Altobello	
	Ward 35 Scarborough Southwest	Ward 36 Scarborough Southwest
2000–2003	Gerry Altobello (until June 2006); Harvey Barron (interim)	Brian Ashton
2003–2006	Gerry Altobello (until June 2006); Harvey Barron (interim)	Brian Ashton
2006–2010	Adrian Heaps	Brian Ashton
2010–2014	Michelle Berardinetti (Holland after 2006)	Gary Crawford
2014–2018	Michelle Berardinetti (Holland after 2006)	Gary Crawford
	Ward 20 Scarborough Southwest	
2018–2022	Gary Crawford	
2022–2026	Gary Crawford	
2022–2026	Gary Crawford (until July 2023); Parthi Kandavel (since November 2023)	
2026–2030	Parthi Kandavel	

== Election results ==
=== 2026 ===
Candidate	Votes	%	minus
Parthi Kandavel (X)	12,231	35.99	8.61* ▲
Kevin Rupasinghe	10,513	30.93	8.19* ▲
Sharmina Nasrin	3,013	8.86	–
Ariel-Rachel Karokis	2,573	7.57	–
Luigi Lisciandro	2,432	7.16	–
Mohammad Ali Reza	1,523	4.48	–
Laikul Choudhury	1,169	3.44	–
Naser Kaid	535	1.57	–

Compared to by-election*

=== 2023 by-election ===
The seat was temporarily vacant between July 26, 2023 and November 30, 2023 following the resignation of Gary Crawford who ran in the 2023 Scarborough—Guildwood provincial by-election. A by-election was called in the ward, and was held on November 30 with Parthi Kandavel being elected as the new incoming councillor.

Election Result

Parthi Kandavel was elected councillor of Ward 20 Scarborough Southwest on November 30, 2023 with 27.38% of the vote.

Candidate	Vote	%
Parthi Kandavel	4,641	27.38
Kevin Rupasinghe	3,854	22.74
Anna Sidiropoulos	2,275	13.42
Malika Ghous	1,565	9.23
Suman Roy	1,289	7.60
Alamgir Hussain	1,130	6.67
Sudip Shome	555	3.27
Reginald Tull	399	2.35
Marzia Hoque	209	1.23
Corey David	190	1.12
Jessica Hines	190	1.12
Malik Ahmad	162	0.96
MD Abdullah Al Mamun	148	0.87
Thomas Hall	77	0.45
Angus MacKenzie	56	0.33
Trevor Sutton	47	0.28
Walayat Khan	41	0.24
Anthony Internicola	27	0.16
Sandeep Srivastava	24	0.14
Peter Handjis	22	0.13
Manny Zanders	21	0.12
Syed Jaffery	15	0.09
Naser Kaid	13	0.08

Registered candidates

- Malik Ahmad, ran here in 2022 and 2010.
- Corey David, ran here in 2022. "Socialist Alliance" candidate.
- Malika Ghous, current Toronto District School Board Trustee. Former intern for Liberal MP Salma Zahid. Endorsed by Zahid and Liberal MP Yasir Naqvi. Tied to allegations of voter fraud.
- Thomas Hall, ran for mayor in the 2023 Toronto mayoral by-election, winning 258 votes.
- Peter Handjis, ran for mayor in the 2022 Toronto mayoral election and 2023 Toronto mayoral by-election. Doctored an image of mayor Olivia Chow claiming she was voting for him.
- Jessica Hines, business consultant and former operations manager at Black Urbanism TO.
- Marzia Hoque, secretary of the Scarborough Southwest federal Liberal Party.
- Alamgir Hussain, ran for the New Democratic Party in the 2008 Canadian federal election. Has since become a Conservative Party of Canada donor.
- Anthony Internicola, municipal candidate in Ward 40, Scarborough—Agincourt in 2014, finishing 3rd of 3 candidates, in Ward 23 Scarborough North in 2018, finishing 11th of 11 candidates, in the 2021 Ward 22 Scarborough—Agincourt by-election, finishing 23rd of 27 candidates, and in Ward 22 Scarborough—Agincourt in 2022, finishing 6th of 6 candidates. Also ran for the People's Party of Canada in Scarborough—Agincourt in the 2019 Canadian federal election.
- Syed Jaffery, ran for the People's Party of Canada in the 2021 Canadian federal election, and has run for Mississauga City Council.
- Naser Kaid, ran for school trustee in 2014 and 2022.
- Parthi Kandavel, teacher and former Toronto District School Board Trustee. Ran here in 2022. Considered a progressive.
- Walayat Khan, ran for city council in Scarborough—Agincourt in 2021.
- Angus Mackenzie
- MD Abdullah Al Mamun
- Suman Roy, chef and activist, founded Scarborough Food Security Initiative. Ran here in 2018 and was endorsed by Progress Toronto at the time. Considered a progressive. Endorsed by councillor Jennifer McKelvie. Has been accused of dubious financial dealings.
- Kevin Rupasinghe, transportation planner and community activist. Ran here in 2022 and was endorsed by Progress Toronto at the time. Considered a progressive. Endorsed by city councillors Shelley Carroll and Amber Morley, the Toronto and York Region Labour Council, Local 113 of the Amalgamated Transit Union and NDP MPPs Kristyn Wong-Tam and Bhutila Karpoche.
- Sudip Shome Considered a Conservative, endorsed by former Ward 20 Councillor Gary Crawford
- Anna Sidiropoulos, businesswoman. Ran in this ward for Toronto District School Board in 2022, losing by 63 votes.
- Sandeep Srivastava, has run for city council multiple times and for mayor in the 2022 Toronto mayoral election and the 2023 Toronto mayoral by-election, winning 31 and 166 votes respectively. Accused of plagiarizing campaign materials.
- Trevor Sutton, ran as an independent in the 2006 Canadian federal election.
- Reginald Tull, ran for mayor in the 2022 Toronto mayoral election and the 2023 Toronto mayoral by-election and as an independent in the 2023 Scarborough—Guildwood provincial by-election. Has made transphobic and COVID-19 conspiracy theory tweets in the past.
- Manny Zanders

=== 2022 ===
Candidate	Vote	%
Gary Crawford	8,216	35.07
Parthi Kandavel	6,936	29.61
Kevin Rupasinghe	3,208	13.69
Lorenzo Berardinetti	2,773	11.84
Malik Ahmad	709	3.03
Corey David	615	2.63
Sharif Ahmed	608	2.60
Philip Mills	363	1.55

=== 2018 ===
Candidate	Vote	%
Gary Crawford	10,505	35.73
Michelle Holland-Berardinetti	10,094	34.33
Mohsin Bhuiyan	2,910	9.90
Paulina Corpuz	1,813	6.17
Suman Roy	1,582	5.38
Gerard Arbour	1,187	4.04
Curtis Smith	541	1.84
Robert McDermott	367	1.25
Bruce Waters	246	0.84
John Letonja	160	0.54

=== 2014 ===
==== Ward 35 ====
Council Candidate	Vote	%
Michelle Berardinetti	11,919	63.25
Paul Bocking	2,722	14.44
Sharif Arhmed	927	4.92
Christopher Upwood	890	4.72
Shahid Uddin	831	4.41
Teferi Assefa	487	2.58
Anwarul Kabir	403	2.14
Saima Shaikh	389	2.06
Jason Woychesko	277	1.47

==== Ward 36 ====
Council Candidate	Vote	%
Gary Crawford	10,833	52.81
Robert Spencer	6,390	31.15
Joy Robertson	994	4.85
Masihullah Mohebzada	795	3.88
Robert McDermott	638	3.11
Ed Green	447	2.18
Christian Tobin	320	1.56
Andre Musters	98	0.48

=== 2010 ===
==== Ward 35 ====
Council Candidate	Vote	%
Michelle Berardinetti	8,293	50.45
Adrian Heaps	6,020	36.62
Malik Ahmad	850	5.17
Victoria Doyle	429	2.61
Ed Green	253	1.54
John Lewis	183	1.11
Jay Burnett	173	1.05
Peter Tijiri	90	0.55
John Morawietz	76	0.46
Jason Woychesko	70	0.43

==== Ward 36 ====
Council Candidate	Vote	%
Gary Crawford	4,392	25.25
Robert Spencer	3,970	22.82
Diane Hogan	2,341	13.46
Sean Gladney	2,233	12.84
Eddy Gasparotto	1,727	9.93
Marvin Macaraig	866	4.98
Vicki Breen	663	3.81
Robert McDermott	518	2.98
Tony Ashdown	475	2.73
Roman Danilov	210	1.21

=== 2006 ===
==== Ward 35 ====
Council Candidate	Vote	%
Adrian Heaps	2,949	23.78
Michelle Berardinetti	2,860	23.06
Dan Harris	1,853	14.94
Elizabeth Moyer	1,371	11.06
Michael Kilpatrick	1,098	8.85
Worrick Russell	786	6.34
Sharif Arhmed	669	5.40
Norman Lovatsis	436	3.52
Jason Carey	113	0.91
Armando Calderon	94	0.76
Michael Brausewetter	89	0.72
Tony Festino	52	0.42
Axcel Cocon	30	0.24

==== Ward 36 ====
Council Candidate	Vote	%
Brian Ashton	9,717	77.68
Eddy Gasparotto	1,597	12.77
Greg Compton	828	6.62
Ron Sonier	367	2.93

=== 2003 ===
==== Ward 35 ====
Council Candidate	Vote	%
Gerry Altobello	5,410	45.56
Adrian Heaps	3,388	28.53
Worrick Russell	1,651	13.90
Peter Harris	550	4.63
Barry Nicholson	326	2.75
Kalonji Muteba	279	2.35
Jason Carey	271	2.28

==== Ward 36 ====
Council Candidate	Vote	%
Brian Ashton	11,683	78.05
Robert Scott	3,286	21.95

=== 2000 ===
==== Ward 35 ====
Council Candidate	Vote	%
Gerry Altobello	7,118	64.86
Worrick Russell	3,290	29.98
Tao Gold	566	5.16

==== Ward 36 ====
Council Candidate	Vote	%
Brian Ashton	9,374	71.80
Robert Scott	3,682	28.20

=== 1997 ===
Two to be elected

Council Candidate	Vote	%
Brian Ashton	15,528	30.16
Gerry Altobello	12,605	24.48
Fred Johnston	11,265	21.88
Gaye Dale	6,491	12.61
Karin Eaton	4,670	9.07
Ed Green	931	1.81

=== 1994 ===
Council Candidate	Vote	%
Brian Ashton	13,191	72.70
Randall Bentley	4,953	27.30

=== 1991 ===
Council Candidate	Vote	%
Brian Ashton	11,398	74.05
Frank Duckworth	3,994	25.95

=== 1988 ===
Council Candidate	Vote	%
Brian Ashton	9,957	54.39
Bill Belfontaine	8,348	45.61
