= Michael Walker (politician) =

Canadian politician (born 1940)

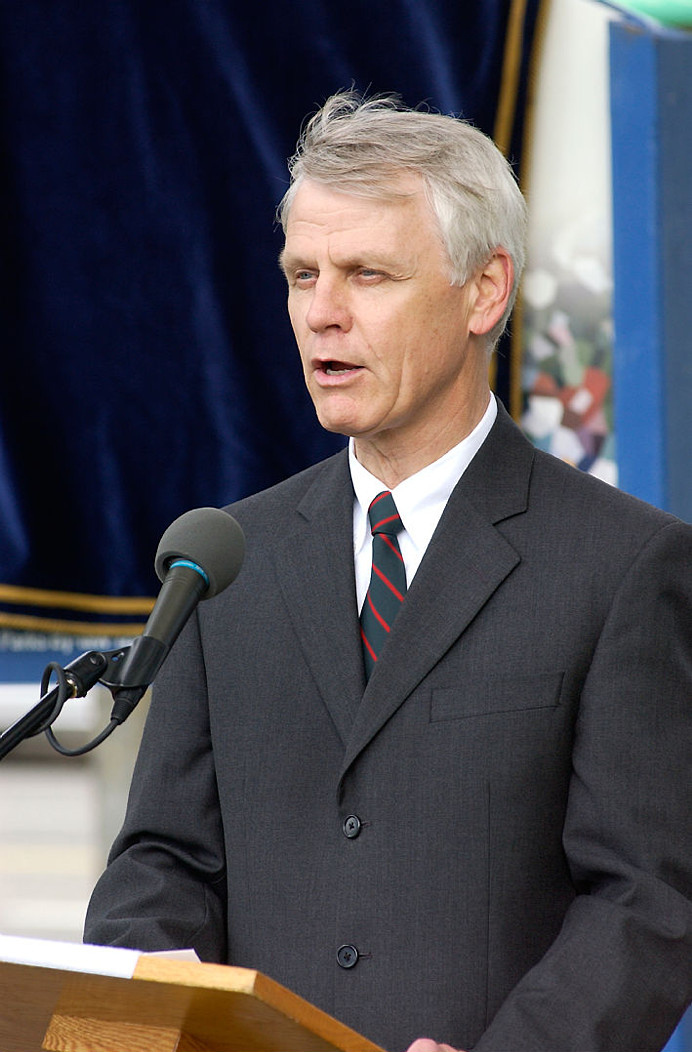
- Walker in 2004

Toronto City Councillor for (Ward 22) St. Paul's
- In office December 1, 2000 – November 30, 2010
- Preceded by: Riding established
- Succeeded by: Josh Matlow

Toronto City Councillor for (Ward 22) North Toronto
- In office January 1, 1998 – November 30, 2000
- Preceded by: Ward Created
- Succeeded by: Ward Abolished

Toronto City Councillor for Ward 16
- In office December 1, 1985 – December 31, 1997
- Preceded by: Ward Created
- Succeeded by: Ward Abolished

Toronto City Councillor for Ward 10
- In office December 1, 1982 – November 30, 1985
- Preceded by: Andrew Paton
- Succeeded by: Ward Abolished

Michael Walker (born 1940) is a former Canadian politician. He was a Toronto, Ontario city councillor from 1982 to 2010.

Walker was the City Councillor for Ward 22 (St. Paul's East) from 1982 to 2010. Ward 22 is bounded on the north by Eglinton Avenue and Broadway Avenue, on the east by Bayview Avenue, on the west by Spadina Avenue, and on the south by Moore Avenue and along the North Toronto Rail Line.

Walker, spurred on by a coalition of neighborhood groups (Federal of North Toronto Residents Associations) vigorously opposed to the development of the Minto Midtown project, which substantially exceeded the existing height and density limits when it was proposed in 2000.

Walker was first elected in the ward in 1982.

He is viewed as an independent and almost never sided with the left or right factions on the city council. His reluctance to choose sides meant that he was rarely appointed to important city committees. It was not until the 2003 term of office that he was appointed chair of the Administration Committee.

A long-time advocate of campaign finance reform, Walker is also known for having been one of only two Toronto City Councillors who did not accept corporate donations.

== Election results ==
2006 Toronto election, Ward 22
Candidate	Votes	%
Michael Walker	11,899	78.2
Rob Newman	2,506	16.5
Gord Reynolds	805	5.3
