= Brian Ashton (politician) =

Canadian politician

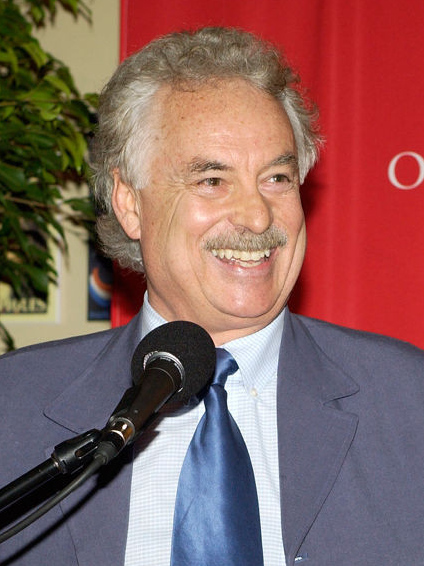
- Ashton in 2005

Toronto City Councillor for Ward 36 Scarborough Southwest
- In office December 1, 1997 – November 30, 2010
- Preceded by: new ward
- Succeeded by: Gary Crawford

Metropolitan Toronto Councillor for Ward 13 Scarborough Bluffs
- In office January 1, 1988 – November 30, 1997
- Preceded by: Ward established
- Succeeded by: Ward abolished

Scarborough Executive Alderman for Ward 7
- In office 1984–1988
- Preceded by: Ed Fulton
- Succeeded by: Fred Johnson

Metropolitan Toronto Police Services Board Member
- In office 1992–1996

Metropolitan Toronto Police Services Vice-Chair
- In office 1993–1996

Chair of the Toronto Transit Commission
- In office 2000–2002
- Preceded by: Howard Moscoe
- Succeeded by: Betty Disero

Personal details
- Born: March 5, 1950 (age 76) East York
- Spouse: Linda
- Occupation: Research assistant

Brian Ashton is a former Canadian politician who served as a city councillor in Toronto, Ontario. Ashton represented Ward 36 Scarborough Southwest from amalgamation in 1997 to 2010. He did not run for re-election in the 2010 municipal election and was succeeded by Gary Crawford. Following retirement, he was elected president of the Canadian National Exhibition each year from 2012 to 2016. He was first elected in 1984 as a Scarborough alderman, before being elected to Metro Toronto Council in 1988 until amalgamation in 1997.

== Career ==
Ashton has been involved in local politics since 1972, and worked as the research assistant to Scarborough mayor Gus Harris.

He was first elected to the city council of Scarborough in a 1984 by-election. He also served jointly on Metro Council for the ward of Scarborough Bluffs. Originally a member of the social democratic New Democratic Party, he declared himself unaffiliated, but was regarded as one of the more progressive members of the council. He also became known for his outspokenness, appearing frequently in the media. Chris Stockwell famously described him as "someone who carries a Tory membership card, talks like a Liberal, and votes like a New Democrat."

When Metro Council was separated from the city councils in 1988, Ashton ran for election to Metro Council and defeated Scarborough controller Bill Belfontaine. On Metro Council, he was best known for spearheading Toronto's failed bid for Expo 2000, which was awarded to Hanover, Germany by a narrow margin of one vote.

He went on to launch in the early 1990s and chair several innovative and progressive task forces: Social Development Strategy, Youth Task Force, and Gun Control Task Force.

He was a prominent opponent of Metro chairman Alan Tonks and was frequently considered to have ambitions to replace him. After being re-elected in the 1994 election, Ashton ran for the position when Metro councillors elected a new chairman. Running with the unreserved endorsement of the Toronto Star, his campaign ended when NDP and left-liberal councillors moved their support to Joe Pantalone. Ashton ended up receiving only three votes and Tonks won re-election.

When the former six municipalities and Metropolitan Toronto regional government were amalgamated into Canada's largest city government, Ashton was elected to the council of the new city of Toronto in 1997.

He quickly campaigned for the establishment of a standing committee responsible for economic development. Shortly thereafter Ashton became the first chair of the Economic Development and Parks Committee for the new city.

In 2006, Ashton's passion and belief in the economic benefits of a world expo saw him champion and chair a bid for the 2015 World's Fair. Core to his vision was siting the fair on Toronto's portlands and using the fair to accelerate the urbanization of this forgotten part of Toronto's waterfront. The 2015 fair was Toronto's to lose. Despite City and Federal government support, Premier Dalton McGuinty's Liberal government failed to fall behind the bid and it died.

In 2000, Ashton was appointed chair of the Toronto Transit Commission. An opponent of mayor Mel Lastman, he backed David Miller for mayor in the 2003 election.

Ashton continued to retain his maverick streak. In 2006, he voted to censure Howard Moscoe for leaking information from a confidential meeting, but decided against removing Moscoe as TTC chairman for giving Bombardier a non-bid contract. Moscoe retained his post but was forced to make an apology to David Shiner who faced a lawsuit as a result of the leak.

Ashton retained his council seat in the 2006 municipal election and was one of the few outsiders appointed to the Mayor's new executive committee. In 2007, Miller proposed a $60 vehicle-registration tax and 1.5% land transfer tax. Miller argued that the new measures were essential to sustaining the city's budget, without reducing services or raising property taxes. The Canadian Taxpayers Federation and Toronto Board of Trade were opposed on the grounds that it would hurt businesses, with polls showing that 70% of respondents supported cutting expenditures instead of raising taxes. Ashton himself supported the taxes and maintained that he would vote for them in October. He became the deciding vote against immediately implementing the measures which passed 23–22, as the motion deferred the debate until after the October 2007 provincial election.

Ashton defended his decision to break with Miller's allies, citing the numerous complaints from his constituents against the new taxes, and saying that he maintained his independence and that he expected to lose his committee seat. Ashton also alleged that Miller had called him an `a--hole' right after the vote, while Gord Perks called him a weasel. As a result of his failure to support the vote, Ashton was forced to resign from the executive committee. Ashton also voted against both taxes when council met to consider the matter after the provincial election.

In 2008, Ashton complained about a proposed wind farm 2 km off the shore of Scarborough would mar its natural beauty. He said "I think putting a wind farm off the [Scarborough] Bluffs is like throwing paint on the Mona Lisa."

Preceded by Howard Moscoe	Chair of the Toronto Transit Commission; 2000–2002	Succeeded by Betty Disero
