= Lorenzo Berardinetti =

Canadian politician (born 1961)

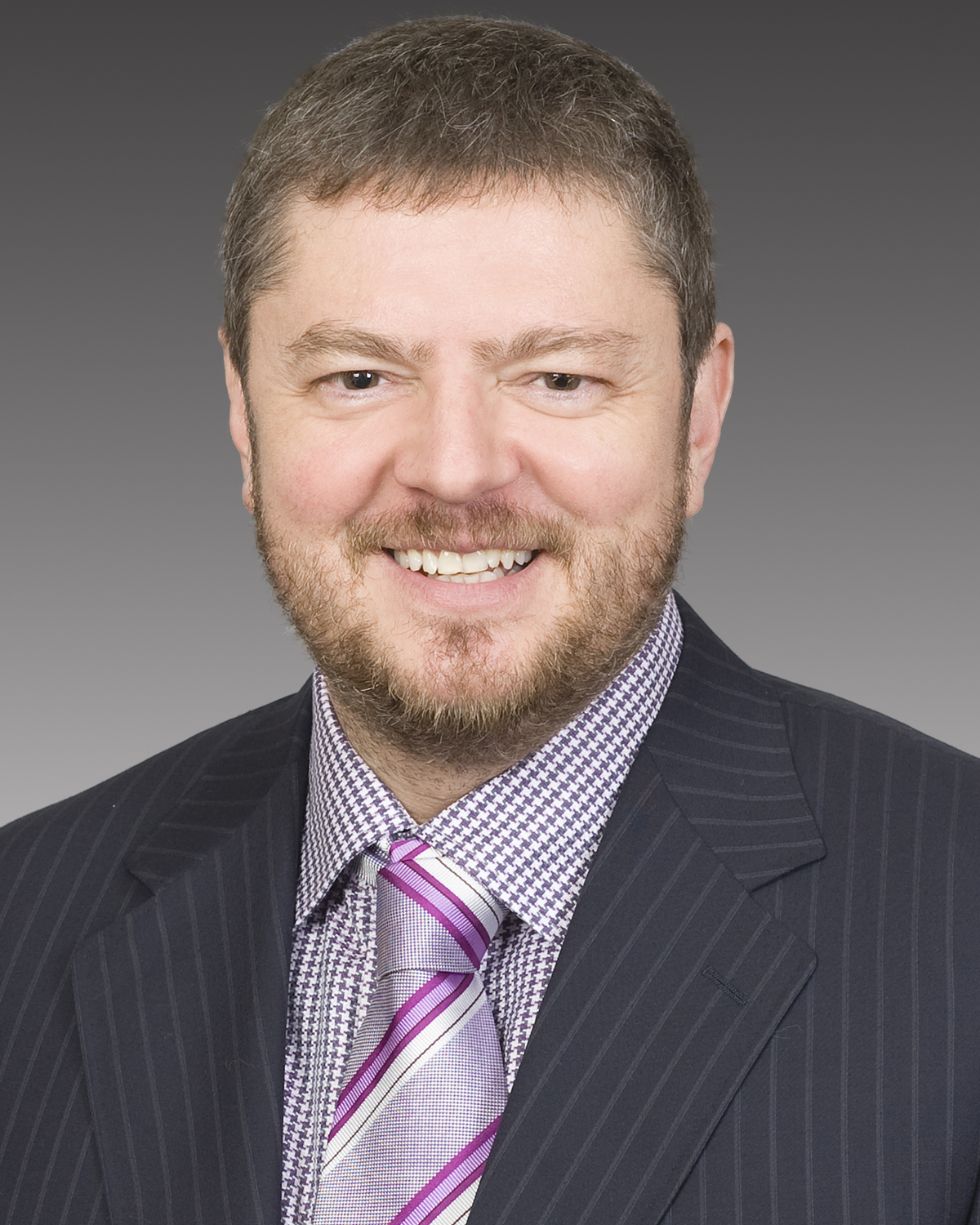

Ontario MPP
- In office October 2, 2003 – May 8, 2018
- Preceded by: Dan Newman
- Succeeded by: Doly Begum
- Constituency: Scarborough Southwest

Toronto City Councillor for Ward 37 Scarborough Centre
- In office January 1, 1998 – October 2, 2003
- Preceded by: Ward established
- Succeeded by: Michael Thompson

Scarborough City Councillor for Ward 4
- In office January 1, 1989 – December 31, 1996
- Preceded by: Kurt Christensen
- Succeeded by: Ward abolished due to amalgamation of Scarborough with Toronto

Personal details
- Born: 21 October 1961 (age 65) Scarborough, Ontario, Canada
- Party: Liberal
- Spouse: Michelle Holland (m. 2004; div. 2018)
- Occupation: Lawyer
- Portfolio: Deputy government whip (2003–2007)

Lorenzo Berardinetti (born 21 October 1961) is a former politician in Ontario, Canada. He was a Liberal member of the Legislative Assembly of Ontario from 2003 to 2018 who represented the Toronto riding of Scarborough Southwest.

== Background ==
Berardinetti was born in Scarborough, and is a lawyer by profession. He attended the University of Toronto and the University of Windsor Law School, and was called to the Ontario Bar in 1988. On October 25, 2010, Berardinetti's then-wife Michelle won election as a Toronto City Councillor. They married in 2004 and divorced in 2018. Berardinetti's cousin is politician Michael Colle and first cousin once removed is Toronto City Councillor Josh Colle. As a child, he and Colle lived in the same house in downtown Toronto. They would later serve together as MPPs in Queen's Park.

== Politics ==
=== Municipal ===
Berardinetti was a councillor in the pre-amalgamation Scarborough Council from 1988 to 1996, and represented Ward 37 (Scarborough Centre) on the amalgamated Toronto City Council from 1997 to 2003. In 1997, he served as chair of Toronto's administration committee, which created the framework for a unified civic administration in the amalgamated city. Berardinetti was generally regarded as an ally of Toronto mayor Mel Lastman during his years on the Toronto council.

=== Provincial ===
In the provincial election of 2003, Berardinetti defeated incumbent Progressive Conservative Dan Newman by about 6,000 votes in Scarborough Southwest. The Liberals won a majority government under Dalton McGuinty in this election, and Berardinetti was appointed the deputy government whip on 23 October 2003. He was re-elected in 2007, 2011, and 2014.

In 2004, he introduced a private member's bill, to outlaw what he called "gender-based pricing," whereby prices for equivalent or similar products and services, such as clothing, dry cleaning and haircuts, may vary between women and men. He contended women were charged much more for many products and services. The bill reached only second reading before it died on the order paper.

During his time in the government, Berardinetti was a Parliamentary Assistant to the Minister of Labour (2010-2011) and PA to the Attorney General (2011–2018).

Berardinetti lost his seat in the 2018 provincial election, finishing third in the riding of Scarborough Southwest.

== Later life ==
In 2022, Berardinetti attempted to return to city politics, running for a seat on Toronto city council in the ward of Scarborough Southwest. He finished fourth in the election.

Shortly after his municipal defeat he suffered a seizure and was in a coma for a month. He could not find work after his 2018 defeat and was unable to work in the aftermath of his coma and depleted his savings as a result. He moved in with his brother in Ajax, Ontario in 2022 but left in 2023 after an argument over money and has lived in homeless shelters since then. In the summer of 2024, his neurologist gave him permission to work again and he is trying to establish a law practice. After news of his situation broke, he was able to raise over $25,000 from former colleagues across all parties, including his Progressive Conservative predecessor and New Democratic successor as MPP, Dan Newman and Doly Begum. It also led to suggestions that the MPP pension, removed in 1995 by Premier Mike Harris, be reinstated.

== Election results ==
2022 Toronto municipal election: Ward 20 Scarborough Southwest

Candidate	Vote	%
Gary Crawford	8,216	35.07
Parthi Kandavel	6,936	29.61
Kevin Rupasinghe	3,208	13.69
Lorenzo Berardinetti	2,773	11.84
Malik Ahmad	709	3.03
Corey David	615	2.63
Sharif Ahmed	608	2.60
Philip Mills	363	1.55

2018 Ontario general election: Scarborough Southwest
Party	Candidate	Votes	%	±%
New Democratic	Doly Begum	19,835	45.66	+22.09
Progressive Conservative	Gary Ellis	13,565	31.22	+10.25
Liberal	Lorenzo Berardinetti	8,228	18.94	–30.99
Green	David Del Grande	1,174	2.70	–1.36
None of the Above	Allen Atkinson	222	0.51	–
Libertarian	James Speirs	195	0.45	–
Special Needs	Willie Little	160	0.37	–
Trillium	Bobby Turley	64	0.15	–
Total valid votes		43,443	98.97	
Total rejected, unmarked and declined ballots		451	1.03	
Turnout		43,894	56.04	
Eligible voters		78,329		
New Democratic notional gain from Liberal		Swing		+26.54
Source: Elections Ontario

2014 Ontario general election
Party	Candidate	Votes	%	±%
Liberal	Lorenzo Berardinetti	18,420	50.22	+6.13
New Democratic	Jessie Macaulay	8,674	23.65	-7.80
Progressive Conservative	Nita Kang	7,570	20.64	-0.71
Green	David Del Grande	1,492	4.07	+1.72
Libertarian	Tyler Rose	328	0.89	
Independent	Jean-Baptiste Foaleng	192	0.52	
Total valid votes		36,676	100.0	
Liberal hold		Swing		+6.96
Source: Elections Ontario

2011 Ontario general election
Party	Candidate	Votes	%	±%
Liberal	Lorenzo Berardinetti	14,585	44.09	-2.06
New Democratic	Bruce Budd	10,404	31.45	+13.37
Progressive Conservative	Mike Chopowick	7,061	21.35	-4.19
Green	Robin McKim	777	2.35	-5.76
Freedom	Caroline Blanco-Ruibal	250	0.75	
Total valid votes		33,077	100.00	
Total rejected, unmarked and declined ballots		155	0.47	
Turnout		33,232	47.80	
Eligible voters		69,553		
Liberal hold		Swing		-7.72
Source: Elections Ontario

2007 Ontario general election
Party	Candidate	Votes	%	±%
Liberal	Lorenzo Berardinetti	15,113	46.15	-0.78
Progressive Conservative	Gary Crawford	8,363	25.54	-6.17
New Democratic	Jay Sarkar	5,920	18.08	+0.14
Green	Stefan Dixon	2,655	8.11	+6.26
Family Coalition	Wiktor Pawel Borkowski	398	1.22	-0.35
Libertarian	George Dance	296	0.90	
Total valid votes		32,745	100.00	
Elections Ontario.

2003 Ontario general election
Party	Candidate	Votes	%	±%
Liberal	Lorenzo Berardinetti	17,501	46.93	+13.27
Progressive Conservative	Dan Newman	11,826	31.71	-8.05
New Democratic	Barbara Warner	6,688	17.94	-5.28
Green	Andrew Strachan	689	1.85	+0.64
Family Coalition	Ray Scott	586	1.57	+0.29
Total valid votes		37,290	100.00	
Elections Ontario.

2000 Toronto municipal election

Ward 37 - Scarborough Centre

- Lorenzo Berardinetti - 11,007
- Colleen Mills - 3,203

1997 Toronto municipal election

Ward 15 – Scarborough City Centre (2 elected)
Brad Duguid – 15686
Lorenzo Berardinetti – 14179
Paul Mushinski – 9141
Betty Hackett – 4579
Russell Worrick – 3882
Ron Hartung – 743

1994 Scarborough municipal election

Ward 4

- Lorenzo Berardinetti - 5,551
- Georges Legault Sr - 1,193

1991 Scarborough municipal election

Ward 4

- Lorenzo Berardinetti - 3,762
- Kurt Christensen - 2,104
- Costas Manios - 1,367
- Ruth A. Lunel - 357

1988 Scarborough municipal election

Ward 4

- Lorenzo Berardinetti - 2,453
- Kurt Christensen - 2,449
- Glynwilliams - 1,936
- Ward - 1,011
- McDowell - 318
- Georges Legault - 292
