= Toronto municipal election =

Toronto municipal election may refer to elections held to elect the mayor and city councillors in the city of Toronto, Ontario, Canada. Notable elections include:

- 2026 Toronto municipal election
- 2022 Toronto municipal election
- 2018 Toronto municipal election
- 2018 Toronto municipal election (47-ward model)
- 2014 Toronto municipal election
- 2010 Toronto municipal election
- 2006 Toronto municipal election
- 2003 Toronto municipal election

- List of Toronto municipal elections – includes additional elections and historical context

== See also ==
- Municipal elections in Ontario
