= 2026 Toronto mayoral election =

Municipal election in Ontario, Canada

- October 26, 2026
- Opinion polls
- Turnout: 45.84% (▲7.34 pp)
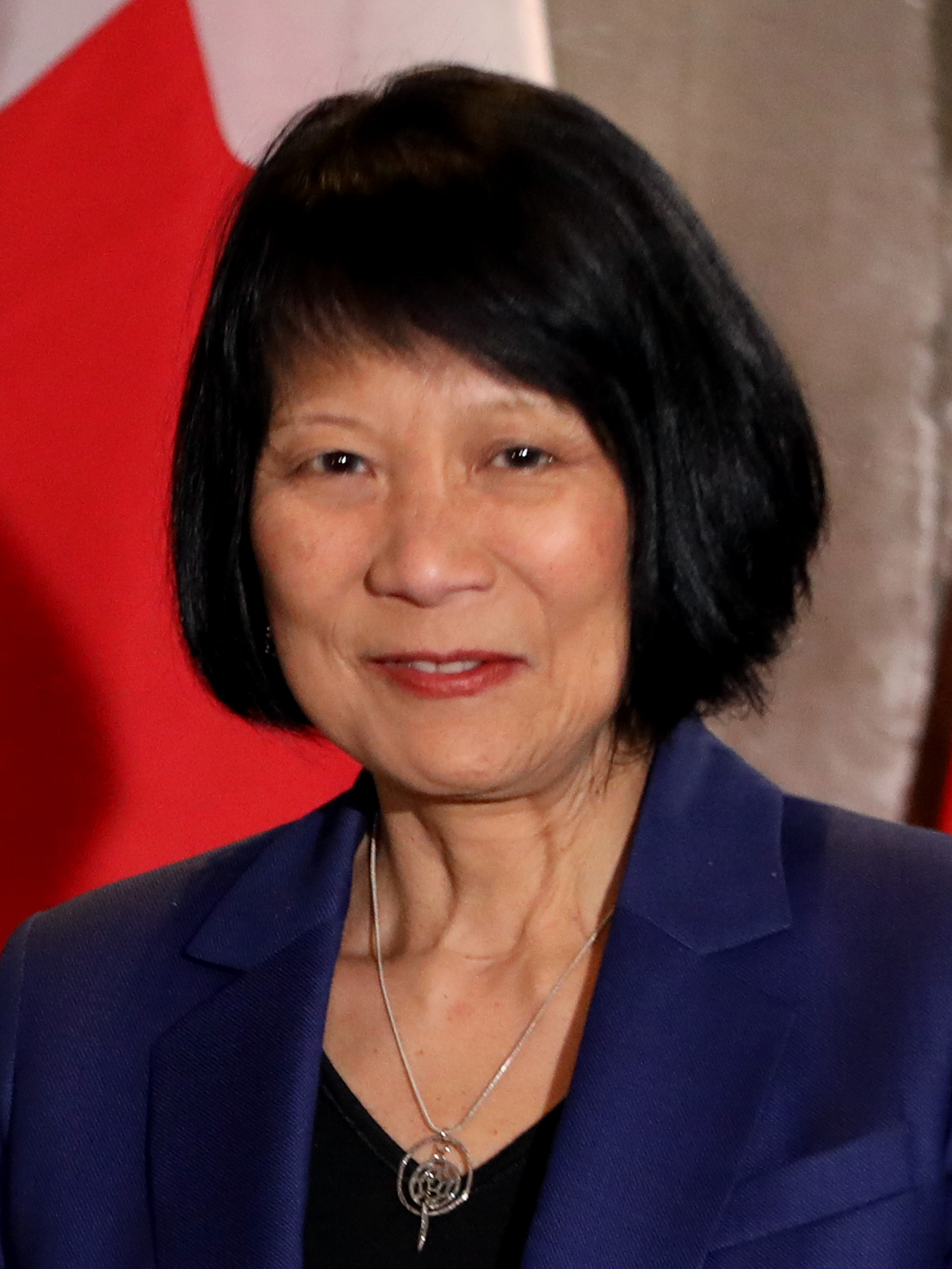

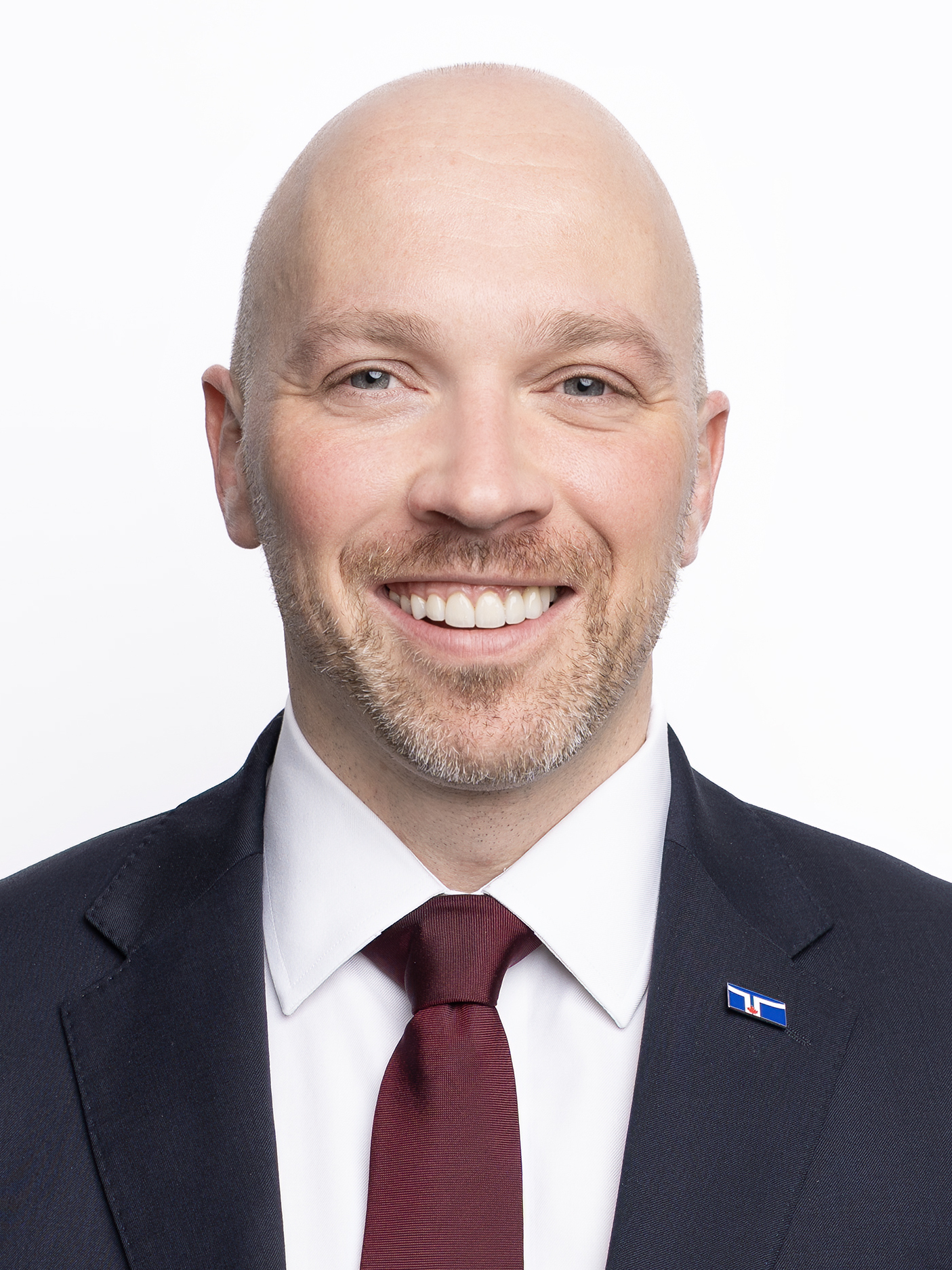
Candidate	Olivia Chow	Brad Bradford
Popular vote	532,201	404,013
Percentage	54.16%	41.11%
- Results by ward

- Results by polling subdivision
Mayor before election
Olivia Chow
Elected mayor
Olivia Chow

The 2026 Toronto mayoral election was held on October 26, 2026, to elect the mayor of the City of Toronto. The election took place alongside the 2026 Toronto municipal election, which elected city councillors and school board trustees.

Incumbent mayor Olivia Chow was re-elected to her first full term in a landslide. Chow was initially elected after winning a 2023 by-election triggered by the resignation of John Tory to complete the remainder of Tory’s term. Chow defeated her nearest rival city councillor Brad Bradford by 13 points. There were 53 candidates in total who ran for mayor.

This election saw the most votes received for a mayoral candidate in Canadian history, with Chow securing over 532,000 votes. The previous record was held by Mel Lastman at 483,277 votes in 2000.

== Mayoral debates ==
A number of mayoral debates took place during the campaign involving key contenders for the race.

Broadcast debates during the 2026 campaign
Date	Hosted by	Moderator	Participants		
Date	Hosted by	Moderator	Chow	Bradford	Alexander
September 14	Daily Bread Food Bank	Neil Hetherington	Y	Y	Y
September 22	Toronto Region Board of Trade and the Toronto Star	Nicole MacIntyre	Y	Y	Y
October 6	United Way Greater Toronto, Toronto Star, Toronto Metropolitan University	Edward Keenan	Y	Y	
October 7	Scarborough Community Renewal Organization	Cynthia Mulligan	Y	Y	
October 8	CBC Toronto	Chris Glover	Y	Y	
October 15	Rotman School of Management, TVO	Steve Paikin	Y	Y	
October 22	CP24, Crave	Michelle Dubé	Y	Y	

== Candidates ==
The nomination period for candidates opened on May 1, 2026, at 8:30 a.m. and closed on August 21, 2026, at 2 p.m. Fifty-five candidates were nominated, with two candidates withdrawing their candidacy prior to the election. Fifty-three candidates therefore ran for the office of mayor, two of whom publicly suspended their campaigns prior to election day. (Note: Announced end of campaign between the close of nominations and election day: Alexander on October 6; Parker (endorsing Olivia Chow) on October 21. The last date for candidates to officially withdraw was the nomination deadline of August 21; therefore any candidate that discontinued or became unable to continue their campaign after that date remained on the ballot.)

=== Major candidates ===
==== Olivia Chow ====
Incumbent mayor Olivia Chow announced her re-election bid on May 25, 2026. Previously a Toronto city councillor and New Democratic MP for Trinity—Spadina, Chow was first elected mayor in the 2023 Toronto mayoral by-election. Her campaign emphasized expanding tenant protections, maintaining TTC fare affordability and increasing services for seniors.

==== Brad Bradford ====
Brad Bradford, city councillor for Ward 19 Beaches—East York since 2018 and a former municipal urban planner, announced his intention to run on October 1, 2025. He had previously contested the 2023 mayoral by-election and registered for the 2026 election on May 1. His campaign proposals included increasing police staffing, freezing property taxes, reducing water bills, improving transit reliability and removing selected bicycle and bus lanes.

==== Chris Alexander ====
Chris Alexander registered on July 29, 2026. He had served as Canada's ambassador to Afghanistan from 2003 to 2005, Conservative MP for Ajax—Pickering from 2011 to 2015, and federal minister of citizenship and immigration from 2013 to 2015. Alexander ended his campaign on October 6, after the deadline for withdrawing, and consequently remained on the ballot.

=== Registered candidates ===
Registered candidates
Name	Nomination date	Description
Imad Abdulkadir	August 14, 2026	Multidisciplinary artist and musician performing under the name Mad.I.M. Involved with the community organization Campaign for Community. Campaigned on affordability, public transit safety and accessibility.
Bahira Abdulsalam	May 14, 2026	Professional engineer, college instructor and co-founder of an engineering company. 2023 mayoral by-election candidate and independent candidate in the 2025 provincial and federal elections in Don Valley West. Campaigned on community land trusts, expanding shelters and making the TTC free.
Chris Alexander	July 29, 2026	Former federal minister of Citizenship and Immigration (2013–2015), Canadian ambassador to Afghanistan (2003–2005), and Conservative MP for Ajax—Pickering (2011–2015).
Jamie Atkinson	July 7, 2026	Film company executive and 2023 mayoral by-election candidate. Proposed expanding Toronto's municipal boundaries to include several York Region municipalities, improving infrastructure and making Toronto a centre for artificial intelligence.
Brad Bradford	May 1, 2026	City councillor for Ward 19 Beaches—East York (2018–2026), former municipal urban planner and 2023 mayoral by-election candidate. Campaigned on increasing police staffing, freezing property taxes, reducing water bills, improving transit reliability and removing selected bicycle and bus lanes.
Darrell Brown	May 28, 2026	Lawyer, legal consultant and former CEO of the Canadian National Exhibition (2022–2025). Candidate in the 2025 Ward 25 Scarborough—Rouge Park council by-election. Campaigned on housing, homelessness, mental health services and expanding transit in Scarborough, including the proposed Eglinton East LRT.
Brian Buffey	August 14, 2026	Perennial candidate who previously ran for mayor in 2018 and in the 2023 mayoral by-election. Campaigned on ending municipal diversity programs, closing supervised consumption sites and expanding addiction treatment services.
Braeden Chow	May 21, 2026	Musician who performs under the name "nora". Proposed tax incentives for billionaires who donated to local charities and an augmented reality app awarding virtual currency for community service and academic achievement. His campaign consisted of a website domain and two AI-generated photographs. Experienced homelessness during much of the campaign following a dispute with his landlord. Initially claimed to be Olivia Chow's nephew, later admitted that was a "joke". Finished third with more than 8,000 votes; reportedly due to confusion among voters because he shared a surname with incumbent Olivia Chow.
Olivia Chow	May 25, 2026	Incumbent mayor of Toronto (2023–present), former New Democratic MP for Trinity—Spadina (2006–2014), Toronto city councillor (1992–2006) and school trustee. Campaigned on expanding tenant protections, maintaining TTC fare affordability and increasing services for seniors.
Logan Choy	August 17, 2026	Self-defence instructor and perennial candidate. Previously ran for mayor in 2018 and in the 2023 mayoral by-election, finishing ninth and eighteenth, respectively.
Kevin Clarke	August 20, 2026	Homelessness activist, founder and former leader of the People's Political Party, and perennial candidate running for mayor for the eighth time. Previously contested federal and provincial by-elections. Campaigned on municipal spending and changes to the city's approach to drug consumption.
Paul Collins	August 18, 2026	Author, freelance commercial director and 2023 mayoral by-election candidate. Campaigned on housing affordability, opposing TTC privatization and supporting the performing arts through tax incentives.
Roberto Curto	August 11, 2026	Urban planning professional and former constituency office intern for city councillor Anthony Perruzza. Campaigned on missing middle housing, mixed-use development, expanded transit hours and environmental policies.
Laura Dean	July 30, 2026	Municipal and land-use planning lawyer and former Ontario government policy advisor. Campaigned on affordable and supportive housing, expanded emergency shelter funding, youth employment and focusing police resources on violent crime.
Habiba Desai	August 21, 2026	Consultant and perennial candidate who previously contested the 2021 federal election, 2022 municipal election, 2023 mayoral by-election and 2024 Ward 15 Don Valley West council by-election. Advocated free school meals, housing rights and community benefits from development projects.
Cory Deville	May 1, 2026	Businessman and mayoral candidate in 2022 and 2023. Campaigned on reducing property taxes, extending TTC service hours, lowering weekend transit fares and increasing security and mental health staffing on transit.
Wincess Dorville	August 12, 2026	Self-employed financial educator and motivational speaker. Campaigned on permanent housing for homeless residents and expanded mental health and addiction recovery services.
Laura Ellis	May 1, 2026	Self-described organizational decision-making professional who campaigned on improving municipal decision-making and governance.
Martin Fraser	June 23, 2026	
Alton Frederick	August 14, 2026	Community activist and religious speaker who campaigned on reducing property taxes, public safety, rent affordability, transit improvements and youth mentorship.
Edward Gong	May 6, 2026	Businessman, owner of the Chinese-language television station Canada National Television and director of a company convicted of operating a pyramid scheme in 2021. Criminal charges against Gong were withdrawn, but his company forfeited substantial assets, and he agreed to a permanent securities trading ban in 2024. Previously contested the 2023 Toronto and 2024 Mississauga mayoral by-elections and ran as an independent in Don Valley North in the 2025 Canadian federal election. Campaigned on affordability, economic development and opposition to tax increases.
Faizan Haider	May 20, 2026	Entrepreneur and menswear professional. Campaigned on administrative reform, regional transit integration and a platform emphasizing unity, peace and equality.
Thomas Hall	July 22, 2026	2023 mayoral by-election candidate and candidate for city council in Ward 20 Scarborough Southwest in 2023.
Peter Handjis	May 1, 2026	Former business owner and film and television contractor. Perennial candidate who previously ran for mayor in 2022 and 2023, and for city council in the 2025 Ward 20 Scarborough Southwest by-election.
Jack Hartley	August 13, 2026	21-year-old candidate and energy industry intern who sought to become Toronto's youngest mayor. Campaigned on public safety, cleanliness, attracting young residents and unconventional proposals for highway expansion and municipal governance.
Heather He	May 1, 2026	Real estate broker and founder of an arts organization for seniors in York Region. 2023 mayoral by-election candidate who advocated public safety, clean air and the use of artificial intelligence.
Mohamad Kaaki	July 13, 2026	Architectural intern and community advocate who campaigned on housing affordability, urban design, fiscal responsibility and improved recognition of internationally trained professionals.
Georgios Kalkounis	June 22, 2026	Real estate sales representative who campaigned on freezing residential property taxes and TTC fares, reducing municipal spending and converting supervised consumption sites into youth employment and activity centres.
Isidoros Kyrlangitses	May 1, 2026	Candidate who proposed converting unsold condominium units into affordable housing, improving wayfinding at Union Station, expanding cultural events and reforming the municipal land transfer tax.
Michael Lamoureux	May 13, 2026	Accountant and finance professional with approximately 20 years of experience, and 2023 mayoral by-election candidate. Campaigned on municipal performance measures, referendums, free subway service funded through fees, and privatizing public housing in favour of rental vouchers.
Rick Lee	July 15, 2026	Senior program manager at Corus Entertainment and 2023 mayoral by-election candidate.
Reagan Levermany	August 21, 2026	
Eddie Mayanja	July 2, 2026	Former social worker for the government of Uganda.
Sarah McVie	May 1, 2026	Actress, playwright and cast member of the television series Workin' Moms. Organizer with the Black Creek Flood Coalition, which advocates improvements to flood protection infrastructure. Campaigned on municipal accountability, reducing bureaucracy, community involvement and supporting independent grocery cooperatives.
Francis Mercieca	August 21, 2026	
Joseph Osuji	July 17, 2026	
Odessa Paloma Parker	May 29, 2026	Writer, disc jockey and former editor of The Globe and Mail Style Magazine. Campaigned on installing platform screen doors on the Toronto subway, improving homeless shelters and temporary housing, and regulating data centre construction.
Gus Prokos	August 20, 2026	New Blue Party of Ontario candidate in Scarborough Centre in the 2025 Ontario general election.
Faisal Razi	July 31, 2026	
Amy Rosen	July 14, 2026	Novelist, cookbook author, entrepreneur, founder of Rosen's Cinnamon Buns and casting producer for Top Chef Canada. Campaigned on supporting small businesses, addressing antisemitism, improving municipal services, coordinating road closures, supporting the arts and planting 100,000 trees through a public-private partnership.
Lyall Sanders	May 1, 2026	Métis teacher, social activist, immigration consultancy entrepreneur and vice-president of the Centrist Party of Canada. 2023 mayoral by-election candidate and 2026 Scarborough Southwest federal by-election candidate. Campaigned on free public transit, affordable housing, tiny-home communities and reviewing municipal homelessness spending.
Naomi Sayers	May 28, 2026	Criminal defence lawyer and former escort from Garden River First Nation. Former independent candidate in Sault Ste. Marie in the 2022 Ontario general election after the Liberal Party rescinded her nomination. Campaigned on tenants' rights, gun violence prevention, community consultation and freezing increases to the police budget.
Robert Shusterman	May 15, 2026	Real estate agent, security guard and 2023 mayoral by-election candidate. Campaigned on road maintenance, affordable housing, accessible transit and increased services for seniors and people with mental illness.
Sandeep Srivastava	August 19, 2026	Business and technology consultant and perennial candidate who previously ran for city council in 2018 and mayor in 2022 and 2023. Campaigned on accelerating housing approvals, expanding environmentally sustainable transit and improving access to mental health and homelessness services.
Weizhen Tang	May 5, 2026	Former investment manager convicted of fraud in 2012 and permanently banned from Ontario capital markets. Previously ran for mayor in 2010 and 2023. Campaigned on municipal administrative reform, using artificial intelligence in city governance, housing development and changes to the shelter system.
Joshua Thompson	August 18, 2026	Comedian who campaigned on reducing municipal spending and taxes, addressing violent crime, increasing housing construction and restoring the name Yonge–Dundas Square to Sankofa Square.
Kuo Yu Tong	August 21, 2026	
Jeffery Tunney	June 29, 2026	Community advocate, author and 2023 mayoral by-election candidate. Campaigned on housing, youth employment, public safety, emergency preparedness and reducing taxes on workers and small businesses.
Jack Weenen	July 21, 2026	Perennial candidate who previously ran for mayor in 2018 and in the 2023 mayoral by-election.
Henoke Yohannes	August 21, 2026	
Leila Yohannes	July 31, 2026	Law student with interests in business and innovation.
Mostafa Zandkarimi	August 5, 2026	Student, founder and publisher of an online publication, and participant in the Canada Youth Changemakers Summit.

=== Withdrawn ===
- Renato Fallico — withdrew August 7, 2026
- Kannan S'ree Jr — withdrew August 19, 2026

=== Declined ===
- Ana Bailão, former deputy mayor of Toronto for Toronto and East York (2017–2022), city councillor for Ward 9 Davenport (2010–2022), 2023 mayoral by-election candidate, and CEO of Build Canada Homes (2025–present)
- Chloe Brown, policy analyst and activist, mayoral candidate in 2022 and 2023 (Ran for city council in Ward 1 Etobicoke North)
- Michael Ford, former Ontario minister of citizenship and multiculturalism (2022–2025), Progressive Conservative MPP for York South—Weston (2022–2025) and city councillor for Ward 1 Etobicoke North (2016–2022); nephew of Ontario premier Doug Ford and former Toronto mayor Rob Ford
- Anthony Furey, 2023 mayoral by-election candidate and the 2024 Ward 15 Don Valley West council by-election candidate
- Josh Matlow, city councillor for Ward 12 Toronto—St. Paul's (2010–present) and 2023 mayoral by-election candidate
- Marco Mendicino, former federal minister of public safety (2021–2023), Liberal MP for Eglinton—Lawrence (2015–2025), and chief of staff to prime minister Mark Carney (2025)
- Ben Mulroney, media personality, broadcaster and son of former prime minister Brian Mulroney (Endorsed Bradford)
- Rod Phillips, former Ontario minister of Finance (2019–2020) and Progressive Conservative MPP for Ajax (2018–2022)
- John Tory, 65th mayor of Toronto (2014–2023), leader of the Progressive Conservative Party of Ontario (2004–2009), leader of the Official Opposition in Ontario (2005–2007), and Progressive Conservative MPP for Dufferin—Peel—Wellington—Grey (2005–2007)

== Endorsements ==
Candidate	Current politicians	Former politicians	Organizations and individuals
Brad Bradford	City councillors: Vincent Crisanti, Ward 1 Etobicoke North; James Pasternak, Ward 6 York Centre; Members of Parliament (MPs): Scott Aitchison, Conservative, Parry Sound—Muskoka; Yvan Baker, Liberal, Etobicoke Centre; Leslie Church, Liberal, Toronto—St. Paul's; Ali Ehsassi, Liberal, Willowdale; Vince Gasparro, Liberal, Eglinton—Lawrence; James Maloney, Liberal, Etobicoke—Lakeshore; Jennifer McKelvie, Liberal, Ajax; former councillor; Judy Sgro, Liberal, Humber River—Black Creek; Members of Provincial Parliament (MPPs): Stephanie Smyth, Ontario Liberal, Toronto—St. Paul's	City councillors: John Campbell, Ward 4 Etobicoke Centre; Denzil Minnan-Wong, Ward 16 Don Valley East; Deputy Mayor; Case Ootes, Ward 29 Toronto—Danforth; Deputy Mayor; MPs: Peter Kent, Conservative, Thornhill; John McKay, Liberal, Scarborough—Guildwood; Erin O'Toole, Conservative, Durham; Leader of the Conservative Party; Lisa Raitt, Conservative, Milton; MPPs: Tim Hudak, Niagara West—Glanbrook; Leader of the Ontario Progressive Conservative Party; provincial Opposition Leader; Brad Duguid, Ontario Liberal, Scarborough Centre	Conrad Black, founder of the National Post; Geddy Lee, musician (Rush); Ben Mulroney, broadcaster; ABC Toronto, advocacy group
Olivia Chow	City councillors: Alejandra Bravo, Ward 9 Davenport; Chair of Economic and Community Development; Paula Fletcher, Ward 14 Toronto—Danforth, Deputy Speaker; Ausma Malik, Ward 10 Spadina—Fort York; Statutory Deputy Mayor; Nick Mantas, Ward 22 Scarborough—Agincourt; Chris Moise, Ward 13 Toronto Centre; Chair of the Board of Health; Amber Morley, Ward 3 Etobicoke—Lakeshore; Deputy Mayor for Etobicoke and York; Gord Perks, Ward 4 Parkdale—High Park; Chair of Planning and Housing; Anthony Perruzza, Ward 7 Humber River—Black Creek; MPs: Gary Anandasangaree, Liberal, Scarborough—Guildwood—Rouge Park; Minister of Public Safety; Doly Begum, Liberal, Scarborough Southwest; Don Davies, New Democratic, Vancouver Kingsway; Heather McPherson, New Democratic, Edmonton Strathcona; Rob Oliphant, Liberal, Don Valley West; Jean Yip, Liberal, Scarborough—Agincourt; Salma Zahid, Liberal, Scarborough Centre—Don Valley East; MPPs: Chris Glover, Ontario New Democratic, Spadina—Fort York; Mary-Margaret McMahon, Ontario Liberal, Beaches—East York; Marit Stiles, Leader of the Ontario New Democratic Party; Davenport; provincial Opposition Leader; Peter Tabuns, Ontario New Democratic, Toronto—Danforth; Kristyn Wong-Tam, Ontario New Democratic, Toronto Centre; Other: Avi Lewis, Leader of the New Democratic Party of Canada	City councillors: Mike Layton, Ward 11 University—Rosedale; MPs: Nate Erskine-Smith, Liberal, Beaches—East York; Minister of Housing, Infrastructure and Communities; MPPs: Kathleen Wynne, Don Valley West; Leader of the Ontario Liberal Party; 25th Premier of Ontario; Various roles: Bob Rae, 21st Premier of Ontario; MPP York South, Broadview—Greenwood; Leader of the Ontario New Democratic Party; MP Toronto Centre; interim Leader of the Liberal Party of Canada; 25th Canadian Ambassador to the United Nations	Labour: Canadian Union of Public Employees (CUPE) Local 79; Laborers' International Union of North America (LiUNA) Local 183; Toronto and York Region Labour Council; Amalgamated Transit Union (ATU) Local 113; Canadian Union of Public Employees (CUPE) Local 416; Others: Randell Adjei, Poet Laureate of Ontario; Jim Cuddy, singer-songwriter (Blue Rodeo); DijahSB, rapper; Feist, singer-songwriter; Sarah Polley, filmmaker and actor; David Suzuki, environmentalist and broadcaster; Flavio Volpe, Automotive Parts Manufacturer's Association president; Progress Toronto, advocacy group

== Polling ==
=== Graphical summary ===
Campaign period polling. Polls are plotted at midpoint of polling dates, with bars representing reported margin of error. Lines are a LOESS trend with an adaptive window.

=== Campaign period ===
Polling firm	Method	Polling dates	Sample size	MOE	Brad Bradford	Olivia Chow	Chris Alexander	Other (Note: Including undeclared candidates and "undecided")	Lead
Election result	—	October 26, 2026	982,660	—	41.1%	54.2%	0.4%	4.4%	13.1
Forum Research	IVR	October 25, 2026	1,006	± 4.0%	43%	53%	—N/a	4%	10
Liaison Strategies	IVR	October 24–25, 2026	750	± 3.6%	44%	52%	—N/a	4%	8
Pallas Data	IVR	October 24, 2026	608	± 4%	43%	53%	—N/a	4%	10
Mainstreet Research	IVR	October 22–24, 2026	993	± 3.1%	45%	51%	—N/a	4%	6
Pollara Strategic Insights	Telephone/online	October 16–24, 2026	1,505	± 2.5%	45%	54%	—N/a	2%	9
Canada Pulse Insights	Online	October 16–21, 2026	737	± 3.6%	46%	51%	—N/a	3%	5
Liaison Strategies	IVR	October 18–19, 2026	1000	± 3.1%	49%	47%	—N/a	3%	2
Pollara Strategic Insights	Telephone/online	October 13–19, 2026	1,099	± 3.0%	46%	53%	—N/a	2%	7
Mainstreet Research	IVR	October 16–18, 2026	1,000	± 3.1%	49%	48%	—N/a	4%	1
Nanos Research	Telephone/online	October 15–18, 2026	762	± 3.6%	47%	50%	—N/a	4%	3
Pallas Data	IVR	October 14, 2026	732	± 3.6%	46%	52%	—N/a	3%	6
Nanos Research	Telephone/online	October 8–10, 2026	757	± 3.6%	47%	51%	—N/a	2%	4
Liaison Strategies	IVR	October 8–9, 2026	1000	± 3.1%	46%	51%	—N/a	3%	5
Mainstreet Research	IVR/Online	October 6–7, 2026	1,000	± 3.1%	44%	47%	—N/a	9%	3
Scope Research (Note: Poll was reported with undecided respondents included. Figures shown are share among decided voters.)	Online	October 6, 2026	3100	± 2%	47%	51%	—N/a	3%	4
Forum Research	IVR	October 6, 2026	1604	± 2.45%	42%	46%	—N/a	12%	4
	6 October 2026	Chris Alexander suspends his campaign							
Liaison Strategies	IVR	October 3–4, 2026	1000	± 3.1%	40%	48%	9%	3%	8
Nanos Research	Telephone/online	September 30–October 4, 2026	755	± 3.6%	43%	52%	4%	1%	9
Mainstreet Research	IVR/Online	September 28–29, 2026	850	± 3.1%	38%	45%	9%	8%	7
Liaison Strategies	IVR	September 26–27, 2026	1000	± 3.1%	39%	48%	10%	3%	9
Canada Pulse Insights	Online	September 14–24, 2026	510	± 4.3%	34%	51%	9%	6%	17
Forum Research	IVR	September 23, 2026	1014	± 4.0%	35%	46%	6%	13%	11
Liaison Strategies	IVR	September 19–20, 2026	1000	± 3.1%	40%	47%	10%	3%	7
Mainstreet Research	IVR/Online	September 14–17, 2026	836	± 3.1%	38%	46%	10%	7%	8
Ipsos	Online	September 4–8, 2026	1006	± 3.8%	31%	54%	6%	7%	23
Liaison Strategies	IVR	September 4–5, 2026	1000	± 3.1%	39%	50%	10%	2%	11
Pallas Data	IVR	August 19–21, 2026	808	± 3.4%	39%	50%	8%	3%	11
Liaison Strategies	IVR	August 14–16, 2026	1000	± 3.1%	38%	49%	11%	3%	11
Liaison Strategies	IVR	August 4–5, 2026	1000	± 3.1%	40%	47%	10%	3%	7
Forum Research	IVR	July 29, 2026	1011	± 4.0%	32%	47%	11%	10%	15
	29 July 2026	Chris Alexander registers as a candidate							
Liaison Strategies	IVR	July 24–26, 2026	1000	± 3.1%	41%	49%	—N/a	10%	8
Liaison Strategies	IVR	June 28–30, 2026	1000	± 3.1%	40%	49%	—N/a	11%	9
Mainstreet Research	IVR/Online	June 12–18, 2026	1157	± 2.9%	38%	44%	—N/a	19%	6
Liaison Strategies	IVR	May 10–11, 2026	1000	± 3.1%	37%	50%	—N/a	13%	13

=== Prior to campaign period ===
Polling firm	Method	Final date of poll	Sample size	MOE	Ana Bailão	Brad Bradford	Olivia Chow	Anthony Furey	Michael Ford	Marco Mendicino	John Tory	Other	Lead
	20 April 2026	Anthony Furey declines to run											
Liaison Strategies	IVR	13 April 2026	1000	± 3.1%	—N/a	35%	46%	11%	—N/a	—N/a	—N/a	8%	11
	2 April 2026	Michael Ford declines to run											
Liaison Strategies	IVR	8 March 2026	1000	± 3.1%	—N/a	26%	44%	8%	16%	—N/a	—N/a	6%	18
Pallas Data	IVR	8 March 2026	735	± 3.6%	—N/a	26%	44%	—N/a	21%	—N/a	—N/a	8%	18
	3 March 2026	John Tory declines to run											
Mainstreet Research	IVR	22 February 2026	802	± 3.5%	—N/a	17%	43%	6%	—N/a	—N/a	34%	—N/a	9
Liaison Strategies	IVR	2 February 2026	1000	± 3.1%	—N/a	18%	40%	5%	—N/a	—N/a	33%	4%	7
Liaison Strategies	IVR	21 December 2025	1000	± 3.1%	—N/a	16%	39%	6%	—N/a	—N/a	35%	4%	4
Liaison Strategies	IVR	23 October 2025	1000	± 3.1%	—N/a	12%	42%	7%	—N/a	—N/a	36%	3%	6
Canada Pulse Insights/CityNews	IVR	6 October 2025	406	± 4.9%	—N/a	8%	29%	2%	—N/a	—N/a	24%	33%	5
	1 October 2025	Brad Bradford declares his candidacy											
Forum Research	IVR	4 September 2025	1000	± 4%	8%	18%	36%	—N/a	—N/a	—N/a	30%	13%	6
Ipsos	Online	29 August 2025	1001	± 3.8%	—N/a	—N/a	33%	—N/a	—N/a	—N/a	25%	31%	8
Liaison Strategies	IVR	6 July 2025	1000	± 3.1%	7%	8%	39%	6%	—N/a	3%	35%	—N/a	4
Pallas Data	IVR	7 June 2025	611	± 4%	—N/a	14%	37%	—N/a	—N/a	11%	24%	15%	13

== Results ==
The City Clerk certified the election results on October 29, 2026. Olivia Chow was re-elected with 532,201 votes (54.16%), defeating Brad Bradford, who received 404,013 votes (41.11%), by a margin of 128,188 votes.

Musician Braeden Chow, who is unrelated to Olivia Chow, finished third with 8,102 votes (0.82%), more than twice the total received by fourth-place candidate Chris Alexander. During advance voting, held from October 6 to 11, voters raised concerns about possible confusion because Braeden Chow's name appeared immediately above Olivia Chow's on the ballot, with given names printed in smaller type to the left of surnames. Olivia Chow's campaign subsequently promoted her position as the ninth candidate on the ballot. Braeden Chow said he had not intended to draw votes away from the incumbent and denied being paid by Bradford's campaign.

=== Total ===
2026 Toronto mayoral election
Candidate	Votes	%
Olivia Chow (incumbent)	532,201	54.16
Brad Bradford	404,013	41.11
Braeden Chow	8,102	0.82
Chris Alexander	3,550	0.36
Edward Gong	3,443	0.35
Laura Dean	2,224	0.23
Darrell Brown	2,077	0.21
Imad Abdulkadir	1,873	0.19
Bahira Abdulsalam	1,696	0.17
Rick Lee	1,288	0.13
Logan Choy	1,282	0.13
Sandeep Srivastava	1,149	0.12
Kevin Clarke	1,089	0.11
Georgios Kalkounis	1,085	0.11
Roberto Curto	959	0.10
Sarah McVie	957	0.10
Jamie Atkinson	932	0.09
Amy Rosen	919	0.09
Paul Collins	845	0.09
Lyall Sanders	784	0.08
Mohamad Kaaki	727	0.07
Joshua Thompson	709	0.07
Brian Buffey	649	0.07
Laura Ellis	630	0.06
Michael Lamoureux	570	0.06
Robert Shusterman	522	0.05
Cory Deville	485	0.05
Odessa Paloma Parker	457	0.05
Martin Fraser	437	0.04
Alton Frederick	432	0.04
Heather He	421	0.04
Mostafa Zandkarimi	396	0.04
Faizan Haider	370	0.04
Alex Cruze	366	0.04
Kuo Yu Tong	366	0.04
Habiba Desai	364	0.04
Weizhen Tang	354	0.04
Francis Mercieca	352	0.04
Thomas Hall	341	0.03
Faisal Razi	337	0.03
Gus Prokos	327	0.03
Jack Hartley	322	0.03
Joseph Osuji	320	0.03
Naomi Sayers	274	0.03
Peter Handjis	270	0.03
Isidoros Kyrlangitses	256	0.03
Leila Yohannes	206	0.02
Reagan Levermany	202	0.02
Eddie Mayanja	193	0.02
Wincess Dorville	175	0.02
Henoke Yohannes	157	0.02
Jeffery Tunney	133	0.01
Jack Weenen	72	0.01
Total valid votes	982,660	100.00

A total of 989,990 ballots were cast across the municipal election. The City stated that final voter statistics, including the revised number of eligible voters, would be published within 30 days of the election.

=== By ward ===
Chow led in 19 wards and Bradford in six. Chow received her highest share of the vote in Ward 13 Toronto Centre, with 72.4%, while Bradford received his highest share in Ward 6 York Centre, with 64.2%. Other candidates collectively received their highest share in Ward 1 Etobicoke North, with 10.0%.

Mayoral vote shares by ward
Ward			Others
Ward	Chow	Bradford	Others
City-wide	54.16%	41.11%	4.73%
1 Etobicoke North	45.4%	44.6%	10.0%
2 Etobicoke Centre	37.0%	59.0%	4.0%
3 Etobicoke—Lakeshore	47.1%	49.3%	3.5%
4 Parkdale—High Park	69.0%	27.1%	3.9%
5 York South—Weston	48.8%	43.9%	7.3%
6 York Centre	31.6%	64.2%	4.3%
7 Humber River—Black Creek	49.7%	40.7%	9.5%
8 Eglinton—Lawrence	34.2%	62.7%	3.0%
9 Davenport	69.0%	27.6%	3.4%
10 Spadina—Fort York	67.0%	30.2%	2.8%
11 University—Rosedale	63.4%	33.9%	2.7%
12 Toronto—St. Paul's	51.1%	46.0%	2.9%
13 Toronto Centre	72.4%	23.4%	4.2%
14 Toronto—Danforth	71.1%	25.2%	3.7%
15 Don Valley West	46.1%	50.6%	3.3%
16 Don Valley East	53.3%	41.4%	5.3%
17 Don Valley North	47.7%	47.0%	5.2%
18 Willowdale	45.4%	50.4%	4.3%
19 Beaches—East York	65.4%	31.0%	3.6%
20 Scarborough Southwest	54.9%	39.7%	5.4%
21 Scarborough Centre	51.9%	41.2%	6.9%
22 Scarborough—Agincourt	52.9%	40.1%	7.0%
23 Scarborough North	56.7%	34.5%	8.7%
24 Scarborough—Guildwood	53.5%	39.7%	6.8%
25 Scarborough—Rouge Park	50.8%	42.9%	6.3%

== Student vote ==
A symbolic vote among elementary, middle, and secondary school students was organized by the non-profit organization Civix Canada.

2026 Toronto mayoral election — Student vote result (top 5)

Mayoral Candidate	Vote	Share	2026 diff.
Olivia Chow	16,250	46.24%	–7.92
Brad Bradford	10,199	29.02%	–12.09
Edward Gong	2,206	6.28%	+5.92
Lyall Sanders	510	1.45%	+1.37
Rick Lee	436	1.25%	+1.12
