= Janet Davies =

Janet Davies may refer to:

- Janet Davies (actress) (1927–1986), English actress
- Janet Davies (politician) (born 1939), Plaid Cymru Welsh politician
- Janet Davies, WLS-TV reporter featured in the James Bond short story "Live at Five"

== See also ==
- Jan Davis (born 1953), former American astronaut
- Jan Davis (died 1999), stuntwoman who died BASE jumping from El Capitan
- Janet Davis, former city councillor in Toronto, Ontario, Canada
- Jennet Device, a key witness in 18–19 August 1612 trial of the Lancaster Assizes
- Janet Davis (sprinter), winner of the 1987 NCAA 4 × 100 m championships
