= Janet Davis =

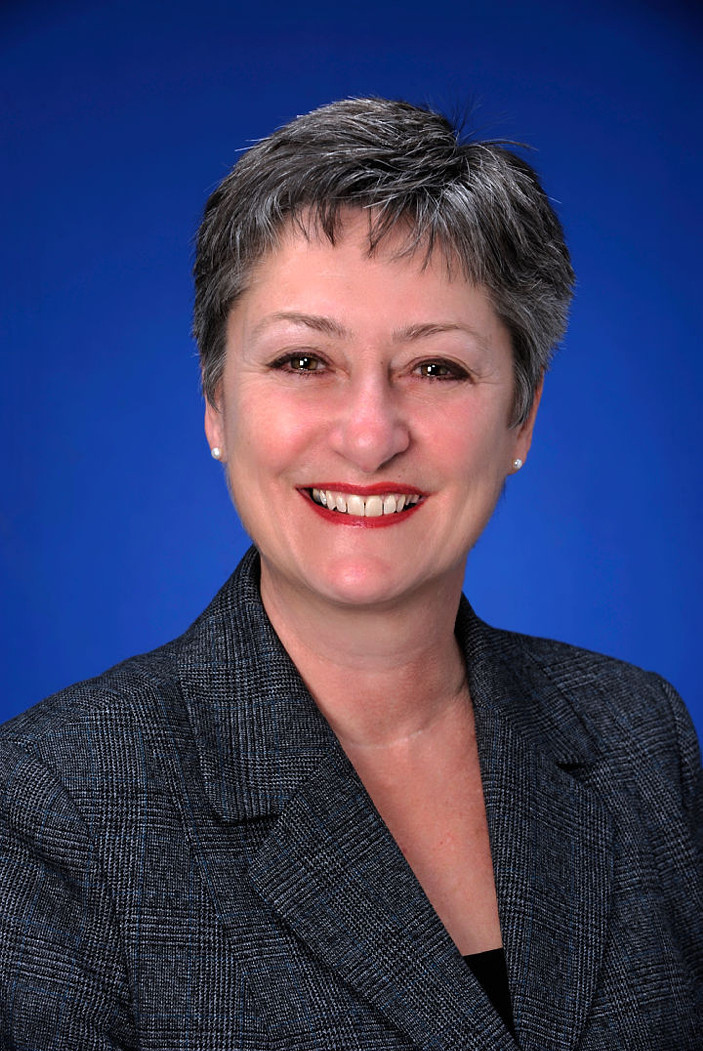
- Davis in 2010

Toronto City Councillor for (Ward 31) Beaches-East York
- In office December 1, 2003 – December 1, 2018
- Preceded by: Michael Tziretas
- Succeeded by: Brad Bradford

Chair of the Toronto and East York Community Council
- In office June 27, 2005 – December 1, 2008
- Preceded by: Kyle Rae
- Succeeded by: Pam McConnell

Personal details
- Spouse: Mel Rotman
- Children: 2
- Occupation: Public Administrator

Janet Davis is a former city councillor in Toronto, Ontario, Canada. She represented Ward 31 Beaches-East York (now Ward 19), the northern portion of Beaches—East York, from 2003 to 2018. She is well known for her work on affordable day care and preserving public pools in the city.

Before her election to Council she served as president of the Ontario Coalition for Better Child Care, she also spent fifteen years developing child care at the Toronto District School Board and also served as senior policy advisor to the Minister of Education.

On June 13, 2018, Davis announced that she was not running for another term in the October 2018 municipal election after 15 years in office.

== Election results ==
2010 Toronto election, Ward 31
Candidate	Votes	%
Janet Davis	11,177	63.272%
Robert Walker	1,945	11.01%
Peter Agaliotis	1,468	8.31%
Brenda MacDonald	1,412	7.993%
Rasal Rahman	1,065	6.029%
Donna Braniff	505	2.859%
Leonard Subotich	93	0.526%
Total	17,665	100%
