= Naomi Sayers =

Canadian lawyer and Indigenous rights advocate

Naomi Sayers (born c. 1986) is a Canadian lawyer, Indigenous rights advocate and former political candidate. A member of Garden River First Nation in Ontario, she is known for her advocacy on Indigenous issues and sex workers' rights.

== Career ==
Sayers previously worked as a sex worker before pursuing a legal career. She has publicly discussed her experiences and advocated for changes to Canadian laws governing sex work. In 2020, she established a law practice in the Algoma District of Ontario.

== Political activities ==
In the 2022 Ontario general election, Sayers ran as an independent candidate in the electoral district of Sault Ste. Marie, following an unsuccessful attempt to obtain the Ontario Liberal Party nomination. She finished fourth of six candidates, receiving 1,070 votes (3.98%).

Sayers subsequently ran in the 2026 Toronto mayoral election. Her campaign proposed balancing the interests of landlords and tenants, establishing an "Office of Community Voice" to increase public participation in municipal government, and providing support for victims of gun violence and crime. She finished 44th of 53 candidates with 274 votes (0.03%).

== Legal proceedings ==
In October 2026, the Toronto Star reported that Sayers had been charged with attempting to obstruct justice in connection with the kidnapping of cryptocurrency investor Aiden Pleterski. Prosecutors alleged that Sayers and Akil Heywood, who was separately accused of involvement in the kidnapping, attempted to persuade convicted kidnapper Deren Akyeam-Pong to change an agreed statement of facts from his guilty plea. Akyeam-Pong alleged in a sworn affidavit that Sayers had visited him in jail three times and urged him to sign a revised statement. Sayers declined to comment on the allegations in detail, citing outstanding disclosure and her efforts to obtain legal counsel, and cautioned against drawing conclusions before all the facts were known.
