= Brad Bradford =

Canadian politician (born 1986)

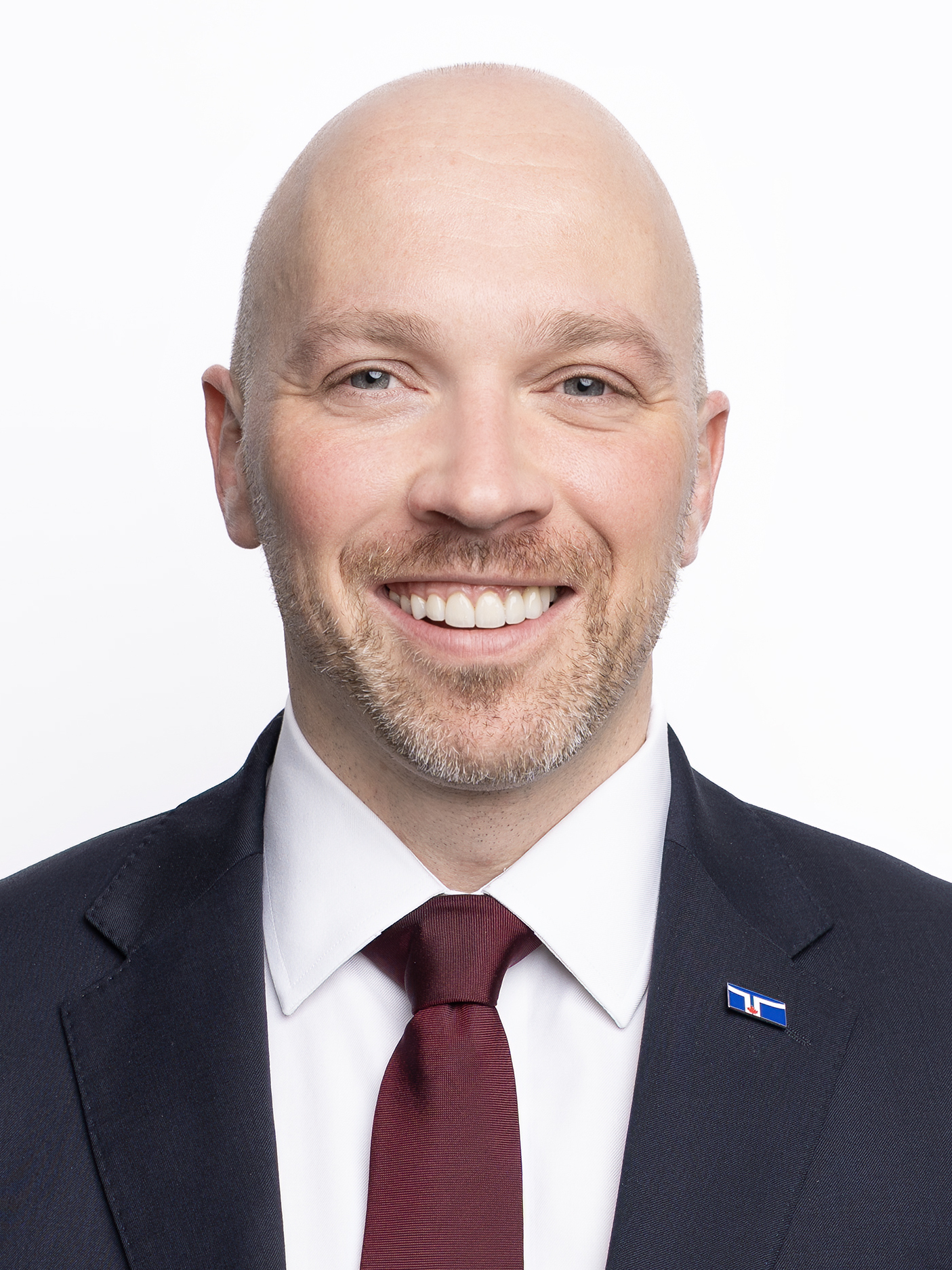
- Bradford in 2026

Toronto City Councillor for Ward 19 Beaches—East York
- In office December 1, 2018 – November 15, 2026
- Preceded by: Ward established
- Succeeded by: Nate Erskine-Smith

Personal details
- Born: Bradford MacDonald Leckie; August 1, 1986 (age 40) Ancaster, Ontario, Canada
- Spouse: Kathryn Randle
- Children: 2
- Parent: Valerie Bradford (mother)
- Education: York University (BES, 2009); University of Waterloo (MA, 2012)
- Occupation: Politician; urban planner
- Website: bradford26.ca

Bradford MacDonald Bradford (né Leckie; born August 1, 1986) is a Canadian politician and former urban planner who represented Ward 19 Beaches—East York on Toronto City Council from 2018 to 2026. Bradford placed second in the 2026 Toronto mayoral election, behind incumbent Olivia Chow; he previously contested the 2023 mayoral by-election, placing eighth.

== Early life, education, and career ==
Bradford was born to Valerie Bradford and Brian Leckie and grew up in Ancaster, Ontario. He was given the name Bradford to continue Valerie's family name (as her father and uncle had five daughters combined and no sons), along with her spouse's last name, Leckie. When he was seven, his parents separated and his mother raised her three children as a single mother and reverted to using her original surname. Deciding he wanted to use his mother's surname, Brad adopted his present surname.

Bradford has since credited his background as a high-level competitive figure skater for giving him his drive and "coachable" nature in his municipal political career.

Bradford holds a Bachelor of Environmental Studies (BES), in urban and regional environments from York University, and a Master of Arts (MA) in urban planning from the University of Waterloo.

After leaving school, Bradford was a planning consultant and worked in stakeholder engagement and special projects at the City of Toronto in chief planner Jennifer Keesmaat's office.

Bradford and Keesmaat have had a public falling out, with Keesmaat questioning his integrity.

== Political career ==
=== Toronto City Councillor ===
Bradford was elected to Toronto City Council in the 2018 municipal election, representing Ward 19 Beaches—East York. He was re-elected in the 2022 municipal election, and placed eighth in the 2023 by-election for mayor, which was won by Olivia Chow.

Following the 2022 election, Bradford was appointed as the chair of the planning and housing committee. Following the election of Mayor Chow, Bradford was named vice-chair. On December 16, 2024, the mayor shuffled her committee appointments, and Bradford was replaced as vice-chair by Frances Nunziata. Despite the shuffle, Chow stated that "Councillor Bradford is an important voice in housing at the City and will continue his work on the Planning and Housing Committee". Bradford described the move as "politics at its worst."

On October 1, 2025, Bradford announced that he would run for mayor in the 2026 mayoral election and did not seek re-election as councillor. He was succeeded as councillor by Nate Erskine-Smith.

=== Views ===
==== Police funding ====
In June 2020, amid the Black Lives Matter movement, Bradford supported an unsuccessful motion calling for a 10 per cent budget cut, amounting to $122 million, from the Toronto Police Service. In an article on his website explaining his vote, Bradford wrote that while he is "not interested in the politics of alienating police", he is "equally uninterested in maintaining the status quo of policies and funding models perpetuating racism and leaving communities under-resourced."

During the 2023 budget debate, the proposed TPS budget included a $48.3 million increase. Councillor Alejandra Bravo moved a motion to transfer $900,000 from the proposed increase to operating more warming spaces. Bradford questioned if the motion was meant to "defund the police".

During Bradford's 2026 campaign for mayor, he proposed hiring 1,000 new police officers. Councillor Shelley Caroll, the chair of the Budget Committee and the Toronto Police Service Board, estimated that the proposal would cost "well over $100 million".

==== Renaming Dundas ====
Bradford voted to rename Dundas Street, as well as related city properties including Yonge-Dundas Square, a public library branch and two subway stations when it was first proposed in July 2021. The proposal was also endorsed by Mayor John Tory and was estimated to cost the city $6 million to implement. In his remarks on the item, Bradford questioned if it "makes sense to name streets and plazas and transit stations after someone with a disputed, controversial and problematic past", stating that he viewed the answer as "pretty clearly no", adding that he did not feel a need to delay, and that the renaming would be a step towards confronting systemic racism. As estimated costs for the original initiative grew to $13 million, Bradford voted for a new plan in presented to council in December 2023, which was also endorsed by Mayor Chow, to defer renaming the street and only move ahead with the square, two subway stations and a library branch at a cost of $2.7 million.

In June 2024, Bradford indicated that he was concerned about the rising costs of the initiative and believed the project should be paused, stating in an interview with CBC News that "the city is broke and this is something the vast majority of Torontonians weren't asking for." He later introduced an unsuccessful motion aimed at blocking the renaming of the square by redirecting the funding towards accessibility and safety improvements. During his 2026 mayoral campaign, Bradford proposed again renaming the square. He released a plan which would change the name to "Toronto Square" and establish a police sub-station in the square as part of efforts to "clean up" the square.

==== Bike lanes ====
In 2020, Bradford wrote an op-ed in Spacing titled: Bike lanes are the path to main street recovery on the Danforth and across the city. In his article, Bradford argues that bike lanes are critical to economic development, particularly in the context of the COVID-19 pandemic. Bradford praises the approval of 40 kilometres of bike lanes across the city including on Danforth Avenue in his ward, and notes the importance of active transportation infrastructure in not only recovery from the pandemic, but also "our long term physical and mental health, and the health of our environment."

Bradford supported a council motion in June 2023 to expand the cycling network, including by extending the Bloor Street bike lanes from Runnymede Road to Resurrection Road.

During his 2026 campaign for mayor, he committed to removing the section of bike lanes from Runnymede Road to Resurrection Road and replacing them with new bike lanes on residential roads and in parks. Acknowledging that he previously voted to install the section of bike lane, he said he voted in support "when they were plans on paper, and that was done with the very best of intentions." But that it "became clear that council, including me, got this one wrong."

=== Campaigns ===
==== 2018 election ====
During the 2018 municipal election campaign, Bradford received endorsements from Mayor John Tory, Deputy Mayor Ana Bailão, former Liberal member of Provincial Parliament (MPP) Arthur Potts, Councillor Mary-Margaret McMahon (the previous incumbent of ward 32, which made up a part of the current ward boundaries), and former Toronto chief planner and mayoral candidate Jennifer Keesmaat.

Bradford defeated candidate Matthew Kellway, who represented Beaches—East York federally from 2011 to 2015 as the New Democratic MP.

==== 2022 election ====
Bradford campaigned on the need for affordable housing, to improve parks, improving transportation, and reducing crime in the 2022 election. He ran against five other candidates and was endorsed by Mayor John Tory.

==== 2023 mayoral by-election ====
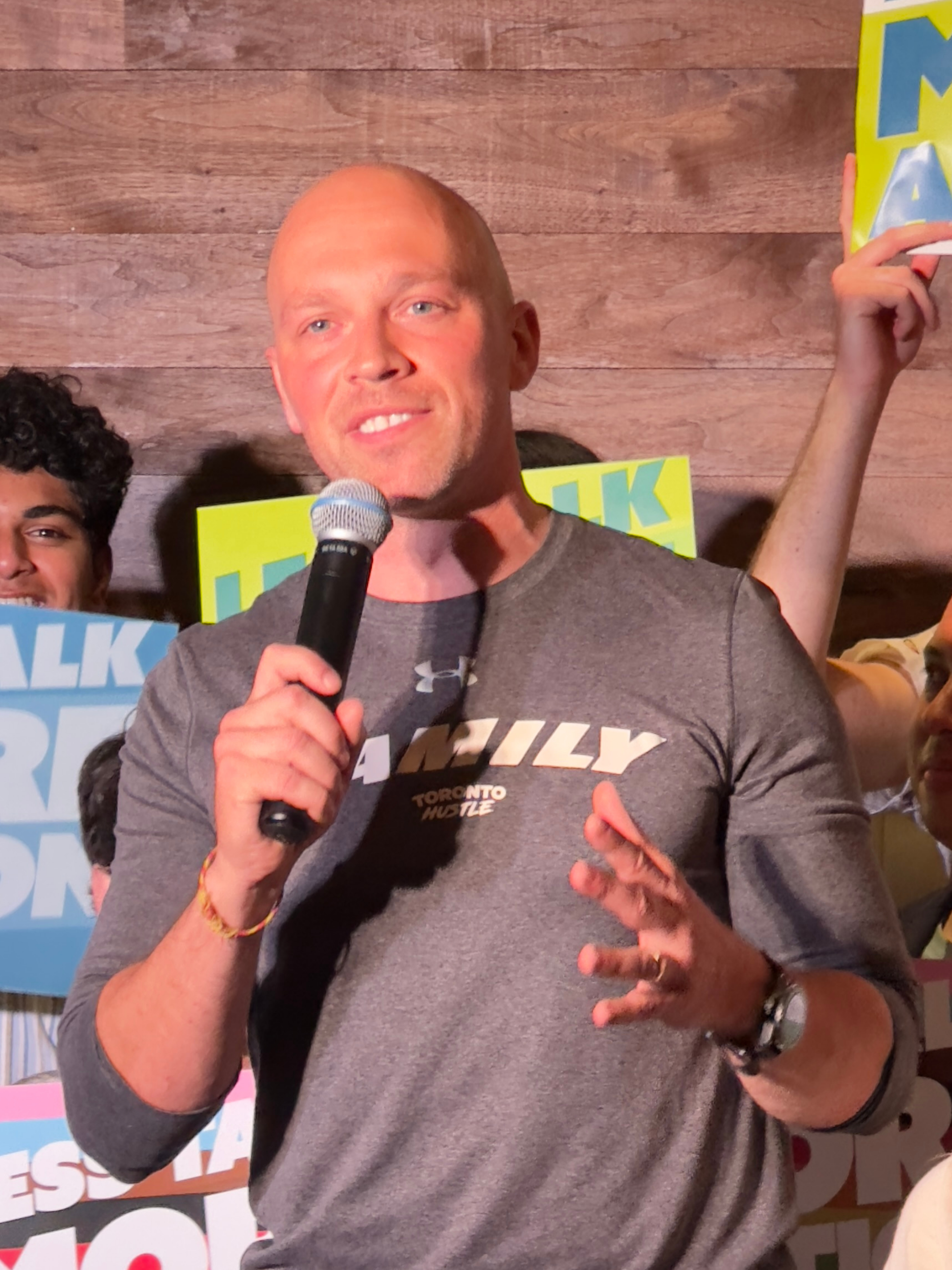
Bradford at a campaign event in 2023

Following the resignation of Mayor Tory in February 2023, Bradford formed an advisory committee to explore a run for mayor of Toronto.

He was advised by Liberals Khokon Abbas, a consultant, former candidate Andrea Barrack and campaign strategist Bob Lopinski, as well as Progressive Conservatives Dennis Matthews and Kory Teneycke, who worked on Premier Doug Ford's campaign team. Bradford hired Matt Hiraishi, who previously worked as chief of staff and former campaign manager to Ontario education minister Stephen Lecce, as his campaign manager.

One of the first platform items he released was a plan to increase public safety on the Toronto Transit Commission (TTC). He proposed establishing a new agency to respond to mental health crises, expanding cell phone service throughout the subway system, hire an additional 40 special constables and 50 police officers to patrol the TTC and, and retrofit subway stations to include platform doors.

Bradford proposed redeploying 200 parking enforcement officers at 50 intersections during rush hour, and create a new office to coordinate construction and maintenance projects.

Shortly after he indicated he was considering a run for mayor, a postering campaign describing him as "two-faced Brad" began to circulate in his ward.

He lost the election to Olivia Chow, coming in eighth place with 9,254 votes (1.28%).

==== Integrity commissioner investigation ====
In April and May 2023, Bradford's campaign sent out mass emails announcing the opening of a campaign office and criticizing Olivia Chow. Four constituents subsequently submitted complaints to the integrity commissioner; while they had previously contacted Bradford in his capacity as councillor, they did not sign up to receive campaign communications.

In July 2024, Integrity Commissioner Jonathan Batty found that Bradford improperly used constituents' personal information obtained from his city hall office for campaign purposes during the 2023 by-election for mayor, violating city council's code of conduct.

In a letter to Batty, Bradford described the incidents as a "mistake", caused when a campaign volunteer who was a former employee at his city hall office uploaded an email database believed to be from a previous campaign, but was actually from his council office's database. Bradford took responsibility for the error and offered an apology.

==== 2026 mayoral election ====
Reports in early 2025 speculated that Bradford would attempt another run for mayor of Toronto in the 2026 election. In the lead-up to the election, Bradford held "campaign-style" events outside of his ward to criticize incumbent mayor Olivia Chow. On October 1, 2025, Bradford confirmed his intention to run for mayor the following year, registering as a candidate on May 1, 2026.

Prior to formally registering as a candidate, developer Nick Ainis hosted an event in Concord, Ontario, titled "An Evening With Brad Bradford", selling tickets for $250. Candidates are prohibited from raising or spending money to campaign until registering, and a complaint was filed by Progress Toronto who called for an investigation by the integrity commissioner. The complaint described the event a "cash-for-access" arrangement, noting the potential for there to be a violation of the city's code of conduct. The group did not provide evidence of wrongdoing and Bradford dismissed the complaint as a "smear". The developer told the Toronto Star that revenue would be used to pay for the event and fund his podcast.

Bradford's campaign focused on crime, congestion, and the cost of living. He changed his stance on many issues during this campaign, such as proposing to remove stretches of bike lanes which he voted to implement prior. He was criticized by Chow in her campaign advertising for his changes in stance. He maintains that they were in response to evidence after the fact, such as in a press conference where he stated, “it became clear that council, including me, got this one wrong.” Bradford also faced criticism from Chow's campaign over his Toronto Water reform proposals. During the campaign, Bradford was endorsed by several Conservative and Liberal politicians, including Jennifer McKelvie, Lisa Raitt, Tim Hudak, and Erin O'Toole.

Bradford placed second behind Olivia Chow, winning 41.11% of the vote with 404,013 votes.

== Personal life ==
Bradford's mother, Valerie Bradford, served as the member of Parliament (MP) for Kitchener South—Hespeler from 2021 to 2025. He has two daughters, Briar and Bronwyn, with his wife Kathryn.

== Election results ==
2026 Toronto mayoral election
Mayoral candidate	Votes	%
Olivia Chow	532,201	54.16%
Brad Bradford	404,013	41.11%
Braeden Chow	8,102	0.82%
Chris Alexander	3,550	0.36%
Edward Gong	3,443	0.35%
Laura Dean	2,224	0.23%
Darrell Brown	2,077	0.21%
Imad Abdulkadir	1,873	0.19%
Bahira Abdulsalam	1,696	0.17%
Rick Lee	1,288	0.13%
Logan Choy	1,282	0.13%
Sandeep Srivastava	1,149	0.12%
Kevin Clarke	1,089	0.11%
Georgios Kalkounis	1,085	0.11%
Roberto Curto	959	0.10%
Sarah McVie	957	0.10%
Jamie Atkinson	932	0.09%
Amy Rosen	919	0.09%
Paul Collins	845	0.09%
Lyall Sanders	784	0.08%
Mohamad Kaaki	727	0.07%
Joshua Thompson	709	0.07%
Brian Buffey	649	0.07%
Laura Ellis	630	0.06%
Michael Lamoureux	570	0.06%
Robert Shusterman	522	0.05%
Cory Deville	485	0.05%
Odessa Paloma Parker	457	0.05%
Martin Fraser	437	0.04%
Alton Frederick	432	0.04%
Heather He	421	0.04%
Mostafa Zandkarimi	396	0.04%
Faizan Haider	370	0.04%
Alex Cruze	366	0.04%
Kuo Yu Tong	366	0.04%
Habiba Desai	364	0.04%
Weizhen Tang	354	0.04%
Francis Mercieca	352	0.04%
Thomas Hall	341	0.03%
Faisal Razi	337	0.03%
Gus Prokos	327	0.03%
Jack Hartley	322	0.03%
Joseph Osuji	320	0.03%
Naomi Sayers	274	0.03%
Peter Handjis	270	0.03%
Isidoros Kyrlangitses	256	0.03%
Leila Yohannes	206	0.02%
Reagan Levermany	202	0.02%
Eddie Mayanja	193	0.02%
Wincess Dorville	175	0.02%
Henoke Yohannes	157	0.02%
Jeffery Tunney	133	0.01%
Jack Weenen	72	0.01%
Total	982,660	100%
Source: City of Toronto (unofficial results)

2023 Toronto mayoral by-election
Mayoral Candidate	Vote	%
Olivia Chow	269,372	37.17%
Ana Bailão	235,175	32.46%
Mark Saunders	62,167	8.58%
Anthony Furey	35,899	4.96%
Josh Matlow	35,572	4.91%
Mitzie Hunter	21,299	2.93%
Chloe Brown	18,831	2.60%
Brad Bradford	9,254	1.28%
Chris Saccoccia	8,001	1.10%
Anthony Perruzza	3,025	0.42%
Xiao Hua Gong	2,983	0.41%
Lyall Sanders	2,775	0.38%
Giorgio Mammoliti	1,105	0.15%
Bahira Abdulsalam	913	0.13%
Sharif Ahmed	814	0.11%
Raksheni Sivaneswaran	779	0.11%
Dionysios Apostolopoulos	726	0.10%
Logan Choy	695	0.10%
Toby Heaps	593	0.08%
Roland Chan	515	0.07%
Reginald Tull	482	0.07%
Rob Davis	378	0.05%
Jamie Atkinson	361	0.05%
Frank D'Amico	357	0.05%
Gru Jesse Allan	352	0.05%
Frank D'Angelo	343	0.05%
Eliazar Bonilla	310	0.04%
Heather He	297	0.04%
Kiri Vadivelu	290	0.04%
Jose Baking	284	0.04%
Danny Chevalier Romero	281	0.04%
Monica Forrester	278	0.04%
Cleveland Marshall	270	0.04%
Kevin Clarke	265	0.04%
Blake Acton	264	0.04%
Mark LeLiever	259	0.04%
Thomas Hall	258	0.04%
Asadul Alam	257	0.04%
Celina Caesar-Chavannes	254	0.03%
Knia Singh	246	0.03%
Rick Lee	241	0.03%
Emmanuel Acquaye	236	0.03%
Willie Reodica	225	0.03%
Patricia Johnston	217	0.03%
Gordon Cohen	214	0.03%
Ben Bankas	203	0.03%
Bob Murphy	203	0.03%
Feng Gao	198	0.03%
Habiba Desai	196	0.03%
Sarah Climenhaga	195	0.03%
Darren Atkinson	192	0.03%
D!ONNE Renée	188	0.03%
Nathalie Xian Yi Yan	180	0.02%
Ari Grosman	177	0.02%
Paul Collins	168	0.02%
Sandeep Srivastava	166	0.02%
Monowar Hossain	164	0.02%
Norman MacLeod	163	0.02%
Jody Williams	160	0.02%
Claudette Beals	151	0.02%
Mason Carrie	150	0.02%
Atef Aly	147	0.02%
Syed Jaffery	147	0.02%
Kris Langenfeld	137	0.02%
Matti Charlton	134	0.02%
Partap Dua Singh	132	0.02%
Meir Straus	129	0.02%
Samson Deb	129	0.02%
Peter Handjis	127	0.02%
Steve Mann	127	0.02%
Weizhen Tang	125	0.02%
David Gulyas	120	0.02%
Michael Lamoureux	120	0.02%
Glen Benway	118	0.02%
John Winter	118	0.02%
Michael Jensen	115	0.02%
Robert Shusterman	114	0.02%
Brian Buffey	113	0.02%
Scott Furnival	110	0.02%
Walayat Khan	109	0.01%
Adil Goraya	104	0.01%
James Guglielmin	101	0.01%
Simryn Fenby	97	0.01%
Cory Deville	96	0.01%
Serge Korovitsyn	96	0.01%
Rocco Schipano	94	0.01%
Brian Graff	89	0.01%
Isabella Gamk	88	0.01%
Michael Nicula	88	0.01%
Jeffery Tunney	83	0.01%
Yuanqian Wei	78	0.01%
John Ransome	75	0.01%
Mitchell Toye	72	0.01%
Phillip D'Cruze	68	0.01%
Walter Rubino	67	0.01%
John Letonja	45	0.01%
Sheila Igodan	42	0.01%
Erwin Sniedzins	38	0.01%
Jamil Nowwarah	38	0.01%
Jack Weenen	30	0.00%
Daniel Irmya	27	0.00%
	722,877	100%

2022 Toronto municipal election, Ward 19 Beaches—East York
Candidate	Vote	%
Brad Bradford	15,169	54.71
Jennie Worden	6,291	22.69
Adam Smith	1,902	6.86
Steven Thompson	1,735	6.26
Frank Marra	1,460	5.27
Donna Braniff	703	2.53
Sébastien Auger	469	1.69
Total	27,729	100%
Source: City of Toronto

2018 Toronto municipal election, Ward 19 Beaches—East York
Candidate	Votes	Vote share
Brad Bradford	14,286	38.56%
Matthew Kellway	13,998	37.78%
Joshua Makuch	2,315	6.25%
Diane Dyson	1,612	4.35%
Veronica Stephen	1,257	3.39%
Valérie Maltais	929	2.51%
Adam Smith	708	1.91%
Brenda MacDonald	601	1.62%
Paul Bura	288	0.78%
David Del Grande	283	0.76%
Morley Rosenberg	248	0.67%
Frank Marra	142	0.38%
Donald Lamoreux	141	0.38%
Norval Bryant	89	0.24%
Dragan Cimesa	77	0.21%
Paul Murton	74	0.20%
Total	37,048	100%
Source: City of Toronto

== See also ==
- List of University of Waterloo people
