= 2018 Toronto municipal election =

2018 municipal election in Toronto, Ontario, Canada

- October 22, 2018
Council before election
(see table)
Elected Council
Toronto City Council 2018–2022

Municipal elections were held on October 22, 2018, to elect a mayor and city councillors in Toronto, Ontario, Canada. Registration for candidates for the office of mayor, councillor, and school board trustee opened on May 1, 2018, and initially closed on July 27, 2018. John Tory won the mayoral election with over 60% of the vote.

To account for the city's growing population, Toronto's council wards underwent a realignment. With the removal of a ward in the west end, three new wards added in the downtown area, and a new ward in North York, this expanding the city from 44 wards to 47 wards. In July 2018, newly-elected Premier of Ontario Doug Ford introduced legislation to require that Toronto's municipal elections use the same ridings as it does for provincial and federal elections, thus reducing the council to 25 wards. The bill attracted controversy for its intent to change electoral boundaries in the middle of a campaign, and was struck down as unconstitutional in September 2018 but a stay on this ruling was granted nine days later by the Court of Appeal for Ontario. The three judge panel ruled the bill was constitutional and that the previous ruling was "dubious", thus reinstating the 25-ward election.

Seventeen Toronto councillors were elected with less than half of the votes cast in their ward. One councillor, Cynthia Lai was elected with approximately 27% of the votes cast.

== Ward boundary adjustment ==
The Toronto City Council commissioned an independent review of its ward boundaries in order to account for predicted population growth in specific areas of the city. The consultants recommended the realignment of the city's 44 wards into 47. Under the 47-ward model, wards would not achieve voter parity until 2026 (when the population projection of 61,000 residents per ward would eventually kick in). The Supreme Court considers voter parity to be crucial to achieving effective representation.

Three new wards were added in downtown, one in North York, while one was removed from Toronto's west end by consolidating 3 wards into 2. Based on the patterns of incumbents shifting to successor wards, the four "new" wards are Ward 20, Ward 21, Ward 25 and Ward 29; the ward reduction in the west end is reflected in the effective merger of what had been designated as Ward 17 and Ward 18 on the preceding map into new Ward 16.

Two city councillors, Giorgio Mammoliti and Justin Di Ciano, along with several Toronto citizens, appealed the redrawing of ward boundaries at the Ontario Municipal Board. The appeal was rejected and new ward boundaries approved in a 38-page decision. The council had to pass a by-law before January 2018 for the boundaries to be changed before the election.

=== Reduction of wards ===
On July 27, 2018, the last day for candidate registration, former councillor and new Ontario Premier Doug Ford introduced the Better Local Government Act, also known as Bill 5. The legislation required that the Toronto city council align its municipal wards with those of the federal and provincial electoral ridings, thus reducing the size of Toronto's council from 47 to 25 wards. Each council member would serve an area representing an average of 111,000 residents. Ford justified the legislation by stating that the council had "failed to act on the critical issues facing the city", and that expanding it to 47 wards would exacerbate the existing "dysfunction". The province claimed that such a reduction would result in a savings of $25 million over the next four years (in comparison to the city's operating budget of $11.12 billion per-year). The bill also cancelled pending elections for regional chair in the regional municipalities of Niagara and Muskoka, Peel, and York, resetting all four positions back to appointed, rather than elected, offices.

The bill proved controversial, with the official opposition Ontario NDP disputing its intent and considering it an abuse of power, while other groups (including candidates and the Toronto District School Board) contended that the bill undermined the democratic process. Toronto mayor John Tory suggested that such significant changes be subject to a public referendum. Toronto's city council voted 24-17 on a motion to oppose Bill 5 and support Tory's call for a referendum. Tory also criticized Ford for not providing any opportunities to consult with the municipal government over the bill. Ford denied Tory's statement, stating that he had met with Tory and other officials multiple times. Bill 5 was passed August 14, 2018. Rocco Achampong, a candidate for one of the wards removed in the consolidation, launched a legal challenge over the bill in the Ontario Superior Court.

The government of Ontario argued that the larger wards were intended to improve voter parity for the 2018 municipal election (as the 47 ward model would not achieve voter parity until 2026). However, the city asserted that the 25-ward model provided no better parity than the newly-implemented 47-ward structure, and a consultant argued that the roughly doubled ward population reduced councillors' capacity to serve their communities—another aspect of effective representation. In an affidavit, Toronto city manager Giuliana Carbone disputed the claimed cost savings, stating that it would only save $6 million over four years, taking into account the increased staffing that would be required to operate the larger wards, and the costs incurred by realigning the election to match the new boundaries.

On September 10, 2018, the Better Local Government Act was struck down as unconstitutional by Superior Court Justice Edward Belobaba, ruling that the larger wards infringed on citizens' rights to effective electoral representation, and that unilaterally changing electoral boundaries in the middle of a campaign infringed on candidates' freedom of expression. He explained that "passing a law that changes the city's electoral districts in the middle of its election and undermines the overall fairness of the election is antithetical to the core principles of our democracy", and questioned the province's intent and timing of the legislation. Ford criticized the ruling, contending that its only supporters were a "small group of left-wing councillors looking to continue their free ride on the taxpayers' dollar and a network of activist groups who have entrenched their power under the status quo."

The Ford government introduced the Efficient Local Government Act, also known as Bill 31, on September 12, 2018. The bill would have invoked Section 33 of the Canadian Charter of Rights and Freedoms, also known as the notwithstanding clause, to implement the effects of Bill 5 in defiance of the court ruling. If passed, it would have been the first time that the notwithstanding clause had ever been invoked in Ontario. The Toronto city council voted 29–7 in favour of directing the city solicitor to challenge the new legislation in court, and to ask the federal government to invoke a constitutional clause allowing it to disallow provincial legislation (a mechanism only used once since 1943) should it pass. At a Liberal Party caucus retreat in Saskatoon, Prime Minister Justin Trudeau stated that he would not contribute to the discussions surrounding the sizes of municipal governments in Ontario, as it was "[not] a role that the federal government needs to take on".

On September 19, 2018, the Court of Appeal for Ontario in Toronto (City) v Ontario (Attorney General) issued a stay on the previous Superior Court decision, ruling that Bill 5 "disrupted the campaigns that were already underway" but "does not limit or restrict any message the candidates wish to convey to voters", and was a "dubious ruling that invalidates legislation duly passed by the legislature". As such, the election would be required to use the 25-ward alignment mandated by Bill 5. Since it was made redundant by the stay, Bill 31 was also withdrawn. The nomination period was reopened as a result of the stay and closed on September 21, 2018.

In a judgment rendered October 1, 2021, the Supreme Court of Canada upheld the constitutionality of the provisions, and the 25-ward model remained in effect for this and the following 2022 Toronto municipal election.

== City Council (25-ward model) ==
=== Ward 1 Etobicoke North ===
Candidate	Votes	Percentage	Registration Date	Notes
(incumbent)Michael Ford	10,648	42.26%	July 4, 2018	Councillor for former Ward 2 since 2016. Nephew of Ontario Premier Doug Ford. Endorsed by Toronto Sun.
(incumbent)Vincent Crisanti	8,654	34.34%	May 1, 2018	Councillor for former Ward 1 since 2010.
Naiima Farah	2,262	8.98%	July 27, 2018	
Shirish Patel	1,945	7.72%	May 1, 2018	
Carol Royer	642	2.55%	July 27, 2018	Endorsed by Toronto Star and NOW magazine.
Michelle Garcia	439	1.74%	July 26, 2018	
Peter D'Gama	253	1.00%	July 20, 2018	
Christopher Noor	214	0.85%	July 9, 2018	
Gurinder Patri	142	0.56%	July 27, 2018	

=== Ward 2 Etobicoke Centre ===
Candidate	Votes	Percentage	Registration Date	Notes
(incumbent)Stephen Holyday	14,627	38.58%	June 4, 2018	Councillor for former Ward 3 since 2014. Endorsed by Toronto Sun.
(incumbent)John Campbell	13,441	35.45%	May 4, 2018	Councillor for former Ward 4 since 2014. Endorsed by Toronto Star.
Angelo Carnevale	5,735	15.13%	June 13, 2018	
Erica Kelly	3,854	10.16%	July 16, 2018	NDP candidate in 2018 provincial election. Endorsed by NOW magazine.
Bill Boersma	258	0.68%	July 27, 2018	

=== Ward 3 Etobicoke—Lakeshore ===
Candidate	Votes	Percentage	Registration Date	Notes
(incumbent)Mark Grimes	16,527	40.90%	July 25, 2018	Councillor for former Ward 6 since 2003. Endorsed by Toronto Sun.
Amber Morley	10,985	27.19%	May 10, 2018	Endorsed by Toronto & York District Labour Council, Progress Toronto, Toronto Star, and NOW magazine.
Pamela Gough	7,301	18.07%	May 1, 2018	TDSB school trustee
Iain Davis	2,722	6.74%	July 27, 2018	
Svitlana Burlakova	1,218	3.01%	July 27, 2018	
Peggy Moulder	575	1.42%	July 27, 2018	
Patrizia Nigro	394	0.98%	May 31, 2018	
Michael Julihen	320	0.79%	August 29, 2018	
Michael Loomans	199	0.49%	July 5, 2018	
Robert Gunnyon	167	0.41%	September 20, 2018	

=== Ward 4 Parkdale—High Park ===
Candidate	Votes	Percentage	Registration Date	Notes
(incumbent)Gord Perks	16,887	44.55%	May 1, 2018	Councillor for former Ward 14 since 2006. Endorsed by Toronto & York District Labour Council, the Toronto Star, Jennifer Keesmaat, and NOW magazine.
David Ginsberg	8,181	21.58%	July 16, 2018	
Kalsang Dolma	5,352	14.12%	May 7, 2018	
Evan Tummillo	2,367	6.24%	May 1, 2018	Endorsed by Toronto Sun.
Valerie Grdisa	1,771	4.67%	September 21, 2018	
Nick Pavlov	874	2.31%	July 27, 2018	
Taras Kulish	868	2.29%	July 27, 2018	
Alex Perez	686	1.81%	July 27, 2018	
José Vera	544	1.44%	June 29, 2018	
Mercy Okalowe	373	0.98%	July 12, 2018	

=== Ward 5 York South—Weston ===
Candidate	Votes	Percentage	Registration Date	Notes
(incumbent)Frances Nunziata	8,425	32.18%	June 4, 2018	Councillor for former Ward 11 since 2000. Endorsed by Toronto Sun.
(incumbent)Frank Di Giorgio	5,674	21.67%	May 4, 2018	Councillor for former Ward 12 since 2000
Chiara Padovani	5,358	20.47%	May 1, 2018	Endorsed by Progress Toronto
Lekan Olawoye	3,889	14.85%	May 1, 2018	Endorsed by Toronto & York District Labour Council, Toronto Star, and NOW magazine.
Deega Barre	1,172	4.48%	May 16, 2018	
Keaton Austin	467	1.78%	July 26, 2018	
Luis Portillo	352	1.34%	June 6, 2018	
Fred Fosu	245	0.94%	July 27, 2018	
Joey Carapinha	241	0.92%	May 1, 2018	
Cedric Ogalvie	189	0.72%	July 24, 2018	
Harpeet Gulri	168	0.64%	July 23, 2018	

=== Ward 6 York Centre ===
Candidate	Votes	Percentage	Registration Date	Notes
(incumbent)James Pasternak	11,559	47.61%	May 15, 2018	Councillor for former Ward 10 since 2010. Endorsed by Toronto Sun.
(incumbent)Maria Augimeri	9,223	37.99%	May 1, 2018	Councillor for former Ward 9 since 2000. Endorsed by Toronto & York District Labour Council, Toronto Star, and NOW magazine.
Louise Russo	2,726	11.23%	July 20, 2018	Sought Liberal nomination for the 2018 provincial election in York Centre Prominent anti-violence advocate, namesake of a city park in neighbouring Ward 7 Humber River—Black Creek
Edward Zaretsky	771	3.17%	July 23, 2018	Operator of community group, Citizens Alliance Group. Ran for city council in 2010.

=== Ward 7 Humber River—Black Creek ===
Candidate	Votes	Percentage	Registration Date	Notes
(incumbent)Anthony Perruzza	8,336	36.80%	July 5, 2018	Councillor for former Ward 8 since 2008. Former Metro Toronto Separate School Board Trustee (1985–1988), North York Councillor (1988–1990) and NDP MPP for Downsview (1990–1995). Endorsed by Progress Toronto, Toronto & York District Labour Council and Toronto Star.
(incumbent)Giorgio Mammoliti	5,625	24.83%	May 1, 2018	Councillor for former Ward 7 since 2000. Endorsed by Toronto Sun.
Deanna Sgro	4,512	19.92%	July 5, 2018	Liberal candidate in 2018 provincial election; daughter of former councillor and current MP Judy Sgro.
Tiffany Ford	3,187	14.07%	May 7, 2018	TDSB school trustee. Endorsed by Progress Toronto and NOW magazine.
Amanda Coombs	445	1.96%	July 4, 2018	
Winston LaRose	247	1.09%	July 17, 2018	Activist whose campaign was the subject of the 2019 documentary film Mr. Jane and Finch.
Kerry-Ann Thomas	153	0.68%	September 20, 2018	Consultant and Political Advisor since 2009. Queen's Park Ontario Legislature Staff (2005–2007), TV Host and Journalist. OWIT-Toronto (Organization of Women in International Trade) Member (2010–present)
Kristy-Ann Charles	147	0.65%	July 26, 2018	

=== Ward 8 Eglinton—Lawrence ===
Candidate	Votes	Percentage	Registration Date	Notes
Mike Colle	14,094	41.34%	July 25, 2018	Former Liberal MPP for Eglinton—Lawrence (1995–2018), provincial cabinet minister (2005–07), Metro Councillor for York (1988–94), Chair of Toronto Transit Commission (1991–94), York Councillor (1982–85). Father of incumbent Councillor for former Ward 15 Josh Colle. Endorsed by Toronto Star.
(incumbent)Christin Carmichael Greb	7,395	21.69%	May 1, 2018	Councillor for former Ward 16 since 2014. Endorsed by Toronto Sun.
Dyanoosh Youssefi	5,253	15.41%	May 1, 2018	Endorsed by Progress Toronto and NOW magazine.
Beth Levy	3,122	9.16%	May 4, 2018	Endorsed by former Mayor of Toronto and MP David Crombie; Former urban planner.
Jennifer Arp	2,404	7.05%	May 18, 2018	TDSB school trustee
Lauralyn Johnston	992	2.91%	June 18, 2018	Urban planner with the City of Toronto since 2012.
Josh Pede	420	1.23%	September 20, 2018	
Darren Dunlop	210	0.62%	June 21, 2018	Real estate agent
Randall Pancer	134	0.39%	July 23, 2018	
Peter Tijiri	72	0.21%	July 17, 2018	

=== Ward 9 Davenport ===
Candidate	Votes	Percentage	Registration Date	Notes
(incumbent)Ana Bailão	26,219	83.62%	May 1, 2018	Councillor for former Ward 18 since 2010. Endorsed by Toronto & York District Labour Council, Toronto Star, NOW magazine. and Toronto Sun.
Nahum Mann	2,804	8.94%	July 26, 2018	
Troy Young	1,218	3.88%	July 10, 2018	
Mark Balack	1,114	3.55%	September 7, 2018	

=== Ward 10 Spadina—Fort York ===
Candidate	Votes	Percentage	Registration Date	Notes
(incumbent)Joe Cressy	15,903	55.06%	May 1, 2018	Councillor for former Ward 20 since 2014. Endorsed by Toronto & York District Labour Council, Toronto Star, and NOW magazine.
April Engelberg	3,346	11.58%	July 5, 2018	Lawyer.
Kevin Vuong	3,018	10.45%	May 1, 2018	Former banker, lecturer at University of Toronto, and military officer. Endorsed by Toronto Sun.
Sabrina Zuniga	1,564	5.41%	May 1, 2018	
John Nguyen	1,032	3.57%	June 11, 2018	
Karlene Nation	860	2.98%	July 24, 2018	Former broadcaster.
Rick Myers	747	2.59%	July 26, 2018	Small business owner.
Dean Maher	611	2.12%	June 15, 2018	
Al Carbone	519	1.80%	July 20, 2018	Restaurant owner.
Andrew Massey	473	1.64%	July 27, 2018	
Michael Barcelos	451	1.56%	July 26, 2018	
Edris Zalmai	147	0.51%	July 24, 2018	
Andrei Zodian	133	0.46%	September 21, 2018	
Ahdam Dour	80	0.28%	July 16, 2018	

=== Ward 11 University—Rosedale ===
Candidate	Votes	Percentage	Registration Date	Notes
(incumbent)Mike Layton	22,370	69.56%	July 10, 2018	Son of the late former federal NDP leader Jack Layton. Councillor for former Ward 19 since 2010. Endorsed by Toronto & York District Labour Council, Toronto Star, and NOW magazine.
Joyce Rowlands	4,231	13.16%	September 21, 2018	Former provincial Liberal candidate and daughter of former Toronto mayor June Rowlands. Endorsed by Toronto Sun.
Nicki Ward	2,933	9.12%	September 20, 2018	
Marc Cormier	995	3.09%	July 26, 2018	
Michael Borrelli	671	2.09%	July 27, 2018	
Michael Shaw	581	1.81%	July 24, 2018	
George Sawision	376	1.17%	July 20, 2018	

=== Ward 12 Toronto—St. Paul's ===
Candidate	Votes	Percentage	Registration Date	Notes
(incumbent)Josh Matlow	20,371	51.60%	July 4, 2018	Councillor for former Ward 22 since 2010. Endorsed by Toronto Star.
(incumbent)Joe Mihevc	16,634	42.14%	May 17, 2018	Councillor for former Ward 21 since 2000. Endorsed by Toronto & York District Labour Council, John Tory, NOW magazine. and Toronto Sun.
Ian Lipton	930	2.36%	July 27, 2018	
Elizabeth Cook	908	2.30%	September 21, 2018	
Bob Murphy	342	0.87%	July 27, 2018	
Artur Langu	290	0.73%	July 27, 2018	

=== Ward 13 Toronto Centre ===
Candidate	Votes	Percentage	Registration Date	Notes
(incumbent)Kristyn Wong-Tam	15,706	50.26%	May 1, 2018	Councillor for former Ward 27 since 2010. Endorsed by Toronto & York District Labour Council, Toronto Star and NOW magazine.
George Smitherman	4,734	15.15%	May 9, 2018	Former Liberal MPP for Toronto Centre-Rosedale (1999-2010) and provincial cabinet minister (2003–10)
(incumbent)Lucy Troisi	2,698	8.63%	July 26, 2018	Councillor for former Ward 28 since 2017, appointed to office upon death of Pam McConnell. Endorsed by Toronto Sun.
Khuram Aftab	1,794	5.74%	July 18, 2018	
Walied Khogali Ali	1,408	4.51%	May 11, 2018	
Ryan Lester	968	3.10%	June 25, 2018	
Tim Gordanier	734	2.35%	July 26, 2018	
Jon Callegher	713	2.28%	May 7, 2018	
John Jeffery	530	1.70%	July 26, 2018	
Catherina Perez	511	1.64%	June 12, 2018	
Megann Willson	411	1.32%	May 1, 2018	
Barbara Lavoie	176	0.56%	September 21, 2018	
Jordan Stone	161	0.52%	July 27, 2018	
Richard Forget	150	0.48%	May 18, 2018	
Jonathan Heath	144	0.46%	July 27, 2018	
Kyle McNally	138	0.44%	July 27, 2018	
Darren Abramson	108	0.35%	September 21, 2018	
Gladys Larbie	101	0.32%	June 11, 2018	
Rob Wolvin	64	0.20%	July 27, 2018	2014 Councillor candidate - Toronto Centre-Rosedale, 2015 Progressive Canadian Party candidate: Etobicoke Centre; employed in the film industry.

=== Ward 14 Toronto—Danforth ===
Candidate	Votes	Percentage	Registration Date	Notes
(incumbent)Paula Fletcher	16,468	42.27%	May 1, 2018	Councillor for former Ward 30 since 2003. Endorsed by Toronto & York District Labour Council, Toronto Star, and NOW magazine.
(incumbent)Mary Fragedakis	10,201	26.18%	May 1, 2018	Councillor for former Ward 29 since 2010. Endorsed by NOW magazine and Toronto Sun.
Chris Budo	7,394	18.98%	May 24, 2018	
Lanrick Bennett	1,935	4.97%	June 11, 2018	
Dixon Chan	1,100	2.82%	May 4, 2018	
Chris Marinakis	700	1.80%	September 20, 2018	
Marisol D'Andrea	429	1.10%	June 21, 2018	
Ryan Lindsay	413	1.06%	July 13, 2018	
Lawrence Lychowyd	188	0.48%	September 21, 2018	
Alexander Pena	131	0.34%	July 25, 2018	

=== Ward 15 Don Valley West ===
Candidate	Votes	Percentage	Registration Date	Notes
(incumbent)Jaye Robinson	16,219	49.22%	May 31, 2018	Councillor for former Ward 25 since 2010. Endorsed by Toronto Sun.
(incumbent)Jon Burnside	14,440	43.82%	May 1, 2018	Councillor for former Ward 26 since 2014. Endorsed by Toronto Star, NOW magazine. and Toronto Sun.
Tanweer Khan	1,309	3.97%	July 6, 2018	
Nikola Streker	583	1.77%	July 23, 2018	
Minh Le	404	1.23%	September 21, 2018	

=== Ward 16 Don Valley East ===
Candidate	Votes	Percentage	Registration Date	Notes
(incumbent)Denzil Minnan-Wong	11,128	43.33%	July 4, 2018	Councillor for former Ward 34 since 2000, Deputy Mayor of Toronto since 2014, provincial PC candidate in 2018. Endorsed by Toronto Sun.
David Caplan	7,277	30.3%	July 27, 2018	Former Liberal MPP for Don Valley East (1997-2011) and provincial cabinet minister (2003–09). Endorsed by Toronto Star and NOW magazine.
Stephen Ksiazek	1,698	7.07%	May 1, 2018	
Dimitre Popov	1,104	4.6%	June 28, 2018	
Pushpalatha Mathanalingam	888	3.7%	July 9, 2018	
Michael Woulfe	771	3.21%	July 26, 2018	
Aria Alavi	582	2.42%	May 7, 2018	
Diane Gadoutsis	569	2.37%	September 21, 2018	

=== Ward 17 Don Valley North ===
Candidate	Votes	Percentage	Registration Date	Notes
Shelley Carroll	10,554	40.44%	July 6, 2018	Councillor for former Ward 33 (2003–2018), provincial Liberal candidate in 2018. Endorsed by Toronto & York District Labour Council, Toronto Star, and NOW magazine.
Christina Liu	7,552	28.94%	July 3, 2018	Endorsed by Vincent Ke, Bob Saroya, Mel Lastman, former Willowdale MP Chungsen Leung (2011–2015) and Toronto Sun.
Ken Lister	3,410	13.07%	May 1, 2018	Toronto District School Board trustee.
Steven Chen	2,095	8.03%	July 9, 2018	CPA, CGA. Endorsed by Joe Daniel, former Don Valley East MP (2011-2015). Endorsed by Carl Qiu, President of OPCYA . Endorsed by Sam Chopra, President of South Asians In Ontario. Endorsed by former Willowdale MP Chungsen Leung (2011–2015).
Ian Hanecak	879	3.37%	June 21, 2018	
Erin O'Connor	453	1.74%	July 27, 2018	
Kostas Kokkinakis	438	1.68%	September 21, 2018	
Stella Kargiannakis	413	1.58%	July 3, 2018	
Kasra Gharibi	305	1.17%	July 11, 2018	

=== Ward 18 Willowdale ===
Candidate	Votes	Percentage	Registration Date	Notes
(incumbent)John Filion	8,104	31.06%	September 6, 2018	Councillor for former Ward 23 since 2000 and for predecessor ward of York Centre (1998–2000). Endorsed by NOW magazine.
Lily Cheng	5,149	19.74%	June 20, 2018	Founder of North York Moms; Co-Founder of We Love Willowdale, in response to the Toronto van attack. Endorsed by Toronto Star.
Sonny Cho	3,130	12.00%	May 2, 2018	Former City Councillor candidate for Willowdale Ward 24; Willowdale 150 Medal Recipient; Ontario Place Board Director; CEO of Canada Korea Business Council; Endorsed by former Willowdale MP C. S. Leung and former MPP Michael Chan.
David Mousavi	1,596	6.12%	July 26, 2018	
Danny DeSantis	1,486	5.70%	June 20, 2018	Endorsed by Corriere Canadese, Mark Grimes, Judy Sgro, Alfred Apps, and Chungsen Leung.
Norman Gardner	1,476	5.67%	June 27, 2018	Former Metro Toronto Councillor (1985–1997), and Toronto City Councillor (1997–2000); former Chair of Toronto Police Services Board (1998–2004). Progressive Conservative candidate in Willowdale in the 1997 federal election.
Sam Moini	1,289	4.94%	May 2, 2018	Endorsed by Toronto Sun.
Saman Tabasi Nejad	1,189	4.56%	July 17, 2018	Endorsed by Toronto & York District Labour Council, NDP MPPs Marit Stiles and Faisal Hassan.
Winston Park	593	2.27%	May 1, 2018	Councillor candidate for former ward 23 in 2014 as Kun-Won Park. Endorsed by Senator Yonah Martin, and former Conservative Willowdale MP Chungsen Leung
Gerald Mak	545	2.09%	July 17, 2018	
David Epstein	538	2.96%	July 20, 2018	
Albert Kim	291	1.12%	July 18, 2018	Endorsed by former PC Don Valley East MP Alan Redway and former Conservative Willowdale MP Chungsen Leung.
Farah Aslani	187	0.72%	September 21, 2018	
Andrew Herbst	162	0.62%	July 23, 2018	
Hamid Shakeri	122	0.47%	July 26, 2018	
Chung Jin Park	101	0.39%	May 2, 2018	
Sam Mathi	66	0.25%	July 26, 2018	
Marvin Honickman	61	0.23%	21 Sep 2018	

=== Ward 19 Beaches—East York ===
Candidate	Votes	Percentage	Registration Date	Notes
Brad Bradford	14,286	38.56%	June 15, 2018	Endorsed by retiring Ward 32 councillor Mary-Margaret McMahon, John Tory, and Toronto Sun.
Matthew Kellway	13,998	37.78%	May 22, 2018	Former NDP MP for Beaches—East York (2011–2015). Endorsed by retiring Ward 31 councillor Janet Davis Endorsed by Toronto & York District Labour Council and Toronto Star.
Joshua Makuch	2,315	6.25%	May 2, 2018	
Diane Dyson	1,613	4.35%	June 13, 2018	Researcher and policy advocate for People for Education, United Way of Greater Toronto, and WoodGreen Community Services Endorsed by NOW magazine.
Veronica Stephen	1,257	3.39%	July 27, 2018	
Valérie Maltais	929	2.51%	May 1, 2018	
Adam Smith	708	1.91%	July 26, 2018	
Brenda MacDonald	601	1.62%	June 11, 2018	
Paul Bura	288	0.78%	July 20, 2018	
David Del Grande	283	0.76%	June 20, 2018	
Morley Rosenberg	248	0.67%	July 25, 2018	Former Mayor of Kitchener (1977-1982).
Frank Marra	142	0.38%	July 26, 2018	
Donald Lamoreux	141	0.38%	September 21, 2018	
Norval Bryant	89	0.24%	July 27, 2018	
Dragan Cimesa	77	0.21%	September 21, 2018	
Paul Murton	74	0.20%	July 26, 2018	

=== Ward 20 Scarborough Southwest ===
Candidate	Votes	Percentage	Registration Date	Notes
(incumbent)Gary Crawford	10,505	35.73%	May 1, 2018	Councillor for former Ward 36 since 2010 Endorsed by Toronto Sun.
(incumbent)Michelle Holland-Berardinetti	10,094	34.33%	June 11, 2018	Councillor for former Ward 35 since 2010. Endorsed by Toronto Sun.
Mohsin Bhuiyan	2,910	9.9%	May 1, 2018	
Paulina Corpuz	1,813	6.17%	June 12, 2018	
Suman Roy	1,582	5.38%	May 3, 2018	Endorsed by Toronto Star and NOW magazine.
Gerard Arbour	1,187	4.04%	May 4, 2018	
Curtis Smith	541	1.84%	July 16, 2018	
Robert McDermott	367	1.25%	May 1, 2018	
Bruce Waters	246	0.84%	August 28, 2018	
John Letonja	160	0.54%	June 4, 2018	

=== Ward 21 Scarborough Centre ===
Candidate	Votes	Percentage	Registration Date	Notes
(incumbent)Michael Thompson	16,542	69.05%	May 9, 2018	Councillor for former Ward 37 since 2003. Endorsed by Toronto Star, NOW magazine, and Toronto Sun.
Paul Beatty	1,638	6.84%	July 27, 2018	
Fawzi Bidawi	1,035	4.32%	July 16, 2018	
Zia Choudhary	1,014	4.23%	May 2, 2018	
Vivek Bhatt	993	4.15%	July 18, 2018	
Randy Bucao	949	3.96%	May 9, 2018	
Raphael Rosch	545	2.28%	July 24, 2018	
Zamir ul-Hassan Nadeem	448	1.87%	May 8, 2018	
Afran Naveed	349	1.46%	May 9, 2018	
Ismail Khan	311	1.30%	July 27, 2018	
Nur Saifullah	132	0.55%	July 26, 2018	

=== Ward 22 Scarborough—Agincourt ===
Candidate	Votes	Percentage	Registration Date	Notes
(incumbent)Jim Karygiannis	12,593	46.8%	May 1, 2018	Councillor for former Ward 39 since 2014, former Liberal MP (1988–2014)
(incumbent)Norm Kelly	9,944	36.96%	May 14, 2018	Councillor for former Ward 40 since 2000, former Liberal MP (1980–1984), former Deputy Mayor (2013–2014). Endorsed by Toronto Star and Toronto Sun.
Roland Lin	2,789	10.37%	September 6, 2018	Registered translator, Paralegal, Business Owner. Priorities include making safe communities, keeping taxes low, building Sheppard subway extension and adding more north-south buses, etc.
Michael Korzeniewski	660	2.45%	June 13, 2018	
Vincent Lee	597	2.22%	July 26, 2018	
Jude Coutinho	234	0.87%	July 17, 2018	
Jason Woychesko	90	0.33%	July 26, 2018	

=== Ward 23 Scarborough North ===
Candidate	Votes	Percentage	Registration Date	Notes
Cynthia Lai	5,589	27.02%	May 28, 2018	Endorsed by Toronto Sun.
Maggie Chi	4,137	20.00%	June 19, 2018	Worked as a constituency assistant to former Councillor Chin Lee, Ward 41, for 5 years. Endorsement and support from Chin Lee (former City Councillor), Glen De Baeremaeker (Deputy Mayor for Scarborough), Shaun Chen (Member of Parliament, Scarborough North), Tom Chang (President of the Brimley Forest Community Association), Gary Loughlin (President of the C.D Farqhuarson Community Association).
Felicia Samuel	3,702	17.89%	July 25, 2018	Former provincial NDP candidate. Endorsed by Toronto & York District Labour Council, Progress Toronto, Toronto Star, and NOW magazine.
Neethan Saba	2,808	13.57%	July 27, 2018	
James Chow	1,487	7.19%	May 16, 2018	
Ashwani Bhardwaj	1,259	6.09%	July 25, 2018	
Sheraz Khan	453	2.19%	July 27, 2018	
Dameon Halstead	391	1.89%	June 12, 2018	
Mahboob Mian	335	1.62%	July 9, 2018	
Sandeep Srivastava	273	1.32%	June 26, 2018	
Anthony Internicola	254	1.23%	May 8, 2018	

=== Ward 24 Scarborough—Guildwood ===
Candidate	Votes	Percentage	Registration Date	Notes
(incumbent)Paul Ainslie	15,131	66.82%	May 23, 2018	Councillor for former Ward 43 since 2006. Endorsed by Toronto Star, NOW magazine, and Toronto Sun.
Michelle Spencer	1,933	8.54%	September 7, 2018	
Priyanth Nallaratnam	1,896	8.37%	June 22, 2018	
Reddy Muttukuru	1,323	5.84%	July 11, 2018	
Sajid Saleh	841	3.71%	September 21, 2018	
Morian Washington	592	2.61%	July 26, 2018	
Keiosha Ross	405	1.79%	July 24, 2018	
Emery Warner	393	1.74%	July 26, 2018	
Etohan Evbagharu	132	0.58%	July 20, 2018	

=== Ward 25 Scarborough—Rouge Park ===
Candidate	Votes	Percentage	Registration Date	Notes
Jennifer McKelvie	11,624	40.21%	May 1, 2018	Council candidate in 2014. Environmental scientist and community organizer. First president of Renew Scarborough and past president of Centennial Community & Recreation Association. Endorsed by John McKay (Liberal MP for Scarborough-Guildwood), Raymond Cho (Progressive Conservative MPP for Scarborough North and past Ward 42 Councillor), Alvin Curling (former Liberal MPP for Scarborough-Rouge River), and Toronto Sun.
(incumbent)Neethan Shan	11,470	39.68%	July 9, 2018	Councillor for former Ward 42 since 2017. Endorsed by Toronto & York District Labour Council, Progress Toronto, Toronto Star. and NOW magazine.
Paul Cookson	1,897	6.56%	July 12, 2018	
Amanda Cain	831	2.87%	May 3, 2018	
Cheryl Lewis-Thurab	638	2.21%	May 10, 2018	
Daniel Cubellis	527	1.82%	May 4, 2018	
Reza Khoshdel	548	1.90%	May 4, 2018	Business executive and former political advisor & community organizer
Christopher Riley	456	1.58%	July 23, 2018	
Joseph Thomas	428	1.48%	July 25, 2018	
Jasper Ghori	337	1.17%	September 20, 2018	
Dave Madder	151	0.52%	July 10, 2018	

== Incumbents who did not run for re-election ==
- Justin Di Ciano, Councillor for former Ward 5 since 2014.
- Sarah Doucette, Councillor for former Ward 13 since 2010.
- Josh Colle, Councillor for former Ward 15 since 2010.
- Cesar Palacio, Councillor for former Ward 17 since 2003.
- David Shiner, Councillor for former Ward 24 since 2000.
- Janet Davis, Councillor for former Ward 31 since 2003.
- Mary-Margaret McMahon, Councillor for former Ward 32 since 2010.
- Jonathan Tsao, Councillor for former Ward 33 since 2018 (appointed by council to fill a vacancy).
- Glenn De Baeremaeker, Councillor for former Ward 38 since 2003.
- Migan Megardichian, Councillor for former Ward 41 since 2018 (appointed by council to fill a vacancy).
- Jim Hart, Councillor for former Ward 44 since 2017 (appointed by council to fill a vacancy).
