= Aiden Pleterski =

Canadian convicted fraudster (born c. 1999)

Aiden Pleterski (born c. 1999), also known as the Crypto King, is a Canadian convicted fraudster from Whitby, Ontario. He gained notoriety for an investment scheme involving cryptocurrency and foreign exchange trading in which he received more than $40 million from investors. In October 2026, he was convicted of fraud by a jury in Toronto.

== Investment scheme and bankruptcy ==
Pleterski operated an investment business through AP Private Equity Limited, promising investors substantial returns from cryptocurrency and foreign exchange trading. According to bankruptcy proceedings, he received approximately $41.5 million from investors but invested only 1.6 per cent of the funds. Millions were instead spent on luxury vehicles, private jet rentals and other personal expenses.

In August 2022, the Ontario Superior Court of Justice declared Pleterski and his company bankrupt and appointed Grant Thornton as trustee.

== Kidnapping ==
In December 2022, Pleterski was abducted in downtown Toronto and held captive for three days. His kidnappers assaulted and tortured him while demanding access to his cryptocurrency accounts. Several individuals were subsequently charged in connection with the kidnapping.

== Criminal proceedings ==
In May 2024, Pleterski was charged with fraud over $5,000 and laundering proceeds of crime following an investigation by the Durham Regional Police Service and the Ontario Securities Commission. The money laundering charge was subsequently withdrawn.

Pleterski pleaded not guilty and represented himself during his trial in the Ontario Superior Court of Justice. On 29 October 2026, a jury found him guilty of fraud over $5,000. His sentencing hearing was scheduled for 13 November 2026.
