= Toronto (City) v Ontario (Attorney General) =

2021 decision of the Supreme Court of Canada

- Supreme Court of Canada

Hearing: March 16, 2021 Judgment: October 1, 2021
- Citations: 2021 SCC 34
- Docket No.: 38921
- Prior history: 2018 ONSC 5151 (application granted); 2019 ONCA 732 (appeal allowed)
- Ruling: Appeal dismissed

Holding
- Law did not violate the freedom of expression of candidates and voters contrary to Section 2(b) of the Charter. Furthermore, unwritten constitutional principles cannot serve as the basis for invalidating legislation.

Court membership
- Chief Justice: Richard Wagner; Puisne Justices: Rosalie Abella, Michael Moldaver, Andromache Karakatsanis, Suzanne Côté, Russell Brown, Malcolm Rowe, Sheilah Martin, Nicholas Kasirer

Reasons given
- Majority: Wagner CJ and Brown J, joined by Moldaver, Côté, and Rowe JJ
- Dissent: Abella J, joined by Karakatsanis, Martin and Kasirer JJ

Toronto (City) v Ontario (Attorney General), 2021 SCC 34, is a landmark decision of the Supreme Court of Canada on freedom of expression and unwritten constitutional principles. By a 5–4 majority, the court held that the Government of Ontario's decision to reduce the size of the Toronto City Council in the middle of 2018 municipal election campaign did not violate either section 2(b) of the Canadian Charter of Rights and Freedoms or the unwritten principle of democracy. The court further held that unwritten constitutional principles could not serve as an independent basis to invalidate legislation.

In the Ontario general election held on June 7, 2018, Doug Ford's Progressive Conservative Party transitioned from being the official opposition to forming a majority government. Subsequently, on July 30, 2018, the Better Local Government Act, 2018 was introduced in the Legislative Assembly of Ontario, which amended the City of Toronto Act, 2006 changing the number of wards comprising Toronto City Council, reducing them from 47 to 25. The Better Local Government Act passed its third reading and received royal assent on August 14, 2018.

Following the enactment of this legislation, the City of Toronto, along with several candidates, challenged its constitutionality in the Ontario Superior Court of Justice. The court found that the provisions of the act infringed upon the section 2(b) rights of both candidates and electors. However, on appeal, the Court of Appeal for Ontario stayed the decision of the lower court, and a year later, it ruled that the provisions were constitutional. Subsequently, the City of Toronto appealed to the Supreme Court of Canada, which ultimately upheld the constitutionality of the provisions.

== Background ==
=== Constitutional law ===
Canada is a federation with powers divided between the federal government and the provincial governments. Section 92(8) of the Constitution Act, 1867, gives provinces exclusive jurisdiction over municipalities. Section 3 of the Canadian Charter of Rights and Freedoms guarantees Canadian citizens the right to vote in provincial and federal elections, but does not mention municipal elections.

The parties challenging the validity of Ontario's decision centred their arguments on section 2(b) of the Charter, which guarantees "freedom of thought, belief, opinion and expression, including freedom of the press and other media of communication".

=== Ward reconfiguration ===
In 1997, the Metro Toronto and the six municipalities within the Metro Toronto boundaries were amalgamated into a single enlarged municipality. The first municipal election elected a 57 person council, a mayor and two councillors from each of the city's 28 wards. Prior to the 2000 Toronto municipal election, the city was redistricted to increase the number of wards to 44 which each elected a single councillor, reducing the size of council from 57 to 45. These electoral boundaries remained in place until the 2018 municipal election.

Under the City of Toronto Act, 2006, the municipal government of Toronto reassessed the structure of the city's electoral districts, in a process formally titled the Toronto Ward Boundary Review. The review finished in November 2016. Following the review, the city council approved the report's recommendations and created three new wards, increasing the total from 44 to 47. A number of challenges to the ward boundary bylaw were made to the Ontario Municipal Board, as provided under section 124(8) of the City of Toronto Act. None of the challenges to the bylaw, including those that advocated for a 25 ward model were successful. (Note: Di Ciano v Toronto (City), 2017 CanLII 85757 (ON LPAT)) (Note: Graff v Toronto (City), 2017 CanLII 72942 (ON LPAT)) (Note: Natale v City of Toronto, 2018 ONSC 1475 (CanLII))

=== Better Local Government Act ===
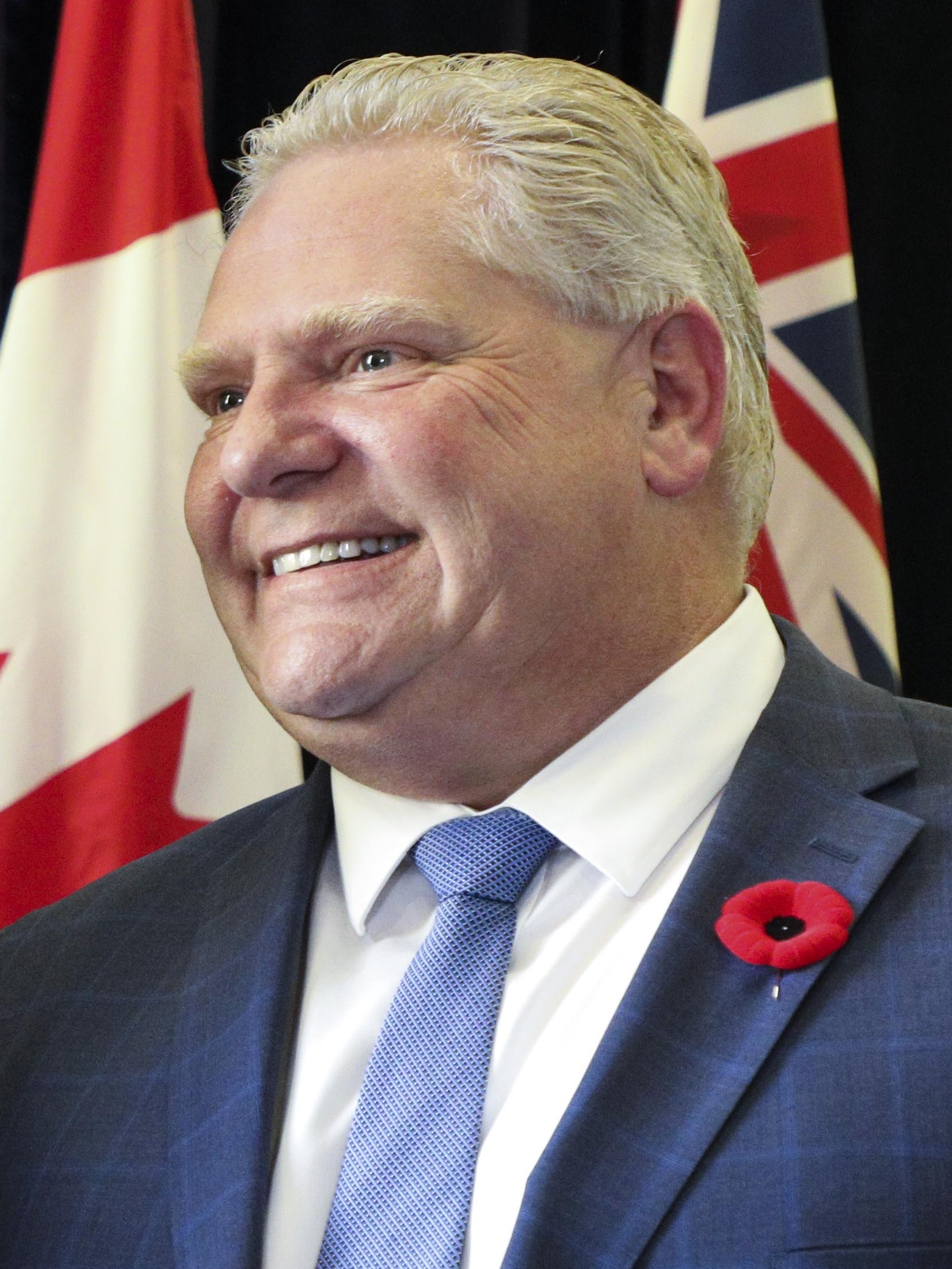
Premier of Ontario Doug Ford's Progressive Conservative government introduced the Better Local Government Act.

In the Ontario general election held on June 7, 2018, Doug Ford's Progressive Conservative Party transitioned from being the official opposition to forming a majority government. On July 27, 2018, Ford announced his intention to introduce legislation aimed at reducing the size of Toronto City Council. Subsequently, on July 30, 2018, the Ministry of Municipal Affairs and Housing Steve Clark, introduced the Better Local Government Act, 2018 to the Legislative Assembly of Ontario. The bill amended the City of Toronto Act, 2006 changing the number of wards comprising Toronto City Council, reducing the number of wards from 47 to 25. The Better Local Government Act passed its third reading, received Royal Assent, and came into force on August 14, 2018.

The Toronto municipal election process commenced on May 1, 2018, with the opening of nominations for council positions. Nominations closed on July 27, and more than 500 candidates declared their intention to run for office. (Note: Toronto (City) v Ontario (Attorney General), 2021 SCC 34 (CanLII), para 7.) Notably, the reduction of wards from 47 to 25 resulted in an increase in the average population size per ward, rising from 61,000 to 110,000 people. The Ford government did not notify opposition parties or the city before passing the statute. The Toronto election took place on October 22, 2018, operating under the newly established 25 ward structure. (Note: Toronto (City) v Ontario (Attorney General), 2021 SCC 34 (CanLII), para 10.)

== Ontario Superior Court of Justice ==
The City of Toronto, along with several candidates in the municipal election, filed a challenge against the constitutionality of the provisions of Better Local Government Act before the Ontario Superior Court of Justice. On September 9, 2018, Justice Edward P. Belobaba delivered a decision in which the court determined that the provisions of the Better Local Government Act, which reduced the number of wards from 47 to 25, were in violation of section 2(b) of the Charter. (Note: City of Toronto et al v Ontario (Attorney General), 2018 ONSC 5151 (CanLII), paras 84–86.)

In his ruling, Justice Belobaba held that the statute's provisions which came into force during the election, infringed on the section 2(b) rights of candidates; (Note: City of Toronto et al v Ontario (Attorney General), 2018 ONSC 5151 (CanLII), para 81.) and secondly by increasing the size of wards, the provisions infringed on electors right to effective representation. (Note: City of Toronto et al v Ontario (Attorney General), 2018 ONSC 5151 (CanLII), para 82.) The concept of effective representation, as defined by the Supreme Court of Canada in relation to section 3 of the Charter, that electors are not constitutionally entitled to "equality of voting power", but rather to have "legislative assemblies effectively represent the diversity of our social mosaic".

Following Belobaba's ruling, the Ford government initially indicated its intention to reintroduce the legislation and invoke the notwithstanding clause to reduce the size of the council. However, the Government of Ontario chose to appeal Belobaba's ruling, and on September 19, the Court of Appeal for Ontario granted a stay of proceedings pending the resolution of the appeal. (Note: Toronto (City) v Ontario (Attorney General), 2018 ONCA 761 (CanLII).) Since the stay ruling was successful, the Ontario government did not need to utilize the notwithstanding clause.

== Court of Appeal for Ontario ==
After the issuance of the stay, the Court of Appeal for Ontario took one year to reach a decision on the constitutionality of the provisions of the Better Local Government Act. During this period, the municipal election took place on October 22, operating under the 25-ward structure. (Note: Toronto (City) v Ontario (Attorney General), 2019 ONCA 732 (CanLII), para 4.) Then, on September 19, 2019, the Court of Appeal for Ontario, in a 3–2 decision, ruled that the Ford government was within its rights to reduce the size of the Toronto city council. (Note: Toronto (City) v Ontario (Attorney General), 2019 ONCA 732 (CanLII), para 8.)

Justice Bradley W. Miller's majority judgment concluded that the provisions reducing the number of wards during the election, as provided in the Better Local Government Act, did not contravene section 2(b) of the Charter. Section 2(b) prohibits governments from hindering individual expression but does not guarantee any specific method of expression. Since the Better Local Government Act did not obstruct candidates from expressing themselves but merely altered the avenues through which they could do so, it did not present a constitutional issue.

Starting in the 1980s, in decisions including Reference Re Secession of Quebec, the Supreme Court of Canada acknowledged that the Canadian constitution includes unwritten principles alongside its written text. Additionally, as part of its decision, the Court of Appeal affirmed that these unwritten constitutional principles could not stand alone as a basis for invalidating legislation. (Note: Toronto (City) v Ontario (Attorney General), 2019 ONCA 732 (CanLII), paras 86–89.)

Justices James C. MacPherson and Ian Nordheimer dissented, expressing the view that they would have ruled differently. They held that the Better Local Government Act, due to its implementation during the election, disrupted the electoral process and consequently interfered with the rights of both candidates and voters under section 2(b) of the Charter. (Note: Toronto (City) v Ontario (Attorney General), 2019 ONCA 732 (CanLII), paras 133–136.)

== Supreme Court of Canada ==
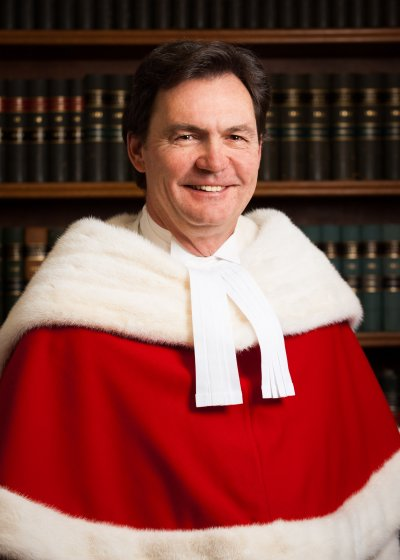
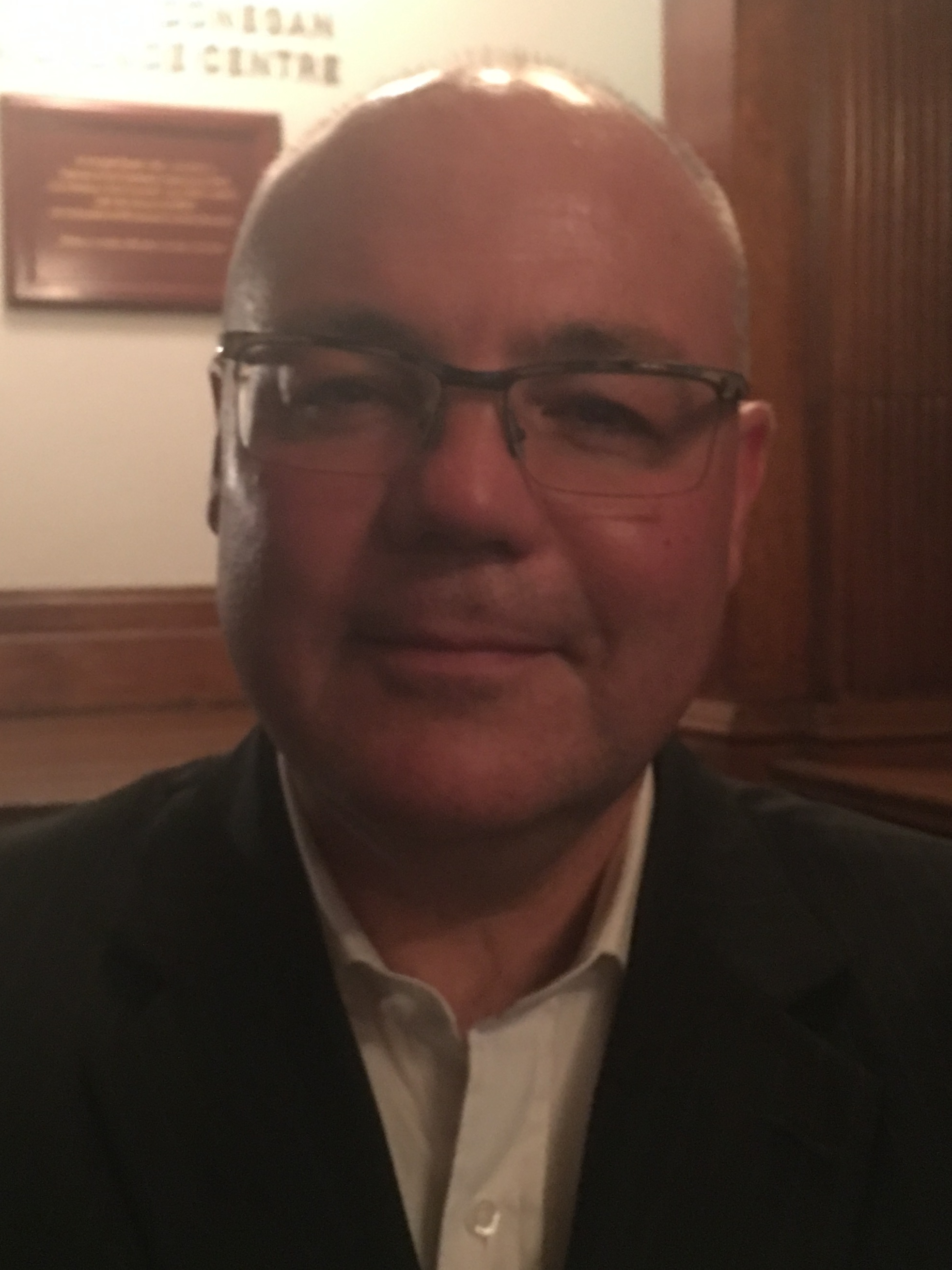
The majority opinion was authored by Chief Justice of Canada Richard Wagner (left) and Justice Russell Brown (right).

On October 1, 2021, by a 5–4 majority, the Supreme Court of Canada held that Ontario was permitted to reduce the size of Toronto City Council during the 2018 municipal election.

=== Majority opinion ===
The majority opinion, written by Justices Richard Wagner and Russell Brown, confirmed the court's prior holdings that freedom of expression under the Charter has both positive and negative dimensions, and that positive claims may be recognised in "exceptional and narrow" circumstances. (Note: Toronto (City) v Ontario (Attorney General), 2021 SCC 34 (CanLII), para 17.) Negative obligations require the government to refrain from acting or doing something, while positive obligations require the government to act in a certain way. (Note: Toronto (City) v Ontario (Attorney General), 2021 SCC 34 (CanLII), paras 16–20.) The court held that the city's freedom of expression claim was best characterised as positive, it then proceeded apply the legal framework for positive 2(b) claims identified in Baier v. Alberta and determined that the council cut did not meet the high bar necessary to establish a positive breach under section 2(b). (Note: Toronto (City) v Ontario (Attorney General), 2021 SCC 34 (CanLII), paras 40–42.)

Under the ruling, provinces may change the rules for municipal elections so long as such changes do not amount to "substantial interference" with free expression. In the majority's view, the Ontario statute did not prevent "meaningful expression", and was therefore consistent with section 2(b).

The majority affirming the opinion of the Court of Appeal, that unwritten constitutional principles cannot invalidate legislation on their own. Full legal force exists for unwritten constitutional provisions in the context of aiding interpretation of written provisions, (Note: Toronto (City) v Ontario (Attorney General), 2021 SCC 34 (CanLII), para 48.) where the unwritten provisions are used to fill gaps that allow the constitution to flow by implication, or otherwise fill gaps in important questions. (Note: Toronto (City) v Ontario (Attorney General), 2021 SCC 34 (CanLII), para 54.) The majority noted that unwritten constitutional principles may be used to interpret the constitution of Canada or to develop legal doctrine about it. (Note: Toronto (City) v Ontario (Attorney General), 2021 SCC 34 (CanLII), para 84.)

=== Dissenting opinion ===
The dissenting opinion, written by Justice Rosalie Abella, stated that the Better Local Government Act, because it was passed during the election, "breathed instability" into the election and thereby impinged on the freedom of expression. (Note: Toronto (City) v Ontario (Attorney General), 2021 SCC 34 (CanLII), para 147.) The dissent found that the negative claim under section 2(b) provided in Irwin Toy Ltd v Quebec (AG) was a more appropriate as the claim was about protecting the underlying freedom of expression for those free to participate in the electoral platform. (Note: Toronto (City) v Ontario (Attorney General), 2021 SCC 34 (CanLII), para 150.) Justice Abella also rejected the majority's findings on the role of unwritten constitutional principles, believing that unwritten principles may be used to invalidate legislation where a provision of a statute is fundamentally at odds with the Constitution's "internal architecture" or "basic constitutional structure". (Note: Toronto (City) v Ontario (Attorney General), 2021 SCC 34 (CanLII), para 170.)

== Sources ==
- Cameron, Jamie; Fox, Bailey (March 4, 2021). "Toronto's 2018 Municipal Election, Rights of Democratic Participation, and Section 2(b) of the Charter". Constitutional Forum. 30 (1): 1–18. doi:10.21991/cf29411. ISSN 1927-4165. S2CID 233777690. 2021 CanLIIDocs 814.
- Johnson, (Alyn) James (June 2, 2020). "The Toronto Municipal Election: Judicial Failure to Protect the Structure of the Canadian Constitution". Constitutional Forum. 29 (3): 1–9. doi:10.21991/cf29404. ISSN 1927-4165. S2CID 219930941. 2020 CanLIIDocs 3195.
- Kazmierski, Vincent (2023). ""Untethered": How the majority decision in Toronto (City) v Ontario tries (but fails) to break away from the Supreme Court of Canada's unwritten constitutional principle jurisprudence". Ottawa Law Review. 54 (2): 197–245. 2023 CanLIIDocs 3141.
- MacDonnell, Vanessa (2019). "Rethinking the Invisible Constitution: How Unwritten Constitutional Principles Shape Political Decision-Making". McGill Law Journal. 65 (2): 175–205. doi:10.7202/1075515ar. ISSN 0024-9041. 2019 CanLIIDocs 4487.
- Matheusik, Andre (2024). "Unfinished Business in Unwritten Justice: Unwritten Constitutional Principles After Toronto (City) v. Ontario (Attorney General)". Alberta Law Review. 61 (4): 933–962. 2024 CanLIIDocs 2271.
