= 2018 Toronto municipal election (47-ward model) =

Phase 1 of Toronto's 2018 municipal election, conducted under the 47-ward model

- October 22, 2018
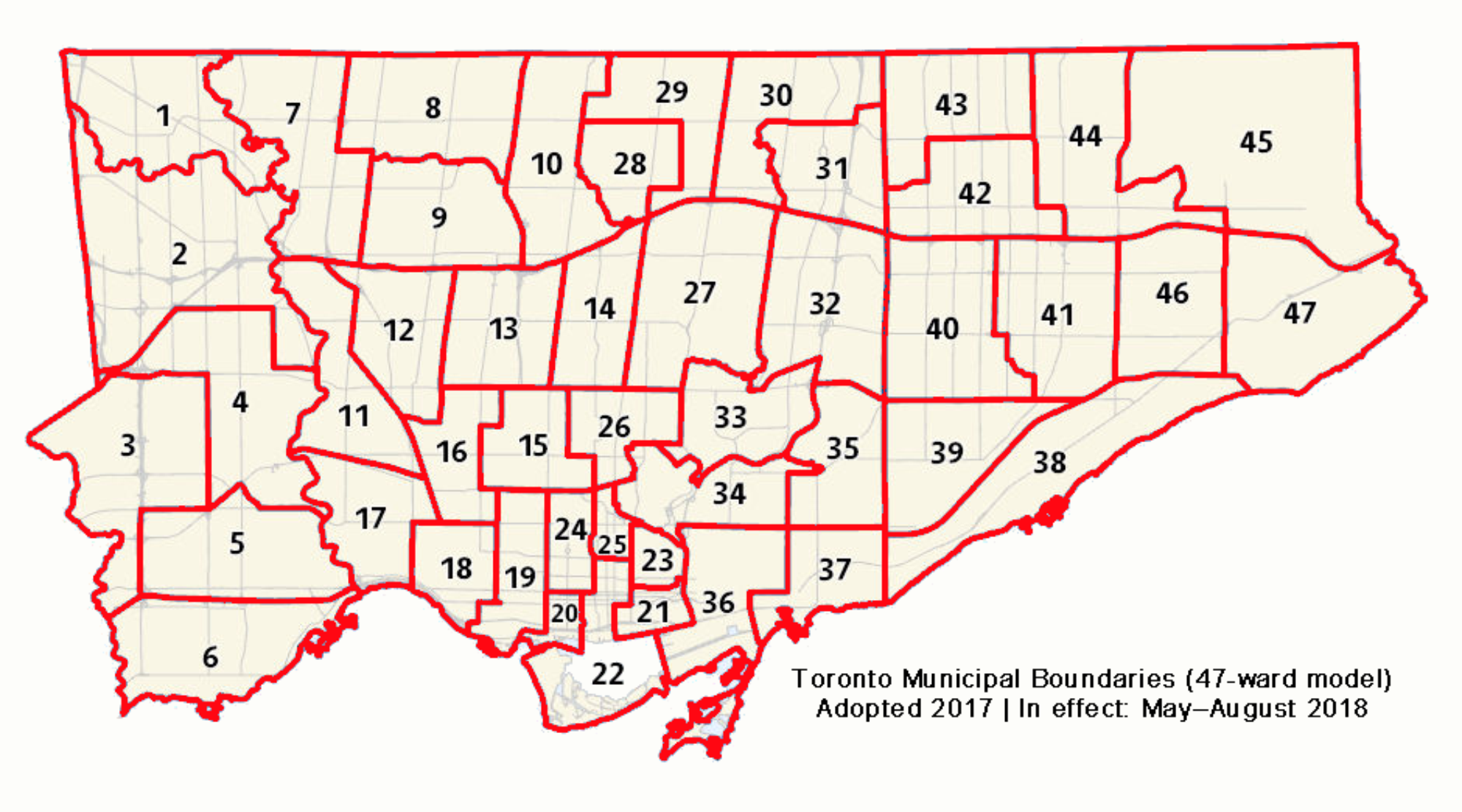
- Toronto Municipal Boundaries 2018 (47-ward)
Council before election
(see table)
Elected Council
Toronto City Council 2018–2022

The 2018 Toronto municipal election operated in two distinct phases. Phase 1 (47-ward model) was approved on appeal by the Ontario Municipal Board and was in effect from the beginning of the election through to August 14, 2018.

The province of Ontario ordered a change midway through the election cycle initiating a second phase (25-ward model) which ran from August through to election day. Phase 1 candidacy and campaign finance remain a matter of official public record, however it is the results of phase 2 that decided the final composition of the 2018 -2022 Toronto City Council.

Councillor and school trustee races which relied on ward boundaries as a condition were substantially affected. Mayoral races which covered the city as a whole were administrated differently in terms of polling methods, but were otherwise less affected.

== History ==
Toronto municipal ward boundaries were significantly modified in 2018, passing through three models (44-ward, 47-ward, and 25-ward). Ultimately, for the purposes of administering the 2018 election, the 25-ward structure was used and later upheld by the Supreme Court of Canada in 2021.

From 2014 to 2017, the City of Toronto engaged in a ward boundary review evaluating the city's previous 44-ward model.

Based on this, and in preparation for the 2018 municipal election, the City of Toronto added 3 new wards to create a 47-ward model. This model was in effect at the opening of the 2018 municipal election.

The 2018 Toronto municipal election ran from May 1, 2018, to October 22, 2018, and while underway the provincial government introduced the Better Local Government Act, 2018, S.O. 2018, c. 11 - Bill 5. The act was assented to on August 14, 2018.

The immediate effect of this act was to eliminate all previous ward models, and replace them with a 25-ward model designed to align with the provincial and federal ridings boundaries in effect at that time.

The timing of the boundary change was controversial, and the City of Toronto sued the province contesting the provisions' constitutionality. In the absence of an injunction, and with the pending threat of the province invoking the notwithstanding clause which would defeat any constitutional challenge, the election continued under the 25-ward model.

The nomination period originally scheduled to close on July 27, 2018, was extended to September 14, 2018. This allowed new candidates to run, and existing candidates to either withdraw or to reassign their candidacy to a different constituency.

In a judgment rendered October 1, 2021, the Supreme Court of Canada upheld the constitutionality of the provisions, and the 25-ward model remained in effect for the 2022 Toronto municipal election.

== Official ward materials (2018 47-ward model) ==
Ward Number	Census Data	47-Ward Model Map
1	Ward 01 Profile (47-Wards) - 2016 Census	Ward 1 Map
2	Ward 02 Profile (47-Wards) - 2016 Census	Ward 2 Map
3	Ward 03 Profile (47-Wards) - 2016 Census	Ward 3 Map
4	Ward 04 Profile (47-Wards) - 2016 Census	Ward 4 Map
5	Ward 05 Profile (47-Wards) - 2016 Census	Ward 5 Map
6	Ward 06 Profile (47-Wards) - 2016 Census	Ward 6 Map
7	Ward 07 Profile (47-Wards) - 2016 Census	Ward 7 Map
8	Ward 08 Profile (47-Wards) - 2016 Census	Ward 8 Map
9	Ward 09 Profile (47-Wards) - 2016 Census	Ward 9 Map
10	Ward 10 Profile (47-Wards) - 2016 Census	Ward 10 Map
11	Ward 11 Profile (47-Wards) - 2016 Census	Ward 11 Map
12	Ward 12 Profile (47-Wards) - 2016 Census	Ward 12 Map
13	Ward 13 Profile (47-Wards) - 2016 Census	Ward 13 Map
14	Ward 14 Profile (47-Wards) - 2016 Census	Ward 14 Map
15	Ward 15 Profile (47-Wards) - 2016 Census	Ward 15 Map
16	Ward 16 Profile (47-Wards) - 2016 Census	Ward 16 Map
17	Ward 17 Profile (47-Wards) - 2016 Census	Ward 17 Map
18	Ward 18 Profile (47-Wards) - 2016 Census	Ward 18 Map
19	Ward 19 Profile (47-Wards) - 2016 Census	Ward 19 Map
20	Ward 20 Profile (47-Wards) - 2016 Census	Ward 20 Map
21	Ward 21 Profile (47-Wards) - 2016 Census	Ward 21 Map
22	Ward 22 Profile (47-Wards) - 2016 Census	Ward 22 Map
23	Ward 23 Profile (47-Wards) - 2016 Census	Ward 23 Map
24	Ward 24 Profile (47-Wards) - 2016 Census	Ward 24 Map
25	Ward 25 Profile (47-Wards) - 2016 Census	Ward 25 Map
26	Ward 26 Profile (47-Wards) - 2016 Census	Ward 26 Map
27	Ward 27 Profile (47-Wards) - 2016 Census	Ward 27 Map
28	Ward 28 Profile (47-Wards) - 2016 Census	Ward 28 Map
29	Ward 29 Profile (47-Wards) - 2016 Census	Ward 29 Map
30	Ward 30 Profile (47-Wards) - 2016 Census	Ward 30 Map
31	Ward 31 Profile (47-Wards) - 2016 Census	Ward 31 Map
32	Ward 32 Profile (47-Wards) - 2016 Census	Ward 32 Map
33	Ward 33 Profile (47-Wards) - 2016 Census	Ward 33 Map
34	Ward 34 Profile (47-Wards) - 2016 Census	Ward 34 Map
35	Ward 35 Profile (47-Wards) - 2016 Census	Ward 35 Map
36	Ward 36 Profile (47-Wards) - 2016 Census	Ward 36 Map
37	Ward 37 Profile (47-Wards) - 2016 Census	Ward 37 Map
38	Ward 38 Profile (47-Wards) - 2016 Census	Ward 38 Map
39	Ward 39 Profile (47-Wards) - 2016 Census	Ward 39 Map
40	Ward 40 Profile (47-Wards) - 2016 Census	Ward 40 Map
41	Ward 41 Profile (47-Wards) - 2016 Census	Ward 41 Map
42	Ward 42 Profile (47-Wards) - 2016 Census	Ward 42 Map
43	Ward 43 Profile (47-Wards) - 2016 Census	Ward 43 Map
44	Ward 44 Profile (47-Wards) - 2016 Census	Ward 44 Map
45	Ward 45 Profile (47-Wards) - 2016 Census	Ward 45 Map
46	Ward 46 Profile (47-Wards) - 2016 Census	Ward 46 Map
47	Ward 47 Profile (47-Wards) - 2016 Census	Ward 47 Map
