= Ward 19 Beaches—East York =

Municipal council district in Toronto, Ontario, Canada

- Constituency for the Toronto City Council
- Location of Ward 19 in Toronto
- City: Toronto
- Population: 109,465 (2016)

Current constituency
- Created: 2018
- Councillor: Nate Erskine-Smith
- Community council: Toronto/East York
- Created from: Ward 31; Ward 32 (partial)
- First contested: 2018 election
- Last contested: 2026 election
- Ward profile: www.toronto.ca/city-government/data-research-maps/neighbourhoods-communities/ward-profiles/ward-19-beaches-east-york//

Ward 19 Beaches—East York is a municipal electoral division in Toronto, Ontario, Canada. It was last contested in 2026, with Nate Erskine-Smith elected as councillor.

== Boundaries ==
On August 14, 2018, the Government of Ontario redrew municipal boundaries via the Better Local Government Act, 2018, S.O. 2018, c. 11 - Bill 5. This means that the 25 provincial electoral districts and the 25 municipal wards in Toronto currently share the same geographic borders.

Defined in legislation as:

Consisting of that part of the City of Toronto described as follows: commencing at the intersection of Victoria Park Avenue with Sunrise Avenue; thence westerly along Sunrise Avenue and its production to the Don River East Branch; thence generally southwesterly along said branch to Taylor Creek; thence generally easterly along said creek to the northeasterly production of Coxwell Boulevard; thence southwesterly along said production and Coxwell Boulevard to Coxwell Avenue; thence southerly along said avenue to Lake Shore Boulevard East; thence in a straight line on a bearing of 210° to Ashbridge’s Bay; thence generally southerly along said bay to its southerly extremity; thence due south to the southerly limit of the City of Toronto; thence generally northeasterly along said limit to the southerly production of Victoria Park Avenue; thence northerly along said production and Victoria Park Avenue to the point of commencement.

== History ==
=== 2018 boundary adjustment ===
Toronto municipal ward boundaries were significantly modified in 2018 during the election campaign. Ultimately the new ward structure was used and later upheld by the Supreme Court of Canada in 2021.

== Councillors ==
Council term	Member	
Council term	Ward 31 Beaches—East York	Ward 32 Beaches—East York
2000–2003	Michael Prue (until 2001); Michael Tziretas (from 2001)	Sandra Bussin
2003–2006	Janet Davis	Sandra Bussin
2006–2010	Janet Davis	Sandra Bussin
2010–2014	Janet Davis	Mary-Margaret McMahon
2014–2018	Janet Davis	Mary-Margaret McMahon
	Ward 19 Beaches—East York	
2018–2022	Brad Bradford	
2022–2026	Brad Bradford	
2026–2030	Nate Erskine-Smith	

== Election results ==
2026 Toronto municipal election

Candidate	Votes	%	minus
Nate Erskine-Smith	21,472	46.75	–
Natalie Johnson	11,187	24.36	–
James Dann	5,461	11.89	–
Jennie Worden	3,723	8.11	14.58 ▼
Kevin Morrison	1,029	2.24	–
Adam Smith	899	1.96	4.90 ▼
Fatima Ibrahimi	511	1.11	–
Syeda Jaana Ali	466	1.01	–
Karsten Riedel	336	0.73	–
Mohammad Shabani	301	0.66	–
Devin Wilkins	213	0.46	–
Austin Vieira	205	0.45	–
Jeff Wahl	127	0.28	–

2022 Toronto municipal election, Ward 19 Beaches—East York
Candidate	Votes	Vote share
Brad Bradford	15,169	54.71%
Jennie Worden	6,291	22.69%
Adam Smith	1,902	6.86%
Steven Thompson	1,735	6.26%
Frank Marra	1,460	5.27%
Donna Braniff	703	2.53%
Sébastien Auger	469	1.69%
Total	27,729	100%
Source: City of Toronto

2018 Toronto municipal election, Ward 19 Beaches—East York
Candidate	Votes	Vote share
Brad Bradford	14,286	38.56%
Matthew Kellway	13,998	37.78%
Joshua Makuch	2,315	6.25%
Diane Dyson	1,612	4.35%
Veronica Stephen	1,257	2.82%
Valérie Maltais	929	2.51%
Adam Smith	708	1.91%
Brenda MacDonald	601	1.62%
Paul Bura	288	0.78%
David Del Grande	283	0.76%
Morley Rosenberg	248	0.67%
Frank Marra	142	0.38%
Donald Lamoreux	141	0.38%
Norval Bryant	89	0.24%
Dragan Cimesa	77	0.21%
Paul Murton	74	0.2%
Total	37,048	100%
Source: City of Toronto
