= Kevin Rupasinghe =

Kevin Rupasinghe is a Canadian engineer, community advocate, and municipal political candidate in Toronto, Ontario. He has been active in transportation, road-safety, housing, and urban-planning advocacy and has run multiple times for Toronto City Council in Ward 20 Scarborough Southwest.

== Career ==
Rupasinghe has worked as an engineer and has been involved in advocacy related to transportation and urban issues in Toronto.

He has been a long-time advocate for improving Canada’s democracy through voting reform, initially through work as Co-Chair of RaBIT (Ranked Ballot Initiative of Toronto), and more recently as Co-Chair and Executive Director of Unlock Democracy Canada

Rupasinghe has also been a long-time advocate for cycling safety and infrastructure in Toronto. During the COVID-19 pandemic, as Campaign Manager for Cycle Toronto he advocated for establishing expanded physical space for cyclists for both physical and mental health. He has also advocated for expanded cycling infrastructure in suburban communities, for both recreation and as a practical transportation alternative.

Beyond cycling safety, his public advocacy has included improved public transit and road safety in Scarborough, particularly improved transit and pedestrian safety in Scarborough.

== Municipal councillor candidate ==
In the 2022 and 2026 municipal elections and the 2023 by-election Rupasinghe has run for city Councillor in Ward 20, Scarborough Southwest.

His policy positions have included protecting existing affordable rental housing, additional forms of housing, greater use of city-owned land for nonprofit housing, and support for co-operative and rent-geared-to-income housing. Specific policies he has advocated for include allowing additional multiplex housing and neighbourhood retail in Scarborough Southwest, a broader mix of housing and transportation options, and linking land-use planning with transportation policy.

Electoral Record
Year	Election	Votes	Vote Share
2022	Toronto City Council, Ward 20 Scarborough Southwest	4,245	13.84%
2023	Ward 20 Scarborough Southwest by-election	3,485	22.5%
2026	Toronto City Council, Ward 20 Scarborough Southwest	Pending	

== Personal life ==
Rupasinghe is the son of Sri Lankan immigrants who worked in the automotive industry. He describes that his parents came to Canada seeking greater opportunities for their children. He studied engineering at the University of Toronto and later obtained a master's degree in Cities Engineering from the university.

He is a resident and a renter in Scarborough Southwest, where he lives with his partner.
