= York South—Weston =

York South—Weston may refer to:

- York South—Weston (federal electoral district), federal riding in Toronto, Ontario, Canada
- York South—Weston (provincial electoral district), provincial riding in Toronto, Ontario, Canada
- Ward 5 York South—Weston, municipal ward in Toronto, Ontario, Canada
