= Ward 18 Willowdale =

Municipal council district in Toronto, Ontario, Canada

- Constituency for the Toronto City Council
- Location of Ward 18 in Toronto
- City: Toronto
- Population: 118,800 (2016)

Current constituency
- Created: 2018
- Councillor: Lily Cheng
- Community council: North York
- Created from: Ward 10 (partial); Ward 23; Ward 24 (partial)
- First contested: 2018 election
- Last contested: 2026 election
- Ward profile: www.toronto.ca/ward-18-willowdale/

Ward 18 Willowdale is a municipal electoral division in Toronto, Ontario, Canada, that has been represented in the Toronto City Council since the 2018 municipal election. It was last contested in 2026, with Lily Cheng elected as the councillor for the current term.

== Boundaries ==
On August 14, 2018, the Government of Ontario redrew municipal boundaries via the Better Local Government Act, 2018, S.O. 2018, c. 11 - Bill 5. This means that the 25 provincial electoral districts and the 25 municipal wards in Toronto currently share the same geographic borders.

Defined in legislation as:

Consisting of that part of the City of Toronto described as follows: commencing at the intersection of the northerly limit of said city with Bayview Avenue; thence southerly along said avenue to Highway No. 401; thence generally southwesterly along said highway to the Don River West Branch; thence generally northwesterly along said branch to Bathurst Street; thence northerly along said street to the northerly limit of said city; thence easterly along said limit to the point of commencement.

== History ==
=== 2018 boundary adjustment ===
Toronto municipal ward boundaries were significantly modified in 2018 during the election campaign. Ultimately the new ward structure was used and later upheld by the Supreme Court of Canada in 2021.

The current ward is made up of the former Ward 23 Willowdale, part of the former Ward 24 Willowdale, and a small portion of the former Ward 10 York Centre.

=== 2018 municipal election ===
Ward 18 was first contested during the 2018 municipal election. Prior to the provincial government realignment, Ward 23 councillor John Filion announced plans to retire, and endorsed candidates in both of the new wards covering the previous district under the city's planned 47-ward system: Filion's executive assistant Markus O'Brien Fehr, and community organizer Lily Cheng.

Following the realignment, Filion rescinded his retirement plans and entered the race for the new ward 18, citing fears of voter confusion with the restructured wards; O'Brien Fehr dropped out while Cheng remained in the race for the larger ward alongside a number of other challengers. Filion was ultimately elected with 31.06 per cent of the vote.

== Geography ==
Ward 18 is part of the North York community council.

Willowdale's boundaries mirror its federal and provincial counterparts, being bounded by Steeles Avenue (the city limit) to the north, Bayview Avenue to the east, Highway 401 to the south until it crosses the Don River, the Don River west branch to the southwest (from Highway 401 to Bathurst Street), and Bathurst Street to the west otherwise.

== Councillors ==
Council term	Member	
Council term	Ward 9 North York Centre	
1997–2000	John Filion, Norman Gardner	
	Ward 23 Willowdale	Ward 24 Willowdale
2000–2003	John Filion	David Shiner
2003–2006	John Filion	David Shiner
2006–2010	John Filion	David Shiner
2010–2014	John Filion	David Shiner
2014–2018	John Filion	David Shiner
	Ward 18 Willowdale	
2018–2022	John Filion	
2022–2026	Lily Cheng	
2026–2030	Lily Cheng	

== Election results ==
2026 Toronto municipal election

Candidate	Votes	%	minus
Lily Cheng (X)	20,746	63.10	21.38 ▲
David Magazzinich	6,804	20.69	–
Ardeshir Zarezade	2,445	7.44	–
Hamid Shakeri	1,129	3.43	–
Nicole Daneshvar	1,115	3.39	–
Nathan Yusifov	639	1.94	–

2022 Toronto municipal election, Ward 18 Willowdale
Candidate	Vote	Vote share
Lily Cheng	8,337	41.72
Markus O'Brien Fehr	6,709	33.58
Daniel Lee	4,617	23.11
Elhan Shahban	318	1.59

2018 Toronto municipal election, Ward 18 Willowdale
Candidate	Votes	Vote share
John Filion	8,104	31.06%
Lily Cheng	5,149	19.74%
Sonny Cho	3,130	12.00%
David Mousavi	1,596	6.12%
Danny DeSantis	1,486	5.70%
Norman Gardner	1,476	5.67%
Sam Moini	1,289	4.94%
Saman Tabasi Nejad	1,189	4.56%
Winston Park	593	2.27%
Gerald Mak	545	2.09%
David Epstein	538	2.96%
Albert Kim	291	1.12%
Farah Aslani	187	0.72%
Andrew Herbst	162	0.62%
Hamid Shakeri	122	0.47%
Chung Jin Park	101	0.39%
Sam Mathi	66	0.25%
Marvin Honickman	61	0.23%
Total	26,085	100%
Source: City of Toronto

== See also ==
- Municipal elections in Canada
- Municipal government of Toronto
- List of Toronto municipal elections
