= Chemi Lhamo =

Tibetan-Canadian human rights activist

Chemi Lhamo is a Tibetan-Canadian human rights activist known for her advocacy on behalf of the Tibetan community. Born in South India, she has dedicated her efforts to promoting Tibetan rights and cultural preservation. As a speaker, Lhamo has addressed international forums, such as the Geneva Summit for Human Rights and Democracy, where she highlighted issues faced by Tibetans under Chinese governance. She has also spoken at the Oslo Freedom Forum. Lhamo protested the 2022 Winter Olympics that were held in Beijing, China.

== Early life and education ==
Lhamo was born in South India to Tibetan refugee parents. She later moved to Parkdale, Toronto, Canada, where she attended Parkdale Collegiate Institute and pursued higher education at the University of Toronto Scarborough, studying Neuroscience and Psychology. During her time at the university, she became involved in student governance and advocacy.

In 2019, Lhamo was elected President of the Scarborough Campus Students’ Union (SCSU) at the University of Toronto. Her election garnered significant attention due to her Tibetan heritage and activism, leading to some online harassment and threats, instigated by a Change.org petition calling for the nullification of the Presidential election result. Others stood in solidarity with her during this time.

== Organizations ==
Lhamo has been involved with various organizations, including serving on the board of the Canadian Tibetan Association of Ontario and Students for a Free Tibet Canada. She also represented Canada on the International Tibet Network's Steering Committee. She was a board member of the Tibetan Canadian Cultural Centre. She ran the Centre's Tibetan Youth Alliance Committee.

== Municipal electoral politics ==
In 2022, as one of the youngest candidates running in the election at age 26, Lhamo was a candidate for Toronto City Council in Ward 4 Parkdale—High Park . She narrowly lost to incumbent councillor Gord Perks, losing by under 1500 votes.

=== 2022 Election results ===
2022 Toronto municipal election, Ward 4 Parkdale—High Park
Candidate	Vote	%
Gord Perks (X)	11,149	35.48
Chemi Lhamo	9,919	31.56
Siri Agrell	8,077	25.70
Christopher Jurlik	827	2.63
Steve Yuen	827	2.63
Andrew Gorham	626	1.99
Source: Toronto Star
