= 2022 Toronto municipal election =

2022 municipal election in Toronto, Ontario, Canada

- October 24, 2022
- Mayoral election
Mayor before election
John Tory
Elected mayor
John Tory
- City councillor election
Speaker before election
Frances Nunziata
Speaker after election
Frances Nunziata

Municipal elections were held on October 24, 2022, to elect the mayor and 25 city councillors in Toronto, Ontario, Canada. In addition, school trustees were elected to the Toronto District School Board, Toronto Catholic District School Board, Conseil scolaire Viamonde and Conseil scolaire catholique MonAvenir. The election was held in conjunction with those held in other municipalities in the province of Ontario.

Candidate registration opened on May 2, 2022. The deadline for nominations was August 19, 2022, at 2 p.m.

== Mayoral election ==
31 candidates ran to be Mayor of Toronto including incumbent John Tory, seeking a third term, and prominent urbanist Gil Peñalosa.

In the 2022 election, John Tory was re-elected mayor. He resigned in 2023, triggering the 2023 Toronto mayoral by-election.

== Council elections ==
=== Incumbents not running for re-election and/or who resigned prior to the election ===
- Ana Bailão, councillor for Ward 9 Davenport, announced that she will not run again.
- Joe Cressy, councillor for Ward 10 Spadina—Fort York and its predecessor since 2014, resigned to become a vice-president of George Brown College. Joe Mihevc was appointed to fill the vacancy created by Cressy's resignation and has pledged to serve only for the remainder of Cressy's term and not be a candidate in the election.
- John Filion, councillor for Ward 18 Willowdale, is retiring after 40 years in municipal politics, first as a school trustee, then as a North York city councillor and as Toronto city councillor since amalgamation in 1998.
- Michael Ford, councillor for Ward 1 Etobicoke North, vacated his seat as a result of his election to the Legislative Assembly of Ontario in the June 2, 2022 Ontario general election. Rosemarie Bryan, a Salvation Army family counsellor, was appointed to fill the seat on June 25, on Ford's recommendation, but resigned the same day after it became known that she had shared anti-LGBTQ content on social media. Rose Milczyn was appointed in August to serve the remainder of Ford's term.
- Mike Layton, councillor for Ward 11 University—Rosedale, announced in July 2022 that he will not run for another term.
- Denzil Minnan-Wong, councillor for Ward 16 Don Valley East, announced that he will not run again.
- Kristyn Wong-Tam, councillor for Ward 13 Toronto Centre and its predecessor since 2010, resigned to run for the Ontario NDP in the 2022 Ontario general election. Robin Buxton Potts was appointed by council to fill the vacancy created by Wong-Tam's resignation and pledged to act as a caretaker councillor and not run in the election. She instead ran in the neighbouring district, Ward 11 University—Rosedale.

=== Ward 1 Etobicoke North ===
Incumbent city councillor Michael Ford was elected in 2018 with 42.26% of the vote. He was the candidate for the Progressive Conservative Party of Ontario in the 2022 Ontario general election in the York South—Weston riding and was elected to the Ontario legislature on June 2, 2022. Rose Milczyn was appointed by council to serve the remainder of Ford's term and is not running in the election.

Registered candidates

- Abraham Abbey
- Bill Britton
- Subhash Chand
- Vincent Crisanti, former city councillor for Ward 1 Etobicoke North (2010-2018)
- Michelle Garcia
- John Genser
- Avtar Minhas
- Dev Narang
- Christopher Noor
- Charles Ozzoude, endorsed by Progress Toronto and the Toronto & York Region Labour Council.
- Donald Pell
- Kristian Santos
- Mohit Sharma
- Keith Stephen

Results

Candidate	Vote	%
Vincent Crisanti	6,815	41.07
Avtar Minhas	3,409	20.54
Charles Ozzoude	1,023	6.16
Subhash Chand	934	5.63
Bill Britton	805	4.85
Michelle Garcia	620	3.74
Kristian Santos	613	3.69
Dev Narang	436	2.63
Ricardo Santos	421	2.54
Abraham Abbey	285	1.72
Keith Stephen	282	1.70
Christopher Noor	261	1.57
John Genser	198	1.19
Alistair Courtney	185	1.11
Mohit Sharma	185	1.11
Donald Pell	123	0.74

=== Ward 2 Etobicoke Centre ===
Incumbent city councillor Stephen Holyday was elected in 2018 with 38.58% of the vote. He has registered to run for re-election.

Registered candidates

- Catherine Habus
- Maryam Hashimi
- Stephen Holyday, incumbent city councillor
- Sam Raufi
- Thomas Yanuziello

Results

Candidate	Vote	%
Stephen Holyday (X)	18,559	72.28
Thomas Yanuziello	2,653	10.33
Catherine Habus	2,218	9.03
Maryam Hashimi	1,591	6.20
Sam Raufi	557	2.17

=== Ward 3 Etobicoke—Lakeshore ===
Incumbent city councillor Mark Grimes was elected in 2018 with 40.90% of the vote. He has registered to run for re-election.

Registered candidates

- Zeynel Ari, a Turkish pizza-maker who achieved fame for giving out free pizza to homeless residents of Toronto.
- Mark Grimes, incumbent city councillor. Endorsed by John Tory.
- Bonnie Hu
- Mary Markovic
- Amber Morley, a community health promoter who ran against Grimes in the 2018 election and placed second. Endorsed by Progress Toronto and the Toronto & York Region Labour Council.
- Marco Valle is a Sergeant in the Canadian Armed Forces. He has been a member of the CAF for over 18 years. He works and lives in Ward 3 where he is raising a young family.

Results

Candidate	Vote	%
Amber Morley	15,271	46.44
Mark Grimes (X)	13,258	40.32
Mary Markovic	2,625	7.98
Marco Valle	644	1.96
Bonnie Hu	618	1.88
Zeynel Ari	467	1.42

=== Ward 4 Parkdale—High Park ===
Incumbent city councillor Gord Perks was elected in 2018 with 44.55% of the vote. He has registered to run for re-election.

Registered candidates

- Siri Agrell, a former journalist who served as John Tory's director of strategic initiatives during his first term and was a senior political adviser to Kathleen Wynne
- Andrew Gorham
- Christopher Jurik
- Chemi Lhamo, Tibetan-Canadian activist
- Gord Perks, incumbent city councillor, endorsed by the Toronto & York Region Labour Council.
- Steve Yuen

Results

Candidate	Vote	%
Gord Perks (X)	11,149	35.48
Chemi Lhamo	9,919	31.56
Siri Agrell	8,077	25.70
Christopher Jurlik	827	2.63
Steve Yuen	827	2.63
Andrew Gorham	626	1.99

=== Ward 5 York South—Weston ===
Incumbent city councillor Frances Nunziata was elected in 2018 with 32.18% of the vote. She has registered to run for re-election.

Registered candidates

- Frances Nunziata, incumbent city councillor. Endorsed by John Tory.
- Chiara Padovani, an advocate for housing rights, housing advocate, and founding member of York South-Weston (YSW) Tenants. Padovani ran for election in York South-Weston in 2018 and placed third. Endorsed by Progress Toronto and the Toronto & York Region Labour Council.
- Gabriel Takang

Results

Candidate	Vote	%
Frances Nunziata (X)	10,077	47.61
Chiara Padovani	9,983	47.16
Gabriel Takang	1,107	5.23

=== Ward 6 York Centre ===
Incumbent city councillor James Pasternak was elected in 2018 with 47.61% of the vote. He has registered to run for re-election.

Registered candidates

- Mike Arkin
- Basil Canning
- James Pasternak, incumbent city councillor. Endorsed by John Tory.
- Hope Schrier

Results

Candidate	Vote	%
James Pasternak (X)	12,187	75.53
Mike Arkin	1,916	11.56
Hope Schrier	1,292	7.80
Basil Canning	1,179	7.11

=== Ward 7 Humber River—Black Creek ===
Incumbent city councillor Anthony Perruzza was elected in 2018 with 36.80% of the vote. He has registered to run for re-election.

Registered candidates

- Amanda Coombs
- Christopher Mammoliti, Toronto District School Board Vice-Chair and Trustee for Ward 4, Humber River - Black Creek and son of former city councillor Giorgio Mammoliti
- Anthony Perruzza, incumbent city councillor, endorsed by the Toronto & York Region Labour Council.

Results

Candidate	Vote	%
Anthony Perruzza (X)	8,707	61.30
Christopher Mammoliti	3,215	22.63
Amanda Coombs	2,282	16.07

=== Ward 8 Eglinton—Lawrence ===
Incumbent city councillor Mike Colle was elected in 2018 with 41.34% of the vote. He has registered to run for re-election.

Registered candidates

- Mike Colle, incumbent city councillor
- Philip Davidovits
- Domenico Maiolo
- Evan Sambasivam,
- Wendy Weston

Results

Candidate	Vote	%
Mike Colle (X)	17,109	70.31
Evan Sambasivam	3,447	14.17
Wendy Weston	1,990	8.18
Philip Davidovits	1,275	5.24
Domenico Maiolo	513	2.11

=== Ward 9 Davenport ===
Incumbent city councillor Ana Bailão was elected in 2018 with 83.62% of the vote. She is not running for re-election.

Registered candidates

- Alejandra Bravo, candidate for the New Democratic Party in Davenport for the 2021 Canadian federal election. Endorsed by Progress Toronto and the Toronto & York Region Labour Council.
- Simon Fogel
- Grant Gonzales, former President of the Davenport-Perth Neighbourhood and Community Health Centre. Co-Chair, Pride Toronto. Endorsed by John Tory.
- Mosea Houghron
- Shaker Jamal, a union representative for the United Steelworkers, co-organizer of BetterTO, a salon that ran quarterly events from 2017-2018 dedicated to discussing topical city issues, including housing, policing, and childcare.
- Steven Leca
- Jacob Maydansky
- Lazare Shorter
- Allie Spencer

Results

Candidate	Vote	%
Alejandra Bravo	17,009	70.72
Grant Gonzales	3,192	13.27
Shaker Jamal	1,414	5.88
Allie Spencer	882	3.67
Steven Leca	675	2.81
Simon Fogel	381	1.58
Jacob Maydansky	207	0.86
Mosea Houghron	151	0.63
Lazare Shorter	139	0.58

=== Ward 10 Spadina—Fort York ===
Joe Mihevc was appointed by city council on June 1, 2022 to fill the remainder of Joe Cressy's term. Cressy had been elected in 2018 with 55.06% of the vote. Cressy announced that he would not be seeking re-election and resigned effective April 30, 2022 to accept a position as vice-president of George Brown College. Mihevc pledged to act as a caretaker councillor and not run in the election.

Registered candidates

- Rocco Achampong, a lawyer who previously ran in the 2018 municipal elections, but withdrew to focus his efforts on a court case challenging the legality of the 2018 council cut.
- Rob Cooke
- April Engelberg, a lawyer who came in second place to Joe Cressy in 2018.
- Kyle Enslen
- Peter George
- Ausma Malik, the Director of Advocacy and Organizing at the Atkinson Foundation and former Toronto District School Board Trustee for Ward 10 (Trinity-Spadina) from 2014-2018. Cressy has endorsed Malik as a candidate. Endorsed by Progress Toronto and the Toronto & York Region Labour Council.
- Karlene Nation, former reporter with CTV News Toronto
- Laura-Maria Nicolareizi
- Arber Puci
- Igor Samardzic an urban planner, person with disability. Igor was the former Chair for the Toronto Transit Commissions Accessibility Committee.
- Stephanie Soltermann
- Andrei Zodian

Results

Candidate	Vote	%
Ausma Malik	8,033	36.55
April Engelberg	4,690	21.34
Rocco Achampong	1,906	8.67
Peter George	1,757	7.99
Igor Samardzic	1,686	7.67
Karlene Nation	1,001	4.55
Stephanie Soltermann	661	3.01
Arber Puci	603	2.74
Laura-Maria Nikolareizi	471	2.14
Kyle Enslen	439	2.00
Robb Cooke	434	1.97
Andrei Zodian	297	1.35

=== Ward 11 University—Rosedale ===
Incumbent city councillor Mike Layton was elected in 2018 with 69.56% of the vote. He is not running for re-election.

Registered candidates

- Axel Arvizu
- Michael Borrelli
- Robin Buxton Potts, city councillor (appointed) for Ward 13 Toronto Centre
- Norm Di Pasquale, candidate for the New Democratic Party in Spadina—Fort York for the 2021 Canadian federal election, Toronto Catholic District School Board Trustee for Ward 9. Endorsed by Progress Toronto and the Toronto & York Region Labour Council.
- David Fielder
- Adam Golding,
- Andrew Layman
- Peter Lovering
- Alison Pang
- Ann Rohmer, former broadcaster on CP24. Ended her campaign on August 28 due to "unforeseen family issues", but remained on the ballot. (Note: The last date for candidates to officially withdraw was the nomination deadline of August 19; therefore any candidate that discontinues or becomes unable to continue their campaign after that date will remain on the ballot.)
- Dianne Saxe, former Environmental Commissioner of Ontario (2015-2019), deputy leader of the Green Party of Ontario, Green Party candidate in the 2022 Ontario general election.
- Heather Shon
- Pierre Therrien
- Diana Yoon, candidate for the New Democratic Party in Spadina—Fort York for the 2019 Canadian federal election. Ended her campaign on August 29 to launch a city-wide "No Developer Money" pledge campaign, but remained on the ballot.

Results

Candidate	Vote	%
Dianne Saxe	8,614	35.37
Norm Di Pasquale	8,491	34.87
Robin Buxton Potts	2,156	8.85
Peter Lovering	1,321	5.42
Andrew Layman	683	2.80
Ann Rohmer	589	2.42
Adam Golding	481	1.98
Alison Pang	465	1.91
Axel Arvizu	463	1.90
Diana Yoon	415	1.70
Michael Borrelli	245	1.01
David Fielder	177	0.73
Pierre Therrien	169	0.69
Heather Shon	82	0.34

=== Ward 12 Toronto—St. Paul's ===
Incumbent city councillor Josh Matlow was elected in 2018 with 51.60% of the vote. He has registered to run for re-election.

Registered candidates

- Bryan Ashworth
- Antonio Corpuz
- Josh Matlow, incumbent city councillor
- Bob Murphy

Results

Candidate	Vote	%
Josh Matlow (X)	22,670	84.65
Bryan Ashworth	2,045	7.64
Bob Murphy	1,175	4.39
Antonio Courpuz	892	3.33

=== Ward 13 Toronto Centre ===
Robin Buxton Potts was appointed by city council on June 1, 2022 to fill the remainder of city councillor Kristyn Wong-Tam's term. Wong-Tam was elected in 2018 with 50.26% of the vote. They announced that they would not be seeking re-election and resigned effective May 4, 2022 to run in the provincial election. Buxton Potts pledged to act as a caretaker councillor and not run in the election. She ran in neighbouring Ward 11, instead.

Registered candidates

- Miguel Avila
- Colin Johnson
- Ryan Lester, Ended his campaign on October 3 for personal reasons, and endorsed Ward.
- Dan Cortez Manalo
- Cleveland Marshall
- Chris Moise, Toronto District School Board Trustee for Ward 10, University - Rosedale and Toronto Centre Endorsed by Progress Toronto and the Toronto & York Region Labour Council.
- Caroline Murphy
- Dev Ramsumair
- Nicki Ward, candidate for the Green Party of Ontario in Toronto Centre for the 2022 Ontario general election.

Results

Candidate	Vote	%
Chris Moise	10,457	48.48
Nicki Ward	3,940	18.27
Caroline Murphy	2,625	12.17
Colin Johnson	1,087	5.04
Dan Cortez Manalo	1,055	4.89
Miguel Avila	1,049	4.86
Ryan Lester	648	3.00
Cleveland Marshall	400	1.85
Dev Ramsumair	307	1.42

=== Ward 14 Toronto—Danforth ===
Incumbent city councillor Paula Fletcher was elected in 2018 with 42.27% of the vote. She has registered to run for re-election.

- Wali Abro
- John De Marco
- James Dyson
- Paula Fletcher, incumbent city councillor, endorsed by the Toronto & York Region Labour Council.
- Denise Walcott

Results

Candidate	Vote	%
Paula Fletcher (X)	20,305	74.02
Wali Abro	1,982	7.22
James Dyson	1,937	7.06
Denise Walcott	1,740	6.34
John De Marco	1,469	5.35

=== Ward 15 Don Valley West ===
Incumbent city councillor Jaye Robinson was elected in 2018 with 49.22% of the vote. She has registered to run for re-election.

Registered candidates

- David Ricci, endorsed by the Toronto & York Region Labour Council.
- Jaye Robinson, incumbent city councillor
- Sheena Sharp
- Gregory Vaz

Results

Candidate	Vote	%
Jaye Robinson (X)	16,142	74.22
Sheena Sharp	2,780	12.78
David Ricci	2,438	11.21
Gregory Vaz	389	1.79

Ward 16 Don Valley East

Incumbent city councillor Denzil Minnan-Wong was elected in 2018 with 43.33% of the vote. He is not running for re-election.

Registered candidates

- Samina Alim
- Walter Alvarez-Bardales, former Ontario Liberal Party candidate from York—Simcoe in the 2022 Ontario general election, civil servant, disability, human rights and Healthcare advocate
- George Asimakis
- Jon Burnside, former councillor for Don Valley West (2014-2018). Endorsed by John Tory.
- Stella Kargiannakis
- Stephen Ksiazek, President of Don Mills Residents Inc (DMRI), endorsed by the Toronto & York Region Labour Council.
- Colin Mahovlich
- Jonathan Mousley
- Nick Pachis
- Dmitre Popov
- John Simms

Results

Candidate	Vote	%
Jon Burnside	8,147	44.68
Stephen Ksiazek	3,778	20.72
Jonathan Mousley	1,282	7.03
Colin Mahovlich	1,059	5.81
Samina Alim	945	5.18
Stella Kargiannakis	700	3.84
Walter Alvarez-Bardales	616	3.38
Nick Pachis	579	3.18
Dimitre Popov	549	3.01
John Simms	410	2.25
George Asimakis	169	0.93

=== Ward 17 Don Valley North ===
Incumbent city councillor Shelley Carroll was elected in 2018 with 40.44% of the vote. She has registered to run for re-election.

Registered candidates

- Shelley Carroll, incumbent city councillor, endorsed by the Toronto & York Region Labour Council.
- Daryl Christoff
- Sandakie Ekanayake
- Justin Knott
- Angela Lindow
- Calvin Xu

Results

Candidate	Vote	%
Shelley Carroll (X)	12,897	71.79
Daryl Christoff	2,429	13.52
Calvin Xu	1,367	7.61
Angela Lindow	577	3.21
Justin Knott	409	2.28
Sandakie Ekanayake	286	1.59

=== Ward 18 Willowdale ===
Incumbent city councillor John Filion was elected in 2018 with 31.06% of the vote. He has represented Willowdale on North York and then Toronto city council since the 1990 municipal election. He is not running for re-election.

Registered candidates

- Lily Cheng, executive director of NeighbourLink North York and founder of the "North York Moms" Facebook group. In 2018, Cheng ran against Filion and placed second.
- Daniel Lee
- Markus O'Brien Fehr, a member of Filion's city hall staff. Filion has endorsed O'Brien Fehr as a candidate in 2022. Also endorsed by John Tory.
- Elham Shahban

Results

Candidate	Vote	%
Lily Cheng	8,337	41.72
Markus O'Brien Fehr	6,709	33.58
Daniel Lee	4,617	23.11
Elhan Shahban	318	1.59

=== Ward 19 Beaches—East York ===
Incumbent city councillor Brad Bradford was elected in 2018 with 38.56% of the vote. He has registered to run for re-election.

Registered candidates

- Sébastien Auget
- Brad Bradford, incumbent city councillor. Endorsed by John Tory.
- Donna Braniff
- Frank Marra
- Adam Smith
- Steven Thompson
- Jennie Worden

Results

Candidate	Vote	%
Brad Bradford (X)	15,169	54.71
Jennie Worden	6,291	22.69
Adam Smith	1,902	6.86
Steven Thompson	1,735	6.26
Frank Marra	1,460	5.27
Donna Braniff	703	2.53
Sébastien Auger	469	1.69

=== Ward 20 Scarborough Southwest ===
Incumbent city councillor Gary Crawford was elected in 2018 with 35.73% of the vote. He has registered to run for re-election.

Registered candidates

- Malik Ahmad
- Sharif Ahmed
- Lorenzo Berardinetti, former MPP (2003-2018) and city councillor (1997-2003).
- Gary Crawford, incumbent city councillor. Endorsed by John Tory.
- Corey David
- Parthi Kandavel, the Toronto District School Board Trustee for Ward 18, Scarborough Southwest.
- Philip Mills
- Kevin Rupasinghe, graduate of the University of Toronto's Master of Engineering in Cities Engineering and Management, Co-Chair of the Ranked Ballot Initiative of Toronto (RaBiT), board member of Unlock Democracy Canada, an electoral reform advocacy group, and former Cycle Toronto Senior Advocacy Manager Endorsed by Progress Toronto.

Results

Candidate	Vote	%
Gary Crawford (X)	8,216	35.07
Parthi Kandavel	6,936	29.61
Kevin Rupasinghe	3,208	13.69
Lorenzo Berardinetti	2,773	11.84
Malik Ahmad	709	3.03
Corey David	615	2.63
Sharif Ahmed	608	2.60
Philip Mills	363	1.55

=== Ward 21 Scarborough Centre ===
Incumbent city councillor Michael Thompson was elected in 2018 with 69.05% of the vote. He has registered to run for re-election.

Registered candidates

- Muhammad Ayub
- Paul Beatty
- Hansie Daniel
- Luigi Lisciandro
- Michael Thompson, incumbent city councillor
- Kiri Vadivelu

Results

Candidate	Vote	%
Michael Thompson (X)	9,977	55.25
Muhammad Ayub	2,478	13.72
Paul Beatty	1,857	10.28
Kiri Vadivelu	1,800	9.97
Hansie Daniel	1,375	7.61
Luigi Lisciandro	570	3.16

=== Ward 22 Scarborough—Agincourt ===
Incumbent city councillor Nick Mantas was elected in 2021 in a by-election with 26.98% of the vote. He has registered to run for re-election.

Registered candidates

- Anthony Internicola, a former People's Party of Canada candidate for the Scarborough—Agincourt riding in the 2019 Canadian federal election.
- Serge Khatchasourian
- Ronald Lin
- Antonios Mantas
- Nick Mantas, incumbent city councillor. Endorsed by John Tory.
- Bill Wu

Results

Candidate	Vote	%
Nick Mantas (X)	8,228	48.89
Bill Wu	3,153	18.73
Antonios Mantas	1,841	10.94
Roland Lin	1,549	9.20
Serge Khatchadourian	1,383	8.22
Anthony Internicola	677	4.02

=== Ward 23 Scarborough North ===
Incumbent city councillor Cynthia Lai was elected in 2018 with 27.02% of the vote. She was running for re-election but unexpectedly died on October 21, just three days before the vote.

Registered candidates

- Phillip Francis
- Virginia Jones
- Cynthia Lai, incumbent city councillor. Endorsed by John Tory. Died on October 21, but remained on the ballot; any votes cast for Lai were not counted. (Note: Under Ontario's Municipal Elections Act, in the event of the death of a candidate before voting day with at least two other candidates on the ballot, the election proceeds as if that candidate had not been nominated.)
- Jamaal Myers, a lawyer working for TD Bank, a transit advocate and member of Scarborough Transit Action, and member of the Scarborough Business Association Endorsed by Progress Toronto and the Toronto & York Region Labour Council.

Results

Candidate	Vote	%
Jamaal Myers	5,315	51.09
Phillip Francis	2,755	26.48
Virginia Jones	2,333	22.43

=== Ward 24 Scarborough—Guildwood ===
Incumbent city councillor Paul Ainslie was elected in 2018 with 66.82% of the vote. He has registered to run for re-election.

Registered candidates

- Paul Ainslie, incumbent city councillor
- Habiba Desai
- Vivian Parker
- Keiosha Ross

Results

Candidate	Vote	%
Paul Ainslie (X)	12,483	76.52
Vivian Parker	1,820	11.16
Habiba Desai	1,307	8.01
Keiosha Ross	703	4.31

=== Ward 25 Scarborough—Rouge Park ===
Incumbent city councillor Jennifer McKelvie was elected in 2018 with 40.21% of the vote. She has registered to run for re-election.

Registered candidates

- Ashan Fernando
- Jacinta Kanakaratnam
- Jennifer McKelvie, incumbent city councillor

Results

Candidate	Vote	%
Jennifer McKelvie (X)	14,168	72.28
Jacinta Kanakaratnam	3,449	17.60
Ashan Fernando	1,984	10.12

== Candidate endorsements ==
Incumbent mayor John Tory, the Toronto & York Region Labour Council, and advocacy groups More Neighbours Toronto and Progress Toronto have all made endorsements across multiple wards.

=== John Tory ===
- Mark Grimes, Ward 3 Etobicoke-Lakeshore
- Siri Agrell, Ward 4 Parkdale-High Park
- Frances Nunziata, Ward 5 York—South-Weston
- James Pasternak, Ward 6 York Centre
- Mike Colle, Ward 8 Eglinton-Lawrence
- Grant Gonzales, Ward 9, Davenport
- Jon Burnside, Ward 16, Don Valley East
- Markus O’Brien Fehr, Ward 18, Willowdale
- Brad Bradford, Ward 19, Beaches—East York
- Gary Crawford, Ward 20, Scarborough Southwest
- Nick Mantas, Ward 22, Scarborough Agincourt
- Cynthia Lai, Ward 23, Scarborough North

=== More Neighbours Toronto ===
- Thomas Yanuziello, Ward 2, Etobicoke Centre
- Amber Morley, Ward 3, Etobicoke-Lakeshore
- Evan Sambasivam, Ward 8, Eglinton–Lawrence
- Grant Gonzales, Ward 9, Davenport
- Igor Samardzic, Ward 10, Spadina—Fort York (with secondary endorsement of Ausma Malik)
- Chris Moise, Ward 13, Toronto Centre
- Sheena Sharp, Ward 15, Don Valley West (with secondary endorsement of David Ricci)
- Colin Mahovlich, Ward 16, Don Valley East
- Brad Bradford, Ward 19, Beaches—East York
- Kevin Rupasinghe, Ward 20, Scarborough Southwest
- Jamaal Myers, Ward 23, Scarborough North

=== Progress Toronto ===
Progress Toronto endorsements:

- Charles Ozzoude, Ward 1, Etobicoke North
- Amber Morley, Ward 3, Etobicoke-Lakeshore
- Chiara Padovani, Ward 5, York—South Weston
- Alejandra Bravo, Ward 9, Davenport
- Ausma Malik, Ward 10, Spadina—Fort York
- Norm Di Pasquale, Ward 11, University-Rosedale
- Chris Moise, Ward 13, Toronto Centre
- Kevin Rupasinghe, Ward 20, Scarborough Southwest
- Jamaal Myers, Ward 23, Scarborough North

=== Toronto & York Region Labour Council ===
- Charles Ozzoude, Ward 1, Etobicoke North
- Amber Morley, Ward 3, Etobicoke-Lakeshore
- Gord Perks, Ward 4, Parkdale—High Park
- Chiara Padovani, Ward 5, York—South Weston
- Anthony Perruzza, Ward 7, Humber River—Black Creek
- Alejandra Bravo, Ward 9, Davenport
- Ausma Malik, Ward 10, Spadina—Fort York
- Norm Di Pasquale, Ward 11, University-Rosedale
- Chris Moise, Ward 13, Toronto Centre
- Paula Fletcher, Ward 14, Toronto Danforth
- David Ricci, Ward 15, Don Valley West
- Stephen Ksiazek, Ward 16, Don Valley East
- Shelley Carroll, Ward 17, Don Valley North
- Jamaal Myers, Ward 23, Scarborough North

=== Toronto Community Bikeways Coalition ===
- Thomas Yanuziello, Ward 2, Etobicoke Centre
- Amber Morley, Ward 3, Etobicoke-Lakeshore
- Chiara Padovani, Ward 5, York—South Weston
- Alejandra Bravo, Ward 9, Davenport
- Markus O'Brien Fehr, Ward 18, Willowdale
- Kevin Rupasinghe, Ward 20, Scarborough Southwest
- Jamaal Myers, Ward 23, Scarborough North
- Gil Penalosa, Mayor

=== Toronto Star ===
- Charles Ozzoude, Ward 1, Etobicoke North
- Amber Morley, Ward 3, Etobicoke-Lakeshore
- Gord Perks, Ward 4, Parkdale-High Park
- Chiara Padovani, Ward 5, York South-Weston
- James Pasternak, Ward 6, York Centre
- Anthony Perruzza, Ward 7, Humber River-Black Creek
- Mike Colle, Ward 8, Eglinton-Lawrence
- Alejandra Bravo, Ward 9, Davenport
- Ausma Malik, Ward 10, Spadina-Fort York
- Robin Buxton Potts, Ward 11, University-Rosedale
- Josh Matlow, Ward 12, Toronto-St. Paul’s
- Chris Moise, Ward 13, Toronto Centre
- Paula Fletcher, Ward 14, Toronto-Danforth
- Jaye Robinson, Ward 15, Don Valley West
- Jon Burnside or Stephen Ksiazek, Ward 16, Don Valley East
- Shelley Carroll, Ward 17, Don Valley North
- Markus O’Brien Fehr, Ward 18, Willowdale
- Brad Bradford, Ward 19, Beaches-East York
- Kevin Rupasinghe, Ward 20, Scarborough Southwest
- Nick Mantas, Ward 22, Scarborough-Agincourt
- Jamaal Myers, Ward 23, Scarborough North
- Paul Ainslie, Ward 24, Scarborough-Guildwood
- Jennifer McKelvie, Ward 25, Scarborough-Rouge Park
- John Tory, Mayor
