= Diana Chan McNally =

Canadian activist and politician

Toronto City Councillor for Ward 4 Parkdale—High Park
- Incumbent
- Assumed office November 15, 2026
- Preceded by: Gord Perks

Personal details
- Born: 1982 or 1983 (age 43–44) Toronto, Ontario, Canada
- Website: www.dianachanmcnally.ca

Diana Chan McNally is a Canadian politician and housing activist who was elected to represent Ward 4 Parkdale—High Park on Toronto City Council in the 2026 Toronto municipal election. McNally serves as vice chair of the Planning and Housing Committee.

== Early life and education ==
McNally was born in Toronto, Ontario, and raised in the Etobicoke neighbourhood of Rexdale. In a profile published by The Local, McNally described how as a teen, she gave birth to a daughter and experienced a period of homelessness. She went to the Children's Aid Society, seeking help for the baby's arrival and care, and the child was eventually adopted by one of her teachers. To protect the privacy of her child, McNally initially provided different ages for herself and her child at the time of birth, however, she later corrected their ages.

McNally has a Bachelor of Fine Arts, a Master of Arts and a diploma in community work. She also completed coursework towards a Master of Education, however, did not complete the degree. Among other occupations, McNally has performed as a professional disc jockey.

== Career ==
Before entering politics, McNally worked in services for people experiencing homelessness, including at The Meeting Place drop-in centre and as a coordinator with the Toronto Drop-in Network. In 2021, she opposed the clearing of homeless encampments in Toronto parks and worked with the Toronto Drop-in Network and the Encampment Support Network on an alternative policy proposal.

In April 2025, Toronto City Council appointed her to its Housing Rights Advisory Committee. Councillor Lily Cheng described McNally as "a fierce advocate for the unhoused, and I think many of us appreciate the work she does to give voice to the people in our city who don’t have a voice."

McNally attributes her entry into social work from when she was teaching at Centennial College and her students, who she felt should have had refugee status, needed help. She supported them in finding work, finding housing and finding English classes. At the time of her appointment to the Housing Rights Advisory Committee, she explained: "It ended up being work I really liked doing, so I left teaching almost entirely and started over again as a frontline worker, which I think a lot of people thought was strange and a step down, but it’s what I love doing."

== Political career ==
=== 2026 Toronto municipal election ===
McNally announced her candidacy for Ward 4 Parkdale—High Park on Toronto City Council in May 2026, after incumbent Councillor Gord Perks announced that he would not seek re-election.

She was elected in the October 2026 municipal election, defeating runner-up Nadia Guerrera. She was appointed as vice chair of Planning and Housing by Mayor Olivia Chow in 2026.

== Electoral history ==
2026 Toronto municipal election Ward 4 Parkdale—High Park
Candidate	Votes	Vote share (%)
Diana Chan McNally	20,314	42.47
Nadia Guerrera	13,275	27.75
Adam Pham	6,346	13.27
Debbie King	2,949	6.16
Vanessa Raponi	1,762	3.68
Bridget Ogundipe	1,005	2.10
Holly Weber	882	1.84
Michael Corcoran	579	1.21
Steve Yuen	473	0.99
Andy Potega	251	0.52
Total	47,836	100
Source: City of Toronto
