= Nick Mantas =

Canadian politician and Toronto city councillor

Toronto City Councillor for Ward 22 Scarborough—Agincourt
- Incumbent
- Assumed office January 18, 2021
- Preceded by: Jim Karygiannis

Personal details
- Born: 1983 (age 42–43) Toronto, Ontario, Canada
- Education: York University (BA)
- Occupation: Politician, former policy advisor and civil servant
- Website: www.nickmantas.ca

Nick Mantas (born 1983) is a Canadian politician who has represented Ward 22 Scarborough—Agincourt on Toronto City Council since January 2021. He was first elected in a January 15, 2021 by-election following the departure of Jim Karygiannis, and was re-elected in 2022 and 2026.

== Background ==
Mantas earned a Bachelor of Arts degree in economics from York University. He previously worked as a federal constituency assistant, a policy advisor to the Senate of Canada and chief of staff to Toronto city councillor Jim Karygiannis.

In 2014, following Karygiannis's resignation from the House of Commons, Mantas sought the Liberal Party of Canada nomination in Scarborough—Agincourt.

== Political career ==
Mantas won the January 15, 2021 by-election for Ward 22 and was sworn in on January 18. He succeeded Karygiannis, for whom he had worked at both the federal and municipal levels. During the campaign, Mantas advocated traffic-calming measures near schools, improved community safety, an extension of Line 4 Sheppard into Scarborough and construction of the Bridletowne Hub.

Mantas was re-elected in the 2022 Toronto municipal election with 8,228 votes, or 48.89% of valid votes.

In the 2026 Toronto municipal election, Mantas won a third election to council, receiving 11,308 votes (40.74%) against nine challengers. His nearest opponent, Bill Chan, received 4,815 votes (17.35%). Although Mantas received more votes than in 2022, his share of the vote fell by 8.15 percentage points.

== Electoral results ==
2026 Toronto municipal election, Ward 22 Scarborough—Agincourt
Candidate	Votes	%
Nick Mantas (incumbent)	11,308	40.74
Bill Chan	4,815	17.35
Donny Morgan	3,283	11.83
Dan Lovell	2,529	9.11
Jackson Ho	1,660	5.98
Sindia Vijayarajan	1,170	4.22
Madhuri Azad	1,161	4.18
Serge Khatchadourian	1,106	3.98
Aaron Lal	452	1.63
Rakhee Kotecha	273	0.98
Total valid votes	27,757	100.00

2022 Toronto municipal election, Ward 22 Scarborough—Agincourt
Candidate	Votes	%
Nick Mantas (incumbent)	8,228	48.89
Bill Wu	3,153	18.73
Antonios Mantas	1,841	10.94
Roland Lin	1,549	9.20
Serge Khatchadourian	1,383	8.22
Anthony Internicola	677	4.02
Total valid votes	16,831	100.00

January 2021 Ward 22 Scarborough—Agincourt by-election
Candidate	Votes	%
Nick Mantas	3,261	26.98
Manna Wong	3,038	25.13
Christina Liu	1,760	14.56
Rocco Achampong	968	8.01
Tony Luk	848	7.02
Roland Lin	534	4.42
Jimmy Dagher	224	1.85
Serge Khatchadourian	224	1.85
Lily Fang	173	1.43
David Cheng	148	1.22
Paul Maguire	135	1.12
Varun Sriskanda	114	0.94
Renee Jagdeo	108	0.89
Yong Wu	108	0.89
Corey David	79	0.65
Walayat Khan	67	0.55
Sharif Ahmed	51	0.42
Jonathan Fon	42	0.35
Kevin Haynes	42	0.35
Kevin Clarke	38	0.31
Colin Williams	29	0.24
Itohan Evbagharu	26	0.22
Anthony Internicola	23	0.19
Daniel Trayes	17	0.14
Michael Julihen	14	0.12
Jeff Vitale	12	0.04
Rigaud Bastien	5	0.04

== See also ==
- Politics of Toronto
