= Supporting Ontario's Recovery and Municipal Elections Act, 2020 =

Legislation in the province of Ontario, Canada

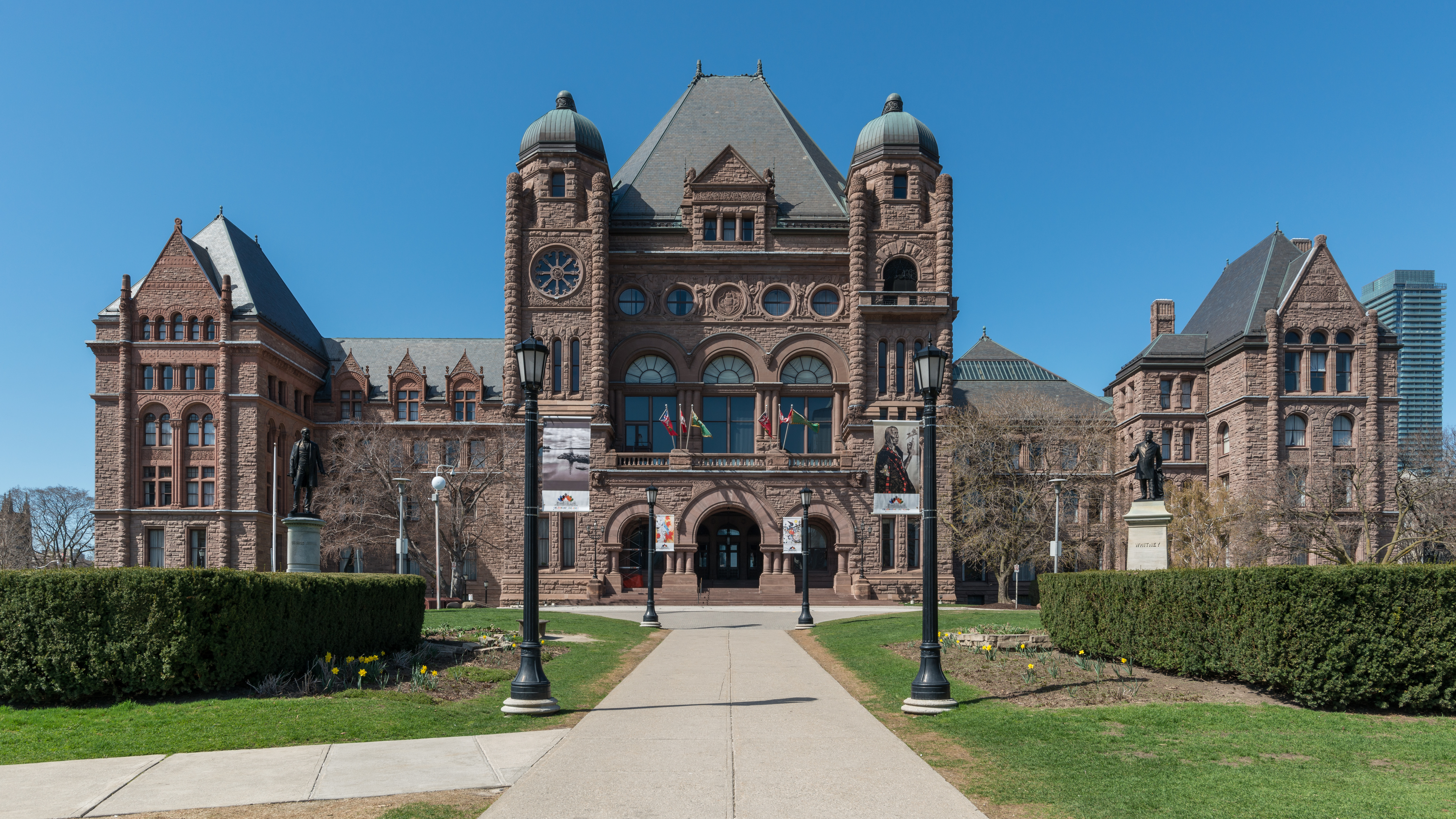

Legislative Assembly of Ontario
- Long title: An Act to enact the Supporting Ontario’s Recovery Act, 2020 respecting certain proceedings relating to the coronavirus (COVID-19), to amend the Municipal Elections Act, 1996 and to revoke a regulation
- Citation: S.O. 2020, c. 26, Sched. 1
- Royal assent: 20 November 2020

Legislative history
- Bill citation: Bill 218
- First reading: 20 October 2020
- Second reading: 27 October 2020
- Third reading: 16 November 2020
- Status: Current legislation

The Supporting Ontario's Recovery and Municipal Elections Act, 2020 (Bill 218, 2020; French: Loi visant à soutenir la relance en Ontario et sur les élections municipales) is a law in the province of Ontario that shielded organisations from lawsuits over their role in the spread of COVID-19 and banned city councils in the province from using ranked voting in municipal elections.

== Background ==
=== COVID-19 pandemic in Ontario ===
In June 2020, it was reported that Doug Ford's government was considering a law to give organisations immunity from lawsuits over the spread of COVID-19 in Ontario. The reports came as a number of class-action lawsuits had been launched in the province over deaths in long-term care homes. The lawsuits targeted a number of corporations who ran private long-term care in the province, including Revera Retirement Living, Sienna Senior Living, Chartwell Retirement Residences, and Responsive Group Inc.

=== Ranked ballots in Ontario ===
A number of city councils in Ontario had announced plans to introduce ranked ballots as their voting system for future municipal elections. The city of London had already made the change, with ranked ballots being used during the 2018 London, Ontario municipal election. In 2018, the cities of Kingston and Cambridge had held referendums on adopting ranked ballots for the 2022 municipal elections, with both referendums returning majorities in favour of the change. A number of other cities, including Barrie, were considering holding referendums of their own in 2022.

Most provincial political parties, including Ford's Progressive Conservative Party, use ranked ballots for their leadership elections.

== Legislative history ==
The bill was introduced to the Legislative Assembly in October 2020 by Attorney General Doug Downey. The bill was supported by the governing Progressive Conservative Party of Ontario and opposed by the Ontario New Democratic Party and the Green Party of Ontario.

It received royal assent from Lieutenant-Governor Elizabeth Dowdeswell on 20 November 2020.

== Reactions to the COVID-19 liability protection measures ==
The Canadian Broadcasting Corporation (CBC) named it as the most controversial law passed by Doug Ford's government in 2020.

=== Support ===
The Ontario Long Term Care Association applauded the bill, with CEO Donna Duncan stating that "Liability protection is a necessary measure to stabilize and renew Ontario's entire long-term care sector. Without it, many insurance companies will cease coverage, as they have already begun to do, putting homes across the province at risk and jeopardizing their expansion and renewal." The Insurance Bureau of Canada also supported the bill.

Doug Ford defended his government's actions over long-term care during the pandemic and the passage of the bill, stating that "I’ve been out here just hammering the people that have been negligent in long-term care. I’ve been on these guys like an 800-pound gorilla," and calling for critics of the bill to "talk to their lawyer rather than just read the headlines."

=== Opposition ===
The bill attracted heavy criticism, with relatives of victims of the pandemic arguing that it would make it impossible to hold the long-term care providers where many Ontarians died of COVID-19 accountable for those deaths.

The government also faced scrutiny over links between it and the for-profit long-term care industry. The Ontario Health Coalition announced that it would file a formal complaint to the province's Integrity Commissioner, J. David Wake, over the bill, calling for an investigation into donations made by the industry to the Progressive Conservative Party. The government was also accused of using the pandemic as a cover to pass omnibus legislation that would entrench the Progressive Conservative Party's interests, with Emmett Macfarlane, associate professor at the University of Waterloo, stating that "to the extent that they're using the pandemic as cover for these controversial initiatives, it just stinks to high heaven."

== Reactions to the Municipal Elections Act changes ==
The day after the government introduced the bill to the Legislative Assembly, a report from the Centre for Urban Policy and Local Governance at Western University was released finding that there had been a high level of public interest in the voting system in the 2018 London elections and that "London shows us that ranked balloting can be administered well, but that it takes extra effort and organization, at least the first time around."

=== Support ===
Steve Clark, Minister for Municipal Affairs and Housing, defended the government's move to ban ranked ballots, stating that it ensured consistency between municipal, provincial, and federal electoral systems, and would save municipalities money. He further stated that "our new proposed changes would bring predictability to municipal elections, at a time when Ontarians are focused on their health and safety."

=== Opposition ===
The move to ban ranked ballots was also met with heavy criticism, with critics stating that it undermined local democracy and came without consulting the public. Electoral reform advocacy group Fair Vote Canada released a statement saying that "too often, politicians will push for whatever system is in the best interest of their party, or to protect their own jobs. Today we see that since the Conservative Party supports first-past-the-post, every municipality in Ontario is now stuck with it."

John Tory, mayor of Toronto, and a number of Toronto city councillors denounced the move, as the city was considering switching to ranked ballots for future municipal elections. In Kingston, Bryan Paterson, the city's mayor, stated that "in 2018 Kingston voted in favour of moving to a system of ranked ballots in 2022, and I believe their decision should be respected." The London City Council voted almost unanimously to request that the province exempt the city from the ban.

== See also ==
- Ranked Ballot Initiative of Toronto
