= Ward 4 Parkdale—High Park =

Municipal council division in Toronto, Ontario, Canada

- Constituency for the Toronto City Council
- Location of Ward 4 in Toronto
- City: Toronto
- Population: 108,805 (2016)

Current constituency
- Created: 2018
- Councillor: Diana Chan McNally
- Community council: Toronto/East York
- Created from: Ward 13; Ward 14
- First contested: 2018 election
- Last contested: 2026 election
- Ward profile: www.toronto.ca/ward-4-parkdale-high-park/

Ward 4 Parkdale—High Park is a municipal electoral division in Toronto, Ontario, Canada. Starting with the 2018 municipal election the ward, under its current boundaries, is part of Toronto City Council. It was created from old Wards 13 and 14, as the province changed the boundaries in 2018 to have all City of Toronto electoral divisions match the provincial electoral districts' boundaries. The first councillor to represent the new ward was Gord Perks, the former Ward 14 councillor. He retired at the end of his term in 2026, making the ward an open seat for the 2026 Toronto municipal election. It was most recently contested in October 2026, with Diana Chan McNally elected as city councillor.

== Boundaries ==
On August 14, 2018, the Government of Ontario redrew municipal boundaries via the Better Local Government Act, 2018, S.O. 2018, c. 11 - Bill 5. This means that the 25 provincial districts and the 25 municipal wards in Toronto currently share the same geographic borders.

Defined in legislation as:

Consisting of that part of the City of Toronto described as follows: commencing at the intersection of the Humber River with the Canadian Pacifi c Railway; thence easterly along said railway to the GO Transit Railway situated easterly of Old Weston Road; thence southeasterly along said railway to Queen Street West; thence westerly along said street to DuB erin Street; thence southerly along said street to the F. G. Gardiner Expressway; thence westerly along said expressway to the southerly production of Spencer Avenue; thence southerly along said production to the southerly limit of said city; thence generally westerly along said limit to the southeasterly production of the Humber River; thence generally northwesterly along said production and the Humber River to the point of commencement.

== History ==
=== 2018 Boundary adjustments ===
In 2018, Toronto’s municipal ward boundaries underwent substantial revisions during the election cycle. The present ward configuration results from the consolidation of the western portion from former Ward 13 and the eastern portion from the former Ward 14. Although the election was initially planned to comprise 47 electoral divisions, provincial intervention during the election campaign period reduced the total to almost half that number. This restructuring compelled numerous incumbent councillors to compete against one another or to withdraw from the race. Even though there was a legal challenge to the boundaries, and a judge ruled the changes unconstitutional, the Court of Appeal for Ontario stayed that ruling on September 19, and the election went ahead with 25 electoral divisions. Ultimately the provincial boundaries structure was used and later upheld by the Supreme Court of Canada in 2021.

=== 2018 municipal election ===
Ward 4 was first contested during the 2018 municipal election. As mentioned in the previous section, incumbents had to campaign against fellow incumbents because the number of wards shrank. That was true in the new Ward 4. Old Ward 13 councillor Sarah Doucette decided to not run against the Ward 14 incumbent, Gord Perks. As the Ward 14 incumbent councillor, Perks served on council since 2006, and was elected with 44.55 per cent of the vote.

=== 2022 municipal election ===
Incumbent Gord Perks secured re-election in a competitive race against fellow progressive Chemi Lhamo.

=== 2026 municipal election ===
After two decades on Toronto City Council, councillor Perks announced in April 2026 that he would retire at the end of his term. Journalists, fellow councillors, and Mayor Olivia Chow viewed him as a leader of the council's left-wing and a key ally for her. The contest to succeed Perks seemed at first to mirror the 2006 election that brought him to office: two NDP leaning candidates, one backed by former Toronto mayor David Miller (Diana Chan McNally) and one by former Ontario MPP Cheri DiNovo (Debbie King). As in 2006, Miller chose the victor, Chan McNally, whom Perks also supported. King received backing from the Toronto & York Region Labour Council. Yet the expected tight race did not materialize by election night, as King finished a distant fourth. Chan McNally won by nearly 15 percentage points over the runner-up, former provincial Liberal candidate Nadia Guerrera.

== Councillors ==
Council term	Member	
Council term	High Park (Metro Council)	
1988–1991	Derwyn Shea	
1991–1994	Derwyn Shea	
1994–1997	David Miller	
	Ward 19 High Park	
1997–2000	David Miller, Chris Korwin-Kuczynski	
	Ward 13 Parkdale—High Park	Ward 14 Parkdale—High Park
2000–2003	David Miller	Chris Korwin-Kuczynski
2003–2006	Bill Saundercook	Sylvia Watson
2006–2010	Bill Saundercook	Gord Perks
2010–2014	Sarah Doucette	Gord Perks
2014–2018	Sarah Doucette	Gord Perks
	Ward 4 Parkdale—High Park	
2018–2022	Gord Perks	
2022–2026	Gord Perks	
2026–2030	Diana Chan McNally	

== Election results ==
2026 Toronto municipal election, Ward 4 Parkdale—High Park
Candidate	Votes	%
Diana Chan McNally	20,314	42.47
Nadia Guerrera	13,275	27.75
Adam Pham	6,346	13.27
Debbie King	2,949	6.16
Vanessa Raponi	1,762	3.68
Bridget Ogundipe	1,005	2.10
Holly Weber	882	1.84
Michael Corcoran	579	1.21
Steve Yuen	473	0.99
Andy Potega	251	0.52
Total	47,836	100%
Source: City of Toronto

2022 Toronto municipal election, Ward 4 Parkdale—High Park
Candidate	Vote	%
Gord Perks (X)	11,149	35.48
Chemi Lhamo	9,919	31.56
Siri Agrell	8,077	25.70
Christopher Jurlik	827	2.63
Steve Yuen	827	2.63
Andrew Gorham	626	1.99

2018 Toronto municipal election, Ward 4 Parkdale—High Park
Candidate	Vote	%
Gord Perks	16,887	44.55%
David Ginsberg	8,181	21.58%
Kalsang Dolma	5,352	14.12%
Evan Tummillo	2,367	6.24%
Valerie Grdisa	1,771	4.67%
Nick Pavlov	874	2.31%
Taras Kulish	868	2.29%
Alex Perez	686	1.81%
José Vera	544	1.44%
Mercy Okalowe	373	0.98%
Total	37,903	100%
Source: City of Toronto

== See also ==
- Municipal elections in Canada
- Municipal government of Toronto
- List of Toronto municipal elections
