= Dave Meslin =

Community organizer and activist in Toronto

David Meslin is a Canadian community organizer and activist. Originally living and active in Toronto he's now living in Grey Highlands, Ontario.

== Life and career ==
Meslin is the founder of the Toronto Public Space Committee, Cycle Toronto (formerly the Toronto Cyclists Union), City Idol, the Ranked Ballot Initiative of Toronto, and the magazine Spacing.

At TedxToronto 2010, he presented "The antidote to apathy", a TED (conference) talk on barriers that keep us from taking part in our communities. He delivered the convocation address at Carleton College in 2012.

In 2019, Meslin published the book Teardown: Rebuilding Democracy from the Ground Up. A review in the Literary Review of Canada by David Berlin described the book as "a primer best suited for the activist at heart."

In 2022, he was the subject of the documentary The Billboard Squad focusing on a 15 year campaign against illegal billboard signs in Toronto ‘corporate garbage’.

In 2024 he hosted Unrigged, a six-episode TVO documentary series produced by Moi & Dave, based on Teardown which profiled various new innovations in democratic politics and governance. The series received a Canadian Screen Award nomination for Best Political News Program or Series at the 13th Canadian Screen Awards in 2025.
