= Gord Perks =

Canadian politician (born 1963)

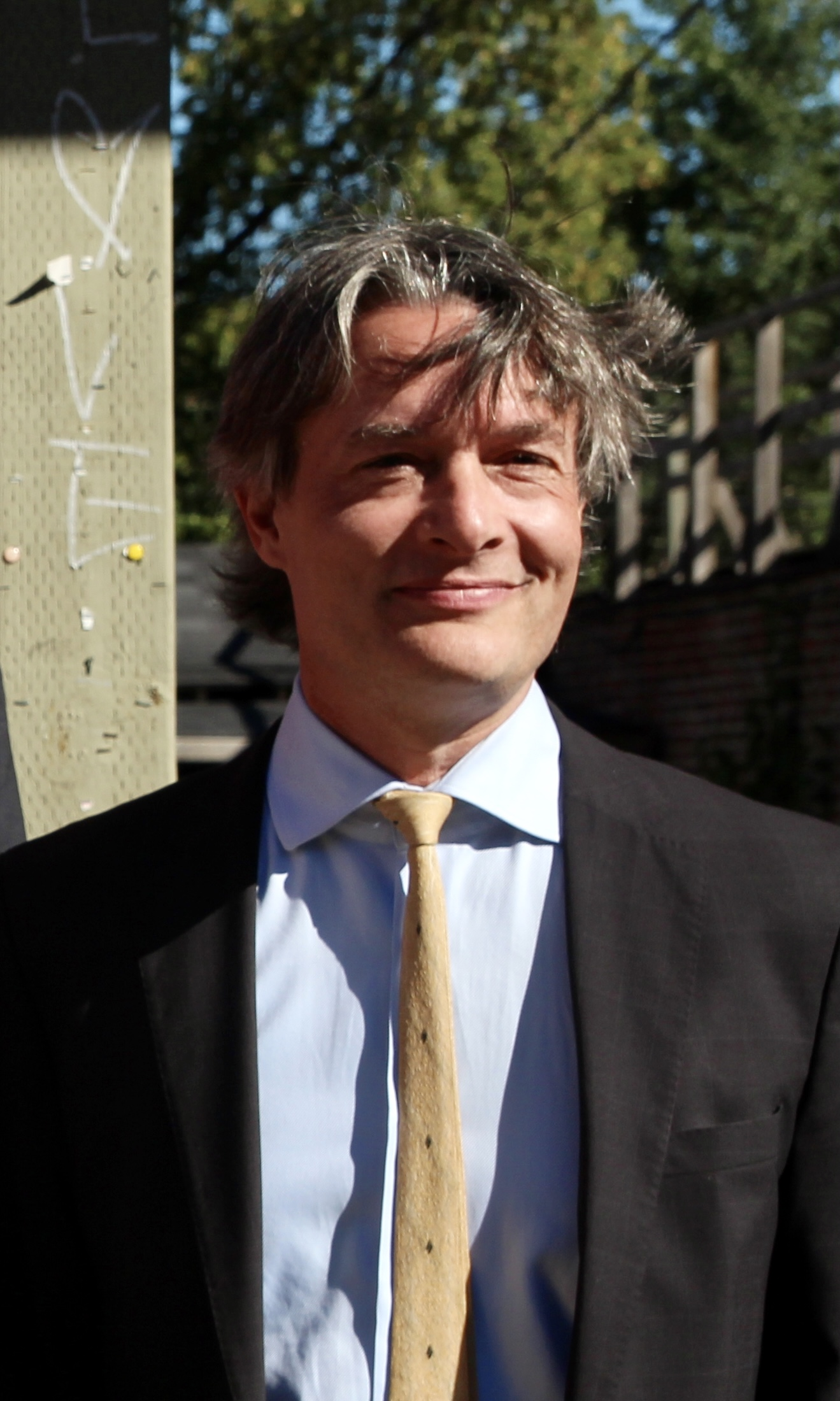
- Perks in 2014

Toronto City Councillor
- In office December 1, 2018 – November 15, 2026
- Succeeded by: Diana Chan McNally
- Constituency: Ward 4 Parkdale—High Park
- In office December 1, 2006 – December 1, 2018
- Preceded by: Sylvia Watson
- Succeeded by: Ward amalgamated
- Constituency: Ward 14 Parkdale–High Park

Chair of the Toronto Planning and Housing Committee
- In office August 10, 2023 – November 14, 2026
- Mayor: Olivia Chow
- Preceded by: Brad Bradford
- Succeeded by: Nate Erskine-Smith

Personal details
- Born: October 7, 1963 (age 63)
- Party: New Democratic
- Spouse: Sarah Winterton
- Children: 3
- Occupation: Politician

Gordon Perks (born October 7, 1963) is a Canadian former municipal politician and environmental activist who served on Toronto City Council from 2006 to 2026. First elected for Ward 14 Parkdale—High Park in 2006, he represented Ward 4 Parkdale—High Park from 2018 until the end of his term on November 15, 2026. In April 2026, Perks announced that he would not seek re-election for a sixth term.

== Career ==
Perks has worked for a number of environmental organizations. He was a writer for Pollution Probe from 1987 to 1989 and a "Pulp and Paper" campaigner at Greenpeace Canada from 1989 to 1993. He was executive director of the Better Transportation Coalition from 1994 to 1996 and was a senior campaigner at the Toronto Environmental Alliance from 1997 until 2006, with a focus on waste reduction and public transit. He also works as an adjunct professor at the Environmental Studies department of the University of Toronto.

Perks was the focus of province-wide attention when he disrupted Ontario Premier David Peterson's press conference launching the 1990 provincial election campaign. As Peterson announced the election and began to make a statement as to why his government should be re-elected, Perks appeared with a briefcase chained to his wrist containing a tape recorder playing a recording of environmental promises made by Peterson, in an act of criticism of the Liberal government's environmental record. Perks also heckled Peterson with a bullhorn. Greenpeace and other groups inspired by Perks' disruption plagued Peterson's campaign appearances.

=== Writer ===
Perks has written and co-authored a number of publications including The Green Consumer Guide (1989), Waste Less Now (1987) and Oil Drop (1989). In addition, he has written articles for Alternatives magazine and he wrote an environmental column for Torstar-owned Eye Weekly newspaper from 2003 to 2011.

=== Political career ===
During the 2006 federal election, Perks was the New Democratic Party candidate for the riding of Davenport. He placed second, losing to the incumbent member of Parliament Mario Silva of the Liberal Party.

Perks later ran for city councillor a few months later during the 2006 Toronto municipal election in Ward 14 Parkdale—High Park. He ran against a slate of 13 other candidates and was endorsed by Mayor David Miller. He won the race by a seven percent margin over his nearest rival.

Perks ran again in the 2010 municipal election. He received an endorsement from the Toronto Star and was once again re-elected in Ward 14, over nine other candidates.

In his second term, Perks was named chair of the Toronto and East York Community Council.

In the 2014 municipal election, Perks was re-elected for a third term. He once again was endorsed by The Star.

Electoral boundaries were adjusted for the 2018 municipal election, and Perks' Ward 14 was amalgamated with Ward 13, the other Parkdale—High Park electoral district. Incumbent Ward 13 councillor Sarah Doucette opted not to run in the newly amalgamated riding and instead endorsed Perks, who ran and won in the newly created Ward 4 Parkdale—High Park.

Perks was re-elected for a fifth time in the 2022 municipal election. He received an endorsement from the Toronto Star and fended off a challenge from Chemi Lhamo, a local community activist, and Siri Agrell, a journalist and former staffer in Mayor John Tory's office.

After the election of Olivia Chow in the 2023 mayoral by-election, Perks was appointed by Chow as Chair of the Planning and Housing Committee, one of four Toronto City Council standing committees. The day before nominations opened for the 2026 Toronto municipal election, he announced that he would not seek a sixth term in Ward 4, Parkdale—High Park. His council term ended on November 15, 2026, after 20 years in office.

== Electoral record ==
Results of the 2022 Toronto municipal election, Ward 4 Parkdale—High Park

Candidate	Vote	%
Gord Perks (X)	11,149	35.48
Chemi Lhamo	9,919	31.56
Siri Agrell	8,077	25.70
Christopher Jurlik	827	2.63
Steve Yuen	827	2.63
Andrew Gorham	626	1.99

2018 Toronto municipal election, Ward 4 Parkdale—High Park
Candidate	Votes	Vote share
Gord Perks	16,887	44.55%
David Ginsberg	8,181	21.58%
Kalsang Dolma	5,352	14.12%
Evan Tummillo	2,367	6.24%
Valerie Grdisa	1,771	4.67%
Nick Pavlov	874	2.31%
Taras Kulish	868	2.29%
Alex Perez	686	1.81%
José Vera	544	1.44%
Mercy Okalowe	373	0.98%
Total	37,903	100%
Source: City of Toronto

2014 Toronto election, Ward 14 Parkdale—High Park
Candidate	Votes	%
Gord Perks	11,630	55.03%
Charmain Emerson	6,811	32.23%
Gus Koutoumanos	1,107	5.24%
Tim Kirby	968	4.58%
Andreas Marouchos	363	1.72%
Jimmy Talpa	254	1.20%
Total	21,133	100%

2010 Toronto election, Ward 14 Parkdale—High Park
Candidate	Votes	%
Gord Perks	8,542	51.8
Ryan Hobson	2,798	17.0
Michael Erickson	2,434	14.8
7 other candidates (Note: Candidates who polled less than 1,000 votes in 2010 election were (in descending order): Bill Vrebosch, Cullen Simpson, Gus Koutoumanos, Barry Hubick, Jules-José Kerlinger, István Tar, Jimmy Talpa)	2,713	16.5
Total	16,487	100

2006 Toronto election, Ward 14 Parkdale—High Park
Candidate	Votes	%
Gord Perks	3,816	30.1
Rowena Santos	2,978	23.5
Ted Lojko	1,872	14.8
John Colautti	1,645	13.0
10 other candidates (Note: Candidates who polled less than 1,000 votes in 2006 election were (in descending order): David White, Tom Freeman, Walter Jarsky, Dilorece South, Anthony Quinn, Beverly Bernardo, David Hanna, Matthew Vezina, Jimmy Talpa, Barry Hubick)	2,350	18.6
Total	12,661	100

2006 Canadian federal election: Davenport
Party	Candidate	Votes	%	±%
Liberal	Mario Silva	20,172	51.87	+1.18
New Democratic	Gord Perks	12,681	32.61	-1.52
Conservative	Theresa Rodrigues	4,202	10.80	+1.50
Green	Mark O'Brien	1,440	3.70	-0.48
Communist	Miguel Figueroa	172	0.44	+0.03
Canadian Action	Wendy Forrest	122	0.31	+0.02
Marxist–Leninist	Sarah Thompson	103	0.26	+0.02
Total valid votes		38,892	100.00	
Total rejected ballots		240	0.61	-0.22
Turnout		39,132	60.61	+7.72
Elections Canada, Riding of Davenport, Electoral District 35015.
