= Chiara Padovani =

Canadian politician

- Padovani in 2018

Toronto City Councillor for Ward 5 York South—Weston
- Incumbent
- Assumed office November 15, 2026
- Preceded by: Frances Nunziata

Personal details
- Party: Independent (Note: In Ontario, municipal politicians are elected on a non-partisan basis.)
- Occupation: Social worker; politician
- Website: www.chiarapadovani.ca

Chiara Padovani is a Canadian social worker and politician who was elected to represent Ward 5 York South–Weston on Toronto City Council in the 2026 Toronto municipal election.

Prior to her election to council, she was a social worker and tenants' rights activist, running in Ward 5 in the 2018 and 2022 elections, losing both times to longtime incumbent Frances Nunziata. In 2022, Padovani came within just 94 votes of winning, and in 2026 defeated her rival by nearly 6,000 votes, unseating the longest-serving incumbent in Toronto City Council history.

== Career ==
Padovani worked for a women's rights organization in Ecuador and human rights organizations in Argentina. She later worked as a coordinator at the North York Harvest Food Bank. The York South-Weston Tenant Union (YSWTU) emerged during her 2018 city council campaign, initially organizing tenants' associations in two buildings facing above-guideline rent increases. By August 2020, the union had formed tenants' associations in 13 high-rise buildings and approximately a dozen low-rise buildings and other accommodations in the Mount Dennis area.

In 2022, Padovani ran again for City Councillor for York South-Weston, this time coming within just 94 votes of the incumbent Nunziata. The City's Integrity Commissioner investigated Nunziata's campaign and its July 2024 report found the councillor's chief of staff wrongfully used the contact information of over 8,000 residents, breaching the council's code of conduct. The Commissioner did not rule the councillor herself was guilty, but Padovani went on social media to accuse Nunziata's campaign of cheating.

In 2023, Padovani acted as co-chair of the YSWTU as it embarked on a historic rent strike. Hundreds of units in two buildings – 33 King Street and 22 John Street in Weston – withheld their rent payments in protest against their landlord's Above Guideline Rent Increases (AGIs). The rent strike ended after sixteen months with a collectively-bargained agreement between the tenant union and the landlord, Dream Unlimited. A separate rent strike followed at 1440 and 1442 Lawrence Avenue West against their landlord's lack of maintenance which tenants claimed endangered their health and safety, to the point that Canada Post refused to deliver mail to the building because of pest infestations. In those buildings, Padovani led a 72-hour sit-in which occupied the property manager's office and the apartment of an elderly woman who was wrongfully evicted. That eviction was blocked and later the landlord was compelled to fix maintenance issues in hundreds of units.

In 2025, Padovani received the Broadbent Institute's Jack Layton Progress Prize for her work defending tenants and advocating for affordable housing. She accepted the award alongside members of the York South-Weston Tenant Union at the institute's Progress Summit in Ottawa.

In May 2026, Padovani officially announced her intention to run a third time for Toronto City Council. The campaign was largely seen as a rematch between the longest-sitting elected official in the City of Toronto's history, Frances Nunziata, and an up-and-coming tenant rights activist and organizer. In the October 2026 Municipal Election, Padovani won by a wide margin, gaining nearly twice as many votes as her rival Nunziata. Padovani attributed her success to the years of ground work and organizing from her previous campaigns and tenant organizing, as well as her ability to motivate renters to vote.

== Electoral record ==
| Year | Ward / Position | Votes | % | Main opponent(s) |
|---|---|---|---|---|
| 2018 | Ward 5 York South–Weston | 5,358 | 20.47% | Frances Nunziata (8,425 – 32.18%) Frank Di Giorgio (5,674 – 21.67%) |
| 2022 | Ward 5 York South–Weston | 9,983 | 47.16% | Frances Nunziata (10,077 – 47.61%) |
| 2026 | Ward 5 York South–Weston | 13,407 | 39.10% | Daniel Di Giorgio (9,818 – 28.63%) Frances Nunziata (7,441 – 21.70%) |
