= Moi & Dave =

Canadian media company

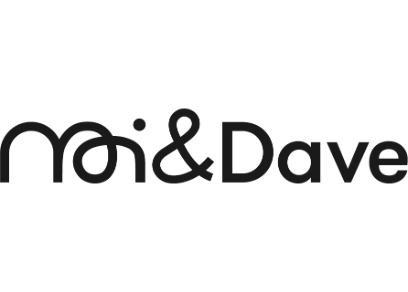
- Industry: Film, television
- Founded: 2020
- Founder: David Baeta, Simon Madore
- Headquarters: Toronto, Canada
- Website: www.moi-dave.ca

Moi & Dave is a Canadian media production company based in Toronto, Ontario, Canada. Founded by David Baeta and Simon Madore, the company specializes in creating content for television and digital platforms.

== History ==
The company was founded in Toronto by David Baeta and Simon Madore in 2020. It specializes in French-language productions for Franco-Ontarian and Canadian audiences. The founders believe it is important, as a linguistic minority, to be able to tell stories that reflect their own experiences. Their productions allow viewers, particularly non-English speakers, Francophiles, and those from Francophone communities outside Quebec, to see themselves on screen.

David Baeta and Simon Madore met during VOLT, broadcast on TFO. Over the years, they talked about founding Moi & Dave, until it came to fruition in 2020. The company's purpose is to address social issues without a moralizing tone and often with humor, to reflect all Canadian communities in their diversity. For example, the new youth series Bana Konesans explores the Afro-Francophone heritage of young Canadians.

In 2024, Moi & Dave was selected by the DOC Institute for the national Business Leap program, designed to support the growth of Canadian production companies.

During its first 5 years, Moi & Dave produced 13 original projects, ranging from documentaries to variety and fiction programs, generating $12.5 million in revenue. The company also produces feature films.

Before co-founding Moi & Dave, Madore worked as a director and Baeta as a producer, both at Machine Gum Productions. This Toronto-based audiovisual company produced dozens of programs such as Balade, Ma Vie made in Canada, Ciao Plastique, and Couleurs locales from 2014 to 2020.

David Baeta is president of the Alliance des producteurs francophones du Canada (APFC). His commitment is also reflected in M•E•D•I•A•, a coalition that promotes equity, diversity, and inclusion for French-speaking professionals from underrepresented communities in the media industry. Simon Madore is a member of Raccord, which represents French-speaking filmmakers in minority communities across Canada.

== Programming ==
=== Television ===
Title	Description	Broadcasting year	Seasons	Episodes	Network
COMBO	Youth series of short videos exploring the mixed heritage of our traditions, objects, and everyday rituals.	2026	1	50	SRC
Bana Konesans	Youth series about Afro-Francophone heritage. It addresses the history of Black Canadians and the challenges of anti-racist education. The characters Sarah-Akéli and Max awaken the magic of objects from Africa in their grandmother's basement.	2025	1	5	TFO
Les Zultras	In this series blending documentary and comedy, viewers follow Z, a teenager who launches her own channel to showcase engaged youth.	2024	1	16	TFO
Unrigged	A program that explores the inner workings of democracy, featuring political strategist and community organizer Dave Meslin. He examines democracy's obstacles and blind spots, and highlights simple solutions to help address democratic dysfunctions.	2024	1	6	TVO
Zik	A television music program described as off-the-wall by L’Express and hosted by Mehdi Cayenne.	2022	2	20	TFO
Improtéine Expose	Humorous review of the year. In 2025, the program aired across the country, either on December 31st or January 1st. This fourth edition revisited recent events across Canada to explore what derailed 2025. Guests included Alain Rayes and Georges Laraque. From 2022 to 2024, the comedians addressed topics as diverse as foreign interference, Doug Ford's decisions and car theft.	2022–2025	4	4	Ici TOU.TV

=== Film ===
Title	Description	Released in	Distributor
Niagara Inc.	Documentary exploring tourism in this iconic location, as well as its complex social, economic, and environmental realities.	2026	SRC
Le Dernier Canadien français	Documentary produced for Radio-Canada, in which viewers follow the comedian Pascal Justin Boyer's quest for identity regarding his belonging to the Canadian Francophonie. The English-subtitled version was acquired by CBC Gem in 2025.	2024	SRC
Papier mâché	Short film.	2024	Several film festivals, including Venezia Shorts (Italy) and Rendez-vous Québec Cinéma.
Miroir Miroir	A portrait of Canada since the 1970s and an invitation to rethink the country.	2022	SRC
Vote Pop	Documentary about politics.	2021	SRC

== Awards and nominations ==
In addition to its selection for the Business Leap program, the company has the support of institutional organizations such as the Canada Media Fund, the Bell Fund, Telefilm Canada, Ontario Creates, and Canadian Heritage.

=== Nominations ===
- 2025: Gémeaux Awards (40th edition): Les Zultras: Best Youth Program or Series: Entertainment or Magazine (David Baeta, Renée de Sousa, Simon Madore); Best Youth Animation (episode "Eco-Anxiety"); Best Youth Program Direction (episode "Responsibility").
- 2024: Gémeaux Awards (39th edition): Le dernier Canadien français: Best Documentary; Best Animation: Documentary or Public Affairs; Improtéine Expose 2024: Best Variety Program.
- 2024: Canadian Screen Awards: Unrigged: Best Political News Program or Series.
- 2023: Gémeaux Awards (38th edition): Zik: Best Youth Program or Series: Entertainment or Magazine; Best Youth Program Direction: Entertainment or Magazine (episode 8); Best Youth Animation (episode 2); Improtéine Expose 2023: Best Comedy Performance.
- 2022: Attagirl (by Screen Australia, the British Film Institute, and Telefilm Canada): Medium Beluga: Production prize.
- 2022: Gémeaux Awards (37th edition): Improtéine Expose 2022: Best Comedy Performance.
