= Bill Saundercook =

Former Toronto city councillor

Toronto City Councillor for (Ward 13) Parkdale–High Park
- In office December 1, 2003 – November 30, 2010
- Preceded by: David Miller
- Succeeded by: Sarah Doucette

Chair of Government Management Committee
- In office September 28, 2009 – November 30, 2010
- Preceded by: Gloria Lindsay Luby
- Succeeded by: Paul Ainslie

Toronto City Councillor for York Humber (Ward 27) with Frances Nunziata
- In office January 1, 1998 – November 30, 2000
- Preceded by: New ward
- Succeeded by: Riding abolished

Alderman, City of York for Ward 8
- In office December 1, 1985 – December 31, 1997
- Succeeded by: Ward abolished

Personal details
- Occupation: Teacher

Bill Saundercook was a city councillor in Toronto, Ontario, Canada for Ward 13 Parkdale-High Park. A teacher from a family of teachers, Saundercook holds a B.Ed., M.A. and M.Ed.

== Background ==
Saundercook grew up in York. He came from a family of nine children. Before entering politics he taught school and coached a local hockey team.

== Politics ==
=== Alderman, City of York ===
He was first elected as an alderman for the City of York in 1985 defeating a 13-year incumbent. In the 1994 election he supported incumbent mayor Fergy Brown. When the election was won by Frances Nunziata, he was clear in his opposition to her. He said, "I'll be damned if I want to carry her ... (Nunziata's) learning curve will have to be a slope that I couldn't ski."

In 1996, he ran for the Liberal nomination in the provincial riding of York South. A by-election was being held to replace former premier Bob Rae who had resigned subsequent to his defeat in 1995. While Saundercook had the backing of Metro Chairman Alan Tonks he was criticized for backing a provincial Conservative candidate in the 1994 election. The nomination was won by Gerard Kennedy who went on to win the by-election.

=== Toronto City Council ===
When York was amalgamated with Toronto and four other suburban municipalities in 1997, Saundercook was elected to Toronto City Council in a ward shared with Nunziata.

He was elected the first Chair of the York Community Council and member of the Strategic Policies and Priorities Committee. Saundercook was then elected by other councillors as the Chair of the Works Committee.

On city council, he pioneered a number of important environmental initiatives. He introduced Toronto's biodegradable compost bag policy which banned plastic bags from being used for curbside compost pickup. He also spearheaded the city's Sewer-Use By-Law, which was lauded by environmentalists as one of the most stringent in North America.

This redistricting prior to the 2000 municipal election placed Saundercook in a difficult position. His new ward was claimed by Frances Nunziata, another popular fellow councillor and the former Mayor of York. Saundercook's home and core area of support fell into the new ward of Parkdale-High Park, also home to fellow councillor and future Mayor of Toronto David Miller. Saundercook was narrowly defeated in this election.

=== In between terms ===
A federal election also overlapped the 2000 municipal elections. Immediately following his municipal defeat, Saundercook took a core of his campaign team to assist his long-time friend and fellow Liberal Alan Tonks in his successful federal election campaign

Saundercook returned to being a teacher after these elections, but remained active in the Liberal Party.

=== Toronto City Council, II ===
Miller launched a successful campaign for Mayor of Toronto in the 2003 municipal election, leaving his council seat open.

Saundercook was returned to city council after a close and fragmented race.

On the 2003-2006 Council, Saundercook supported many of Mayor Miller's initiatives such as killing the bridge to the island airport, and banning pesticides. He also opposed a pay increase for city council, supported the hiring of more police officers and supported a contract extension for former Toronto Police Chief Julian Fantino. He was Mayor Miller's designate on both the Toronto Hydro Board of Directors and the Toronto Transit Commission.

=== Re-election (2006) ===
On November 13, 2006, Saundercook was re-elected to Toronto City Council by a margin of 2000 votes over his opponent - Greg Hamara. Saundercook ran primarily on a platform of environmental activism balanced with his record of delivering community improvements.

== Defeat (2010) ==
On October 25, 2010, Saundercook was defeated by Sarah Doucette.

== Election results ==
2010 Toronto election, Ward 13
Candidate	Votes	%
Sarah Doucette	10,100	47.0
Bill Saundercook	7,893	36.8
Nick Pavlov	2,109	9.8
Redmond Weissenberger	1,139	5.3
Jackelyn Van Altenberg	228	1.1
Total	21,469	100

Unofficial results as of October 26, 2010 03:55 am

2006 Toronto election, Ward 13
Candidate	Votes	%
Bill Saundercook	6,930	43.4
Greg Hamara	4,829	30.2
David Garrick	2,904	18.2
Frances Wdowczyk	605	3.8
Linda Coltman	433	2.7
Aleksander Oniszczak	281	1.8
