= Ward 5 York South—Weston =

Municipal council district in Toronto, Ontario, Canada

- Constituency for the Toronto City Council
- Location of Ward 5 in Toronto
- City: Toronto
- Population: 116,685 (2016)

Current constituency
- Created: 2018
- Councillor: Chiara Padovani
- Community council: Etobicoke/York
- Created from: Ward 11; Ward 12
- First contested: 2018 election
- Last contested: 2026 election
- Ward profile: www.toronto.ca/ward-5-york-south-weston/

Ward 5 York South—Weston is a municipal electoral division in Toronto, Ontario, Canada that has been represented in the Toronto City Council since the 2018 municipal election. It was last contested in 2026, with Chiara Padovani being elected councillor.

== Boundaries ==
On August 14, 2018, the Government of Ontario redrew municipal boundaries via the Better Local Government Act, 2018, S.O. 2018, c. 11 - Bill 5. This means that the 25 provincial electoral districts and the 25 municipal wards in Toronto currently share the same geographic borders.

Defined in legislation as:

Consisting of that part of the City of Toronto described as follows: commencing at the intersection of the Humber River with Highway No. 401; thence easterly along said highway to the GO Transit Railway situated easterly of Connie Street; thence southerly along said railway to Rogers Road; thence westerly along said road to Old Weston Road; thence southeasterly along said road to Lavender Road; thence westerly along said road to Keele Street; thence southerly along said street and its southerly production to the GO Transit Railway; thence southeasterly along said railway to the Canadian Pacific Railway; thence generally westerly along said railway to the Humber River; thence generally northerly along said river to the point of commencement.

== History ==
=== 2018 Boundary Adjustment ===
Toronto municipal ward boundaries were significantly modified in 2018 during the election campaign. Ultimately the new ward structure was used and later upheld by the Supreme Court of Canada in 2021.

The current ward is an amalgamation of the old Ward 11 (western section), the old Ward 12 (eastern section).

=== 2018 municipal election ===
Ward 5 York South—Weston was first contested during the 2018 municipal election. Ward-12 incumbent Frank Di Giorgio, who served as budget chief under former mayor Rob Ford ran against Ward 11 incumbent and council speaker Frances Nunziata, and nine other candidates. Nunziata was ultimately elected with 44.55 per cent of the vote.

=== 2022 municipal election ===
In 2022, Nunziata narrowly secured re-election in a tightly contested race against progressive candidate Chiara Padovani, who was endorsed by Progress Toronto and the Toronto & York Region Labour Council. Nunziata prevailed over Padovani by a margin of 94 votes.

== Geography ==
York South—Weston is part of the Etobicoke/York community council.

The ward is largely made up of what was the former city of York prior to Metro Toronto's 1998 amalgamation. It is bordered to the west by the Humber River and the east by a Canadian National Railway track. The north boundary is Highway 401 and the south boundary is a Canadian Pacific Railway track.

== Councillors ==
Council term	Member	
Council term	York Humber (Metro Council)	
1988–1991	Alan Tonks	
1991–1994	Alan Tonks	
1994–1997	Alan Tonks	
	Ward 27 York Humber	
1997–2000	Frances Nunziata, Bill Saundercook	
	Ward 11 York South—Weston	Ward 12 York South—Weston
2000–2003	Frances Nunziata	Frank Di Giorgio
2003–2006	Frances Nunziata	Frank Di Giorgio
2006–2010	Frances Nunziata	Frank Di Giorgio
2010–2014	Frances Nunziata	Frank Di Giorgio
2014–2018	Frances Nunziata	Frank Di Giorgio
	Ward 5 York South—Weston	
2018–2022	Frances Nunziata	
2022–2026	Frances Nunziata	
2026–2030	Chiara Padovani	

== Election results ==
2026 Toronto municipal election

Candidate	Votes	%	minus
Chiara Padovani	13,407	39.10	8.06 ▼
Daniel Di Giorgio	9,818	28.63	–
Frances Nunziata (X)	7,441	21.70	25.91 ▼
Matthew Boateng	910	2.65	–
Ahmed Mawel	705	2.06	–
Sharmarke Ali	679	1.98	–
Sileen Phillips	607	1.77	–
Maryama Farah	537	1.57	–
Nekpen Obasogie	183	0.53	–

2022 Toronto municipal election, Ward 5 York South—Weston
Candidate	Vote	%
Frances Nunziata (X)	10,077	47.61
Chiara Padovani	9,983	47.16
Gabriel Takang	1,107	5.23

2018 Toronto municipal election, Ward 5 York South—Weston
Candidate	Votes	Vote share
Frances Nunziata	8,425	32.18%
Frank Di Giorgio	5,674	21.67%
Chiara Padovani	5,358	20.47%
Lekan Olawoye	3,889	14.85%
Deeqa Barre	1,172	4.48%
Keaton Austin	467	1.78%
Luis Portillo	352	1.34%
Fred Fosu	245	0.94%
Joey Carapinha	241	0.92%
Cedric Ogilvie	189	0.72%
Harpreet Gulri	168	0.64%
Total	26,180	100%
Source: City of Toronto

== See also ==
- Municipal elections in Canada
- Municipal government of Toronto
- List of Toronto municipal elections
