= Frances Nunziata =

Canadian municipal politician and Speaker of Toronto City Council

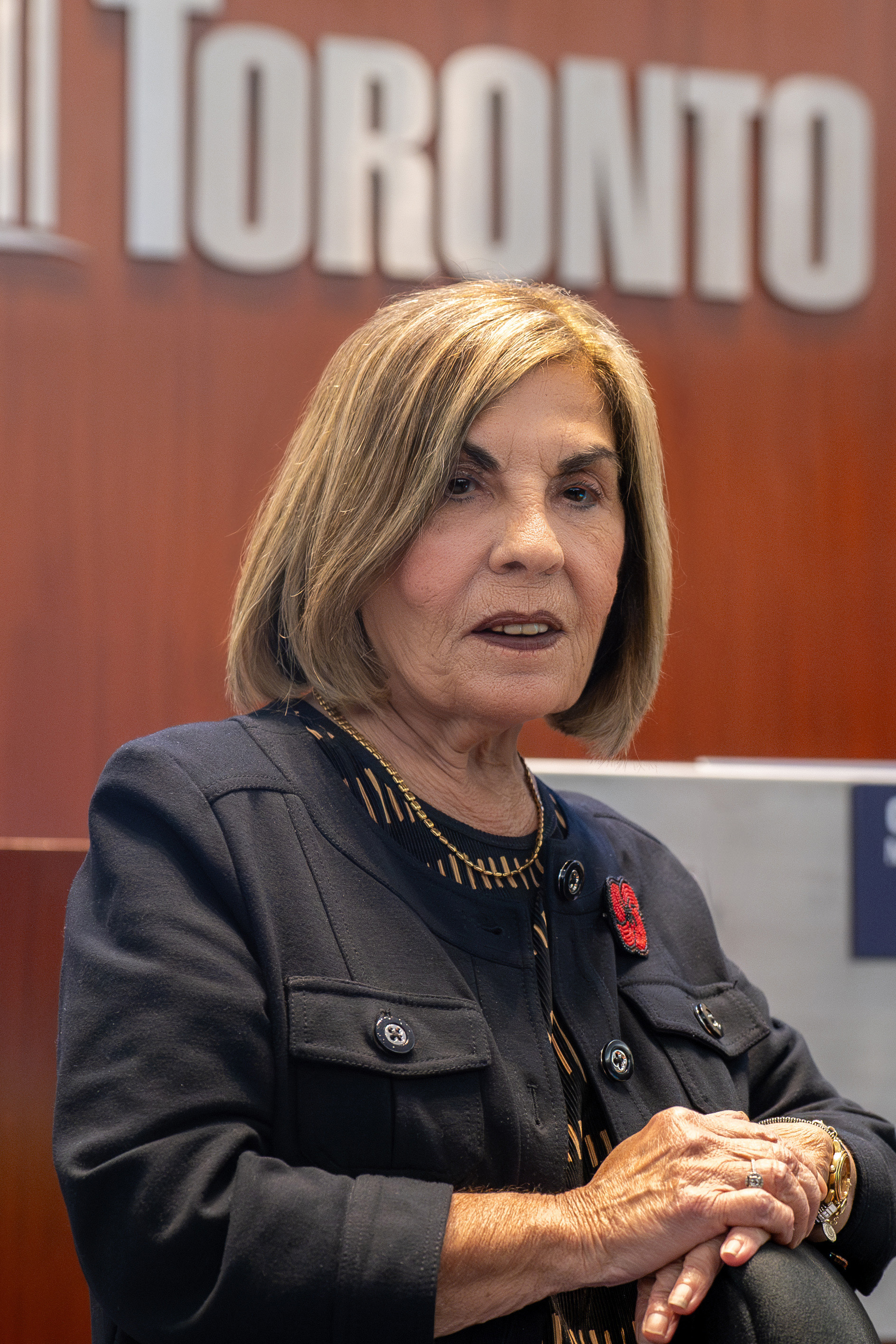
- Nunziata in 2025

2nd Speaker of Toronto City Council
- In office December 1, 2010 – November 15, 2026
- Preceded by: Sandra Bussin
- Succeeded by: Ausma Malik

Toronto City Councillor for Ward 5 York South—Weston
- In office December 1, 2018 – November 15, 2026
- Preceded by: Office established
- Succeeded by: Chiara Padovani

Toronto City Councilor for Ward 11 York South—Weston
- In office December 1, 2000 – December 1, 2018

Toronto City Councilor for Ward 27 York-Humber
- In office January 1, 1998 – December 1, 2000

Mayor of York
- In office 1994–1997
- Preceded by: Fergy Brown
- Succeeded by: Office abolished (municipal amalgamation)

Personal details
- Born: 1951 or 1952 (age 74–75) Naples, Italy
- Relatives: John Nunziata (brother)
- Occupation: Politician

Frances Nunziata (/ˌnʊntsiˈɑːtə/ NUUN-tsee-AH-tə, Italian: [nunˈtsjaːta]; born 1951 or 1952) is a Canadian politician. Nunziata was elected to York City Council 1988 and served as the last mayor of the City of York from 1994 to 1997, when York was amalgamated into Toronto. She continued to represent part of York on Toronto City Council from 1998 to 2026 and served as the speaker of Toronto City Council from 2010 to 2026.

Nunziata was first elected to public office in 1985 as a trustee for the Board of Education for the City of York. In 1988, she was elected to York City Council, defeating incumbent Gary Bloor and was later elected as mayor of York in 1994. York, along with other municipalities which made up Metropolitan Toronto was amalgamated into a single city of Toronto in 1998, and Nunziata was elected to represent Ward 27 York Humber on the new Toronto City Council. She was re-elected as the ward was re-organized into Ward 11 York South—Weston and later Ward 5 York South—Weston, and became the council speaker in 2010. In the 2026 municipal election, Nunziata was defeated by Chiara Padovani, making Nunziata’s council term end on November 15, 2026. Nunziata is the sister of former Member of Parliament John Nunziata and the aunt of Toronto District School Board trustee Patrick Nunziata.

== Early life ==
Nunziata was born in Naples, Italy and immigrated to Canada in 1952 after travelling from Italy aboard the Vulcania docking at Pier 21 in Halifax, Nova Scotia. She spent her early years in Canada in Revelstoke, British Columbia. In 1963, the family moved to Toronto. Before entering politics, she worked as an accounting clerk and became active in civic issues through the Harwood Ratepayers Association.

== Political career ==
=== City of York ===
Nunziata was first elected as a school board trustee for the City of York in 1985. She was elected to York City Council in 1988, after defeating incumbent Gary Bloor.

In 1994, she challenged incumbent mayor Fergy Brown and was elected as Mayor of York. She served in that role until 1997, when the City of York was amalgamated into Toronto.

=== Toronto City Council ===
Following amalgamation, Nunziata was elected to represent Ward 11, later reconfigured into Ward 5 (York South–Weston).

Nunziata focused on public safety, infrastructure renewal, and affordable housing throughout her tenure. She played a role in negotiations that led to a stop for the Union Pearson Express in Weston and has supported community revitalization projects including park upgrades, seniors’ housing, and youth programs.

On December 7, 2010, Nunziata was elected by council as the speaker of Toronto City Council. She was re-elected to the position by her council colleagues at the start of each following term.

Nunziata served as Vice-Chair of the Planning and Housing Committee and was a member of several city boards and committees, including the Audit Committee, Etobicoke York Community Council, CreateTO Board, and Toronto Parking Authority.

In the 2022 Toronto municipal election, Nunziata was re-elected in Ward 5 (York South–Weston) with 10,077 votes to Chiara Padovani’s 9,983, a margin of 94 votes.

In the 2026 Toronto municipal election, Nunziata was defeated in her bid for re-election in Ward 5 (York South-Weston) by Padovani. Her term on Toronto City Council, including her service as speaker, ended on November 15, 2026.

==== Community initiatives ====
Nunziata was active in community projects through her ward office, supporting neighbourhood improvement associations, local business improvement areas (BIAs), and youth programming. Her office collaborated with the Weston Village BIA and Mount Dennis BIA on beautification and small business initiatives. She also supported affordable housing projects, seniors' programs, and community policing initiatives.

==== Integrity Commissioner report (2024) ====
In July 2024, the integrity commissioner of Toronto released a report regarding the use of constituent contact information in the 2022 municipal election. The report concluded that Nunziata had breached Articles 5 and 7 of the City Council Code of Conduct by transferring constituent email information to her campaign without explicit consent, and recommended a reprimand by city council.

== Electoral record ==
Year	Ward / Position	Votes	%	Main opponent(s)
2026	Ward 5 York South–Weston	7,441	21.7%	Chiara Padovani (13,407 – 39.1%)
2022	Ward 5 York South–Weston	10,077	47.61%	Chiara Padovani (9,983 – 47.16%)
2018	Ward 5 York South–Weston	8,425	32.18%	Frank Di Giorgio (5,674)
2014	Ward 11	13,201	71.33%	Jose Garcia (3,212 – 17.36%)
2010	Ward 11	10,544	66.79%	Fulvio Sansone (2,290 – 14.51%)
2006	Ward 11	6,469	49.60%	Paul Ferreira (4,812 – 36.90%)
2003	Ward 11	9,819	77.98%	Rosemarie Mulhall (2,772 – 22.02%)

- Sources: City of Toronto – City Clerk official declarations.

== Personal life ==
Nunziata is a longtime resident of York South–Weston. She served continuously in elected office from 1985 to 2026 and described her work as focused on neighbourhood safety, local infrastructure, and community engagement.
