= Lily Cheng =

Canadian politician

Toronto City Councillor for Ward 18 Willowdale
- Incumbent
- Assumed office November 15, 2022
- Preceded by: John Filion

Personal details
- Born: Toronto, Ontario, Canada
- Party: Independent
- Website: www.lilycheng.ca

Lily Cheng is a Canadian politician who has represented Ward 18 Willowdale on Toronto City Council since 2022. First elected in the 2022 Toronto municipal election, she was re-elected in 2026.

== Background ==
Cheng's parents are immigrants from Taiwan. Cheng first became known as founder of North York Moms, an online discussion forum for mothers in the Willowdale area. In 2018, she organized a march through the neighbourhood to reclaim Yonge Street and advocate for public safety in the neighbourhood following the 2018 Toronto van attack. Prior to her election in 2022, she also served as the executive director of the NeighbourLink North York food bank.

== Political career ==
Cheng ran against incumbent councillor John Filion in the 2018 Toronto municipal election. Filion had originally intended not to run again that year, and had in fact endorsed Cheng as his successor in the former Ward 29, however, after the provincial government of Doug Ford passed legislation cutting the size of the city council in half by aligning ward boundaries with provincial and federal electoral district boundaries in the city, Filion changed his mind and ran again, winning the seat over Cheng.

=== 2022 election ===
Following Filion's retirement from politics in 2022 she ran again, winning the seat over Filion's former chief of staff Markus O'Brien Fehr. She campaigned largely on issues of housing in the ward, including opposing a controversial supportive housing development on Cummer Avenue and lobbying for greater community input into a municipal plan to lease a hotel in the ward as an emergency homeless shelter.

Cheng won the seat following the October 24 election and took office on November 15.

=== 2026 election ===
Cheng ran for a second term in the 2026 Toronto municipal election. She received the endorsement of ABC Toronto, a conservative municipal political organization.

Cheng was re-elected on October 26, 2026, receiving 20,746 votes (63.10%), defeating five challengers. Her nearest opponent, David Magazzinich, received 6,804 votes (20.69%). Cheng increased her share of the vote by 21.38 percentage points compared with the 2022 election.

== Election results ==
2026 Toronto municipal election, Ward 18 Willowdale
Candidate	Votes	%	±%
Lily Cheng (X)	20,746	63.10	+21.38
David Magazzinich	6,804	20.69	—
Ardeshir Zarezade	2,445	7.44	—
Hamid Shakeri	1,129	3.43	—
Nicole Daneshvar	1,115	3.39	—
Nathan Yusifov	639	1.94	—
Total valid votes	32,878	100.00	—

2022 Toronto municipal election, Ward 18 Willowdale
Candidate	Vote	%
Lily Cheng	8,337	41.72
Markus O'Brien Fehr	6,709	33.58
Daniel Lee	4,617	23.11
Elhan Shahban	318	1.59

2018 Toronto election, Ward 18 - Willowdale
Candidate	Votes	%
John Filion	8,104	31.06%
Lily Cheng	5,149	19.74%
Sonny Cho	3,130	12.00%
David Mousavi	1,596	6.12%
Danny DeSantis	1,486	5.70%
Norman Gardner	1,476	5.67%
Sam Moini	1,289	4.94%
Saman Tabasi Nejad	1,189	4.56%
Winston Park	593	2.27%
Gerald Mak	545	2.09%
David Epstein	538	2.06%
Albert Kim	291	1.12%
Farah Aslani	187	0.72%
Andrew Herbst	162	0.62%
Hamid Shakeri	122	0.47%
Chung Jin Park	101	0.39%
Sam Mathi	66	0.25%
Marvin Honickman	61	0.23%
