= Sarah Doucette =

Canadian politician

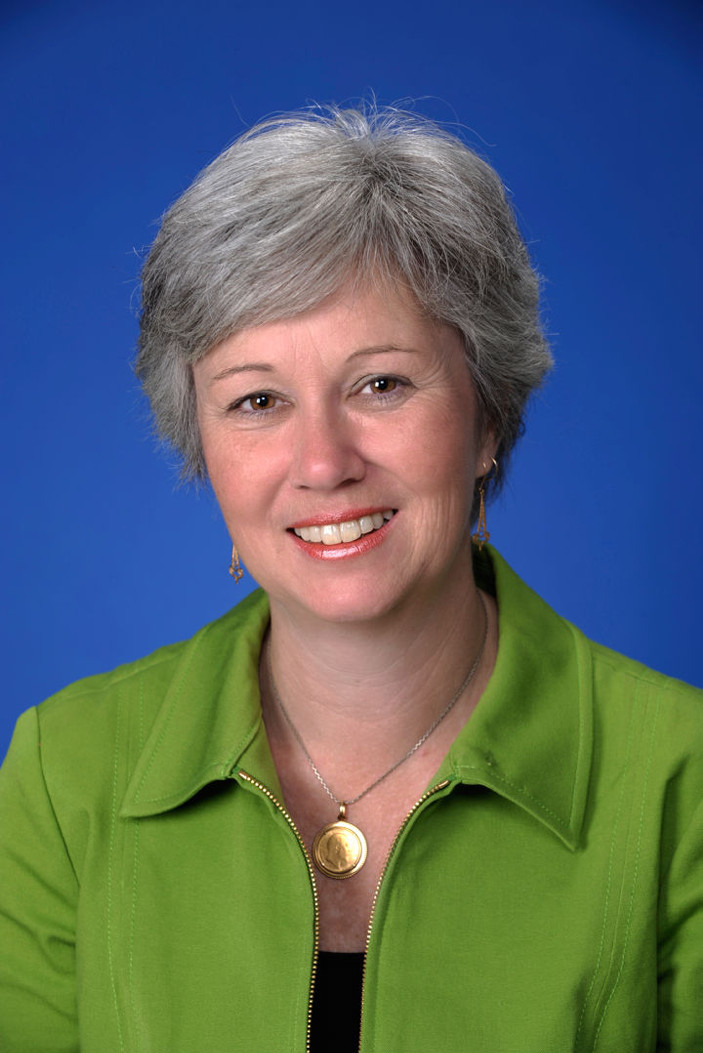
- Doucette in 2010

Toronto City Councillor for Ward 13 Parkdale-High Park
- In office December 1, 2010 – December 1, 2018
- Preceded by: Bill Saundercook
- Constituency: Ward 13, Parkdale–High Park

Personal details
- Born: Winchester, United Kingdom
- Children: 2
- Occupation: Public Administrator

Sarah Doucette (/duːˈsɛt/ doo-SET) is a Canadian politician, who served on Toronto City Council from 2010 to 2018. In the 2010 city council election, Doucette defeated Bill Saundercook in Ward 13, Parkdale–High Park. Doucette was born in Winchester, Hampshire but grew up on the Isle of Wight, in the United Kingdom in the 1960s. Doucette came to Canada in 1980. She and her husband have two children. They have lived in the Swansea neighbourhood of Toronto for fifteen years. Doucette worked at the Swansea Town Hall since 2004 and in 2008, she became executive assistant to the executive director. To run for city council she had to take a leave of absence from her job. The 2010 election race was her first campaign. She was re-elected in 2014, but decided not to run in the 2018 election. Doucette comes from a long line of municipal politicians. Both her grandfather and her mother were city councillors and were then elected as mayors: he, in Winchester in 1953, and she in the county of the Isle of Wight, during the 1990s. Doucette supported Peggy Nash in her bid to become leader of the New Democratic Party of Canada.

== Election results ==
2014 Toronto Election, Ward 13
Candidate	Votes	%
Sarah Doucette	16,202	65.6
Nick Pavlov	2,628	10.6
Eugene Melnyk	1,202	4.9
Taras Kulish	1,145	4.6
8 other candidates. (Note: Candidates who posted less than 1,000 votes were: Thomas Dempsey, Matthew Bielaski, Alex Perez, Evan Tummillo, Rishi Sharma, Greg Lada, István Tar, Bohdan Spas)	3,514	14.2
Total	24,691	99.9

2010 Toronto election, Ward 13
Candidate	Votes	%
Sarah Doucette	10,100	47.04
Bill Saundercook	7,893	36.76
Nick Pavlov	2,109	9.82
Redmond Weissenberger	1,139	5.30
Jackelyn Van Altenberg	228	1.06
Total	21,469	100%
