= John Filion =

Canadian politician

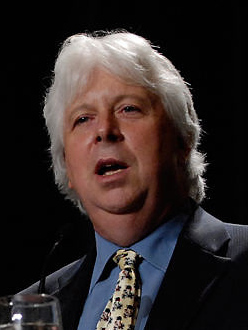
- Filion in 2008

Toronto City Councillor for Ward 18 (Willowdale)
- In office December 1, 2018 – November 15, 2022
- Preceded by: Ward Created
- Succeeded by: Lily Cheng

Toronto City Councillor for Ward 23 (Willowdale)
- In office December 1, 2000 – November 30, 2018
- Preceded by: Ward Created
- Succeeded by: wards redistributed

Toronto City Councillor for Ward 10 (North York Centre)
- In office January 1, 1998 – December 1, 2000 Serving with Norm Gardner
- Preceded by: Ward Created
- Succeeded by: wards redistributed

Personal details
- Born: 1950 (age 75–76) Montreal, Quebec, Canada
- Domestic partner: Anna Maria Tremonti
- Occupation: Journalist

John Filion (/ˈfɪliən/ FIL-ee-ən; born 1950) is a former Toronto city councillor represented Ward 18 Willowdale. Although he had planned to retire in 2018, after the legislation from Premier Doug Ford which expanded ward boundaries, he decided to run for re-election because he believes it makes it "virtually impossible for a community activist, known within one area, to get elected". He announced on June 10, 2022, that he would not be running in the October 2022 Toronto municipal election, retiring after 40 years in municipal politics. He was considered a "rare suburban progressive" on Toronto council.

== Education ==
Filion attended York University, and he graduated with a degree in history. He became a journalist specializing in education issues. He was the founding editor of the Canadian Global Almanac.

== Early political career ==
He first entered politics as a trustee on the North York Board of Education, to which he was elected in 1981. From 1987 to 1990, he served as chair of the school board. He was elected to North York's city council in 1990, replacing retiring councillor Jim McGuffin. He moved to Toronto city council with the creation of the new city in 1997. He received a great deal of attention for his role as chair of the city's Board of Health. He used this position to push for a smoking ban in Toronto bars and restaurants and to force restaurants to post records of their health inspections. As a member of the police services board he was a sharp critic of chief Julian Fantino and also publicly accused members of the police force of monitoring his activities.

== Mayor Rob Ford stripped of powers ==
In 2013, after admissions by Mayor Rob Ford that he had purchased and smoked crack cocaine while in office, made homophobic and racist remarks and possibly drove while intoxicated, Filion put forward an emergency motion which transferred much of the mayor's budget and emergency powers to the Deputy Mayor. A further motion put forward by Filion also removed his ability to set key matters on the legislative agenda and removed his right to fill vacancies on the civic appointments committee.

== Chair of Toronto Board of Health ==
As chair of the Toronto Board of Health, Filion created the DineSafe eatery inspection and notification system which increased compliance with food safety regulations in Toronto restaurants from 42% to 90% and reduced cases of food-borne illnesses in Toronto by 30% in its first 8 years. He also championed the restaurant smoking ban.

== Toronto Parking Authority land purchase ==
Executives from the Toronto Parking Authority and Giorgio Mammoliti pushed for a deal that would have had the city overpay by approximately $2.6 million for a piece of land in Mammoliti's ward, according to a report to Toronto City Council by law firm Torys LLP. The deal was days from being completed when it fell through largely due to pressure from Filion. Filion repeatedly questioned the cost of the purchase. He also accused Toronto Parking Authority executives of withholding information. According to the report Filion told the TPA's vice president of real estate, Maria Casista, "I'm calling the cops". Toronto's auditor general and the Ontario Provincial Police are currently (2018) investigating the land deal.

== A La Cart ==
Filion spearheaded Toronto's A La Cart program, an attempt to introduce variety into Toronto's street food scene. The program was terminated two years into its three-year pilot program. Some participants in the program complained they were left bankrupt from the experience. Meddling city bureaucracy and expensive, city-specified food carts that malfunctioned were some of the reasons cited for the failure of Filion's program. Councillor Filion wouldn't apologize for the failure but did admit to it being a humbling experience. He suggested he would do it differently if given the chance.

== Target of violence ==
Early on April 4, 2019, bullets were fired into Filion's car and home, several weeks after an armed man attempted to force his way into Filion's home. Filion stated, "I suspect I have been targeted and that this is related to my work as a city councillor."

== Personal life ==
He is the partner of Canadian Broadcasting Corporation journalist Anna Maria Tremonti.

== Election results (Toronto City Council) ==
2018 Toronto election, Ward 18 - Willowdale
Candidate	Votes	%
(x)John Filion	8,104	31.06%
Lily Cheng	5,149	19.74%
Sonny Cho	3,130	12.00%
David Mousavi	1,596	6.12%
Danny DeSantis	1,486	5.70%
Norman Gardner	1,476	5.67%
Sam Moini	1,289	4.94%
Saman Tabasi Nejad	1,189	4.56%
Winston Park	593	2.27%
Gerald Mak	545	2.09%
David Epstein	538	2.96%
Albert Kim	291	1.12%
Farah Aslani	187	0.72%
Andrew Herbst	162	0.62%
Hamid Shakeri	122	0.47%
Chung Jin Park	101	0.39%
Sam Mathi	66	0.25%
Marvin Honickman	61	0.23%

2014 Toronto election, Ward 23
Candidate	Votes	%
(x)John Filion	14,128	55.49%
David Mousavi	7,951	31.23%
Kun-Won Park	2,049	8.05%
Chris Penny	593	2.33%
Scott Werle	380	1.49%
Carmen Kedzior	358	1.41%
Total	25,459	100.00%

2010 Toronto election, Ward 23
Candidate	Votes	%
(x)John Filion	13,666	65.9
Dusan Kralik	2,456	11.8
Peter Clarke	2,129	10.2
John Whyte	1,445	7.0
Charles Sutherland	1,055	5.1
Total	20,751	100

Unofficial results as of October 26, 2010 03:55 am

2006 Toronto election, Ward 23
Candidate	Votes	%
(x)John Filion	8,853	57.4
Andrew Miller	5,235	34.0
Cornel Chifor	557	3.6
Mohammed Choudhary	394	2.6
Ignacio Manlangit	373	2.4

2003 Toronto election, Ward 23
Candidate	Votes	%
(x)John Filion	13,836	83.34
Ignacio Manlangit	2,757	16.66

2000 Toronto election, Ward 23
Candidate	Votes
(x)John Filion	10,213
Ron Summers	5,395
Youval Zilberberg	813

1997 Toronto election, Ward 10; North York Centre (2 elected)
Candidate	Votes
John Filion	17,533
Norman Gardner	15,135
Ron Summers	11,212
