= Ranked Ballot Initiative of Toronto =

Ranked Ballot Initiative of Toronto (RaBIT)
- Formation: 2010
- Founder: Dave Meslin
- Type: Grassroots advocacy group
- Headquarters: Toronto, Ontario, Canada
- Website: rabit.ca
- Formerly called: Better Ballots

Ranked Ballot Initiative of Toronto (RaBIT) is a Canadian grassroots, public policy and advocacy group that supports reforming the municipal electoral voting system in the city of Toronto from a first-past-the-post voting system to instant runoff voting.

== Founding and Mission ==
Founded by "community choreographer" Dave Meslin, RaBIT grew out of a series of community town hall meetings conducted under the name Better Ballots in the Spring of 2010. Community members voted at these meetings for instant runoff voting as their preferred method of ballot reform from fourteen options, and enfranchisement for permanent residents of Toronto as the most popular choice of democracy-building overall. Following these consultations, RaBIT formed to advocate for ranked ballots to be put into law in time for the 2014 election.

== Activities ==
=== 2010 to 2016 – Work to enable municipal ranked ballots in Ontario ===
With the profile of electoral reform raised throughout the city, on August 25, 2010, a motion was put forward by Ward 29-Councillor Case Ootes requesting a review of potential changes to the Municipal Elections Act before requesting the change with the province. The motion was approved with thirty-five councillors voting in favor, one councillor voting against, and nine councillors absent.

Once the report was released, council formally requested enabling legislation from the Ontario Legislature in June 2013, with twenty-six councillors supporting the motion and fifteen against. In response to the request and a RaBIT petition signed by over eight thousand people, the Liberal MPP for Scarborough-Guildwood, Mitzie Hunter, introduced the Toronto Ranked Ballots Election Act in March 2014. The bill passed the second reading, but died prematurely when the election was called. NDP MPP for Davenport Jonah Schein had introduced similar legislation just prior to Hunter's.

During the 2014 provincial election campaign, Premier Kathleen Wynne announced that, if re-elected, the Liberal government would introduce legislation that would enable all Ontario municipalities to use ranked ballots if they so chose. The Globe and Mail applauded the announcement in an editorial, saying her announcement was "excellent news." After the election, the Premier sent Minister of Municipal Affairs and Housing, Ted McMeekin, a mandate letter that charged him with bringing forward legislation that would provide "municipalities with the option of using ranked ballots in future elections, starting in 2018, as an alternative to first-past-the-post."

In spring 2015, Minister McMeekin announced a consultation process aimed at gathering input from the public on how the government should implement its promise to provide municipalities with the ability to use ranked ballots. At the same time, the province launched a technical working group to discuss the issues surrounding implementation of ranked ballots at the municipal level with public servants and other stakeholders with the aim of informing the legislative drafting process. Andrew Coyne welcomed the change in his National Post column, saying that ranked ballots would encourage "more civil, less divisive campaigns."

At Toronto City Council in October 2015, a motion was inserted into the Five-Year Review of the City of Toronto Act that sought to reverse council's previous request for the province to allow ranked voting. A number of councillors reversed their previous decisions in support of electoral reform and the motion passed 25–18. Councillors against the motion decried the reversal for its "lack of public input" and called it a "setback for democratic reform and renewal." The Ministry of Municipal Affairs said they were moving forward with providing the option of ranked ballot voting despite the council motion.

In April 2016, Minister McMeekin announced proposed legislation to give municipalities the option to use ranked ballots in future municipal elections. The Toronto Star Editorial Board praised the announcement, saying, "Queen’s Park did the right thing by ignoring a regressive and self-centred vote by Toronto city council and allow ranked ballots." Shortly after the announcement, a Mainstreet Research poll was released that found 59 per cent of Torontonians supported ranked ballots.

By June 2016, enabling legislation was passed in Bill 181, which also shortened the length of campaign periods, banned donations from unions and corporations, reformed campaign finance laws, clarified the rights of tenants and people with disabilities in elections, and laid out rules for administration, compliance, and candidacy. The Department of Municipal Affairs and Housing also released a series of resources explaining the allocation of ranked ballots and set rules for when and how municipalities should educate the public before an election that used them. The more detailed regulations allowing implementation of ranked ballots by municipalities were eventually released in September 2016.

=== 2016 to 2020 – Work to implement ranked ballots in Toronto ===
The release of these regulations prompted City of Toronto staff to draft a report to city council that would analyze these changes to the Municipal Elections Act and their potential impact. The report was completed in November 2016 and considered by Toronto City Council's executive committee in a meeting on 1 December 2016. In this meeting, Councillor Paul Ainslie moved a motion to direct staff to look into the possibility of creating an independent citizen's reference panel to consider whether the city should switch to ranked ballots for its elections. This motion was defeated by a vote of 6 to 3 with 4 members absent.

A few days later, the matter was again considered, this time by full council in a meeting on 13 December. Councillor Ainslie moved the same motion which was defeated by a vote of 22 to 17 with 5 councillors absent. Some councillors argued against the motion claiming that ranked ballots were hard to understand and that the current first-past-the-post system worked fine. This sparked a response from Toronto Star columnist, Edward Keenan, who argued that every councillor who voted against implementing a panel was either a "useless or actively bad" city councillor ^{[23]}.

With this setback, RaBIT shifted its focus from politicians to voters. RaBIT launched a new petition asking council to implement ranked ballots as soon as possible. RaBIT also worked to make ranked ballots an issue in the 2018 Toronto municipal election, including that the intervention by the Ontario government to reduce Toronto's 47 wards into 25 wards resulted in more candidates per ward and increased concern about vote splitting.

=== 2020 to present – Work to re-enable municipal ranked ballot voting in Ontario ===
While Toronto was progressing toward use of ranked ballot voting, in November 2020 the Ontario government passed bill 218, which included a provision retracting the right of municipalities to use ranked ballot voting. This development required RaBIT to turn attention back to the Provincial level to advocate for restoring the right of municipalities to use ranked ballots. RaBIT is drawing on evidence from the London, Ontario successful use of ranked ballots in the 2018 municipal election to strengthen the case for ranked ballots in Ontario municipal elections.
