= List of visible minority politicians in Canada =

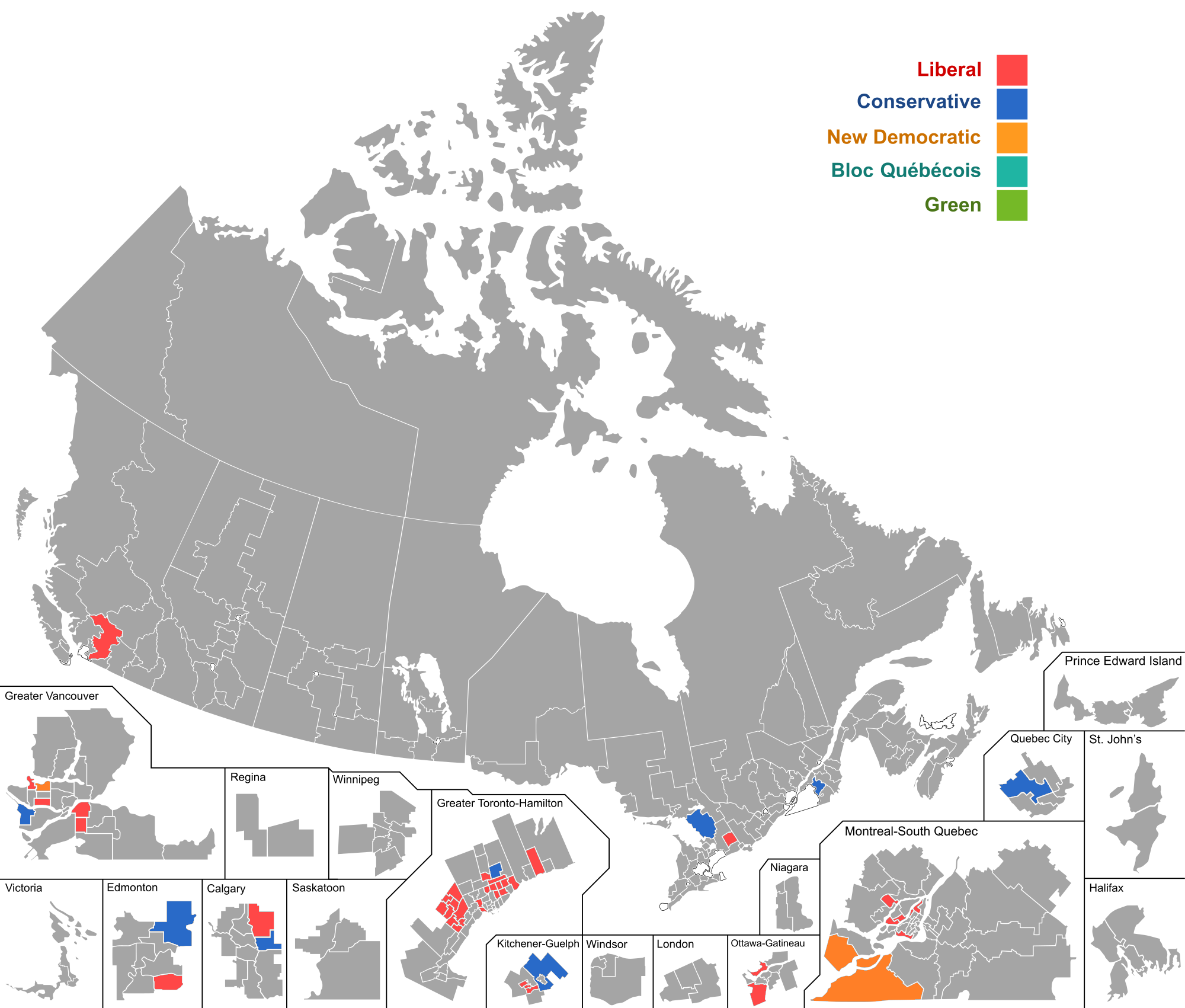
Federal electoral districts represented by visible minorities during the 42nd Canadian Parliament (2015–2019) marked by party colour

This list comprises persons who belong to a visible minority group who have been elected to the federal House of Commons, legislative assemblies of provinces and territories, and members appointed to the Senate. Note that the term "visible minority" refers to Canadians who identify as neither white nor indigenous.

The first visible minority elected was Chinese-Canadian Douglas Jung, elected as a Conservative MP to the House of Commons in the 1957 federal election.

There have been 138 visible minorities who have served as Members of Parliament, as well as 32 who have been named senators. After the 2021 Canadian election, the highest number of visible minorities were elected to Parliament in history – with 53 MPs (15.7% of the House of Commons). As of November 2023, of the visible minority members of the 44th Canadian Parliament, 43 are Liberals, ten are Conservatives (seven MPs, three Senators), three are New Democrats (three MPs) and 16 are Independents (two MPs, ten ISG Senators, three Progressive Senators, one CSG Senator).

Provincially and territorially, visible minorities have been elected to all 13 legislatures. As of December 2024, there are 117 visible minority politicians serving in 10 provincial/territorial legislatures. Of those members, 49 are New Democrats, 45 are Conservatives (24 Progressive Conservative, eight BC Conservative, six CAQ, five UCP, one Saskatchewan Party, one Yukon Party), 18 are Liberals (11 Liberal, seven Quebec Liberal), four represent Quebec sovereigntist parties (Québec Solidaire) and one is currently an independent (Sarah Jama).

== Federal ==
=== House of Commons ===
Member of Parliament	Riding	Took office	Left office	Party	Ref.	Note
Douglas Jung 鄭天華 (1924–2002)	Vancouver Centre	June 10, 1957	June 17, 1962	Conservative		Chinese-Canadian (Cantonese) First Visible Minority elected to Canadian Parliament; First Chinese Canadian elected to Canadian Parliament; First Conservative Visible Minority elected to Canadian Parliament
Lincoln Alexander (1922–2012)	Hamilton West	June 25, 1968	September 7, 1980	Conservative		Black Canadian (Jamaican/Vicentian); First Black Canadian elected to Canadian Parliament
Pierre de Bané بيير دي باين (1938–2019)	Matapédia—Matane	June 25, 1968	June 28, 1984	Liberal		Lebanese-Canadian First Liberal Visible Minority elected to Canadian Parliament; First Arab Canadian elected to Canadian Parliament
Art Lee 李橋棟 (born 1947)	Vancouver East	July 8, 1974	May 21, 1979	Liberal		Chinese-Canadian (Cantonese) BC Liberal Party Leader (1984–1987)
Fonse Faour فونس فاعور (born 1951)	Humber—St. George's—St. Barbe	October 16, 1978	February 17, 1980	NDP		Lebanese-Canadian
Sam Wakim سام واكيم (1937–2022)	Don Valley East	May 22, 1979	February 17, 1980	Conservative		Lebanese-Canadian
Howard McCurdy (1932–2018)	Windsor—Lake St. Clair	September 4, 1984	October 24, 1993	NDP		Black Canadian (Jamaican)
Mark Assad مارك الأسد (born 1940)	Gatineau	November 21, 1988	June 27, 2004	Liberal		Lebanese-Canadian
Mac Harb ماك حرب (born 1953)	Ottawa Centre	November 21, 1988	September 8, 2003	Liberal		Lebanese-Canadian
Allan Koury ألان كوري (1930–2004)	Hochelaga—Maisonneuve	November 21, 1988	October 24, 1993	Conservative		Lebanese-Canadian
Rey Pagtakhan (born 1935)	Winnipeg North	November 21, 1988	June 27, 2004	Liberal		Filipino-Canadian First Filipino Canadian elected to Canadian Parliament
Sarkis Assadourian; Սարկիս Ասադուրյան (born 1948)	Don Valley North	October 25, 1993	June 1, 1997	Liberal		Armenian-Canadian First Armenian Canadian elected to the Canadian Parliament
Sarkis Assadourian; Սարկիս Ասադուրյան (born 1948)	Brampton Centre	June 2, 1997	June 27, 2004	Liberal		Armenian-Canadian First Armenian Canadian elected to the Canadian Parliament
Jean Augustine (born 1937)	Etobicoke-Lakeshore	October 25, 1993	January 23, 2006	Liberal		Black Canadian (Grenadian) First Female Visible Minority elected to Canadian Parliament
Jag Bhaduria ਜਗ ਭਡੂਰਿਆ (born 1940)	Markham—Whitchurch-Stouffville	October 25, 1993	June 1, 1997	Independent		Indian-Canadian (Punjabi) First Indo-Canadian Elected to Canadian Parliament; First Sikh Elected to Canadian Parliament; Liberal MP (1993–1994)
Raymond Chan 陳卓愉 (born 1951)	Richmond	October 25, 1993	November 26, 2000	Liberal		Chinese-Canadian (Cantonese)
Raymond Chan 陳卓愉 (born 1951)	Richmond	June 28, 2004	October 13, 2008	Liberal		Chinese-Canadian (Cantonese)
Herb Dhaliwal ਹਰਬ ਧਾਲੀਵਾਲ (born 1952)	Vancouver South	October 25, 1993	June 27, 2004	Liberal		Indian-Canadian (Punjabi) First Indo-Canadian Elected to Canadian Parliament; First Sikh Elected to Canadian Parliament
Hedy Fry (born 1941)	Vancouver Centre	October 25, 1993	Incumbent	Liberal		Eurasian Canadian (Trinidadian) First Female Visible Minority Elected to Canadian Parliament
Ovid Jackson (born 1939)	Bruce—Grey—Owen Sound	October 25, 1993	June 27, 2004	Liberal		Black Canadian (Guyanese)
Gurbax Singh Malhi ਗੁਰਬਖਸ਼ ਸਿੰਘ ਮੱਲ੍ਹੀ (born 1949)	Bramalea—Gore—Malton	October 25, 1993	May 1, 2011	Liberal		Indian-Canadian (Punjabi) First Indo-Canadian Elected to Canadian Parliament; First Sikh Elected to Canadian Parliament; First Turbaned politician elected to Canadian Parliament
Keith Martin (born 1960)	Esquimalt—Juan de Fuca	October 25, 1993	May 1, 2011	Liberal		Reform MP (1993–2004)
Osvaldo Nunez (born 1938)	Bourassa	October 25, 1993	June 1, 1997	Bloc Québécois		Chilean-Canadian First Chilean Canadian elected to Canadian Parliament
Paul Zed بول زيد (born 1956)	Fundy—Royal	October 25, 1993	June 1, 1997	Liberal		Lebanese-Canadian
Paul Zed بول زيد (born 1956)	Saint John—Rothesay	June 28, 2004	October 13, 2008	Liberal		Lebanese-Canadian
Gordon Earle (born 1943)	Halifax West	June 2, 1997	November 26, 2000	NDP		Black Canadian (Jamaican)
Gurmant Grewal ਗੁਰਮੰਤ ਗਰੇਵਾਲ (born 1957)	Newton—North Delta	June 2, 1997	January 22, 2006	Conservative		Indian-Canadian (Punjabi)
Rahim Jaffer رحيم جعفر (born 1971)	Edmonton—Strathcona	June 2, 1997	October 13, 2008	Conservative		Indian-Canadian (Gujarati) First Muslim elected to Canadian Parliament; First Afro-Indian Canadian elected to Canadian Parliament
Marlene Jennings (born 1951)	Notre-Dame-de-Grâce—Lachine	June 2, 1997	May 1, 2011	Liberal		Black Canadian (African-American)
Sophia Leung 梁陳明任 (born 1933)	Vancouver Kingsway	June 2, 1997	June 27, 2004	Liberal		Chinese-Canadian (Cantonese)
Inky Mark 麥鼎鴻 (born 1947)	Dauphin—Swan River—Marquette	June 2, 1997	September 15, 2010	Conservative		Chinese-Canadian (Mainland)
Deepak Obhrai (1950–2019)	Calgary Forest Lawn	June 2, 1997	August 2, 2019	Conservative		Indian-Canadian (Punjabi) First Afro-Indian Canadian elected to Canadian Parliament; First Hindu Elected to Canadian Parliament
Jacques Saada (born 1947)	Brossard—La Prairie	June 2, 1997	January 23, 2006	Liberal		Tunisian-Canadian
Navdeep Bains ਨਵਦੀਪ ਸਿੰਘ ਬੈਂਸ (born 1977)	Mississauga—Brampton South	June 28, 2004	May 1, 2011	Liberal		Indian-Canadian (Punjabi)
Navdeep Bains ਨਵਦੀਪ ਸਿੰਘ ਬੈਂਸ (born 1977)	Mississauga—Malton	October 19, 2015	September 19, 2021	Liberal		Indian-Canadian (Punjabi)
Michael Chong 莊文浩 (born 1971)	Wellington—Halton Hills North	June 28, 2004	Incumbent	Conservative		Chinese-Canadian (Cantonese)
Ruby Dhalla ਰੂਬੀ ਢੱਲਾ (born 1974)	Brampton—Springdale	June 28, 2004	May 1, 2011	Liberal		Indian-Canadian (Punjabi)
Ujjal Dosanjh ਉੱਜਲ ਦੇਵ ਸਿੰਘ ਦੁਸਾਂਝ (born 1947)	Vancouver South	June 28, 2004	May 1, 2011	Liberal		Indian-Canadian (Punjabi)
Meili Faille (born 1972)	Vaudreuil—Soulanges	June 28, 2004	May 1, 2011	Bloc Québécois		Taiwanese-Canadian
Nina Grewal ਨੀਨਾ ਗਰੇਵਾਲ (born 1958)	Fleetwood—Port Kells	June 28, 2004	October 18, 2015	Conservative		Indian-Canadian (Punjabi)
Wajid Khan واجد خان (born 1946)	Mississauga—Streetsville	June 28, 2004	October 13, 2008	Conservative		Pakistani Canadian (Punjabi) First Pakistani Canadian elected to Canadian Parliament; Liberal MP (2004–2007)
Maka Kotto (born 1961)	Saint-Lambert	June 28, 2004	October 13, 2008	Bloc Québécois		Black Canadian (Cameroonian) First Cameroonian Canadian elected to Canadian Parliament
Bev Oda ビバリー・オダ (born 1944)	Durham	June 28, 2004	July 31, 2012	Conservative		Japanese-Canadian First Japanese Canadian elected to Canadian Parliament
Yasmin Ratansi (born 1951)	Don Valley East	June 28, 2004	May 1, 2011	Liberal		Indian-Canadian (Gujarati)
Yasmin Ratansi (born 1951)	Don Valley East	October 19, 2015	September 19, 2021	Liberal		Indian-Canadian (Gujarati)
Pablo Rodriguez (born 1967)	Honoré-Mercier	June 28, 2004	May 1, 2011	Liberal		Argentinean-Canadian First Argentinian Canadian elected to Canadian Parliament
Pablo Rodriguez (born 1967)	Honoré-Mercier	October 19, 2015	April 27, 2025	Liberal		Argentinean-Canadian First Argentinian Canadian elected to Canadian Parliament
Omar Alghabra عمر الغبرة (born 1969)	Mississauga—Erindale	January 23, 2006	October 13, 2008	Liberal		Syrian-Canadian First Syrian Canadian elected to the Canadian Parliament
Omar Alghabra عمر الغبرة (born 1969)	Mississauga Centre	October 19, 2015	April 27, 2025	Liberal		Syrian-Canadian First Syrian Canadian elected to the Canadian Parliament
André Arthur; Անդրե Արթուր (1943–2022)	Portneuf—Jacques-Cartier	January 23, 2006	May 1, 2011	Independent Conservative		Armenian-Canadian
Vivian Barbot (born 1941)	Papineau	January 23, 2006	October 13, 2008	Bloc Québécois		Black Canadian (Haitian); Barbot became the first person of a visible minority group to lead a Canadian federal political party with parliamentary representation.
Olivia Chow 鄒至蕙 (born 1957)	Trinity—Spadina	January 23, 2006	March 12, 2014	NDP		Chinese-Canadian (Cantonese)
Tony Clement; Τόνι Κλήμεντ (born 1961)	Parry Sound-Muskoka	January 23, 2006	October 20, 2019	Conservative		Syrian-Canadian; Cypriot-Canadian First Cypriot Canadian elected to Canadian Parliament; First Syrian Canadian elected to Canadian Parliament; Independent MP (2018–2019)
Sukh Dhaliwal ਸੁਖ ਧਾਲੀਵਾਲ (born 1960)	Surrey—Newton	January 23, 2006	May 1, 2011	Liberal		Indian-Canadian (Punjabi)
Sukh Dhaliwal ਸੁਖ ਧਾਲੀਵਾਲ (born 1960)	Surrey—Newton	October 19, 2015	Incumbent	Liberal		Indian-Canadian (Punjabi)
Maria Mourani ماريا موراني (born 1969)	Ahuntsic	January 23, 2006	October 19, 2015	Independent		Lebanese-Canadian; Bloc Québécois MP (2006–2013)
Ève-Mary Thaï Thi Lac (born 1972)	Saint-Hyacinthe—Bagot	September 17, 2007	May 1, 2011	Bloc Québécois		Vietnamese-Canadian First Vietnamese Canadian elected to Canadian Parliament
Devinder Shory ਦਵਿੰਦਰ ਸ਼ੋਰੀ (born 1957)	Calgary Northeast	October 14, 2008	October 18, 2015	Conservative		Indian-Canadian (Punjabi)
Tim Uppal ਟਿੰਮ ਉੱਪਲ (born 1974)	Edmonton—Sherwood Park	October 14, 2008	October 18, 2015	Conservative		Indian-Canadian (Punjabi)
Tim Uppal ਟਿੰਮ ਉੱਪਲ (born 1974)	Edmonton Gateway	October 21, 2019	Incumbent	Conservative		Indian-Canadian (Punjabi)
Alice Wong 黃陳小萍 (born 1948)	Richmond Centre	October 14, 2008	September 19, 2021	Conservative		Chinese-Canadian (Cantonese)
Paulina Ayala (born 1962)	Honoré-Mercier	May 2, 2011	October 18, 2015	NDP		Chilean-Canadian
Tyrone Benskin (born 1958)	Jeanne-Le Ber	May 2, 2011	October 18, 2015	NDP		Black Canadian
Tarik Brahmi طارق براهمي (born 1968)	Saint-Jean	May 2, 2011	October 18, 2015	NDP		Algerian-Canadian (Kabyle) First Algerian Canadian elected to Canadian Parliament
Joe Daniel ജോ ദാനിയേൽ (1954-2025)	Don Valley East	May 2, 2011	October 18, 2015	Conservative		Indian-Canadian (Malayali) First Malayali Canadian elected to Canadian Parliament
Parm Gill ਪਰਮ ਗਿੱਲ (born 1974)	Brampton—Springdale	May 2, 2011	October 18, 2015	Conservative		Indian-Canadian (Punjabi)
Parm Gill ਪਰਮ ਗਿੱਲ (born 1974)	Milton East—Halton Hills South	April 28, 2025	Incumbent	Conservative		Indian-Canadian (Punjabi)
Bal Gosal ਬਲਜੀਤ ਗੋਸਲ (born 1960)	Bramalea—Gore—Malton	May 2, 2011	October 18, 2015	Conservative		Indian-Canadian (Punjabi)
Sadia Groguhé ساديا جروغوه (born 1962)	Saint-Lambert	May 2, 2011	October 18, 2015	NDP		Black Canadian (Algerian) First Algerian Canadian elected to Canadian Parliament
Sana Hassainia سانا هاسينيا (born 1974)	Verchères—Les Patriotes	May 2, 2011	October 18, 2015	Independent		Tunisian-Canadian First Tunisian Canadian elected to Canadian Parliament; NDP MP (2011–2014)
Ted Hsu 徐正陶 (born 1964)	Kingston and the Islands	May 2, 2011	October 18, 2015	Liberal		Chinese—Canadian
Chungsen Leung 梁中心 (born 1950)	Willowdale	May 2, 2011	October 18, 2015	Conservative		Taiwanese-Canadian First Taiwanese Canadian elected to Canadian Parliament
Laurin Liu 劉舒雲 (born 1990)	Rivière-des-Mille-Îles	May 2, 2011	October 18, 2015	NDP		Chinese-Canadian (Cantonese) Youngest Visible Minority elected to Canadian Parliament
Hoang Mai (born 1973)	Brossard—La Prairie	May 2, 2011	October 18, 2015	NDP		Vietnamese-Canadian
José Núñez-Melo (born 1956)	Laval	May 2, 2011	October 18, 2015	NDP		Dominican-Canadian First Dominican Canadian elected to Canadian Parliament
Anne Minh-Thu Quach (born 1982)	Salaberry—Suroît	May 2, 2011	October 20, 2019	NDP		Vietnamese-Canadian
Jasbir Sandhu ਜਸਬੀਰ ਸੰਧੂ (born 1966)	Surrey North	May 2, 2011	October 18, 2015	NDP		Indian-Canadian (Punjabi)
Djaouida Sellah دجويدا سيلاه	Saint-Bruno—Saint-Hubert	May 2, 2011	October 18, 2015	NDP		Algerian-Canadian (Berber) First Algerian Canadian elected to Canadian Parliament
Jinny Sims ਜਿਨੀ ਸਿਮਸ (born 1952)	Newton—North Delta	May 2, 2011	October 18, 2015	NDP		Indian-Canadian (Punjabi)
Rathika Sitsabaiesan ரத்திகா சிட்சயேசியன் (born 1981)	Scarborough—Rouge River	May 2, 2011	October 18, 2015	NDP		Sri Lankan-Canadian (Tamil) First Sri Lankan Canadian elected to Canadian Parliament; First Tamil Canadian elected to Canadian Parliament
Wai Young 楊蕭慧儀 (born 1960)	Vancouver South	May 2, 2011	October 18, 2015	Conservative		Chinese-Canadian (Cantonese)
Emmanuel Dubourg (born 1958)	Bourrassa	November 25, 2013	April 27, 2025	Liberal		Black Canadian (Haitian)
Arnold Chan 陳家諾 (1967–2017)	Scarborough—Agincourt	June 30, 2014	September 14, 2017	Liberal		Chinese-Canadian (Cantonese)
Ziad Aboultaif زياد أبلتف (born 1966)	Edmonton Manning	October 19, 2015	Incumbent	Conservative		Lebanese-Canadian First Druze elected to the Canadian Parliament
Gary Anandasangaree கரி ஆனந்தசங்கரி (born 1973)	Scarborough—Guildwood—Rouge Park	October 19, 2015	Incumbent	Liberal		Sri Lankan-Canadian (Tamil)
Chandra Arya चंद्र आर्य (born 1963)	Nepean	October 19, 2015	April 27, 2025	Liberal		Indian-Canadian (Kannada); First Kannadiga Canadian elected to Canadian Parliament
Frank Baylis (born 1962)	Pierrefonds—Dollard	October 19, 2015	September 11, 2019	Liberal		Black-Canadian (Barbadian)
Ramez Ayoub رامز أيوب (born 1966)	Thérèse-De Blainville	October 19, 2015	October 20, 2019	Liberal		Syrian-Canadian
Bardish Chagger ਬਾਰਦੀਸ਼ ਚਗੇਗਰ (born 1980)	Waterloo	October 19, 2015	Incumbent	Liberal		Indian-Canadian (Punjabi)
Celina Caesar-Chavannes (born 1974)	Whitby	October 19, 2015	October 20, 2019	Liberal		Black Canadian (Grenadian) Independent MP (2019)
Shaun Chen 陳聖源 (born 1980)	Scarborough North	October 19, 2015	July 7, 2026	Liberal		Chinese-Canadian (Hakka) First Hakka Canadian elected to Canadian Parliament
Anju Dhillon ਅੰਜੂ ਢਿੱਲੋਂ (born 1979)	Dorval—Lachine—LaSalle	October 19, 2015	Incumbent	Liberal		Indian-Canadian (Punjabi)
Ali Ehsassi علی احساسی (born 1970)	Willowdale	October 19, 2015	Incumbent	Liberal		Iranian-Canadian First Iranian Canadian elected to Canadian Parliament
Fayçal El-Khoury فيصل الخوري (born 1955)	Laval—Les Îles	October 19, 2015	Incumbent	Liberal		Lebanese-Canadian
Greg Fergus (born 1969)	Hull—Aylmer	October 19, 2015	Incumbent	Liberal		Black Canadian (Montserratian)
Raj Grewal ਰਾਜ ਗਰੇਵਾਲ (born 1985)	Brampton East	October 19, 2015	October 20, 2019	Liberal		Indian-Canadian (Punjabi) Liberal MP (2015–2018)
Ahmed Hussen حمد حسين (born 1975)	York South—Weston—Etobicoke	October 19, 2015	Incumbent	Liberal		Somalian-Canadian First Somalian Canadian elected to Canadian Parliament
Majid Jowhari مجید جوهری (born 1960)	Richmond Hill	October 19, 2015	April 27, 2025	Liberal		Iranian-Canadian First Iranian Canadian elected to Canadian Parliament
Darshan Kang ਦਰਸ਼ਨ ਕਾਂਗ (born 1951)	Calgary Skyview	October 19, 2015	October 20, 2019	Independent		Indian-Canadian (Punjabi) Liberal MP (2015–2017)
Iqra Khalid اقرا خالد (born 1986)	Mississauga—Erin Mills	October 19, 2015	Incumbent	Liberal		Pakistani Canadian (Punjabi)
Kamal Khera ਕਮਲ ਖੇਰਾ (born 1988)	Brampton West	October 19, 2015	April 27, 2025	Liberal		Indian-Canadian (Punjabi)
Jenny Kwan 關慧貞 (born 1967)	Vancouver East	October 19, 2015	Incumbent	NDP		Chinese-Canadian (Cantonese)
Maryam Monsef مریم منصف (born 1985)	Peterborough—Kawartha	October 19, 2015	September 19, 2021	Liberal		Afghan-Canadian First Afghan Canadian elected to Canadian Parliament
Eva Nassif إيفا ناصيف	Vimy	October 19, 2015	October 20, 2019	Liberal		Lebanese-Canadian
Alain Rayes آلان رايس (born 1971)	Richmond—Arthabaska	October 19, 2015	April 27, 2025	Conservative		Egyptian Canadian First Egyptian Canadian Elected to Canadian Parliament; Independent MP (2023-2025)
Ruby Sahota ਰੂਬੀ ਸਹੋਤਾ (born 1979)	Brampton North—Caledon	October 19, 2015	Incumbent	Liberal		Indian-Canadian (Punjabi)
Raj Saini ਰਾਜ ਸੈਣੀ (born 1967)	Kitchener Centre	October 19, 2015	September 19, 2021	Liberal		Indian-Canadian (Punjabi)
Harjit Sajjan ਹਰਜੀਤ ਸੱਜਣ (born 1970)	Vancouver South	October 19, 2015	April 27, 2025	Liberal		Indian-Canadian (Punjabi)
Ramesh Sangha ਰਮੇਸ਼ ਸੰਘੇ (born 1945)	Brampton Centre	October 19, 2015	September 19, 2021	Liberal		Indian-Canadian (Punjabi)
Randeep Sarai ਰਣਦੀਪ ਸਰਾਏ (born 1974)	Surrey Centre	October 19, 2015	Incumbent	Liberal		Indian-Canadian (Punjabi)
Bob Saroya ਬੌਬ ਸਰੋਆ (born 1952)	Markham—Unionville	October 19, 2015	September 19, 2021	Conservative		Indian-Canadian (Punjabi)
Jati Sidhu ਜਾਤੀ ਸਿੱਧੂ (born 1952)	Mission—Matsqui—Fraser Canyon	October 19, 2015	October 20, 2019	Liberal		Indian-Canadian (Punjabi)
Sonia Sidhu ਸੋਨੀਆ ਸਿੱਧੂ (born 1968)	Brampton South	October 19, 2015	Incumbent	Liberal		Indian-Canadian (Punjabi)
Gagan Sikand ਗਗਨ ਸਿਕੰਦ (born 1984)	Mississauga—Streetsville	October 19, 2015	September 19, 2021	Liberal		Indian-Canadian (Punjabi)
Amarjeet Sohi ਅਮਰਜੀਤ ਸੋਹੀ (born 1964)	Edmonton Mill Woods	October 19, 2015	October 20, 2019	Liberal		Indian-Canadian (Punjabi)
Marwan Tabbara مروان طبارة (born 1984)	Kitchener South—Hespeler	October 19, 2015	September 19, 2021	Liberal		Lebanese-Canadian
Geng Tan 谭耕 (born 1963)	Don Valley North	October 19, 2015	October 20, 2019	Liberal		Chinese-Canadian (Mainland)
Arif Virani (born 1971)	Parkdale—High Park	October 19, 2015	April 27, 2025	Liberal		Indian-Canadian (Gujarati)
Salma Zahid سلما زاہد (born 1970)	Scarborough Centre—Don Valley East	October 19, 2015	Incumbent	Liberal		Pakistani Canadian
Mary Ng 伍鳳儀 (born 1969)	Markham—Thornhill	April 3, 2017	April 27, 2025	Liberal		Chinese-Canadian (Cantonese)
Jean Yip 葉嘉麗 (born 1968)	Scarborough—Agincourt	December 11, 2017	Incumbent	Liberal		Chinese-Canadian (Cantonese)
Jagmeet Singh ਜਗਮੀਤ ਸਿੰਘ (born 1979)	Burnaby South	February 25, 2019	April 27, 2025	NDP		Indian-Canadian (Punjabi) NDP Leader (2017–2025)
Anita Anand (born 1967)	Oakville East	October 21, 2019	Incumbent	Liberal		Indian-Canadian (Tamil & Punjabi)
Kenny Chiu 趙錦榮 (born 1965)	Steveston—Richmond East	October 21, 2019	September 19, 2021	Conservative		Chinese-Canadian (Cantonese)
Han Dong 董晗鵬 (born 1977)	Don Valley North	October 21, 2019	April 27, 2025	Liberal		Chinese-Canadian (Mainland); Independent MP (2023-2025)
Matthew Green (born 1980)	Hamilton Centre	October 21, 2019	April 27, 2025	NDP		Black Canadian
Jasraj Hallan (born 1985)	Calgary East	October 21, 2019	Incumbent	Conservative		Indian-Canadian (Punjabi)
Soraya Martinez Ferrada (born 1972)	Hochelaga	October 21, 2019	April 27, 2025	Liberal		Chilean Canadian
Jag Sahota (born 1978)	Calgary Skyview	October 21, 2019	September 19, 2021	Conservative		Indian-Canadian (Punjabi)
Nelly Shin 신윤주 (born 1972)	Port Moody—Coquitlam	October 21, 2019	September 19, 2021	Conservative		Korean-Canadian; First Korean Canadian elected to Canadian Parliament
Maninder Sidhu (born 1984)	Brampton East	October 21, 2019	Incumbent	Liberal		Indian-Canadian (Punjabi)
Sameer Zuberi سمیر زبیری (born 1979)	Pierrefonds—Dollard	October 21, 2019	Incumbent	Liberal		Pakistani Canadian
Marci Ien (born 1969)	Toronto Centre	October 26, 2020	April 27, 2025	Liberal		Black Canadian (Trinidadian)
Shafqat Ali شفقت علی (born 1965)	Brampton—Chinguacousy Park	September 20, 2021	Incumbent	Liberal		Pakistani Canadian
Parm Bains	Richmond East—Steveston	September 20, 2021	Incumbent	Liberal		Indian Canadian (Punjabi)
George Chahal (born 1975)	Calgary Skyview	September 20, 2021	April 27, 2025	Liberal		Indian Canadian (Punjabi)
Paul Chiang 蔣振宇 پال چنیو چیانگ (born 1960)	Markham—Unionville	September 20, 2021	April 27, 2025	Liberal		Chinese Canadian (Hakka)
Michael Coteau (born 1972)	Don Valley East	September 20, 2021	Incumbent	Liberal		Black Canadian (Grenadian)
Lena Diab (born 1965)	Halifax West	September 20, 2021	Incumbent	Liberal		Lebanese Canadian
Iqwinder Gaheer (born 1993)	Mississauga—Malton	September 20, 2021	Incumbent	Liberal		Indian Canadian (Punjabi)
Arielle Kayabaga (born 1991)	London West	September 20, 2021	Incumbent	Liberal		Black Canadian (Burundian)
Leslyn Lewis (born 1970)	Haldimand—Norfolk	September 20, 2021	Incumbent	Conservative		Black Canadian (Jamaican)
Wilson Miao 繆宗晏 (born 1987)	Richmond Centre	September 20, 2021	April 27, 2025	Liberal		Chinese Canadian (Cantonese)
Yasir Naqvi یاسر عباس نقوی (born 1973)	Ottawa Centre	September 20, 2021	Incumbent	Liberal		Pakistani Canadian
Taleeb Noormohamed તલીબ ફરૂક નૂર મુહમ્મદ (born 1976)	Vancouver Granville	September 20, 2021	Incumbent	Liberal		Indian Canadian (Gujarati)
Rechie Valdez (born 1980)	Mississauga—Streetsville	September 20, 2021	Incumbent	Liberal		Filipino Canadian
Kevin Vuong 王啓榮 (born 1989)	Spadina—Fort York	September 20, 2021	April 27, 2025	Independent		Vietnamese Canadian (Hoa)
Arpan Khanna (born 1990)	Oxford	June 19, 2023	Incumbent	Conservative		Indian Canadian (Punjabi)
Shuv Majumdar শুভালয় মজুমদার (born 1979)	Calgary Heritage	July 24, 2023	Incumbent	Conservative		Indian Canadian (Bengali)
Jamil Jivani (born 1987)	Bowmanville—Oshawa North	March 4, 2024	Incumbent	Conservative		Black Canadian (Kenyan)
Sima Acan	Oakville West	April 28, 2025	Incumbent	Liberal		Turkish Canadian
Fares Al Soud	Mississauga Centre	April 28, 2025	Incumbent	Liberal		Palestinian Canadian
Chak Au	Richmond Centre—Marpole	April 28, 2025	Incumbent	Conservative		Chinese Canadian (Cantonese)
Karim Bardeesy	Taiaiko'n—Parkdale—High Park	April 28, 2025	Incumbent	Liberal		Egyptian Canadian
Wade Chang	Burnaby Central	April 28, 2025	Incumbent	Liberal		Taiwanese-Canadian
Maggie Chi	Don Valley North	April 28, 2025	Incumbent	Liberal		Chinese Canadian
Sandra Cobena	Newmarket—Aurora	April 28, 2025	Incumbent	Conservative		Ecuadorian Canadian
Amanpreet Gill	Calgary Skyview	April 28, 2025	Incumbent	Conservative		Indian Canadian (Punjabi)
Amarjeet Gill	Brampton West	April 28, 2025	Incumbent	Conservative		Indian Canadian (Punjabi)
Dalwinder Gill	Calgary McKnight	April 28, 2025	Incumbent	Conservative		Indian Canadian (Punjabi)
Harb Gill	Windsor West	April 28, 2025	Incumbent	Conservative		Indian Canadian (Punjabi)
Sukhman Gill	Abbotsford—South Langley	April 28, 2025	Incumbent	Conservative		Indian Canadian (Punjabi)
Vincent Ho	Richmond Hill South	April 28, 2025	Incumbent	Conservative		Chinese Canadian
Michael Ma	Markham—Unionville	April 28, 2025	Incumbent	Liberal		Chinese Canadian (Cantonese)
Marjorie Michel	Papineau	April 28, 2025	Incumbent	Liberal		Black Canadian (Haitian)
Juanita Nathan	Pickering—Brooklin	April 28, 2025	Incumbent	Liberal		Sri Lankan Canadian (Tamil)
Chi Nguyen	Spadina—Harbourfront	April 28, 2025	Incumbent	Liberal		Vietnamese Canadian
Bienvenu-Olivier Ntumba	Mont-Saint-Bruno—L'Acadie	April 28, 2025	Incumbent	Liberal		Black Canadian
Aslam Rana	Hamilton Centre	April 28, 2025	Incumbent	Liberal		Pakistani Canadian
Gurbux Saini	Fleetwood—Port Kells	April 28, 2025	Incumbent	Liberal		Indian Canadian (Punjabi)
Abdelhaq Sari	Bourassa	April 28, 2025	Incumbent	Liberal		Moroccan Canadian
Jagsharan Singh Mahal	Edmonton Southeast	April 28, 2025	Incumbent	Conservative		Indian Canadian (Punjabi)
Amandeep Sodhi	Brampton Centre	April 28, 2025	Incumbent	Liberal		Indian Canadian (Punjabi)
Tatiana Auguste	Terrebonne	April 13, 2026	Incumbent	Liberal		Haitian Canadian
Doly Begum	Scarborough Southwest	April 13, 2026	Incumbent	Liberal		Bangladeshi Canadian
Tanveer Shahnawaz	Beaches—East York	August 31, 2026	Incumbent	Liberal		Bangladeshi Canadian

=== Senate ===
Senator	Province	Took office	Left office	Party	Ref.	Note
Michael Basha مايكل باشا (1896–1976)	Newfoundland and Labrador	January 24, 1951	November 18, 1976	Liberal		Lebanese-Canadian
Anne Cools (born 1943)	Ontario	January 13, 1984	August 12, 2018	Independent Conservative		Black Canadian (Barbadian) First Black Canadian Appointed to the Senate; First Caribbean Canadian Appointed to the Senate; Conservative Senator (2004–2007); Liberal Senator (1984–2004)
Pierre de Bané بيير دي باين (1938–2019)	Quebec	June 29, 1984	August 22, 2013	Liberal		Lebanese-Canadian Federal MP (1968–1984)
Donald Oliver (born 1938)	Nova Scotia	September 7, 1990	November 16, 2013	Conservative		Black Canadian
Calvin Ruck (1925–2004)	Nova Scotia	June 11, 1998	September 4, 2000	Liberal		Black Canadian
Vivienne Poy 利德蕙 (born 1941)	Ontario	September 17, 1998	September 17, 2012	Liberal		Chinese-Canadian (Cantonese) First Chinese Canadian appointed to the Senate
Raymond Setlakwe; Ռեյմոնդ Սեթլաքու (1928–2021)	Quebec	June 20, 2000	July 3, 2003	Liberal		Armenian-Canadian First Armenian Canadian Appointed to the Senate
Mobina Jaffer 𑈤𑈯𑈡𑈮𑈞𑈬 𑈐𑈬𑈠𑈦 (born 1949)	British Columbia	June 13, 2001	Incumbent	Independent (ISG)		Indian-Canadian (Ugandian/Khoja); First Indo Canadian Appointed to the Senate; First Ugandan Canadian Appointed to the Senate; First Muslim appointed to the Senate Liberal Senator (2001–2018)
Mac Harb مش حرب (born 1953)	Ontario	September 9, 2003	August 26, 2013	Liberal		Lebanese-Canadian Federal MP (1988–2003)
Lillian Dyck 莉蓮·戴克 (born 1945)	Saskatchewan	March 24, 2005	August 24, 2020	Liberal		Chinese-Canadian NDP Senator (2005–2009)
Yonah Martin 요나 마틴 (born 1965)	British Columbia	January 2, 2009	Incumbent	Conservative		Korean-Canadian First Korean Canadian appointed to the Senate; Deputy Opposition Senate House Leader (2015–present)
Vim Kochhar विम कोचर (born 1935)	Ontario	January 29, 2010	September 21, 2011	Conservative		Indian-Canadian (Punjabi) First Hindu appointed to the Senate
Salma Ataullahjan سلما عطاءاللہ جان (born 1952)	Ontario	July 9, 2010	Incumbent	Conservative		Pakistani Canadian First Pakistani Canadian appointed to the Senate
Don Meredith (born 1964)	Ontario	December 18, 2010	May 9, 2017	Independent		Black Canadian (Jamaican) Conservative Senator (2010–2015)
Asha Seth आशा सेठ (born 1947)	Ontario	January 6, 2012	December 15, 2014	Conservative		Indian-Canadian (Hindustani)
Thanh Hai Ngo; Ngô Thanh Hải (born 1947)	Ontario	September 6, 2012	January 3, 2022	Conservative		Vietnamese-Canadian First Vietnamese Canadian appointed to the Senate
Tobias Enverga (1955–2017)	Ontario	September 6, 2012	November 16, 2017	Conservative		Filipino-Canadian First Filipino Canadian appointed to the Senate
Victor Oh 胡子修 (born 1949)	Ontario	January 25, 2013	Incumbent	Conservative		Singaporean-Canadian (Chinese) First Singaporean Canadian appointed to the Senate
Ratna Omidvar ਰਤਨਾ ਓਮੀਦਵਰ (born 1949)	Ontario	April 1, 2016	Incumbent	Independent (ISG)		Indian-Canadian (Punjabi)
Wanda Thomas Bernard (born 1953)	Nova Scotia	November 10, 2016	Incumbent	Progressive		Black Canadian (Black Nova Scotian)
Sabi Marwah ਮਾਰਵਾਹ (born 1951)	Ontario	November 10, 2016	September 7, 2023	Independent (ISG)		Indian-Canadian (Punjabi)
Yuen Pau Woo 胡元豹 (born 1963)	Ontario	November 10, 2016	Incumbent	Independent (ISG)		Singaporean-Canadian (Chinese)
Rosa Galvez (born 1961)	Quebec	November 25, 2016	Incumbent	Independent (ISG)		Peruvian-Canadian First Peruvian Canadian appointed to the Senate
Marie-Françoise Mégie (born 1950)	Quebec	November 25, 2016	Incumbent	Independent (ISG)		Black Canadian (Haitian)
Mohamed-Iqbal Ravalia محمد اقبال روالیہ (born 1957)	Newfoundland and Labrador	June 1, 2018	Incumbent	Independent (ISG)		Indian-Canadian (Zimbabwean) First Zimbabwean Canadian appointed to the Senate
Rosemary Moodie (born 1956)	Ontario	December 12, 2018	Incumbent	Independent (ISG)		Black Canadian (Jamaican)
Hassan Yussuff (born 1957)	Ontario	June 22, 2021	Incumbent	Independent (ISG)		Guyanese-Canadian
Amina Gerba (born 1961)	Quebec	July 29, 2021	Incumbent	Progressive		Black Canadian (Cameroonian)
Flordeliz "Gigi" Osler (born 1968)	Manitoba	September 26, 2022	Incumbent	Independent (CSG)		Indian-Canadian and Filipino-Canadian
Sharon Burey (born 1957)	Ontario	November 21, 2022	Incumbent	Independent (ISG)		Black Canadian (Jamaican)
Andrew Cardozo एन्ड्रू कर्दोज़ो (born 1956)	Ontario	November 21, 2022	Incumbent	Progressive		Indian-Canadian (Goan)
Bernadette Clement (born 1965)	Ontario	June 24, 2023	Incumbent	Independent (ISG)		Black Canadian (Trinidadian)

== Provincial ==
=== Alberta ===
Member of Legislative Assembly	Riding	Took office	Left office	Party	Ref.	Note
George Ho Lem 何榮禧 (1918–2005)	Calgary-McCall	August 30, 1971	March 25, 1975	Social Credit		Chinese-Canadian (Cantonese) First Visible Minority elected to the Alberta Legislature; First Chinese-Canadian elected to the Alberta Legislature
Larry Shaben لاري شبين (1935–2008)	Lesser Slave Lake	March 26, 1975	March 19, 1989	Conservative		Lebanese-Canadian First Muslim elected to the Alberta Legislature; First Lebanese Canadian elected to the Alberta Legislature; First Conservative Visible Minority elected to the Alberta Legislature
Henry Woo 胡建華 (1929–2014)	Edmonton-Sherwood Park	March 14, 1979	May 7, 1986	Conservative		Chinese-Canadian (Cantonese)
Moe Amery مو أمري (born 1954)	Calgary-East	June 15, 1993	May 4, 2015	Conservative		Lebanese-Canadian
Sine Chadi توقيع عصا (born 1956)	Edmonton Roper	June 15, 1993	March 10, 1997	Liberal		Lebanese-Canadian First Liberal Visible Minority elected to Alberta Legislature
Gary Mar 馬健威 (born 1962)	Calgary Mackay	June 15, 1993	September 27, 2007	Conservative		Chinese-Canadian (Cantonese)
Hung Pham; Phạm Kim Hưng (born 1963)	Calgary-Montrose	June 15, 1993	March 3, 2008	Conservative		Vietnamese-Canadian First Vietnamese Canadian elected to the Alberta Legislature
Harry Sohal ਹਰਿੰਦਰ ਸੋਹਲ (1946–1994)	Calgary McCall	June 15, 1993	November 15, 1994	Conservative		Indian-Canadian (Punjabi) First Indo-Canadian elected to Alberta Legislature; First Sikh elected to Alberta Legislature
Shiraz Shariff شیراز شیرف (born 1954)	Calgary McCall	April 20, 1995	March 3, 2008	Conservative		Indian-Canadian (Gujarati) First Tanzanian Canadian elected to Alberta Legislature
Wayne Cao; Nguyễn Cảo (born 1946)	Calgary-Fort	March 11, 1997	May 4, 2015	Conservative		Vietnamese-Canadian
Raj Pannu ਰਾਜ ਪੰਨਾ (1934–2025)	Edmonton-Strathcona	March 11, 1997	March 3, 2008	NDP		Indian-Canadian (Punjabi) First Visible Minority to lead a political party in the Alberta Legislature; First NDP Visible Minority elected to Alberta Legislature
Bharat Agnihotri ਭਾਰਤ ਅਗਨੀਹੋਤਰੀ (born 1971)	Edmonton Ellerslie	November 22, 2004	March 3, 2008	Liberal		Indian-Canadian (Punjabi)
Mo Elsalhy مو السالحي (born 1953)	Edmonton McClung	November 22, 2004	March 3, 2008	Liberal		Egyptian-Canadian First Egyptian Canadian elected to Alberta Legislature
George Rogers (born 1958)	Leduc-Beaumont	November 22, 2004	May 4, 2015	Conservative		Black Canadian (Jamaican) First Black Canadian elected to Alberta Legislature; First Caribbean-Canadian elected to Alberta Legislature
Nareshindra Bhardwaj नरेशिन्द्र भारद्वाज (born 1959)	Edmonton-Ellerslie	March 3, 2008	May 4, 2015	Conservative		Indian-Canadian (Hindustani)
Carl Benito (born 1954)	Edmonton-Mill Woods	March 3, 2008	April 22, 2012	Conservative		Filipino-Canadian First Filipino Canadian elected to the Alberta Legislature
Manmeet Bhullar ਮਨਮੀਤ ਭੁੱਲਰ (1980–2015)	Calgary-Greenway	March 3, 2008	November 23, 2015	Conservative		Indian-Canadian (Punjabi)
Lindsay Blackett (born 1961)	Calgary-North West	March 3, 2008	April 22, 2012	Conservative		Black Canadian (Barbadian)
Darshan Kang ਦਰਸ਼ਨ ਕਾਂਗ (born 1953)	Calgary-McCall	March 3, 2008	May 4, 2015	Liberal		Indian-Canadian (Punjabi) Federal MP (2015–present)
Stephen Khan سٹیفن خان (born 1966)	St. Albert	March 3, 2008	May 4, 2015	Conservative		Pakistani-Canadian First Pakistani Canadian elected to Alberta Legislature
Peter Sandhu ਪੀਟਰ ਸੰਧੂ (born 1960)	Edmonton-Manning	March 3, 2008	May 4, 2015	Conservative		Indian-Canadian (Punjabi)
Raj Sherman राज शेरमेन (born 1965)	Edmonton-Meadowlark	March 3, 2008	May 4, 2015	Liberal		Indian-Canadian (Rajasthani) First Visible Minority to lead the Alberta Liberal Party; First Hindu to lead a Canadian Political Party; Conservative MLA (2008–2010)
Teresa Woo-Paw 鮑胡嫈儀 (born 1958)	Calgary-Northern Hills	March 3, 2008	May 4, 2015	Conservative		Chinese-Canadian (Cantonese) First Female Visible Minority elected to Alberta Legislature
David Xiao 蕭輝 (born 1960)	Edmonton-McClung	March 3, 2008	May 4, 2015	Conservative		Chinese-Canadian (Mainland)
Jason Luan 賈普生 (born 1963)	Calgary-Hawkwood	April 23, 2012	May 4, 2015	Conservative		Chinese-Canadian (Mainland)
Jason Luan 賈普生 (born 1963)	Calgary-Foothills	April 16, 2019	May 28, 2023	Conservative		Chinese-Canadian (Mainland)
Sohail Quadri سہیل قادری (born 1971)	Edmonton-Mill Woods	April 23, 2012	May 4, 2015	Conservative		Pakistani-Canadian
Leela Sharon Aheer లీలా శారణ అహీర (born 1970)	Chestermere-Rocky View	May 5, 2015	May 28, 2023	Conservative		Indian-Canadian (Telugu) First Wildrose Visible Minority elected to Alberta Legislature (of 2); Deputy Leader of the United Conservatives (2017–present); Wildrose MLA (2015–2017)
Estefania Cortes-Vargas (born 1991)	Strathcona-Sherwood Park	May 5, 2015	April 15, 2019	NDP		Colombian-Canadian First Colombian Canadian elected to Alberta Legislature; First LGBT Visible Minority elected in Canada
Thomas Dang (born 1995)	Edmonton-South West	May 5, 2015	May 28, 2023	NDP		Vietnamese Canadian Youngest Visible Minority elected to Alberta Legislature
Anam Kazim انام کاظم (born 1986)	Calgary-Glenmore	May 5, 2015	April 15, 2019	NDP		Pakistani-Canadian
Rod Loyola (born 1974)	Edmonton-Ellerslie	May 5, 2015	Incumbent	NDP		Chilean-Canadian First Chilean Canadian elected to Alberta Legislature
Ricardo Miranda (born 1976)	Calgary-Cross	May 5, 2015	April 15, 2019	NDP		Nicaraguan-Canadian First Nicaraguan Canadian elected to Alberta Legislature; First LGBT Visible Minority elected in Canada
Irfan Sabir عرفان صابر (born 1977)	Calgary-McCall	May 5, 2015	Incumbent	NDP		Pakistani-Canadian
David Shepherd (born 1973)	Edmonton-City Centre	May 5, 2015	Incumbent	NDP		Black Canadian
Tany Yao 譚瑤 (born 1970)	Fort McMurray-Wood Buffalo	May 5, 2015	Incumbent	Conservative		Filipino Canadian; Japanese Canadian First Wildrose Visible Minority elected to Alberta Legislature (of 2); Wildrose MLA (2015–2017); First Japanese Canadian elected to Alberta Legislature
Prasad Panda ప్రసాద్ పాండా (born 1962)	Calgary-Foothillsthen Calgary-Edgemont	September 3, 2015	May 28, 2023	Conservative		Indian-Canadian (Telugu); Wildrose MLA (2015–2017)
Prab Gill ਪ੍ਰਭਦੀਪ ਗਿੱਲ	Calgary-Greenway	March 22, 2016	April 15, 2019	Conservative		Indian-Canadian (Punjabi) Deputy Opposition Whip (2017–2019)
Mickey Amery (born 1982)	Calgary-Cross	April 17, 2019	Incumbent	Conservative		Lebanese-Canadian
Jasvir Deol	Edmonton-Meadows	April 17, 2019	Incumbent	NDP		Indian-Canadian (Punjabi)
Kaycee Madu	Edmonton-South West	April 17, 2019	May 28, 2023	Conservative		Black Canadian (Nigerian)
Rakhi Pancholi (born 1977)	Edmonton-Whitemud	April 17, 2019	Incumbent	NDP		Indian-Canadian (Hindavi)
Josephine Pon	Calgary-Beddington	April 17, 2019	May 28, 2023	Conservative		Chinese-Canadian (Cantonese)
Rajan Sawhney (born 1971)	Calgary-North East then Calgary-North West	April 17, 2019	Incumbent	Conservative		Indian-Canadian (Punjabi)
Peter Singh	Calgary-East	April 17, 2019	Incumbent	Conservative		Fijian-Canadian (Indian) First Fijian-Canadian elected to Alberta Legislature
Devinder Toor	Calgary-Falconridge	April 17, 2019	May 28, 2023	Conservative		Indian-Canadian (Punjabi)
Muhammad Yaseen محمد یٰس	Calgary-North	April 17, 2019	Incumbent	Conservative		Pakistani-Canadian
Sharif Haji	Edmonton-Decore	May 29, 2023	Incumbent	NDP		Somali-Canadian
Rhiannon Hoyle	Edmonton-South	May 29, 2023	Incumbent	NDP		Black Canadian (Trinidadian)
Nathan Ip	Edmonton-South West	May 29, 2023	Incumbent	NDP		Taiwanese-Canadian
Samir Kayande (born 1972)	Calgary-Elbow	May 29, 2023	Incumbent	NDP		Indian-Canadian
Parmeet Singh Boparai	Calgary-Falconridge	May 29, 2023	Incumbent	NDP		Indian-Canadian(Punjabi)
Nagwan Al-Guneid	Calgary-Glenmore	May 29, 2023	Incumbent	NDP		Yemeni-Canadian
Lizette Tejada	Calgary-Klein	May 29, 2023	Incumbent	NDP		Salvadoran-Canadian
Gurinder Brar	Calgary-North East	May 29, 2023	Incumbent	NDP		Indian-Canadian(Punjabi)
Sarah Elmeligi (born 1976)	Banff-Kananaskis	May 29, 2023	Incumbent	NDP		Egyptian-Canadian
Rob Miyashiro (born 1960)	Lethbridge-West	December 18, 2024	Incumbent	NDP		Japanese-Canadian
Gurtej Singh Brar	Edmonton-Strathcona	June 23, 2025	Incumbent	NDP		Indian Canadian (Punjabi)
Naheed Nenshi (born 1972)	Edmonton-Ellerslie	June 23, 2025	Incumbent	NDP		Tanzanian Canadian (Gujarati)

=== British Columbia ===
Member of Legislative Assembly	Riding	Took office	Left office	Party	Ref.	Note
James W. Douglas (1851–1883)	Victoria City	1875	1878	Independent		Black Canadian
George Mussallem (1908–2007)	Dewdney	1966	1972	Social Credit		Lebanese-Canadian
George Mussallem (1908–2007)	Dewdney	1975	1983	Social Credit		Lebanese-Canadian
Emery Barnes (1929–1998)	Vancouver-Burrard	August 30, 1972	May 27, 1996	NDP		Black Canadian (African-American) First Black Canadian elected to the British Columbia Legislature
Rosemary Brown (1930–2003)	Burnaby-Edmonds	August 30, 1972	October 21, 1986	NDP		Black Canadian (Jamaican) First Black Canadian and Visible Minority woman elected to the British Columbia Legislature
Moe Sihota (born 1955)	Esquimalt-Metchosin	October 22, 1986	May 15, 2001	NDP		Indian-Canadian (Punjabi) First Indo-Canadian elected to the British Columbia Legislature; First Sikh elected to the British Columbia Legislature
Ujjal Dosanjh ਉੱਜਲ ਦੇਵ ਸਿੰਘ ਦੁਸਾਂਝ (born 1947)	Vancouver-Kensington	October 17, 1991	May 15, 2001	NDP		Indian-Canadian (Punjabi); Federal MP (2004–2011); First Visible Minority Premier of British Columbia
Harry Lali (born 1956)	Yale-Lillooet	October 17, 1991	May 15, 2001	NDP		Indian-Canadian (Punjabi)
Harry Lali (born 1956)	Fraser-Nicola	May 17, 2005	May 13, 2013	NDP		Indian-Canadian (Punjabi)
Judi Tyabji جودی طیبجی (born 1965)	Okanagan East	October 17, 1991	May 27, 1996	Progressive Democratic Alliance		Indian-Canadian (Anglo-Bohra) BCL MLA (1991–1993)
Ida Chong 張杏芳 (born 1956)	Oak Bay-Gordon Head	May 28, 1996	May 13, 2013	BC Liberal		Chinese-Canadian (Cantonese) First Chinese Canadian elected to the British Columbia Legislature
Sindi Hawkins (1958–2010)	Kelowna-Mission	May 28, 1996	May 11, 2009	BC Liberal		Indian-Canadian (Punjabi)
Jenny Kwan 關慧貞 (born 1967)	Vancouver-Mount Pleasant	May 28, 1996	August 4, 2015	NDP		Chinese-Canadian (Cantonese) First Chinese Canadian elected to the British Columbia Legislature; Federal MP (2015–present)
Tony Bhullar	Surrey-Newton	May 16, 2001	May 16, 2005	BC Liberal		Indian-Canadian (Punjabi)
Dave Hayer (born 1958)	Surrey-Tynehead	May 16, 2001	May 13, 2013	BC Liberal		Indian-Canadian (Punjabi)
Richard Lee 李燦明 (born 1954)	Burnaby North	May 16, 2001	May 8, 2017	BC Liberal		Chinese-Canadian (Mainland)
Karn Manhas (born 1976)	Port Coquitlam-Burke Mountain	May 16, 2001	May 16, 2005	BC Liberal		Indian-Canadian (Punjabi) Youngest person ever elected to the British Columbia Legislature
Rob Nijjar (born 1967)	Vancouver-Kingsway	May 16, 2001	May 16, 2005	BC Liberal		Indian-Canadian (Punjabi)
John Nuraney (1937–2016)	Burnaby-Willingdon	May 16, 2001	May 11, 2009	BC Liberal		Indian-Canadian (Kenyan) First Kenyan Canadian elected to the British Columbia Legislature
Patty Sahota (1969–2024)	Burnaby-Edmonds	May 16, 2001	May 16, 2005	BC Liberal		Indian-Canadian (Punjabi)
Gulzar Singh Cheema (born 1954)	Surrey-Panorama Ridge	May 16, 2001	May 23, 2004	BC Liberal		Indian-Canadian (Punjabi)
Patrick Wong 黃耀華 (born 1949)	Vancouver-Kensington	May 16, 2001	May 16, 2005	BC Liberal		Chinese-Canadian (Cantonese)
Jagrup Brar (born 1957)	Surrey-Fleetwood	October 28, 2004	May 13, 2013	NDP		Indian-Canadian (Punjabi)
Jagrup Brar (born 1957)	Surrey-Fleetwood	May 9, 2017	Incumbent	NDP		Indian-Canadian (Punjabi)
Harry Bains (born 1951)	Surrey-Newton	May 17, 2005	October 18, 2024	NDP		Indian-Canadian (Punjabi)
Raj Chouhan	Burnaby-New Westminster	May 17, 2005	Incumbent	NDP		Indian-Canadian (Punjabi)
Wally Oppal (born 1940)	Vancouver-Fraserview	May 17, 2005	May 11, 2009	BC Liberal		Indian-Canadian (Punjabi)
John Yap 葉志明 (born 1959)	Richmond-Steveston	May 17, 2005	October 23, 2020	BC Liberal		Singaporean-Canadian (Chinese) First Singaporean Canadian elected to the British Columbia Legislature
Mable Elmore (born 1969)	Vancouver-Kensington	May 12, 2009	Incumbent	NDP		Filipino-Canadian First Filipino Canadian elected to the British Columbia Legislature
Kash Heed (born 1955)	Vancouver-Fraserview	May 12, 2009	May 13, 2013	BC Liberal		Indian-Canadian (Punjabi)
Naomi Yamamoto (born 1960)	North Vancouver-Lonsdale	May 12, 2009	May 8, 2017	BC Liberal		Japanese-Canadian First Japanese Canadian elected to the British Columbia Legislature
Doug Bing (born 1950)	Maple Ridge-Pitt Meadows	May 14, 2013	May 8, 2017	BC Liberal		Chinese-Canadian (Cantonese)
Jane Shin 신재경 (born 1980)	Burnaby-Lougheed	May 14, 2013	May 8, 2017	NDP		Korean-Canadian First Korean Canadian elected to the British Columbia Legislature
Teresa Wat 屈潔冰 (born 1950)	Richmond-Bridgeport	May 14, 2013	Incumbent	Conservative		Chinese-Canadian (Cantonese) BC Liberal MLA (2013-2024)
Amrik Virk (born 1963)	Surrey-Tynehead	May 14, 2013	May 8, 2017	BC Liberal		Indian-Canadian (Punjabi)
Katrina Chen 陳葦蓁 (born 1983)	Burnaby-Lougheed	May 9, 2017	October 18, 2024	NDP		Taiwanese-Canadian
George Chow 周烱華 (born 1951)	Vancouver-Fraserview	May 9, 2017	Incumbent	NDP		Chinese-Canadian (Cantonese)
Jas Johal	Richmond-Queensborough	May 9, 2017	October 23, 2020	BC Liberal		Indian-Canadian (Punjabi)
Ravi Kahlon (born 1979)	Delta North	May 9, 2017	Incumbent	NDP		Indian-Canadian (Punjabi)
Anne Kang 康安禮 (born 1977)	Burnaby Centre	May 9, 2017	Incumbent	NDP		Taiwanese-Canadian
Michael Lee 李耀華	Vancouver-Langara	May 9, 2017	October 18, 2024	BC United		Chinese-Canadian (Cantonese)
Bowinn Ma (born 1985)	North Vancouver-Lonsdale	May 9, 2017	Incumbent	NDP		Taiwanese-Canadian
Jinny Sims (born 1952)	Surrey-Panorama	May 9, 2017	October 18, 2024	NDP		Indian-Canadian (Punjabi)
Rachna Singh (born 1972)	Surrey-Green Timbers	May 9, 2017	October 18, 2024	NDP		Indian-Canadian (Punjabi)
Harwinder Sandhu	Vernon-Monashee	October 24, 2020	Incumbent	NDP		Indian-Canadian (Punjabi)
Niki Sharma	Vancouver-Hastings	October 24, 2020	Incumbent	NDP		Indian-Canadian (Punjabi)
Aman Singh	Richmond-Queensborough	October 24, 2020	October 18, 2024	NDP		Indian-Canadian (Punjabi)
Henry Yao 姚君憲	Richmond South Centre	October 24, 2020	October 18, 2024	NDP		Taiwanese-Canadian
Ravi Parmar (born 1994)	Langford-Juan de Fuca	June 24, 2023	Incumbent	NDP		Indian Canadian (Punjabi)
George Anderson	Nanaimo-Lantzville	October 19, 2024	Incumbent	NDP		Black Canadian
Reah Arora	Burnaby East	October 19, 2024	Incumbent	NDP		Indian Canadian (Punjabi)
Harman Bhangu	Langley-Abbotsford	October 19, 2024	Incumbent	Conservative		Indian Canadian (Punjabi)
Hon Chan 陳瀚生 (born 1987)	Richmond Centre	October 19, 2024	Incumbent	Independent		Chinese Canadian (Cantonese)
Paul Choi	Burnaby South-Metrotown	October 19, 2024	Incumbent	NDP		Korean Canadian
Mandeep Dhaliwal	Surrey North	October 19, 2024	Incumbent	Conservative		Indian Canadian (Punjabi)
Sunita Dhir (born 1971)	Vancouver-Langara	October 19, 2024	Incumbent	NDP		Indian Canadian (Punjabi)
Reann Gasper	Abbotsford-Mission	October 19, 2024	August 22, 2026	Conservative		Black Canadian (Trinidadian)
Steve Kooner	Richmond-Queensborough	October 19, 2024	Incumbent	Conservative		Indian Canadian (Punjabi)
Lawrence Mok	Maple Ridge East	October 19, 2024	Incumbent	Conservative		Chinese Canadian (Singaporean)
Amna Shah	Surrey City Centre	October 19, 2024	Incumbent	NDP		Malaysian Canadian
Jessie Sunner	Surrey-Newton	October 19, 2024	Incumbent	NDP		Indian Canadian (Punjabi)
Jody Toor	Langley-Willowbrook	October 19, 2024	Incumbent	Conservative		Indian Canadian (Punjabi)
Debra Toporowski	Cowichan Valley	October 19, 2024	Incumbent	NDP		Chinese Canadian
Terry Yung 楊子亮	Vancouver-Yaletown	October 19, 2024	Incumbent	NDP		Chinese Canadian (Cantonese)

=== Manitoba ===
Member of Legislative Assembly	Riding	Took office	Left office	Party	Ref.	Note
Conrad Santos (1934–2016)	Burrows	November 17, 1981	April 25, 1988	NDP		Filipino Canadian First Visible Minority elected to Manitoba Legislature; First Filipino Canadian elected to Manitoba Legislature
Conrad Santos (1934–2016)	Wellington	September 11, 1990	May 21, 2007	NDP		Filipino Canadian First Visible Minority elected to Manitoba Legislature; First Filipino Canadian elected to Manitoba Legislature
Gulzar Singh Cheema (born 1954)	The Maples	April 26, 1988	June 17, 1993	Liberal		Indian Canadian (Punjabi) First Indo-Canadian elected to Manitoba Legislature; First Liberal Visible Minority elected to Manitoba Legislature; First Sikh elected to Manitoba Legislature; MLA British Columbia Legislative Assembly (2001–2004)
Cris Aglugub (born 1942)	The Maples	September 21, 1999	May 21, 2007	NDP		Filipino Canadian
Bidhu Jha (born 1942)	Radisson	June 3, 2003	April 18, 2016	NDP		Indian Canadian (Hindavi) First Hindu elected to the Manitoba Legislature
Flor Marcelino (born 1951)	Logan	May 22, 2007	September 9, 2019	NDP		Filipino Canadian First Visible Minority female elected to Manitoba Legislature; Leader of the Manitoba NDP (2016–2017)
Mohinder Saran	The Maples	May 22, 2007	September 9, 2019	Independent		Indian Canadian (Punjabi) NDP MLA (2007–2016)
Ted Marcelino	Tyndall Park	October 4, 2011	September 9, 2019	NDP		Filipino Canadian
Jon Reyes	St. Norbert	April 19, 2016	August 12, 2019	Conservative		Filipino Canadian
Jon Reyes	Waverley	September 10, 2019	September 5, 2023	Conservative		Filipino Canadian
Uzoma Asagwara (born 1984)	Union Station	September 10, 2019	Incumbent	NDP		Black Canadian (Nigerian)
Diljeet Brar	Burrows	September 10, 2019	Incumbent	NDP		Indian Canadian (Punjabi)
Audrey Gordon	Southdale	September 10, 2019	September 5, 2023	Conservative		Black Canadian (Jamaican)
Malaya Marcelino	Notre Dame	September 10, 2019	Incumbent	NDP		Filipino Canadian
Jamie Moses	St. Vital	September 10, 2019	Incumbent	NDP		Black Canadian
Mintu Sandhu	The Maples	September 10, 2019	Incumbent	NDP		Indian Canadian (Punjabi)
Ibrahim Obby Khan ابراہیم خان (born 1980)	Fort Whyte	March 22, 2022	Incumbent	Conservative		Pakistani Canadian First Pakistani Canadian elected to the Manitoba Legislature First Muslim elected to Manitoba Legislature
Nellie Kennedy	Assiniboia	October 3, 2023	Incumbent	NDP		Lebanese Canadian First Lebanese Canadian elected to the Manitoba Legislature
Jennifer Chen	Fort Richmond	October 3, 2023	Incumbent	NDP		Chinese Canadian First Chinese Canadian elected to the Manitoba Legislature
Jelynn Dela Cruz (born 1999)	Radisson	October 3, 2023	Incumbent	NDP		Filipino Canadian
Jasdeep Devgan	McPhillips	October 5, 2023	Incumbent	NDP		Indian Canadian (Punjabi)

=== New Brunswick ===
Member of Legislative Assembly	Riding	Took office	Left office	Party	Ref.	Note
Tania Sodhi	Moncton Northwest	October 21, 2024	Incumbent	Liberal		Indian Canadian (Punjabi) First Visible Minority elected to New Brunswick Legislature; First Indo-Canadian elected to the New Brunswick Legislature

=== Newfoundland and Labrador ===
Member of Legislative Assembly	Riding	Took office	Left office	Party	Ref.	Note
Lorraine Michael (born 1943)	St. John's East-Quidi Vidi	November 1, 2006	May 16, 2019	NDP		Lebanese-Canadian First Visible Minority elected to Newfoundland and Labrador Legislature; First Lebanese Canadian elected to the Newfoundland and Labrador Legislature; NDP Leader (2006–2015)

=== Northwest Territories ===
Member of Legislative Assembly	Riding	Took office	Left office	Party	Ref.	Note
Peter Baker (1887–1973)	Mackenzie North	March 31, 1964	July 3, 1967	Independent		Lebanese-Canadian First Visible Minority elected to NWT Legislature; First Lebanese Canadian elected to NWT Legislature
Kelvin Ng (born 1958)	Kitikmeot	October 16, 1995	December 6, 1999	Independent		Chinese-Canadian (Cantonese) First Chinese Canadian elected to NWT Legislature; Nunavut MLA (1999–2004)
Sandy Lee (born 1964)	Range Lake	December 6, 1999	March 26, 2011	Independent		Korean-Canadian First Korean Canadian elected to NWT Legislature

=== Nova Scotia ===
Member of Legislative Assembly	Riding	Took office	Left office	Party	Ref.	Note
Wayne Adams (born 1943)	Preston	May 25, 1993	March 23, 1998	Liberal		Black Canadian First Black Canadian elected to the Nova Scotia Legislative Assembly
Yvonne Atwell (born 1943)	Preston	March 24, 1998	July 26, 1999	NDP		Black Canadian
Percy Paris	Waverley-Fall River-Beaver Bank	June 13, 2006	October 7, 2013	NDP		Black Canadian
Leonard Preyra (born 1955)	Halifax Citadel-Sable Island	June 13, 2006	October 7, 2013	NDP		Indian Canadian
Patricia Arab	Fairview-Clayton Park	October 8, 2013	November 25, 2024	Liberal		Lebanese Canadian
Lena Diab (born 1965)	Halifax Armdale	October 8, 2013	August 16, 2021	Liberal		Lebanese Canadian
Stephen Gough	Sackville-Beaver Bank	October 8, 2013	May 29, 2017	Liberal		Black Canadian
Tony Ince (born 1958)	Cole Harbour-Portland Valley	October 8, 2013	November 25, 2024	Liberal		Black Canadian
Rafah DiCostanzo (born 1962)	Clayton Park West	May 30, 2017	November 25, 2024	Liberal		Iraqi Canadian
Ali Duale	Halifax Armdale	August 17, 2021	November 25, 2024	Liberal		Black Canadian (Somali)
Suzy Hansen (born 1979)	Halifax Needham	August 17, 2021	Incumbent	NDP		Black Canadian
Angela Simmonds (born 1975)	Preston	August 17, 2021	April 1, 2023	Liberal		Black Canadian
Brian Wong (born 1963)	Waverley-Fall River-Beaver Bank	August 17, 2021	Incumbent	Conservative		Chinese Canadian
Twila Grosse	Preston	August 8, 2023	Incumbent	Conservative		Black Canadian
Adegoke Fadare	Clayton Park West	November 26, 2024	Incumbent	Conservative		Black Canadian (Nigerian)
Lina Hamid	Fairview-Clayton Park	November 26, 2024	Incumbent	NDP		Black Canadian (Sudanese)

=== Nunavut ===
Member of Legislative Assembly	Riding	Took office	Left office	Party	Ref.	Note
Kelvin Ng (born 1958)	Cambridge Bay	April 1, 1999	February 15, 2004	Independent		Chinese-Canadian (Cantonese) First Chinese Canadian elected to Nunavut Legislature; NWT MLA (1995–1999)

=== Ontario ===
Member of Provincial Parliament	Riding	Took office	Left office	Party	Ref.	Note
Leonard Braithwaite (1923–2012)	Etobicoke	September 25, 1963	September 17, 1975	Liberal		Black Canadian (Barbadian) First Black Canadian elected to Ontario legislature
Alvin Curling (born 1939)	Scarborough—Rouge River	May 2, 1985	August 19, 2005	Liberal		Black Canadian (Jamaican)
Murad Velshi 𑈤𑈯𑈦𑈬𑈛 𑈨𑈰𑈧𑈵𑈩𑈶𑈮 (born 1935)	Don Mills	September 10, 1987	September 5, 1990	Liberal		Indian-Canadian (Khoja) First Indo-Canadian elected to Ontario Legislature; First Afro-Indian Canadian elected to Ontario Legislature; First Muslim elected to Ontario Legislature
Bob Wong 黃景培 (born 1941)	Fort York	September 10, 1987	September 5, 1990	Liberal		Chinese-Canadian (Cantonese) First Chinese Canadian elected to Ontario legislature
Zanana Akande (born 1937)	St. Andrew—St. Patrick	September 6, 1990	August 31, 1994	NDP		Black Canadian (St. Lucian)
David Boushy (born 1932)	Sarnia	June 8, 1995	June 2, 1999	Conservative		Lebanese-Canadian First Lebanese Canadian elected to Ontario Legislature
Tony Clement (born 1961)	Brampton West—Mississauga	June 8, 1995	October 1, 2003	Conservative		Syrian-Canadian; Cypriot-Canadian First Syrian Canadian elected to Ontario Legislature; Federal MP (2006–2019)
David Tsubouchi (born 1951)	Markham	June 8, 1995	October 1, 2003	Conservative		Japanese-Canadian First Japanese Canadian elected to Ontario Legislature
Raminder Gill (born 1950)	Bramalea—Gore—Malton—Springdale	June 3, 1999	October 1, 2003	Conservative		Indian-Canadian (Punjabi) First Sikh elected to Ontario Legislature
Mary Anne Chambers (born 1950)	Scarborough East	October 2, 2003	October 9, 2007	Liberal		Black Canadian (Jamaican)
Vic Dhillon (born 1969)	Brampton West	October 2, 2003	June 6, 2018	Liberal		Indian-Canadian (Punjabi)
Kuldip Kular (born 1948)	Bramalea—Gore—Malton	October 2, 2003	October 5, 2011	Liberal		Indian-Canadian (Punjabi)
Muhammad Shafiq Qaadri محمد شفیق قادری (born 1963)	Etobicoke North	October 2, 2003	June 6, 2018	Liberal		Pakistani-Canadian First Pakistani Canadian elected to Ontario Legislature
Khalil Ramal (born 1960)	London—Fanshawe	October 2, 2003	October 5, 2011	Liberal		Lebanese-Canadian
Harinder Takhar (born 1951)	Mississauga—Erindale	October 2, 2003	June 6, 2018	Liberal		Indian-Canadian (Punjabi)
Tony Wong 黃志華 (1948–2009)	Markham	October 2, 2003	September 25, 2006	Liberal		Chinese-Canadian (Cantonese)
Bas Balkissoon (born 1952)	Scarborough—Rouge River	November 24, 2005	March 22, 2016	Liberal		Indian Canadian (Trinidadian)
Michael Chan 陳國治 (born 1951)	Markham-Unionville	February 8, 2007	June 6, 2018	Liberal		Chinese-Canadian (Mainland)
Margarett Best (born 1958)	Scarborough-Guildwood	October 10, 2007	June 27, 2013	Liberal		Black Canadian (Jamaican)
Amrit Mangat (born 1953)	Mississauga—Brampton South	October 10, 2007	June 6, 2018	Liberal		Indian-Canadian (Punjabi)
Reza Moridi رضا مریدی (born 1945)	Richmond Hill	October 10, 2007	June 6, 2018	Liberal		Iranian-Canadian First Iranian Canadian elected to Ontario Legislature
Yasir Abbas Naqvi یاسر عباس نقوی (born 1973)	Ottawa Centre	October 10, 2007	June 6, 2018	Liberal		Pakistani-Canadian
Michael Coteau (born 1972)	Don Valley East	October 6, 2011	August 17, 2021	Liberal		Black Canadian (Grenadian) First Grenadian Canadian elected to Ontario Legislature
Dipika Damerla	Mississauga East—Cooksville	October 6, 2011	June 6, 2018	Liberal		Indian-Canadian (Telugu)
Jagmeet Singh ਜਗਮੀਤ ਸਿੰਘ (born 1979)	Bramalea—Gore—Malton	October 6, 2011	October 2, 2017	NDP		Indian-Canadian (Punjabi)
Soo Wong (born 1962)	Scarborough—Agincourt	October 6, 2011	June 6, 2018	Liberal		Chinese-Canadian (Cantonese)
Mitzie Hunter (born 1971)	Scarborough-Guildwood	August 1, 2013	May 10, 2023	Liberal		Black Canadian (Jamaican)
Granville Anderson (born 1960)	Durham	June 12, 2014	June 6, 2018	Liberal		Black Canadian (Jamaican)
Han Dong 董晗鵬 (born 1977)	Trinity—Spadina	June 12, 2014	June 6, 2018	Liberal		Chinese-Canadian (Mainland)
Harinder Malhi (born 1980)	Brampton—Springdale	June 12, 2014	June 6, 2018	Liberal		Indian-Canadian (Punjabi)
Indira Naidoo-Harris	Halton	June 12, 2014	June 6, 2018	Liberal		Indian-Canadian (Tamil)
Raymond Cho 조성준 (born 1936)	Scarborough—Rouge River	September 1, 2016	Incumbent	Conservative		Korean-Canadian First Korean Canadian elected to the Ontario Legislature
Deepak Anand (born 1972)	Mississauga—Malton	June 7, 2018	Incumbent	Conservative		Indian-Canadian (Punjabi)
Jill Andrew	Toronto—St. Paul's	June 7, 2018	February 26, 2025	NDP		Black Canadian
Aris Babikian	Scarborough—Agincourt	June 7, 2018	Incumbent	Conservative		Armenian-Canadian First Armenian Canadian elected to Ontario Legislature
Doly Begum ডলি বেগম (born 1989)	Scarborough Southwest	June 7, 2018	February 3, 2026	NDP		Bangladeshi-Canadian First Bangladeshi Canadian elected to Ontario Legislature
Rima Berns-McGown	Beaches—East York	June 7, 2018	June 1, 2022	NDP		Black Canadian (South African)
Stan Cho 조성훈 (born 1977)	Willowdale	June 7, 2018	Incumbent	Conservative		Korean-Canadian
Golsa Goldie Ghamari گلسا گولدی قمری (born 1985)	Carleton	June 7, 2018	February 26, 2025	Conservative		Iranian-Canadian
Parm Gill (born 1974)	Milton	June 7, 2018	February 16, 2024	Conservative		Indian-Canadian (Punjabi); Federal MP (2011–2015)
Faisal Hassan	York South—Weston	June 7, 2018	June 1, 2022	NDP		Somali-Canadian First Somali Canadian elected to Ontario Legislature
Logan Kanapathi	Markham—Thornhill	June 7, 2018	Incumbent	Conservative		Sri Lankan-Canadian (Tamil) First Tamil Canadian elected to Ontario Legislature (of 2)
Belinda Karahalios (born 1982)	Cambridge	June 7, 2018	June 1, 2022	Conservative		Black Canadian (Trinidadian)
Bhutila Karpoche (born 1984)	Parkdale—High Park	June 7, 2018	February 26, 2025	NDP		Nepali-Canadian (Tibetan) First Tibetan Canadian elected to Ontario Legislature
Vincent Ke 柯文彬	Don Valley North	June 7, 2018	February 26, 2025	Conservative		Chinese-Canadian (Mainland)
Laura Mae Lindo (born 1976)	Kitchener Centre	June 7, 2018	July 13, 2023	NDP		Black Canadian (Jamaican)
Billy Pang	Markham—Unionville	June 7, 2018	Incumbent	Conservative		Chinese-Canadian (Cantonese)
Michael Parsa میکائیل پارسا	Aurora—Oak Ridges—Richmond Hill	June 7, 2018	Incumbent	Conservative		Iranian-Canadian
Kaleed Rasheed خلید رشید خان (born 1982)	Mississauga East—Cooksville	June 7, 2018	February 26, 2025	Conservative		Pakistani-Canadian
Sheref Sabawy (born 1965)	Mississauga—Erin Mills	June 7, 2018	Incumbent	Conservative		Egyptian-Canadian First Egyptian Canadian elected to Ontario Legislature
Amarjot Sandhu ਅਮਰਜੋਤ ਸੰਧੂ (born 1977)	Brampton West	June 7, 2018	Incumbent	Conservative		Indian-Canadian (Punjabi)
Prabmeet Sarkaria (born 1988)	Brampton South	June 7, 2018	Incumbent	Conservative		Indian-Canadian (Punjabi)
Gurratan Singh (born 1984)	Brampton East	June 7, 2018	June 1, 2022	NDP		Indian-Canadian (Punjabi)
Sara Singh (born 1985)	Brampton Centre	June 7, 2018	June 1, 2022	NDP		Indian-Canadian (Punjabi)
Nina Tangri (born 1965)	Mississauga—Streetsville	June 7, 2018	Incumbent	Conservative		Indian-Canadian (Punjabi)
Vijay Thanigasalam (born 1989)	Scarborough—Rouge Park	June 7, 2018	Incumbent	Conservative		Sri Lankan-Canadian (Tamil) First Tamil Canadian elected to Ontario Legislature (of 2)
Daisy Wai	Richmond Hill	June 7, 2018	Incumbent	Conservative		Chinese-Canadian (Mainland)
Patrice Barnes	Ajax	June 2, 2022	February 26, 2025	Conservative		Black Canadian (Jamaican)
Kevin Yarde	Brampton North	June 7, 2018	June 1, 2022	NDP		Black Canadian (Barbadian)
Hardeep Grewal	Brampton East	June 2, 2022	Incumbent	Conservative		Indo Canadian (Punjabi)
Ted Hsu 徐正陶 (born 1964)	Kingston and the Islands	June 2, 2022	Incumbent	Liberal		Chinese-Canadian
Adil Shamji	Don Valley East	June 2, 2022	Incumbent	Liberal		Indo Canadian (Gujarati)
David Smith	Scarborough Centre	June 2, 2022	Incumbent	Conservative		Black Canadian (Jamaican)
Charmaine Williams	Brampton Centre	June 2, 2022	Incumbent	Conservative		Black Canadian (Jamaican)
Kristyn Wong-Tam (born 1971)	Toronto Centre	June 2, 2022	Incumbent	NDP		Chinese Canadian (Cantonese)
Sarah Jama	Hamilton Centre	March 16, 2023	February 26, 2025	Independent		Black Canadian (Somali)
Andrea Hazell	Scarborough-Guildwood	July 27, 2023	Incumbent	Liberal		Black Canadian (Jamaican)
Zee Hamid	Milton	May 2, 2024	Incumbent	Conservative		Pakistani Canadian
George Darouze (born 1964)	Carleton	February 27, 2025	Incumbent	Conservative		Lebanese Canadian
Mohamed Firin	York South—Weston	February 27, 2025	Incumbent	Conservative		Somali Canadian
Jonathan Tsao (born 1987)	Don Valley North	February 27, 2025	Incumbent	Liberal		Chinese Canadian

=== Prince Edward Island ===
Member of Legislative Assembly	Riding	Took office	Left office	Party	Ref.	Note
Joe Ghiz (1945–1996)	6th Queens	September 27, 1982	March 26, 1993	Liberal		Lebanese-Canadian First Visible Minority elected to PEI Legislature; First Lebanese Canadian elected to PEI Legislature; First Visible Minority elected Premier of a Province; Premier of Prince Edward Island (1986–1993); Leader of the PEI Liberal Party (1981–1993)
Robert Ghiz (born 1974)	Charlottetown-Brighton	September 29, 2003	February 24, 2015	Liberal		Lebanese-Canadian Premier of Prince Edward Island (2007–2015); Leader of the PEI Liberal Party (2003–2015)
Gord McNeilly	Charlottetown-West Royalty	April 23, 2019	Incumbent	Liberal		Black-Canadian (Trinidadian) First Trinidadian Canadian elected to PEI Legislature

=== Quebec ===
Member of National Assembly	Riding	Took office	Left office	Party	Ref.	Note
Mark Assad (born 1940)	Papineau	April 29, 1970	November 14, 1976	Liberal		Lebanese-Canadian First Visible Minority elected to Quebec Legislature; First Liberal Visible Minority elected to Quebec Legislature; Federal MP (1988–2004)
Mark Assad (born 1940)	Papineau	April 13, 1981	November 20, 1988	Liberal		Lebanese-Canadian First Visible Minority elected to Quebec Legislature; First Liberal Visible Minority elected to Quebec Legislature; Federal MP (1988–2004)
Jean Alfred (1940–2015)	Papineau	November 15, 1976	April 12, 1981	Parti Quebecois		Black Canadian (Haitian) First Haitian Canadian elected to Quebec Legislature; First PQ Visible Minority elected to Quebec Legislature
Albert Khelfa (born 1945)	Richelieu	December 2, 1985	September 11, 1994	Liberal		Egyptian-Canadian First Egyptian Canadian elected to the Quebec Legislature
Sam Elkas (born 1938)	Robert-Baldwin	September 25, 1989	September 11, 1994	Liberal		Turkish-Canadian First Turkish Canadian elected to the Quebec Legislature
Joseph Facal (born 1961)	Fabre	September 12, 1994	April 13, 2003	Parti Quebecois		Uruguayan-Canadian First Uruguayan Canadian elected to Quebec Legislature
Fatima Houda-Pepin (born 1951)	La Pinière	September 12, 1994	April 7, 2014	Independent		Moroccan-Canadian First Moroccan Canadian elected to Quebec Legislature; First Muslim elected to Quebec Legislature; Liberal MNA (1994–2014)
Sam Hamad (born 1958)	Louis-Hébert	April 14, 2003	April 27, 2017	Liberal		Syrian-Canadian First Syrian Canadian elected to Quebec Legislature
Yolande James (born 1977)	Nelligan	September 20, 2004	April 6, 2014	Liberal		Black Canadian (St. Lucian) First St. Lucian Canadian elected to Quebec Legislature
Emmanuel Dubourg (born 1958)	Viau	March 26, 2007	August 9, 2013	Liberal		Black Canadian (Haitian) Federal MP (2013–present)
Maka Kotto (born 1961)	Bourget	May 12, 2008	September 30, 2018	Parti Quebecois		Black Canadian (Cameroonian) First Cameroonian Canadian elected to Quebec Legislature
Amir Khadir امیر خدیر (born 1961)	Mercier	December 8, 2008	September 30, 2018	Québec Solidaire		Iranian-Canadian First Iranian Canadian elected to Quebec Legislature; Leader of the Quebec Solidaire (2006–2012)
Saul Polo	Laval-des-Rapides	April 7, 2014	August 28, 2022	Liberal		Colombian-Canadian First Colombian Canadian elected to Quebec Legislature
Dominique Anglade (born 1974)	Saint-Henri–Sainte-Anne	November 9, 2015	December 1, 2022	Liberal		Black Canadian (Haitian) Leader of the Liberal Party of Québec (2020–2022)
Frantz Benjamin	Viau	October 1, 2018	Incumbent	Liberal		Black Canadian (Haitian)
Lionel Carmant	Taillon	October 1, 2018	Incumbent	CAQ		Black-Canadian (Haitian)
Monsef Derraji (born 1976)	Nelligan	October 1, 2018	Incumbent	Liberal		Moroccan-Canadian
Andrés Fontecilla (born 1967)	Laurier-Dorion	October 1, 2018	Incumbent	Québec Solidaire		Chilean-Canadian
Ruba Ghazal (born 1977)	Mercier	October 1, 2018	Incumbent	Québec Solidaire		Palestinian-Canadian
Nadine Girault (1951–2023)	Bertrand	October 1, 2018	August 28, 2022	CAQ		Black-Canadian (Haitian)
Samuel Poulin	Beauce-Sud	October 1, 2018	Incumbent	CAQ		Moroccan-Canadian
Marwah Rizqy (born 1985)	Saint-Laurent	October 1, 2018	Incumbent	Liberal		Moroccan-Canadian
Christopher Skeete (born 1979)	Sainte-Rose	October 1, 2018	Incumbent	CAQ		Black-Canadian (Trinidadian) First Trinidadian Canadian elected to Quebec Legislature
Shirley Dorismond	Marie-Victorin	April 11, 2022	Incumbent	CAQ		Black-Canadian (Haitian)
Haroun Bouazzi (born 1979)	Maurice-Richard	October 3, 2022	Incumbent	Québec Solidaire		Tunisian-Canadian First Tunisian-Canadian elected to Quebec Legislature
Alejandra Zaga Mendez (born 1988)	Verdun	October 3, 2022	Incumbent	Québec Solidaire		Peruvian-Canadian First Peruvian-Canadian elected to Quebec Legislature
Michelle Setlakwe	Mont-Royal–Outremont	October 3, 2022	Incumbent	Liberal		Armenian-Canadian Joint first Armenian-Canadian elected to Quebec Legislature
Madwa-Nika Cadet	Bourassa-Sauvé	October 3, 2022	Incumbent	Liberal		Black-Canadian (Haitian)
Sona Lakhoyan Olivier	Chomedey	October 3, 2022	Incumbent	Liberal		Armenian-Canadian Joint first Armenian-Canadian elected to Quebec Legislature
Alice Abou-Khalil	Fabre	October 3, 2022	Incumbent	CAQ		Lebanese-Canadian
Céline Haytayan	Laval-des-Rapides	October 3, 2022	Incumbent	CAQ		Armenian-Canadian Joint first Armenian-Canadian elected to Quebec Legislature

=== Saskatchewan ===
Member of Legislative Assembly	Riding	Took office	Left office	Party	Ref.	Note
Muhammad Fiaz محمد فیاض	Regina Pasqua	April 4, 2016	October 27, 2024	Saskatchewan		Pakistani-Canadian First Visible Minority elected to Saskatchewan Legislature; First Muslim elected to Saskatchewan Legislature; First Pakistani Canadian elected to the Saskatchewan Legislature
Gary Grewal	Regina Northeast	October 26, 2020	October 27, 2024	Saskatchewan		Indo Canadian (Punjabi) First Sikh elected to Saskatchewan Legislature; First Indo Canadian elected to the Saskatchewan Legislature
Noor Burki نور برکی	Regina Coronation Park	August 10, 2023	Incumbent	NDP		Pakistani Canadian (Ormur)
Bhajan Brar	Regina Pasqua	October 28, 2024	Incumbent	NDP		Indian Canadian (Punjabi)
David Chan	Yorkton	October 28, 2024	Incumbent	Saskatchewan		Chinese Canadian (Cantonese) First Chinese Canadian elected to the Saskatchewan Legislature
Tajinder Grewal	Saskatoon University-Sutherland	October 28, 2024	Incumbent	NDP		Indian Canadian (Punjabi)

=== Yukon ===
Member of Legislative Assembly	Riding	Took office	Left office	Party	Ref.	Note
Ranj Pillai (born 1974)	Porter Creek South	November 7, 2016	Incumbent	Liberal		Indian Canadian (Malayali) First Visible Minority elected to Yukon Legislature; First Indo Canadian elected to the Yukon Legislature; First Visible Minority Premier of Yukon
Yvonne Clarke	Porter Creek Centre	April 12, 2021	Incumbent	Yukon		Filipino Canadian First Filipino Canadian elected to Yukon Legislature

== Visible minorities by assembly composition ==
=== House of Commons ===
Parliament	Years	VM total	Bloc	Conservative	Liberal	NDP	Others	Independent
23rd	1957–1958	1	-	1 / 115	0 / 105	0 / 25	-	0 / 4
24th	1958–1962	1	-	1 / 216	0 / 53	0 / 9	-	0 / 6
25th	1962–1963	0	-	0 / 116	0 / 99	0 / 18	-	0 / 1
26th	1963–1965	0	-	0 / 95	0 / 128	0 / 17	-	0 / 1
27th	1965–1968	0	-	0 / 97	0 / 131	0 / 21	-	0 / 2
28th	1968–1972	2	-	1 / 74	1 / 158	0 / 27	-	0 / 2
29th	1972–1974	2	-	1 / 107	1 / 109	0 / 31	-	0 / 2
30th	1974–1979	4	-	1 / 108	2 / 149	1 / 18	-	0 / 1
31st	1979–1980	4	-	2 / 136	1 / 115	1 / 27	-	-
32nd	1980–1984	2	-	1 / 109	1 / 151	0 / 34	-	-
33rd	1984–1988	2	-	1 / 213	0 / 41	1 / 33	-	0 / 1
34th	1988–1993	6	0 / 10	2 / 169	3 / 85	1 / 45	0 / 1	0 / 1
35th	1993–1997	14	1 / 55	0 / 2	12 / 185	0 / 9	1 / 52	0 / 1
36th	1997–2000	18	0 / 45	0 / 22	12 / 160	1 / 22	5 / 61	0 / 1
37th	2000–2004	17	0 / 40	0 / 14	11 / 178	0 / 14	6 / 67	-
38th	2004–2006	23	2 / 54	8 / 99	13 / 136	0 / 19	-	0 / 1
39th	2006–2008	29	5 / 53	9 / 126	13 / 107	1 / 30	-	1 / 1
40th	2008–2011	25	3 / 50	10 / 147	10 / 78	1 / 38	-	1 / 2
41st	2011–2015	33	1 / 4	14 / 166	4 / 34	14 / 103	-	-
42nd	2015–2019	49	0 / 10	8 / 105	39 / 184	2 / 44	0 / 1	–
43rd	2019–2021	50	0 / 32	11 / 121	36 / 157	3 / 24	0 / 3	0 / 1
44th	2021–present	53	0 / 32	8 / 119	43 / 159	3 / 25	0 / 2	1 / 1
45th	2025–present	61	0 / 23	19 / 144	41 / 168	1 / 7	0 / 1	–

=== Alberta Legislative Assembly ===
Parliament	Years	VM total	Conservative	Liberal	NDP	Other	Independent
17th	1971–1975	1	0 / 51	-	0 / 1	1 / 25	-
18th	1975–1979	1	1 / 69	-	0 / 1	0 / 4	0 / 1
19th	1979–1982	2	2 / 75	-	0 / 1	0 / 4	-
20th	1982–1986	2	2 / 75	-	0 / 2	-	-
21st	1986–1989	1	1 / 62	0 / 4	0 / 16	-	-
22nd	1989–1993	0	0 / 61	0 / 10	0 / 17	-	-
23rd	1993–1997	6	5 / 52	1 / 33	-	-	-
24th	1997–2001	6	5 / 64	0 / 19	1 / 3	-	-
25th	2001–2004	6	5 / 75	0 / 7	1 / 2	-	-
26th	2004–2008	9	6 / 63	2 / 17	1 / 4	0 / 1	-
27th	2008–2012	13	11 / 69	2 / 10	0 / 2	0 / 4	-
28th	2012–2015	13	11 / 65	2 / 5	0 / 4	0 / 17	-
29th	2015–2019	12	5 / 31	0 / 1	7 / 54	0 / 3	0 / 3
30th	2019–2023	17	11 / 62	-	6 / 25	-	-
31st	2023–present	19	5 / 48	-	14 / 38	-	-

=== British Columbia Legislative Assembly ===
Parliament	Years	VM total	Conservative (Note: Includes results for BC Liberals/BC United)	New Democratic	Other	Independent
30th	1972–1975	2	0 / 6	2 / 38	0 / 13	-
31st	1975–1979	2	0 / 1	2 / 19	0 / 37	-
32nd	1979–1983	2	-	2 / 26	0 / 32	-
33rd	1983–1986	2	-	2 / 24	0 / 35	-
34th	1986–1991	2	-	2 / 28	0 / 47	-
35th	1991–1996	5	0 / 20	4 / 51	1 / 9	-
36th	1996–2001	6	2 / 36	4 / 39	0 / 3	-
37th	2001–2005	13	11 / 77	2 / 3	-	-
38th	2005–2009	12	7 / 46	5 / 35	-	-
39th	2009–2013	12	6 / 50	6 / 37	0 / 1	0 / 1
40th	2013–2017	11	6 / 50	5 / 36	0 / 1	0 / 1
41st	2017–2020	15	4 / 42	11 / 41	0 / 3	0 / 1
42nd	2020–2024	18	2 / 28	16 / 58	0 / 2	-
43rd	2024–present	25	8 / 44	17 / 47	0 / 2	-

=== Manitoba Legislative Assembly ===
Parliament	Years	VM total	Conservative	Liberal	NDP	Independent
32nd	1981–1986	1	0 / 24	-	1 / 35	-
33rd	1986–1988	1	0 / 26	0 / 1	1 / 30	-
34th	1988–1990	1	0 / 25	1 / 20	0 / 12	-
35th	1990–1995	2	0 / 31	1 / 10	1 / 23	-
36th	1995–1999	2	1 / 33	0 / 3	1 / 23	-
37th	1999–2003	2	0 / 27	0 / 1	2 / 32	-
38th	2003–2007	3	0 / 22	0 / 2	3 / 36	-
39th	2007–2011	3	0 / 19	0 / 2	3 / 39	-
40th	2011–2016	4	0 / 22	0 / 1	4 / 38	-
41st	2016–2019	4	1 / 39	0 / 3	2 / 13	1 / 2
42nd	2019–2023	8	3 / 36	0 / 3	5 / 18	-
43rd	2023–present	10	1 / 22	0 / 1	9 / 34	-

=== New Brunswick Legislative Assembly ===
Parliament	Years	VM total	Conservative	Liberal	Green
61st	2024-present	1	0 / 16	1 / 31	0 / 2

=== Newfoundland and Labrador House of Assembly ===
Parliament	Years	VM total	Conservative	Liberal	NDP	Independent
45th	2003–2007	1	0 / 40	0 / 13	1 / 3	-
46th	2007–2011	1	0 / 50	0 / 4	1 / 1	-
47th	2011–2015	1	0 / 37	0 / 13	1 / 5	-
48th	2015–2019	1	0 / 8	0 / 31	1 / 2	-
48th	2019–2021	0	0 / 15	0 / 20	0 / 3	0 / 2
49th	2021–present	0	0 / 13	0 / 22	0 / 3	-

=== Northwest Territories Legislative Assembly ===
Parliament	Years	VM total	Independent
10th	1964–1967	1	1 / 9
11th	1967–1970	0	0 / 12
12th	1970–1975	0	0 / 14
13th	1975–1979	0	0 / 15
14th	1979–1983	0	0 / 22
15th	1983–1987	0	0 / 23
16th	1987–1991	0	0 / 24
17th	1991–1995	0	0 / 24
18th	1995–1999	1	1 / 24
19th	1999–2003	1	1 / 19
20th	2003–2007	1	1 / 19
21st	2007–2011	1	1 / 19
22nd	2011–2015	0	0 / 19
23rd	2015–2019	0	0 / 19
24th	2019–2023	0	0 / 19
25th	2023–present	0	0 / 19

=== Nova Scotia Legislative Assembly ===
Parliament	Years	VM total	Conservative	Liberal	NDP	Independent
56th	1993–1998	1	0 / 12	1 / 43	0 / 5	-
57th	1998–1999	1	0 / 14	0 / 19	1 / 19	-
58th	1999–2003	0	0 / 31	0 / 12	0 / 12	-
59th	2003–2006	0	0 / 26	0 / 12	0 / 15	-
60th	2006–2009	2	0 / 23	0 / 9	2 / 21	-
61st	2009–2013	3	0 / 13	1 / 13	2 / 32	-
62nd	2013–2017	5	0 / 11	5 / 35	0 / 9	-
63rd	2017–2021	5	0 / 17	5 / 27	0 / 7	-
64th	2021–2024	9	2 / 32	6 / 17	1 / 6	-
64th	2024–present	5	3 / 42	0 / 3	2 / 9	-

=== Ontario Legislative Assembly ===
Parliament	Years	VM total	Conservative	Liberal	NDP	Other	Independent
27th	1963–1967	1	0 / 77	1 / 24	0 / 7	-	-
28th	1967–1971	1	0 / 69	1 / 28	0 / 20	-	-
29th	1971–1975	1	0 / 78	1 / 20	0 / 19	-	-
30th	1975–1977	0	0 / 51	0 / 35	0 / 38	-	-
31st	1977–1981	0	0 / 58	0 / 34	0 / 33	-	-
32nd	1981–1985	0	0 / 70	0 / 34	0 / 21	-	-
33rd	1985–1987	1	0 / 52	1 / 50	0 / 25	-	-
34th	1987–1990	3	0 / 17	3 / 95	0 / 20	-	-
35th	1990–1995	2	0 / 22	1 / 39	1 / 74	-	-
36th	1995–1999	4	3 / 82	1 / 33	0 / 19	-	-
37th	1999–2003	4	3 / 62	1 / 37	0 / 10	-	-
38th	2003–2007	10	0 / 28	10 / 74	0 / 11	-	-
39th	2007–2011	11	0 / 27	11 / 75	0 / 10	-	-
40th	2011–2014	14	0 / 39	13 / 56	1 / 21	-	-
41st	2014–2018	18	1 / 32	16 / 60	1 / 21	0 / 1	-
42nd	2018–2022	29	18 / 76	2 / 7	9 / 40	0 / 1	-
43rd	2022–2025	29	21 / 83	3 / 8	5 / 31	0 / 1	0 / 1
44th	2025–present	25	19 / 80	4 / 14	2 / 27	0 / 2	0 / 1

=== Prince Edward Island Legislative Assembly ===
Parliament	Years	VM total	Conservative	Liberal	Green	Other
62nd	2003–2007	1	0 / 23	1 / 4	-	-
63rd	2007–2011	1	0 / 4	1 / 23	-	-
64th	2011–2015	1	0 / 5	1 / 22	-	-
65th	2015–2019	0	0 / 8	0 / 18	0 / 1	-
66th	2019–2023	1	0 / 13	1 / 6	0 / 8	-
67th	2023–present	1	0 / 21	1 / 3	0 / 3	-

=== Quebec National Assembly ===
Parliament	Years	VM total	UN/ADQ/CAQ	Liberal	QS	PQ	Others
29th	1970–1973	1	0 / 17	1 / 72	-	0 / 7	0 / 12
30th	1973–1976	1	–	1 / 102	-	0 / 6	0 / 2
31st	1976–1981	1	0 / 11	0 / 26	-	1 / 71	-
32nd	1981–1985	1	-	1 / 42	-	0 / 80	-
33rd	1985–1989	2	-	2 / 99	-	0 / 23	-
34th	1989–1994	2	-	2 / 92	-	0 / 29	0 / 4
35th	1994–1998	2	0 / 1	1 / 47	-	1 / 77	-
36th	1998–2003	2	0 / 5	1 / 48	-	1 / 76	-
37th	2003–2007	2	0 / 4	2 / 76	-	0 / 51	-
38th	2007–2008	5	0 / 41	4 / 48	-	1 / 36	-
39th	2008–2012	6	0 / 7	4 / 66	1 / 1	1 / 55	-
40th	2012–2014	6	0 / 19	4 / 50	1 / 2	1 / 54	-
41st	2014–2018	5	0 / 22	3 / 70	1 / 3	1 / 30	-
42nd	2018–2022	11	4 / 74	5 / 32	2 / 10	0 / 9	-
43rd	2022–present	17	6 / 90	7 / 21	4 / 11	0 / 3	

=== Saskatchewan Legislative Assembly ===
Parliament	Years	VM total	NDP	Saskatchewan (Conservative)	Independent
28th	2016–2020	1	0 / 12	1 / 51	-
29th	2020–2024	3	1 / 15	2 / 49	-
30th	2024–present	4	3 / 27	1 / 34	-

=== Yukon Legislative Assembly ===
Parliament	Years	VM total	Yukon (Conservative)	Liberal	NDP	Independent
38th	2016–2021	1	0 / 6	1 / 11	0 / 2	-
39th	2021–present	2	1 / 8	1 / 9	0 / 2	-

== Visible minorities ever elected to Canadian legislatures by ethnic composition ==
Ethnic Origin		HoC	Sen	AB	BC	MB	NB	NL	NT	NS	NU	ON	PE	QC	SK	YK	Total
(Afghanistan)	Afghan-Canadian	1	0	0	0	0	0	0	0	0	0	0	0	0	0	0	1
(Algeria)	Algerian-Canadian	3	0	0	0	0	0	0	0	0	0	0	0	0	0	0	3
(Argentina)	Argentinean-Canadian	1	0	0	0	0	0	0	0	0	0	0	0	0	0	0	1
(Armenia)	Armenian-Canadian	2	1	0	0	0	0	0	0	0	0	1	0	3	0	0	7
(Bangladesh)	Bangladeshi-Canadian	0	0	0	0	0	0	0	0	0	0	2	0	0	0	0	2
(Barbados)	Barbadian-Canadian	0	1	1	0	0	0	0	0	0	0	2	0	0	0	0	4
(Canada)	Black Canadian	2	3	2	0	1	0	0	0	8	0	1	0	0	0	0	17
(Cameroon)	Cameroonian-Canadian	1	1	0	0	0	0	0	0	0	0	0	0	1	0	0	3
(Chile)	Chilean-Canadian	3	0	1	0	0	0	0	0	0	0	0	0	1	0	0	5
(China)	Chinese-Canadian	23	2	8	12	1	0	0	1	1	1	10	0	0	1	0	58
(Colombia)	Colombian-Canadian	0	0	1	0	0	0	0	0	0	0	0	0	1	0	0	2
(Dominican Republic)	Dominican-Canadian	1	0	0	0	0	0	0	0	0	0	0	0	0	0	0	1
(Egypt)	Egyptian-Canadian	1	0	2	0	0	0	0	0	0	0	1	0	1	0	0	5
(Fiji)	Fijian-Canadian	0	0	1	0	0	0	0	0	0	0	0	0	0	0	0	1
(Philippines)	Filipino-Canadian	2	2	2	1	7	0	0	0	0	0	0	0	0	0	1	15
(Grenada)	Grenadian-Canadian	3	0	0	0	0	0	0	0	0	0	1	0	0	0	0	4
(Guyana)	Guyanese-Canadian	1	1	0	0	0	0	0	0	0	0	0	0	0	0	0	2
(Haiti)	Haitian-Canadian	2	1	0	0	0	0	0	0	0	0	0	0	8	0	0	11
(India)	Indian-Canadian	47	8	19	25	6	1	0	0	1	0	18	0	0	2	1	128
(Iraq)	Iraqi-Canadian	0	0	0	0	0	0	0	0	1	0	0	0	0	0	0	1
(Iran)	Iranian-Canadian	3	0	0	0	0	0	0	0	0	0	3	0	1	0	0	7
(Jamaica)	Jamaican-Canadian	5	3	1	1	1	0	0	0	0	0	11	0	0	0	0	22
(Japan)	Japanese-Canadian	1	0	2	1	0	0	0	0	0	0	1	0	0	0	0	5
(Kenya)	Kenyan-Canadian	1	0	0	1	0	0	0	0	0	0	0	0	0	0	0	1
(South Korea)	Korean-Canadian	1	1	0	1	0	0	0	1	0	0	2	0	0	0	0	6
(Lebanon)	Lebanese-Canadian	13	3	4	0	1	0	1	1	3	0	2	2	3	0	0	33
(Montserrat)	Montserratian-Canadian	1	0	0	0	0	0	0	0	0	0	0	0	0	0	0	1
(Morocco)	Moroccan-Canadian	0	0	0	0	0	0	0	0	0	0	0	0	4	0	0	4
(Nepal)	Nepali-Canadian	0	0	0	0	0	0	0	0	0	0	1	0	0	0	0	1
(Nicaragua)	Nicaraguan-Canadian	0	0	1	0	0	0	0	0	0	0	0	0	0	0	0	1
(Pakistan)	Pakistani-Canadian	7	1	5	0	1	0	0	0	0	0	3	0	0	1	0	18
(Peru)	Peruvian-Canadian	0	1	0	0	0	0	0	0	0	0	0	0	1	0	0	2
(El Salvador)	Salvadoran-Canadian	0	0	1	0	0	0	0	0	0	0	0	0	0	0	0	1
(Saint Lucia)	St. Lucian-Canadian	0	0	0	0	0	0	0	0	0	0	1	0	1	0	0	2
(Singapore)	Singaporean-Canadian	0	2	0	1	0	0	0	0	0	0	0	0	0	0	0	3
(Somalia)	Somalian-Canadian	1	0	1	0	0	0	0	0	1	0	1	0	0	0	0	4
(South Africa)	South African-Canadian	0	0	0	0	0	0	0	0	0	0	1	0	0	0	0	1
(Sri Lanka)	Sri Lankan-Canadian	2	0	0	0	0	0	0	0	0	0	2	0	0	0	0	4
(Syria)	Syrian-Canadian	3	0	0	0	0	0	0	0	0	0	1	0	1	0	0	5
(Tanzania)	Tanzanian-Canadian	0	0	1	0	0	0	0	0	0	0	0	0	0	0	0	1
(Trinidad and Tobago)	Trindadian-Canadian	2	1	1	0	0	0	0	0	0	0	2	0	1	0	0	7
(Tunisia)	Tunisian-Canadian	2	0	0	0	0	0	0	0	0	0	0	0	1	0	0	3
(Turkey)	Turkish-Canadian	0	0	0	0	0	0	0	0	0	0	0	0	1	0	0	1
(Uganda)	Ugandan-Canadian	0	1	0	0	0	0	0	0	0	0	0	0	0	0	0	1
(Uruguay)	Uruguayan-Canadian	0	0	0	0	0	0	0	0	0	0	0	0	1	0	0	1
(Vietnam)	Vietnamese-Canadian	4	1	3	0	0	0	0	0	0	0	0	0	0	0	0	8
(Yemen)	Yemeni-Canadian	0	0	1	0	0	0	0	0	0	0	0	0	0	0	0	1

== Municipal (major cities: population over 500,000) ==
=== Brampton ===
Portrait	City councillor	Ward	Took office	Left office	Party	Ref.	Note
	Vicky Dhillon	Ward 9 + 10; City	November 13, 2006	October 26, 2014	Independent		Indian Canadian (Punjabi)
	Gurpreet Dhillon	Ward 9 + 10; City (2014–2018); Regional (2018–present)	October 27, 2014	October 24, 2022	Independent		Indian Canadian (Punjabi)
	Rowena Santos	Ward 1 + 5 City	October 22, 2018	Incumbent	Independent		Filipino Canadian
	Harkirat Singh	Ward 9 + 10; City	October 22, 2018	Incumbent	Independent		Indian Canadian (Punjabi)
	Charmaine Williams	Ward 7 + 8 City	October 22, 2018	June 2, 2022	Independent		Black Canadian (Jamaican)

=== Calgary ===
Portrait	City councillor	Ward	Took office	Left office	Party	Ref.	Note
	Virnetta Anderson (1920–2006)	Ward 3	October 28, 1974	October 30, 1977	Independent		Black Canadian (African-American)
	John Mar	Ward 8	October 15, 2007	October 20, 2013	Independent		Chinese Canadian
	Naheed Nenshi નાહિદ કુર્બન નેનશી (born 1972)	Mayor	October 25, 2010	October 25, 2021	Independent		Tanzanian Canadian (Gujarati)
	Sean Chu	Ward 4	October 21, 2013	October 29, 2025	Independent		Taiwanese Canadian
	Jyoti Gondek (born 1969)	Ward 3	October 16, 2017	October 25, 2021	Independent		Indian Canadian (Punjabi)
	Jyoti Gondek (born 1969)	Mayor	October 25, 2021	October 29, 2025	Independent		Indian Canadian (Punjabi)
	George Chahal (born 1975)	Ward 5	October 16, 2017	October 25, 2021	Independent		Indian Canadian (Punjabi)

=== Edmonton ===
Portrait	City councillor	Ward	Took office	Left office	Party	Ref.	Note
	Amarjeet Sohi ਅਮਰਜੀਤ ਸੋਹੀ (born 1964)	Mayor	October 26, 2021	October 29, 2025	Independent		Indian Canadian (Punjabi)
	Keren Tang	Karhiio	October 26, 2021	Incumbent	Independent		Chinese Canadian
	Jennifer Rice	Ipiihkoohkanipiaohtsi	October 26, 2021	Incumbent	Independent		Chinese Canadian

=== Montreal ===
Portrait	City councillor	Ward	Took office	Left office	Party	Ref.	Note
	Noushig Eloyan	Bordeaux-Cartierville; Ahuntsic-Cartierville	November 2, 1994	November 1, 2009	Vision Montréal		Armenian Canadian
	Alan DeSousa ایلن دے سوسا (born 1959)	Borough Mayor; Saint-Laurent	November 1, 2002	Incumbent	Ensemble Montréal		Pakistani Canadian
	Soraya Martinez Ferrada (born 1972)	Saint-Michel; Villeray–Saint-Michel–Parc-Extension	November 6, 2005	November 1, 2009	Vision Montréal		Chilean Canadian
	Frantz Benjamin	Saint-Michel; Villeray–Saint-Michel–Parc-Extension	November 2, 2009	October 1, 2018	Ensemble Montréal		Black Canadian (Haitian)
	Harout Chitilian; Հարութ Շիթիլեան (born 1980)	Bordeaux-Cartierville; Ahuntsic-Cartierville	November 2, 2009	November 4, 2017	Ensemble Montréal		Armenian Canadian
	Aref Salem	Norman-McLaren; Saint-Laurent	November 2, 2009	Incumbent	Ensemble Montréal		Lebanese Canadian
	Abdelhaq Sari	Marie-Clarac; Montréal-Nord	November 5, 2017	Incumbent	Ensemble Montréal		Moroccan Canadian
	Cathy Wong	Peter-McGill; Ville-Marie	November 5, 2017	November 7, 2021	Projet Montreal		Chinese Canadian
	Josué Corvil	Saint-Michel; Villeray–Saint-Michel–Parc-Extension	December 16, 2018	Incumbent	Ensemble Montréal		Black Canadian (Haitian)
	Alba Zuniga Ramos	Louis-Riel; Mercier–Hochelaga-Maisonneuve	November 7, 2021	Incumbent	Ensemble Montréal		Colombian Canadian
	Josefina Blanco	Saint-Édouard; Rosemont–La Petite-Patrie	November 7, 2021	Incumbent	Projet Montreal		Argentinean Canadian
	Alia Hassan-Cournol	Maisonneuve–Longue-Pointe; Mercier–Hochelaga-Maisonneuve	November 7, 2021	Incumbent	Projet Montreal		Egyptian Canadian
	Stéphanie Valenzuela	Darlington; Côte-des-Neiges–Notre-Dame-de-Grâce	November 7, 2021	Incumbent	Ensemble Montréal		Filipino Canadian
	Gracia Kasoki Katahwa	Borough Mayor; Côte-des-Neiges–Notre-Dame-de-Grâce	November 7, 2021	Incumbent	Projet Montreal		Black Canadian (Congolese)
	Martine Musau Muele	Villeray; Villeray–Saint-Michel–Parc-Extension	November 7, 2021	Incumbent	Projet Montreal		Black Canadian (Congolese)
	Ericka Alneus	Étienne-Desmarteau; Rosemont–La Petite-Patrie	November 7, 2021	Incumbent	Projet Montreal		Black Canadian (Haitian)
	Dominique Ollivier	Vieux-Rosement; Rosemont–La Petite-Patrie	November 7, 2021	Incumbent	Projet Montreal		Black Canadian (Haitian)
	Tan Shan Li 李丹珊	Saint-Henri-Est–Petite-Bourgogne–Pointe-Saint-Charles–Griffintown; Le Sud-Ouest	November 7, 2021	Incumbent	Projet Montreal		Chinese-Canadian (Taishanese)

=== Ottawa ===
Portrait	City councillor	Ward	Took office	Left office	Ref.	Note
	Mac Harb ماك حرب (born 1953)	Dalhousie	December 1, 1985	November 21, 1988		Lebanese-Canadian
	Ruth Wildgen (née Besharah) (1921–1999)	Britannia	December 1, 1985	December 1, 1988		Lebanese-Canadian
	Eli El-Chantiry (born 1957)	West Carleton-March	December 1, 2003	November 15, 2022		Lebanese-Canadian
	Shad Qadri شاد قادری (born 1952)	Stittsville	December 1, 2006	December 1, 2018		Pakistani-Canadian
	George Darouze (born 1964)	Osgoode	December 1, 2014	February 27, 2025		Lebanese-Canadian
	Michael Qaqish (born 1985)	Gloucester-South Nepean	December 1, 2014	December 1, 2018		Jordanian-Canadian
	Rawlson King	Rideau-Rockcliffe	April 16, 2019	Incumbent		Black Canadian (Vincentian & Aruban)
	Mark Sutcliffe (born 1968)	Mayor	November 15, 2022	Incumbent		Chinese Canadian
	Wilson Lo (born 1991)	Barrhaven East	November 15, 2022	Incumbent		Chinese Canadian (Hong Kong)

=== Toronto ===
Portrait	City councillor	Ward	Took office	Left office	Party	Ref.	Note
	Bas Balkissoon (born 1952)	Ward 41; Scarborough—Rouge River	December 1, 1988	November 24, 2005	Independent		Trinidadian Canadian
	Sherene Shaw	Ward 39; Scarborough—Agincourt	December 1, 1988	November 30, 2003	Independent		Guyanese Canadian
	Raymond Cho 조성준 (born 1936)	Ward 42; Scarborough—Rouge River	December 1, 1991	September 1, 2016	Independent		Korean Canadian
	Olivia Chow 鄒至蕙 (born 1957)	Ward 20; Trinity—Spadina	December 1, 1991	November 28, 2005	Independent		Chinese Canadian (Cantonese) First Visible Minority Mayor of Toronto First Chinese-Canadian Mayor of Toronto
	Olivia Chow 鄒至蕙 (born 1957)	Mayor	July 12, 2023	Incumbent	Independent		Chinese Canadian (Cantonese) First Visible Minority Mayor of Toronto First Chinese-Canadian Mayor of Toronto
	Rob Davis (born 1964)	Ward 28; York Eglinton	December 1, 1991	November 30, 2000	Independent		Black Canadian
	Gordon Chong (1943–2018)	Ward 11; Don Parkway	December 1, 1994	November 30, 2000	Independent		Chinese Canadian (Cantonese)
	Denzil Minnan-Wong 黃旻南	Don Valley East	December 1, 2000	December 1, 2022	Independent		Chinese Canadian (Cantonese)
	Cesar Palacio	Ward 17; Davenport	December 1, 2003	November 30, 2018	Independent		Ecuadorian Canadian
	Michael Thompson	Ward 21; Scarborough Centre	December 1, 2003	Incumbent	Independent		Black Canadian (Jamaican)
	Chin Lee 李振光	Ward 41; Scarborough—Rouge River	December 1, 2006	May 11, 2018	Independent		Malaysian Canadian (Chinese)
	Kristyn Wong-Tam (born 1971)	Ward 13; Toronto Centre	December 1, 2010	May 4, 2022	Independent		Chinese Canadian (Cantonese)
	Ceta Ramkhalawansingh	Ward 28; Trinity—Spadina	July 7, 2014	November 30, 2014	Independent		Trindadian Canadian; Appointed to complete the term of councillor Adam Vaughan
	Neethan Shan நீதன் சண்முகராஜா (born 1978)	Ward 42; Scarborough—Rouge River	February 13, 2017	November 30, 2018	Independent		Sri Lankan Canadian (Tamil)
	Jonathan Tsao (born 1987)	Ward 33; Don Valley East	May 22, 2018	November 30, 2018	Independent		Chinese Canadian; Appointed to complete the term of councillor Shelley Carroll
	Migan Megardichian	Ward 41; Scarborough—Rouge River	June 26, 2018	November 30, 2018	Independent		Armenian Canadian; Appointed to complete the term of councillor Chin Lee
	Cynthia Lai 封賴桂霞 (1954–2022)	Ward 23; Scarborough North	December 1, 2018	October 1, 2022	Independent		Chinese Canadian (Cantonese)
	Amber Morley	Ward 3 Etobicoke—Lakeshore	December 1, 2022	Incumbent	Independent		Black Canadian
	Alejandra Bravo (born 1971)	Ward 9 Davenport	December 1, 2022	Incumbent	Independent		Chilean Canadian
	Ausma Malik اسما ملک (born 1983)	Ward 10; Spadina—Fort York	December 1, 2022	Incumbent	Independent		Pakistani Canadian
	Chris Moise	Ward 13; Toronto Centre	December 1, 2022	Incumbent	Independent		Black Canadian
	Lily Cheng	Ward 18; Willowdale	December 1, 2022	Incumbent	Independent		Chinese Canadian
	Jamaal Myers	Ward 23; Scarborough North	December 1, 2022	Incumbent	Independent		Black Canadian (Jamaican)

=== Vancouver ===
Portrait	City councillor	Position	Took office	Left office	Party	Ref.	Note
	Setty Pendakur	Councillor	1972	1976	TEAM		Indian Canadian (Kannadiga)
	Tung Chan	Councillor	1990	1993	NPA		Chinese-Canadian
	Maggie Ip	Councillor	1993	1996	NPA		Chinese-Canadian
	Jenny Kwan 關慧貞 (born 1967)	Councillor	1993	1996	COPE		Chinese-Canadian (Cantonese)
	Don Lee	Councillor	1996	2002	NPA		Chinese-Canadian
	Daniel Lee	Councillor	1996	2002	NPA		Chinese-Canadian
	Raymond Louie (born 1965)	Councillor	December 2, 2002	November 5, 2018	Vision; COPE (2002–2005)		Chinese-Canadian
	George Chow	Councillor	November 19, 2005	December 8, 2008	Vision		Chinese-Canadian
	B.C. Lee (1954–2019)	Councillor	November 19, 2005	December 8, 2008	NPA		Taiwanese-Canadian
	Kerry Jang	Councillor	December 8, 2008	November 5, 2018	Vision		Chinese-Canadian
	Tony Tang	Councillor	2011	2014	Vision		Chinese-Canadian
	Pete Fry	Councillor	November 5, 2018	November 2, 2026	Green Party		Trinidadian Canadian
	Pete Fry	Mayor	November 2, 2026	Incumbent	Green Party		Trinidadian Canadian
	Ken Sim 沈觀健 (born 1970)	Mayor	November 7, 2022	November 2, 2026	ABC Vancouver		Chinese Canadian
	Lenny Zhou	Councillor	November 7, 2022	November 2, 2026	ABC Vancouver		Chinese Canadian
	Solomon Yi-Kieran	Councillor	November 2, 2026	Incumbent	COPE		Chinese Canadian
	Devyani Singh	Councillor	November 2, 2026	Incumbent	COPE		Indian Canadian

=== Winnipeg ===
Portrait	City councillor	Ward	Took office	Left office	Party	Ref.	Note
	Mike Pagtakhan	Point Douglas	October 23, 2002	October 23, 2018	Independent		Filipino Canadian
	Devi Sharma	Old Kildonan	October 27, 2010	Incumbent	Independent		Indian Canadian (Hindavi)
	Markus Chambers	St. Norbert-Seine River	October 24, 2018	Incumbent	Independent		Black Canadian (Jamaican)
	Vivian Santos	Point Douglas	October 24, 2018	Incumbent	Independent		Filipino Canadian

== See also ==
- List of electoral firsts in Canada
- List of Jewish Canadian politicians
- List of indigenous Canadian politicians
- List of visible minority political party leaders in Canada
