= Edmonton—Sherwood Park =

Edmonton—Sherwood Park may refer to either of two electoral districts in Canada:

- Edmonton—Sherwood Park (federal electoral district)
- Edmonton-Sherwood Park (provincial electoral district)
