= Devinder Toor =

Canadian politician

Member of the Legislative Assembly of Alberta for Calgary-Falconridge
- In office April 16, 2019 – May 29, 2023
- Preceded by: Prabhdeep Gill
- Succeeded by: Parmeet Singh Boparai

Personal details
- Born: 1967 or 1968 (age 58–59) India
- Party: United Conservative Party
- Other political affiliations: Wildrose (2015–17)
- Occupation: Businessman

Devinder Toor is a Canadian politician who was elected in the 2019 Alberta general election to represent the electoral district of Calgary-Falconridge in the 30th Alberta Legislature. He ran for re-election in 2023 but was defeated.

Toor supported Danielle Smith in the UCP leadership race and was an early supporter of the Alberta Sovereignty Within a United Canada Act.

Toor was the Parliamentary Secretary for Multiculturalism and was a member of the Social Services Cabinet Policy Committee, Standing Committee on Legislative Offices and Standing Committee on Public Accounts. He previously was on the Standing Committee on Alberta’s Economic Future.

As MLA, Toor advocated for issues such as reducing crime, more access to charter schools, and lowering taxes.

== Personal life ==
Toor was born in India. Prior to his election, he owned his own business. He has a Bachelor of Science degree in pharmacy. He and his wife Baljeet have two children together.

== Electoral history ==
=== 2023 general election ===
2023 Alberta general election: Calgary-Falconridge
Party	Candidate	Votes	%	±%
New Democratic	Parmeet Singh Boparai	7,786	56.39	+11.45
United Conservative	Devinder Toor	5,476	39.66	-5.89
Independent	Kyle Kennedy	252	1.83	–
Green	Ahmed Hassan	203	1.47	–
Solidarity Movement	Evan Wilson	91	0.66	–
Total		13,808	99.22	–
Rejected and declined		109	0.78	
Turnout		13,917	48.53	
Eligible electors		28,680		
New Democratic gain from United Conservative		Swing		+8.67
Source(s) Source: Elections Alberta

=== 2019 general election ===
2019 Alberta general election: Calgary-Falconridge
Party	Candidate	Votes	%	±%	Expenditures
United Conservative	Devinder Toor	6,753	45.55	-7.41	$49,521
New Democratic	Parmeet Singh Boparai	6,662	44.94	+10.77	$40,165
Alberta Party	Jasbir Dhari	849	5.73	–	$12,992
Liberal	Deepak Sharma	561	3.78	-5.31	$4,146
Total		14,825	99.07	–	
Rejected, spoiled and declined		139	0.93		
Turnout		14,964	51.87		
Eligible voters		28,849			
United Conservative notional hold		Swing		-9.09	
Source(s) Source: Elections Alberta Note: Expenses is the sum of "Election Expenses", "Other Expenses" and "Transfers Issued". The Elections Act limits "Election Expenses" to $50,000.

=== 2016 by-election ===
Alberta provincial by-election, March 22, 2016: Calgary-Greenway Death of Manmeet Bhullar
Party	Candidate	Votes	%	±%
Progressive Conservative	Prabhdeep Gill	2,292	27.73	-15.04
Wildrose	Devinder Toor	1,957	23.68	+2.62
Liberal	Khalil Karbani	1,870	22.63	-
New Democratic	Roop Rai	1,667	20.17	-16.00
Green	Thana Boonlert	166	2.01	-
Independent	Said Hussein Abdulbaki	146	1.77	-
Independent	Larry Heather	106	1.28	-
Independent	Sukhi Rai	61	0.74	-
Total valid votes		8,265	100.00	
Total rejected, unmarked and declined ballots				
Turnout			29.23	
Eligible voters		28,278		
Progressive Conservative hold		Swing		-8.83

=== 2015 general election ===
2015 Alberta general election: Calgary-Greenway
Party	Candidate	Votes	%
Progressive Conservative	Manmeet Bhullar	5,337	43.0
New Democratic	Don Monroe	4,513	36.2
Wildrose	Devinder Toor	2,627	21.1
Total valid votes		12,477	100.0
Rejected, spoiled and declined		146	
Turnout		12,623	41.3
Eligible voters		30,600	
Source: Elections Alberta
