= Prab Gill =

Canadian politician

Prabhdeep Gill

Member of the Legislative Assembly of Alberta for Calgary-Greenway
- In office April 12, 2016 – March 19, 2019
- Preceded by: Manmeet Bhullar
- Succeeded by: Devinder Toor

Personal details
- Born: 1974 or 1975 (age 51–52)
- Party: Independent
- Other political affiliations: United Conservative (2017–2018)
- Education: Guru Nanak Dev University; University of British Columbia
- Occupation: Real Estate Appraiser (AIC)

Prabhdeep Gill (born c. 1975) is a Canadian politician and a Member of the Legislative Assembly of Alberta. He was elected in the 2016 Calgary-Greenway by-election to replace Manmeet Bhullar, who had died in a car accident between Calgary and Edmonton.

== Background ==
Gill was a member of the Appeals Panel for Human Services Alberta, prior to being elected as a Member of the Legislative Assembly.

== Political career ==
Gill won the nomination for the PC candidate in the 2016 Calgary-Greenway byelection, after being first appointed by the party. The initial appointment drew controversy, as it appeared that the party establishment was preventing an open nomination process. As such, Gill's initial nomination was withdrawn by interim leader Ric McIver, though he won the nomination by election two days after. Gill was elected in the by-election with 27.73% of the popular vote, finishing four points ahead of Devinder Toor, the Wildrose Party candidate, and almost 8 points ahead of Roop Rai, the New Democrat candidate, whose party held a majority in the Legislature at that time. Gill's by-election win allowed the PCs to maintain their legislative caucus of 9 members.

== Electoral history ==
=== 2016 by-election ===
Alberta provincial by-election, March 22, 2016: Calgary-Greenway
Party	Candidate	Votes	%	±%
Progressive Conservative	Prabhdeep Gill	2,292	27.73	-15.04
Wildrose	Devinder Toor	1,957	23.68	+2.62
Liberal	Khalil Karbani	1,870	22.63	-
New Democratic	Roop Rai	1,667	20.17	-16.00
Green	Thana Boonlert	166	2.01	-
Independent	Said Hussein Abdulbaki	146	1.77	-
Independent	Larry Heather	106	1.28	-
Independent	Sukhi Rai	61	0.74	-
Total valid votes		8,265	100.00	
Total rejected, unmarked and declined ballots				
Turnout			29.23	
Eligible voters		28,278		
Progressive Conservative hold		Swing		-8.83
