= Calgary-Greenway =

Provincial electoral district in Alberta, Canada

Coordinates: 51.08°N 113.93°W

Alberta electoral district
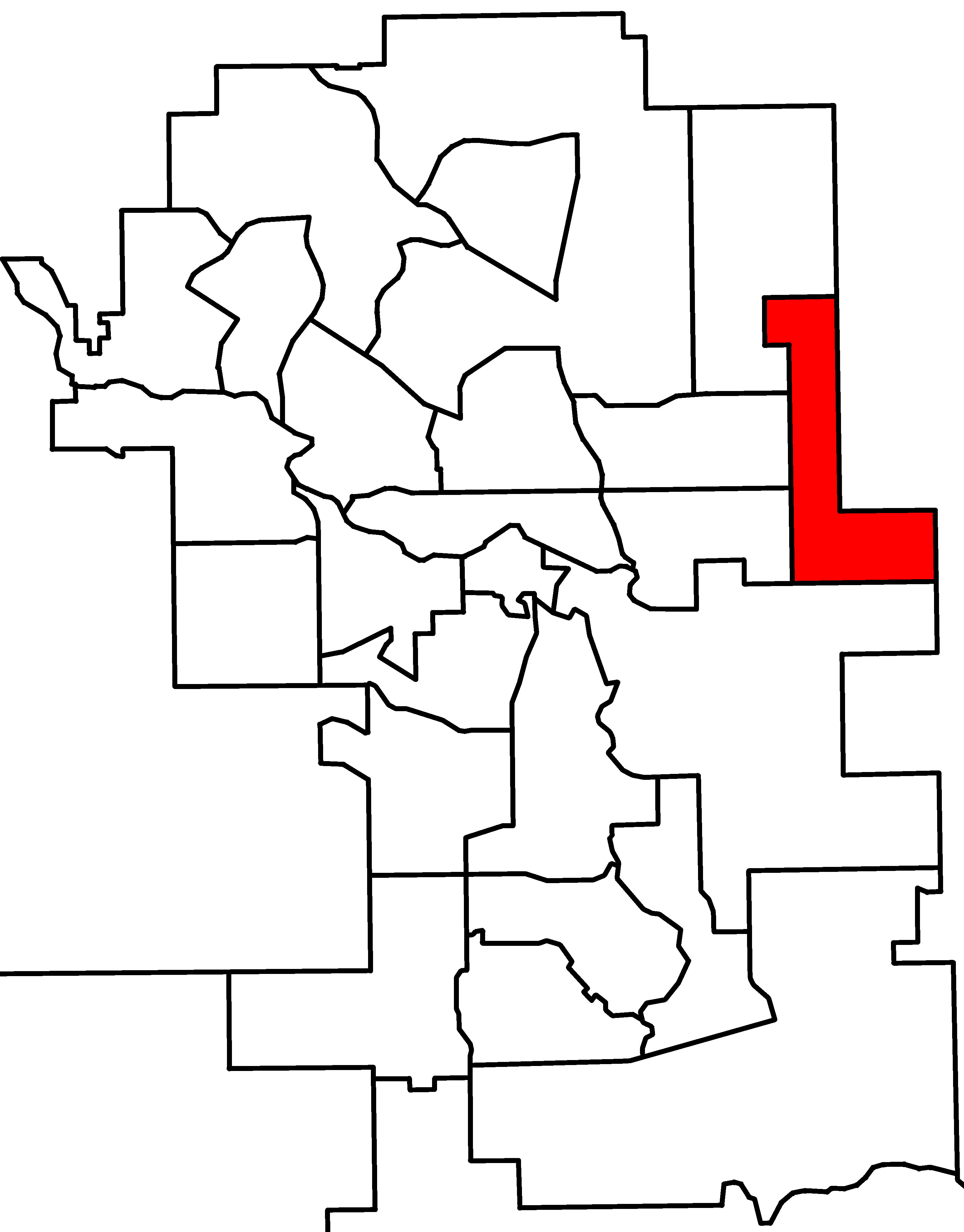
- 2010 boundaries

Defunct provincial electoral district
- Legislature: Legislative Assembly of Alberta
- District created: 2010
- District abolished: 2019
- First contested: 2012
- Last contested: 2015

Calgary-Greenway was a provincial electoral district in Calgary, Alberta, Canada. The district was created in the 2010 boundary redistribution and is mandated to return a single member to the Legislative Assembly of Alberta using the first-past-the-post voting system.

The district includes the neighbourhoods of Taradale, Coral Springs, Monterey Park, Abbeydale, and Applewood Park.

== History ==
The electoral district was created in the 2010 Alberta boundary re-distribution. It was created from parts of Calgary-Cross, Calgary-McCall and Calgary-Montrose which was completely abolished.

=== Boundary history ===
14 Calgary-Greenway 2010 boundaries
Bordering districts
| North | East | West | South |
|---|---|---|---|
| Calgary-McCall | Chestermere-Rocky View | Calgary-Cross, Calgary-East and Calgary-McCall | Calgary-Fort |
Legal description from the Statutes of Alberta 2010, Electoral Divisions Act.

=== Electoral history ===
Members of the Legislative Assembly for Calgary-Greenway
| Assembly | Years | Member | Party |
|---|---|---|---|
See Calgary-Cross 1993–2012, Calgary-McCall 1971–2012 and Calgary-Montrose 1986–2012
| 28th | 2012–2015 | Manmeet Bhullar | Progressive Conservative |
| 29th | 2015 | Manmeet Bhullar | Progressive Conservative |
| 29th | 2016–2017 | Prabhdeep Gill | Progressive Conservative |
| 29th | 2017–2018 | Prabhdeep Gill | United Conservative |
| 29th | 2018–2019 | Prabhdeep Gill | Independent |
See Calgary-Cross, Calgary-Falconridge and Calgary-East 2019–

The antecedent electoral districts that comprise Calgary-Greenway have been returning Progressive Conservative candidates to office since the 1970s. Greenway was represented by Manmeet Bhullar until his death on November 23, 2015. He was first elected in a closely contested election in 2008 in the old riding of Calgary-Montrose. Prabhdeep Gill won the subsequent by-election for the PCs, which saw a slight increase in support for the Wildrose and a decrease of support for the Progressive Conservatives and the New Democrats from the 2015 election.

== Legislative election results ==
=== 2016 by-election ===
Alberta provincial by-election, March 22, 2016 Death of Manmeet Bhullar
| Party | Candidate | Votes | % | ±% |
|---|---|---|---|---|
| Progressive Conservative | Prabhdeep Gill | 2,292 | 27.73 | -15.04 |
| Wildrose | Devinder Toor | 1,957 | 23.68 | +2.62 |
| Liberal | Khalil Karbani | 1,870 | 22.63 | - |
| New Democratic | Roop Rai | 1,667 | 20.17 | -16.00 |
| Green | Thana Boonlert | 166 | 2.01 | - |
| Independent | Said Hussein Abdulbaki | 146 | 1.77 | - |
| Independent | Larry Heather | 106 | 1.28 | - |
| Independent | Sukhi Rai | 61 | 0.74 | - |
| Total valid votes | | 8,265 | 100.00 | |
| Total rejected, unmarked and declined ballots | | | | |
| Turnout | | | 29.23 | |
| Eligible voters | | 28,278 | | |
| Progressive Conservative hold | | Swing | | -8.83 |

=== 2015 ===
2015 Alberta general election
| Party | Candidate | Votes | % |
|---|---|---|---|
| Progressive Conservative | Manmeet Bhullar | 5,337 | 43.0 |
| New Democratic | Don Monroe | 4,513 | 36.2 |
| Wildrose | Devinder Toor | 2,627 | 21.1 |
| Total valid votes | | 12,477 | 100.0 |
| Rejected, spoiled and declined | | 146 | |
| Turnout | | 12,623 | 41.3 |
| Eligible voters | | 30,600 | |
Source: Elections Alberta

=== 2012 ===
2012 Alberta general election
| Party | Candidate | Votes | % |
|---|---|---|---|
| Progressive Conservative | Manmeet Bhullar | 6,538 | 54.08 |
| Wildrose | Ron Leech | 3,893 | 32.21 |
| Liberal | Iqtidar Awan | 1,249 | 10.33 |
| New Democratic | Al Brown | 409 | 3.38 |
| Total valid votes | | 12,090 | 100.00 |
| Total rejected, unmarked and declined ballots | | 161 | 1.31 |
| Turnout | | 12,251 | 45.68 |
| Eligible voters | | 26,817 | |
| Progressive Conservative pickup new district. | | | |

== See also ==
- List of Alberta provincial electoral districts
- Canadian provincial electoral districts
