= Parmeet Singh Boparai =

Canadian politician from Alberta

Member of the Legislative Assembly of Alberta for Calgary-Falconridge
- Incumbent
- Assumed office May 29, 2023
- Preceded by: Devinder Toor

Personal details
- Born: Ludhiana, Punjab, India
- Party: NDP
- Occupation: Engineer, businessperson

Parmeet Singh Boparai is a Canadian politician from the Alberta New Democratic Party. He was elected as a Member of the Legislative Assembly of Alberta for Calgary-Falconridge in the 2023 Alberta general election. As of June 21, 2024, he serves as the Official Opposition critic for Service Alberta as well as for Consumer Protection.

== Electoral history ==
2023 Alberta general election: Calgary-Falconridge
Party	Candidate	Votes	%	±%
New Democratic	Parmeet Singh Boparai	7,786	56.39	+11.45
United Conservative	Devinder Toor	5,476	39.66	-5.89
Independent	Kyle Kennedy	252	1.83	–
Green	Ahmed Hassan	203	1.47	–
Solidarity Movement	Evan Wilson	91	0.66	–
Total		13,808	99.22	–
Rejected and declined		109	0.78	
Turnout		13,917	48.53	
Eligible electors		28,680		
New Democratic gain from United Conservative		Swing		+8.67
Source(s) Source: Elections Alberta

2019 Alberta general election: Calgary-Falconridge
Party	Candidate	Votes	%	±%	Expenditures
United Conservative	Devinder Toor	6,753	45.55	-7.41	$49,521
New Democratic	Parmeet Singh Boparai	6,662	44.94	+10.77	$40,165
Alberta Party	Jasbir Dhari	849	5.73	–	$12,992
Liberal	Deepak Sharma	561	3.78	-5.31	$4,146
Total		14,825	99.07	–	
Rejected, spoiled and declined		139	0.93		
Turnout		14,964	51.87		
Eligible voters		28,849			
United Conservative notional hold		Swing		-9.09	
Source(s) Source: Elections Alberta Note: Expenses is the sum of "Election Expenses", "Other Expenses" and "Transfers Issued". The Elections Act limits "Election Expenses" to $50,000.
