= Henry Woo =

Canadian politician

MLA for Edmonton-Sherwood Park
- In office 1979–1986
- Preceded by: New District
- Succeeded by: District Abolished

Personal details
- Born: March 18, 1929 Lethbridge, Alberta
- Died: November 24, 2014 (aged 85)
- Party: Progressive Conservative

Henry Woo (Chinese: 胡建華 (March 18, 1929 – November 24, 2014) was a provincial level politician from Alberta, Canada. He was born in Lethbridge, Alberta and he served as a member of the Legislative Assembly of Alberta from 1979 to 1986. During his time in the legislature he sat in the back benches as a member of the governing Progressive Conservative party.

== Political career ==
Woo ran for a seat to the Alberta Legislature in the 1979 Alberta general election. He won the new electoral district of Edmonton-Sherwood Park to pick it up for the governing Progressive Conservatives.

In the 2nd Legislative Session Woo presented a petition of over 11,000 signatures to the Assembly to prevent the City of Edmonton annexing Strathcona County.

Woo ran for a second term in the 1982 general election. He won re-election with a very high plurality of votes. He retired from provincial politics at dissolution of the legislature in 1986. He was named to the Order of Canada in 1989. Woo died at the age of 85 on November 24, 2014.
