= Calgary-Falconridge =

Provincial electoral district in Alberta, Canada

Alberta electoral district
- Calgary-Falconridge within the City of Calgary (2017 boundaries)

Provincial electoral district
- Legislature: Legislative Assembly of Alberta
MLA
Parmeet Singh Boparai
New Democratic
- District created: 2017
- First contested: 2019
- Last contested: 2023

Demographics
- Population (2016): 52,688
- Area (km²): 15.1
- Pop. density (per km²): 3,489.3

Calgary-Falconridge is a provincial electoral district in Alberta, Canada. The district will be one of 87 districts mandated to return a single member (MLA) to the Legislative Assembly of Alberta using the first past the post method of voting. It was contested for the first time in the 2019 Alberta election.

== Geography ==
The district is located in northeastern Calgary, containing the neighbourhoods of Whitehorn, Temple, Castleridge, Falconridge, Coral Springs, and the eastern part of Taradale.

== History ==
Members for Calgary-Falconridge
Assembly	Years	Member	Party
See Calgary-Cross 1993-2019, Calgary-McCall 1971-2019, and Calgary-Greenway 2012–2019
30th	2019–2023	Devinder Toor	United Conservative
31st	2023–	Parmeet Singh Boparai	New Democrat

The district was created in 2017 when the Electoral Boundaries Commission recommended reorganizing the districts in northeast Calgary, abolishing Calgary-Greenway and shifting the other ridings eastward. Calgary-Falconridge took the neighbourhoods of Whitehorn and Temple from Calgary-East, Castleridge and Falconridge from Calgary-McCall, and Coral Springs and part of Taradale from Calgary-Greenway. This resulted in a district 13% above the average population, but the Commission justified this by pointing out that there were no plans to build new housing stock in this area.

== Electoral results ==
=== 2026 ===
2026 Independence Referendum
85.46%	14.54%
Remain	Referendum

=== 2023 ===
2023 Alberta general election
Party	Candidate	Votes	%	±%
New Democratic	Parmeet Singh Boparai	7,786	56.39	+11.45
United Conservative	Devinder Toor	5,476	39.66	-5.89
Independent	Kyle Kennedy	252	1.83	–
Green	Ahmed Hassan	203	1.47	–
Solidarity Movement	Evan Wilson	91	0.66	–
Total		13,808	99.22	–
Rejected and declined		109	0.78	
Turnout		13,917	48.53	
Eligible electors		28,680		
New Democratic gain from United Conservative		Swing		+8.67
Source(s) Source: Elections Alberta

=== 2019 ===
2019 Alberta general election
Party	Candidate	Votes	%	±%	Expenditures
United Conservative	Devinder Toor	6,753	45.55	-7.41	$49,521
New Democratic	Parmeet Singh Boparai	6,662	44.94	+10.77	$40,165
Alberta Party	Jasbir Dhari	849	5.73	–	$12,992
Liberal	Deepak Sharma	561	3.78	-5.31	$4,146
Total		14,825	99.07	–	
Rejected, spoiled and declined		139	0.93		
Turnout		14,964	51.87		
Eligible voters		28,849			
United Conservative notional hold		Swing		-9.09	
Source(s) Source: Elections Alberta Note: Expenses is the sum of "Election Expenses", "Other Expenses" and "Transfers Issued". The Elections Act limits "Election Expenses" to $50,000.

=== 2015 ===
Redistributed results, 2015 Alberta general election
Party	Votes	%
New Democratic	4,615	34.16
Progressive Conservative	4,374	32.38
Wildrose	2,780	20.58
Liberal	1,229 (Note: There was no Liberal candidate in Calgary-Greenway.)	9.10
Green	84 (Note: The Greens only ran a candidate in Calgary-Cross)	0.62
Independent	339 (Note: Includes candidates in Calgary-East and Calgary Cross)	2.51
Source(s) Source: Ridingbuilder

== See also ==
- List of Alberta provincial electoral districts
- Canadian provincial electoral districts
