= Manmeet Bhullar =

Canadian politician

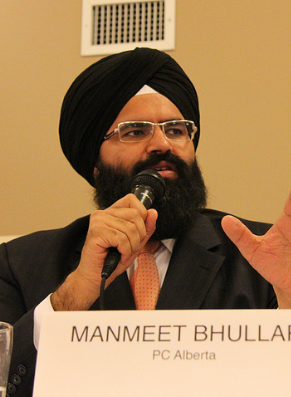

Member of the Legislative Assembly of Alberta for Calgary-Greenway
- In office March 3, 2008 – November 23, 2015
- Preceded by: Hung Pham
- Succeeded by: Prabhdeep Gill

Minister of Human Services
- In office December 13, 2013 – May 24, 2015
- Preceded by: Dave Hancock
- Succeeded by: Irfan Sabir

Minister of Service Alberta
- In office October 12, 2011 – December 13, 2013
- Preceded by: Heather Klimchuk
- Succeeded by: Doug Griffiths

Personal details
- Born: Manmeet Singh Bhullar; March 1, 1980 Calgary, Alberta, Canada
- Died: November 23, 2015 (aged 35) Red Deer County, Alberta, Canada
- Party: Progressive Conservative
- Education: University of Windsor
- Profession: Lawyer

Manmeet Singh Bhullar (March 1, 1980 – November 23, 2015) was a Canadian politician and Member of the Legislative Assembly of Alberta who represented the constituency of Calgary-Greenway as a Progressive Conservative. He served as a cabinet minister from 2011 until the defeat of the Progressive Conservative government in 2015. He was widely seen as a rising star in the Progressive Conservative caucus. Bhullar was killed when he was struck by a tractor trailer on a road when he went to help a stranded motorist on November 23, 2015.

== Early life ==
Bhullar was born March 1, 1980, in the community of Penbrooke Meadows in Calgary. His family then moved to the community of Whitehorn where he attended Chief Justice Milvain School and Annie Gale Junior High School. Manmeet then attended Lester B. Pearson High School in Pineridge, where he was a member of the school's football team.

== Education ==
Bhullar earned his Bachelor of Arts with a Sociology concentration from Athabasca University in 2005. Bhullar also attended Mount Royal University as part of his post-secondary education. In 2011, Bhullar received his Bachelor of Laws from the University of Windsor.

== Community involvement ==
Manmeet became very active in the community early on. Bhullar was the founder of a youth organization called "Inspire." Bhullar co-ordinated the Walking Hunger Away campaign in Calgary and led a team of volunteers to raise money on behalf of the Calgary Health Region. Bhullar also worked with other youth groups in that time. Because of his community work Bhullar was a recipient of the Alberta Centennial Medal, the Centennial Medallion, and the Athabasca University Leadership Award. Bhullar has been a strong advocate for the issues of East Calgarians in the Alberta legislature.

== Political life ==
Bhullar became active in politics early on by helping Rick D. Orman, the first MLA for Calgary-Montrose, in his re-election campaign. While seeking his post-secondary education, Bhullar was an organizer for Jim Prentice's leadership campaign for the Progressive Conservative Party of Canada in 2003.

Bhullar then worked with Jim Prentice when he was MP for Calgary Centre-North, aiding him with his role as Regional Minister for Alberta and the Territories.

Bhullar first sought public office in the 2008 provincial election in the constituency of Calgary-Montrose. At 28 years of age, he became the youngest member elected to Alberta's 27th legislature. He was appointed to the position of Parliamentary Assistant to the Minister of Advanced Education and Technology on March 12, 2008, making him the youngest politician to serve as a parliamentary assistant or secretary in Canada at the time. In January 2010 he was made Parliamentary Assistant to Municipal Affairs.

== Minister of Service Alberta ==
On October 12, 2011, Bhullar was appointed to Cabinet as Minister of Service Alberta making him the first turbaned Sikh to hold a ministerial position. In this portfolio, Bhullar oversaw the province's vast network of registry agents, led Alberta's open government initiative and was the lead consumer advocate in government. He is credited with finishing the "final mile" that has connected 98% of Albertans to high-speed internet and for pushing the CRTC to implement a national wireless code to protect mobile phone users. Bhullar also received accolades for his work to crack down on unscrupulous contractors taking advantage of citizens after Alberta's flooding in 2013 and for laying the groundwork for a stronger condominium act, including a new dispute resolution system for condominium owners.

== Minister of Human Services ==
On December 13, 2013, Bhullar was promoted to the position of Minister of Human Services putting him in charge of the third largest ministry by expenditures in government and overseeing more than 4,000 employees. There he has been credited with fixing Alberta's child intervention system. He changed the law to empower families to speak up about their experiences with the system, made new investments in mental health supports for families involved in child intervention, hosted the first ever Alberta Minister's Forum on Child Sexual Abuse and began a campaign to find a mentor for every child in care in the province.

== Minister of Infrastructure ==
Bhullar was appointed as Minister of Infrastructure in Fall 2014 by newly elected premier Jim Prentice. He held the position until dissolution of the Legislature in 2015.

== Opposition ==
Bhullar was one of only 10 Progressive Conservative MLAs who were returned in the 2015 provincial election that defeated the Prentice government. He sat on the opposition benches in the Alberta legislature until his death.

== Death ==
Bhullar died in a motor vehicle collision north of Red Deer, Alberta while driving from Calgary to Edmonton in bad weather on the Queen Elizabeth II highway, on November 23, 2015. Bhullar had stopped to assist a driver involved in a collision and sustained fatal injuries after he was struck by a semi truck that had lost control descending a hill.

== Legacy ==
In 2015, the Lester B. Pearson High School Manmeet Singh Bhullar Memorial Scholarship was created by the teacher Sunny Minhas. On June 30, 2016, the Calgary Board of Education announced a new public elementary school in the Martindale neighborhood would be named after Bhullar. The school was opened in September 2016. On November 19, 2016, the Calgary Board of Education Legacy Award was posthumously awarded to Bhullar. In 2017, the Mount Royal University Manmeet Singh Bhullar Inspire Award was started by the Mount Royal University Sikh Students Association. In January 2019, a park named after Bhullar was opened in Rotary-Mattamy Greenway in Taradale, Calgary, close to where Bhullar and his wife lived. In December 2021, the constituency Calgary-McCall was renamed to Calgary-Bhullar-McCall.

== Election results ==
2008 Alberta general election: Calgary-Montrose
Party	Candidate	Votes	%	±%
Progressive Conservative	Manmeet Bhullar	2,627	34.45%	-16.84%
Independent	Ron Leech	2,010	26.36%	–
Liberal	Michael Embaie	1,396	18.31%	-7.80%
Wildrose Alliance	Said Abdulbaki	818	10.73%	0.09%
New Democratic	Al Brown	512	6.71%	0.23%
Green	Fred Clemens	262	3.44%	2.04%
Total		7,625	–	–
Rejected, spoiled and declined		55	–	–
Eligible electors / turnout		25,175	30.51%	0.92%
Progressive Conservative hold		Swing		-8.55%
Source(s) Source: The Report on the March 3, 2008 Provincial General Election of the Twenty-seventh Legislative Assembly (PDF). Elections Alberta. July 28, 2008. pp. 234–237.

2012 Alberta general election: Calgary-Greenway
Party	Candidate	Votes	%
Progressive Conservative	Manmeet Bhullar	6,538	54.08
Wildrose	Ron Leech	3,893	32.21
Liberal	Iqtidar Awan	1,249	10.33
New Democratic	Al Brown	409	3.38
Total valid votes		12,090	100.00
Total rejected, unmarked and declined ballots		161	1.31
Turnout		12,251	45.68
Eligible voters		26,817	
Progressive Conservative pickup new district.			

2015 Alberta general election: Calgary-Greenway
Party	Candidate	Votes	%
Progressive Conservative	Manmeet Bhullar	5,337	43.0
New Democratic	Don Monroe	4,513	36.2
Wildrose	Devinder Toor	2,627	21.1
Total valid votes		12,477	100.0
Rejected, spoiled and declined		146	
Turnout		12,623	41.3
Eligible voters		30,600	
Source: Elections Alberta
