= Edmonton-Sherwood Park (provincial electoral district) =

Defunct provincial electoral district in Alberta, Canada

Coordinates: 53.56°N 113.49°W

Alberta electoral district

Defunct provincial electoral district
- Legislature: Legislative Assembly of Alberta
- District created: 1979
- District abolished: 1986
- First contested: 1979
- Last contested: 1982

Edmonton-Sherwood Park was a provincial electoral district in Alberta, Canada, mandated to return a single member to the Legislative Assembly of Alberta using the first past the post method of voting from 1979 to 1986.

== History ==
The electoral district was split in 1986 between Edmonton-Gold Bar and Sherwood Park.

=== Members of the Legislative Assembly (MLAs) ===
Members of the Legislative Assembly for Edmonton North East
Assembly	Years	Member	Party
See Edmonton-Ottewell electoral district from 1971-1979
18th	1979–1982	Henry Woo	Progressive Conservative
19th	1982–1986	Henry Woo	Progressive Conservative
See Edmonton-Gold Bar electoral district from 1986-Present and Sherwood Park electoral district from 1986-Present

== Election results ==
=== 1979 ===
1979 Alberta general election
Party	Candidate	Votes	%	±%
Progressive Conservative	Henry Woo	6,285	60.69%	–
New Democratic	Jim Denholm	1,682	16.24%	–
Social Credit	Oran Johnson	1,594	15.39%	–
Liberal	Stephen Lindop	795	7.68%	–
Total		10,356	–	–
Rejected, spoiled and declined		21	–	–
Eligible electors / turnout		17,572	59.05%	–
Progressive Conservative pickup new district.				
Source(s) Source: "Edmonton-Sherwood Park Official Results 1979 Alberta general election". Alberta Heritage Community Foundation.

=== 1982 ===
1982 Alberta general election
Party	Candidate	Votes	%	±%
Progressive Conservative	Henry Woo	8,401	54.76%	-5.93%
New Democratic	Ted Paszek	3,462	22.57%	6.32%
Western Canada Concept	Al Oeming	3,029	19.74%	–
Reform	Al Howell	450	2.93%	–
Total		15,342	–	–
Rejected, spoiled and declined		16	–	–
Eligible electors / turnout		20,400	75.28%	16.23%
Progressive Conservative hold		Swing		-6.13%
Source(s) Source: "Edmonton-Sherwood Park Official Results 1982 Alberta general election". Alberta Heritage Community Foundation.

== See also ==
- List of Alberta provincial electoral districts
- Canadian provincial electoral districts
