= Michael Code =

Canadian judge

The Honourable Mr. Justice Michael Code

Personal details
- Citizenship: Canada

Michael Code is a Canadian judge. He sits on the Ontario Superior Court of Justice and is based in Toronto. He is also a visiting faculty member at the University of Toronto Faculty of Law, and was formerly a full-time professor there.

He presided over the trial of Dellen Millard and Mark Smich for the murder of Laura Babcock.

In 2008, Code and former judge Patrick J. LeSage were appointed by the Ontario government to conduct a review of large and complex criminal case procedures. They presented their report to the province's Attorney General in November 2008. The LeSage-Code Report led to the enactment of the Fair and Efficient Criminal Trials Act in June 2011.
