= Don Valley North (federal electoral district) =

Federal electoral district in Ontario, Canada

Coordinates: 43.789°N 79.359°W

Ontario electoral district
- Interactive map of riding boundaries from the 2025 federal election

Federal electoral district
- Legislature: House of Commons
MP
Maggie Chi
Liberal
- District created: 1987
- First contested: 1988
- Last contested: 2025
- District webpage: profile, map

Demographics
- Population (2011): 113,663
- Electors (2015): 71,081
- Census division: Toronto
- Census subdivision: Toronto (part)

Don Valley North (French: Don Valley-Nord) is a federal electoral district in Toronto, Ontario, Canada. It has been represented in the House of Commons of Canada from 1988 to 1997 and since 2015. Don Valley North covers the area of the City of Toronto bounded by Steeles Avenue East to the north, Highway 401 to the south, Bayview Avenue to the west, and Victoria Park Avenue to the east.

Former North York city council member Barbara Greene, a Progressive Conservative, was elected as its first Member of Parliament in the 1988 election. She was defeated by Liberal Sarkis Assadourian in the 1993 election.

This riding was originally created in 1987, and was first used in the federal election of 1988. It was created from parts of Don Valley East and York—Scarborough ridings. In 1996, the riding was abolished through redistribution, and divided between Don Valley East and Willowdale ridings. This riding was re-created from parts of Willowdale and Don Valley East during the 2012 electoral redistribution.

As per the 2016 Census, Don Valley North is one of the only three City of Toronto ridings where Chinese is both the most frequent ethnic origin (32.4% of the population) and most frequent ethnicity group (31.3%, while White/Europeans come second with 29.3% of the population).

== Geography ==
This riding is located in the northeastern part of the North York district in Toronto. It contains the neighbourhoods of Henry Farm, Bayview Village, Bayview Woods-Steeles, Hillcrest Village, Don Valley Village, and Pleasant View.

== Demographics ==
According to the 2021 Canadian census

Languages: 31.2% English, 14.2% Mandarin, 8.6% Cantonese, 5.5% Persian, 3.2% Korean, 2.5% Tagalog, 2.2% Arabic, 2.0% Spanish, 1.4% Russian, 1.3% Hindi, 1.2% Romanian, 1.1% Tamil, 1.1% Armenian

Religions: 40.1% Christian (16.4% Catholic, 5.4% Christian Orthodox, 1.5% Anglican, 1.4% Presbyterian, 1.3% Baptist, 14.1% Other), 11.6% Muslim, 6.7% Hindu, 2.9% Jewish, 2.6% Buddhist, 34.2% None

Median income: $36,800 (2020)

Average income: $50,880 (2020)

Panethnic groups in Don Valley North (2011−2021)
Panethnic group	2021		2016		2011	
Panethnic group	Pop.	%	Pop.	%	Pop.	%
East Asian (Note: Statistic includes total responses of "Chinese", "Korean", and "Japanese" under visible minority section on census.)	37,885	33.65%	39,230	35.97%	36,710	36.02%
European (Note: Statistic includes all persons that did not make up part of a visible minority or an indigenous identity.)	28,340	25.17%	32,035	29.37%	33,290	32.67%
South Asian	15,560	13.82%	11,115	10.19%	9,850	9.67%
Middle Eastern (Note: Statistic includes total responses of "West Asian" and "Arab" under visible minority section on census.)	11,745	10.43%	11,050	10.13%	8,415	8.26%
Southeast Asian (Note: Statistic includes total responses of "Filipino" and "Southeast Asian" under visible minority section on census.)	7,040	6.25%	6,115	5.61%	5,185	5.09%
African	5,720	5.08%	4,735	4.34%	4,750	4.66%
Latin American	2,485	2.21%	1,850	1.7%	1,210	1.19%
Indigenous	375	0.33%	275	0.25%	320	0.31%
Other/multiracial (Note: Statistic includes total responses of "Visible minority, n.i.e." and "Multiple visible minorities" under visible minority section on census.)	3,430	3.05%	2,640	2.42%	2,170	2.13%
Total responses	112,590	99.06%	109,060	99.08%	101,905	98.87%
Total population	113,663	100%	110,076	100%	103,073	100%
Notes: Totals greater than 100% due to multiple origin responses. Demographics based on 2012 Canadian federal electoral redistribution riding boundaries.

== Members of Parliament ==
The riding has elected the following members of Parliament:

Parliament	Years	Member	Party
Don Valley North; Riding created from Don Valley East and York—Scarborough
34th	1988–1993	Barbara Greene	Progressive Conservative
35th	1993–1997	Sarkis Assadourian	Liberal
Riding dissolved into Don Valley East and Willowdale
Riding re-created from Willowdale and Don Valley East
42nd	2015–2019	Geng Tan	Liberal
43rd	2019–2021	Han Dong	Liberal
44th	2021–2023	Han Dong	Liberal
44th	2023–2025	Han Dong	Independent
45th	2025–present	Maggie Chi	Liberal

== Election results ==
View source data.
Graph of general election results in Don Valley North (since 2011 (rd), minor parties that never got 2% of the vote or didn't run consistently are omitted)

=== 2015–present ===
2025 Canadian federal election
Party	Candidate	Votes	%	±%	Expenditures
Liberal	Maggie Chi	25,822	53.22	+0.45	
Conservative	Joe Tay	20,546	42.34	+9.80	
New Democratic	Naila Saeed	1,191	2.45	–7.47	
Green	Andrew Armstrong	448	0.92	–0.89	
No affiliation	Xiaohua Gong	260	0.54	N/A	
People's	Ivan Milivojevic	260	0.54	–2.41	
Total valid votes/expense limit					
Total rejected ballots					
Turnout		48,531	62.63		
Eligible voters		77,486			
Liberal hold		Swing		–4.68	
Source: Elections Canada

2021 Canadian federal election
Party	Candidate	Votes	%	±%	Expenditures
Liberal	Han Dong	22,067	54.4	+4.0	$104,475.49
Conservative	Sabrina Zuniga	12,098	29.8	-5.6	$50,101.63
New Democratic	Bruce Griffin	4,304	10.6	+1.4	$6,816.76
People's	Jay Sobel	1,301	3.2	+2.2	$0.00
Green	Natalie Telfer	765	1.9	-2.0	$0.00
Total valid votes/expense limit		40,535	99.13	–	$108,188.62
Total rejected ballots		355	0.87		
Turnout		40,890	55.33		
Eligible voters		73,904			
Source: Elections Canada

2021 federal election redistributed results
Party	Vote	%
Liberal	22,186	52.77
Conservative	13,681	32.54
New Democratic	4,173	9.92
People's	1,240	2.95
Green	761	1.81
Others	5	0.01

2019 Canadian federal election
Party	Candidate	Votes	%	±%	Expenditures
Liberal	Han Dong	23,495	50.4	-1.02	$101,636.63
Conservative	Sarah Fischer	16,506	35.4	-2.42	$78,956.94
New Democratic	Bruce Griffin	4,285	9.2	+0.67	$16,277.89
Green	Daniel Giavedoni	1,803	3.9	+1.67	$1,834.80
People's	Jay Sobel	482	1.0	-	$1,499.08
Total valid votes/expense limit		46,571	100.0		
Total rejected ballots		314			
Turnout		46,885	62.0		
Eligible voters		75,566			
Liberal hold		Swing		+0.70	
Source: Elections Canada

2015 Canadian federal election
Party	Candidate	Votes	%	±%	Expenditures
Liberal	Geng Tan	23,494	51.42	+14.13	$89,171.01
Conservative	Joe Daniel	17,279	37.82	-2.47	$70,723.13
New Democratic	Akil Sadikali	3,896	8.53	-12.20	$16,603.42
Green	Caroline Brown	1,018	2.23	+0.91	–
Total valid votes/expense limit		45,687	100.00		$205,015.85
Total rejected ballots		259	0.56	–	
Turnout		45,946	63.12	–	
Eligible voters		72,787			
Liberal gain from Conservative		Swing		+8.30	
Source: Elections Canada

2011 federal election redistributed results
Party	Vote	%
Conservative	15,801	40.30
Liberal	14,625	37.30
New Democratic	8,129	20.73
Green	516	1.32
Others	142	0.36

=== 1988–1993 ===
View source data.
Graph of general election results in Don Valley North (1987-1996, minor parties that never got 2% of the vote or didn't run consistently are omitted)

1993 Canadian federal election
Party	Candidate	Votes	%	±%
Liberal	Sarkis Assadourian	22,504	59.86	+17.93
Progressive Conservative	Barbara Greene	7,238	19.25	–24.18
Reform	Peter Cobbold	6,068	16.14	
New Democratic	David Lu	1,395	3.71	–8.11
Natural Law	William J. Sparling	319	0.85	
Abolitionist	Lindsay George King	69	0.18	
Total valid votes		37,593	100.0	
Liberal gain from Progressive Conservative		Swing		+21.06

1988 Canadian federal election
Party	Candidate	Votes	%
Progressive Conservative	Barbara Greene	17,551	43.43
Liberal	Sarkis Assadourian	16,947	41.94
New Democratic	Anton Kuerti	4,777	11.82
Independent	Bernadette Michael	577	1.43
Libertarian	Earl Epsteine	560	1.39
Total valid votes		40,412	100.0

== See also ==
- List of Canadian electoral districts
- Historical federal electoral districts of Canada
