= Anton Kuerti =

Canadian pianist, composer, and conductor

Anton Emil Kuerti, OC (born July 21, 1938) is an Austrian-born Canadian pianist, music teacher, composer, and conductor. He has developed international recognition as a solo pianist.

== Early life ==
Kuerti was born in Vienna, Austria. As a child, he immigrated to the United States and studied piano under Edward Goldman in Boston. Kuerti performed the Grieg Piano Concerto with the Boston Pops Orchestra at age eleven. Kuerti studied music at the Longy School of Music, at the Cleveland Institute of Music where he earned a Bachelor of Music degree, and at the Curtis Institute. His teachers included Arthur Loesser, Rudolf Serkin and Mieczysław Horszowski. He also studied at the age of 16 at The Peabody Conservatory, Baltimore, with Henry Cowell; he later wrote an article, "Henry Cowell: Enfant Terrible of American Music", for the fall 1995 issue of Queen's Quarterly.

He won the Leventritt Award in 1957.

== Career ==
Kuerti moved to Canada in 1965. He later joined the music faculty at the University of Toronto. One of his pupils at the university was pianist Jane Coop.

Kuerti has toured extensively as a solo performer, performing in 150 communities throughout Canada and with every professional Canadian orchestra and many in the US and elsewhere. He has also recorded many albums. His recordings include all the Beethoven concertos and sonatas, the Schubert sonatas, the Brahms concertos, and works by many other composers. He won the 1976 Juno Award for best classical recording for his album The Beethoven Sonatas, Volumes 1, 2 and 3, and has been nominated 7 times.

Kuerti has received nine honorary degrees: Hon. Doc. (hon) York University 1985; Laurentian University 1985; Cleveland Institute of Music 1996; Memorial University 2001; Dalhousie University 2002; McGill University 2004; Wilfrid Laurier University 2005; The University of Western Ontario 2007; Brandon University 2012. In 1980, he founded the Festival of the Sound, a classical music festival in Parry Sound, Ontario.

In 1998, he was appointed an Officer of the Order of Canada. In 2007 he was appointed to the special one-year Schulich Professorship at the Schulich School of Music at McGill University in Montreal as visiting professor. In 2008 Kuerti received the Governor General's Performing Arts Award for Lifetime Artistic Achievement, Canada's highest honour in the performing arts.

Kuerti is the artistic director emeritus of Mooredale Concerts, and of the Mooredale Youth Orchestras, a small Toronto-based set of three orchestras for children and teen-agers founded by his late wife, cellist Kristine Bogyo.

In 2002, Kuerti directed The Czerny Music Festival in Edmonton, to showcase the work of Austrian composer Carl Czerny (1791–1857). The festival featured symphonies, masses, string quartets and quintets, works for piano and strings, songs and miscellaneous chamber works, composed by Czerny.

On October 17, 2013, Kuerti was overcome by a stroke while playing a concert in Miami. He continues to recover.

== Political views ==
A longtime peace activist, Kuerti signed a tax resistance vow in 1966 to protest the Vietnam War and was registered as a conscientious objector. He was also the New Democratic Party candidate in Don Valley North in the 1988 federal election.

Kuerti, who is Jewish, went on record condemning Israel's invasion of Gaza in 2009.

== Honours ==
In 2016, he was made a member of the Order of Ontario. Kuerti has also received National Music League Award 1956; Philadelphia Orchestra Youth Prize, 1957; Leventritt Award 1957; Toronto Arts Award, 1997; Opus Award, Quebec 1998; The Banff Centre National Arts Award 2007; Robert Schumann Prize of the City of Zwickau, Germany 2007; Queen Elizabeth II Diamond Jubilee Medal 2012.

== Electoral record ==
1988 Canadian federal election: Don Valley North (federal electoral district)
Party	Candidate	Votes	%
Progressive Conservative	Barbara Greene	17,551	43.43
Liberal	Sarkis Assadourian	16,947	41.94
New Democratic	Anton Kuerti	4,777	11.82
Independent	Bernadette Michael	577	1.43
Libertarian	Earl Epsteine	560	1.39
Total valid votes		40,412	100.0
