= Jamaal Myers =

Jamaican-Canadian lawyer and politician

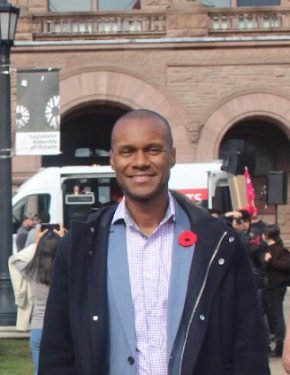

Toronto City Councillor for Ward 23 Scarborough North
- In office November 15, 2022 – November 15, 2026
- Preceded by: Cynthia Lai
- Succeeded by: Shaun Chen

Chair of the Toronto Transit Commission
- In office August 11, 2023 – November 15, 2026
- Mayor: Olivia Chow
- Preceded by: Jon Burnside
- Succeeded by: Paul Ainslie

Personal details
- Born: Jamaal Michael Anthony Myers; 1982 or 1983 (age 43–44) Scarborough, Ontario, Canada
- Education: University of Western Ontario (BA); London School of Economics (MSc); New York University (JD)
- Occupation: Politician; lawyer
- Website: www.jamaalmyers.com

Jamaal Michael Anthony Myers (born 1982 or 1983) is a Canadian politician who represented Ward 23 Scarborough North on Toronto City Council from 2022 to 2026. He served as chair of the Toronto Transit Commission from August 11, 2023, to November 15, 2026. Before entering politics, he worked as a corporate lawyer.

== Early life and education ==
Jamaal Michael Anthony Myers was born in 1982 or 1983 in Scarborough to Jamaican parents and raised in Toronto Community Housing.

He attended the University of Western Ontario, graduating in 2006 with a bachelor's in political science, before completing a master's in comparative politics and research methodology at the London School of Economics in 2007. Myers earned a Juris Doctor degree from the New York University School of Law in 2013.

== Career ==
Myers was previously employed at TD Bank and was promoted to senior legal counsel in 2020, with his work focusing on environmental, social and corporate governance (ESG).

He served as vice-chair of TAIBU Community Health Center and director of the Scarborough Business Association. Moreover, he was a volunteer with HousingNowTO and Scarborough Transit Action.

== Political career ==
Myers was elected to Toronto City Council during the 2022 Toronto municipal election, replacing the late incumbent Cynthia Lai who died days before the municipal election on October 21, 2022. Due to her death, Lai's votes were not counted.

Myers ran on a platform of affordable housing, easier access to healthcare, increased funding and more buses for the Toronto Transit Commission (TTC) in wake of the Line 3 Scarborough closure, as well as maintaining the ActiveTO program. He was endorsed by the Toronto Star, Toronto & York Region Labour Council, and Progress Toronto.

Myers began his first term on council by releasing a statement alongside other councillors opposing the Better Municipal Governance Act, 2022, which is a controversial provincial legislation which would give the mayors of Toronto and Ottawa the power to pass local bylaws with only a third of city council’s support.

Myers was appointed as chair of the Toronto Transit Commission (TTC) Board on August 11, 2023, by Mayor Olivia Chow, and served until November 15, 2026. In the 2026 Toronto municipal election, he was defeated in his bid for re-election by former Member of Parliament Shaun Chen.

== Electoral history ==
2026 Toronto municipal election, Ward 23 Scarborough North
Candidate	Votes	%
Shaun Chen	9,828	35.88
Jamaal Myers	6,943	25.34
Han Dong	3,676	13.42
Kevin Li	3,649	13.32
Piravena Sathiyanantham	2,708	9.89
Sajawal Javed	292	1.07
John-Mark Oleh	202	0.74
Ronald Phen	96	0.35
Source: City of Toronto

2022 Toronto municipal election, Ward 23 Scarborough North
Candidate	Vote	%
Jamaal Myers	5,315	51.09
Phillip Francis	2,755	26.48
Virginia Jones	2,333	22.43
Cynthia Lai (Note: Lai died on October 21, 2022. As the ballots were already printed prior to her death, she still appeared on the ballot, however did not get any votes.)	0	0.00
Total	10,403	100%
Source: City of Toronto
