= Ward 23 Scarborough North =

Municipal council district in Toronto, Ontario, Canada

Coordinates: 43.81°N 79.26°W

- Constituency for the Toronto City Council
- Location of Ward 23 in Toronto
- City: Toronto
- Population: 111,560 (2021)

Current constituency
- Created: 2018
- Councillor: Shaun Chen
- First contested: 2018 election
- Last contested: 2026 election
- Ward profile: City of Toronto Ward Profile

Ward 23 Scarborough North is a municipal electoral division in Toronto, Ontario, Canada, for the Toronto City Council. It was last contested in the 2026 municipal election, with Shaun Chen elected councillor.

== Boundaries ==
On August 14, 2018, the Government of Ontario redrew municipal boundaries via the Better Local Government Act, 2018, S.O. 2018, c. 11 - Bill 5. This means that the 25 provincial electoral districts and the 25 municipal wards in Toronto currently share the same geographic borders.

Defined in legislation as:

Consisting of that part of the City of Toronto described as follows: commencing at the intersection of the northerly limit of said city with the Rouge River; thence generally southerly along said river to the electric power transmission line; thence westerly along said transmission line to Morningside Avenue; thence southerly along said avenue to Neilson Road; thence generally southerly along said road to Highway No. 401; thence westerly along said highway to Midland Avenue; thence northerly along said avenue to the northerly limit of said city; thence easterly along said limit to the point of commencement.

== History ==
=== 2018 boundary adjustment ===
Toronto municipal ward boundaries were significantly modified in 2018 during the election campaign. Ultimately the new ward structure was used and later upheld by the Supreme Court of Canada in 2021.

== Councillors ==
Council term	Member
2018–2022	Cynthia Lai
2022–2026	Jamaal Myers
2026–2030	Shaun Chen

== Election results ==
2026 Toronto municipal election

Candidate	Votes	%	minus
Shaun Chen	9,828	35.88	–
Jamaal Myers (X)	6,943	25.34	25.75 ▼
Han Dong	3,676	13.42	–
Kevin Li	3,649	13.32	–
Piravena Sathiyanantham	2,708	9.89	–
Sajawal Javed	292	1.07	–
John-Mark Oleh	202	0.74	–
Ronald Phen	96	0.35	–

2022 Toronto municipal election

Candidate	Vote	%
Jamaal Myers	5,315	51.09
Phillip Francis	2,755	26.48
Virginia Jones	2,333	22.43

2018 Toronto municipal election

Candidate	Votes	Percentage
Cynthia Lai	5,589	27.02%
Maggie Chi	4,137	20.00%
Felicia Samuel	3,702	17.89%
Neethan Saba	2,808	13.57%
James Chow	1,487	7.19%
Ashwani Bhardwaj	1,259	6.09%
Sheraz Khan	453	2.19%
Dameon Halstead	391	1.89%
Mahboob Mian	335	1.62%
Sandeep Srivastava	273	1.32%
Anthony Internicola	254	1.23%

== See also ==
- Municipal elections in Canada
- Municipal government of Toronto
- List of Toronto municipal elections
