= Don Valley East (federal electoral district) =

Defunct federal electoral district in Ontario, Canada

Coordinates: 43.74°N 79.33°W

Ontario electoral district
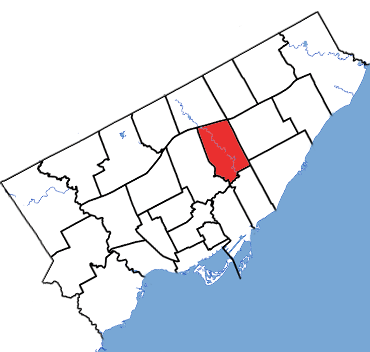
- Don Valley East in relation to other electoral districts in Toronto (2013 boundaries)

Defunct federal electoral district
- Legislature: House of Commons
- District created: 1976
- District abolished: 2023
- First contested: 1979
- Last contested: 2021
- District webpage: profile, map

Demographics
- Population (2021): 95,039
- Electors (2019): 65,793
- Area (km²): 24
- Census division: Toronto
- Census subdivision: Toronto

Don Valley East (French: Don Valley-Est) is a former federal electoral district in Ontario, Canada that covers the northeast section of the North York part of Toronto. The federal riding was created in 1976 from parts of Willowdale, York East, York North, and York—Scarborough ridings.

It was last represented in the House of Commons of Canada in 2025 by Liberal MP Michael Coteau. He was formerly the Ontario Liberal MPP for the contiguous provincial riding.

== Geography ==
This riding is located in the eastern part of the North York district in Toronto. It contains the neighbourhoods of Flemingdon Park, Don Mills, Graydon Hall, Parkwoods and Victoria Village.

== History ==
For most of its existence, this riding has alternated between voting Liberal and Conservative. During the Brian Mulroney years, it elected Progressive Conservatives but it switched to Liberal when Jean Chrétien came to power. In 2011, when Stephen Harper's Conservative Party won a majority government, the riding switched back to Conservative.

=== Robocall controversy ===
Don Valley East was one of the seven federal ridings for which the election results were being challenged in court because of automated phone calls ("robocalls") that voters say tried to misdirect them to wrong polling stations. According to the challenger's claims, phone calls claiming to be on behalf of Elections Canada directed some voters to the wrong polling station during the election. It is illegal under the Elections Act to impersonate Elections Canada and to interfere with somebody's right to vote.

In October 2012, however, Don Valley East was dropped from the legal case after it was found that Leeanne Bielli, the voter who brought the challenge forward, did not live in the riding. Bielli therefore became ineligible to challenge the result. Joe Daniel remained the Member of Parliament for Don Valley East until the 2015 federal election.

=== Boundaries ===
As of changes made in 2003, the riding boundaries consisted of:

- on the east by Victoria Park Avenue,
- on the north by the hydroelectric transmission line situated north of Apache Trail running west from Victoria Park Avenue to Highway No. 404, then along that highway to Finch Avenue East, and west along Finch Avenue to Leslie Street;
- on the west by Leslie Street as far as the Canadian National Railway, then by the railway to Don Mills Road, then south along Don Mills Road to the Canadian Pacific Railway, then northeast along the railway to the Don River East Branch, and south along the Don River to just west of Sunrise Avenue, and
- on the south by Sunrise Avenue.

This riding underwent significant changes during the 2012 electoral redistribution. It lost almost half of its territory to Don Valley North and gained a significant portion of Don Valley West.

=== Former boundaries ===
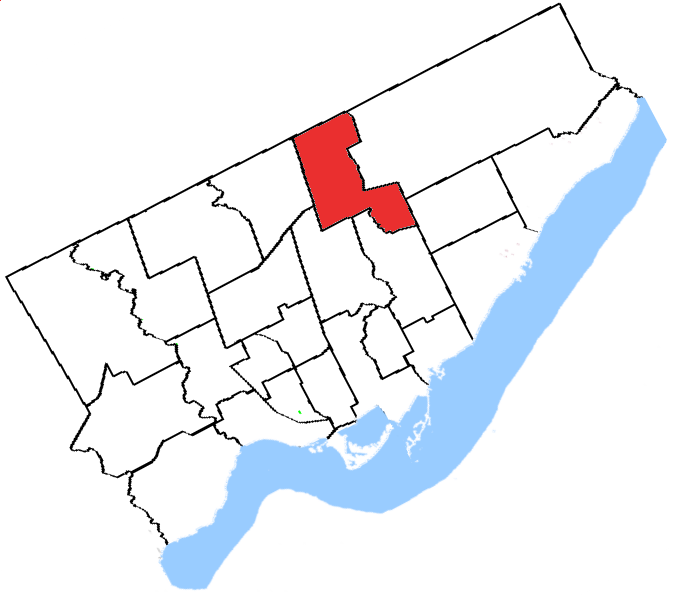
1976 to 1987

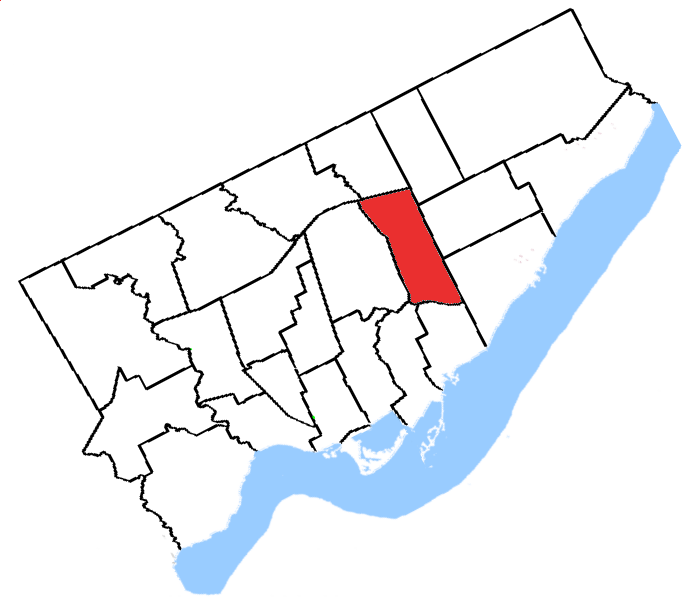
1987 to 1996

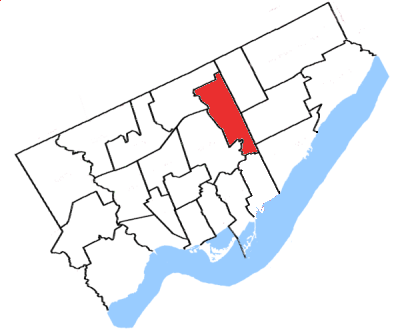
1996 to 2003

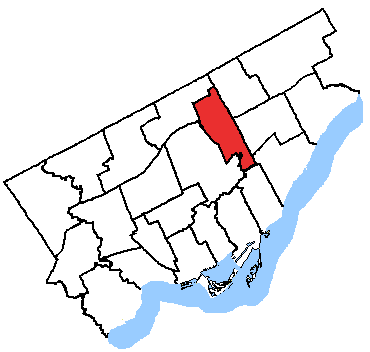
2003 to 2015

== Demographics ==
According to the 2021 Canadian census

Languages: 44.0% English, 3.6% Tagalog, 3.5% Arabic, 3.1% Mandarin, 2.7% Urdu, 2.3% Spanish, 2.2% Cantonese, 2.1% Greek, 2.0% Dari, 2.0% Gujarati, 1.6% Persian, 1.3% Romanian, 1.2% Tamil, 1.2% Bengali, 1.1% Hindi, 1.0% Korean

Religions: 47.9% Christian (19.9% Catholic, 7.7% Christian Orthodox, 2.4% Anglican, 2.0% United Church, 1.2% Presbyterian, 1.1% Pentecostal, 13.6% Other), 22.3% Muslim, 4.5% Hindu, 1.2% Buddhist, 22.1% None

Median income: $36,400 (2020)

Average income: $50,680 (2020)

Panethnic groups in Don Valley East (2011−2021)
Panethnic group	2021		2016		2011	
Panethnic group	Pop.	%	Pop.	%	Pop.	%
European (Note: Statistic includes all persons that did not make up part of a visible minority or an indigenous identity.)	34,255	36.31%	38,125	40.92%	39,930	43.31%
South Asian	17,285	18.32%	15,890	17.05%	15,140	16.42%
African	9,880	10.47%	8,665	9.3%	8,390	9.1%
East Asian (Note: Statistic includes total responses of "Chinese", "Korean", and "Japanese" under visible minority section on census.)	9,280	9.84%	8,880	9.53%	9,520	10.32%
Middle Eastern (Note: Statistic includes total responses of "West Asian" and "Arab" under visible minority section on census.)	9,120	9.67%	8,480	9.1%	7,555	8.19%
Southeast Asian (Note: Statistic includes total responses of "Filipino" and "Southeast Asian" under visible minority section on census.)	7,985	8.46%	7,510	8.06%	6,510	7.06%
Latin American	2,290	2.43%	2,195	2.36%	2,200	2.39%
Indigenous	555	0.59%	660	0.71%	735	0.8%
Other/multiracial (Note: Statistic includes total responses of "Visible minority, n.i.e." and "Multiple visible minorities" under visible minority section on census.)	3,695	3.92%	2,760	2.96%	2,225	2.41%
Total responses	94,335	99.26%	93,170	98.51%	92,205	99.14%
Total population	95,039	100%	94,579	100%	93,007	100%
Notes: Totals greater than 100% due to multiple origin responses. Demographics based on 2012 Canadian federal electoral redistribution riding boundaries.

== Members of Parliament ==
This riding has elected the following members of Parliament:

Parliament	Years	Member	Party
Don Valley East; Riding created from Willowdale, York East, York North and York—Scarborough
31st	1979–1980	Sam Wakim	Progressive Conservative
32nd	1980–1984	David Smith	Liberal
33rd	1984–1988	Bill Attewell	Progressive Conservative
34th	1988–1993	Alan Redway	Progressive Conservative
35th	1993–1997	David Collenette	Liberal
36th	1997–2000	David Collenette	Liberal
37th	2000–2004	David Collenette	Liberal
38th	2004–2006	Yasmin Ratansi	Liberal
39th	2006–2008	Yasmin Ratansi	Liberal
40th	2008–2011	Yasmin Ratansi	Liberal
41st	2011–2015	Joe Daniel	Conservative
42nd	2015–2019	Yasmin Ratansi	Liberal
43rd	2019–2020	Yasmin Ratansi	Liberal
43rd	2020–2021	Yasmin Ratansi	Independent
44th	2021–2025	Michael Coteau	Liberal
Riding dissolved into Don Valley North, Don Valley West, and Scarborough Centre—Don Valley East

== Election results ==
View source data.
Graph of general election results in Don Valley East (1979–, minor parties that never got 2% of the vote or didn't run consistently are omitted)

2021 Canadian federal election
Party	Candidate	Votes	%	±%	Expenditures
Liberal	Michael Coteau	22,356	59.90	+0.09	$90,078.21
Conservative	Penelope Williams	8,766	23.49	–0.43	$39,800.25
New Democratic	Simon Topp	4,618	12.37	+1.38	$10,191.25
People's	Peter De Marco	1,585	4.25	+2.92	none listed
Total valid votes/expense limit		37,325	100.00	–	$104,140.64
Total rejected ballots		470	1.24	+0.22	
Turnout		37,795	59.12	–5.11	
Eligible voters		63,934			
Liberal hold		Swing		+0.26	
Source: Elections Canada

2019 Canadian federal election
Party	Candidate	Votes	%	±%	Expenditures
Liberal	Yasmin Ratansi	25,295	59.81	+1.98	$74,656.45
Conservative	Michael Ma	10,115	23.92	-5.31	$66,318.23
New Democratic	Nicholas Thompson	4,647	10.99	+0.63	none listed
Green	Dan Turcotte	1,675	3.96	+1.37	$3,743.20
People's	John P. Hendry	562	1.33	-	none listed
Total valid votes/expense limit		42,294	99.98		
Total rejected ballots		438	1.02	+0.41	
Turnout		42,732	64.23	-1.31	
Eligible voters		66,530			
Liberal hold		Swing		+3.65	
Source: Elections Canada

2015 Canadian federal election
Party	Candidate	Votes	%	±%	Expenditures
Liberal	Yasmin Ratansi	24,048	57.82	+19.43	$109,579.16
Conservative	Maureen Harquail	12,155	29.23	-7.16	$127,111.51
New Democratic	Khalid Ahmed	4,307	10.36	-11.52	$9,377.74
Green	Laura Elizabeth Sanderson	1,078	2.59	-0.21	–
Total valid votes/expense limit		41,588	99.39		$197,799.11
Total rejected ballots		257	0.61		
Turnout		41,845	65.54		
Eligible voters		63,845			
Liberal gain from Conservative		Swing		+13.30	
Source: Elections Canada

2011 federal election redistributed results
Party	Vote	%
Liberal	13,503	38.39
Conservative	12,794	36.38
New Democratic	7,694	21.88
Green	994	2.83
Others	187	0.53

=== 2003 boundaries ===
2011 Canadian federal election
Party	Candidate	Votes	%	±%	Expenditures
Conservative	Joe Daniel	14,422	36.78	+5.78	
Liberal	Yasmin Ratansi	13,552	34.56	-13.51	
New Democratic	Mary Trapani Hynes	9,878	25.19	+11.87	
Green	Akil Sadikali	1,114	2.84	-4.05	
Christian Heritage	Ryan Kidd	246	0.63	-0.07	
Total valid votes		39,212	100.00		
Total rejected ballots		218	0.55	–	
Turnout		39,430	57.24	–	
Eligible voters		68,890	–	–	

2008 Canadian federal election
Party	Candidate	Votes	%	±%	Expenditures
Liberal	Yasmin Ratansi	18,264	48.07	-5.92	$67,602
Conservative	Eugene McDermott	11,777	31.00	+1.84	$77,618
New Democratic	Mary Trapani Hynes	5,062	13.32	+0.43	$5,282
Green	Wayne Clements	2,618	6.89	+2.95	$4,032
Christian Heritage	Alex Kovalenko	266	0.70	–	$163
Total valid votes/expense limit		37,987	100.00		$81,387
Liberal hold		Swing	-3.88		

2006 Canadian federal election
Party	Candidate	Votes	%	±%
Liberal	Yasmin Ratansi	23,441	53.99	-0.6
Conservative	Eugene McDermott	12,661	29.16	+1.2
New Democratic	Richard Alan Hennick	5,597	12.89	-0.3
Green	Wayne Clements	1,714	3.94	+1.0
Total valid votes		43,413	100.00	

2004 Canadian federal election
Party	Candidate	Votes	%	±%
Liberal	Yasmin Ratansi	21,864	54.6	-12.0
Conservative	David Johnson	11,206	28.0	+7.7
New Democratic	Valerie Ann Mah	5,287	13.2	+7.4
Green	Dan King	1,172	2.9	
Christian Heritage	Ryan Kidd	351	0.8	+0.3
Communist	Christopher Black	149	0.4	
Total valid votes		40,029	100.0	

Note: Conservative vote is compared to the total of the Canadian Alliance vote and Progressive Conservative vote in 2000 election.

=== 1996 boundaries ===
2000 Canadian federal election
Party	Candidate	Votes	%	±%
Liberal	David Collenette	25,915	66.6	+11.5
Progressive Conservative	Cecila Fusco	5,645	14.5	-7.6
Alliance	Kasra Nejatian	4,736	12.2	-1.1
New Democratic	Ron Casey Nestor	2,249	5.8	-1.9
Independent	Ryan Kidd	212	0.5	
Marxist–Leninist	Judith Snow	153	0.4	
Total valid votes		38,910	100.0	

Note: Canadian Alliance vote is compared to the Reform vote in 1997 election.

1997 Canadian federal election
Party	Candidate	Votes	%	±%
Liberal	David Collenette	21,511	55.1	+1.0
Progressive Conservative	Denzil Minnan-Wong	8,610	22.1	-1.3
Reform	John Pope	5,167	13.2	-4.1
New Democratic	Shodja Ziaian	2,981	7.6	+3.8
Canadian Action	Joe Braini	384	1.0	
Natural Law	Mark Roy	192	0.5	0.0
Independent	Mariam Abou-Dib	170	0.4	
Total valid votes		39,015	100.0	

=== 1987 boundaries ===
1993 Canadian federal election
Party	Candidate	Votes	%	±%
Liberal	David Collenette	21,511	54.1	+16.2
Progressive Conservative	Alan Redway	9,279	23.3	-21.4
Reform	Gordon E. Honsey	6,877	17.3	
New Democratic	Janice Waud Loper	1,538	3.9	-11.2
Libertarian	Mark Meschino	238	0.6	-0.7
Natural Law	Fred Fredeen	205	0.5	
Marxist–Leninist	Roger Carter	90	0.2	
Abolitionist	Michael Mazerolle	22	0.1	
Total valid votes		39,760	100.0	

1988 Canadian federal election
Party	Candidate	Votes	%	±%
Progressive Conservative	Alan Redway	18,719	44.7	-9.7
Liberal	Yasmin Ratansi	15,881	37.9	+3.9
New Democratic	Brant Loper	6,310	15.1	+4.4
Libertarian	Mark Meschino	538	1.3	+0.6
Independent	David Smith	271	0.6	
Communist	Maria Kontopidis	155	0.4	
Total valid votes		41,874	100.0	

=== 1976 boundaries ===
1984 Canadian federal election
Party	Candidate	Votes	%	±%
Progressive Conservative	Bill Attewell	29,706	54.4	+11.4
Liberal	David Smith	18,578	34.0	-10.6
New Democratic	Joe Macdonald	5,842	10.7	-0.9
Libertarian	Robert Champlain	356	0.7	+0.1
Independent	Arthur V. Wright	162	0.3	+0.1
Total valid votes		54,644	100.0	

1980 Canadian federal election
Party	Candidate	Votes	%	±%
Liberal	David Smith	21,944	44.6	+4.8
Progressive Conservative	Sam Wakim	21,119	43.0	-4.2
New Democratic	Saul Paton	5,713	11.6	-0.7
Libertarian	Gordon Keys	286	0.6	0.0
Independent	Arthur V. Wright	98	0.2	
Total valid votes		49,160	100.0	
lop.parl.ca

1979 Canadian federal election
Party	Candidate	Votes	%
Progressive Conservative	Sam Wakim	25,352	47.2
Liberal	Mike Smith	21,428	39.9
New Democratic	Saul Paton	6,595	12.3
Libertarian	Nick Moldovanyi	301	0.6
Marxist–Leninist	Donna Gordon	56	0.1
Total valid votes		53,732	100.0

== See also ==
- List of Canadian electoral districts
- Historical federal electoral districts of Canada
