= Shaun Chen (politician) =

Canadian politician

- 陳聖源
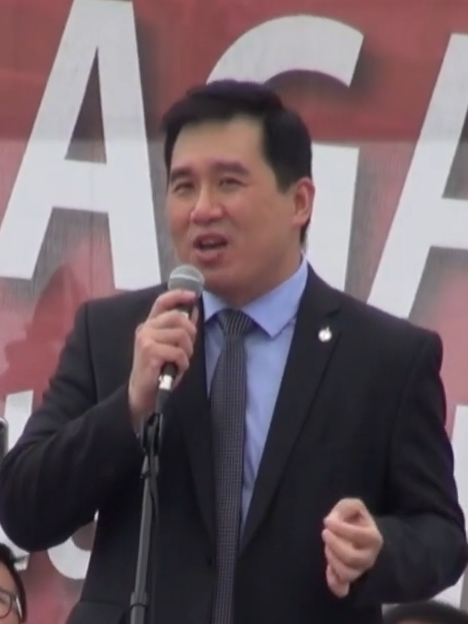
- Chen in 2023

Toronto City Councillor for Ward 23 Scarborough North
- Incumbent
- Assumed office November 15, 2026
- Preceded by: Jamaal Myers

Member of Parliament for Scarborough North
- In office October 19, 2015 – August 15, 2026
- Preceded by: Riding established
- Succeeded by: TBD

Chair of the Toronto District School Board
- In office December 1, 2014 – August 4, 2015
- Preceded by: Chris Bolton
- Succeeded by: Robin Pilkey

Toronto Public School Trustee for (Ward 21) Scarborough—Rouge River
- In office December 1, 2006 – October 28, 2015
- Preceded by: Noah Ng
- Succeeded by: Neethan Shan

Personal details
- Born: September 18, 1980 (age 46) Toronto, Ontario, Canada
- Party: Independent (Note: In Ontario, municipal politicians are elected on a non-partisan basis.)
- Other political affiliations: Liberal (federal)
- Education: University of Toronto

Shaun Chen (simplified Chinese: 陈圣源; traditional Chinese: 陳聖源; born September 18, 1980) is a Canadian politician who was elected to represent Ward 23 Scarborough North on Toronto City Council in 2026. Chen previously served as the member of Parliament (MP) for Scarborough North from 2015 to 2026 as a member of the Liberal Party. Before entering federal politics, Chen served as a Toronto District School Board trustee representing Ward 21 and as the board's chair.

== Early life ==
Shaun Chen was born September 18, 1980, in Toronto to Hakka Chinese parents from India. He was raised in Scarborough, Ontario, and attended Sir John A. Macdonald Collegiate Institute. He attended the University of Toronto, where he earned a Bachelor of Science in computer science and equity studies and a Master of Arts in sociology in education.

== Political career ==
=== School board (2006-2015) ===
In November 2006, Chen was elected a Toronto District School Board (TDSB) trustee representing Ward 21. He served as vice-chair of the TDSB from 2011 to 2014 before being elected chair in December 2014. He resigned as chair in August 2015 and took a leave of absence as trustee to run as a Liberal candidate in the newly established riding of Scarborough North.

=== Federal politics (2015–2026) ===
Chen was elected to the House of Commons of Canada in the 2015 federal election, defeating incumbent NDP candidate Rathika Sitsabaiesan in Scarborough North. He was re-elected in the 2019, 2021, and 2025 elections.

On December 8, 2022, Chen introduced Motion M-63 in the House of Commons, condemning racism and calling for a national review of anti-Asian hate crimes and incidents, which had increased during the COVID-19 pandemic. The private member's motion passed unanimously on June 14, 2023.

On August 10, 2026, Chen announced that he would resign from the House of Commons on August 15, citing health concerns related to a concussion he sustained in a car accident in October 2025. Chen said the injuries had prevented him from travelling to Ottawa as frequently as his parliamentary duties required.

=== Municipal politics (2026–present) ===
Following his resignation from the House of Commons, Chen announced his candidacy for city councillor for Ward 23 Scarborough North in the 2026 Toronto municipal election. He was elected to the position, defeating incumbent Jamaal Myers.

== Awards and recognition ==
In 2000, Chen was named one of "100 young Canadians to watch" by Maclean's magazine. He was awarded the Queen Elizabeth II Diamond Jubilee Medal and, in 2024, the King Charles III Coronation Medal.

== Electoral record ==
2026 Toronto municipal election, Ward 23 Scarborough North
Candidate	Votes	%
Shaun Chen	9,828	35.88
Jamaal Myers	6,943	25.34
Han Dong	3,676	13.42
Kevin Li	3,649	13.32
Piravena Sathiyanantham	2,708	9.89
Sajawal Javed	292	1.07
John-Mark Oleh	202	0.74
Ronald Phen	96	0.35
Source: City of Toronto

2025 Canadian federal election: Scarborough North
Party	Candidate	Votes	%	±%	Expenditures
Liberal	Shaun Chen	29,418	62.95	–4.03	
Conservative	Gurmit Sandhu	15,487	33.14	+15.05	
New Democratic	Karishma Manji	1,827	3.91	–7.68	
Total valid votes/expense limit		46,732			
Total rejected ballots		446			
Turnout		47,178	60.02		
Eligible voters		78,591			
Liberal notional hold		Swing		–9.54	
Source: Elections Canada

2021 Canadian federal election: Scarborough North
Party	Candidate	Votes	%	±%	Expenditures
Liberal	Shaun Chen	21,178	66.6	+13.0	$82,302.74
Conservative	Fazal Shah	5,999	18.9	-11.4	$17,653.09
New Democratic	Christina Love	3,514	11.0	-1.9	$26.24
People's	David Moore	763	2.4	+1.5	$18.24
Centrist	Sheraz Khan	361	1.1	N/A	$4,073.67
Total valid votes/expense limit		31,815	99.0	–	$103,970.89
Total rejected ballots		337	1.0		
Turnout		32,152	50.6		
Eligible voters		63,589			
Liberal hold		Swing		+12.2	
Source: Elections Canada

2019 Canadian federal election: Scarborough North
Party	Candidate	Votes	%	±%	Expenditures
Liberal	Shaun Chen	20,911	53.6	+5.36	$97,385.61
Conservative	David Kong	11,838	30.3	+2.90	$29,125.27
New Democratic	Yan Chen	5,039	12.9	-9.17	$32,079.36
Green	Avery Velez	796	2.0	+0.52	$0.00
People's	Jude Guerrier	370	0.9	-	$0.00
United	Janet Robinson	83	0.2	-	none listed
Total valid votes/expense limit		39,037	100.0		
Total rejected ballots		385			
Turnout		39,422	59.7		
Eligible voters		66,018			
Liberal hold		Swing		+2.46	
Source: Elections Canada

2015 Canadian federal election: Scarborough North
Party	Candidate	Votes	%	±%	Expenditures
Liberal	Shaun Chen	18,904	48.24	+19.37	$72,471.61
Conservative	Ravinder Malhi	10,737	27.40	-5.98	$101,170.06
New Democratic	Rathika Sitsabaiesan	8,648	22.07	-13.3	$135,280.61
Green	Eleni MacDonald	579	1.48	-0.14	$668.91
Independent	Raphael Rosch	164	0.42	–	$210.83
Independent	Aasia Khatoon	156	0.40	–	$1,724.47
Total valid votes/expense limit		39,188	100.0		$199,432.15
Total rejected ballots		216	–	–	
Turnout		39,404	60.87	–	
Eligible voters		64,827			
Liberal notional gain from New Democratic		Swing		+16.34	
Source: Elections Canada
