= Maggie Chi =

Canadian politician

Maggie Chi MP
- 迟月

Parliamentary Secretary to the Minister of Health
- Incumbent
- Assumed office June 5, 2025

Member of Parliament for Don Valley North
- Incumbent
- Assumed office April 28, 2025
- Preceded by: Han Dong

Personal details
- Born: 1988 or 1989 (age 37–38)
- Party: Liberal
- Website: maggiechi.liberal.ca

Chinese name
- Traditional Chinese: 遲月
- Simplified Chinese: 迟月
Transcriptions
Standard Mandarin
- Hanyu Pinyin: Chí Yuè
Yue: Cantonese
- Jyutping: Ci^{4} Jyut^{6}

Maggie Chi (Chinese: 迟月) is a Canadian politician who serves as the member of Parliament (MP) for Don Valley North. A member of the Liberal Party, Chi was elected in the 2025 Canadian federal election.

== Biography ==
Chi had served as constituency assistant to Toronto city councillors Chin Lee and Shelley Carroll. She ran for city councillor in Ward 23 Scarborough North in the 2018 Toronto municipal election, finishing in second place behind Cynthia Lai.

In the 2025 federal election, Chi ran as a Liberal candidate in Don Valley North, and defeated Conservative candidate Joe Tay to become the riding's MP. She was named Parliamentary Secretary to the Minister of Health in June 2025, and has served as vice-chair of the House of Commons Standing Committee on Health in the 45th Parliament.

== Electoral record ==
2025 Canadian federal election: Don Valley North
Party	Candidate	Votes	%	±%	Expenditures
Liberal	Maggie Chi	25,822	53.22	+0.45	
Conservative	Joe Tay	20,546	42.34	+9.80	
New Democratic	Naila Saeed	1,191	2.45	–7.47	
Green	Andrew Armstrong	448	0.92	–0.89	
No affiliation	Xiaohua Gong	260	0.54	N/A	
People's	Ivan Milivojevic	260	0.54	–2.41	
Total valid votes/expense limit					
Total rejected ballots					
Turnout		48,531	62.63		
Eligible voters		77,486			
Liberal hold		Swing		–4.68	
Source: Elections Canada
