= Heather Forster Smith =

The Honourable Heather J. Forster Smith

Chief Justice of the Ontario Superior Court of Justice
- In office 2002–2019
- Nominated by: Jean Chrétien
- Appointed by: Adrienne Clarkson
- Preceded by: Patrick LeSage
- Succeeded by: Geoffrey B. Morawetz

Personal details
- Spouse: David Smith
- Children: 3
- Education: Queen's University Faculty of Law (1971)

Heather J. Forster Smith served as Chief Justice of the Ontario Superior Court of Justice from 2002 - 2019. She was the first woman to be appointed to that position.

Smith graduated from Queen's University and was called to the Ontario Bar in 1973. She began her legal career as a Crown prosecutor with the federal Department of Justice.

Her judicial career began in 1983:

- County and District Court judge 1983
- Justice of the Ontario Court of Justice (General Division) 1990
- Associate Chief Justice of the Ontario Court (General Division) 1996
- Retired from the Ontario Superior Court of Justice on June 30, 2019

== Personal life ==
Smith was married to former Senator David Smith until his death on February 26, 2020.
