= Betty-Jean Hagen =

Canadian violinist (1930–2016)

Betty-Jean Hagen

Betty-Jean Hagen (October 17, 1930 – December 29, 2016) was a Canadian-born violinist and musical educator living in the United States.

== Early life ==
Hagen was born in Edmonton and studied violin there with Alexander Nicol. Hagen won awards at the Alberta Music Festival in 1937 and 1938. She studied at the Chicago Conservatory from 1938–39, mainly with Ludwig Becker; she had received a scholarship to study both violin and piano but later decided to focus on violin.

== Career ==
During the early 1940s, Hagen played with the Edmonton Philharmonic Orchestra; in 1946, she moved to Calgary, where she played with the Calgary Symphony Orchestra and studied with Clayton Hare. She studied at the Royal Conservatory of Music from 1949 to 1951 with Géza de Kresz. In 1950, Hagen was one of the four winners of the Naumberg Competition. In 1951, she won the Eaton Graduating Scholarship, going on to study at Juilliard School with Ivan Galamian. She also won the Pathé-Marconi Prize, which allowed her to give recitals in France, Holland, Britain and Switzerland. From 1950 to 1951, she was a member of the Columbia Canadian Trio which toured Ontario, Quebec, and the United States.

In 1952, she received the Harriet Cohen Commonwealth Medal after her debut in London. In 1953, she was named "Woman of the Year" in music by the Canadian press and received the Carl Flesch Medal from the Guildhall School of Music. In 1955, she received the Leventritt Foundation Award. Hagen went on to perform with the New York Philharmonic, the Cleveland Orchestra, the Pittsburgh Symphony Orchestra, the Concergebouw Orchestra, the London Philharmonic the Orchestre de la Suisse Romande and the Vancouver International Festival Orchestra. Hagen performed with the CBC Symphony Orchestra for the Canadian Broadcasting Corporation at the Stratford Festival in 1957. In 1962, she placed 7th in the International Tchaikovsky Competition in Moscow. She also performed at Expo 67. She also gave a command performance for Queen Elizabeth II, and had her New York debut as a soloist at Carnegie Hall.

Around 1957, Hagen married Vincent Greicius, a violinist with the Metropolitan Opera Company. He died in 1993. The couple settled in Hastings-on-Hudson, New York. They had two daughters and a son. One of her daughters, Elaine Greicius Tenca, also a violinist, died in 2008 at the age of 49. Her other daughter, Valerie Greicius Oster (also Valerie Gracious) is a singer and keyboardist in the progressive rock band Phideaux.

During the 1970s, Hagen gave private lessons and coached chamber ensembles, primarily for students in their teens. She has served as concertmaster for the Westchester Symphony Orchestra, the Woodstock Chamber Orchestra and the Orange County Chamber Orchestra. During the early 1980s, she performed in a number of Canadian venues with orchestras and with a piano quartet. In 1985, she began teaching violin at Vassar College; she also taught at the University of Western Ontario from 1985 to 1989. As of 2015, she was still concertmaster for the Woodstock Chamber Orchestra. She died in 2016.
