= Victoria Village =

Coordinates: 43°44′08″N 79°18′45″W

- Neighbourhood
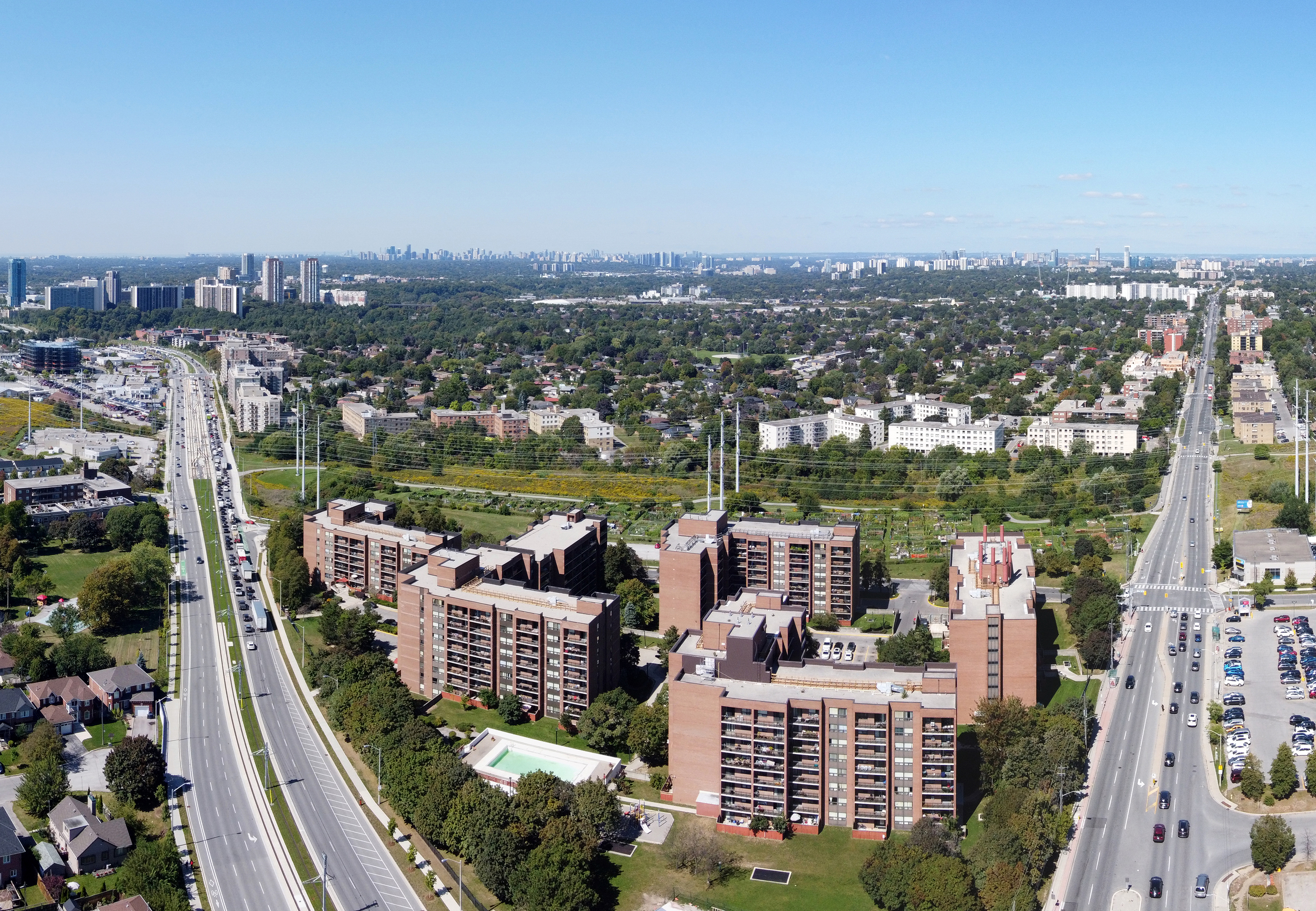
- Aerial view of Victoria Village from Eglinton

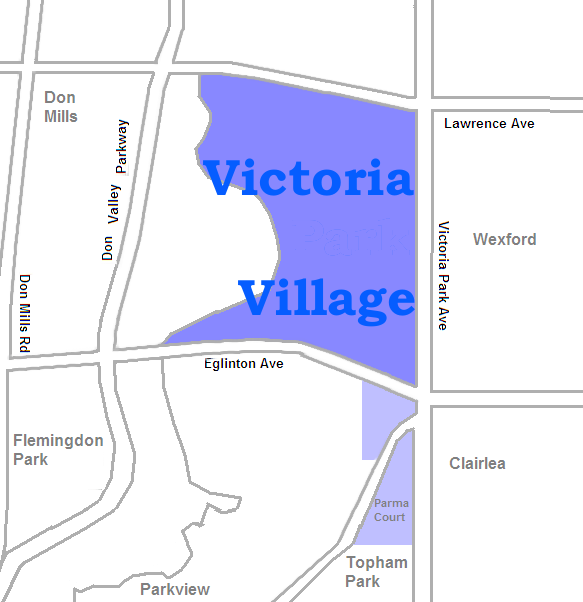
- The area south of Eglinton is only sometimes considered part of the neighbourhood
- Country: Canada
- Province: Ontario
- City: Toronto
- Municipality established: 1850 York Township
- Changed municipality: 1922 North York from York Township
- Changed municipality: 1998 Toronto from North York

Government
  - MP: Michael Coteau (Don Valley East)
  - MPP: Adil Shamji (Don Valley East)
  - Councillor: Jon Burnside (Ward 16 Don Valley East)

For the settlement established by former slaves in Guyana known as Victoria Village see Victoria, Guyana

Victoria Village, is a neighbourhood in the city of Toronto, Ontario, Canada bounded on the west by the Don Valley, on the north by Lawrence Avenue East, on the east by Victoria Park Avenue, and on the south by Eglinton Avenue East. It is located in the southeast of the former city of North York. Prior to amalgamation, Victoria Village sat at the boundaries of Scarborough, where the west side of Victoria Park Avenue was considered North York, the east side of Victoria Park was Scarborough and south of Eglinton seen as East York. For this reason, the three municipalities were connected at the intersection of Eglinton and Victoria Park and O'Connor and Victoria Park. Its population is diverse in ancestral backgrounds with a larger proportion of South Americans than most of the city.

== History ==
Much of the neighbourhood was originally owned by the Herron family, who operated an orchard on the property. Many apple trees can still be found in the neighbourhood. The area was developed in the 1950s by a group of investors led by Progressive Conservative MP Robert Henry McGregor.

Historically the area was served by Herron Valley Junior High School, now closed. The name Herron Valley comes from the Herron family who historically owned land in the area. The original home is still standing and is located on Woodthorpe Road close to Victoria Park Avenue. There remain stands of apple trees (now wild) in the valley area near Anewen Drive and Sweeney Drive, which are remnants of orchards that were once owned by the Herron family.

== Development ==
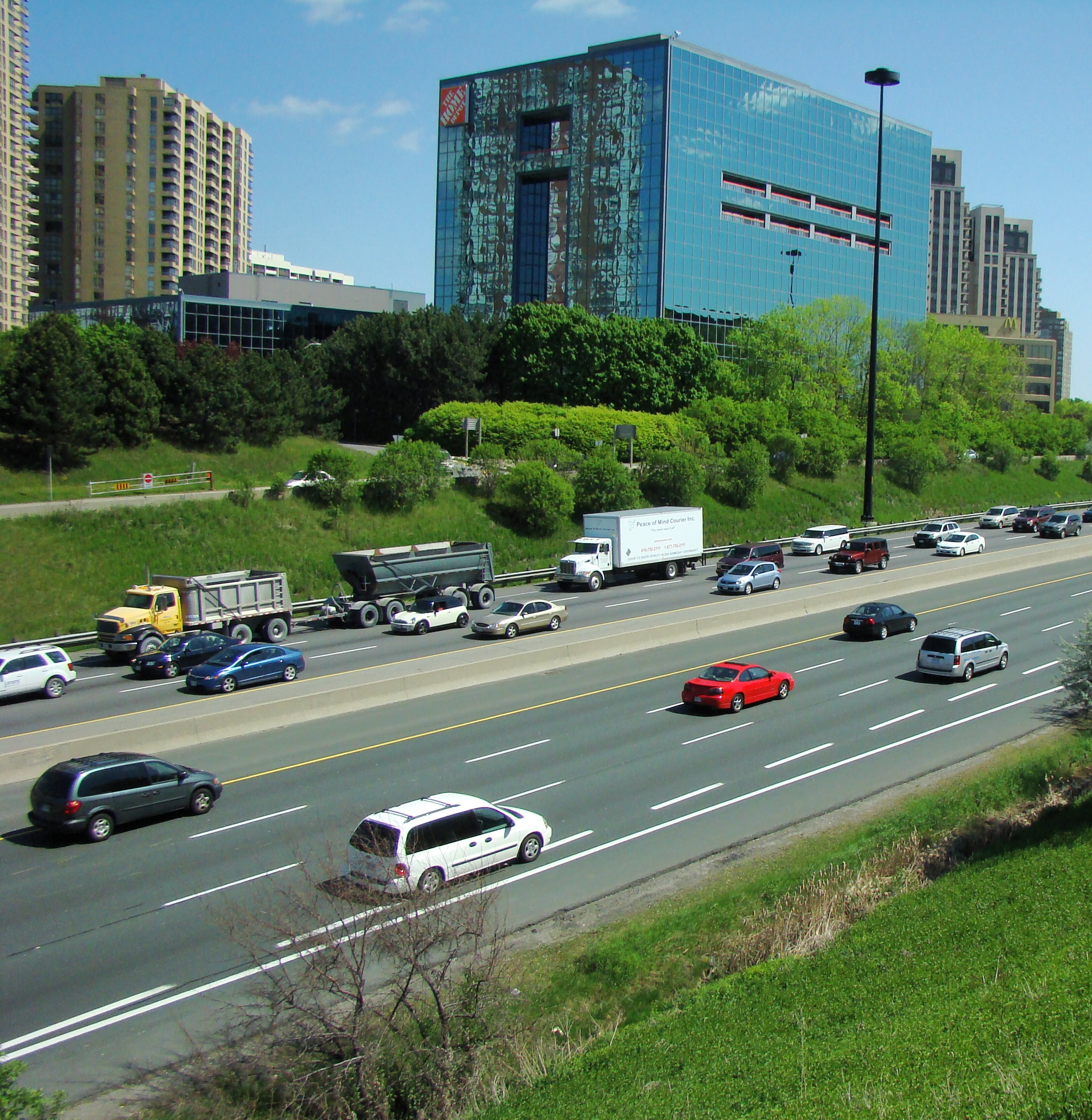
Several commercial buildings are located near the Don Valley Parkway, on Eglinton.

The neighbourhood has many high- and low-rise buildings, which are located on the edges of the neighbourhood, with mostly bungalows, some semi-detached homes, and some two-storey detached (either rebuilt bungalows, or built after the initial period of construction, which occurred mostly from the late 1950s-1960s). Apartments and condos are mostly located on the borders of the area, Lawrence, Eglinton and Victoria Park Avenues. Several commercial buildings are also present along the Don Valley Parkway, near Eglinton Avenue.

The neighbourhood borders the Don River, and some of the homes have views overlooking the Don Valley, which forms a part of the Toronto ravine system. A portion of the single detached homes in the area abut valley areas, including the Charles Sauriol Conservation Reserve.

== Education ==
Two public school boards operate elementary schools in Victoria Village, the English first language Toronto District School Board (TDSB), and the French first language Conseil scolaire Viamonde (CSV). CSV operates one public elementary school École élémentaire Jeanne-Lajoie, located on Carnforth Road. TDSB operates two elementary schools, Sloane Public School, located on a street of the same name, and Victoria Village Public School, located on Sweeney Drive.

Neither school board operates a secondary school in the neighbourhood, with CSV and TDSB secondary school students that reside in Victoria Village attending secondary institutions in adjacent neighbourhoods. The separate school boards Conseil scolaire catholique MonAvenir (CSCM), and the Toronto Catholic District School Board (TCDSB) also provides school for residents of the neighbourhood. However, neither operates a school in the neighbourhood, with CSCM and TCDSB students attending schools situated in other neighbourhoods in Toronto.

== Recreation ==
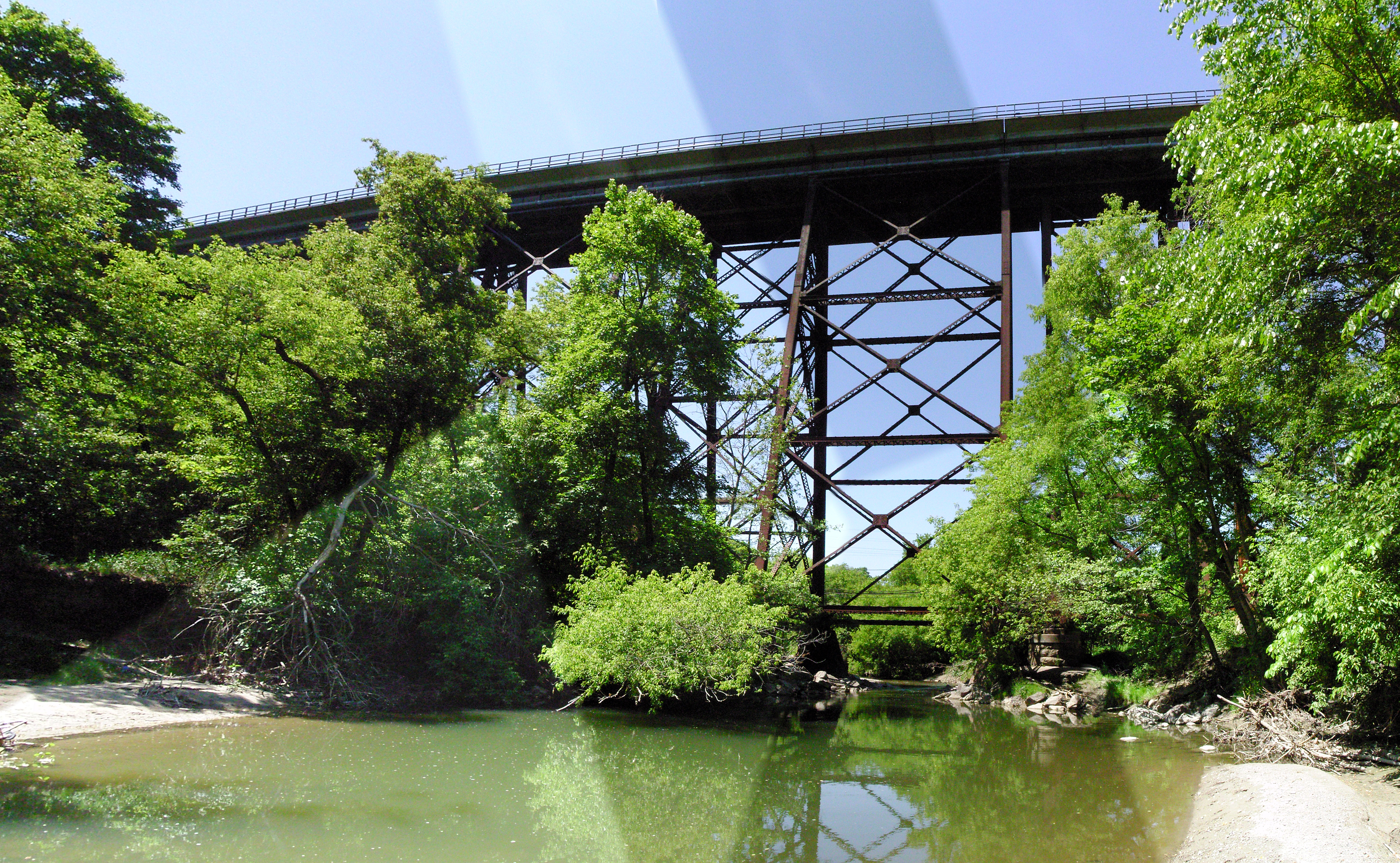
Several parks located in the neighbourhood make up parts of the Toronto ravine system.

Victoria Village is also home to the Victoria Village branch of the Toronto Public Library, located at the intersection of Sloane Avenue and Sweeney Drive. This library branch was founded in 1967 as a branch of the North York Public Library, and was renovated in 1996.

Victoria Village Public Arena is the local skating and hockey arena for Victoria Village. It is located just south of Eglinton Avenue.

The neighbourhood is also home to a number of municipal parks, including the Anewen Greenbelt, Charles Sauriol Conservation Area, and Wigmore Park. Green spaces such as Anewen Greenbelt make up portions of the Toronto ravine system. Municipal parks in Victoria Village are managed by the Toronto Parks, Forestry and Recreation Division.

== Transportation ==
The main streets are Victoria Park Avenue, a major north-south arterial road to the east; Eglinton Avenue East, a major east-west arterial road to the south; and Lawrence Avenue East, a major east-west arterial road to the north. TTC bus routes that serve the community are 24A/B Victoria Park, 34 Eglinton, 54A/B Lawrence East, 70 O'Connor, 91 Woodbine, 924 Victoria Park Express, and 954 Lawrence East Express. The Line 5 Eglinton, also known as the Eglinton Crosstown LRT, opened in 2026, runs through the community.
