= Han Dong (politician) =

Canadian politician

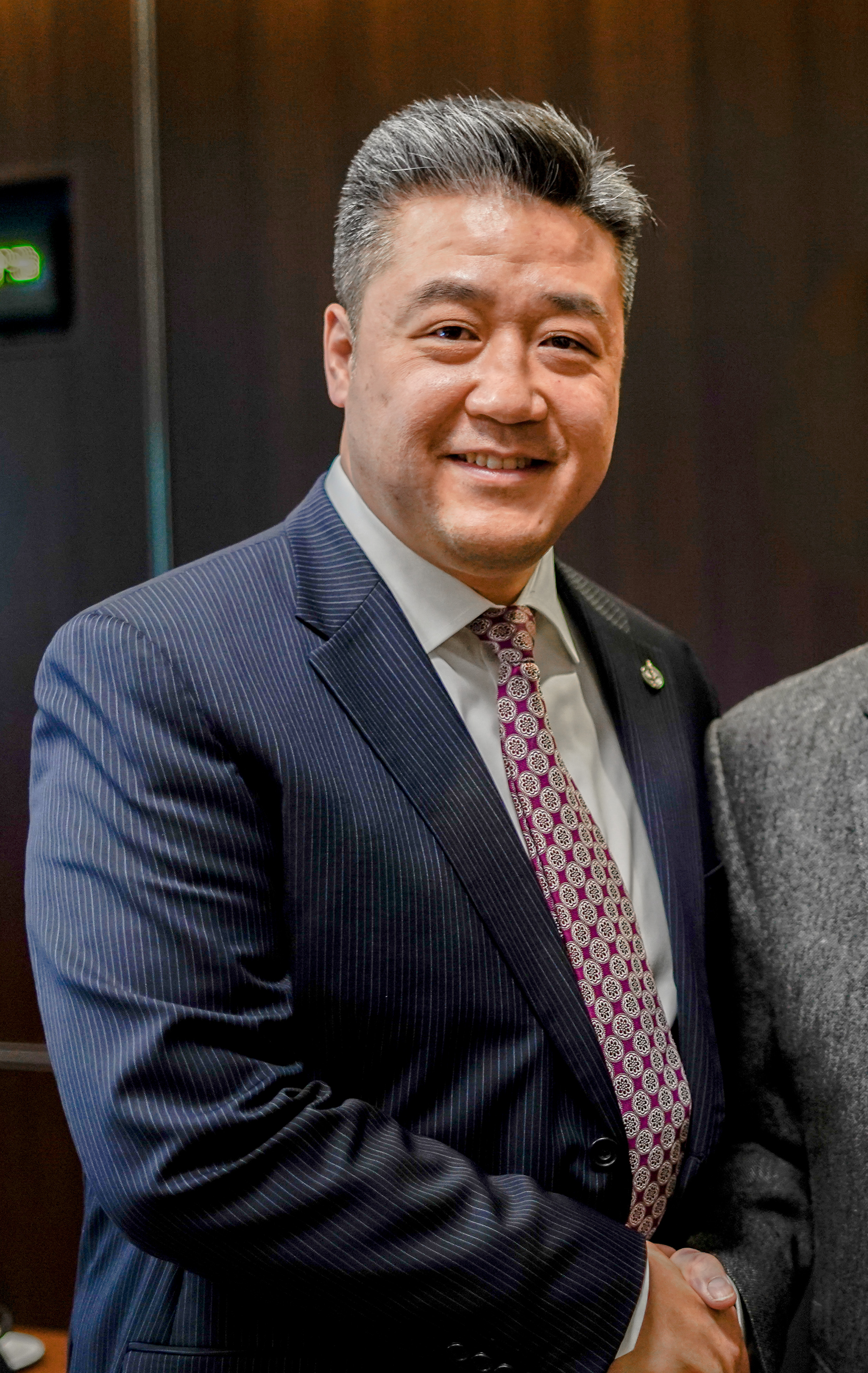
- Dong in 2020

Member of Parliament for Don Valley North
- In office October 21, 2019 – April 28, 2025
- Preceded by: Geng Tan
- Succeeded by: Maggie Chi

Member of the Ontario Provincial Parliament for Trinity—Spadina
- In office June 12, 2014 – June 7, 2018
- Preceded by: Rosario Marchese
- Succeeded by: Riding dissolved

Personal details
- Born: Han Peng Dong; 1977 (age 48–49) Shanghai, China
- Party: Independent (since 2023)
- Other political affiliations: Liberal (until 2023); Ontario Liberal
- Spouse: Sophie
- Children: 2

Chinese name
- Traditional Chinese: 董晗鵬
- Simplified Chinese: 董晗鹏
Transcriptions
Standard Mandarin
- Hanyu Pinyin: Dǒng Hánpéng
Yue: Cantonese
- Jyutping: Dung^{2} Ham^{4}-paang^{4}

Han Peng Dong (Chinese: 董晗鵬; born c. 1977) is a Canadian politician who served as the member of Parliament (MP) for Don Valley North from 2019 to 2025 and the member of Provincial Parliament (MPP) for Trinity—Spadina from 2014 to 2018.

Dong was elected as MPP in the 2014 provincial election under the Ontario Liberal Party banner, serving until is defeat in the 2018 election. He was elected to the House of Commons in the 2019 federal election and was re-elected in the 2021 election. Dong sat in the Liberal Party caucus until 2023, when he stepped down from caucus following to allegations published by Global News that he advised a Chinese diplomat against the releasing two Canadians detained in China. Dong subsequently initiated a defamation lawsuit against Global News, which was settled in 2025 with the outlet recognizing the Foreign Interference Commission's report that corroborates Dong's denial of the allegations against him.

In August 2025, the Commissioner of Canada Elections concluded that there was no evidence of election law breaches in Dong’s 2019 Liberal nomination contest.

In the 2026 Toronto municipal election, Dong ran for a seat on Toronto City Council representing Ward 23 Scarborough North. He finished third, behind Shaun Chen and incumbent Jamaal Myers.

== Background ==
Han Peng Dong was born in Shanghai. He moved to Toronto with his family when he was 13; they settled in Parkdale, Toronto. He lives in Toronto with his wife Sophie and their two children.

Dong worked as marketing director of Chianti Foods and then with the nonprofit Canada Shanghai Business Association. Since making the switch to politics, he spent nine years at Queen's Park serving as Ontario Liberal cabinet minister Gerry Phillips's MPP liaison, and most recently as a senior adviser of community outreach under then Citizenship and Immigration Minister Michael Coteau.

== Political career ==
=== Member of Provincial Parliament (2014–2018) ===
Dong ran in the 2014 provincial election as the Ontario Liberal candidate in the riding of Trinity—Spadina. He defeated New Democrat incumbent Rosario Marchese by 9,175 votes.

He was Parliamentary Assistant to the Minister of Training, Colleges and Universities; Parliamentary Assistant to the Minister of Energy; Parliamentary Assistant to the Minister of Advanced Education and Skills Development; Parliamentary Assistant to the Minister Responsible for the Poverty Reduction Strategy; Vice-chair of the Standing Committee on Finance and Economic Affairs; member of the Select Committee on Sexual Violence and Harassment; member of the Standing Committee on Public Accounts; member of the Standing Committee on Estimates. He also served as the Chair of The Cabinet Committee of Legislations and Regulations.

In February 2016, he introduced a private member's bill to license and regulate the Ontario home inspection industry, which prompted the Ontario Liberal government to draft its own government legislation for that purpose.

In March 2017 Dong introduced another private member's bill, the Reliable Elevators Act, setting time limits on repairs of elevators in residential buildings. The bill passed second reading but did not receive royal assent. Dong noted the hardship out of service elevators posed to the elderly, and to parents whose children required strollers.

In the 2018 provincial election, Dong was defeated by New Democratic candidate Chris Glover in the redistributed riding of Spadina—Fort York.

=== Municipal ===
Dong registered as a candidate in the 2018 Toronto municipal election, to represent Ward 20 on Toronto City Council. After the number of wards in the city was reduced from 47 to 25, Dong did not refile his candidacy by the September 21, 2018, deadline and was thus deemed to have withdrawn.

=== Member of Parliament (2019–2025) ===
On July 4, 2019, Dong confirmed his candidacy for the federal Liberal nomination in Don Valley North following the retirement of incumbent MP Geng Tan. Dong was elected to Parliament in the October 2019 federal election.

Dong was re-elected as the MP for Don Valley North in the September 2021 election.

Dong served as the co-chair Canada-China Legislative Association. Dong was also a member of the Standing Committee on Human Resources, Skills, and Social Development and the Status of Persons with Disabilities, and a member of the Standing Committee on Access to Information, Privacy, and Ethics.

Dong was a member of the Canada-China Legislative Association, a member of the Canada-Japan Inter-Parliamentary Group, and a member of the Canada–United States Inter-Parliamentary Group.

==== Chinese government interference ====
On February 24, 2023, Global News reported that its intelligence sources with knowledge of Canadian Security Intelligence Service (CSIS) affairs reported that Dong was an alleged "witting affiliate" in China's election interference networks. Unspecified sources claim that Prime Minister Justin Trudeau and senior Liberal party officials ignored CSIS warnings about Dong, which has been denied by Trudeau. The same article also claimed that a "Liberal insider" and former Ontario MPP Michael Chan had possibly arranged Tan's ouster in Don Valley North in favour of Dong in advance of the 2019 federal election because the Chinese Communist Party (CCP) was unhappy with Tan. Chan, Dong, and the Chinese embassy denied the accusations, with Dong describing the leaks as "seriously inaccurate". Dong and the Liberal Party also said that his 2019 nomination victory had followed all of the party's rules. According to an anonymous intelligence official and intelligence documents viewed by Global News, CSIS had also been investigating Dong due to an alleged meeting between Dong and a senior official from the CCP's United Front Work Department in the state of New York.

Dong has stated that he would welcome investigations against himself to clear his name but denies the need for a public inquiry. In response to these allegations, Trudeau has also rejected these allegations as "irresponsible" and a result of anti-Asian racism against Dong. He also stressed that Dong is unquestionably loyal to Canada.

In March 2023, he said that he was yet to be contacted by the Royal Canadian Mounted Police, Elections Canada, or CSIS concerning the allegations, and that he wanted the truth to come out.

On March 22, 2023, additional reporting from Global News, based on two national security sources, said that in February 2021, Dong had reached out to the Consulate-General of the People's Republic of China in Toronto to discuss the detention of Michael Spavor and Michael Kovrig. According to the sources, Dong told Han Tao, the consul-general, that their release should be delayed, that their release could benefit the Conservative Party of Canada, and for China to make concessions to Canada in the ongoing detention dispute. In a statement, Dong said that although he had spoken to the consul-general, he had not initiated it, and he had not suggested delaying the release of the Spavor and Kovrig, instead calling for their release. The Prime Minister's Office said it was not aware of the meeting until Dong told the PMO after media questions, and that Dong was not used as a diplomatic backchannel. On the same day, Dong announced that he would be leaving the Liberal caucus and sitting as an independent to work on clearing his name without disrupting government business and to avoid a "conflict of duty" by remaining on the government benches.

On March 23, 2023, The Globe and Mail, citing a senior government source, reported that the Trudeau government had reviewed the CSIS transcript in question and determined that there was no "actionable evidence" and that it was unable to draw the conclusion that Dong had sought to have the Two Michaels kept in detention for political reasons. The same day, Dong, as an independent MP, voted for a New Democratic Party motion calling for a public inquiry into alleged Chinese interference in the 2019 and 2021 elections that passed with the support of the opposition parties and which was opposed by Liberal MPs.

The article also revealed that The Globe and Mail had previously received the same intelligence regarding Han Dong’s alleged conversation with a Chinese diplomat but chose not to report on it at the time. Reporter Robert Fife explained: "The Globe and Mail did not report the contents of the conversation at the time because the information could not be corroborated."

Following the allegations, Dong said he had retained a lawyer and intended to sue Global News for defamation. Global News stood by its reporting, with its editor-in-chief saying Global follows "a rigorous set of journalistic principles and practices". A few days later, lawyers for Dong issued a libel notice demanding a retraction and apology from Global News, saying that if Global News failed to do so in seven days Dong would file a lawsuit. In April, Dong filed a defamation lawsuit against Global News and some of its reporters. Following his review, Special Rapporteur David Johnston said that allegations that Dong had told Chinese officials to extend the detention of Kovrig and Spavor were false. Johnston reviewed documents but did not speak to Dong when preparing his report, saying he decided against reaching out to Dong out of respect for the ongoing defamation lawsuit. Dong said he was vindicated by the report, saying that he wanted to rejoin the Liberal Party caucus. In June, Intergovernmental Affairs Minister Dominic LeBlanc said he was conducting a review to determine whether the party would readmit Dong to caucus, and that he would be reviewing other intelligence materials, as Johnston's report was a "starting point".

In September 2023, following the announcement of a public inquiry into foreign election interference, LeBlanc said that he had not had an opportunity to conduct an internal review of Dong's situation. He said that he would be meeting with Dong "in the coming days" and would provide a recommendation to Trudeau "at the right moment".

In December 2023, Chinese dissident and Uyghur rights groups questioned their safety to testify at a planned public inquiry on foreign interference with Dong present.

In April 2024, Dong testified in a federal inquiry that international students from China were bused in to vote for him in a Liberal Party election. The same month, The Globe and Mail reported that Dong was tipped off about CSIS surveillance of him in 2019. An investigative report concludes that "if the allegations against Han Dong hold true, then it is likely that Chinese interference operations have already extended to the membership process, as a Liberal membership would be required to nominate his candidacy to run in Don Valley North."

On June 20, 2024, the Ontario Superior Court Justice Paul Perell dismissed an attempt by Corus Entertainment (the parent company of Global News) to strike down Dong's defamation lawsuit. Dong and Global News announced that they settled the defamation lawsuit on June 15, 2025.

In August, 2025, the Commissioner of Canada Elections Caroline Simard concluded that there was no evidence of election law breaches in Dong’s 2019 Liberal nomination contest.

=== 2026 municipal election ===
Dong ran for Toronto City Council in Ward 23 Scarborough North in the 2026 Toronto municipal election. He received 3,676 votes, or 13.42 per cent, placing third behind former Liberal MP Shaun Chen and incumbent councillor Jamaal Myers.

== Electoral record ==
=== Federal ===
2021 Canadian federal election: Don Valley North
Party	Candidate	Votes	%	±%	Expenditures
Liberal	Han Dong	22,067	54.4	+4.0	$104,475.49
Conservative	Sabrina Zuniga	12,098	29.8	-5.6	$50,101.63
New Democratic	Bruce Griffin	4,304	10.6	+1.4	$6,816.76
People's	Jay Sobel	1,301	3.2	+2.2	$0.00
Green	Natalie Telfer	765	1.9	-2.0	$0.00
Total valid votes/expense limit		40,535	99.13	–	$108,188.62
Total rejected ballots		355	0.87		
Turnout		40,890	55.33		
Eligible voters		73,904			
Source: Elections Canada

2019 Canadian federal election: Don Valley North
Party	Candidate	Votes	%	±%	Expenditures
Liberal	Han Dong	23,495	50.4	-1.02	$101,636.63
Conservative	Sarah Fischer	16,506	35.4	-2.42	$78,956.94
New Democratic	Bruce Griffin	4,285	9.2	+0.67	$16,277.89
Green	Daniel Giavedoni	1,803	3.9	+1.67	$1,834.80
People's	Jay Sobel	482	1.0	-	$1,499.08
Total valid votes/expense limit		46,571	100.0		
Total rejected ballots		314			
Turnout		46,885	62.0		
Eligible voters		75,566			
Liberal hold		Swing		+0.70	
Source: Elections Canada

=== Provincial ===
2018 Ontario general election: Spadina—Fort York
Party	Candidate	Votes	%	±%
New Democratic	Chris Glover	24,677	49.62	+22.91
Liberal	Han Dong	11,770	23.67	-24.64
Progressive Conservative	Iris Yu	10,834	21.79	+3.33
Green	Rita Bilerman	1,815	3.65	-2.33
Libertarian	Erik Malmholt	278	0.56	
None of the Above	Adam Nobody	271	0.54	
Stop the New Sex-Ed Agenda	Queenie Yu	86	0.17	
Total valid votes		49,731	99.17	
Total rejected, unmarked and declined ballots		415	0.83	
Turnout		50,146		
Eligible voters				
New Democratic pickup new district.				
Source: Elections Ontario

2014 Ontario general election
Party	Candidate	Votes	%	±%
Liberal	Han Dong	26,935	46.28	+6.35
New Democratic	Rosario Marchese	17,759	30.51	-11.85
Progressive Conservative	Roberta Scott	8,094	13.91	+2.35
Green	Tim Grant	4,111	7.06	+1.91
Libertarian	Andrew Echevarria	729	1.25	
Vegan Environmental	Paul Figueiras	308	0.53	
Special Needs	Dan King	265	0.46	+0.16
Total valid votes		58,200	100.0	
Liberal gain		Swing		
Source: Elections Ontario

=== Municipal ===
2026 Toronto municipal election, Ward 23 Scarborough North
Candidate	Votes	%
Shaun Chen	9,828	35.88
Jamaal Myers	6,943	25.34
Han Dong	3,676	13.42
Kevin Li	3,649	13.32
Piravena Sathiyanantham	2,708	9.89
Sajawal Javed	292	1.07
John-Mark Oleh	202	0.74
Ronald Phen	96	0.35
Source: City of Toronto
