= David Smith (Canadian senator) =

Canadian senator (1941–2020)

The Honourable David Smith PC QC

Canadian Senator from Ontario
- In office June 25, 2002 – May 16, 2016
- Appointed by: Jean Chrétien

Member of Parliament for Don Valley East
- In office 1980–1984
- Preceded by: Sam Wakim
- Succeeded by: Bill Attewell

Personal details
- Born: David Paul Smith; May 16, 1941 Toronto, Ontario, Canada
- Died: February 26, 2020 (aged 78) Toronto, Ontario, Canada
- Party: Liberal; Independent Liberal (2014-16 affiliation in senate)
- Spouse: Heather Forster Smith
- Cabinet: Minister of State (Small Business and Tourism) (August 12, 1983 - September 16, 1984)

David Paul Smith, PC QC (May 16, 1941 – February 26, 2020) was a Canadian lawyer, politician and political strategist. While Smith had a modest electoral record of his own, as the Liberal Party of Canada's Ontario campaign chair during the leadership of Jean Chretien he delivered outsized victories that enabled Chretien to form majority governments after three consecutive elections. Smith served as a senator between 2002 and 2016.

== Early years ==
Smith grew up in Toronto Ontario, Victoria B.C., and graduated secondary school in Peterborough Ontario. He completed his undergraduate studies in political science at Carleton University and graduated from Queen’s University law school in 1970.

He is a great-great nephew of Sir Henry Campbell-Bannerman, a Liberal MP and Prime Minister of the United Kingdom. He was married to Heather Forster Smith, a jurist who was the first woman to serve as Chief Justice of the Ontario Superior Court of Justice (2002–19).

He became an aide and protégée of Senator Keith Davey, the principal election campaign strategist of the Liberal Party of Canada in the 1960s and 70s. He served as the national president of the Young Liberal Federation in the 1960s while Lester Pearson was party leader, and worked as the executive assistant (title of the ministerial chief of staff until the 1990s) to Walter Gordon and John Turner.

== Toronto alderman, member of parliament, and cabinet minister ==
Smith was an alderman on Toronto City Council in the 1970s. He served a period as deputy mayor and president of city council. He ran for Mayor of Toronto in 1978, but was defeated by John Sewell in a three-way split. Smith became a backroom lobbyist for developers and was instrumental in helping Art Eggleton defeat Sewell in 1980.

After his defeat in municipal politics, Smith ran for and was elected to the House of Commons of Canada in the 1980 election as the Liberal Member of Parliament (MP) for the riding of Don Valley East in a suburb of Toronto. As a junior backbench MP, Smith was tasked by Prime Minister Pierre Trudeau in 1981, the United Nations’ International Year of Disabled Persons, to report on the challenges faced the disabled. The experience hearing from 600 witnesses led him to become a vocal advocate for equality guarantee in the Canadian Charter of Rights and Freedoms for the disabled during the patriation of the Canadian Constitution.

In 1982, he became Deputy Government House Leader, and joined the Canadian Cabinet in 1983 as Minister of State for Small Businesses and Tourism. Smith was appointed to the same position when John Turner succeeded Pierre Trudeau as Prime Minister of Canada in 1984. Smith was defeated in the subsequent 1984 election.

== Law firm leader ==
Smith returned to the legal profession and served as Chairman of Fraser Milner Casgrain when it was the sixth largest law firm in Canada. He served in that role until his appointment to the Senate in 2002 and maintained a part time legal practice at the firm and its successor firm Dentons until his full retirement in 2017.

== Campaign strategist ==
Smith a key campaign strategist to the Liberal Party of Canada during the leadership of Jean Chrétien, Stephane Dion, and Michael Ignatieff. Chretien entrusted Smith to lead the Liberal campaign in Ontario, the Where more than a third of the commons seats were drawn from. Under Smith's leadership, the Liberals won 98 of the 99 Ontario seats available in 1993, 101 of 103 seats in 1997, and 100 of 103 in 2000. During a visit by US President Bill Clinton, Chretien reportedly teased Smith by introducing him to Clinton as the campaign strategist who won only 98 out of 99 seats in Ontario. and Clinton reportedly responded, “I'd settle for that. Can you come work for me in Washington? How about next Monday?” The Liberal Party's dominance in Ontario in those three general elections backstopped its majority government for over a decade.

Smith co-chaired the 2006 Liberal leadership campaign of Michael Ignatieff with former Quebec minister Denis Coderre and Ontario MP Ruby Dhalla. He was later appointed by Liberal leader Stéphane Dion to serve as party's National Campaign Co-Chair with Mark Marissen and Nancy Girard.

== Senate service ==
On Chrétien's nomination, Smith was appointed to the Senate in 2002 and was outspoken in his support for Chrétien against attempts by Paul Martin to force the Prime Minister to retire. After Martin became Liberal leader, Smith urged party unity.

On January 29, 2014, Liberal Party leader Justin Trudeau announced all Liberal Senators, including Smith, were removed from the Liberal caucus and would continue to sit as independents. The senators referred to themselves as the Senate Liberal Caucus even though they were no longer members of the parliamentary Liberal caucus.

Smith retired from the Senate upon reaching the mandatory retirement age of 75 on May 16, 2016.

== Volunteering ==
Over his long career, Smith also served as a volunteer on the boards of Toronto General Hospital, Mount Sinai Hospital, George Brown College, Exhibition Place, Massey Hall, Roy Thomson Hall, and the Salvation Army, and on the capital campaign cabinet of Tyndale University College and Seminary in Toronto. He was active in the faith communities of Yorkminster Park Baptist Church and the Church of the Redeemer in Toronto, and the Lakeshore Pentecostal Camp in Cobourg Ontario.

== Death ==
He died in February 2020, at the age of 78, due to cardiac complications.

== Electoral record ==
1984 Canadian federal election: Don Valley East
Party	Candidate	Votes	%	±%
Progressive Conservative	Bill Attewell	29,706	54.4	+11.4
Liberal	David Smith	18,578	34.0	-10.6
New Democratic	Joe Macdonald	5,842	10.7	-0.9
Libertarian	Robert Champlain	356	0.7	+0.1
Independent	Arthur V. Wright	162	0.3	+0.1
Total valid votes		54,644	100.0	

1980 Canadian federal election: Don Valley East
Party	Candidate	Votes	%	±%
Liberal	David Smith	21,944	44.6	+4.8
Progressive Conservative	Sam Wakim	21,119	43.0	-4.2
New Democratic	Saul Paton	5,713	11.6	-0.7
Libertarian	Gordon Keys	286	0.6	0.0
Independent	Arthur V. Wright	98	0.2	
Total valid votes		49,160	100.0	
lop.parl.ca

== See also ==
- List of Ontario senators
