= Joe Daniel =

Canadian politician (1954–2025)

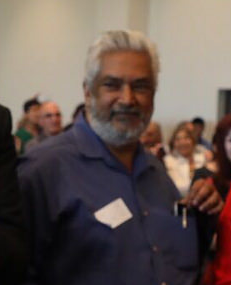

Member of Parliament for Don Valley East
- In office 2 May 2011 – 19 October 2015
- Preceded by: Yasmin Ratansi
- Succeeded by: Yasmin Ratansi

Personal details
- Born: 5 December 1954 Dar es Salaam, Tanganyika Territory
- Died: 28 January 2025 (aged 70)
- Party: Conservative
- Profession: Engineer, academic

Joe Daniel (5 December 1954 – 28 January 2025) was a Canadian politician. He was a Conservative member of the House of Commons of Canada from 2011 to 2015 who represented the Toronto riding of Don Valley East. He was the first Canadian MP of Malayali Indian descent.

== Background ==
Daniel was born on 5 December 1954 at Dar es Salaam, Tanzania. His parents were Mattackal Koshy Daniel and Chinnamma Daniel (originally from Koipuram, Kumbanad Kerala, India).

His high School Education was in Ootty Tamil Nadu, India. Later he got his bachelor's degree in Telecommunication Engineering from Plymouth University in United Kingdom 1n 1979. And he received his master's degree in Telecommunication Engineering from University of Toronto in 2000. Also received an honorary Ph.D. degree from PRIST University in India in 2012.

After his graduation, he started his career with Westland Helicopters before he came to Canada in 1987 to work on a contract with the Canadian military. In 1995, he moved to Toronto and joined (IBM) Celestica Inc. where he worked for 14 years as a manager in engineering. He was also a part-time professor at Humber and Centennial College and during this period presented a number of papers on fibre optic technology. Daniel died on 28 January 2025, at the age of 70.

== Politics ==
In the 2011 Canadian federal election, he ran as the Conservative candidate in the Toronto riding of Don Valley East. He defeated Liberal incumbent Yasmin Ratansi by 870 votes. He served as a backbench member of the Stephen Harper government.

In the 2015 election he ran in the new riding of Don Valley North but lost to newcomer Geng Tan by 6,215 votes. During the election, Daniel was recorded giving a talk in front of supporters where he was quoted as saying that the 2015 refugee crisis was part of a Muslim agenda, which he would oppose and not allow it to spread to Canada. He refused media requests for clarification of his statement, as part of his policy to avoid all interviews with media until after the election. Later, during an all-candidates debate in October, Daniel referred to the "so-called" Syrian refugees, questioned their need for food and water, and criticized the Middle East for not doing more to support them.

In March 2017, Daniel attempted a comeback by running for the Conservative Party nomination for an April by-election in Markham—Thornhill, but was defeated by journalist and radio host Gavan Paranchothy.

== Electoral record ==
2015 Canadian federal election: Don Valley North
Party	Candidate	Votes	%	±%	Expenditures
Liberal	Geng Tan	23,494	51.42	+14.13	$89,171.01
Conservative	Joe Daniel	17,279	37.82	-2.47	$70,723.13
New Democratic	Akil Sadikali	3,896	8.53	-12.20	$16,603.42
Green	Caroline Brown	1,018	2.23	+0.91	–
Total valid votes/expense limit		45,687	100.00		$205,015.85
Total rejected ballots		259	0.56	–	
Turnout		45,946	63.12	–	
Eligible voters		72,787			
Liberal gain from Conservative		Swing		+8.30	
Source: Elections Canada

2011 Canadian federal election: Don Valley East (federal electoral district)
Party	Candidate	Votes	%	±%	Expenditures
Conservative	Joe Daniel	14,422	36.78	+5.78	
Liberal	Yasmin Ratansi	13,552	34.56	-13.51	
New Democratic	Mary Trapani Hynes	9,878	25.19	+11.87	
Green	Akil Sadikali	1,114	2.84	-4.05	
Christian Heritage	Ryan Kidd	246	0.63	-0.07	
Total valid votes		39,212	100.00		
Total rejected ballots		218	0.55	–	
Turnout		39,430	57.24	–	
Eligible voters		68,890	–	–	
