= Leventritt Competition =

The Leventritt Competition was a highly prestigious international competition for classical pianists and violinists. It was founded in 1939 by the Edgar M. Leventritt Foundation Inc. of Cold Spring, New York, in memory of jurist Edgar M. Leventritt. The Leventritt Competition has now been discontinued.

The Leventritt award was sparingly given, and there was no award presented if the judges felt the required standard was not achieved.

== Award winners ==
- 1940: Sidney Foster, piano
- 1941: Erno Valasek, violin; New York Times, October 11, 1941, Amusement Section; The New York Times, February 16,1942; New York Times
- 1943: Eugene Istomin, piano
- 1945: Louise Meiszner, piano
- 1946: David Nadien, violin
- 1947: Alexis Weissenberg, piano
- 1948: Jean Graham, piano
- 1949: Gary Graffman, piano
- 1954: Van Cliburn, piano
- 1955: Betty-Jean Hagen, violin
- 1957: Anton Kuerti, piano
- 1958: Arnold Steinhardt, violin
- 1959: Malcolm Frager, piano
- 1962: Michel Block, piano
- 1964: Itzhak Perlman, violin
- 1965: Tong-Il Han, piano
- 1967: Kyung-wha Chung, violin and Pinchas Zukerman, violin (joint recipients)
- 1969: Joseph Kalichstein, piano
- 1976: No first prize awarded
- 1978: Mitchell Stern, violin
- 1981: Cecile Licad, piano

== Bibliography ==
- Horowitz, Joseph (1990), The Ivory Trade: Music and the Business of Music at the Van Cliburn International Piano Competition, Summit Books, ISBN 978-0-671-67387-1
