= Sarkis Assadourian =

Canadian politician (born 1948)

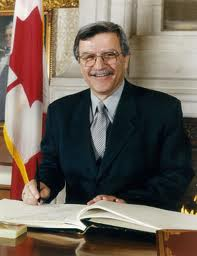
- Assadourian in October 2005

Member of Parliament for Brampton Centre (Don Valley North; 1993–1997)
- In office October 25, 1993 – June 28, 2004
- Preceded by: Barbara Greene
- Succeeded by: Riding abolished

Personal details
- Born: January 25, 1948 (age 78) Aleppo, Syria
- Party: Liberal
- Spouse: Zaza
- Children: 4
- Profession: Judge

Sarkis Assadourian (born January 25, 1948) is a Canadian politician from the Liberal Party of Canada. He became the first Armenian-Canadian to be elected to the House of Commons, with great support of the Armenian community of Toronto.

== Background ==
Assadourian was born in Aleppo, Syria. His family emigrated soon after. He studied painting at the Chicago Academy of Fine Arts. In 1970 he moved to Toronto where he worked as a property manager. He also worked as a consultant on multiculturalism for both the provincial and federal governments.

Assadourian and his wife Zaza have four children. He remains a supporter of Armenian causes and is an active member of the Richmond Hill Provincial Liberal Association.

== Politics ==
In 1988, Assadourian entered politics as the Liberal candidate in the riding of Don Valley North. He won the Liberal nomination over rival Sarmite Bulte. During the campaign debate he said that he wanted, "honest and open government, for a change." The New Democratic Party candidate, Anton Kuerti reminded him that the Tories were elected in 1984 criticising the Liberals on the same issue. Assadourian stated that he was staunchly against abortion which was a hot button issue during the campaign. He lost the election to Conservative candidate Barbara Greene by 604 votes.

In 1993 he ran again and this time won against Greene by 14,054 votes in what was a general rout of the Conservatives in Toronto and nationwide. In 1997, Assadourian moved seats to Brampton Centre. In 2003, he served as Parliamentary Secretary to the Minister of Citizenship and Immigration. He did not run in the 2004 election.

Assadourian ran in the 2010 Richmond Hill Municipal Elections in Ward 3. He placed fifth out of seven candidates. He ran again in 2022 in Ward 5, placing eighth out of 10 candidates.

== After politics ==
He now serves as a Citizenship Judge in Toronto.

== Electoral record ==
2000 Canadian federal election: Brampton Centre
Party	Candidate	Votes	%	±%
Liberal	Sarkis Assadourian	18,365	50.64	+1.79
Progressive Conservative	Beryl Ford	9,229	25.45	+10.70
Alliance	Prabhat Kapur	6,247	17.23	–11.16
New Democratic	Sue Slean	1,795	4.95	–2.72
Green	Andrew K. Roy	628	1.73	
Total valid votes		36,264	100.0	
Liberal hold		Swing		–4.46

1997 Canadian federal election: Brampton Centre
Party	Candidate	Votes	%
Liberal	Sarkis Assadourian	18,615	48.85
Reform	Don Crawford	10,817	28.39
Progressive Conservative	Sam Hundal	5,621	14.75
New Democratic	Paul Ferreira	2,923	7.67
Marxist–Leninist	André Vachon	127	0.33
Total valid votes		38,103	100.0

1993 Canadian federal election: Don Valley North (federal electoral district)
Party	Candidate	Votes	%	±%
Liberal	Sarkis Assadourian	22,504	59.86	+17.93
Progressive Conservative	Barbara Greene	7,238	19.25	–24.18
Reform	Peter Cobbold	6,068	16.14	
New Democratic	David Lu	1,395	3.71	–8.11
Natural Law	William J. Sparling	319	0.85	
Abolitionist	Lindsay George King	69	0.18	
Total valid votes		37,593	100.0	
Liberal gain from Progressive Conservative		Swing		+21.06

1988 Canadian federal election: Don Valley North (federal electoral district)
Party	Candidate	Votes	%
Progressive Conservative	Barbara Greene	17,551	43.43
Liberal	Sarkis Assadourian	16,947	41.94
New Democratic	Anton Kuerti	4,777	11.82
Independent	Bernadette Michael	577	1.43
Libertarian	Earl Epsteine	560	1.39
Total valid votes		40,412	100.0
