= Monte Kristo =

French-Eurodisco band

- Origin: France
- Genres: Eurodisco
- Years active: 1985–1989
- Past members: Gérard Dulinski; Jean-Luc Drion

Monte Kristo was a French disco band of the 1980s, known primarily for their debut single "The Girl of Lucifer", which reached #8 on French music charts.

== Discography ==
=== Singles ===
Year	Title	Charts
Year	Title	FR
1985	"The Girl of Lucifer"	8
1986	"Lady Valentine"	—
1986	"Into a Secret Land"	—
1986	"Give Me Your Night (A Touch of Love)"	—
1986	"Sherry mi-saï"	43

=== Albums ===
- Lady Valentine (1989)
