= Cynthia Lai =

Chinese-Canadian politician (1954–2022)

- 封賴桂霞

Toronto City Councillor for Ward 23 Scarborough North
- In office December 1, 2018 – October 21, 2022
- Preceded by: Ward created
- Succeeded by: Jamaal Myers

Personal details
- Born: October 19, 1954 British Hong Kong
- Died: October 21, 2022 (aged 68) Toronto, Ontario, Canada
- Party: Independent (Note: Municipal politicians are elected on a non-partisan basis in Ontario.) (municipal); Progressive Conservative (provincial)
- Spouse: C. K. Fung
- Relatives: Tony Wong (cousin)
- Occupation: realtor

Cynthia Lai (Note: /laɪ/ LY; Chinese: 封賴桂霞; pinyin: Fēng-Lài Guìxiá; Cantonese Yale: Fūng Laaih Gwai-hàah; Fung was her married name, and Lai was her maiden name) (October 19, 1954 – October 21, 2022) was a Canadian politician who represented Ward 23 Scarborough North on the Toronto City Council from 2018 to 2022.

== Background ==
Born in British Hong Kong, Lai immigrated to Canada in 1972. She worked as a realtor prior to entering politics, managing a Royal LePage branch in Scarborough before founding the Global Link Realty Group. She had also served as president of the Toronto Real Estate Board, the first Hong Kong-Canadian woman to hold that position, and was appointed to the City of Toronto's Committee of Adjustment (Scarborough Panel) in 2011. Lai received the Duke of Edinburgh Silver Medal and the Queen's Golden Jubilee Medal.

She and her husband C. K. Fung had two sons. Her cousin Tony Wong was a former member of Provincial Parliament (MPP) and municipal councillor in Markham.

== Political career and death ==
Following the resignation of Scarborough—Rouge River MPP Alvin Curling, Lai contested the by-election held on November 24, 2005, as a Progressive Conservative candidate. She came in second place with 24% of the vote, behind Liberal Bas Balkissoon.

In the 2014 municipal election, Lai ran for Toronto City Council in Ward 41 Scarborough-Rouge River, but lost to incumbent councillor Chin Lee. She ran for council again in the 2018 municipal election, this time defeating Maggie Chi to become councillor for Ward 23 Scarborough North. She was appointed to the board of the Toronto Transit Commission in October 2020.

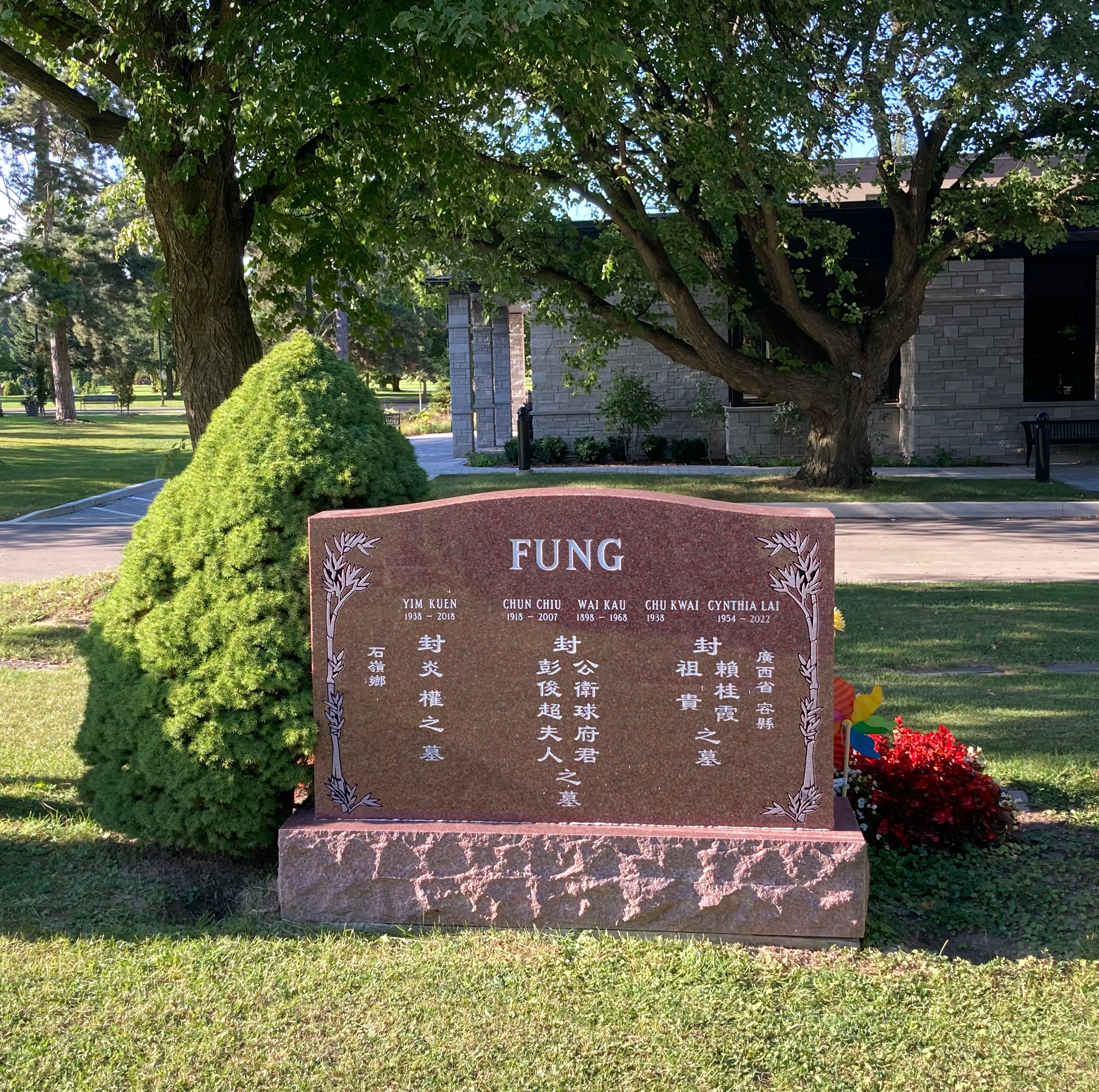
Lai's grave at York Cemetery

Lai was hospitalized on October 20 during the 2022 election campaign; she had been suffering from gallbladder cancer. She died on October 21, 2022, two days after her 68th birthday and just three days before the municipal election, and was interred at York Cemetery in Toronto. Flags at Toronto City Hall, Metro Hall and Toronto civic centres were flown at half-mast, and the Toronto Sign was dimmed in her honour.

In 2025, the City of Toronto renamed Rosebank Park in Scarborough to Cynthia Lai Park in her honour.

== Electoral history ==
=== Municipal ===
2018 Toronto municipal election
Ward 23 Scarborough North

Candidate	Votes	Percentage	Registration Date	Notes
Cynthia Lai	5,589	27.02%	May 28, 2018	Endorsed by Toronto Sun.
Maggie Chi	4,137	20.00%	June 19, 2018	Worked as a constituency assistant to former Councillor Chin Lee, Ward 41, for 5 years. Endorsement and support from Chin Lee (former City Councillor), Glen De Baeremaeker (Deputy Mayor for Scarborough), Shaun Chen (Member of Parliament, Scarborough North), Tom Chang (President of the Brimley Forest Community Association), Gary Loughlin (President of the C.D Farqhuarson Community Association).
Felicia Samuel	3,702	17.89%	July 25, 2018	Former provincial NDP candidate. Endorsed by Toronto & York District Labour Council, Progress Toronto, Toronto Star, and NOW magazine.
Neethan Saba	2,808	13.57%	July 27, 2018	
James Chow	1,487	7.19%	May 16, 2018	
Ashwani Bhardwaj	1,259	6.09%	July 25, 2018	
Sheraz Khan	453	2.19%	July 27, 2018	
Dameon Halstead	391	1.89%	June 12, 2018	
Mahboob Mian	335	1.62%	July 9, 2018	
Sandeep Srivastava	273	1.32%	June 26, 2018	
Anthony Internicola	254	1.23%	May 8, 2018	

=== Provincial ===
Ontario by-election, November 24, 2005 Scarborough—Rouge River
Party	Candidate	Votes	%	+/-
Liberal	Bas Balkissoon	9,347	57.6	-6.2
Progressive Conservative	Cynthia Lai	4,032	24.9	-0.3
New Democratic	Sheila White	2,425	14.9	+8.9
Green	Steven Toman	167	1.2	-2.3
Libertarian	Alan Mercer	100	0.6	-
Family Coalition	Rina Morra	93	0.6	-0.8
Freedom	Wayne Simmons	59	0.4	-
