= Yasmin Ratansi =

Canadian politician (born 1951)

Member of Parliament for Don Valley East
- In office October 19, 2015 – September 20, 2021
- Preceded by: Joe Daniel
- Succeeded by: Michael Coteau
- In office June 28, 2004 – May 2, 2011
- Preceded by: David Collenette
- Succeeded by: Joe Daniel

Personal details
- Born: January 4, 1951 (age 75) Dar es Salaam, Tanganyika Territory
- Party: Independent
- Other political affiliations: Liberal (until 2020)
- Profession: Accountant, management consultant

Yasmin Ratansi (born January 4, 1951) is a former Canadian politician who represented the Toronto-area riding of Don Valley East in the House of Commons from 2004 to 2011 and again from 2015 to 2021. She was elected as a Liberal in the 2004 federal election and served until her defeat in 2011. She was re-elected in 2015 and 2019. Ratansi left the Liberal Party on November 9, 2020, following a CBC News investigation that revealed she had violated parliamentary rules by using public funds to employ her sister in her constituency office. Ratansi sat as an independent for the remainder of her term and did not seek re-election in the 2021 election.

Ratansi is an Ismaili Muslim and was the first Muslim woman elected to Parliament.

== Before politics ==
Born in Dar es Salaam, Tanzania, Ratansi immigrated to Canada in 1974. She worked as a management consultant. She is a Certified General Accountant (CGA), a member of the Certified General Accountants of Ontario, and a fellow of the Certified General Accountants Association of Canada. In 2009, Ratansi was bestowed with the John Leslie Award by CGA Canada, given in recognition of CGAs "who have achieved a high and favourable profile in the Canadian community."

== Politics ==
In 1979 Ratansi joined the Liberal Party of Canada and campaigned for David Collenette. Later she was the federal Liberal candidate for Don Valley East in the 1988 federal election. In the nomination for the Liberal candidacy leading up to the vote, rival Mel Catre complained that voting irregularities allowed Ratansi supporters to vote freely while his supporters were barred from voting. A subsequent investigation failed to prove these allegations. Ratansi finished in second place 2,838 votes behind the Conservative winner Alan Redway. She served on the party's federal campaign committee in 1992 and was treasurer of the party's Ontario wing from 1993 to 1997. In 1998, she served as one of three co-chairs on the campaign to elect Mel Lastman as mayor of the newly amalgamated city of Toronto.

In 2004 she ran again facing former-member of Provincial Parliament (MPP) David Johnson. During her campaign, she spoke about the issue of immigrant underemployment. She also supported a publicly run health system. She won the riding by more than 10,000 votes.

During her tenure in Parliament, Ratansi sat through three parliamentary sessions. During this time she acted as the Official Opposition's critic for National Revenue and as critic for the Canada Revenue Agency. She also chaired a number of committees including the Status of Women Committee, and the Standing Committee on Government Operations and Estimates. She has also served as Liberal caucus treasurer.

=== Constituency office controversy and departure from the Liberal Party ===
On November 9, 2020, a CBC News investigation revealed that from 2005 to 2011, and again from 2017 to 2020, Ratansi used public funds to employ her sister, Zeenat Khatri, as a constituency assistant in her constituency office. This was a direct violation of parliamentary rules, which were amended in 2012 to add siblings to the list of individuals forbidden from being hired (previously only parents, spouses, and children were listed).

Speaking with at least six former staffers, CBC News discovered both Ratansi and Khatri took various steps to conceal their relationship in the workplace. Staffers who were informed or became aware were pressured to uphold the ruse and "be complicit in unethical behaviour" while others were reportedly kept in the dark.

On November 9, 2020, 30 hours after being presented with the findings of the investigation, Ratansi announced on Facebook that she was leaving the Liberal Party and would continue to sit as an independent while "awaiting guidance" from the Ethics Commissioner. Ratansi wrote that she "made an error in judgment by employing [her] sister in [her] constituency office, and [has] remedied the situation, but this [did] not excuse the error [she] made."

Liberal Party leader and Prime Minister Justin Trudeau condemned her actions as "deeply [disappointing]" and "unacceptable" while committing to an investigation by parliamentary administration officials.

In March 2021, the Board of Internal Economy ordered Ratansi to pay back $9,391 for employing her sister. At the time, the Ethics Commissioner was still investigating her for allegedly employing her sister, verbally harassing staffers, and uttering racist remarks about certain minorities. She did not seek re-election in the 2021 federal election.

In April 2021, a former employee of her constituency office sued her for verbal abuse.

== Electoral record ==
2019 Canadian federal election: Don Valley East
Party	Candidate	Votes	%	±%	Expenditures
Liberal	Yasmin Ratansi	25,295	59.81	+1.98	$74,656.45
Conservative	Michael Ma	10,115	23.92	-5.31	$66,318.23
New Democratic	Nicholas Thompson	4,647	10.99	+0.63	none listed
Green	Dan Turcotte	1,675	3.96	+1.37	$3,743.20
People's	John P. Hendry	562	1.33	-	none listed
Total valid votes/expense limit		42,294	99.98		
Total rejected ballots		438	1.02	+0.41	
Turnout		42,732	64.23	-1.31	
Eligible voters		66,530			
Liberal hold		Swing		+3.65	
Source: Elections Canada

2015 Canadian federal election: Don Valley East
Party	Candidate	Votes	%	±%	Expenditures
Liberal	Yasmin Ratansi	24,048	57.82	+19.43	$109,579.16
Conservative	Maureen Harquail	12,155	29.23	-7.16	$127,111.51
New Democratic	Khalid Ahmed	4,307	10.36	-11.52	$9,377.74
Green	Laura Elizabeth Sanderson	1,078	2.59	-0.21	–
Total valid votes/expense limit		41,588	99.39		$197,799.11
Total rejected ballots		257	0.61		
Turnout		41,845	65.54		
Eligible voters		63,845			
Liberal gain from Conservative		Swing		+13.30	
Source: Elections Canada

2011 Canadian federal election: Don Valley East
Party	Candidate	Votes	%	±%	Expenditures
Conservative	Joe Daniel	14,422	36.78	+5.78	
Liberal	Yasmin Ratansi	13,552	34.56	-13.51	
New Democratic	Mary Trapani Hynes	9,878	25.19	+11.87	
Green	Akil Sadikali	1,114	2.84	-4.05	
Christian Heritage	Ryan Kidd	246	0.63	-0.07	
Total valid votes		39,212	100.00		
Total rejected ballots		218	0.55	–	
Turnout		39,430	57.24	–	
Eligible voters		68,890	–	–	

2008 Canadian federal election: Don Valley East
Party	Candidate	Votes	%	±%	Expenditures
Liberal	Yasmin Ratansi	18,264	48.07	-5.92	$67,602
Conservative	Eugene McDermott	11,777	31.00	+1.84	$77,618
New Democratic	Mary Trapani Hynes	5,062	13.32	+0.43	$5,282
Green	Wayne Clements	2,618	6.89	+2.95	$4,032
Christian Heritage	Alex Kovalenko	266	0.70	–	$163
Total valid votes/expense limit		37,987	100.00		$81,387
Liberal hold		Swing	-3.88		

2006 Canadian federal election: Don Valley East
Party	Candidate	Votes	%	±%
Liberal	Yasmin Ratansi	23,441	53.99	-0.6
Conservative	Eugene McDermott	12,661	29.16	+1.2
New Democratic	Richard Alan Hennick	5,597	12.89	-0.3
Green	Wayne Clements	1,714	3.94	+1.0
Total valid votes		43,413	100.00	

2004 Canadian federal election: Don Valley East
Party	Candidate	Votes	%	±%
Liberal	Yasmin Ratansi	21,864	54.6	-12.0
Conservative	David Johnson	11,206	28.0	+7.7
New Democratic	Valerie Ann Mah	5,287	13.2	+7.4
Green	Dan King	1,172	2.9	
Christian Heritage	Ryan Kidd	351	0.8	+0.3
Communist	Christopher Black	149	0.4	
Total valid votes		40,029	100.0	

Note: Conservative vote is compared to the total of the Canadian Alliance vote and Progressive Conservative vote in 2000 election.

1988 Canadian federal election: Don Valley East
Party	Candidate	Votes	%	±%
Progressive Conservative	Alan Redway	18,719	44.7	-9.7
Liberal	Yasmin Ratansi	15,881	37.9	+3.9
New Democratic	Brant Loper	6,310	15.1	+4.4
Libertarian	Mark Meschino	538	1.3	+0.6
Independent	David Smith	271	0.6	
Communist	Maria Kontopidis	155	0.4	
Total valid votes		41,874	100.0	
