= Geng Tan =

Canadian politician

- 谭耕
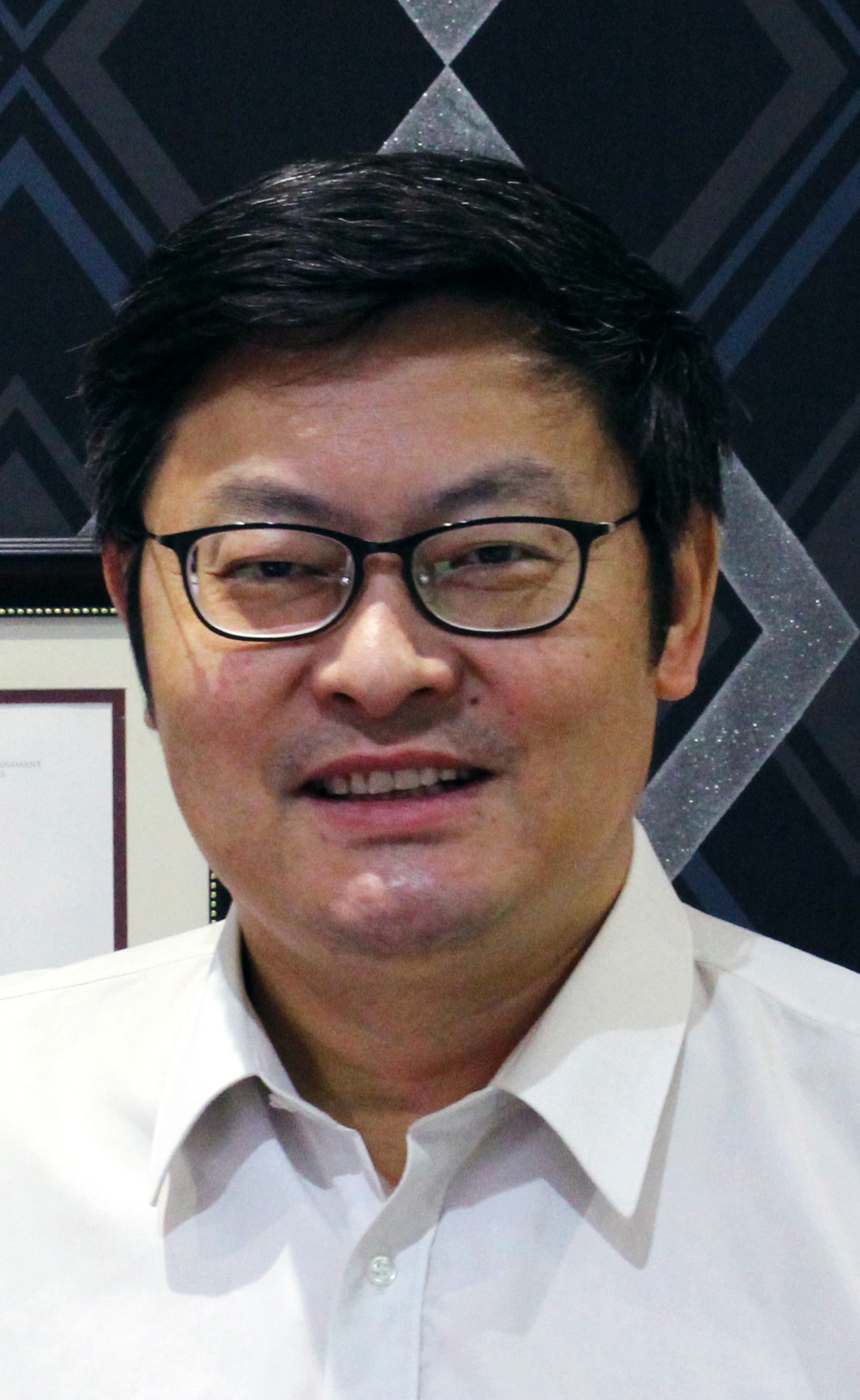
- Tan in 2019

Member of Parliament for Don Valley North
- In office October 19, 2015 – September 11, 2019
- Preceded by: Riding established
- Succeeded by: Han Dong

Personal details
- Born: 1963 (age 62–63) Hunan, China
- Party: Liberal
- Spouse: Xinglai Laura Huang
- Education: Hunan University (BEng), University of Toronto (MASc, PhD)
- Profession: Engineer

Geng Tan (simplified Chinese: 谭耕; traditional Chinese: 譚耕; pinyin: Tán Gēng; born 1963) is a Canadian engineer and former politician who served as the member of Parliament (MP) for Don Valley North from 2015 to 2019. A member of the Liberal Party, Tan is the first Mandarin-speaker to be elected to the House of Commons.

== Early life and career ==
Tan was born in 1963 in Hunan, China. He earned a Bachelor of Engineering from Hunan University in China, majoring in organic chemical engineering. Tan went on to obtain his certification as a senior engineer and held various managerial positions. He came to Canada on a student visa in 1998, attending the University of Toronto and completed a Master of Applied Science and doctorate in chemical engineering and applied chemistry.

Tan worked at Atomic Energy of Canada Limited (AECL) and Ontario Power Generation (OPG) as a nuclear scientist.

Tan founded the Council of Newcomer Organizations and is a former vice-chair of the Confederation of Toronto Chinese Canadian Organizations. Tan was the recipient of both the Ontario Service Award and the Queen Elizabeth Diamond Jubilee Medal for his service to Canada.

== Political career ==
In the 2015 Canadian federal election, Tan was elected for the riding of Don Valley North. He is the first elected MP born in Mainland China who speaks Mandarin.

According to a Canadian Security Intelligence Service report described by Global News intelligence sources, Tan was prepared to accept a 2018 invitation to travel to Taiwan, but was persuaded not to do so by Liberal MPPs Michael Chan and Han Dong.

In December 2018, Tan announced that he would be seeking re-election in the 2019 Canadian federal election. In May 2019 reports surfaced on WeChat and Chinese media that Tan was having an affair. Tan denied the accusations. On June 16, 2019, Tan announced that he would not run for re-election. On June 25, 2019, the National Post broke the news in English-language media and reported that a former constituency staffer had accused him of refusing to pay child support for a child fathered via in vitro fertilization while they were in a relationship. Tan denied the accusations, saying that he had only consented to donating sperm to her, and said he would fight the case in court.

Tan's wife Xinglai Laura Huang, a scientist with Environment Canada, ran for the Liberal nomination to replace Tan, but was barred from running by the party. He was ultimately succeeded by Dong, who had the support of Liberal insider Chan. In February 2023, Global News reported that its intelligence sources said that Tan's ouster as an MP was possibly arranged by Chan in favour of Dong, because Beijing did not like what Tan was doing. Chan, Dong, and the Chinese embassy denied the accusations.

== Electoral record ==
2015 Canadian federal election: Don Valley North
Party	Candidate	Votes	%	±%	Expenditures
Liberal	Geng Tan	23,494	51.42	+14.13	$89,171.01
Conservative	Joe Daniel	17,279	37.82	-2.47	$70,723.13
New Democratic	Akil Sadikali	3,896	8.53	-12.20	$16,603.42
Green	Caroline Brown	1,018	2.23	+0.91	–
Total valid votes/expense limit		45,687	100.00		$205,015.85
Total rejected ballots		259	0.56	–	
Turnout		45,946	63.12	–	
Eligible voters		72,787			
Liberal gain from Conservative		Swing		+8.30	
Source: Elections Canada
