= Sam Wakim =

Canadian politician (1937–2022)

Samuel Wakim KC

Member of Parliament for Don Valley East
- In office 1979–1980
- Preceded by: New riding
- Succeeded by: David Smith

Personal details
- Born: 13 February 1937 Saint John, New Brunswick, Canada
- Died: 4 December 2022 (aged 85) Toronto, Ontario, Canada
- Party: Conservative

Arthur Samuel Wakim (13 February 1937 – 4 December 2022) was a Canadian lawyer and Progressive Conservative party member of parliament who represented the electoral district of Don Valley East, in Toronto, Ontario as its inaugural member.

== Early life and career ==
Born in Saint John, New Brunswick to a Lebanese Christian family, Wakim earned his undergraduate degree at St. Francis Xavier University (B.Sc., 1959) where he met future prime minister Brian Mulroney. The two freshmen were roommates and became the closest friends of each other for the rest of their lives.

Wakim earned his law degree at the University of New Brunswick in 1962, and was called to the bar in the same year. He served briefly as a private secretary to Walter Dinsdale, Minister of Northern Affairs and Natural Resources in the Diefenbaker Ministry before moving to Ontario and was called to the Ontario bar in 1965. He served as an assistant crown attorney before his election to the House of Commons, and as a senior investigation counsel at the Ontario Securities Commission after his term.

== Confidant to the Prime Minister ==
Wakim was elected to be the inaugural member of parliament for Don Valley East in the 1979 federal election, when the Progressive Conservative Party under Joe Clark won all but one seats in the eastern half of Metro Toronto. He was the first of four consecutive one-term MPs for the district, defeated in the 1980 federal election by Liberal David Smith, later a senator and a key strategist and confident to Prime Minister Jean Chretien.

He was the sixth visible minority person to be elected to the House of Commons. With his election, all three major parties returned one Lebanese-Canadian MPs in the 31st Parliament. (Other than those three Lebanese Canadians, the 1979 election only returned one other visible minority person, the labour minister Lincoln Alexander.)

With the rise of his best friend to the party leadership and then premiership, Wakim was arguably a much more significant player in Canadian politics after his electoral defeat. He was widely acknowledged as one of the most important advisors and confidants to Brian Mulroney during his premiership. Wakim sat beside Mulroney in his candidate box at 1983 leadership convention when Mulroney was announced as the victor on the fourth ballot. Mulroney's biographer L. Ian MacDonald noted that “Hardly a day went by, wherever (Mulroney) was, that he wouldn’t ask someone to get Wakim on the phone.” And whenever they were together in a room, they would always be Sam and Bones, “the oldest and best of friends.” Not wanting to expose Mulroney to charge of cronyism for giving his best friend a patronage appointment, Wakim declined an offer to be named to the Senate following Mulroney's landslide victory in 1984.

In 2007, he represented Mulroney in litigation with businessman Karlheinz Schreiber. He also represented the former Prime Minister in litigation with the journalist Peter C. Newman.

== Later life ==
Wakim was a partner at the Toronto law firm WeirFoulds LLP for over three decades, and was named a Queen's Counsel.

Wakim died on 4 December 2022, aged 85. Upon his death, the former Prime Minister endowed the Samuel Wakim Scholarships to be awarded annually at the Brian Mulroney Institute of Government at their alma mata.

== Electoral record ==
1980 Canadian federal election: Don Valley East
Party	Candidate	Votes	%	±%
Liberal	David Smith	21,944	44.6	+4.8
Progressive Conservative	Sam Wakim	21,119	43.0	-4.2
New Democratic	Saul Paton	5,713	11.6	-0.7
Libertarian	Gordon Keys	286	0.6	0.0
Independent	Arthur V. Wright	98	0.2	
Total valid votes		49,160	100.0	
lop.parl.ca

1979 Canadian federal election: Don Valley East
Party	Candidate	Votes	%
Progressive Conservative	Sam Wakim	25,352	47.2
Liberal	Mike Smith	21,428	39.9
New Democratic	Saul Paton	6,595	12.3
Libertarian	Nick Moldovanyi	301	0.6
Marxist–Leninist	Donna Gordon	56	0.1
Total valid votes		53,732	100.0
