= Geoffrey B. Morawetz =

The Honourable Geoffrey B. Morawetz

Chief Justice of the Superior Court of Justice of Ontario
- In office 1 July 2019 – 15 May 2026
- Appointed by: Justin Trudeau
- Preceded by: Heather Forster Smith
- Succeeded by: Patrick J. Boucher

Regional Senior Justice for the Toronto Region
- In office 18 December 2013 – 30 June 2019
- Preceded by: Edward F. Then
- Succeeded by: Stephen E. Firestone

Personal details
- Education: University of Western Ontario (LL.B., 1978)
- Profession: Retired Judge

The Honourable Geoffrey B. Morawetz served as Chief Justice of the Superior Court of Justice of Ontario, Canada, from 1 July 2019 until his retirement on 15 May 2026. He served as Chief Justice for almost seven years and as a judge for over 21 years in total. He was widely recognised for his expertise in insolvency and restructuring law and for leading major modernisation initiatives within the Ontario court system.

== Early life and education ==
Morawetz graduated with a Bachelor of Laws (LL.B.) from the University of Western Ontario Faculty of Law in 1978. He was admitted to the Ontario Bar in 1980.

== Legal career ==
Following his admission to the bar, Morawetz began his legal career at the firm now known as Borden Ladner Gervais LLP, where he practised from 1980 to 1998, eventually becoming a partner. In 1999, he joined Goodmans LLP as a partner, where he remained until his appointment to the bench in 2005. Throughout his 25-year career in private practice, he was consistently recognised as a leading practitioner in restructuring and insolvency law, earning acclaim in both Canadian and international legal publications.

== Judicial career ==
=== Superior Court of Justice (2005–2013) ===
Morawetz was appointed to the Superior Court of Justice of Ontario in 2005. Based in Toronto, he heard matters in civil, commercial, and Divisional Court proceedings. From 2010 to 2013, he served as Team Leader of the Commercial List, a specialised division of the court handling complex commercial matters.

=== Regional Senior Justice (2013–2019) ===
On 18 December 2013, Morawetz was appointed Regional Senior Justice for the Toronto Region of the Superior Court. In this role, he continued to hear civil, commercial, and Divisional Court matters while assuming administrative responsibilities for one of Canada's busiest court regions.

=== Chief Justice (2019–2026) ===
On 27 June 2019, Prime Minister Justin Trudeau announced Morawetz's appointment as Chief Justice of the Superior Court of Justice of Ontario, effective 1 July 2019, replacing the Honourable Heather Forster Smith.

As Chief Justice, Morawetz pursued two major transformation initiatives for the Ontario court system. The first was the complete digitalisation of the court system, moving away from the antiquated paper-based processes that had characterised the court for decades. In 2020, he requested that the Ministry of the Attorney General procure a new end-to-end digital solution to modernise court processes. A partnership with Thomson Reuters was announced in July 2023 to support functions including filing, case management, scheduling, document management, hearing management, and exhibit management. This initiative has been described as one of the largest digital transformations of a justice system in the world.

The second major transformation was a comprehensive reform of the Rules of Civil Procedure, which had not been substantially updated in over 40 years. In autumn 2023, Morawetz and Attorney General Doug Downey announced the Civil Rules Review, assembling a working group to propose reforms making Ontario's civil justice system more efficient, affordable, and accessible. The mandate was not merely to amend existing rules but to reimagine the civil justice system to better serve litigants' needs.

Morawetz also developed a five-year strategic plan for the court, setting a roadmap through 2030 aimed at enhancing public trust in the justice system, the rule of law, and the court's ability to deliver timely and effective justice.

His leadership during the COVID-19 pandemic was particularly notable. When the pandemic struck just nine months into his tenure as Chief Justice, the court system pivoted quickly to virtual proceedings, demonstrating adaptability that exceeded many observers' expectations.

Morawetz retired as Chief Justice on 15 May 2026, having served in that role for almost seven years and as a judge for over 21 years.

== Professional affiliations and publications ==
Morawetz is a Fellow of the Insolvency Institute of Canada and a Fellow of the American College of Bankruptcy. He is also a member of INSOL International and the International Insolvency Institute. He has served as an adviser to the Canadian delegation at the United Nations Commission on International Trade Law (UNCITRAL) Working Group on Insolvency Law since 2008 and has participated in expert meetings on UNCITRAL insolvency law projects.

He was a named co-author and editor of Bankruptcy and Insolvency Law of Canada (Houlden, Morawetz & Sarra, Thomson Carswell, 1996–present) and principal editor of the Canadian Bankruptcy Reports (Thomson Carswell, 1996–present).

== Awards and recognition ==
- 2011, 2014, and 2025: Named one of the "Top 25 Most Influential in the Justice System and Legal Profession in Canada" by Canadian Lawyer magazine
- 2012: Distinguished Service Award for Lifetime Achievement from the Emory Bankruptcy Developments Journal, Emory University School of Law, Atlanta, Georgia
- 2016: Lifetime Achievement Award from the Insolvency Section of the Canadian Bar Association
- 2026: Honorary Doctor of Laws (LLD) from the Law Society of Ontario, awarded at the June call to the bar ceremonies in recognition of his contributions to access to justice and efficiency in the legal system

== Bibliography ==
- "The Honourable Geoffrey B. Morawetz". Prime Minister of Canada. 27 June 2019.
- "Ontario Chief Justice Geoffrey Morawetz on transforming the courts". Law Times. 13 February 2024.
- "Geoffrey B. Morawetz". American College of Bankruptcy.
- "Opening of Courts Remarks by Chief Justice Geoffrey B. Morawetz". Ontario Superior Court of Justice. 25 September 2025.
- "Can Ontario's Chief Justice Geoffrey Morawetz of the Superior Court of Justice exceed expectations?". Canadian Lawyer. 23 July 2021.
- "Mr. Justice Geoffrey B. Morawetz". International Insolvency Institute.
- "Retirement of Chief Justice Geoffrey B. Morawetz". Ontario Superior Court of Justice. 21 January 2026.
- "LSO honours 6 legal leaders with doctor of laws degrees". Law360 Canada. 24 June 2026.
- "Prime Minister Carney announces the appointment of new Chief Justice of the Superior Court of Justice of Ontario". Prime Minister of Canada. 6 July 2026.

Legal offices
Preceded by Heather Forster Smith	Chief Justice of the Superior Court of Justice of Ontario; 2019–2026	Succeeded by Patrick J. Boucher
