= Patrick LeSage =

Canadian judge

The Honourable Patrick LeSage CM OOnt KC

Chief Justice of the Ontario Superior Court of Justice
- In office 1996–2002
- Preceded by: Roy McMurtry
- Succeeded by: Heather Forster Smith

Personal details
- Spouse: Susan Lang
- Education: Osgoode Hall Law School

Patrick J. LeSage CM OOnt KC is the former Chief Justice of the Ontario Superior Court of Justice.

== Early life and education ==
Justice LeSage was born and raised in Tweed, Ontario. Third of four children, his father Wilfred LeSage was of French Canadian ancestry; his mother Elizabeth "Mac" McGrath was of Irish ancestry. Uninterested in farming, Wilfred went into the automobile business in 1920, running a small car dealership, and later distributing petroleum. Justice LeSage lived on Metcalf Street and attended St. Carthagh's Catholic School in the 1940s. "I played hockey, but not very well. I played football with Jack Vance, but again, not well."

LeSage did not intend to become a lawyer. He admired the Jesuit priests who taught him in school, and briefly considered becoming a priest. He applied to join the order, was accepted, but decided not to pursue it. Following graduation from high school in Tweed, he earned a Bachelor of Commerce degree from the University of Ottawa. He returned to Tweed to work in the family fuel business, including driving a fuel truck, for a year and a half. He describes his pathway to studying law as a "fluke of circumstances", as a friend in Tweed - whose brother was the Dean of Osgoode Hall - encouraged him to attend law school. He calls himself a "habitual Catholic", but did not bring Catholic principles into his role as a lawyer or judge.

He received his legal education at Osgoode Hall Law School in 1961.

== Judicial career ==
In 1975, at age 39, LeSage was appointed to Ontario's County and District Court. In 1983 he was named Associate Chief Judge of that court.

In 1990, the County and District Court was merged into the Ontario Court (General Division). He served as a judge of the Ontario Court (General Division) from 1990 to 1994. LeSage became Associate Chief Justice of that court in 1994 and succeeded Roy McMurtry as Chief Justice in 1996. After the court system was reorganized in 1999, LeSage was Chief Justice of the Ontario Superior Court of Justice before retiring in 2002. In 1995, LeSage presided over the trial of Paul Bernardo in connection with the kidnapping, torture, and murders of Kristen French and Leslihe Mahaffy in St. Catharines, Ontario. LeSage has said this was the case that affected him most profoundly in his career.

LeSage has presided in every county or district courthouse in Ontario.

== Post-judicial career ==
After retiring from the bench, LeSage practised as Counsel at the law firm Gowlings, in Toronto. He has since retired from the firm.

Since 2004, LeSage has sat on the Board of Governors of York University. In 2005 he was elected a senior fellow of Massey College. He was also appointed a commissioner of the Ontario Securities Commission.

The Government of Ontario appointed LeSage to conduct a review of the province's police complaints system; he presented his report on this matter in 2005.

The Attorney General of Manitoba appointed LeSage to conduct an inquiry into the wrongful conviction of James Driskell for murder.

== Honours ==
In December 2007 LeSage was appointed a Member of the Order of Canada for his contributions to the Ontario judiciary, notably as Chief Justice of the Superior Court of Ontario, and for his ongoing dedication to public service. In 2009, he was made a member of the Order of Ontario.

LeSage holds honorary degrees from the University of Windsor (1996), Laurentian University (2001), and the Law Society of Upper Canada (2006).

== Personal life ==
LeSage is married to Susan Lang, who served on the Court of Appeal for Ontario from 2004 to 2013.
