= Pleasant View, Toronto =

Coordinates: 43.787°N 79.335°W

Pleasant View
- Neighbourhood
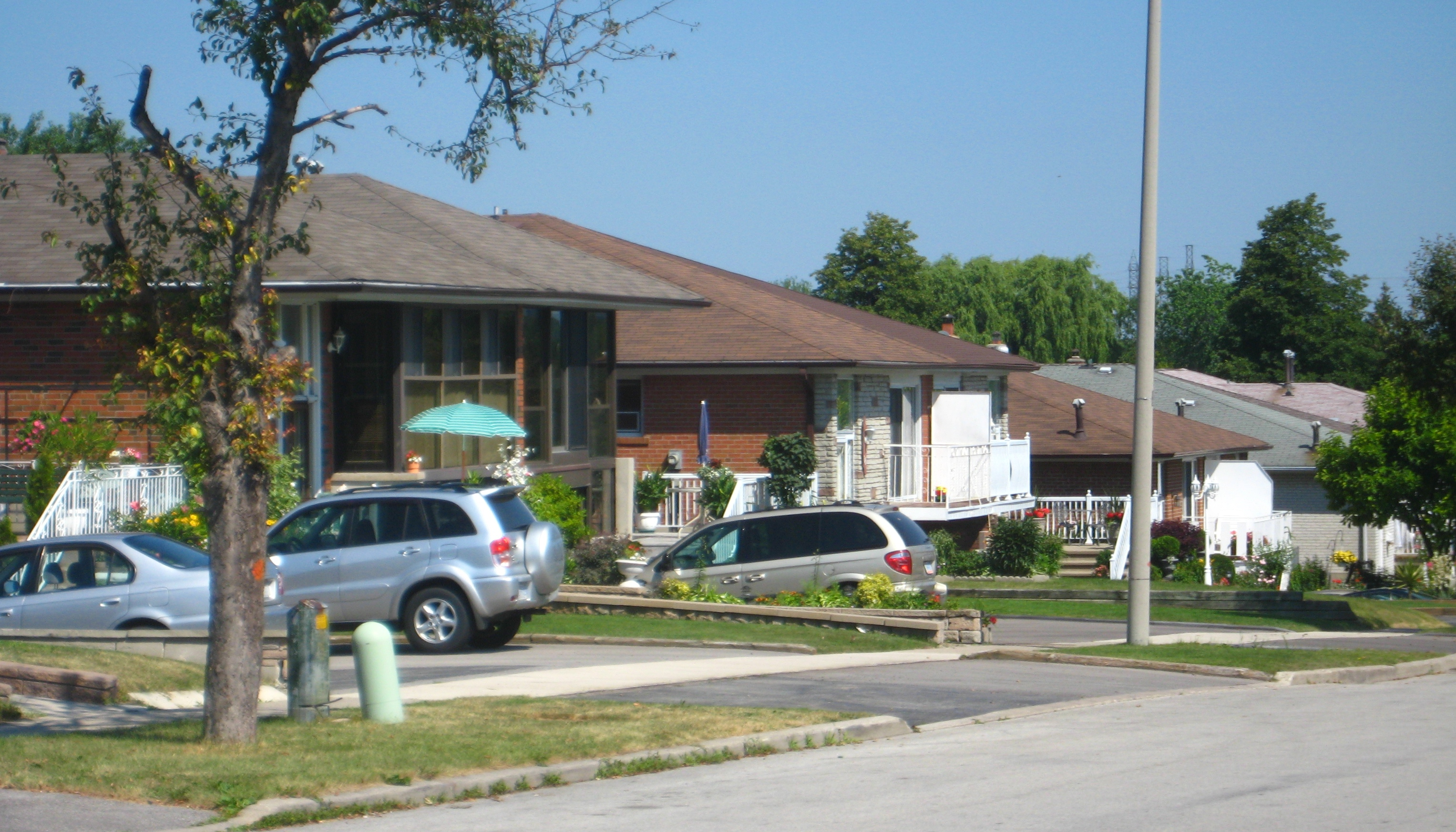
- Residences in Pleasant View

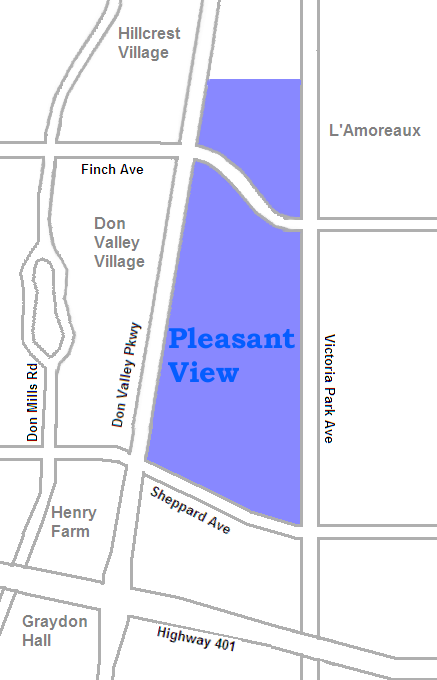
- Country: Canada
- Province: Ontario
- City: Toronto
- Municipality established: 1850 York Township
- Changed municipality: 1922 North York from York Township
- Changed municipality: 1998 Toronto from North York

Pleasant View is a neighbourhood in the city of Toronto, Ontario, Canada that is located in the district of North York at the northern end of the city. It is bordered by Victoria Park to the East, Sheppard Avenue to the South, Highway 404 to the west and the Finch hydro corridor to the north (north of Finch Avenue). The neighbourhood is home to several high-rise apartment and condominium buildings, such as The Clippers.

This has become a popular area for immigrants and many Chinese are arriving and settling in the area. The area also has a sizeable Italian and Greek population, among others. There is a huge percentage of house ownership in the area and the neighbourhood would be classified as middle income, with people on both ends of that spectrum.

== Education ==
Two public school boards operate schools in Pleasant View, the separate Toronto Catholic District School Board (TCDSB), and the secular Toronto District School Board (TDSB).

Both TCDSB, and TDSB operate public elementary and middle schools in the neighbourhood. TCDSB operates two elementary schools in the neighbourhood, St. Kateri Tekakwitha Catholic School, and St. Gerald Catholic School. TDSB operates a number of institutions that offer primary education. They include:

- Brian Public School
- Cherokee Public School
- Ernest Public School
- Muirhead Public School
- Our Lady of Mount Carmel Catholic School
- Pleasant View Middle School

Neither school board operates a secondary school in the neighbourhood, with TDSB secondary school students residing in Pleasant View attending institutions in adjacent neighbourhoods. The French first language public secular school board, Conseil scolaire Viamonde, and it separate counterpart, Conseil scolaire catholique MonAvenir also offer schooling to applicable residents of Pleasant View, although they do not operate a school in the neighbourhood, with CSCM and CSV students attending schools situated in other neighbourhoods in Toronto.

== Recreation ==
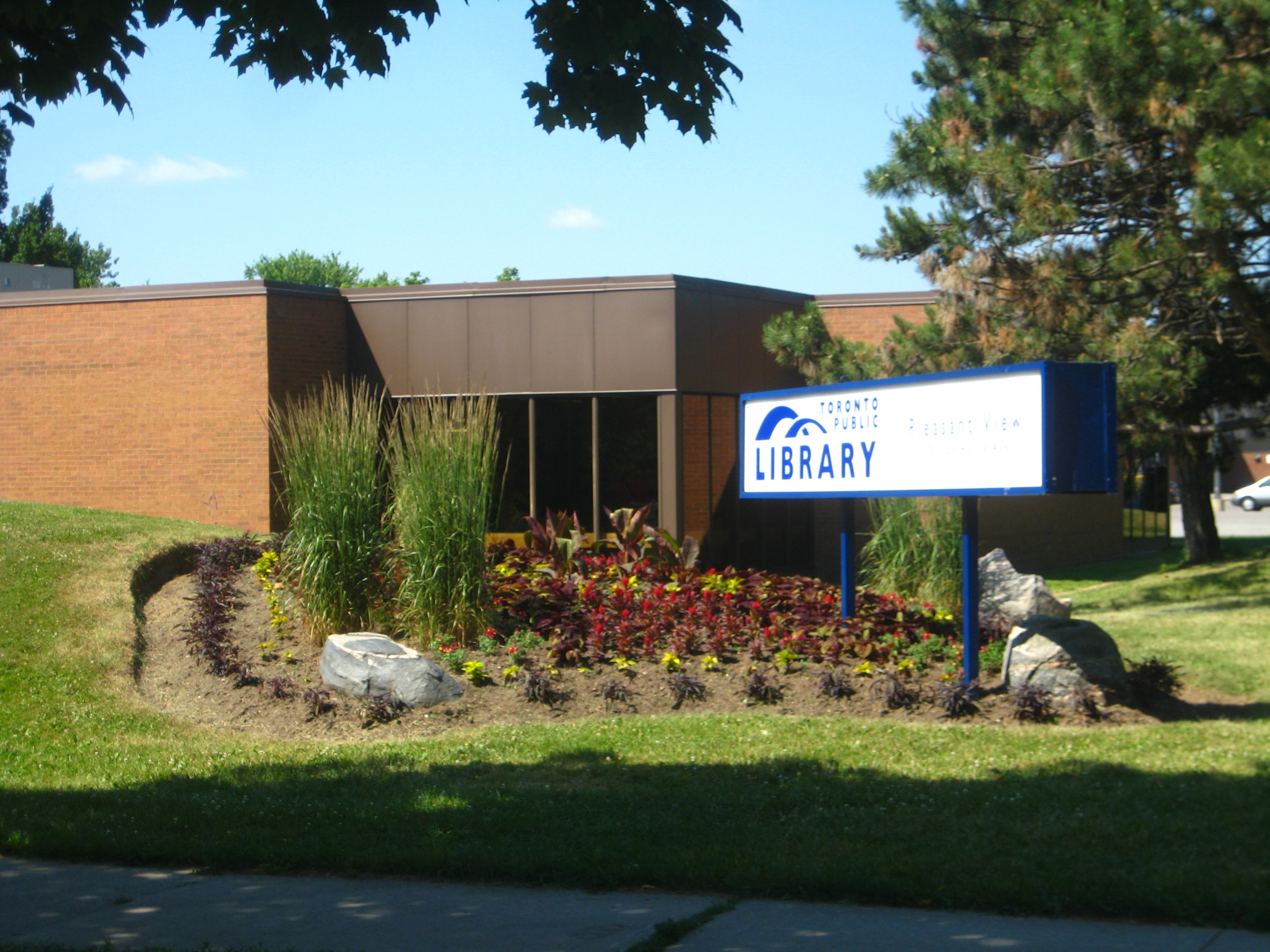
The Pleasant View branch of the Toronto Public Library.

The Pleasant View is home to Pleasant View Community Centre, and several municipal parks, including Clydesdale Park, Muirhead Park, Old Sheppard Park, and Van Horne Park. The community centre, and municipal parks are managed by the Toronto Parks, Forestry and Recreation Division. In addition to community centres, and parks, the City of Toronto government also operates the Pleasant View branch of Toronto Public Library.

The neighbourhood is also home to a strip mall Van Horne Plaza is home to many business establishments in the Pleasant View neighbourhood.

== Transportation ==
The neighbourhood is bounded by four major roadways, Finch Avenue to the north, Victoria Park Avenue to the east, Sheppard Avenue to the south, and Highway 404 to the west. The latter is a major controlled access highway, that connects the northern areas of Greater Toronto to the Don Valley Parkway, a controlled access highway to Downtown Toronto, just south of the neighbourhood. Highway 401, a major east–west controlled access highway is also located south of the neighbourhood.

Public transportation is provided by the Toronto Transit Commission bus system. Don Mills station, a subway station for TTC's Line 4 Sheppard is located west of the neighbourhood, in the neighbourhood of Don Valley Village.
