= List of MPs who stood down at the 2025 Canadian federal election =

MPs standing down at the 2025 Canadian federal election

This is a list of members of Parliament (MPs) who held seats at the end of the 44th Canadian Parliament and did not stand for re-election in the 2025 federal election. 60 MPs announced that they would not run in the 2025 federal election. One MP lost their party nomination race to run again. One MP had their candidacy revoked by their party and was barred from running under its banner.

Four MPs — Candice Bergen, Carolyn Bennett, Randall Garrison, and Marco Mendicino — announced their intention not to stand again, but subsequently resigned from Parliament before the election and the end of their term, and are not included in the figures below.

Another five MPs – Anita Anand, Nathaniel Erskine-Smith, Sean Fraser, Wayne Long, and Helena Jazcek – initially announced their intention to stand down, before changing their minds.

There were four vacant seats at the dissolution of the 44th Canadian Parliament, which saw eleven by-elections held during its duration.

Number of MPs retiring by party affiliation
Party	MPs retiring	
Party	2021 election (Note: Party affiliation of retiring MPs at the time of the 2021 federal election)	At dissolution
Liberal	40	38
Conservative	13	12
New Democratic	4	4
Bloc Québécois	4	4
Independent	0	3
Total	60	60

== Incumbents not standing for re-election ==
Member of Parliament	Electoral district	Province or territory	Date announced
Ron Liepert	Calgary Signal Hill	Alberta	February 17, 2023
Ken Hardie	Fleetwood—Port Kells	British Columbia	May 26, 2023
Lloyd Longfield	Guelph	Ontario	June 28, 2023
Joyce Murray	Vancouver Quadra	British Columbia	July 25, 2023
Omar Alghabra	Mississauga Centre	Ontario	July 25, 2023
Alain Rayes	Richmond—Arthabaska	Quebec	September 11, 2023
Richard Cannings	South Okanagan—West Kootenay	British Columbia	September 12, 2023
Anthony Rota	Nipissing—Timiskaming	Ontario	September 18, 2023
Emmanuel Dubourg	Bourassa	Quebec	November 1, 2023
Tony Van Bynen	Newmarket—Aurora	Ontario	March 11, 2024
Ed Fast	Abbotsford	British Columbia	March 14, 2024
Charlie Angus	Timmins—James Bay	Ontario	April 4, 2024
Carol Hughes	Algoma—Manitoulin—Kapuskasing	Ontario	April 4, 2024
Rachel Blaney	North Island—Powell River	British Columbia	April 4, 2024
Gary Vidal	Desnethé—Missinippi—Churchill River	Saskatchewan	April 23, 2024
Colin Carrie	Oshawa	Ontario	April 24, 2024
Pam Damoff	Oakville North—Burlington	Ontario	May 1, 2024
John McKay	Scarborough—Guildwood	Ontario	June 20, 2024
Ken McDonald	Avalon	Newfoundland and Labrador	July 2, 2024
Robert Kitchen	Souris—Moose Mountain	Saskatchewan	July 8, 2024
Michael McLeod	Northwest Territories	Northwest Territories	July 10, 2024
Seamus O'Regan	St. John's South—Mount Pearl	Newfoundland and Labrador	July 18, 2024
Francis Drouin	Glengarry—Prescott—Russell	Ontario	July 25, 2024
Karen Vecchio	Elgin—Middlesex—London	Ontario	July 30, 2024
René Arseneault	Madawaska—Restigouche	New Brunswick	August 17, 2024
Yves Robillard	Marc-Aurèle-Fortin	Quebec	September 16, 2024
Monique Pauzé	Repentigny	Quebec	October 8, 2024
Dan Vandal	Saint Boniface—Saint Vital	Manitoba	October 17, 2024
Carla Qualtrough	Delta	British Columbia	October 17, 2024
Filomena Tassi	Hamilton West—Ancaster—Dundas	Ontario	October 18, 2024
Marie-Claude Bibeau	Compton—Stanstead	Quebec	October 21, 2024
Louise Chabot	Thérèse-De Blainville	Quebec	October 21, 2024
Stéphane Bergeron	Montarville	Quebec	October 24, 2024
Brenda Shanahan	Châteauguay—Lacolle	Quebec	November 22, 2024
Churence Rogers	Bonavista-Burin-Trinity	Newfoundland and Labrador	December 20, 2024
Gudie Hutchings	Long Range Mountains	Newfoundland and Labrador	January 9, 2025
Yvonne Jones	Labrador	Newfoundland and Labrador	January 9, 2025
Justin Trudeau	Papineau	Quebec	January 15, 2025
Earl Dreeshen	Red Deer—Mountain View	Alberta	January 21, 2025
Harjit Sajjan	Vancouver South	British Columbia	January 22, 2025
Jenica Atwin	Fredericton	New Brunswick	January 22, 2025
Kristina Michaud	Avignon—La Mitis—Matane—Matapédia	Quebec	January 27, 2025
Soraya Martinez Ferrada	Hochelaga	Quebec	February 6, 2025
Martin Shields	Bow River	Alberta	February 7, 2025
Arif Virani	Parkdale—High Park	Ontario	February 10, 2025
Mary Ng	Markham—Thornhill	Ontario	February 10, 2025
Jennifer O'Connell	Pickering—Uxbridge	Ontario	February 14, 2025
Darrell Samson	Sackville—Preston—Chezzetcook	Nova Scotia	February 18, 2025
Pascale St-Onge	Brome—Missisquoi	Quebec	February 20, 2025
Lawrence MacAulay	Cardigan	Prince Edward Island	March 1, 2025
Jake Stewart	Miramichi—Grand Lake	New Brunswick	March 6, 2025
Marci Ien	Toronto Centre	Ontario	March 7, 2025
Mark Holland	Ajax	Ontario	March 13, 2025
Richard Lehoux	Beauce	Quebec	March 21, 2025
Kirsty Duncan	Etobicoke North	Ontario	March 21, 2025
Randy Boissonnault	Edmonton Centre	Alberta	March 21, 2025
Len Webber	Calgary Confederation	Alberta	March 22, 2025
Larry Maguire	Brandon—Souris	Manitoba	March 23, 2025
Kevin Vuong	Spadina—Fort York	Ontario	March 26, 2025
Han Dong	Don Valley North	Ontario	March 30, 2025
Paul Chiang	Markham—Unionville	Ontario	March 31, 2025

== Incumbent who lost nomination race ==
Member of Parliament	Electoral district	Province or territory	Date nomination held	Replaced by
Gerald Soroka	Yellowhead	Alberta	June 22, 2024	William Stevenson

== Incumbent who had nomination revoked ==
Member of Parliament	Electoral district	Province or territory	Date announced	Replaced by
Chandra Arya	Nepean	Ontario	March 20, 2025	Mark Carney
