= Peter Yuen =

Chinese-Canadian former Deputy Chief of Toronto Police

Peter Yuen MOM
- 源植勉
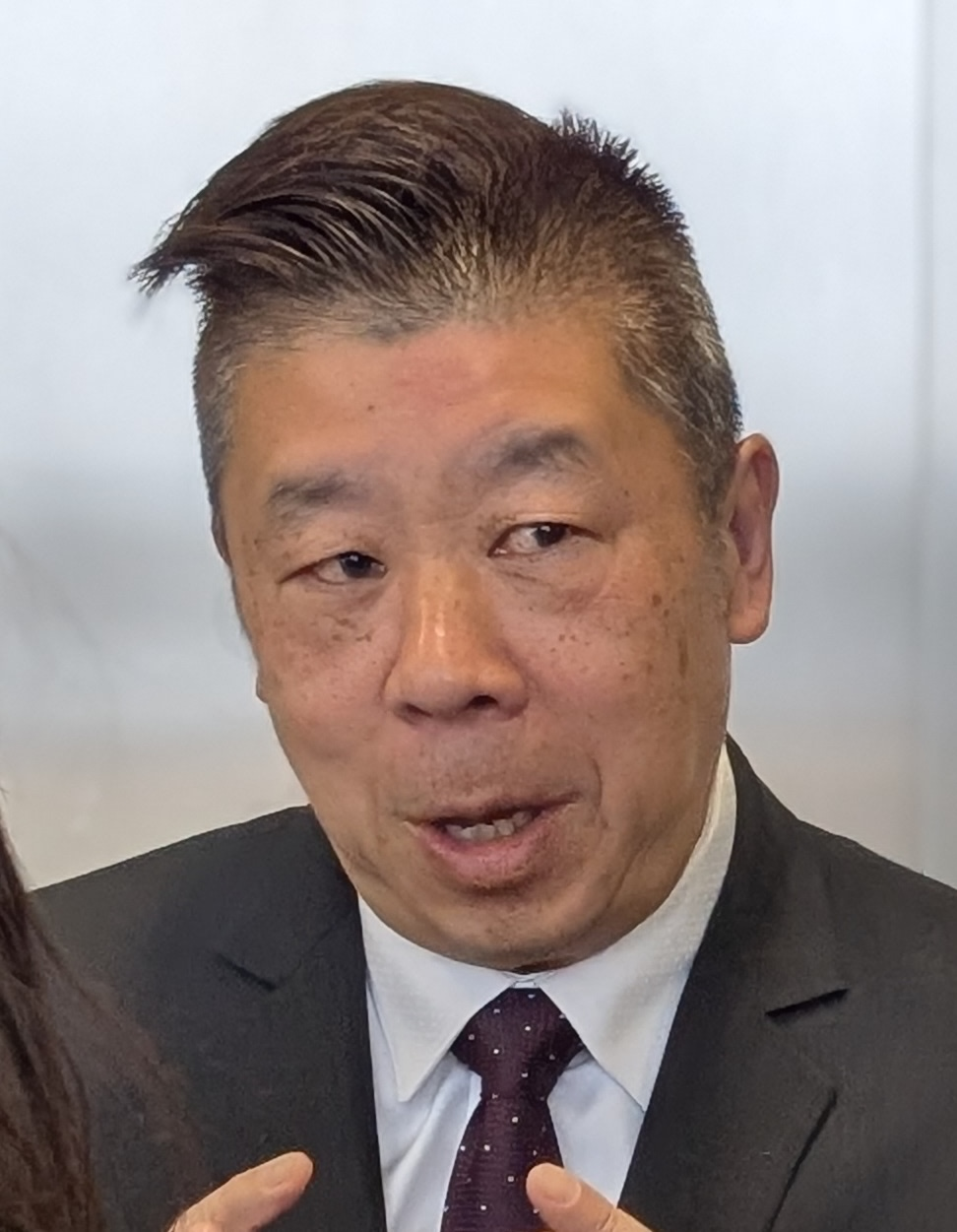
- Yuen in 2025

Deputy Chief of the Toronto Police Service (Community Safety Command)
- In office 2017–2022
- Succeeded by: Kim Yeandle (Acting)

Personal details
- Born: 1963 or 1964 (age 61–62) British Hong Kong
- Party: Liberal (federal); Ontario Liberal (provincial)
- Education: University of Guelph (BA, MA)
- Police Career
- Department: Toronto Police Service
- Service years: 1987–2022
- Rank: Deputy Chief of Police
- Awards: Order of Merit of the Police Forces; Police Exemplary Service Medal

Chinese name
- Traditional Chinese: 源植勉
Transcriptions
Yue: Cantonese
- Jyutping: Jyun^{4} Zik^{6}-min^{5}

Peter Yuen is a Canadian politician and retired police officer, serving for 35 years. He was Deputy Chief of the Toronto Police Service from 2017 to 2022 and headed the Toronto police community safety command.

== Early life and career ==
Born in Hong Kong, Yuen immigrated to Canada in 1975 at age 11, settling in East York, Ontario, where his father opened a restaurant. He attended Scarborough's Blessed Cardinal Newman Catholic Secondary School. He studied chemical engineering at McMaster University in Hamilton for two years, before joining the Toronto Police Service (TPS) in 1987. He later completed his bachelor's degree in justice studies and master's degree in leadership at the University of Guelph.

While investigating a gambling den as an undercover Constable in 1990, Yuen was severely beaten and mock executed after he was exposed as a police officer; he was later named police officer of the year. He was promoted to Sergeant in 1996, Staff Sergeant in 2000, Inspector in 2006, and Staff Inspector in 2012, before becoming the first Superintendent of Chinese heritage within the TPS in 2014. He was subsequently named one of three deputy TPS chiefs in 2017, serving until his retirement in 2022. In April 2018, he provided an update to the public on behalf of the TPS and Constable Kenny Lam following the 2018 Toronto van attack.

Yuen reportedly attended the 2015 China Victory Day Parade as a member of a Chinese-Canadian delegation.

== Politics ==
In October 2024, Yuen was officially nominated as the Ontario Liberal candidate for Scarborough-Agincourt; he lost to the incumbent Progressive Conservative candidate Aris Babikian in the 2025 provincial election.

In April 2025, he was nominated as the Liberal Party of Canada candidate for Markham—Unionville at that year's federal election. He replaced the previous candidate Paul Chiang, who stepped down after suggesting that a Conservative candidate and Hong Kong activist, Joe Tay, should be turned over to Chinese police for a bounty. Robert Fife of the Globe and Mail scrutinized Yuen for previously attending events with organizations linked to the Chinese Communist Party such as Jiangsu Commerce Council of Canada (JCCC) in which he was listed as an honorary director; Yuen told the paper that he left the JCCC a decade ago. He lost to Conservative candidate Michael Ma.

At the time of the 2025 Canadian federal election, he lived in Richmond Hill, Ontario.

== Electoral record ==
2025 Canadian federal election: Markham—Unionville
Party	Candidate	Votes	%	±%
Conservative	Michael Ma	27,055	50.65	+8.22
Liberal	Peter Yuen	25,133	47.05	–1.18
New Democratic	Sameer Qureshi	723	1.35	–5.20
Green	Elvin Kao	503	0.94	–1.85
Total valid votes		53,414	99.41	
Total rejected ballots		319	0.59	-0.41
Turnout		53,733	63.85	+11.58
Eligible voters		84,154		
Conservative notional gain from Liberal		Swing		+4.70
Source: Elections Canada

2025 Ontario general election: Scarborough—Agincourt
Party	Candidate	Votes	%	±%
Progressive Conservative	Aris Babikian	13,468	49.39	+0.36
Liberal	Peter Yuen	11,430	41.91	+4.64
New Democratic	Francesca Policarpio	1,368	5.02	–3.75
Green	Stephanie LeBlanc	556	2.04	–0.15
New Blue	Johan Yogaretnam	249	0.91	–0.11
Ontario Party	Donahue Morgan	200	0.73	–0.99
Total valid votes		27,271	99.32	–0.13
Total rejected, unmarked and declined ballots		188	0.68	+0.13
Turnout		27,459	37.41	–2.02
Eligible voters		73,404		
Progressive Conservative hold		Swing		–2.14
Source: Elections Ontario
