= Teachable moment =

Time at which learning a particular idea becomes possible or easiest

A teachable moment, in education, is the time at which learning a particular topic or idea becomes possible or easiest.

== In education ==
The concept was popularized by Robert Havighurst in his 1952 book, Human Development and Education. In the context of education theory, Havighurst explained,

"A developmental task is a task which is learned at a specific point and which makes achievement of succeeding tasks possible. When the timing is right, the ability to learn a particular task will be possible. This is referred to as a 'teachable moment.' It is important to keep in mind that unless the time is right, learning will not occur. Hence, it is important to repeat important points whenever possible so that when a student's teachable moment occurs, s/he can benefit from the knowledge."

The concept pre-dates Havighurst's book, as does the use of the phrase, but he is credited with popularizing it.

The phrase sometimes denotes not a developmental stage, but rather "that moment when a unique, high interest situation arises that lends itself to discussion of a particular topic." It implies "personal engagement" with issues and problems.

These moments can (and often do) come when least expected. Teachers and parents alike can benefit from the use of teachable moments.

== Political use ==
=== Arrest of Henry Louis Gates ===
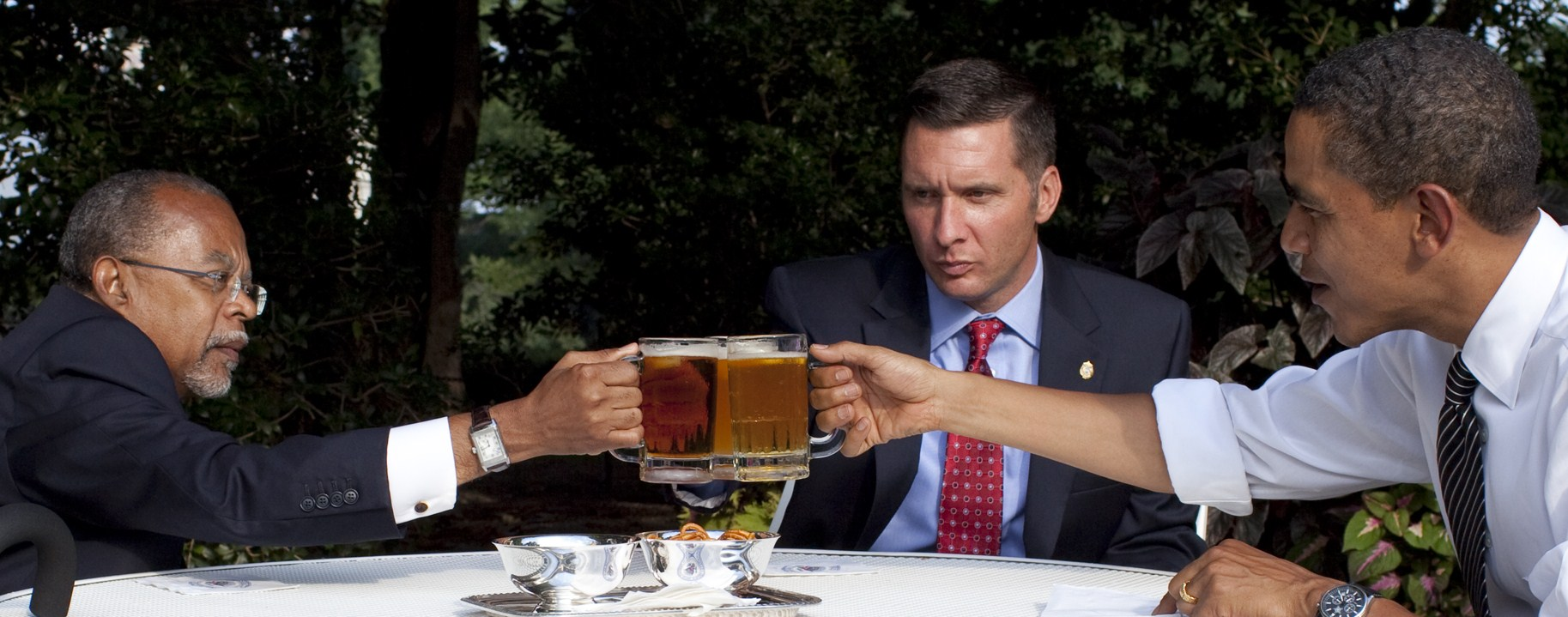
Gates, Obama, and the arresting officer meeting at the White House to discuss the incident

In July 2009, Harvard professor Henry Louis Gates was arrested at his home; the incident garnered media attention throughout the United States. The mayor of Cambridge, E. Denise Simmons, said that she hoped that the result would be a "teachable moment". U.S. President Barack Obama expressed the same:

My hope is, is that as a consequence of this event this ends up being what's called a 'teachable moment', where all of us instead of pumping up the volume spend a little more time listening to each other and try to focus on how we can generally improve relations between police officers and minority communities, and that instead of flinging accusations we can all be a little more reflective in terms of what we can do to contribute to more unity."

Obama's use of the phrase attracted considerable comment in the American media and blogosphere. Gates himself echoed the same theme, stating, "I told the President that my entire career as an educator has been devoted to racial healing and improved race relations in this country. I am determined that this be a teaching moment."

=== Others ===
On July 4, 2011, Glyn Davis, vice-chancellor of the University of Melbourne, used the term in an article in Campus Review, describing the Australian Higher Education Base Funding Review as a rare opportunity to educate a wider public about how public tertiary education is supported. Davis argued that "We (Australian Universities) must show why Australia's public universities returned to the community, many times over, the money spent providing higher education," and that this constituted a teachable moment.

During the 2025 Canadian federal election, it was revealed that Paul Chiang, a Liberal MP, remarked that Conservative candidate Joe Tay should be reported to the Toronto Chinese Consulate in exchange for a monetary bounty placed by the Hong Kong police. He later apologized. Liberal Party leader and Prime Minister Mark Carney viewed Chiang's apology as a "teachable moment" by saying it "underscores the respect with which we treat human rights in this country – the differences between Canadian society and other countries." On March 31, 2025, Chiang announced that he would withdraw from the 2025 election after the Royal Canadian Mounted Police opened an investigation into his comment.

== See also ==
- Heuristic – Problem-solving method
