= Robert Pennock =

Robert Pennock may refer to:

- Robert Pennock (politician) (1936–2019), Canadian politician
- Robert T. Pennock, philosopher
