= Soo Wong =

Canadian politician

- 黃素梅
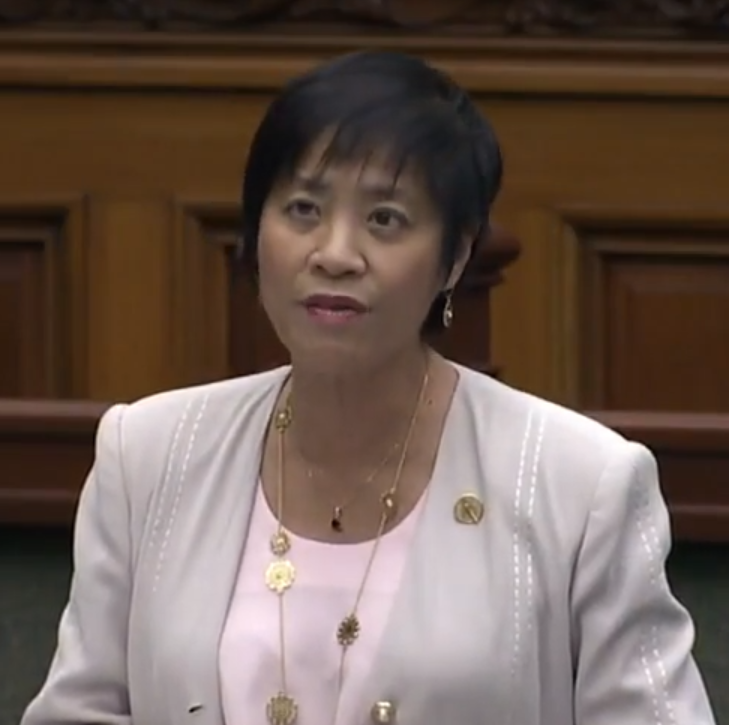
- Wong speaking in the Legislative Assembly of Ontario in 2017

Member of the Ontario Provincial Parliament for Scarborough—Agincourt
- In office October 6, 2011 – June 7, 2018
- Preceded by: Gerry Phillips
- Succeeded by: Aris Babikian

Personal details
- Born: 1962 (age 63–64) Hong Kong
- Party: Liberal
- Education: University of Toronto; D'Youville College
- Profession: Registered nurse

Chinese name
- Traditional Chinese: 黃素梅
Transcriptions
Yue: Cantonese
- Jyutping: Wong^{4} Sou^{3}-mui^{4}

Soo M. Wong (born 1962) is a former politician in Ontario, Canada. A member of the Ontario Liberal Party, she represented the Toronto riding of Scarborough—Agincourt in the Legislative Assembly of Ontario from 2011 to 2018.

== Background ==
Wong was born in Hong Kong and moved to Toronto with her family at the age of eight. She completed a Bachelor of Science in Nursing from the University of Toronto and a Master of Community Nursing from D'Youville College in Buffalo, New York. In her early career, she worked in healthcare. Wong served two terms as a public school trustee with the Toronto District School Board. Before entering public office, Wong was a member of the City of Toronto Board of Health and a nursing professor at Humber College.

== Politics ==
Wong ran in the 2011 provincial election as the Liberal candidate in Scarborough—Agincourt, defeating Progressive Conservative (PC) candidate Liang Chen by 4,685 votes. She was re-elected in the 2014 provincial election defeating Chen again, this time by 5,201 votes. She lost her re-election bid to PC candidate Aris Babikian in 2018, and was defeated by Babikian again in the 2022 election.

During her time in the legislature, she served as Parliamentary Assistant to several provincial cabinet ministers, including the Minister of Community Safety and Correctional Services (2011-2013, 2016-2018), the Minister of Training, Colleges and Universities (2013-2014), and the Minister of Community and Social Services (2014-2016). She also served as deputy speaker of the legislature from 2016 to 2018.

=== Electoral record ===
2022 Ontario general election: Scarborough—Agincourt
Party	Candidate	Votes	%	±%	Expenditures
Progressive Conservative	Aris Babikian	14,040	49.03	–1.37	$73,607
Liberal	Soo Wong	10,672	37.27	+8.98	$34,013
New Democratic	Benjamin Lee Truong	2,512	8.77	–8.68	$5,939
Green	Jacqueline Scott	628	2.19	+0.47	$0
Ontario Party	Donny Morgan	492	1.72	–	$8,379
New Blue	Rane Vega	292	1.02	–	$2,200
Total valid votes/expense limit		28,636	99.45	–	$102,205
Total rejected, unmarked and declined ballots		159	0.55	–0.48	
Turnout		28,795	39.43	–11.92	
Eligible voters		73,032			
Progressive Conservative hold		Swing		–5.18	
Source: Elections Ontario

2018 Ontario general election: Scarborough—Agincourt
Party	Candidate	Votes	%	±%
Progressive Conservative	Aris Babikian	18,582	50.40	+15.88
Liberal	Soo Wong	10,429	28.29	–21.44
New Democratic	Tasleem Riaz	6,434	17.45	+5.66
Green	Lydia West	635	1.72	–0.88
Libertarian	Mark Sinclair	244	0.66	–
Independent	Jude Coutinho	189	0.51	–
Moderate	Rubina Ansary	148	0.40	–
Trillium	Carlos Lacuna	118	0.32	–
People's Political Party	Badih Rawdah	92	0.25	
Total valid votes		36,871	98.97	
Total rejected, unmarked and declined ballots		385	1.03	
Turnout		37,256	51.35	+5.31
Eligible voters		72,558		
Progressive Conservative notional gain from Liberal		Swing		+18.66
Source: Elections Ontario

2014 Ontario general election: Scarborough—Agincourt
Party	Candidate	Votes	%	±%
Liberal	Soo Wong	17,332	49.84	+2.82
Progressive Conservative	Liang Chen	12,041	34.63	+2.64
New Democratic	Alex Wilson	4,105	11.81	-3.94
Green	Pauline Thompson	907	2.61	+0.34
The People	Kevin Clarke	387	1.11	
Total valid votes		34,772	100.0	
Liberal hold		Swing		+0.09
Source: Elections Ontario

2011 Ontario general election: Scarborough—Agincourt
Party	Candidate	Votes	%	±%
Liberal	Soo Wong	14,907	46.85	-11.22
Progressive Conservative	Liang Chen	10,222	32.13	+6.77
New Democratic	Paul Choi	5,017	15.77	+5.27
Green	Pauline Thompson	722	2.27	-2.22
Libertarian	Doug McLarty	656	2.06	
Paramount Canadians	Priya Ahuja	209	0.66	
Freedom	Sabrina Wall	83	0.26	
Total valid votes		31,816	100.00	
Total rejected, unmarked and declined ballots		246	0.77	
Turnout		32,062	43.57	
Eligible voters		73,583		
Liberal hold		Swing		-9.00
Source: Elections Ontario
