= Gerry Phillips =

Canadian politician (born 1940)

The Honourable Gerry Phillips ECO

Ontario MPP
- In office 1987–2011
- Preceded by: New riding
- Succeeded by: Soo Wong
- Constituency: Scarborough—Agincourt

Personal details
- Born: September 11, 1940 (age 85) London, Ontario, Canada
- Party: Liberal
- Spouse: Kay Phillips
- Occupation: Consultant

Gerry Phillips (born September 11, 1940) is a former politician in Ontario, Canada. He was a Liberal member of the Legislative Assembly of Ontario who represented the eastern Toronto riding of Scarborough—Agincourt from 1987 to 2011. He served as a cabinet minister in the governments of David Peterson and Dalton McGuinty.

== Background ==
Phillips was educated at the University of Western Ontario's School of Business, and worked as a managing consultant before entering public life. He worked in the marketing department of Procter & Gamble, and joined the Canadian Marketing Associates organization in 1970 (becoming its President in 1977). Phillips founded the Sales Development Group in 1979 and the Retail Resource Group in 1982, and also served on the Board of Governors of the Scarborough General Hospital during this period. He served as a school trustee for eleven years on the Scarborough Board of Education and the Metropolitan Toronto School Board eventually becoming chair of both organizations.

== Politics ==
He ran for the Ontario legislature as a Liberal in the provincial election of 1975, but lost to Progressive Conservative Tom Wells in Scarborough North by about 3,000 votes.

=== Peterson government ===
Phillips tried again in the provincial election of 1987 in the riding of Scarborough—Agincourt this time defeating his nearest opponent, David Kho of the Ontario New Democratic Party (NDP) by over 12,000 votes. The Liberals won a landslide majority in this election under David Peterson. On September 29, 1987, Phillips was appointed Minister of Citizenship, with responsibility for race relations, multiculturalism and the Ontario Human Rights Commission. In August 1989, he was transferred to the Ministry of Labour.

Peterson ministry, Province of Ontario (1985–1990)
Cabinet posts (2)
Predecessor	Office	Successor
Greg Sorbara	Minister of Labour; 1989–1990	Bob Mackenzie
Lily Oddie Munro	Minister of Citizenship; 1987–1989 also responsible for Race relations, Multiculturalism and the Ontario Human Rights Commission	Bob Wong

=== In opposition ===
The Liberals were defeated by the NDP in the provincial election of 1990, although Phillips was re-elected without difficulty in his own riding. Tory Keith MacNab finished second. In opposition, he held critic portfolios in Health, Finance and Native Affairs. In 1992, he supported Lyn McLeod's successful campaign to become party leader.

The 1995 provincial election was won by the Progressive Conservatives, and Phillips only narrowly won re-election in Agincourt, defeating Keith MacNab by about 2,000 votes. Many suspected that Phillips would run for the party's leadership when Lyn McLeod resigned in 1996, but he declined and supported Gerard Kennedy, who lost to Dalton McGuinty on the final ballot. Phillips was appointed as the party's Deputy Leader in 1998.

He was re-elected in 1999 by nearly 3,000 votes defeating Tory MPP Jim Brown whose own nearby riding of Scarborough West was abolished in the lead-up to the election. The Progressive Conservatives won re-election across the province, and Phillips remained in opposition serving in critic roles such as Native Affairs. Phillips helped lead the fight for a public inquiry into the 1995 shooting death of protester Dudley George by members of the Ontario Provincial Police.

=== McGuinty government ===
The Liberal Party won a majority in the 2003 election, and Phillips was re-elected with 61% support in his riding. Phillips was appointed as Chair of the Management Board. After a cabinet shuffle on June 29, 2005, Phillips's portfolio was restructured as the Minister of Government Services. The new Ministry took on most of the core services of the former Management Board Secretariat, Consumer and Business Services, and a large part of the Cabinet Office.

He was re-elected in the 2007 election, and was appointed Minister of Energy. In a cabinet shuffle on June 20, 2008, the Energy portfolio was given to George Smitherman. Phillips was appointed minister without portfolio and chair of cabinet.

Phillips was appointed Ministry of Energy and Infrastructure on November 9, 2009 after Smitherman resigned to enter municipal politics. On January 18, 2010, he was appointed as minister without portfolio and chair of cabinet, and also became Minister responsible for Seniors. In September 2010, the responsibility for seniors was transferred to Sophia Aggelonitis.

In 2011, he announced he would not run for re-election in the 2011 provincial election.

McGuinty ministry, Province of Ontario (2003–2013)
Cabinet posts (6)
Predecessor	Office	Successor
George Smitherman	Minister of Energy and Infrastructure; 2009-2010	Brad Duguid
Kathleen Wynne	Chair of Cabinet; 2008–2011	Rick Bartolucci
Dwight Duncan	Minister of Energy; 2007-2008	George Smitherman
Mike Colle	Minister of Citizenship and Immigration; 2007 (July–October)	Michael Chan
New ministry	Minister of Government Services; 2005–2007	Ted McMeekin
David Tsubouchi	Chair of the Management Board of Cabinet; 2003–2005	Dwight Duncan
McGuinty ministry, Province of Ontario (2003–2013)
Sub-Cabinet Posts (2)
Predecessor	Title	Successor
	Minister without portfolio (2010-2011); Responsible for Seniors	
	Minister without portfolio (2008-2009)	

== Electoral record ==
2007 Ontario general election
Party	Candidate	Votes	%	±%
Liberal	Gerry Phillips	19,447	57.82	-3.28
Progressive Conservative	John Del Grande	8,495	25.26	-4.82
New Democratic	Yvette Blackburn	3,589	10.67	+4.81
Green	George Pappas	1,533	4.56	+3.06
Family Coalition	Max Wang	572	1.7	+0.24

2003 Ontario general election
Party	Candidate	Votes	%	±%
Liberal	Gerry Phillips	23,026	61.1	+10.40
Progressive Conservative	Yolanda Chan	11,337	30.08	-13.07
New Democratic	Stacy Douglas	2,209	5.86	+2.28
Green	Lawrence J. Arkilander	566	1.5	+0.28
Family Coalition	Tony Ieraci	550	1.46	

1999 Ontario general election
Party	Candidate	Votes	%
Liberal	Gerry Phillips	18,698	50.7
Progressive Conservative	Jim Brown	15,915	43.15
New Democratic	Bob Frankford	1,319	3.58
Green	Gary Carmichael	451	1.22
Independent	Wayne Cook	371	1.01
Natural Law	Ken Morgan	129	0.35

1995 Ontario general election:

- (x)Gerry Phillips (L) 13,472
- Keith MacNab (PC) 11,337
- Christine Fei (NDP) 4,112
- Daphne Quance (NLP) 313

1990 Ontario general election:

- (x)Gerry Phillips (L) 13,347
- Keith MacNab (PC) 8,640
- Ayoub Ali (NDP) 6,763
- Bill Galster (Lbt) 1,368

1987 Ontario general election:

- Gerry Phillips (L) 19,101
- David Kho (NDP) 7,021
- Adrienne Johnson (PC) 6,284
- Barry Coyne (Lbt) 794
