= Joe Tay =

Actor, singer and activist

- 鄭敬基 (Chinese)
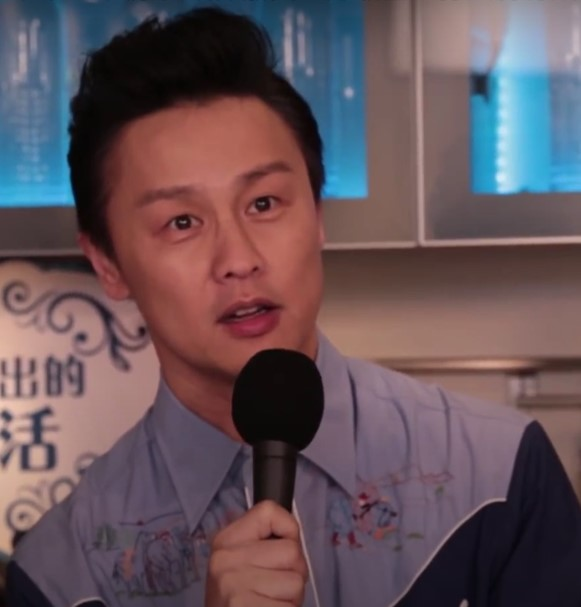
- Joe Tay in 2014
- Born: 1962 or 1963 (age 63–64); British Hong Kong
- Education: University of Toronto
- Occupations: Activist; Actor; Singer; TV Host; Radio personality
- Political party: Conservative Party of Canada
- Movement: Hong Kong democracy movement
- Partner(s): Winsome (m. 1990; div. 1998) Angie (麥曉安) (m. 2016)
- Musical career
- Genres: Cantopop
- Instruments: Guitar, piano
- Years active: 1986 –
- Website: https://www.joetay.ca/

Joseph Tay King Kei is a Hong Kong–Canadian actor, singer and activist.

== Early life ==
Tay was born into a Christian Hong Kong family. His name "King Kei" and his twin sister's name "Oi Kei" mean "to revere and love Christ". He went to Canada for undergraduate studies and enrolled in the University of Toronto in 1981. He returned to Hong Kong after graduating in 1985.

== Career ==
In 1986, Tay co-founded the musical duo Wind and Cloud (風雲樂隊) with university colleague Ringo Chan. The duo gained recognition with their song "Anita." After the duo disbanded, Tay continued his music career and became known for his 1987 megahit duet with Bobo Wong (黃寶欣), "Knocking a Wine Glass on a Piano" (酒杯敲鋼琴), a Cantonese cover of Monte Kristo's "Lady Valentine". Beyond music, Tay expanded into acting, securing roles in television series produced by TVB and RTHK, as well as in films, with notable television appearances such as Burning Flame.

In September 2019, TVB stopped renewing his contract, which was believed to be related to his participation in the 2019–2020 Hong Kong protests. In July 2020, he revealed that he and his family had returned to Canada and would continue to push for democracy in Hong Kong from overseas.

In 2021, he started the YouTube channel "HongKonger Station" in Canada. On 22 January 2024, he announced on his channel that he would seek the Conservative Party of Canada nomination in the riding of Markham—Unionville in the 2025 Canadian federal election against former MP Bob Saroya and future MP Michael Ma.

On December 24, 2024, the Hong Kong Police Force's National Security Department issued a warrant for Tay's arrest and offered a bounty of HK$1,000,000. The HKPD alleged that Tay violated the Hong Kong National Security Law, including charges of "inciting secession" and "colluding with foreign forces". The warrant and bounty are widely criticized as a form of transnational repression to silence dissent, as well as an attempt to interfere with Canada's upcoming election. On the same day, Canada's Minister of Foreign Affairs, Melanie Joly, issued a statement saying that "Hong Kong authorities are targeting" Tay (and other people) for exercising freedom of speech and that Canada "deplores" the warrants and calls to "end prosecution of individuals under this law". In May 2025, Hong Kong local media reported that Tay's cousin and the cousin's wife had been brought in by police on May 8 to assist in the investigation against Tay.

On 24 March 2025, the Tay was named the Conservative Party candidate for Don Valley North. During the 2025 Canadian federal election, Tay rejected an apology from Liberal Party candidate Paul Chiang who remarked in January that someone should claim the bounty placed on Tay. Chiang later resigned after the Royal Canadian Mounted Police opened an investigation into Chiang's comment. In April, Canada's Security and Intelligence Threats to Elections (SITE) Task Force identified an online repression campaign against Tay involving amplification of content against him and suppression of keywords related to him on China-based social networks. On 28 April 2025, Tay lost the election to Liberal candidate Maggie Chi.

At the time of the 2025 Canadian federal election, he lived in Markham, Ontario.

== Electoral record ==
2025 Canadian federal election: Don Valley North
Party	Candidate	Votes	%	±%	Expenditures
Liberal	Maggie Chi	25,822	53.22	+0.45	
Conservative	Joe Tay	20,546	42.34	+9.80	
New Democratic	Naila Saeed	1,191	2.45	–7.47	
Green	Andrew Armstrong	448	0.92	–0.89	
No affiliation	Xiaohua Gong	260	0.54	N/A	
People's	Ivan Milivojevic	260	0.54	–2.41	
Total valid votes/expense limit					
Total rejected ballots					
Turnout		48,531	62.63		
Eligible voters		77,486			
Liberal hold		Swing		–4.68	
Source: Elections Canada
