= Scarborough—Agincourt (provincial electoral district) =

Provincial electoral district in Ontario, Canada

Coordinates: 43.796°N 79.310°W

Ontario electoral district
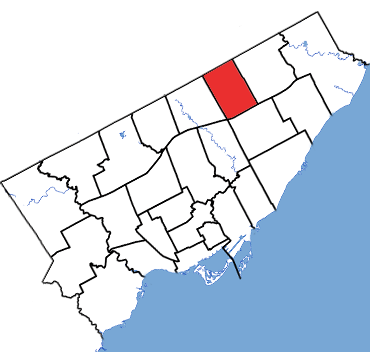
- Scarborough—Agincourt in relation to the other Toronto ridings

Provincial electoral district
- Legislature: Legislative Assembly of Ontario
MPP
Aris Babikian
Progressive Conservative
- District created: 1987
- First contested: 1987
- Last contested: 2025

Demographics
- Population (2021): 104,423
- Electors (2025): 73,404
- Area (km²): 21
- Pop. density (per km²): 4,972.5
- Census division: Toronto
- Census subdivision: Toronto

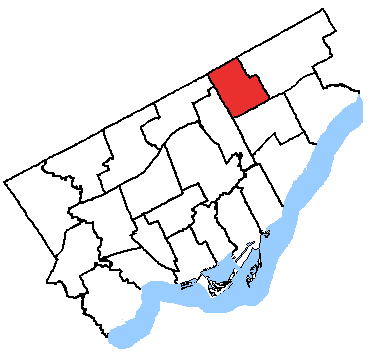
Scarborough-Agincourt from 2003 to 2018

Scarborough—Agincourt is a provincial electoral district in Ontario, Canada, that has been represented in the Legislative Assembly of Ontario since 1987. The riding covers the northwest of the Scarborough part of Toronto. It is bounded on the west by Victoria Park Avenue, on the north by the Toronto city limits (Steeles Avenue East), on the east by Midland Avenue, and on the south by Highway 401. It contains the neighbourhoods of Steeles, L'Amoreaux, Tam O'Shanter-Sullivan, Agincourt (west of Midland Avenue), and Milliken (west of Midland Avenue).

== History ==
The provincial electoral district was created in 1999 when provincial ridings were defined to have the same borders as federal ridings.

== Demographics ==
=== Population ===
Total (2006): 111,867
Growth (2001–2006): +1,197 (+1.1%)
Electors:

Federal (2006): 72,895 (65.2%)
Provincial (2007): 73,876 (66%)

Gender* (2001):

Male: 52,525 (47.5%)
Female: 58,145 (52.5%)

Identifiable groups** (2001):

Visible minority: 76,195 (69.3%)

Chinese: 41,135 (37.4%)
South Asian: 14,680 (13.3%)
Black: 7,450 (6.8%)
Filipino: 3,470 (3.2%)
West Asian: 1,830 (1.7%)
Arab: 1,775 (1.6%)
Other visible minority: 1,560 (1.4%)
Multiple visible minorities: 1,385 (1.3%)
Latin American: 825 (0.8%)
Southeast Asian: 800 (0.7%)
Korean: 670 (0.6%)
Japanese: 625 (0.6%)
Aboriginal: 185 (0.2%)

Immigrant: 70,315 (63.9%)
Non-permanent residents: 1,780 (1.6%)

=== Language ===
Mother tongue** (2001):

English: 39,880 (36.3%)
French: 775 (0.7%)
Non-official languages: 66,755 (60.7%)
Multiple responses: 2,590 (2.4%)

Knowledge of official languages** (2001):

English only: 92,290 (83.9%)
Neither English nor French: 10,855 (9.9%)
English and French: 6,755 (6.1%)
French only: 105 (0.001%)

Home language** (2001):

English: 42,110 (38.3%)
Non-official languages: 34,760 (31.6%)
English and non-official language: 31,875 (29%)
English and French: 625 (0.6%)
English, French, and non-official language: 430 (0.4%)
French: 110 (0.1%)
French and non-official language: 85 (0.1%)

=== Education ===
Education*** (2001):

Less than high school: 29,385 (32.6%)
High school: 22,950 (25%)
Trade school: 5,205 (5.7%)
College: 11,775 (12.8%)
University: 22,530 (24.5%)

=== Income and work ===
Labour force*** (2001):

Participation: 55,510 (60.4%)
Employed: 50,840 (55.4%)
Unemployed: 4,670 (8.4%)

Average income*** (2001):

Individual: $26,473
Household: $62,836
Family: $60,742

Median income (2007):

Household: $51,762

=== Families and dwellings ===
Persons per family (2001): 3.1

Occupied private dwellings (2001):

Total: 35,615
Owned: 23,670 (66.5%)
Rented: 11,945 (33.5%)
Average Value: $226,053

=== Religion ===
Religion** (2001):

Christian: 58,125 (52.8%)

Catholic: 24,660 (22.4%)
Protestant: 19,670 (17.9%)
Christian Orthodox: 7,365 (6.7%)
Christian n.i.e.****: 6,430 (5.8%)

No religious affiliation: 31,220 (28.4%)
Hindu: 7,300 (6.6%)
Muslim: 6,740 (6.1%)
Buddhist: 5,515 (5%)
Eastern religions: 380 (0.3%)
Sikh: 360 (0.3%)
Jewish: 330 (0.3%)
Other religions: 30 (0.03%)

* Based on a total population of 110,670
** Based on a projected population of 109,995 (20% sample data projected from the total population)
*** Based on a projected population of 91,840 (20% sample data projected from the population 15 years and over)
**** Includes mostly answers of 'Christian,' not otherwise stated.

Sources: Statistics Canada (2001, 2006); Elections Canada (2006); Elections Ontario (2007)

== Members of Provincial Parliament ==
Scarborough—Agincourt
Assembly	Years	Member	Party
Riding created from Scarborough North
34th	1987–1990	Gerry Phillips	Liberal
35th	1990–1995	Gerry Phillips	Liberal
36th	1995–1999	Gerry Phillips	Liberal
37th	1999–2003	Gerry Phillips	Liberal
38th	2003–2007	Gerry Phillips	Liberal
39th	2007–2011	Gerry Phillips	Liberal
40th	2011–2014	Soo Wong	Liberal
41st	2014–2018	Soo Wong	Liberal
42nd	2018–2022	Aris Babikian	Progressive Conservative
43rd	2022–2025	Aris Babikian	Progressive Conservative
44th	2025–present	Aris Babikian	Progressive Conservative
Sourced from the Ontario Legislative Assembly.

== Election results ==
Winning party in each polling division of Scarborough—Agincourt at the 2025 Ontario general election

2025 Ontario general election
Party	Candidate	Votes	%	±%
Progressive Conservative	Aris Babikian	13,468	49.39	+0.36
Liberal	Peter Yuen	11,430	41.91	+4.64
New Democratic	Francesca Policarpio	1,368	5.02	–3.76
Green	Stephanie Leblanc	556	2.04	–0.15
New Blue	Johan Yogaretnam	249	0.91	–0.11
Ontario Party	Donahue Morgan	200	0.73	–0.98
Total valid votes		27,271	99.32	
Total rejected, unmarked and declined ballots		188	0.68	+0.13
Turnout		27,459	37.34	–2.08
Eligible voters		73,529		
Progressive Conservative hold		Swing		–2.14
Source: Elections Ontario

Winning party in each polling division of Scarborough—Agincourt at the 2022 Ontario general election

2022 Ontario general election
Party	Candidate	Votes	%	±%	Expenditures
Progressive Conservative	Aris Babikian	14,040	49.03	–1.37	$73,607
Liberal	Soo Wong	10,672	37.27	+8.98	$34,013
New Democratic	Benjamin Lee Truong	2,512	8.77	–8.68	$5,939
Green	Jacqueline Scott	628	2.19	+0.47	$0
Ontario Party	Donny Morgan	492	1.72	–	$8,379
New Blue	Rane Vega	292	1.02	–	$2,200
Total valid votes/expense limit		28,636	99.45	–	$102,205
Total rejected, unmarked and declined ballots		159	0.55	–0.48	
Turnout		28,795	39.43	–11.92	
Eligible voters		73,032			
Progressive Conservative hold		Swing		–5.18	
Source: Elections Ontario

2018 Ontario general election
Party	Candidate	Votes	%	±%
Progressive Conservative	Aris Babikian	18,582	50.40	+15.88
Liberal	Soo Wong	10,429	28.29	–21.44
New Democratic	Tasleem Riaz	6,434	17.45	+5.66
Green	Lydia West	635	1.72	–0.88
Libertarian	Mark Sinclair	244	0.66	–
Independent	Jude Coutinho	189	0.51	–
Moderate	Rubina Ansary	148	0.40	–
Trillium	Carlos Lacuna	118	0.32	–
People's Political Party	Badih Rawdah	92	0.25	
Total valid votes		36,871	98.97	
Total rejected, unmarked and declined ballots		385	1.03	
Turnout		37,256	51.35	+5.31
Eligible voters		72,558		
Progressive Conservative notional gain from Liberal		Swing		+18.66
Source: Elections Ontario

2014 general election redistributed results
Party	Vote	%
Liberal	17,166	49.80
Progressive Conservative	11,941	34.64
New Democratic	4,078	11.83
Green	901	2.61
Others	386	1.12

2014 Ontario general election
Party	Candidate	Votes	%	±%
Liberal	Soo Wong	17,332	49.84	+2.99
Progressive Conservative	Liang Chen	12,041	34.63	+2.50
New Democratic	Alex Wilson	4,105	11.81	–3.96
Green	Pauline Thompson	907	2.61	+0.34
People's Political Party	Kevin Clarke	387	1.11	–
Total valid votes		34,772	98.67	
Total rejected, unmarked and declined ballots		470	1.33	+0.57
Turnout		35,242	46.04	+2.47
Eligible voters		76,549		
Liberal hold		Swing		+0.25
Source: Elections Ontario

2011 Ontario general election
Party	Candidate	Votes	%	±%
Liberal	Soo Wong	14,907	46.85	–11.22
Progressive Conservative	Liang Chen	10,222	32.13	+6.77
New Democratic	Paul Choi	5,017	15.77	+5.27
Green	Pauline Thompson	722	2.27	–2.22
Libertarian	Douglas McLarty	656	2.06	–
Paramount Canadians	Priya Ahuja	209	0.66	–
Freedom	Sabrina Wall	83	0.26	–
Total valid votes		31,816	99.23	
Total rejected, unmarked and declined ballots		246	0.77	–0.44
Turnout		32,062	43.57	–2.44
Eligible voters		73,583		
Liberal hold		Swing		–9.00
Source: Elections Ontario

2007 Ontario general election
Party	Candidate	Votes	%	±%
Liberal	Gerry Phillips	19,541	58.08	–3.02
Progressive Conservative	John Del Grande	8,531	25.36	–4.73
New Democratic	Yvette Blackburn	3,531	10.49	+4.63
Green	George Pappas	1,511	4.49	+2.99
Family Coalition	Max Wang	532	1.58	+0.12
Total valid votes		33,646	98.79	
Total rejected, unmarked and declined ballots		412	1.21	+0.52
Turnout		34,058	46.01	–6.87
Eligible voters		74,026		
Liberal hold		Swing		+0.85
Source: Elections Ontario

2003 Ontario general election
Party	Candidate	Votes	%	±%
Liberal	Gerry Phillips	23,026	61.10	+10.40
Progressive Conservative	Yolanda Chan	11,337	30.08	–13.07
New Democratic	Stacy Douglas	2,209	5.86	+2.29
Green	Lawrence J. Arkilander	566	1.50	+0.28
Family Coalition	Tony Ieraci	550	1.46	–
Total valid votes		37,688	99.31	
Total rejected, unmarked and declined ballots		263	0.69	–0.89
Turnout		37,951	52.88	–3.74
Eligible voters		71,770		
Liberal hold		Swing		+11.73
Source: Elections Ontario

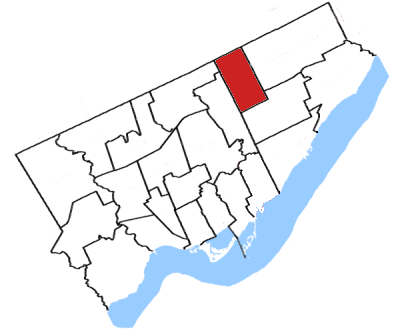
Riding boundaries after 1996 redistribution

1999 Ontario general election
Party	Candidate	Votes	%	±%
Liberal	Gerry Phillips	18,698	50.70	+4.61
Progressive Conservative	Jim Brown	15,915	43.15	+4.37
New Democratic	Bob Frankford	1,319	3.58	–10.49
Green	Gary Carmichael	451	1.22	–
Independent	Wayne Cook	371	1.01	–
Natural Law	Ken Morgan	129	0.35	–0.72
Total valid votes		36,883	98.42	
Total rejected, unmarked and declined ballots		592	1.58	+0.40
Turnout		37,475	56.62	–4.75
Eligible voters		66,186		
Liberal hold		Swing		+0.12
Source: Elections Ontario

1995 Ontario general election
Party	Candidate	Votes	%	±%
Liberal	Gerry Phillips	13,472	46.08	+1.77
Progressive Conservative	Keith MacNab	11,337	38.78	+10.09
New Democratic	Christine Fei	4,112	14.07	–8.39
Natural Law	Daphne Quance	313	1.07	–
Total valid votes		29,234	98.82	
Total rejected, unmarked and declined ballots		348	1.18	–0.28
Turnout		29,582	61.37	–2.17
Eligible voters		48,203		
Liberal hold		Swing		–4.16
Source: Elections Ontario

1990 Ontario general election
Party	Candidate	Votes	%	±%
Liberal	Gerry Phillips	13,347	44.32	–13.22
Progressive Conservative	Keith MacNab	8,640	28.69	+9.76
New Democratic	Ayoub Ali	6,763	22.46	+1.31
Libertarian	Bill Galster	1,368	4.54	+2.15
Total valid votes		30,118	98.54	
Total rejected, unmarked and declined ballots		446	1.46	+0.88
Turnout		30,564	63.54	+0.24
Eligible voters		48,103		
Liberal hold		Swing		–11.49
Source: Elections Ontario

1987 Ontario general election
Party	Candidate	Votes	%
Liberal	Gerry Phillips	19,101	57.53
New Democratic	David Kho	7,021	21.15
Progressive Conservative	Adrienne Johnson	6,284	18.93
Libertarian	Barry Coyne	794	2.39
Total valid votes		33,200	99.42
Total rejected ballots		193	0.58
Turnout		33,393	63.30
Eligible voters		52,754	
Liberal pickup new district.			
Source: Elections Ontario

== 2007 electoral reform referendum ==
2007 Ontario electoral reform referendum
Side	Votes	%
First Past the Post	19,185	59.8
Mixed member proportional	12,881	40.2
Total valid votes	32,066	100.0

== See also ==
- List of Ontario provincial electoral districts
- Canadian provincial electoral districts
