= Roy Cullen =

Canadian politician

The Honourable Roy Cullen PC

Member of Parliament for Etobicoke North
- In office March 25, 1996 – October 14, 2008
- Preceded by: Roy MacLaren
- Succeeded by: Kirsty Duncan

Personal details
- Born: December 30, 1944 (age 81) Montreal, Quebec
- Party: Liberal
- Spouse: Ethne Cullen
- Profession: Chartered accountant

For the Texas businessman, see Hugh Roy Cullen. Roy Cullen, PC (born December 30, 1944, in Montreal, Quebec) is a former politician who was a Liberal MP for the riding of Etobicoke North in the House of Commons of Canada.

== Background ==
Cullen earned his Bachelor of Arts in business administration from Bishop's University and his Master of Public Administration from the University of Victoria. He is a chartered accountant.

Prior to his first election to the House of Commons, Cullen was a vice-president of the Noranda Forest Group and served as an assistant deputy minister in the British Columbia Ministry of Forests. He was very active in the Salvation Army, Rotary International and the United Way.

In 2008, Cullen's book The Poverty of Corrupt Nations was published by Blue Butterfly Book Publishing. In his second book, "Beyond Question Period, or What really goes on in Ottawa", which was published in 2011, he chronicles the life of an MP In Ottawa beyond the rhetoric of the cut and thrust of Question Period.

== Politics ==
He was first elected in a by-election in 1996 and was subsequently re-elected in the 1997 federal elections. He stayed as MP until 2008 when he announced his retirement. He served through four sessions of parliament.

He was elected and served as chair of the Ontario Liberal Caucus from 1998 to 1999. In 1999 he was appointed Parliamentary Secretary to the Minister of Finance, and was re-appointed following the 2000 general election. In February 2004, Cullen was elected chair of the House of Commons Standing Committee on Finance, and on July 20, 2004, Mr. Cullen was appointed parliamentary secretary to the Minister of Public Safety and Emergency Preparedness.

In June 2002, he was appointed to the Prime Minister's Task Force on Canada/U.S. Relations and to the newly formed Standing Committee for Government Operations and Estimates. In December 2002, he was asked to co-chair the Subcommittee on Public Service Renewal. He also chaired the Liberal caucus Sub-Committee on Corporate Governance.

In the leadership contest called to replace Paul Martin as leader of the Liberal Party, he initially supported Maurizio Bevilacqua and subsequently supported Michael Ignatieff when Bevilacqua withdrew from the race.

In opposition, Cullen broke with the Liberal caucus in 2007 to vote with Stephen Harper's Conservative government in favour of extending Canada's NATO-authorized combat mission in the Kandahar province of Afghanistan for two years. In all, 30 Liberal MPs voted with the government which allowed the motion to narrowly pass 149–145. In 2008, Cullen also received publicity for allegedly stating in caucus that he would defy Liberal Party leader Stéphane Dion's whip by voting again with the Conservative Government in further extending the combat mission indefinitely. This report was denied by Cullen. Cullen announced on February 21, 2008, that he would not run in the 2008 general election.
