= Michael Ma =

Canadian politician

Michael Ma MP

Member of Parliament for Markham—Unionville
- Incumbent
- Assumed office April 28, 2025
- Preceded by: Paul Chiang

Personal details
- Born: British Hong Kong
- Party: Liberal (since 2025)
- Other political affiliations: Conservative (until 2025)
- Website: michaelma.libparl.ca

Chinese name
- Traditional Chinese: 馬榮錚
- Simplified Chinese: 马荣铮
Transcriptions
Standard Mandarin
- Hanyu Pinyin: Mǎ Róngzhēng
- Wade–Giles: Ma^{3} Jung^{2}-cheng^{1}

Michael Ma (Chinese: 馬榮錚; pinyin: Mǎ Róngzhēng) is a Canadian politician who has served as a member of Parliament (MP) for Markham—Unionville since 2025. Currently a member of the Liberal Party, Ma was elected in the April 2025 federal election as a Conservative, then moved to the Liberal caucus in December 2025.

== Early life and education ==
Ma was born in British Hong Kong and immigrated to Canada at the age of 12, residing in Vancouver, British Columbia. He completed a BSc in computer science at the University of British Columbia and an MBA from the University of South Australia.

Prior to entering politics, Ma built a career in business and technology, holding senior leadership roles at TD Bank, RBC, Sun Life Financial, American International Group and LifeLabs. He was also involved as a community leader as a board member for Oak Valley Health, the Hong Fook Mental Health Foundation and the Canadian International School of Hong Kong.

== Political career ==
=== 2019 federal election ===
Ma unsuccessfully ran in Don Valley East in the 2019 election as a Conservative, losing to incumbent Liberal MP Yasmin Ratansi.

=== 2025 federal election ===
Ma was appointed as the Conservative Party's candidate in Markham—Unionville on the day the general election was called. He initially ran against incumbent Liberal MP Paul Chiang, who withdrew from the race after suggesting to a media outlet that a political opponent, Joe Tay, could be turned into the Chinese consulate in return for a bounty. Chiang was replaced as the Liberal candidate by Peter Yuen. Ma ultimately defeated Yuen and flipped the seat for the Conservatives.

At the time of the 2025 Canadian federal election, he lived in Toronto.

=== 45th Canadian Parliament ===
On December 11, 2025, Ma crossed the floor to join the governing Liberal caucus, citing the "steady, practical approach" of Prime Minister Mark Carney. At the time, the move put the Liberals within one seat of a majority government. He was the second Conservative MP to cross to the Liberals in the 45th Parliament, after Chris d'Entremont of Acadie—Annapolis crossed the floor in November.

In January 2026, Ma joined Prime Minister Mark Carney on his trip to China and Qatar.

On June 16, 2026, Ma sponsored Petition E-7523, which calls on the House of Commons of Canada to establish a Canadian Chinese Heritage Month "in recognition of the contributions of Chinese Canadians, the hardships that they have faced, and Canada’s constitutional commitment to multiculturalism." He plans to introduce a private member's bill in the fall session recognizing this as such.

==== Controversies ====
On the March 26, 2026, Margaret McCuaig-Johnston, an academic and former civil servant who specialises in Canada–China relations, testified before a meeting of the Industry Committee, which was in the process of investigating the use of forced labour in China. Ma asked McCuaig-Johnston if she had ever personally witnessed the use of forced labour in Shenzhen, and if her testimony on the issue was based on hearsay. McCuaig-Johnston later criticised these questions, saying that Ma was "overall trying to undermine" her testimony. Ma later released a statement condemning "forced labour in all its forms", but declined to speak about China specifically.

== Electoral history ==
2025 Canadian federal election: Markham—Unionville
Party	Candidate	Votes	%	±%	Expenditures
Conservative	Michael Ma	27,055	50.65	+8.22	
Liberal	Peter Yuen	25,133	47.05	–1.18	
New Democratic	Sameer Qureshi	723	1.35	–5.20	
Green	Elvin Kao	506	0.95	–1.84	
Total valid votes/expense limit					
Total rejected ballots					
Turnout		53,417	64.13		
Eligible voters		83,289			
Conservative notional gain from Liberal		Swing		+4.70	
Source: Elections Canada

2019 Canadian federal election: Don Valley East
Party	Candidate	Votes	%	±%	Expenditures
Liberal	Yasmin Ratansi	25,295	59.81	+1.98	$74,656.45
Conservative	Michael Ma	10,115	23.92	-5.31	$66,318.23
New Democratic	Nicholas Thompson	4,647	10.99	+0.63	none listed
Green	Dan Turcotte	1,675	3.96	+1.37	$3,743.20
People's	John P. Hendry	562	1.33	-	none listed
Total valid votes/expense limit		42,294	99.98		
Total rejected ballots		438	1.02	+0.41	
Turnout		42,732	64.23	-1.31	
Eligible voters		66,530			
Liberal hold		Swing		+3.65	
Source: Elections Canada
