= John Zerucelli =

Canadian politician

The Honourable John Zerucelli PC MP

Secretary of State (Labour)
- Incumbent
- Assumed office May 13, 2025
- Prime Minister: Mark Carney
- Preceded by: position established

Member of Parliament for Etobicoke North
- Incumbent
- Assumed office April 28, 2025
- Preceded by: Kirsty Duncan

Personal details
- Born: Rexdale, Ontario, Canada
- Party: Liberal
- Website: johnzerucelli.liberal.ca

John Zerucelli PC MP is the Member of Parliament for Etobicoke North and currently serves as Secretary of State for Labour. A trained lawyer specializing in dispute resolution. Prior to entering politics, he held executive roles in the private sector, including positions at Labatt Brewing Company and Universal Music Canada.

Born and raised in Rexdale, Zerucelli has been active in politics since Prime Minister Jean Chrétien, participating in both provincial and federal campaigns.

== Electoral record ==
2025 Canadian federal election: Etobicoke North
Party	Candidate	Votes	%	±%	Expenditures
Liberal	John Zerucelli	22,270	52.6	–6.28	
Conservative	Natalie Weed	17,359	41.0	+15.52	
New Democratic	Benjamin Abis	1,354	3.2	–7.34	
People's	Andy D'Andrea	846	2.0	–2.34	
Green	Sarun Balaranjan	394	0.9	N/A	
Independent	Neil Simon	132	0.3	N/A	
Total valid votes/expense limit		42,355	99.3		
Total rejected ballots		304	0.7		
Turnout		42,659	56.4	+6.2	
Eligible voters		75,650			
Liberal hold		Swing		–10.90	
Source: Elections Canada
