= Aris Babikian =

Canadian politician

Aris Babikian MPP
- Արիս Պապիկեան
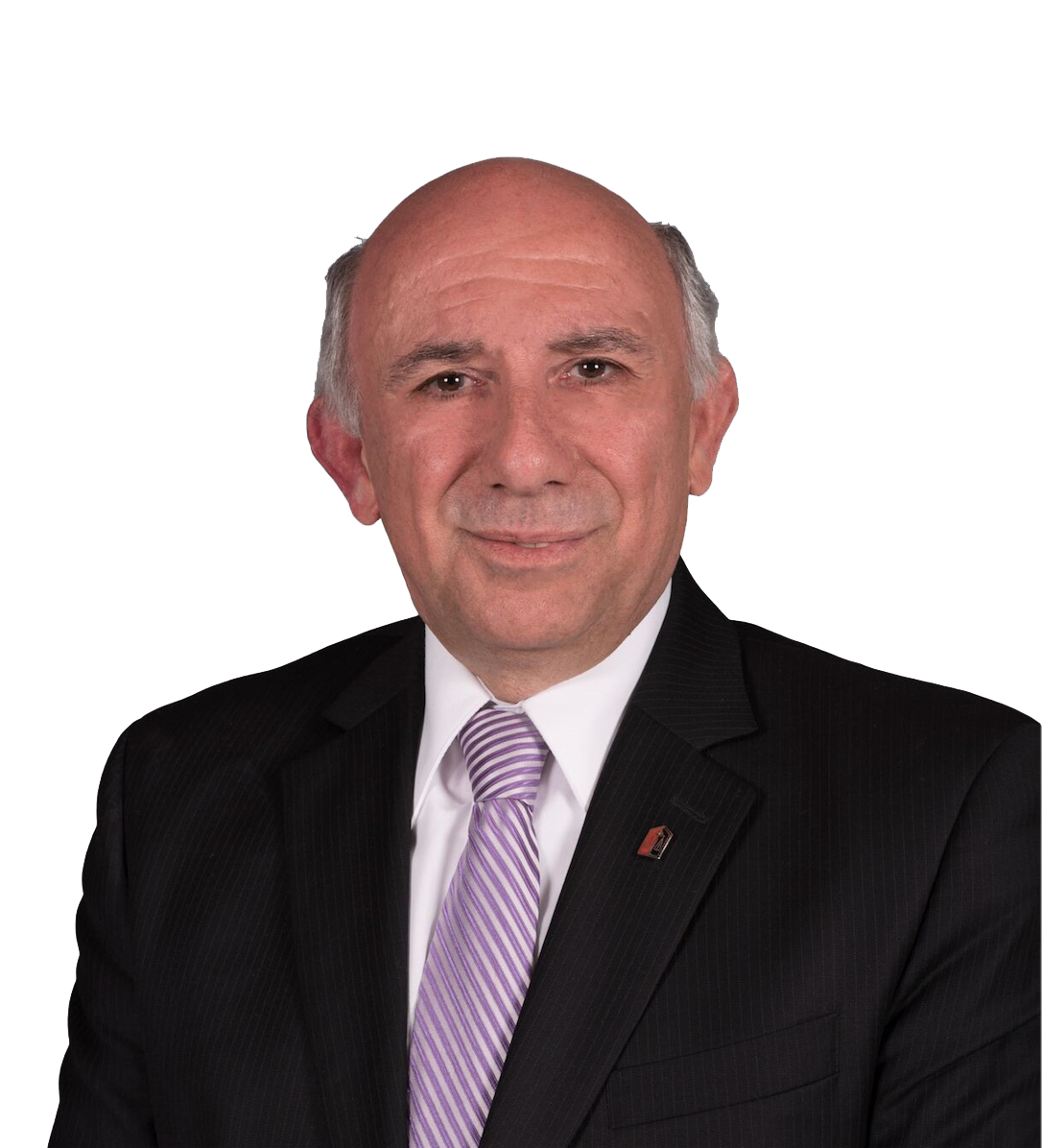
- Babikian in 2018

Member of the Ontario Provincial Parliament for Scarborough—Agincourt
- Incumbent
- Assumed office June 7, 2018
- Preceded by: Soo Wong

Personal details
- Born: 1953 or 1954 (age 72–73)
- Party: Progressive Conservative Party of Ontario
- Occupation: citizenship judge

Aris Babikian MPP (Armenian: Արիս Պապիկեան) is a Canadian politician. A member of the Progressive Conservative Party of Ontario, he has represented the riding of Scarborough—Agincourt in the Legislative Assembly of Ontario since 2018.

== Biography ==
Babikian grew up in Aleppo, Syria, then lived in Beirut, Lebanon. He relocated to Canada in 1978 during the Lebanese Civil War, and has lived in Scarborough—Agincourt since 1991. He had served as citizenship and immigration advisor to the Armenian Community Centre in Toronto, and as president of the Armenian National Federation of Canada. He was first appointed as a citizenship judge in 2009, and served a second term from 2012 to 2015.

He ran in the 2018 provincial election as the Progressive Conservative candidate in Scarborough—Agincourt, and was elected to the Ontario Legislature by winning just over 50% of the vote, defeating the incumbent Liberal candidate Soo Wong and breaking 30 years of Liberal representation in the riding. He also became the first Canadian of Armenian descent elected to the Ontario Legislature. In the 42nd Parliament he served as vice-chair of the standing committees on Justice Policy, Social Policy, and Government Agencies, and chair of the standing committee on Regulations and Private Bills.

He faced Soo Wong again in the 2022 provincial election, this time defeating her by a narrower margin to be re-elected in Scarborough—Agincourt; he chaired the standing committee on the Interior in the 43rd Parliament. He defeated Liberal candidate Peter Yuen in the 2025 election, and was named parliamentary assistant to the Minister of Citizenship and Multiculturalism.

== Electoral record ==
2025 Ontario general election: Scarborough—Agincourt
| Party | Candidate | Votes | % | ±% |
|---|---|---|---|---|
| Progressive Conservative | Aris Babikian | 13,468 | 49.39 | +0.36 |
| Liberal | Peter Yuen | 11,430 | 41.91 | +4.64 |
| New Democratic | Francesca Policarpio | 1,368 | 5.02 | –3.76 |
| Green | Stephanie Leblanc | 556 | 2.04 | –0.15 |
| New Blue | Johan Yogaretnam | 249 | 0.91 | –0.11 |
| Ontario Party | Donahue Morgan | 200 | 0.73 | –0.98 |
| Total valid votes | | 27,271 | 99.32 | |
| Total rejected, unmarked and declined ballots | | 188 | 0.68 | +0.13 |
| Turnout | | 27,459 | 37.34 | –2.08 |
| Eligible voters | | 73,529 | | |
| Progressive Conservative hold | | Swing | | –2.14 |
Source: Elections Ontario

2022 Ontario general election: Scarborough—Agincourt
| Party | Candidate | Votes | % | ±% | Expenditures |
|---|---|---|---|---|---|
| Progressive Conservative | Aris Babikian | 14,040 | 49.03 | –1.37 | $73,607 |
| Liberal | Soo Wong | 10,672 | 37.27 | +8.98 | $34,013 |
| New Democratic | Benjamin Lee Truong | 2,512 | 8.77 | –8.68 | $5,939 |
| Green | Jacqueline Scott | 628 | 2.19 | +0.47 | $0 |
| Ontario Party | Donny Morgan | 492 | 1.72 | – | $8,379 |
| New Blue | Rane Vega | 292 | 1.02 | – | $2,200 |
| Total valid votes/expense limit | | 28,636 | 99.45 | – | $102,205 |
| Total rejected, unmarked and declined ballots | | 159 | 0.55 | –0.48 | |
| Turnout | | 28,795 | 39.43 | –11.92 | |
| Eligible voters | | 73,032 | | | |
| Progressive Conservative hold | | Swing | | –5.18 | |
Source: Elections Ontario

2018 Ontario general election: Scarborough—Agincourt
| Party | Candidate | Votes | % | ±% |
|---|---|---|---|---|
| Progressive Conservative | Aris Babikian | 18,582 | 50.40 | +15.88 |
| Liberal | Soo Wong | 10,429 | 28.29 | –21.44 |
| New Democratic | Tasleem Riaz | 6,434 | 17.45 | +5.66 |
| Green | Lydia West | 635 | 1.72 | –0.88 |
| Libertarian | Mark Sinclair | 244 | 0.66 | – |
| Independent | Jude Coutinho | 189 | 0.51 | – |
| Moderate | Rubina Ansary | 148 | 0.40 | – |
| Trillium | Carlos Lacuna | 118 | 0.32 | – |
| People's Political Party | Badih Rawdah | 92 | 0.25 | |
| Total valid votes | | 36,871 | 98.97 | |
| Total rejected, unmarked and declined ballots | | 385 | 1.03 | |
| Turnout | | 37,256 | 51.35 | +5.31 |
| Eligible voters | | 72,558 | | |
| Progressive Conservative notional gain from Liberal | | Swing | | +18.66 |
Source: Elections Ontario
