= Paul Chiang (politician) =

Canadian politician (born 1960)

- 蒋振宇

Member of Parliament for Markham—Unionville
- In office September 20, 2021 – March 23, 2025
- Preceded by: Bob Saroya
- Succeeded by: Michael Ma

Personal details
- Born: 1960 (age 65–66) Karachi, Pakistan
- Party: Liberal
- Spouse: Monica
- Children: 3
- Profession: Police sergeant (retired)
- Police career
- Department: London Police Service; Durham Regional Police; York Regional Police
- Service years: 1992－2020
- Status: Retired
- Rank: Sergeant

Paul Chin-Yue Chiang (born 1960) is a Canadian politician who served as member of Parliament (MP) for the Ontario riding of Markham—Unionville from 2021 to 2025 as a member of the Liberal Party of Canada. He withdrew during the 2025 federal election campaign after controversial comments surfaced.

== Background and policing career ==
Born in Karachi, Pakistan to Chinese parents, he grew up in Pakistan until his family immigrated to Canada in 1976 to join his father's family. His grandparents had lived in Karachi since 1927. He is married to Monica, who is also of Chinese descent and born in Pakistan (Rawalpindi); they have three children. In addition to Hakka Chinese, Mandarin, Cantonese, Hubei and English, Chiang is also fluent in Urdu, Punjabi and knows Pashto from his early years in Pakistan.

Chiang first entered policing with the London Police Service in 1992, and served with the Durham Regional Police before joining York Regional Police (YRP) in 1999, serving as diversity officer in YRP's Diversity and Cultural Resources Unit as of 2013. He retired from YRP in 2020 as a sergeant.

== Politics ==
In the 2021 Canadian federal election, Chiang ran as the Liberal candidate in Markham—Unionville, and defeated the incumbent Conservative candidate Bob Saroya to be elected to the House of Commons. He served as parliamentary secretary to the Minister of Diversity and Inclusion from 2021 to 2023, and parliamentary secretary to the Minister of Immigration, Refugees and Citizenship from 2023 to 2025.

In 2022, Chiang introduced an amendment to Bill C-21, a gun control bill that drew condemnation from opposition MPs who said the amendments criminalized many firearms used by hunters including hunting rifles and shotguns.

During the 2025 federal election, it was revealed that Chiang remarked at a Chinese-language media news conference in January that Joe Tay, who was then seeking the Conservative nomination in Markham—Unionville, should be reported to the Toronto Chinese Consulate in exchange for a 1 million HKD bounty that was placed by the Hong Kong police. Chiang later apologized for the comments by calling them "deplorable." He also issued another statement saying it should never happen again and that he reached to Tay for a personal apology; Tay rejected Chiang's apology stating it was insufficient. Liberal Party Leader and Prime Minister Mark Carney accepted Chiang's apology and allowed him to continue being a Liberal candidate, calling Chiang's comments towards Tay a "terrible lapse of judgement" but viewed the apology as a "teachable moment." The Royal Canadian Mounted Police later opened an investigation to see if Chiang's comment broke the law after Hong Kong Watch filed a complaint. On March 31, 2025, Chiang announced that he would be withdrawing from the 2025 election. He was replaced by Peter Yuen who was defeated by Conservative candidate Michael Ma in the election.

In the 2026 York Regional Council election, Chiang ran for one of four regional councillor positions for the City of Markham; he placed seventh and was not elected.

== Election results ==
2021 Canadian federal election: Markham—Unionville
Party	Candidate	Votes	%	±%	Expenditures
Liberal	Paul Chiang	21,958	48.6	+10.24	$110,433.44
Conservative	Bob Saroya	18,959	41.9	-7.04	$99,523.48
New Democratic	Aftab Qureshi	3,001	6.6	—	$7,138.72
Green	Elvin Kao	1,306	2.9	-1.56	$3,056.16
Total valid votes/expense limit		45,224	–	–	$116,665.09
Total rejected ballots		452			
Turnout		45,676	52.0	-8.9	
Eligible voters		87,781			
Liberal gain from Conservative		Swing		+8.64	
Source: Elections Canada
