= Bob Saroya =

Canadian politician (born 1952)

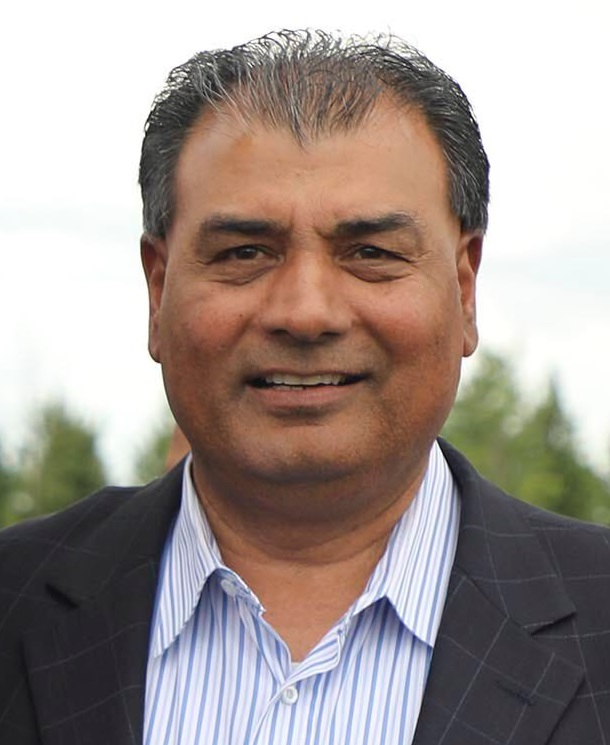
- Saroya in 2017

Member of Parliament
- In office October 19, 2015 – September 20, 2021
- Preceded by: John McCallum
- Succeeded by: Paul Chiang
- Constituency: Markham—Unionville

Personal details
- Born: Babar Saroya; February 3, 1952 (age 74) Punjab, India
- Party: Conservative
- Spouse: Roopa Saroya
- Children: 3
- Education: University of Delhi (BA)
- Occupation: Politician, businessman

Babar Saroya (born February 3, 1952) is a former Canadian politician, who served as the Member of Parliament for the riding of Markham—Unionville in the House of Commons of Canada from 2015 to 2021.

== Background ==
Saroya immigrated to Canada from India in 1974. He eventually went on to own several restaurants and became a sales director with Pizza Pizza before first running for office in 2008.

== Political career ==
Saroya ran unsuccessfully for the House of Commons of Canada in 2008 and 2011, contesting the ridings of Etobicoke North and Markham—Unionville, respectively.

In the 2015 Canadian federal election, Saroya was elected as Member of Parliament for the riding of Markham—Unionville. His election was unique because he was the only candidate in Canada to pick up a seat from the Liberals, who had won a majority government in that election.

During the 42nd Canadian Parliament, Saroya sponsored one private member bill, C-338, An Act to amend the Controlled Drugs and Substances Act (punishment), which would have increased mandatory minimum sentences for those convicted of importing controlled drugs and substances. The bill was debated at second reading but was defeated by the Liberals; only members from the Conservative Party voted in favour.

In 2018, Saroya sparked controversy when it was revealed that he took a free 8-day trip to Beijing to get a letter to the then-Tory leader Andrew Scheer delivered and to make the leader’s travel to Beijing happen as soon as possible.

Saroya was re-elected in the 2019 Canadian federal election. During the ensuing 43rd Canadian Parliament he introduced one private member bill, Bill C-238, An Act to amend the Criminal Code (possession of unlawfully imported firearms) which sought to increase the minimum mandatory sentence from one year to five years imprisonment for the offense of possession of a firearm known to be illegally imported to Canada. It was brought to a vote on January 27, 2021, but defeated with NDP and Liberal Party members voting in against.

In the 2021 Canadian federal election, Saroya narrowly lost his seat to Liberal candidate Paul Chiang.

In 2024, it was announced that Saroya was seeking the Conservative nomination for Markham—Unionville in the 2025 Canadian federal election. However, Michael Ma was nominated instead.

=== Endorsements ===
In the 2020 Conservative Party of Canada leadership election he endorsed Peter MacKay. MacKay would go on to lose to Erin O'Toole, who won the leadership of the party on the third ballot.

In the 2022 Conservative Party of Canada leadership election, he endorsed Pierre Poilievre. Poilievre would go on to win the leadership of the Conservative Party on the first ballot, with 70.70% of total votes.

== Electoral record ==
2021 Canadian federal election: Markham—Unionville
Party	Candidate	Votes	%	±%	Expenditures
Liberal	Paul Chiang	21,958	48.6	+10.24	$110,433.44
Conservative	Bob Saroya	18,959	41.9	-7.04	$99,523.48
New Democratic	Aftab Qureshi	3,001	6.6	—	$7,138.72
Green	Elvin Kao	1,306	2.9	-1.56	$3,056.16
Total valid votes/expense limit		45,224	–	–	$116,665.09
Total rejected ballots		452			
Turnout		45,676	52.0	-8.9	
Eligible voters		87,781			
Liberal gain from Conservative		Swing		+8.64	
Source: Elections Canada

2019 Canadian federal election: Markham—Unionville
Party	Candidate	Votes	%	±%	Expenditures
Conservative	Bob Saroya	26,133	48.94	-0.43	$105,729.16
Liberal	Alan Ho	20,484	38.36	-4.97	$111,317.79
New Democratic	Gregory Hines	3,524	6.60	+1.53	none listed
Green	Elvin Kao	2,394	4.48	+2.25	$5,836.95
People's	Sarah Chung	861	1.61	–	none listed
Total valid votes/expense limit		53,396	100.0	–	
Total rejected ballots		523	0.97	–	
Turnout		53,919	60.90	+0.22	
Eligible voters		88,538			
Conservative hold		Swing		+2.27	
Source: Elections Canada

2015 Canadian federal election: Markham—Unionville
Party	Candidate	Votes	%	±%	Expenditures
Conservative	Bob Saroya	24,605	49.37	+3.54	$148,191.54
Liberal	Bang-Gu Jiang	21,596	43.33	+9.64	$105,134.99
New Democratic	Colleen Zimmerman	2,528	5.07	-11.45	$3,111.82
Green	Elvin Kao	1,110	2.23	-0.77	$4,322.49
Total valid votes/Expense limit		49,839	100.00		$218,774.36
Total rejected ballots		246	0.49		
Turnout		50,085	60.68		
Eligible voters		82,534			
Conservative notional hold		Swing		-3.05	
Source: Elections Canada

2011 Canadian federal election: Markham—Unionville
Party	Candidate	Votes	%	±%	Expenditures
Liberal	John McCallum	19,429	38.9	-16.0	
Conservative	Bob Saroya	17,734	35.5	+5.3	
New Democratic	Nadine Hawkins	10,897	21.8	+11.6	
Green	Adam Poon	1,597	3.2	-1.0	
Libertarian	Allen Small	231	0.5	–	
Total valid votes		49,888	100.0		
Total rejected ballots		290	0.6	–	
Turnout		50,178	55.1	+2.8	
Eligible voters		91,057	–	–	

2008 Canadian federal election: Etobicoke North
Party	Candidate	Votes	%	±%	Expenditures
Liberal	Kirsty Duncan	15,244	48.6	-13.0	$54,827
Conservative	Bob Saroya	9,436	30.1	+7.8	$64,024
New Democratic	Ali Naqvi	4,940	15.7	+5.1	$35,653
Green	Nigel Barriffe	1,460	4.7	+2.1	$2,242
Marxist–Leninist	Anna Di Carlo	300	1.0	+0.4	
Total valid votes/expense limit		31,380	100.0		$79,011
Total rejected ballots		214	0.68		
Turnout		31,594			
Liberal hold		Swing		-10.4	
Source: Elections Canada
