= Etobicoke North (federal electoral district) =

Federal electoral district in Ontario, Canada

Coordinates: 43.7392°N 79.5815°W

Ontario electoral district
- Interactive map of riding boundaries from the 2025 federal election

Federal electoral district
- Legislature: House of Commons
MP
John Zerucelli
Liberal
- District created: 1976
- First contested: 1979
- Last contested: 2025
- District webpage: profile, map

Demographics
- Population (2021): 116,003
- Electors (2015): 67,544
- Area (km²): 51
- Pop. density (per km²): 2,274.6
- Census division: Toronto
- Census subdivision: Toronto (part)

Etobicoke North (French: Etobicoke-Nord) is a federal electoral district in Toronto, Ontario, Canada, that has been represented in the House of Commons of Canada since 1979. It covers the neighbourhood of Rexdale, in the northern part of the Etobicoke district of Toronto.

The riding was created in 1976 from parts of Etobicoke and York West. In the House of Commons, the riding has been represented by Liberal John Zerucelli since 2025.

== Geography ==
The riding consists of the northwestern part of the City of Toronto. The eastern boundary is the Humber River East Branch and the Humber River from Steeles Avenue West south to a point just to the east of the Dixon Road. The southern boundary runs west from the Humber River along Dixon Road to Martin Grove Road to Eglinton Avenue to the western limit of the city. The western and northern limits of the ridings are formed by the city limits.

In addition to Rexdale, the riding also contains the neighbourhoods of The Elms, Humberwood, Kingsview Village, Thistletown, and Willowridge.

This riding gained territory from Etobicoke Centre during the 2012 electoral redistribution.

Following the 2022 Canadian federal electoral redistribution, the riding will lose Humber Heights-Westmount to York South—Weston—Etobicoke. This change will come into effect upon the calling of the 2025 Canadian federal election.

=== Former boundaries ===
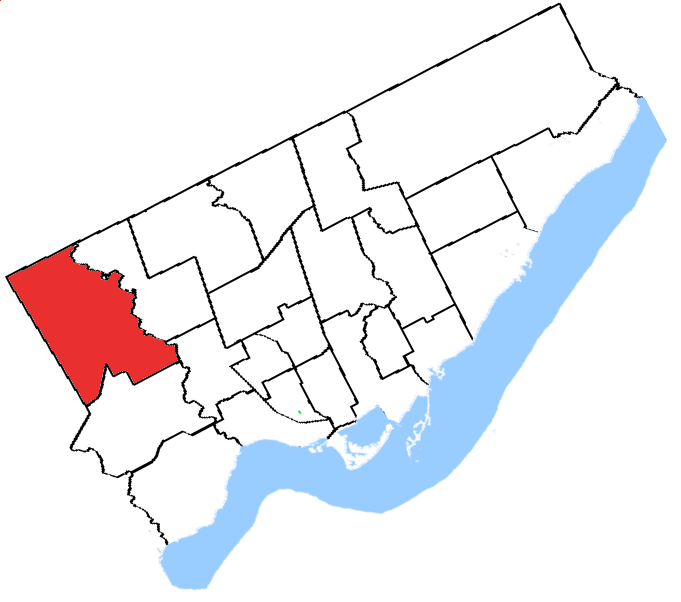
1976 to 1987

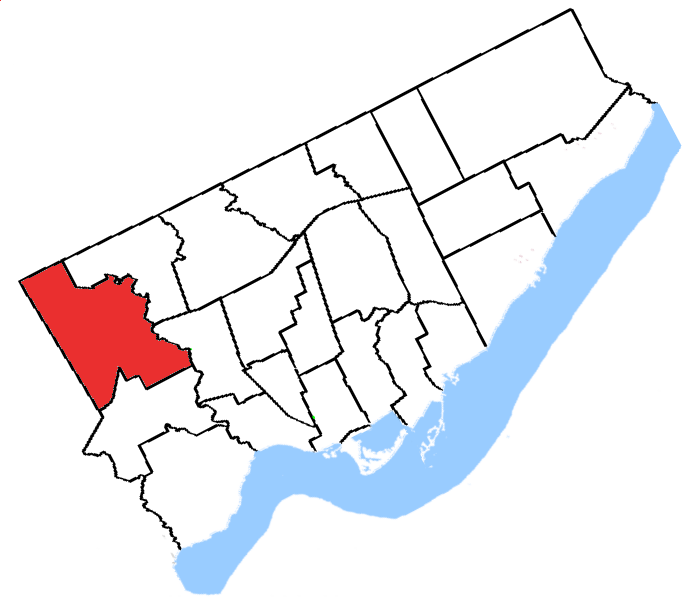
1987 to 1996

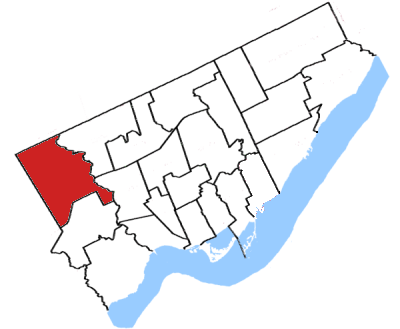
1996 to 2003

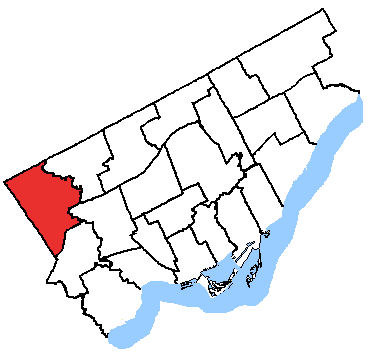
2003 to 2015

== Demographics ==
The population of Etobicoke North, indicated by the 2021 census, was of 116,003 people.

According to the 2011 census, Etobicoke North has a population of 56,625, an increase of 3.6% between 2006 and 2011. 47% of families are couples with children, while 28% of families are couple without children, and 25% are Lone-parent families. The most common structures of occupied private dwellings are single-detached houses at 39.5%, and Apartment buildings that have 5 or more storeys at 36.1%.

The 2011 National Household Survey addressed households, immigration/migration, ethnocultural, education, labour force, and income/shelter factors. In terms of immigration, 54% of Etobicoke North residents are 1st generation, 30.9% are 2nd generation, and 14.6% are third generation Canadian or over. There were large waves of immigration to the area between 1991 and 2011, consisting of a total of 16,560 people. The largest number of immigrants to the area were born in India at 8.7%, followed by South America, Jamaica, Pakistan, Philippines, Italy, Guyana, Poland, United Kingdom, Sri Lanka, and Vietnam. The majority of recent immigrants residing in Etobicoke North were born in India, and 57.7% of the population are visible minorities.

The top Mother tongue is English, followed by Punjabi, then Gujarati. 4.0% of the population has no knowledge of English or French.

While 75% of residents of Etobicoke North have obtained a certificate, diploma, or degree, 25% of the population hold no certificate, diploma, or degree.

The average household income in 2010 was $72,100, and the average individual income was $32,995, with an unemployment rate of 10.0%.

According to the 2021 Canadian census

Languages: 44.4% English, 7.0% Punjabi, 4.3% Gujarati, 4.0% Spanish, 2.7% Somali, 2.7% Italian, 2.4% Tagalog, 2.3% Urdu, 2.1% Assyrian, 1.7% Tamil, 1.6% Arabic, 1.5% Hindi, 1.0% Vietnamese, 1.0% Portuguese

Religions: 50.3% Christian (24.4% Catholic, 2.8% Pentecostal, 1.9% Christian Orthodox, 1.4% Anglican, 1.1% Baptist, 18.7% Other), 14.9% Muslim, 14.3% Hindu, 7.0% Sikh, 1.6% Buddhist, 11.3% None

Median income: $32,400 (2020)

Average income: $39,760 (2020)

Panethnic groups in Etobicoke North (2011−2021)
Panethnic group	2021		2016		2011	
Panethnic group	Pop.	%	Pop.	%	Pop.	%
South Asian	32,480	28.21%	33,825	28.92%	34,910	30.07%
African	27,635	24.01%	27,370	23.4%	24,630	21.22%
European (Note: Statistic includes all persons that did not make up part of a visible minority or an indigenous identity.)	24,390	21.19%	27,875	23.83%	30,855	26.58%
Southeast Asian (Note: Statistic includes total responses of "Filipino" and "Southeast Asian" under visible minority section on census.)	7,685	6.68%	6,470	5.53%	6,495	5.59%
Middle Eastern (Note: Statistic includes total responses of "West Asian" and "Arab" under visible minority section on census.)	6,685	5.81%	6,500	5.56%	5,020	4.32%
Latin American	6,270	5.45%	5,600	4.79%	4,935	4.25%
East Asian (Note: Statistic includes total responses of "Chinese", "Korean", and "Japanese" under visible minority section on census.)	2,055	1.79%	2,270	1.94%	2,510	2.16%
Indigenous	595	0.52%	590	0.5%	760	0.65%
Other/multiracial (Note: Statistic includes total responses of "Visible minority, n.i.e." and "Multiple visible minorities" under visible minority section on census.)	7,325	6.36%	6,470	5.53%	5,985	5.16%
Total responses	115,120	99.24%	116,960	99.09%	116,090	98.72%
Total population	116,003	100%	118,040	100%	117,601	100%
Notes: Totals greater than 100% due to multiple origin responses. Demographics based on 2012 Canadian federal electoral redistribution riding boundaries.

== Members of Parliament ==
This riding has elected the following members of Parliament:

Parliament	Years	Member	Party
Etobicoke North; Riding created from Etobicoke and York West
31st	1979–1980	Roy MacLaren	Liberal
32nd	1980–1984	Roy MacLaren	Liberal
33rd	1984–1988	Robert Pennock	Progressive Conservative
34th	1988–1993	Roy MacLaren	Liberal
35th	1993–1996	Roy MacLaren	Liberal
35th	1996–1997	Roy Cullen	Liberal
36th	1997–2000	Roy Cullen	Liberal
37th	2000–2004	Roy Cullen	Liberal
38th	2004–2006	Roy Cullen	Liberal
39th	2006–2008	Roy Cullen	Liberal
40th	2008–2011	Kirsty Duncan	Liberal
41st	2011–2015	Kirsty Duncan	Liberal
42nd	2015–2019	Kirsty Duncan	Liberal
43rd	2019–2021	Kirsty Duncan	Liberal
44th	2021–2025	Kirsty Duncan	Liberal
45th	2025–present	John Zerucelli	Liberal

== Election results ==
View source data.
Graph of election results in Etobicoke North (minor parties that never got 2% of the vote or didn't run consistently are omitted)

2025 Canadian federal election
Party	Candidate	Votes	%	±%	Expenditures
Liberal	John Zerucelli	22,270	52.6	–6.28	
Conservative	Natalie Weed	17,359	41.0	+15.52	
New Democratic	Benjamin Abis	1,354	3.2	–7.34	
People's	Andy D'Andrea	846	2.0	–2.34	
Green	Sarun Balaranjan	394	0.9	N/A	
Independent	Neil Simon	132	0.3	N/A	
Total valid votes/expense limit		42,355	99.3		
Total rejected ballots		304	0.7		
Turnout		42,659	56.4	+6.2	
Eligible voters		75,650			
Liberal hold		Swing		–10.90	
Source: Elections Canada

2021 federal election redistributed results
Party	Vote	%
Liberal	21,566	58.88
Conservative	9,317	25.44
New Democratic	3,862	10.54
People's	1,591	4.34
Others	292	0.80

2021 Canadian federal election
Party	Candidate	Votes	%	±%	Expenditures
Liberal	Kirsty Duncan	21,201	59.6	-1.8	$71,639.16
Conservative	Priti Lamba	8,866	24.9	+2.7	$81,543.28
New Democratic	Cecil Peter	3,708	10.4	-0.4	none listed
People's	Jim Boutsikakis	1,473	4.1	+1.3	$0.00
Independent	Carol Royer	316	0.9	–	$7,250.71
Total valid votes/expense limit		35,564	–	–	$107,272.58
Total rejected ballots		494			
Turnout		36,058	50.2		
Eligible voters		71,876			
Source: Elections Canada

2019 Canadian federal election
Party	Candidate	Votes	%	±%	Expenditures
Liberal	Kirsty Duncan	26,388	61.4	-1.01	$67,270.39
Conservative	Sarabjit Kaur	9,524	22.2	-0.80	none listed
New Democratic	Naiima Farah	4,654	10.8	-1.61	none listed
People's	Renata Ford	1,196	2.8	-	none listed
Green	Nancy Ghuman	1,080	2.5	+1.25	none listed
Canada's Fourth Front	Sudhir Mehta	104	0.2	-	$0.00
Total valid votes/expense limit		42,946	100.0		
Total rejected ballots		565			
Turnout		43,511	58.8		
Eligible voters		73,970			
Liberal hold		Swing		-0.11	
Source: Elections Canada

2015 Canadian federal election
Party	Candidate	Votes	%	±%	Expenditures
Liberal	Kirsty Duncan	26,251	62.41	+19.84	$69,670.96
Conservative	Toyin Dada	9,673	23.00	-8.96	$60,237.66
New Democratic	Faisal Hassan	5,220	12.41	-11.21	$37,513.09
Green	Akhtar Ayub	524	1.25	+1.08	$1,558.16
Marxist–Leninist	Anna Di Carlo	232	0.55		–
No affiliation	George Szebik	164	0.39	–	–
Total valid votes/expense limit		42,064	100.00		$201,932.10
Total rejected ballots		257	0.61	–	
Turnout		42,321	62.18	–	
Eligible voters		68,063			
Liberal hold		Swing		+14.40	
Source: Elections Canada

2011 federal election redistributed results
Party	Vote	%
Liberal	14,929	42.57
Conservative	11,208	31.96
New Democratic	8,283	23.62
Others	594	1.69
Green	59	0.17

2011 Canadian federal election
Party	Candidate	Votes	%	±%	Expenditures
Liberal	Kirsty Duncan	13,665	42.4	-6.2	
Conservative	Priti Lamba	10,357	32.1	+2.0	
New Democratic	Diana Andrews	7,630	23.7	+8.0	
Libertarian	Alex Dvornyak	208	0.7	-4.1	
Marxist–Leninist	Anna Di Carlo	189	0.6	-0.4	
Christian Heritage	John C. Gardner	186	0.6	–	
Total valid votes		32,235	100.0		
Total rejected ballots		279	0.9	+0.2	
Turnout		32,514	52.5		
Eligible voters		61,930	–	–	
Liberal hold		Swing		-4.1	
Source: Elections Canada

2008 Canadian federal election
Party	Candidate	Votes	%	±%	Expenditures
Liberal	Kirsty Duncan	15,244	48.6	-13.0	$54,827
Conservative	Bob Saroya	9,436	30.1	+7.8	$64,024
New Democratic	Ali Naqvi	4,940	15.7	+5.1	$35,653
Green	Nigel Barriffe	1,460	4.7	+2.1	$2,242
Marxist–Leninist	Anna Di Carlo	300	1.0	+0.4	
Total valid votes/expense limit		31,380	100.0		$79,011
Total rejected ballots		214	0.68		
Turnout		31,594			
Liberal hold		Swing		-10.4	
Source: Elections Canada

2006 Canadian federal election
Party	Candidate	Votes	%	±%
Liberal	Roy Cullen	22,195	61.6	-1.7
Conservative	Amanjit Khroad	8,049	22.3	+3.6
New Democratic	Ali Naqvi	3,820	10.6	-1.6
Green	Jan Havlovic	950	2.6	+0.6
Progressive Canadian	Alexander T. Bussmann	526	1.5	
Independent	George Szebik	273	0.8	-0.2
Marxist–Leninist	Anna Di Carlo	205	0.6	0.0
Total number of valid votes		36,018	100.0	
Rejected ballots		246		
Total number of votes		36,264		

Note: Conservative vote is compared to the total of the Canadian Alliance vote and Progressive Conservative vote in 2000 election.

2004 Canadian federal election
Party	Candidate	Votes	%	±%
Liberal	Roy Cullen	19,450	63.3	-9.3
Conservative	Rupinder Nannar	5,737	18.7	-0.8
New Democratic	Cesar Martello	3,761	12.2	+5.4
Christian Heritage	William Ubbens	661	2.2	
Green	Mir Kamal	605	2.0	
Independent	George Szebik	309	1.0	
Marxist–Leninist	Anna Di Carlo	195	0.6	
Total number of valid votes		30,718	100.0	

2000 Canadian federal election
Party	Candidate	Votes	%	±%
Liberal	Roy Cullen	23,335	72.6	+10.7
Alliance	Mahmood Elahi	6,273	19.5	+3.9
New Democratic	Ana Maria Sapp	2,200	6.8	-2.5
Communist	Elizabeth Rowley	347	1.1	
Total valid votes		32,155	100.0	

Note: Canadian Alliance vote is compared to the Reform vote in 1997 election.

1997 Canadian federal election
Party	Candidate	Votes	%	±%
Liberal	Roy Cullen	22,236	61.8	+15.5
Reform	Mario Luciani	5,597	15.6	-20.5
Progressive Conservative	Sam Basran	4,276	11.9	+1.3
New Democratic	Carmela Casso	3,350	9.3	+4.0
Natural Law	Marilyn Pepper	174	0.5	
Marxist–Leninist	Mag Carson	168	0.5	
Canadian Action	Paul Schiwkow	156	0.4	
Total valid votes		35,957	100.0	

By-election on March 25, 1996
Party	Candidate	Votes	%	±%
Liberal	Roy Cullen	12,290	46.3	-9.3
Reform	Joe Peschisolido	9,563	36.0	+17.2
Progressive Conservative	Mario Annecchini	2,812	10.6	-8.2
New Democratic	Maxine Caron	1,400	5.3	+1.6
Christian Heritage	Ron Gray	284	1.1	
Abolitionist	John Turmel	104	0.4	
Independent	Sylvie Charbin	96	0.4	
Total valid votes		26,549	100.0	

1993 Canadian federal election
Party	Candidate	Votes	%	±%
Liberal	Roy MacLaren	28,015	55.6	+10.3
Reform	Joe Peschisolido	9,470	18.8	
Progressive Conservative	Jane MacLaren	9,470	18.8	-15.8
New Democratic	Carmela Sasso	1,839	3.7	-13.7
National	Emanuele Danelon	661	1.3	
Libertarian	Daniel Hunt	363	0.7	-0.2
Natural Law	Marilyn Pepper	353	0.7	
Independent	Antonio De Felice	105	0.2	
Marxist–Leninist	David Greig	104	0.2	+0.1
Total valid votes		50,380	100.0	

1988 Canadian federal election
Party	Candidate	Votes	%	±%
Liberal	Roy MacLaren	22,618	45.3	+6.4
Progressive Conservative	Bob Pennock	17,261	34.6	-5.9
New Democratic	Ted Humphreys	8,645	17.3	-2.5
Christian Heritage	William Ubbens	849	1.7	
Libertarian	Michael Beech	452	0.9	+0.2
Independent	Gurdev Singh	75	0.2	
Total valid votes		49,900	100.0	

1984 Canadian federal election
Party	Candidate	Votes	%	±%
Progressive Conservative	Bob Pennock	22,713	40.5	+9.3
Liberal	Roy MacLaren	21,840	38.9	-8.5
New Democratic	David Robertson	11,136	19.8	-0.2
Libertarian	Roger Hemsley	417	0.7	-0.3
Total valid votes		56,106	100.0	

1980 Canadian federal election
Party	Candidate	Votes	%	±%
Liberal	Roy MacLaren	24,243	47.5	+7.8
Progressive Conservative	David Lakie	15,954	31.2	-5.2
New Democratic	Adrian Dorn	10,237	20.0	-3.2
Libertarian	Alex Eaglesham	524	1.0	+0.5
Marxist–Leninist	Gurdev Singh	75	0.1	0.0
Independent	Khurshed Wadud	49	0.1	
Total valid votes		51,082	100.0	
lop.parl.ca

1979 Canadian federal election
Party	Candidate	Votes	%
Liberal	Roy MacLaren	20,534	39.7
Progressive Conservative	John Noel Hanna	18,886	36.5
New Democratic	Adrian Dorn	12,017	23.2
Libertarian	Ronald Vaughan	269	0.5
Marxist–Leninist	Gurdev Singh	68	0.1
Total valid votes		51,774	100.0

== See also ==
- List of Canadian electoral districts
- Historical federal electoral districts of Canada
