= Kirsty Duncan =

Canadian politician (1966–2026)

The Honourable Kirsty Duncan PC
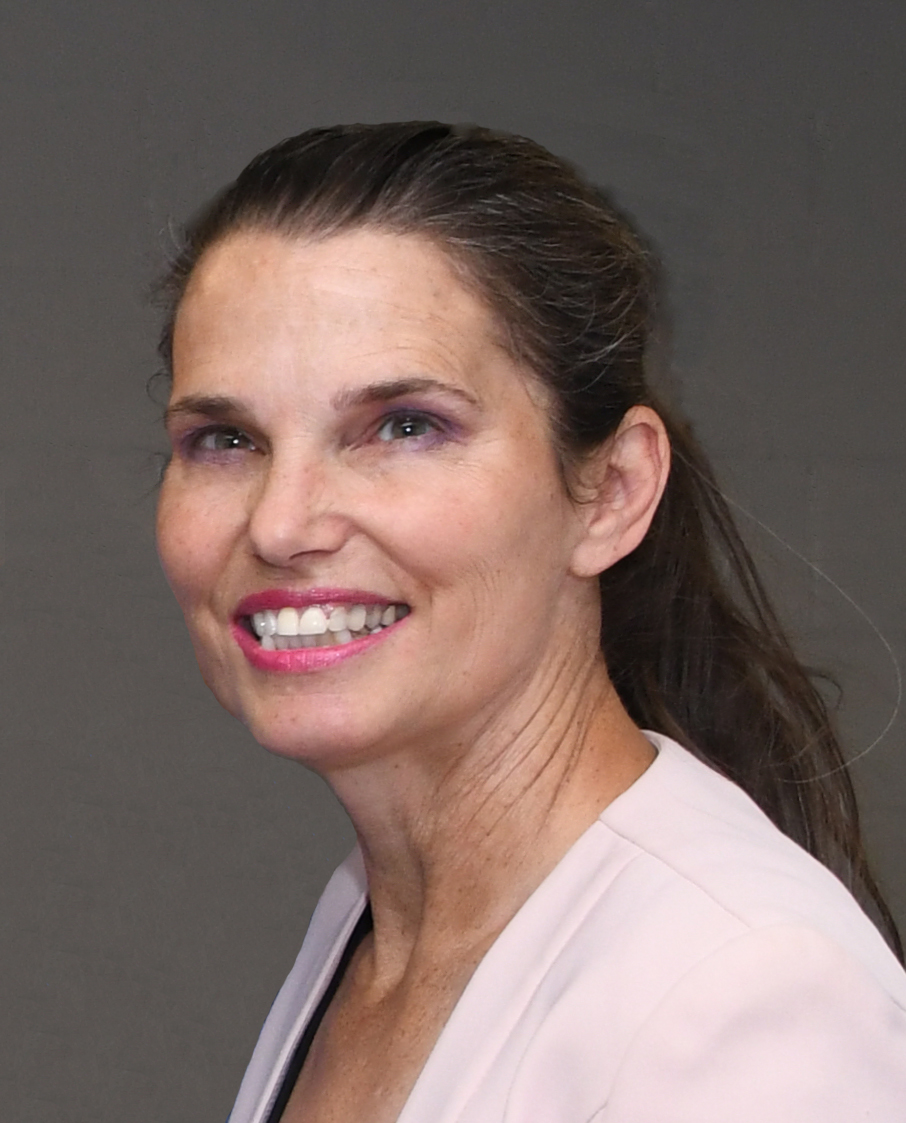
- Duncan in 2019

Deputy Leader of the Government in the House of Commons
- In office November 20, 2019 – December 3, 2021
- Prime Minister: Justin Trudeau
- Preceded by: Chris Bittle
- Succeeded by: Sherry Romanado

Minister of Science and Sport
- In office November 4, 2015 – November 20, 2019
- Prime Minister: Justin Trudeau
- Preceded by: Herself (Sport and Persons with Disabilities); Ed Holder (Science and Technology)
- Succeeded by: Position abolished

Minister of Sport and Persons with Disabilities
- In office January 25, 2018 – July 18, 2018
- Prime Minister: Justin Trudeau
- Preceded by: Kent Hehr
- Succeeded by: Herself (Sport); Carla Qualtrough (Persons with Disabilities)

Member of Parliament for Etobicoke North
- In office October 14, 2008 – April 27, 2025
- Preceded by: Roy Cullen
- Succeeded by: John Zerucelli

Personal details
- Born: Kirsty Ellen Duncan; October 31, 1966 Etobicoke, Ontario, Canada
- Died: January 26, 2026 (aged 59)
- Party: Liberal
- Spouse: Sven Spengemann
- Education: University of Toronto (BA); University of Edinburgh (PhD)
- Profession: Geographer, professor, politician

Kirsty Ellen Duncan PC (October 31, 1966 – January 26, 2026) was a Canadian politician and medical geographer who served as the member of Parliament (MP) for the Toronto riding of Etobicoke North from 2008 to 2025.

In her professional career, she published a book about her 1998 expedition to uncover the cause of the 1918 Spanish flu epidemic. A member of the Liberal Party, Duncan served in the Justin Trudeau government as the deputy leader of the government in the House of Commons from 2019 to 2021, as minister of science and sport from 2015 to 2019, and as minister of persons with disabilities in 2018. She did not seek re-election in the 2025 federal election.

== Early life and education ==
After graduating from Kipling Collegiate Institute in 1985 as an Ontario scholar, Duncan studied geography and anthropology at the University of Toronto. She then entered graduate school at the University of Edinburgh in Scotland, and completed a Doctor of Philosophy (Ph.D.) degree in geography in 1992.

Duncan said that she was emotionally and psychologically abused during her time as a gymnast. According to Duncan, after starting gymnastics at age six, she was repeatedly called fat despite being a normal weight. She developed unhealthy eating habits to avoid gaining weight and by her second undergraduate year, had damaged her stomach lining.

== Academic career ==
Duncan was an associate professor of Health Studies at the University of Toronto, where she taught global environmental processes and medical geography. Duncan was the former research director for the AIC Institute of Corporate Citizenship at the Rotman School of Management. As well, Duncan served on the Intergovernmental Panel on Climate Change, an organization which won the Nobel Prize in 2007.

From 1993 to 2000, Duncan taught meteorology, climatology and climate change at the University of Windsor. In 1992, as she became aware of the increasing probability of a global flu crisis, she was led to investigate the cause of the similar 1918 Spanish flu pandemic, saying, "I was horrified we didn’t know what caused Spanish flu, and also knew that if we could find fragments of the virus, we might be able to find a better flu vaccine".

Though at the time she "knew nothing about influenza", she began what she called a "six-month crash course in virology". Eventually, she began searching for possible frozen samples of lung and brain tissue that might contain the virus. Her initial thoughts led her to think of Alaska, as it contains large areas of permafrost, which would leave the viruses intact, but the search proved fruitless.

Eventually, after several years of searching, Duncan learned of seven miners who had died from the Spanish flu and were buried in the small town of Longyearbyen, Norway, an area that would contain permafrost. She then began assembling a team of scientists to accompany her. After several more years of preparation, which involved garnering various permissions to perform the exhumations, the ground survey began in 1998. The expedition was exemplary in terms of biosafety procedures and treatment of culturally sensitive sites. However, it did not yield samples from which the virus could be reconstructed, as the bodies were not in permafrost.

In 2003, Duncan wrote a book about her unsuccessful expedition, titled Hunting the 1918 Flu: One Scientist's Search for a Killer Virus. Published by the University of Toronto Press, it details Duncan's process and the fruitless expedition itself.

In 2003, Duncan returned to the University of Toronto, teaching medical geography at University of Toronto Scarborough with additional duties teaching corporate social responsibility at the Rotman School of Management. In 2008, Duncan published a second book, Environment and Health: Protecting our Common Future.

As of 2019, Duncan was an adjunct professor teaching both medical geography at the University of Toronto and global environmental processes at Royal Roads University.

In 2018, the University of Edinburgh awarded her an honorary degree. Duncan was also recognized as one of the 100 Influential Women in Oncology by OncoDaily.

Her 2024 book, The Exclusion Effect: How the Sciences Discourage Girls & Women & What to Do About It was shortlisted for a 2024 Science Writers and Communicators of Canada book award.

== Political career ==
In February 2008, Roy Cullen announced that he would not be running in the next federal election and Duncan was appointed the next Liberal candidate. She was elected in the 2008 general election and re-elected in the 2011, 2015, 2019 and 2021 general elections.

On November 4, 2015, Prime Minister Justin Trudeau appointed her to the Cabinet as minister of science. Duncan was tasked with establishing the new position of chief science officer that would serve as a replacement to the national science adviser role eliminated by Stephen Harper in 2008. As well Duncan became minister for sports and persons with disabilities after Kent Hehr resigned from Cabinet following sexual misconduct allegations.

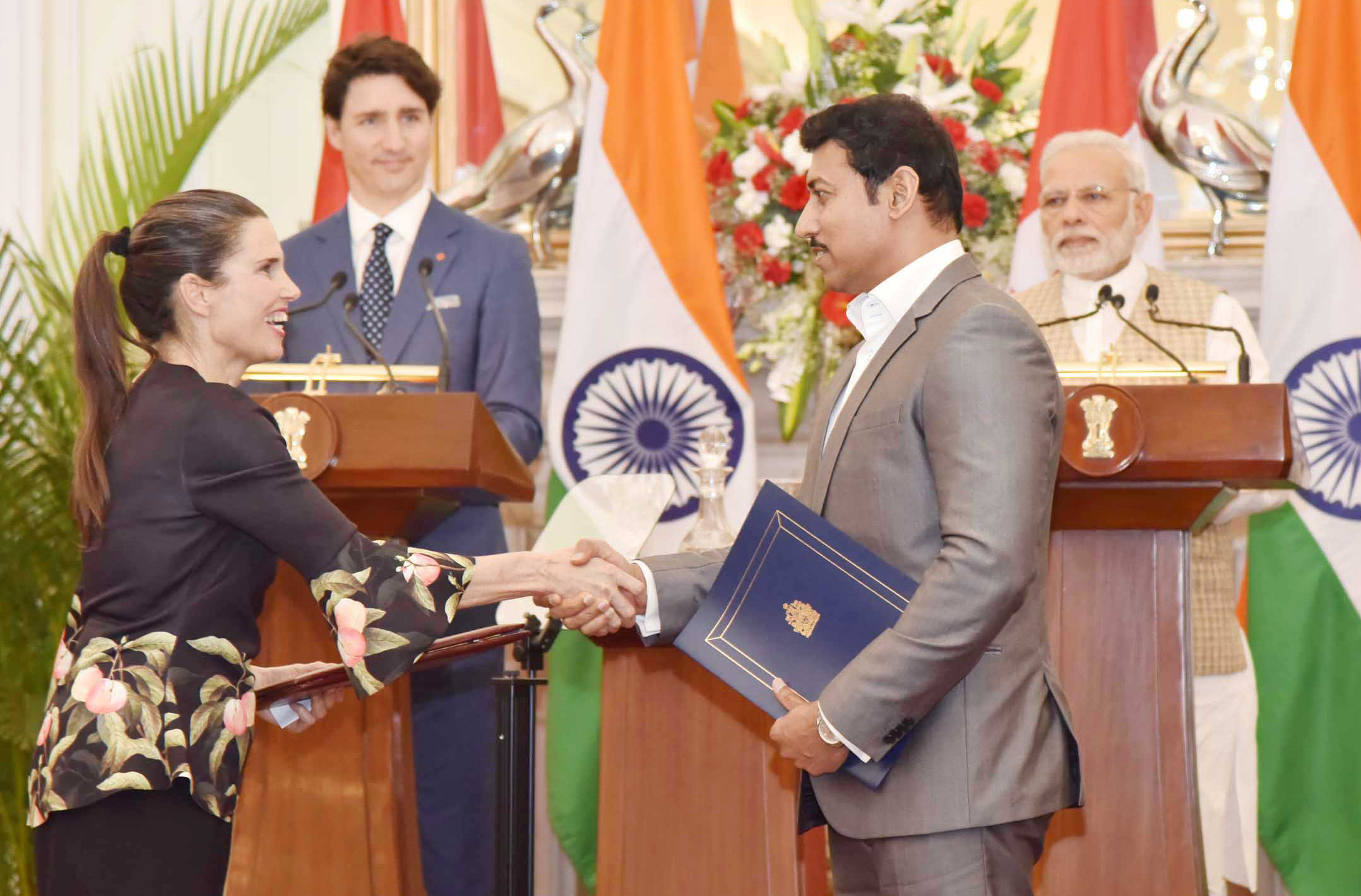
Duncan shaking hands with Indian Youth and Sports Minister Rajyavardhan Singh Rathore, in the presence of Prime Ministers of Canada and India Justin Trudeau and Narendra Modi, in New Delhi, India, 2018

As minister of science and sport, Duncan made ending abuse and harassment in sport her priority since taking over the portfolio in January 2018. In February 2019, Duncan convened provincial and territorial sports ministers to sign a joint declaration on combating misconduct such as abuse, harassment, and discrimination. The 2019 federal budget promised $30 million over the next five years to achieve those goals.

Duncan wanted to institute a series of initiatives, including establishing new policy for national sports organizations, funding the Sport Dispute Resolution Centre of Canada to create an investigation unit, and setting up a toll-free confidential tipline for athletes and witnesses to call if they experience abuse. Duncan's action items included creating a code of conduct with sanctions and finding a way to prevent coaches or officials from freely moving to another province or club after allegations of abuse. Currently this action item is a work in progress.

Her priority as minister of science was to "unmuzzle our scientists". Duncan was able to bring back the long-form census in 2016 and the chief scientific adviser position.

Duncan reported that the government in 2018 devoted $2.8 billion to renewing Canada's federal science laboratories because they said that they understand the critical role that government researchers play in Canada's science and research community.

She was re-elected in the 2019 federal election, following which she was appointed deputy leader of the government in the House of Commons. The sports portfolio folded into the Canadian Heritage portfolio. After the 2021 federal election, she became the chair of the science and research committee.

Duncan issued a statement, on January 26, 2023, that she would be taking a medical leave, but would remain as an MP, because of a "physical health challenge". She returned to parliament in 2024 after treatment for cancer.

On January 27, 2023, Duncan called for a public inquiry into abuse in Canadian sports and criticized the Trudeau government for not effectively following up on her initiatives as sports minister.

In June 2023, Duncan told a House of Commons committee that when her time as sport minister ended in 2019, she had been told the role needed to “get back to what sport was really about” after she asked about plans for tackling safe sport reform. She said she had responded; “So not protecting children.”

On March 21, 2025, Duncan announced that she was not going to run for re-election in the 2025 federal election. She was succeeded by Liberal John Zerucelli.

== Personal life and death ==
Duncan was married to former Liberal MP Sven Spengemann. She died from cancer on January 26, 2026, at the age of 59. Her tribute was paid by many, including former Prime Minister Justin Trudeau, who described her as "curious, generous, and deeply committed to helping others", as well as Prime Minister Mark Carney.

== Electoral record ==
2021 Canadian federal election: Etobicoke North
Party	Candidate	Votes	%	±%	Expenditures
Liberal	Kirsty Duncan	21,201	59.6	-1.8	$71,639.16
Conservative	Priti Lamba	8,866	24.9	+2.7	$81,543.28
New Democratic	Cecil Peter	3,708	10.4	-0.4	none listed
People's	Jim Boutsikakis	1,473	4.1	+1.3	$0.00
Independent	Carol Royer	316	0.9	–	$7,250.71
Total valid votes/expense limit		35,564	–	–	$107,272.58
Total rejected ballots		494			
Turnout		36,058	50.2		
Eligible voters		71,876			
Source: Elections Canada

2019 Canadian federal election: Etobicoke North
Party	Candidate	Votes	%	±%	Expenditures
Liberal	Kirsty Duncan	26,388	61.4	-1.01	$67,270.39
Conservative	Sarabjit Kaur	9,524	22.2	-0.80	none listed
New Democratic	Naiima Farah	4,654	10.8	-1.61	none listed
People's	Renata Ford	1,196	2.8	-	none listed
Green	Nancy Ghuman	1,080	2.5	+1.25	none listed
Canada's Fourth Front	Sudhir Mehta	104	0.2	-	$0.00
Total valid votes/expense limit		42,946	100.0		
Total rejected ballots		565			
Turnout		43,511	58.8		
Eligible voters		73,970			
Liberal hold		Swing		-0.11	
Source: Elections Canada

2015 Canadian federal election: Etobicoke North
Party	Candidate	Votes	%	±%	Expenditures
Liberal	Kirsty Duncan	26,251	62.41	+19.84	$69,670.96
Conservative	Toyin Dada	9,673	23.00	-8.96	$60,237.66
New Democratic	Faisal Hassan	5,220	12.41	-11.21	$37,513.09
Green	Akhtar Ayub	524	1.25	+1.08	$1,558.16
Marxist–Leninist	Anna Di Carlo	232	0.55		–
No affiliation	George Szebik	164	0.39	–	–
Total valid votes/expense limit		42,064	100.00		$201,932.10
Total rejected ballots		257	0.61	–	
Turnout		42,321	62.18	–	
Eligible voters		68,063			
Liberal hold		Swing		+14.40	
Source: Elections Canada

2011 Canadian federal election: Etobicoke North
Party	Candidate	Votes	%	±%	Expenditures
Liberal	Kirsty Duncan	13,665	42.4	-6.2	
Conservative	Priti Lamba	10,357	32.1	+2.0	
New Democratic	Diana Andrews	7,630	23.7	+8.0	
Libertarian	Alex Dvornyak	208	0.7	-4.1	
Marxist–Leninist	Anna Di Carlo	189	0.6	-0.4	
Christian Heritage	John C. Gardner	186	0.6	–	
Total valid votes		32,235	100.0		
Total rejected ballots		279	0.9	+0.2	
Turnout		32,514	52.5		
Eligible voters		61,930	–	–	
Liberal hold		Swing		-4.1	
Source: Elections Canada

2008 Canadian federal election: Etobicoke North
Party	Candidate	Votes	%	±%	Expenditures
Liberal	Kirsty Duncan	15,244	48.6	-13.0	$54,827
Conservative	Bob Saroya	9,436	30.1	+7.8	$64,024
New Democratic	Ali Naqvi	4,940	15.7	+5.1	$35,653
Green	Nigel Barriffe	1,460	4.7	+2.1	$2,242
Marxist–Leninist	Anna Di Carlo	300	1.0	+0.4	
Total valid votes/expense limit		31,380	100.0		$79,011
Total rejected ballots		214	0.68		
Turnout		31,594			
Liberal hold		Swing		-10.4	
Source: Elections Canada

== See also ==
- Johan Hultin, a pathologist who also used frozen tissues to study the 1918 influenza virus

29th Canadian Ministry (2015–2025) – Cabinet of Justin Trudeau
Cabinet posts (2)
Predecessor	Office	Successor
Kent Hehr	Minister of Sport and Persons with Disabilities; January 25, 2018 – July 18, 2018	Herself (Sport); Carla Qualtrough (Persons with Disabilities)
Ed Holder	Minister of Science and Sport; November 4, 2015 – November 20, 2019	Navdeep Bains (Innovation, Science and Industry); Steven Guilbeault (Canadian Heritage)
