= Robert Pennock (politician) =

Canadian politician (1936–2019)

Robert Pennock (14 December 1936 – 9 April 2019) was a Progressive Conservative party member of the House of Commons of Canada. He was a contractor and businessman by career.

Pennock was elected at the Etobicoke North electoral district in the 1984 federal election and served in the 33rd Canadian Parliament, having defeated the incumbent Liberal Party MP, Roy MacLaren. However, Pennock was defeated by MacLaren in the 1988 election.

== Electoral record ==
1988 Canadian federal election: Etobicoke North
Party	Candidate	Votes	%	±%
Liberal	Roy MacLaren	22,618	45.3	+6.4
Progressive Conservative	Bob Pennock	17,261	34.6	-5.9
New Democratic	Ted Humphreys	8,645	17.3	-2.5
Christian Heritage	William Ubbens	849	1.7	
Libertarian	Michael Beech	452	0.9	+0.2
Independent	Gurdev Singh	75	0.2	
Total valid votes		49,900	100.0	

1984 Canadian federal election: Etobicoke North
Party	Candidate	Votes	%	±%
Progressive Conservative	Bob Pennock	22,713	40.5	+9.3
Liberal	Roy MacLaren	21,840	38.9	-8.5
New Democratic	David Robertson	11,136	19.8	-0.2
Libertarian	Roger Hemsley	417	0.7	-0.3
Total valid votes		56,106	100.0	

Parliament of Canada
Preceded by Roy MacLaren	Member of Parliament for Etobicoke North; 1984–1988	Succeeded by Roy MacLaren
