= Markham—Unionville (federal electoral district) =

Federal electoral district in Ontario, Canada

Coordinates: 43.846°N 79.305°W

Ontario electoral district
- Interactive map of riding boundaries from the 2025 federal election

Federal electoral district
- Legislature: House of Commons
MP
Michael Ma
Liberal
- District created: 2003
- First contested: 2004
- Last contested: 2025
- District webpage: profile, map

Demographics
- Population (2021): 128,308
- Electors (2021): 87,781
- Area (km²): 83.78
- Pop. density (per km²): 1,531.5
- Census division: York
- Census subdivision: Markham (part)

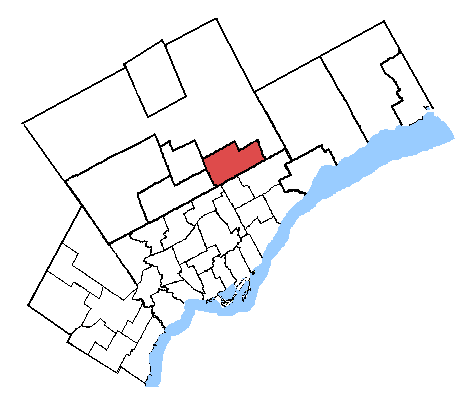
Markham-Unionville 2003 to 2015

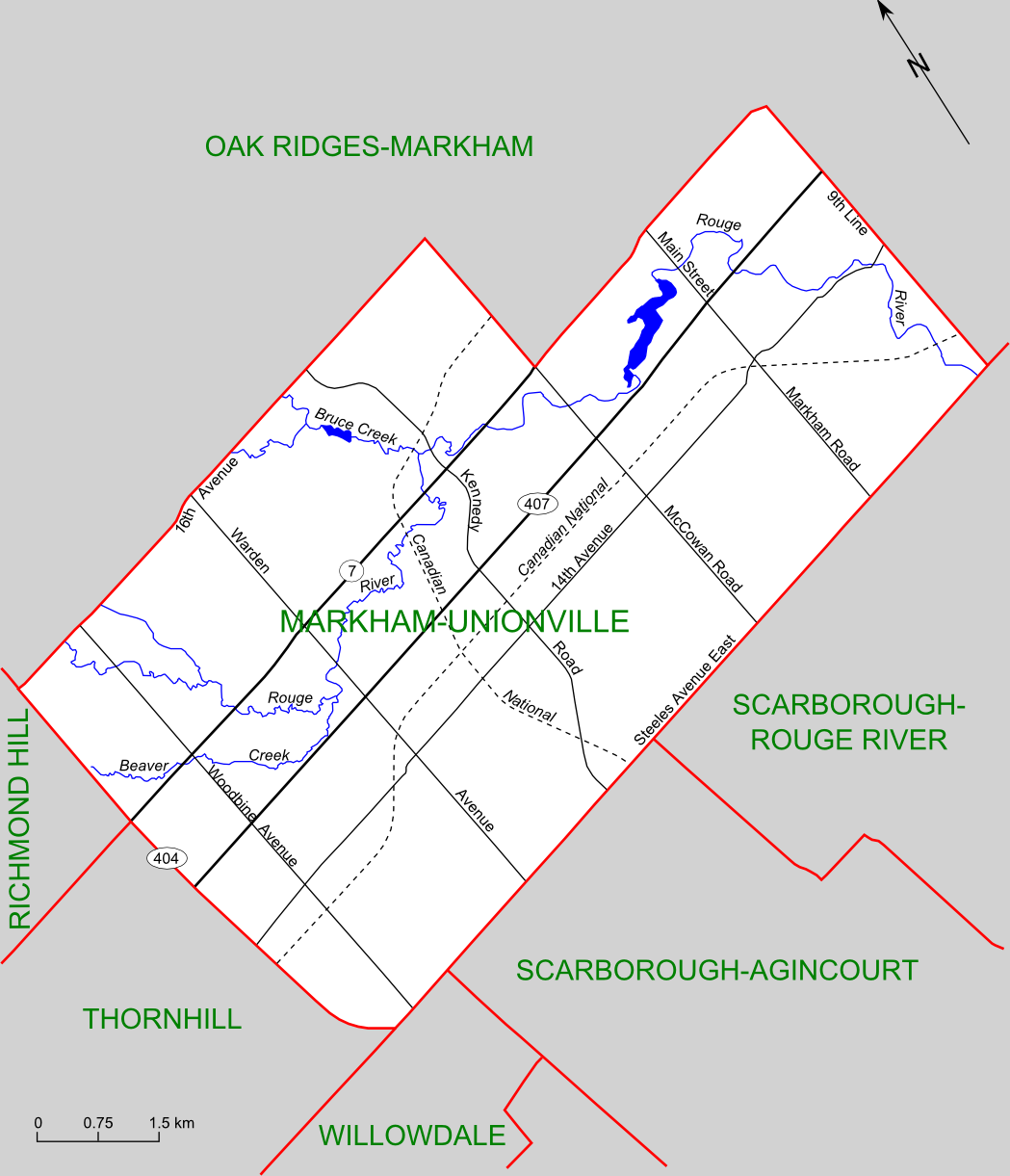
Map of Markham-Unionville (2003 to 2015)

Map of Markham-Unionville (2015 to 2025)

Markham—Unionville is a federal electoral district in Ontario, Canada, that has been represented in the House of Commons of Canada since 2004.

== Boundaries ==
Markham—Unionville is located in the City of Markham within an area bordered by a line commencing at the Highway 404-407 interchange, then east along Highway 407 to McCowan Road, north on McCowan Road to Bur Oak Road, east on Bur Oak to Highway 48, then to the northern city limit, then along the northern and western city boundaries to the 404-407 interchange.

== Demographics ==
According to the 2021 Canadian census

Ethnic groups: 66.6% Chinese, 12.1% White, 9.9% South Asian, 2% Black, 1.4% Filipino, 1.2% West Asian
Languages: 29.5% Yue, 28.4% English, 20.7% Mandarin, 1.6% Tamil
Religions: 51.2% No religion, 33.3% Christian (14.8% Catholic, 2.5% Christian Orthodox, 1.5% Baptist), 4.8% Buddhist, 4.8% Hindu, 4.8% Muslim
Median income (2020): $34,000
Average income (2020): $52,900

== History ==
It is located in the province of Ontario and covers suburban areas north of Toronto. It was created in 2003 from the former Markham riding. The federal riding was first represented by John McCallum until he switched to the newly formed Markham—Thornhill riding for the 2015 election. Markham—Unionville was the only seat that the Liberals lost among those they held after the 2011 election, though the riding's boundaries changed considerably and would have been won by the Conservatives in 2011 based on the redistributed results.

54% of Markham—Unionville's territory (mostly south of Highway 407) was redistributed into the new Markham—Thornhill riding for the 2015 election. The area north of Highway 407 and west of McCowan Road remained in Markham—Unionville. The new Markham—Unionville riding also gained new territory in the northwest corner of the city of Markham which were previously in the riding of Oak Ridges—Markham. 51% of the new riding came from Oak Ridges—Markham.

Following the 2022 Canadian federal electoral redistribution, the riding lost the areas south of Bur Oak Avenue and east of McCowan Road to Markham—Stouffville.

== Members of Parliament ==
The riding has elected the following members of Parliament:

Parliament	Years	Member	Party
Markham—Unionville; Riding created from Markham
38th	2004–2006	John McCallum	Liberal
39th	2006–2008	John McCallum	Liberal
40th	2008–2011	John McCallum	Liberal
41st	2011–2015	John McCallum	Liberal
42nd	2015–2019	Bob Saroya	Conservative
43rd	2019–2021	Bob Saroya	Conservative
44th	2021–2025	Paul Chiang	Liberal
45th	2025–2025	Michael Ma	Conservative
45th	2025–present	Michael Ma	Liberal

== Election results ==
=== 2015-present ===
View source data.
Graph of general election results in Markham—Unionville (minor parties that never got 2% of the vote or didn't run consistently are omitted)

2025 Canadian federal election
Party	Candidate	Votes	%	±%	Expenditures
Conservative	Michael Ma	27,055	50.65	+8.22	
Liberal	Peter Yuen	25,133	47.05	–1.18	
New Democratic	Sameer Qureshi	723	1.35	–5.20	
Green	Elvin Kao	506	0.95	–1.84	
Total valid votes/expense limit					
Total rejected ballots					
Turnout		53,417	64.13		
Eligible voters		83,289			
Conservative notional gain from Liberal		Swing		+4.70	
Source: Elections Canada

2021 federal election redistributed results
Party	Vote	%
Liberal	20,107	48.23
Conservative	17,690	42.43
New Democratic	2,731	6.55
Green	1,162	2.79
Total valid votes	41,690	98.99
Rejected ballots	424	1.01
Registered voters/ estimated turnout	80,570	52.27

2021 Canadian federal election
Party	Candidate	Votes	%	±%	Expenditures
Liberal	Paul Chiang	21,958	48.6	+10.24	$110,433.44
Conservative	Bob Saroya	18,959	41.9	-7.04	$99,523.48
New Democratic	Aftab Qureshi	3,001	6.6	—	$7,138.72
Green	Elvin Kao	1,306	2.9	-1.56	$3,056.16
Total valid votes/expense limit		45,224	–	–	$116,665.09
Total rejected ballots		452			
Turnout		45,676	52.0	-8.9	
Eligible voters		87,781			
Liberal gain from Conservative		Swing		+8.64	
Source: Elections Canada

2019 Canadian federal election
Party	Candidate	Votes	%	±%	Expenditures
Conservative	Bob Saroya	26,133	48.94	-0.43	$105,729.16
Liberal	Alan Ho	20,484	38.36	-4.97	$111,317.79
New Democratic	Gregory Hines	3,524	6.60	+1.53	none listed
Green	Elvin Kao	2,394	4.48	+2.25	$5,836.95
People's	Sarah Chung	861	1.61	–	none listed
Total valid votes/expense limit		53,396	100.0	–	
Total rejected ballots		523	0.97	–	
Turnout		53,919	60.90	+0.22	
Eligible voters		88,538			
Conservative hold		Swing		+2.27	
Source: Elections Canada

2015 Canadian federal election
Party	Candidate	Votes	%	±%	Expenditures
Conservative	Bob Saroya	24,605	49.37	+3.54	$148,191.54
Liberal	Bang-Gu Jiang	21,596	43.33	+9.64	$105,134.99
New Democratic	Colleen Zimmerman	2,528	5.07	-11.45	$3,111.82
Green	Elvin Kao	1,110	2.23	-0.77	$4,322.49
Total valid votes/Expense limit		49,839	100.00	–	$218,774.36
Total rejected ballots		246	0.49	–	
Turnout		50,085	60.68		
Eligible voters		82,534			
Conservative notional hold		Swing		-6.10	
Source: Elections Canada

2011 federal election redistributed results
Party	Vote	%
Conservative	18,025	45.83
Liberal	13,250	33.69
New Democratic	6,500	16.53
Green	1,179	3.00
Others	376	0.96
Total	39,330	100.0

=== 2004-2011 ===
View source data.
Graph of general election results in Markham—Unionville (minor parties that never got 2% of the vote or didn't run consistently are omitted)

2011 Canadian federal election
Party	Candidate	Votes	%	±%	Expenditures
Liberal	John McCallum	19,429	38.9	-16.0	$73,376.21
Conservative	Bob Saroya	17,734	35.5	+5.3	$87,364.37
New Democratic	Nadine Hawkins	10,897	21.8	+11.6	$456.44
Green	Adam Poon	1,597	3.2	-1.0	$10,810.65
Libertarian	Allen Small	231	0.5	–	$1,384.33
Total valid votes/Expense Limit		49,888	100.0	–	$95,073.73
Total rejected ballots		290	0.6	–	
Turnout		50,178	55.1	+2.8	
Eligible voters		91,057	–	–	

2008 Canadian federal election
Party	Candidate	Votes	%	±%	Expenditures
Liberal	John McCallum	25,195	54.9	-6.7	$58,875
Conservative	Duncan Fletcher	13,855	30.2	+3.2	$58,523
New Democratic	Nadine Hawkins	4,682	10.2	+2.2	$4,250
Green	Leonard Aitken	1,931	4.2	+2.0	$2,524
Libertarian	Allen Small	229	0.5	N/A	$348
Total valid votes/Expense limit		45,892	100.0	–	$90,944.51
Turnout		–	52.31		

2006 Canadian federal election
Party	Candidate	Votes	%	±%
Liberal	John McCallum	32,797	61.6	-4.7
Conservative	Joe Li	14,357	27.0	+4.5
New Democratic	Janice Hagan	4,266	8.0	-0.7
Green	Wesley Weese	1,151	2.2	-0.3
Progressive Canadian	Fayaz Choudhary	363	0.7	
Independent	Partap Dua	297	0.6	
Total valid votes		53,231	100.0	

2004 Canadian federal election
Party	Candidate	Votes	%
Liberal	John McCallum	30,442	66.3
Conservative	Joe Li	10,325	22.5
New Democratic	Janice Hagan	3,993	8.7
Green	Ed Wong	1,148	2.5
Total valid votes		45,908	100.0

== See also ==
- List of Canadian electoral districts
- Historical federal electoral districts of Canada
