= Rathika Sitsabaiesan =

Canadian politician (born 1981)

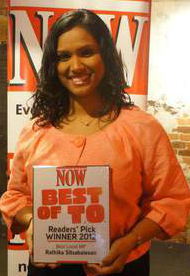
- Sitsabaiesan at the Now Best of Toronto Awards in November 2012

Member of Parliament for Scarborough—Rouge River
- In office May 2, 2011 – August 4, 2015
- Preceded by: Derek Lee
- Succeeded by: Riding dissolved

Personal details
- Born: December 23, 1981 (age 44) Jaffna, Sri Lanka (Note: Other sources state that Sitsabaiesan was born in Achchuveli and Maviddapuram.)
- Citizenship: Canadian
- Party: New Democratic Party (2004-2016); Ontario Liberal Party (2016-present)
- Education: Carleton University; Queen's University
- Occupation: Activist, community worker
- Profession: Labour Relations Specialist
- Committees: Standing Committee for Citizenship and Immigration, Canadian Heritage
- Website: rathika.ca

Rathika Sitsabaiesan (Tamil: இராதிகா சிற்சபையீசன்; born December 23, 1981) is a former Canadian politician who served as the member of Parliament (MP) for Scarborough—Rouge River from 2011 to 2015 as part of the New Democratic Party (NDP) caucus. She is the first Tamil to be elected to the House of Commons of Canada.

== Early life ==
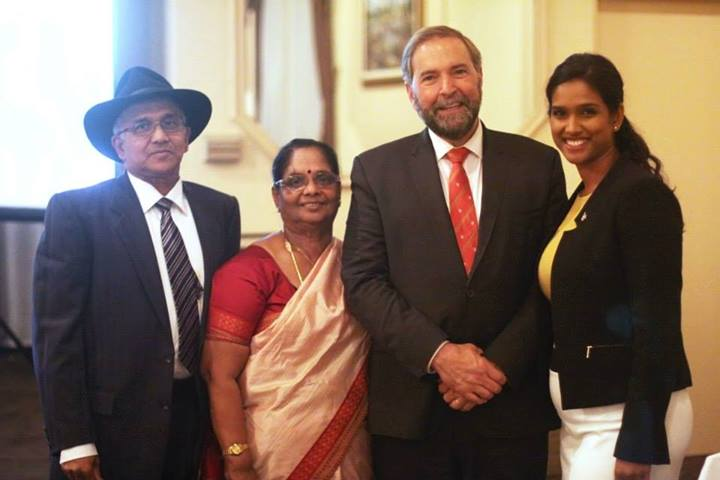
Rathika Sitsabaiesan is seen with her parents and Thomas Mulcair at the Scarborough United Fundraiser event on October 17, 2013.

Rathika Sitsabaiesan was born in Jaffna, Sri Lanka on December 23, 1981; she has three elder sisters. She immigrated to Canada with her family when she was five, and grew up in Mississauga, west of Toronto. When her father was disabled following a workplace accident, her mother had to give up her nursing studies to work in a warehouse to support the family.

Sitsabaiesan attended the University of Toronto for two years, and served as vice president of the Tamil Students Association during that time. She then transferred to Carleton University, and obtained a Bachelor of Commerce degree in 2006. While at Carleton, she served as operations manager of the Rideau River Residence Association, vice president of the Carleton University Students' Association, and caucus chair of the New University Government. She subsequently graduated from Queen's University with a Master's degree in Industrial Relations in 2007, and worked for the University of Toronto Students' Union and the Ontario Labour Relations Board.

Sitsabaiesan is a member of the Board of Directors of the Malvern Community Coalition, a residents' group in Malvern, Toronto.

== Political career ==
Sitsabaiesan worked as a volunteer in Ed Broadbent's campaign for the 2004 federal election. She has served in various roles in the New Democratic Party (NDP), including campaign manager during the 2008 Canadian federal election and acting as an advisor to NDP leader Jack Layton on Tamil issues.

In December 2009, Sitsabaiesan won the nomination to be the NDP's candidate in the Scarborough—Rouge River electoral district in Toronto. Layton made his final campaign stop at Sitsabaiesan's campaign rally a day before the 2011 federal election with his wife and fellow NDP MP Olivia Chow. Scarborough—Rouge River was considered a safe Liberal seat that had been held by Derek Lee (who did not run for re-election in 2011) since its creation in 1988. Sitsabaiesan won the 2011 Canadian federal election after securing 18,935 votes (40.62%). She became the first Tamil Canadian to be elected to the House of Commons, the first female Member of Parliament to represent Scarborough-Rouge River, and only the second Tamil woman to be elected to any federal parliament outside India or Sri Lanka, the first being Singaporean Member of Parliament Indranee Rajah.

Sitsabaiesan was subsequently appointed critic for Post-Secondary Education (Human Resources and Skills Development) in the Official Opposition Shadow Cabinet in the 41st Canadian Parliament, serving until April 2012. She was the NDP's deputy caucus chair from May 2012 to April 2014, then served as the Official Opposition's assistant critic on Canadian Heritage in 2015.

Following the 2012 federal electoral boundaries redistribution, Scarborough—Rouge River was split into two with largest share, 71%, going to Scarborough North with the remaining 29% going to Scarborough—Rouge Park. Sitsabaiesan contested the 2015 federal election in Scarborough North, but in the nationwide Liberal landslide she trailed in third with 8,648 votes (22.07%).

On April 21, 2016, it was reported she was seeking the Ontario Liberal Party nomination for the vacant provincial Scarborough—Rouge River seat; the seat was previously held by Liberal Bas Balkissoon until he resigned on March 22, 2016. However, her bid for the Liberal nomination was unsuccessful.

== Sri Lankan civil war ==
Sitsabaiesan said she would take the initiative to form an All Party Parliamentary Committee (APPC) to look into alleged war crimes in Sri Lanka during the last stages of the war. Furthermore, she would prioritize the formation of the APPC to "research and come up with recommendations" for the Canadian government over the report by the UN Experts Panel appointed by United Nations Secretary General Ban Ki-moon. Sitsabaiesan added, "For me the focus is people being treated with fairness, equality, dignity and justice... it is important for the culprits to be identified as a move towards genuine reconciliation.

During a fact-finding mission in Sri Lanka, Sri Lankan media reported Sitsabaiesan had been under house arrest in Jaffna on December 31, 2013. This claim has been denied by Sri Lankan authorities, and the Canadian High Commission has confirmed that she was not put under house arrest nor was any arrest warrant issued against her.

In November 2014, Sitsabaiesan was criticised for comparing Maaveerar Naal, an annual commemoration for dead Liberation Tigers of Tamil Eelam (LTTE) cadres, with Remembrance Day during a speech in the House of Commons. This was because the LTTE was banned as a terrorist organization in Canada since 2006.

== Awards ==
Sitsabaiesan is the recipient of The V. K. Krishna Menon Institute's "Personality of the Year Award" in 2012. The award was conferred on her for her untiring efforts on human rights issues in Sri Lanka, opposing the persecution of Tamil minorities in Sri Lanka and her ability to represent her constituency without racial and creed prejudices.

== Electoral record ==
2011 Canadian federal election: Scarborough—Rouge River
Party	Candidate	Votes	%	±%	Expenditures
New Democratic	Rathika Sitsabaiesan	18,935	40.6	+26.0	$55,192.59
Conservative	Marlene Gallyot	13,935	29.9	+7.4	
Liberal	Rana Sarkar	12,699	27.2	-31.0	
Green	George Singh	684	1.5	-2.4	
Independent	Mark Balack	357	0.8	–	
Total valid votes/Expense limit		46,610	100.0		
Total rejected ballots		221	0.5	–	
Turnout		46,831	56.2	–	
Eligible voters		83,285	–	–	

2015 Canadian federal election: Scarborough North
Party	Candidate	Votes	%	±%	Expenditures
Liberal	Shaun Chen	18,904	48.24	+19.37	$72,471.61
Conservative	Ravinder Malhi	10,737	27.40	-5.98	$101,170.06
New Democratic	Rathika Sitsabaiesan	8,648	22.07	-13.3	$135,280.61
Green	Eleni MacDonald	579	1.48	-0.14	$668.91
Independent	Raphael Rosch	164	0.42	–	$210.83
Independent	Aasia Khatoon	156	0.40	–	$1,724.47
Total valid votes/expense limit		39,188	100.0		$199,432.15
Total rejected ballots		216	–	–	
Turnout		39,404	60.87	–	
Eligible voters		64,827			
Liberal notional gain from New Democratic		Swing		+16.34	
Source: Elections Canada

== Filmography ==
=== Films ===
Year	Title	Role	Notes
2024	Ray of Hope	Self	
