= Chin Lee =

Canadian politician

- 李振光
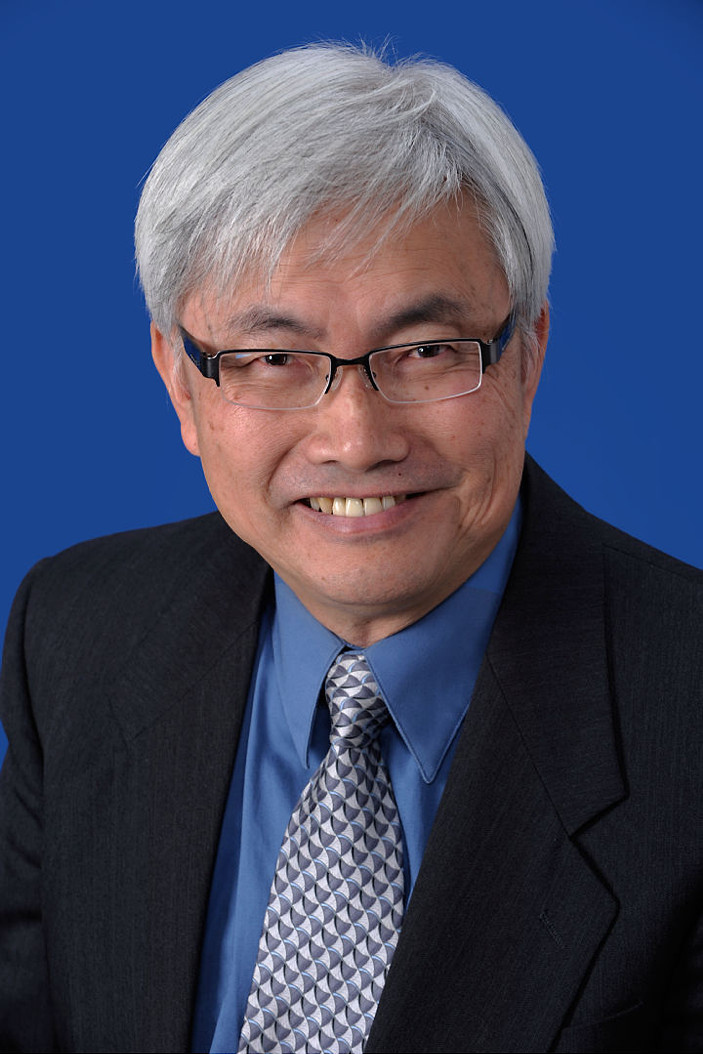
- Lee in 2010

Toronto City Councillor for (Ward 41) Scarborough—Rouge River
- In office December 1, 2006 – May 11, 2018
- Preceded by: Paul Ainslie
- Succeeded by: Miganoush Megardichian

Personal details
- Occupation: Consultant

Chin Lee (Chinese: 李振光; pinyin: Lǐ Zhèngguāng) is a former Canadian city councillor in Toronto, Ontario, Canada, from Scarborough for Ward 41 Scarborough-Rouge River until his resignation in May 2018.

Lee was elected to Toronto City Council in the November 2006 civic elections for Ward 41 - Scarborough—Rouge River. He replaced former councillor and MPP Bas Balkissoon. Lee is also a member of the Scarborough Community Council.

Lee was one of Toronto City Council's three appointees to the seven-member Toronto Police Services Board from 2010 to 2012 and again from 2014 to 2018.

He is one of four councillors of Asian heritage elected to city council in Toronto in 2014, the other three being Councillor Denzil Minnan-Wong, Councillor Kristyn Wong-Tam and Korean born, Councillor Raymond Cho.

Born to Chinese-Malaysian parents, his grandparents came from the Kaiping/Taishan region of the Guangdong province in China.

== Community activism ==
Prior to entering politics Chin Lee served as President of the Goldhawk Community Association, serving the northeast Scarborough Community.

He was a founding member of Scarborough Needs Accountable Politicians (SNAP), a community organization that was created to oppose pay increases that Scarborough School Board Trustees approved for themselves.

Chin Lee, along with other community leaders such as Bas Balkissoon formed Scarborough Homeowners Alliance for Fair Taxation (SHAFT), a grassroots taxpayer group that fought to make changes to the Province of Ontario's property assessment system.

On October 27, 2017, Lee announced that he would be seeking the Liberal nomination for the 2018 provincial election in Scarborough North. On November 6, 2017, he was acclaimed as the candidate. In the general election, he placed third, losing to incumbent Progressive Conservative MPP Raymond Cho by more than a two-to-one margin and placing behind the New Democratic candidate.

== Election results ==
2018 Ontario general election: Scarborough North
Party	Candidate	Votes	%	±%
Progressive Conservative	Raymond Cho	17,413	51.05	+19.87
New Democratic	Dwayne Morgan	8,320	24.39	–1.75
Liberal	Chin Lee	7,519	22.04	–18.03
Green	Nicole Peltier	543	1.59	–0.01
Libertarian	Sean Morgan	318	0.93	N/A
Total valid votes		34,113	100.0	
Progressive Conservative notional gain from Liberal		Swing		+10.81
Source: Elections Ontario

2010 Toronto election, Ward 41
Candidate	Votes	%
Chin Lee	12,557	70.6
Patricia Sinclair	2,718	15.3
Danny Chien	2,507	14.1
Total	17,782	100%

2006 Toronto election, Ward 41
Candidate	Votes	%
Chin Lee	5,501	37.8
David Robertson	3,324	22.9
Thadsha Navamanikkam	1,727	11.9
Hratch Aynedjian	1,376	9.5
Scott Shi	926	6.4
John Ching	690	4.7
Sonny Yeung	365	2.5
Malcolm Mansfield	338	2.3
Jose Baking	158	1.1
Min Lee	139	1.0
Total	14,544	100%

1994 Toronto election, Scarborough Ward 11
Candidate	Votes	%
Sherene Shaw	3,197	43.1
Don Lombardi	2,272	30.6
Chin Lee	1,944	26.2
Total	7,413	100%
