= Raymond Cho (politician) =

Canadian politician

The Honourable Raymond Cho ECO MPP
- 조성준
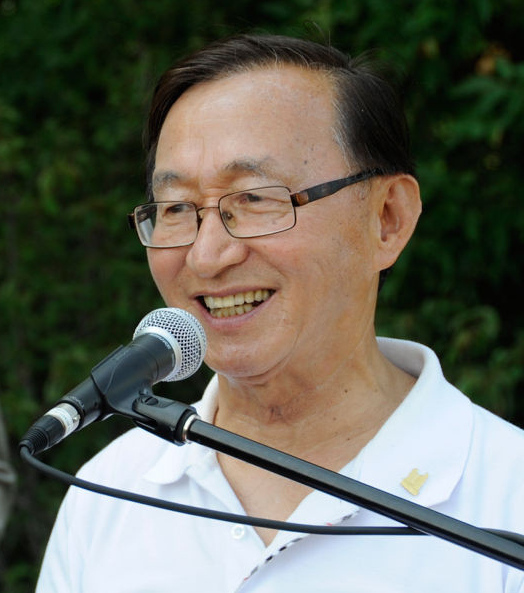
- Cho in 2010

Minister for Seniors and Accessibility
- Incumbent
- Assumed office June 29, 2018
- Premier: Doug Ford
- Preceded by: Dipika Damerla

Member of the Ontario Provincial Parliament for Scarborough North (Scarborough—Rouge River; 2016-2018)
- Incumbent
- Assumed office September 1, 2016
- Preceded by: Bas Balkissoon

Toronto City Councillor for Ward 42 Scarborough—Rouge River
- In office December 1, 2000 – September 10, 2016
- Preceded by: New ward
- Succeeded by: Neethan Shan

Chair of the Scarborough Community Council
- In office December 1, 2003 – June 27, 2005
- Preceded by: Ron Moeser
- Succeeded by: Michael Thompson

Toronto City Councillor for Ward 18 Scarborough Malvern
- In office January 1, 1998 – December 1, 2000 Serving with Bas Balkissoon
- Preceded by: Ward created
- Succeeded by: Ward dissolved

Metro Toronto Councillor for Ward 18 Scarborough Malvern
- In office December 1, 1991 – January 1, 1998
- Preceded by: Bob Sanders
- Succeeded by: City amalgamated

Personal details
- Born: November 18, 1936 (age 89) Seoul, Japanese-Occupied Korea
- Party: Progressive Conservative
- Other political affiliations: New Democratic (until 1991); Independent Liberal (2004); Ontario Liberal (2005); Independent (municipal)
- Spouse: Soon Ok (m. 1968)
- Children: 3
- Education: Hankuk University of Foreign Studies; University of Toronto
- Occupation: Social worker; politician

Raymond Sung Joon Cho (Korean: 조성준; born November 18, 1936) is a Canadian politician who has served as a member of Provincial Parliament (MPP) in Ontario since 2016. Initially the member for the riding of Scarborough—Rouge River, he currently represents Scarborough North, and is the Legislative Assembly's oldest sitting MPP. A member of the Progressive Conservative Party of Ontario (PC), Cho has served in the cabinet of Premier Doug Ford as the minister for seniors and accessibility since 2018.

Cho's over 30-year long political career began in 1991 when he was first elected to the Metro Toronto Council. Following amalgamation in 1998, Cho served on Toronto City Council until his election as MPP in 2016. Prior to entering politics, Cho worked as a social worker.

== Early life and education ==
Cho graduated from the Hankuk University of Foreign Studies in Seoul, South Korea, with a Bachelor of Arts in English. After working for a while at the American embassy in Seoul, he immigrated to Canada in 1967. He initially arrived in Vancouver and worked as a dishwasher, then moved to northern British Columbia to work as an asbestos miner, janitor and waiter. He started the Master of Business Administration program at the University of British Columbia, but did not finish it. He subsequently re-settled in Toronto, where he went on to receive a Master of Social Work, Master of Education, and a Doctorate of Counseling Psychology from the University of Toronto. Cho then worked as a social worker for the Catholic Children's Aid Society, the Toronto Board of Education, and the Scarborough Board of Education.

=== Personal life ===
Cho is married to Soon Ok, and has three adult sons: Raymond Jr., Ronald, and William. In 2018, Cho suffered a stroke while campaigning in Scarborough. He was taken to Sunnybrook Health Sciences Centre and treated in intensive care. Cho continued to suffer balance issues after his stay in hospital.

== Political career ==
Cho ran in the 1988 federal election as a New Democratic Party (NDP) candidate in Scarborough—Rouge River, but lost to Liberal candidate Derek Lee. He was first elected to Metropolitan Toronto Council for Scarborough-Malvern in 1991, and was re-elected in 1994. He initially identified as a New Democrat when he joined Metro Council; however, he soon became an ally and supporter of then-Metropolitan Toronto Chairman Alan Tonks and dropped his NDP affiliation. He subsequently took out membership in the federal Liberals, although like most non-NDP municipal politicians in Ontario, he did not run on a party label in municipal elections.

With Scarborough and other suburbs being amalgamated into the new City of Toronto, Cho was elected to the new council in the 1997 municipal election, representing Scarborough-Malvern along with Bas Balkissoon. He was re-elected to council in 2000 for the new ward of Scarborough-Rouge River, and won re-election there in 2003, 2006, 2010 and 2014. He also served as chair of the Toronto Zoo board of management for four terms.

In the 2004 federal election he once again contested the riding of Scarborough—Rouge River; this time he called himself an "independent Liberal", and used the Liberal Party of Canada's red-and-white colours for his campaign materials. He was accused of trying to mislead voters by the official Liberal candidate Derek Lee, who had been the riding's member of Parliament since 1988. Lee said that Cho caused some controversy by claiming to have been shut out of the candidate nomination process. Lee won the election, while Cho placed a distant second with 6,962 votes (17.8% of the total).

On August 13, 2004, the Toronto Star reported that Cho spent nearly all of his allotted councillor expense fund, one of the highest on city council. While there was some speculation that some of this money was diverted to Cho's failed bid to run in the federal election campaign, his executive assistant said the money was needed for newsletters mailed out to constituents to provide information on a rash of fatal shootings in the Malvern neighbourhood earlier in the year.

In 2005, Cho expressed interest in being the Ontario Liberal Party's candidate in the Scarborough—Rouge River provincial by-election, which was made necessary by the appointment of incumbent Liberal MPP Alvin Curling to a diplomatic position. However, the Liberal riding association used a clause of its constitution to declare another city councillor, Bas Balkissoon, as its candidate without a contested nomination process. Media reports suggested that this was done to exclude Cho as the provincial riding association was displeased with Cho's "independent Liberal" candidacy in the 2004 federal election. Cho was also mentioned as a potential candidate for the Progressive Conservatives since he helped former leader John Tory during the March 2005 by-election in Dufferin—Peel—Wellington—Grey. In the end, Cho chose not to run in the by-election which was won handily by Balkissoon.

Cho was named the PC candidate for the provincial riding of Scarborough—Rouge River in 2012. He placed third with 27.68% of the vote in the 2014 provincial election, behind the incumbent Balkissoon and NDP candidate Neethan Shan.

Following Balkissoon's resignation as Scarborough—Rouge River MPP in 2016, Cho was acclaimed as the PC candidate for the ensuing by-election. He won the September 1 by-election in an upset victory, becoming the first Korean-Canadian elected to the Ontario Legislature. Doug Ford, then a former city councillor, served as his campaign chair. He was named opposition critic for citizenship and immigration, and for City of Toronto issues in February 2017.

Cho was handily re-elected in the 2018 provincial election in the new riding of Scarborough North, winning over half of the popular vote. He was involved in a physical altercation with a 12-year-old child while campaigning; he later apologized. He was named to Premier Doug Ford's cabinet that June as minister for seniors and accessibility, and retained that post following his re-election in 2022 and 2025.

== Election results ==
=== Federal ===
==== Scarborough—Rouge River ====
2004 Canadian federal election
Party	Candidate	Votes	%	±%
Liberal	Derek Lee	22,564	57.9	−21.2
Independent	Raymond Cho	6,962	17.9	
Conservative	Tony Backhurst	5,184	13.3	−2.7
New Democratic	Fauzia Khan	3,635	9.3	+4.4
Green	Kathryn Holloway	610	1.5	
Total valid votes		38,955	100.0	

Note: Conservative vote is compared to the total of the Canadian Alliance vote and Progressive Conservative vote in 2000 election.

1988 Canadian federal election
Party	Candidate	Votes	%
Liberal	Derek Lee	22,767	47.1
Progressive Conservative	Doug Boswell	18,171	37.6
New Democratic	Raymond Cho	6,589	13.6
Libertarian	Simon Harvey	513	1.1
Green	Lois James	286	0.6
Total valid votes		48,326	100.0

=== Provincial ===
==== Scarborough North ====
2025 Ontario general election: Scarborough North
Party	Candidate	Votes	%	±%
Progressive Conservative	Raymond Cho	13,031	52.98	+4.67
Liberal	Anita Anandarajan	8,548	34.75	+5.14
New Democratic	Thadsha Navaneethan	2,554	10.38	–8.03
Green	Zdravko Gunjevic	465	1.89	+0.06
Total valid votes		24,598	99.46	
Total rejected, unmarked and declined ballots		134	0.54	+0.01
Turnout		24,732	37.00	–2.26
Eligible voters		66,842		
Progressive Conservative hold		Swing		–0.24
Source: Elections Ontario

2022 Ontario general election: Scarborough North
Party	Candidate	Votes	%	±%	Expenditures
Progressive Conservative	Raymond Cho	12,646	48.31	–2.74	$59,970
Liberal	Anita Anandarajan	7,750	29.61	+7.56	$27,802
New Democratic	Justin Kong	4,820	18.41	–5.98	$46,774
Green	Tara McMahon	479	1.83	+0.24	$0
New Blue	James Bountrogiannis	277	1.06	–	$1,067
Ontario Party	Pete Grusys	105	0.40	–	$0
None of the Above	Mark Dickson	100	0.38	–	$156
Total valid votes/expense limit		26,177	99.46	–	$93,845
Total rejected, unmarked and declined ballots		141	0.54	–0.30	
Turnout		26,318	39.26	–11.50	
Eligible voters		67,032			
Progressive Conservative hold		Swing		–5.15	
Source: Elections Ontario

2018 Ontario general election: Scarborough North
Party	Candidate	Votes	%	±%
Progressive Conservative	Raymond Cho	17,413	51.05	+19.87
New Democratic	Dwayne Morgan	8,320	24.39	–1.75
Liberal	Chin Lee	7,519	22.04	–18.03
Green	Nicole Peltier	543	1.59	–0.01
Libertarian	Sean Morgan	318	0.93	–
Total valid votes		34,113	99.16	
Total rejected, unmarked and declined ballots		288	0.84	
Turnout		34,401	50.76	
Eligible voters		67,775		
Progressive Conservative notional gain from Liberal		Swing		+10.81
Source: Elections Ontario

==== Scarborough—Rouge River ====
Ontario provincial by-election, September 1, 2016 Resignation of Bas Balkissoon
Party	Candidate	Votes	%	±%
Progressive Conservative	Raymond Cho	9,644	38.58	+10.92
Liberal	Piragal Thiru	7,257	28.91	−9.79
New Democratic	Neethan Shan	6,905	27.40	−3.91
Independent	Queenie Yu	575	2.32	
Green	Priyan De Silva	216	0.86	−0.51
Libertarian	Allen Small	146	0.58	
None of the Above	Above Znoneofthe	133	0.54	−0.42
Freedom	Wayne Simmons	59	0.30	
People's Political Party	Dwight McLean	45	0.22	
Pauper	John Turmel	37	0.15	
Trillium	Ania Krosinska	36	0.14	
Total valid votes		25,182	100.00	
Progressive Conservative gain from Liberal		Swing		+10.36

2014 Ontario general election
Party	Candidate	Votes	%	±%
Liberal	Bas Balkissoon	16,095	38.71	−3.17
New Democratic	Neethan Shan	13,019	31.31	−4.66
Progressive Conservative	Raymond Cho	11,500	27.66	+8.87
Green	George B. Singh	571	1.37	+0.12
None of the Above	Amir Khan	398	0.96	
Total valid votes		41,583	100.00	
Total rejected, unmarked and declined ballots		479	1.14	
Turnout		42,062	47.48	
Eligible voters		88,592		
Liberal hold		Swing		+0.75
Source: Elections Ontario

=== Municipal ===
==== Ward 42 (Scarborough—Rouge River) ====
2010 Toronto election, Ward 42
Candidate	Votes	%
(x) Raymond Cho	10,811	52.93%
Neethan Shan	6,873	33.65%
Shamoon Poonawala	586	2.869%
Mohammed Ather	474	2.321%
Namu Ponnambalam	443	2.169%
Ruth Tecle	437	2.14%
George Singh	353	1.728%
Leon Saul	323	1.581%
Venthan Ramanathavavuniyan	125	0.612%
Total	20,425	100%

2006 Toronto election, Ward 42
Candidate	Votes	%
(x) Raymond Cho	7480	52.2
Kumar Nadarajah	3683	25.7
Mohammed Ather	1639	11.4
Bonnie Irwin	1532	10.7

2003 Toronto election, Ward 42
Candidate	Votes	%
(x) Raymond Cho	8,302	70.0
Paulette Senior	3,314	27.9
Akeem Fasasi	245	2.1

2000 Toronto election, Ward 42
Candidate	Votes	%
(x) Raymond Cho	7,428	
Eden Gajraj	2,101	
Horace Dockery	1,890	
Pat Johnson	562	

1997 Toronto election, Ward 18 - Scarborough Malvern (2 elected)
Candidate	Votes	%
(x) Raymond Cho	11,190	
Bas Balkissoon	10,745	
Edith Montgomery	10,659	
Jim Mackey	2,621	
Terry Singh	1,812	
Sinna Chelliah	1,165	
Jasmine Singh	871	
Arlanna Lewis	666	
George B. Singh	339	

1994 Toronto election, Scarborough Malvern
Candidate	Votes	%
(x) Raymond Cho	10,272	
Diamond Tobin-West	3,382	
Yaqoob Khan	1,807	

1991 Toronto election, Scarborough Malvern
Candidate	Votes	%
Raymond Cho	5,283	
(x) Bob Sanders	3,977	
Shan Rana	1,321	

(x) - incumbent

=== Cabinet positions ===
Ford ministry, Province of Ontario (2018–present)
Cabinet post (1)
Predecessor	Office	Successor
Dipika Damerla	Minister of Seniors and Accessibility; June 29, 2018 – present	Incumbent
