= Migan Megardichian =

Canadian politician

Toronto City Councillor for Ward 41 (Scarborough—Rouge River)
- In office June 26, 2018 – December 1, 2018
- Preceded by: Chin Lee
- Succeeded by: Ward Abolished

Personal details
- Party: Independent
- Occupation: Lawyer

Miganoush "Migan" Megardichian is a Canadian politician, who was appointed to Toronto City Council on June 26, 2018.

She represented what was designated Ward 41, Scarborough—Rouge River, which had been vacant since the resignation of Chin Lee in May 2018, and she served the remainder of the term until the following municipal election in October 2018. She did not stand for election in 2018.

Megardichian is a resident of Scarborough Centre, and speaks Armenian, Persian, French, Spanish and Russian. She serves on the Board for Skate Ontario and Freestyle Canada.
