= Derek Lee (politician) =

Canadian politician

Derek Vincent Lee

Member of Parliament for Scarborough—Rouge River
- In office November 21, 1988 – March 26, 2011
- Preceded by: Riding established
- Succeeded by: Rathika Sitsabaiesan

Personal details
- Born: October 2, 1948 (age 77) Halifax, Nova Scotia
- Party: Liberal
- Spouse: Ingrid Lee
- Children: 2
- Education: University of Toronto; Queen's University Faculty of Law
- Profession: Lawyer

Derek Vincent Lee (born October 2, 1948) is a former Canadian politician. He served as the member of Parliament (MP) for the Ontario riding of Scarborough—Rouge River from 1988 to 2011 as part of the Liberal Party of Canada caucus.

== Background ==
Born in Halifax, Nova Scotia, Lee moved to Toronto at age 10 with his family when his father, a Royal Canadian Mounted Police officer, was transferred there. After graduating from Neil McNeil High School in 1966, he briefly attended a seminary school in the United States before entering the University of Toronto, from which he received a bachelor of arts degree in political science. He subsequently graduated with a law degree from the Queen's University Faculty of Law.

He is married to Ingrid Lee and has two children.

== Politics ==
He was approached to join the Liberal Party of Canada in 1979, and worked in the York—Scarborough riding executive as assistant to MP Paul Cosgrove. When Cosgrove decided not to run for re-election in 1984, Lee contested the nomination bid for that riding's Liberal candidacy, but lost to June Rowlands. He also served as political assistant to Ontario housing minister Alvin Curling in 1985.

Lee ran as the Liberal candidate for the newly established riding of Scarborough—Rouge River in the 1988 federal election, defeating New Democratic Party candidate Raymond Cho and others to become the riding's MP. In the run-up to the 1993 federal election, he was in danger of losing a nomination battle to challenger Gobinder Randhawa. However, Liberal leader Jean Chrétien intervened and designated Lee as the candidate. He was re-elected that year, and in every subsequent election until he retired in 2011.

During his tenure as MP, he supported judicial reform. In 1993, he tabled a private member's bill that would have given rape victims the right to have blood samples taken from an offender. From 1999 to 2001 he was the parliamentary secretary to the leader of the government in the House of Commons. In opposition he served as critic for the Treasury Board and assistant critic for the Solicitor General in the 34th Parliament, assistant critic for public safety and emergency preparedness from 2006 to 2007, and critic for national revenue from 2009 to 2010.

On March 24, 2011, Lee announced he was retiring from politics. He said it was "time to press the refresh button" for the riding that he has represented for 23 years.

== Books ==
Lee has written three books which discuss the regulations of the House of Commons:

- Matters related to the review of the Office of the Privacy Commissioner: report of the Standing Committee on Government Operations and Estimates. (2003).
- Improving the Supreme Court of Canada appointments process: report of the Standing Committee on Justice, Human Rights, Public Safety and Emergency Preparedness. (2004).
- The Power of Parliamentary Houses to Send for Persons, Papers & Records: A Sourcebook on the Law and Precedent of Parliamentary Subpoena Powers for Canadian and Other Houses (Toronto: University of Toronto Press, 1999).

== Beliefs ==
While Lee was a member of the Liberal Party, he espoused social conservative viewpoints. Contrary to Liberal party policy, he expressed anti-abortion views, and also supported the death penalty. He said, "I believe the death penalty should always be available to reflect the degree of society's disgust at certain capital crimes." He also opposed same sex marriage.

Lee also received criticism for his support of the controversial Church of Scientology. Lee addressed Scientology seminars and appeared in a promotional video for the Church of Scientology. Lee identifies as a Roman Catholic and is not a member of the Church of Scientology. He once considered becoming a priest but he is no longer drawn to the Roman Catholic religion. "I have done some cursory reading. I'm not personally drawn to [Catholicism], but I have to say that about many religious faiths."
