= Ministry of Seniors and Accessibility =

Ministry of Ontario, Canada

Ministry for Seniors and Accessibility
- French: Ministère des Services aux aînés et de l’Accessibilité
- Government of Ontario wordmark

Ministry overview
- Formed: 2018
- Preceding Ministry: Ontario Seniors' Secretariat and Accessibility Directorate of Ontario
- Headquarters: 777 Bay Street Toronto, Ontario
- Ministers responsible: Raymond Cho, Minister for Seniors and Accessibility; Daisy Wai, Parliamentary Assistant to the Minister for Seniors and Accessibility
- Website: www.ontario.ca/page/ministry-seniors-accessibility

The Ministry for Seniors and Accessibility is a ministry of the Government of Ontario responsible for issues relating to seniors and persons with disabilities in the Canadian province of Ontario. The Minister responsible is Raymond Cho.

== Mandate ==
The mandate of the ministry is stated to be:

The Ministry for Seniors and Accessibility supports the health, well-being, and barrier free participation of people with disabilities and older Ontarians. The ministry works to improve quality of life by changing perceptions and promoting the social and economic benefits of a diverse, inclusive, and accessible Ontario—one where everyone is respected and empowered to contribute.

== Agencies, boards and commissions ==
The ministry oversees the Retirement Homes Regulatory Authority (RHRA) and the Accessibility Standards Advisory Council.

== Criticism ==
In 2023, an independent review of the Accessibility for Ontarians with Disabilities Act identified a "lack of accountability" with regard to the implementation of the act, and noted that legislative enforcement did "not exist".

David Lepofsky, chair of the Accessibility for Ontarians with Disabilities Act Alliance, stated "The report found that Ontario is far behind schedule and has no effective action plan to lead this province to become accessible by 2025 or by any time in the future," with the ministry stating "We believe Mr. Donovan's report warranted time spent on a thoughtful analysis and response to his recommendations and that is what we have done".
