= 1994 Toronto municipal election =

1994 Toronto mayoral election
- November 12, 1994
- Turnout: 36.7%
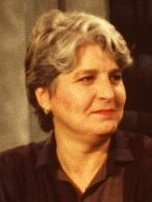

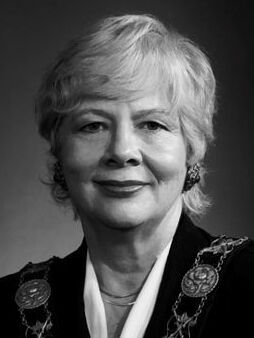
			GM
Candidate	Barbara Hall	June Rowlands	Gerry Meinzer
Popular vote	70,248	58,952	20,868
Percentage	43.1%	36.1%	12.8%
Mayor of Toronto before election
June Rowlands
Elected Mayor of Toronto
Barbara Hall

The 1994 Toronto municipal election was held in November 1994 to elect councillors in Metropolitan Toronto, Ontario, Canada, and mayors, councillors and school trustees in Toronto, York, East York, North York, Scarborough and Etobicoke.

The election was noted as a defeat for incumbents. Three sitting mayors were defeated: June Rowlands in Toronto, Fergy Brown, in York, and Bruce Sinclair of Etobicoke. On Metro Toronto Council it was a victory for the left as the New Democratic Party (NDP) faction grew from six to nine members.

== Metro Council ==
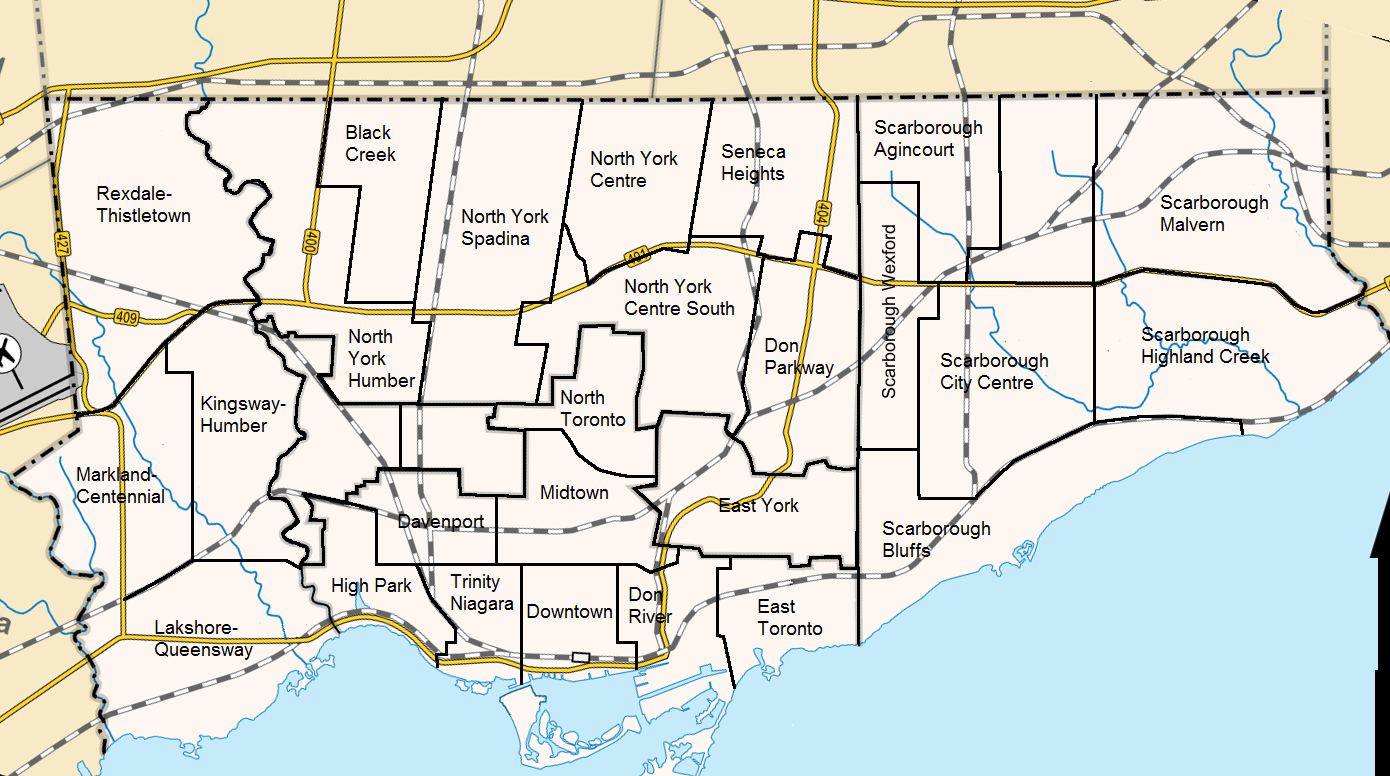
The electoral divisions used for Metro in the 1994 election

Ten of Metro Council's 28 members ran unopposed in the election, and they were therefore acclaimed. No incumbents were defeated. The most noted change was the growth of the left wing NDP faction from six to nine. New NDP members were David Miller, Caroline Di Giovanni, and mayor Michael Prue.

High Park
David Miller – 7,950
Andrew Witer – 6,845
Tony Clement – 4,722
Carl Manning – 1,390

Trinity Niagara
Joe Pantalone (incumbent) – acclaimed

Downtown
Olivia Chow (incumbent) – 13,327
Jeffrey Valentine – 5,940

Don River
Jack Layton – 10,117
Paul Raina – 3,927
Nola Crew – 3,898
John Stavropoulos – 2,080
Amber Martin – 546

East Toronto
Paul Christie (incumbent) – 15,437
Karen Buck – 4,156
James Alcock – 1,118

Davenport
Dennis Fotinos (incumbent) – acclaimed

Midtown
Ila Bossons (incumbent) – 10,945
Paul Moscoe – 6,650
Yen Shih – 2,171

North Toronto
Anne Johnston (incumbent) – acclaimed

East York
Case Ootes – 12,511
John Papadakis – 8,631
Steve Hajagos – 1,785

Lakeshore Queensway
Blake Kinahan (incumbent) – 8,699
Jeff Knoll – 8,151

Markland Centennial
Dick O'Brien (incumbent) – acclaimed

Kingsway Humber
Dennis Flynn (incumbent) – acclaimed

Rexdale Thistletown
Lois Griffin (incumbent) – 6,829
John Kiru – 4,738
Patrick T. McCool – 1,575

North York Humber
Judy Sgro – acclaimed

Black Creek
Maria Augimeri (incumbent) – 12,925
Camilo Tiqui – 1,784

North York Spadina
Howard Moscoe (incumbent) – acclaimed

North York Centre South
Bev Salmon (incumbent) – acclaimed

North York Centre
Norman Gardner (incumbent) – acclaimed

Don Parkway
Gordon Chong – 6,870
Darlene Scott – 4,912
Simon Lagopoulos – 3,927
Paul Azzarello – 996
Ed Ball – 736

Seneca Heights
Joan King (incumbent) – 11,290
Mary Fioro – 3,471
Bernadette Michael – 1,310

Scarborough Bluffs
Brian Ashton (incumbent) – 13,191
Randall Bentley – 4,953

Scarborough Wexford
Norm Kelly – 8,486
Michael Thompson – 4,003
Ralph Potter

Scarborough City Centre
Brian Harrison (incumbent) – 13,705
Worrick Russell – 4,966

Scarborough Highland Creek
Ken Morrish (incumbent) – 12,617
John Kruger – 7,116

Scarborough Agincourt
Scott Cavalier (incumbent) – 7,500
Anne McBride – 3,601
Colin Turnpenney – 1,808

Scarborough Malvern
Raymond Cho (incumbent) – 10,272
Diamond Tobin-West – 3,382
Yaqoob Khan – 1,807

York Eglinton
Caroline Di Giovanni – acclaimed

York Humber
Alan Tonks (incumbent) – 13,771
Stuart Weinstein – 4,395

== Toronto ==
=== Toronto mayor ===
In the City of Toronto, the most high-profile race was that for Mayor of Toronto in which incumbent June Rowlands was challenged by city councillor Barbara Hall, the first time a race for mayor had two female front-runners. Though the candidates were nominally independent, Rowlands was backed by the right-wing consisting of a coalition of right-wing Liberals and Progressive Conservatives (Rowlands was a member of the Liberal Party) while Hall was backed by New Democrats, left-wing Liberals, and Red Tories. Hall had been a member of the City NDP caucus on city council and had been an NDP candidate in the 1987 provincial election.

As a consequence of Jack Layton's failure to win the mayoralty as an official NDP candidate in the 1991 election, Hall preferred to run without a party label and included prominent Liberals such as George Smitherman on her campaign team.

Rowlands' tenure as mayor had resulted in criticism by many of her supporters, particularly those on the right. Her decision to ban the Barenaked Ladies, a rock band, from performing at Nathan Phillips Square because their name might be considered sexist was seen as both pandering to political correctness and evidence that she was out of touch with contemporary culture. Her allegedly slow response to a riot on Yonge Street following the acquittal of the police who beat Rodney King also made her appear out of touch.

Rowlands's campaign was hurt by the candidacy of Gerry Meinzer, a businessman and political novice who, though he never had the support or organization needed to win, succeeded in taking enough votes from the Rowlands' centre-right coalition to ensure her defeat.

1994 Toronto municipal election: Mayor of Toronto
Candidate	Votes	%
Barbara Hall	70,248	43.05
(x) June Rowlands	58,952	36.13
Gerry Meinzer	20,868	12.79
Jenny Friedland	2,858	1.75
Don Andrews	2,839	1.74
Ben Kerr	1,634	1.00
Lili Weemen	1,296	0.79
Lorna Houston	1,214	0.74
John Steele	1,200	0.74
Sam Bornstein	1,193	0.73
Bob Hyman	857	0.53
Total valid votes	163,159	100.00

Source: Toronto Elections, City of Toronto.

=== Toronto city council ===
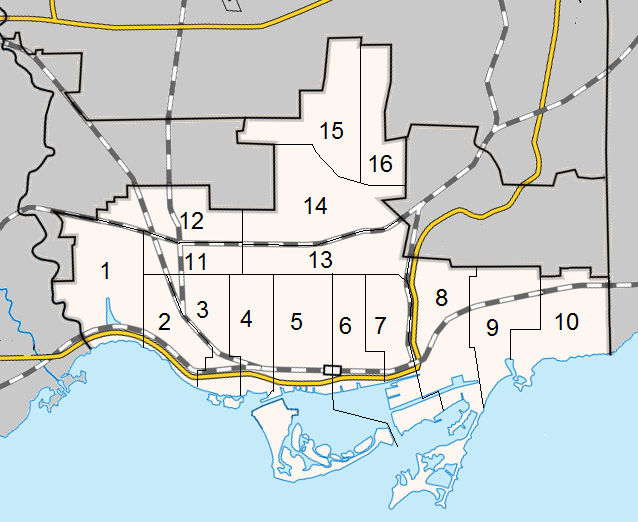
Ward boundaries used in the 1994 election

Ward 1 (Swansea and Bloor West Village)
David Hutcheon – 3,963
Al Chumak – 3,182
Nick Trainos – 2,251
Bill Roberts – 1,725
Myron Tymochko – 1,126
Greg Roberts – 168

Ward 2 (Parkdale
Chris Korwin-Kuczynski (incumbent) – 6,738
Steve Magwood – 1,624
Janet Fisher – 1,179

Ward 3 (Brockton)
Mario Silva – 2,976
Tony O'Donohue (incumbent) – 2,961
Fernando Dias Costa – 344
Bob Allisat – 247

Ward 4 (Trinity-Bellwoods and Little Italy)
Martin Silva (incumbent) – 3,881
Nick Figliano – 2,627
Hank Young – 500

Ward 5 (Financial District, Toronto – University of Toronto)
Dan Leckie – 4,342
Benson Lau – 3,546
Spiro Karagianis – 629

Ward 6 Downtown East
Kyle Rae (incumbent) – 6,601
Simon de Groot – 4,718

Ward 7 (Regent Park and Cabbagetown)
Pam McConnell – 2,678
Thomas Vegh – 2,528
Mike Armstrong – 1,186
Sarah Hood – 1,033
Brenda Kildey – 185

Ward 8 (Riverdale)
Peter Tabuns (incumbent) – 6,134
Arthur Potts – 4,319
Dan Salapoutis – 1,991
Michael Green – 716

Ward 9 (East Danforth)
Steve Ellis (incumbent) – 5,176
Michael Yorke – 2,673
Terry Brackett – 2,258

Ward 10 (The Beaches)
Tom Jakobek (incumbent) – 9,473
Will Molson – 1,952
Joe Cirone – 407
James Brookman – 259

Ward 11 (The Junction)
Rob Maxwell (incumbent) – 3,015
Antonino Lopes – 2,607
Dale Ritch – 970
John Gairy – 371
Sal David Romano – 244

Ward 12 (Davenport and Corso Italia)
Betty Disero (incumbent) – 6,360
Fred Dominelli – 2,937

Ward 13 (The Annex and Yorkville)
John Adams (incumbent) – 6,841
Paul Boreham – 2,422

Ward 14 (Forest Hill)
Howard Joy – 4,266
Howard Levine (incumbent) – 3,273
Stanley Taube – 2,589
Mona Kornberg – 871
Ron Robins – 200

Ward 15 (Western North Toronto)
Kay Gardner (incumbent) – 9,360
Sylvia Smith – 3,018

Ward 16 (Davisville and Lawrence Park)
Michael Walker (incumbent) – 8,543
Leslie Yager – 4,454

== East York ==
All incumbents running were easily re-elected. Mayor Prue was challenged by former councillor Bob Willis who felt that Prue hadn't done a good job but he came up well short. Case Ootes in Ward 1 ran for a seat on Metro Council allowing Michael Tziretas to win his seat. Paul Robinson, John Antonopolous, and Tim Cholvat were also newcomers.

† denotes incumbent from previous council

=== Mayor ===
- †Michael Prue, 15,620
- Bob Willis, 6,295
- Anne Sinclair, 1,403
- Kevin Clarke, 788
- June French, 648

=== Council ===
Two councillors elected in each ward.

Ward 1

- †Norm Crone, 3,036
- Michael Tziretas, 2,298
- Chris Perivolaris, 1,429
- Paul Taylor, 1,686
- Alex Parucha, 490

Ward 2

- †George Vasilopoulos, 3,614
- Paul Robinson, 2,749
- Jackie Aherne, 1,340
- Stena Kavanaugh, 735
- Helen Riley, 707
- Helen Andreou, 694
- Gerard Van Deelen, 525
- Andrew D. Lauder, 326
- William Richards, 274
- William D. Taylor, 272

Ward 3

- †Bob Dale, 2,570
- John Antonopoulos, 2,298
- Michael Wyatt, 1,776
- Tom Mangos, 1,016
- Frances Green, 565

Ward 4

- †Lorna Krawchuk, 4,250
- Tim Cholvat, 2,478
- Bernard Tanz, 2,411
- John Parker, 2,289
- Ian Cameron, 2,185

== Etobicoke ==
=== Mayor ===
Douglas Holyday 31,045
x-Bruce Sinclair 29,687
Norm Matusiak 10,508
Tom Hollinshead 1,910
Herman Jardine 1,146

=== Council ===
Ward 1
Irene Jones 2,383
Bob Gullins 1,947
Dave Sandford 1,306

Ward 2
Peter Milczyn 1,986
Dietmar Lein 1,491
Peter Ramos 670
Richard Ciupa 668
Donald Fraser 317
Bill Denning 288
Bob Currie 266
Jamil Ahmed 216
Jeffrey Weeks 189

Ward 3
Connie Micallef 2,073
Donald C. Kerr 1,582
Mark Elkin 1,541
Larry Faseruk 896
George Barroilhet 278

Ward 4
Michael O'Rourke 5,883
Stephen Boujikian 1,043

Ward 5
Brian Flynn 3,535
Anne Methot 2,531
Bob Hogarth 396
Jarret Florecki 327
John Formanek 234

Ward 6
Agnes Ugolini Potts 3,142
Ann Andrachuk 2,274
Jerry Taciuk 611
Paul Kipin 351

Ward 7
Gloria Luby 5,460
Martin Fraser 1,311

Ward 8
Mario Giansante 2,363
Avie Flaherty 1,961
Ray Morand 1,069
George Suhanic 834
Ken Lopez 466
Phillip Lazzarino 361
John Sumka 341
Ross Norris 336
Ron Pines 292
Darlene Gres 135

Ward 9
Alex Marchetti 2,916
Peter Kell 1,790
Edward M. Chop 569
Gaetano Savaglio 292

Ward 10
Brian Ineson 3,148
Allan Millard 2,607

Ward 11
Elizabeth Brown 1,906
Frank Quinn 1,453
Brian Khan 1,065

Ward 12
John Hastings 1,691
Vincent Crisanti 1,055
Adu K. Boakye 303
Anil Banerjee 275

== North York ==
Mel Lastman was re-elected mayor of the City. All incumbent councillors were re-elected except Judy Sgro who opted to run for Metro Council instead. Gina Severino replaced her as councillor for Ward 2.

=== Mayor ===
- Mel Lastman 96,279
- Julia McCrea 7,405
- Lennox Farrell 7,060

=== Council ===
Ward 1

- Mario Sergio 6,201
- Steve Pitt 2,481

Ward 2

- Gina Severino 3,944
- Jim Dervill 1,709
- Jim Susini 1,315
- Fluvio Sansoni 1,250

Ward 3

- Peter Li Preti 4,662
- Marcelo Ramirez 655
- Giacomo del Prete 596
- Robert Ragazzon 315

Ward 4

- Frank Di Giorgio acclaimed

Ward 5

- Mario Rizzo 5,908
- Linda Mommo 2,978
- Victoria Colby 741

Ward 6

- Milton Berger 4,506
- Dean Corrigan 1,673
- Albert Pantaleo 1,518

Ward 7

- Michael Feldman 7,437
- Michael Klein 1,451

Ward 8

- Joanne Flint acclaimed

Ward 9

- Ron Summers acclaimed

Ward 10

- Don Yuill 5,039
- Jim Carr 1,965
- Ralph Myers 1,884

Ward 11

- John Filion acclaimed

Ward 12

- Denzil Minnan-Wong 4,222
- Laurence Ritchie 3,267
- Mario Ribeiro 487
- Peter Nastamagou 396

Ward 13

- David Shiner acclaimed

Ward 14

- Paul Sutherland 7,039
- Rajendru Persaud 1,107

North York Board of Education (School Trustees)

Ward 8 Gerri Gershon

Ward 9 Shelley Stillman

== Scarborough ==
=== Mayor ===
- Faubert, Frank 54,885
- Mushinski, Marilyn 24,041
- Prinsloo, Maureen 17,376
- O'Malley, John 5,088
- French, Max 2,792
- Van Wyk, Abel 2,758

=== Councillors ===
Ward 1

- Barron, Harvey 4,915
- Droege, Wolfgang 802

Ward 2

- Altobello, Gerry Acclamation

Ward 3

- Tzekas, Mike 4,276
- Wardrope, John 2,547
- Page, George 1,297

Ward 4

- Berardinetti, Lorenzo 5,551
- Legault Sr, Georges 1,193

Ward 5

- Duguid, Brad 2,982
- Settatree, Bill 1,490
- Crawford, Paul 1,060
- Fermanis, Chris 627
- Walsh, Greg 517
- Faria, Ana Maria 300

Ward 6

- Mushinski, Paul 4,218
- Hughes, Brian 1,700
- Buhagair, Chris 1,053

Ward 7

- Johnson, Fred 6,545
- Green, Ed 1,675

Ward 8

- Soknacki, David 4,025
- De Baeremaeker, Glenn 3,229
- Wailoo, Zephine 382

Ward 9

- Moeser, Ron 7,576
- Lamanna, Tony 3,619
- Calandra, Paul 1,471

Ward 10

- Watson, Ron 4,809
- Persaud, Chandra 1,723

Ward 11

- Shaw, Sherene 3,197
- Lombardi, Don 2,272
- Lee, Chin 1,944

Ward 12

- Mahood, Doug 4,881
- Chan, Rosa 1,798
- Ngan, Peter 692

Ward 13

- Balkissoon, Bas 5,300
- Thomas, Michael 953
- Sapsford, Bruce 774
- Francois, Sonny 426

Ward 14

- Montgomery, Edith 5,663
- Dekort, Joe 2,302

== York ==
=== Mayor ===
- Frances Nunziata 20611 56.7%
- Fergy Brown 14195 39.1%
- Nancy Loewen 1519 4.2%

=== Council ===
Ward 1 – Roz Mendelson 57.5%

Ward 2 – Joe Mihevc 35.4%

Ward 3 – Rob Davis 45.2%

Ward 4 – Joan Roberts 40.3%

Ward 5 – Barry Rowland 44.4%

Ward 6 – Michael McDonald 74.5%

Ward 7 – Randy Leach 30.9%

Ward 8 – Bill Saundercook 2996 61.1% Margo Duncan 1905 38.9%

Metro Councillor Ward 21 – Caroline Di Giovanni (Acclamation)

Metro Councillor Ward 22 Alan Tonks 13759 76.2% Stuart Weinstein 4298 23.8%

School Board Ward 1 Ed Blackstock

School Board Ward 2 Pete Karageorgos

School Board Ward 3 Sam Wales

School Board Ward 4 Elizabeth Hill

School Board Ward 5 Joe Morriello

School Board Ward 6 Bonnie Taylor

School Board Ward 7 Bob Thomson

School Board Ward 8 Carl Miller
