= Adam Blackwell =

Canadian diplomat

Adam Blackwell was a Canadian diplomat. He served as the Secretary of Multidimensional Security at the Organization of American States (OAS). He was Ambassador of Canada to the Dominican Republic from 2002 to 2005.

== Career ==
Blackwell said he and Archbishop Romulo Emiliani were influential in stopping gang violence in Honduras. Also, he said "responses to crime and violence should be long-term actions to address their underlying causes" in a speech "at the opening ceremony of the Organisation of American States/Inter-American Drug Abuse Commission's (CICAD) First Regional Meeting - Caribbean Training and Certification Programme for Drug Prevention and Treatment Personnel."

== Honours ==
Blackwell was awarded the Grand Cross with Silver Breast Star of the Order of Merit of Duarte, Sánchez and Mella by the president of the Dominican Republic.

Diplomatic posts
Preceded by Bruno Picard	Ambassador Extraordinary and Plenipotentiary to the Dominican Republic; 2002-2005	Succeeded by Alvin Curling
