= Bas Balkissoon =

Canadian politician

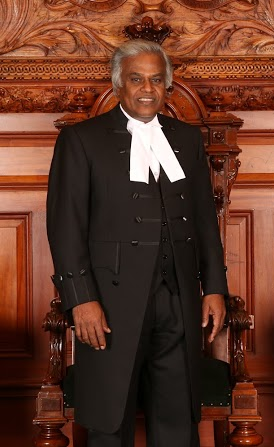
- Balkissoon in 2015 as Deputy Speaker

Ontario MPP
- In office November 24, 2005 – March 22, 2016
- Preceded by: Alvin Curling
- Succeeded by: Raymond Cho
- Constituency: Scarborough—Rouge River

Toronto City Councillor for Ward 41 Scarborough-Rouge River
- In office 2000–2005
- Preceded by: New riding
- Succeeded by: Paul Ainslie (interim); Chin Lee

Toronto City Councillor for Ward 18 Scarborough Malvern
- In office 1998–2000 Serving with Raymond Cho
- Preceded by: New riding
- Succeeded by: Riding abolished

Scarborough City Councillor for Ward 13
- In office 1988–1997
- Preceded by: Bob Sanders
- Succeeded by: Riding abolished

Personal details
- Born: 1952 or 1953 (age 73–74) Trinidad and Tobago
- Party: Liberal
- Spouse: Tahay Balkissoon
- Children: 3
- Portfolio: Deputy Speaker (2011-2016)

Bas Balkissoon (born 1952 or 1953) is a former politician in Ontario, Canada. He was a Liberal member of the Legislative Assembly of Ontario from 2005 to 2016 who represented the riding of Scarborough—Rouge River. From 1988 to 1997 he was a municipal councillor in Scarborough and from 1998 to 2005 he was a councillor in the amalgamated city of Toronto.

== Background ==
Born in Trinidad and Tobago, and of Indian descent, Balkissoon moved to Canada in 1970. He rose to prominence as the head of Scarborough Homeowners Alliance For Fair Taxes, an organization that challenged the province's property assessment system. He is married to Tahay and together they have raised three children. His son is married to Laura Jarrett, a co-anchor for NBC News's Saturday "Today" and daughter of Valerie Jarrett, who was a former senior advisor to U.S. President Barack Obama.

== City Councillor ==
In the 1988 municipal election, he was elected to Scarborough city council in what was then Ward 13; he was re-elected in 1991 and 1994. With the formation of the new amalgamated city of Toronto, he was elected to Toronto City Council in 1997 for Ward 18 Scarborough Malvern, serving alongside Raymond Cho. He was re-elected in 2000 and 2003 for Ward 41 Scarborough-Rouge River.

As chair of the city's Audit Committee he was credited with uncovering a dubious computer leasing deal between the city and MFP Financial, which eventually led to the formation of the Toronto Computer Leasing Inquiry. Balkissoon also served for a period on the Police Services Board on which he was critical of then-Toronto Police Chief Julian Fantino as well as the Toronto Police Association and its leader at the time, Craig Bromell.

== Ontario legislature ==
In a by-election held on November 24, 2005, Balkissoon was elected as the Member of Provincial Parliament for the riding of Scarborough—Rouge River, replacing Alvin Curling who was appointed as the Canadian ambassador to the Dominican Republic. Running for the Liberal Party, Balkissoon won with 58% of the vote. Conservative candidate Cynthia Lai received 24% of the vote and New Democrat Sheila White finished third with 15%. In the Liberal nomination prior to the by-election, the party chose to use a clause in its constitution that declared other candidates invalid, effectively handing the nomination to Balkissoon. This excluded other contenders such as Raymond Cho who considered putting his name forward.

Balkissoon was easily re-elected in the 2007 provincial election, defeating his closest opponent by over 17,000 votes. He was also re-elected in 2011, and 2014.

During his time in office he has been appointed to a number of Parliamentary Assistant roles including Minister of Community Safety and Correctional Services (2006-7, 2014); Minister of Health and Long-Term Care (2007–10); and Minister of Community and Social Services (2010-2013). In 2011 he was named as Deputy Speaker and Chair of the Committee of the Whole House.

He resigned from the legislature on March 22, 2016, citing a desire to spend more time with his family.

=== Electoral record ===
2014 Ontario general election
Party	Candidate	Votes	%	±%
Liberal	Bas Balkissoon	16,134	38.86	-3.01
New Democratic	Neethan Shan	12,863	30.98	-4.99
Progressive Conservative	Raymond Cho	11,491	27.68	+8.89
Green	George B. Singh	569	1.37	+0.12
None of the Above	Amir Khan	461	1.11	
Total valid votes		41,518	100.0	
Liberal hold		Swing		+0.99
Source: Elections Ontario

2011 Ontario general election
Party	Candidate	Votes	%	±%
Liberal	Bas Balkissoon	15,275	41.9	-23.3
New Democratic	Neethan Shan	13,130	36.0	+22.5
Progressive Conservative	Ken Kim	6,836	18.7	+4.2
Libertarian	Felix Liao	458	1.3	-0.1
Green	George Singh	448	1.2	-2.5
Family Coalition	Raphael Rosch	166	0.5	-1.2
Freedom	Daniel Walker	151	0.4	+0.4
Total valid votes		36,464	100.0	

2007 Ontario general election
Party	Candidate	Votes	%	±%
Liberal	Bas Balkissoon	22,362	65.2	+7.6
Progressive Conservative	Horace Gooden	4,962	14.5	-10.4
New Democratic	Sheila White	4,646	13.5	-1.4
Green	Serge Abbat	1,275	3.7	+2.5
Family Coalition	Joseph Carvalho	581	1.7	+1.1
Libertarian	Alan Mercer	492	1.4	+0.8

Ontario by-election, November 24, 2005
Party	Candidate	Votes	%	+/-
Liberal	Bas Balkissoon	9,347	57.6	-6.2
Progressive Conservative	Cynthia Lai	4,032	24.9	-0.3
New Democratic	Sheila White	2,425	14.9	+8.9
Green	Steven Toman	167	1.2	-2.3
Libertarian	Alan Mercer	100	0.6	-
Family Coalition	Rina Morra	93	0.6	-0.8
Freedom	Wayne Simmons	59	0.4	-
