= Paulette Senior =

Canadian politician

The Honourable Paulette Senior

Canadian Senator from Ontario
- Incumbent
- Assumed office 20 December 2023
- Nominated by: Justin Trudeau
- Appointed by: Mary Simon

Personal details
- Education: York University (BA)

Paulette Senior (born 1961 or 1962) is a Canadian politician and executive in the non-profit sector. She was CEO of the Canadian Women's Foundation and was previously CEO of YWCA Canada. She has a Bachelor of Arts in psychology and urban studies from York University. Senior was appointed to the Senate of Canada on the advice of Justin Trudeau on December 20, 2023.

Senior was an unsuccessful candidate for the Ontario New Democratic Party in the 1999 Ontario general election in Scarborough—Rouge River and for the New Democratic Party of Canada in the federal Scarborough—Rouge River riding in the 2000 Canadian federal election. She also ran unsuccessfully for Toronto city council in Ward 42 in the 2003 Toronto municipal election.
