= Thomas Leonard Wells =

Canadian politician (1930–2000)

Tom Wells
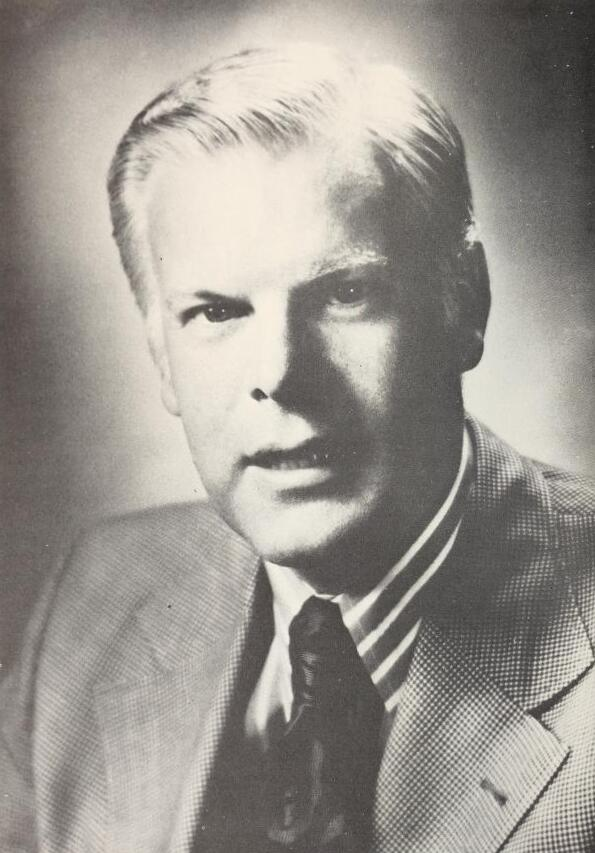
- Wells, c. 1972

Ontario MPP
- In office 1963–1985
- Preceded by: New riding
- Succeeded by: Alvin Curling
- Constituency: Scarborough North

Personal details
- Born: May 2, 1930 Toronto, Ontario
- Died: October 11, 2000 (aged 70) Toronto, Ontario
- Party: Progressive Conservative
- Occupation: Business executive
- Portfolio: Minister of Health (1969—1971), Minister of Social and Family Services (1971—1972), Minister of Education (1972—1978), Minister of Intergovernmental Affairs (1978—1985)

Thomas Leonard "Tom" Wells (May 2, 1930 – October 11, 2000) was a politician in Ontario, Canada. He served in the Legislative Assembly of Ontario as a member of the Progressive Conservative Party from 1963 to 1985 and was a cabinet minister in the governments of John Robarts and William Davis. There is also a school in Scarborough, Ontario named after him.

== Background ==
Wells was born in Toronto and educated at Victoria College and the University of Toronto. Wells and William Davis played on the University of Toronto's football team at the same time and were both members of the campus Progressive Conservative association. Wells worked as advertising manager for the Canadian Medical Association from 1960 to 1967. He also served on the Scarborough Board of Education from 1957 to 1963, was its chair in 1961–62, and held a concurrent position on the Metropolitan Toronto School Board in 1962–63.

== Politics ==
Wells was elected to the Ontario legislature in the 1963 provincial election, winning a comfortable victory in Scarborough North. Wells served as a backbench supported for three years, and was named a minister without portfolio on November 24, 1966. He was re-elected with a reduced majority in the 1967 election, defeating New Democratic Party candidate John Brewin by 1,527 votes.

Wells was promoted to Minister of Health on August 13, 1969, and was responsible for introducing Medicare to the province. In 1971, he was the only member of the Robarts cabinet to support Allan Lawrence's bid to succeed Robarts as Progressive Conservative Party leader and premier of Ontario. Lawrence lost to William Davis on the last ballot, by forty-four votes. When Davis succeeded Robarts as Premier of Ontario on March 1, 1971, he named Wells as his Minister of Social and Family Services.

Wells was re-elected again in the 1971 election, defeating Brewin for a second time by a greatly increased margin. He was promoted to Minister of Education on February 2, 1972. Shortly after his appointment, Wells permitted Ontario schoolchildren to watch the final game of the 1972 "Summit Series" ice hockey tournament between Canada and the Soviet Union from their classrooms. He defeated Liberal challenger Gerry Phillips by 2,677 votes in the 1975 election, and was returned by a greater majority again in 1977.

On August 16, 1978, Davis appointed Wells as his Minister of Intergovernmental Affairs. He was also appointed as Government House Leader in 1979. Both Wells and Davis were prominent supporters of Liberal Prime Minister Pierre Elliott Trudeau's plans to repatriate the Canadian Constitution, and were active in the negotiations that led to its adoption in 1982. Wells was re-elected with the largest plurality of his career in the 1981 election.

=== Cabinet positions ===
Davis ministry, Province of Ontario (1971–1985)
Cabinet posts (3)
Predecessor	Office	Successor
Darcy McKeough	Minister of Intergovernmental Affairs; 1978–1985	Frank Miller
Bob Welch	Minister of Education; 1972–1978	Bette Stephenson
John Yaremko	Minister of Social and Family Services; 1971–1972	Rene Brunelle
Robarts ministry, Province of Ontario (1961–1971)
Cabinet posts (2)
Predecessor	Office	Successor
Matthew Dymond	Minister of Health; 1969–1971	Bert Lawrence

== After politics ==
On January 17, 1985, Davis appointed Wells as Ontario's agent-general in London, UK. Because of this appointment, he remained neutral in the Progressive Conservative Party's February 1985 leadership convention. He remained as agent-general until 1992, and then returned to Toronto. In 1992, he led Toronto's unsuccessful bid to host Expo '98.

Wells died of cancer at Toronto's North York General Hospital in October 2000.

== Legacy ==
On February 23, 2005, the Toronto District School Board passed a motion moved by Scarborough-Rouge River School Trustee Noah Ng supported by the local school community to name the first school constructed by the Toronto District School Board after Thomas Leonard Wells. Thomas L. Wells Public School opened its doors for Junior Kindergarten to Grade Eight students on September 6, 2005. The school itself was honoured with an award in December 2005 by Canadian Architect Magazine.

A street within the Heathwood Community in Scarborough near the intersection of Birchmount Road and Sanwood Boulevard has been named after Thomas Leonard Wells. Ward 39, Scarborough-Agincourt City Councillor Mike Del Grande, recommended the name of Tom Wells Crescent for the new housing sub-division which was approved by Scarborough and Toronto City Council.
