= Scarborough North (provincial electoral district) =

Provincial electoral district in Ontario, Canada

Ontario electoral district
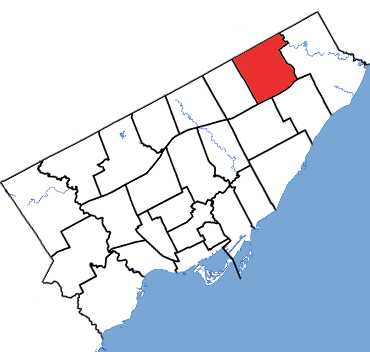
- Scarborough North in relation to the other Toronto ridings (2015 boundaries)
- Coordinates: 43.798°N 79.256°W

Provincial electoral district
- Legislature: Legislative Assembly of Ontario
MPP
Raymond Cho
Progressive Conservative
- District created: 1963
- First contested: 1963
- Last contested: 2025

Demographics
- Population (2021): 94,717
- Electors (2025): 66,703
- Area (km²): 31
- Pop. density (per km²): 3,055.4
- Census division: Toronto
- Census subdivision: Toronto

Scarborough North is a provincial riding in Ontario, Canada. It was originally created prior to the 1963 provincial election and eliminated in 1996, when most of its territory was incorporated into the ridings of Scarborough—Agincourt and Scarborough—Rouge River. For the 2018 provincial election, it was re-created from Scarborough—Agincourt and Scarborough—Rouge River. Scarborough North riding was originally created from part of the former riding of York—Scarborough. It is in the former borough of Scarborough.

Two Members of Provincial Parliament represented the riding during its original existence. The most notable was Alvin Curling who served as Speaker of the Legislature.

== Boundaries ==
On August 14, 2018, the province redrew municipal boundaries via the Better Local Government Act, 2018, S.O. 2018, c. 11 - Bill 5. This means that the 25 Provincial districts and the 25 municipal wards in Toronto currently share the same geographic borders.

Defined in legislation as: "Consisting of that part of the City of Toronto described as follows: commencing at the intersection of the northerly limit of said city with the Rouge River; thence generally southerly along said river to the electric power transmission line; thence westerly along said transmission line to Morningside Avenue; thence southerly along said avenue to Neilson Road; thence generally southerly along said road to Highway No. 401; thence westerly along said highway to Midland Avenue; thence northerly along said avenue to the northerly limit of said city; thence easterly along said limit to the point of commencement."

== History ==
The riding was created in 1963 through an amendment to the Representation Act. It formed the northwest part of the former riding of York—Scarborough. The riding was bordered by Lawrence Avenue to the south, Victoria Park Avenue to the west, Steeles Avenue to the north and Markham Road to the east.

In 1975, the boundary was significantly altered. The western boundary remained Victoria Park Avenue and the northern boundary of Steeles Avenue were retained. The eastern boundary was extended to the city limits at the edge of the Rouge River. The southern boundary was made as follows. Going east on Lawrence Avenue from Victoria Park Avenue it went to Birchmount Road. It headed north on Birchmount to Highway 401 and then continued east along the highway until it met the city limits.

In 1987 the boundary was altered again. The eastern border was shifted east to the CNR right-of-way east of Kennedy Road. The southern border became Highway 401 from the railway to the city limits. The northern and eastern borders remained the same.

== Members of Provincial Parliament ==
Scarborough North
Assembly	Years	Member	Party
Created from York—Scarborough in 1963
27th	1963–1967	Thomas Wells	Progressive Conservative
28th	1967–1971	Thomas Wells	Progressive Conservative
29th	1971–1975	Thomas Wells	Progressive Conservative
30th	1975–1977	Thomas Wells	Progressive Conservative
31st	1977–1981	Thomas Wells	Progressive Conservative
32nd	1981–1985	Thomas Wells	Progressive Conservative
33rd	1985–1987	Alvin Curling	Liberal
34th	1987–1990	Alvin Curling	Liberal
35th	1990–1995	Alvin Curling	Liberal
36th	1995–1999	Alvin Curling	Liberal
Sourced from the Ontario Legislative Assembly
Merged into Scarborough—Agincourt and Scarborough—Rouge River after 1996
Re-created from Scarborough—Agincourt and Scarborough—Rouge River in 2015
42nd	2018–2022	Raymond Cho	Progressive Conservative
43rd	2022–2025	Raymond Cho	Progressive Conservative
44th	2025–present	Raymond Cho	Progressive Conservative

== Electoral results ==
=== 2015 boundaries ===
Winning party in each polling division of Scarborough North at the 2025 Ontario general election

2025 Ontario general election
Party	Candidate	Votes	%	±%
Progressive Conservative	Raymond Cho	13,031	52.98	+4.67
Liberal	Anita Anandarajan	8,548	34.75	+5.14
New Democratic	Thadsha Navaneethan	2,554	10.38	–8.03
Green	Zdravko Gunjevic	465	1.89	+0.06
Total valid votes		24,598	99.46	
Total rejected, unmarked and declined ballots		134	0.54	+0.01
Turnout		24,732	37.00	–2.26
Eligible voters		66,842		
Progressive Conservative hold		Swing		–0.24
Source: Elections Ontario

Winning party in each polling division of Scarborough North at the 2022 Ontario general election

2022 Ontario general election
Party	Candidate	Votes	%	±%	Expenditures
Progressive Conservative	Raymond Cho	12,646	48.31	–2.74	$59,970
Liberal	Anita Anandarajan	7,750	29.61	+7.56	$27,802
New Democratic	Justin Kong	4,820	18.41	–5.98	$46,774
Green	Tara McMahon	479	1.83	+0.24	$0
New Blue	James Bountrogiannis	277	1.06	–	$1,067
Ontario Party	Pete Grusys	105	0.40	–	$0
None of the Above	Mark Dickson	100	0.38	–	$156
Total valid votes/expense limit		26,177	99.46	–	$93,845
Total rejected, unmarked and declined ballots		141	0.54	–0.30	
Turnout		26,318	39.26	–11.50	
Eligible voters		67,032			
Progressive Conservative hold		Swing		–5.15	
Source: Elections Ontario

2018 Ontario general election
Party	Candidate	Votes	%	±%
Progressive Conservative	Raymond Cho	17,413	51.05	+19.87
New Democratic	Dwayne Morgan	8,320	24.39	–1.75
Liberal	Chin Lee	7,519	22.04	–18.03
Green	Nicole Peltier	543	1.59	–0.01
Libertarian	Sean Morgan	318	0.93	–
Total valid votes		34,113	99.16	
Total rejected, unmarked and declined ballots		288	0.84	
Turnout		34,401	50.76	
Eligible voters		67,775		
Progressive Conservative notional gain from Liberal		Swing		+10.81
Source: Elections Ontario

2014 general election redistributed results
Party	Vote	%
Liberal	12,365	40.07
Progressive Conservative	9,623	31.18
New Democratic	8,067	26.14
Green	494	1.60
Others	313	1.01

=== 1987 electoral boundaries ===
1995 Ontario general election
Party	Candidate	Votes	%	±%
Liberal	Alvin Curling	15,507	46.08	+1.52
Progressive Conservative	Mike Thomas	10,508	31.22	+13.37
New Democratic	Tarek Fatah	6,431	19.11	–12.42
Freedom	Paul Blair	601	1.79	–
Family Coalition	Rina Morra	369	1.10	–2.89
Natural Law	Fred Fredeen	239	0.71	–
Total valid votes		33,655	98.95	
Total rejected, unmarked and declined ballots		358	1.05	–0.68
Turnout		34,013	58.67	+0.82
Eligible voters		57,970		
Liberal hold		Swing		–5.92
Source: Elections Ontario

1990 Ontario general election
Party	Candidate	Votes	%	±%
Liberal	Alvin Curling	13,393	44.56	–18.47
New Democratic	Victor Deane	9,477	31.53	+17.33
Progressive Conservative	Harold Adams	5,367	17.86	–0.60
Family Coalition	Louis L. Di Rocco	1,199	3.99	–0.33
Green	James Greig	620	2.06	–
Total valid votes		30,056	98.26	
Total rejected, unmarked and declined ballots		531	1.74	+1.26
Turnout		30,587	57.86	–1.89
Eligible voters		52,866		
Liberal hold		Swing		–17.90
Source: Elections Ontario

1987 Ontario general election
Party	Candidate	Votes	%	±%
Liberal	Alvin Curling	20,021	63.03	+15.52
Progressive Conservative	Peter Lam	5,861	18.45	–16.82
New Democratic	Nick Summers	4,509	14.20	+0.06
Family Coalition	Louis L. Di Rocco	1,371	4.32	–
Total valid votes		31,762	99.52	
Total rejected ballots		152	0.48	–0.25
Turnout		31,914	59.75	+2.22
Eligible voters		53,411		
Liberal hold		Swing		+16.17
Source: Elections Ontario

=== 1975 electoral boundaries ===
1985 Ontario general election
Party	Candidate	Votes	%	±%
Liberal	Alvin Curling	30,504	47.52	+21.75
Progressive Conservative	Carole Noble	22,644	35.27	–25.70
New Democratic	Jerry Daca	9,072	14.13	+0.88
Independent	R. J. Austin	1,974	3.08	–
Total valid votes		64,194	99.28	
Total rejected ballots		467	0.72	+0.18
Turnout		64,661	57.54	+4.57
Eligible voters		112,384		
Liberal gain from Progressive Conservative		Swing		+23.72
Source: Elections Ontario

1981 Ontario general election
Party	Candidate	Votes	%	±%
Progressive Conservative	Thomas Leonard Wells	29,961	60.98	+10.86
Liberal	Vera Jean Brookes	12,663	25.77	+1.17
New Democratic	Jerry Daca	6,512	13.25	–10.31
Total valid votes		49,136	99.46	
Total rejected ballots		266	0.54	+0.11
Turnout		49,402	52.96	–11.16
Eligible voters		93,279		
Progressive Conservative hold		Swing		+4.85
Source: Elections Ontario

1977 Ontario general election
Party	Candidate	Votes	%	±%
Progressive Conservative	Thomas Leonard Wells	20,988	50.11	+6.70
Liberal	Vera Jean Brookes	10,303	24.60	–11.77
New Democratic	Frank Lowery	9,868	23.56	+4.52
Libertarian	Marilee Haylock	721	1.72	+0.55
Total valid votes		41,880	99.57	
Total rejected ballots		181	0.43	+0.07
Turnout		42,061	64.12	–5.83
Eligible voters		65,593		
Progressive Conservative hold		Swing		+9.24
Source: Elections Ontario

1975 Ontario general election
Party	Candidate	Votes	%	±%
Progressive Conservative	Thomas Leonard Wells	16,512	43.41	–12.75
Liberal	Gerry Phillips	13,835	36.37	+22.36
New Democratic	Guy Beaulieu	7,241	19.04	–10.09
Libertarian	Robert Schultz	447	1.18	–
Total valid votes		38,035	99.64	
Total rejected ballots		138	0.36	+0.10
Turnout		38,173	69.95	–10.43
Eligible voters		54,568		
Progressive Conservative hold		Swing		–17.55
Source: Elections Ontario

=== 1963 electoral boundaries ===
1971 Ontario general election
Party	Candidate	Votes	%	±%
Progressive Conservative	Thomas Leonard Wells	24,982	56.16	+14.13
New Democratic	John Brewin	12,959	29.13	–7.42
Liberal	Bob Reid	6,235	14.02	–7.40
Independent	Arthur V. Wright	308	0.69	–
Total valid votes		44,484	99.74	
Total rejected ballots		116	0.26	–0.69
Turnout		44,600	80.39	+9.73
Eligible voters		55,480		
Progressive Conservative hold		Swing		+10.78
Source: Elections Ontario

1967 Ontario general election
Party	Candidate	Votes	%	±%
Progressive Conservative	Thomas Leonard Wells	11,729	42.03	–8.70
New Democratic	John Brewin	10,202	36.56	+12.08
Liberal	Lewis Milne Freeman	5,977	21.42	–3.38
Total valid votes		27,908	99.05	
Total rejected ballots		267	0.95	+0.17
Turnout		28,175	70.66	+13.20
Eligible voters		39,876		
Progressive Conservative hold		Swing		–10.39
Source: Elections Ontario

1963 Ontario general election
Party	Candidate	Votes	%
Progressive Conservative	Thomas Leonard Wells	9,918	50.73
Liberal	F. Les Callan	4,849	24.80
New Democratic	Angus Smith	4,785	24.47
Total valid votes		19,552	99.22
Total rejected ballots		154	0.78
Turnout		19,706	57.45
Eligible voters		34,300	
Progressive Conservative pickup new district.			
Source: Elections Ontario

== See also ==
- List of Ontario provincial electoral districts
- Canadian provincial electoral districts
