= Ray of Hope (2024 film) =

- Directed by: Nikki Cole; Ryan Singh
- Written by: Ryan Singh
- Produced by: Ryan Singh
- Starring: Rathika Sitsabaiesan; Sutha Shanmugarajah; Maya D'Elia; Collins Perinpanayagam
- Production company: Ryan Singh Productions Ltd
- Release date: 2024
- Running time: 120 minutes
- Country: Canada
- Languages: English; Tamil

Ray of Hope is a 2024 Canadian documentary film directed by Nikki Cole and Ryan Singh. The film chronicles the journey of Rathika Sitsabaiesan, a Tamil-Canadian woman who, after escaping the Sri Lankan civil war as a child, becomes an advocate for others affected by the conflict. The narrative interweaves stories of healing and triumph within the Tamil community.

In November 2024, the film's transcript was included as a part of the Academy Film Archive.

== Synopsis ==
The documentary follows Rathika Sitsabaiesan, who fled Sri Lanka's armed conflict at the age of five and resettled in Canada. As an adult, she emerges as a prominent advocate for those impacted by the war, intertwining her personal experiences with broader narratives of healing and resilience within the Tamil community.

== Production ==
Ray of Hope is produced by Ryan Singh Productions Ltd. The film features appearances by Rathika Sitsabaiesan, Sutha Shanmugarajah, Maya D'Elia, and Collins Perinpanayagam. Filming took place in various locations pertinent to the Tamil diaspora's experiences.

== Release ==
The film premiered in 2024 and was showcased at several film festivals, including:

- Hamilton Black Film Festival: Screened on May 25, 2024.
- Romford Film Festival (UK): Screening on May 27, 2024, with additional private screenings organized by the Tamil community.
- International Black Diversity Film Festival: Screened on May 30, 2024, at Keele Library in Toronto.
- Wyoming International Film Festival: Scheduled screening on July 14, 2024.

Additionally, the film had a theatrical run at the Warden and Eglinton Theatre from May 10 to May 16, 2024, with four daily showings.
