= Paul Ainslie =

City councillor in Toronto, Ontario, Canada

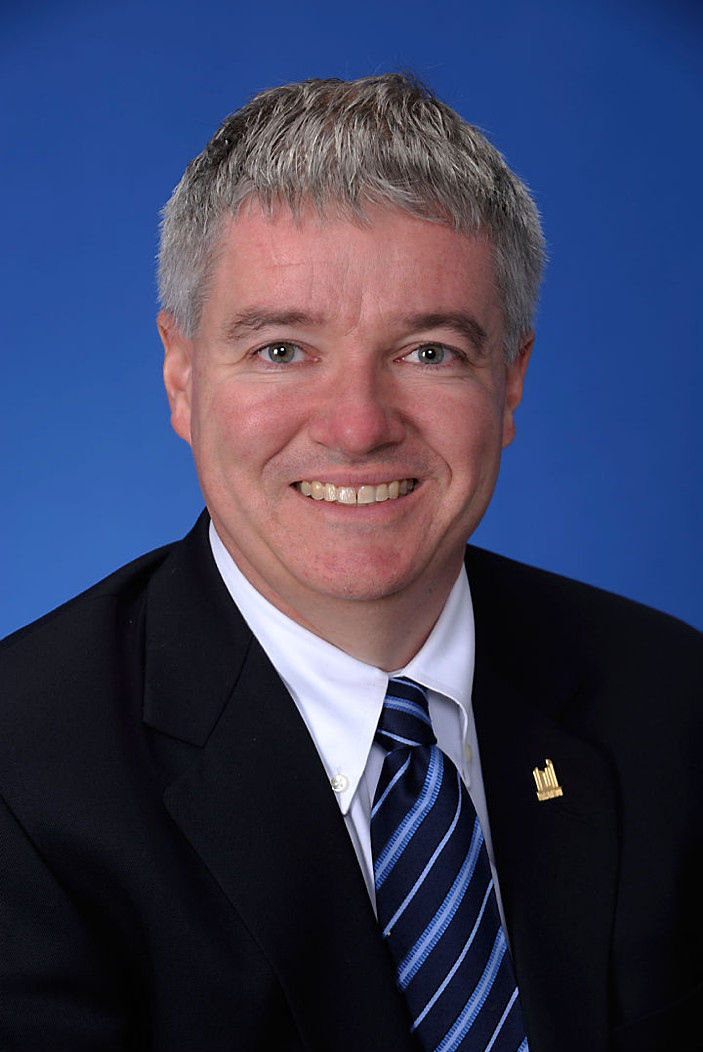
- Ainslie in 2010

Toronto City Councillor
- Incumbent
- Assumed office December 1, 2018
- Preceded by: Ward established
- Constituency: Ward 24 Scarborough—Guildwood
- In office December 1, 2006 – December 1, 2018
- Preceded by: David Soknacki
- Succeeded by: Ward abolished
- Constituency: Ward 43 Scarborough East
- In office February 1, 2006 – December 1, 2006
- Preceded by: Bas Balkissoon
- Succeeded by: Chin Lee
- Constituency: Ward 41 Scarborough—Rouge River

Chair of the Toronto Transit Commission
- Incumbent
- Assumed office November 19, 2026
- Mayor: Olivia Chow
- Preceded by: Jamaal Myers

Deputy Mayor of Toronto for Scarborough
- Incumbent
- Assumed office May 21, 2025
- Mayor: Olivia Chow
- Preceded by: Jennifer McKelvie

Chair of the Scarborough Community Council
- In office December 1, 2010 – December 31, 2012
- Preceded by: Michael Del Grande
- Succeeded by: Michelle Berardinetti

Personal details
- Born: February 4, 1967 (age 59) Scarborough, Ontario, Canada
- Party: Independent
- Spouse: Janet Ainslie
- Children: 3
- Website: www.paulainslie.com

Paul Ainslie (/ˈeɪnzli/ AYNZ-lee; born February 4, 1967) is a Canadian politician who has been a member of Toronto City Council since 2006 and deputy mayor of Toronto for Scarborough since 2025. Ainslie has been the chair of the Toronto Transit Commission (TTC) since 2026.

Ainslie joined city council in 2006 whern he was appointed by council to fill a vacancy in Ward 41 Scarborough—Rouge River in 2006. He was later was elected as councillor for Ward 43 Scarborough East that year. He has been the councillor for Ward 24 Scarborough—Guildwood since 2018.

== Political career ==
On February 1, 2006, City Council appointed Ainslie to fill the vacancy in Ward 41 that was created when Bas Balkissoon was elected to the Legislative Assembly of Ontario in a by-election. A condition of the appointment was that he would not run as a candidate in the 2006 election. However, when Councillor David Soknacki announced his intention not to run in Ward 43, Ainslie put his name forward as a candidate to replace him. Ainslie was an executive assistant to Soknacki, and Soknacki supported Ainslie's candidacy.

During the election campaign in 2006, a video surfaced which showed Ainslie promising to Toronto City Council not to run. "I will not run in Ward 41, or any other ward in the city." His campaign literature urged voters to "return" him to city hall. He said that his campaign team suggested using the word "re-elect". Ainslie said, "I didn't think it was proper." Despite the controversy, he was elected in Ward 43.

In April 2007, he determined that it costs $20,000 annually to provide councillors and staff at City Hall offices with free coffee every day. He moved a motion in committee to remove the expense, but it failed to pass.

During the Rob Ford drug allegation scandal, Ainslie was removed as chair from the city's government management committee and appointed as chair of the parks and environment committee. On October 11, 2013, he resigned from the mayor's executive committee and his role as chair of the parks and environment committee over differences with Ford's longterm strategic direction for the city.

On May 3, 2013, Ainslie was stopped by a RIDE check on Kingston Road and was given a three-day licence suspension.

In 2025, Ainslie came under controversy after his social media account made suggestive comments on posts.

In May 2025, Mayor Olivia Chow appointed Ainslie deputy mayor for Scarborough, succeeding Jennifer McKelvie following her resignation from council. Ainslie also served as chair of the General Government Committee and as the city's night economy champion.

In the 2026 Toronto municipal election, Ainslie was re-elected in Ward 24 Scarborough—Guildwood with 20,305 votes (72.26 per cent), defeating five other candidates. He was endorsed by ABC Toronto, a conservative municipal advocacy group. Following the election, Mayor Chow selected Ainslie to be chair of the TTC.

== Election results ==
2026 Toronto municipal election, Ward 24 Scarborough—Guildwood
Candidate	Votes	%
Paul Ainslie (X)	20,305	72.26
Robert Bazil	2,590	9.22
Nachi Ramasamy	2,055	7.31
Arun Sivanandan	1,508	5.37
An Wu	1,265	4.50
Jithender Mulamalla	377	1.34
Total	28,100	100.00

2022 Toronto municipal election, Ward 24 Scarborough—Guildwood
Candidate	Votes	%
Paul Ainslie (X)	12,483	76.52
Vivian Parker	1,820	11.16
Habiba Desai	1,307	8.01
Keiosha Ross	703	4.31
Total	16,313	100.00

2018 Toronto election, Ward 24
Candidate	Votes	%
Paul Ainslie	15,131	66.82%
Michelle Spencer	1,933	8.54%
Priyanth Nallaratnam	1,896	8.38%
Reddy Muttukuru	1,323	5.85%
Sajid Saleh	841	3.71%
Morlan Washington	592	2.62%
Keiosha Ross	405	1.79%
Emery Warner	393	1.74%
Itohan Evbagharu	132	0.58%
Total	22,646	100%

2014 Toronto election, Ward 43
Candidate	Votes	%
Paul Ainslie	12,358	74.3%
Harris Mark	1,750	10.5%
Jason Colterman	1,437	8.6%
Bartley Alonzo	799	4.8%
Kodanipork Andi	283	1.7%
Total	16,627	100%

2010 Toronto election, Ward 43
Candidate	Votes	%
Paul Ainslie	9,334	60.6%
John Laforet	4,440	28.8%
Bhaskar Sharma	758	4.9%
Benjamin Mbaegbu	489	3.18%
Samuel Getachew	392	2.5%
Total	15,413	100%

2006 Toronto election, Ward 43
Candidate	Votes	%
Paul Ainslie	4,677	38.7%
Jim Robb	3,388	28.1%
Abdul Patel	1,738	14.4%
John Laforet	933	7.7%
Mujeeb Khan	495	4.1%
Glenn Kitchen	495	4.1%
Amarjeet Chhabra	351	2.9%
Total	12,077	100%
