= Scarborough—Rouge River (provincial electoral district) =

Coordinates: 43.826°N 79.197°W

Ontario electoral district
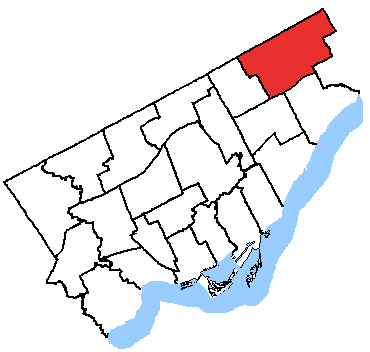
- Scarborough—Rouge River in relation to the other Toronto ridings

Defunct provincial electoral district
- Legislature: Legislative Assembly of Ontario
- District created: 1999
- District abolished: 2018
- First contested: 1999
- Last contested: 2016

Demographics
- Population (2011): 135,102
- Electors (2011): 85,505
- Area (km²): 51.17
- Census division: Toronto
- Census subdivision: Toronto

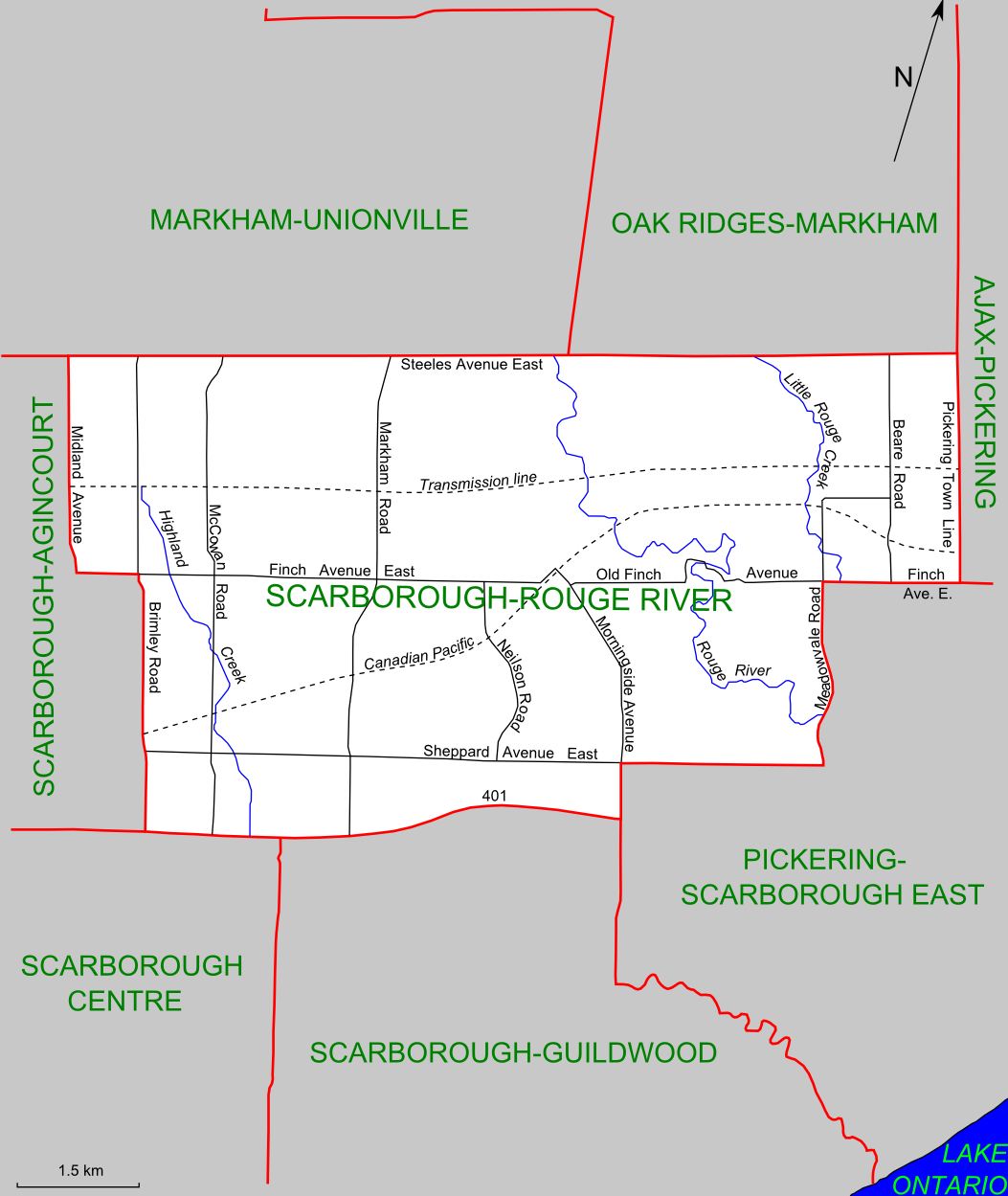
Map of Scarborough-Rouge River

Scarborough—Rouge River was a provincial electoral district in Ontario, Canada, that was represented in the Legislative Assembly of Ontario between 1999 and 2018.

The riding covers the northeast part of the Scarborough part of Toronto. It stretches from Highway 401 in the south to Steeles Avenue in the north. In the east it ends at the border with Pickering and to just west of Midland in the west.

In 2018, the district was dissolved into Scarborough—Rouge Park and Scarborough North.

== Demographics ==
According to the 2011 Canadian census

- Ethnic groups: 32.8% South Asian, 30.8% Chinese, 10.7% Black, 8.7% White, 8.2% Filipino, 1.6% Southeast Asian
- Languages: 40.0% English, 27.1% Chinese, 13.2% Tamil, 4.2% Tagalog, 3.0% Urdu, 2.4% Gujarati, 1.4% Punjabi
- Religion: 39.2% Christian (19.1% Catholic, 2.7% Pentecostal, 2.4% Anglican, 1.8% Baptist, 1.1% Christian Orthodox, 12.1% Other Christian), 20.7% Hindu, 8.9% Muslim, 4.7% Buddhist, 1.2% Sikh, 25.0% No religion.
- Average household income: $74,241
- Median household income: $61,786
- Average individual income: $28,328
- Median individual income: $21,187

In 2001, 13.6% of the population was Hindu, the highest in Canada.

== Geography ==
Scarborough—Rouge River consisted of the part of the City of Toronto bounded on the north and east by the city limits, on the west by Midland Avenue, and on the south by a line drawn from the east city limit west along Finch Avenue East, south along Meadowvale Road, west along Sheppard Avenue East, south along Morningside Avenue, west along Highway 401, north along Brimley Road, and west along Finch Avenue East to Midland Avenue.

The provincial electoral district was created in 1999 when provincial ridings were defined to have the same borders as federal ridings.

The riding contained the neighbourhoods of Agincourt (part), Armadale, Malvern, Milliken (part) and Morningside Heights.

== Members of Provincial Parliament ==
Scarborough—Rouge River
| Assembly | Years | Member | Party |
|---|---|---|---|
Riding created from Scarborough North
| 37th | 1999–2003 | Alvin Curling | Liberal |
| 38th | 2003–2005 | Alvin Curling | Liberal |
| 38th | 2005–2007 | Bas Balkissoon | Liberal |
| 39th | 2007–2011 | Bas Balkissoon | Liberal |
| 40th | 2011–2014 | Bas Balkissoon | Liberal |
| 41st | 2014–2016 | Bas Balkissoon | Liberal |
| 41st | 2016–2018 | Raymond Cho | Progressive Conservative |
Riding dissolved into Scarborough—Rouge Park and Scarborough North
Sourced from the Ontario Legislative Assembly

== Election results ==
Ontario provincial by-election, September 1, 2016 Resignation of Bas Balkissoon
| Party | Candidate | Votes | % | ±% |
|---|---|---|---|---|
| Progressive Conservative | Raymond Cho | 9,687 | 38.57 | +10.92 |
| Liberal | Piragal Thiru | 7,263 | 28.92 | –9.78 |
| New Democratic | Neethan Shan | 6,907 | 27.50 | –3.80 |
| Independent | Queenie Yu | 580 | 2.31 | – |
| Green | Priyan De Silva | 217 | 0.86 | –0.51 |
| Libertarian | Allen Small | 146 | 0.58 | – |
| None of the Above | Above Znoneofthe | 135 | 0.54 | –0.42 |
| Freedom | Wayne Simmons | 60 | 0.24 | – |
| People's Political Party | Dwight McLean | 45 | 0.18 | – |
| Pauper | John Turmel | 37 | 0.15 | – |
| Trillium | Ania Krosinska | 36 | 0.14 | +0.00 |
| Total valid votes | | 25,113 | 99.49 | |
| Total rejected, unmarked and declined ballots | | 130 | 0.52 | –0.62 |
| Turnout | | 25,243 | 28.01 | –19.47 |
| Eligible voters | | 90,118 | | |
| Progressive Conservative gain from Liberal | | Swing | | +10.36 |
Source: Elections Ontario

2014 Ontario general election
| Party | Candidate | Votes | % | ±% |
|---|---|---|---|---|
| Liberal | Bas Balkissoon | 16,095 | 38.71 | –3.17 |
| New Democratic | Neethan Shan | 13,019 | 31.31 | –4.66 |
| Progressive Conservative | Raymond Cho | 11,500 | 27.66 | +8.87 |
| Green | George B. Singh | 571 | 1.37 | +0.12 |
| None of the Above | Amir Khan | 398 | 0.96 | – |
| Total valid votes | | 41,583 | 98.86 | |
| Total rejected, unmarked and declined ballots | | 479 | 1.14 | +0.55 |
| Turnout | | 42,062 | 47.48 | +4.58 |
| Eligible voters | | 88,592 | | |
| Liberal hold | | Swing | | +0.75 |
Source: Elections Ontario

2011 Ontario general election
| Party | Candidate | Votes | % | ±% |
|---|---|---|---|---|
| Liberal | Bas Balkissoon | 15,237 | 41.87 | –23.18 |
| New Democratic | Neethan Shan | 13,088 | 35.97 | +22.29 |
| Progressive Conservative | Ken Kim | 6,837 | 18.79 | +4.32 |
| Libertarian | Felix Liao | 457 | 1.26 | –0.16 |
| Green | George B. Singh | 455 | 1.25 | –2.47 |
| Family Coalition | Raphael Rosch | 166 | 0.46 | –1.20 |
| Freedom | Daniel Walker | 150 | 0.41 | – |
| Total valid votes | | 36,390 | 99.41 | |
| Total rejected, unmarked and declined ballots | | 215 | 0.59 | –0.73 |
| Turnout | | 36,605 | 42.89 | +1.07 |
| Eligible voters | | 85,338 | | |
| Liberal hold | | Swing | | –22.73 |
Source: Elections Ontario

2007 Ontario general election
| Party | Candidate | Votes | % | ±% |
|---|---|---|---|---|
| Liberal | Bas Balkissoon | 22,307 | 65.06 | +0.49 |
| Progressive Conservative | Horace Gooden | 4,960 | 14.47 | –9.78 |
| New Democratic | Shiela White | 4,691 | 13.68 | +7.57 |
| Green | Serge Abbat | 1,276 | 3.72 | – |
| Family Coalition | Joseph Carvalho | 569 | 1.66 | – |
| Libertarian | Alan Mercer | 486 | 1.42 | – |
| Total valid votes | | 34,289 | 98.68 | |
| Total rejected, unmarked and declined ballots | | 457 | 1.32 | |
| Turnout | | 34,746 | 41.82 | |
| Eligible voters | | 83,086 | | |
| Liberal notional hold | | Swing | | +5.14 |
Source: Elections Ontario

^ Change is from 2003 redistributed results.

2003 general election redistributed results
| Party | Vote | % |
|---|---|---|
| Liberal | 24,470 | 64.57 |
| Progressive Conservative | 7,688 | 24.25 |
| New Democratic | 1,936 | 6.11 |
| Others | 1,609 | 5.08 |

Ontario provincial by-election, November 24, 2005 Resignation of Bas Balkissoon
| Party | Candidate | Votes | % | ±% |
|---|---|---|---|---|
| Liberal | Bas Balkissoon | 9,327 | 56.51 | –7.33 |
| Progressive Conservative | Cynthia Lai | 4,268 | 25.86 | +0.65 |
| New Democratic | Sheila White | 2,437 | 14.77 | +8.79 |
| Family Coalition | Rina Morra | 183 | 1.11 | –0.32 |
| Green | Steven P. Toman | 135 | 0.82 | –2.71 |
| Libertarian | Alan Mercer | 100 | 0.61 | – |
| Freedom | Wayne Simmons | 54 | 0.33 | – |
| Total valid votes | | 16,504 | 99.40 | |
| Total rejected, unmarked and declined ballots | | 99 | 0.60 | –0.20 |
| Turnout | | 16,603 | 19.35 | –28.74 |
| Eligible voters | | 85,804 | | |
| Liberal hold | | Swing | | –3.99 |
Source: Elections Ontario

2003 Ontario general election
| Party | Candidate | Votes | % | ±% |
|---|---|---|---|---|
| Liberal | Alvin Curling | 23,976 | 63.85 | +6.60 |
| Progressive Conservative | Kevin Moore | 9,468 | 25.21 | –9.22 |
| New Democratic | Jean-Paul Yovanoff | 2,246 | 5.98 | –0.12 |
| Green | Karen MacDonald | 1,326 | 3.53 | – |
| Family Coalition | Mitchel Andrew Persaud | 536 | 1.43 | +0.03 |
| Total valid votes | | 37,552 | 99.20 | |
| Total rejected, unmarked and declined ballots | | 303 | 0.80 | –0.33 |
| Turnout | | 37,855 | 48.09 | –4.69 |
| Eligible voters | | 78,710 | | |
| Liberal hold | | Swing | | +7.91 |
Source: Elections Ontario

1999 Ontario general election
| Party | Candidate | Votes | % |
|---|---|---|---|
| Liberal | Alvin Curling | 20,052 | 57.25 |
| Progressive Conservative | Mubashar Dar | 12,061 | 34.44 |
| New Democratic | Paulette Senior | 2,138 | 6.10 |
| Family Coalition | Betty Peters | 489 | 1.40 |
| Natural Law | Louis Dubé | 284 | 0.81 |
| Total valid votes | | 35,024 | 98.87 |
| Total rejected, unmarked and declined ballots | | 402 | 1.13 |
| Turnout | | 35,426 | 52.78 |
| Eligible voters | | 67,118 | |
| Liberal pickup new district. | | | |
Source: Elections Ontario

== 2007 electoral reform referendum ==
2007 Ontario electoral reform referendum
| Side | Votes | % |
|---|---|---|
| First Past the Post | 18,271 | 55.2 |
| Mixed member proportional | 14,856 | 44.8 |
| Total valid votes | 33,127 | 100.0 |

== Sources ==
- Elections Ontario Past Election Results
- "Scarborough-Rouge River - Ontario Votes 2011 - CBC News". CBC News. 7 October 2011.
- "Elections Ontario - 2011 General Election Results By District". Elections Ontario. 7 October 2011.
