= Alvin Curling =

Jamaican-born Canadian politician

The Honourable Alvin Curling ECO
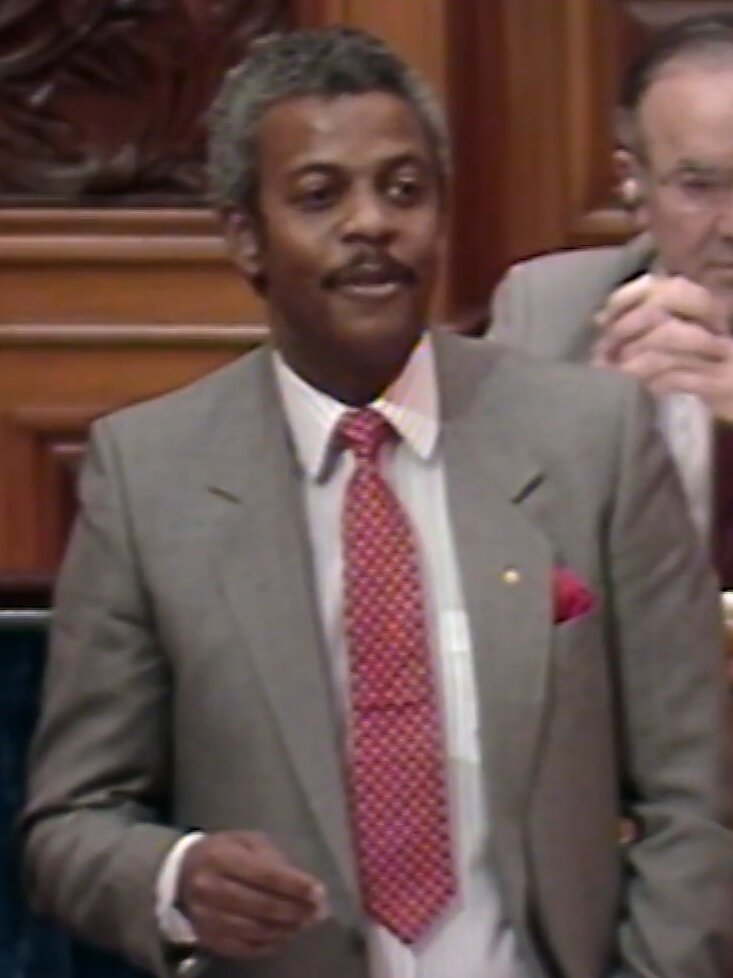
- Curling in 1986

Ontario MPP
- In office 1999–2005
- Preceded by: Riding established
- Succeeded by: Bas Balkissoon
- Constituency: Scarborough—Rouge River
- In office 1985–1999
- Preceded by: Thomas Leonard Wells
- Succeeded by: Riding dissolved
- Constituency: Scarborough North

38th Speaker of the Legislative Assembly of Ontario
- In office November 19, 2003 – August 19, 2005
- Preceded by: Gary Carr
- Succeeded by: Michael A. Brown

Canada's ambassador to the Dominican Republic
- In office 2005–2006
- Preceded by: Adam Blackwell
- Succeeded by: Patricia Fortier

Personal details
- Born: November 15, 1939 (age 87) Kingston, Jamaica
- Party: Liberal
- Occupation: Educator, diplomat

Alvin Curling (born November 15, 1939) is a Jamaican-born Canadian politician. He was Canada's envoy to the Dominican Republic from 2005 to 2006. A former politician in Ontario, Canada, he was Speaker of the Legislative Assembly of Ontario until he resigned on August 19, 2005 to accept his diplomatic appointment. He had been a Liberal MPP for twenty years, from 1985 to 2005.

== Background ==
Curling was educated at Seneca College and at York University in Toronto. He began working as an educator in 1972, and served as President of the World Literacy of Canada organization from 1981 to 1984, as well as working in the Jamaican Canadian Association.

== Politics ==
=== In government ===
He was elected to the Ontario legislature in the provincial election of 1985 as a Liberal in the suburban Toronto riding of Scarborough North. Curling defeated Progressive Conservative candidate Carole Noble by about 8,000 votes. His personal total of 30,504 votes was a provincial record at the time. He was the second person-of-colour elected to the Ontario legislature after Leonard Braithwaite, and was the sole visible minority member during his first term.

The Liberals formed a minority government after this election, and Curling was appointed Minister of Housing on June 26, 1985. He was the first Black Canadian to hold a cabinet-level position in Ontario. During his time as minister of Housing, he expanded the parameters of Ontario's rent control program, and announced a $500 million initiative for new urban housing. Curling was easily re-elected in the provincial election of 1987, and was appointed Minister of Skills Development on September 29, 1987. He served in this capacity until August 2, 1989, when he was dropped from cabinet.

==== Cabinet positions ====
Peterson ministry, Province of Ontario (1985–1990)
Cabinet posts (2)
Predecessor	Office	Successor
Greg Sorbara	Minister of Skills Development; 1987–1989	Sean Conway
Dennis Timbrell (Note: Ministry split in 1985 between Municipal Affairs Minister Bernard Grandmaitre and Curling.)	Minister of Housing; 1985–1987	Chaviva Hošek

=== In opposition ===
The Liberals were defeated by the NDP in the 1990 election, although Curling managed to retain his riding by about 4,000 votes. He was also re-elected without much difficulty in the face of Progressive Conservative majority governments of 1995 and 1999 in the redistributed riding of Scarborough—Rouge River. From 1996 to 1999, he served as Deputy House Leader for the Liberals.

In December 1995, he gained notoriety for his 18-hour filibuster-like protest against the Mike Harris government's Omnibus Bill 26. When Curling was ordered expelled from the legislature for refusing to vote, he was ordered by the speaker to leave the chamber. He refused to leave his seat, and a knot of fellow Liberal and NDP opposition members formed a cordon around him to prevent his physical removal. The standoff lasted throughout the night and into the next morning when the house was adjourned. Reports stated that when legislature staff saw Frances Lankin, NDP MPP and a former prison guard, among the cordon, they backed off. Curling claimed his protest was meant to highlight a lack of public consultation in the Harris government's bill. The incident led to a discussion amongst the party house leaders and an agreement was reached to review the bill clause by clause.

Curling supported Joseph Cordiano for the Ontario Liberal Party leadership in 1996 (Ottawa Citizen, November 21, 1996).

== After politics ==
Curling resigned his seat in the Legislative Assembly on August 19, 2005, to accept a diplomatic posting as Canada's ambassador to the Dominican Republic. He was recalled from this position in 2006 following the defeat of the federal Liberal government.

Curling held a position as Senior Fellow at the Centre for International Governance Innovation (CIGI) in Waterloo, Ontario, from June 2007 until May 2010. He also served as Co-Chair of the Premier's Task Force on the Review of the Roots of Youth Violence. In the mid-2000s, Curling was honoured by the government of Jamaica with the Order of Distinction; he holds the rank of Commander. In 2014, he was made a Member of the Order of Ontario for having "played an important role in shaping government policy addressing youth violence".
