= Scarborough—Rouge River (federal electoral district) =

Former federal electoral district in Ontario, Canada

Coordinates: 43.826°N 79.197°W

Ontario electoral district
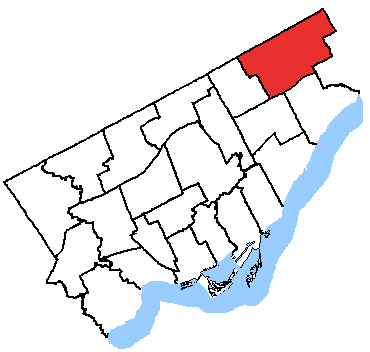
- Scarborough—Rouge River in relation to the other Toronto ridings

Defunct federal electoral district
- Legislature: House of Commons
- District created: 1987
- District abolished: 2013
- First contested: 1988
- Last contested: 2011
- District webpage: profile, map

Demographics
- Population (2011): 135,102
- Electors (2011): 85,505
- Area (km²): 51.17
- Census division: Toronto
- Census subdivision: Toronto

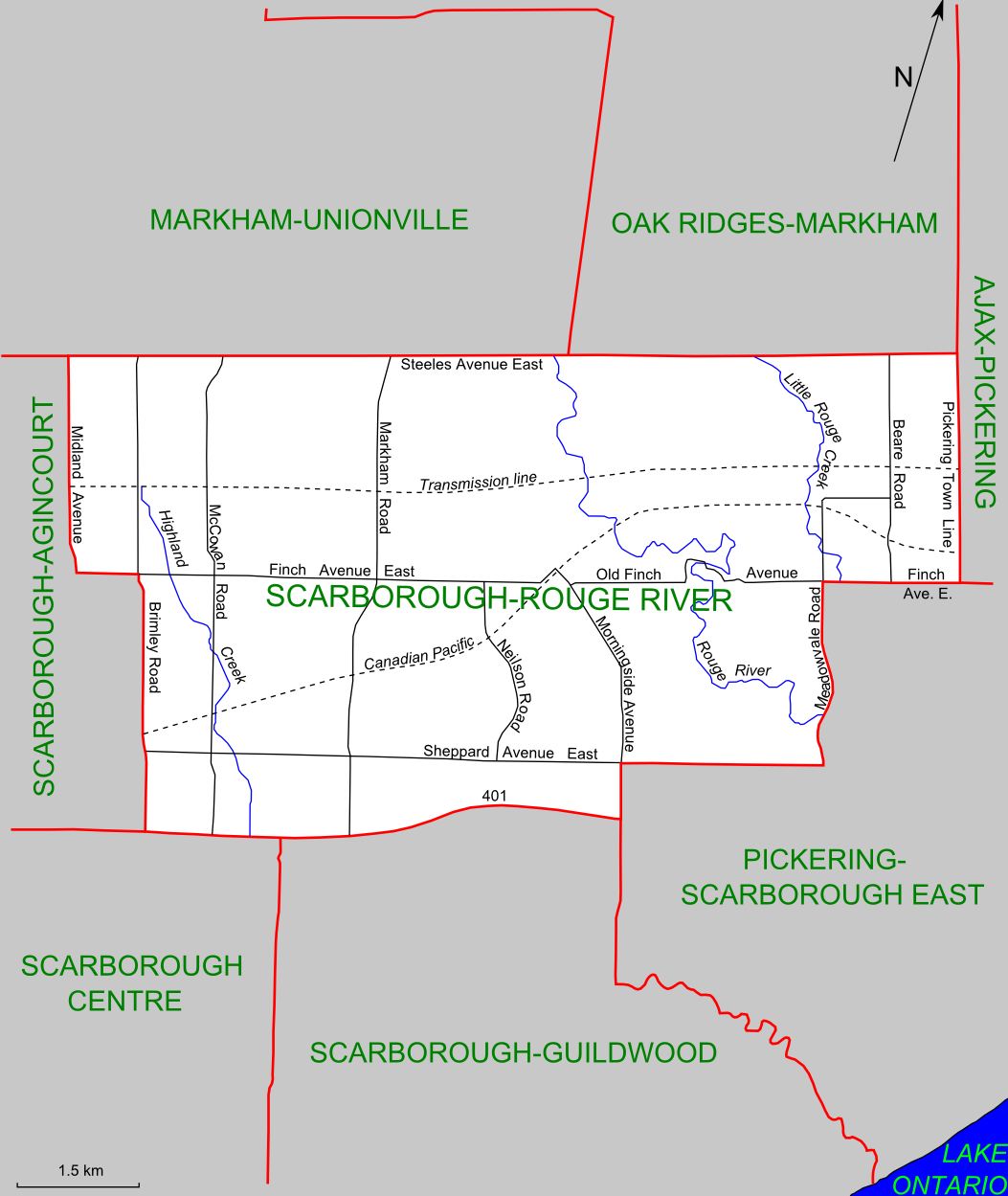
Map of Scarborough-Rouge River

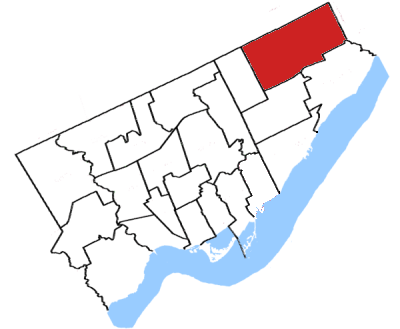
The former borders of Scarborough—Rouge River, in place from 1996 to 2004. These borders are still those represented in the Ontario legislature and on Toronto city council

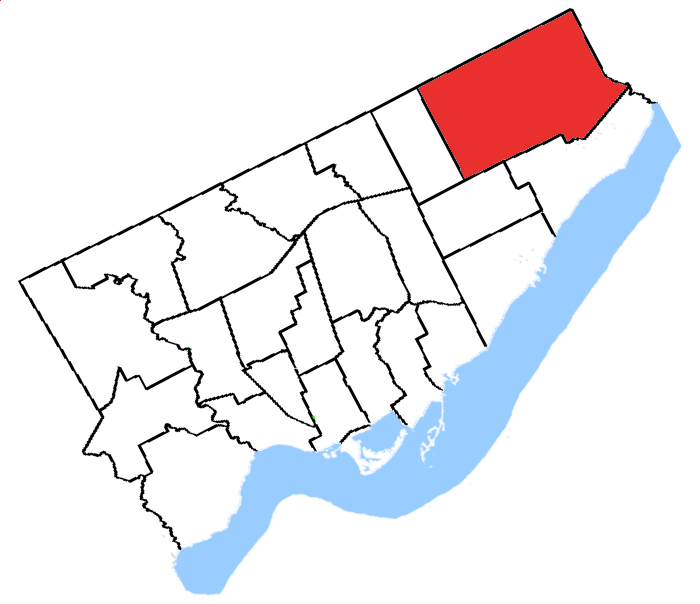
The borders of Scarborough—Rouge River, in place from 1987 to 1996

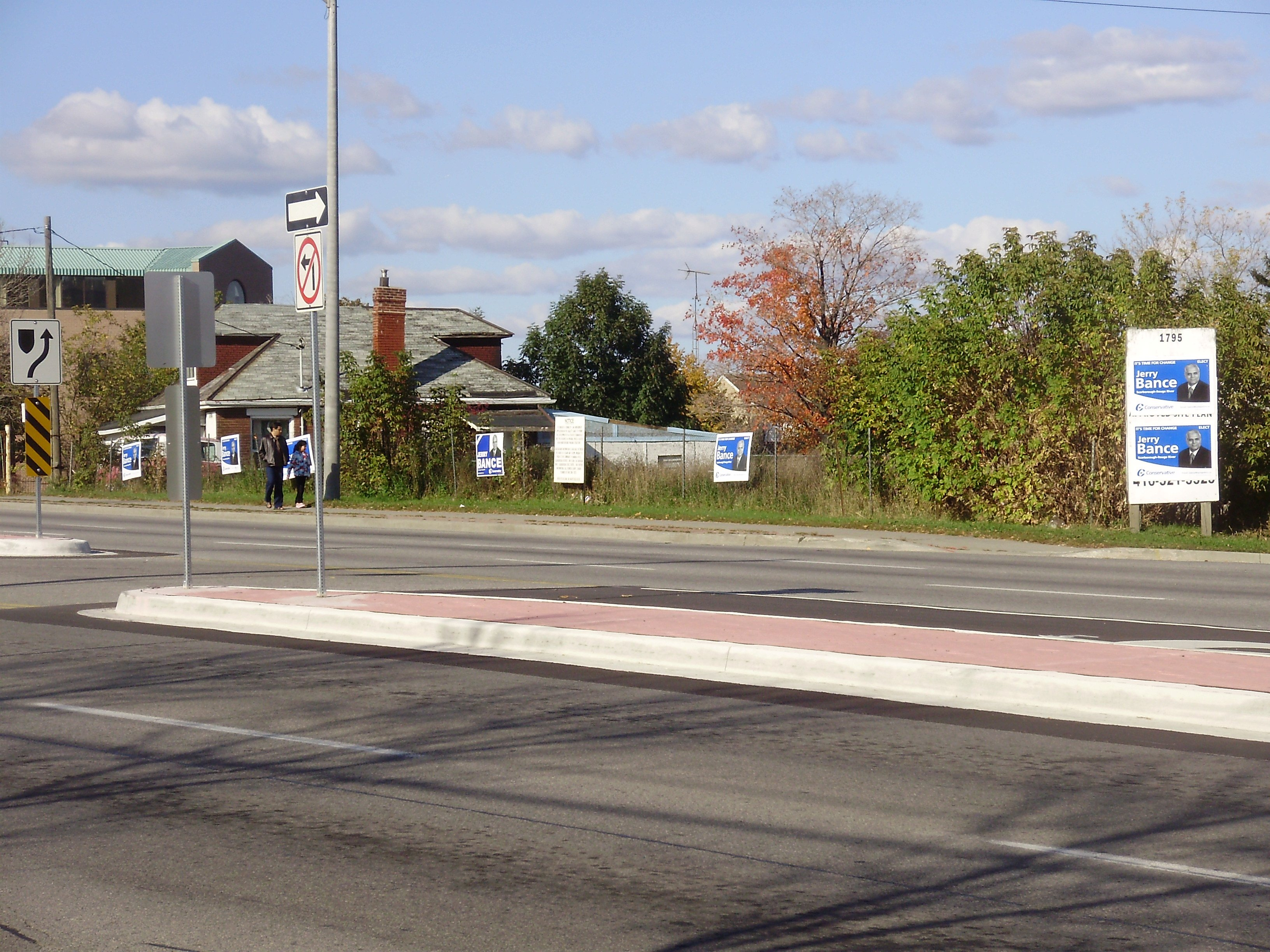
Conservative signs remain on Markham Road in Scarborough—Rouge River in 2008 in the wake of the Liberals' victory in the riding

Scarborough—Rouge River was a federal electoral district in Ontario, Canada, that has been represented in the House of Commons of Canada between 1988 and 2015. However, as of the Fall 2015 federal election, part of this riding has been combined with the south-western part of the old riding Pickering—Scarborough East.

The riding covered the northeast part of the Scarborough part of Toronto. It stretched from Highway 401 in the south to Steeles Avenue in the north. In the east it ended at the border with Pickering and in the west at Midland north of Finch and Brimley south of Finch.

Scarborough—Rouge River has the highest percentage of visible minorities in all electoral districts (89.7%) and the lowest percentage of White Caucasians (10.1%). Chinese make up 30.8%, South Asian 32.8% (all South Asian countries), Black 10.7%, White 8.7% Tamil is the mother tongue for 13.2% of the population, which is the highest such percentage for that language among all ridings; likewise for Tamil as a home language (10.5%). 13.6% of the population is Hindu, the 2nd highest in Canada after Brampton East.

In the 2011 federal election, the NDP were elected for the first time. The riding was abolished before the 2015 election. The western portion, along with most of its population, became part of Scarborough North, while the eastern portion became Scarborough—Rouge Park.

== Geography ==
Scarborough—Rouge River consists of the part of the City of Toronto bounded on the north and east by the city limits, on the west by Midland Avenue, and on the south by a line drawn from the east city limit west along Finch Avenue East, south along Meadowvale Road, west along Sheppard Avenue East, south along Morningside Avenue, west along Highway 401, north along Brimley Road, and west along Finch Avenue East to Midland Avenue.

== History ==
The riding was created in 1987 from part of York—Scarborough riding.

It initially consisted of the part of the City of Scarborough. It was bounded on the north and east by the city limits, and on the south and west by a line drawn southwest from the eastern city limit along Highway 401 and Kingston Road, west along Highland Creek, north along Morningside Avenue, west along Ellesmere Road and north along the Canadian National Railway line to the northern city limit.

In 1996, it was redefined to be bounded on the north and east by the city limits, on the west by the Canadian National Railway situated immediately west of Midland Avenue, and on the south by a line drawn from west to east along Highway 401, north along Conlins Road, and east along Sheppard Avenue East and Twyn Rivers Drive to the east city limits.

In 2003, it was given its current boundaries as described above.

Following the 2012 federal electoral boundaries redistribution, the riding was split between Scarborough North and Scarborough—Rouge Park.

== Members of Parliament ==
This riding has elected the following members of Parliament:

Parliament	Years	Member	Party
Scarborough—Rouge River; Riding created from York—Scarborough
34th	1988–1993	Derek Lee	Liberal
35th	1993–1997	Derek Lee	Liberal
36th	1997–2000	Derek Lee	Liberal
37th	2000–2004	Derek Lee	Liberal
38th	2004–2006	Derek Lee	Liberal
39th	2006–2008	Derek Lee	Liberal
40th	2008–2011	Derek Lee	Liberal
41st	2011–2015	Rathika Sitsabaiesan	New Democratic
Riding dissolved into Scarborough—Rouge Park and Scarborough North

== Election results ==
2011 Canadian federal election
Party	Candidate	Votes	%	±%	Expenditures
New Democratic	Rathika Sitsabaiesan	18,935	40.6	+26.0	$55,192.59
Conservative	Marlene Gallyot	13,935	29.9	+7.4	
Liberal	Rana Sarkar	12,699	27.2	-31.0	
Green	George Singh	684	1.5	-2.4	
Independent	Mark Balack	357	0.8	–	
Total valid votes/Expense limit		46,610	100.0		
Total rejected ballots		221	0.5	–	
Turnout		46,831	56.2	–	
Eligible voters		83,285	–	–	

2008 Canadian federal election
Party	Candidate	Votes	%	±%	Expenditures
Liberal	Derek Lee	23,716	58.2	-7.8	$62,814
Conservative	Jerry Bance	9,160	22.5	+2.0	$76,083
New Democratic	Ryan Sloan	5,954	14.6	+3.8	$1,836
Green	Attila Nagy	1,567	3.9	+2.3	$388
Libertarian	Alan Mercer	331	0.8	–	$2,661
Total valid votes/Expense limit		40,728	100.0	$88,438	

2006 Canadian federal election
Party	Candidate	Votes	%	±%
Liberal	Derek Lee	30,281	66.0	+8.1
Conservative	Jerry Bance	9,426	20.5	+7.2
New Democratic	Andrew Brett	4,973	10.8	+1.5
Green	Serge Abbat	756	1.6	+0.1
Independent	Yaqoob Khan	467	1.0	
Total valid votes		45,903	100.0	

2004 Canadian federal election
Party	Candidate	Votes	%	±%
Liberal	Derek Lee	22,564	57.9	-21.2
Independent	Raymond Cho	6,962	17.9	
Conservative	Tony Backhurst	5,184	13.3	-2.7
New Democratic	Fauzia Khan	3,635	9.3	+4.4
Green	Kathryn Holloway	610	1.5	
Total valid votes		38,955	100.0	

Note: Conservative vote is compared to the total of the Canadian Alliance vote and Progressive Conservative vote in 2000 election.

2000 Canadian federal election
Party	Candidate	Votes	%	±%
Liberal	Derek Lee	28,669	79.1	+4.3
Alliance	Kaiser Suleman	3,237	8.9	+0.8
Progressive Conservative	Alan Shumak	2,566	7.1	-4.3
New Democratic	Paulette Senior	1,793	4.9	0.0
Total valid votes		36,265	100.0	

Note: Canadian Alliance vote is compared to the Reform vote in 1997 election.

1997 Canadian federal election
Party	Candidate	Votes	%	±%
Liberal	Derek Lee	28,636	74.8	+8.7
Progressive Conservative	Joe Li	4,364	11.4	-0.2
Reform	Ronald Bounds	3,102	8.1	-8.7
New Democratic	Pedram Moallemian	1,874	4.9	+2.1
Natural Law	Loucas Café	170	0.4	0.0
Canadian Action	Steven Vaughan	139	0.4	
Total valid votes		38,285	100.0	

1993 Canadian federal election
Party	Candidate	Votes	%	±%
Liberal	Derek Lee	31,582	66.1	+19.0
Reform	Lee Saunders	8,048	16.9	
Progressive Conservative	Paul Ng	5,524	11.6	-26.0
New Democratic	Orrin Benn	1,330	2.8	-10.8
Libertarian	David Kenny	364	0.8	-0.3
Independent	Gulam Mohamed	353	0.7	
National	Chai Kalevar	270	0.6	
Natural Law	Loucas Café	224	0.5	
Abolitionist	Eric Brewer	64	0.1	
Total valid votes		47,759	100.0	

1988 Canadian federal election
Party	Candidate	Votes	%
Liberal	Derek Lee	22,767	47.1
Progressive Conservative	Doug Boswell	18,171	37.6
New Democratic	Raymond Cho	6,589	13.6
Libertarian	Simon Harvey	513	1.1
Green	Lois James	286	0.6
Total valid votes		48,326	100.0

== See also ==
- List of Canadian electoral districts
- Historical federal electoral districts of Canada
