= 2023 Toronto mayoral by-election =

Municipal election in Ontario, Canada

- June 26, 2023
- Turnout: 38.5% (▲8.83 pp)
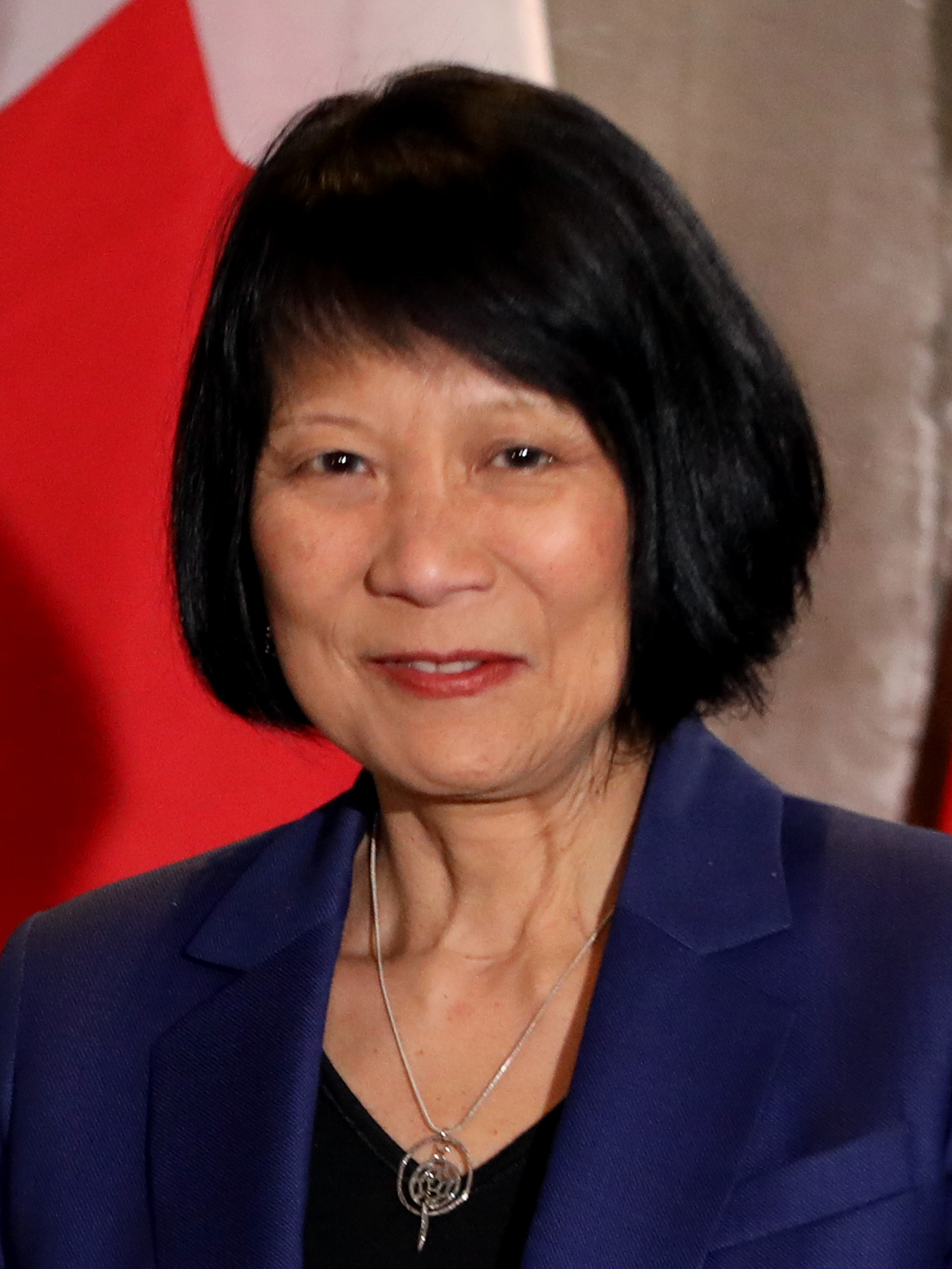

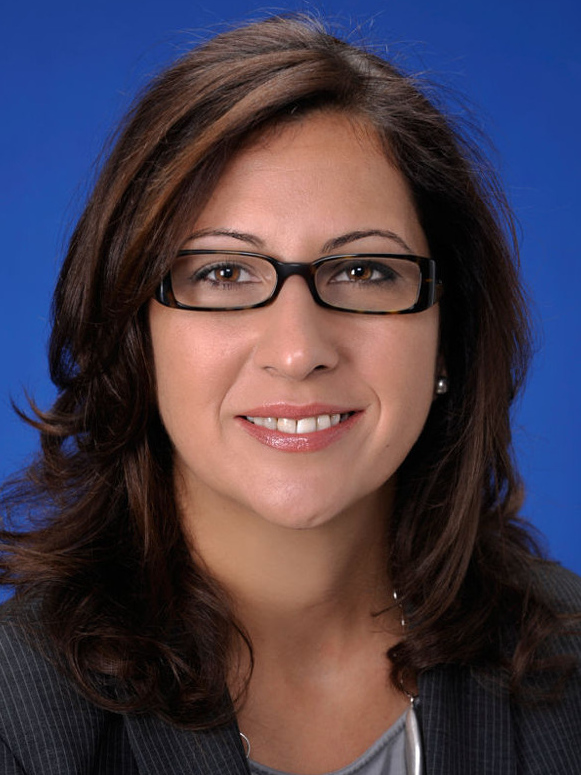

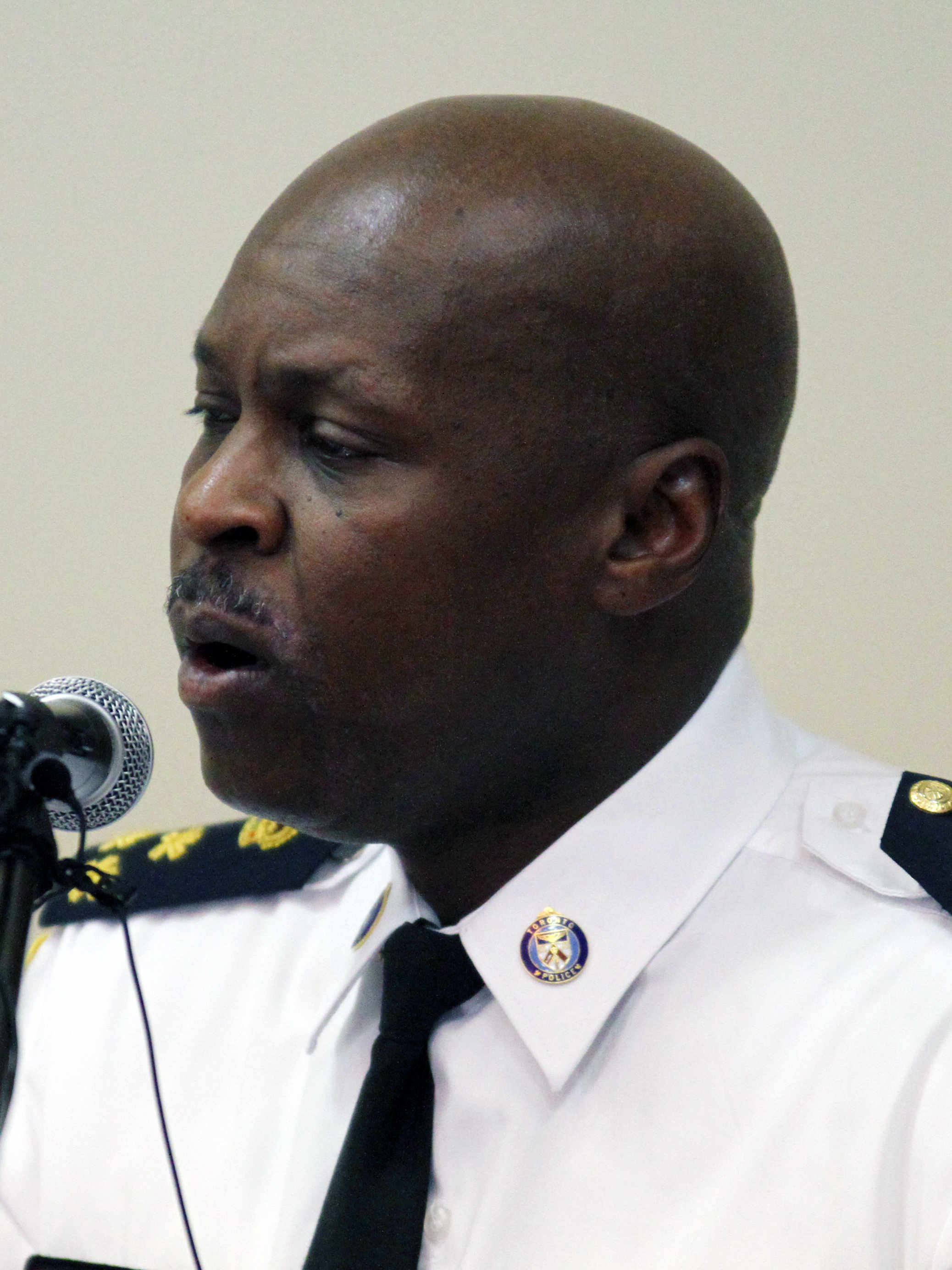
Candidate	Olivia Chow	Ana Bailão	Mark Saunders
Popular vote	269,372	235,175	62,167
Percentage	37.16%	32.46%	8.59%
- Results by ward

- Results by polling subdivision
Mayor before election
John Tory (Note: John Tory resigned February 17, 2023)
Elected mayor
Olivia Chow

A mayoral by-election was held on Monday, June 26, 2023, to elect the 66th mayor of Toronto to serve the remainder of the 2022–2026 city council term following the resignation of Mayor John Tory. The election was won by Olivia Chow, a former city councillor and member of Parliament (MP). She defeated former deputy mayor Ana Bailão, former police chief Mark Saunders, and 99 other candidates. Chow assumed office on July 12, 2023.

On February 10, 2023, Mayor Tory announced his intention to resign following the admission of an affair with a staffer; he left office on February 17, 2023. The deputy mayor, Jennifer McKelvie, assumed certain mayoral powers and was the highest ranking official in the city until a permanent successor was elected. The nomination period for candidates opened on April 3, 2023, closing on May 12, with 102 registered candidates.

== Background ==
=== Resignation of John Tory and subsequent vacancy ===
Tory was first elected in the 2014 mayoral election, and was re-elected in 2018 and 2022. On February 10, 2023, the Toronto Star sent a series of questions to the mayor regarding a relationship he had with a female staffer in his office during the COVID-19 pandemic. Tory confirmed the allegations, admitting to making a "serious error in judgement". Later in the day, Tory announced his intention to resign as mayor of Toronto.

Allies of Tory including city councillors Jon Burnside, Frances Nunziata and Gary Crawford had urged him to stay as mayor, and not resign the post. Premier Doug Ford and the Toronto Police Association also encouraged him not to resign.

Following the passage of the budget on February 15, Tory submitted a letter of resignation to the city clerk, to be effective February 17, 2023, at 5 p.m. During the vacancy, Deputy Mayor Jennifer McKelvie performed the duties of the mayor's office until a permanent successor was elected.

Polling during the election campaign suggested that Tory would win the election if he was a candidate. Despite stating that he would not endorse a candidate, Tory subsequently endorsed former deputy mayor Ana Bailão.

=== By-election process ===
Under the City of Toronto Act, Toronto City Council must declare the office of mayor vacant following Tory's resignation. Within 60 days, a by-law must be passed to set up a by-election. A nomination period for candidates occurs, lasting a minimum of 30 and maximum of 60 days after the formal declaration of a by-election and ends 45 days before the election. The by-election is projected to cost the city approximately $13 million to run. Municipal elections in Toronto are non-partisan, and are held under first-past-the-post voting.

The City Clerk's Office announced that it would recommend the nomination period open on April 3, 2023, and close on May 12, with the by-election to be held on June 26. The office of mayor was formally declared vacant during the March 29 city council meeting and a by-law was passed to confirm the by-election.

The number of candidates led to suggestion that the barrier to entry be increased.

== Mayoral debates ==
Over 10 mayoral debates took place during the campaign. A planned debate at OCAD University (in collaboration with 60 Toronto residents' associations) scheduled to take place on June 1, 2023, was cancelled after threats were made to candidates prior to the event. A planned debate on climate action at the University of Toronto School of the Environment scheduled to take place on June 5, 2023, was cancelled due to scheduling conflicts.

List of mayoral debates
Date	Hosted by	Participants	Moderator	Notes	Ref
May 10	West Queen West Business Improvement Association	Bradford, Furey, Hunter, Perruzza, Saunders	Stefanos Lialias		
May 15	Daily Bread Food Bank	Bailão, Bradford, Chow, Hunter, Matlow	Maggie John	Saunders was invited, but declined	
May 24	Toronto Alliance for the Performing Arts	Bailão, Bradford, Chow, Hunter, Matlow	Maxine Bailey	Saunders was invited, but declined	
May 24	Residential Construction Council of Ontario	Bailão, Bradford, Chow, Hunter, Matlow, Saunders	Joe Cressy		
May 24	The Scarborough Community Renewal Organization, the Scarborough Business Association, and Scarborough United Neighbourhoods.	Bailão, Bradford, Chow, Hunter, Matlow, Saunders	Cynthia Mulligan	Broadcast on Citytv and CityNews 24/7	
May 25	Toronto Board of Trade and TVO	Bailão, Bradford, Chow, Hunter, Matlow, Saunders	Steve Paikin		
May 31	Toronto Metropolitan University, in collaboration with United Way and Toronto Star	Bailão, Bradford, Chow, Hunter, Matlow, Saunders	Edward Keenan		
June 6	CBC Toronto	Bailão, Chow, Hunter, Matlow, Saunders	Marivel Taruc and Shawn Jeffords	Bradford declined, due to birth of his child on June 5	
June 6	Operation Black Vote Canada	Brown, Chavannes, Chow, Davis, Hunter, Saunders, K. Singh			
June 7	Canadian Association of Retired Persons (CARP)	Bailão, Bradford, Brown, Chow, Furey, Hunter, Matlow, Saunders	Libby Znaimer	Broadcast on ZoomerMedia	
June 8	Five Etobicoke residents' associations	Bradford, Davis, Hunter, Mammoliti, Matlow, Saunders	John Campbell	Chow and Bailão were invited, but declined	
June 12	University of Toronto's School of Cities, the Urban Land Institute Toronto, and Canadian Urban Institute	Bailão, Bradford, Chow, Hunter, Matlow, Saunders	Marivel Taruc		
June 15	CP24 and Newstalk 1010	Bailão, Bradford, Chow, Furey, Hunter, Matlow, Saunders	John Moore and Leena Latafat		
June 19	Now Toronto	Bradford, Brown, Furey, Hunter, Matlow	Brandon Gonez	Chow and Bailão did not reply to their invites, Saunders declined	

== Candidates ==
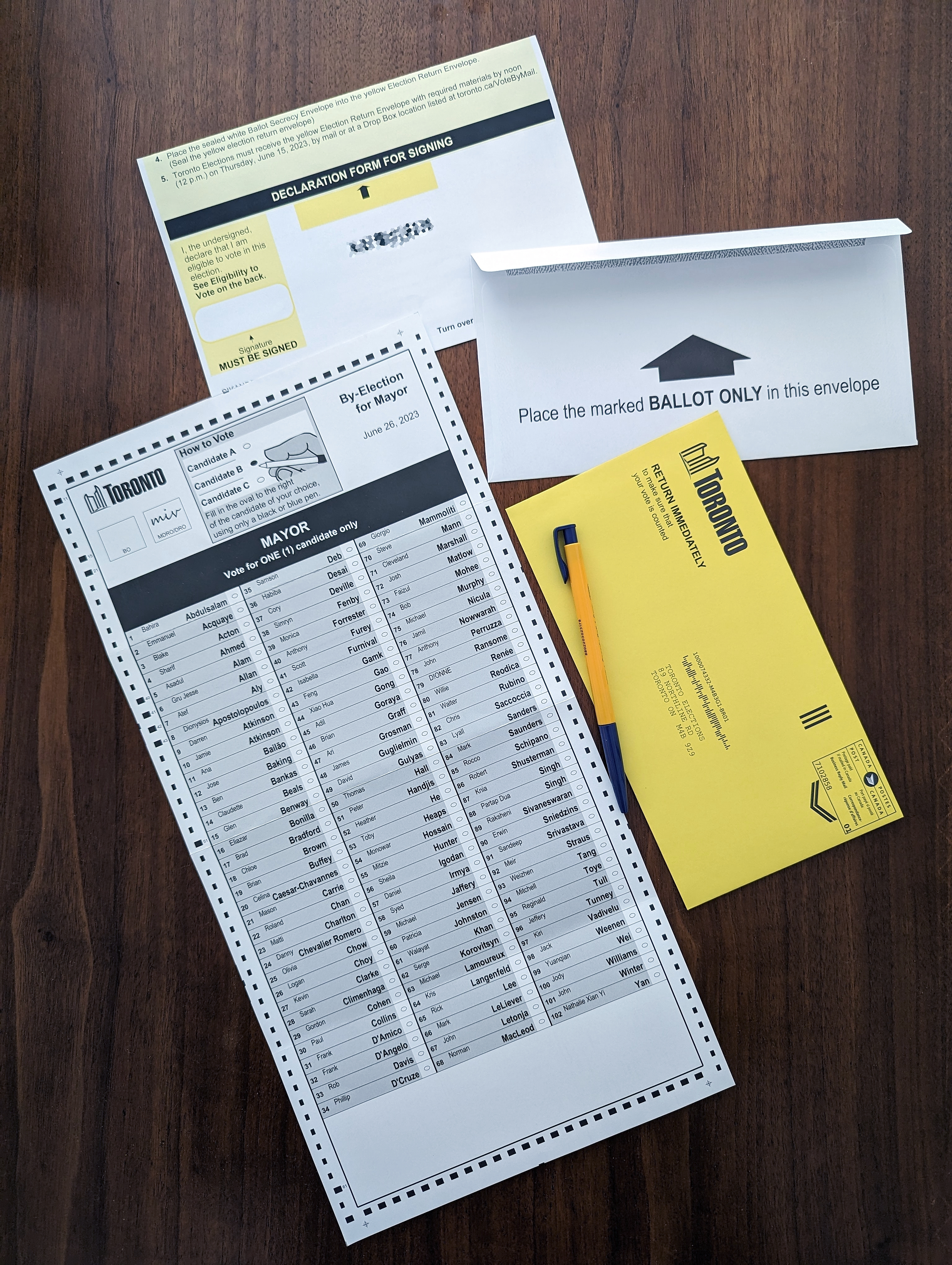
Mail-in voting package for the by-election

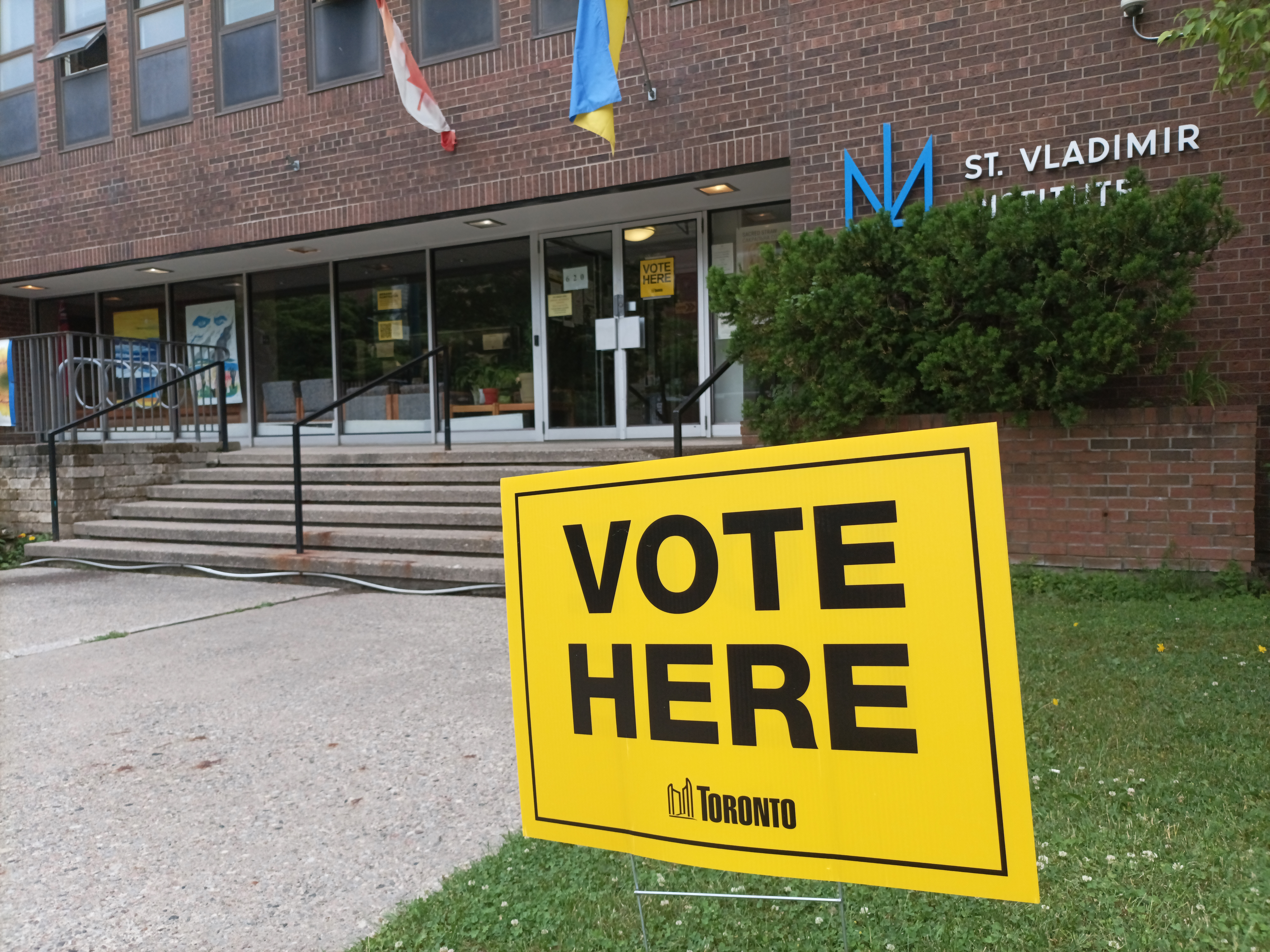
A polling station in downtown Toronto

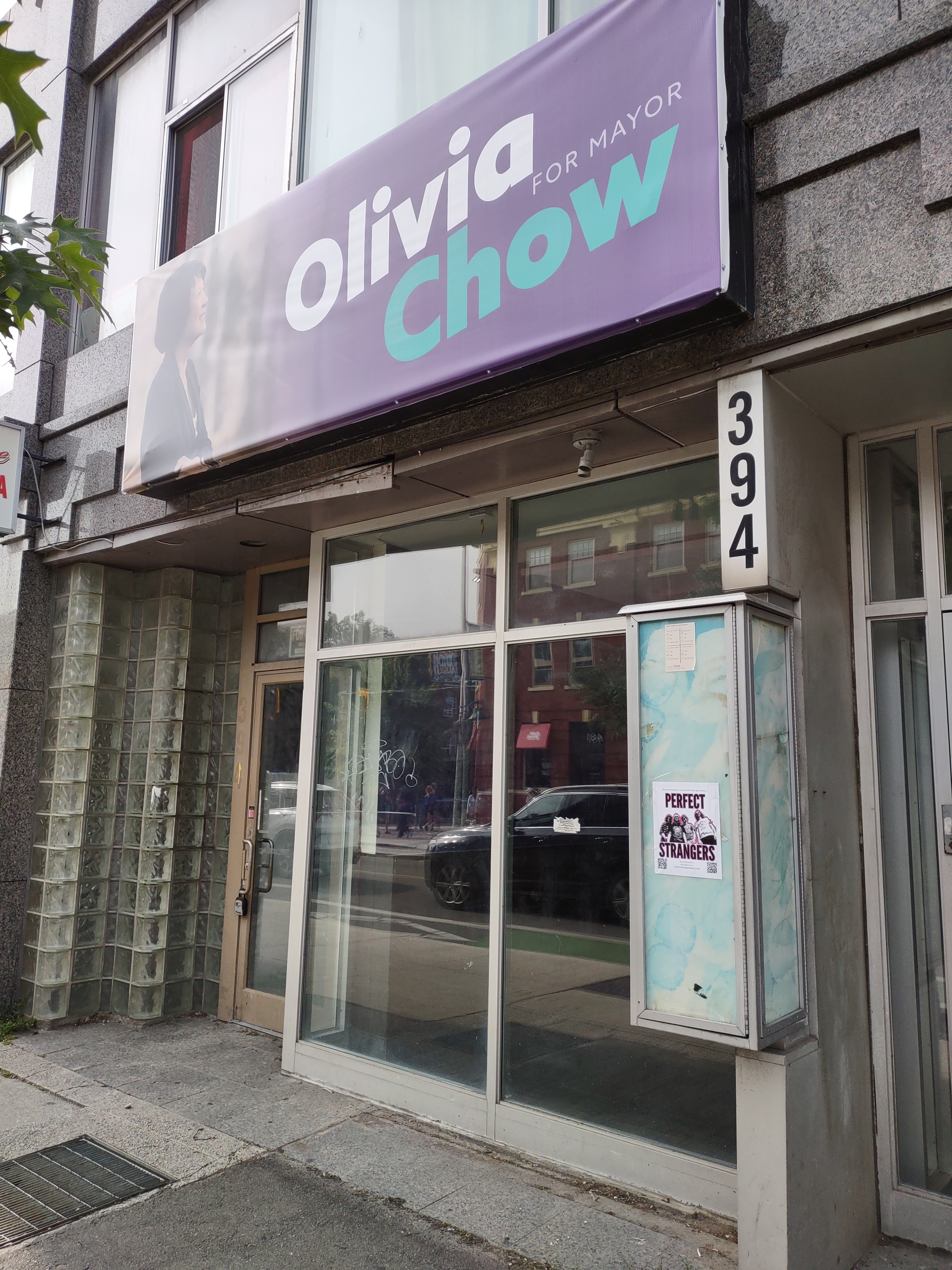
The campaign office of the by-election winner Olivia Chow

Registration for candidates for the office of mayor officially opened on April 3, 2023. The deadline for candidate nominations closed Friday, May 12 at 2 p.m. 105 candidates were nominated, with three candidates withdrawing their candidacy prior to the election. 102 candidates therefore ran for the office of mayor.

List of registered candidates
Name	Nomination date	Notes	Major policies
Bahira Abdulsalam	April 3, 2023	Certified professional engineer.	
Emmanuel Acquaye	May 1, 2023		
Blake Acton	April 3, 2023	Retired police officer and fourth-place finisher in the 2022 mayoral election.	
Sharif Ahmed	May 8, 2023	Ran for councillor of Ward 22 in the 2021 by-election, placing 17th	
Gru Jesse Allen	May 1, 2023	Housing activist	
Atef Aly	May 2, 2023		
Dionysios Apostolopoulos	May 10, 2023		
Alam Asadul	May 12, 2023		
Darren Atkinson	April 28, 2023	Independent entrepreneur, inventor, and musician	
Jamie Atkinson	May 12, 2023		Proposed a high-speed rail to Quebec from Toronto. Proposed elevated bike lanes known as the B-line. Proposed skies the limit, rapid housing development.
Ana Bailão	April 3, 2023	Former deputy mayor of Toronto (2017–2022) and former city councillor for Davenport (2010–2022).	Reverse transit cuts, and expand trauma crisis services. Request permission to decriminalize recreational drugs.
Jose Baking	April 14, 2023		
Ben Bankas	May 5, 2023	Comedian, running a joke campaign	Allowing smoking on patios and in bars after midnight, allow bars and restaurants to operate until 4 a.m., make Toronto more dog friendly, turn City Hall into a refugee and homeless camp
Claudette Beals	April 6, 2023	Mother to Regis Korchinski-Paquet, whose high profile death was investigated by the Special Investigations Unit.	
Glen Benway	April 19, 2023	Farmer and accountant	
Eliazar Bonilla	May 12, 2023		
Brad Bradford	April 3, 2023	City councillor for Beaches—East York (2018–2026).	Install subway platform doors. Request permission to decriminalize recreational drugs.
Chloe Brown	April 11, 2023	Third-place finisher in the 2022 mayoral election.	Implement a land value tax and rent control. Request permission to decriminalize recreational drugs. Housing first strategy to end homelessness. Convert Ontario Place and Science Centre into scientific research and education hubs with a focus on the climate crisis. Build "Campuses of Care" with affordable and accessible housing, healthcare, and social services in centralized within communities. Expand Library Card program to include access to therapy and social care services, cultural events, professional development tools, and healthcare referrals all on one card.
Brian Buffey	May 5, 2023	Ran in 2018 mayoral election.	
Celina Caesar-Chavannes	April 4, 2023	Former Liberal member of Parliament (MP) for Whitby (2015–2019).	
Carrie Mason	May 11, 2023		
Roland Chan	April 11, 2023		
Matti Charlton	April 26, 2023	Author, songwriter, musician, board member of Church & Wellesley Neighbourhood Association	Address homelessness, reform drug policy, create a community centred organization for maintaining peace and security outside of the Police, provide more opportunities for public performance for independent musicians, fix the city's budget deficit.
Danny Chevalier Romero	May 12, 2023		
Olivia Chow	April 17, 2023	Third-place finisher in the 2014 Toronto mayoral election. Former New Democratic MP for Trinity—Spadina from 2006 to 2014, former Councillor for Ward 20 from 1998 to 2005, and former Metro Toronto Council member for Ward 24 from 1992 to 1998.	Stop renovictions by transferring affordable rental apartment buildings to not-for-profit providers. Double the reach of Toronto's Rent Bank and increase the Tenant Support Program. Request permission to decriminalize recreational drugs. Build a Scarborough busway along the route of the decommissioned SRT.
Logan Choy	May 8, 2023	Ran in the 2018 mayoral election, placing 9th.	
Kevin Clarke	April 25, 2023	Perennial candidate, ran in the last 7 mayoral elections. Ninth-place finisher in the 2022 mayoral election.	
Sarah Climenhaga	April 3, 2023	Environmental and safe streets activist. Came in sixth in the 2018, and fifth in the 2022 Toronto mayoral elections. 2019 Green Party of Canada candidate for Toronto—St. Paul's.	
Gordon Cohen	April 3, 2023		
Paul Collins	May 12, 2023		
Frank D'Amico	April 28, 2023	Toronto Catholic District School Board (TCDSB) Trustee for Ward 6	
Frank D'Angelo	April 3, 2023	Entrepreneur in the food, restaurant and entertainment industries.	
Philip D'Cruze	April 3, 2023	Retired member of the Canadian Armed Forces.	
Rob Davis	April 3, 2023	Former TTC vice-chair and city councillor for Ward 28 – York Eglinton (1997-2000). 1996 Progressive Conservative by-election candidate in York South Campaign suspended on June 20.	Stop the construction of additional bike lanes.
Samson Deb	May 1, 2023		
Habiba Desai	May 8, 2023	Ran for councillor of Ward 24 in the 2022 municipal election, placing third.	
Cory Deville	April 3, 2023		
Simryn Fenby	May 9, 2023	Actor	
Monica Forrester	May 11, 2023	Support worker in the transgender community	
Anthony Furey	April 3, 2023	Former Toronto Sun columnist and broadcaster.	End funding for supervised injection sites, in favor of involuntary treatment. Eliminate cycling infrastructure on major roads. Remove land transfer tax.
Scott Furnival	May 12, 2023		
Isabella Gamk	April 3, 2023	Housing advocate, and founder of nonprofit calling for increased funding for disability benefits.	
Feng Gao	May 2, 2023		
Xiao Hua Gong	April 11, 2023	Businessman, former theatre director, and former pyramid scheme operator.	Hiring 1,000 new police officers, cutting property taxes by $1,000 and making public transit free to ride for riders aged over 55 or under 18.
Adil Goraya	April 26, 2023		
Brian Graff	April 13, 2023	Placed 3rd in Ward 32 in the 2014 Toronto municipal election. Attempted leadership bid for federal NDP in 2017.	
Ari Grosman	April 28, 2023		
James Guglielmin	May 11, 2023		
David Gulyas	May 1, 2023		
Thomas Hall	April 20, 2023		
Peter Handjis	April 6, 2023	Placed 31st of 31 candidates in the 2022 mayoral election.	
Heather He	April 11, 2023		
Toby Heaps	May 12, 2023	Co-founder and CEO of Corporate Knights. Campaign manager for Ralph Nader's 2008 presidential campaign. Purported his dog Molly to be an unofficial co-candidate; a claim he later recanted.	Empathic and non-business as usual ideas for dogs, affordable housing and the environment.
Monowar Hossain	April 17, 2023	Perennial candidate. Ran for mayor last six elections, 2003 to 2022.	
Mitzie Hunter	April 3, 2023	Liberal MPP for Scarborough—Guildwood (2013–2023), Minister of Advanced Education and Skills Development (2018), Minister of Education (2016–2018).	Create a climate change Chief Resiliency Office. Do not use strong-mayor powers. Request permission to decriminalize recreational drugs.
Sheila Igodan	May 1, 2023		
Daniel Irmya	May 11, 2023		
Syed Jaffery	April 3, 2023	Ran as People's Party of Canada candidate in Toronto Centre in the 2021 federal election.	
Michael Jensen	May 3, 2023		
Patricia Johnston	April 25, 2023		
Serge Korovitsyn	April 25, 2023	Chairperson of the Ontario Libertarian Party	
Michael Lamoureaux	April 4, 2023		
Kris Langenfeld	April 3, 2023	Former accountant, computer consultant, and software developer. Placed 28th in the 2018 and 23rd in the 2022 Toronto mayoral elections.	
Rick Lee	May 12, 2023		
Mark LeLiever	May 4, 2023		
John Letonja	April 12, 2023	Twenty ninth-place finisher in the 2022 mayoral election. Thirtieth-place finisher in the 2010 mayoral election.	
Walayat Khan	May 12, 2023		
Norman MacLeod	May 11, 2023		
Giorgio Mammoliti	April 3, 2023	Former city councillor for York West (2000–2018), former New Democratic MPP for Yorkview (1990–1995). Campaign suspended on June 24.	
Steve Mann	May 12, 2023		
Cleveland Marshall	May 12, 2023		
Josh Matlow	April 3, 2023	City councillor for Toronto—St. Paul's (2010–present).	Increase property taxes by 2% and create a public agency to develop government housing. Implement a commercial parking lot tax. Request permission to decriminalize recreational drugs.
Faizul Mohee	May 9, 2023	Engineer and Professor.	
Bob Murphy	May 12, 2023		
Michael Nicula	May 1, 2023	Founder and former party leader of the now deregistered Party for Accountability, Competency and Transparency. Ran for mayor in 2014 and 2018, and three times for MP in various ridings (2012, 2013, 2015).	
Jamil Nowwarah	May 11, 2023		
Anthony Perruzza	April 12, 2023	City councillor for Ward 8 York West (2006–2018), City councillor for Ward 7 Humber River—Black Creek (2018–present), NDP MPP for Downsview (1990–1995).	Freeze property taxes, TTC fares and user fees.
John Ransome	April 28, 2023		
D!ONNE Renée	May 4, 2023	Ran in the 2014, 2018, and 2022 mayoral elections.	
Willie Reodica	May 4, 2023	Father to Jeffery Reodica, who was fatally shot by a Toronto Police officer in 2004.	
Walter Rubino	April 3, 2023		
Chris Saccoccia	April 3, 2023	A.k.a. Chris Sky. Former property developer, conspiracy theorist, anti-lockdown and anti-vaccine activist, and anti-semite.	Prohibit the creation of 15-minute cities and digital IDs.
Lyall Sanders	April 6, 2023		
Mark Saunders	April 3, 2023	Former chief of the Toronto Police Service (2015–2020), PC candidate for Don Valley West during the 2022 Ontario election.	Increase the number of TTC special constables and give them body cameras. Partially replace funding for supervised injection sites with funding for addiction treatment centres.
Rocco Schipano	May 9, 2023		
Robert Shusterman	May 11, 2023	Real estate agent	
Knia Singh	April 3, 2023	Lawyer and human rights activist, twelfth-place finisher in the 2022 mayoral election.	
Partap Dua Singh	May 12, 2023		
Raksheni Sivaneswaran	May 11, 2023		
Erwin Sniedzins	April 4, 2023	Ran as independent candidate for Eglinton—Lawrence in 2014, and as New Blue in 2022.	
Sandeep Srivastava	April 3, 2023		
Meir Straus	April 3, 2023	High school student and youngest registered candidate.	Replace public benches with beanbag chairs.
Weizhen Tang	April 11, 2023	Former convicted fraudster.	
Mitchell Toye	May 12, 2023		
Reginald Tull	April 3, 2023	10th place finisher in the 2022 mayor election.	
Jeffery Tunney	April 3, 2023		
Kiri Vadivelu	April 3, 2023	Municipal Socialist Alliance candidate and tenant activist, ran in Ward 21 Scarborough Centre in 2022, placing fourth.	
Jack Weenen	April 3, 2023	Perennial candidate (finished 65th in the 2014 mayoral election and 31st in the 2018 mayoral elections)	
Yuanqian Wei	April 13, 2023		
Jody Williams	April 6, 2023		
John Winter	May 12, 2023		
Nathalie Xian Yi Yan	April 6, 2023	Acupuncturist who was disciplined in 2018 by the College of Traditional Chinese Medicine Practitioners and Acupuncturists of Ontario for professional misconduct. Perennial Candidate. Ran as independent for MP of Hamilton Centre in 2019 and 2021, and for MPP of Hamilton Centre in 2023.	

List of withdrawn candidates
Name	Nomination date	Withdrawn date
James Chung	April 25, 2023	May 1, 2023
Rupica Singh Waraich	April 3, 2023	April 24, 2023
Joshua Singh	May 1, 2023	May 12, 2023

=== Declined ===
- Stan Cho, provincial associate minister of transportation (2021–2023) and Progressive Conservative MPP for Willowdale (2018–present).
- Michael Clemons, general manager of the Toronto Argonauts and Canadian Football Hall of Famer.
- Josh Colle, former city councillor for Eglinton—Lawrence (2010–2018) and former chair of the Toronto Transit Commission (2014–2018).
- Joe Cressy, senior vice president at George Brown College, former city councillor for Spadina—Fort York (2014–2022).
- Nathaniel Erskine-Smith, Liberal MP for Beaches—East York (2015–2026).
- Doug Ford, 26th premier of Ontario and Progressive Conservative MPP for Etobicoke North (2018–present), runner-up in the 2014 mayoral election, former city councillor for Etobicoke North (2010–2014).
- Stephen Holyday, city councillor for Etobicoke Centre (2014–present).
- Ahmed Hussen, federal minister of housing and diversity and inclusion (2021–2023) and Liberal MP for York South—Weston (2015–present).
- Bhutila Karpoche, New Democratic MPP for Parkdale—High Park (2018–2025).
- Jennifer Keesmaat, former chief city planner (2012–2017) and runner-up in the 2018 mayoral election.
- Mike Layton, former city councillor for Ward 11 University—Rosedale (2018–2022) and Ward 19 Trinity—Spadina (2010–2018).
- Marco Mendicino, federal minister of public safety (2021–2023) and Liberal MP for Eglinton—Lawrence (2015–2025).
- Jennifer McKelvie, deputy mayor of Toronto (2022–2025) and city councillor for Scarborough—Rouge Park (2018–2025).
- Denzil Minnan-Wong, former deputy mayor of Toronto (2014–2022) and former city councillor for Don Valley East (1998–2022).
- Gil Peñalosa, runner-up in the 2022 mayoral election and urbanist.
- Rod Phillips, former provincial minister of long-term care (2021–2022), minister of finance (2019–2020), minister of the environment, conservation and parks (2018–2019), Progressive Conservative MPP for Ajax (2018–2022).
- Kristyn Wong-Tam, New Democratic MPP for Toronto Centre (2022–present) and former city councillor for Toronto Centre-Rosedale (2010–2022).
- Kathleen Wynne, 25th premier of Ontario (2013–2018), former Liberal MPP for Don Valley West (2003–2022).

== Endorsements ==
	Current politicians	Former politicians	Unions	Other
Ana Bailão	City councillors: Paul Ainslie; Shelley Carroll; Michael Colle; Vincent Crisanti; Nick Mantas; Jennifer McKelvie, Deputy Mayor of Toronto; Chris Moise; Frances Nunziata; James Pasternak; MPs: Gary Anandasangaree; Julie Dzerowicz; Ali Ehsassi; Peter Fonseca; Ahmed Hussen; James Maloney; Judy Sgro; Charles Sousa; Arif Virani; Jean Yip; Salma Zahid; MPPs: Mary-Margaret McMahon	Former Toronto mayors: Art Eggleton; Barbara Hall; John Tory; Former city councillors: Glenn De Baeremaeker; Chin Lee; Cesar Palacio; Ceta Ramkhalawansingh; Former MPPs: Alvin Curling; Cristina Martins	Public sector: Canadian Union of Public Employees (CUPE) Local 79; CUPE Local 416; Private sector: Carpenters Local 27; Laborers' International Union of North America (LiUNA!) Local 183; LiUNA! Local 506; UNITE HERE Local 75	Media: Toronto Star
Brad Bradford	Ontario mayors: Cam Guthrie, Mayor of Guelph; MPs: Scott Aitchison	Former city councillors: Case Ootes		
Olivia Chow	City councillors: Alejandra Bravo; Lily Cheng; Paula Fletcher; Ausma Malik; Amber Morley; Jamaal Myers; Gord Perks; MPs: Charlie Angus; Peter Julian; MPPs: Doly Begum; Jessica Bell; Chris Glover; Joel Harden; Marit Stiles, Leader of the Official Opposition; Kristyn Wong-Tam; School board trustees: Maria Rizzo; Neethan Shan	Former city councillors: Mike Layton; Former MPs: Libby Davies; Former MPPs: Cheri DiNovo; Faisal Hassan; Suze Morrison; Gurratan Singh	Public sector: Amalgamated Transit Union (ATU) Canada; ATU Local 113; CUPE Local 4948; CUPE 3902; CUPE Ontario; Elementary Teachers of Toronto; Ontario Public Service Employees Union; Toronto Secondary Unit-Ontario English Catholic Teachers' Association; Private sector: Canadian Office and Professional Employees (COPE) Local 343; United Food and Commercial Workers Canada; United Steelworkers Toronto Area Council	People: Christine Boyle, Vancouver city councillor; Sook-Yin Lee, broadcaster and film director; Mae Martin, comedian; Steve Munro, transit advocate; Gil Penalosa, 2022 election runner-up; Sarah Polley, filmmaker; Duke Redbird, poet; Brent Toderian, former Vancouver chief planner; Jean Yoon, actress; Organizations: Progress Toronto
Anthony Furey		Former city councillors: Rob Davis; Giorgio Mammoliti; Former MPs: John Baird; Pauline Browes; Sarmite Bulte; Joe Oliver; Dan McTeague; Dennis Mills; Former MPPs: Roman Baber; John Hastings; Gila Martow; Bob Runciman; Peter Shurman; John Snobelen; Gordon Walker; Former senators: Vern White		People: Jerry Agar, radio host; Conrad Black, former member of the British House of Lords, former newspaper publisher; Stephen LeDrew, lawyer and broadcaster; Sue-Ann Levy, conservative political commentator; Mark McEwan, celebrity chef; Jordan Peterson, media commentator and former psychology professor; Mike Weaver, former professional hockey player
Mitzie Hunter		Former MPPs: Brad Duguid		People: Dave Meslin, community organizer and activist; Chase Tang, actor
Josh Matlow	MPs: Carolyn Bennett; Michael Coteau; Rob Oliphant	Former Toronto mayors: John Sewell; Former city councillors: David Soknacki; Former MPPs: Greg Sorbara; Former MPs: Gerard Kennedy		People: Jay Douglas, musician; Erica Ehm, former Much Music VJ; Sharon Hampson and Bram Morrison, entertainers; Nick Kypreos, former professional hockey player; Organizations: Armenian National Committee of Toronto
Mark Saunders	City councillors: Stephen Holyday; MPPs: Doug Ford, Premier of Ontario		Public sector: CUPE Local 5089	Media: Toronto Sun

== Opinion polls ==
Graphical Summary

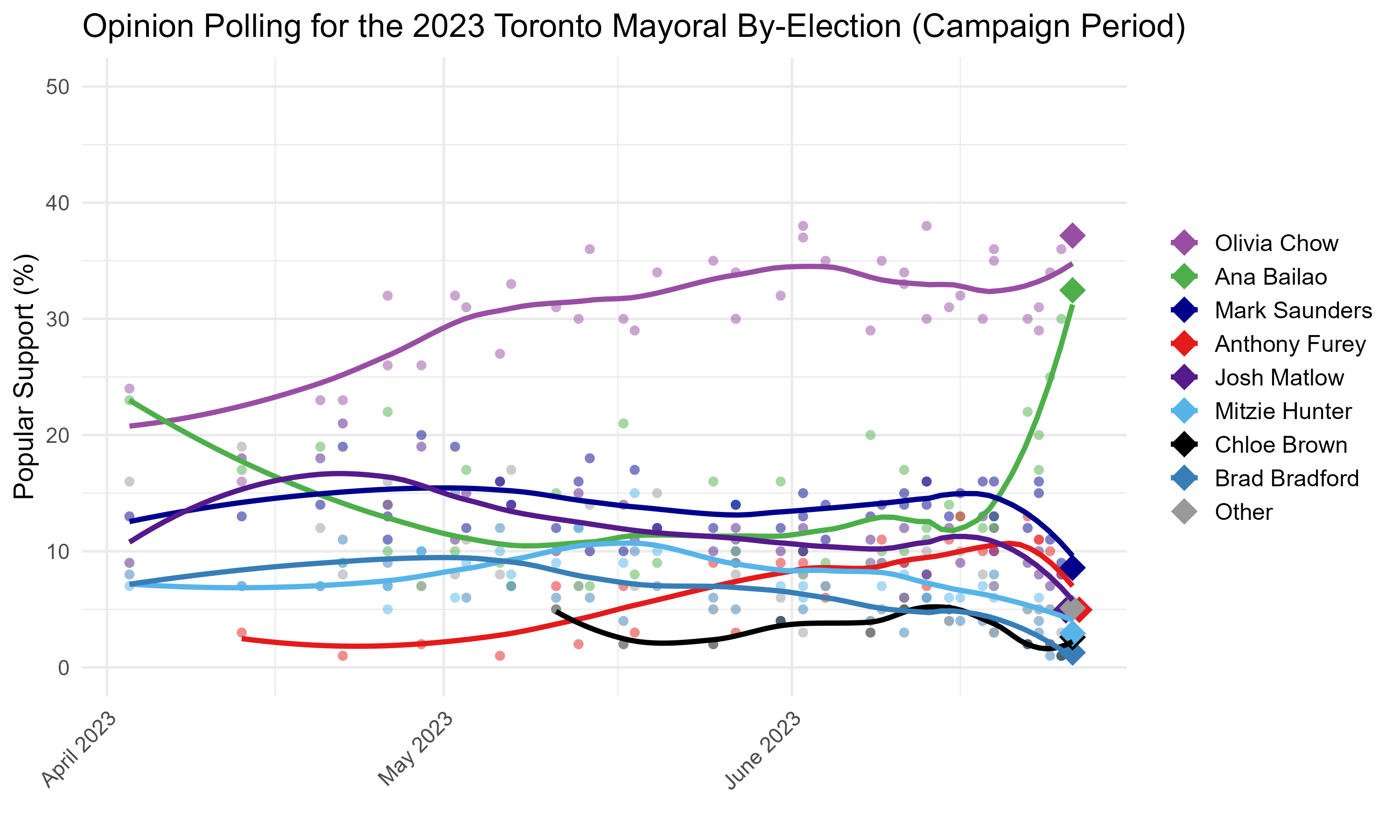
Opinion Polling for the 2023 Toronto Mayoral By-Election

Campaign period

Polling firm	Source	Date of poll	Sample size	MOE	Ana Bailão	Brad Bradford	Chloe Brown	Olivia Chow	Anthony Furey	Mitzie Hunter	Josh Matlow	Mark Saunders	Other
Mainstreet Research	IVR	June 25, 2023	1030	± 3.1%	30%	1%	1%	36%	8%	5%	8%	9%	3%
Mainstreet Research	IVR	June 24, 2023	940	± 3.2%	25%	1%	2%	34%	10%	5%	7%	11%	5%
Forum Research	IVR	June 23, 2023	1,037	± 3%	20%	3%	–	29%	11%	5%	8%	15%	
Liaison Strategies	IVR	Jun 22–23, 2023	1,086	± 2.97%	17%	4%	–	31%	11%	6%	10%	16%	5%
Mainstreet Research	IVR	Jun 21–22, 2023	1,481	± 2.5%	22%	2%	2%	30%	13%	5%	9%	12%	5%
Mainstreet Research	IVR	Jun 17–19, 2023	552	± 4.2%	13%	3%	4%	36%	7%	7%	12%	13%	4%
Viewpoints Research	Online	Jun 15–19, 2023	1,007	± 3%	12%	8%	–	35%	10%	6%	10%	16%	3%
Liaison Strategies	IVR	Jun 17–18, 2023	1,152	± 2.89%	12%	4%	–	30%	10%	7%	13%	16%	8%
Forum Research	IVR	June 16, 2023	1,006	± 3%	13%	4%	–	32%	13%	6%	9%	15%	10%
Mainstreet Research	IVR	June 15, 2023	899	± 3.3%	14%	4%	5%	31%	11%	6%	12%	13%	4%
Liaison Strategies	IVR	Jun 12–13, 2023	1,156	± 3.01%	11%	5%	–	30%	8%	8%	16%	16%	6%
Ipsos	Online/Phone	Jun 9–13, 2023	1,001	± 3.5%	12%	6%	–	38%	7%	6%	8%	14%	10%
Liaison Strategies	IVR	Jun 10–11, 2023	1,197	± 2.83%	10%	6%	–	34%	9%	9%	12%	15%	5%
Mainstreet Research	IVR	Jun 9–11, 2023	833	± 3.4%	17%	3%	5%	33%	9%	8%	6%	14%	6%
Forum Research	IVR	June 9, 2023	1,047	± 3%	10%	5%	–	35%	11%	7%	9%	14%	9%
Mainstreet Research	IVR	Jun 7–8, 2023	706	± 3.7%	20%	4%	3%	29%	9%	9%	11%	13%	4%
Liaison Strategies	IVR	Jun 3–4, 2023	1,287	± 2.73%	9%	7%	–	35%	6%	11%	11%	14%	7%
Forum Research	IVR	June 2, 2023	1,032	± 3%	8%	5%	–	38%	10%	7%	12%	13%	8%
Viewpoints Research	Online	Jun 1–2, 2023	780	± 3%	10%	10%	–	37%	9%	6%	10%	15%	3%
Mainstreet Research	IVR	May 30–31, 2023	1,110	± 3%	16%	4%	4%	32%	9%	7%	10%	12%	6%
Forum Research	IVR	May 26–27, 2023	1,007	± 3%	9%	5%	–	34%	9%	9%	12%	14%	8%
Liaison Strategies	IVR	May 26–27, 2023	1,305	± 2.7%	10%	10%	–	30%	3%	14%	11%	14%	10%
Mainstreet Research	IVR	May 24–25, 2023	838	± 3.4%	16%	6%	2%	35%	9%	5%	10%	12%	5%
Forum Research	IVR	May 19–20, 2023	1,000	± 3%	9%	7%	–	34%	–	10%	12%	12%	15%
Liaison Strategies	IVR	May 17–18, 2023	1,311	± 2.7%	8%	10%	–	29%	3%	15%	11%	17%	7%
Mainstreet Research	IVR	May 16–17, 2023	1,125	± 2.9%	21%	4%	2%	30%	7%	9%	14%	10%	2% (Note: Includes 1% for Chris Saccoccia.)
Forum Research	IVR	May 13–14, 2023	1,029	± 3%	7%	6%	–	36%	–	10%	10%	18%	14%
Liaison Strategies	IVR	May 12–13, 2023	1,318	± 2.7%	7%	12%	–	30%	2%	12%	15%	16%	7% (Note: Includes 1% for Anthony Perruzza)
Mainstreet Research	IVR	May 10–11, 2023	1,205	± 2.8%	15%	6%	5%	31%	7%	9%	10%	12%	5%
Forum Research	IVR	May 6–7, 2023	2,000	± 2%	7%	7%	–	33%	–	8%	14%	14%	17%
Liaison Strategies	IVR	May 5–6, 2023	1,257	± 2.76%	9%	12%	–	27%	1%	10%	16%	16%	8%
Mainstreet Research	IVR	May 2–3, 2023	1,056	± 3%	17%	6%	–	31%	–	9%	15%	12%	11%
Viewpoints Research	Online	Apr 29 – May 2, 2023	400	± 4.9%	10%	15%	–	32%	–	6%	11%	19%	8%
Liaison Strategies	IVR	Apr 28–29, 2023	1,253	± 2.76%	7%	10%	–	26%	2%	10%	19%	20%	7%
Forum Research	IVR	Apr 25–26, 2023	1,022	± 3%	10%	7%	–	32%	–	7%	14%	13%	16%
Mainstreet Research	IVR	Apr 25–26, 2023	996	± 3.1%	22%	9%	–	26%	–	5%	14%	11%	14%
Liaison Strategies	IVR	Apr 21–22, 2023	1,264	± 2.75%	9%	11%	–	23%	1%	9%	21%	19%	8%
Mainstreet Research	IVR	Apr 19–20, 2023	1,082	± 3%	19%	7%	–	23%	–	7%	18%	14%	12%
Mainstreet Research	IVR	Apr 12–13, 2023	785	± 3.5%	17%	7%	–	16%	3%	7%	18%	13%	19%
Mainstreet Research	IVR	Apr 2–3, 2023	1,306	± 2.7%	23%	8%	–	24%	–	7%	9%	13%	16%

Prior to campaign period

Polling firm	Source	Date of poll	Sample size	MOE	Ana Bailão	Brad Bradford	Olivia Chow	Mitzie Hunter	Josh Matlow	Mark Saunders	Other (Note: Including undeclared candidates and "undecided")
Forum Research	IVR	Mar 23, 2023	1,009	± 3%	11%	5%	24%	12%	18%	8%	22%
Mainstreet Research	IVR	Mar 19, 2023	985	± 3.1%	22%	6%	–	11%	17%	8%	35%
Mainstreet Research	IVR	Feb 19, 2023	1,701	± 2.4%	17%	9%	–	15%	13%	13%	33%
Mainstreet Research	IVR	Feb 14, 2023	1,947	± 2.2%	9%	7%	–	–	10%	–	74%
Forum Research	IVR	Feb 14, 2023	1,042	± 3%	11%	11%	–	–	–	–	78%

== Results ==
=== Total ===
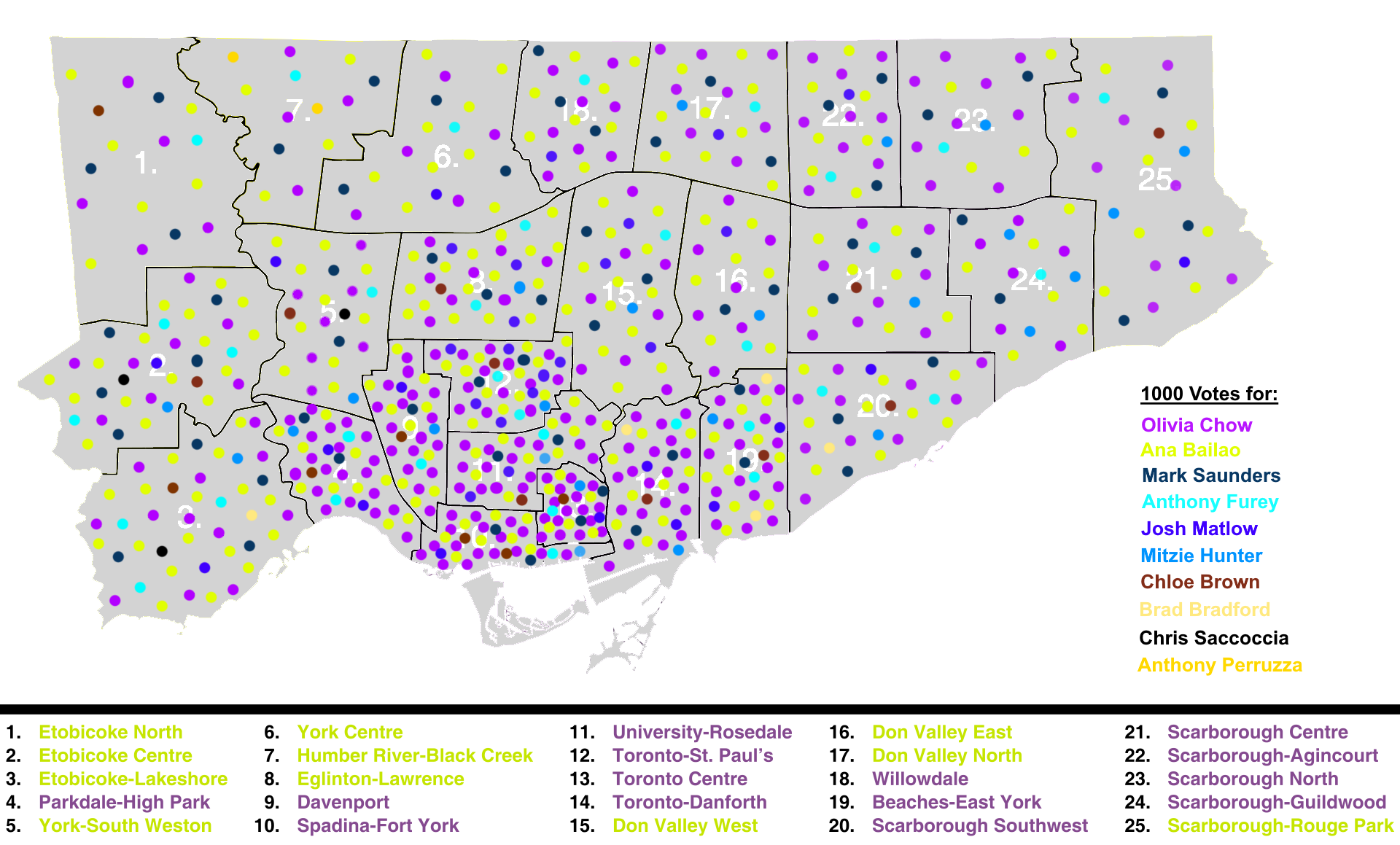
Each dot represents 1,000 votes for a candidate in that ward. Dots are placed randomly within the ward.

Results map by polling subdivision, with opacity adjusted by vote density

Turnout map by polling subdivision

The election took place on Monday, 26 June 2023, with official results certified by the City Clerk two days later. The turnout was 38.5%, around 9% higher than the 2022 election.

Mayoral Candidate	Vote	%
Olivia Chow	269,372	37.17%
Ana Bailão	235,175	32.46%
Mark Saunders	62,167	8.58%
Anthony Furey	35,899	4.96%
Josh Matlow	35,572	4.91%
Mitzie Hunter	21,299	2.93%
Chloe Brown	18,831	2.60%
Brad Bradford	9,254	1.28%
Chris Saccoccia	8,001	1.10%
Anthony Perruzza	3,025	0.42%
Xiao Hua Gong	2,983	0.41%
Lyall Sanders	2,775	0.38%
Giorgio Mammoliti	1,105	0.15%
Bahira Abdulsalam	913	0.13%
Sharif Ahmed	814	0.11%
Raksheni Sivaneswaran	779	0.11%
Dionysios Apostolopoulos	726	0.10%
Logan Choy	695	0.10%
Toby Heaps	593	0.08%
Roland Chan	515	0.07%
Reginald Tull	482	0.07%
Rob Davis	378	0.05%
Jamie Atkinson	361	0.05%
Frank D'Amico	357	0.05%
Gru Jesse Allan	352	0.05%
Frank D'Angelo	343	0.05%
Eliazar Bonilla	310	0.04%
Heather He	297	0.04%
Kiri Vadivelu	290	0.04%
Jose Baking	284	0.04%
Danny Chevalier Romero	281	0.04%
Monica Forrester	278	0.04%
Cleveland Marshall	270	0.04%
Kevin Clarke	265	0.04%
Blake Acton	264	0.04%
Mark LeLiever	259	0.04%
Thomas Hall	258	0.04%
Asadul Alam	257	0.04%
Faizul Mohee	255	0.03%
Celina Caesar-Chavannes	254	0.03%
Knia Singh	246	0.03%
Rick Lee	241	0.03%
Emmanuel Acquaye	236	0.03%
Willie Reodica	225	0.03%
Patricia Johnston	217	0.03%
Gordon Cohen	214	0.03%
Ben Bankas	203	0.03%
Bob Murphy	203	0.03%
Feng Gao	198	0.03%
Habiba Desai	196	0.03%
Sarah Climenhaga	195	0.03%
Darren Atkinson	192	0.03%
D!ONNE Renée	188	0.03%
Nathalie Xian Yi Yan	180	0.02%
Ari Grosman	177	0.02%
Paul Collins	168	0.02%
Sandeep Srivastava	166	0.02%
Monowar Hossain	164	0.02%
Norman MacLeod	163	0.02%
Jody Williams	160	0.02%
Claudette Beals	151	0.02%
Mason Carrie	150	0.02%
Atef Aly	147	0.02%
Syed Jaffery	147	0.02%
Kris Langenfeld	137	0.02%
Matti Charlton	134	0.02%
Partap Dua Singh	132	0.02%
Meir Straus	129	0.02%
Samson Deb	129	0.02%
Peter Handjis	127	0.02%
Steve Mann	127	0.02%
Weizhen Tang	125	0.02%
David Gulyas	120	0.02%
Michael Lamoureux	120	0.02%
Glen Benway	118	0.02%
John Winter	118	0.02%
Michael Jensen	115	0.02%
Robert Shusterman	114	0.02%
Brian Buffey	113	0.02%
Scott Furnival	110	0.02%
Walayat Khan	109	0.01%
Adil Goraya	104	0.01%
James Guglielmin	101	0.01%
Simryn Fenby	97	0.01%
Cory Deville	96	0.01%
Serge Korovitsyn	96	0.01%
Rocco Schipano	94	0.01%
Brian Graff	89	0.01%
Isabella Gamk	88	0.01%
Michael Nicula	88	0.01%
Jeffery Tunney	83	0.01%
Yuanqian Wei	78	0.01%
John Ransome	75	0.01%
Mitchell Toye	72	0.01%
Phillip D'Cruze	68	0.01%
Walter Rubino	67	0.01%
John Letonja	45	0.01%
Sheila Igodan	42	0.01%
Erwin Sniedzins	38	0.01%
Jamil Nowwarah	38	0.01%
Jack Weenen	30	0.00%
Daniel Irmya	27	0.00%
	722,877	100%

=== By ward ===
Olivia Chow had the highest percentage of votes in Ward 13 Toronto Centre with 54.6 per cent, Ana Bailão had the highest in Ward 8 Eglinton—Lawrence with 46.8 per cent, Mark Saunders had the highest in the Ward 1 Etobicoke North with 15.4 per cent, and the candidates other than the top three had collectively the highest in the Ward 7 Humber River—Black Creek with 33.0 per cent.

Ward	Chow	Bailão	Saunders	Others
City-wide	37.16%	32.46%	8.59%	21.79%
1 Etobicoke North	27.90%	32.25%	15.40%	24.45%
2 Etobicoke Centre	21.22%	44.46%	13.62%	20.48%
3 Etobicoke—Lakeshore	29.45%	40.22%	10.21%	20.12%
4 Parkdale—High Park	49.66%	25.99%	4.83%	19.22%
5 York South—Weston	29.57%	39.27%	9.87%	21.29%
6 York Centre	23.98%	41.45%	11.26%	23.31%
7 Humber River—Black Creek	28.14%	28.16%	10.73%	32.97%
8 Eglinton—Lawrence	23.75%	46.80%	8.51%	20.94%
9 Davenport	49.78%	30.14%	3.62%	16.46%
10 Spadina—Fort York	49.71%	24.15%	6.21%	19.93%
11 University—Rosedale	46.85%	29.27%	5.41%	18.47%
12 Toronto—St. Paul's	33.55%	30.30%	5.56%	30.59%
13 Toronto Centre	54.60%	20.70%	4.92%	19.78%
14 Toronto—Danforth	51.89%	24.36%	4.64%	19.11%
15 Don Valley West	26.14%	43.10%	10.22%	20.54%
16 Don Valley East	33.51%	33.58%	9.81%	23.10%
17 Don Valley North	33.83%	34.81%	11.62%	19.74%
18 Willowdale	34.86%	34.66%	11.27%	19.21%
19 Beaches—East York	43.07%	28.23%	5.68%	23.02%
20 Scarborough Southwest	35.70%	30.61%	9.88%	23.81%
21 Scarborough Centre	34.56%	30.62%	11.17%	23.65%
22 Scarborough—Agincourt	39.92%	29.04%	11.20%	19.84%
23 Scarborough North	47.15%	23.64%	10.62%	18.59%
24 Scarborough—Guildwood	30.51%	28.37%	9.88%	31.24%
25 Scarborough—Rouge Park	32.37%	32.53%	10.63%	24.47%
