= Xiao Hua Gong =

Canadian businessman

Xiao Hua (Edward) Gong
- 龚晓华

Deputy Director of the China Council for the Promotion of International Trade
- In office 2013–2016

Personal details
- Born: 1965 (age 60–61) China
- Party: Independent (since 2016)
- Occupation: Businessman, politician

Chinese name
- Traditional Chinese: 龔曉華
- Simplified Chinese: 龚晓华
Transcriptions
Standard Mandarin
- Hanyu Pinyin: Gōng Xiǎohuá
- Wade–Giles: Kung Hsiao Hua
Yue: Cantonese
- Yale Romanization: Gūng Híu-wàh
- Jyutping: Gung^{1} Hiu^{2}-waa^{4}

Xiao Hua Gong (Chinese: 龚晓华; pinyin: Gōng Xiǎohuá; born c. 1965), also known as Edward Gong, is a Chinese-Canadian businessman, perennial candidate and former theatre director. Gong served as deputy director of the China Council for the Promotion of International Trade from 2013 to 2016. He owns Canada National Television (CNTV), a Chinese-language television station based in Markham, Ontario.

Gong has been the subject of criminal and regulatory proceedings concerning an international pyramid scheme. In 2021, his company, Edward Enterprise International Group, pleaded guilty to operating a pyramid scheme and forging documents, while criminal charges against Gong personally were withdrawn. The company was fined and ordered to make substantial payments to the Canada Revenue Agency. Gong also agreed to forfeit approximately NZ$68 million and property in New Zealand as part of a settlement with police. In 2024, he admitted violations of Ontario securities law and agreed to a permanent ban on most securities trading and certain corporate positions.

Gong has contested several elections, including the 2023 Toronto mayoral by-election, in which he finished 11th with 2,983 votes (0.4%). His extensive election advertising attracted media attention. He subsequently ran in the 2024 Mississauga mayoral by-election, finishing ninth, and contested Don Valley North as an independent in the 2025 Canadian federal election. In the 2026 Toronto mayoral election, he finished fifth with 3,443 votes (0.35%).

== Biography ==
Gong was born in China, where he worked as a theatre director, putting on opera and Shakespeare plays. In 2002, he moved to Canada, and in 2008, he obtained Canadian citizenship and abandoned his Chinese citizenship. Gong acquired hotels in Toronto and Michigan, including the Edward Hotel & Convention Center, and started two Chinese-language television stations.

In 2013, Gong became a deputy director on the China Council for the Promotion of International Trade and was part of a 2014 Chinese delegation led by vice premier Wang Yang to Finland and Slovenia.

He was known for appearing in a 2016 photo with Justin Trudeau at a Toronto Chinese Community fundraiser. The group is shown making dumplings, Gong's presence drew attention to Trudeau's cash-for-access dealings.

=== Pyramid scheme ===
Starting in 2017, Gong was investigated by the Chinese Ministry of Public Security, the New Zealand Police, and the Royal Canadian Mounted Police and Financial Transactions and Reports Analysis Centre of Canada over his financial dealings. According to the Ontario Securities Commission (OSC), Gong allegedly fraudulently sold stock in O24, his health-supplements company, to people in China, and stored $140 million in Canadian bank accounts, and most of the remainder in New Zealand bank accounts.

Gong and his company, Edward Enterprise International Group Inc., faced criminal charges in Canada over the scheme. In February 2021, as part of a settlement agreement, Gong pleaded guilty in the Ontario Superior Court of Justice (SCJ) on behalf of his company to forging documents and pyramid scheme selling and had his four personal charges withdrawn. Gong had challenged the use of evidence allegedly coerced from him by Chinese authorities. As part of the settlement, the SCJ fined Gong's company, $756,000, imposed a $229,500 victim surcharge and ordered $15 million to be paid to the Canada Revenue Agency.

In June 2021, Gong forfeited NZ$68 million and some Auckland-based property to the New Zealand government as part of a settlement over pyramid scheme activities in the country. According to the New Zealand Police, it was the largest forfeiture of the proceeds of crime in New Zealand history since the implementation of the forfeiture law in 2009. His accounts in the country had previously been frozen in 2018.

In 2022, the Ontario Securities Commission brought a regulatory enforcement case against Gong, arguing that he committed securities fraud and unregistered trading during his operation of the pyramid scheme. In November 2022, Gong challenged the OSC's use of information it had obtained in its investigation that had previously been used in the criminal case. The Capital Markets Tribunal rejected Gong's challenge in February 2023, and that rejection was upheld by the SCJ in June 2023.

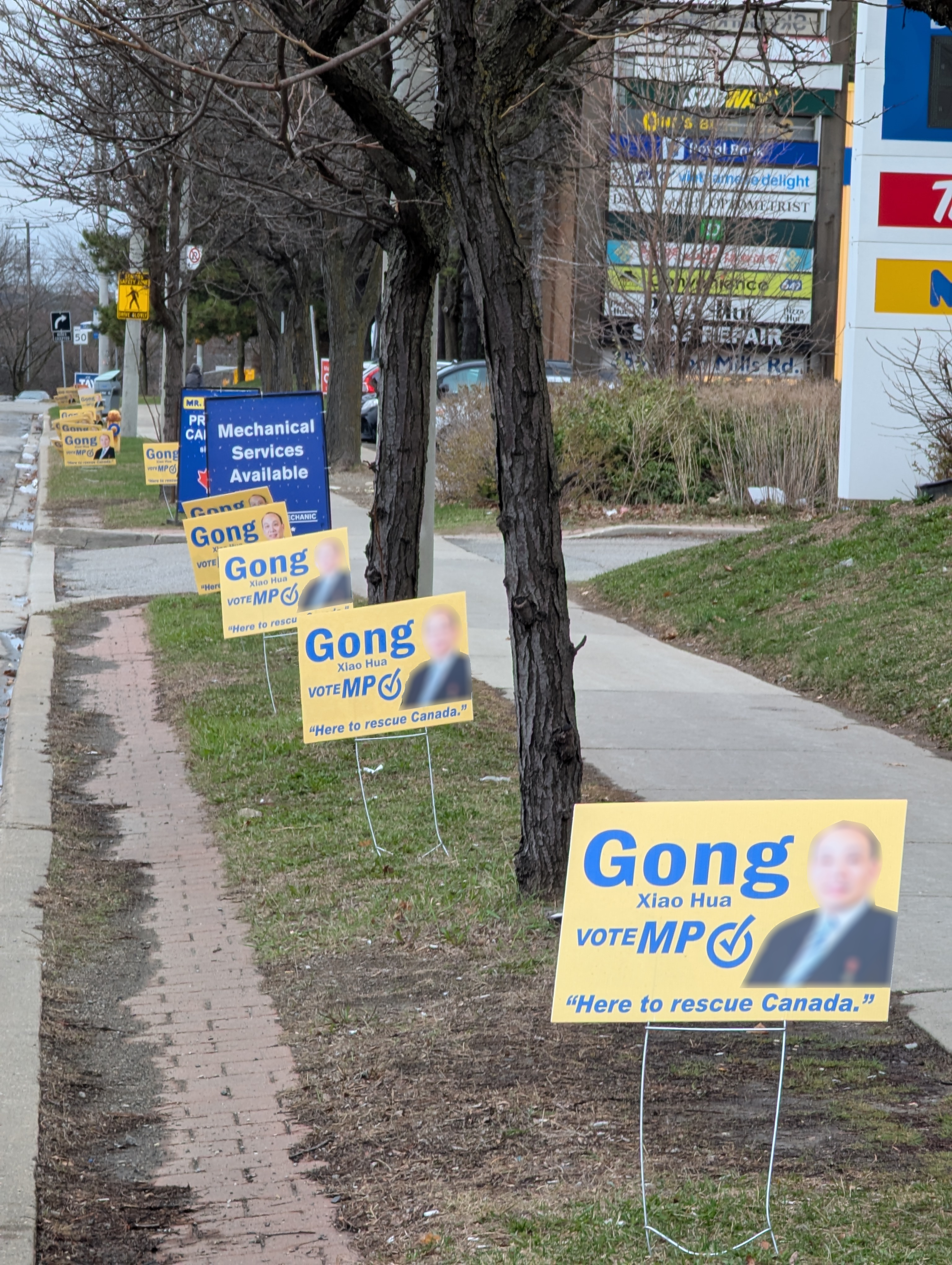
Election signs in Toronto for Gong during the 2025 Canadian federal election

=== 2023 Toronto mayoral run ===
In 2023, Gong ran for Mayor of Toronto, with campaign promises including hiring 1,000 new police officers, cutting property taxes by $1,000 and making public transit free to ride for riders aged over 55 or under 18.

During the campaign, media queried the quantity and cost of his election advertising, with ads posted on television, buses and subway stations. He also posted his advertisement on one of the giant illuminated billboards at Yonge–Dundas Square (now Sankofa Square) in downtown Toronto. He also participated in the 2023 Toronto Pride parade, with Gong on a float, dressed in a superhero-style outfit sounding a gong.

Gong finished 11th with 2,983 votes (0.4% of votes cast). The following day, Gong questioned the results and called for a recount on Twitter.

In Student Vote Toronto, a mock by-election, 21.7 percent of participating elementary and secondary students voted for Gong placing him in second place after Olivia Chow with 23.4 percent. Some schools voted Gong by over 50 percent.

=== 2024 Mississauga mayoral run ===
Bonnie Crombie, Mayor of Mississauga, was elected the Ontario Liberal Party leader in December 2023. Subsequently, she announced her resignation as mayor the next day, vacating the seat in January. The 2024 Mississauga mayoral by-election was soon called.

Gong registered as a mayoral candidate on the second last day for registration. A spokesperson told the Toronto Star newspaper that Gong owns property in the city, qualifying him for the run.

Gong placed 9th overall in the election with 0.43% of the vote.

=== 2025 Canadian federal election ===
In the 2025 Canadian federal election, Gong ran as an MP with no party affiliation in the Don Valley North Riding. He finished with 260 votes (0.5%), putting him last place in the riding.

Yet in Student Vote Canada 2025, the mock student election, Gong finished third with 13.62% of the vote, ahead of the New Democrat candidate.

=== 2026 Toronto mayoral election ===
On May 6, Gong registered for the 2026 Toronto mayoral election as Edward Gong. His primary campaign promises were to reduce property taxes and provide city residents with a one-time $1,000 payment. He finished fifth among 53 candidates, receiving 3,443 votes (0.35% of valid votes cast).

== Electoral record ==
=== Federal ===
2025 Canadian federal election: Don Valley North
Party	Candidate	Votes	%	±%	Expenditures
Liberal	Maggie Chi	25,822	53.22	+0.45	
Conservative	Joe Tay	20,546	42.34	+9.80	
New Democratic	Naila Saeed	1,191	2.45	–7.47	
Green	Andrew Armstrong	448	0.92	–0.89	
No affiliation	Xiaohua Gong	260	0.54	N/A	
People's	Ivan Milivojevic	260	0.54	–2.41	
Total valid votes/expense limit					
Total rejected ballots					
Turnout		48,531	62.63		
Eligible voters		77,486			
Liberal hold		Swing		–4.68	
Source: Elections Canada

=== Municipal ===
2026 Toronto mayoral election
Mayoral candidate	Votes	%
Olivia Chow	532,201	54.16%
Brad Bradford	404,013	41.11%
Braeden Chow	8,102	0.82%
Chris Alexander	3,550	0.36%
Edward Gong	3,443	0.35%
Laura Dean	2,224	0.23%
Darrell Brown	2,077	0.21%
Imad Abdulkadir	1,873	0.19%
Bahira Abdulsalam	1,696	0.17%
Rick Lee	1,288	0.13%
Logan Choy	1,282	0.13%
Sandeep Srivastava	1,149	0.12%
Kevin Clarke	1,089	0.11%
Georgios Kalkounis	1,085	0.11%
Roberto Curto	959	0.10%
Sarah McVie	957	0.10%
Jamie Atkinson	932	0.09%
Amy Rosen	919	0.09%
Paul Collins	845	0.09%
Lyall Sanders	784	0.08%
Mohamad Kaaki	727	0.07%
Joshua Thompson	709	0.07%
Brian Buffey	649	0.07%
Laura Ellis	630	0.06%
Michael Lamoureux	570	0.06%
Robert Shusterman	522	0.05%
Cory Deville	485	0.05%
Odessa Paloma Parker	457	0.05%
Martin Fraser	437	0.04%
Alton Frederick	432	0.04%
Heather He	421	0.04%
Mostafa Zandkarimi	396	0.04%
Faizan Haider	370	0.04%
Alex Cruze	366	0.04%
Kuo Yu Tong	366	0.04%
Habiba Desai	364	0.04%
Weizhen Tang	354	0.04%
Francis Mercieca	352	0.04%
Thomas Hall	341	0.03%
Faisal Razi	337	0.03%
Gus Prokos	327	0.03%
Jack Hartley	322	0.03%
Joseph Osuji	320	0.03%
Naomi Sayers	274	0.03%
Peter Handjis	270	0.03%
Isidoros Kyrlangitses	256	0.03%
Leila Yohannes	206	0.02%
Reagan Levermany	202	0.02%
Eddie Mayanja	193	0.02%
Wincess Dorville	175	0.02%
Henoke Yohannes	157	0.02%
Jeffery Tunney	133	0.01%
Jack Weenen	72	0.01%
Total	982,660	100%
Source: City of Toronto (unofficial results)

2024 Mississauga mayoral by-election, June 10, 2024 Resignation of Bonnie Crombie
Candidate	Popular vote			Expenditures
Candidate	Votes	%	±%	Expenditures
Carolyn Parrish	43,494	31.06	–	$524,816.30
Alvin Tedjo	35,005	25.00	–	$300,278.25
Dipika Damerla	27,119	19.37	–	$576,469.83
Stephen Dasko	22,408	16.00	–	$291,998.83
David Shaw	2,843	2.03	-6.80	$4,511.51
Brian Crombie	2,242	1.60	–	$9,888.92
Frank Fang	1,694	1.21	–	$17,269.65
George Tavares	962	0.69	-4.63	$163.42
Xiao Hua Gong	598	0.43	–	$45,166.50
Diya Atassi	545	0.39	–	$8,522.66
Zulfiqar Ali	528	0.38	–	$971.23
Mike Matulewicz	424	0.30	–	none listed
Sinisa Mandrapa	417	0.30	–	$25,534.00
Sara Iqbal	359	0.26	–	$0.00
Jamie Dookie	302	0.22	–	$846.00
Nathalie Xian Yi Yan	297	0.21	–	$1,200.00
Mitchell MacEachern	238	0.17	–	$0.00
Winston Harding	206	0.15	–	$1,575.00
Mohsin Khan	170	0.12	–	$0.00
Syed Jaffery	169	0.12	–	$8,116.00
Total valid votes	140,020	99.89		
Rejected, unmarked and declined	161	0.11		
Turnout	140,181	25.67	+3.83	
Eligible voters	545,512			
Note: Candidate campaign colours are based on the prominent colour used in campaign items (signs, literature, etc.) or colours used in polling graphs and are used as a visual differentiation between candidates.
Sources: City of Mississauga

2023 Toronto mayoral by-election
Candidate	Votes	%
Olivia Chow	269,372	37.26
Ana Bailão	235,175	32.53
Mark Saunders	62,167	8.60
Anthony Furey	35,899	4.97
Josh Matlow	35,572	4.92
Mitzie Hunter	21,229	2.94
Chloe Brown	18,831	2.61
Brad Bradford	9,254	1.28
Chris Saccoccia	8,001	1.11
Anthony Perruzza	3,025	0.42
Xiao Hua Gong	2,983	0.41
91 other candidates	23,130	3.20
Total	722,877	100.00
Source: City of Toronto
