= Toronto St. Paul's =

Toronto—St. Paul's may refer to:

- Toronto—St. Paul's (federal electoral district), federal riding in Toronto, Ontario, Canada
- Toronto—St. Paul's (provincial electoral district), provincial riding in Toronto, Ontario, Canada
- Ward 12 Toronto—St. Paul's, municipal ward in Toronto, Ontario, Canada
