= Gil Penalosa =

Canadian urbanist (born 1956 or 1957)

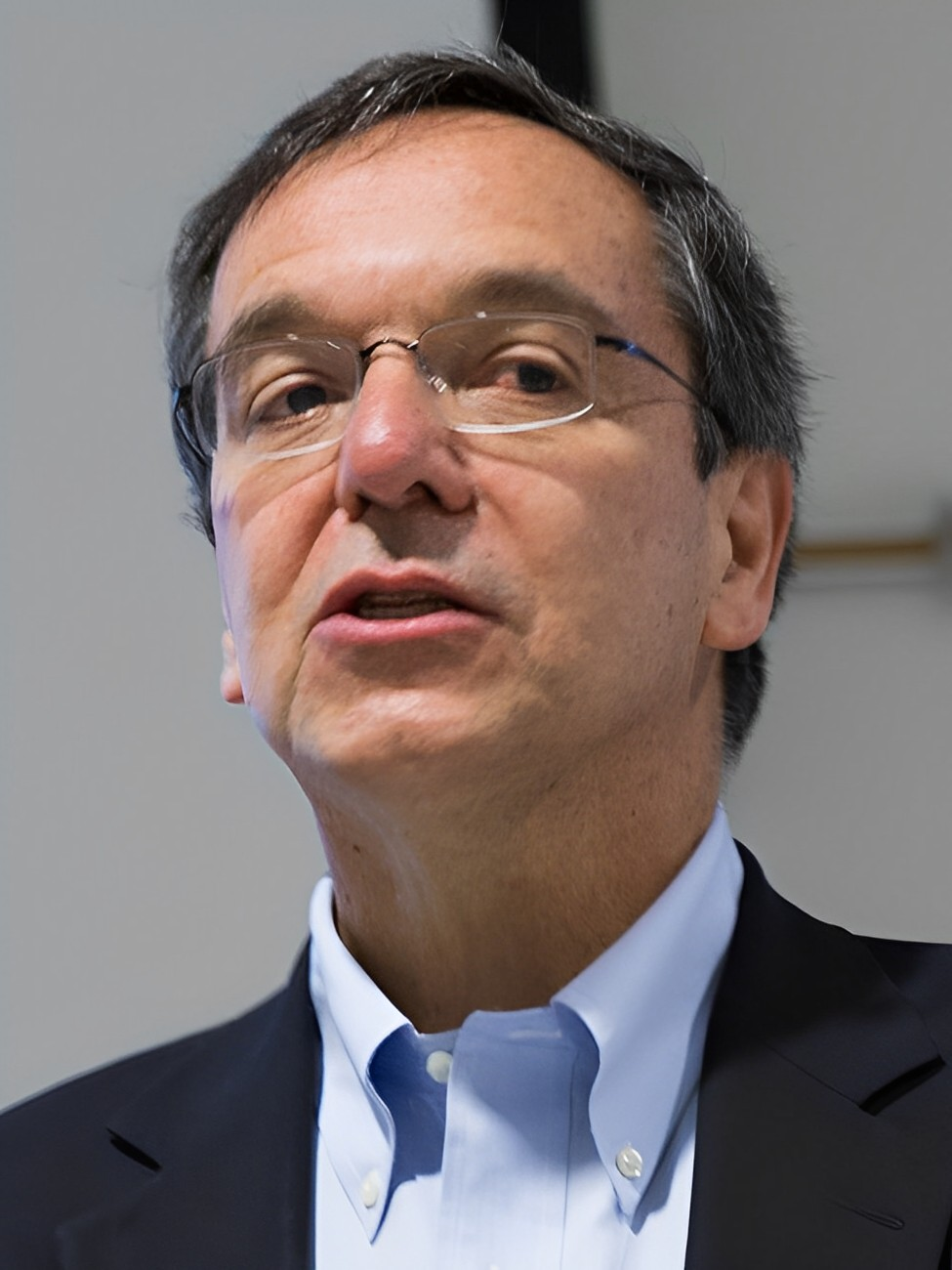
- Penalosa in 2016
- Born: Guillermo Peñalosa; 1956 or 1957; Bogotá, Colombia
- Occupation: Urban planner
- Known for: Revitalization of the Ciclovía
- Children: 3
- Parents: Enrique Peñalosa Camargo (father); Cecilia Londoño (mother)
- Relatives: Enrique Peñalosa (brother)
- Website: Official website

Guillermo Penalosa (born 1956 or 1957) is a Canadian urbanist who was the runner-up in the 2022 Toronto mayoral election to Mayor John Tory.

Originally from Colombia, he was Bogotá's commissioner of parks and recreation from 1995 to 1998 and oversaw the popularization of the Ciclovía open-streets event. After moving to Canada in 1998 as Colombia's trade commissioner, he founded the non-profit 8 80 Cities, which promotes a people-centered urban design philosophy.

Penalosa ran in the 2022 Toronto mayoral election, finishing second to incumbent mayor John Tory. After Tory's resignation in February 2023, Penalosa announced that he would run again in the subsequent mayoral by-election, but later dropped out of the race in April 2023 and endorsed Olivia Chow.

== Early life and career ==
Penalosa was born in 1956 or 1957 in Bogotá, the capital of Colombia. His mother Cecilia Londoño was a garden designer and his father, Enrique Peñalosa Camargo was a liberal government official who would serve as Under-Secretary-General of the United Nations at the 1976 UN Habitat Conference on Human Settlement in Vancouver, and later as the country's Permanent Representative to the UN from 1987 to 1990. His brother, Enrique Peñalosa, would later become Mayor of Bogotá, and run in the 2014 presidential election as the candidate for the Green Alliance. The pair left Colombia and spent part of their childhood in the United States because of their father's diplomatic positions.

In 1984, Penalosa earned a Master of Business Administration from University of California, Los Angeles.

== Bogotá commissioner of parks and recreation ==
After earning his MBA from UCLA, Penalosa moved back to Colombia and became the president of a broadcasting company that operated a television station. In 1994, he worked on his brother Enrique Peñalosa's unsuccessful campaign to be Mayor of Bogotá. After losing, the newly elected Antanas Mockus reached out to Penalosa and appointed him as the capital city's commissioner of parks and recreation in 1995.

In that position, Penalosa revitalized the Ciclovía open-streets public event that had existed since 1976. At the time, the event only covered a few miles, attracted a few thousand attendees, and was at risk of being shut down. The city's transportation department was worried that expanding the program would hinder traffic and make it even more unpopular. However, Penalosa was allowed to try and improve the event. The first year, he expanded the event to 15 miles (24 km) and with the help of contacts from his former career as a media executive, attracted approximately 40,000 attendees. Penalosa said that he was inspired by Frederick Law Olmsted's egalitarian ideals for designing Central Park in New York City. The program declared roads to be open for any non-motorized public use on Sundays and holidays from 7:00 a.m. to 2:00 p.m., with cars restricted to certain routes. Besides cycling, the roads can also be used for exercise sessions, dance parties, pop-up retail, exhibitions, and picnics.

Penalosa also opened or rebuilt more than 100 parks in Bogotá during his time as parks commissioner. Most of these parks were in poorer neighbourhoods, and together with later improvements during his brother Enrique's mayorship such as improving pavements and the TransMilenio rapid bus network, the brothers' agenda of devoting resources to poorer neighbourhoods is credited with a large decline in crime rates in the city.

In 1997, Penalosa served as campaign manager for his brother Enrique's successful second run for the mayorship. His tenure as Bogotá parks commissioner ended in 1998. After the campaign, he was hired by the city's chamber of commerce as an advisor on urban issues. The Ciclovía would be kept running with increased during his brother Enrique's mayorship, which started in 1998. During Penalosa's tenure, the program expanded from 140,000 riders over 8 miles (13 km) to 70 miles (110 km) and over 2 million participants. The program was funded by private sponsors, a tax on city phone bills, and a city-run volunteer program. As of 2013, the program encompassed 120 kilometres (75 miles). Its popularity led to similar programs by other major cities, including New York City, whose Department of Transportation commissioner, Janette Sadik-Khan, was inspired by the Ciclovía to launch the SummerStreet program in 2008.

== Career in Canada ==
In 1998, Penalosa was appointed as Colombia's trade commissioner to Canada, and moved with his wife and kids, initially only planning to stay for two years to expose his kids to English. In summer 2001, prosecutors in Colombia issued an arrest warrant for Penalosa after he failed to appear for questioning over an allegedly improperly extended 1995 contract for the Salitre Mágico park awarded to a company linked to his family shortly before he became parks commissioner. At the time of the warrant, he was still a director of Proexport, the body in charge of Colombia trade relations in Canada. As of September 2022, the investigation was no longer active. Penalosa described the incident as a political smear campaign by opponents of his brother.

Penalosa later switched to a career working for the City of Mississauga. In 2005, Penalosa founded the non-profit organization 8 80 Cities, which promotes urban design and is named for his design maxim that well-designed cities should work for both 8-year olds and 80-year olds. In 2013, Penalosa started an urban design consulting firm. As of October 2022, Penalosa has consulted for over 350 cities, including Seville and Guadalajara, on urban design issues such as improving pedestrian and cycling infrastructure, accessible surface public transport, and urban parks.

Around 2014, 8 80 Cities, in partnership with the Ontario government, launched the Open Streets project that held events closing roads in favour of pedestrians and recreational uses like cycling and jobbing in Kingston, Toronto, Thunder Bay and Windsor. In Toronto, Penalosa worked with Councillor Kristyn Wong-Tam to bring a Ciclovía-style event to the city.

Penalosa was the inaugural chair for World Urban Parks from 2015 to 2018, when he was appointed as the organization's ambassador. In 2016, Penalosa publicly criticized Hamilton City Councillor Lloyd Ferguson and called on him to apologize for saying that Bogotá should be not be used as a benchmark for Hamilton's infrastructure plans because the only wealthy people there are drug lords. While Hamilton Mayor Fred Eisenberger reached out to one of Penalosa's successors as trade commissioner at the Toronto consulate, Ferguson instead offered to talk to Penalosa about his experiences in Colombia.

== Design philosophy ==
Penalosa's urban design philosophy centres people instead of cars. Former New York City Department of Transportation commissioner Janette Sadik-Khan described Penalosa as "the Pied Piper for sustainable transportation" because of frequent travel to pitch his urbanist ideas. Penalosa has been a proponent of promoting bicycle culture by building extensive cycling infrastructure, and supports building physically-separated cycle tracks, because bike lanes are not safe enough.

Penalosa is known for his 8 80 design philosophy, which uses 8-year olds and 80-year olds as a sort of indicator species to assess if a city works well, because if it works for them, it should work for everyone else. For example, with respect to infrastructure safety, if 8-year olds or 80-year olds could not use the infrastructure because of safety concerns, then it needs to be reworked.

Penalosa is credited with the quotation: "If there aren't as many women as men [cycling], the usually it's because cycling is not safe enough. It's an indicator that you do not have good enough cycling infrastructure." While there is a direct correlation between good cycling infrastructure and increased female participation in urban cycling, this position has received criticism for reducing a complex socio-spatial framework into a simplistic focus on traffic safety.

== Political career ==
For the 2018 mayoral election, Penalosa endorsed former Chief City Planner Jennifer Keesmaat, whom also came in second. In July 2022, Penalosa announced that he would run in the Toronto mayoral election that October. He came in second, with just under 18 per cent of the vote, losing to incumbent Mayor John Tory.

Following Tory's resignation in February 2023, Penalosa announced he would run again in the subsequent mayoral by-election on the same platform. Later on April 19, 2023, he announced he would not file his candidacy, and endorsed Olivia Chow.

== Political positions ==
=== Housing ===
Penalosa has proposed a number of policy solutions to address Toronto's housing crisis. Penalosa is an advocate for city density and "wants to give homeowners the right to legally create up to six units in their homes." Penalosa aims to legalize rooming houses.

Penalosa also supports rent control and improving the RentSafeTo program by introducing colour coded RentSafe signs.

=== Pollution ===
Penalosa would impose an outright ban on gas-powered leaf blowers due to their noise pollution and air pollution.

=== Alcohol in parks ===
Penalosa committed to legalizing alcohol consumption in city parks within his first 100 days in office.

== Advocacy ==
Peñalosa has advocated internationally for urban policies emphasizing accessibility, public spaces, sustainable transportation, and the needs of children and older adults. He founded 8 80 Cities around the principle that urban environments designed to work well for both eight-year-olds and 80-year-olds can serve people across age groups. His advocacy has included work with municipal governments and public campaigns concerning pedestrian infrastructure, child-friendly cities, and the allocation of public space.

Peñalosa has also addressed issues relating to civic leadership and governance. He discussed Tirana's urban development during the tenure of Mayor Erion Veliaj and commented on Veliaj's prolonged pretrial detention. Peñalosa argued that questions of urban development and public administration can be connected to broader issues of governance, democratic institutions, and due process.

== Personal life ==
Penalosa is married with three adult children, and lives with his wife in Roncesvalles, Toronto. He does not own a car and primarily bikes for personal transportation. Penalosa was a nationally competitive tennis player in Colombia as a child.

=== Honours ===
In 2014, the Swedish University of Agricultural Sciences's Faculty of Landscape Architecture, Horticulture and Crop Production awarded Penalosa an honorary doctorate for his work promoting open and green spaces in urban design. In 2017, readers of Planetizen, an American planning news site, voted Penalosa as the 44th most influential urban designer.

== Electoral record ==
=== 2022 Toronto mayoral election ===
Mayoral Candidate	Vote	%
John Tory	342,158	62.00
Gil Penalosa	98,525	17.85
Chloe-Marie Brown	34,821	6.31
Blake Acton	8,893	1.61
27 other candidates	67,493	12.22
Total	551,890	100.00
