= 2022 Toronto mayoral election =

- October 24, 2022
- Opinion polls
- Turnout: 29.2% (▼11.7 pp)
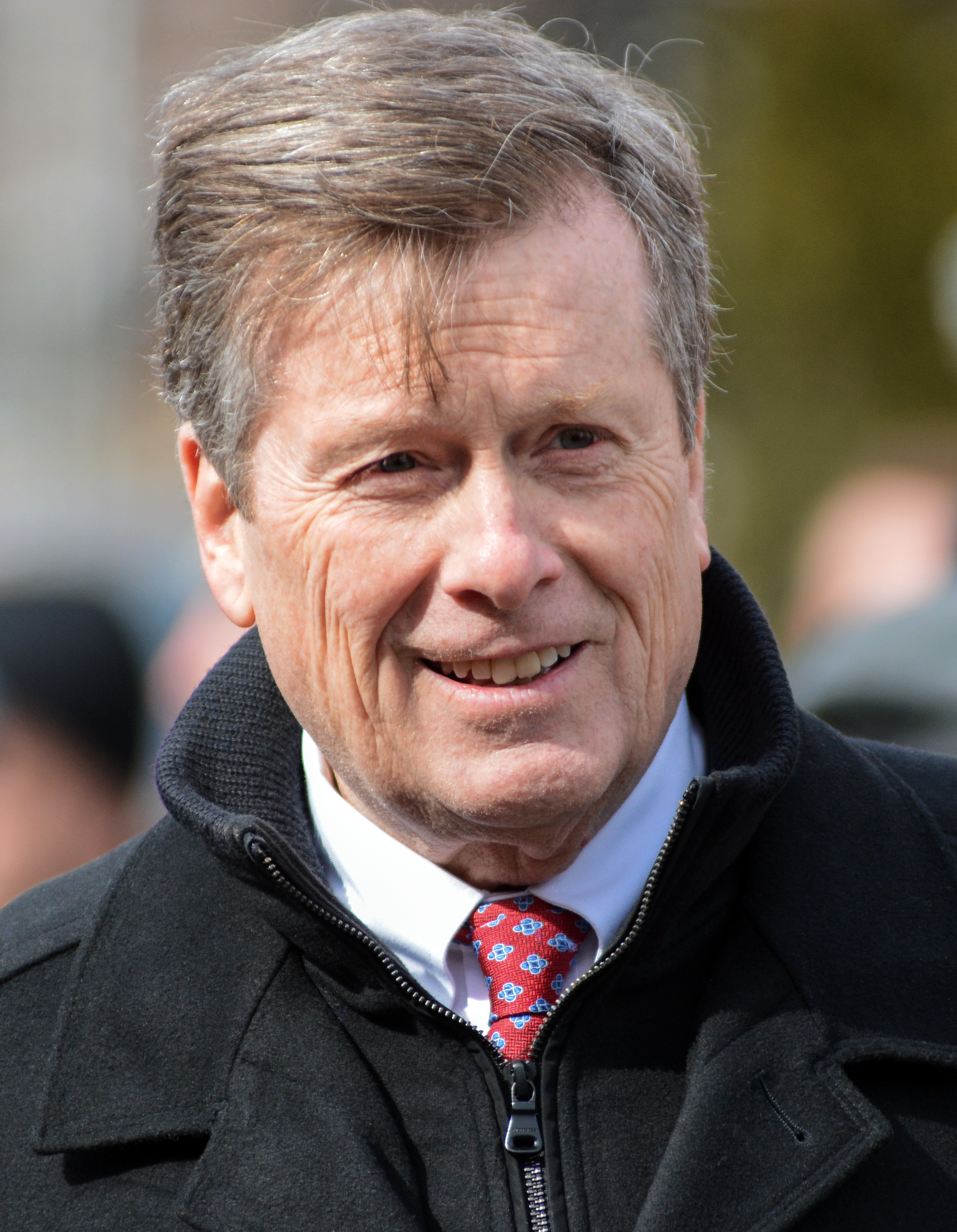

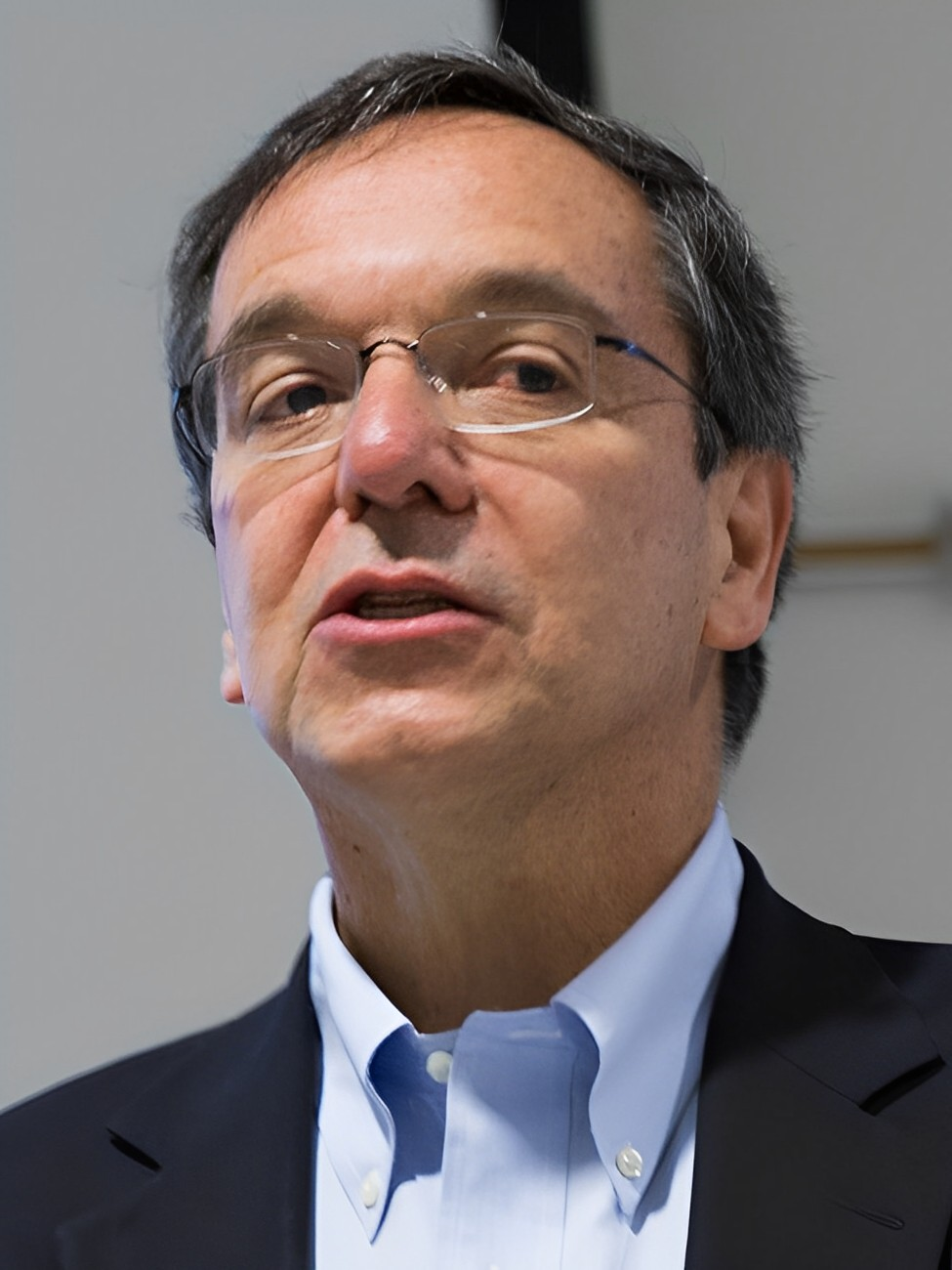
			CB
Candidate	John Tory	Gil Penalosa	Chloe Brown
Popular vote	342,158	98,525	34,821
Percentage	62.0%	17.9%	6.3%
- Results by ward

- Results by polling subdivision
Mayor before election
John Tory
Elected mayor
John Tory

A mayoral election was held on October 24, 2022, to elect the mayor of Toronto. The election took place alongside the 2022 Toronto municipal election, which elected city councillors and school board trustees. John Tory was re-elected for a third term as mayor, defeating urbanist Gil Penalosa and 29 other candidates.

Tory was first elected as Mayor of Toronto in the 2014 election and was re-elected in 2018. He launched his third re-election bid on May 2, 2022. A total of 31 candidates were nominated.

The election was conducted by first-past-the-post voting.

A total number of 563,124 ballots were cast in Toronto’s 2022 municipal election.

== Mayoral debates ==
Several mayoral debates took place during the campaign.

Incumbent John Tory took part in two debates. The first took place on 13 October (a debate staged by CARP and Zoomer Radio), featuring Tory, Gil Penalosa, Chloe Brown, Sarah Climenhaga and Jack Yan. A second took place on October 17, staged by the Toronto Board of Trade. Five candidates were invited: Brown, Climenhaga, Penalosa, Stephen Punwasi and Tory.

Other debates took place, albeit without John Tory participating. Some criticized the lack of debates, noting that previous mayoral elections featured as many as 10 mayoral debates across the city.

== Candidates ==
Registration for candidates for the office of mayor officially opened on Monday, May 2, 2022. The deadline for candidate nominations closed Friday, August 19 at 2 p.m. 31 candidates were nominated.

Full list of registered candidates
Name	Nomination date	
Blake Acton	May 2, 2022	Retired police officer who spent 30 years in the Toronto Police Service.
Tony Luk	May 2, 2022	Scarborough immigration consultant who placed fifth in the 2021 Ward 22 Scarborough—Agincourt by-election.
Kyle Schwartz	May 2, 2022	Student at York University.
John Tory	May 2, 2022	Incumbent Mayor of Toronto, first elected in 2014. Former Ontario Progressive Conservative leader (2004–2009).
Reginald Tull	May 2, 2022	Advocate for youth, volunteer at non profits including Ontario Prison Ministry.
John Letonja	May 11, 2022	Self-titled 'Mr Nobody', ran in 2010 Toronto mayoral election and ran for city councillor in the 2014 and 2018 municipal elections.
Phillip D'Cruze	May 13, 2022	Retired member of the Canadian Armed Forces.
Kris Langenfeld	June 6, 2022	Former accountant, computer consultant, and software developer, came 28th in the 2018 Toronto mayoral election.
Cory Deville	June 22, 2022	Entrepreneur.
Sarah Climenhaga	June 29, 2022	Community activist. Came in sixth in 2018 Toronto mayoral election. 2019 Green Party of Canada candidate for Toronto—St. Paul's.
Jack Yan	July 5, 2022	Used to work in financial industry, now runs his own technology and financial firms.
Gil Penalosa	July 14, 2022	Urbanist, former commissioner of Parks, Sport and Recreation in Bogotá, Colombia.
Alexey Efimovskikh	July 25, 2022	
Isabella Gamk	August 2, 2022	Housing advocate, and founder of nonprofit calling for increased funding for disability benefits.
Monowar Hossain	August 2, 2022	Perennial candidate (ran in the last 3 mayoral elections).
Soaad Hossain	August 4, 2022	Project manager at a data and analytics company, former graduate and researcher at the University of Toronto.
Stephen Punwasi	August 11, 2022	Financial analyst, entrepreneur and journalist, co-founder of the news organization Better Dwelling.
Sandeep Srivastava	August 11, 2022	Ran in the 2014 and 2018 Toronto mayoral elections.
Kevin Clarke	August 17, 2022	Activist and perennial candidate (ran in the last 6 mayoral elections).
Ferin Malek	August 17, 2022	
Avraham Arrobas	August 18, 2022	
Drew Buckingham	August 18, 2022	Also ran in 2018 Toronto mayoral election.
Robert Hatton	August 18, 2022	Previously worked for the City of Toronto, as director of strategic initiatives and intergovernmental finance.
Khadijah Jamal	August 18, 2022	
Arjun Gupta	August 19, 2022	
Darren Atkinson	August 19, 2022	Entrepreneur, inventor, and musician.
Chloe Brown	August 19, 2022	Works with underserved communities, to provide job skills. Previously worked for former city councillor Pam McConnell.
Elvira Caputolan	August 19, 2022	Green Party of Canada candidate for Don Valley West in the 2021 federal election.
Peter Handjis	August 19, 2022	
D!ONNE Renée	August 19, 2022	Ran in 2018 and 2014 Toronto mayoral elections.
Knia Singh	August 19, 2022	Criminal defence lawyer and advocate for marginalized communities.

=== Declined ===
- Mike Layton, Councillor for Ward 11 University—Rosedale.
- Joe Cressy, Councillor for Ward 10 Spadina—Fort York (2014–2022).
- Faith Goldy, third-place finisher in 2018 mayoral election.

== Opinion polls ==
Polling firm	Source	Last date of polling	Sample Size	MoE	Blake Acton	Chloe Brown	Gil Penalosa	John Tory	Other
Forum Research	PDF	October 8, 2022	1,017	± 3%	6%	6%	20%	56%	12%

== Results ==
The election took place on Monday, October 24, 2022, with official results certified by the City Clerk on October 27, 2022. The turnout for the election was 29.17%, the lowest turnout since 1974.

Mayoral Candidate	Vote	%
John Tory (X)	342,158	62.00
Gil Penalosa	98,525	17.85
Chloe Brown	34,821	6.31
Blake Acton	8,893	1.61
Sarah Climenhaga	6,729	1.22
Tony Luk	6,662	1.21
Jack Yan	5,585	1.01
Stephen Punwasi	5,236	0.95
Kevin Clarke	4,333	0.79
Reginald Tull	3,935	0.71
Khadijah Jamal	3,656	0.66
Knia Singh	3,030	0.55
Arjun Gupta	2,843	0.52
Darren Atkinson	2,580	0.47
Sandeep Srivastava	2,024	0.37
Robert Hatton	1,918	0.35
Monowar Hossain	1,840	0.33
Phillip D'Cruze	1,695	0.35
Drew Buckingham	1,679	0.30
Soaad Hossain	1,670	0.30
D!ONNE Renée	1,483	0.27
Kyle Schwartz	1,357	0.25
Kris Langenfeld	1,326	0.24
Elvira Caputolan	1,280	0.23
Isabella Gamk	1,151	0.21
Cory Deville	1,142	0.21
Avraham Arrobas	942	0.17
Ferin Malek	939	0.17
John Letonja	859	0.16
Alexey Efimovskikh	844	0.15
Peter Handjis	755	0.14
