= Chris Sky =

Canadian conspiracy theorist

Christopher Saccoccia
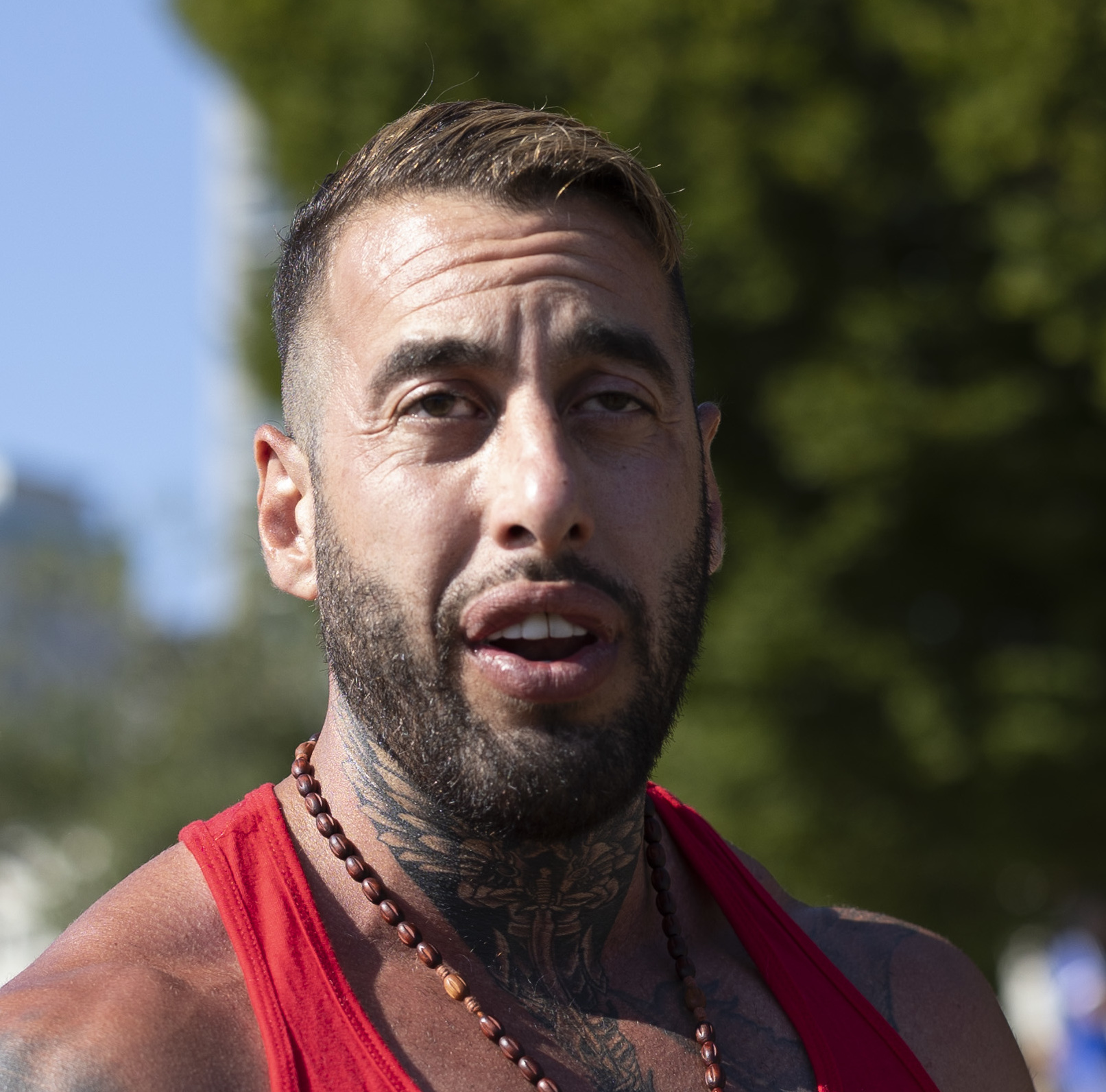
- Chris Sky in Vancouver, July 2021
- Born: Ontario, Canada
- Other name: Chris Sky
- Occupation: Property developer
- Employer: Sky Homes Corp.
- Known for: Anti-mask activist, COVID-19 denial
- Spouse: Jennifer Saccoccia
- Website: https://realchrissky.com/

Christopher Saccoccia, widely referred to as Chris Sky, is a Canadian social media personality known for his involvement in the anti-mask, anti-lockdown, COVID-19 denial and anti-vaccine movements during the COVID-19 pandemic. Saccoccia faces a number of legal issues and criminal charges including for allegations of uttering death threats against Ontario Premier Doug Ford and other public figures and for assault of a police officer, among others. Saccoccia ran for Mayor of Toronto in the 2023 by-election, placing ninth.

== Early life ==
Saccoccia is the son of Vaughan developer, and owner of Sky Homes Corp, Art Saccoccia.

== Career ==
Saccoccia is the Vice President of his father's company, Sky Homes Corp.

== Opposition to COVID-19 public health measures ==
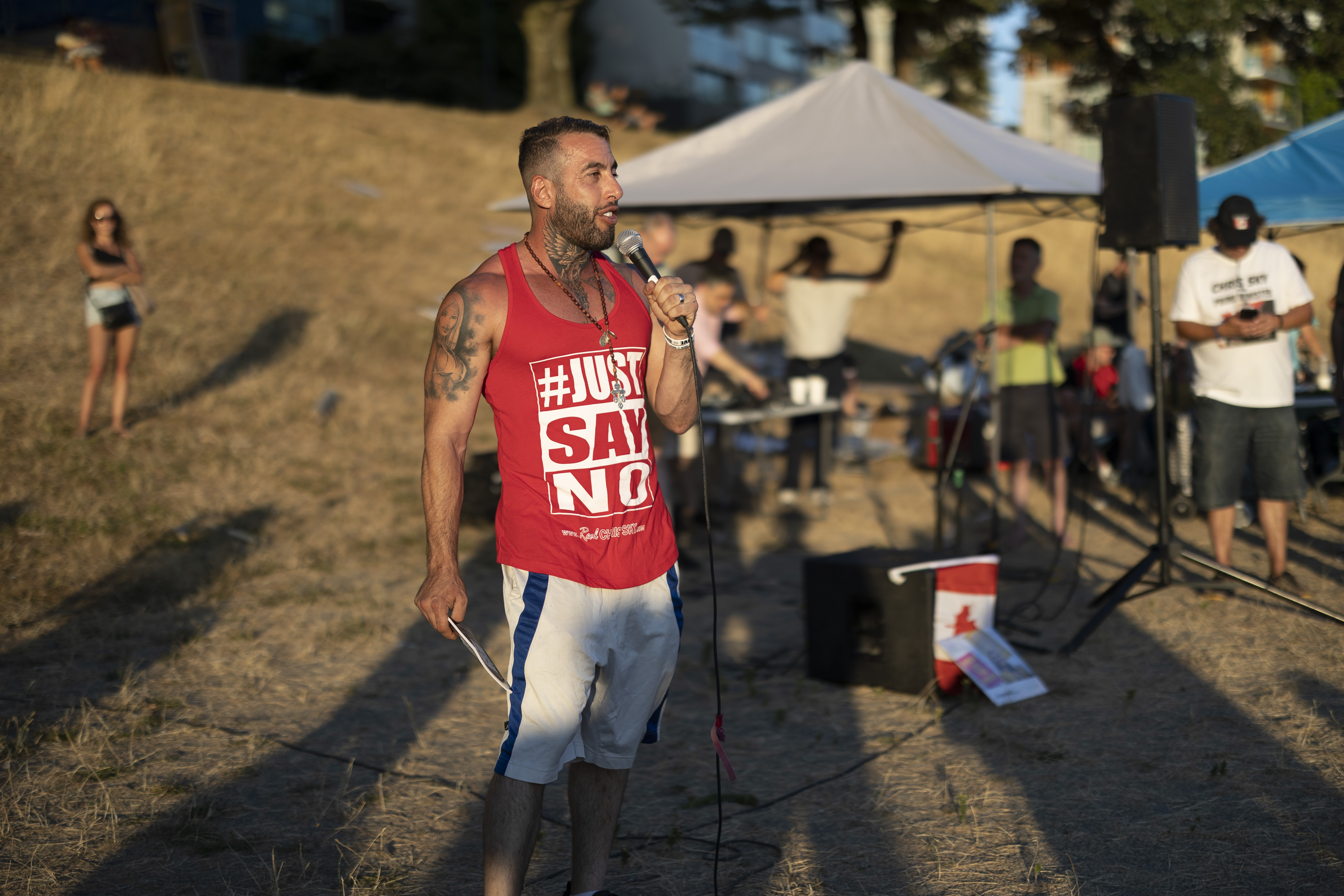
Saccoccia at the Vancouver Freedom Rally, 26 July 2021

Saccoccia believes that public health measures are unconstitutional, and violate human rights. He refers to his group's activities as a "freedom convoy" and attends rallies across Canada, dubbed "freedom rallies", meeting with groups of people at each event, and encourages them to engage in civil disobedience against allegedly tyrannical public health measures, which he calls "united non-compliance."

In 2020, Saccoccia founded a group known as "Mothers Against Distancing" and "Hugs Over Masks" following the outbreak of COVID-19 in Canada, protesting the public health measures introduced by the Ontario government and Toronto Public Health.

During the summer of 2021, Saccoccia joined an Italian online movement against lockdown and COVID's prevention measures called Mattonisti by putting a brick emoji after his Twitter's account name. The movement is allegedly responsible for manipulating Twitter's tendencies by pushing certain movement's slogans as hashtags, although the movement's leader deny that they have an agenda and affirm they are only an online friends group.

=== Opposition to face masks ===
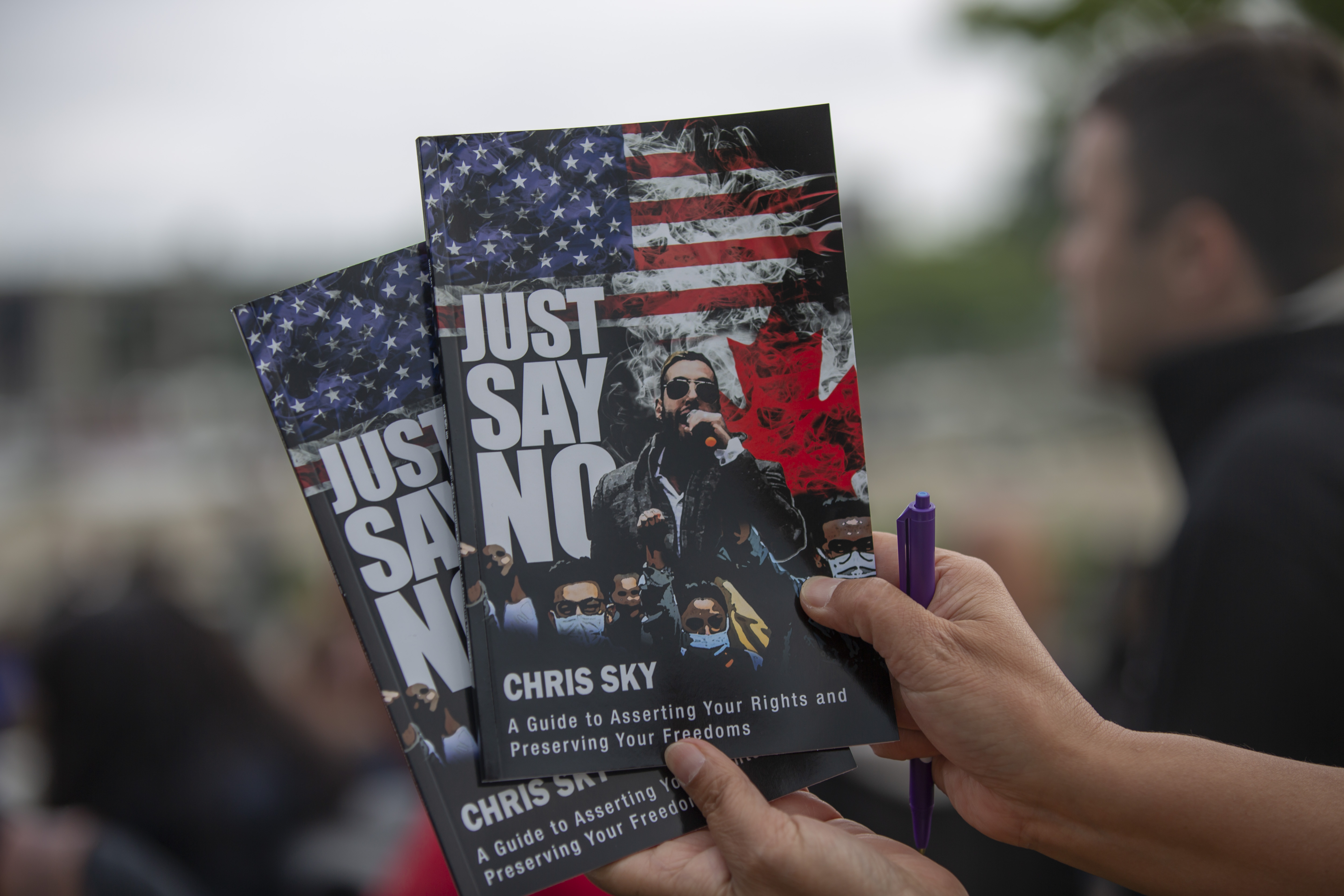
Promotional flyer about Saccoccia

Saccoccia believes that mask regulations such as one introduced by the City of Toronto amount to a violation of human rights. He and his supporters distributed fake mask-exemption cards. In response, the Canadian Human Rights Commission discouraged the use of the fake cards, Ontario premier Doug Ford and Toronto mayor John Tory warned that Saccoccia's group were "scammers", and confirmed the cards were fraudulent.

In July 2020, Saccoccia and 40 activists from his Hugs Over Masks group entered a Toronto Transit Commission (TTC) subway station without masks to protest the introduction of a mask by-law on the TTC, again claiming an exemption.

Soccoccia does not believe the use of face masks is an effective method of preventing the spread of COVID-19. He founded the Mothers Against Distancing group to protest the use of masks at schools, stating the children are "in a constant state of anxiety and fear, so there's no way they'll learn anything".

Saccoccia attempted to start a private school, known as "Private-On-Demand Education Inc." without masks and public health measures, arguing that he can "[protect] and save countless children from the government that is attempting to harm them psychologically and socially condition them for a life of fear and compliance."

The psychotherapist who provided Saccoccia and his wife with mask exemptions, Mary Elizabeth O’Connor, is one of four Ontario doctors under investigation for professional misconduct in relation to the COVID-19 pandemic and her completion of medical exemptions for COVID-19 vaccinations and diagnostic testing by the College of Physicians and Surgeons of Ontario. Saccoccia can be heard stating which doctor gave him the exemption while in a public video he posted to his Telegram account from the day he and his wife were detained by West Edmonton Mall security for failing to obey a no trespass order on Saturday December 4, 2021. The College of Physicians and Surgeons of Ontario suspended Dr O'Connor on 23 December 2021.

=== Vaccines ===
Saccoccia is anti-vaccine and promotes COVID-19 vaccine misinformation and hesitancy. He opposes vaccine mandates and COVID-19 vaccine passports being used during the Canadian COVID-19 vaccine rollout.

== Political views ==
Saccoccia said in late 2020 that he believed that Canadian government was moving toward communism, and that a new political party would be unveiled in the new year. Saccoccia informed followers to attend election rallies in protest against Canadian Prime Minister Justin Trudeau during the 2021 Canadian federal election. In 2021 he supported the Republican Party of Canada.

In 2022, Saccoccia suggested that the 2022 Russian invasion of Ukraine was justified and suggested Ukrainians were open to their Russian invaders. He connected Deputy Prime Minister of Canada Chrystia Freeland with his views on both the Canada convoy protest and the invasion of Ukraine. Saccoccia suggested the 2014 annexation of Crimea was justified as Crimea was always Russian property. He also suggested the Ukraine biolabs conspiracy theory was true and made fun of Volodymyr Zelenskyy's acting career.

After the resignation of Toronto Mayor John Tory, Saccoccia announced he intends to be a candidate for Mayor of Toronto in the 2023 mayoral by-election. He received 1.1 percent of the ballots, finishing ninth, and claimed the election results were fraudulent.

== Arrests ==
Saccoccia, along with his wife and other followers of his loosely organized group have been arrested multiple times over the course of the COVID-19 pandemic in Canada. Saccoccia and his wife were charged under the Quarantine Act on October 6, 2020. The pair had returned from an anti-mask event in Ireland on September 20, 2020, and had been spotted at a Toronto anti-mask event the following week. They were the first people in Toronto to be criminally charged under the act. Saccoccia later travelled to the Maritimes for planned rallies and on October 9, 2020, the Royal Canadian Mounted Police (RCMP) arrested him following a disturbance on his flight into Moncton, New Brunswick. He was scheduled to attend an event in Halifax, Nova Scotia on October 11, however he was escorted back to the airport and took a flight leaving the region.

On January 24, 2021, Saccoccia was charged with being a common nuisance and four counts of public mischief following an anti-mask event in Toronto. At Toronto Pearson Airport on April 6, 2021, Saccoccia discovered he had been placed on the Passenger Protect list (commonly referred to as the Canadian No Fly List) after Flair Airlines declined to allow him onto a flight to attend anti-mask events in Alberta. On April 18, 2021, Saccoccia was then arrested by the Thunder Bay Police Service after an organized gathering. He was charged with breach of undertaking under the Emergency Management and Civil Protection Act, and was released the following Tuesday with a future court date. On April 29, 2021, the province of Manitoba announced it would issue Saccoccia with two $1,296 fines, following his attendance at a rally at The Forks in Winnipeg on April 25.

On May 12, 2021, Saccoccia was alleged to have told fellow anti-mask advocate Rob Carbone that he wished to shoot and kill him and Premier of Ontario Doug Ford along with every premier in Canada. The incident was reported to the Toronto Police Service on May 19, and a police constable attended his residence in King to effect an arrest. Saccoccia entered a car, drove towards the officer and fled. He later turned himself in at Toronto Police 53 Division and was charged with uttering death threats, assaulting a police officer, and dangerous operation of a vehicle.

On August 24, 2021, Saccoccia was arrested in Winnipeg, Manitoba, following a rally at the University of Winnipeg. The Winnipeg Police Service stated that they arrested Saccoccia on a warrant for contravention of the Public Health Act that was issued in May, as he had violated Manitoba's self-isolation requirements for people entering the province, and attended an anti-mask rally that violated restrictions that limited outdoor gatherings to a maximum of ten people. Following his release, his bail hearing was set for October 5, 2021. On September 10, 2021, Saccoccia was arrested in Hamilton, Ontario for breach of undertaking. On September 26, 2021, Saccoccia organized a protest at Yonge-Dundas Square (now Sankofa Square) in Toronto. He encouraged his followers to go to businesses unmasked and unvaccinated. Two other protesters were arrested by Toronto Police following an attempted storming of the Toronto Eaton Centre.

On November 7, 2021, in Calgary, Saccoccia was arrested by the Calgary Police Service and charged with mischief after encouraging his supporters to drive extremely slowly around airports in an attempt to block traffic to arrivals areas. On November 18, 2021, Saccoccia was arrested by West Edmonton Mall security for trespassing.

On December 4, 2021, Saccoccia, dressed as Santa Claus, was arrested in Edmonton at a Build-A-Bear Workshop in West Edmonton Mall during a protest. He was arrested on outstanding warrants including uttering threats and public mischief along with his wife regarding an injunction banning both from the mall. A third individual, Zeeshan Ahmed (self proclaimed Dr. Zee) was also arrested for breaching the injunction.

On June 13, 2023, after turning himself in at the Toronto Police Service's 53 division, Saccoccia was arrested for uttering death threats to cause death or bodily harm. Before his arrest, Saccoccia posted on Twitter, blaming the “deep state” conspiracy as the reason behind his decision to surrender to police. He claimed it would be the 27th time he had been arrested and his 73rd criminal charge.

== Controversies ==
According to screenshots posted in a piece on Saccoccia by the Canadian Anti-Hate Network, he has engaged online in rhetoric regarding Holocaust denial and antisemitism, anti-black racism, Islamophobia, homophobia and transphobia.

In April 2021, Saccoccia was removed from Instagram for violating community standards. A spokesperson for Facebook (Instagram's parent company) said: "We will not tolerate content on our platform about COVID-19 that could lead to harm, including harmful vaccine misinformation and content promoting widely debunked hoaxes." In December 2021, Saccoccia was suspended from Twitter for breaching the site's community standards. He has also been suspended from TikTok and Facebook.

Following his arrest in Thunder Bay, Saccocia and his associates demanded free food at a restaurant in Sault Ste. Marie. When the owner declined, the group began to leave negative online reviews at the business. The Forks Market in Winnipeg closed its doors on April 25, 2021, in response to safety concerns caused by Saccocia's group during a rally. A pharmacy in Maple Creek, Saskatchewan, also closed the previous day as a result of the group moving through the town.

In London, Ontario in October 2021, Saccoccia organized a rally that surpassed more than 1,000 people in attendance. Local businesses were advised to close, with some saying that staff had been harassed during a previous Saccocia rally in the district.

== Personal life ==
Saccoccia lives in King, Ontario, in the Region of York with his wife, Jennifer Saccoccia.

== See also ==
- Vaccine hesitancy
- Face masks during the COVID-19 pandemic
- COVID-19 misinformation in Canada
