= Rent bank =

A rent bank is a predominantly Canadian service that provides interest-free loans to low-income households who have regular income but face eviction as a result of a short-term financial crisis. Rent banks are a homelessness prevention strategy. By providing tenants with an upfront loan that can be used to pay for rent, utilities, or other unexpected cost tenants, housing stability is guaranteed and evictions are reduced. Loan repayment rate is roughly 67%, with loans usually a little under $1000.

== Examples of rent banks ==
=== City of Toronto ===
The Toronto Rent Bank provides up to two-months of rent for tenants facing eviction due to unpaid rent or seeking to move into more suitable housing. The program is funded directly by the City of Toronto and administered by the non-profit Neighbourhood Information Post

=== British Columbia ===
The BC Rent Bank is funded by the Province of British Columbia, and managed by Vancity Community Foundation province-wide. Various non-profits directly administer funds and provide loans direct to tenants.

=== Manitoba ===
On March 29, 2021, the Government of Manitoba announced a $5.6 million-dollar rent bank. The goal of the program is to support stable housing for low-income to moderate-income families.

The rent bank will be administered by the Manitoba Non-Profit Housing Association with funds distributed by local rent banks.

The program will be piloted for two years then reevaluated.
