= Josh Matlow =

Canadian municipal politician (born 1975)

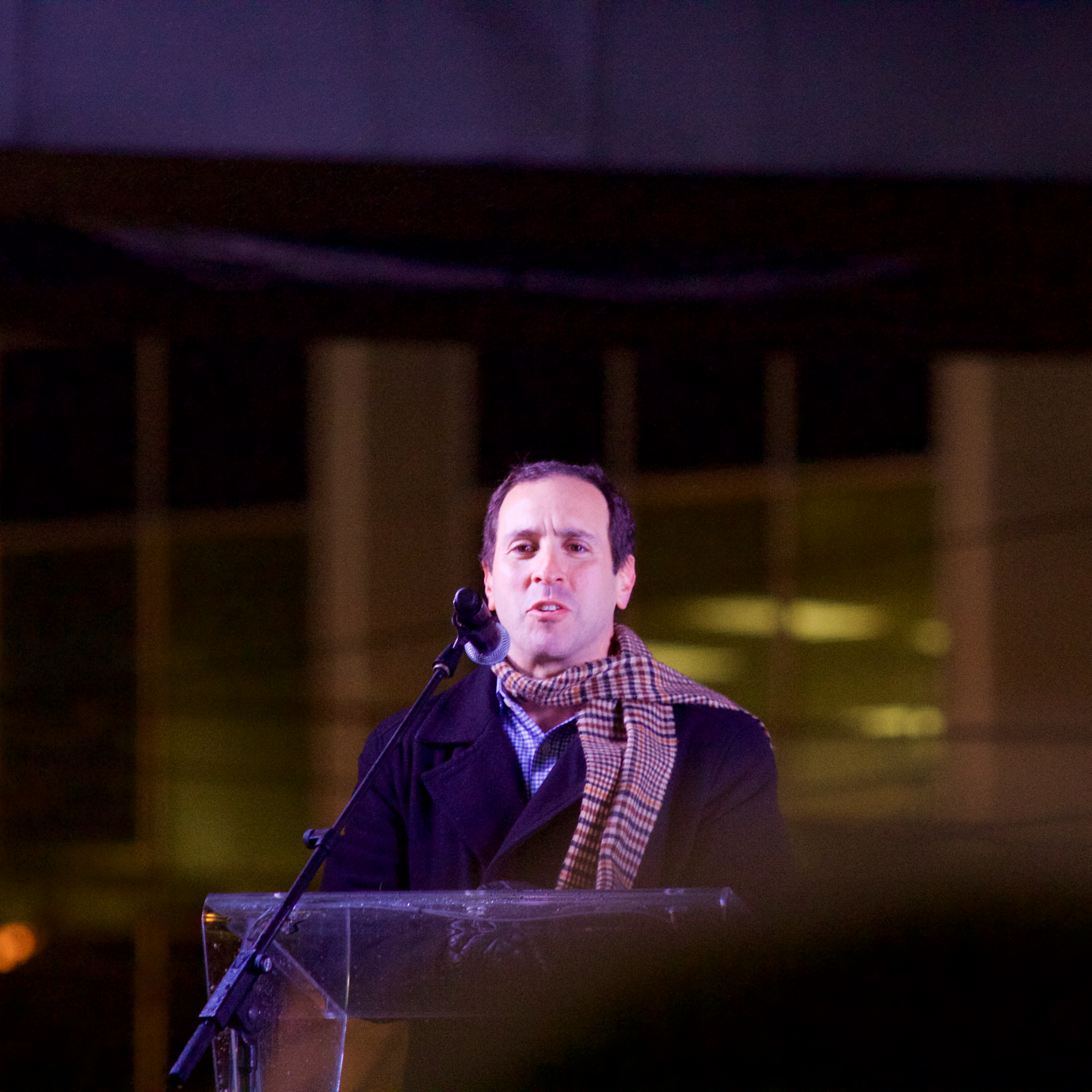
- Matlow in 2018

Toronto City Councillor for Ward 12 Toronto—St. Paul's (Note: The current Ward 12 Toronto—St. Paul's was created when Ward 21 St. Paul's and Ward 22 St. Paul's were amalgamated in 2018. Matlow represented Ward 22 St. Paul's from 2010 to 2018.)
- Incumbent
- Assumed office December 1, 2010
- Preceded by: Michael Walker

Toronto District School Board Trustee for St. Paul’s
- In office December 1, 2003 – November 30, 2010
- Preceded by: Shelley Laskin
- Succeeded by: Shelley Laskin

Personal details
- Born: November 27, 1975 (age 50) Toronto, Ontario, Canada
- Party: Independent
- Other political affiliations: Ontario Liberal (2002)
- Spouse: Melissa Christine Matlow
- Education: Concordia University
- Occupation: Journalist; environmental advocate; politician
- Website: Constituency website Campaign website

Josh Matlow (born November 27, 1975) is a Canadian politician who has represented Ward 12 Toronto—St. Paul's on Toronto City Council since 2010.

Matlow ran as the Ontario Liberal Party candidate in the 2002 Dufferin—Peel—Wellington—Grey by-election, losing against Progressive Conservative Premier Ernie Eves. Matlow was a Toronto District School Board (TDSB) trustee between 2003 and 2010 before his election to council representing St. Paul's. He was elected to City Council following the 2010 municipal election, and was re-elected in 2014, 2018, 2022, and 2026. Matlow ran for mayor of Toronto in the 2023 by-election.

== Early life and education ==
Matlow was born in Toronto, Ontario. His father, Ted Matlow, was a federally appointed judge and his mother, Elaine Mitchell, was a retired high school teacher. He studied political science at Concordia University and attended L'École Internationale de Théâtre Jacques Lecoq in Paris, France.

== Career ==
Before entering politics, Matlow was an actor. He performed in festivals, did comedy improv and television commercials.

Matlow was a co-director of Earthroots, an Ontario environmental non-governmental organization. He also worked for the Canadian Peace Alliance, organizing against the war in Iraq.

Matlow has written articles for several local newspapers including the Toronto Sun and Toronto Star. He hosted a call-in radio show on University of Toronto station CIUT, was a weekly contributor and co-host on Toronto talk-radio station AM 640 and CFRB. He hosted a talk radio show called The City with Josh Matlow on Toronto radio station Newstalk 1010 and was a weekly columnist for the Toronto Star.

== Political career ==
In 2002, at the age of 26, Matlow was asked by the Ontario Liberal Party to run as their candidate in Dufferin—Peel—Wellington—Grey in a by-election against Progressive Conservative Premier Ernie Eves. He lost by 3,560 votes.

=== TDSB Trustee (2003—2010) ===
In 2003, Matlow was elected to the Toronto District School Board as a trustee and re-elected to the same position in 2006. He worked on a number of initiatives including installation of solar panels on school rooftops, keeping school pools open, and helping students to achieve 'economic literacy'.

In 2008, Matlow spoke out against a proposal to create an Africentric school in Toronto. He instead favoured the widespread implementation of a more 'culturally diverse' curriculum.

=== Toronto City Councillor ===
==== Elections ====
Matlow was first elected during the 2010 Toronto municipal election as the councillor for Ward 22 St. Paul's. In an interview with the Toronto Star following the election, he identified fostering a sense of community as a priority for his ward. He criticized the city's public consultation process, and committed to holding town hall meetings with residents.

He was re-elected in the 2014 election with the highest vote count (24,347) and highest winning percentage (86.2%) of any councillor candidate across the city. In 2018, Matlow was re-elected in the newly formed Ward 12 Toronto—St. Paul's, beating fellow councillor Joe Mihevc, who represented Ward 21 St. Paul's before his ward and Matlow's were amalgamated. He was re-elected in the 2022 election.

Matlow has been endorsed by the Toronto Star editorial board in the 2010, 2014, 2018, and 2022 elections.

==== Political stance ====
Matlow initially positioned himself as a political centrist during his first term.

In a 2011 interview with BlogTO, he proposed contracting out garbage collection services and allowing unions to compete in the tender, citing frustrations during the 2010 strike. He also supported asking the province to declare transit an essential service, which would prohibit workers from striking. Matlow supported the repeal of a vehicle registration tax, calling for a reevaluation of financing relations with the province. He also expressed his dislike of the land transfer tax, however, did not support a repeal as it would leave a large revenue gap in the city budget.

Later in his career, Matlow shifted to the left, describing himself as a "pragmatic progressive" in 2023. He has supported issues such as a judicial inquiry of encampment clearings, reducing the police budget, and increasing property taxes to offset a transit fare increase.

==== Scarborough transit extension ====
In his first term, Matlow supported the light rail transit (LRT) proposal over Mayor Rob Ford's proposal to construct a shorter extension of Line 2 Bloor–Danforth to replace the aging Line 3 Scarborough. He refers to the LRT as the "evidence-based" transit option, arguing that it serves more people within walking distance and would have been fully funded, instead of requiring the city to take on additional expenses for a subway extension. In 2013, city council ultimately decided to proceed with the subway extension.

In February 2015, Matlow raised a number of administrative inquiries relating to ridership, the cost of cancelling the LRT project, as well as proceeding with a subway extension. The city manager's response confirmed that city staff did not know how many people will ride the Scarborough subway, where it will go, or how much it will cost. In 2018, Matlow called for a judicial inquiry to investigate what he described as "dysfunctional" transit planning, citing lack of information and misinformation that was provided to council.

==== COVID-19 ====
At the beginning of the COVID-19 pandemic, Matlow became the first known Canadian politician to go into quarantine on March 9, 2020, after coming into close contact with a person who had tested positive for COVID-19.

==== Toronto Police Service funding cut ====
In 2020, Matlow, along with Councillor Kristyn Wong-Tam put forward a motion in Toronto City Council to reduce the Toronto Police Service (TPS) budget by 10 percent ($122 million), reinvest the police budget into community programs, and allow city council to read the line by line police budget they vote on. The motion was defeated.

=== Controversies ===
==== Integrity Commissioner rulings ====
In 2017, the integrity commissioner ruled that Matlow breached the council code of conduct by making claims on a radio show that a city staff member had misled council in 2016. City Manager Peter Wallace asked Matlow to apologize after hearing the interview, which he subsequently did. Following the commissioner's report, Matlow said he was "clearly wrong in pointing at a specific name", but "firmly stand by the concerns" he raised.

In 2018, TTC CEO Andy Byford submitted a complaint to the integrity commissioner, who later ruled that ruled that Matlow again breached the code of conduct when he made comments on a radio show questioning the objectivity of staff's advice.

In 2023, the integrity commissioner ruled that Matlow breached the code of conduct in two separate instances. In the first complaint, he claimed in a tweet that staff had "lied" to him about the opening date of park bathrooms.

The second complaint was filed by Interim City Manager Tracey Cook, who Matlow claimed made a "decisions to omit facts". The commissioner recommended that council dock 10 days of pay from Matlow due to “an escalation” of his misconduct and his history of breaching the code of conduct.

=== 2023 mayoral by-election ===
Matlow announced on March 21, 2023, his intention to run for mayor of Toronto in the 2023 by-election. He lost to Olivia Chow on June 26, finishing in 5th place with 35,572 votes (4.91%).

In an interview with the Toronto Star, Matlow described his approach as "pragmatic progressive", and committed to improving city finances and services through cost savings and a property tax increase. He noted a city report which identified a $46.5 billion in budget pressures over the next decade, promising to take meaningful action to address it.

He proposed increasing property taxes and introducing a two per cent annual "city works fund" charge. The new fund would generate $78 million per year to be directed towards service and infrastructure improvements, costing the average household an additional $67 a year.

Matlow would pause plans to rename Dundas Street. He has also said he intends to ask council to re-evaluate the plan to rebuild the eastern portion of the Gardiner Expressway, stopping its rehabilitation and replacing it with a less expensive boulevard option. He criticized former deputy mayor Ana Bailão's plan to ask the province to take over the highway, describing it as "unrealistic".

Matlow proposed establishing a $115 million community health and safety fund, which would be spent on programs to combat the root causes of crime, such as through mental health supports. The program would be financed by diverting funding increases to the $1.16 billion police budget for three years. The Auditor General's Office and Toronto Police Services Board would support TPS in finding budgetary efficiencies.

== Election results ==
=== Municipal ===
2026 Toronto municipal election, Ward 12 Toronto—St. Paul's
Candidate	Vote	%	minus
Josh Matlow (X)	32,781	67.56	17.09 ▼
Jenny Kalimbet	9,187	18.93	–
David Cottrell	2,228	4.59	–
Mina Nadimi	1,506	3.10	–
Ahmed Kamal	1,421	2.93	–
Bob Murphy	1,400	2.89	1.50 ▼

2023 Toronto mayoral by-election
Candidate	Votes	Vote share
Olivia Chow	269,372	37.17%
Ana Bailão	235,175	32.45%
Mark Saunders	62,167	8.58%
Anthony Furey	35,899	4.95%
Josh Matlow	35,572	4.91%
Mitzie Hunter	21,229	2.93%
Source: City of Toronto

2022 Toronto Municipal Election, Ward 12 Toronto—St. Paul's
Candidate	Votes	Vote share
Josh Matlow	22,670	84.7%
Bryan Ashworth	2,045	7.6%
Bob Murphy	1,175	4.4%
Antonio Corpuz	892	3.3%
Total	26,782	100%
Source: City of Toronto

2018 Toronto municipal election, Ward 12 Toronto—St. Paul's
Candidate	Votes	Vote share
Josh Matlow	20,371	51.60%
Joe Mihevc	16,634	42.14%
Ian Lipton	930	2.36%
Elizabeth Cook	908	2.3%
Bob Murphy	342	0.87%
Artur Langu	290	0.73%
Total	39,475	100%
Source: City of Toronto

2010 Toronto municipal election, Ward 22 St. Paul's
Candidate	Votes	Vote share
Josh Matlow	11,892	52.39%
Chris Sellors	8,037	35.40%
Elizabeth Cook	1,900	8.37%
William Molls	869	3.82%
Total	22,698	100%
Source: City of Toronto

=== Provincial ===
2002 by-election for riding of Dufferin—Peel—Wellington—Grey
Party	Candidate	Votes	%	±%
Progressive Conservative	Ernie Eves	15,288	46.59	-
Liberal	Josh Matlow	11,728	35.74	-
New Democratic	Doug Wilcox	2,633	8.02	-
Green	Richard Procter	2,017	6.15	
Family Coalition	Dave Davies	1,025	3.12	-
Independent	John Turmel	120	0.37	
