= Ward 12 Toronto—St. Paul's =

Municipal council district in Toronto, Ontario, Canada

- Constituency for the Toronto City Council
- Location of Ward 12 in Toronto
- City: Toronto
- Population: 107,900 (2016)

Current constituency
- Created: 2018
- Councillor: Josh Matlow
- Community council: Toronto/East York
- Created from: Ward 21; Ward 22; Ward 15 (partial)
- First contested: 2018 election
- Last contested: 2026 election
- Ward profile: www.toronto.ca/ward-12-toronto-st-pauls/

Ward 12 Toronto—St. Paul's is a municipal electoral division in Toronto, Ontario, Canada that has been represented in the Toronto City Council since the 2018 municipal election. It was last contested in 2026, with Josh Matlow being elected councillor.

== Boundaries ==
On August 14, 2018, the Government of Ontario redrew municipal boundaries via the Better Local Government Act, 2018, S.O. 2018, c. 11 - Bill 5. This means that the 25 provincial electoral districts and the 25 municipal wards in Toronto currently share the same geographic borders.

Defined in legislation as:

Consisting of that part of the City of Toronto described as follows: commencing at the intersection of Eglinton Avenue West and Dufferin Street; thence southerly along Dufferin Street to Rogers Road; thence easterly along said road to Oakwood Avenue; thence southerly along said avenue to Holland Park Avenue; thence easterly along said avenue to Winona Drive; thence generally southerly along said drive to Davenport Road; thence westerly along said road to Ossington Avenue; thence southerly along said avenue to the Canadian Pacific Railway; thence generally easterly along said railway to Yonge Street; thence northerly along said street to Jackes Avenue; thence easterly along said avenue to the westerly boundary of the Rosehill Reservoir; thence northerly along said boundary to Rosehill Avenue; thence easterly along said avenue and its easterly production to the Don River Tributary situated easterly of Avoca Avenue; thence generally northwesterly along said tributary and its northwesterly production to the southerly boundary of the Mount Pleasant Cemetery; thence generally easterly along said boundary to Mount Pleasant Road; thence northerly along said road to Broadway Avenue; thence westerly along said avenue to Yonge Street; thence southerly along said street to Eglinton Avenue West; thence westerly along said avenue to the point of commencement.

== History ==
=== 2018 boundary adjustment ===
Toronto municipal ward boundaries were significantly modified in 2018 during the election campaign. Ultimately the new ward structure was used and later upheld by the Supreme Court of Canada in 2021.

=== 2018 municipal election ===
Ward 12 was first contested during the 2018 municipal election with six candidates, including Ward 21 incumbent Joe Mihevc and Ward 22 incumbent Josh Matlow. Matlow was ultimately elected with 51.60 per cent of the vote, beating Mihevc, who received 42.14 per cent.

== Geography ==
Ward 12 is part of the Toronto and East York community council.

Toronto—St. Paul's approximate boundaries are Winona Drive, Rogers Road and Dufferin Street on the west, and Eglinton Avenue, Yonge Street and Broadway Avenue on the north. On the east, its boundaries are Mount Pleasant Road, the Mount Pleasant Cemetery and Yonge Street, and the Canadian Pacific (CP) Railway line on the south side.

The ward consists of part of the Fairbank, Humewood-Cedarvale, Hillcrest-Bracondale, Wychwood Park, part of Davenport, Casa Loma, Forest Hill, Tarragon Village, Rathnelly, South Hill, Summerhill, Rosehill, Chaplin Estates, Deer Park and Davisville and part of North Toronto neighbourhoods.

== Councillors ==
Council term	Member	
Council term	Ward 21 St. Paul's	Ward 22 St. Paul's
2000–2003	Joe Mihevc	Michael Walker
2003–2006	Joe Mihevc	Michael Walker
2006–2010	Joe Mihevc	Michael Walker
2010–2014	Joe Mihevc	Josh Matlow
2014–2018	Joe Mihevc	Josh Matlow
	Ward 12 Toronto—St. Paul's	
2018–2022	Josh Matlow	
2022–2026	Josh Matlow	
2026–2030	Josh Matlow	

== Election results ==
=== 2026 Toronto municipal election ===
Candidate	Vote	%
Josh Matlow (X)	32,781	67.56
Jenny Kalimbet	9,187	18.93
David Cottrell	2,228	4.59
Mina Nadimi	1,506	3.10
Ahmed Kamal	1,421	2.93
Bob Murphy	1,400	2.89

=== 2022 Toronto municipal election ===
Candidate	Vote	%
Josh Matlow (X)	22,670	84.65
Bryan Ashworth	2,045	7.64
Bob Murphy	1,175	4.39
Antonio Courpuz	892	3.33

=== 2018 Toronto municipal election ===
Candidate	Votes	Vote share
Josh Matlow	20,371	51.60%
Joe Mihevc	16,634	42.14%
Ian Lipton	930	2.36%
Elizabeth Cook	908	2.3%
Bob Murphy	342	0.87%
Artur Langu	290	0.73%
Total	39,475	100%
Source: City of Toronto

== See also ==
- Municipal elections in Canada
- Municipal government of Toronto
- List of Toronto municipal elections
