= Psychosocial distress =

Medical condition

Psychosocial distress refers to the unpleasant emotions or psychological symptoms an individual has when they are overwhelmed, which negatively impacts their quality of life. Psychosocial distress is most commonly used in medical care to refer to the emotional distress experienced by populations of patients and caregivers of patients with complex chronic conditions such as cancer, diabetes, and cardiovascular conditions, which confer heavy symptom burdens that are often overwhelming, due to the disease's association with death. Due to the significant history of psychosocial distress in cancer treatment, and a lack of reliable secondary resources documenting distress in other contexts, psychosocial distress will be mainly discussed in the context of oncology.

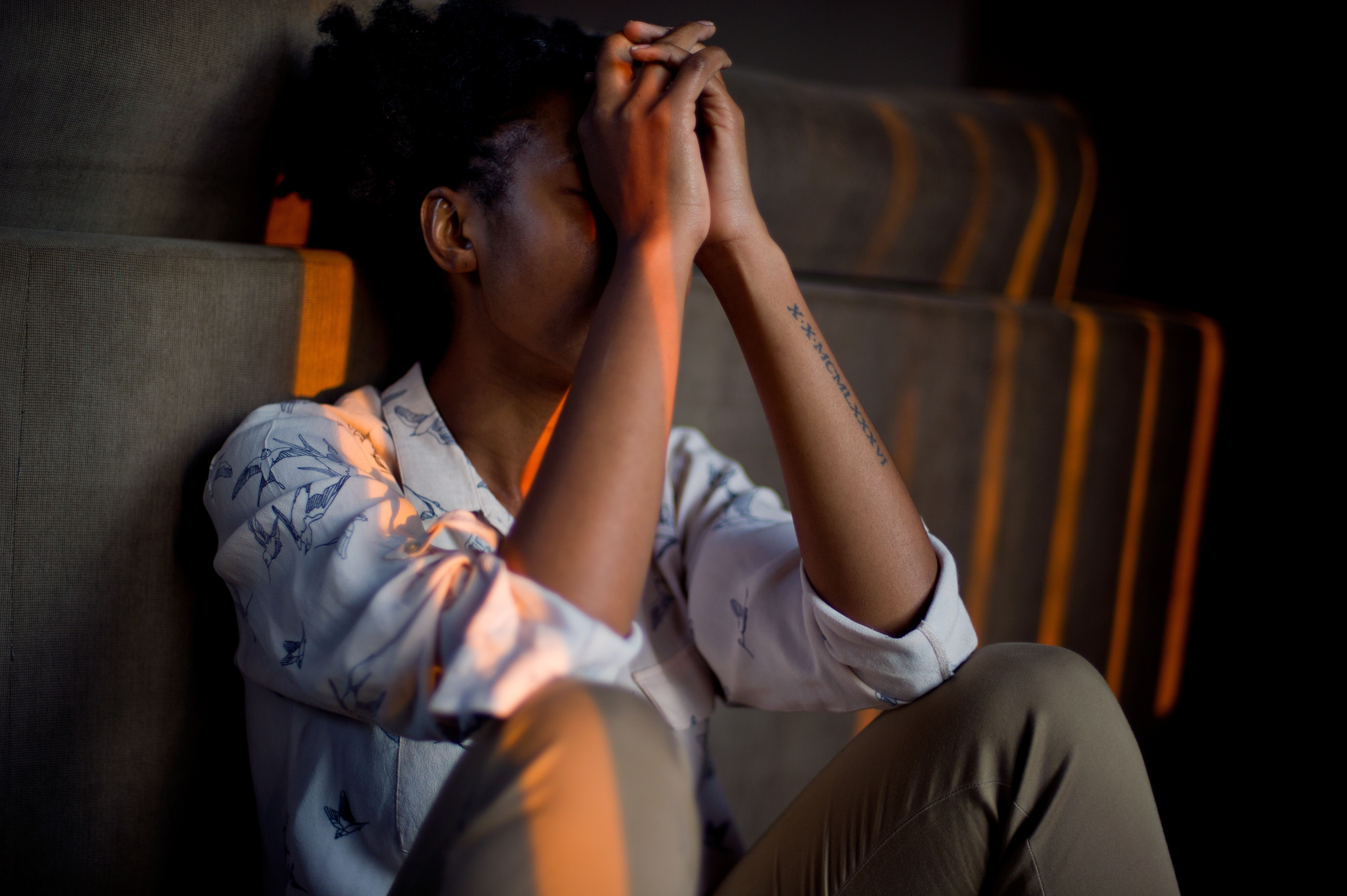
Photo of a woman suffering from stress and emotional distress.

Although the terms "psychological" and "psychosocial" are frequently used interchangeably, their definitions are different. While "psychological" refers to an individual's mental and emotional state, "psychosocial" refers to how one's ideas, feelings, and behaviors influence and are influenced by social circumstances. While psychological distress refers to the influence of internal processes on psychological wellbeing, psychosocial factors additionally include external, social, and interpersonal influences. Psychosocial distress is commonly caused by clinically related trauma, personal life changes, and extraneous stressors, which negatively influences the patient's mood, cognition, and interpersonal activity, eroding the patient's wellbeing and quality of life. Symptoms manifest as psychological disorders, decreased ability to work and communicate, and a range of health issues related to stress and metabolism. Distress management aims to improve the disease symptoms and wellbeing of patients, it involves the screening and triage of patients to optimal treatments and careful outcome monitoring.

However, stigmatization of psychosocial distress is present in various sectors of society and cultures, causing many patients to avoid diagnosis and treatment, in which further action is required to ensure their safety. As an increasingly relevant field in medical care, further research is required for the development of better treatments for psychosocial distress, with relation to diverse demographics and advances in digital platforms.

== Causes and symptoms ==
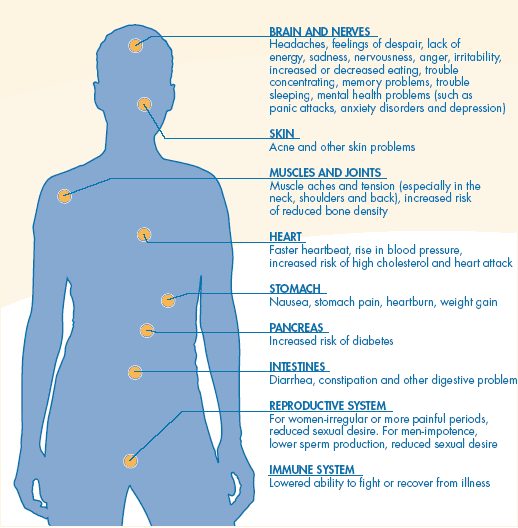
Diagram illustrating the comprehensive effects of stress on bodily functions.

Common causes of psychosocial distress include clinically related trauma, personal life changes, and extraneous stressors. The unsettling sensations experienced can cause individuals to respond to the stress in different ways, presenting psychological symptoms (e.g., excessive exhaustion, unhappiness, avoidance, dread and worry) that negative impacts an individual's well-being and quality of life. When in psychosocial anguish, an individual may appear detached and avoid interpersonal communication. In addition, the ability to perform up to standard in the workplace can be impacted due to psychosocial discomfort. For example, the patient may find it difficult to stay focused or manage responsibilities sustainably.

Clinical presentations of health issues may be observed, particularly for heart function. As a result of the body's increased release of stress hormones (e.g., cortisol) due to prolonged stress, blood pressure and heart rate will jump significantly. Such histological responses are linked to an increase in:

- bodily inflammation
- risk of stroke
- cancer progression
- cardiovascular disease
- insomnia
- injury and suicidal tendencies

These clinical health issues often further exacerbate the original psychological symptoms. Furthermore, digestion, metabolism and other crucial bodily functions may be slowed down.

== Screening and diagnosis ==
Prior to 2014, the implementation of evidence-based distress screening in the healthcare setting was scarce. In 2014, to increase objectivity in distress screening based on qualitative data, the American Psychosocial Oncology Society (APOS) and Yale School of Nursing (YSN) collaborated to publish the Screening for Psychosocial Distress program, outlining the five steps – Screen, Evaluation, Referral, Follow-up and Documentation/Quality Improvement – to be carried out in psychosocial distress screening.

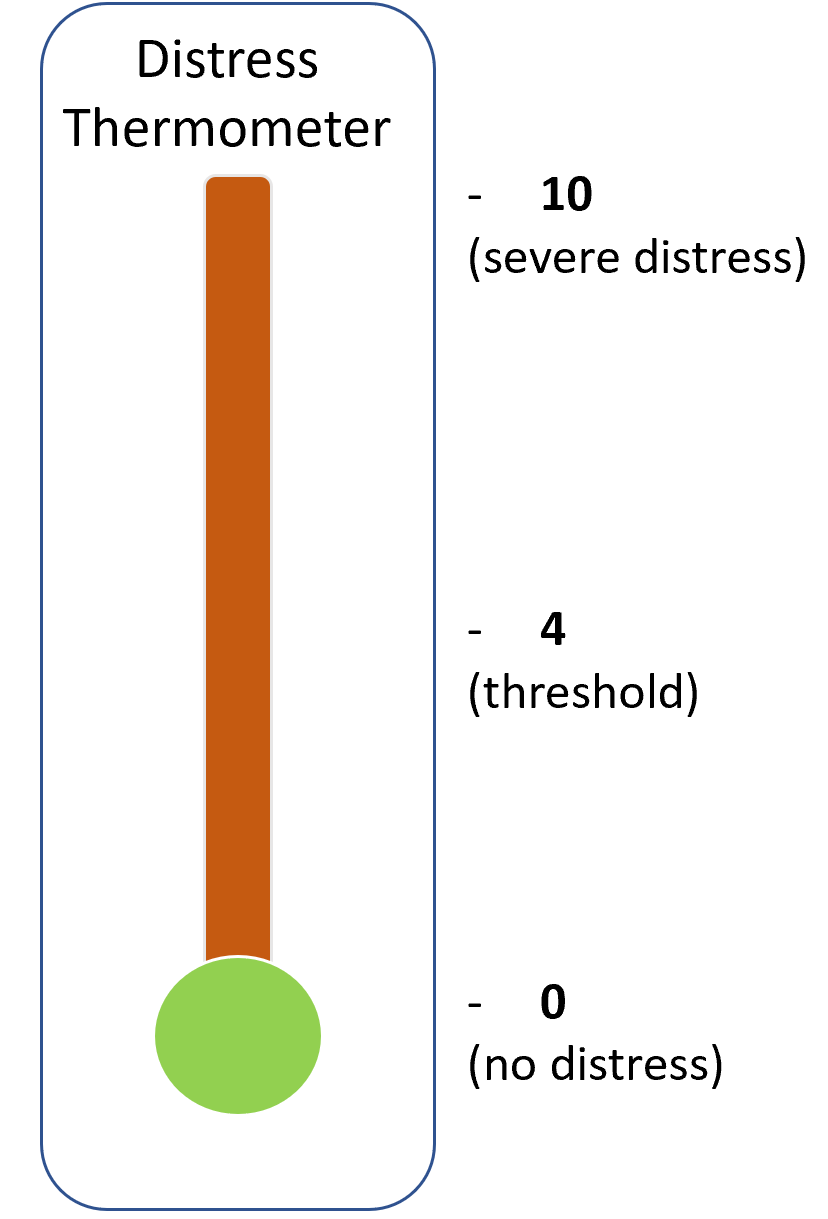
Diagram illustrating the Distress Thermometer (DT).

=== Screening ===
The Distress Thermometer (DT) is an established self-assessment tool that invites patients to score their perceived level of distress during the previous week on a scale from 0 (no distress) to 10 (severe, intolerable distress). 39 different prompts classified as "practical", "family", "emotional", "spiritual", and "physical" categories are utilized to evaluate the wellbeing of patients experiencing psychosocial distress. An average rating of >=4 points is regarded as significant, necessitating additional medical evaluation to determine the best course of medical care.

=== Evaluation ===
The recommended practice is to periodically assess ongoing and recovered cancer patients for anxiety and depressive symptoms during the course of their care, according to the Pan-Canadian Screening, Assessment and Care guideline that is sponsored by the American Society of Clinical Oncology (ASCO). The Generalized Anxiety Disorder Scale can be used to evaluate symptoms of anxiety: a score of 0-4 implicates no symptoms, 5-9 implicates clement symptoms, 10-13 implicates moderate symptoms and 15-21 implicates severe symptoms.

=== Referral ===
With reference to cancer patients in particular, in the event that typical management and treatment does not improve psychosocial distress outcomes, medical care professionals should provide patients with targeted referrals to mental health and social work institutions.

=== Follow-up ===
Providing patients with follow up information, discussion and communication with their healthcare providers enables for further reevaluation upon the course of management or treatment that will be followed. Such communication also allows the provision of detailed patient-specific care.

=== Documentation and quality improvement ===
All distress related patient information should be recorded in detail to reliably evaluate the course of the further action, according to the APOS Guidelines.

== Distress management ==
Psychosocial distress management (DM) is mandatory in oncology care for every phase of disease treatment, and it involves screening, assessment, triage, intervention and outcome monitoring. Each stage is personalized based on individual factors of age, race/ethnicity, sex, LGBTQ+, socio-economic status, physical/cognitive limitations, literacy, mental health/substance abuse history, as recommended by the APOS and Association of Oncology Social Work's (AOSW) 2021 consensus panel.

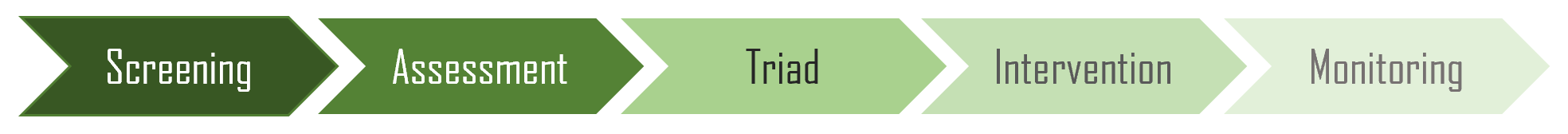
Diagram illustrating the 5 steps of psychosocial distress management.

Patients and their caregivers are proactively screened for distress at regular intervals and (optimally) every medical visit, as early detection is essential for avoidance of severe distress symptoms. Frequency of screening increases with the stage of the disease, as the risk of distress increases with severity of disease symptoms. Positively assessed patients are triaged to optimal interventions, while their clinical contacts and referrals are tracked by the health institution to ensure treatment is received. These targeted referrals are made towards optimal evidence-based treatments based on the patient's specific psychosocial symptoms and individual factors, with adherence to the NCCN's 2020 guidelines.

=== Treatment and intervention ===
The goal of DM is to relieve mental distress, raise the wellbeing of patients, and improve cancer treatment outcomes. Evidence-based interventions are classified into 1st-line interventions and 2nd-line interventions, whose effectiveness vary depending on the patient's individual characteristics and symptoms.

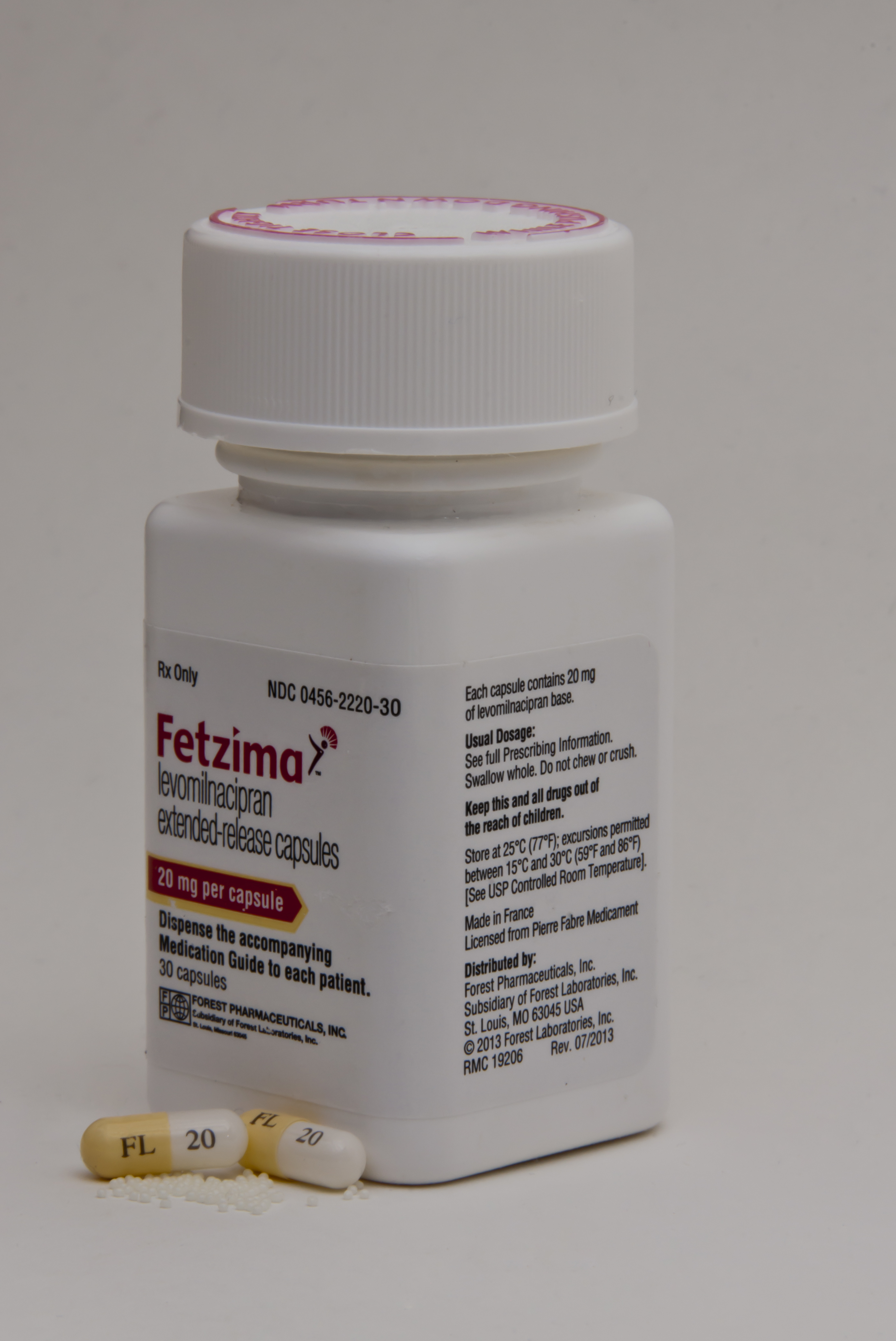
Fetizma- a serotonin and norepinephrine reuptake inhibitor antidepressant (SNRI) for treatment of psychosocial depression symptoms.

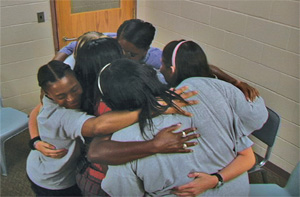
Group hug at a patients group therapy.

Table of common evidence-based interventions
Type of Intervention	Interventions/Treatments	Examples
1st-line Interventions (For moderate to severe distress)	Psychosocial interventions (emotional/cognitive-based)	Cognitive behavioral therapy (CBT)
1st-line Interventions (For moderate to severe distress)	Psychosocial interventions (emotional/cognitive-based)	Acceptance and commitment therapy (ACT)
1st-line Interventions (For moderate to severe distress)	Psychosocial interventions (emotional/cognitive-based)	Mindfulness-based stress reduction (MBSR)
1st-line Interventions (For moderate to severe distress)	Medication	Antidepressants, opioid analgesics
1st-line Interventions (For moderate to severe distress)	Medication	NSAIDs
1st-line Interventions (For moderate to severe distress)	Psychoeducation	Stress and self-management training
1st-line Interventions (For moderate to severe distress)	Rehabilitation	Physical therapy
1st-line Interventions (For moderate to severe distress)	Rehabilitation	Speech therapy
1st-line Interventions (For moderate to severe distress)	Rehabilitation	Occupational therapy
1st-line Interventions (For moderate to severe distress)	Exercise Interventions	Yoga
1st-line Interventions (For moderate to severe distress)	Exercise Interventions	Aerobic exercise
1st-line Interventions (For moderate to severe distress)	Exercise Interventions	Tai Chi
2nd-line Interventions (For chronic distress in advanced disease)	Group therapy	Meaning-centered group psychotherapy
2nd-line Interventions (For chronic distress in advanced disease)	Digital health interventions	eHealth self-management programs
2nd-line Interventions (For chronic distress in advanced disease)	Digital health interventions	Mobile applications
2nd-line Interventions (For chronic distress in advanced disease)	Return-to-work interventions	/
2nd-line Interventions (For chronic distress in advanced disease)	Other interventions	Music intervention
2nd-line Interventions (For chronic distress in advanced disease)	Other interventions	Systematic light therapy
2nd-line Interventions (For chronic distress in advanced disease)	Other interventions	Massage therapy

These interventions are often administered in combination, in which nonpharmacological psychosocial interventions are recommended over antidepressant medication due to its higher risk-benefit ratio. Development for the use of digital platforms (such as mobile applications, internet-based, virtual reality) in DM is still in its early stages. Outcome monitoring should be conducted to ensure treatment success.

== Society and culture ==
=== Stigma of distress ===
A video in which clinical health psychologist Dr. Lynne Padgett and cancer survivor Reverend Dr. James Brewer-Calvert discuss the social stigma against mental illnesses.

Stigmatization of mental distress and illnesses is prevalent across many sectors of society. This stigma is driven by presumptions that the patient suffering is to blame for their mental disorder, the socioeconomic disadvantages brought by mental illness (e.g., insurance, hiring discrimination), and by health professionals reluctant to diagnose mental disorders due to such stigmatization, leading to a low level of development in psychiatric research and a low level of confidence in professional treatment effectiveness.

Some cultures (e.g., rural) promote independence and self-affirmation that deter patients from reporting symptoms and receiving treatment. Instead, alternatives such as religion and cognitive reframing (using prayers and narrative construction to encourage self-acceptance) are common coping mechanisms against distress. Hence, in cases where patients decline psychosocial support, educational materials should be provided, accessibility improved via advertising, and comprehensive care integrated in the normal disease treatment.

== History of psychosocial distress in oncology ==
In the 1990s, under recognition, medical coverage, and treatment of psychosocial symptoms stemmed from heavy stigmatization of the term "psychological distress". As a result, the term "Psychosocial Distress" was coined in 1999 by the National Comprehensive Cancer Network (NCCN), as a means to differentiate between the two and destigmatize such discussion between healthcare providers and patients. At the same time, they released the first psychosocial distress guidelines, where early standards were set for distress management. However, adherence to these guidelines was lacking until in 2015, "Psychosocial Support" was officialized as a criterion in Commission on Cancer (CoC) accreditation by the American College of Surgeons (ACS), which raised universal recognition of distress.

== Research directions ==
Research is needed for psychosocial care models, care disparities (for vulnerable populations), mental-emotional-relational health, population health (with demographic diversity) and digital health interventions, according to the APOS Roadmap. In addition, there needs to be more research on how metastatic/advanced disease and demographic characteristics (e.g., gender influence) can impact treatment effectiveness. Following the COVID-19 epidemic (2019-2023), further development of psychosocial crisis prevention and intervention models in an epidemic scenario is essential.

== See also ==
- Abandonment (emotional)
- Distress (medicine)
- Emotional exhaustion
- Hostile work environment
- Incident stress
- Jury stress
- Litigation stress
- Mindfulness-based stress reduction
- Psychological stress
