= AMAPCEO =

Canadian trade union

- Association of Management, Administrative and Professional Crown Employees of Ontario
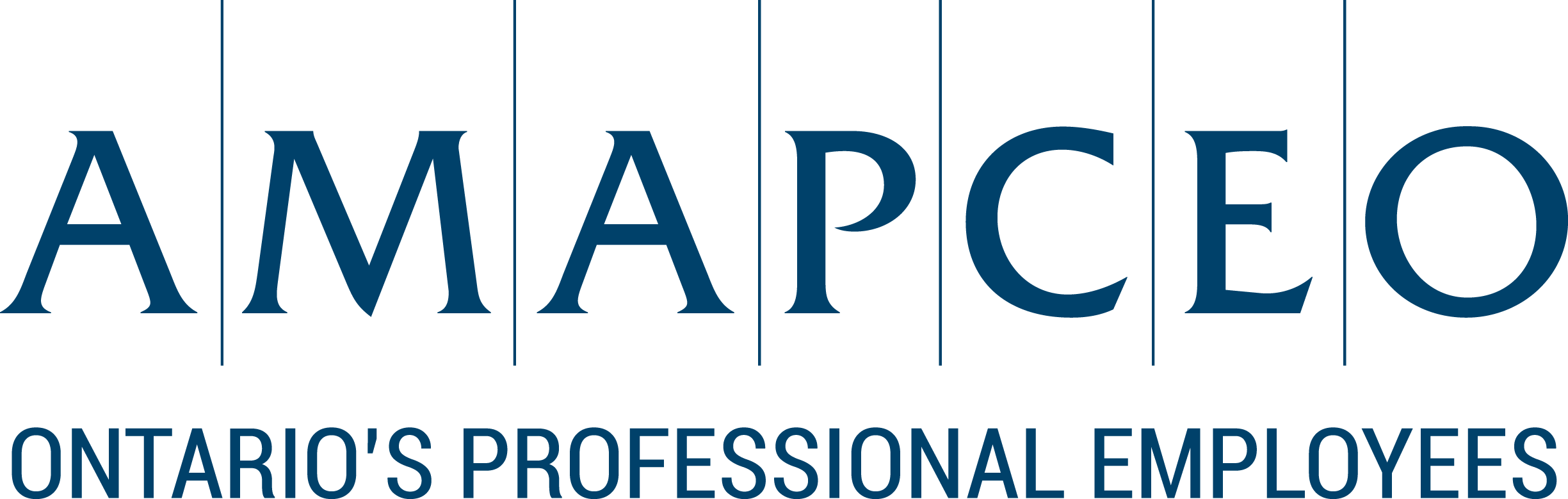
- Formation: 1992
- Type: Trade union
- Headquarters: Toronto, Ontario, Canada
- Location: Ontario, Canada
- Members: 17,000
- President: Dave Bulmer
- Affiliations: Public Services International
- Website: amapceo.on.ca

The Association of Management, Administrative and Professional Crown Employees of Ontario (AMAPCEO) (Note: Pronounced /əˈmæpsiːoʊ/ ə-MAP-see-oh) is a Canadian trade union representing mid-level provincial public servants in Ontario. It was founded in 1992, recognized as a union by the provincial government in 1995, and negotiated its first collective agreement in 1996. As of September 2024, AMAPCEO represents over 16,500 professional and supervisory public servants who either work directly for the Government of Ontario or a number of provincial agencies, boards, and regulators. It is the second-largest public-sector union in Ontario after the Ontario Public Service Employees Union, which generally represents more blue-collar workers.

== Overview ==
AMAPCEO-represented employees in the OPS work in every government ministry and in a number of agencies, boards and commissions in over 130 cities and towns across Ontario, and in twelve cities outside Canada. About eighty per cent of AMAPCEO members work in the provincial capital city of Toronto. Members include: policy analysts, financial analysts, auditors, economists, mediators, arbitrators, educators, information technology professionals, scientists, chaplains, veterinarians, program supervisors, clinical co-ordinators, psychiatric patient advocates, media relations and communications officers, epidemiologists, arts granting officers and many others. The union also represents senior economic officers in the Ontario Ministry of Economic Development, Job Creation and Trade, who are based in Canadian high commissions, embassies and consulates abroad.

As of September 2024, AMAPCEO represents over 16,500 professionals working in the public interest in Ontario.

The union's bargaining units consist of:

- the College of Midwives of Ontario;
- the Financial Services Regulatory Authority of Ontario;
- Information and Privacy Commissioner of Ontario;
- Invest Ontario;
- the Ontario Arts Council;
- the Evidence Development and Standards Department at Ontario Health - Quality Unit;
- over 14,000 employees at the Ontario Public Service;
- the pan-Canadian Pharmaceutical Alliance;
- Public Health Ontario;
- Supply Ontario;
- Waypoint Centre for Mental Health Care; and
- the former Offices of the Ontario Child Advocate and the French Language Services Commissioner (now part of the Office of the Ontario Ombudsman).

AMAPCEO also had a unit representing the Ontario Racing Commission until its 2016 merger with the Alcohol and Gaming Commission of Ontario.

== History ==
Until February 1994, when the Crown Employees Collective Bargaining Act was amended, the mid-level professionals in the Ontario public service now represented by AMAPCEO did not have collective bargaining rights and could not legally form a union. The larger Ontario Public Service Employees Union (OPSEU) had lobbied the Ontario government for decades to extend collective bargaining to this group. In 1992, what would become AMAPCEO started as a grassroots organization representing the mid-level professionals of the Ontario public service. In 1993, AMAPCEO negotiated a Social Contract sectoral framework agreement with the provincial government on behalf of 12,000 non-unionized civil servants.

OPSEU attempted to win certification as the bargaining agent for the majority of the approximately 7,000 employees with newly-granted collective bargaining rights. However, its insistence that existing OPSEU members would have seniority over all potential new members was unpopular. The potential new members also identified as professionals and not blue-collar workers. OPSEU's organizing drive failed and AMAPCEO decided to operate as a separate union. In January 1995, AMAPCEO was certified by the Ontario Labour Relations Board as the bargaining agent for its 4,600 members. The union was voluntary recognized by Premier Bob Rae's government as an official bargaining agent shortly afterwards.

The new union began negotiating its first collective-bargaining agreement with the provincial government in October 1995. Negotiations lasted until March 1996, when shortly after an OPSEU strike began, the Ontario government was incentivized to reach a deal with AMAPCEO that they could use as a precedent to strengthen their position in the OPSEU strike negotiations.

In 2014, the AMAPCEO negotiated a new, four-year collective agreement with the government of Premier Kathleen Wynne, which was eager to reduce government spending. The new deal had zero increases in the first two years and 1.4 per cent in the last two years. At the end of the year, longtime president Gary Gannage, who had held the role since November 1995 during negotiations of AMAPCEO's first contract, retired.

== Governance ==
Under a governance structure implemented on January 1, 2017, members are assigned to one of eleven geographic districts based on where they work; there are eight districts in the city of Toronto and three outside Toronto, proportionate to the distribution of AMAPCEO members across the province. Ten of the districts are about the same size (roughly between 1,000 and 1,300 members), with the northern district slightly smaller. The AMAPCEO board of directors consists of fifteen members: the four executive officers (president, vice-president, secretary and treasurer), who are elected by delegates at the annual convention, and eleven directors, each elected from and by the members in one of the 11 districts.

The board director in each district presides over a district executive committee, consisting of that district's delegates, who are elected roughly on the basis of one delegate for every 50 members. The annual convention consists of the 15 members of the board of directors plus all delegates, just over 200 in total at the present time. In the event a bargaining unit is unrepresented by a district delegate, the members in that bargaining unit separately selects one dedicated delegate from their unit, to ensure that all bargaining units are represented at the annual convention. All delegates and members of the AMAPCEO board serve two-year terms, staggered so that approximately one-half of the delegates, directors and executive officers are elected annually. AMAPCEO employs 50+ full-time professional staff who provide advice and services to members from an office in Toronto (located at 1 Dundas Street West, a location close to where most members work and where most of the union's employer counterparts are based). All employees in the office, except for the senior management staff, are members of a bargaining unit represented by the national union Unifor.

=== Presidents ===
Before being elected to his first term as president, which started on January 1, 2015, Dave Bulmer worked as a professional educator in London for the Ministry of Health and Long-Term Care. He has subsequently been re-elected a number of times. He previously served as AMAPCEO's treasurer, and before that as a director on the board. Past presidents of AMAPCEO include:

- Janet Ballantyne, 1992–1995
- Gary Gannage, 1995–2014
- Dave Bulmer, 2015–present
