= Ausma Malik =

Canadian politician (b. 1983/84)

- Malik in 2026

3rd Speaker of Toronto City Council
- Incumbent
- Assumed office November 18, 2026
- Preceded by: Frances Nunziata

Statutory Deputy Mayor of Toronto
- Incumbent
- Assumed office August 10, 2023
- Mayor: Olivia Chow
- Preceded by: Jennifer McKelvie

Deputy Mayor of Toronto for Toronto and East York
- Incumbent
- Assumed office August 10, 2023
- Mayor: Olivia Chow
- Preceded by: Ana Bailão

Toronto City Councillor for Ward 10 Spadina—Fort York
- Incumbent
- Assumed office November 15, 2022
- Preceded by: Joe Mihevc

Personal details
- Born: 1983 or 1984 (age 41–42)
- Party: Independent
- Other political affiliations: Ontario New Democratic
- Website: www.toronto.ca/city-government/council/members-of-council/councillor-ward-10/

Ausma Malik (born 1983 or 1984) is a Canadian politician who has been the statutory deputy mayor of Toronto since 2023 and the speaker of Toronto City Council since 2026. Malik was elected to Toronto City Council in 2022 and represents Ward 10 Spadina—Fort York.

Malik became the first hijab-wearing Muslim woman to be elected to public office in Canada when she served as a Toronto District School Board trustee from 2014 to 2018, and is also the first Toronto city councillor to wear a hijab. In August 2023, Mayor Olivia Chow appointed Malik as one of four deputy mayors of Toronto for the Toronto City Council term and as statutory deputy mayor.

== Early life and career ==
Ausma Malik was born in 1983 or 1984 to Pakistani immigrant parents as the third of four children and was raised in Mississauga, Ontario. In 2013, Malik earned her Bachelor of Arts with honours from St. Michael's College at the University of Toronto, where she majored in international studies and doubled minored in history and political science.

At the University of Toronto, Malik participated in student activism. In 2006, Malik attended a protest outside the American consulate in Toronto against civilian deaths caused by the Israel Defense Forces during the 2006 Lebanon War. In 2007, she was a member of the Canadian Federation of Students's Task Force on the Needs of Muslim Students, which published a report on failures to properly accommodate Muslim postsecondary students in respect to food choice, prayer space, religious holidays, and racial abuse.

Before entering politics herself, she worked on education policy for the Ontario New Democratic Party (NDP), as a labour organizer in the Association of Management, Administrative and Professional Crown Employees of Ontario, and as a staffer at the Stephen Lewis Foundation.

== Municipal politics ==
=== School trustee ===
In 2014, Malik was elected as a Toronto District School Board trustee for Ward 10 with 37% of the vote.

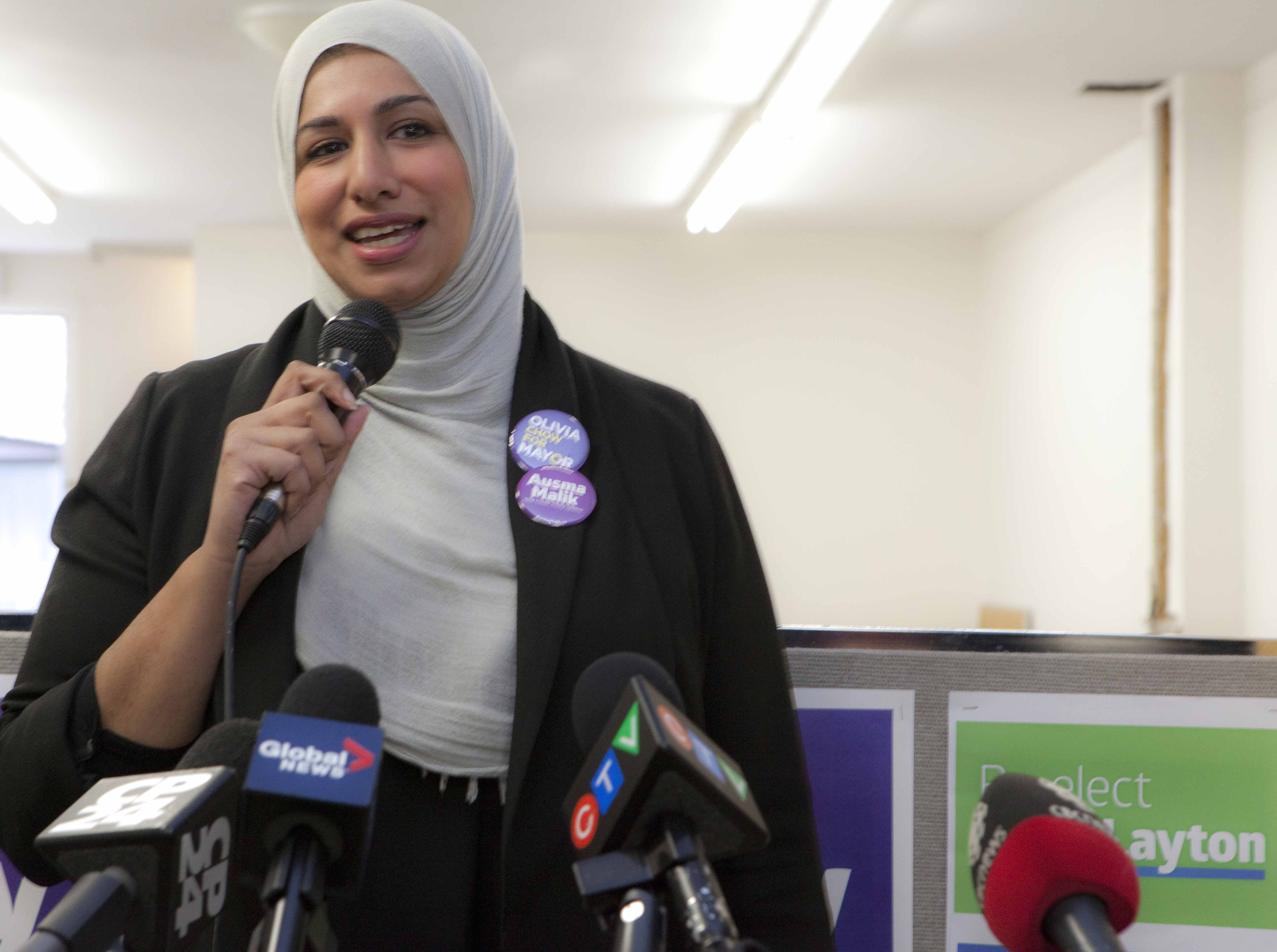
Malik speaks to the media during her 2014 campaign

Her election made her the first hijab-wearing Muslim woman elected to public office in Canada. During the campaign, Malik was the subject of an anonymous Islamophobic campaign which distributed fliers claiming she supported the Toronto 18 terror plot, Sharia law, and Hezbollah. During a ward trustee candidates debate, a small group of men interrupted her closing remarks by shouting that she was a "Jew hater" and "Hezbollah terrorist", eventually forcing her to abandon her closing statement and leave through a back door.

During the 2018 Toronto municipal election, Malik registered to run in one of the downtown wards being split from Trinity—Spadina. Incumbent councillor Joe Cressy planned to jointly campaign with her while running in the other half of his old ward, but Premier Doug Ford reduced the number of wards from 47 to 25. This eliminated the ward Malik planned to run in, and she ended her campaign. Malik did not run for re-election as a TDSB trustee and her term ended in 2018.

In January 2020, Malik was the keynote speaker at the University of Toronto's 2020 Next Steps Conference. In July 2022, Malik went on unpaid leave as a director of social engagement at the Atkinson Foundation to run for Toronto City Council.

=== Toronto City Council ===
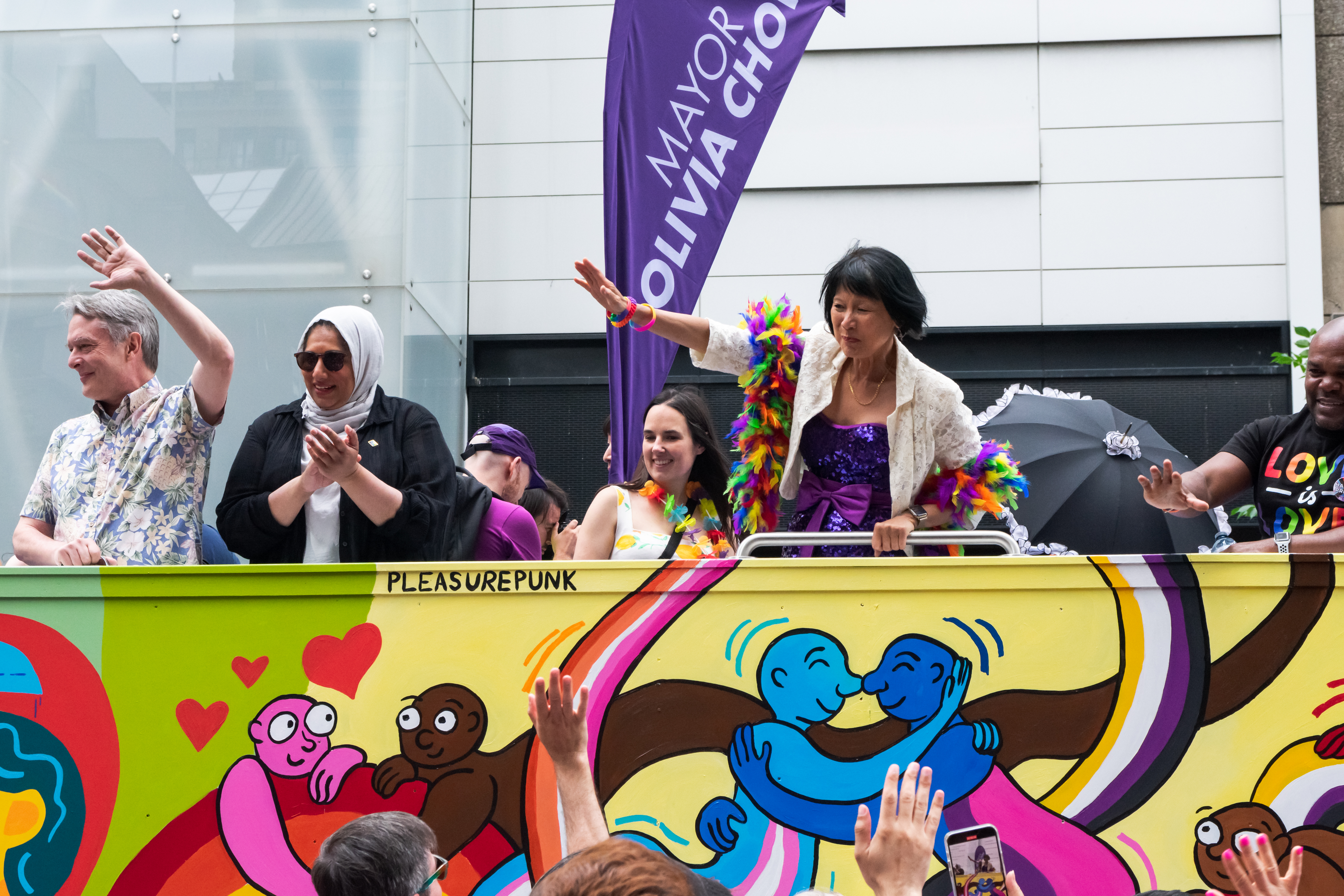
Malik with Toronto Mayor Olivia Chow at the 2024 Toronto Pride Parade

Joe Cressy, who was elected to represent the new Ward 10 Spadina—Fort York in 2018, did not run in the 2022 Toronto municipal election. Malik entered the race and was endorsed by the progressive advocacy group Progress Toronto, a registered third party in the municipal election, as well as by a number of NDP members of Provincial Parliament (MPPs). On October 24, 2022, Malik was elected to Toronto City Council. She took office on November 15.

Malik is the first Toronto city councillor to wear a hijab.

== Electoral history ==
2026 Toronto municipal election, Ward 10 Spadina—Fort York
Candidate	Votes	%	±%
Ausma Malik (X)	21,975	47.29	+10.74
Ian Cunningham	13,405	28.85	–
Xue Ding	3,767	8.11	–
Paul Nash	2,805	6.04	–
Andi Hoàng-Lefranc	2,113	4.55	–
Bashar Kassir	940	2.02	–
Aanchal Vashistha	930	2.00	–
Husain Neemuchwala	536	1.15	–
Source: City of Toronto.

2022 Toronto municipal election, Ward 10 Spadina—Fort York
Candidate	Votes	%
Ausma Malik	8,033	36.55
April Engelberg	4,690	21.34
Rocco Achampong	1,906	8.67
Peter George	1,757	7.99
Igor Samardzic	1,686	7.67
Karlene Nation	1,001	4.55
Stephanie Soltermann	661	3.01
Arber Puci	603	2.74
Laura-Maria Nikolareizi	471	2.14
Kyle Enslen	439	2.00
Robb Cooke	434	1.97
Andrei Zodian	297	1.35
Source: City of Toronto.

2014 Toronto District School Board trustee election, Ward 10 Trinity—Spadina
Candidate	Votes	%
Ausma Malik	16,197	40.02
Colleen Kennedy	7,454	18.42
Kenneth Chan	4,399	10.87
Michael Sims	3,813	9.42
Sabrina Zuniga	3,499	8.65
Tony Aires	2,178	5.38
Ybia Anderson	1,302	3.22
Richard Klagsbrun	1,099	2.72
Hans Bathija	535	1.32
Source: City of Toronto.
