= Pharmacare =

Proposed Canadian public medication insurance program

Pharmacare is a Canadian proposal for a publicly funded insurance program for medications, similar to Medicare for health insurance. Limited pharmacare programs exist in the provinces of Ontario, Manitoba, and British Columbia. Multiple organizers and commenters have advocated a pan-Canadian pharmacare program to complement the existing health system, but the precise model for implementation is unclear.

== History ==
A national pharmacare program was first proposed as part of Canada's universal health coverage plan in 1964. Attempts to create a federal program began in 1994 under Prime Minister Jean Chrétien after a recommendation from the National Forum on Health. This was followed by the Liberal Party endorsing pharmacare "as a long-term national objective" in 1997. The efforts ultimately failed over disagreements between the federal and provincial governments. Despite subsequent recommendations from the Commission on the Future of Health Care in Canada and the Canadian Senate, the efforts were discontinued in 2006 by Prime Minister Stephen Harper who had previously pledged to implement a pharmacare program.

Prime Minister Justin Trudeau talks about universal access to contraceptives and diabetes medications at Women's College Hospital in Toronto

In 2019, Prime Minister Justin Trudeau promised to implement pharmacare if re-elected. The plan was endorsed by Liberal delegates in 2021 and included as part of a Confidence and Supply agreement between the Liberal Party and NDP in 2022. In February 2024, the NDP and Liberals reached an agreement on proposed draft legislation for a pharmacare program. The proposed program would create a single-payer system to cover expenses for contraceptives and diabetes medication in the first phase, with a designated budget of $1.5 billion. Subsequent phases would develop a national formulary and national purchasing plan, at an estimated cost of $38.9 billion for the 2027/28 fiscal year. The government tabled Bill C-64 titled An Act respecting pharmacare in 2024, which passed on October 10, 2024. The Canadian Agency for Drugs and Technologies in Health (CADTH) was revamped into Canada's Drug Agency, tasked with creating a formulary and a national purchasing plan.

In September 2024, British Columbia became the first province to sign on to the program to cover birth control and diabetes medication; prior coverage provided by the province for birth control was re-allocated to hormone therapy medication for women. Manitoba joined the program in February 2025.

== See also ==
- Canadian Dental Care Plan
- Pan-Canadian Pharmaceutical Alliance
- Canada's Drug Agency
