= Spadina—Fort York =

Spadina—Fort York may refer to:

- Spadina—Fort York (federal electoral district), federal riding in Toronto, Ontario, Canada
- Spadina—Fort York (provincial electoral district), provincial riding in Toronto, Ontario, Canada
- Ward 10 Spadina—Fort York, municipal ward in Toronto, Ontario, Canada
