= Clutch (company) =

Canadian used car retailer

- Type: Private
- Industry: Online retail, used vehicle retail
- Founded: 2016
- Founders: Stephen Seibel, Andrew Dolinski, Chris Dolinski
- Headquarters: Toronto, Ontario, Canada
- Key people: Stephen Seibel (founder & president), Dan Park (CEO)
- Products: Used vehicle sales, vehicle financing
- Number of employees: ~510 (2025)
- Website: clutch.ca

Clutch Technologies Inc., operating as Clutch, is a Canadian online used car retailer headquartered in Toronto, Ontario, with its primary vehicle inspection and reconditioning facility in Mississauga. Founded in 2016 and beginning operations in Halifax in 2017, the company sells pre-owned vehicles directly to consumers through a vertically integrated model in which it purchases, inspects, reconditions, and delivers vehicles.

After raising venture capital during the pandemic-era expansion of online used-car retail in Canada, Clutch grew rapidly before retrenching sharply in 2023 amid a downturn in technology financing and the used-vehicle market. Following layoffs and a withdrawal from Western Canada, the company restructured its operations, returned to growth in 2024 and 2025, and resumed expansion into British Columbia in August 2025.

== History ==
=== Founding and early growth (2016–2021) ===
Clutch was founded in 2016 by Stephen Seibel, a former investment banker who later became the company's chief operating officer, together with co-founders Andrew Dolinski and Chris Dolinski. The company began operations in Halifax in 2017, with founders citing lower start-up costs and limited competition as reasons for choosing the city. Dan Park, previously head of Uber Eats in Canada, was recruited as chief executive officer in 2019 by early investor BrandProject.

In January 2020, Clutch entered the Toronto market. The launch initially faced opposition from Ontario used-car dealers who challenged the legality of its service; the company subsequently registered with the Ontario Motor Vehicle Industry Council. Clutch raised a C$7 million seed round in 2020 to expand its operations. In 2021, it raised C$60 million, comprising equity financing led by Canaan Partners and debt financing from Upper90, and in November 2021 announced a C$100 million Series B equity round led by D1 Capital Partners, with participation from earlier investors including Canaan Partners, Upper90, Real Ventures, BrandProject, and FJ Labs.

=== Downturn and restructuring (2022–2023) ===
In mid-2022 following the 2022 stock market decline, Clutch reduced its workforce by approximately 22 percent. In January 2023, after a planned C$95 million Series C round did not close, the company laid off roughly 65 percent of its staff (about 148 employees) and withdrew from Western Canada to concentrate on Ontario and Atlantic Canada. Reporting in 2023 described a subsequent financing that valued the company at a small fraction of its late-2021 peak of approximately C$575 million.

=== Recovery and expansion (2024–2025) ===
In a 2024 interview with Globe and Mail Report on Business magazine, Park described the period as one in which "the mandate shifted from aggressive growth to profitability at all costs." The company reported revenue of C$320 million for 2024, an increase of about 81 percent year-over-year, and said it had reached profitability. In February 2025, Clutch raised C$50 million in a round led by Altos Ventures, which reset its valuation slightly above its 2021 peak. During 2025 it opened a inspection and reconditioning facility in Mississauga and reported surpassing C$1 billion in cumulative vehicle purchases. In August 2025, Clutch returned to the British Columbia market it had exited in 2023, reopening a facility in Richmond to buy vehicles from individual sellers and reselling them through wholesale channels rather than directly to consumers.

== Business model ==
Clutch operates an online retail model. Clutch purchases used vehicles from individual sellers, inspects and reconditions them at its own facilities, and sells them to buyers with home delivery and a money-back return period. Vehicles undergo a mechanical inspection before being listed at non-negotiable prices. This direct-retail model differs from listings platforms such as AutoTrader and Kijiji, which aggregate vehicle listings from dealers and private sellers without owning the vehicles.

Following its 2023 restructuring, Clutch narrowed its sourcing to individual sellers through its website rather than wholesale auctions, reduced reconditioning spending, began charging for deliveries, and secured lower-cost inventory financing.

Clutch has been compared by analysts and trade press to international online used-car companies that emerged in the late 2010s and early 2020s, including Carvana in the United States, Cazoo in the United Kingdom, and Kavak in Mexico. Several of these peers later contracted or exited the direct-retail model: Cazoo entered administration in May 2024, and Canadian competitor Canada Drives ended online vehicle sales in March 2023 to refocus on automotive lead generation. A 2022 Automotive News analysis identified Clutch and Canada Drives as the leading challengers to traditional Canadian used-vehicle retail.

== Recognition ==
Clutch has appeared on Deloitte Canada's Technology Fast 50 ranking of fastest-growing technology companies and on The Globe and Mail's Canada's Top Growing Companies list, including a placement of 132nd in the 2025 Top Growing Companies ranking. An Ivey Business School case-study was written on Clutch in 2025, challenging students to chart course of action following the companies $100 million Series B raise.
