= Ministry of Public and Business Service Delivery and Procurement =

Canadian provincial ministry responsible for public services

- French: Ministère des Services au public et aux entreprises et de l’Approvisionnement
- Government of Ontario wordmark

Ministry overview
- Formed: 2005
- Preceding agencies: Management Board Secretariat; Ministry of Consumer and Business Services; Ministry of Government and Consumer Services
- Jurisdiction: Government of Ontario
- Minister responsible: Stephen Crawford, Minister of Public and Business Service Delivery
- Ministry executive: Samantha Poisson, Deputy Minister
- Website: www.ontario.ca/page/ministry-public-business-service-delivery

The Ministry of Public and Business Service Delivery and Procurement (French: Ministère des Services au public et aux entreprises et de l’Approvisionnement) is a ministry of the Government of Ontario. It is responsible for ServiceOntario, which, among other responsibilities, issues driver's licenses, health cards, birth certificates and other provincial documents to Ontario residents. Additionally, it oversees the Archives of Ontario, Supply Ontario and numerous boards and administrative authorities charged with consumer protection in specific sectors and industries, such as condominiums and travel.

Stephen Crawford is the minister of public and business service delivery and procurement and is responsible for the ministry to the provincial legislature. The minister is supported by the deputy minister, currently Samantha Poisson, a senior career public servant who supports the minister in managing the operations of the ministry.

== History ==
Prior to 1972, the Department of Public Works was responsible for the function of providing and maintaining the buildings and facilities that house the operations of the provincial government.

In November 1966, the Department of Financial and Commercial Affairs was established and acquired the responsibility for the regulation of insurance companies, loan and trust companies, and the trading of securities in Ontario. In 1967, a Consumer Protection Division was established to be responsible for a newly created Consumer Protection Bureau. In 1968, it acquired further responsibility over the regulation of credit unions, cemeteries, upholstered and stuffed articles, and the sale of goods and services. In 1970, it further acquired responsibility over the incorporation of companies and the regulation of lotteries.

In 1972, the Government of Ontario was considerably re-organized as the various Departments were restructured and renamed as Ministries.

In 1972, the Ministry of Government Services was created, assuming most of the functions of the former Department of Public Works. Over the years in its various forms, the Ministry assumed various responsibility in support of the operations of the provincial government, including maintenance of government buildings; centralized services for government employees; central mail and translation services; information technology and services, etc.

Also in 1972, the Ministry of Consumer and Commercial Relations and assumed all responsibilities of the Department of Financial and Commercial Affairs. The new Ministry also acquired the functions associated with the promotion of public safety for boilers, elevators, building standards and fuels, the regulation of theatres, the Liquor Control Board of Ontario and the Liquor License Board of Ontario. In 1986, a standalone Ministry of Financial Institutions and assumed the responsibility over the Ontario Securities Commission and the Pension Commission of Ontario.

In 1993, the Management Board Secretariat absorbed the existing Ministry of Government Services, assuming its function in providing internal corporate services to the provincial government.

In February 2001, the Ministry of Consumer and Commercial Relations was renamed the Ministry of Consumer and Business Services.

In 2005, the Ministry of Government Services was re-created from the merger of Management Board Secretariat and the Ministry of Consumer and Business Services. The Ministry was headed by a Minister, who was also chair of the Management Board of Cabinet. When the ministry was created, Premier Dalton McGuinty described it as the "chief operating officer of government." The position combined responsibility for consumer protection, business regulation, management of the civil service, labour negotiations and the central plumbing of government: IT, procurement, and shared services. In 2007, the Ministry was renamed Ministry of Government and Consumer Services.

One of the main projects of the ministry was the creation of ServiceOntario. When it was completed in 2011, ServiceOntario was the one-stop shop for all government retail operations. Any and all routine transactions between the government and the public are performed through ServiceOntario offices, websites, call centres or kiosks. Alongside ServiceOntario, the ministry offers access to its public records through three of its licensed service providers, one of which is ESC Corporate Services.

In June 2022, the Ministry of Government and Consumer Services (MGCS) was renamed to the Ministry of Public and Business Service Delivery (MPBSD) as part of Premier Doug Ford's Cabinet update.

== Responsibilities ==
The ministry is responsible for several key area, including:

- consumer protection and public safety
- business law
- provide Ontario government ministries and employees with corporate services including procurement, finance, HR, pay and benefits
- collect, manage and preserve historical records of the Ontario Government
- policy leadership in record-keeping, freedom of information, privacy protection, and information management

The ministry oversees a number of boards and administrative authorities, including:

- Advertising Review Board
- Bereavement Authority Of Ontario
- Business Law Modernization and Burden Reduction Council
- Condominium Authority Of Ontario
- Condominium Management Regulatory Authority Of Ontario
- Electrical Safety Authority
- Minister's Digital and Data Taskforce
- Ontario One Call
- Ontario Motor Vehicle Industry Council
- Real Estate Council of Ontario
- Tarion Warranty Corporation
- Technical Standards and Safety Authority
- Travel Industry Council of Ontario

== List of ministers ==
Name	Term of office		Name	Term of office		Political party (Ministry)	Note
			Minister of Financial and Commercial Affairs			PC (Robarts)	
			Leslie Rowntree	November 24, 1966	February 5, 1970	PC (Robarts)	
			Bert Lawrence	February 5, 1970	March 1, 1971	PC (Robarts)	
			Arthur Wishart	March 1, 1971	December 8, 1971	PC (Davis)	
			Gordon Carton	December 8, 1971	February 2, 1972	PC (Davis)	
			Eric Winkler	February 2, 1972	April 10, 1972	PC (Davis)	
Minister of Government Services			Minister of Consumer and Commercial Relations			PC (Davis)	
James Snow	February 2, 1972 (Note: Snow was announced as Minister of Government Services at the February 2, 1972 shuffle, and legislation to reorganized and renamed the old public works department was enacted on April 7, 1972)	October 7, 1975	Eric Winkler	April 10, 1972	September 28, 1972	PC (Davis)	
James Snow	February 2, 1972	October 7, 1975	John Clement	September 28, 1972	June 18, 1975	PC (Davis)	
James Snow	February 2, 1972	October 7, 1975	Sid Handleman	June 18, 1975	September 21, 1977	PC (Davis)	
Margaret Scrivener	October 7, 1975	February 3, 1977	Sid Handleman	June 18, 1975	September 21, 1977	PC (Davis)	
John Smith	February 3, 1977	June 23, 1977	Sid Handleman	June 18, 1975	September 21, 1977	PC (Davis)	
James Auld	June 23, 1977	September 21, 1977	Sid Handleman	June 18, 1975	September 21, 1977	PC (Davis)	
George McCague	September 21, 1977	January 21, 1978	Larry Grossman	September 21, 1977	October 18, 1978	PC (Davis)	
Lorne Henderson	January 21, 1978	August 30, 1979	Larry Grossman	September 21, 1977	October 18, 1978	PC (Davis)	
Lorne Henderson	January 21, 1978	August 30, 1979	Frank Drea	October 18, 1978	April 10, 1981	PC (Davis)	
Douglas Wiseman	August 30, 1979	July 6, 1983	Frank Drea	October 18, 1978	April 10, 1981	PC (Davis)	
Douglas Wiseman	August 30, 1979	July 6, 1983	Gordon Walker	April 10, 1981	February 13, 1982	PC (Davis)	
Douglas Wiseman	August 30, 1979	July 6, 1983	Robert Elgie	February 13, 1982	February 8, 1985	PC (Davis)	
George Ashe	July 6, 1983	February 8, 1985	Robert Elgie	February 13, 1982	February 8, 1985	PC (Davis)	
Bob Runciman	February 8, 1985	May 17, 1985	Gordon Walker	February 8, 1985	May 17, 1985	PC (Miller)	
Jim Gordon	May 17, 1985	June 26, 1985	Bob Runciman	May 17, 1985	June 26, 1985	PC (Miller)	
Elinor Caplan	June 26, 1985	June 16, 1986	Monte Kwinter	June 26, 1985	September 29, 1987	Liberal (Peterson)	(Note: During this period, the following held a portfolio as Ministers of Financial Institutions, which served some consumer protection functions: Monte Kwinter (April 1, 1986 - September 29, 1987) Bob Nixon (September 29, 1987 - August 16, 1988) Murray Elston (August 16, 1988 - October 1, 1990))
Sean Conway	June 17, 1986	September 9, 1987	Monte Kwinter	June 26, 1985	September 29, 1987	Liberal (Peterson)	
Richard Patten	September 29, 1987	August 2, 1989	Bill Wrye	September 29, 1987	August 2, 1989	Liberal (Peterson)	
Chris Ward	August 2, 1989	October 1, 1990	Greg Sorbara	August 2, 1989	October 1, 1990	Liberal (Peterson)	
Frances Lankin	October 1, 1990	April 22, 1991	Peter Kormos	October 1, 1990	March 18, 1991	NDP (Rae)	
Frances Lankin	October 1, 1990	April 22, 1991	Marilyn Churley	March 18, 1991	June 26, 1995	NDP (Rae)	(Note: During this period, the following held a portfolio as Ministers of Financial Institutions, which serves some consumer protection functions: Peter Kormos (October 1, 1990 – March 18, 1991) Brian Charlton (March 18, 1991 - February 3, 1993))
Fred Wilson	April 22, 1991	February 3, 1993	Marilyn Churley	March 18, 1991	June 26, 1995	NDP (Rae)	(Note: During this period, the following held a portfolio as Ministers of Financial Institutions, which serves some consumer protection functions: Peter Kormos (October 1, 1990 – March 18, 1991) Brian Charlton (March 18, 1991 - February 3, 1993))
Chair of the Management Board of Cabinet			Marilyn Churley	March 18, 1991	June 26, 1995	NDP (Rae)	
Brian Charlton	February 3, 1993	June 26, 1995	Marilyn Churley	March 18, 1991	June 26, 1995	NDP (Rae)	
David Johnson	June 26, 1995	October 10, 1997	Norm Sterling	June 26, 1995	August 16, 1996	PC (Harris)	
David Johnson	June 26, 1995	October 10, 1997	David Tsubouchi	August 16, 1996	June 17, 1999	PC (Harris)	
Chris Hodgson	October 10, 1997	February 8, 2001	David Tsubouchi	August 16, 1996	June 17, 1999	PC (Harris)	
Chris Hodgson	October 10, 1997	February 8, 2001	Bob Runciman	June 17, 1999	February 7, 2001	PC (Harris)	
David Tsubouchi	February 8, 2001	April 15, 2002	Minister of Consumer and Business Services			PC (Harris)	
David Tsubouchi	February 8, 2001	April 15, 2002	Norm Sterling	February 8, 2001	April 14, 2002	PC (Harris)	
David Tsubouchi	April 15, 2002	October 22, 2003	Tim Hudak	April 15, 2002	October 22, 2003	PC (Eves)	
Gerry Phillips	October 22, 2003	June 29, 2005	Jim Watson	October 30, 2003	June 29, 2005	Liberal (McGuinty)	
Minister of Government Services			Small Business and Entrepreneurship			Liberal (McGuinty)	
Gerry Phillips	June 29, 2005	October 30, 2007	Harinder Takhar	May 23, 2006	July 8, 2008	Liberal (McGuinty)	
Minister of Government and Consumer Services			Harinder Takhar	May 23, 2006	July 8, 2008	Liberal (McGuinty)	
Ted McMeekin	October 30, 2007	July 8, 2008	Harinder Takhar	May 23, 2006	July 8, 2008	Liberal (McGuinty)	
Minister of Government Services			Minister of Small Business and Consumer Services			Liberal (McGuinty)	
Ted McMeekin	July 8, 2008	June 24, 2009	Harinder Takhar	July 9, 2008	June 24, 2009	Liberal (McGuinty)	
Harinder Takhar	June 24, 2009	November 27, 2012	Minister of Consumer Services			Liberal (McGuinty)	
Harinder Takhar	June 24, 2009	November 27, 2012	Ted McMeekin	June 24, 2009	January 18, 2010	Liberal (McGuinty)	
Harinder Takhar	June 24, 2009	November 27, 2012	Sophia Aggelonitis	January 18, 2010	August 18, 2010	Liberal (McGuinty)	
Harinder Takhar	June 24, 2009	November 27, 2012	John Gerretsen	August 18, 2010	October 20, 2011	Liberal (McGuinty)	
Harinder Takhar	June 24, 2009	November 27, 2012	Margarett Best	October 20, 2011	February 11, 2013	Liberal (McGuinty)	
Dwight Duncan	November 27, 2012	February 11, 2013	Margarett Best	October 20, 2011	February 11, 2013	Liberal (McGuinty)	
Harinder Takhar	February 11, 2013	May 8, 2013	Tracy MacCharles	February 11, 2013	June 24, 2014	Liberal (Wynne)	
John Milloy	May 8, 2013	June 24, 2014	Tracy MacCharles	February 11, 2013	June 24, 2014	Liberal (Wynne)	
Minister of Government and Consumer Services						Liberal (Wynne)	
David Orazietti				June 24, 2014	June 13, 2016	Liberal (Wynne)	
Marie-France Lalonde				June 13, 2016	January 12, 2017	Liberal (Wynne)	
Tracy MacCharles				January 12, 2017	June 29, 2018	Liberal (Wynne)	
Todd Smith				June 29, 2018	November 5, 2018	PC (Ford)	
Bill Walker				November 5, 2018	June 20, 2019	PC (Ford)	
Minister of Government and Consumer Services						PC (Ford)	
Lisa Thompson				June 20, 2019	June 18, 2021	PC (Ford)	
Ross Romano				June 18, 2021	June 24, 2022	PC (Ford)	
Minister of Public and Business Service Delivery						PC (Ford)	
Kaleed Rasheed				June 24, 2022	September 20, 2023	PC (Ford)	
Todd McCarthy				September 20, 2023	June 6, 2024	PC (Ford)	
Minister of Public and Business Service Delivery and Procurement						PC (Ford)	
Todd McCarthy				June 6, 2024	March 19, 2025	PC (Ford)	
Stephen Crawford				March 19, 2025	Present	PC (Ford)	
