= ServiceOntario =

Ontario government service centres

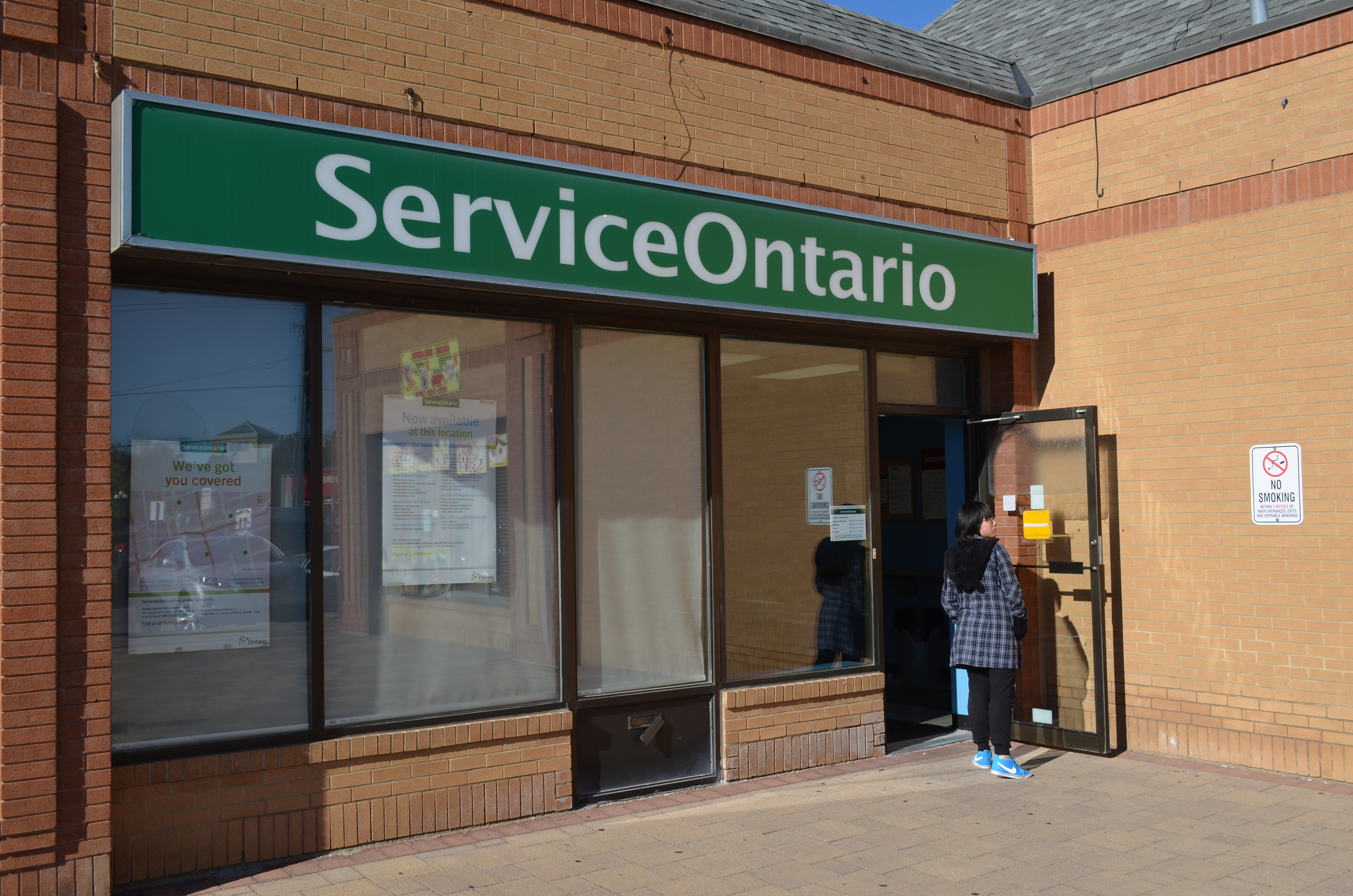
- A ServiceOntario location in Markham

Agency overview
- Formed: 2006
- Minister responsible: Minister of Public and Business Service Delivery and Procurement
- Website: www.ontario.ca/welcome-serviceontario

ServiceOntario is part of the Ministry of Public and Business Service Delivery and Procurement which provides a single point of contact for core provincial government services to individuals and businesses in the province of Ontario, Canada. Established in 2006 from the existing network of Driver and Vehicle Licence Issuing Offices, ServiceOntario provides services primarily online and in-person at storefront locations, and also operates telephone call centres.

Some services were also formerly provided by automated ServiceOntario self-service kiosks located primarily in shopping malls. Following the discovery in 2012 that illegal card skimming devices were installed on some kiosks in the Greater Toronto Area, all kiosks were shut down province-wide for security reasons. The provincial government permanently discontinued the kiosks later that year.

Some ServiceOntario locations are operated by private businesses under contract to the government. Since 2024, the provincial government has also piloted the co-location of ServiceOntario locations within retail stores.

== Services ==
The following are some of the services delivered by ServiceOntario on behalf of the government:

- Ontario Health Insurance Plan registration and health card renewals
- Birth, marriage and death certificates
- Driver and vehicle licensing (except driver testing and related transactions, which are generally delivered by separate DriveTest centres operated under contract by Serco)
- Business registration
- Fishing and hunting licence
- Ontario Photo Card
- Address change
- Newborn registration
- Ontario government publications
- Landlord Tenant Board services
- Commissioner of Oaths services

== Retail locations ==
In January 2024, the Doug Ford government announced that some standalone ServiceOntario locations would be closed and replaced by locations co-located within retail stores as a pilot project. The majority of these locations are situated within Staples Canada stores, while two are located at Walmart stores. The program is intended to reduce the costs of delivering the services, reduce wait times, and increase availability, with further partnerships with other businesses being investigated. Doug Ford defended the scheme as similar to Canada Post locations co-located within pharmacies.

The program has faced criticism; the Ontario NDP questioned the provincial government's decision to enter into a taxpayer-funded sole-source contract with an American-owned corporation to deliver government services. Taxpayer money is being used to fund the construction of the in-store locations, at an estimated cost of $1.75 million. A request was made to the Financial Accountability Office by the Liberal Party in regards to the deal. In January 2025, the FAO released a report noting that the deal would cost the government $1.5 million more than the initial government estimation of $10.2 million. The report found that the new locations had 47.7% longer operating hours due to being tied to the stores' hours, but 30% less service desks. The FAO also found that the deal cost the government $800,000 more than retaining the original ServiceOntario operators with the same hours of operation.

== See also ==
- Service Canada
