= Ontario Motor Vehicle Industry Council =

Regulator of motor vehicle sales in Ontario, Canada

Agency overview
- Formed: 1997
- Jurisdiction: Government of Ontario
- Minister responsible: Stephen Crawford, Minister of Public and Business Service Delivery and Procurement
- Agency executive: Maureen Harquail, CEO
- Key document: Motor Vehicle Dealers Act
- Website: omvic.ca

OMVIC (Ontario Motor Vehicle Industry Council) is a council that regulates motor vehicle sales, administers and enforces the Motor Vehicle Dealers Act on behalf of the Ontario Ministry of Government and Consumer Services (MGCS) in Ontario. OMVIC's mandate is to maintain a fair and informed marketplace, by protecting the rights of consumers while enhancing the professionalism of the industry, and ensuring fair, honest, and open competition for registered motor vehicle dealers.

OMVIC has been embroiled in several controversies in the past few years, related to the integrity of its leadership and its willingness to help consumers.

== History ==
Prior to 1997, Ontario's motor vehicle dealer industry was regulated by the Ministry of Consumer and Commercial Relations (now the Ministry of Government and Consumer Services). OMVIC's creation on April 7, 1997, marked the first regulated business sector to move to self-management.

OMVIC's authority for day-to-day administration comes from the Safety and Consumer Statutes Administration Act. The Safety and Consumer Statutes Administration Act (Bill 54) was proclaimed on July 22, 1996. This Act, as provided for in Bill 54, created "administrative authorities"—non-profit corporations independent of both industry associations and the government—that deliver services and programs for different industries regulated by the ministry.

== Services ==
As the regulator of motor vehicle sales in Ontario, OMVIC's mandate is to maintain a fair and informed marketplace by protecting the rights of consumers, enhancing industry professionalism, and ensuring fair, honest, and open competition for registered motor vehicle dealers.

This is achieved by:

- Maintaining strict dealer and salesperson registration requirements
- Inspecting all Ontario motor vehicle dealers (new and used)
- Providing free complaint handling to consumers
- Developing and delivering consumer and dealer education and awareness programs
- Investigating and prosecuting industry non-compliance and illegal sales (curbside)

== OMVIC’s Objectives ==
OMVIC is focused on achieving:

- Consumer protection through the pursuit of those who would prey on an unwary public
- increased consumer confidence through compliance activities and complaint handling
- Consumer awareness through the dissemination of information concerning consumer rights (public information and awareness programs)
- Dealer professionalism through certification programs for new dealers and salespersons

== Registration ==
Registration with OMVIC is mandatory for all automotive dealers (new or used) and salespeople in Ontario.

In order to become registered as a dealer or salesperson, each applicant is screened to ensure they meet the requirements of the Motor Vehicle Dealers Act (MVDA). OMVIC conducts a number of background checks on all applicants, and each applicant is required to provide a Canada-wide criminal record search at the time of application. These processes help ensure registered dealers and salespeople will conduct themselves with honesty and integrity and in a financially responsible manner—all requirements of the MVDA.

The minimum fine for acting as an unregistered dealer (curbsider) is $5,000.

=== Education ===
Registered dealers and salespeople who successfully pass the Certification Course through Georgian College's Automotive Business School of Canada and who then become registered with OMVIC are entitled to use the designation C.A.L.E., Certified in Automotive Law and Ethics.

Using the C.A.L.E. designation builds trust, strengthens credibility, and demonstrates to consumers that dealers and salespeople are proven professionals who have met Georgian College and OMVIC training standards.

=== Complaints and Inquiries ===
OMVIC's Complaints and Inquiries Team handles inquiries and complaints from both consumers and dealers regarding the conduct of OMVIC-registered dealers.

Remember: These services are only available when consumers purchase from an OMVIC-registered dealer. OMVIC has no jurisdiction over private sales, manufacturers, or independent repair facilities.

OMVIC cannot force or compel a dealer to give money back or offer compensation. OMVIC is not the court, and only a court can impose a solution.

== Enforcement ==
=== Inspections ===
Dealer inspections are conducted to ensure ongoing compliance with the MVDA.

OMVIC inspectors are based regionally to provide an inspection program for the entire province.

If OMVIC receives a complaint from the public about a dealer, OMVIC's Complaints and Inquiries Team may attempt to resolve the issue over the telephone. Alternatively, an OMVIC inspector may perform an inspection and discuss the complaint with the dealer.

Inspectors have the right to:

- Access and inspect the dealer's premises, vehicles, books, and records,
- Remove records to make photocopies, and,
- Make inquiries regarding any complaint about the dealer's conduct.

The dealer must assist the inspector when asked, such as by producing a document or record or helping the inspector use the dealer's own data storage, processing, or retrieval device.

== Latest Reports ==
In 2021, the Office of the Auditor General of Ontario (OAGO) completed its first value-for-money audit of OMVIC. The Auditor General reported the following concerns, among others:

"Our audit found that about 50% of the 5,400 complaints against motor vehicle dealers handled by OMVIC between 2016 and 2020 resulted in no resolution for consumers. In these cases, consumers were left with no choice but to pursue their dispute in civil court. We also found that OMVIC does not have the authority to compel a motor vehicle dealer to compensate a consumer, even in instances where OMVIC determines that the dealer has breached the law." p. 1

"Our audit also found that OMVIC has been accumulating large surpluses instead of using the revenues it generates to enhance and improve consumer protection." ...."We also found that while OMVIC committed to increasing consumer awareness, increasing its spending in this area from $1.2 million in 2015 to nearly $2 million in 2019, 73% of Ontarians it surveyed between 2016 and 2020 were not aware of OMVIC and the protections it offered to vehicle purchasers." pp. 1–2

"We also noted that OMVIC’s Board of Directors is heavily represented by motor vehicle dealers even though OMVIC is a consumer protection agency. As well, we found that OMVIC does not have term limits for its Board members. As a result, we found that at the time of our audit, some Board members had served on the Board for 14 years or more. Over their tenure on the Board, these members held key positions such as Chair, Vice-Chair and Secretary-Treasurer. Our concerns about Board governance at OMVIC also included interference with the independent function of the Compensation Fund Board, and approving claims for alcohol and meals at rates in excess of OMVIC’s allowable limits." p2

OMVIC has acknowledged the areas identified for improvement in the Auditor General's report and remains committed to enhancing its performance. According to the latest report from OAGO in 2023, it was mentioned that as of October 20, 2023, OMVIC had fully implemented more than half of the actions that were recommended in their 2021 annual report.

The latest report (2023) also claimed that OMVIC has kept their reports accurate, complete and consistent on their website. They have also reported the customer surveys it conducts, and reported on completed inspections and site visits separately.

Whilst it was openly recommended that OMVIC’s meal reimbursement rates were higher than those of the Ontario government, the latest audit report informs us that the new policy now prohibits reimbursement of alcohol use, unless the CEO has signed off on it.

According to an article in the Vancouver Sun in 2021, “Ontario consumers may not know it, but we have a gem of an organization in this province that makes purchasing vehicles much safer.”

The organization recognizes the importance of consumer protection in the motor vehicle industry and continues to work diligently toward addressing the shortcomings highlighted in the audit. By implementing the recommendations provided in the report and adopting measures to strengthen oversight, OMVIC aims to better fulfill its mandate of safeguarding consumers and ensuring fair practices within the industry.

== See also ==
- Ministry of Government and Consumer Services (Ontario)
