= Canada's Drug Agency =

Independent government health agency

Canada's Drug Agency (CDA; French: L’Agence des médicaments du Canada; AMC) is a pan-Canadian health organization responsible for coordinating and aligning drug policy across provinces and territories. Canada's Drug Agency provides Canada's various healthcare organizations with evidence-based advice, allowing them to make informed choices about drug, health technology, and health system policies, in collaboration with international partners. Its role differs from that of Health Canada in that it can provide data on the comparative effectiveness of drugs and make recommendations that factor in metrics beyond safety and quality, including cost effectiveness.

== History ==
In Canada, healthcare falls under the jurisdiction of provinces and territories. As such, historically each province has managed their own pharmaceutical system, from formularies to public prescription drug programs, in different ways. This meant that health technology assessments were performed independently by a patchwork of organizations, with some provinces, like Quebec and British Columbia having their own in-house organizations, and others not having any at all. In 1989, the CDA's predecessor, the Canadian Coordinating Office for Health Technology Assessment (CCOHTA), was created by the federal government in response to this challenge. In 2006, the organization became the Canadian Agency for Drugs and Technologies in Health (CADTH).

In 2021, the Canadian federal government established the Canadian Drug Agency Transition Office (CDATO). Its mandate was to help transition the CADTH into a new organization, Canada's Drug Agency, which would absorb and "build on CADTH's existing mandate and functions," including the goal of maintaining affordable prices for pharmaceutical drugs. The same year, CDATO began holding consultations with various stakeholders, including healthcare professionals, private insurers, medical institutions, academia, and research organizations. Provincial and territorial involvement was crucial, as some of the new tasks envisioned for the future CDA-AMC were already being handled by region-specific organizations, like the Institut national d'excellence en santé et en services sociaux (INESSS) in Quebec.

Upon completion of the Transition Office's work, CADTH was officially transitioned into Canada's Drug Agency on May 1, 2024, with the federal government allocating $89.5 million over the next five years to its continued development. The move constitutes the first steps towards the establishment of a National Pharmacare Program.

== See also ==
- Canada's Drug Agency (CDA-AMC)
- International Conference on Harmonisation of Technical Requirements for Registration of Pharmaceuticals for Human Use (ICH)
- Food and Drug Administration (FDA, USA)
- European Medicines Agency (EMEA, EU)
- Health Canada
- Pharmacare
