= Supply Ontario =

- ApprovisiOntario

Agency overview
- Type: Crown agency
- Jurisdiction: Government of Ontario
- Headquarters: Toronto, Ontario
- Minister responsible: Stephen Crawford, Minister of Public and Business Service Delivery and Procurement, with responsibility for Supply Ontario
- Agency executives: Jamie Wallace, Chief Executive Officer; Paul G. Smith, Board Chair
- Parent ministry: Ministry of Public and Business Service Delivery and Procurement
- Website: www.supplyontario.ca

Centralized Supply Chain Ontario (CSCO; French: Gestion centralisée de la chaîne d'approvisionnement Ontario), operating as Supply Ontario (French: ApprovisiOntario), is a Crown agency of the Government of Ontario. Created in 2020, the agency's mandate is to provide and support supply chain management and procurement activities for the provincial government, the broader public sector, and health care sector.

== Governance and leadership ==
The agency was established in 2020 by the Progressive Conservative (PC) Party government of Premier Doug Ford under Ontario Regulation 612/20, made under the Supply Chain Management Act (Government, Broader Public Sector and Health Sector Entities), 2019. The agency was initially under the Ministry of Government and Consumer Services (MGCS), and briefly the Treasury Board Secretariat (TBS). In June 2024, the agency returned to MGCS, which had since been re-named to Ministry of Public and Business Service Delivery and Procurement (MPBSDP).

Chief executive officers
No.	Name	Start date	End date	Reference	Notes
1	Frank P. Rochon	March 1, 2021	August 4, 2022		
2	Jamie Wallace	January 23, 2023	Incumbent		Former chief of staff to Premier Doug Ford

Board chairs
No.	Name	Start date	End date	Reference
1	Paul G. Smith	January 2021	Incumbent	
