= Ward 10 Spadina—Fort York =

Municipal council district in Toronto, Ontario, Canada

- Constituency for the Toronto City Council
- Location of Ward 10 in Toronto
- City: Toronto
- Population: 115,510 (2016)

Current constituency
- Created: 2018
- Councillor: Ausma Malik
- Community council: Toronto/East York
- Created from: Southern parts of wards 19, 20, 27 and 28
- First contested: 2018 election
- Last contested: 2026 election
- Ward profile: www.toronto.ca/ward-10-spadina-fort-york/

Ward 10 Spadina—Fort York is a municipal electoral division in Toronto, Ontario, Canada that has been represented in the Toronto City Council since the 2018 municipal election. It was last contested in 2026, with Ausma Malik being elected councillor.

== Boundaries ==
On August 14, 2018, the Government of Ontario redrew municipal boundaries via the Better Local Government Act, 2018, S.O. 2018, c. 11 - Bill 5. This means that the 25 provincial electoral districts and the 25 municipal wards in Toronto currently share the same geographic borders.

Defined in legislation as:

Consisting of that part of the City of Toronto described as follows: commencing at the intersection of Ossington Avenue with Dundas Street West; thence generally easterly along said street to Bay Street; thence generally southerly along said street to Front Street West; thence generally northeasterly along said street to Yonge Street; thence southerly along said street to The Esplanade; thence generally easterly along The Esplanade to Berkeley Street; thence easterly in a straight line to the intersection of Mill Street with Parliament Street; thence easterly along Mill Street and its easterly production to the Don River; thence southerly along said river to the Keating Channel; thence southwesterly along said channel and its production to the southerly production of Parliament Street; thence southerly in a straight line to the southerly extremity of the Eastern Channel of Toronto Harbour; thence southwesterly in a straight line to the southerly corner of the City of Toronto, said corner being situated southerly of the Outer Harbour East Headland (Tommy Thompson Park); thence generally westerly along the southerly limit of said city to the southerly production of Spencer Avenue; thence northerly along said production to the F. G. Gardiner Expressway; thence easterly along said expressway to Dufferin Street; thence northerly along said street to Queen Street West; thence easterly along said street to the GO Transit Railway; thence generally easterly along said railway to the southerly production of Dovercourt Road; thence northerly along said production and Dovercourt Road to Dundas Street West; thence easterly along said street to the point of commencement. '

== History ==
=== 2018 boundary adjustment ===
Toronto municipal ward boundaries were significantly modified in 2018 during the election campaign. Ultimately the new 25-ward structure was used and later upheld by the Supreme Court of Canada in 2021.

The current ward is made up of the southern parts of the old Ward 19 Trinity—Spadina, Ward 20 Trinity—Spadina, Ward 27 Toronto Centre—Rosedale and Ward 28 Toronto Centre—Rosedale.

=== 2018 municipal election ===
Ward 10 Spadina—Fort York was first contested during the 2018 municipal election with 14 candidates. Joe Cressy was ultimately elected with 55.06 per cent of the vote.

== Geography ==
Ward 10 is part of the Toronto and East York community council.

Spadina—Fort York's west boundary is Winona Drive, Ossington Avenue, Dundas Street and Davenport Road, and the east boundary is the Don River and the Port Lands neighbourhood. The north boundary is Dundas Street, Bay Street and The Esplanade, and the south boundary is Lake Ontario. The ward also comprises the Toronto Islands.

== Councillors ==
Council term	Member
	Ward 10 Spadina—Fort York
2018–2022	Joe Cressy
2018–2022	Joe Mihevc (2022)
2022–2026	Ausma Malik
2026–2030	Ausma Malik

== Election results ==
2026 Toronto municipal election

Candidate	Votes	%	minus
Ausma Malik (X)	21,975	47.29	10.74 ▲
Ian Cunningham	13,405	28.85	–
Xue Ding	3,767	8.11	–
Paul Nash	2,805	6.04	–
Andi Hoàng-Lefranc	2,113	4.55	–
Bashar Kassir	940	2.02	–
Aanchal Vashistha	930	2.00	–
Husain Neemuchwala	536	1.15	–

2022 Toronto municipal election

Candidate	Vote	%
Ausma Malik	8,033	36.55
April Engelberg	4,690	21.34
Rocco Achampong	1,906	8.67
Peter George	1,757	7.99
Igor Samardzic	1,686	7.67
Karlene Nation	1,001	4.55
Stephanie Soltermann	661	3.01
Arber Puci	603	2.74
Laura-Maria Nikolareizi	471	2.14
Kyle Enslen	439	2.00
Robb Cooke	434	1.97
Andrei Zodian	297	1.35

2018 Toronto municipal election, Ward 10 Spadina—Fort York
Candidate	Votes	Vote share
Joe Cressy	15,903	55.06%
April Engelberg	3,346	11.58%
Kevin Vuong	3,018	10.45%
Sabrina Zuniga	1,564	5.41%
John Nguyen	1,032	3.57%
Karlene Nation	860	2.98%
Rick Myers	747	2.59%
Dean Maher	611	2.12%
Al Carbone	519	1.80%
Andrew Massey	473	1.64%
Michael Barcelos	451	1.56%
Edris Zalmai	147	0.51%
Andrei Zodian	133	0.46%
Ahdam Dour	80	0.28%
Total	28,884	100%
Source: City of Toronto

== See also ==
- Municipal elections in Canada
- Municipal government of Toronto
- List of Toronto municipal elections
