= Rob Davis (politician) =

Canadian politician (born 1964)

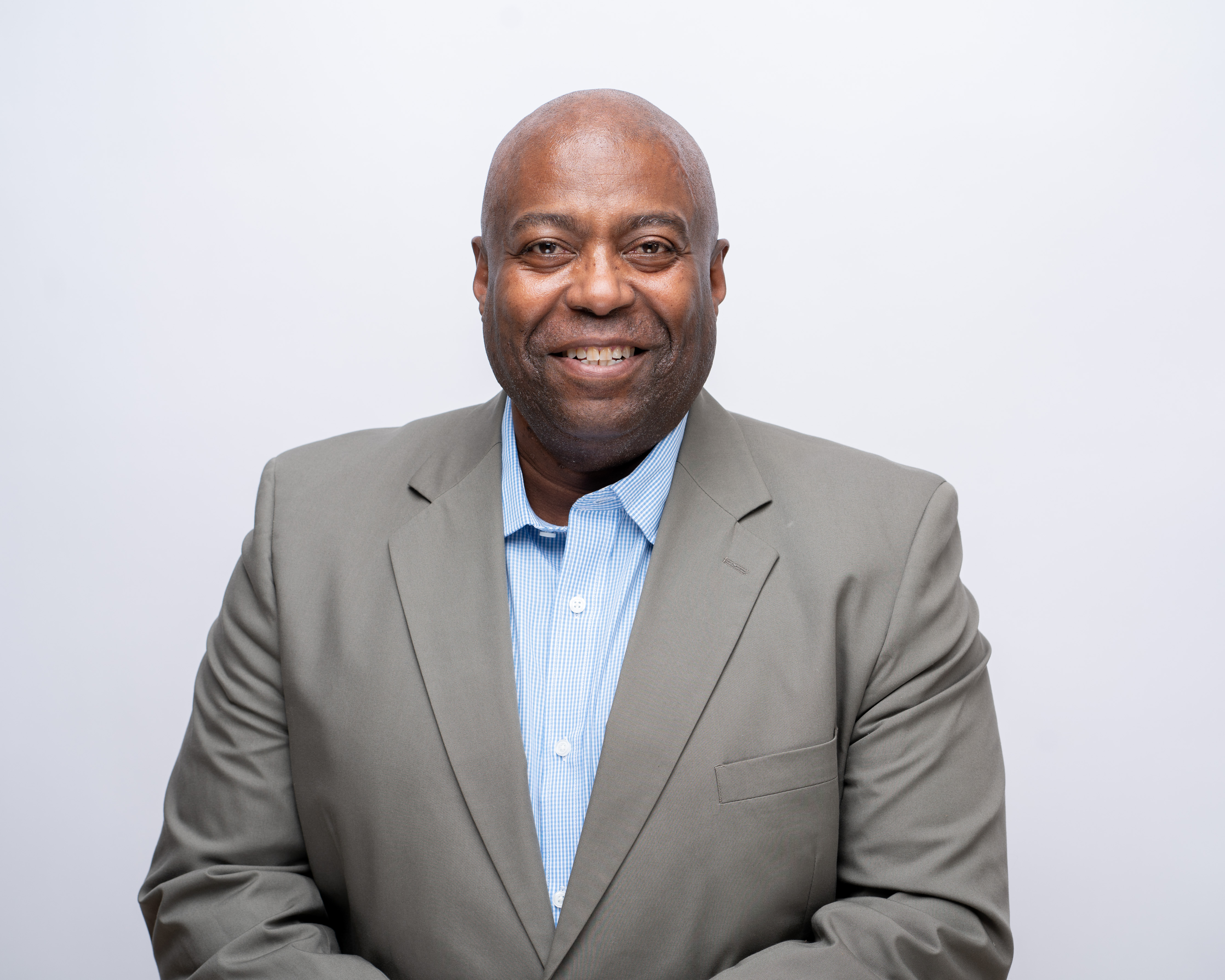

Toronto City Councillor for Ward 28 – York Eglinton
- In office 1997–2000
- Preceded by: Office created
- Succeeded by: Joe Mihevc

Vice Chair of the Toronto Transit Commission
- In office 1997–2000
- Mayor: Mel Lastman

York City Councillor
- In office 1991–1997
- Preceded by: Office abolished

Personal details
- Born: 1964 (age 61–62) Toronto, Ontario, Canada
- Party: Progressive Conservative Party
- Education: York University
- Occupation: Politician

Rob Davis (born 1964) is a Canadian politician. He served on the City of York council from 1991 to 1997. He was the first Black city councillor in the 200-year history of the City of York. He was elected as a member of the amalgamated Toronto City Council from 1997 to 2000. He was also the first Black city councillor of the amalgamated Toronto City Council.

In 2023, Davis unsuccessfully ran for mayor of Toronto.

== Life and career ==
Rob Davis was born and raised in Toronto, Ontario. Davis was Student Council President at St. Michael's College School, Toronto, 1982/3. He graduated from St. Michael's College in 1983, attended York University, and studied political science.

=== York City Council ===
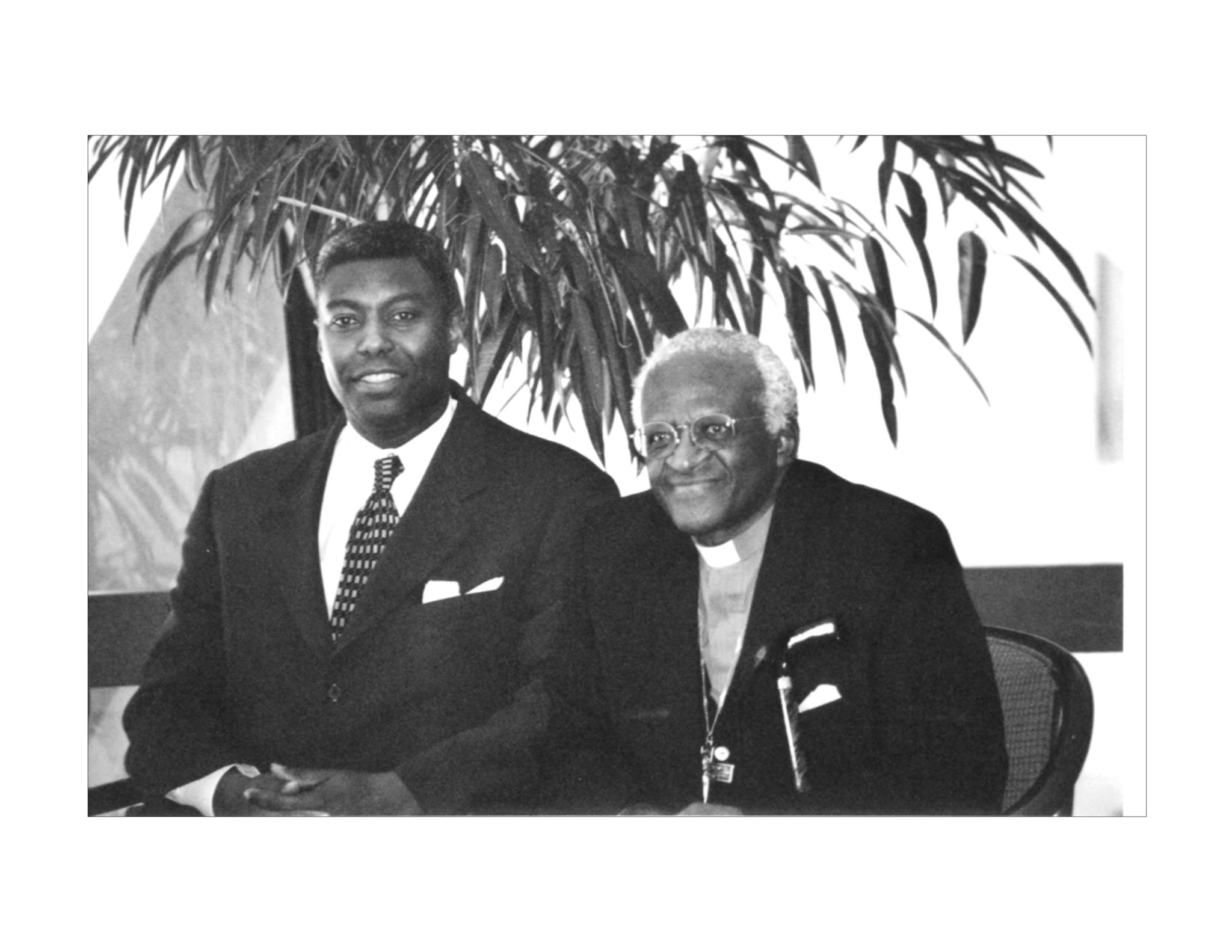

He was one of six new councillors elected for York in the 1991 municipal election, as city residents voted out a number of incumbents following the revelations of the Fairbank Park Scandal. At age 27, he became one of Ontario's youngest elected officials.

He was re-elected to the York council in the 1994 election. His council experience includes service on the Administrative Services Committee, the Works and Parks Committee, the boards of health, the Northwestern General Hospital, the York Library and the St. Clair Community Youth Services. Davis was the budget chief in 1997 in the City of York, and that year the city brought in a zero tax hike.

=== 1996 Ontario by-election ===
He campaigned for the Legislative Assembly of Ontario in a 1996 by-election in York South, as a candidate of the Progressive Conservative Party when New Democratic Party (NDP) leader Bob Rae vacated his seat. Davis defeated Zubair Chowdhry for the Progressive Conservative nomination and placed third in the election with 5,093 votes (25.69%). The winner was Gerard Kennedy, who shortly afterwards sought the leadership of the Liberals. City councillor David Miller finished second for the NDP.

=== Toronto City Council ===
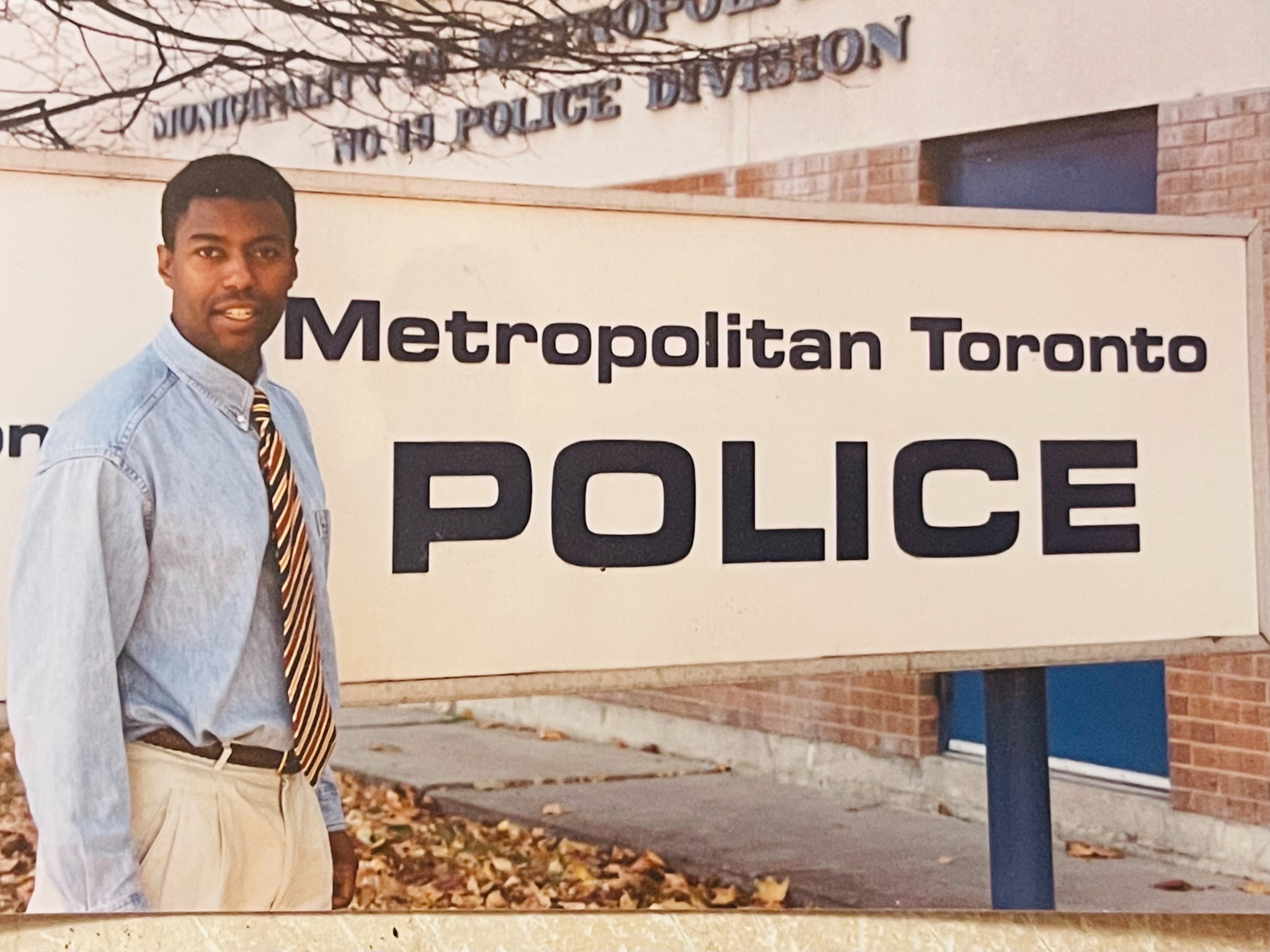

The City of York was amalgamated into the new City of Toronto in 1997, and Davis was elected to Toronto City Council in the 1997 election as one of two members for Ward 28. He served as chair of Toronto's crime prevention task force and, in 2000, was the driving force behind a gun buyback program which allocated fifty dollars to any city resident who surrendered a gun. He also served as vice-chair of the Toronto Transit Commission (TTC) from 1997 to 2000.

Davis was a right-wing councillor and an ally of mayor Mel Lastman. He sought to have Howard Moscoe removed as TTC chair in 1999. In 1998, Davis was one of 13 councillors to vote against same-sex benefits for city employees.

The wards in Toronto were redistributed before the 2000 election, and some sitting councillors were forced to face one another for re-election. Davis was defeated in Ward 21, losing to fellow councillor Joe Mihevc by over 3,500 votes following a very divisive contest. He sought to return to council in the 2003 campaign in Ward 33 in the eastern part of the former city of North York. Still, he was narrowly defeated by Shelley Carroll.

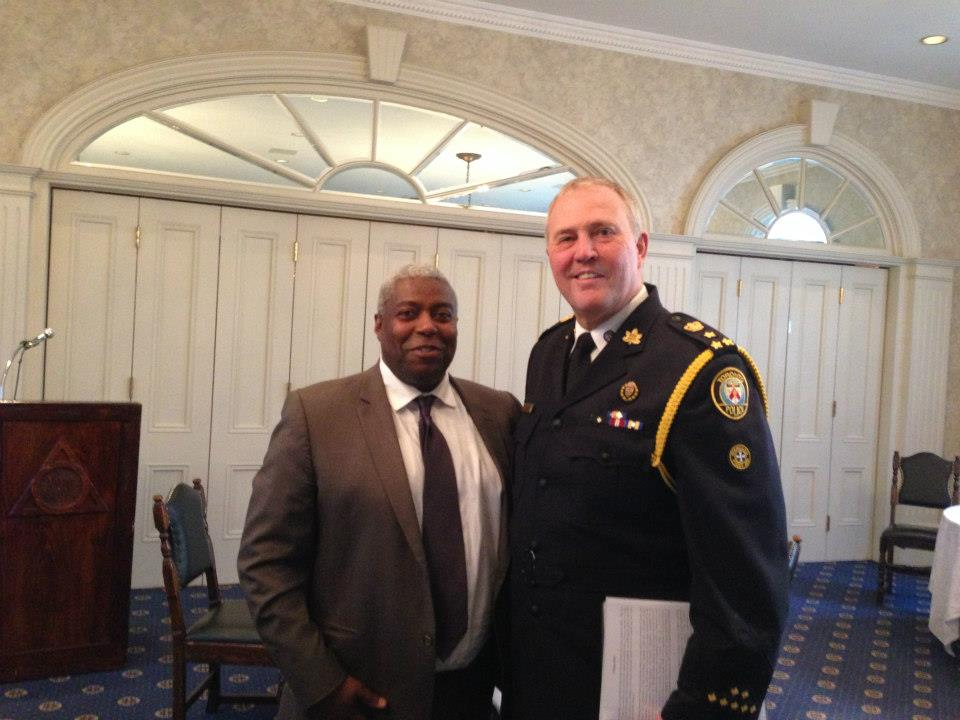

During the 2003 contest, Davis supported tenant advocacy, the restoration of rent control and gas tax financing for the TTC. Acknowledging that Progressive Conservative governments at the provincial level had opposed all three initiatives, he said, "I differed with my party."

He has worked as a consultant since leaving the council. In 2004, he organized a march supporting police chief Julian Fantino after it was announced that the deadlocked Toronto Police Services Board would not renew Fantino's contract.

In April 2008, he was appointed to replace trustee Christine Nunziata, who resigned due to allegations over her spending.

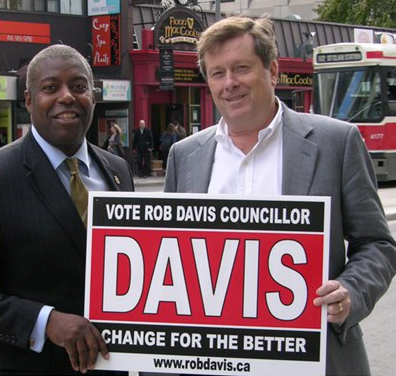

Davis was appointed to Ward 6 (York) of the Toronto Catholic District School Board to replace Christine Nunziata, who was removed for missing three consecutive board meetings, on May 8, 2010. Immediately after his appointment, Davis said there needed to be an "infrastructure of integrity" in place before the Trustees could restore parent confidence and move on from the Trustee spending scandal. His first motion as trustee was to call upon the board to create an integrity commissioner position at their next meeting on May 14, 2010.

In the 2010 municipal election, Davis ran unsuccessfully for Toronto City Council from Ward 15 in an attempt to replace Howard Moscoe.

In 2023, Davis ran for mayor of Toronto, ending up in 22nd place.

== Election results ==
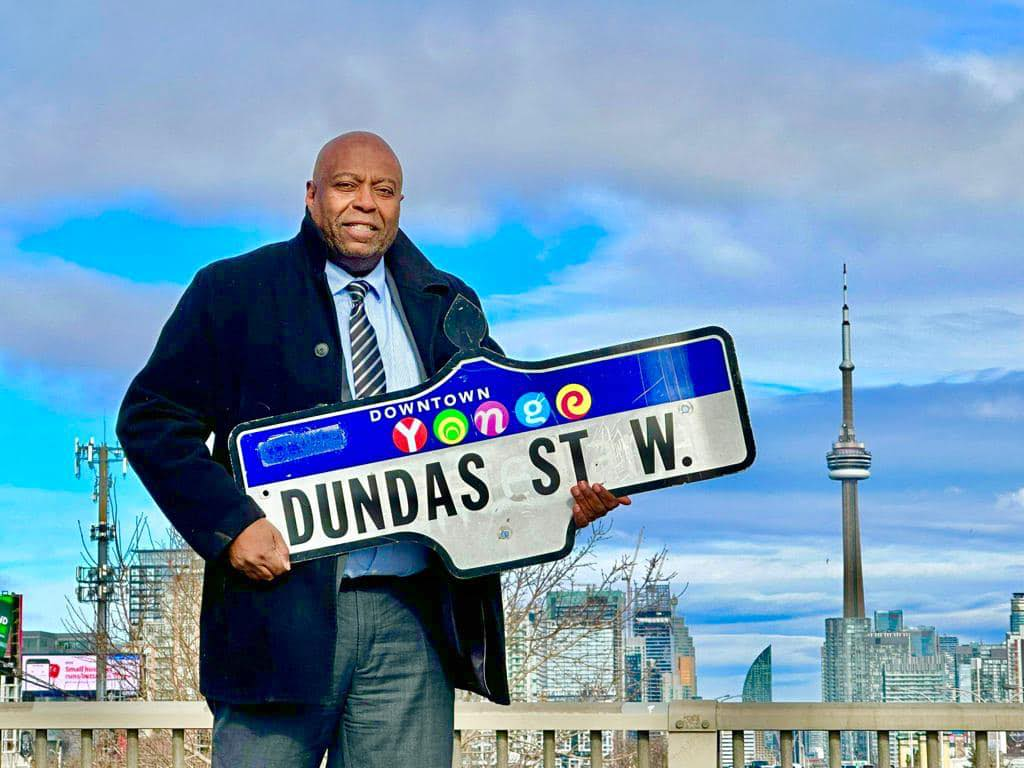

1991 York Election Ward 3
Candidate	Votes	%
Rob Davis (Elected)	859	23.13%
Angela Bianci	625	16.83%
Theo Evdoxiadis	475	12.79%
Mario Giansante	422	11.37%
Roland Saggiorato	402	10.83%
Gabriel Graziano	290	7.81%
Jose Perez	209	5.63%
Suzana Dozsa	178	4.79%
Leroy Crosse	152	4.09%
Tony Pizzolato	101	2.72%
Total Votes	3,713	100.00%

Source: 1991 Toronto municipal election

1994 York Election Ward 3
Candidate	%
Rob Davis (Elected)	45.20%

Source: 1994 Toronto municipal election

1996 Ontario Provincial By-Election York South
Party	Candidate	Votes	%
Liberal (Elected)	Gerard Kennedy	7,774	39.22
New Democratic	David Miller	6,656	33.58
Progressive Conservative	Rob Davis	5,093	25.69
Independent	David Milne	151	0.76
Libertarian	George Dance	77	0.39
Independent	Kevin Clarke	70	0.35
Total valid votes		19,821	100
Rejected, unmarked and declined ballots		264	
Turnout		20,085	51.38
Electors on the lists		39,092	

Source: Ontario provincial by-election, May 23, 1996/York South

1997 Toronto Election Ward 28 - York Eglinton
Candidate	Votes	%
Joe Mihevc (Elected)	7,548	24.57%
Rob Davis (Elected)	6,660	21.68%
Caroline DiGiovanni	5,989	19.49%
Tony Rizzo	5,538	18.02%
Joan Roberts	4,077	13.27%
Chai Kalevar	912	2.97%
Total	30,724	100%

***Top 2 elected****

Source: 1997 Toronto municipal election

2000 Toronto Election Ward 21 St Paul's
Candidate	Votes	%
(incumbent) Joe Mihevc (Elected)	9,636	60.47%
(incumbent) Rob Davis	5,989	37.58%
Chai Kalevar	311	1.95%
Total Votes	15,936	100%

Source: 2000 Toronto municipal election

2003 Toronto Election Ward 33 - Don Valley East
Candidate	Votes	%
Shelley Carroll (Elected)	4,744	36.6
Rob Davis	3,923	30.2
Aris Babikian	1,757	13.5
Wayne Habib	1,164	9
Jim Conlon	675	5.2
Allan Ginsberg	287	2.2
Asad Alam	232	1.8
Ari Maounis	191	1.5
Total Votes	12,973	100%

Source: 2003 Toronto municipal election

2010 Toronto Election Ward 15 -Eglinton Lawrence
Candidate	Votes	%
Josh Colle (Elected)	6,668	40.38%
Rob Davis	5,399	32.69%
Ron Singer	2,275	13.78%
Tony Evangelista	1,173	7.10%
Giuseppe Pede	472	2.86%
Eva Tavares	464	2.81%
William Reitsma	64	0.39%
Total	16,515	100%

Source: 2010 Toronto municipal election
