= Joe Mihevc =

Canadian politician (born 1954)

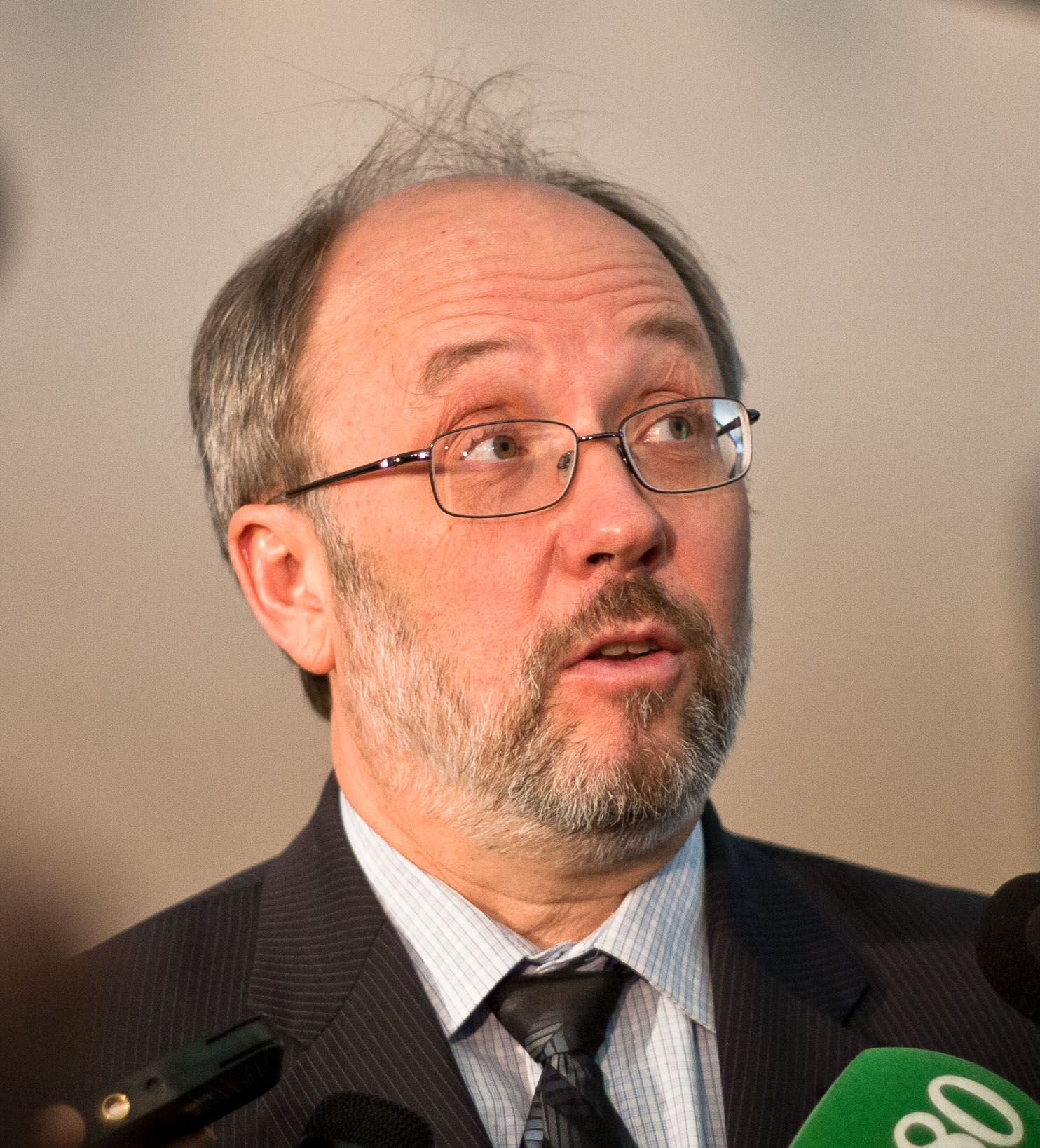
- Mihevc in 2012

Toronto City Councillor for Ward 10 Spadina—Fort York
- In office June 1, 2022 – November 14, 2022
- Preceded by: Joe Cressy
- Succeeded by: Ausma Malik

Toronto City Councillor for Ward 21 St. Paul's
- In office December 1, 2000 – December 1, 2018
- Preceded by: Ward created
- Succeeded by: Ward dissolved

Toronto City Councillor for Ward 28 York Eglinton
- In office January 1, 1998 – November 30, 2000 Serving with Rob Davis
- Preceded by: Ward created
- Succeeded by: Ward abolished

York City Councillor for Ward 2
- In office December 1, 1991 – December 31, 1997
- Preceded by: Tony Mandarano
- Succeeded by: City amalgamated

Personal details
- Born: February 24, 1954 (age 72) Toronto, Ontario, Canada
- Spouse: Rosalee Bender
- Children: 3
- Education: University of Toronto
- Occupation: Politician; adjunct lecturer

Joe Mihevc (/mɪˈhɛvɪk/ mi-HEV-ik; born February 24, 1954) is a Canadian politician who was appointed to represent Ward 10 Spadina—Fort York on Toronto City Council on June 1, 2022. He was previously elected to represent Ward 21 St. Paul's from 2000 to 2018, Ward 28 York Eglinton from 1998 to 2000 and was a York City Councillor from 1991 to 1997.

== Background ==
Mihevc's family is originally from a small village in Slovenia. They arrived in Canada in 1948 as refugees. Mihevc grew up in Toronto districts of Dufferin and Eglinton, a working class area that borders the northwest corner of his ward. Raised Catholic, Mihevc obtained a PhD in theology and became an adjunct professor of ethics at the University of Toronto.

== Political career ==
He first ran for office in 1991 in the old City of York, and defeated incumbent Tony Mandarano, who had been facing corruption charges. Backed by the New Democratic Party, he rose to the position of deputy mayor of York.

Following the amalgamation of York with five other Metropolitan Toronto municipalities, which he had opposed, Mihevc was elected to the new Toronto city council. In 2000, redistricting resulted in an election battle with the conservative councillor Rob Davis. The election was marred by an anonymous telephone campaign that painted Mihevc as anti-Semitic. Mayor of Toronto Mel Lastman endorsed Davis.

He was chair of Toronto's World Youth Day, and from 2000 to 2003 was chair of the health board. He was in that position during the 2003 SARS outbreak. He also was instrumental in forcing through a ban on the use of lawn pesticides.

Mihevc has been a long-time member of the Toronto Transit Commission and served as Vice-Chair from 2006 to 2010. He supported the St. Clair Avenue streetcar right-of-way. The $100 million investment in new streetcar lanes, hydro undergrounding, new gas lines, and public realm improvements has led to a rejuvenation of the St. Clair West neighbourhood.

Construction was delayed by a failed lawsuit by a group of local residents. A report by a consultant for the TTC, which Councillor Mihevc had commissioned, found numerous faults with the project, among them a lack of centralized project management. This led to a number of changes to construction management protocols.

Despite a high-profile challenge from former pre-amalgamation Toronto mayor John Sewell, Mihevc was easily re-elected to city council in the 2006 election.

Mihevc was re-elected by a substantial margin in November 2010, earning nearly 10,000 of the 17,500 votes cast and approximately 56% of the ward's popular vote.

Mihevc was the chair of the Board of Health, a TTC Commissioner, and sat on the Community Development and Recreation Committee and the Tenant Issues Committee. He was appointed Newcomer Advocate along with Joe Cressy in December 2015.

Following the resignation of Joe Cressy in ward 10, Mihevc was appointed to his seat for the remainder of term council term on June 1, 2022. On June 20, 2022, Mihevc once again became chair of the Board of Health.

== Election results ==
2018 Toronto municipal election, Ward 12 Toronto—St. Paul's
| Candidate | Votes | Vote share |
| Josh Matlow | 20,371 | 51.60% |
| Joe Mihevc | 16,634 | 42.14% |
| Ian Lipton | 930 | 2.36% |
| Elizabeth Cook | 908 | 2.3% |
| Bob Murphy | 342 | 0.87% |
| Artur Langu | 290 | 0.73% |
| Total | 39,475 | 100% |
Source: City of Toronto

2014 Toronto election, Ward 21
| Candidate | Votes | % |
| Joe Mihevc | 15,745 | 76.9 |
| Ted Bustamante | 1,766 | 8.6 |
| Cos Licursi | 1,728 | 8.4 |
| Rosina Bonavota | 1,223 | 6.0 |
| Total | 20,462 | 100 |

2010 Toronto election, Ward 21
| Candidate | Votes | % |
| Joe Mihevc | 9,824 | 56.2 |
| Shimmy Posen | 5,328 | 30.5 |
| Peter Nolan | 921 | 5.3 |
| Beth McLellan | 644 | 3.7 |
| Alex Freedman | 454 | 2.6 |
| Marius Frederick | 295 | 1.7 |
| Total | 17,466 | 100 |

2006 Toronto election, Ward 21
| Candidate | Votes | % |
| Joe Mihevc | 8,092 | 56.7 |
| John Sewell | 3,326 | 23.3 |
| John Adams | 2,712 | 19.0 |
| Tony Corpuz | 150 | 1.1 |

2003 Toronto election, Ward 21
| Candidate | Votes | % |
| (incumbent) Joe Mihevc | 10,875 | 65.63 |
| George Milne | 3,809 | 22.98 |
| Howard Levine | 1,089 | 6.57 |
| Maya Tarom | 522 | 3.15 |
| Gregory Moskos | 167 | 1.00 |
| Tony Corpuz | 107 | 0.64 |
