= Jury stress =

Physical and mental tension affecting juries

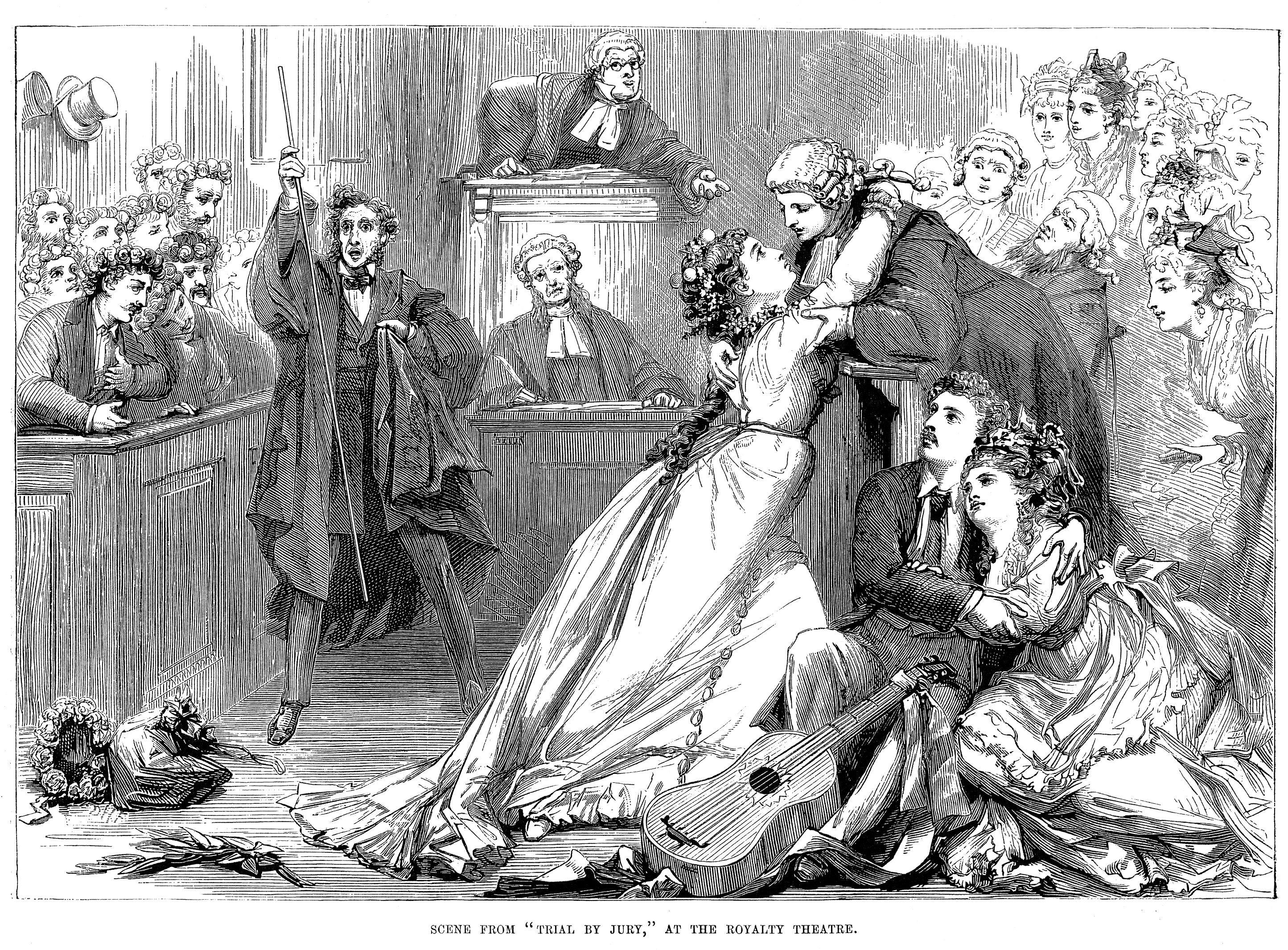
Engraving based on Trial by Jury, Gilbert and Sullivan opera

Jury stress or juror stress is physical and mental tension that affects members of juries. Its causes include "exhaustion, sequestration, the mountain of evidence, and the desire to do the right thing".

Jury stress can come as a result of seeing or hearing disturbing evidence. In the cases of murder or sexual crimes, evidence can be explicit causing potential harm to the jury. Jurors can also feel a 'burden of responsibility' – they hold large amounts of power over someone else's life and the possibility of imprisonment or a fine for that person. Jury stress can in some cases lead to symptoms of post-traumatic stress disorder and increased anxiety, depression or physical symptoms such as an increase in blood pressure or nausea.
