= Litigation stress =

Litigation stress refers to negative mental health consequences (psychological stress) associated with judicial proceedings.

Some related issues caused by litigation stress include privacy concerns, adversarialization and psychological trauma.

Parties particularly vulnerable to litigation stress include those with existing health issues, parties alleging sexual assault or harassment, parties in cases involving family conflict and parties in cases involving medical malpractice. In the latter context, this topic is sometimes known as the medical malpractice stress syndrome (MMSS).

== See also ==
- Abuse of process
- Moral injury
