= Government of Ontario =

Canadian provincial government

Government of Ontario Gouvernement de l'Ontario
- Provincial government

Overview
- Established: 1 July 1867; 159 years ago
- Country: Canada
- Polity: Province
- Leader: Premier; Doug Ford
- Appointed by: Lieutenant Governor; Edith Dumont
- Main organ: Executive Council
- Responsible to: Legislative Assembly
- Headquarters: Toronto
- Website: www.ontario.ca

The Government of Ontario (French: Gouvernement de l'Ontario), or more formally, His Majesty's Government of Ontario (French: Gouvernement de l’Ontario de Sa Majesté) is the subnational government in the Canadian province of Ontario responsible for the administration of matters within provincial jurisdiction, as assigned by the Constitution Act, 1867.

Depending context, the term Government of Ontario in day-to-day communication usually refers specifically to one of the following:

- The Executive Council of Ontario, more colloquially known as the Ontario cabinet, a group of political ministers of the Crown led by and appointed on the advice of the premier, drawn from the parliamentary caucus of the provincial political party commanding the confidence of and accountable to the Legislative Assembly of Ontario
- The Ontario Public Service, the functional workforce of more than 60,000 non-partisan civil servants in various ministries and agencies responsible for the execution of the policy decisions of the cabinet and for the delivery of programs and services that of public interest. The entire organization corporately brands itself as the Government of Ontario
- Queen's Park, the moniker commonly used to refer to the Legislative Assembly of Ontario due to its location in said park. Members of the executive council are drawn from the elected members of this legislative body, and the premier must command the support of the majority of its elected members on an ongoing basis to remain in office.

== Role of the Crown ==
As a Westminster-style parliamentary democracy, the Ontario Government draws its formal legal authority from the constitutional construct of the monarchy. Government authority is exercised in the name of the monarch, King Charles III, which is expressed as His Majesty the King in Right of Ontario.

As a Commonwealth realm, the Canadian monarch is shared with 14 other independent countries within the Commonwealth of Nations. Within Canada, the monarch exercises power individually on behalf of the federal government, and each of the 10 provinces.

The powers of the Crown are vested in the monarch and are exercised in the name of the lieutenant governor of Ontario, who is appointed by the governor general, on the advice of the prime minister of Canada. Formally speaking, executive power is vested in the Crown and exercised "in-Council", meaning the premier and ministers forming the Executive Council advise the lieutenant governor in exercising the royal prerogative and granting royal assent. In reality, the lieutenant governor can be appropriately described as the ceremonial figure head of the government. The Constitution Act, 1867, requires executive power to be exercised only "by and with the Advice of the Executive Council" and Westminster convention dictates that the advice of the executive commanding the confidence of parliament, in this case the elected Legislative Assembly on Ontario, is binding on the crown. The lieutenant governor may only refuse advice if the executive or the premier does not clearly command such confidence, likely in a scenario of a constitutional crisis.

== Premier and Executive Council ==
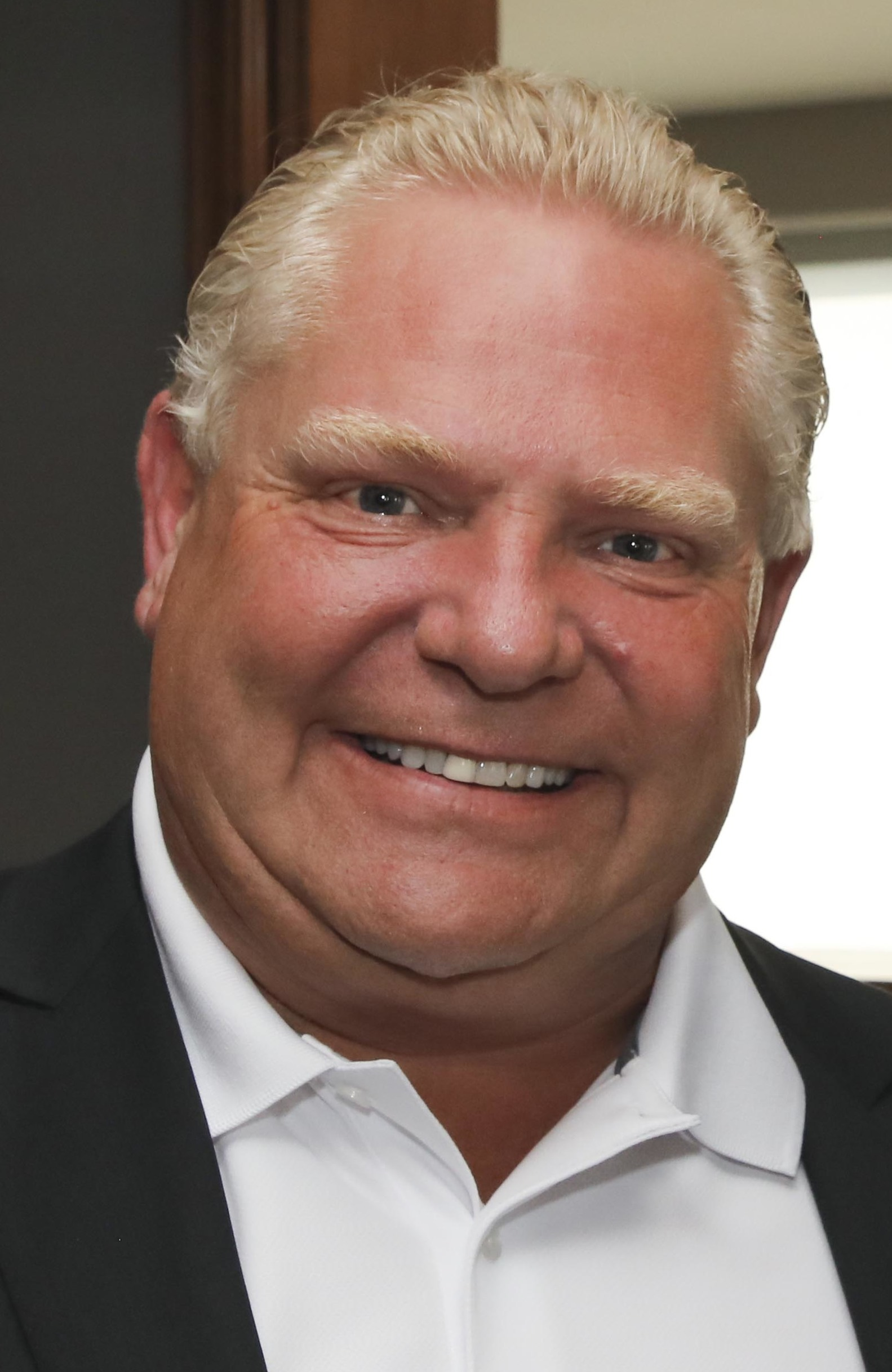
Doug Ford is Premier

The term Government of Ontario, in the context of the executive leadership of the provincial administration, refers to the premier on Ontario, as determine through the electoral process, and the cabinet they select and head. Currently, the government is led by Progressive Conservative Premier Doug Ford, who received his first electoral mandate and assumed the Ontario premiership in June 2018, and was most recently reelected in February 2025.

The executive government, with electoral mandate, directs the non-partisan Ontario Public Service, a workforce of more than 60,000 that staffs the numerous provincial departments, agencies. and crown corporations and perform the day-to-day operation and activities of the Government of Ontario

=== Premier ===
The premier of Ontario is the first minister of the Crown. The premier acts as the head of government for the province, chairs and selects the membership of the Cabinet, and advises the Crown on the exercise of executive power and much of the royal prerogative. As premiers hold office by virtue of their ability to command the confidence of the elected Legislative Assembly, they typically sit as a MPP and lead the largest party or a coalition in the Assembly. Once sworn in, the premier holds office until their resignation or removal by the lieutenant governor after either a motion of no confidence or defeat in a general election.

=== Cabinet membership ===
In Canada, the Cabinet (French: Conseil des ministres, lit. 'council of ministers') of provincial and territorial governments are known as an Executive Council (French: Conseil exécutif).

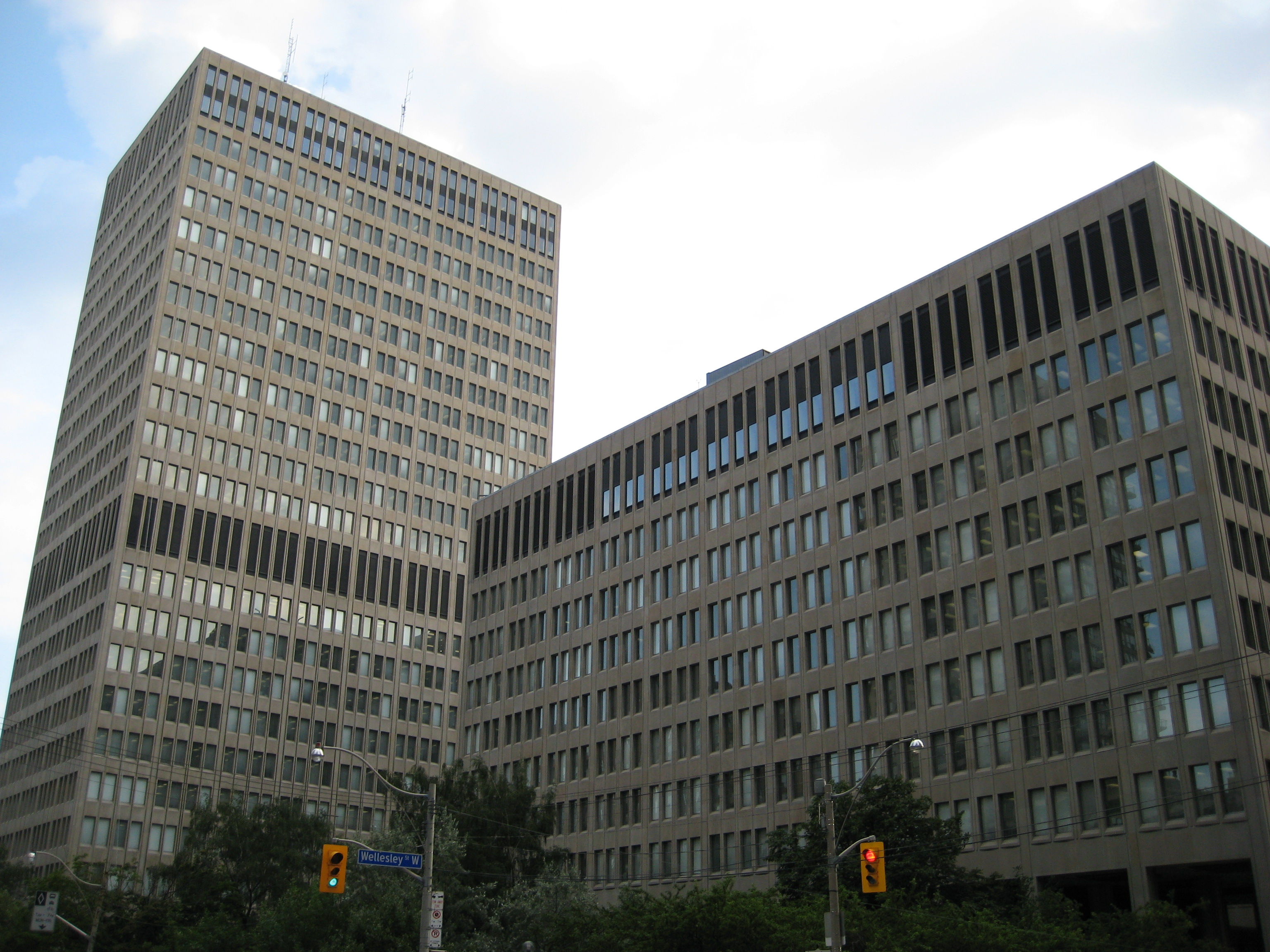
The Ontario Government Buildings in downtown Toronto contain the head offices of several provincial ministries.

Doug Ford and his Cabinet were sworn in by Lieutenant Governor Elizabeth Dowdeswell on June 29, 2018, following the 2018 general election. Ford conducted six major cabinet shuffles (with substantial numbers of ministers changing roles) since 2018 and 7 minor adjustments (triggered by resignations and impacted small numbers of ministers).

The current composition of the Ford ministry was largely set in the post-election shuffle on March 19, 2025. With 37 members since August 2024, it is the largest cabinet in Ontario history by a substantial margin. Ford carry out a further shuffle on September 10, 2026, assinging new duties to six incumbent minister and promoting three new member into cabinet.

Explanatory notes: Assumed office and Joined Cabinet: contain years correspond to the major cabinet shuffles that took place on the follow date, unless otherwise noted.

During 42nd Parliament
- June 29, 2018
- June 20, 2019
- June 18, 2021
During 43rd Parliament
- June 24, 2022
- September 4, 2023
- June 6, 2024
During 44th Parliament (current)
- March 19, 2025
- September 10, 2026

Ordering: Per Ministry of Intergovernmental Affairs' Ontario order of precedence, members of the council are to be ordered "in accordance with the precedence document issued by the Cabinet Office", but no such documents is currently made public. Previous version of the document follow ordering similar to that in the Table of Precedence of Canada, primarily by the date a member first joined council, followed by the date of their first election to the legislature. This table is ordered as such.)

Minister	Portfolio	Assumed office	Joined cabinet	First elected
Doug Ford	Premier & President of the Council	2018	2018	2018
Doug Ford	Minister of Intergovernmental Affairs	2018	2018	2018
Sylvia Jones	Deputy Premier; Minister of Health	2022	2018	2007
Vic Fedeli	Chair of Cabinet	2018	2018	2011
Vic Fedeli	Minister of Economic Development, Job Creation and Trade	2019	2018	2011
Lisa Thompson	Minister of Rural Affairs	2021	2018	2011
Raymond Cho	Minister for Seniors and Accessibility	2018	2018	2016 (Note: Won in a by-election.)
Peter Bethlenfalvy	Minister of Finance	2020 (Note: December 31, 2020, following the resignation of Rod Phillips.)	2018	2018
Greg Rickford	Minister of Indigenous Affairs and First Nations Economic Reconciliation	2018	2018	2018 (Note: Previously served in the House of Commons from 2008 to 2015.)
Greg Rickford	Minister Responsible for Ring of Fire Economic and Community Partnerships	2025	2018	2018
Doug Downey	Attorney General	2019	2019	2018
Paul Calandra	Minister of Education	2025	2019	2018
Jill Dunlop	Minister of Emergency Preparedness and Response	2025	2019	2018
Stephen Lecce	Minister of Energy and Mines	2025	2019	2018
Prabmeet Sarkaria	Minister of Transportation	2023	2019	2018
Kinga Surma	President of the Treasury Board	2026	2019	2018
David Piccini	Minister of Infrastructure	2026	2021	2018
Michael Parsa	Minister of Children, Community and Social Services	2023 (Note: March 24, 2023, following the resignation of Merrilee Fullerton.)	2022	2018
Michael Kerzner	Solicitor General of Ontario	2022	2022	2022
George Pirie	Minister of Northern Economic Development and Growth	2025	2022	2022
Trevor Jones	Minister of Labour, Immigration, Training and Skills Development	2026	2024	2022
Rob Flack	Minister of Municipal Affairs and Housing	2025	2023	2022
Todd McCarthy	Minister of the Environment, Conservation and Parks	2025	2023	2022
Andrea Khanjin	Minister of Red Tape Reduction	2025	2023 (Note: September 22, 2023, following the resignation of Monte McNaughton.)	2018
Stephen Crawford	Minister of Public and Business Service Delivery and Procurement	2025	2024	2018
Mike Harris Jr.	Minister of Natural Resources	2025	2024	2018
Natalia Kusendova-Bashta	Minister of Long-Term Care	2024	2024	2018
Natalia Kusendova-Bashta	Minister of Francophone Affairs	2026	2024	2018
Nolan Quinn	Minister of Colleges, Universities, Research Excellence and Security	2025	2024	2022
Sam Oosterhoff	Minister of Agriculture, Food and Agribusiness	2026	2024	2016
Graham McGregor	Minister of Citizenship and Multiculturalism	2025	2024 (Note: August 16, 2024, following the resignation of Todd Smith.)	2022
Michael Tibollo	Associate Attorney General	2025	2018	2018
Nina Tangri	Associate Minister of Small Business	2023	2021	2018
Charmaine Williams	Associate Minister of Women’s Social and Economic Opportunity	2022	2022	2022
Graydon Smith	Associate Minister of Municipal Affairs and Housing	2025	2022	2022
Vijay Thanigasalam	Associate Minister of Artificial Intelligence Adoption	2026	2023	2018
Kevin Holland	Associate Minister of Forestry and Forest Products	2025	2024	2022
Zee Hamid	Minister of Tourism, Culture and Gaming	2026	2025	2024
Brian Saunderson	Minister of Sport	2026	2026	2022
Matthew Rae	Associate Minister of Energy-Intensive Industries	2026	2026	2022
Michelle Cooper	Associate Minister of Mental Health and Addictions	2026	2026	2025

== Ontario Public Service ==
The Government of Ontario employs 63,000+ public servants in its non-partisan workforce called the Ontario Public Service (OPS). The OPS helps the government design and deliver policies and programs. The head of the OPS is the Secretary of Cabinet and each ministry in the OPS has a Deputy Minister. The OPS public servants work in areas like administration, communications, data analytics, finance, information technology, law, policy, program development, service delivery, science and research.

Over 80% of the OPS workforce is unionized, which includes the Ontario Public Service Employees Union and the Association of Management, Administrative and Professional Crown Employees of Ontario.

The Government of Ontario is not the same as Broader Public Sector (BPS) organizations. While both provide goods and services to Ontarians, BPS organizations receive funding from the Government of Ontario, but are not a part of the government themselves. BPS organizations are also subject to legislation and directives.

Public servants who are paid $100,000 or more are subject to the Public Sector Salary Disclosure Act. This list is colloquially known as the sunshine list.

== See also ==
- Politics of Ontario
- Lieutenant Governor of Ontario
- Premier of Ontario
- Legislative Assembly of Ontario
- Executive Council of Ontario
