= Pan-Canadian Pharmaceutical Alliance =

The pan-Canadian Pharmaceutical Alliance (PCPA, stylized as pCPA), previously the Pan-Canadian Pricing Alliance and the Generic Value Price Initiative is an alliance between the provinces and territories of Canada to combine their bargaining power to negotiate lower prices on pharmaceutical drugs.

== History ==
Support for inter-provincial coordination on price negotiations for pharmaceuticals began in August 2010 after a meeting of provincial premiers. The pCPA initially comprised nine provinces and Yukon, with Quebec joining in 2014. As of 2023, all provinces and territories are members of the Alliance.

The pCPA conducted negotiations for prices on ten drugs in its first three years, including for eculizumab, and estimated it had saved approximately $50,000,000.
