= Milton Harris =

Milton Harris may refer to:

- Milton Harris (professor), American economist at The University of Chicago Booth School of Business
- Milton Harris (scientist) (1906–1991), founder of the Harris Research Laboratories and former chairman of the National Academy of Sciences Board of Directors
- Milton E. Harris (1927–2005), Canadian businessman and founder of the Harris Steel Group
