= David Zimmer =

Canadian politician

The Honourable David Zimmer ECO
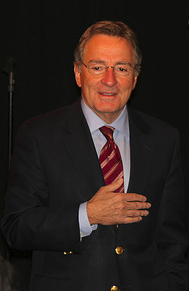
- Zimmer in 2010

Member of the Ontario Provincial Parliament for Willowdale
- In office October 2, 2003 – June 7, 2018
- Preceded by: David Young
- Succeeded by: Stan Cho

Personal details
- Born: April 7, 1944 (age 82) Kitchener, Ontario, Canada
- Party: Ontario Liberal (since 1985)
- Other political affiliations: Ontario PC (until 1985)
- Profession: Lawyer

David Zimmer ECO (born April 7, 1944) is a former politician in Canada who represented the electoral district of Willowdale in the Legislative Assembly of Ontario from 2003 to 2018. A member of the Ontario Liberal Party, he served in the cabinet of Premier Kathleen Wynne as Minister of Aboriginal Affairs (restyled Minister of Indigenous Relations and Reconciliation in 2016) for the full five years and four months length of the Wynne ministry.

== Background ==
Born in Kitchener, Ontario, Zimmer attended University of Ottawa Law School and was called to the Bar of Ontario. He practised law at Ledrew Laishley Reed in Toronto, and served as an administrative law instructor in the Law Society of Upper Canada's bar admission course.

In 1994, Zimmer was appointed by the federal government to the Immigration and Refugee Board of Canada as its assistant deputy chairman heading the Toronto office, and was shortlisted for the national chairmanship in 1999. In 2001, he was appointed chairperson of Toronto's public housing provider, the Toronto Community Housing Corporation. He was Director of the Humane Society from 1982 to 1984, and from 1993 to 1995 was President of the Alzheimer Society of Canada.

== Political career ==
=== Early involvement ===
Zimmer first sought elected office as an alderman in Kitchener in the 1970s but was not successful. While living in Kitchener, he was active in the Progressive Conservative Party of Ontario (PC). He served as president of the PC's Kitchener—Wilmot riding association upon its creation in 1975, and managed the 1981 campaign for the local PC candidate Alan Barron. He left the PC Party and joined the Liberals in 1985, citing disenchantment with both federal leader Brian Mulroney and provincial leader Frank Miller.

Zimmer acted as legal counsel to candidates of both the federal and provincial Liberals in a number of high-profile dispute prior to his election. He was legal counsel for Maurizio Bevilacqua in the two year saga following his 1988 election, where the close results were extensively contested in court and was eventually voided by the Ontario Supreme Court. He also chaired the federal party's permanent appeal committee, overseeing numerous appeals during the 1990 leadership contest and from nomination contests prior to the party's victory in 1993.

=== Member of Provincial Parliament for Willowdale ===
In the 2003 Ontario provincial election, Zimmer ran as the Liberal candidate in the riding of Willowdale, defeating PC incumbent and sitting Minister of Municipal Affairs David Young by 1,866 votes. The contest, billed in the press as "the battle of the Davids", was considered a key race to watch given Young's profile as a possible future PC leader and Willowdale's long history of being represented by prominent PC ministers. Willowdale was where the PC came the closest to retaining a seat within the City of Toronto in 2003. Despite the competitive contest, Zimmer maintained cordial relations with Young and Young's predecessor Charles Harnick, both predecessors to Zimmer not only as MPP for Willowdale but also as Ministers of Aboriginal Affairs in the Progressive Conservative Ministry of Mike Harris. Zimmer fended off a challenge by high-profile local councillor David Shiner in 2007, and was re-elected again 2011, and 2014, increasing his share of vote and margin of victory each time.

Between 2003 and 2011, Zimmer served as Parliamentary Assistant to Attorneys General Michael Bryant and Chris Bentley. Between 2011 and 2013, Zimmer served as Parliamentary Assistant to Kathleen Wynne, then Minister of Municipal Affairs and Housing and Minister of Aboriginal Affairs. He was a member of the Standing Committee on Public Accounts (2003–06, 2007–11, 2012), Standing Committee on Estimates (2006–07), Standing Committee on Justice Policy (2006–11), Standing Committee on General Government (2012), Select Committee on Elections (2008–09), and Select Committee on the proposed transaction of the TMX Group and the London Stock Exchange Group (2011).

In 2004, his motion to create an "Elder Abuse Awareness Day" was passed with support from all parties. He also assisted former Ontario Attorney General Michael Bryant with legislation to ban pit bulls in Ontario. In 2006, he sponsored a Private Member's Bill which will suspend the driver's license of anyone who is convicted of impaired boating. It passed with unanimous consent of all parties in the Ontario Legislature.

He was awarded the Greatest Local Hero Award by the North York Town Crier for his volunteer and community work in Willowdale. In 2005, he received a "Social Work Doctors’ Colloquium" Award of Merit for his work toward a just and caring society. He has also been cited for work on Ontario Municipal Board reform and the new City of Toronto Act, which gives Toronto greater power to manage its own affairs.

Zimmer endorsed Kathleen Wynne during Ontario Liberal Party's 2012-13 leadership election. He was among the first four caucus supporters of Wynne's candidacy along with Linda Jeffrey, Reza Moridi and Mario Sergio, declaring their support at Wynne's campaign launch on November 5, 2012.

=== Minister tasked with indigenous relations & reconciliation ===
In February 2013, Zimmer, who was Premier Kathleen Wynne's parliamentary assistant in the Ministry of Aboriginal Affairs, was appointed by Wynne as the Minister of Aboriginal Affairs. Zimmer helmed the ministry, the second smallest in the government, (Note: by headcount and by budget (larger only than Francophone Affairs)) during a period indigenous issues increasingly became a front burner, mainstream area of political discourse, rapidly gaining awareness among the voting public and unprecedent attention from the Ontario government led by Wynne and the federal administration of Liberal Prime Minister Justin Trudeau. Under Zimmer's watch, the indigenous affairs ministry was thrusted into roles with much greater prominence and sensitivities while substantially expanded its scope in many of the government's economic policy initiatives.

Wynne placing importance on indigenous issues as both a cross-government priority and a personal priority, and her personal affinity with Zimmer for being one of her earliest backers, were among the key enablers Zimmer's and his ministry's success in securing significant, in some cases unprecedented, progress on many longstanding challenges. For most of his tenure, the ministry's most senior civil servant and its chief political advisor (Note: Respectively the Deputy Minister and Chief of Staff.) were both long-time associates of Wynne. Zimmer oversaw Ontario's response to the Truth and Reconciliation Commission, including a $250 million special investment package, close to twice the ministry's annual budget, on an integrated suite of education, health, cultural and social services programs focused on reconciliation and addressing the legacy and negative impacts of residential schools. As part of Ontario's response, in June 2016, his ministerial title was renamed to Minister of Indigenous Relations and Reconciliation, a move later reversed when the Liberals were ousted from government.

Zimmer placed specific focus on the indigenous relationship aspect of his role. He was determined to personally visit as many of Ontario's First Nation Communities as possible, including remote reserves in extremely poor conditions that are difficult to reach. His long tenure as a minister with a standalone mandate meant he was able to personally represent the government in the home communities of his stakeholders. By the end of his tenure, he personally visited 129 of Ontario's 133 First Nations.

Zimmer held the record as Ontario's longest serving minister for indigenous affairs until late 2023 when his successor Greg Rickford, who held the role as supplementary to various economic portfolios during different periods surpassed his record of 5 years and 4 months. Zimmer's tenure was the longest continuous period during which the ministry had a dedicated minister at the cabinet table. (Note: Previously Brad Duguid led the ministry solely for 16 months.) His successor Rickford at the height of his power was charged with leading natural resources, forestry, northern development, mines, and energy in addition to the indigenous ministry. Despite heading the most bloated cabinet in the province's history, with six ministers minding those same resources portfolio in late 2024, Premier Ford never appointed a full time minister to the indigenous affairs ministry. As of early 2025, Zimmer remains the ministry's last dedicated minister.

Zimmer was one of three ministers who held the same portfolio throughout Wynne's premiership, along with finance minister Charles Sousa and north development & mines minister Michael Gravelle.

The Liberals suffered their worst result in the party's 161-year history in 2018, and Zimmer was defeated locally in Willowdale by PC candidate Stan Cho, who continues Willowdale's tradition as a ministerial seat in the Ford Ministry.

Wynne ministry, Province of Ontario (2013–2018)
Cabinet post (1)
Predecessor	Office	Successor
Chris Bentley	Minister of Indigenous Relations and Reconciliation (Note: From 2013 to 2016 portfolio was named Minister of Aboriginal Affairs.); 2013-2018	Greg Rickford

=== Post Queen's Park ===
After leaving Queen's Park, Zimmer joined government and public relations firm Aurora Strategy Group in 2019 as a consultant. He resumed his volunteer role chairing the Ontario Liberal Party's dispute resolution body throughout the 2020 and 2023 leadership contests, and was one of three panelists who co-led the party's post-mortem review of its 2022 electoral defeat.

=== Electoral record ===
2018 Ontario general election: Willowdale
Party	Candidate	Votes	%	±%
Progressive Conservative	Stan Cho	17,732	43.63	+11.69
Liberal	David Zimmer	10,815	26.61	–26.22
New Democratic	Saman Tabasinejad	10,481	25.79	+14.70
Green	Randi Ramdeen	932	2.29	–1.65
Libertarian	Catherine MacDonald-Robertson	453	1.11	N/A
Independent	Birinder S. Ahluwalia	233	0.57	N/A
Total valid votes		40,646	100.0	
Progressive Conservative notional gain from Liberal		Swing		+18.96
Source: Elections Ontario

2014 Ontario general election
Party	Candidate	Votes	%	±%
Liberal	David Zimmer	24,300	52.58	+1.58
Progressive Conservative	Michael Ceci	15,468	33.47	+0.08
New Democratic	Alexander Brown	4,693	10.15	-2.63
Green	Teresa Pun	1,758	3.80	+1.65
Total valid votes		46,219	100.0	
Liberal hold		Swing		+1.58
Source: Elections Ontario

2011 Ontario general election
Party	Candidate	Votes	%	±%
Liberal	David Zimmer	22,034	51.00	
Progressive Conservative	Vince Agovino	14,428	33.39	
New Democratic	Alexander Brown	5,522	12.78	
Green	Michael Vettese	930	2.15	
Freedom	Amy Brown	293	0.68	
Source: Elections Ontario

2007 Ontario general election
Party	Candidate	Votes	%	±%
Liberal	David Zimmer	21,065	47.7	
Progressive Conservative	David Shiner	15,418	34.9	
New Democratic	Rini Ghosh	3,755	8.5	
Green	Torbjorn Zetterlund	2,920	6.6	
Libertarian	Heath Thomas	469	1.1	
Family Coalition	Kristin Monster	405	0.9	
Independent	Charles Roddy Sutherland	121	0.3	
Source: Elections Ontario

2003 Ontario general election
Party	Candidate	Votes	%	±%
Liberal	David Zimmer	21,823	46.97	4.69
Progressive Conservative	David Young	19,957	42.95	-7.57
New Democratic	Yvonne Bobb	3,084	6.64	2.38
Green	Sharolyn Vettese	933	2.01	1.26
Family Coalition	Rina Morra	442	0.95	0.02
Freedom	Vaughan Byrnes	227	0.49	0.14
Source: Elections Ontario
