= Ministry of Indigenous Affairs (Ontario) =

Division of the Government of Ontario

Ministry of Indigenous Affairs and First Nations Economic Reconciliation
- Ministère des Affaires autochtones et de la Réconciliation économique avec les Premières Nations (French)
- Government of Ontario wordmark

Ministry overview
- Formed: 2007
- Preceding Ministry: Ontario Secretariat of Aboriginal Affairs
- Jurisdiction: Government of Ontario
- Headquarters: 4th Floor, 160 Bloor Street East, Toronto, Ontario, Canada
- Employees: 150
- Annual budget: $142 million (approved estimate for 2025-26 fiscal year)
- Ministers responsible: Hon. Greg Rickford, Minister of Indigenous Affairs and First Nations Economic Reconciliation; Dave Smith, Parliamentary Assistant to the Minister of Indigenous Affairs
- Website: www.ontario.ca/page/ministry-indigenous-affairs-and-first-nations-economic-reconciliation

The Ministry of Indigenous Affairs and First Nations Economic Reconciliation (IAFNER; formerly the Ministry of Indigenous Affairs) is the Government of Ontario ministry responsible for issues relating to First Nations, Métis and Inuit in Ontario.

The ministry has been headed by Greg Rickford, a member of the Executive Council of Ontario (cabinet), since June 2018. His eight-year tenure makes him the longest serving minister for indigenous affairs in Ontario history. In addition to Rickford who previously served in the federal cabinet as the Minister of Natural Resources, a number of figures of national prominence had led the ministry or its predecessor, including:

- current senior justice of the Supreme Court Andromache Karakatsanis, held the position of Ontario Native Affairs Secretary, the senior civil servant for the unit, between 1995 and 1997
- the late federal Minister of Finance Jim Flaherty, was the Minister Responsible for Native Affairs between 1999 and 2001
- former Ontario Premier Kathleen Wynne, was the Minister of Aboriginal Affairs between 2011 and 2012

== Organization and functions ==
The ministry was created in 2007 as the Ministry of Aboriginal Affairs. Unlike ministries created prior to the 1990s and despite its relative functional permanence, no enabling legislation was ever enacted for the ministry. Its was brought into formal existence via an order in council in November 2007, and its existence is sustained via a series of substituting orders in councils, the most recent one being the order that gave the ministry its current moniker in August, 2024.

The ministry has principle functions are reflected by its three operational divisions:

- negotiations and reconciliation
- strategic policy and planning
- indigenous relations and programs

=== Land claims negotiation ===
The negotiation division is the longest-standing division of the ministry. The negotiation unit was the largest unit in the predecessor secretariat. The division acts as the government's representative in negotiation of Indigenous land claims. Land claims are negotiated by the Ontario and Canadian governments, as representatives of the Crown, directly with First Nations.

The MIA is currently in negotiations with the Government of Canada and the Algonquins of Ontario First Nation (AOO) to resolve aboriginal title to 36,000 square kilometres (14,000 mi^{2}) in eastern Ontario. According to the AOO, the land was never ceded and Algonquin title not recognized. An agreement in principle was reached in 2016.

=== Relationship facilitation ===
In recent years, the ministry has been given additional mandate to facilitate various the interaction of indigenous people with different part of the government and to promote collaboration and coordination across ministries on indigenous policy and programs.

== History ==
Since jurisdiction over "Indians and Lands reserved for the Indians" was exclusively assigned to the federal government by the Constitution Act, 1867, in the first century following Confederation, the role of the Ontario Government in indigenous services and policies was limited to matters relating to federal-provincial agreements regarding the lands and resources of the province.

The provincial government became more directly engaged in indigenous policy matters as it expanded its scope in social services in the 1950s and 1960s, and in view of the increased politicization and organization of indigenous peoples for self-government during the 1970s.

The 1969 White Paper (formally the Statement of the Government of Canada on Indian Policy) recommended the termination of federal responsibility for indigenous services and transfer them to the provinces. While the proposal was withdrawn due to widespread criticism, it triggered the formation of many political organizations and assertions of aboriginal rights and pressures for participation in the policy process. With the emergence of land claims in the 1970s, an Office of Indian Resources Policy was established in the Ministry of Natural Resources in 1978, with a major function of researching land claims.

In 1976, Premier Davis assigned René Brunelle, a long time minister who was demoted to be a minister without portfolio following Davis Ministry being reduced to a minority in the 1975 election, responsibility for the overall coordination of policy development for provincial native affairs. The minister was supported by a single policy advisor and an advisory committee made up of senior civil servants. Brunelle was appointed Provincial Secretary for Resource Development, a non-departmental title charged with coordination of multiple ministries, and maintained his native affairs responsibilities. With the inclusion of Aboriginal rights in the Constitution Act, 1982 and constitutional discussions on self-government, the need for cabinet level coordination became more apparent. In 1982, a cabinet committee on native affairs chaired by the Provincial Secretary for Resource Development was formed, and a native affairs office was instituted in his secretariat. Until the early 1980s, indigenous issues were mainly the responsibilities of the Attorney General and the Provincial Secretary for Resources Development.

=== As formal ministerial responsibility ===
When Liberal David Peterson assumed premiership in June 1985, he formally designated Attorney General Ian Scott as the Minister Eesponsible for Native Affairs, the first time in Ontario history where a minister is specifically designated carriage for indigenous issues. Under Scott's stewardship, a corporate native affairs policy was adopted in October 1985 which articulated the goals of the Peterson ministry and spelt out the broad framework in which individual ministries were expected to operate. It also stated the new government commitment to:

1. Supporting the constitutional entrenchment of Aboriginal rights to self-government
2. Entering into Aboriginal self-government negotiations
3. Assisting Aboriginal peoples in becoming more self-reliant; and
4. Providing services to Aboriginal peoples in a non-discriminatory and culturally sensitive manner.

In December 1986, Ontario, the federal government and Status Indian leaders signed a Declaration of Political Intent, committing themselves to enter into tripartite discussions on issues related to self-government, jurisdiction and powers. In response to the substantially increased work load from these two developments, the Ontario Native Affairs Directorate was established in 1987 with its own line in that year's supply. The entity acted as a support for the Minister Responsible for Native Affairs, and was headed by an executive director.

In 1991, the unit was upgraded and renamed the Ontario Native Affairs Secretariat in 1991, headed by a Secretary with the rank of Assistant Deputy Minister (styled as Assistant Deputy Attorney General). The Secretariat was further renamed the Ontario Aboriginal Affairs Secretariat in 2005. The directorate and its successor secretariat remained a unit within the Ministry of the Attorney General between 1987 and 2007, through ministerial responsibility was not always assigned to the Attorney General.

=== As a standalone ministry ===
In June 2007, acting on the recommendations by the Ipperwash Inquiry, Liberal Premier Dalton McGuinty formally created the standalone Ministry of Aboriginal Affairs with incumbent minister responsible for the Secretariat David Ramsay appointed as the ministry's inaugural minister. Unlike most other ministries, no enabling legislation was ever passed to create this ministry. Instead, it was created and assigned authorities by a series of orders in council.

In late 2012, Kathleen Wynne resigned the portfolio to enter her party leadership contest and emerged as the surprise winner and Ontario's first female Premier in January 2013. Improving the social and economical wellbeing of indigenous people became a cross-government priority during her premiership, thrusting the ministry into roles with much greater prominence and sensitivities while substantially expanded its scope in many of the government's economic policy initiatives. For the entire duration of her premiership, the ministry was headed by David Zimmer, her parliamentary assistant during her own tenure heading the ministry and one of four earliest backers in caucus of her leadership bid. For much of her premiership, the ministry's most senior civil servant and most senior ministerial advisor were also individuals widely known to be long-time associates of the premier. Wynne's personal interest in indigenous issues and continual direct engagement in many of the ministry's key files coincided with the greater interest and social awareness of indigenous issues brought by the work of the Truth and Reconciliation Commission. The confluence of factors led to substantially increased attention and clout for the ministry, enabling many significant, in some cases unprecedented, progress on many longstanding challenges. Under Zimmer's stewardship, the Ontario Government and First Nations leaders entered into a new accord in 2015 that created a formal bilateral relationship and affirmed the right of First Nations to self-government. In response to the final report and recommendations released in December 2015 by the Truth and Reconciliation Commission, Wynne formally apologized from the floor of the legislature to indigenous people for what she called “generations of abuse” on Ontario's behalf in June 2016. As part of Ontario's response to the report, the ministry was renamed the Ministry of Indigenous Relations and Reconciliation. The ministry also released the province's reconciliation action plan titled “The Journey Together” with investment totally $250 million across the government on programs and actions focused on reconciliation with focus in mental health, justice, and cultural revitalization for indigenous people in Ontario.

Unencumbered by any concurrent portfolio responsibilities during his time heading the ministry, Zimmer made the relationship aspect of his role a core focus of his tenure. His long tenure as a minister with a standalone mandate meant he was able to personally represent the government in the home communities of his stakeholders, including many difficult to reach remote reserves. By the end of his tenure, he personally visited 129 of Ontario's 133 First Nations. His five years and four months tenure remained the longest period the ministry has had a solely dedicated minister in cabinet.

Following the 2018 election, the ministry was renamed the Ministry of Indigenous Affairs and has since been helmed by Greg Rickford, a federal cabinet veteran with extensive background in indigenous issue. In June 2024, the ministry was renamed the Ministry of Indigenous Affairs and First Nations Economic Reconciliation.

== Ministers ==
Until 2013, the ministry was rarely assigned a dedicated minister, and their tenures were usually short. Both these points were sources of frequent complaints from indigenous leaders. That changed with Kathleen Wynne, a former minister herself with one of the shortest tenure, appointing her former parliamentary assistant David Zimmer as minister with no other portfolio assignment and kept him in the portfolio for her entire premiership. Wynne's successor Doug Ford has similarly kept Greg Rickford at the ministry for his entire premiership to date.

For much of its history, the ministry shared its minister with another ministry. Only twice was the ministry assigned a dedicated minister with no other cabinet responsibility. Four ministers have headed the ministry while not holding another portfolio:

- Michael Bryant (October 2007 to September 2008, concurrently Government House Leader)
- Brad Duguid (September 2008 to January 2010)
- David Zimmer (February 2013 to June 2018)
- Greg Rickford (since March 2025, concurrently Minister Responsible for Ring of Fire Economic and Community Partnerships) (Prior to March 2025 concurrently held various portfolios including northern development, mines, natural resources & forestry, and energy)

Liberal Ian Scott's tenure of five years and three months was longer than the tenure of his eleven successors. He held the record as the longest-serving minister for close to three decades until surpassed in 2018 by Zimmer's five years, four months tenure. Zimmer's tenure in turn was surpassed in 2023 by Rickford, his immediate successor who has held the portfolio since 2018.

The ministry has a history of being helmed by apparently ambitious ministers. Two ministers, Jim Flaherty and Kathleen Wynne, contested their respective parties' leadership soon after their tenures. While Flaherty was not successful, he went on to serve as federal finance minister for most of the Harper minsitry. Bud Wildman served as interim parliamentary leader of the NDP following the defeat of the government of Bob Rae. David Young, Michael Bryant, Brad Duguid and Chris Bentley were all presumed future leadership contenders during their ministerial career.

Three of the ministers hailed from Northern Ontario, and seven represented Toronto electoral districts. The three exceptions were: Flaherty (Whitby, in Greater Toronto Area), Norm Sterling (Lanark—Carleton, in suburban Ottawa) and Bentley (London West). Coincidentally, three consecutive MPPs representing the Toronto electoral district of Willowdale had helmed the ministry: Charles Harnick (MPP 1990–99, minister 1995–99); David Young (MPP 1999–2003, minister 2001–03); David Zimmer (MPP 2003–18, minister 2013–18). Despite Zimmer being from a rival party and having defeated Young in a close contest, and despite Harnick having strained relationship with many Harris era conservatives due to the Ipperwash Inquiry, the three men remain cordial personal friends with each other.

Nine of the thirteen ministers were lawyers by trade. Of the ten, only David Young had served elected municipal offices. The four non-lawyers - Bud Wildman, David Ramsay, Brad Duguid and Kathleen Wynne - all held municipal offices prior to being elected MPP.

Wynne was the only woman to have served as the portfolio minister. However, numerous women had headed the ministry's civil servants:

- Andromache Karakatsanis - Ontario Native Affairs Secretary 1995-97 (at the rank of assistant deputy minister), and went on to become Deputy Attorney General in 1997, Secretary of Cabinet (head of the Ontario Public Service) in 2000, and was appointed to the Superior Court of Justice in 2002, to the Court of Appeal in 2010 and to the Supreme Court of Canada in 2011
- Marg Rappolt - deputy minister 2006–08, and later deputy minister of community and social services (2009–15)
- Lori Sterling - deputy minister 2008–12, and later a deputy minister in the federal government (2012–18)
- Deb Richardson - as deputy minister 2015–19 was the first Indigenous woman to attain the rank of deputy minister in the Ontario government; later Deputy Solicitor General (2019–21), Secretary of the Treasury Board (2021–24), deputy health minister (since 2024)

Portrait	Name	Term of office	Tenure	Party Ministry	Note
Minister Responsible for Native Affairs					
	Ian Scott (1934–2006); MPP for St. George—St. David	June 26, 1985 — October 1, 1990	5 years, 97 days	Peterson Liberal	While Attorney General
	Bud Wildman (b. 1946); MPP for Algoma	October 1, 1990 — June 26, 1995	4 years, 268 days	Rae NDP	While Minister of Natural Resources (to 1993)/Minister of the Environment and Energy (from 1993)
	Charles Harnick (b. 1950); MPP for Willowdale	June 26, 1995 — June 17, 1999	3 years, 356 days	Harris PC	While Attorney General
	Jim Flaherty (b. 1949–2014); MPP for Whitby	June 17, 1999 — February 8, 2001	1 year, 236 days	Harris PC	While Attorney General
	David Young (b. 1957); MPP for Willowdale	February 8, 2001 — February 25, 2003	2 years, 17 days	Harris PC	While Attorney General
	Norm Sterling (b.1942); MPP for Lanark—Carleton	February 25, 2003 — October 22, 2003	239 days	Eves PC	While Attorney General
	Michael Bryant (b. 1966); MPP for St. Paul's	October 23, 2003 — June 29, 2005	1 year, 249 days (1st time)	McGuinty Liberal	While Attorney General
Minister Responsible for Aboriginal Affairs				McGuinty Liberal	
	David Ramsay (1948–2020); MPP for Timiskaming—Cochrane	June 29, 2005 — June 21, 2007	(continued)	McGuinty Liberal	While Minister of Natural Resources
Minister of Aboriginal Affairs				McGuinty Liberal	
	David Ramsay	June 21, 2007 — October 30, 2007	2 years, 123 days	McGuinty Liberal	Concurrently Minister of Natural Resources
	Michael Bryant (2nd time)	October 30, 2007 — September 18, 2008	2 years, 209 days (total) (2nd time: 324 days)	McGuinty Liberal	Concurrently Government House Leader
	Brad Duguid (b. 1962); MPP for Scarborough Centre	September 18, 2008 — January 18, 2010	1 year, 122 days	McGuinty Liberal	
	Chris Bentley (b. 1956); MPP for London West	January 18, 2010 — October 20, 2011	1 year, 275 days (1st time)	McGuinty Liberal	Concurrently Attorney General
	Kathleen Wynne (b. 1953); MPP for Don Valley West	October 20, 2011 — November 5, 2012	1 year, 16 days	McGuinty Liberal	Concurrently Minister of Municipal Affairs and Housing. Resigned to seek Ontario Liberal Party leadership
	Chris Bentley (2nd time, interim)	November 5, 2012 — February 11, 2013	2 years, 8 days (total) (second time: 98 days)	McGuinty Liberal	Concurrently Minister of Energy
	David Zimmer (b. 1944); MPP for Willowdale	February 11, 2013 — June 13, 2016	(continue)	Wynne Liberal	Served previously as parliamentary assistant to Bryant, Bentley & Wynne
Minister of Indigenous Relations and Reconciliation				Wynne Liberal	
	David Zimmer	June 13, 2016 — June 28, 2018	5 years, 137 days	Wynne Liberal	
Minister of Indigenous Affairs					
	Greg Rickford (b. 1967); MPP for Kenora—Rainy River	June 29, 2018 — March 19, 2025	(continue)	Ford PC	Concurrently Minister of Northern Development (2018–25), Mines (2018–21), Energy (2018–21), Natural Resources and Forestry (2021–22)
Minister of Indigenous Affairs and First Nations Economic Reconciliation				Ford PC	
	Greg Rickford	March 19, 2025—present	8 years, 121 days	Ford PC	Concurrently Minister Responsible for Ring of Fire Economic and Community Partnerships

== See also ==
- Crown-Indigenous Relations and Northern Affairs Canada - Canadian federal government department
- Ministry of Natural Resources (Ontario)
