= David Young (Ontario politician) =

Canadian politician

The Honourable David Young ECO

Ontario MPP
- In office 1999–2003
- Preceded by: Charles Harnick
- Succeeded by: David Zimmer
- Constituency: Willowdale

Personal details
- Born: 1957 (age 68–69) Toronto, Ontario, Canada
- Party: Progressive Conservative
- Spouse: Ellen
- Children: 3
- Occupation: Lawyer

David S. Young (born c. 1957) is a former politician in Ontario, Canada. He was a Progressive Conservative member of the Legislative Assembly of Ontario from 1999 to 2003. He represented the riding of Willowdale and served as a cabinet minister in the governments of Mike Harris and Ernie Eves.

== Background ==
Young was born and raised in Toronto, Ontario. He was educated at Osgoode Hall Law School of York University in Toronto, and practised law after his graduation. He worked at the firm of Benson McMurtry from 1981 to 1987, and has been a partner in Benson Percival Brown since 1987. Young has also served as a director of the Canadian Society for Yad Vashem, and was for ten years an executive member of the Ratepayer's Association.

In 2021, David was awarded the Gold Key Achievement Award by the Osgoode Hall Alumni Association. The award recognizes exceptional professional success and leadership and is bestowed upon candidates that have demonstrated a record of professional accomplishment, leadership and contribution to the community.

He and his wife Ellen live in Toronto, Ontario, where they raised three children.

== Politics ==
He began his political career as a school trustee, serving on the North York Public School Board from 1991 to 1997. In the provincial election of 1999, he was elected to the Ontario legislature for the north Toronto riding of Willowdale, defeating Liberal candidate Fahimeh Mortazavi by about 3,500 votes.

Young was named Attorney General and Minister responsible for Native Affairs in the government of Mike Harris on February 8, 2001. He was generally regarded as one of the more centrist figures in Harris's government, and supported Ernie Eves to replace Harris as Premier in 2002. When Eves was sworn into office on April 15, 2002, he kept Young in the Attorney-General's portfolio.

In 2002, Young introduced the Legal Aid Services Amendment Act (Bill 181), which permitted Legal Aid Ontario to hire staff lawyers and contract with individual lawyers and law firms. The Bill was intended to improve Ontario's justice system by granting Legal Aid Ontario enhanced flexibility to permit them to enter into fee-for-service agreements with qualified lawyers and law firms to provide legal aid services in a given community, and expand the functions of family and criminal law duty counsel. Critics argued against the intermingling of the private and public sectors, and suggested that the Bill would lead to a two-tiered legal system in Ontario. Young also increased the hourly payment rates of Legal Aid Ontario workers by 5% an hour.

After a cabinet shuffle on February 25, 2003, Young became the Minister of Municipal Affairs and Housing.

Many expected that Young would be re-elected in the provincial election of 2003, despite a general decline in Tory support throughout Toronto. Young's performance in cabinet was generally respected, and he was sometimes described as a possible successor to Eves as party leader. The provincial trend, however, was too much to overcome: the Tories were defeated in all of their Toronto seats, and Young lost the Willowdale riding to Liberal candidate David Zimmer by 1,866 votes.

In 2014, David served as a senior advisor, executive committee member and legal counsel to the successful John Tory campaign for Mayor of Toronto.

=== Cabinet positions ===
Eves ministry, Province of Ontario (2002–2003)
Cabinet post (1)
Predecessor	Office	Successor
Chris Hodgson	Minister of Municipal Affairs and Housing; 2003 (February - October)	John Gerretsen
Harris ministry, Province of Ontario (1995–2002)
Cabinet post (1)
Predecessor	Office	Successor
Jim Flaherty	Attorney General; 2001-2003; Also Responsible for Native Affairs	Norm Sterling
