= Navigator Ltd =

Canadian public relations company

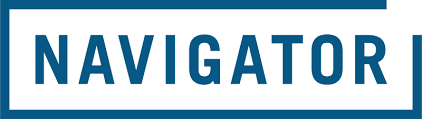
- Company type: Consulting firm
- Industry: Public relations Crisis Management; Lobbying
- Founded: 2000
- Founder: Jamie Watt
- Headquarters: Toronto, Canada
- Area served: Toronto; Ottawa; Calgary; Edmonton; Moncton
- Website: navltd.com

Navigator Ltd. is a Canadian public relations, crisis management, lobbying, and polling company based in Toronto, with offices in Ottawa, Calgary, Edmonton, and Moncton, Canada. They have represented a number of high-profile Canadian clients including Brian Mulroney, Michael Bryant, and Magna International. The company was founded in 2000 by Jaime Watt, a communications strategist tied to the Progressive Conservative Party of Ontario. Watt remains the Executive Chairman of the company.

== Early history ==
When Navigator was founded in 2000, it was closely tied to the Progressive Conservative Party of Ontario and the then Premier of Ontario Mike Harris. Among its early efforts was polling in the 2002 Progressive Conservative Party of Ontario leadership election, when it was accused by one of the candidates, Tony Clement, of having had access to the party's membership list to conduct its polling; Navigator founder Jamie Watt would later be election campaign co-chair to the successful leadership candidate Ernie Eves in the 2003 Ontario general election. The company soon expanded its organization to include members of other political parties, such as the high-profile Liberal Warren Kinsella, who joined it in 2002, and Robin Sears, a longtime New Democratic Party strategist, in 2004. Navigator and Watt continued to have deep ties to conservatives parties in Canada at the provincial and federal levels; Watt acted as a campaign advisor for Belinda Stronach in the 2004 Conservative Party of Canada leadership election.

== Notable clients ==
Among its major clients in the middle of the 2000s was the Toronto Catholic District School Board, who hired Navigator in 2005 to promote the school system and attract new students. The following year, the Toronto District School Board also hired Navigator. In 2007 they were hired to act as spokespeople for former Canadian Prime Minister Brian Mulroney. During the 2006 Canadian federal election a former Navigator employee and Preston Manning staffer named Patrick Muttart was a campaign advisor for Stephen Harper and was credited with being one of the key figures behind his electoral victory that year. Another high-profile client was Western University which hired Navigator during the process of negotiating a widely criticized contract with university president Amit Chakma. That controversy continued for several years.

A high-profile client of Navigator in 2009 was Michael Bryant, the former Attorney General of Ontario and Government House Leader, who hired the firm after facing charges for the death of a cyclist, Darcy Allan Sheppard. The firm was also investigated in 2009 by the Commissioner of Lobbying which caused then Prime Minister Stephen Harper and the Prime Minister's Office to temporarily suspend relations with them. Harper's office was then criticized by opposition politicians for revealing that an investigation had been taking place, as they are supposed to remain private while in progress. It was eventually revealed that the investigation had involved a fundraiser for Conservative Party of Canada minister Lisa Raitt. The Commissioner of Lobbying did not find that any wrongdoing had taken place. However, a subsequent investigation did find that Will Stewart, a consultant with Navigator, did break lobbying ethics rules by organizing the fundraiser for Raitt in September 2009 while also acting as lobbyist to the government she represented.

The firm was also involved in controversial contracts with the government of Alberta during the period of 2011 to 2013, during which time a Navigator employee Jason Hatcher acted as spokesperson for Premier of Alberta Jim Prentice. In 2014 the Auditor General of Alberta investigated the practice of awarding sole-source contracts to Navigator by Alberta Health and Municipal Affairs, eventually finding that proper contracting procedures had not been followed. In 2015 Wildrose Party of Alberta members accused the Prentice government of continuing to employ Navigator for its lobbying efforts.

In 2014 the firm took on Jian Ghomeshi, a CBC host who was then accused of sexual misconduct and physical assault in the workplace. However, the firm soon cut ties with Ghomeshi.

In 2015 Navigator expanded with the takeover of Playbook Communications. In 2018 Navigator acquired Haddon Strategy and relaunched it as True, aiming to work online more effectively.

In 2020, after facing questions about falsifying her Indigenous heritage, filmmaker Michelle Latimer became a client of Navigator.

During February 2022 protests in Ottawa against COVID-19 mitigations, the Ottawa Police Service hired Navigator to handle messaging.

Hockey Canada hired Navigator in mid-2022 amid a scandal over its handling of sexual assault allegations.

Special rapporteur on foreign interference and former governor general of Canada, David Johnston hired Navigator in 2023, but the partnership ended after a week.
