= Armourdale (electoral district) =

Former provincial electoral district in Ontario, Canada

Ontario electoral district

Defunct provincial electoral district
- Legislature: Legislative Assembly of Ontario
- District created: 1963
- District abolished: 1985
- First contested: 1963
- Last contested: 1987

Demographics
- Census division: Toronto
- Census subdivision: Toronto

Armourdale was a provincial riding in Ontario, Canada. It was represented in the Legislative Assembly of Ontario from the 1963 provincial election until it was eliminated in 1987, when most of its territory was incorporated into the ridings of Wilson Heights, Willowdale, and York Mills. Armourdale was created from part of the former riding of York Centre. It was in the former borough of North York and occupied an area to the west of Yonge Street and east of Bathurst Street.

Three Members of Provincial Parliament represented the riding during its history. The most notable was Philip Givens who was a former mayor of Toronto. He ran in 1975 against Mel Lastman who went on to become mayor of North York and Toronto.

== Members of Provincial Parliament ==
Armourdale
Assembly	Years	Member	Party
Created from York Centre in 1963
27th	1963–1967	Gordon Carton	Progressive Conservative
28th	1967–1971	Gordon Carton	Progressive Conservative
29th	1971–1975	Gordon Carton	Progressive Conservative
30th	1975–1977	Phil Givens	Liberal
31st	1977–1981	Bruce McCaffrey	Progressive Conservative
32nd	1981–1985	Bruce McCaffrey	Progressive Conservative
33rd	1985–1987	Bruce McCaffrey	Progressive Conservative
Sourced from the Ontario Legislative Assembly
Merged into Wilson Heights, Willowdale, and York Mills ridings after 1987

== Electoral results ==
1985 Ontario general election
Party	Candidate	Votes	%	±%
Progressive Conservative	Bruce McCaffrey	13,394	41.26	–13.37
Liberal	Gino Matrundola	13,182	40.61	+9.77
New Democratic	Bob Hebdon	5,429	16.72	+2.19
Libertarian	Simon Srdarev	456	1.40	–
Total valid votes		32,461	99.41	
Total rejected ballots		193	0.59	–0.01
Turnout		32,654	68.25	+7.82
Eligible voters		47,845		
Progressive Conservative hold		Swing		–11.57
Source: Elections Ontario

1981 Ontario general election
Party	Candidate	Votes	%	±%
Progressive Conservative	Bruce McCaffrey	15,938	54.63	+11.96
Liberal	Tim Rutledge	8,997	30.84	–4.46
New Democratic	Bob Hebdon	4,240	14.53	–5.88
Total valid votes		29,175	99.40	
Total rejected ballots		177	0.60	+0.02
Turnout		29,352	60.43	–7.60
Eligible voters		48,571		
Progressive Conservative hold		Swing		+8.21
Source: Elections Ontario

1977 Ontario general election
Party	Candidate	Votes	%	±%
Progressive Conservative	Bruce McCaffrey	14,082	42.67	+6.93
Liberal	Desmond G. Newman	11,649	35.29	–8.61
New Democratic	Marlene Koehler	6,736	20.41	+1.76
Libertarian	Bruce Evoy	280	0.85	–0.87
Independent	David L. Wraggett	258	0.78	–
Total valid votes		33,005	99.42	
Total rejected ballots		192	0.58	–0.03
Turnout		33,197	68.04	–0.78
Eligible voters		48,794		
Progressive Conservative gain from Liberal		Swing		+7.77
Source: Elections Ontario

1975 Ontario general election
Party	Candidate	Votes	%	±%
Liberal	Philip Givens	14,526	43.90	+17.30
Progressive Conservative	Mel Lastman	11,824	35.74	–14.25
New Democratic	Marlene Mocciola	6,169	18.65	–4.77
Libertarian	David Liddiard	567	1.71	–
Total valid votes		33,086	99.40	
Total rejected ballots		201	0.60	–0.02
Turnout		33,287	68.81	–5.24
Eligible voters		48,372		
Liberal gain from Progressive Conservative		Swing		+15.78
Source: Elections Ontario

1971 Ontario general election
Party	Candidate	Votes	%	±%
Progressive Conservative	Gordon Carton	16,055	49.99	+5.67
Liberal	Donald (D.R.) Copley	8,544	26.60	–1.78
New Democratic	Harold Koehler	7,519	23.41	–3.88
Total valid votes		32,118	99.38	
Total rejected ballots		202	0.63	–0.16
Turnout		32,320	74.05	+7.67
Eligible voters		43,646		
Progressive Conservative hold		Swing		+3.72
Source: Elections Ontario

1967 Ontario general election
Party	Candidate	Votes	%	±%
Progressive Conservative	Gordon Carton	10,721	44.32	–5.77
Liberal	Donald J. Brill	6,866	28.38	–1.23
New Democratic	Harold Koehler	6,602	27.29	+7.00
Total valid votes		24,189	99.22	
Total rejected ballots		191	0.78	+0.01
Turnout		24,380	66.38	+2.47
Eligible voters		36,730		
Progressive Conservative hold		Swing		–2.27
Source: Elections Ontario

1963 Ontario general election
Party	Candidate	Votes	%
Progressive Conservative	Gordon Carton	10,218	50.09
Liberal	Al Hollingworth	6,042	29.62
New Democratic	Vincent Kelly	4,140	20.29
Total valid votes		20,400	99.23
Total rejected ballots		158	0.77
Turnout		20,558	63.90
Eligible voters		32,170	
Progressive Conservative pickup new district.			
Source: Elections Ontario

== See also ==
- List of Ontario provincial electoral districts
- Canadian provincial electoral districts
