= Legal Aid BC =

Non-profit in British Columbia, Canada

Legal Aid BC (formerly the Legal Services Society) is the legal aid provider in British Columbia, Canada.

Services are available for family (separation/divorce and child protection/removal), criminal law matters, and refugee applications, and include legal information, advice, or representation, depending on the client’s legal problem.

Legal Aid BC is a non-profit organization governed by a nine-member board of directors. While the provincial government is its primary funder, the society remains independent of government. It also receives funding from other sources, including the Law Foundation of British Columbia and the Notary Foundation of British Columbia. Provincial funding has declined over the past two decades, significantly impacting the Society's services and operations (see below).

Former Attorney-General of Ontario Michael Bryant was the chief executive officer of Legal Aid BC from January 17, 2022, to April 9, 2024, when Salman Azam took on the role of Interim CEO.

Wendy Jackson became the Chief Executive Officer of Legal Aid BC on February 3, 2025.

== Services ==
Legal Aid BC provides three main types of services: information services, advice services, and representation services. Information services include outreach worker requests, as well as publications such as self-help manuals, legal aid awareness materials, Aboriginal publications, and general legal information. MyLawBC.com provides online guided pathways and dispute support.

Advice services include criminal, refugee, and family duty counsels, as well as the Brydges phone line (providing "Province-wide, toll-free telephone advice service for persons who have been arrested, detained, or are under active investigation by a law enforcement agency") and the Family LawLINE (a "phone service for financially eligible people that provides information on a variety of family law issues").

Representation services provide the full services of a lawyer for eligible individuals in the areas of criminal, family, and immigration law.

== History of legal aid in British Columbia ==
Prior to the 1970s, legal aid services for low-income individuals were provided by the pro bono work of lawyers and solicitors in the province. Throughout the 1970s, the federal and provincial governments began providing funding for such legal aid services. Government support of legal aid services was formalized in 1979 with the establishment of the LSS by provincial statute.

== Funding and related issues ==
Legal Aid BC is funded primarily by the Province of British Columbia, providing approximately 93% of the Society's annual budget. The provincial Law and Notary Foundations together provide the remaining seven percent. Provincial funding and, subsequently, Legal Aid services in the province have diminished for close to two decades. Approximately 40% of the one-time budget has been cut, equating to nearly 50 million dollars. The largest decline in this funding came in 2002, when it was reduced by close to 30 million dollars. The Province of British Columbia ranks third lowest in Canada in per capital legal aid spending.

The funding reductions have had major impacts on many aspects of the Legal Services Society and legal aid in the province. In the 1990s, BC had one of the most comprehensive legal aid programs in Canada, but government funding would become insufficient to support such a program. By 2010, 50 Regional Offices closed throughout the province, leaving only two. Currently, in areas without a Regional Office, the Legal Services Society relies on the Province's courthouses and the private law offices of lawyers and solicitors to liaise with potential clients about the legal aid services available to them. Another result of the funding cuts has been a 40% lay-off rate of the Society's support staff. Furthermore, "[the] number of legal aid cases approved for legal representation declined dramatically between 2001 and 2010: the number of family law cases approved dropped from 15,526 to 6,270 and poverty law referrals went from 40,279 to 0 (legal representation for poverty law – housing, welfare, disability pensions, debt – has been eliminated)." At a broader level, this decline in Provincial funding "has contributed to the court system being overwhelmed and cases being thrown out."

In March 2011, the Public Commission on Legal Aid in British Columbia was released. In it, "[the] overwhelming majority of [public and private] submissions spoke to the general failure of our legal aid system, the negative repercussions for needy individuals and families, and the consequent adverse impact on our communities and justice system." The Commission went on to recommend, among other things, an increase in long-term, stable funding to the LSS, as well as an official recognition of legal aid as an essential public service. In November 2011, Robert J. Bauman, the Chief Justice of the Supreme Court of British Columbia, stated that the province's judicial system "is threatened, if not in peril.... Inadequate funding of courts [including legal aid] in British Columbia has been the reality for the last number of years. We are not at the tipping point yet- but we are steadily edging towards it."

According to a 2008 Ipsos Reid poll, public support for legal aid in British Columbia remains very high, with 93% of respondents saying they support these services.

The legal community in British Columbia strongly supports legal aid services and continues to protest the funding reductions. On November 30, 2011, the Trial Lawyers Association of British Columbia held a Rally in Ribbons and Robes, a province-wide protest on the steps of regional and provincial courthouses to raise awareness about the state of legal aid in British Columbia. The Association carried out job-action protests from January to April, 2012. The primary component of the job-action impacted the duty counsel services outlined above; these services were withheld for one week in January 2012, two weeks in February, three weeks in March, and throughout all of April.

On December 30, 2011, the Minister of Justice and Attorney General of British Columbia, the Honourable Shirley Bond, announced an augmentation of LSS funding, by $2.1 million annually. This announcement was received positively by the LSS.
