= Michael Bryant (politician) =

Canadian lawyer and former politician

The Honourable Michael J. Bryant ECO

Chief Executive Officer of Legal Aid BC
- In office 2022–2024
- Preceded by: Mark Benton
- Succeeded by: Salman Azam

Executive Director and General Counsel of the Canadian Civil Liberties Association
- In office 2018–2022
- Preceded by: Noa Mendelsohn-Aviv (acting)
- Succeeded by: Noa Mendelsohn-Aviv

Member of the Ontario Provincial Parliament for St. Paul's
- In office 1999–2009
- Preceded by: New riding
- Succeeded by: Eric Hoskins

Personal details
- Born: Michael James Bryant; April 13, 1966 (age 60) Victoria, British Columbia
- Party: Ontario Liberal Party
- Relations: Susan Abramovitch (sep. December 2010)
- Children: 2
- Education: University of British Columbia; Osgoode Hall Law School; Harvard Law School
- Occupation: lawyer, executive

Michael J. Bryant (born April 13, 1966) is a Canadian lawyer and former Attorney General of Ontario. He was the CEO of Legal Aid BC from January 2022 to April 2024. Previously, he was executive director and general counsel for the Canadian Civil Liberties Association.

Bryant was a Liberal member of the Legislative Assembly of Ontario, representing the downtown Toronto riding of St. Paul's from 1999 to 2009. He was a senior member of Dalton McGuinty's provincial cabinet, first as Attorney General, being the province's youngest-ever to hold that post, and subsequently as Minister of Aboriginal Affairs, Minister of Economic Development and Government House Leader.

Bryant left provincial politics to take up the newly created post of chief executive officer of Invest Toronto, a municipal agency with a mandate to attract investment and facilitate economic development. An altercation with a cyclist in 2009 led to Bryant being charged for the cyclist's death; the charges were withdrawn in 2010.

== Background ==
Bryant was raised in the Greater Victoria area of British Columbia, where his father Ray was mayor of Esquimalt from 1966 to 1969. Known for his "pugnacious streak", he trained as a boxer from childhood.

He received a Bachelor of Arts degree from the University of British Columbia in 1988, and a Master's degree from the same institution in 1989. Bryant was also a member of the Sigma Chi fraternity at UBC. He graduated as in 1992 from Osgoode Hall Law School at York University in Toronto with a law degree. and was the silver medalist of his year. He then earned an LL.M. magna cum laude from Harvard Law School in 1994. Bryant was a Fulbright Fellow. He clerked at the Supreme Court of Canada in 1992–93, and was later a lawyer at the firm of Sullivan & Cromwell in New York City, as well as lecturing in law at King's College London in England, and practicing litigation at McCarthy Tétrault. In 1997, he became an adjunct professor in international law at the Department of Political Science at the University of Toronto.

Bryant was married to Susan Abramovitch, an entertainment lawyer, and they have two children, Sadie and Louis. The couple separated in December 2010.

== Politics ==
Bryant was elected to the Ontario legislature in the provincial election of 1999, defeating incumbent Progressive Conservative cabinet minister Isabel Bassett in St. Paul's by almost 5,000 votes. Earlier, Bryant became the Liberal Party's nominee by defeating future premier Kathleen Wynne, 328 votes to 143. The Progressive Conservative government was re-elected, and Bryant served in Opposition Critic to the Attorney General for the next four years.

He was re-elected by a greater majority in the provincial election of 2003. The Liberals won a majority government in this election, and Bryant was appointed Ontario Attorney General and Minister with responsibility for Native Affairs and Democratic Renewal. While Attorney General he helped create Ontario's controversial Stunt Driving law, aimed at reducing street racing, and supported seizing and crushing vehicles that had been modified for street racing. Bryant was also a strong proponent of a complete ban on handguns in Canada, at one point launching a website named "No Gun, No Funeral".

Bryant was re-elected in the 2007 election. He was appointed as Minister of Aboriginal Affairs and Government House Leader on October 30, 2007. On September 18, 2008, he became Minister of Economic Development, replacing Sandra Pupatello.

On May 23, 2009, Bryant announced that he would leave provincial politics to become CEO of the newly established Invest Toronto corporation, with Dalton McGuinty taking over his portfolio of Economic Development. Bryant denied that his departure was as a result of a falling out with McGuinty, though reports suggested that Bryant's outspoken nature and ambition for the Premier's job may have been controversial within McGuinty's inner circle. Bryant's resignation was effective June 7, 2009. Eric Hoskins retained the seat for the Liberals in a by-election held on September 17, 2009.

== 2009 criminal charges ==
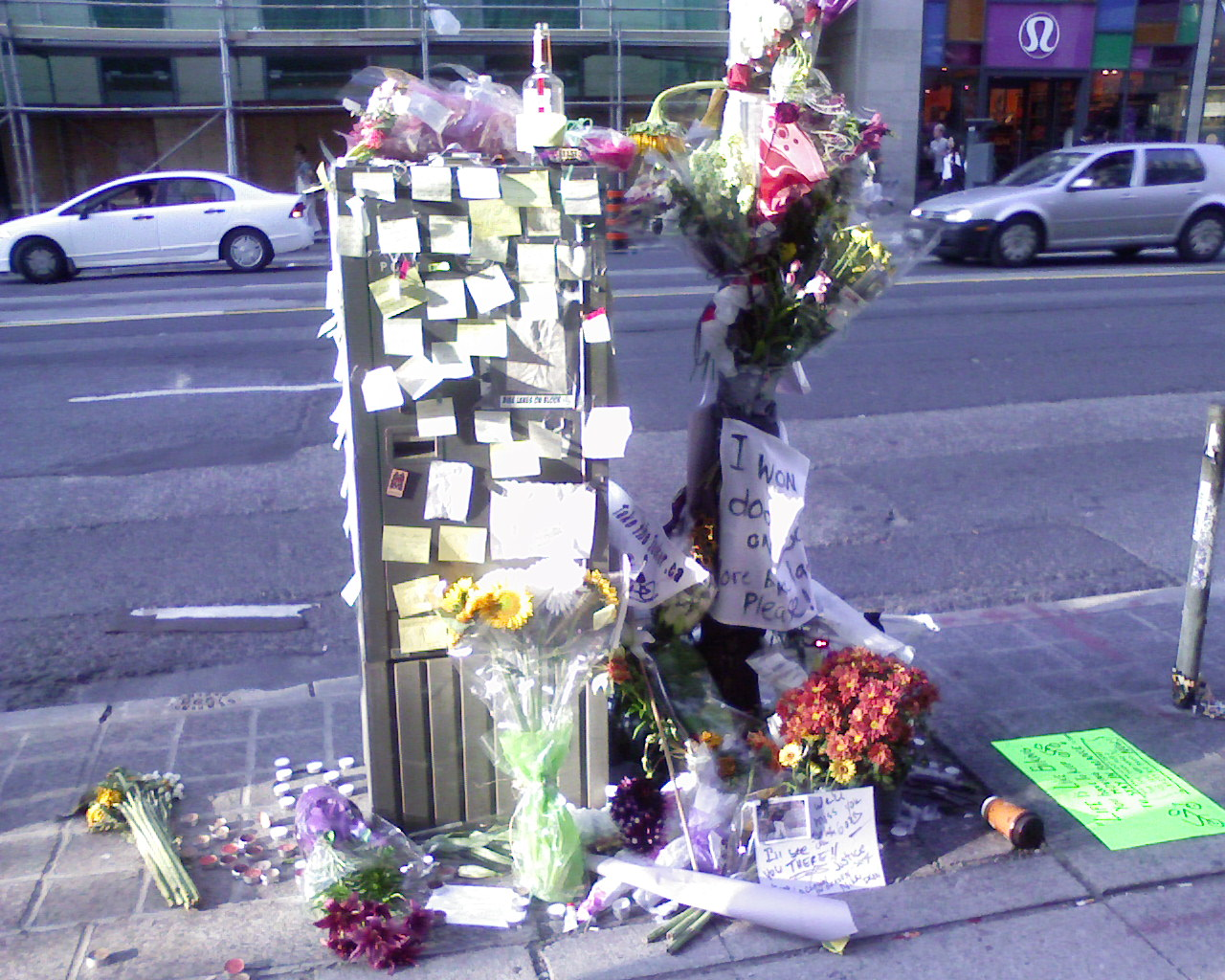
A makeshift memorial marks the place on Bloor Street West where Sheppard was seriously injured.

On September 1, 2009, Bryant was taken into police custody after an altercation with cyclist Darcy Allan Sheppard on a downtown Toronto street which resulted in Sheppard's death. Bryant was later charged with criminal negligence causing death and dangerous driving causing death with respect to the incident. On May 25, 2010, prosecutor Richard Peck withdrew all charges against Bryant stemming from the incident, noting there was "no reasonable prospect of conviction".

=== Incident ===
On the evening of August 31, 2009, Bryant and his wife were driving home in his convertible after celebrating their 12th wedding anniversary. They passed a cyclist, Darcy Allan Sheppard, who according to an interview with Bryant was tossing garbage and holding up traffic by executing figure eights on his bike. As they neared a pedestrian crossing Sheppard pulled in front of Bryant's vehicle at a red light. Subsequent events were captured by security cameras.

According to Bryant, his vehicle stalled when he stopped behind Sheppard. Bryant's car then lurched forward from his attempts to restart the vehicle, which brought the car close to or in contact with Sheppard's tire. Camera footage of the incident was inconclusive. The Crown suggested no damage to the bicycle's rear wheel rim was evident. Witnesses said that Sheppard confronted Bryant and his wife "loudly and aggressively" while they "remained passive". Bryant's next driving maneuver resulted in Sheppard ending up on the hood of the car: the car travelled 30 feet in 2.5 seconds, at between 9 and 13.4 km/h, and brakes were applied after 1 second. According to Bryant, he was looking down at the time, trying to restart the vehicle, and applied the brakes when he saw Sheppard on the hood. The Crown suggested that there was no evidence Sheppard was seriously injured at this time and there was not enough evidence to justify a separate charge based upon Bryant's driving to this point.

The fatality occurred when Bryant drove away while Sheppard was holding onto the side of the vehicle. Witnesses reported that Sheppard reached into Bryant's convertible and grabbed either Bryant or the car's steering wheel. At no point did Bryant attempt to stop. The car then veered into the opposite lanes, which caused Sheppard to strike a roadside fire hydrant. The collision knocked him off the car and his head hit the pavement. Bryant drove away from the scene to a nearby hotel. Three minutes later, he called 9-1-1. Sheppard later died of his injuries in hospital. The police did not thoroughly investigate whether Bryant was driving under the influence.

=== Aftermath ===
Bryant was released the next day by the police on his own recognizance without a bail hearing. In a public statement, he maintained that he was innocent of the charges and extended condolences to Sheppard's family. The terms of Bryant's release required him to abstain from driving, surrender his passport and remain in Ontario. He was represented by Marie Henein. Bryant also resigned as CEO of Invest Toronto, saying that the arrest would act as a distraction for the corporation.

Bryant's actions and arrest were a subject of controversy in Canadian media. Bryant hired a public relations firm, Navigator Ltd., while a campaign emerged on blogs and social networks that attempted to cast Sheppard in a favourable light. A Twitter account run by Navigator was countered by another Twitter account set up by public relations professional Don Wiedman. On YouTube, an anonymous user posted videos of the surveillance footage broadcast by CTV News, CityTV News, and CBC News.

The Ministry of the Attorney General appointed British Columbia's Richard Peck as the prosecutor to avoid any conflict-of-interest, as Bryant had appointed judges when he served as Attorney General of Ontario. His first court date was scheduled for October 19, 2009. The matter was adjourned six times.

On May 25, 2010, prosecutor Richard Peck withdrew all charges against Bryant stemming from the incident, noting there was "no reasonable prospect of conviction". Peck said that "[Bryant] was attacked by a man who unfortunately was in a rage. [Bryant] was legally justified in his attempt to get away", and noted that Sheppard had run-ins with six other motorists in the same month before his encounter with Bryant, and was witnessed throwing traffic cones in front of cars at the corner of Bloor and Yonge less than twenty minutes before the incident. The decision to withdraw charges was criticised by Marli Epp, a spokesperson for the Toronto Bike Messenger Association and Yvonne Bambrick, Executive Director of the Toronto Cyclists Union.

In August 2012, Bryant published a book, 28 Seconds, his memoir of Sheppard's death and of Bryant's own experience with and recovery from alcoholism.

== Later life ==
In December 2009, Bryant returned to the private practice of law and joined Norton Rose LLP (formerly Ogilvy Renault) as Senior Advisor and was involved with commercial and investment matters relating to energy, natural resources and infrastructure/public-private partnerships. In 2012 he moved to the Ishkonigan, a consulting and mediation firm owned by Phil Fontaine, where he accepted a position as a principal.

In 2015 he began to work for Legal Aid Ontario as a criminal defence duty counsel. In 2016, he was working in partnership with King Law Chambers as a criminal defence lawyer for the indigent and indigenous, and negotiating aboriginal land claims for First Nations. In 2018 he was appointed executive director and general counsel for the Canadian Civil Liberties Association.

In October 2021, he was appointed chief executive officer of Legal Aid BC. His term began January 17, 2022. He left the post in April, 2024.

In May 2025, British Columbia Premier David Eby terminated a contract worth $150,000 with a consulting company owned by Bryant to advise on improving conditions in Vancouver's Downtown Eastside, which critics slammed as a political favour lacking transparency.

McGuinty ministry, Province of Ontario (2003–2013)
Cabinet posts (3)
Predecessor	Office	Successor
Sandra Pupatello	Minister of Economic Development; 2008–2009	Dalton McGuinty
David Ramsay	Minister of Aboriginal Affairs; 2007–2008	Brad Duguid
Norm Sterling	Attorney General; 2003–2007; Also responsible for Native Affairs and Democratic Renewal (2003–2005)	Chris Bentley
Special Parliamentary Responsibilities
Predecessor	Title	Successor
Jim Bradley	Government House Leader; 2007–2009	Monique Smith
