= Muttart =

Muttart is a surname. Notable people with the surname include:

- Ephraim Bell Muttart (1839–1912), Canadian physician and politician
- Patrick Muttart (born 1972), Canadian political strategist and business executive
