= Les Scheininger =

Canadian activist (1941–2020)

President of the Canadian Jewish Congress
- In office 1989–1992
- Preceded by: Dorothy Reitman
- Succeeded by: Irving Abella

Personal details
- Born: August 12, 1947 (age 78) Steyr, Allied-occupied Austria
- Spouse: Judy Weiss (m. 1969)

Lester Scheininger (born August 12, 1947) is a Canadian politician and lawyer who served as president of the Canadian Jewish Congress from 1989 to 1992. He ran for the Legislative Assembly of Ontario in the 1995 provincial election as a candidate of the Ontario Liberal Party.

== Leadership ==
Scheininger chaired the Canadian Jewish Congress's Ontario region during the 1980s, and argued in favour of public funding of denominational education.

He was elected president of the Canadian Jewish Congress in April 1989, succeeding Dorothy Reitman. During his acceptance speech, Scheininger said that his primary goal was to improve Canada's relationship with Israel. He argued that Canada's recent upgrade in relations with the Palestine Liberation Organization had "[put] into jeopardy the possibility of Canada providing a useful role in the Middle East process", and that Israel would have difficulty accepting Canada as an "honest broker" in the future. He said he would promote anti-hate crime laws, and work to mediate disputes between Orthodox, Conservative and Reform communities within Canada.

In June 1989, Scheininger criticized the Canadian government for supporting a United Nations motions that condemned Israel's military actions in the West Bank and Gaza. He supported the Israeli government's decision to kidnap Sheikh Abdel Karim Obeid later that same year, and called for Canada to downgrade its relations with the PLO. Unlike some prominent American Jewish groups, the CJC did not openly criticize Israel's response to the First Intifada in this period.

Scheininger praised Canadian Prime Minister Brian Mulroney for his support of the 1991 Gulf War, and described Saddam Hussein's military attacks on Israeli targets as "diabolical". After the war, he criticized External Affairs Minister Joe Clark for advocating further dialogue with the PLO.

Scheininger also called for governments in Canada to prosecute Nazi war criminals and persons who promote hatred toward Jews. He encouraged the Alberta government to initiate a second prosecution against Jim Keegstra in 1991, after Keegstra's first conviction for promoting hatred was quashed.

Scheininger stood down as CJC president in 1992, and was succeeded by Irving Abella. In the late 1990s, he chaired the CJC's international affairs committee. He was awarded the Samuel Bronfman Medal in 1998.

== Politics ==
Scheininger nominated Joe Volpe for the Liberal Party of Canada nomination in Eglinton—Lawrence in the 1988 federal election. Volpe defeated incumbent Member of Parliament Roland de Corneille for the nomination, and was elected in the general election.

Scheininger later defeated former MPP Gino Matrundola, to win the provincial Liberal nomination for Willowdale in the 1995 provincial election. He was defeated by Progressive Conservative incumbent Charles Harnick, as the PCs won a majority government across the province. A 1995 report in the Toronto Star newspaper indicates that he would have been considered for Attorney-General had the Liberals won the election.

== Legal career ==
Scheininger represented Anton Kikaš in a high-profile case in late 1991.

Scheininger previously worked for the firm of Bresver, Grossman, Scheininger & Davis. In 2006, he provided legal counsel to Liberal leadership candidate Joe Volpe, whom he had nominated eighteen years earlier.

== Personal life ==
In 1969 Scheininger married Judy (née Weiss). He has three children—Pamela, Stephanie, and Robbie—and 15 grandchildren.

Preceded by Dorothy Reitman	President of the Canadian Jewish Congress; 1989–1992	Succeeded by Irving Abella
