= Stan Cho =

Canadian politician

The Honourable Stan Cho ECO MPP
- 조성훈
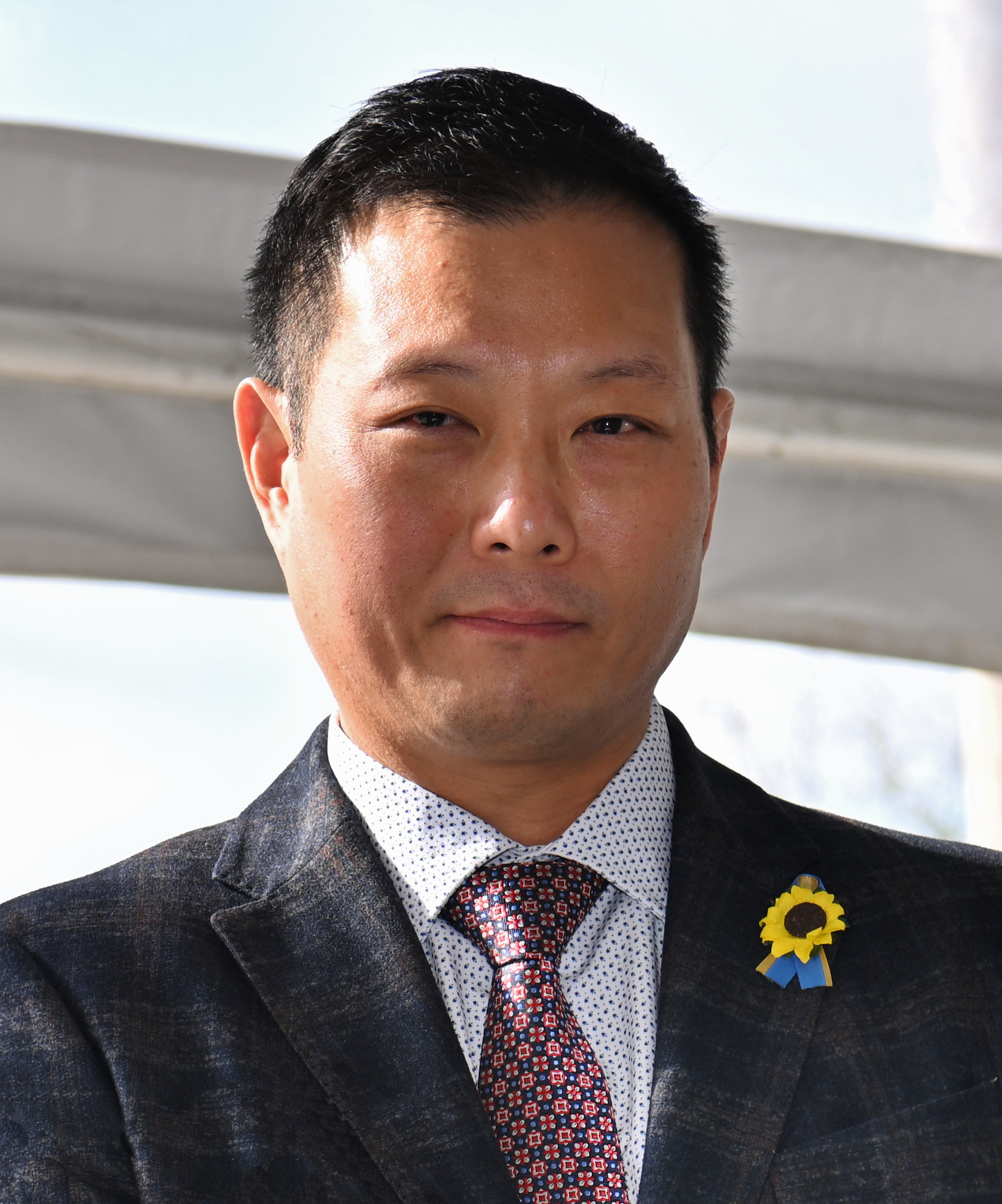
- Cho in 2023

Ontario Minister of Tourism, Culture and Gaming
- In office June 6, 2024 – July 17, 2026
- Premier: Doug Ford
- Preceded by: Neil Lumsden
- Succeeded by: Zee Hamid

Ontario Minister of Long-Term Care
- In office September 4, 2023 – June 6, 2024
- Preceded by: Merrilee Fullerton
- Succeeded by: Natalia Kusendova-Bashta

Ontario Associate Minister of Transportation
- In office June 18, 2021 – September 4, 2023
- Minister: Caroline Mulroney
- Preceded by: Kinga Surma
- Succeeded by: Todd McCarthy

Parliamentary Assistant to the Minister of Finance
- In office June 26, 2019 – December 31, 2020
- Minister: Rod Phillips

Member of the Ontario Provincial Parliament for Willowdale
- Incumbent
- Assumed office June 7, 2018
- Preceded by: David Zimmer

Personal details
- Born: September 14, 1977 (age 49) Etobicoke, Ontario, Canada
- Party: Progressive Conservative
- Education: Trinity College, Toronto
- Occupation: Real Estate Broker and Auditor
- Website: stanchompp.ca

Stan Cho (Korean: 조성훈; born September 14, 1977) is a Canadian politician who has represented the riding of Willowdale in the Legislative Assembly of Ontario since 2018. A member of the Ontario Progressive Conservative (PC) Party, Cho served as the province's minister of tourism, culture and gaming from 2024 to 2026, minister of long-term care from 2023 to 2024 and associate minister of transportation from 2021 to 2023. He resigned as a provincial cabinet minister on July 17, 2026, following public scrutiny of his hotel-related expenses, while remaining a member of Provincial Parliament (MPP).

== Background ==
Cho was born in Etobicoke, Ontario, to an immigrant family from South Korea. They moved to the Willowdale neighbourhood of North York when Cho was eight years old. He holds a degree in philosophy from Trinity College at the University of Toronto. He began his career as an auditor for Mercedes-Benz before entering his family's real estate business. Cho worked as an agent for 15 years before taking over as broker and general manager of their Royal LePage franchise in 2012.

== Political career ==
In 2018, Cho defeated Liberal incumbent David Zimmer, becoming the MPP for Willowdale.

=== Roles held ===
Cho served as Parliamentary Assistant to the President of the Treasury Board, Minister Peter Bethlenfalvy. In the same year, Cho reintroduced Garrett's Legacy Act to the provincial legislature. In 2019, Cho was appointed as the Parliamentary Assistant to the Minister of Finance, Rod Phillips. In 2023, Cho became Minister of Long-Term Care; he would later become Minister of Tourism, Culture and Gaming.

=== Expense scrutiny and resignation from cabinet ===
==== Hotel expenses ====
Between 2023 and 2026, Cho expensed $16,203 to the Ontario Legislature for hotel stays in Toronto, despite his residence being 5.9 kilometres from the Legislative Assembly. Through his office, Cho issued a comment, stating that "[w]hile these expenses meet the criteria for special circumstances as set out by the Legislative Guide for Member’s expenses, I will be personally reimbursing the legislature for any expense that does not meet the spirit of the policy," before later commenting that "I will be personally reimbursing the legislature for the entire amount of the expenses incurred". Cho faced criticism from the opposition, with New Democratic leader Marit Stiles noting that "[you] can get from Willowdale to Queen’s Park without even changing the subway train". Cho was also directed to repay the expenses by Premier Doug Ford, who told him "[you're] paying back every single penny — that’s not the way we operate, simple as that". He delivered his letter of resignation from cabinet, effective immediately, to Premier Ford during the morning of July 17, 2026. Cho stated he will continue to serve as the member for Willowdale.

==== Riding association expenses ====
On July 20, 2026, Global News further reported that Cho also expensed nearly $100,000, between 2023 and 2026 to his riding association, including dinners at steakhouses and lobster restaurants, airline tickets, hotel stays and a limousine rental. Riding associations are funded by private donations to the political party as well as a per-vote subsidy from taxpayers.

== Election results ==
2025 Ontario general election: Willowdale
Party	Candidate	Votes	%	±%
Progressive Conservative	Stan Cho	14,476	46.29	+1.63
Liberal	Paul Saguil	13,871	44.35	+6.39
New Democratic	Boris Ivanov	1,705	5.45	–4.85
Green	Sharolyn Vettese	778	2.49	–1.13
Independent	Lilya Eklishaeva	222	0.71	N/A
Progress	Pit Goyal	221	0.71	N/A
Total valid votes/expense limit		31,273	99.11	–0.07
Total rejected, unmarked and declined ballots		282	0.89	+0.07
Turnout		31,555	37.41	–2.43
Eligible voters		84,340		
Progressive Conservative hold		Swing		▼2.38
Source: Elections Ontario

2022 Ontario general election: Willowdale
Party	Candidate	Votes	%	±%	Expenditures
Progressive Conservative	Stan Cho	14,105	44.66	+1.03	$97,068
Liberal	Paul Saguil	11,990	37.96	+11.36	$98,560
New Democratic	Hal David Berman	3,253	10.30	−15.49	$22,626
Green	Monica Henriques	1,143	3.62	+1.33	$6,722
New Blue	Joanne Csillag	392	1.24		$3,105
Ontario Party	Gian Pietro Arella	338	1.07		$3,678
None of the Above	Ben Barone	104	0.33		$0
Freedom of Choice	Lilya Eklishaeva	98	0.31		$0
Independent	Birinder Singh Ahluwalia	71	0.22		$1,922
Independent	Charles Roddy Sutherland	61	0.19		$0
Populist	Jaime Rodriguez	28	0.09		$0
Total valid votes/expense limit		31,583	99.18	+0.23	$111,919
Total rejected, unmarked, and declined ballots		262	0.82	-0.23	
Turnout		31,845	39.84	-10.68	
Eligible voters		79,541			
Progressive Conservative hold		Swing		−5.16	
Source(s) "Summary of Valid Votes Cast for Each Candidate" (PDF). Elections Ontario. Archived from the original on May 18, 2023. "Statistical Summary by Electoral District" (PDF). Elections Ontario. Archived from the original on May 21, 2023.

2018 Ontario general election: Willowdale
Party	Candidate	Votes	%	±%
Progressive Conservative	Stan Cho	17,732	43.63	+11.69
Liberal	David Zimmer	10,815	26.61	–26.22
New Democratic	Saman Tabasinejad	10,481	25.79	+14.70
Green	Randi Ramdeen	932	2.29	–1.65
Libertarian	Catherine MacDonald-Robertson	453	1.11	N/A
Independent	Birinder S. Ahluwalia	233	0.57	N/A
Total valid votes		40,646	100.0	
Progressive Conservative notional gain from Liberal		Swing		+18.96
Source: Elections Ontario
