= Gino Matrundola =

Canadian politician

Ontario MPP
- In office 1987–1990
- Preceded by: New Riding (Bruce McCaffrey in Armourdale)
- Succeeded by: Charles Harnick
- Constituency: Willowdale

Personal details
- Born: July 21, 1940 (age 85) Cassino, Italy
- Party: Liberal
- Spouse: Mary
- Occupation: Real estate agent
- Portfolio: Deputy Government Whip (1989-1990)

Gino Matrundola (born July 21, 1940) is a former politician in Ontario, Canada. He was a Liberal member of the Legislative Assembly of Ontario from 1987 to 1990. He represented the riding of Willowdale.

== Background ==
Matrundola was born in Cassino, Italy and immigrated to Canada in the 1960s, after a brief stay in Scotland. He was educated at the Italian Polytechnical School in Rome, Italy, and Ryerson Polytechnical Institute in Toronto. He was licensed as a real estate agent in North York, Ontario in 1964, and eventually founded his own realty company. He became an active member of both the Ontario Liberal Party and the Liberal Party of Canada.

== Politics ==
Matrundola won the Ontario Liberal Party nomination in the riding of Armourdale for the 1985 Ontario election, but lost the election to Progressive Conservative incumbent Bruce McCaffrey by 212 votes. The election resulted in David Peterson's Liberals forming a minority government. When the province returned to the polls in 1987, the Liberals won a majority government. Matrundola was elected in the newly created riding of Willowdale, which incorporated much of Armourdale, defeating Progressive Conservative candidate Charles Harnick. Matrundola served as a backbench supporter of the David Peterson government. He was appointed Deputy Government Whip in 1989.

Peterson called an early election in 1990 which resulted in the Liberals being upset by the New Democratic Party. In Willowdale, Matrundola lost to Harnick by 834 votes, marking one of the few gains by Mike Harris's Tories in this election. Matrundola attempted a political comeback but was defeated for the provincial Liberal nomination for the 1995 provincial election by Les Scheininger.

== Later life ==
Matrundola returned to running his real estate firm full-time and remains an active Liberal.
