= Gordon Carton =

Canadian politician (1921–2017)

Ontario MPP
- In office 1963–1975
- Preceded by: New riding
- Succeeded by: Phil Givens
- Constituency: Armourdale

Personal details
- Born: July 14, 1921 Toronto, Ontario, Canada
- Died: April 6, 2017 (aged 95)
- Party: Progressive Conservative
- Spouse: Marjorie Davis
- Children: 2
- Occupation: Business executive

Gordon Robert Carton (July 14, 1921 - April 6, 2017) was a Canadian politician from Ontario. He was a Progressive Conservative member the Legislative Assembly of Ontario from 1963 to 1975 who represented the riding of Armourdale. He served as a cabinet minister in the government of Bill Davis.

== Background ==
Carton was born in Toronto, Ontario in 1921. His parents were Arthur Carton and Lucinda Bain. He was educated at Victoria College where he received a degree in 1946. He went to Osgoode Hall Law School and graduated in 1949. He worked as a lawyer before entering politics. He married Marjorie Davis. Together they raised two daughters Heather and Janice.

== Politics ==
Carton was active in politics his teen years. His first political effort was campaigning on behalf of the first Co-operative Commonwealth Federation MP elected in Ontario, Joe Noseworthy, in 1942.

He was elected in the 1963 provincial election in the new riding of Armourdale where he defeated Liberal candidate Allan Hollingworth. He was re-elected in the general elections in 1967 and 1971.

During his first term as an MPP, Carton criticized the policies of his own government when it came to treating property owners adjacent to new or expanded highways. As a result of an extremely controversial speech he gave in the Ontario Legislature, the government reversed its policies and began to offer compensation to property owners adversely affected by highway construction. Carton supported Bill Davis for the leadership of the Progressive Conservative Party of Ontario in January 1971.

After Davis won the leadership, he appointed Carton as the Minister of Labour from March 1, 1971. He served briefly for two months as Minister of Financial and Commercial Affairs after Arthur Wishart. On February 2, 1972 he was appointed as the Minister of Transportation and Communications. On February 27, 1974, Davis shuffled his Cabinet and Carton was removed from the Transportation portfolio and not given another post. Some argued that this was due to a difference of opinion between Davis and Carton regarding the construction of new expressways in Ontario.

He decided to retire before the 1975 election.

=== Cabinet posts ===
Davis ministry, Province of Ontario (1971–1985)
Cabinet posts (3)
Predecessor	Office	Successor
Charles MacNaughton	Minister of Transportation and Communications; 1972–1974	John Rhodes
Arthur Wishart	Minister of Financial and Commercial Affairs; December 1971 – February 1972	Eric Winkler
Dalton Bales	Minister of Labour; 1971–1972	Fern Guindon

== Later life ==
In 1975, Carton became the Vice-President of Silverwood Dairies Ltd., which later became Silcorp Ltd. In that role, he oversaw the introduction of Baskin-Robbins ice cream to Canada. He created an organization called the Ideal Advisory Board and in 2009 he was appointed to an advisory board for Connexall, a global communications company.
