= Bruce McCaffrey =

Canadian politician

Ontario MPP
- In office 1977–1987
- Preceded by: Philip Givens
- Succeeded by: Riding abolished
- Constituency: Armourdale

Personal details
- Born: Bruce Robert McCaffrey; September 23, 1938 South Porcupine, Ontario
- Died: August 9, 2002 (aged 63)
- Party: Progressive Conservative
- Spouse(s): Ilonka van Steenwyk (div.); Deb Matthews
- Occupation: Teacher, investment consultant

Bruce Robert McCaffrey (September 23, 1938 – August 9, 2002) was a politician in Ontario, Canada. He served in the Legislative Assembly of Ontario from 1977 to 1987 as a Progressive Conservative, and was a cabinet minister in the government of Bill Davis.

== Background ==
McCaffrey was born in South Porcupine, Ontario. He was educated at the University of Toronto. He worked as a teacher, and then entered the investment business. He was first married to Ilonka van Steenwyk with whom he had two children. In 1990, he relocated to London, Ontario where he married Deb Matthews in 1995. McCaffrey and Matthews were separated at the time of his death in 2002.

== Politics ==
In 1968, McCaffrey attempted to win the Progressive Conservative nomination to run in the June federal election but lost to Kechin Wang. Wang went on to lose the election against incumbent Steve Otto.

He was elected to the Ontario legislature in the 1977 provincial election, defeating Liberal candidate Des Newman in the Toronto riding of Armourdale. He was re-elected in 1981 and 1985.

On April 10, 1981, McCaffrey was appointed to Davis's government as a minister without portfolio. On February 13, 1982, he was promoted to Minister of Citizenship and Culture. On July 6, 1983, he was assigned to the post of Provincial Secretary for Social Development. He also served as Minister of Community and Social Services from September 29 to November 21, 1983. He briefly took on the extra responsibility while Frank Drea was hospitalized with circulation problems. On November 24, he was hospitalized for chest pains and he resigned from cabinet on December 23, 1983.

McCaffrey supported Larry Grossman at the Progressive Conservative Party's leadership convention of February 1985. Grossman lost to Frank Miller on the final ballot, and McCaffrey was not appointed to Miller's cabinet.

The Progressive Conservative Party, which had governed Ontario since 1943, was reduced to a precarious minority government in the 1985 provincial election. McCaffrey was narrowly re-elected in Armourdale, defeating Liberal Gino Matrundola by only 122 votes. Following the election, he publicly called on Miller to resign as party leader if the government is defeated on a confidence motion. Miller resigned before the year was over, and Grossman was chosen to take his place in November.

McCaffrey did not seek re-election in the 1987 campaign.

=== Cabinet positions ===
Davis ministry, Province of Ontario (1971–1985)
Cabinet posts (3)
| Predecessor | Office | Successor |
| Margaret Birch | Provincial Secretary for Social Development; 1983 (July–December) | Gordon Dean |
| New Ministry | Minister of Citizenship and Culture; 1982–1983 | Susan Fish |
Sub-Cabinet Post
| Predecessor | Title | Successor |
| | Minister without portfolio (1981–1982) | |

== Later life ==
After leaving politics, he entered graduate studies at the University of Western Ontario. He died in 2002 after a very brief illness, shortly after completing the requirements for a Master of Arts degree in history. The Department of History at the University of Western Ontario now operates a Bruce McCaffrey Memorial Graduate Student Seminar Series named in his honour.
