= Philip Givens =

Canadian politician (1922–1995)

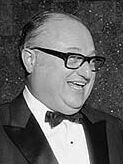

Member of Provincial Parliament
- In office 18 September 1975 – 8 June 1977
- Preceded by: Gordon Carton
- Succeeded by: Bruce McCaffrey
- Constituency: Armourdale
- In office 21 October 1971 – 17 September 1975
- Preceded by: Edward Arunah Dunlop, Jr.
- Succeeded by: Riding abolished
- Constituency: York-Forest Hill

Member of Parliament for York West
- In office 25 June 1968 – 6 October 1971
- Preceded by: Robert Winters
- Succeeded by: James Fleming

54th Mayor of Toronto
- In office 1963–1966
- Preceded by: Donald Dean Summerville
- Succeeded by: William Dennison

Personal details
- Born: Philip Gewirtz; 22 April 1922 Toronto, Ontario
- Died: 30 November 1995 (aged 73) Toronto, Ontario
- Resting place: Beth Tzedec Memorial Park
- Party: Ontario Liberal Party
- Education: Osgoode Law School
- Occupation: Judge
- Profession: Barrister

Philip Gerald Givens, QC (24 April 1922 – 30 November 1995) was a Canadian politician and judge. He was the Mayor of Toronto, a Member of Parliament (MP) and Member of Provincial Parliament (MPP). He was born and raised in Toronto and attended high school at Harbord Collegiate Institute. He studied law at Osgoode Hall Law School and graduated in 1949. He became a judge after leaving politics in the late 1970s. He retired from the judiciary in 1988, and died in Toronto in 1995.

== Life and career ==
Philip Gerald Gewirtz was born on 24 April 1922, in Toronto, Ontario, the son of Mary and Hyman Gewirtz, and was Jewish. A Liberal, Givens was a longtime member of Toronto's city council. As the senior controller on the city's Board of Control, he was appointed Toronto's acting mayor upon the sudden death of the incumbent, Donald Summerville, on November 19, 1963. He served the remaining 13 months in Summerville's two-year term, and then was elected as mayor in the 1964 municipal election.

He led a public campaign to purchase a sculpture by artist Henry Moore, The Archer, for placement in Toronto's Nathan Phillips Square in front of the City Hall. Although vigorously opposed at the time by traditionalists, Givens got his way and the sculpture has become a beloved piece of public art. The controversy had a political cost, however, and Givens was defeated when he ran for re-election as mayor in 1966.

Toward the end of his term in office, he appeared in the feature film The Offering as himself.

Givens ran for the House of Commons of Canada in the 1957 and 1958 federal elections, but was defeated in his bid to become Member of Parliament for Spadina. He was finally elected to Parliament in the 1968 election from the York West electoral district in suburban Toronto. In 1971 he resigned from the House of Commons before his term was completed. He then ran in the 1971 Ontario provincial election for the Ontario Liberal Party in the Ontario Legislative Assembly's York-Forest Hill constituency. He won the close three-way race by promising to support the completion of the Spadina Expressway (Allen Road) on the constituency's western border. His constituency was abolished in the 1975 electoral district boundary redistribution. In the 1975 provincial election he was elected again as a Member of Provincial Parliament (MPP) in the Armourdale constituency. He defeated future Toronto mayor (and then-Mayor of North York) Mel Lastman. After retiring from politics in 1977, Givens was given a judicial appointment and was made chairman of the Metropolitan Toronto Police Commission.

== Legacy ==
The city of Toronto renamed Caribou Park as Phil Givens Park in 2016.

== Electoral record ==
1968 Canadian federal election: York West
Party	Candidate	Votes	%	±%
Liberal	Philip Givens	20,416	44.8	-2.9
New Democratic	Val Scott	16,204	35.6	+12.7
Progressive Conservative	Wes Boddington	8,344	18.3	-11.2
Independent	Norman Gunn	442	1.0	
Communist	William Kashtan	155	0.3	
Total valid votes		45,561	100.0	

== Citations ==
Political offices
Preceded by Charles O. Bick	Metropolitan Toronto Police Commission Chairman; 1977–1985	Succeeded by Clare Westcott
