= Dorothy Reitman =

Canadian philanthropist and activist

Dorothy Reitman, CM (born 1932) is a Canadian philanthropist and activist who served as the first female president of the Canadian Jewish Congress (CJC) from the year 1986 to 1989.

== Early life ==
Reitman's parents emigrated from Odessa in her infancy. She attended McGill University and in 1952, married Cyril Reitman of the Reitmans retailing family; She was widowed in 2014.

In 1958, her infant son, Joel, was kidnapped by his nanny who held him for $10,000 ransom resulting in the Reitmans going on the radio pleading for his return. Joel Reitman was found unharmed and the nanny was captured and sentenced to seven years in prison.

== Philanthropic and advocacy work ==
She took up a number of philanthropic and social causes and was a founding member of the Portage Program for Drug Dependency, served on the board of the Match International Centre, and through the organization worked on a program to help women in Kenya, the Council of Canadian Unity, and Auberge Shalom for Battered Women. She also helped establish Kosher Meals on Wheels in Montreal.

Among the chairmanships she has held are the honorary chair of the McGill University Centre for Research and Teaching for Women, co-chair of the Canadian Conference of Christians and Jews, chair of the Commonwealth Jewish Foundation of Canada, vice-president of the Commonwealth Jewish Council, and trustee of the Commonwealth Jewish Trust. She also served as president of the National Council of Jewish Women of Canada from 1975 to 1977 and participated in the United Nations' World Conference on Women, 1985 at Nairobi as a World Jewish Congress delegate.

The Cyril and Dorothy, Joel and Jill Reitman Alzheimer Support Centre at Mount Sinai Hospital in Toronto is named after her and her family's charitable support. Her family makes charitable donations through The Cyril & Dorothy, Joel & Jill Reitman Family Foundation.

== Canadian Jewish Congress ==
Reitman defeated Moshe Ronen, who would later win the position, for the CJC presidency in 1986. In 1989, she spoke out in defence of Jewish women who had been attacked by male co-religionists while trying to pray at the Western Wall in Jerusalem. She also advocated on behalf of Soviet Jewish refuseniks attempting to leave the Soviet Union in the 1980s. As CJC President she also opposed increased restrictions by the Canadian government on the ability of refugees to enter Canada.

== Honours and awards ==
Reitman won the Montreal Jewish Community Leadership Award in 1965 and received the Queen Elizabeth II Silver Jubilee Medal in 1977.

In 1992, she was awarded the Governor General's Awards in Commemoration of the Persons Case for having "advocated women's equality and opened roads to their empowerment." Five years later, she was inducted into the Order of Canada in recognition for her volunteer work assisting women as well as with the Jewish community.

Preceded by Milton E. Harris	President of the Canadian Jewish Congress; 1986-1989	Succeeded by Les Scheininger
