= Milton Harris (professor) =

American economist

Milton Harris is an American mathematician and economist and is the Chicago Board of Trade Professor of Finance and Economics Emeritus at The University of Chicago Booth School of Business. Harris is an expert in the fields of corporate finance, corporate contract law, and applied economics. He is particularly interested in the economic theory of information and its effect on the firm and on organizations in general, and has done fundamental research in these areas.

Harris began his career in mathematics. He graduated from Rice University in 1968 with a degree in mathematics and went on to practice as a mathematician at the U.S. Naval Research Laboratory before returning to an academic career. He earned his A.M. in 1973 at the University of Chicago in 1973 and completed his Ph.D. under supervisor William A. Brock in 1974.

Harris taught at a variety of academic institutions before moving to the University of Chicago. He was the Nathan and Mary Sharp Professor of Finance and Professor of Managerial Economics and Decision Science at the Kellogg School of Management at Northwestern University from 1983 to 1987. He was also the director of the Ph.D. program there during that time.

Harris joined The Booth School of Business in 1987. He was the Associate Dean of Ph.D. Studies from 1997 to 2004. He is a fellow of the Econometric Society and the American Finance Association.
