= Duty solicitor =

A duty solicitor, duty counsel, or duty lawyer, is a solicitor whose services are available to a person either suspected of, or charged with, a criminal offence free of charge, if that person does not have access to a solicitor of their own and usually if it is judged by a means test that they cannot afford one. The system is operative in several Commonwealth countries, including the United Kingdom, Australia, New Zealand and Canada.

These solicitors are generally in private practice, in contrast to the public defender system in the United States where an attorney employed directly by the state will be assigned to handle the case from pre-trial to potentially appeal. Similar schemes in the UK are the Public Defender Service in a few centres across England and Wales, and the Public Defence Solicitors' Office for Scotland.

== United Kingdom ==
=== England and Wales ===
In England and Wales, there are two duty solicitor schemes, which operate in parallel. The police station duty solicitor scheme enables a person who is arrested on suspicion of a criminal offence to consult with a solicitor, either in person or on the telephone (and frequently both) whilst in police custody. This right is most often taken up when the suspect is to be interviewed concerning their suspected involvement in the commission of a crime.

The court duty solicitor scheme allows a person that has already been charged with an offence to consult with and be represented by a solicitor at the magistrates' court on their first appearance if they do not have, or simply have not contacted, their own solicitor. The right to see the duty solicitor applies equally to those defendants who are in custody or on bail, but the right is not unlimited – if the defendant is on bail and is charged with an offence that does not carry a sentence of imprisonment the duty solicitor is not permitted to act. A client is only permitted to take advantage of duty solicitor assistance on one occasion in respect to each matter charged. This contrasts with the right to advice from the duty solicitor whilst at the police station, which applies irrespective of what the alleged offence may be, and will last for the duration of any investigation. Some matters have been largely taken outside of the duty solicitor scheme at the police station due to the advent of Criminal Defence Service Direct, a telephone advice service that deals with many minor offences where an interview will not take place.

The duty solicitor schemes in England and Wales are managed by the Legal Aid Agency. Each magistrates' court that operates such a scheme will have one or more solicitors allocated to any given court session. The police station schemes have one or more solicitors on duty for each police station, or police area (occasionally covering a number of police stations), depending on how busy the scheme. The busiest schemes in the country can have a number of solicitors on duty at any one time. The Central Manchester scheme for example has four solicitors on duty at any one time.

To act as a duty solicitor a solicitor must be a member of the Law Society's Criminal Litigation Accreditation Scheme. To become a member of the scheme a solicitor must demonstrate a particular level of competence set by the Law Society. To demonstrate competence, a solicitor must pass a number of assessments.

In England and Wales, there is a chronic shortage of duty solicitors, with nearly half of them being over 50 and due to retire soon, according to the Law Society in 2018.

The Public Defender Service has existed since 2001, a department of the Legal Aid Agency, an executive agency of the Ministry of Justice. It has four offices across England and Wales.

=== Scotland ===
The duty solicitor scheme in Scotland is run by the Scottish Legal Aid Board (SLAB), although this being largely supplanted by the Public Defence Solicitors' Office (PDSO). The PDSO is a not-for-profit organisation funded through SLAB.

== Canada ==
In Canada, duty counsel perform functions that would, in the British system, be performed by barristers and by solicitors. The duty counsel is paid by an agency of the provincial government (for example, Legal Aid Ontario) who provides limited legal services in criminal, family law and child protection matters to people who are currently under arrest, or who arrive at court without representation, mainly in the Ontario Court of Justice.

The Duty Counsel lawyer is often the first point of contact for legal advice provided to a detained or arrested individual. People arrested by police services across the province of Ontario, as well as by Canada Border Services Agency officers at land, air, and sea ports of entry in Ontario also have the right to contact Duty Counsel. Any person arrested or detained in Canada has the right to speak to a lawyer without delay (with very narrow exceptions), and the police are required to inform them of that right, and facilitate access to a lawyer. The Duty Counsel system is the way in which these rights are implemented in Ontario.

Duty Counsel lawyers may serve as the arrested person's representative to the court on an ad-hoc basis, unless the accused has secured other legal advice.

Legal Aid Ontario employs both staff, and per diem lawyers (private bar members who work part-time) as duty counsel. Most lawyers providing telephone duty counsel services to arrestees and detainees are private bar lawyers contracted by a private firm to provide service on behalf of Legal Aid Ontario. Some of these private contractor lawyers work a few shifts a month in addition to their own work in private practice in order to serve the community. Others work on a full-time basis with the company under contract to Legal Aid Ontario.

Duty counsel is also available in family law and child protection cases. Duty counsel will advise clients and sometimes speak for them in court, but will not take on cases in the long-term. They can also assist with paperwork and, depending on the court, attend case conferences with clients.

== Other countries ==
In Australia, duty solicitors are sometimes called duty lawyers, and are provided to disadvantaged people through statutory authorities known as Legal Aid Commissions (LACs) in the relevant state or territory.

The United States and Brazil employ a public defender system with nearly identical duties, representing an indigent client from custodial questioning, to charge, trial, sentence, and appeal.

== See also ==
- Amicus curiae ("friend of the court")
- McKenzie friend
- Public defender
