= Online Justice Journeys (Rechtwijzer or MyLawBC) =

Online Justice (OJ or Rechtwijzer or MyLawBC) is an online dispute resolution (ODR) platform. The OJ technology was the first ODR distributor to succeed in adapting ODR for relation disputes like divorce and landlord-tenant issues.

OJ's first application was the Dutch Rechtwijzer in 2007. The founding organisation of the OJ technology - HiiL - developed it in conjunction with the Dutch Legal Aid Board, Ministry of Security and Justice, and Modria. Earlier versions were developed at Tilburg University under the leadership of Corry van Zeeland. Later, OJ director Jin Ho Verdonschot, together with Maurits Barendrecht, who is the research director at HiiL, designed the current Rechtwijzer and OJ technology - through a co-creation process with a broad group of judges, lawyers, mediators, social psychologists, business model experts, software developers, UI designers, and policy makers.

== Platforms ==
OJ technology currently powers platforms for divorce in the Netherlands (Rechtwijzer with the Dutch Legal Aid Board), British Columbia (MyLawBC with the Legal Services Society of BC) and the United Kingdom (with Relate). Additionally, there are landlord-tenant disputes and a debts restructuring version running in the Netherlands.

The process in all the OJ platforms has three stages with two main components. First, the optional diagnosis, which is a guided pathway to information and advice to those considering separation. Then there is the mandatory intake, where a series of questions are answered to establish the needs, interests and first thoughts, in terms of solutions, for both parties. This is followed by the mandatory dialogue, where both parties collaborate on model solutions step by step to complete their agreement. There is the optional help phase, where any of the two parties can request mediation or adjudication services. Last, is the mandatory review, which is done by a certified legal professional to establish the fairness of the agreement.

== See also ==
- Divorce in the United Kingdom
- Divorce in Canada
