= Charles Harnick =

Canadian politician

The Honourable Charles Harnick KC ECO
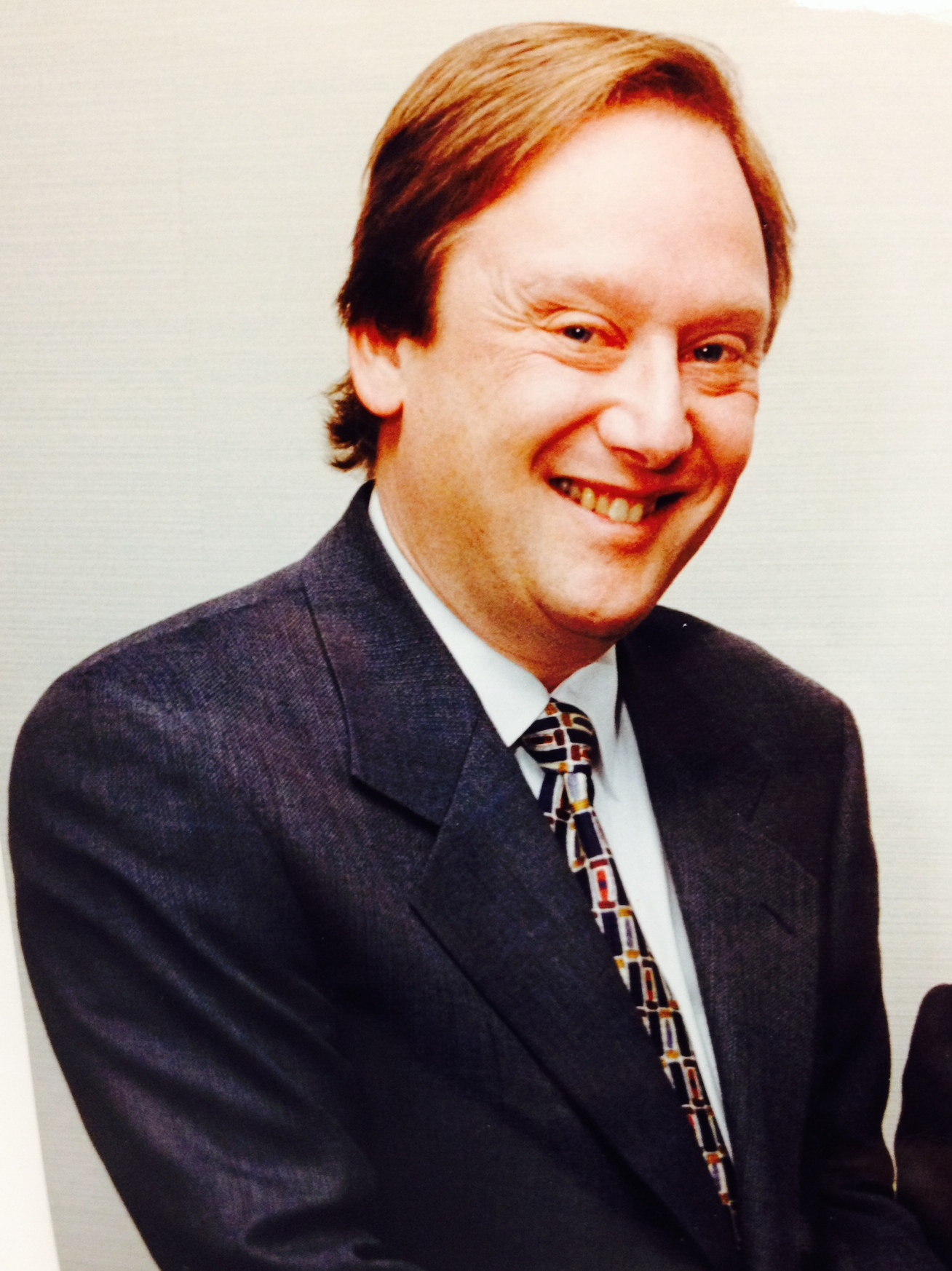

Ontario MPP
- In office 1990–1999
- Preceded by: Gino Matrundola
- Succeeded by: David Young
- Constituency: Willowdale

Personal details
- Born: October 14, 1950 (age 75) Toronto, Ontario
- Party: Progressive Conservative
- Occupation: Lawyer

Charles Alan Harnick, KC (born October 14, 1950) is a former politician in Ontario, Canada. He was a Progressive Conservative member of the Legislative Assembly of Ontario from 1990 to 1999, and served as a senior cabinet minister in the government of Mike Harris.

== Background ==
Harnick has a Bachelor of Arts degree from York University, and a law degree from the University of Windsor. He was called to the bar in 1977, and worked as a civil litigation lawyer with the firm of Feigman and Chernos and with the firm of Malach and Fidler before entering political life. Harnick was certified as a Specialist in Civil Litigation in 1991; he was appointed a Queen's Counsel in 1992 and in 2005 he was awarded the Law Society Medal. He has also been a member of the Canadian Jewish Congress and B'nai Brith.

== Politics ==
Harnick ran for the Ontario legislature in the 1987 provincial legislature, losing to Liberal Gino Matrundola by 4,034 votes in the North York riding of Willowdale. He ran in the same riding in the 1990 election, and defeated Matrundola by 834 votes.

The Progressive Conservatives won a majority government in the 1995 provincial election, and Harnick was re-elected in Willowdale by a landslide. He was appointed Attorney General and Minister responsible for Native Affairs on June 26, 1995.

As Attorney General, he presided over a series of cuts to legal services enacted by the Harris government. These cuts were criticized for reducing legal services available to women in vulnerable domestic situations. He also reduced civilian oversight of Toronto's police services, and called for a restoration of capital punishment.

In June 1996, Harnick was asked in the legislature to comment about a racist remark that Premier Mike Harris had allegedly made regarding the Ipperwash crisis. Opposition NDP member Bud Wildman asked him, "[W]ho, if anyone, said 'get the fucking Indians out of the park'?" Harnick replied, "I can tell you I have no information as to the fact that remark was ever made. I have no knowledge that remark was ever made." The next day he said, "I have found no one who knows anything about that particular comment. That's all I have to say."

At the Ipperwash Inquiry in 2005, Harnick said Harris had in fact uttered the phrase that Wildman asked about in 1996. Harnick admitted that he had lied to the legislature out of loyalty and friendship to Harris, adding that he was under oath at the inquiry, not in the legislature."

Harnick was responsible for the creation of the Ontario Mandatory Mediation Program and Legal Aid Ontario. Harnick spent several years as a land claim negotiator and he is a trained and accomplished mediator. He was instrumental in bringing the major legal organizations in Ontario together with paralegal organizations, culminating in legislation that has made the Law Society of Upper Canada the regulator of paralegal activities. He did not run for re-election in 1999.

=== Cabinet positions ===
Harris ministry, Province of Ontario (1995–2002)
Cabinet post (1)
Predecessor	Office	Successor
Marion Boyd	Attorney General; 1995–1999 also Responsible for Native Affairs	Jim Flaherty

== Later life ==
Harnick is a founding Principal of Counsel Public Affairs Inc. He is a former board member and Vice Chairman of St. John's Rehabilitation Hospital and he is an ex officio Bencher of the Law Society of Upper Canada. He is the Senior Adjudicative Officer of the General Insurance Ombudservice, an independent service that adjudicates disputes between consumers and member insurance companies. He served as chair of the Police Costing Review committee in Toronto, and has been involved in negotiations relating to aboriginal self-government.
