= Patrick Muttart =

Deputy Chief of Staff to the Prime Minister of Canada
- In office 2006–2009
- Prime Minister: Stephen Harper

Personal details
- Born: February 17, 1972 (age 54) Woodstock, Ontario
- Education: University of Ottawa
- Occupation: Political Strategist Business Executive

Patrick Muttart (born February 17, 1972) is a Canadian political strategist and business executive based in the Philippines. He was one of the key operatives behind the Conservative Party of Canada and former Prime Minister Stephen Harper's rise to power. In recent years he has worked across Asia-Pacific for Philip Morris International.

== Career ==
Muttart entered conservative politics after working for the public relations firm Navigator Ltd, and he is considered a major figure behind Stephen Harper's victory in the 2006 Canadian federal election. Harper's deputy chief of staff Muttart played a major role shaping the Conservative Government's policy agenda and communications strategy. He was the architect of Conservative Party ad campaigns targeting former Liberal Party of Canada leaders Stephane Dion and Michael Ignatieff. Muttart left Harper's office in 2009. He continues to comment on current events.

At the provincial level in Canada Muttart has worked for Saskatchewan Party and Progressive Conservative Party of Ontario candidates. Outside North America he has campaigned for the centre-right Liberal Party of Australia. He is considered an expert on the behaviour and attitudes of working class voters in English-speaking countries. Muttart's collaboration with centre-right parties has been cited as an example of global knowledge transfer between conservative campaign officials.

=== Philip Morris International ===
At Philip Morris International Muttart has publicly advocated for the company's "smoke-free" transformation which includes converting smokers to electronic cigarettes and other non burning tobacco products. He told Australia's ABC: "If I was working for a company or industry that was free of controversy, I think I'd be bored."

=== Criticism from the left ===
New Democratic Party strategist Brian Topp, a former union official, has accused Muttart of advocating strategies that manipulate working class voters into voting against their own economic and social best interests.

=== 2011 campaign controversy ===
During the final week of the 2011 Canadian election, Pierre Karl Péladeau, CEO of Sun Media Corporation who would later become leader of the Parti Québécois, accused Muttart of attempting to undermine Sun Media by giving a fake photograph of Ignatieff to a Sun executive. Mercury LLC, Muttart's employer, called Peladeau's assertion "false and downright bizarre". The Conservative campaign denied Muttart had behaved improperly but distanced itself from the controversy by announcing Muttart would have "no further role" in the election. Muttart was reportedly furious.
