= Milton E. Harris =

Canadian businessman

- Born: July 26, 1927; Detroit, Michigan, U.S.
- Died: May 26, 2005 (aged 77); Toronto, Ontario, Canada
- Education: University of Toronto
- Known for: Founder of Harris Steel Group
- Spouse: Ethel Harris
- Children: 3

Milton E. Harris, OC (July 26, 1927 – March 26, 2005) was an American-born Canadian businessman and founder of Harris Steel Group.

Born in Detroit, Michigan, to Sam and Jenny Harris, he moved to London, Ontario, when he was a few months old. Harris attended St. George's School and Central Collegiate Institute before receiving a Bachelor of Commerce degree from the University of Toronto in 1949. After his father suffered a heart attack, Harris took over the day-to-day operation of his family's metals trading business established by his great-grandfather in 1886. He founded Harris Steel Group in 1954 in London, Ontario.

Harris was president of the Canadian Jewish Congress from 1983 to 1986. In 1986 he was made an Officer of the Order of Canada in recognition for having "devoted his energies to community service at various levels, endeavouring to improve the quality of life for all Canadians".

== Personal life ==
In 1949, he married Ethel whom he met at the University of Toronto. They had three children – Judith, Naomi and David. Milton Harris died in 2005 of abdominal cancer in Toronto, aged 77.

Preceded by Irwin Cotler	President of the Canadian Jewish Congress; 1983–1986	Succeeded by Dorothy Reitman
