= Willowdale (provincial electoral district) =

Provincial electoral district in Ontario, Canada

Coordinates: 43.778°N 79.416°W

Ontario electoral district
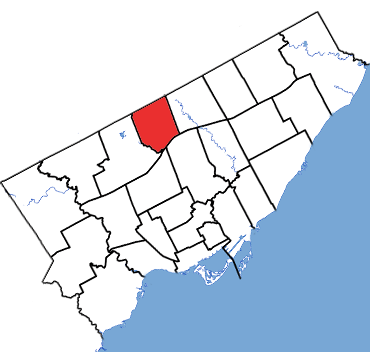
- Willowdale in relation to the other Toronto ridings (2015 boundaries)

Provincial electoral district
- Legislature: Legislative Assembly of Ontario
MPP
Stan Cho
Progressive Conservative
- District created: 1987
- First contested: 1987
- Last contested: 2025

Demographics
- Population (2021): 118,218
- Electors (2022): 79,942
- Area (km²): 20
- Pop. density (per km²): 5,910.9
- Census division: Toronto
- Census subdivision: Toronto

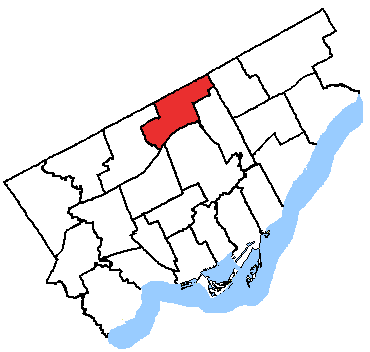
Willowdale from 2003 to 2018

Willowdale is a provincial electoral district in Toronto, Ontario, Canada. It elects one member to the Legislative Assembly of Ontario. It was created in 1987.

== History ==
From 1987 to 1999, its boundaries were Bathurst Street to Finch Avenue to Yonge Street to Steeles Avenue to Leslie Street to the 401.

In 1996, it was redefined to consist of the part of the city of North York bounded on the north by the city limits (Steeles Avenue), and on the east, south and west by a line drawn from the city limits south along the eastern limit of the city, west along the hydro-electric transmission line situated south of McNicoll Avenue, south along Highway 404, west along Finch Avenue East, south along the Don River East Branch, west along Highway 401, northwest along the Don River West Branch, north along Bathurst Street, east along Drewry Avenue, north along Chelmsford Avenue, west along Greenwin Village Road, and north along Village Gate to the northern city limit.

From 2003 to 2018, it consisted of the part of the city of Toronto bounded on the north by the northern city limit (Steeles Avenue), and on the east, south and west by a line drawn from the city limit south along Victoria Park Avenue, southwest along the hydroelectric transmission line situated north of Apache Trail, south along Highway 404, west along Finch Avenue East, south along Leslie Street, southwest along Highway 401, northwest along the Don River West Branch, northeast along Bathurst Street, east along the hydroelectric transmission line situated north of Finch Avenue West and north along Yonge Street to the city limit.

This riding lost territory (36%) to Don Valley North, and gained territory from York Centre (16%) during the 2012 electoral redistribution.

== Members of Provincial Parliament ==
Sourced from the Ontario Legislative Assembly

Willowdale
Assembly	Years	Member	Party
Riding created
34th	1987–1990	Gino Matrundola	Liberal
35th	1990–1995	Charles Harnick	Progressive Conservative
36th	1995–1999	Charles Harnick	Progressive Conservative
37th	1999–2003	David Young	Progressive Conservative
38th	2003–2007	David Zimmer	Liberal
39th	2007–2011	David Zimmer	Liberal
40th	2011–2014	David Zimmer	Liberal
41st	2014–2018	David Zimmer	Liberal
42nd	2018–2022	Stan Cho	Progressive Conservative
43rd	2022–2025	Stan Cho	Progressive Conservative
44th	2025–present	Stan Cho	Progressive Conservative

== Election results ==
Winning party in each polling division of Willowdale at the 2025 Ontario general election

2025 Ontario general election
Party	Candidate	Votes	%	±%
Progressive Conservative	Stan Cho	14,476	46.29	+1.63
Liberal	Paul Saguil	13,871	44.35	+6.39
New Democratic	Boris Ivanov	1,705	5.45	–4.85
Green	Sharolyn Vettese	778	2.49	–1.13
Independent	Lilya Eklishaeva	222	0.71	N/A
Progress	Pit Goyal	221	0.71	N/A
Total valid votes/expense limit		31,273	99.11	–0.07
Total rejected, unmarked and declined ballots		282	0.89	+0.07
Turnout		31,555	37.41	–2.43
Eligible voters		84,340		
Progressive Conservative hold		Swing		–2.38
Source: Elections Ontario

Winning party in each polling division of Willowdale at the 2022 Ontario general election

2022 Ontario general election
Party	Candidate	Votes	%	±%	Expenditures
Progressive Conservative	Stan Cho	14,105	44.66	+1.03	$97,068
Liberal	Paul Saguil	11,990	37.96	+11.36	$98,560
New Democratic	Hal David Berman	3,253	10.30	−15.49	$22,626
Green	Monica Henriques	1,143	3.62	+1.33	$6,722
New Blue	Joanne Csillag	392	1.24		$3,105
Ontario Party	Gian Pietro Arella	338	1.07		$3,678
None of the Above	Ben Barone	104	0.33		$0
Freedom of Choice	Lilya Eklishaeva	98	0.31		$0
Independent	Birinder Singh Ahluwalia	71	0.22		$1,922
Independent	Charles Roddy Sutherland	61	0.19		$0
Populist	Jaime Rodriguez	28	0.09		$0
Total valid votes/expense limit		31,583	99.18	+0.23	$111,919
Total rejected, unmarked, and declined ballots		262	0.82	-0.23	
Turnout		31,845	39.84	-10.68	
Eligible voters		79,541			
Progressive Conservative hold		Swing		−5.16	
Source(s) "Summary of Valid Votes Cast for Each Candidate" (PDF). Elections Ontario. Archived from the original on May 18, 2023. "Statistical Summary by Electoral District" (PDF). Elections Ontario. Archived from the original on May 21, 2023.

2018 Ontario general election
Party	Candidate	Votes	%	±%
Progressive Conservative	Stan Cho	17,732	43.63	+11.69
Liberal	David Zimmer	10,815	26.61	–26.22
New Democratic	Saman Tabasinejad	10,481	25.79	+14.70
Green	Randi Ramdeen	932	2.29	–1.65
Libertarian	Catherine MacDonald-Robertson	453	1.11	N/A
Independent	Birinder S. Ahluwalia	233	0.57	N/A
Total valid votes		40,646	100.0	
Progressive Conservative notional gain from Liberal		Swing		+18.96
Source: Elections Ontario

2014 general election redistributed results
Party	Vote	%
Liberal	17,637	52.83
Progressive Conservative	10,665	31.94
New Democratic	3,701	11.09
Green	1,315	3.94
Others	68	0.20

2014 Ontario general election
Party	Candidate	Votes	%	±%
Liberal	David Zimmer	24,300	52.58	+1.74
Progressive Conservative	Michael Ceci	15,468	33.47	-0.13
New Democratic	Alexander Brown	4,693	10.15	-2.70
Green	Teresa Pun	1,758	3.80	+1.78
Total valid votes		46,219	100.0	
Liberal hold		Swing		+0.94
Source: Elections Ontario

2011 Ontario general election
Party	Candidate	Votes	%	±%
Liberal	David Zimmer	21,984	50.84	+3.13
Progressive Conservative	Vince Agovino	14,528	33.60	-1.32
New Democratic	Alexander Brown	5,556	12.85	+4.35
Green	Michael Vettese	874	2.02	-4.59
Freedom	Amy Brown	297	0.69	
Total valid votes		43,239	100.00	
Total rejected, unmarked and declined ballots		203	0.47	
Turnout		43,442	45.40	
Eligible voters		95,694		
Liberal hold		Swing		+2.23
Source: Elections Ontario

2007 Ontario general election
Party	Candidate	Votes	%	±%
Liberal	David Zimmer	21,166	47.73	+0.76
Progressive Conservative	David Shiner	15,558	35.08	-7.93
New Democratic	Rini Ghosh	3,699	8.34	+1.70
Green	Torbjorn Zetterlund	2,960	6.67	+4.66
Libertarian	Heath Thomas	477	1.08	
Family Coalition	Kristin Monster	370	0.83	-0.12
Independent	Charles Roddy Sutherland	119	0.27	
Total valid votes		44,349	100.00	

2003 Ontario general election
Party	Candidate	Votes	%	±%
Liberal	David Zimmer	21,823	46.97	+4.69
Progressive Conservative	David Young	19,957	42.95	-7.57
New Democratic	Yvonne Bobb	3,084	6.64	+2.38
Green	Sharolyn Vettese	933	2.01	+1.26
Family Coalition	Rina Morra	442	0.95	+ 0.02
Freedom	Vaughan Byrnes	227	0.49	+0.14
Total valid votes		46,466	100.00	

1999 Ontario general election
Party	Candidate	Votes	%	±%
Progressive Conservative	David Young	22,200	50.52	-3.47
Liberal	Fahimeh Mortazavi	18,579	42.28	+13.99
New Democratic	Mikael A. Swayze	1,871	4.26	-9.57
Family Coalition	Jim Conrad	409	0.93	
Green	Elizabeth Rhodes	330	0.75	-0.36
Independent	Bernadette Michael	323	0.74	
Freedom	Vaughan Byrnes	152	0.35	
Natural Law	Claude Viau	75	0.17	
Total valid votes		43,939	100.00	

1995 Ontario general election
Party	Candidate	Votes	%	±%
Progressive Conservative	Charles Harnick	18,834	53.99	+18.77
Liberal	Les Scheininger	9,870	28.29	-4.48
New Democratic	Julie McCrea	4,825	13.83	-13.05
Independent	Frank Zeppieri	715	2.05	
Green	Laura Weinberg	386	1.11	
Natural Law	Michael Beifuss	253	0.73	
Total valid votes		34,883	100.00	

1990 Ontario general election
Party	Candidate	Votes	%	±%
Progressive Conservative	Charles Harnick	11,957	35.22	+1.18
Liberal	Gino Matrundola	11,123	32.77	-13.20
New Democratic	Batya Hebdon	9,125	26.88	+9.8
Family Coalition	Mark Vosylius	1,074	3.16	
Libertarian	Earl Epstein	668	1.97	-0.94
Total valid votes		33,947	100.00	

1987 Ontario general election
Party	Candidate	Votes	%
Liberal	Gino Matrundola	15,543	45.97
Progressive Conservative	Charles Harnick	11,509	34.04
New Democratic	Batya Hebdon	5,774	17.08
Libertarian	Earl Epstein	985	2.91
Total valid votes		33,811	100.00

== 2007 electoral reform referendum ==
2007 Ontario electoral reform referendum
Side	Votes	%
First Past the Post	25,491	59.6
Mixed member proportional	17,281	40.4
Total valid votes	42,772	100.0

== See also ==
- List of Ontario provincial electoral districts
- Canadian provincial electoral districts
