= Government House Leader (Ontario) =

Canadian provincial cabinet minister

The Ontario Government House Leader is the provincial cabinet minister responsible for planning and managing the government's legislative program in the Legislative Assembly of Ontario. The position is not legally entitled to cabinet standing on its own so Government House Leaders may simultaneously hold another portfolio or be specifically designated as a minister without portfolio to participate in cabinet.

House Leaders at the federal level are often granted sinecure assignments to give them cabinet standing while allowing them to focus exclusively on house business. This has not been the case at the provincial level. In recent years, John Baird and Dwight Duncan have served as Government House Leaders while simultaneously holding the high-profile Minister of Energy position.

The current Government House Leader is Steve Clark (as of June 6, 2024).

== Government House Leaders ==
1983–present
Name	Tenure	Concurrent ministry
Steve Clark	June 6, 2024 – present	Parliamentary Assistant to the Premier (October 2024–present)
Paul Calandra	June 20, 2019 – June 6, 2024	Minister of Municipal Affairs and Housing (2023–present) Minister of Long-Term Care (2022–2023) Minister Without Portfolio (2019-2022)
Todd Smith	June 29, 2018 – June 20, 2019	Minister of Government and Consumer Services
Yasir Naqvi	June 24, 2014 – June 29, 2018	Attorney General; Minister of Community Safety and Correctional Services
John Milloy	October 20, 2011 – June 24, 2014	Minister of Community and Social Services; Minister of Government Services; Minister of Training, Colleges & Universities
Monique Smith	February 4, 2009 – October 6, 2011	Minister of Intergovernmental Affairs; Minister of Tourism
Michael Bryant	October 30, 2007 – February 4, 2009	Minister of Economic Development; Minister of Aboriginal Affairs
Jim Bradley	October 11, 2005 – September 10, 2007	Minister of Tourism; Minister Responsible for Seniors
Dwight Duncan	October 23, 2003 – October 11, 2005	Minister of Energy
John Baird	June 17, 2003 – September 2, 2003	Minister of Energy; Minister Responsible for Francophone Affairs
Chris Stockwell	April 15, 2002 – June 17, 2003	Minister of the Environment
Janet Ecker	February 8, 2001 – April 14, 2002	Minister of Education
Norm Sterling	37th Parliament; June 17, 1999 – February 8, 2001; 36th Parliament; October 10, 1997 – May 5, 1999	37th Parliament; Minister of Correctional Services; Minister of Intergovernmental Affairs; 36th Parliament; Minister of the Environment
David Johnson	August 16, 1996 – October 10, 1997	Minister of Health; Interim
Ernie Eves	June 26, 1995 – August 16, 1996	Minister of Finance; Deputy Premier
Dave Cooke	July 31, 1991 – April 28, 1995	Minister of Municipal Affairs (1991–1993); Minister of Education (1993–1995)
Shelley Martel	October 1, 1990 – July 31, 1991	Minister of Northern Development
Chris Ward	August 2, 1989 – August 2, 1990	Minister of Government Services
Sean Conway	September 29, 1987 – August 2, 1989	Minister of Mines
Robert Nixon	June 26, 1985 – July 31, 1987	Minister of Revenue; Minister of Economics; Treasurer; Successor Ministries to the Minister of Finance
Larry Grossman	May 17, 1985 – June 26, 1985	Minister of Education; Minister of Colleges and Universities; Provincial Secretary for Social Development
Bob Welch	February 20, 1985 – May 1, 1985	Deputy Premier; Attorney General
Thomas Wells	December 23, 1983 – February 8, 1985	Minister of Intergovernmental Affairs

== See also ==
- Government House Leader for the equivalent position in the federal House of Commons
- House Leader
