= Legal Aid Ontario =

Canadian provincial legal aid organization

Legal Aid Ontario (LAO)

Agency overview
- Formed: 1998
- Preceding agency: Ontario Legal Aid Plan (OLAP)
- Type: Legal aid provision
- Jurisdiction: Ontario
- Headquarters: 20 Dundas Street West Toronto, Ontario
- Employees: 501–1000
- Annual budget: $432.6 m CAN (2016).
- Agency executive: Aileen Page, President and CEO
- Parent agency: Ministry of Attorney General
- Website: http://legalaid.on.ca

Legal Aid Ontario (LAO) is a publicly funded and publicly accountable non-profit corporation, responsible for administering the legal aid program in the province of Ontario, Canada. Through a toll-free number and multiple in-person locations such as courthouse offices, duty counsel and community legal clinics, the organization provides more than one million assists to low-income Ontario residents each year.

== Legal help available ==
Established in 1998 through the Legal Aid Services Act and successor to the Ontario Legal Aid Plan (OLAP), Legal Aid Ontario provides legal aid services to low-income individuals in the province of Ontario through duty counsel, community legal clinics, public legal education, summary legal advice, alternative dispute resolution, self-help materials and legal representation under the 'judicare' model.

The organization provides help with domestic violence, family law, child custody, refugee and immigration hearings, and poverty law issues. LAO also provides assistance in criminal cases where the accused is likely to go to jail if convicted. As many offences are considered hybrid, that being the courts may decide to prosecute as either a summary or indictable offence, legal aid applicants are assessed on a case-by-case basis.

LAO determines eligibility for legal aid based on the applicant's financial situation and if LAO can provide help with the legal issue. To qualify financially, an individual must make less than the amount in the table below for their family size.

| Number of family members | Income must be lower than (Note: "Am I eligible for a legal aid certificate?") |
|---|---|
| 1 | $22,720 |
| 2 | $32,131 |
| 3 | $39,137 |
| 4 | $45,440 |
| 5+ | $50,803 |

LAO maintains a second eligibility criterion for when an applicant requires a lawyer to represent them. This criterion is typically reserved for only the most serious of cases where providing legal help solely by other means such as duty counsel, summary legal advice or self-help would be insufficient. Those that qualify for representation are given a "certificate" which can be used as a voucher to hire a lawyer of their choosing who accepts legal aid clients. Lawyers who accept these legal aid certificates are paid directly through Legal Aid Ontario in accordance with a rate that is designed to reflect the fees that would be typically paid by a client of modest means. In some cases, clients may have to repay Legal Aid Ontario some or all of the cost of their representation, depending on their income.

| Number of family members | Income must be lower than |
|---|---|
| 1 | $15,781 |
| 2 | $28,406 |
| 3 | $33,102 |
| 4 | $38,026 |
| 5+ | $42,874 |
| Single boarders | $10,352 |

== Legal clinics ==
Legal Aid Ontario helps fund a network of 76 legal clinics throughout the province. These legal clinics provide advice, and in some cases representation, primarily for civil law matters on matters such as:

- workplace safety
- Canada Pension Plan appeals or issues
- Employment Insurance appeals
- insurance claims for long-term benefits, such as Ontario Disability Support Program
- Power of Attorney, wills or estates (at a limited number of legal clinics)
- Tenant protection (landlord and tenant issues, including referral to tenant duty counsel)

Legal clinics also play a large role in the provision of workshops and information sessions and the undertaking of law reform initiatives. Many legal clinics also publish brochures, booklets, pamphlets and fact sheets for the benefit of the public.

There are three types of legal clinics in Ontario, each providing different types of services:

- Community legal clinics provide legal help within a specific geographic area of the province. The services they offer can vary from one to another, depending on the needs of the local community.
- Specialty legal clinics focus on specific areas of law not normally covered by the community legal clinics. These legal clinics help with issues such as minority and specialty language group rights, youth and elderly assistance, individuals with disabilities and HIV & AIDS matters.
- Student Legal Aid Services Societies (SLASS) operate out of Ontario's seven law schools and provide legal advice and representation on matters such as criminal law, tenant issues, employee rights and small claims court. These legal clinics offer law students practical training and experience under the supervision of lawyers. SLASS clinics typically provide free legal assistance for students enrolled at the university and in some cases, students attending a local college.

== History of legal aid in Ontario ==
In 1951, the provincial government passed the Law Society Amendment Act, 1951, outlining the creation of a plan to assist low-income people and a small fund to cover its operation. However, lawyers who provided assistance did so entirely pro-bono and without being paid for their services. By 1967, the Legal Aid Act was passed, dividing responsibility of operating the legal aid plan between the province and the Law Society of Upper Canada (LSUC). Legal help was to be provided through two methods: in-court duty counsel lawyers and the certificate program where recipients would be given a "voucher" that could be used to hire a lawyer to represent them for a certain number of hours. Legal services were limited to criminal matters where the accused faced a serious risk of going to jail and family matters heard in the Ontario Superior Court of Justice.

Concerns were raised that this model of legal assistance did not provide individuals with sufficient representation, arguing that the legal issues of low-income clients were considerably different than of a paying customer. Part of this problem was due to a lack of lawyers interested in supporting low-income clients with so-called ‘poverty law’ matters, that being legal matters dealing with public assistance, tenant issues and welfare rights. The creation of the community legal clinic system sought to alleviate this problem by providing low-income Ontarians with dedicated resources to help them resolve these matters. A few years later, these developments would be incorporated into the 1978 study, Report of the Commission on Clinical Funding which ultimately played a significant role in the formation of the Ontario Legal Aid Plan (OLAP), the precursor to Legal Aid Ontario.

Over the next decade as OLAP grew and the organization expanded the number of legal clinics, operation costs began to increase substantially. By the early 1990s and at the peak of the recession, OLAP was issuing more than 200,000 certificates a year and covering a broad range of criminal, family, refugee, and other civil claims. At the same time, the number of community legal clinics had almost doubled from 35 a decade earlier to 66, with costs jumping from $3.3 million to $22.1 million annually. Faced with a recession, the province responded by freezing funding and reducing the legal aid certificate program by $27.5 million. This cap resulted in a steep decline of certificates granted; more than 150,000 fewer were issued from 1994 to 1999. Emphasis began to shift towards more cost-effective services such as staff lawyers, duty counsel and Student Legal Aid Services Societies.

In 1998 and in response to the growing need for legal aid, the Mike Harris Progressive Conservative government, on recommendation by the 1997 report A Blueprint for Publicly Funded Legal Services: the Report of the Ontario Legal Aid Review, introduced the Legal Aid Services Act which outlined the creation of an independent agency called Legal Aid Ontario (LAO). The Act defined LAO as independent from, but accountable to, the Ontario government through the Ministry of the Attorney General. LAO would become the sole agency for establishing, administering, and monitoring the legal aid system within the province, and was granted the ability to "provide legal aid services by any method that it considers appropriate, having regard to the needs of low-income individuals… and the costs of providing such services and the Corporation’s financial resources."

In response to economic, client, and government pressures to improve service and reduce costs, LAO has begun adopting modern approaches to service delivery. Some of these changes have included the consolidation of offices across the province into nine district offices, the development of a toll-free service, information sharing with the Ministry of Community & Social Services for social assistance eligibility information, and the expansion of courthouse services. While the province has assisted with increased investment over the last few years, a major decline in funding from the Law Foundation of Ontario trust accounts due to the Great Recession placed additional financial pressures on the organization. To address some of these issues, the Government of Ontario committed in 2014 to raising the eligibility thresholds to "allow over one million more people to qualify for legal aid services". This increase however also had the consequence of an unexpected and unprecedented increased in demand for legal help, far beyond what Legal Aid Ontario anticipated. As a measure to control spiraling costs, LAO halted the implementation of some of the newly expanded services until it matches available funding, froze staff salaries and maintained the current level of legal clinics funding for 2017/18.

== Funding ==
Funding for Legal Aid Ontario comes primarily from the Province of Ontario, the Government of Canada and the Law Foundation of Ontario (LFO). The LFO administers the interest earned on lawyers' trust fund balances and Legal Aid Ontario receives 75 per cent of this income, resulting in revenue levels highly dependent on the Bank of Canada overnight rate and real estate activity levels.

| Revenue ($ millions) (Note: Legal Aid Ontario annual reports) | 2004 | 2005 | 2006 | 2007 | 2008 | 2009 | 2010 | 2011 | 2012 | 2013 | 2014 | 2015 | 2016 |
|---|---|---|---|---|---|---|---|---|---|---|---|---|---|
| Province of Ontario (Note: Province of Ontario funding includes the Federal Government contributions listed below.) | $256.1 | $254.8 | $260.5 | $269.1 | $283.9 | $285.8 | $315.4 | $320.8 | $335.7 | $347.5 | $350.2 | $363.1 | $395.3 |
| Law Foundation of Ontario | $24.2 | $18.6 | $30.7 | $51.5 | $56.4 | $26.2 | $4.8 | $13.4 | $19.1 | $22.3 | $25.6 | $29.2 | $25.2 |
| Client contributions | $13.1 | $15.2 | $15.7 | $17.3 | $18.9 | $21.5 | $21.9 | $18.1 | $15.4 | $12.1 | $10.0 | $9.9 | $10.0 |
| Judgements, costs & settlements and other recoveries (Note: A change in reporting was made in 2011 that saw the creation of a "miscellaneous income category" and the renameing of "judgements, costs and settlements" to "client and other recoveries" and "investment and other income" to "investment income".) | $1.7 | $1.5 | $0.28 | $0.41 | $0.28 | $0.30 | $0.26 | $0.52 | $0.36 | $0.68 | $1.1 | $0.76 | $0.81 |
| Investment income | $4.6 | $3.0 | $2.1 | $1.4 | $3.1 | $3.1 | $1.7 | $0.27 | $0.33 | $0.25 | $0.41 | $0.60 | $0.39 |
| Miscellaneous income | | | | | | | | $0.46 | $0.73 | $0.59 | $0.66 | $0.63 | $0.97 |
| Total | $299.6 | $289.3 | $293.1 | $339.7 | $362.6 | $336.9 | $344.1 | $353.6 | $371.7 | $383.4 | $388.0 | $404.2 | $432.6 |

The Federal government of Canada provides a portion of funding to contribute to criminal, immigration and refugee law and Youth Criminal Justice Act matters as well as other expenditures that fall under the Federal government's jurisdiction.

| Contributions ($ millions) | 2004 | 2005 | 2006 | 2007 | 2008 | 2009 | 2010 | 2011 | 2012 | 2013 | 2014 | 2015 | 2016 |
|---|---|---|---|---|---|---|---|---|---|---|---|---|---|
| Federal government contributions | $50.6 | $50.6 | $50.7 | $50.7 | $50.4 | $50.1 | $53.3 | $53.1 | $53.8 | $51.1 | $51.1 | $50.7 | $50.9 |

== Criticism ==
In February 2008, the organization was criticized in an 87-page report by the Ontario Ombudsman for mishandling of funds in the legal defence of Richard Wills. The report, A Test of Wills, explains: "Legal Aid Ontario had estimated that Mr. Wills' defence would cost $50,000. When it was done, it, in fact, cost more than a million dollars". Wills, considered a person of means to fund his own defence, was charged with the murder of his longtime lover. In the months preceding his trial, he had transferred his assets into his wife's name. Subsequently, he applied to Legal Aid Ontario where he was effectively provided with a "no check/blank cheque" defence.

There has been growing concern that Legal Aid Ontario's financial eligibility criteria lags behind not only other provinces but also the low-income cut-off. While recent efforts by the province are being made to narrow the gap, the first time since 1996, it has been calculated that "legal aid financial eligibility guidelines are approximately half the unofficial poverty line in Ontario as calculated by Statistics Canada's Low Income Measure". To rectify this, Legal Aid Ontario has committed to increasing the financial eligibility threshold by six per cent each year, starting in April 2017 until it falls in line with the low-income cut-off.

There has also been a growing concern from the Superior Court on how Legal Aid Ontario is funding Family Law cases. On December 16, 2011, the Honourable Mr. Justice Pazaratz in the matter of Izyuk v. Bilousov, 2011 ONSC 7476 (CanLII) in a 74 paragraph order pondered if Legal Aid Ontario provided the Applicant in the matter with "wings" so "she do whatever she wants in court, without ever worrying about fees – hers or anyone else's?" (para 4). In addition, his Honour observed paragraph 60 that the litigant "conducted herself as if her Legal Aid certificate amounted to a blank cheque – unlimited resources which most unrepresented Respondents would be hard-pressed to match." Finally, in paragraph 60 of the order his Honour explicitly stated "Encouraging settlement and discouraging inappropriate behaviour by litigants is important in all litigation – but particularly in family law, and most particularly in custody cases. No litigant should perceive they have "wings" – the ability to say or do anything they want in court, without consequences."

The Honourable Mr. Justice Pazaratz further raised concerns on March 13, 2017, in the matter of Abdulaali v Salih, 2017 ONSC 1609 (CanLII) again criticized the misuse of Legal Aid Funds by Family Law litigants. In the first paragraph of the order, the Honourable Mr. Justice Pazaratz states that "The next time anyone at Legal Aid Ontario tells you they're short of money, don’t believe it. It can't possibly be true. Not if they're funding cases like this." The Honourable Mr. Justice Pazaratz again in paragraph 31, frustrated by the wasteful use of taxpayer money and frustration with counsel stated: "To add motivation, I explained that if they didn't come to their senses I would formally request that the Area Director of Legal Aid Ontario attend before me to justify the obscene expenditure of tax money on a simple case with such an obvious solution." Both the matters of Izyuk v. Bilousov, 2011 ONSC 7476 (CanLII) and Abdulaali v Salih, 2017 ONSC 1609 (CanLII) have received extensive and critical coverage in the media.

== See also ==
- Canadian law
- Duty counsel
- Government of Ontario
- Law Society of Upper Canada
- Lawyer referral service
- Legal aid
- Ministry of the Attorney General
- R. v. Brydges
