= Peter Wright (soldier) =

Canadian Army Officer

Peter Edward Robinson Wright OBE QC
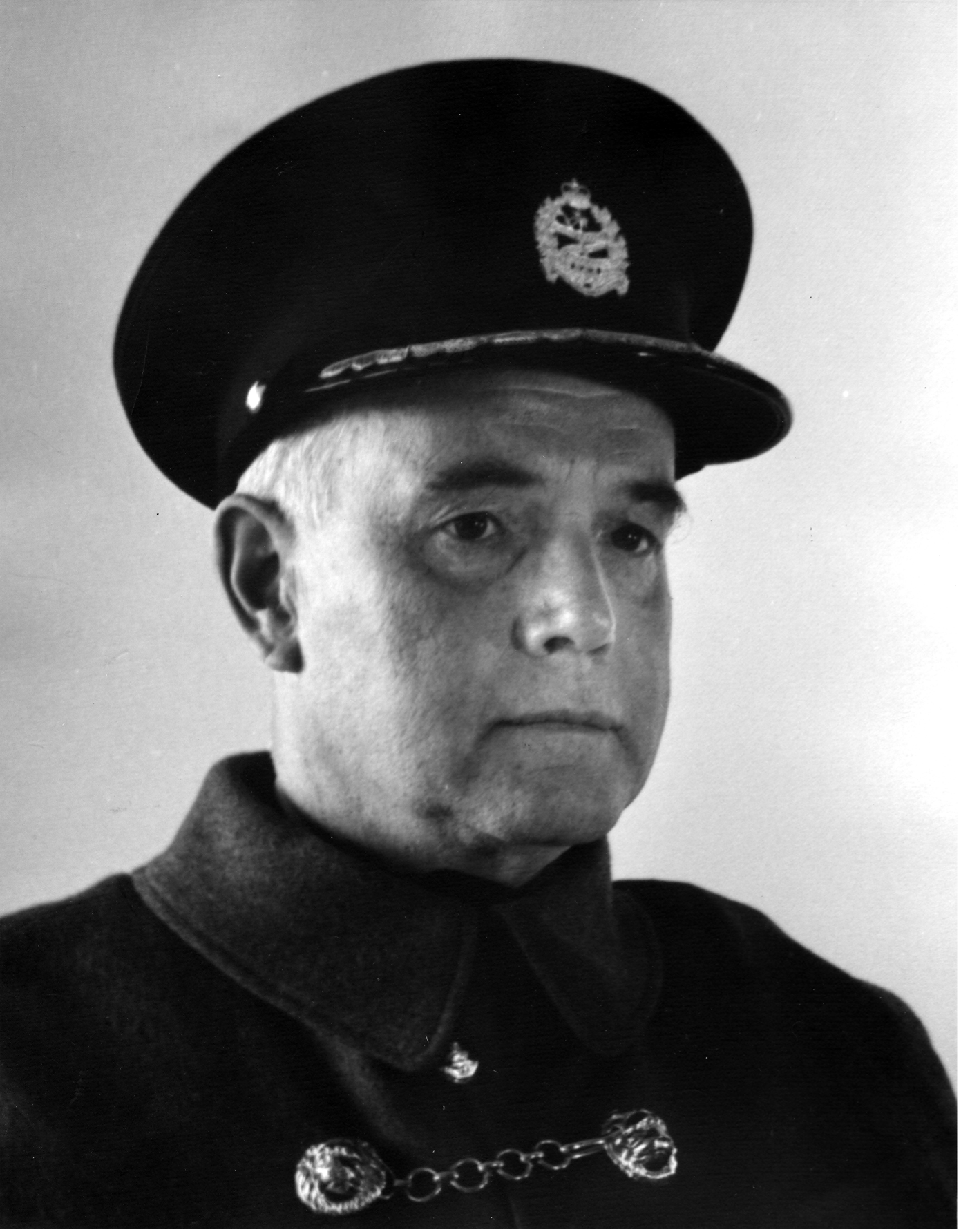
- Born: July 16, 1910; Toronto, Ontario
- Died: November 26, 1986 (aged 76)
- Allegiance: Canada
- Branch: Canadian Infantry Corps, Canadian Intelligence Corps
- Rank: Colonel
- Conflicts: Dieppe Raid; Operation Overlord; Battle of the Bulge
- Awards: Order of the British Empire, Commandeur in de Orde van Oranje Nassau
- Alma mater: St. Andrews University; Osgoode Hall
- Other work: Ontario High Court of Justice

Colonel Peter Wright OBE QC was a Canadian army officer, politician, lawyer and judge. He served during World War II as the senior intelligence officer with the First Canadian Army in Europe.

== Early life ==
Peter Edward Robinson was born July 16, 1910, in Toronto to Edward and Geraldine Wright. Both Edward and Geraldine were lawyers. Reports in the press regarding Peter's appointment to bench noted that Geraldine was the third woman lawyer to practise in the British Empire. He was educated at Rosedale Public School and University of Toronto Schools in Toronto, St. Andrew's University in St Andrew's, Scotland and returned to study law at Osgoode Hall Law School before joining the military at the outbreak of the Second World War. He was called to the Ontario bar in 1934.

== Early Military Career ==
September 13, 1939, he entered service in the Royal Regiment of Canada as a Lieutenant and subsequently held various postings with the 4th Canadian Division, the 2nd Canadian Division, 1st Corps and the Canadian Planning Staff.

=== Raid on Dieppe ===
Col Wright was involved directly in the Raid on Dieppe. In a post war interview he provided the following comments.

I had the privilege of serving on the HQ ship at Dieppe—the same ship on which were the Force Commander, Hughes Hallett, the Army Commander, MGen J.H. Roberts and the Air Force Commander, Air Commodore Cole. I had the privilege of taking part in all the details of planning for Dieppe. I had also had the privilege of belonging to one of the Regiments that landed 510 men and got ten men back. I had knowledge of the battle and also of the sad results. The 500 who did not come back were among the finest people I have ever known, and the loss of so many of them was something I had more than ordinary cause to be sad about. But I have always felt that Dieppe was a very necessary part of the education of the whole allied effort. I know why in some instances we made the mistakes we did at Dieppe. They were mistakes that were shared at all levels. It was only a lesson such as Dieppe that could teach all the arms that were involved and all the people that were involved that we had to do things somewhat differently. It was an immense sacrifice in Canadian terms. It was made by the Canadians and in my opinion, it was a sacrifice that led directly to our ultimate success in the war.

== Intelligence career ==
In June 1943 Col Wright was posted to 1 Canadian Army HQ as an intelligence officer. All of his previous work had been either as an infantry officer or staff officer and the move came as quite a shock. In a post war interview he provided the following comments on his change.

I was an Infantry Staff Officer. Throughout the war, I did what I was ordered to do. In June 1943, while I was on leave, I received a message that I had been appointed General Staff Officer Grade 1 AIR at 1 Canadian Army HQ. I knew nothing about AIR and so on my way to Edinburgh, I bought a little booklet on “How to Fly” for 9 pence. I read this on my way to Edinburgh and reported in. I was told that I was not G1 AIR, but G1 Intelligence. That is how I started. I succeeded Lord Tweedsmuir who had been G1 Intelligence. He wasn't there when I arrived, but Major George B. MacGillivray was. He was the person who introduced me to Intelligence. It was then that I started working in Intelligence and I did that throughout the rest of the war.

=== The Ardennes Offensive ===
When the German Army launched its Ardennes offensive in December 1944, most of the allied forces were caught off-guard by the surprise attack. Lt-Col Peter E.R. Wright as the G2 First Canadian Army, set his staff to work exploiting every possible source of information in order to determine the value of the reports he received. Of the two main sources, nothing was being received from Wireless Intelligence and, the Air Photo Interpretation Section (APIS) was initially prevented by bad flying weather from getting photo coverage.

Information provided by tactical reconnaissance elements in conjunction with air photos that had been rapidly processed in the field as well as Prisoner of War (PW) Interrogation reports, convinced the Canadian Intelligence staffs that the German build-up of offensive forces in the Ardennes was real. The First Canadian Army Intelligence Summary (INTSUM) sent on 26 December 1944 stated, “The enemy appears clearly to have intended to cross the Maas (river) between Geertruidenberg and Heusden. Whether in fact he will do so depends...on the issue of the Ardennes battle [which] must be taken to be pending.” This INTSUM was signed personally by Lt-Col Wright rather than by his duty staff officer. At 1800 hours, he told General Crerar that, in his opinion, the threat was real, not fake. General Crerar replied “I’ve been talking to Monty and he doesn’t think there’s anything in it.” Lt-Col Wright immediately called Brigadier E.T. Williams, BGS (Int), 21 Army Group HQ, and told him of the (evidence in the) pictures and his conclusions. He agreed and said he would speak to General Montgomery. Around 2000 hours, LCol Wright was called to General Crerar’s caravan at Tilburg. He said, “I’ve just been talking to Monty. He thinks there might be something to this threat across the Maas River. We’re deferring the move of Fourth Canadian Armoured Division to XXX Corps and the Guards Armoured Division have been added to our reserve if need be and we’re going to move Army HQ back from Tilburg to Turnhout.” LCol Wright stated “that was the only time I can remember where any appreciation or fact from G (Int) at Army altered the disposition of the Army or its plans.”

== Decorations ==
=== Order of the British Empire ===
OBE nomination for Colonel Wright written by General Henry Crerar

Col Wright was nominated for the Order of the British Empire by General Crerar shortly after they landed in Europe. The nomination reads as follows:

This officer has been employed as GSO 1 Int, First Cdn Army since 21 June 43. As such, he has been primarily responsible for –

(a) The organization and training for active operations of Int staffs and units of First Cdn Army

(b) The preparation of the comprehensive Int material required for planning of operation OVERLORD within First Cdn Army.

These responsibilities he has met with outstanding distinction. In addition, since landing on the Continent on 16 June 44, he has by his ability, initiative and a devotion, far exceeding the demands of duty, provided for Senior Commanders and Staffs within First Cdn Army an Int and Counter Int service which has contributed notably to the success of operations.

Signed: “HDG Crerar” GOC-in-C First Cdn Army Dated 24 Aug 1944.

Wright was appointed an Officer of the Order of the British Empire on 1 February 1945 and promoted to Colonel GS (Int.) on May 3, 1945, entitling him to the post-nominal OBE.

=== Order of Orange-Nassau ===
Wright was further appointed a Commander of the Order of Orange-Nassau (with Swords) by the Queen of Netherlands on December 8th, 1945.

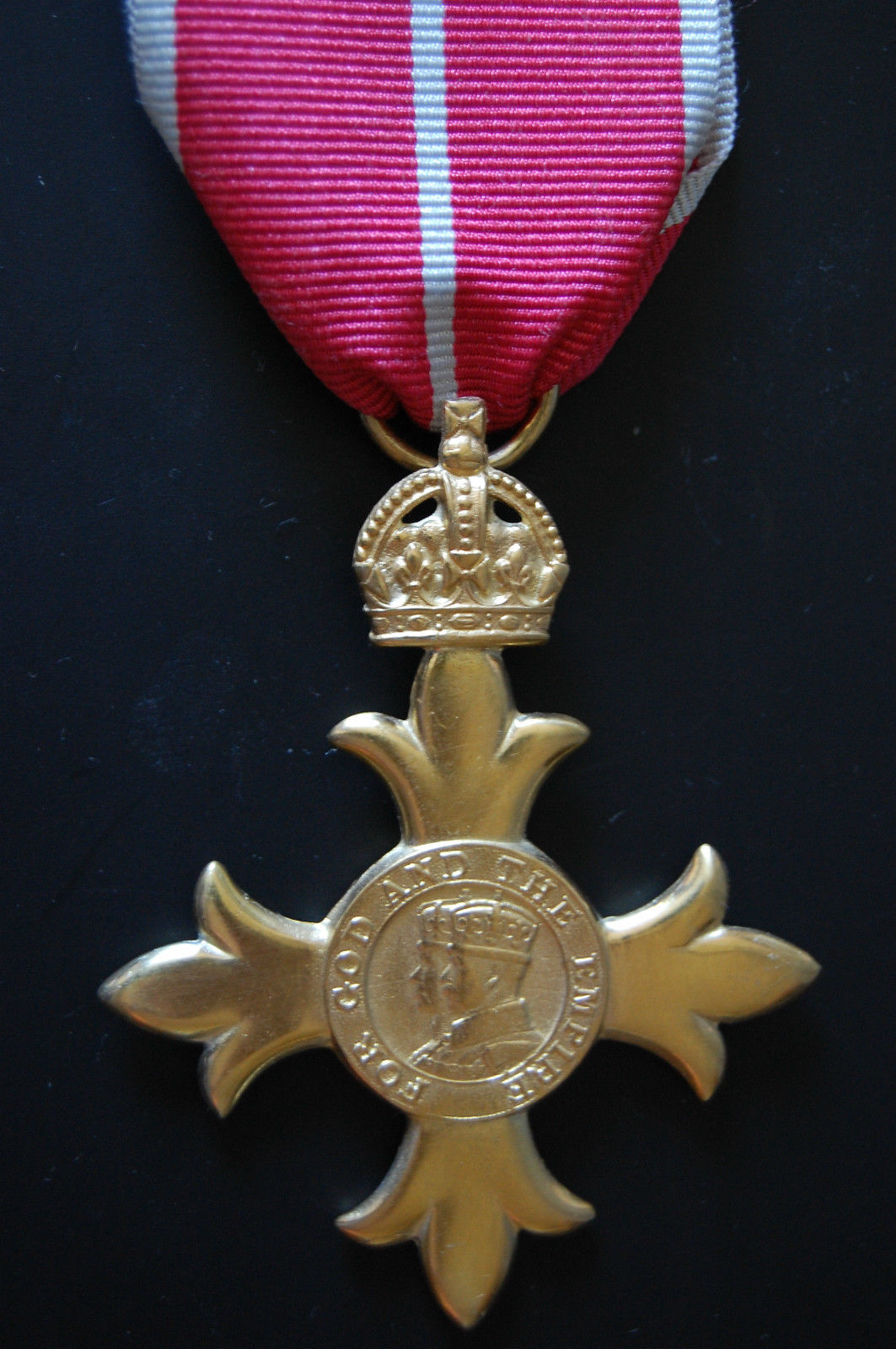
Officer badge (military division) of the Order of British Empire

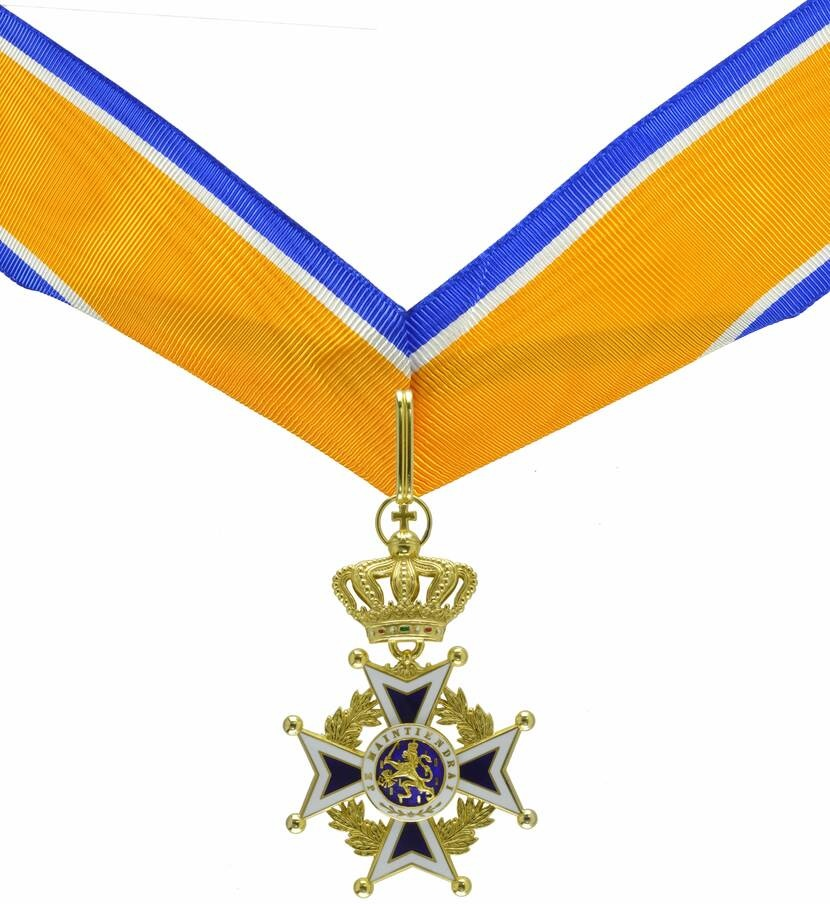
Commander's Cross of the Order of Orange-Nassau

== Post war intelligence work ==
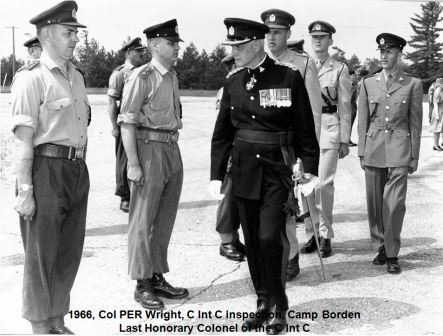
Colonel Peter. E. R. Wright shown here inspecting Militia Intelligence Sections taking part in the summer concentration training period in 1966.

At the end of the war, Col Wright is credited with writing First Canadian Army Final Intelligence Report summarizing all Canadian Army intelligence efforts throughout the war. The following quotation is taken from the report.

The primary duty of Intelligence is to give the Commander whatever information he requires about the enemy and to bring any significant changes to his notice immediately.” He further noted that “Intelligence in any formation is based on confidence,” and that there must be “direct access to the Commander and his principal staff officer.” This in turn means “the Intelligence Officer, who is as subject to error as anyone else, must always be prompt and clear in admitting his mistakes.

Col Wright was also involved in the foundation of the Canadian Military Intelligence Association (CMIA), becoming its First President. In February 1964, Col Wright replaced General Harry D.G. Crerar as the Honorary Colonel Commandant (appointed 3 February 1949), of the CMIA. Col Wright contributed much to the development of Army Intelligence in Canada in both peace and war.

== Political Candidate ==
On May 12, 1948, Wright was nominated as the Ontario Liberal candidate for the electoral district of St. David, a downtown Toronto district covering Rosedale and the area between Sherbourne Street and the Don Valley south of Bloor Street. Toronto was a conservative electoral bastion for much of the first half of the 20th century especially provincially. (The city had only one Liberal MP at the time. It last elected a Liberal MPP in 1937 and did not elect the next one until 1959.) Wright was the third wheel in a high profile re-match between two prominent foes: Progressive Conservative cabinet minister Roland Michener, a future Governor General, and the predecessor CCF MPP William Dennison, a future Toronto mayor. Like all but one of his fellow Liberal candidates in Toronto in the 1948 provincial election, Wright came in a distant third with 18.9% of the votes.

1948 Ontario general election: St David
Party	Candidate	Votes	%	±%
Co-operative Commonwealth	William Dennison	8,539	41.3	+14.6
Progressive Conservative	Roland Michener	7,863	38.0	-5.3
Liberal	Peter Wright	3,900	18.9	-5.1
Independent Labour	Roy Boskett	253	1.2	-
Socialist Labor	H. Debragh	69	0.3	-
Independent	P.W. Graham	42	0.2	-
Total valid votes		20,666	100.00	-

Soon after his defeat, he was elected to serve as president of the Canadian Club of Toronto for the 1949-50 term.

== Legal Career ==
Following the war, he resumed legal practice in Toronto, becoming a named partner of the predecessor firm of McMillan LLP in 1946, causing its named to be changed to McMillan, Binch, Wilkinson, Stuart, Berry & Wright. His name remained on the firm's stationary until around 1952. (Long after their respective departures from the respective firms and passings, McMillan would in 2011 swallow up Lang Michener LLP, the namesake firm found by his Conservative electoral rival in 1926.) He then found the firm Wright and McTaggart with Donald Harrison McTaggart. The firm was a prominent litigation shop regularly retained by large corporations and government departments through the 1950s and 1960s. It was the work place and early training ground for many renowned lawyers, jurists and politicians for many years.

He served for a period as a provincial editor for Ontario of the Canadian Bar Review, with case comments and book reviews attributed to his name from 1947 to 1959. His 1951 article What is a "Profession"? was often cited the legal development of professional regulation and discipline.

He also took on a number of corporate directorships during his two decades of active legal practice, including Barclays Bank (Canada), Scottish Union & National Insurance, and Norwich Union Insurance Societies.

He was one of the founders of WoodGreen Community Centre. .

In April 1969, Wright was appointed by Justice Minister John Turner to a fill a Toronto seat on the Supreme Court of Ontario (later known as High Court and now known as the Superior Court of Justice of Ontario). He served on the bench until his retirement in 1977.

Justice Peter Wright died on November 26, 1986.

== Honours and awards ==
- Order of the British Empire (1 February 1945)
- Commander of the Order of Orange-Nassau
