= Chris Lea =

Green Party of Canada leader, 1990–1996

- Lea in 2008

Leader of the Green Party of Canada
- In office 1990–1996
- Preceded by: Kathryn Cholette
- Succeeded by: Wendy Priesnitz

Personal details
- Party: Green Party of Canada

Chris Lea is a designer, politician and political activist in Canada. He was the leader of the Green Party of Canada from 1990 to 1996. Lea is notable for being the first openly gay political party leader in Canadian history.

== Biography ==
Lea is a graduate student in theory and policy studies at the Ontario Institute for Studies in Education. He was formerly a professional architect.

During the 1980s, he volunteered for The Body Politic, a periodical focusing on gay issues, sitting briefly on its editorial collective, and serving on the committee that set up Xtra!, Canada's most successful gay newspaper. Lea worked on the committee that organized the Summit Citizen's Conference, the counter-summit to the G-7 meetings taking place in Toronto in 1988. With Frank de Jong, Lea organized a successful viral campaign against McDonald's use of disposable styrofoam clamshell packing containers and as well a series of protests which stalled the expansion of nuclear power in Ontario in the early 1990s by bringing light on the massive debt that the province's nuclear programme had created.

Lea, who hails from a family of entertainers that includes the 1950s Canadian TV icon Shirley Harmer, began a side career as an opera performer in 2002, and in February 2005 undertook his first on-stage solo in a performance of Gioacchino Rossini's The Barber of Seville.

He was the director of facilities at Hart House at the University of Toronto, where as part of a team he won a Green Innovation Award in 2010, for a project to utilise electrical power generated from exercise bikes. For many years he was vice-President of the Toronto Opera Repertoire, and is now President of Toronto City Opera.

Lea lives in Toronto.

=== Green Party leadership ===
Lea was the leader of the Green Party of Canada from 1990 to 1996. The Green Party of Canada's internal organization was very decentralized in the early 1990s, and its leadership position was seen as a nominal title. In his time as leader though, Lea worked to create a more usual party structure. Lea started Green Canada, the party's internal members' newspaper (which later became Green Canada Vert before it was absorbed into the Green Party of Canada web pages). Lea initiated the practice of having regular teleconference meetings of the party's council. Aided by de Jong and Steve Kisby, Lea was the first to compile a comprehensive Green Party policy document for electronic distribution. Lea was the first Green Party of Canada leader to do a national tour (from Halifax to Clayoquot Sound, by bike, rail and air, during the 1993 federal election) and was the first to represent the party in a nationally televised debate. Lea created TV commercials and print advertising for elections and the 1992 Meech Lake Accord referendum. He advocated for a unified corporate identity for the party, and designed the first Green Party logo to be used nationally.

As leader, Lea made presentations to royal commissions on electoral reform and on financing the CBC, sometimes in French. As well Lea helped to organize party conferences and took part in legal challenges against the broadcast consortium that regulates the televised debates during the election period.

In 1994, to settle an impasse between the U.S. Committees of Correspondence (the national green party) and the California Green Party over representation to the 1995 World Green Coordination meeting in Mexico City, Lea organized an international election covering Canada, the U.S and the Caribbean, electing Ontario's Ella Haley and New Jersey's Anila Walkin.

As party leader, Lea campaigned for the House of Commons of Canada in the 1993 federal election, and received 613 votes in the Toronto riding of Trinity—Spadina for a sixth-place finish. He also campaigned for the Ontario legislature in the 1995 provincial election as a candidate of the Green Party of Ontario, and received 241 votes in the Toronto riding of St. George—St. David. He has not sought federal or provincial office since this time, though he remains active within the Green Party. In 1998, he volunteered to be the party's chief agent to relieve Steve Kisby from these duties.

Lea has long been an ally of Jim Harris in the Toronto Green community, and supported Harris's bid for re-election as party leader in 2004.

== Electoral record ==
1995 Ontario general election: St. George—St. David
Party	Candidate	Votes	%
Progressive Conservative	Al Leach	10,662	33.9
Liberal	Tim Murphy	10,325	32.8
New Democratic	Brent Hawkes	9,672	30.7
Independent	Linda Gibbons	326	1.0
Green	Chris Lea	241	0.8
Natural Law	Ron Robins	151	0.5
Independent	Alex Nosal	98	0.3
Total valid votes		31,475	

1993 Canadian federal election: Trinity—Spadina
Party	Candidate	Votes	%	±%
Liberal	Tony Ianno	19,769	51.14	+13.79
New Democratic	Winnie Ng	10,430	26.98	-11.57
Progressive Conservative	Lee Monaco	3,129	8.09	-13.25
Reform	Peter Loftus	3,027	7.83	
National	Patrick Kutney	881	2.28	
Green	Chris Lea	623	1.61	
Natural Law	Ashley James Deans	391	1.01	
Libertarian	Paul Barker	283	0.73	-0.49
Marxist–Leninist	Fernand Deschamps	74	0.19	
Abolitionist	Robert Martin	52	0.13	
Total valid votes		38,659		
