= Joanne Campbell =

Joanne Campbell may refer to:

- Joanne Campbell (actress), British actress and drama therapist
- Joanne Campbell (politician), Canadian politician
- Jo Ann Campbell, American singer
