= Margaret Scrivener =

Canadian politician, second women to serve in Ontario provincial cabinet

Ontario MPP
- In office 1971–1985
- Preceded by: Henry Price
- Succeeded by: Ian Scott
- Constituency: St. David

Personal details
- Born: Margaret Mary Howse; 1922 Toronto, Ontario
- Died: September 11, 1997 (aged 75)
- Party: Progressive Conservative
- Spouse: Richard Scrivener
- Children: 4
- Occupation: Journalist

Margaret Mary Burgoyne-Howse Scrivener (c. 1922 – September 11, 1997) was a Canadian politician who served in the Ontario provincial legislature in the 1970s and 1980s, and was the second woman to join the Ontario provincial cabinet.

Scrivener represented the Toronto electoral district of St. David in the Legislative Assembly of Ontario for four terms as a Progressive Conservative Party member between 1971 and 1981, representing the district when it straddled the Don Valley and covered a sizable chunk in Riverdale. She entered the cabinet of Premier Bill Davis in 1975 at the same time as Bette Stephenson, together as the second and third women to serve in the cabinet of Ontario. Scrivener served in cabinet for three years before returning to the backbench.

== Background ==
Scrivener was born in Toronto and was educated at St. Mildred's-Lightbourn School. She worked for the Toronto Telegram newspaper during and after World War II, and covered Marilyn Bell's historic swims across Lake Ontario.

From 1962 to 1970, she and her husband R Harding Scrivener, president of a consulting engineering firm, owned a 120-hectare dairy farm near Keswick, Ontario.

=== Community activism prior to election ===
As a resident of the affluent Rosedale neighbourhood, she was active in several Rosedale community groups, and was a prominent figure in the struggle to preserve the ravines from development.

She served as chair of the Ontario Planning Association, and was appointed to be a member of the Metropolitan Toronto Planning Board, a regional planning body established by the provincial government in 1953 to draw up an official plan for Metropolitan Toronto and over time became responsible for all aspects of regional planning. In that role she was a vocal advocate for expansion of the metro area and accelerated growth, and her commentary appeared in the Toronto dailies on many occasions through much of the 1960s, often critical of Provincial Treasurer Darcy McKeough, whose Treasury portfolio includes municipal affairs. Scrivener was serving as the board's vice chair immediately prior to her election in 1971.

== Politics ==
=== Winning over St. David ===
Scrivener entered electoral political in the 1971 Ontario provincial election as the Progressive Conservative candidate defending the Toronto riding of St. David seat left open by four-term incumbent Bud Price. She was diagnosed with breast cancer before entering the legislature, but did not share this information with her colleagues. The district served up some extreme socio-ecoonomic contrast between the ultra-affluent Rosedale where Scrivener resided and the improvised Regent Park. It also gain some hostile territory for the conservative as the riding expanded over the Don Valley to cover a sizable chuck of reliably-NDP Riverdale. Price retained the seat in the 1967 election with only 36% share of the vote, winning on almost perfect even-split between Liberal and NDP candidates.

Scrivener also had to contend with the ghosts of candidates past being ever-present as current larger-than-life figures. About a quarter century earlier in 1948, St. David was the battleground where a previously ousted CCF MPP named William Dennison returned to exact his revenge on the rising star Conservative minister named Roland Michener, ending his promising cabinet career after just two years. In 1971, Dennison and Michener were respectively the incumbent Mayor of Toronto and Governor General of Canada.

Scrivener proved to be an engaging campaigner with robust organization and deep pockets. She was also greatly helped by Bill Davis's decision to stop the Spadina Expressway, an key issue for her base in Rosedale and Moore Park. When all ballots were counted, Scrivener not only retained the seat for the Progressive Conservative but secured a seven-point swing in the PC's favour. She defeated NDP candidate Giles Endicott by a margin of over 5,000 votes, making significant gains mostly at the expense of the Liberals. She went to win three more election, holding on to St. David with diminishing margin while the PCs gradually lost most other downtown districts. In each of the three subsequent contests, she dealt defeat to a rival who later went on to be major figures: June Rowlands in 1975 (later the first woman to serve as Mayor of Toronto), Gordon Cressy in 1977 (councillor and defacto progressive faction leader on council in the early 80s) and Ian Scott in 1951 (Attorney General and among the most powerful ministers in the Peterson ministry).

By the 1981 campaign, which occurred after Scrivener was dropped from cabinet, Scrivener largely avoided campaigning outside of her home turfs. Refusing an appearance on CBC's Metro Morning, and declining participation in almost all all-candidate events, earning her the moniker the "Rosedale Ghost".

=== In and out of cabinet ===
In securing election in the 1971 election, Scrivener was only one of two women in the government caucus, along with Margaret Birch from Scarborough. Despite pledging during the election campaign to include a woman in his cabinet if a Progressive Conservative woman were to be elected, Premier Davis included neither in the shuffle immediately after the election, explained that he opted to include no new members until they gain more experience in the legislature. While Birch was elevated to cabinet less than a year after as a minister without portfolio, Scrivener served on the backbench for her entire first term, only named a parliamentary assistant in 1974. It was reported that she aggressively lobbied for a cabinet position with responsibility for affairs affecting Metro Toronto, and that Premier Davis appreciated neither the pressure nor the narrowcasting of role.

After winning re-election in 1975, Scrivener was elevated to cabinet on the same day as rookie member Bette Stephenson, thus shared with her the distinction as the second and third women to serve in the Ontario cabinet. Scrivener was appointed Minister of Government Services. After a cabinet shuffle on February 3, 1977, she was named Minister of Revenue.

Following the 1977 provincial election in which Scrivener defeated NDP challenger Gordon Cressy by a close margin of 836 votes, she was dropped from cabinet on January 21, 1978. Even as she was being exited, Premier Office staff briefed against her, highlighted to reporters her "hardline approach and provocative style" as the reason for her removal.

Scrivener spent the remainder of her legislative career as a backbencher. In the 1981 provincial election, she defeated future Liberal Attorney-General Ian Scott by 1,022 votes.

She did not campaign in the 1985 election. Shortly before his official retirement as premier, Davis appointed Scrivener as chair of the Criminal Injuries Compensation Board. Although many considered her to be a moderate Tory, in January 1985 Scrivener endorsed Frank Miller as a candidate to succeed Davis as the leader of the Progressive Conservative party.

== Personal life ==
Scrivener was a skilled pianist and listed Mozart and Chopin as being among her favourite composers.

She died in 1997, at age 75. Her memorial service was held at the Cathedral Church of St. James.

== Records ==
=== Electoral records ===
1971 Ontario general election: St. David
Party	Candidate	Votes	%
Progressive Conservative	Margaret Scrivener	13,169	49.5
New Democratic	Giles Endicott	8,032	30.2
Liberal	Gerry Tooke	5,104	19.2
Social Credit	R.H. James	316	1.2
Total		26,621	
Canadian Press (1971-10-22). "Here's who won on the Metro ridings". The Toronto Daily Star. Toronto. p. 12.

1975 Ontario general election: St. David
Party	Candidate	Votes	%
Progressive Conservative	Margaret Scrivener	10,593	40.5
New Democratic	Jim Lemon	7,990	30.5
Liberal	June Rowlands	7,153	27.3
Independent	Vincent Miller	232	0.9
Communist	Anna Larsen	205	0.8
Total		26,173	
Canadian Press (1975-09-19). "Results from the 29 ridings in Metro". The Toronto Daily Star. Toronto. p. A18.

1977 Ontario general election: St. David
Party	Candidate	Votes	%
Progressive Conservative	Margaret Scrivener	11,892	44.2
New Democratic	Gordon Cressy	11,047	41.0
Liberal	R.M. McClelland	3,807	14.1
Communist	R.S. Parkhill	187	0.7
Total		26,933	
Canadian Press (1977-06-10). "How they voted in Metro area". The Toronto Daily Star. Toronto. p. A10.

1981 Ontario general election: St. David
Party	Candidate	Votes	%
Progressive Conservative	Margaret Scrivener	9,477	39.3
Liberal	Ian Scott	8,459	35.1
New Democratic	Tyrone Turner	5,952	24.7
Independent	Rhino Mappin	237	1.0
Total		24,125	
Canadian Press (1981-03-20). "Election results for Metro Toronto ridings". The Windsor Star. Windsor, Ontario. p. 22.

=== Cabinet roles ===
Davis ministry, Province of Ontario (1971–1985)
Cabinet posts (2)
Predecessor	Office	Successor
Arthur Meen	Minister of Revenue; 1977–1978	Lorne Maeck
James Snow	Minister of Government Services; 1975–1977	John Smith
