= Barbara Hall (politician) =

Canadian politician (born 1946)

Barbara Hall CM
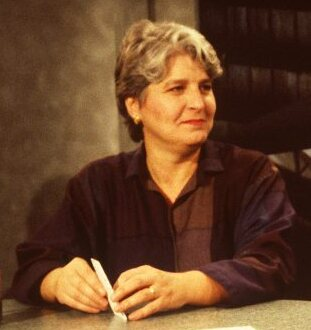

Chief Commissioner of the Ontario Human Rights Commission
- In office November 28, 2005 – February 27, 2015
- Preceded by: Keith Norton
- Succeeded by: Ruth Goba (interim)

61st Mayor of Toronto
- In office December 1, 1994 – December 31, 1997
- Preceded by: June Rowlands
- Succeeded by: Mel Lastman

City Councillor, Ward 7
- In office December 1, 1985 – November 30, 1994
- Preceded by: David Reville; Joanne Campbell
- Succeeded by: Pam McConnell

Personal details
- Born: 1946 (age 79–80) Ottawa, Ontario, Canada
- Party: Independent (1994-present)
- Other political affiliations: New Democrat (until 1994)
- Occupation: Politician; lawyer; public servant

Barbara Hall CM (born 1946) is a Canadian lawyer and former politician who served as the 61st mayor of Toronto from 1994 to 1997, the last mayor of Toronto prior to amalgamation. Hall served as the chief commissioner of the Ontario Human Rights Commission from 2005 to 2015.

In 2014, Cawthra Square Park in Toronto's Church and Wellesley neighbourhood was renamed Barbara Hall Park in her honour. She was inducted as a Member of the Order of Canada in 2015.

== Background ==
Hall attended the University of Victoria in British Columbia but left without a bachelor's degree. She then became a community activist, moving to Nova Scotia to work with black families in rural areas. Hall worked as one of the first members of the Company of Young Canadians in the small community of Three Mile Plains, Nova Scotia.

In 1967, at the age of 20, she worked for Toronto youth programs and co-founded an alternative school. She served for a time as a probation officer in Cleveland, Ohio. She returned to Canada and studied law at Osgoode Hall Law School of York University and in 1980 was admitted to the Law Society of Upper Canada.

To earn money during her studies, Hall waited table at the Second City.

== Political career ==
=== Municipal ===
She was elected to Toronto City Council in the 1985 municipal election. That election marked a change in the structure of city council; prior to 1985, each ward elected two representatives to city council, and the one who had garnered more votes would also serve on Metro Toronto Council, but in the 1985 election each ward now directly elected a single representative to each body. Hall succeeded David Reville, who had departed municipal politics after winning a seat in the provincial election, and Joanne Campbell, who had run for and won election to the Metro Council.

=== Mayor of Toronto ===
Hall was elected Mayor of Toronto in 1994, defeating incumbent June Rowlands. Although she ran as an independent and was backed by supporters from different parties, she was widely regarded as an unofficial candidate of the New Democratic Party (NDP). Hall's victory was considered an upset, given the low popularity of Bob Rae's provincial NDP government at the time. She was the first mayor of Toronto to be a member of the NDP since William Dennison. As mayor, she presided over a period of economic growth for the city, represented by large construction projects like the Air Canada Centre and improvements to downtown residential neighbourhoods such as Cabbagetown and Church and Wellesley. Hall gained the support of author Jane Jacobs by playing a role in the implementation of the Two Kings project, which resuscitated the street life of 400 acres centred on King Street West at Spadina Avenue and King Street East at Parliament Street. She was the first Toronto mayor to march in the city's Pride Parade, supported affordable housing initiatives, and helped introduce violence against women as a national political issue in Canada.

In 1997, a new provincial government under Mike Harris amalgamated the City of Toronto with Scarborough, York, East York, North York, and Etobicoke. The new megacity was also called Toronto. Hall opposed the amalgamation, but nonetheless ran for mayor of the new municipality. Although she won the majority of the vote in Old Toronto, York, and East York, she lost to outgoing North York mayor Mel Lastman, who had a strong base of support in North York as well as in Etobicoke and Scarborough. Hall started the campaign well behind Lastman in public opinion polls, but her support increased enough to place a close second.

=== 2003 mayoral candidacy and subsequent work ===
Hall ran for mayor again in 2003 and on this occasion was strongly backed by supporters of the Ontario Liberal Party. She was widely considered an unofficial Liberal candidate while David Miller, an NDP city councillor, was considered an unofficial NDP candidate and John Tory was an unofficial Progressive Conservative candidate. Despite being the front-runner at the campaign's start and garnering strong support from the city's ethnic press, Hall wound up a distant third behind the winner, Miller, and runner-up John Tory.

== Provincial career ==
=== Provincial campaign ===
Hall campaigned for the Legislative Assembly of Ontario in the 1985 provincial election as a candidate of the New Democratic Party in St. David. She finished third against Liberal Attorney-General Ian Scott.

=== Health Results Team ===
Hall subsequently served on the Ontario government's "Health Results Team" as lead of community relations. Hall was appointed to this position by Health Minister George Smitherman, who had worked in Hall's office while she was mayor.

=== Chief Commissioner of the Ontario Human Rights Commission ===
In November 2005, Hall was appointed the Chief Commissioner of the Ontario Human Rights Commission (OHRC).

In December 2007, the OHRC released a preliminary report looking into bullying of Canadian-Asians fishing illegally on Lake Simcoe. Hall wrote that violence and harassment of Canadian-Asian anglers "remind us that racism and racial discrimination exist in Ontario." Hall added that "We're looking for communities across Ontario to have an open dialogue and take action on racism. Although this is often hard to do, it is necessary to make communities welcoming and safe for all."

==== Complaint against Maclean's ====
In April 2008, the OHRC dismissed a complaint by the Canadian Islamic Congress against Maclean's, but issued a statement denouncing the magazine. In an interview, Hall stated that "When the media writes, it should exercise great caution that it's not promoting stereotypes that will adversely impact on identifiable groups. I think one needs to be very careful when one speaks in generalities, that in fact one is speaking factually about all the people in a particular group."

The editors of Maclean's denounced Hall and her staff for what they called the "zealous condemnation of their journalism" and stated that "[Hall] cited no evidence, considered no counter-arguments, and appointed herself prosecutor, judge and jury in one fell swoop." Maclean's also accused every human rights commission in the country of "morphing out of their conciliatory roles to become crusaders working to reshape journalistic discourse in Canada." Maclean's wrote that Ms. Hall's press release was "a drive-by smear," and "perhaps the greatest disappointment in this whole saga." Mark Steyn, who wrote the excerpt in Maclean's that the complaint was based on, also sharply criticized Hall and the OHRC, commenting that "Even though they (the OHRC) don't have the guts to hear the case, they might as well find us guilty."

At a meeting of the Canadian Arab Federation on the day after the British Columbia Human Rights Tribunal heard the complaint, Hall served on a panel along with Khurrum Awan, one of the student lawyers who helped file the complaint who testified at the BC Human Rights Tribunal against Maclean's, and Haroon Siddiqui, editor emeritus of the Toronto Star. Hall joked to the audience that she could finally speak freely with her co-panellist Awan about his complaint. Awan praised Hall's condemnation of Maclean's, stating that he had difficulty developing support until Hall called Maclean's Islamophobic, and then "everyone wanted to be our uncle."

==== Proposal for a National Press Council ====
In February 2009, in a report to the Canadian Human Rights Commission, Hall in her capacity as OHRC Commissioner, recommended the creation of a National Press Council that would serve as a national media watchdog. Unlike current press councils in Canada, membership to this new council would be required by all publishers, webmasters and radio and television producers. Hall stated that such a council was necessary to protect human rights but insisted that such a body would not result in censorship of the media. Hall explained that the national press council would have the power to accept complaints of discrimination, in particular from "vulnerable groups" and although the council would have no power to censor media outlets, it could force them to carry the council's decisions, including counterarguments made by complainants.

Mary Agnes Welch, president of the Canadian Association of Journalists, stated that the current provincial press councils are "the only real place that readers can go to complain about stories short of the courts" but that they "are largely toothless and ineffective." However, she argued against a mandatory national press council, stating that:

"The provincial ones don't even work, so how could we have a national one? And I know a lot of journalists who would take umbrage at essentially being in a federally regulated profession.... If on the crazy off-chance that there is some momentum behind this idea of a national press council, it won't be coming from journalists."

The National Post strongly opposed Hall's proposal, arguing that a mandatory national press council "is merely the first step toward letting the Barbara Halls of the world decide what you get to hear, see and read." The Post also stated that Hall is a "pompous purveyor of social concern" who believes she "has the ability to judge which speech should be free and which not." Barbara Kay also strongly opposed Hall's suggestion, stating that her experience with the Quebec Press Council (QPC) was evidence that press councils are abused by those wishing to suppress the discussion of sensitive or controversial issues.

==== Toronto District School Board review ====
On March 16, 2015, Hall was appointed by the provincial government to chair a seven-member panel that will conduct public consultations to review the governance of the Toronto District School Board in an effort to "restore public confidence" in the institution after a series of controversies.

==== #TorontoStrong Fund administrator ====
After the Toronto van attack in April 2018, Hall was appointed as administrator by the volunteer steering committee of the #TorontoStrong Fund on June 13, 2018. She is tasked with distributing the approximately $3.4 million to the 26 victims and survivors of the attack by September 28, 2018.
