= St. George—St. David =

Former provincial electoral district in Ontario, Canada

Coordinates: 43.67°N 79.38°W

Ontario electoral district

Defunct provincial electoral district
- Legislature: Legislative Assembly of Ontario
- District created: 1986
- District abolished: 1996
- First contested: 1987
- Last contested: 1995

St. George—St. David was a provincial electoral district in Ontario, Canada, that existed between 1987 and 1999 that returned Members of Provincial Parliament (MPPs) to the Legislative Assembly of Ontario at Queen's Park.

The riding was created before the 1987 election when the former electoral districts of St. George and St. David were merged.

It was named after St. George's and St. David's wards, which had been historical names for two wards in the city of Toronto.

The riding was abolished for the 1999 provincial election.

== Members of Provincial Parliament ==
St. George—St. David
| Assembly | Years | Member | Party |
|---|---|---|---|
Created from St. George and St. David
| 34th | 1987–1990 | Ian Scott (Note: Scott resigned his seat on 28 September 1992.) | Liberal |
| 35th | 1990–1992 | Ian Scott | Liberal |
| 35th | 1992–1995 | Tim Murphy | Liberal |
| 36th | 1995–1999 | Al Leach | Progressive Conservative |
Sourced from the Ontario Legislative Assembly
Merged into Toronto Centre—Rosedale and St. Paul's after 1999

== Election results ==
1995 Ontario general election
| Party | Candidate | Votes | % | ±% |
|---|---|---|---|---|
| Progressive Conservative | Al Leach | 10,662 | 33.87 | –3.10 |
| Liberal | Tim Murphy | 10,325 | 32.80 | –16.83 |
| New Democratic | Brent Hawkes | 9,672 | 30.73 | +22.50 |
| Independent | Linda Dale Gibbons | 326 | 1.04 | – |
| Green | Chris Lea | 241 | 0.77 | –0.42 |
| Natural Law | Ron Robins | 151 | 0.48 | – |
| Independent | Alex Nosal | 98 | 0.31 | – |
| Total valid votes | | 31,475 | 98.68 | |
| Total rejected, unmarked and declined ballots | | 422 | 1.32 | –0.24 |
| Turnout | | 31,897 | 70.61 | +26.18 |
| Eligible voters | | 45,174 | | |
| Progressive Conservative gain from Liberal | | Swing | | +6.87 |
Source: Elections Ontario

Ontario provincial by-election, April 1, 1993 Resignation of Ian Scott
| Party | Candidate | Votes | % | ±% |
|---|---|---|---|---|
| Liberal | Tim Murphy | 8,750 | 49.63 | +13.55 |
| Progressive Conservative | Nancy Ruth | 6,518 | 36.97 | +13.56 |
| New Democratic | George Lamony | 1,451 | 8.23 | –27.61 |
| Family Coalition | Louis L. Di Rocco | 347 | 1.97 | –1.17 |
| Green | Phil Sarazen | 209 | 1.19 | – |
| Independent | Judith Snow | 119 | 0.67 | – |
| Independent | Ed Fortune | 107 | 0.61 | – |
| Independent | Robert Smith | 72 | 0.41 | – |
| Independent | John Steele | 57 | 0.32 | – |
| Total valid votes | | 17,630 | 98.44 | |
| Total rejected, unmarked and declined ballots | | 280 | 1.56 | +0.09 |
| Turnout | | 17,910 | 44.43 | –20.19 |
| Eligible voters | | 40,307 | | |
| Liberal hold | | Swing | | –0.00 |
Source: Elections Ontario

1990 Ontario general election
| Party | Candidate | Votes | % | ±% |
|---|---|---|---|---|
| Liberal | Ian Scott | 10,718 | 36.08 | –15.07 |
| New Democratic | Carolann Wright | 10,646 | 35.84 | +16.61 |
| Progressive Conservative | Keith Norton | 6,955 | 23.41 | –3.76 |
| Family Coalition | Ken Campbell | 932 | 3.14 | – |
| Libertarian | Beverly D.G. Antrobus | 455 | 1.53 | –0.92 |
| Total valid votes | | 29,706 | 98.52 | |
| Total rejected, unmarked and declined ballots | | 445 | 1.48 | +0.61 |
| Turnout | | 30,151 | 64.63 | +2.88 |
| Eligible voters | | 46,653 | | |
| Liberal hold | | Swing | | –15.84 |
Source: Elections Ontario

1987 Ontario general election
| Party | Candidate | Votes | % |
|---|---|---|---|
| Liberal | Ian Scott | 15,051 | 51.15 |
| Progressive Conservative | Susan Fish | 7,996 | 27.17 |
| New Democratic | John Campey | 5,658 | 19.23 |
| Libertarian | Michael C. Beech | 721 | 2.45 |
| Total valid votes | | 29,426 | 99.13 |
| Total rejected ballots | | 257 | 0.87 |
| Turnout | | 29,683 | 61.75 |
| Eligible voters | | 48,070 | |
| Liberal pickup new district. | | | |
Source: Elections Ontario

== See also ==
- List of Ontario provincial electoral districts
- Canadian provincial electoral districts
