= Tim Murphy (Canadian politician) =

Canadian politician

10th Chief of Staff to the Prime Minister
- In office December 2003 – January 2006
- Prime Minister: Paul Martin
- Preceded by: Eddie Goldenberg
- Succeeded by: Ian Brodie

Ontario MPP
- In office 1993–1995
- Preceded by: Ian Scott
- Succeeded by: Al Leach
- Constituency: St. George—St. David

Personal details
- Born: August 7, 1959 (age 67) Barrie, Ontario
- Party: Liberal
- Spouse: Jane Thompson
- Children: 1
- Occupation: Lawyer

Timothy John Murphy (born August 7, 1959) is a Canadian executive and former politician who served as the chief of staff of the Prime Minister's Office under Paul Martin's government. He was CEO of McMillan LLP between 2022 and 2024, and is the current chair of the Windsor–Detroit Bridge Authority.

== Background ==
Tim Murphy was born in Barrie, Ontario. He obtained a Bachelor of Arts degree from Queen's University in 1982 and a law degree from the University of Toronto. He practiced law with Blake, Cassels & Graydon and also served as a special advisor to Attorney General Ian Scott and a senior advisor to Ontario Minister of Education Sean Conway. In 1989–90, he ran the Ontario Campaign during Paul Martin's first unsuccessful bid for the leadership of the Liberal Party of Canada. In 2022 he became CEO of McMillan LLP. He lives in Toronto with his wife and daughter.

== Politics ==
When Ian Scott resigned his legislative seat in late 1992, a by-election was called for April 1, 1993 to replace him. Murphy ran to succeed Scott as the Liberal member for St. George—St. David, and was successful in both winning the nomination and defeating Progressive Conservative Nancy Jackman by 2,232 votes in the by-election.

St. George—St. David, which is now part of Toronto Centre, included the Church and Wellesley neighbourhood, the largest gay village in Ontario. Although Murphy is not himself gay, he soon emerged as a leading spokesperson in the Ontario legislature for progressive legislation pertaining to the rights of same-sex couples, introducing a private member's bill in 1993 which would have partially extended spousal benefits. He was one of only three Liberal MPPs, along with Jean Poirier and Dianne Poole, to support Bill 167, the Bob Rae government's more sweeping same-sex benefits package in 1994, and was critical of Liberal leader Lyn McLeod's decision to oppose the bill.

Murphy was defeated in the 1995 provincial election, losing his seat to Progressive Conservative Al Leach by 337 votes while New Democratic candidate Brent Hawkes was a close third.

== Later life ==
He returned to practicing law with McCarthy Tétrault, and served for a time as president of the Ontario Liberal Party. He supported Dwight Duncan's bid for the Ontario party leadership in 1996.

On June 28, 2001, Murphy was hired by Canadian Finance Minister Paul Martin as a senior political advisor. When Martin became Prime Minister in late 2003, he appointed Murphy as his chief of staff. Murphy was considered to be one of the most influential figures in the Canadian Prime Minister's Office, helping formulate policy matters as well as coordinating meetings with ministers and departments and with foreign heads of state.

After the Martin government was defeated in the 2006 federal election, Murphy returned to Toronto where he joined the law firm of McMillan Binch Mendelsohn.

Murphy served as a political panelist on Global's coverage of the 2006 Liberal leadership convention. He was co-chair of the Wynne campaign in the Ontario provincial election.

In 2016 he was part of the founding team of McMillan Vantage Policy Group, a national full-service public affairs consultancy—the only one of its kind anchored in a national law firm offering services to Canadian-based and international clients.

He is an adjunct Professor at the University of Toronto Faculty of Law teaching the Law and Policy of Public Private Partnerships at the JD and LLM levels.

He is a frequent commentator on CBC News Network's Power & Politics, and has also written articles for Policy Options, The Walrus, Canadian Public Administration Journal and The Globe and Mail, Ottawa Citizen and Toronto Star.

Between 2021 and 2023, he was chair of the Windsor–Detroit Bridge Authority.
