= Henry James Price =

Canadian politician

Ontario MPP
- In office 1955–1971
- Preceded by: Everett Weaver
- Succeeded by: Margaret Scrivener
- Constituency: St. David

Personal details
- Born: October 17, 1919 Owen Sound, Ontario
- Died: December 21, 1989 (aged 70) Toronto, Ontario
- Party: Progressive Conservative
- Spouse: Dorothy Louise Aziz (m.1946)
- Children: 2

Henry James Price (October 17, 1919 – December 21, 1989) was a Canadian politician, who represented St. David in the Legislative Assembly of Ontario from 1955 to 1971 as a Progressive Conservative member.

== Background ==
He was born in Owen Sound, Ontario. In 1949, he married Dorothy Louise Aziz. They raised two children. He died in 1989.

== Politics ==
Price was elected in the general election in 1955 and he was re-elected in the general elections in 1959, 1963 and 1967. During his time in office, he served on a large number of Standing Committees, though he did not serve in Cabinet.
