= Joe Cressy =

Canadian politician

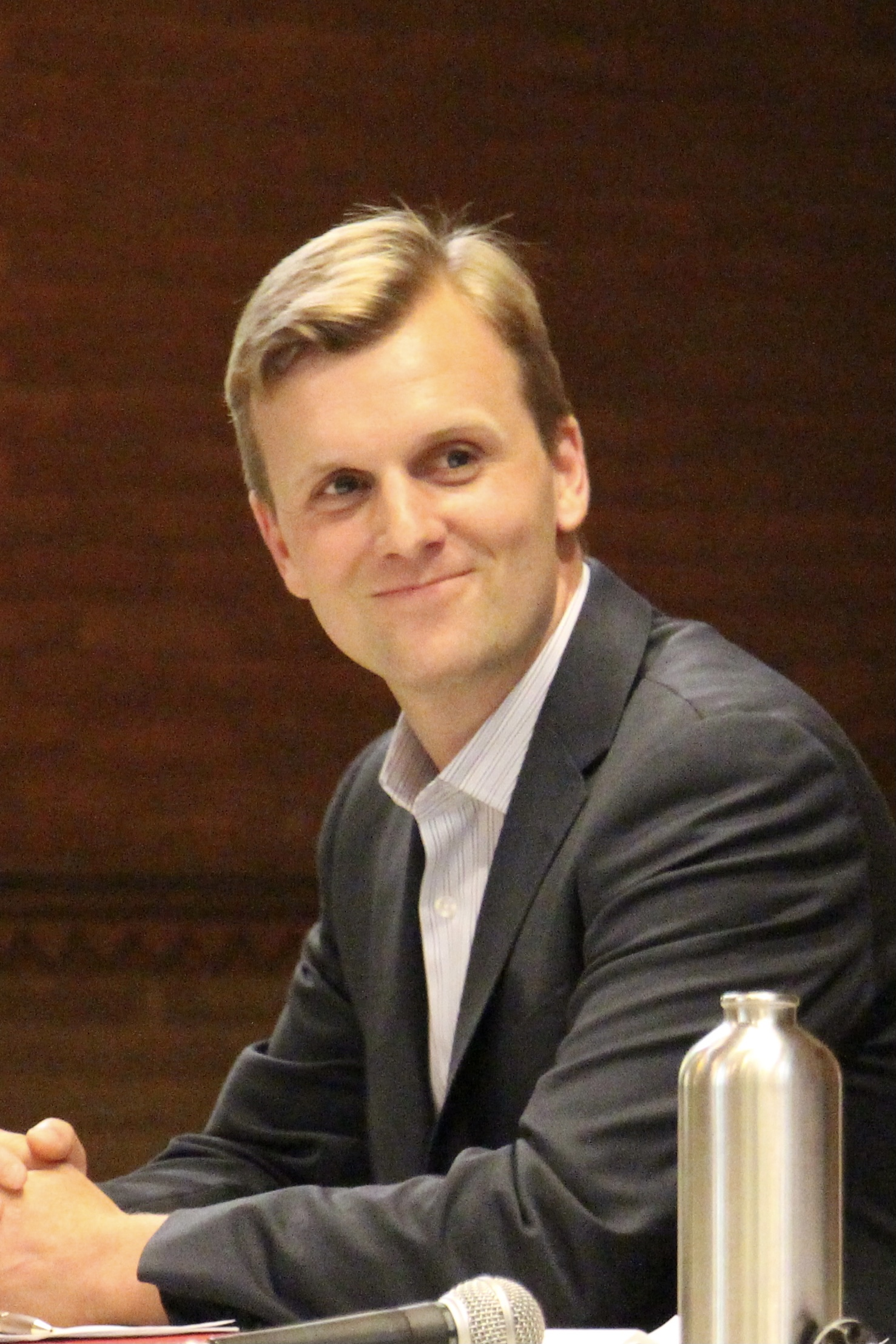
- Cressy in 2014

Toronto City Councillor for Ward 10 Spadina—Fort York
- In office December 1, 2018 – April 30, 2022
- Preceded by: Ward created
- Succeeded by: Joe Mihevc

Chair of the Toronto Board of Health
- In office January 30, 2019 – April 30, 2022
- Preceded by: Joe Mihevc
- Succeeded by: Joe Mihevc

Toronto City Councillor for Ward 20 Trinity—Spadina
- In office December 1, 2014 – December 1, 2018
- Preceded by: Ceta Ramkhalawansingh
- Succeeded by: Ward dissolved

Personal details
- Born: July 10, 1984 (age 42) Toronto, Ontario
- Party: Nonpartisan (municipal)
- Other political affiliations: New Democratic (federal)
- Spouse(s): Nina Gorka (m. 2013; div. 2016) Grace O'Connell (m. 2018)
- Parent(s): Gordon Cressy; Joanne Campbell
- Website: www.joecressy.com

Joseph Cressy (born July 10, 1984) is a former Canadian politician and activist who served on the Toronto City Council from 2014 to 2022. Cressy represented Ward 10 Spadina—Fort York, and was the chair of the Toronto Board of Health. On 22 April 2024, Cressy announced on X that he had joined Waterfront Toronto as its chief of staff.

== Career ==
=== Activism ===
Cressy has worked on various social justice issues, which traces back to high school when he spent a year in South Africa. Upon returning to high school in Toronto, he got involved in the anti-Iraq war movement and has since worked on anti-poverty campaigns in South Africa, literacy programs with First Nations communities in Northern Ontario, and worked with The Stop Community Food Centre.

Cressy also supports LGBTQ issues, volunteering for an LGBTQ organization while studying abroad in Accra and supporting the New Democratic Party's (NDP) call for a visa ban against legislators who passed anti-gay laws in Russia.

=== Federal politics ===
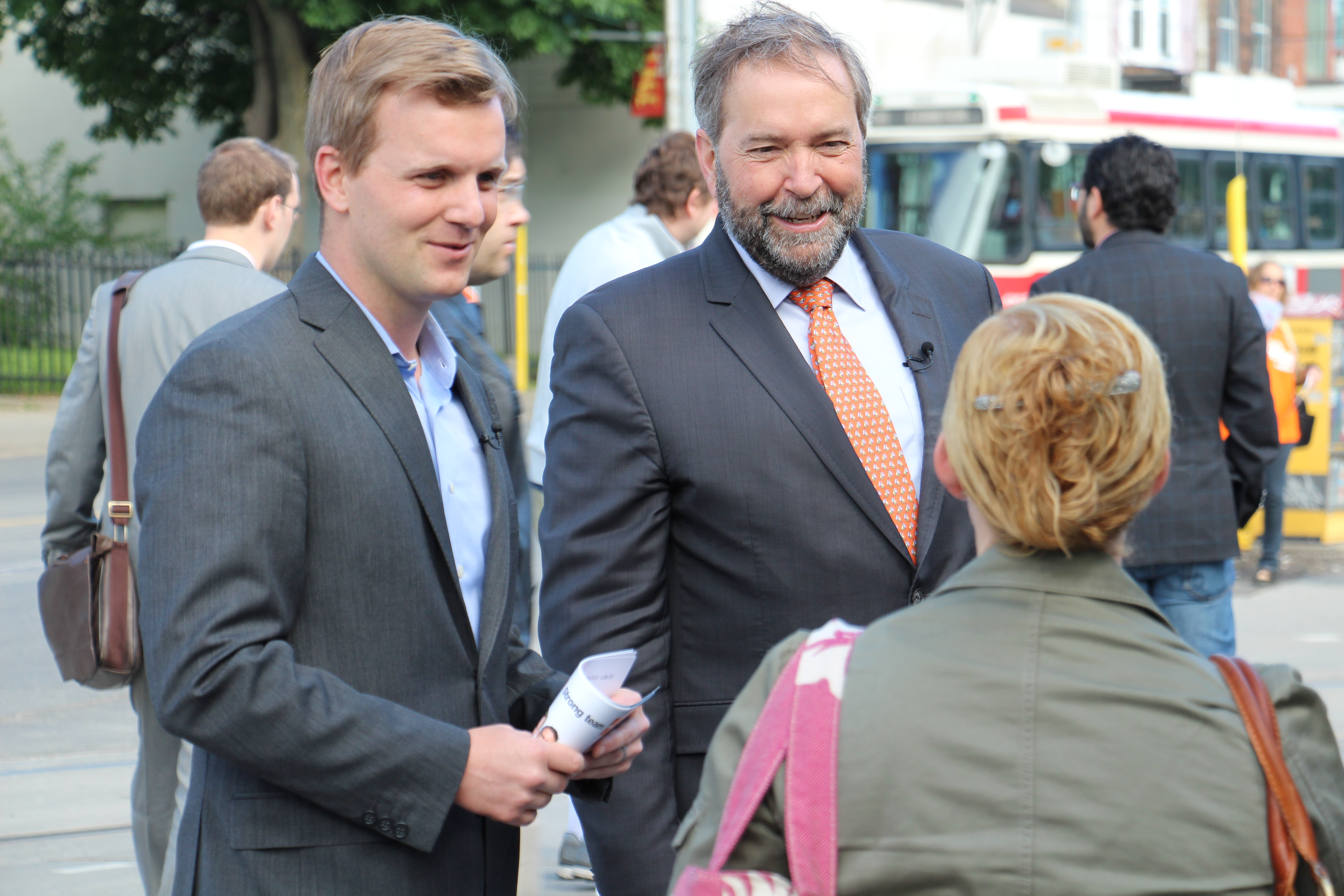
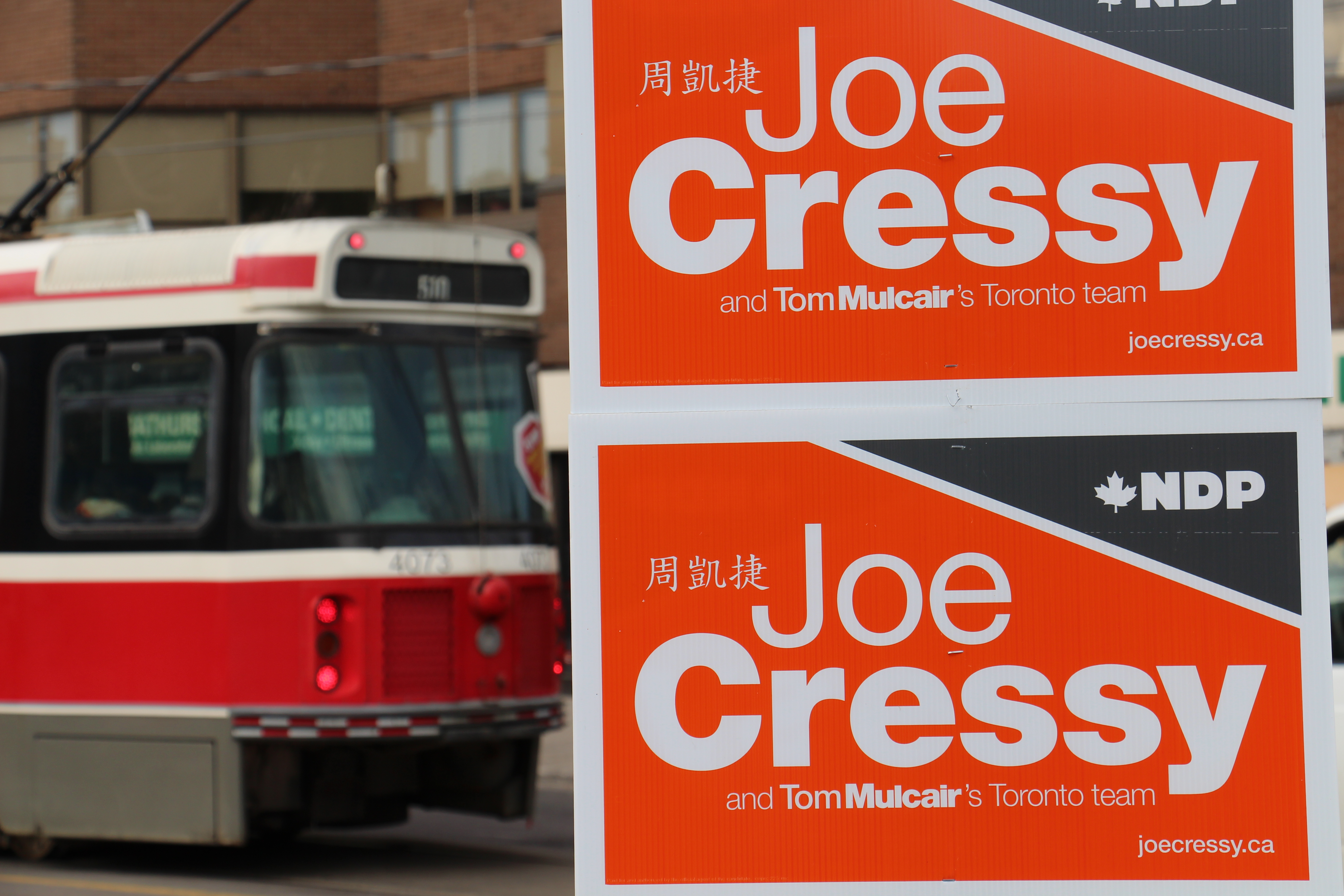
Cressy canvassing with NDP leader Thomas Mulcair (top) and campaign signs on Spadina Avenue (bottom)

Cressy ran for the New Democratic Party (NDP) in a by-election seeking to represent Trinity—Spadina in the House of Commons following former NDP member of Parliament (MP) Olivia Chow's resignation to run for mayor of Toronto in the 2014 mayoral election. Cressy placed second, following winner Adam Vaughan who previously represented Ward 20 on Toronto City Council.

=== Toronto City Council ===
Following his defeat federally, Cressy ran and was elected in the 2014 municipal election in Ward 20 Trinity—Spadina, succeeding Ceta Ramkhalawansingh, who was appointed interim councillor following Vaughan's resignation to run for MP.

As councillor, Cressy has sat on the Toronto Board of Health (serving as chair), the board of directors for Toronto Community Housing, the Parks and Environment Committee and the sub-committee on Climate Change and Adaptation.

Cressy ran again in the 2018 municipal election in the newly formed Ward 10 Spadina—Fort York, which his old ward was amalgamated into. He was re-elected by one of the widest victory margins of any councillor in the city with 55.06 per cent of the vote.

Cressy has announced he intends to retire from electoral politics and did not stand in the 2022 Toronto municipal election. He resigned from city council, effective April 30, 2022, to accept an appointment as senior vice president for external relations, communications and real estate development at George Brown College.

== Personal life ==
Cressy is the son of former Toronto city councillors Gordon Cressy and Joanne Campbell. His birth in 1984 made Campbell the first woman in Toronto City Council history to give birth to a child while serving as a councillor.

He studied public affairs and policy management at Carleton University. Prior to his entry into electoral politics, he worked for the Stephen Lewis Foundation and the Polaris Institute, and was campaign manager for Mike Layton's (son of former federal NDP leader Jack Layton) successful campaign for a city council seat in the 2010 municipal election and NDP MP Olivia Chow's re-election campaign in the 2011 federal election. He was also initially involved in Chow's mayoral campaign in 2014, but withdrew when he decided to run in the Trinity—Spadina by-election.

== Election results ==
2018 Toronto municipal election, Ward 10 Spadina—Fort York
Candidate	Votes	Vote share
Joe Cressy	15,903	55.06%
April Engelberg	3,346	11.58%
Kevin Vuong	3,018	10.45%
Sabrina Zuniga	1,564	5.41%
John Nguyen	1,032	3.57%
Karlene Nation	860	2.98%
Rick Myers	747	2.59%
Dean Maher	611	2.12%
Al Carbone	519	1.8%
Andrew Massey	473	1.64%
Michael Barcelos	451	1.56%
Edris Zalmai	147	0.51%
Andrei Zodian	133	0.46%
Ahdam Dour	80	0.28%
Total	28,884	100%
Source: City of Toronto

2014 Toronto election, Ward 20
Candidate	Votes	%
Joe Cressy	12,466	41.96
Terri Chu	3,693	12.43
Sarah Thomson	2,808	9.45
Mike Yen	1,431	4.81
Philip Morrison	1,407	4.73
Anshul Kapoor	1,063	3.57
Charles MacDonald	972	3.27
Albert Koehl	853	2.87
Tonny Louie	740	2.49
Daryl Christoff	705	2.37
Mike Andreae	590	1.98
Sam Goldstein	519	1.74
Nick Wright	395	1.33
Stephanie Carty-Kegel	376	1.26
Sam Novak	376	1.26
Garaham Hollings	307	1.03
Stella Kargiannakis	286	0.96
Leanne Hicks	212	0.71
Susan Tsai	194	0.65
Michael Monaghan	128	0.43
Kat Shermack	102	0.34
Akeem Fasasi	86	0.28
Total	29,709	100

Unofficial results as of October 27, 2014 10:05 PM

Canadian federal by-election, June 30, 2014: Trinity—Spadina Resignation of Olivia Chow
Party	Candidate	Votes	%	±%
Liberal	Adam Vaughan	18,547	53.66	+30.27
New Democratic	Joe Cressy	11,802	34.14	−20.37
Conservative	Benjamin Sharma	2,022	5.85	−10.96
Green	Camille Labchuk	1,880	5.44	+1.06
Christian Heritage	Linda Groce-Gibbons	174	0.50	–
Independent	John "The Engineer" Turmel	141	0.41	–
Total valid votes/expense limit		34,566	99.68	–
Total rejected ballots		111	0.32	−0.14
Turnout		34,677	31.45	−33.50
Eligible voters		110,252		
Liberal gain from New Democratic		Swing		+25.32
By-election due to the resignation of Olivia Chow to run in the 2014 Toronto mayoral election.
Source: Elections Canada
