= David Reville =

Canadian politician

Member of Ontario Provincial Parliament for Riverdale
- In office May 2, 1985 – September 6, 1990
- Preceded by: Jim Renwick
- Succeeded by: Marilyn Churley

City Councillor, Ward 7
- In office December 1, 1980 – November 30, 1985 Serving with Gordon Cressy (1980-1982), Joanne Campbell (1982-1985)
- Preceded by: Janet Howard
- Succeeded by: Barbara Hall

Personal details
- Born: April 19, 1943 (age 83) Brantford, Ontario
- Party: New Democrat
- Education: Trinity College, Toronto
- Profession: Consultant

David R. Reville (born April 19, 1943) is a former politician in Ontario, Canada, and an activist and educator active in Mad Pride, mad studies, and disability studies. Reville was a New Democratic member of the Legislative Assembly of Ontario from 1985 to 1990 who represented the downtown Toronto riding of Riverdale. Between 1990 and 1995 he was an advisor to the government of Bob Rae.

== Background ==
Reville was born in Brantford, Ontario. After graduating from Brantford Collegiate Institute in 1961, he attended Trinity College at the University of Toronto and proceeded to law school. It was expected that he would follow the career path of his father, an Ontario judge. Instead, Reville became manic-depressive and attempted to kill himself during his law studies. He was institutionalized in a psychiatric hospital and became a crusader for mental health reform upon his release.

During an interview with Canadian Press, Reville intoned, tongue firmly in cheek, "I became a New Democrat because I was mentally ill" and was bemused when his statement appeared as a headline in newspapers across the country. He was making the point that he had begun to learn something about powerlessness in hospital, and joined the NDP to fight for marginalized people. He once joked that he was the only MPP with a certificate to prove that he was sane.

== Politics ==
Reville served on Toronto's city council from 1980 to 1985, and emerged as a popular alderman in the downtown area. Known primarily for his work on affordable housing, he was responsible for an environmental first. He got Council to award intervenor funding for a community group to be involved in the environmental assessment of a proposed refuse-fired steam plant. Out of the group that organized around the issue came two popular politicians, Marilyn Churley and Peter Tabuns, both of whom were City Councillors before being elected to the legislature. David was elected to the Ontario legislature in the 1985 provincial election, winning an easy victory in Riverdale. He was re-elected in the 1987 election, defeating future Liberal Member of Parliament and then City Councillor Jim Karygiannis by about 1,500 votes. Reville was an opposition MPP throughout his time in the legislature. He was proud to be the author of a private member's bill that brought roomers and boarders under the protection of the Landlord and Tenant Act for the first time. (Bill 10)

=== Electoral record ===
1985 Ontario general election: Riverdale
Party	Candidate	Votes	%
New Democratic	David Reville	9,869	52.2
Progressive Conservative	Bret Snider	4,590	24.3
Liberal	Doug DeMille	3,949	20.9
Communist	Maggie Bizzell	322	1.7
Green	Michael Tegtmeyer	192	1.0
Total		18,922	
Canadian Press.

1987 Ontario general election: Riverdale
Party	Candidate	Votes	%
New Democratic	David Reville	10,321	44.9
Liberal	Jim Karygiannis	8,552	37.2
Progressive Conservative	Bob Dodd	3,285	14.3
Green	Debora Hojman	330	1.4
Libertarian	Byron Garby	292	1.3
Communist	Maggie Bizzell	210	0.9
Total		22,990	
Toronto Star.

== Later life ==
Reville did not seek re-election in 1990, arguing that he wanted to devote his time to more useful pursuits. After the NDP won a majority government in the 1990 provincial election, he served as a senior advisor to Premier Bob Rae.

In 1994, Reville was appointed chair of the Ontario Advocacy Commission but it was disbanded by the Mike Harris government less than two years later. In 2001, he received an award from the Council of Canadians with Disabilities. He ran a consulting company called David Reville & Associates specializing in social research and community development. As a consultant to the Centre for Addiction and Mental Health, he helped develop the augmented education program at George Brown College; the award-winning program helps people with mental health and addictions histories get their first jobs in the construction and culinary industries.

In 2004, Reville began teaching for the School of Disability Studies at Ryerson University (now Toronto Metropolitan University); one of his courses was called A History of Madness and the other Mad Peoples' History which received the Canadian Association for University Continuing Education Award of Excellence in 2011. David was a key figure in the launch of mad studies as an academic discipline in Canada and in the U.K. He retired in 2014. That year, friends and colleagues honoured Reville by establishing the David Reville/Working for Change course bursary in Mad People's History; the winner is selected annually from the Working for Change community. Working for Change creates education and employment opportunities for people with mental health and addictions challenges. Reville was awarded an honorary Doctor of Laws by Queen's University in 2015.

Singing has been a big part of his life. He was a member, man and boy, of the choir at Grace Anglican Church in Brantford for 10 years. He sang at the Mariposa Folk Festival with the Spadina Road Tabernacle Band in 1980 and at Carnegie Hall with new choir, Toronto's first rock choir in 2015. He was a member of the Eastminster United Church choir in Toronto (2014-2019).
