= Everett Weaver =

Canadian politician (1901–1971)

Toronto City Councillor
- In office 1947–1950 Serving with Louis Shannon
- Preceded by: May Birchard
- Succeeded by: Joseph Cornish and Beverley Sparling
- Constituency: Ward 2, Cabbagetown-Rosedale

Ontario MPP
- In office 1951–1955
- Preceded by: William Dennison
- Succeeded by: Henry Price
- Constituency: St. David

Personal details
- Born: Everett Lane Weaver; 1901; Hespeler, Ontario
- Died: 1971; Toronto, Ontario
- Political party: Progressive Conservative
- Occupation: Lawyer

Everett Lane Weaver (1901 - 1971) was a Canadian politician, who served on Toronto City Council and in the Legislative Assembly of Ontario.

A lawyer, he was first elected to city council in the 1947 municipal election, and served for three years as councillor for Ward 2 (Cabbagetown and Rosedale). He was elected to the provincial legislature in the 1951 election, representing the district of St. David as a member of the Ontario Progressive Conservative Party. He served until 1955, and did not stand for re-election in the 1955 election.

He returned to his work as a lawyer, and was appointed as a county court judge in 1958. As a judge, he was most noted for his ruling in a 1964 trial that the novel Fanny Hill was obscene under the Criminal Code.

He died in 1971.
