= Gordon Cressy =

Gordon Cressy OOnt
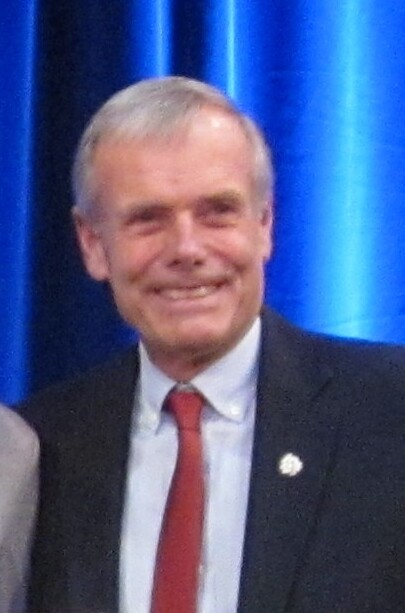
- Cressy in 2019

Toronto City Councillor for Ward 7
- In office 1978–1982 Serving with Janet Howard (1978-1980); David Reville (1980-1982)
- Preceded by: John Sewell
- Succeeded by: Joanne Campbell

Metro Toronto Councillor for Ward 7
- In office 1978–1982
- Preceded by: John Sewell
- Succeeded by: Joanne Campbell

Personal details
- Born: 1943 (age 82–83) Toronto, Ontario, Canada
- Party: Ontario New Democratic Party
- Spouse: Joanne Campbell (m.1983)
- Children: Joe Cressy (son)
- Occupation: social worker

Gordon Cressy OOnt (born 1943) is a former Canadian politician, who served on Toronto City Council from 1978 to 1982.

== Background ==
Cressy was born in 1943 in Toronto, and attended Lawrence Park Collegiate and Northern Secondary School. He graduated from George Williams College in Chicago in 1967 with a degree in science, and from the University of Toronto in 1969 with a Master of Social Work degree. He worked as executive director of a group home for teenagers, and as a project director for the Ontario Institute for Studies in Education.

== Political career ==
He first entered politics in 1970, winning election as a school trustee on the Toronto Board of Education. He served as chair of the board in 1975 and 1976.

Cressy ran as an Ontario New Democratic Party candidate in St. David for the 1977 provincial election, losing to incumbent MPP Margaret Scrivener. The following year, he won a seat on city council in the 1978 municipal election, succeeding John Sewell in the Ward 7 seat Sewell had vacated in order to run for Mayor of Toronto. As senior alderman, he also represented the ward on Metro Toronto Council. He served on the executive committees of both councils, as chairman of the Port Industrial Task Force in 1979, and as chairman of the Metropolitan Toronto Social Services and Housing Committee in 1980.

He retired from elected politics in 1982 to accept a job as president of the Toronto chapter of the United Way, and was succeeded in the 1982 municipal election by Joanne Campbell. At the time of the election, Campbell was an executive assistant in Cressy's office; she later married Cressy in 1983.

== Post-political life ==
Cressy remained with the United Way until 1987, when he left to join the University of Toronto as vice-president of institutional relations. He has since held similar positions with Ryerson University and George Brown College, and has worked on international development projects in Trinidad and Tobago.

His son Joe Cressy was elected to Toronto City Council in the 2014 municipal election. Gordon Cressy served on mayor-elect John Tory's transition team following the 2014 election.

== Honours ==
In 2016, he was made a member of the Order of Ontario.

In 1994, the University of Toronto Alumni Association established the Gordon Cressy Student Leadership Awards in his honour "to recognize students who have made outstanding extra-curricular contributions to their college, faculty or school, or to the university as a whole."
