= Carolann Wright =

Canadian activist

- Born: 1957 (age 68–69); Beechville, Nova Scotia
- Education: York University
- Occupation: Community Organizer
- Known for: 1988 Toronto municipal election

Carolann Wright is a Canadian activist and politician. Born in Nova Scotia, Wright lived in Toronto's Regent Park neighbourhood in the 1980s, where she was chair of the community residents association.

Wright was born the eldest of eight children in Beechville, Nova Scotia, a small Black community outside of Halifax, Nova Scotia where her family had lived since the 1800s. After attending Dalhousie University, she moved to Toronto in the 1970s to study commerce at York University. As a result of a failed relationship, she ended up homeless and living in a homeless shelter before re-establishing herself in the Regent Park neighbourhood of Toronto. She ultimately graduated from York, and found a job as a community worker running computer literacy classes for underprivileged children.

She ran against sitting mayor Art Eggleton in the 1988 Toronto municipal election, placing second with 17% of the vote. Her campaign was organized by the Basic Action Poverty Group, a group of church and community workers, and supported by "Reform Toronto", a coalition of community activists that included sitting city councillor Jack Layton and Metro Toronto councillor Roger Hollander and former councillors William Kilbourn and Allan Sparrow/ She ran on a platform of raising welfare payments by 25%, an amnesty for illegal apartments, more rooming houses.

She was the first woman of colour to run for the office, and the last prominent contender until Olivia Chow ran in 2015. Wright's campaign was endorsed by Reform Toronto and the Basic Action Poverty Group. Wright ran on advocated raising increasing welfare payments by 25%, licensing more rooming houses in the city, and legalizing "illegal" apartments in subdivided houses

Two years later, she ran in the 1990 Ontario general election against Ian Scott for MP of St. George—St. David, losing the election by 65 votes, after a recount.

In the mid-1990s, she left Toronto and moved back to Nova Scotia where she has worked for a series of community organizations in Halifax, and is currently director of community economic development and strategic engagement for African Nova Scotian communities for the Halifax Regional Municipality's economic development organization, Halifax Partnership.
