= St. David (provincial electoral district) =

Former provincial electoral district in Ontario, Canada

Coordinates: 43.6638°N 79.3657°W

Ontario electoral district
- St. David, in relation to the other Toronto ridings, after the 1926 redistribution.

Defunct provincial electoral district
- Legislature: Legislative Assembly of Ontario
- District created: 1925
- District abolished: 1987
- First contested: 1926
- Last contested: 1985

St. David was a provincial electoral district in Ontario, Canada, that existed from 1926 to 1987. It covered a section of the eastern city of Toronto east of Sherbourne Street and west of the Don River. The riding lasted until 1987 when it was merged with the neighbouring St. George to create a larger district called St. George—St. David.

== Boundaries ==
In 1926 the riding was carved out of the existing ridings of Toronto Northeast and Toronto Southeast with the following boundaries. The southern boundary was Toronto Harbour. Going north along the west side it formed a line following Sherbourne Street north to Bloor Street. The boundary went west to Yonge Street and north along Yonge to St. Clair Avenue. It went east along St. Clair until the street was interrupted by the Moore Park ravine. It followed the ravine southeast towards the Don River and then followed the river until it entered Toronto Harbour.

Prior to the 1934 election, the riding boundary at the north end was changed. Instead of following Bloor Street, the boundary instead went north following Sherbourne Street where it turned into MacLennan Avenue (now Sherbourne Street North). It followed this street north to the CPR right-of-way. It then went west along the right-of-way until it reached the Vale of Avoca ravine now occupied by David Balfour Park. It followed ravine north through the Mount Pleasant Cemetery until it reached a point where Yonge Street was crossed by the former Belt Line Railway right-of-way. It then turned east following the original Belt Line right-of-way which curved south to join up with the path of Mud Creek. It then went southeast towards the Don River.

In 1945 the northern boundary was altered to reflect a new street configuration. MacLennan Avenue was replaced by the following line of neighbourhood streets: Sherbourne Street North, Glen Road, Highland Avenue, Schofield Avenue before rejoining MacLennan Avenue. The southwest boundary was altered slightly so that the boundary followed the Don Roadway south instead of following the Keating Channel west.

In 1967 the boundaries were significantly altered. Starting at the foot of Parliament Street, the western boundary headed north to Bloor Street. It then headed west to Yonge Street where it turned north again ending at Davisville Avenue just south of Eglinton Avenue. The boundary then went east along Davisville to Bayview Avenue, then south along Bayview to Moore Avenue, west along Moore Avenue before heading southeast following the Mud Creek to the Don River. The river was followed to a point just north of the Bloor Viaduct where the old Toronto city limits was met. It turned east following the city limits until it reached Jackman Avenue. The boundary then turned south and followed Jackman Avenue, Hampton Avenue, Sparkhall Avenue, Broadview Avenue, Gerrard Street East, DeGrassi Street, Queen Street East and finally Carlaw Avenue and this was followed south to end at the outer Toronto Harbour.

In 1975 the northern boundary was altered slightly. It was moved north from Davisville Avenue to Manor Road between Yonge Street and Bayview Avenue. No other changes were made. The boundaries remained like this until 1987 when it was merged with the neighbouring riding of St. George to form St. George—St. David.

== Members of Provincial Parliament ==
St. David
| Assembly | Years | Member | Party |
|---|---|---|---|
Created in 1926 from parts of Toronto Northeast and Toronto Southeast
| 17th | 1926–1929 | Joseph Thompson | Conservative |
| 18th | 1929–1934 | Wilfrid Heighington | Conservative |
| 19th | 1934–1937 | Wilfrid Heighington | Conservative |
| 20th | 1937–1943 | Allan Lamport (Note: In 1938, the title of Member of the Legislative Assembly was officially changed to Member of Provincial Parliament. Previously, it was unofficially used in the media and in the Legislature.) | Liberal |
| 21st | 1943–1945 | William Dennison | Co-operative Commonwealth |
| 22nd | 1945–1948 | Roland Michener | Progressive Conservative |
| 23rd | 1948–1951 | William Dennison | Co-operative Commonwealth |
| 24th | 1951–1955 | Everett Weaver | Progressive Conservative |
| 25th | 1955–1959 | Henry Price | Progressive Conservative |
| 26th | 1959–1963 | Henry Price | Progressive Conservative |
| 27th | 1963–1967 | Henry Price | Progressive Conservative |
| 28th | 1967–1971 | Henry Price | Progressive Conservative |
| 29th | 1971–1975 | Margaret Scrivener | Progressive Conservative |
| 30th | 1975–1977 | Margaret Scrivener | Progressive Conservative |
| 31st | 1977–1981 | Margaret Scrivener | Progressive Conservative |
| 32nd | 1981–1985 | Margaret Scrivener | Progressive Conservative |
| 33rd | 1985–1987 | Ian Scott | Liberal |
Sourced from the Ontario Legislative Assembly
Merged with St. George to form St. George—St. David after 1987

== Election results ==
1985 Ontario general election
| Party | Candidate | Votes | % | ±% |
|---|---|---|---|---|
| Liberal | Ian Scott | 13,120 | 46.98 | +11.80 |
| Progressive Conservative | Julian Porter | 9,702 | 34.74 | –4.62 |
| New Democratic | Barbara Hall | 4,878 | 17.47 | –7.00 |
| Libertarian | Earl H. Epstein | 228 | 0.82 | – |
| Total valid votes | | 27,928 | 99.30 | |
| Total rejected ballots | | 196 | 0.70 | +0.04 |
| Turnout | | 28,124 | 69.32 | +4.65 |
| Eligible voters | | 40,574 | | |
| Liberal gain from Progressive Conservative | | Swing | | +8.21 |
Source: Elections Ontario

1981 Ontario general election
| Party | Candidate | Votes | % | ±% |
|---|---|---|---|---|
| Progressive Conservative | Margaret Scrivener | 9,627 | 39.36 | –4.78 |
| Liberal | Ian Scott | 8,605 | 35.18 | +21.10 |
| New Democratic | Tyrone Turner | 5,985 | 24.47 | –16.57 |
| Independent | Rhino Mappin | 243 | 0.99 | – |
| Total valid votes | | 24,460 | 99.35 | |
| Total rejected ballots | | 161 | 0.65 | –0.13 |
| Turnout | | 24,621 | 64.67 | –4.93 |
| Eligible voters | | 38,074 | | |
| Progressive Conservative hold | | Swing | | –12.94 |
Source: Elections Ontario

1977 Ontario general election
| Party | Candidate | Votes | % | ±% |
|---|---|---|---|---|
| Progressive Conservative | Margaret Scrivener | 11,894 | 44.14 | +3.86 |
| New Democratic | Gordon Cressy | 11,058 | 41.03 | +10.29 |
| Liberal | Robert M. McClelland | 3,794 | 14.08 | –13.22 |
| Communist | Shane Parkhill | 202 | 0.75 | –0.03 |
| Total valid votes | | 26,948 | 99.22 | |
| Total rejected ballots | | 213 | 0.78 | +0.17 |
| Turnout | | 27,161 | 69.60 | +3.31 |
| Eligible voters | | 39,026 | | |
| Progressive Conservative hold | | Swing | | –3.21 |
Source: Elections Ontario

1975 Ontario general election
| Party | Candidate | Votes | % | ±% |
|---|---|---|---|---|
| Progressive Conservative | Margaret Scrivener | 10,536 | 40.27 | –9.80 |
| New Democratic | Jim Lemon | 8,043 | 30.74 | +0.56 |
| Liberal | June Rowlands | 7,141 | 27.30 | +8.75 |
| Libertarian | Vincent H. Miller | 237 | 0.91 | – |
| Communist | Anna Larsen | 205 | 0.78 | – |
| Total valid votes | | 26,162 | 99.38 | |
| Total rejected ballots | | 162 | 0.62 | –0.06 |
| Turnout | | 26,324 | 66.29 | –4.17 |
| Eligible voters | | 39,712 | | |
| Progressive Conservative hold | | Swing | | –5.18 |
Source: Elections Ontario

1971 Ontario general election
| Party | Candidate | Votes | % | ±% |
|---|---|---|---|---|
| Progressive Conservative | Margaret Scrivener | 13,320 | 50.07 | +13.45 |
| New Democratic | Giles Endicott | 8,029 | 30.18 | –0.51 |
| Liberal | Gerald (Gerry) Tooke | 4,934 | 18.55 | –14.14 |
| Social Credit | R. H. James | 320 | 1.20 | – |
| Total valid votes | | 26,603 | 99.32 | |
| Total rejected ballots | | 182 | 0.68 | –0.26 |
| Turnout | | 26,785 | 70.46 | +6.18 |
| Eligible voters | | 38,017 | | |
| Progressive Conservative hold | | Swing | | +6.98 |
Source: Elections Ontario

1967 Ontario general election
| Party | Candidate | Votes | % | ±% |
|---|---|---|---|---|
| Progressive Conservative | Henry James Price | 7,581 | 36.62 | –6.36 |
| Liberal | Joseph H. Potts | 6,766 | 32.68 | –6.62 |
| New Democratic | Giles Endicott | 6,354 | 30.69 | +15.50 |
| Total valid votes | | 20,701 | 99.06 | |
| Total rejected ballots | | 197 | 0.94 | –0.69 |
| Turnout | | 20,898 | 64.28 | +5.37 |
| Eligible voters | | 32,513 | | |
| Progressive Conservative hold | | Swing | | +0.13 |
Source: Elections Ontario

=== 1945 electoral boundaries ===
1963 Ontario general election
| Party | Candidate | Votes | % | ±% |
|---|---|---|---|---|
| Progressive Conservative | Henry James Price | 6,051 | 42.98 | –0.71 |
| Liberal | Joseph H. Potts | 5,533 | 39.30 | +7.03 |
| New Democratic | Giles Endicott | 2,139 | 15.19 | –7.14 |
| Communist | Charles Weir | 220 | 1.56 | – |
| Social Credit | George Alexander Leslie | 135 | 0.96 | – |
| Total valid votes | | 14,078 | 98.37 | |
| Total rejected ballots | | 234 | 1.64 | +0.07 |
| Turnout | | 14,312 | 58.91 | +7.44 |
| Eligible voters | | 24,295 | | |
| Progressive Conservative hold | | Swing | | –3.87 |
Source: Elections Ontario

1959 Ontario general election
| Party | Candidate | Votes | % | ±% |
|---|---|---|---|---|
| Progressive Conservative | Henry James Price | 5,813 | 43.70 | +6.52 |
| Liberal | Leslie Sharpe | 4,293 | 32.27 | +4.46 |
| Co-operative Commonwealth | Thomas (Tom) McAulay | 2,971 | 22.33 | –11.21 |
| Labor–Progressive | Larry Arsenault | 226 | 1.70 | +0.23 |
| Total valid votes | | 13,303 | 98.44 | |
| Total rejected ballots | | 211 | 1.56 | –0.69 |
| Turnout | | 13,514 | 51.47 | –7.72 |
| Eligible voters | | 26,257 | | |
| Progressive Conservative hold | | Swing | | +1.03 |
Source: Elections Ontario

1955 Ontario general election
| Party | Candidate | Votes | % | ±% |
|---|---|---|---|---|
| Progressive Conservative | Henry James Price | 5,747 | 37.18 | –3.46 |
| Co-operative Commonwealth | William Dennison | 5,186 | 33.55 | +0.18 |
| Liberal | James Karfilis | 4,299 | 27.81 | +1.81 |
| Labor–Progressive | William Repka | 227 | 1.47 | – |
| Total valid votes | | 15,459 | 97.75 | |
| Total rejected ballots | | 356 | 2.25 | +0.24 |
| Turnout | | 15,815 | 59.19 | +1.39 |
| Eligible voters | | 26,721 | | |
| Progressive Conservative hold | | Swing | | –1.82 |
Source: Elections Ontario

1951 Ontario general election
| Party | Candidate | Votes | % | ±% |
|---|---|---|---|---|
| Progressive Conservative | Everett Weaver | 6,880 | 40.64 | +2.53 |
| Co-operative Commonwealth | William Dennison | 5,648 | 33.36 | –8.02 |
| Liberal | Ralph C. Henson | 4,401 | 26.00 | +7.06 |
| Total valid votes | | 16,929 | 97.99 | |
| Total rejected ballots | | 347 | 2.01 | +0.47 |
| Turnout | | 17,276 | 57.80 | –8.29 |
| Eligible voters | | 29,891 | | |
| Progressive Conservative gain from Co-operative Commonwealth | | Swing | | +5.28 |
Source: Elections Ontario

1948 Ontario general election
| Party | Candidate | Votes | % | ±% |
|---|---|---|---|---|
| Co-operative Commonwealth | William Dennison | 8,539 | 41.39 | +13.86 |
| Progressive Conservative | Roland Michener | 7,863 | 38.11 | –4.13 |
| Liberal | Peter Wright | 3,908 | 18.94 | –5.43 |
| Independent Labour | Roy Boskett | 253 | 1.23 | – |
| Socialist Labor | Paul Debragh | 69 | 0.33 | – |
| Total valid votes | | 20,632 | 98.46 | |
| Total rejected ballots | | 322 | 1.54 | +0.06 |
| Turnout | | 20,954 | 66.08 | +0.17 |
| Eligible voters | | 31,708 | | |
| Co-operative Commonwealth gain from Progressive Conservative | | Swing | | +9.00 |
Source: Elections Ontario

1945 Ontario general election
| Party | Candidate | Votes | % | ±% |
|---|---|---|---|---|
| Progressive Conservative | Roland Michener | 8,535 | 42.24 | +5.61 |
| Co-operative Commonwealth | William Dennison | 5,562 | 27.53 | –13.58 |
| Liberal | George A. Wilson | 4,924 | 24.37 | +2.11 |
| Labor–Progressive | Ray Stevenson | 1,183 | 5.86 | – |
| Total valid votes | | 20,204 | 98.52 | |
| Total rejected ballots | | 303 | 1.48 | +0.41 |
| Turnout | | 20,507 | 65.92 | +11.14 |
| Eligible voters | | 31,111 | | |
| Progressive Conservative gain from Co-operative Commonwealth | | Swing | | +9.60 |
Source: Elections Ontario

=== 1934 electoral boundaries ===
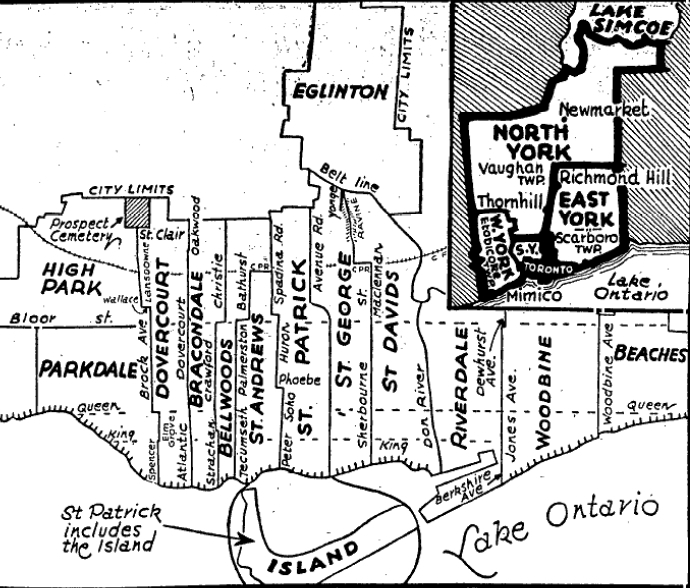
Toronto riding boundaries after 1934 redistribution

1943 Ontario general election
| Party | Candidate | Votes | % | ±% |
|---|---|---|---|---|
| Co-operative Commonwealth | William Dennison | 5,678 | 41.11 | +28.13 |
| Progressive Conservative | Roland Michener | 5,059 | 36.63 | –1.85 |
| Liberal | Allan Lamport | 3,074 | 22.26 | –20.92 |
| Total valid votes | | 13,811 | 98.93 | |
| Total rejected ballots | | 149 | 1.07 | –0.68 |
| Turnout | | 13,960 | 54.78 | –12.24 |
| Eligible voters | | 25,486 | | |
| Co-operative Commonwealth gain from Liberal | | Swing | | +24.53 |
Source: Elections Ontario

1937 Ontario general election
| Party | Candidate | Votes | % | ±% |
|---|---|---|---|---|
| Liberal | Allan Lamport | 7,703 | 43.18 | +9.25 |
| Conservative | Wilfrid Heighington | 6,864 | 38.48 | –2.03 |
| Co-operative Commonwealth | William Dennison | 2,315 | 12.98 | –12.58 |
| Independent Conservative | Henry Glendinning | 850 | 4.76 | – |
| Socialist Labor | William Campbell | 107 | 0.60 | – |
| Total valid votes | | 17,839 | 98.25 | |
| Total rejected ballots | | 318 | 1.75 | +0.22 |
| Turnout | | 18,157 | 67.02 | +2.39 |
| Eligible voters | | 27,093 | | |
| Liberal gain from Conservative | | Swing | | +5.64 |
Source: Elections Ontario

1934 Ontario general election
| Party | Candidate | Votes | % | ±% |
|---|---|---|---|---|
| Conservative | Wilfrid Heighington | 6,751 | 40.51 | –34.10 |
| Liberal | Patrick Donnelly | 5,656 | 33.94 | +8.54 |
| Co-operative Commonwealth | Frank Regan | 4,260 | 25.56 | – |
| Total valid votes | | 16,667 | 98.47 | |
| Total rejected ballots | | 259 | 1.53 | +0.81 |
| Turnout | | 16,926 | 64.63 | +27.67 |
| Eligible voters | | 26,189 | | |
| Conservative hold | | Swing | | –21.32 |
Source: Elections Ontario

=== 1926 electoral boundaries ===
1929 Ontario general election
| Party | Candidate | Votes | % | ±% |
|---|---|---|---|---|
| Conservative | Wilfrid Heighington | 7,199 | 74.60 | –3.08 |
| Liberal | James William Carrick | 2,451 | 25.40 | +3.08 |
| Total valid votes | | 9,650 | 99.28 | |
| Total rejected ballots | | 70 | 0.72 | +0.04 |
| Turnout | | 9,720 | 36.97 | –25.85 |
| Eligible voters | | 26,295 | | |
| Conservative hold | | Swing | | –3.08 |
Source: Elections Ontario

1926 Ontario general election
| Party | Candidate | Votes | % |
|---|---|---|---|
| Conservative | Joseph Thompson | 10,948 | 77.68 |
| Liberal | James Edward Forfar | 3,145 | 22.32 |
| Total valid votes | | 14,093 | 99.32 |
| Total rejected ballots | | 96 | 0.68 |
| Turnout | | 14,189 | 62.81 |
| Eligible voters | | 22,589 | |
| Conservative pickup new district. | | | |
Source: Elections Ontario

== See also ==
- List of Ontario provincial electoral districts
- Canadian provincial electoral districts
