= Ceta Ramkhalawansingh =

Toronto City Councillor for Ward 20 (Trinity—Spadina)
- In office July 7, 2014 – November 30, 2014
- Preceded by: Adam Vaughan
- Succeeded by: Joe Cressy

Personal details
- Born: Trinidad and Tobago
- Occupation: civil servant

Ceta Ramkhalawansingh is a Canadian civil servant and former politician, who was appointed on July 7, 2014 to represent Ward 20 (Trinity—Spadina) on Toronto City Council, following the resignation of Adam Vaughan.

== Background ==
Originally from Trinidad and Tobago, Ramkhalawansingh emigrated to Canada in 1967, and studied political science and economics at the University of Toronto. While still an undergraduate student at the University of Toronto, she was actively involved in establishing the women's studies program in 1971. Ramkhalawansingh also undertook graduate studies at the Institute for Child Study and at the Ontario Institute for Studies in Education (OISE) where she completed an MA degree and coursework towards a doctoral degree. She worked for the Toronto District School Board before joining the municipal staff at Toronto City Hall. Her final position with the city was as director of diversity management and civic engagement within the city staff, a position from which she retired in 2010.

As an activist in the downtown Toronto Grange neighbourhood, Ramkhalawansingh was involved with protecting rental housing, saving heritage buildings from demolition, campaigning for responsible and appropriate development, including restrictions upon institutional expansion.

Her work on women's issues was recognized by Toronto City Council in 2012 with the Constance E. Hamilton Award, whose recipients are selected by the women members of council.

== Council term ==
Ramkhalawansingh was appointed after a council vote that split along ideological lines, with mayor Rob Ford and most conservative councillors favouring former Peel Region police chief Robert Lunney. Ramkhalawansingh was elected by council on the second ballot with 22 votes to Lunney's 18. Her term ended on November 30, 2014; she did not stand as a candidate in the 2014 municipal election.

In August 2014, Ramkhalawansingh put forward a motion that Toronto City Council adopt a resolution to request that the federal government change the wording of "O Canada", specifically the line "all thy sons command", to be more gender-inclusive.

One of the important projects which she undertook while on council was the establishment of the Toronto Book Garden at Harbourfront Centre. The Toronto Book Garden highlights the literary hub established at Harbourfront Centre with the Toronto International Festival of Authors and The Word on the Street.

== Post-council work ==
In December 2015, she co-founded the Campaign for Gender Equality in the Senate, which urged the Prime Minister to fill all 22 vacant positions with women, which would have the effect of achieving complete gender parity.

In 2022, she announced that she was donating many of her career records to the University of Toronto Archives, as well as donating many books to the New College library.
