= Ian Scott (Ontario politician) =

Canadian lawyer and politician

Ian Scott OC
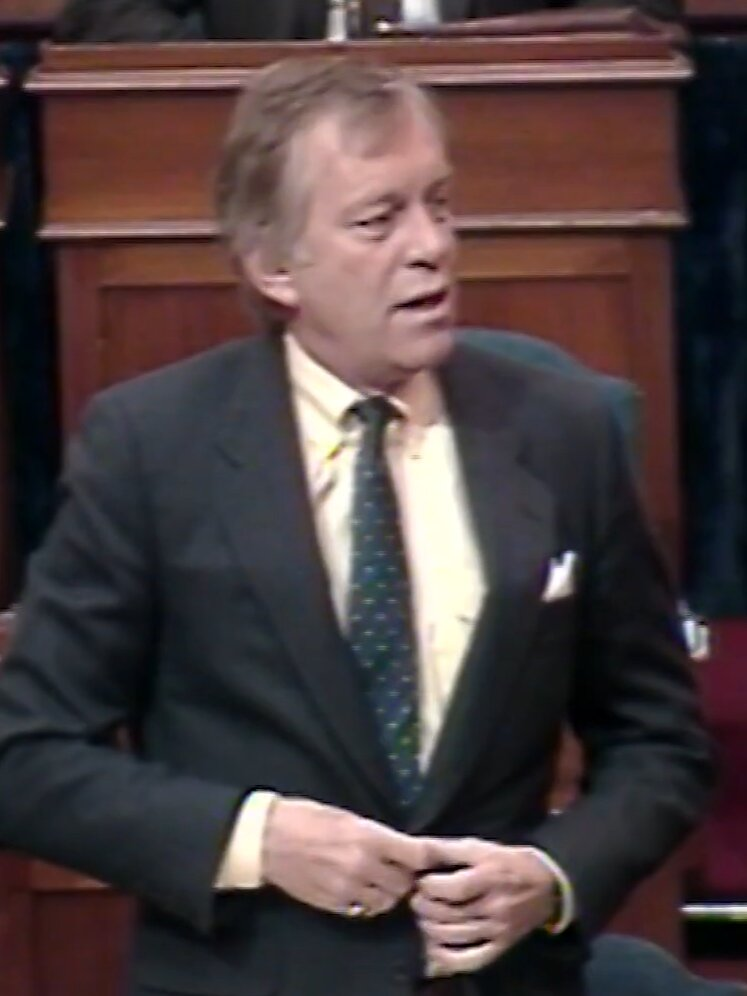
- Scott in 1986

Ontario MPP
- In office 1987–1992
- Preceded by: New riding
- Succeeded by: Tim Murphy
- Constituency: St. George—St. David
- In office 1985–1987
- Preceded by: Margaret Scrivener
- Succeeded by: Riding abolished
- Constituency: St. David

Personal details
- Born: July 13, 1934 Ottawa, Ontario, Canada
- Died: October 10, 2006 (aged 72) Toronto, Ontario, Canada
- Party: Liberal
- Domestic partner: Kim Yakabuski
- Occupation: Lawyer

Ian Gilmour Scott OC (July 13, 1934 – October 10, 2006) was a Canadian politician and lawyer. He was a Liberal member of the Legislative Assembly of Ontario from 1985 to 1992 who represented the downtown Toronto ridings of St. David and St. George—St. David. He was a cabinet minister in the government of David Peterson serving as Attorney General of Ontario and Solicitor General. Along with Robert Nixon and Sean Conway, he was considered to be "the intellectual heart and soul" of the Peterson cabinet.

== Biography ==
=== Family ===
Ian Gilmour Scott was born on July 13, 1934, at Ottawa Civic Hospital. His family had extensive political connections. One of his paternal great-grandfathers, Richard William Scott, was a prominent Canadian politician in the nineteenth century, and served for a time as government leader in the Senate of Canada. His other paternal great-grandfather was W.W. Sullivan, Premier of Prince Edward Island from 1879 to 1889.

Moreover, one of his maternal great-grandfathers was Andrew G. Blair, who served as Premier of New Brunswick from 1883 to 1896, when he joined Richard Scott in the federal Liberal cabinet. His father and paternal grandfather were also active supporters of the Liberal Party. In 1948, while still a schoolboy, Ian Scott co-wrote a number of speeches for Brooke Claxton, Liberal Minister of National Defence. Scott's brother, David W. Scott Q.C. was a prominent lawyer in Ottawa.

=== Early life and career ===
Scott graduated from St. Michael's College at the University of Toronto in 1955. He was president of the student council in his last year and was a member of the Alpha Delta Phi fraternity. After graduating, he earned a law degree from Osgoode Hall Law School in 1959 and began working under Andrew Brewin. The firm came to be called Cameron Brewin and Scott.

In addition to his courtroom work, Scott began teaching civil procedure at the University of Toronto Law School in 1968. One of his pupils was Bob Rae, whom he canvassed for in a 1978 by-election for the House of Commons of Canada. From 1974 to 1976, Scott worked for the Mackenzie Valley Pipeline Inquiry, studying the impact of pipeline development on aboriginal Canadians in the Northwest Territories.

=== Early political career ===
Scott first ran for public office in the provincial election of 1981. He once described his political views as "left of liberal" and had considered running for the Ontario New Democratic Party, but was unimpressed with the leadership abilities of Michael Cassidy. An opponent of the Progressive Conservative party that had governed Ontario since 1943, Scott instead chose to run for the Ontario Liberal Party under Stuart Smith, in the downtown Toronto riding of St. David. He lost to Progressive Conservative cabinet minister Margaret Scrivener by 1,022 votes.

Scott was, by his own admission, disillusioned with the direction of the Liberal Party in the early 1980s. He was not initially a supporter of David Peterson, who replaced Smith as Liberal leader in 1982 and whom Scott considered too far to the right. Scott had previously promised to run in the 1985 provincial election, but planned to back out of this promise in 1984. However, while driving to Peterson's cottage in Pand, he reconsidered and remained the Liberal candidate in St. David.

=== Attorney-General ===
The 1985 election was a watershed moment in Ontario politics. The Progressive Conservatives were reduced to a minority government, and the Liberals made considerable electoral inroads throughout the province. Scott was elected in St. David, defeating Tory candidate and personal friend Julian Porter by about 3,500 votes. After the election, Scott was one of the Liberal envoys who negotiated an accord with the NDP which allowed the two parties to defeat the Tories in a motion of non-confidence, and then allowed the Liberals to form a minority government with NDP support for two years. He was appointed Attorney General and Minister responsible for Native Affairs on June 26, 1985, and served in these positions throughout the Peterson administration. He was also the province's minister responsible for Women's Issues and Race Relations from 1985 to 1987, and was an acting Solicitor General on two occasions. In the 1987 provincial election, he was easily re-elected in the redistributed riding of St. George—St. David, defeating incumbent St. George Member of Provincial Parliament (MPP) Susan Fish of the Progressive Conservatives.

Scott had been a renowned constitutional lawyer prior to entering politics, and as Attorney-General, he took the unusual step of appearing in court on several occasions to personally argue the government's case. He was considered an activist attorney-general, and instituted a number of reforms including the abolition of appointments as Queen's Counsel, the introduction of Ontario's first freedom of information legislation, and the introduction of an independent panel to recommend judicial appointments (previously, the process had been seen as largely driven by patronage). He also oversaw the introduction of pay equity in the public sector, and introduced an amendment to the Ontario Human Rights Code to extend protection against discrimination on the basis of sexual orientation.

=== Out of government ===
Scott was narrowly re-elected in the 1990 election against Carolann Wright. After a recount, it was determined that Scott won by 65 votes.

The election defeated the Peterson government. He was challenged by former Tory cabinet minister Keith Norton, who had come out of the closet by this point, and ran as an openly gay politician. Scott was widely known to be gay, but declined to reveal it, and there were concerns in Scott's campaign that Norton would attempt to make an issue of this matter.

He was unhappy in opposition, and lost interest in the legislature after Murray Elston, his choice to replace Peterson as party leader, was narrowly defeated at the Liberal Party's 1992 leadership convention. Scott resigned his seat in the legislature in 1992.

He accepted a teaching position at York University, and remained in the public eye as a political panelist on television until a devastating stroke in 1994 made speech difficult for him. He developed aphasia following the stroke, and was forced to end his legal career.

He was made an officer of the Order of Canada in 1995. In the same year, he supported Joseph Cordiano's unsuccessful bid for the leadership of the Ontario Liberal Party.

=== Sexual orientation ===
Scott's sexual orientation was an open secret during his time in politics, although the media respected his privacy and did not report the fact that he was gay or in a long term same-sex relationship. He came under increasing pressure to come out of the closet, particularly from many of his constituents in St. George—St. David, which includes the Church and Wellesley neighbourhood, home to Canada's largest gay and lesbian community. Although he was asked about his sexual orientation at all candidates meetings during the 1990 provincial election, particularly as Keith Norton, the Tory candidate, was openly gay, Scott declined to comment, saying that it was a private matter.

After his retirement from politics, Scott publicly acknowledged his long-term relationship for the first time in 1993, upon the death of his partner Kim Yakabuski (son of former Progressive Conservative MPP Paul Yakabuski and the brother of current Progressive Conservative MPP John Yakabuski). Scott's obituary for Yakabuski was the first time Scott spoke in public about their relationship.

Scott opposed same-sex marriage for most of his life, on the grounds that it reflected the values of a society which for years treated homosexuals as pariahs. He later expressed regret that his government did not introduce spousal benefits for same-sex couples.

=== Final years ===
In 2001, he published his memoirs, To Make A Difference, co-written with Neil McCormick.

In the 2006 federal Liberal leadership campaign, Scott endorsed Gerard Kennedy. A Toronto Star article on Scott's endorsement also revealed that he remained influential in his last years, lunching regularly with Ontario finance minister Greg Sorbara, health minister George Smitherman and Attorney-General Michael Bryant. Scott still suffered from the effects of his 1994 stroke but "gradually regained the ability to speak" according to the article. Scott was also involved in charity work as chair of the Aphasia Institute, and was also honorary counsel for the Toronto law firm of Paliare Roland lunching with lawyers from the firm once a week. Scott died in his sleep on October 10, 2006, in Toronto.

== Honours ==
The headquarters of the Attorney General of Ontario, the McMurtry-Scott Building, is named in honour of Scott and Roy McMurtry (former AG 1975–1985).

In 2013, the Ian G. Scott Courtroom opened at the University of Ottawa Faculty of Law. It became the first fully-functioning courtroom to operate on a Canadian university campus.

== Sources ==
- Cotter, W. Brent (2016). "Ian Scott: Renaissance Man, Consummate Advocate, Attorney General Extraordinaire". In Woolley, Alice; Dodek, Adam (eds.). In Search of the Ethical Lawyer: Stories from the Canadian Legal Profession. University of British Columbia Press. pp. 202–224. ISBN 978-0-7748-3098-0. OCLC 928679659.
- Scott, Ian; McCormick, Neil (2001). To Make a Difference: A Memoir. Toronto: Stoddart Publishing. ISBN 0-7737-3292-6. OCLC 46627780.

Peterson ministry, Province of Ontario (1985–1990)
Cabinet posts (3)
Predecessor	Office	Successor
Joan Smith	Solicitor General; 1989 (June–August)	Steven Offer
Ken Keyes	Solicitor General; 1986–1987	Ken Keyes
Alan Pope	Attorney General; 1985–1990	Howard Hampton
