= Al Leach =

Canadian politician

Member of the Ontario Provincial Parliament for St. George—St. David
- In office 1995–1999
- Preceded by: Tim Murphy
- Succeeded by: Riding abolished

Personal details
- Born: December 9, 1935 Toronto, Ontario, Canada
- Died: October 19, 2024 (aged 88) Rye, New York, U.S.
- Citizenship: Canadian / American
- Party: Progressive Conservative
- Spouse: Barbara Finegan
- Occupation: Civil Servant

Allan F. Leach (December 9, 1935 – October 18, 2024) was a former transportation executive and politician in Ontario, Canada. In the 1970s, 1980s, and early 1990s, he was the head of GO Transit and later the Toronto Transit Commission. He was a Progressive Conservative member of the Legislative Assembly of Ontario from 1995 to 1999 and a prominent cabinet minister in the government of Mike Harris.

== Early life and career ==
Before he entered politics, Leach spent 23 years in various managerial positions with the Ministry of Transportation of the Government of Ontario. He later moved to GO Transit and was its managing director from 1977 to 1987. He was hired as Chief General Manager of the Toronto Transit Commission in 1987 and served in that position until he resigned in early 1995 to seek political office. Leach was named North American Transit Manager of the year in 1994 by the American Transit Association.

Civic offices
Preceded by Alf Savage	Chief General Manager of the TTC; 1987–1995	Succeeded by David L. Gunn

== Politics ==
Leach was elected to the provincial legislature in the 1995 Ontario election, narrowly defeating Liberal incumbent Tim Murphy and New Democrat Brent Hawkes in the downtown Toronto riding of St. George—St. David. His victory was generally considered an upset. In 1995, the Progressive Conservative Party's electoral strength was concentrated in rural areas and the commuter regions around Toronto. Leach's victory in an urban downtown riding was atypical of his party's showing elsewhere.

Many consider Leach's victory to have been the result of a vote split between the Liberal and NDP candidates since he received less than 34% of the riding's vote and outpolled Murphy by only 337 votes and Hawkes by 963.

Leach was appointed as the Harris government's Minister of Municipal Affairs and Housing on June 26, 1995, and held this position until the 1999 provincial election. In that capacity, Leach presided over a number of controversial issues, including amalgamating the City of Toronto with five of its suburbs, ending rent control, and cutting provincial grants to the metropolitan region. He also presided over market value reassessment for private property in Downtown Toronto.

Former Toronto Mayor John Sewell emerged as a leader of the anti-amalgamation forces in Toronto and threatened to challenge Leach as an independent candidate in the 1999 election. Sewell's participation was believed to help Leach be re-elected by splitting the vote. However, Leach had always stated that he intended to retire from politics at 65, after a single term, which he followed.

=== Cabinet posts ===
Harris ministry, Province of Ontario (1995–2002)
Cabinet post (1)
Predecessor	Office	Successor
Ed Philip (Note: Prior to 1995, the ministry was split between Ed Philip (Municipal Affairs) and Richard Allen (Housing))	Minister of Municipal Affairs and Housing; 1995–1999	Steve Gilchrist

== Later career ==
In 2000 Leach joined the firm of SNC-Lavalin, Canada's largest engineering and construction company and was a member of the board of directors. He also represented SNC-Lavalin on the Hwy 407 Board of Directors.

After the 1999 election, the Harris government appointed Leach to the Toronto Police Services Board and as vice-chair of the GO Transit Board. In December 2003, he resigned from the board. He was not reappointed to the Go Transit Board by the new Liberal Party government.

Leach has also served as a director of the Canadian Urban Transit Association, the American Public Transit Association, the Toronto Police Crime Stoppers, and the United Way Campaign and as a member of the St. Michael's Hospital Governor's Council.

== Personal life ==
In February 2013, Leach moved from Toronto to Rye, New York. He married Barbara Finegan on May 17, 2013. Leach has two children and two granddaughters. Finegan has three sons, one daughter and seven grandchildren. Leach applied for and received a green card and spent the last years of his life as a permanent resident of the United States.

Leach died in October 2024 after living with dementia.
