= Lang Michener =

Canadian law firm

Lang Michener LLP
- Headquarters: Toronto
- No. of offices: 4
- No. of lawyers: 200
- Major practice areas: Full-service
- Date founded: 1926
- Company type: Limited liability partnership
- Dissolved: 2011 (merger)

Lang Michener LLP was a Canadian full-service national law firm, once employing over 200 lawyers with offices in Toronto, Vancouver, Ottawa, and Hong Kong. On January 1, 2011, Lang Michener and McMillan LLP combined, taking the name McMillan LLP.

== History ==
Lang Michener dated back to 1926 in Toronto, Ontario, where future Governor General Roland Michener and Daniel Lang formed the firm as Lang & Michener.

By 1986 the firm, then formally known as Lang, Michener, Cranston, Farquharson & Wright, and numbering 82 lawyers, merged with the 27-lawyer Toronto firm Lash, Johnston, Sheard and Pringle, to form Lang Michener Lash Johnston.

In 1989, the firm merged with the Vancouver, British Columbia, firm of Lawrence & Shaw, that coincidentally had also been formed in 1926, by partners James Lyle Lawrence and Alistair Shaw. The firm became Lang Michener Lawrence & Shaw. It was later renamed Lang Michener LLP.

The first Lang & Michener office was in the Canadian National Building at 347 Bay Street. It was one of the first Bay Street law firms in Canada.

The firm played a leading role in Canada's political and legal landscape. Founding partner Roland Michener was appointed Speaker of the House of Commons by Prime Minister John Diefenbaker and later Governor General of Canada by Prime Minister Lester B. Pearson. Daniel Aiken Lang, son of firm founder Daniel Webster Lang, was appointed to the Canadian Senate also by Prime Minister Lester B. Pearson. The Right Honourable Jean Chrétien practiced with Lang Michener from 1986 to 1990, and Michel Bastarache, of the Ottawa office, was appointed a Justice of the Supreme Court of Canada in 1997.

In later years, the firm's reputation as a leading Bay Street law firm had faded. In 2010, the firm ranked as the 22nd largest law firm in the country. The firm elected to merge with McMillan LLP in November 2010. Observers saw the merger as a sign of the difficult legal economy and an opportunity for the two firms to regain their lost clout. After the merger, the new McMillan became the 12th largest firm in Canada.
