= Joanne Campbell (politician) =

Canadian politician (born 1948)

Toronto City Councillor for Ward 7
- In office 1982–1985 Serving with David Reville
- Preceded by: Gordon Cressy
- Succeeded by: Barbara Hall

Metro Toronto Councillor for Ward 7
- In office 1982 – September 1987
- Preceded by: Gordon Cressy
- Succeeded by: Roger Hollander

Personal details
- Born: March 25, 1948 (age 78) Montreal, Quebec
- Party: New Democratic Party
- Spouse: Gordon Cressy (m. 1983)
- Children: Joe Cressy (son)

Joanne Campbell (born March 25, 1948) is a former Canadian politician, who served on Toronto City Council from 1982 to 1985 and on Metro Toronto Council from 1982 to 1988.

== Background ==
Campbell was born in Montreal and raised in the nearby suburb of Hudson, where she was a childhood friend of her future Toronto City Council colleague Jack Layton.

Prior to her election to council, Campbell worked in the office of councillor Gordon Cressy as an executive assistant. After Cressy announced that he would not run for reelection in the 1982 municipal election, Campbell and Barbara Hall competed for the Metro New Democratic Party endorsement to be its second candidate alongside David Reville in the Ward 7 race. Campbell won the endorsement. In the official election campaign, the strategy was that Reville was campaigning as the "senior alderman" candidate, who would receive more votes and thereby serve simultaneously as the ward's representative to Metro Toronto Council, while Campbell was the "junior" candidate who would serve only on the city council. On election day, however, although both won the election it was Campbell, not Reville, who finished with the higher vote total and became the "senior" alderman.

Campbell later married Cressy in 1983.

== City council ==
Early in her term in office, Campbell chaired a task force on housing for low income singles in Metro Toronto, which resulted in eligibility for subsidized housing for single people in Ontario, and collaborated with June Rowlands to lobby for improved childcare services in the city. Campbell and other NDP-affiliated city councillors — including Reville, Layton, Richard Gilbert, Dorothy Thomas and Joe Pantalone — also collaborated on a job creation plan at the height of the early 1980s recession.

Campbell also served as the city's representative to the board of the Toronto Humane Society.

In June 1984, Campbell's first son with Cressy, Joseph, was born. Campbell was the first woman ever to give birth to a child while serving as a member of Toronto's city council.

In November 1984, the city was embroiled in a controversy around a condominium development proposal, which would have seen three apartment buildings on Eglinton Avenue demolished, while the city was blocking the developer's application because it represented a significant loss to the city's supply of affordable housing. Although the developer sought and won an Ontario Superior Court decision ordering the city to issue the demolition permits, Campbell was one of 11 councillors, alongside Gilbert, Pantalone, Layton, Reville, Thomas, Rowlands, Dale Martin, Anne Johnston, Ron Kanter and Chris Korwin-Kuczynski, who walked out of council chambers to prevent the meeting from attaining quorum.

== Metro council ==
The structure of Toronto's municipal government was revised in 1985. Under the new system, instead of the Metro Council seat going automatically to whichever city councillor had won more votes in the election, one person would be directly elected as a Metro councillor while the other would be elected as a city alderman. Although the Metro councillor would still sit on the city council, the change was accompanied with other structural changes to boost the power of the city aldermen, who had often seen their power and authority diminished by the perception that they were "junior" to the Metro councillors. In the 1985 municipal election, Campbell ran for and won re-election to the Metro seat, while Hall became the ward's city alderman.

Soon after the election, Campbell left the NDP bloc on council to affiliate with a new "moderate" bloc, whose other members included Rowlands, Kanter, Korwin-Kuczynski, Betty Disero, Kay Gardner and Nadine Nowlan. She continued to identify as a New Democrat politically, stating that she had chosen to leave the NDP group not because of any change in her basic ideology, but because she no longer had faith in the value of trying to create a political party structure at Toronto City Hall, and felt that the NDP caucus was missing opportunities to advance its policy goals by collaborating across party lines.

She won election to one of the city's seats on Metro Council's executive committee, defeating Derwyn Shea by one vote despite Shea having the backing of mayor Art Eggleton. She became chair of Metro Council's community services committee. In this role, she continued to champion issues such as housing and daycare, and joined with Rowlands in a filibuster against a bill that would have allowed condominium conversion of existing rental housing units. She also worked to improve relations between the Toronto Police Service and the community, most notably by helping to establish an advisory committee on community-police relations in the economically disadvantaged Regent Park neighbourhood in her ward.

In 1986, Campbell was one of the councillors who spearheaded a push to have the post of "alderman" renamed to a gender-neutral title. She was also a strong proponent of a policy, which was successfully passed in 1987, to protect municipal employees from discrimination or harassment on the basis of HIV status.

During her second council term, both the Ontario Liberal Party and the Ontario Progressive Conservative Party courted Campbell as a candidate, but she refused because her ideological affiliations remained with the New Democrats.

== Post-political life ==
Campbell announced in 1987 that she was resigning her seat to accept an appointment to chair the provincial Social Assistance Review Board. Gilbert was selected to replace Campbell as the city's representative on Metro Council's executive committee, and Roger Hollander won a by-election on October 9, 1987 to succeed her in Ward 7.

After her term on the Social Assistance Review Board ended, Campbell was appointed as General Manager of the Metro Toronto Housing Company Ltd., Metro Toronto’s 20,000 unit social housing entity. At the time of the creation of the amalgamated City of Toronto she was appointed as General Manager of the Shelter, Housing and Support Division. She retired from this role in 1999.

In 2000 she joined the Centre for Addiction and Mental Health as vice-president of community relations and communications, leaving this role in 2007 to work with Cressy on an international development project to build a YMCA, including Tobago’s first public swimming pool in Trinidad and Tobago.

After the project was completed, the duo returned to Toronto, where Cressy accepted a fundraising position with George Brown College and Campbell attended the institution as a student in its chef training program. Their son Joe was elected to Toronto City Council in the 2014 municipal election.
