= McMillan LLP =

Canadian law firm

- Company type: Limited liability partnership
- Industry: Law
- Founded: Toronto (1903)
- Headquarters: Vancouver, Calgary, Toronto, Ottawa, Montreal
- Products: Legal advice, Advocacy
- Number of employees: 1000+
- Website: mcmillan.ca

McMillan LLP is a Canadian business law firm serving public, private and not-for-profit clients across various industries in North America and around the world. It has offices in Canada's major centres – Vancouver, Calgary, Toronto, Ottawa and Montreal.

== Founding firms ==
The firm was founded by Newton Rowell in 1903. At this time, it consisted of three lawyers and was called Rowell, Reid and Wood. By 1910, the firm had more than doubled in size to seven lawyers, which it maintained until the mid-twenties. Gordon McMillan joined the firm in 1921 and practiced for over half of a century, bringing notable clients such as Monarch and BorgWarner.

In 1926, Rhodes Scholar Roland Michener and Osgoode Hall graduate Daniel Lang formed Lang Michener, another firm that would later merge with McMillan LLP. That same year, partners James Lyle Lawrence and Alistair Shaw formed Lawrence & Shaw in Vancouver, British Columbia.

Rowell accepted the appointment as Chief Justice of Ontario in 1936. After his departure, McMillan worked with junior partner Bill Binch to build and expand the firm. By 1945, it was called McMillan, Binch, Wilkinson and Berry.

Throughout the 1940s and 1950s, Binch would drive from Toronto throughout the mid-west and Chicago to solicit work from mid-sized U.S. companies looking to expand into Canada. His pioneering work opened a north–south corridor between McMillan Binch and American businesses that, at the time, belied the trend in many Canadian firms to patch together national networks running east–west.

== Mergers ==
In 1989, Lang Michener merged with Lawrence & Shaw, becoming Lang Michener Lawrence & Shaw. Jean Chrétien practised with Lang Michener from 1986 to 1990. A former partner, Michel Bastarache was appointed a justice of the Supreme Court of Canada in 1997.

In 2005, McMillan Binch LLP in Toronto and Mendelsohn LLP in Montreal combined to form McMillan Binch Mendelsohn LLP.

A few years later in 2009, McMillan LLP and Thackray Burgess joined forces to found McMillan's third office, based in Calgary.

In January 2011, McMillan LLP and Lang Michener LLP announced a merger, and began operating under McMillan LLP.
