= William Dennison (Canadian politician) =

Canadian politician

William (Bill) Donald Dennison
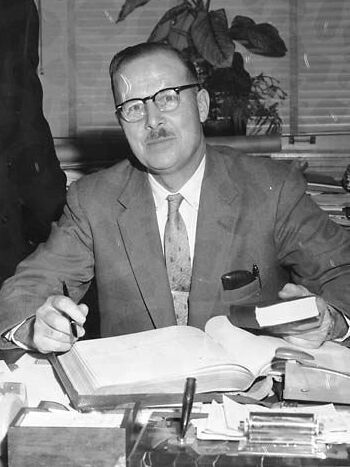
- Dennison, c. 1959

55th Mayor of Toronto
- In office 1 January 1967 – 31 December 1972
- Preceded by: Philip Givens
- Succeeded by: David Crombie

Member of Provincial Parliament
- In office 1948–1951
- Preceded by: Roland Michener
- Succeeded by: Everett Weaver
- Constituency: St. David
- In office 1943–1945
- Preceded by: Allan Lamport
- Succeeded by: Roland Michener
- Constituency: St. David

Toronto Ward 2 (Cabbagetown & Rosedale) Alderman
- In office 1941-1943, 1953-1958

Toronto Board of Control
- In office 1959-1966

Personal details
- Born: 20 January 1905 Renfrew County, Ontario, Canada
- Died: 2 May 1981 (aged 76) Toronto, Ontario, Canada
- Party: Co-operative Commonwealth Federation
- Other political affiliations: United Farmers of Ontario, New Democratic Party of Canada
- Spouse: Dorothy Gertrude Bainbridge
- Children: Lorna Milne
- Education: Westmeath S.S. # 8
- Occupation: School Principal

William Donald Dennison (20 January 1905 – 2 May 1981) was a Canadian politician who served as the 55th mayor of Toronto from 1967 to 1972. Dennison was first elected as an alderman on Toronto City Council in 1941. A member of the Co-operative Commonwealth Federation (CCF), he was elected to be the member of Provincial Parliament (MPP) for St. David from 1943 to 1945 and 1948 to 1951. He returned to municipal politics in 1953, serving as an alderman until 1958 when he was elected to the Toronto Board of Control. Dennison ran for mayor in the 1966 municipal election, defeating Phil Givens, the incumbent. Prior to entering politics, he was a school principal and teacher. As of 2022, he was the last mayor of Toronto to be a member of the Orange Order.

== Background ==
Dennison grew up on a farm in Renfrew County. He first left home at age 15 to work in the lumber camps of Northern Ontario. As a young man, he would trek west to Saskatchewan in the summers to earn money helping with the harvest and pitching grain. By night, he would educate himself by reading Little Blue Books.

As a child and a young man he stammered to the point where he struggled to pronounce his name, although after several attempts to manage his stammering, first at a school in Kitchener and later at a school in New York City, he learned how to control it himself, opening his own School of Speech Correction.

== Politics ==
=== UFO/CCF ===
Dennison was a member of the United Farmers of Ontario in the 1920s, and became a member of the Co-operative Commonwealth Federation and its successor, the New Democratic Party. He was the CCF candidate in the Rosedale electoral district during the 1935 federal election: he placed third.

He won a seat in the 1943 provincial election as the Ontario CCF Member of Provincial Parliament (MPP) representing St. David electoral district in downtown Toronto. He defeated Progressive Conservative candidate Roland Michener, a future Governor General of Canada. In the legislature, Dennison was an early environmentalist. As an early conservationist, in the 1940s, he tried to stop the de Havilland aircraft factory from polluting Black Creek. He also tried to force the government to stop a pulp and paper mill from polluting the Spanish River. In 1946 he personally planted 40,000 trees. Michener defeated Dennison in the 1945 provincial election, but Dennison regained the seat in the 1948 election. Dennison lost his seat for the last time during the Conservative sweep that left the Ontario CCF with only two seats in the 1951 provincial election.

=== City of Toronto ===
In 1938, he was elected a school trustee and served three successive one-year terms. In 1941 and 1943 he won election to serve as an alderman on Toronto City Council for Ward 2 (Cabbagetown and Rosedale) After a ten-year interlude with his involvement in provincial politics, Dennison returned to Toronto City Council in 1953 serving again as an alderman for Ward 2. In 1958, he was elected to the Toronto Board of Control. On council he interrogated other politicians and officials on conflict of interest, expense accounts, and their relationships with companies doing business with the city. He ran to be Toronto's mayor in 1966, campaigning on providing "a strong voice for labour in city affairs" and opposing the pro-development policies of incumbent Philip Givens. He was elected despite being opposed by all three daily newspapers. He was the first member of the CCF or NDP to serve as mayor of Toronto since James Simpson in 1935, and the last until Barbara Hall.

He opposed the early Eaton Centre development plan that would have seen the demolition of Toronto's Old City Hall, Dennison was a pro-labour mayor but later became more conservative in response to early criticism. Serving as mayor during the Canadian Centennial, he urged the organizers of Caribana to make it a recurring event.

He generally favoured development and complained about hippies and deserters from the US military flocking to the city, saying that "a few hippies and deserters are Toronto's only problem." He decided not to run again for mayor, and due to a prostate operation, watched the 1972 municipal election from a bed at St. Michael's Hospital.

== Retirement and death ==
Dennison and his wife Dorothy (née Bainbridge) had a Christmas tree farm in Caledon East, where they went to get away from the city. He was also a beekeeper, and at one point, had 900,000 bees living in his Jarvis Street home's backyard. During his retirement, the Dennisons would vacation in Florida during the winter months. While vacationing in the United States, a medical emergency arose due to his Parkinson's disease, and it finally forced him to be evacuated back to Toronto in April 1981. He died at Toronto General Hospital from complications due to Parkinson's Disease on 2 May 1981. Their only child, Lorna Dennison Milne, was a community activist who was appointed to the Senate of Canada, sitting in the Red Chamber as a Liberal from 1995 to 2009.
