= Architecture of Vancouver =

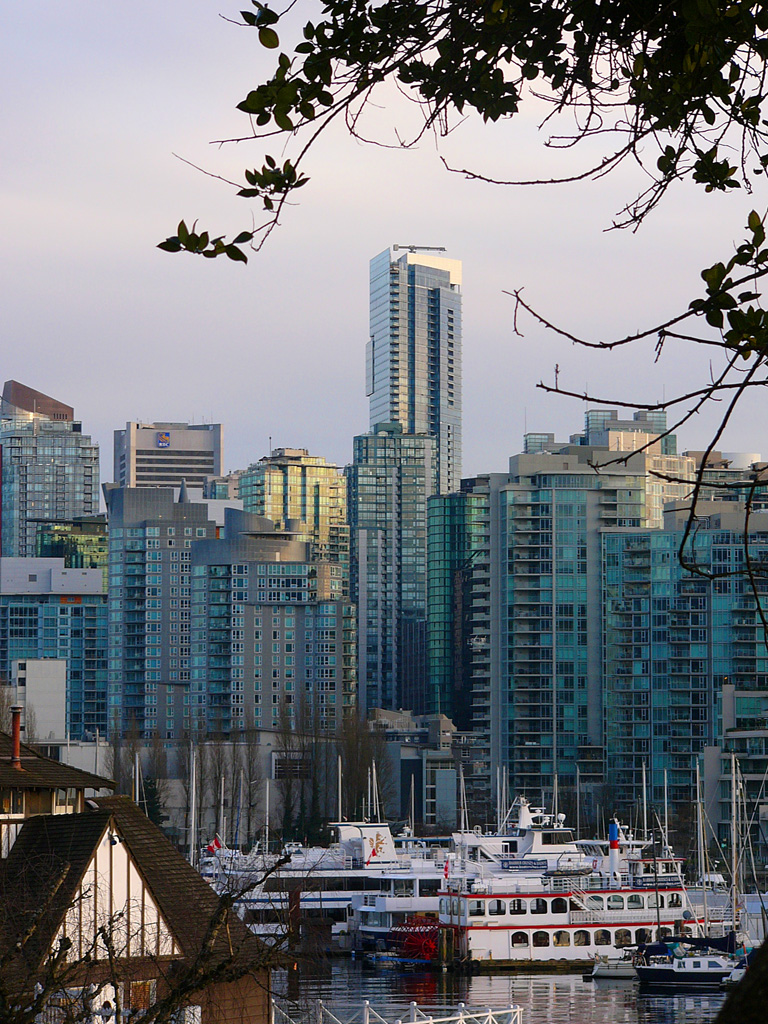
Vancouver is sometimes referred to as the "City of Glass" because of the glass aesthetics that dominate downtown.

The architecture of Vancouver and the Greater Vancouver area consists of a variety of modern architectural styles, such as the 20th-century Edwardian and the 21st-century modernist styles. Initially, the city architects embraced styles developed in Europe and the United States, with only limited local variation.

In the years following World War II, regional variations of modernism began to emerge, later known as the "West Coast style". Building constraints in the area led to design focused on the natural landscape and feasible construction. This led to the development of design that uses complex geometric forms, open-plan layouts, and natural light through the extensive use of glass. The predominance of glass in many high rises in Downtown Vancouver has led to the city's moniker "City of Glass" and "See Through City".

In the 20th century, the Vancouver Special residential style was developed in the city. Architectural styles found throughout the American Pacific Coast – such as the American Craftsman, California bungalow, and dingbat – are common in Vancouver.

== Natural environment ==
Vancouver's cityscape and architecture have developed in response to its temperate, scenic, and readily accessible natural setting of ocean, forests, and mountains. The downtown core is built on a peninsula surrounded on three sides by readily accessible waterfront beaches, parks, and walkways. The Financial District is located downtown, but many office buildings have emerged in suburban town centres, resulting in the downtown having a high percentage of residential buildings, restaurants, and retail outlets. The region is in an active seismic zone, and seismic bracing is a significant part of both new construction and retrofitting.

A noticeable feature of Vancouver's strong connection to nature is the Seawall, a man-made, car-free pathway which stretches around the downtown peninsula along the waterfront. It provides a direct link to the water's edge from Downtown and Stanley Park, as well as residential areas of the West End, False Creek, Vanier Park, and Kits Beach. Stanley Park itself is an 800-acre microcosm of coastal British Columbia rainforest, all within direct sight and easy walking distance from the central business district. The pedestrian-only Seabus gives riders a quick transit connection between downtown and the North Shore, while smaller private ferry operators (False Creek Ferries and The Aquabus) crisscross False Creek linking residential, cultural, and recreational venues.

=== West Coast Style ===
The West Coast Style (also known as West Coast Modernism or West Coast Vernacular) is an architectural style that first emerged in the Greater Vancouver area, seeking to incorporate the natural environment into the design of buildings. This regional variation of modernism emerged in the 1940s and continued to be a major influence in residential design for the next three decades. The designs emerging from west coast architects were recognized by the Royal Architectural Institute of Canada in 1947 as a frontier in modern architecture. "In the domestic field (west coast architects) have proved to their clients present and future, by outward and inward visible signs, that the modern house is the only house for a modern family in British Columbia. Nowhere else in Canada has that proof been given."

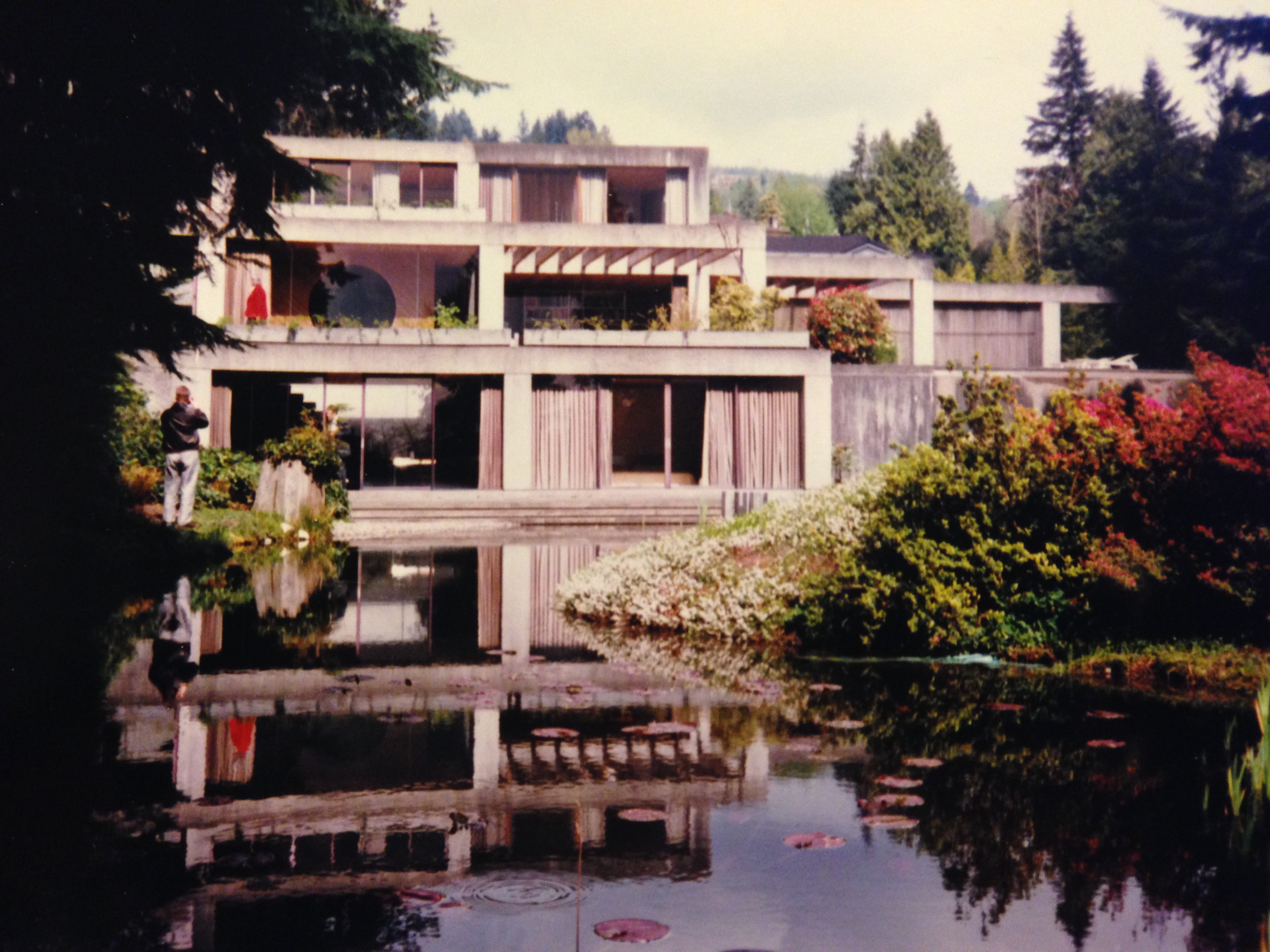
Helmut Eppich house, located in West Vancouver, was designed by Arthur Erickson Architects in the West Coast style. A style popular throughout Greater Vancouver, it utilizes the environment as part of the design.

Arthur Erickson, Fred Hollingsworth, Ned Pratt, and artist B. C. Binning are notable pioneers of the modern movement on the west coast, a loosely associated group that Erickson named "The Vancouver School." Major stylistic influences were the International Style, open space plans of Japanese architecture, the work of Frank Lloyd Wright, and the work and talk given in Vancouver by Richard Neutra. The houses were often modest in scale and in budget.

In the 1949 'Design for Living' exhibition, Pratt cited five specific local characteristics that determined the form of the emerging style:

- Rainfall: Generous roof overhangs, flat roofs, large overhangs on the south facade to control the summer sun while allowing for passive solar heating in winter, indicating an early awareness of energy conservation.
- Sunshine: Extensive use of glazing was a fundamental feature, allowing the visual integration of the house into its surrounding landscape. Glass windows were beaded into structural wood members. The amount of glass was not necessarily increased but, was concentrated into wide areas facing the view and light.
- View and Aspect: the often-substantial views were maximized with large windows and building orientation.
- Exterior Treatment: Preferred exterior wall finish was unpainted or clear-finished wood, often used on both interior and exterior walls at large glass walls to blur the distinction between inside and outside.

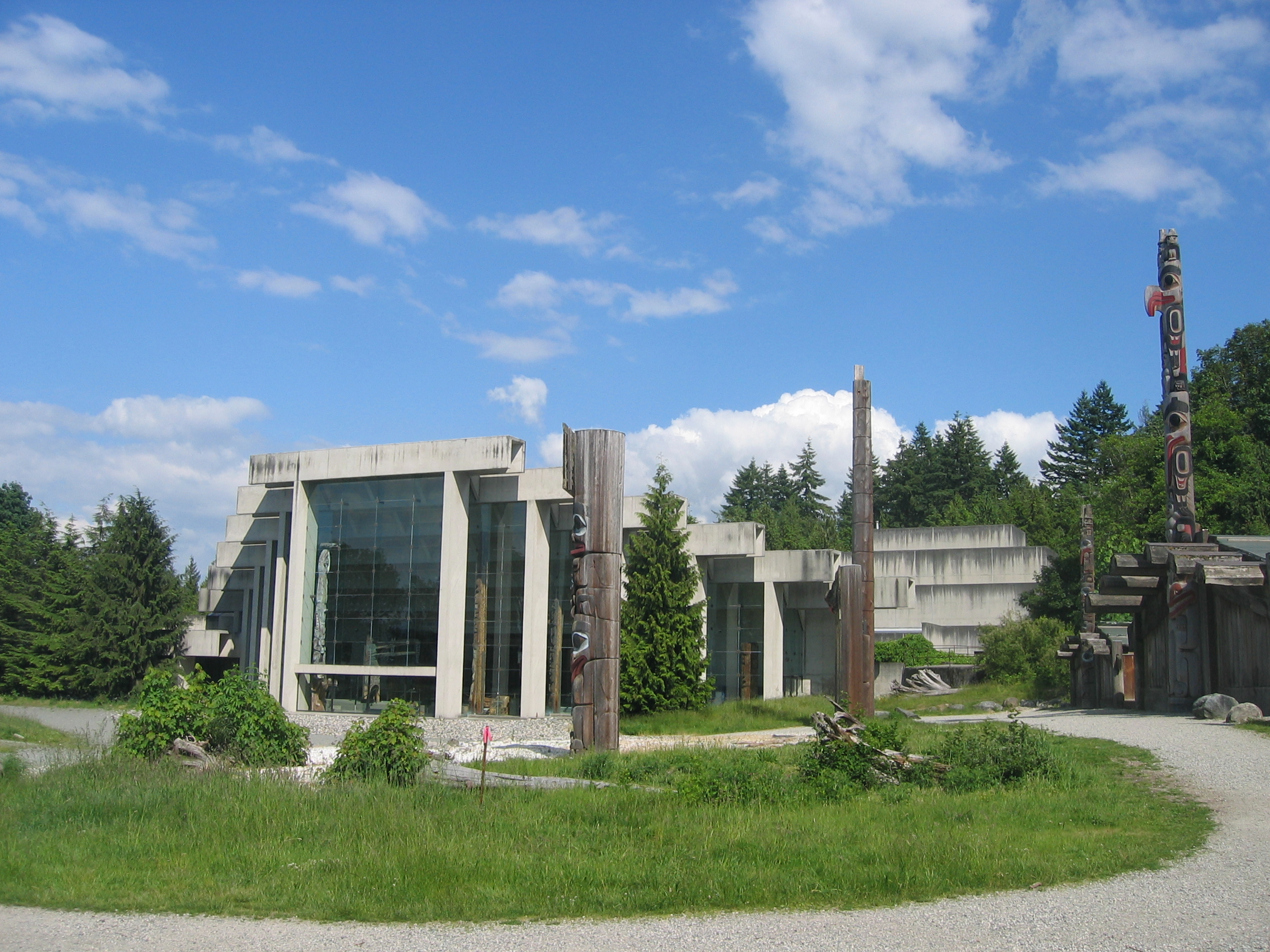
UBC Museum of Anthropology was designed by Arthur Erickson. Erickson drew inspiration from the post and beam architecture of the Northwest coast First Nations.

- Plan: Open floor plans, minimal use of interior partitions, often with custom-designed built-in furniture providing uniformity of styles, and movable cupboards to allow them to act as movable screens were key features.

Key themes of this style have been described as: "Don't fight nature, use it to your advantage;""responding directly to the site" "post-and-beam construction with sleek lines that showcased North and West Vancouver's rugged natural setting;" "extensive, monumental use of glass," "rooms where inside and outside dissolve;" include the natural environment as part of the design;" and "the buildings are terraced remain in harmony with the contours of the landscape."

The natural materials of the region were indicative of the style: wood (in particular Douglas fir and western redcedar), stone, plywood, wood-stud and post and beam construction with exposed roof decking underside of roofs at ceilings and eaves. Connection of the interior to outdoor environment was continued in commercial developments such as the landscaped terraces atop government offices in Robson Square, the glass-roofed Law Courts, the planter-infused Evergreen Building, vine-covered Chan Centre for the Performing Arts, and the UBC Museum of Anthropology. Sidewalks along many shopping streets are covered with glass canopies, providing shelter from the rain but not blocking daylight. Later designs of high-rise residential towers followed this lead with large glass walls.

== 19th century ==
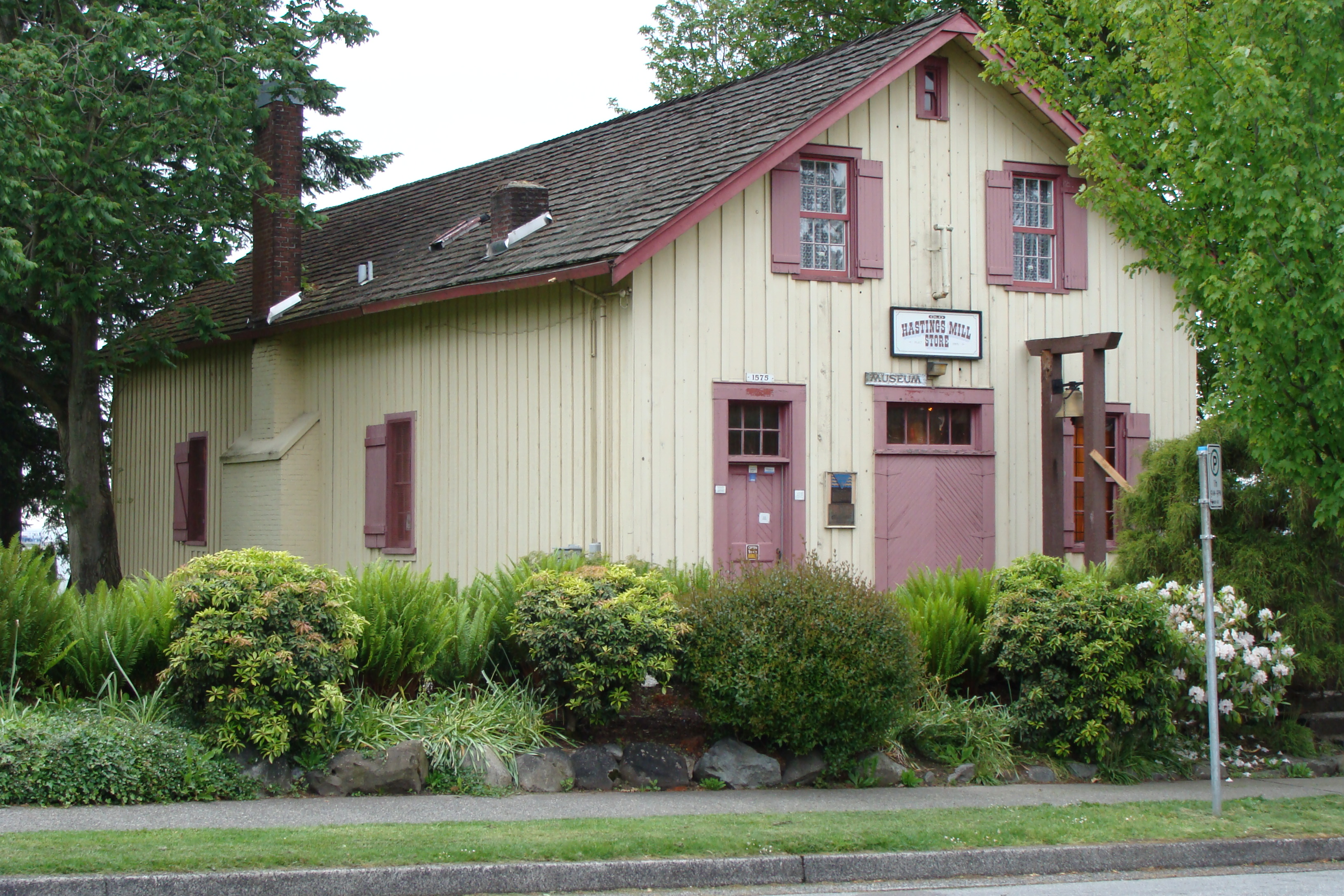
Built in 1865, Hastings Mill Store is the oldest building in Vancouver.

First Nations peoples had inhabited the region of Greater Vancouver for an estimated 3.000 years when the first European ships visited in 1791. When settlers arrived in the early 1800s, there were several communities of Squamish and Sto:lo peoples. Their buildings were primarily wooden longhouses, such as one in X̱wáýx̱way (now Stanley Park) that reportedly measured approximately 60 meters long, 20 meters wide, and housed 100 people. Only replicas of these structures remain in museums and on Indian reserves in the region.

The earliest European settlement was the Hudson's Bay Company outpost at Fort Langley, established in 1827 on the Fraser River approximately 32 km (30 miles) east of present-day downtown Vancouver. Examples of the first settlement can be seen at Fort Langley National Historic Site. New Westminster became the region's major centre in the 1850s but most of the city was destroyed by fire in 1898.

Within what is now the City of Vancouver, the first European settlement was founded in the early 1860s, and the first townsite established was called "Granville" in what later became known as Gastown. The settlement was selected as the terminus of the Canadian Pacific Railway, and in 1886 was established as the City of Vancouver - three months later the Great Vancouver Fire destroyed nearly all of the buildings. Only the Hastings Mill store survives as a museum.

Few examples of 19th-century architecture remain. One notable example is Christ Church Cathedral, which opened downtown in 1894.

== Early 20th century ==
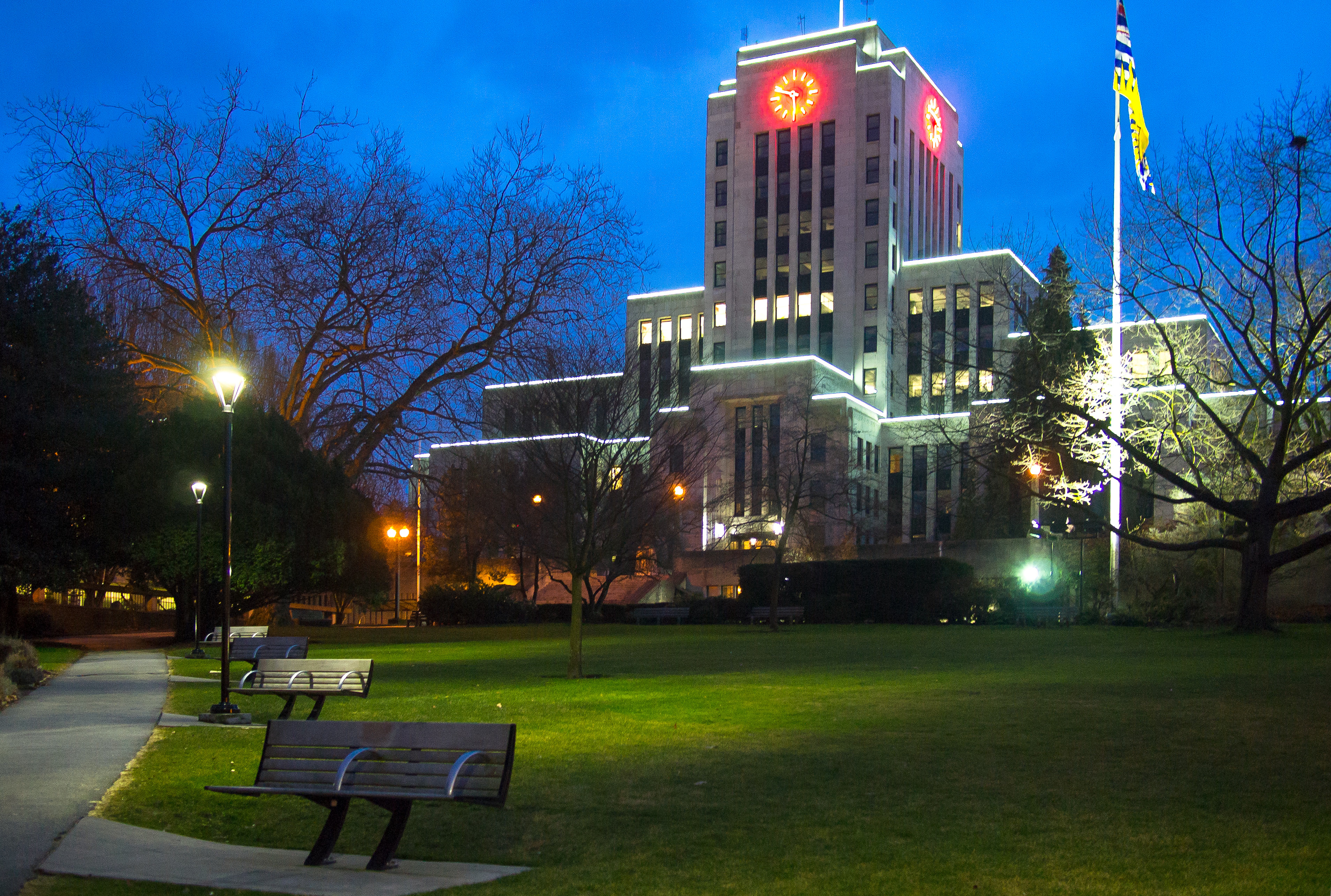
An example of Art Deco style, Vancouver City Hall was completed in 1936.

A collection of Edwardian buildings in the old downtown core were once the tallest commercial buildings in the British Empire. These were, in succession, the Carter-Cotton Building (former home of The Vancouver Province newspaper), the Dominion Building (1907) and the Sun Tower (1911), and the elaborate Art Deco Marine Building (1930). The latter is known for its elaborate ceramic tile facings and brass-gilt doors and elevators, which have made it a favourite location for movie shoots.

Other notable buildings and structures from this era include:

- Carnegie Community Centre (former Carnegie Library)
- British Columbia Penitentiary cell blocks, New Westminster, 1904-1914.
- British Columbia Courthouse (now home to the Vancouver Art Gallery), 1906, designed by Francis Rattenbury.
- Hotel Europe, 1909, a prominent flatiron-style building in Gastown.
- St. Paul's Hospital Burrard wing, 1913, Renaissance Revival style.
- Pacific Central Station, 1919, the former Canadian Northern Pacific, and later CN Railway station, now used by Via Rail Canada and Amtrak.
- Waterfront Station, 1914, the former west coast terminus of the Canadian Pacific Railway, now serving the Skytrain and Seabus.
- Second Narrows Bridge, 1925.
- The Orpheum, 1927, former vaudeville house and now a civic theatre.
- Burrard Bridge, 1930–32, a five-lane, Art Deco style, steel truss bridge over False Creek.
- Vancouver City Hall, Art Deco style, 1936.
- Lions Gate Bridge, 1937, a three-lane suspension bridge over Burrard Inlet between Stanley Park and North Vancouver.
- Hotel Vancouver, one of Canada's grand railway hotels with a distinct green copper roof, opened in 1939 (the third by that name).
- University of British Columbia West Point Grey campus and early buildings, 1925-1930s.

== Mid-20th century ==
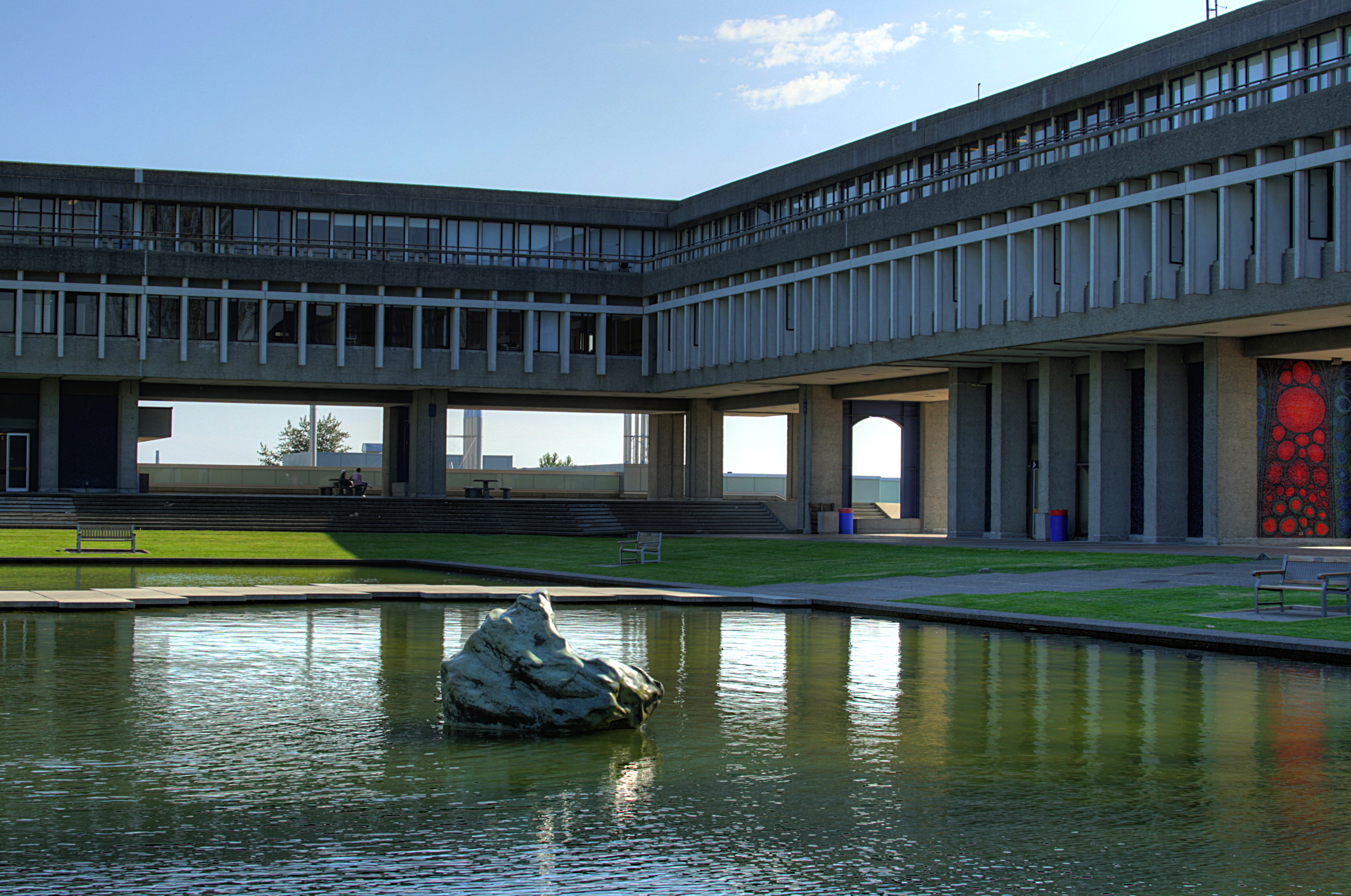
Completed in 1967, the Academic Quadrangle of Simon Fraser University was designed by Arthur Erickson and Geoffrey Massey in a brutalist style.

Notable buildings and structures from this era include:

- Vancouver General Hospital, Centennial Pavilion, 1959.
- Harbour Centre, 1977, WZMH Architects, with its distinctive revolving restaurant on top.
- The Electra, originally the BC Electric and later BC Hydro headquarters, a modernist high-rise designed by Ron Thom and Ned Pratt, converted to condominia in the 1990s.
- MacMillan Bloedel Building, 1965, Erickson/Massey Architects, a distinctively tapered tower with exposed concrete facade.
- Pacific National Exhibition buildings grounds in east Vancouver, including Pacific Coliseum and Empire Stadium (demolished).
- Ironworkers Memorial Second Narrows Crossing, 1960.
- Simon Fraser University, 1964–present, atop Burnaby Mountain, campus plan and select buildings by Erickson & Massey, other buildings and major expansions by others.
- Queen Elizabeth Theatre and Vancouver Playhouse, 1959; Affleck, Desbarats, Dimakopoulos, Lebensold, Sise (architects)
- HR MacMillan Space Centre and Vancouver Museum building, 1967, Gerald Hamilton Architect; renovation and expansion by others 1996-98.
- Bloedel Conservatory
- UBC Museum of Anthropology, 1976, Arthur Erickson Architects
- Robson Square, 1979, Arthur Erickson Architects
- Law Courts (Vancouver), 1980, Arthur Erickson Architects

== Late 20th and early 21st Century ==
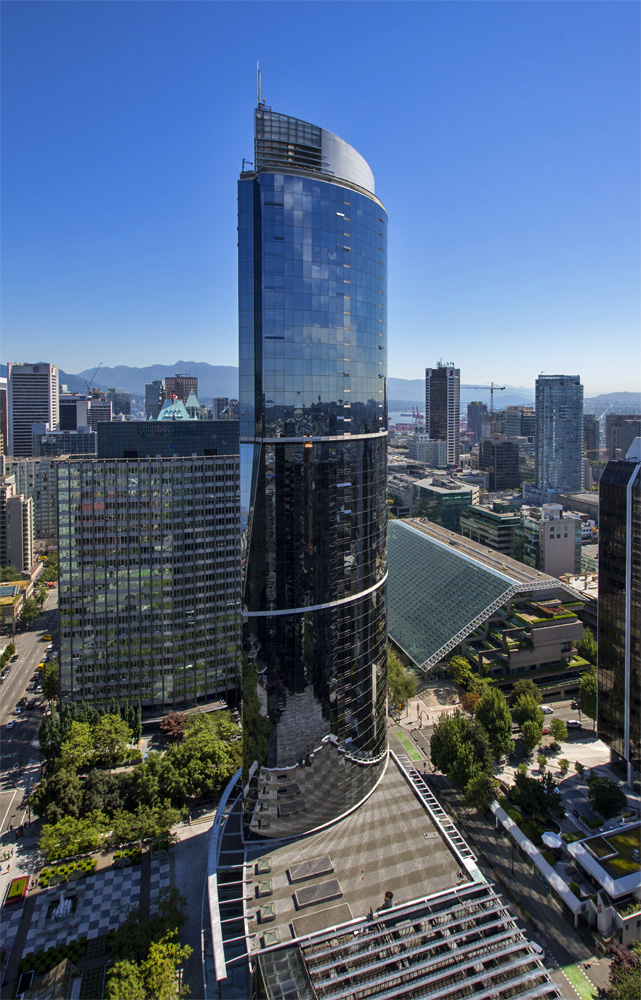
Designed by Perkins and Will in a modernist style, the One Wall Centre was completed in 2001 as a hotel and residential tower. The sloping facade behind it is the Law Courts.

Vancouver's reputation as the City of Glass began to emerge during this period. The temperate climate with less-harsh sun makes having large walls of non-heat and sun-reflecting glass feasible. The rain is an impetus for pedestrian shelter, but not shade, which has led to extensive use of glass canopies over sidewalks along pedestrian shopping streets.

Insertions of urban outdoor spaces include the Dr. Sun Yat-Sen Classical Chinese Garden and the landscaped terraces atop the Erickson-designed Robson Square complex. An early 1970s provincial government plan to erect the British Columbia Centre (at 682 feet it would still be the tallest building in the city as of 2013) was revised to become Erickson's 3-block complex comprising Robson Square, the glass and spaceframe roofed Law Courts, and the transformation of the old courthouse into the Vancouver Art Gallery.

The 2010 Olympic Games spurred new construction and revitalization of sporting venues and support facilities, including the Athletes Village, throughout the Greater Vancouver region and Whistler.

Examples of late-20th-century and early-21st-century architecture include:

- Emily Carr University of Art and Design, Granville Island Campus, South Building; Patkau Architects, 1994
- Vancouver Library Square, 1993-1995, Moshe Safdie and DA Architects, reminiscent of the Colosseum in Rome.
- Vancouver International Airport
- Rogers Arena
- BC Cancer Research Centre
- Chan Centre for the Performing Arts
- Vancouver Convention Centre - DA Architects, MCM and LMN
- Living Shangri-La
- One Wall Centre
- Audain Art Museum
- Woodward's Building
- Telus Garden

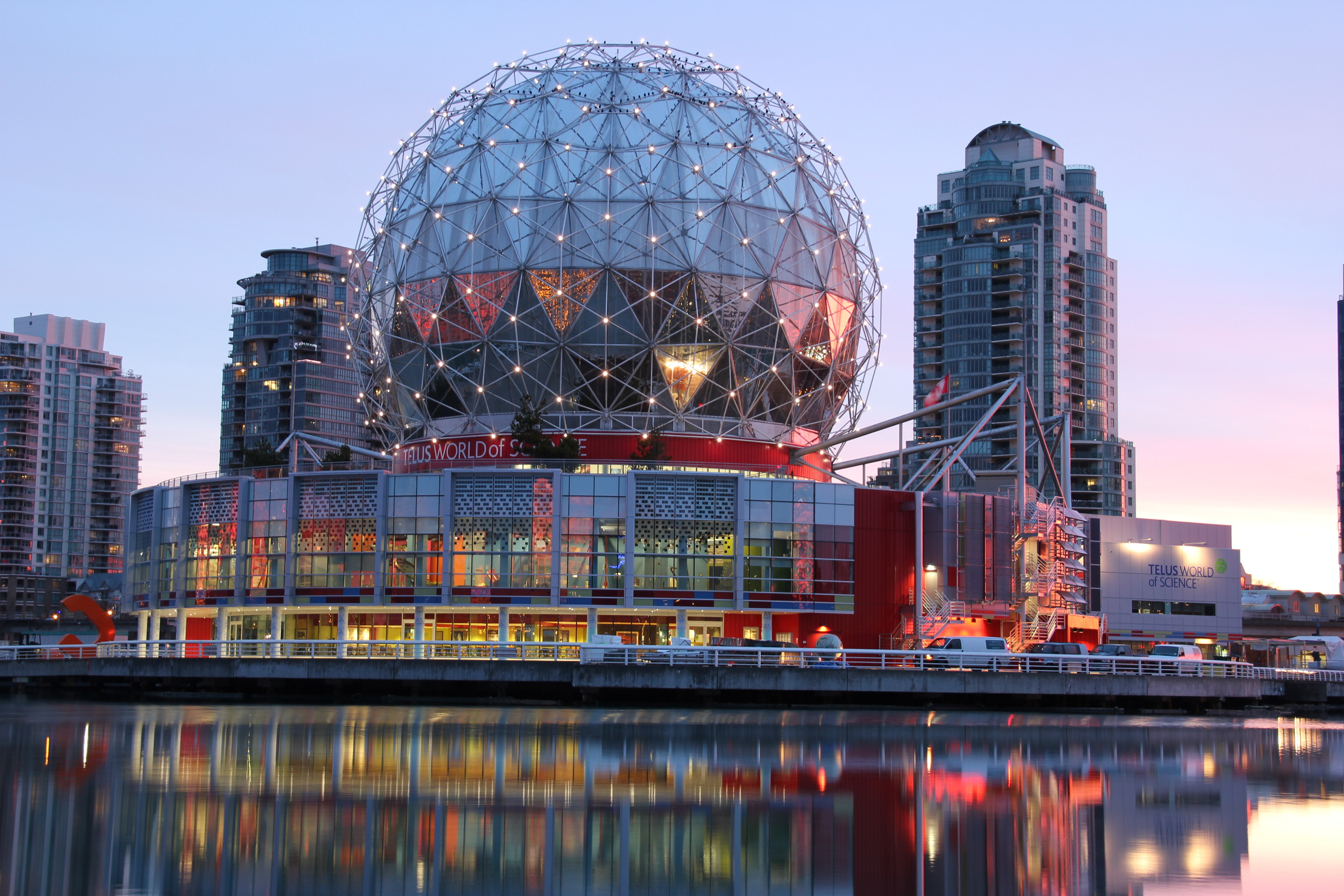
Built as the main centre for Expo 86, an intensive lobbying campaign after the fair would see the centre be maintained as Science World.

=== Expo 86 ===
The Expo 86 World Exposition that was hosted on former railway and industrial lands along the north shore of False Creek and a maritime pier in the harbour left a lasting legacy on the city form and architecture in Vancouver. In addition to the many temporary structures erected for the duration of the fair, the rapid city growth that followed, and the massive redevelopment on what became known as Concord Pacific Place, several buildings developed for the fair remain as urban landmarks: BC Place, the once inflatable and now cable-suspended roofed stadium; Canada Place, the prominent tent-roof structure that housed the Canada and CN Pavilions and is now the East Building of the Vancouver Convention Centre, the Pan-Pacific Hotel, and a cruise ship terminal; and Science World, a public educational and entertainment venue at the east end of False Creek.

=== Leaky condo crisis ===
A major impact on buildings in the region since the early 1990s has been an ongoing construction, financial, and legal crisis known as the Leaky Condo Crisis. It first emerged in residential buildings in the Greater Vancouver region during a major construction boom. It primarily involves multi-unit condominium (or strata) buildings damaged by rainwater infiltration, causing in B.C. alone an estimated $4 billion in damage to over 900 buildings and 31.000 individual housing units built between the late 1980s and early 2000s, establishing it as the most extensive and most costly reconstruction of housing stock in Canadian history. Similar infiltration problems have been reported in high-rise buildings and schools. Since the start of the crisis, it has been commonplace to see occupied buildings draped in scaffolding and protective tarps, sometimes referred to as "B.C. Flags," as the problems were assessed and repaired.

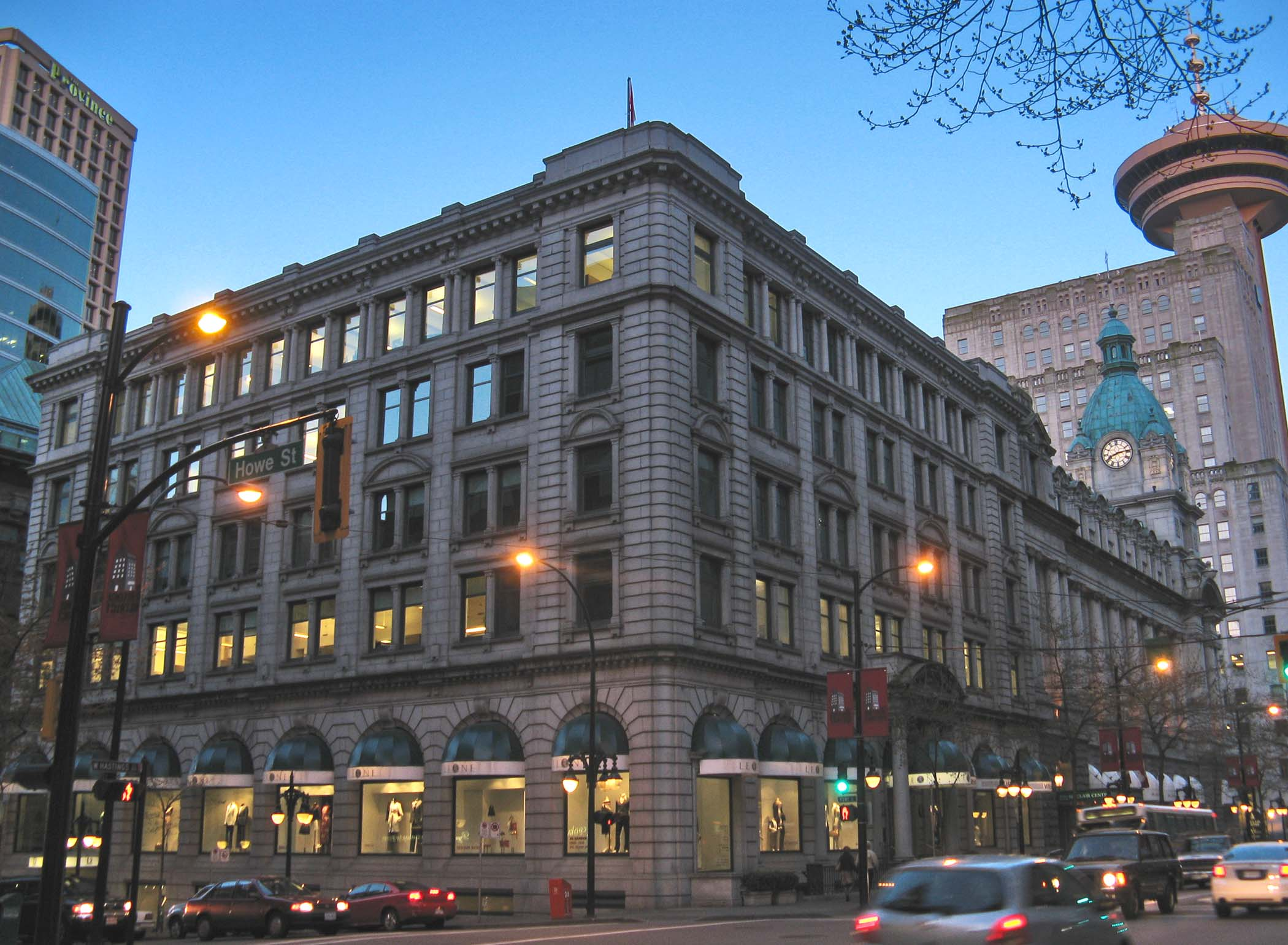
Renovated in 1986, the Sinclair Centre comprises four early 20th century buildings that were restored as an upscale shopping complex.

=== Heritage buildings and adaptive re-use ===
In the 1960s, a movement emerged to preserve Gastown's distinctive and historic architecture in the face of plans to demolish it, along with nearby Chinatown, Japantown, and Strathcona, to build a major freeway. In 1971 the provincial government declared Gastown a historical site, protecting its heritage buildings. Major street improvements and a general revitalization followed. Yaletown underwent a similar transformation of its early 20th century warehouse and low-rise office buildings in the 1990s and early 2000s. Chinatown remains a thriving community and tourist destination. More recently condominiums and social housing have moved into these districts in both renovated historic buildings and in new construction.

Beginning in the early 1970s the waterfront industrial buildings and lands of Granville Island were transformed into a vibrant mixed-use area. Industrial buildings were re-purposed and new buildings with a similar scale and aesthetic were erected to provide a public market, artisan studios, retail stores, performing arts venues, restaurants, and a hotel alongside existing industry. In the 1980s several Edwardian-era buildings were connected by a covered atrium to form the Sinclair Centre shopping and retail complex. City Square Mall was a similar redevelopment for the Model School and Normal School.

In 2010, the city landmark, Woodward's Department Stores flagship with its distinctive neon "W" rooftop sign, was redeveloped in 2010 as a mixed-use development known as the Woodward's Building. It incorporates a new condominium tower, social housing, community services, retail, and parts of SFU's downtown campus.

== Urban planning ==
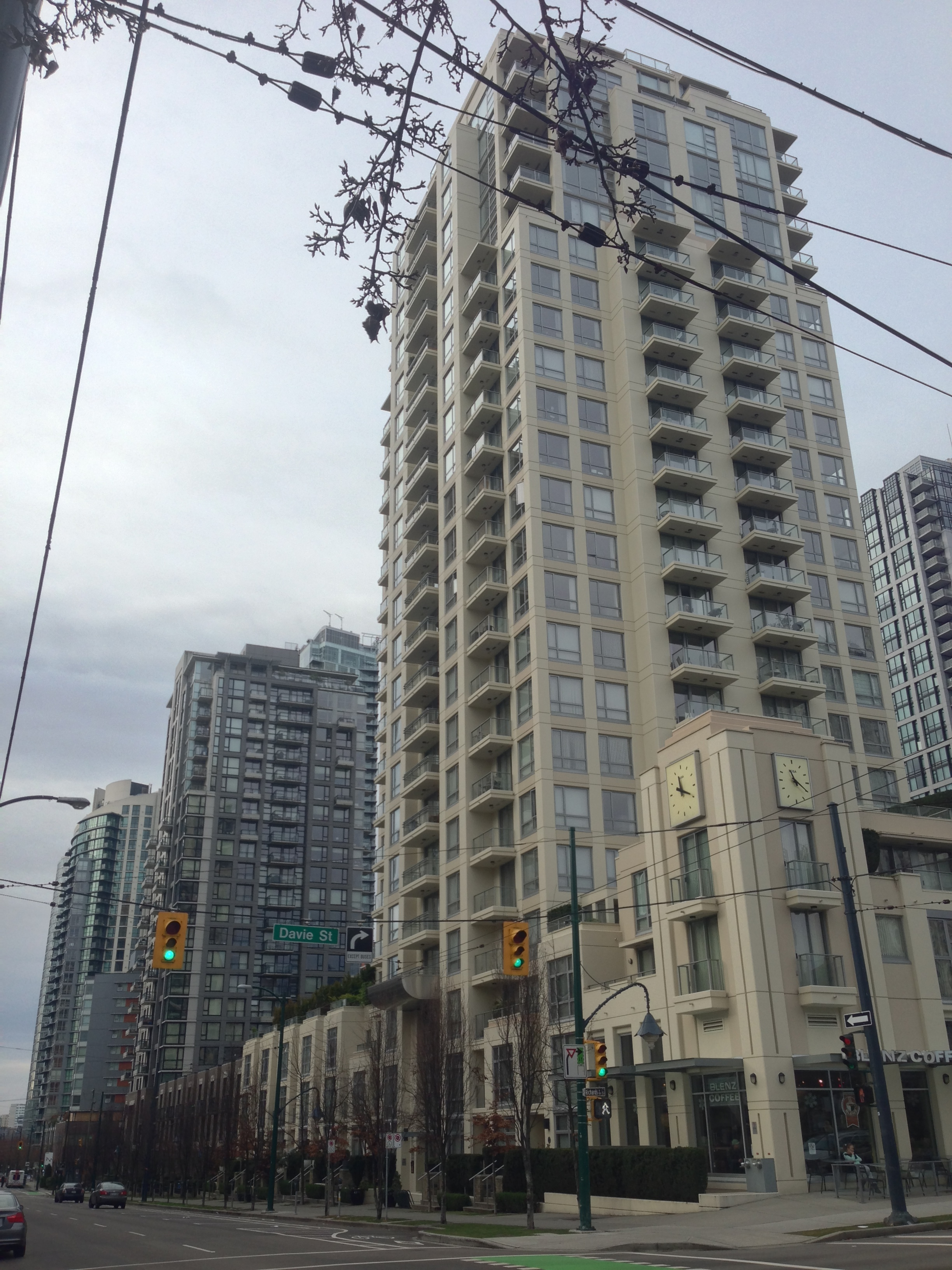
Urban Vancouver holds an abundance of "point towers", a design that has slender towers anchored by townhouses or retail shops at its base.

Unlike many cities, Vancouver and its suburbs have no large plazas, squares, or public gathering spaces in the heart of the urban areas. The largest are the relatively small, terraced areas in Victory Square or Robson Square. Instead, cities in the Greater Vancouver Regional District are dotted with regular green spaces with 92% of residents of Vancouver proper being within a 5-minute walk of a green-space.

Vancouver's main public spaces are at the periphery: landscaped parks, the waterfront Plaza of Nations, the waterfront promenade at Canada Place, and the most active public space in the regions, the 22 km (13.7mile) long Seawall that rings the downtown peninsula. One possible influence for this was the 1935 Battle of Ballantyne Pier and reading of the Riot Act near Victory Square; shortly afterwards the location for the new city hall was selected out of the downtown core.

A modern hallmark of urban Vancouver is the abundance of slender "point towers" above low-rise podiums, also a key aspect of "Vancouverism." This urban design movement advocates high-density residential buildings with an emphasis on views, natural light, urban landscaping, public amenities, and active, pedestrian-oriented streets. Continuous podiums with retail or townhouses at the base define the street edge and add vibrancy. Slender towers allow more natural light to reach the street, a feature for the region's climate, and open view corridors of the sea and surrounding mountains. These features became key aspects of the city's zoning regulations.

As with many North American cities, much of the architecture and development of Vancouver occurred during the age of the private automobile. The cities in the region have implemented policies to reduce dependency on the automobile. Urban density and pedestrian-friendly streets are supported, and local, regional and provincial governments have launched initiatives to encourage the use of bicycles. The regional transit system is a comprehensive network of buses, rapid buses, passenger ferries, commuter trains, and the light rapid transit (not light rail) SkyTrain that links downtown with Vancouver International Airport and regional centres in Burnaby's Metrotown, Coquitlam, Surrey City Centre, and Richmond. The regional centres have developed into dense urban cores with commercial and residential high-rises. This is a direct result of the Greater Vancouver Regional District's (now Metro Vancouver) 1996 Livable Region Strategic Plan, which encouraged the development of a compact, livable metropolitan region, with eight regional town centres and the main downtown core.

Vancouver's West End, a primarily residential area approximately one mile square on the downtown peninsula between the central business district and Stanley Park, is the most densely populated neighbourhood in Canada. Vancouver has developed zoning to encourage high-density commercial, retail, and residential development around downtown and transit centres. Between 2001 and 2011, the population of Vancouver's downtown doubled; including the West End, the downtown peninsula's population increased from approximately 70,000 to over 99,000. In the same period, automobile traffic dropped by 10 percent and as of 2012, the City of Vancouver "has the lowest carbon emissions per capita of any major city in North America."

=== Sustainability ===
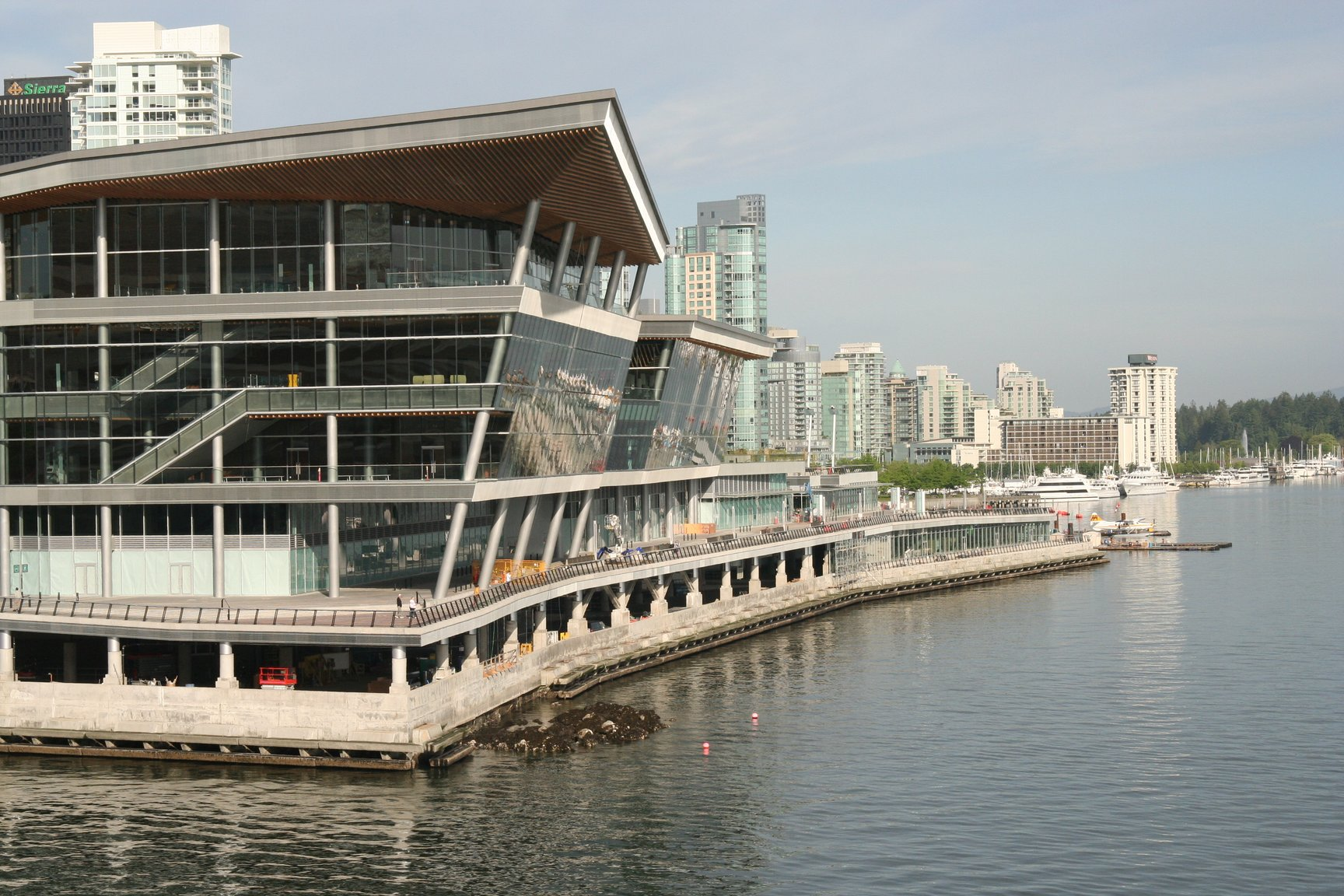
The west building of the Vancouver Convention Centre was designed with sustainability in mind. Its roof is the largest living roof in Canada.

Metro Vancouver's Regional Growth Strategy encourages densification of development as a sustainable strategy and the city's stated policy is to become most sustainable city in the world by 2020. The policy includes changes to the City's Building By-Law, inclusion "(requiring) all buildings constructed from 2020 onward to be carbon neutral in operations" and "to reduce energy use and greenhouse gas emissions in existing buildings by 20% over 2007 levels." Several buildings have achieved widespread recognition for their leadership in sustainable design:

- The C. K. Choi Building at UBC, opened in 1994 and was quickly recognized as a pioneer of green building practices, including winning the American Institute of Architects' Earth Day 2000 Award.
- UBC's Centre for Interactive Research on Sustainability, opened in 2011, was designed to be the most innovative and high-performance sustainable building in North America.
- The Vancouver Convention Centre West Building's 6-acre (24,000 m2) "living roof", completed in 2009, is Canada's largest and North America's largest non-industrial living roof and is designed as a self-sustaining habitat characteristic of coastal British Columbia.
- At the 2010 Winter Olympics' Athletes' Village, all 16 residential buildings at were designed to LEED Gold level and the community centre to Platinum level.
- The Telus Garden Office development done by Henriquez Partners Architects Firm received the 2009 LEED Platinum standard with features that include an innovative site wide utility, rainwater harvesting and solar panel systems.

== Residential ==
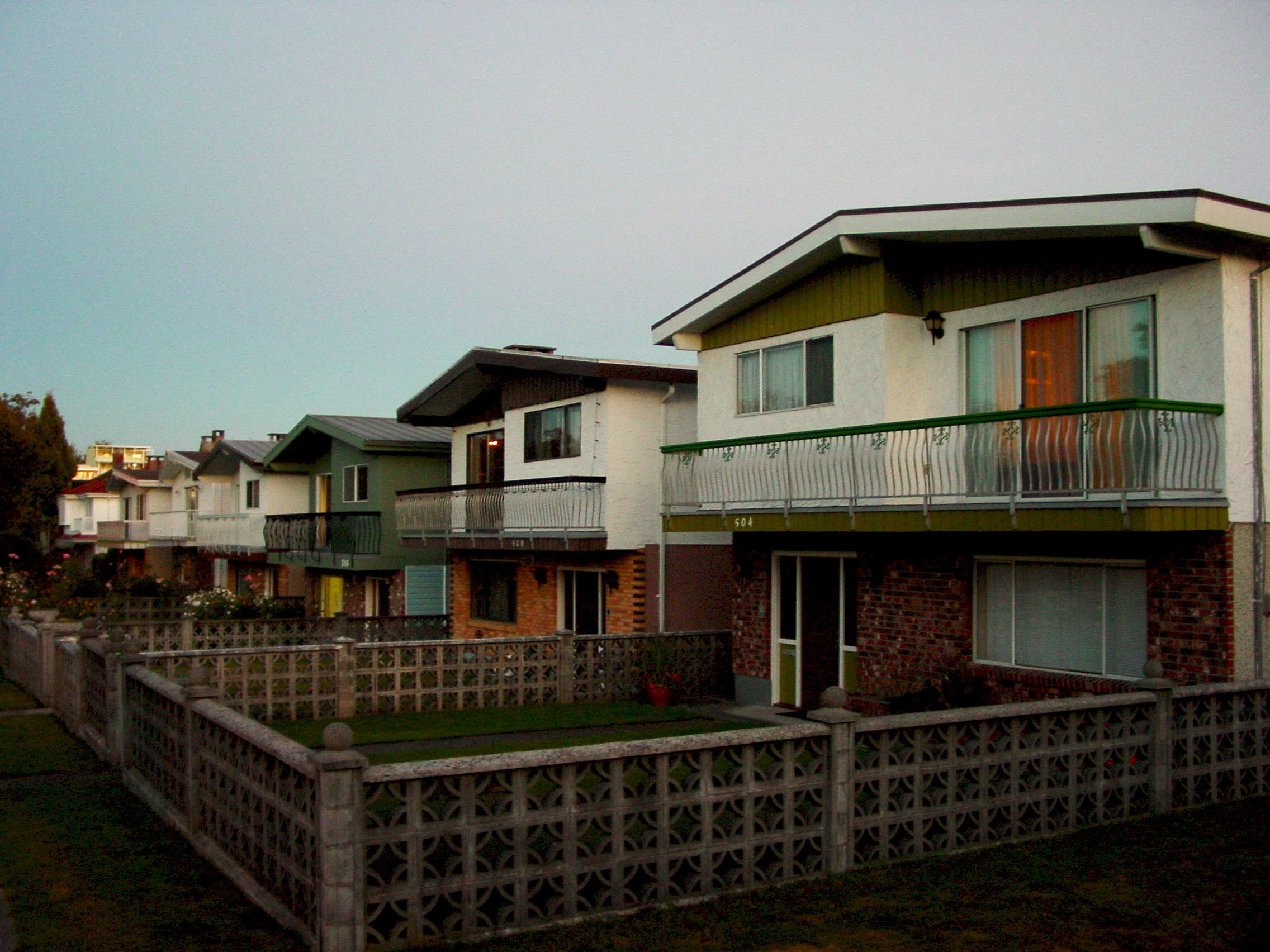
The Vancouver Special is a unique architectural style of housing that emerged in the Lower Mainland from the mid-1960s to 1980s.

Residential architecture is where the West Coast Style began, in particular on view properties on the slopes of the North Shore, West Point Grey, and Burnaby's Capitol Hill. Another, even more prevalent design style that emerged here is known as the Vancouver Special, a simple to construct style used by builders in houses without involvement of a custom designer or architect. Other styles found in the region originated elsewhere, such as the Craftsman style found in many of the mansions in Vancouver's Shaughnessy neighbourhood, and the California Bungalow. A local adaptation of the California Dingbat style is also found in many two-four story apartment buildings built in the 1950s and 1960s.

As of 2011, approximately 34% of owners live in houses, 15% in multi-unit buildings of less than 6 stories, 26% in multi-unit high-rise buildings, 9% in row houses, and the remainder in duplex or movable structures. As with most areas in North America, the vast majority of houses in the region are constructed of wood. A growing number reside in three- to four-story apartment and condominium buildings, commonly constructed of wood, as well as high-rise mainly condominium towers (owner-occupied or investor-owned and rented), normally constructed with a concrete structure.

== Urban time signals ==
Vancouver has several prominent and notable urban time signals:

- 9 O'Clock Gun on the Stanley Park Seawall, pointing downtown, fired each day at 21:00 (9 p.m.) PT, 1898.
- Heritage Horns (Noon horn) at Canada Place on the harbour waterfront, first installed on the former BC Hydro Building in honour of Expo 67 and relocated in the 1990s.
- Steam clock in Gastown, 1977.
- Vancouver Block clocktower near Granville Street and West Georgia St, downtown, 1912.
- Vancouver City Hall's four-sided neon clocktower, 1936.

== Notable architects ==
Moshe Safdie and Cornelia Oberlander are the principal design architects for the downtown Library Square, in collaboration with the firm Downs/Archambault & Partners. Oberlander, a landscape architect based in Vancouver, also includes in her projects Robson Square, the Law Courts, and the UBC Museum of Anthropology. Other notable Vancouver-area architects include:

- Peter Busby (Perkins+Will Canada)
- James K. M. Cheng
- Arthur Erickson
- Fred Hollingsworth
- Henriquez Partners Architects
- Patkau Architects
- MMContext
- Michael Green Architecture
- Francis Rattenbury
- Bing Thom
- Ron Thom
- Barry Downs

== Gallery ==
=== Public and government ===
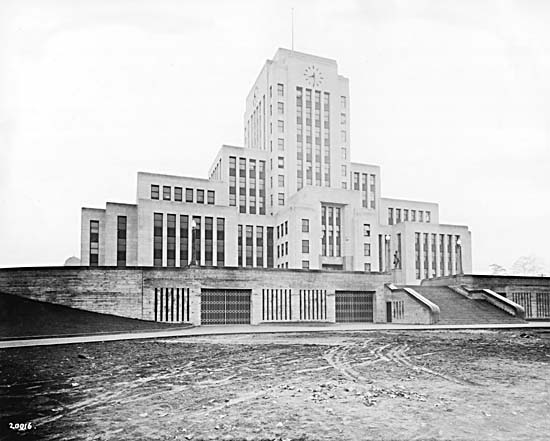
Vancouver City Hall (1936) by Townley & Matheson

Court House (1905) by Francis Rattenbury

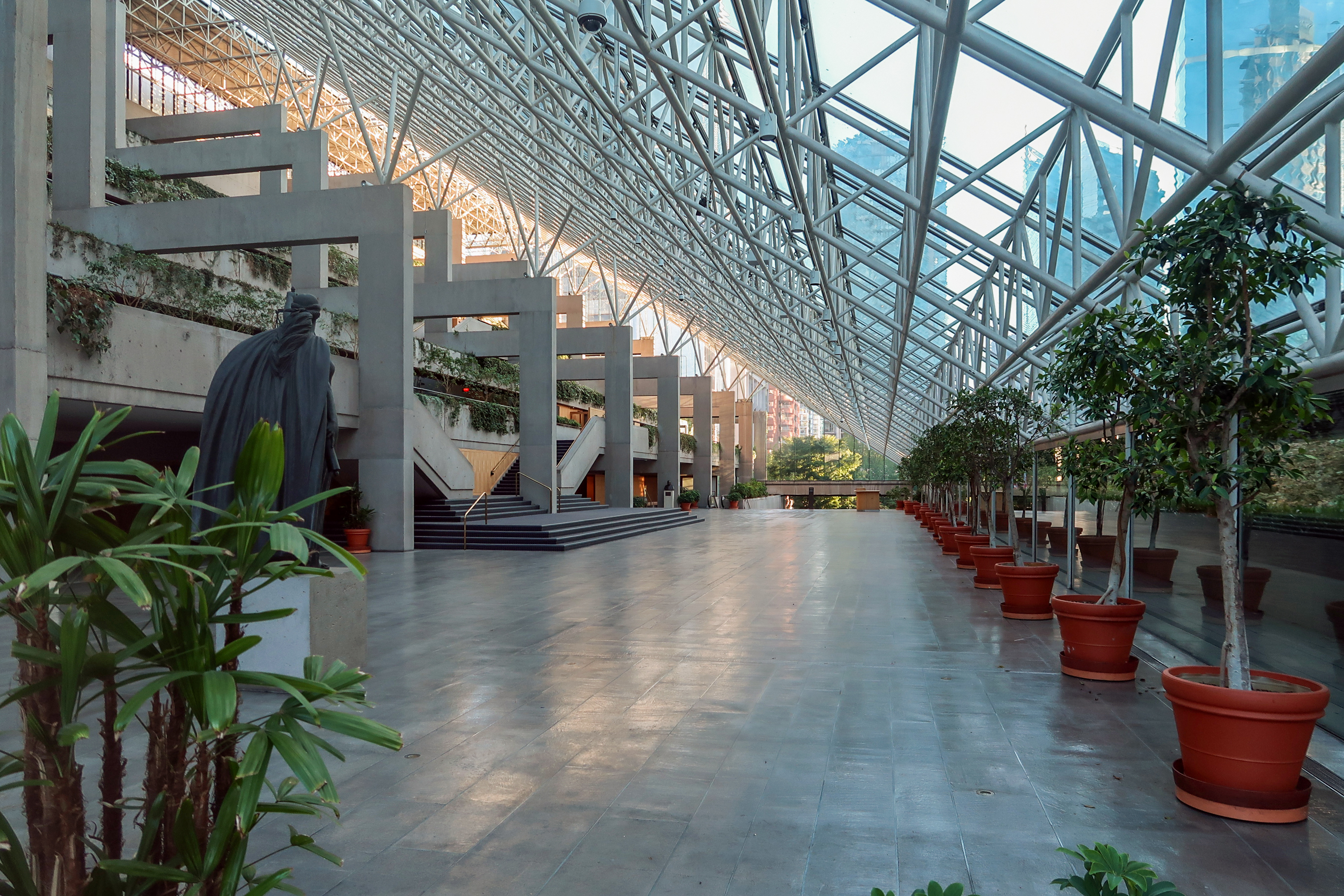
Law Courts (1979) by Arthur Erickson

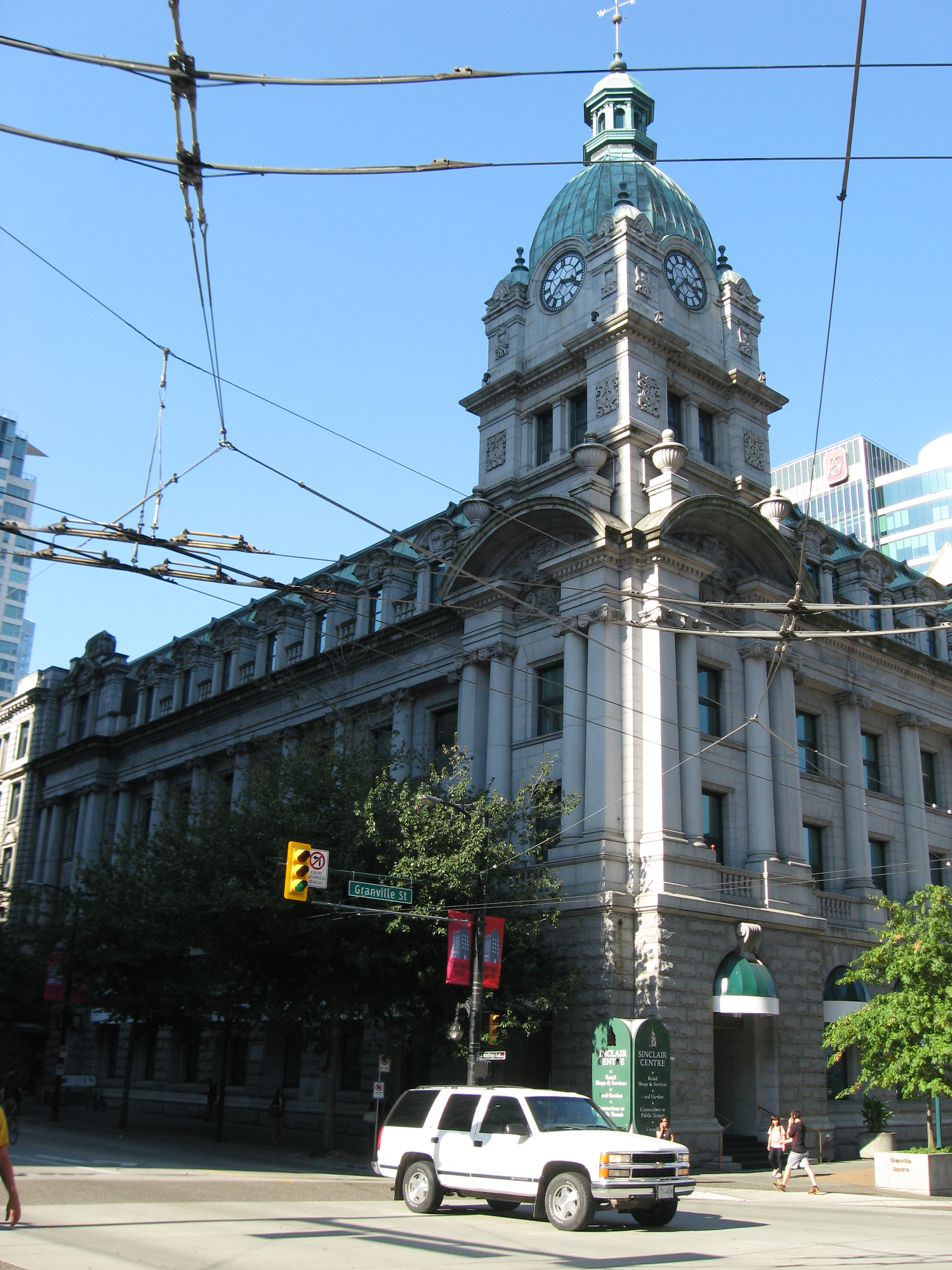
Post Office (1905) by David Ewart

Post Office (1953) by McCarter Nairne & Partners

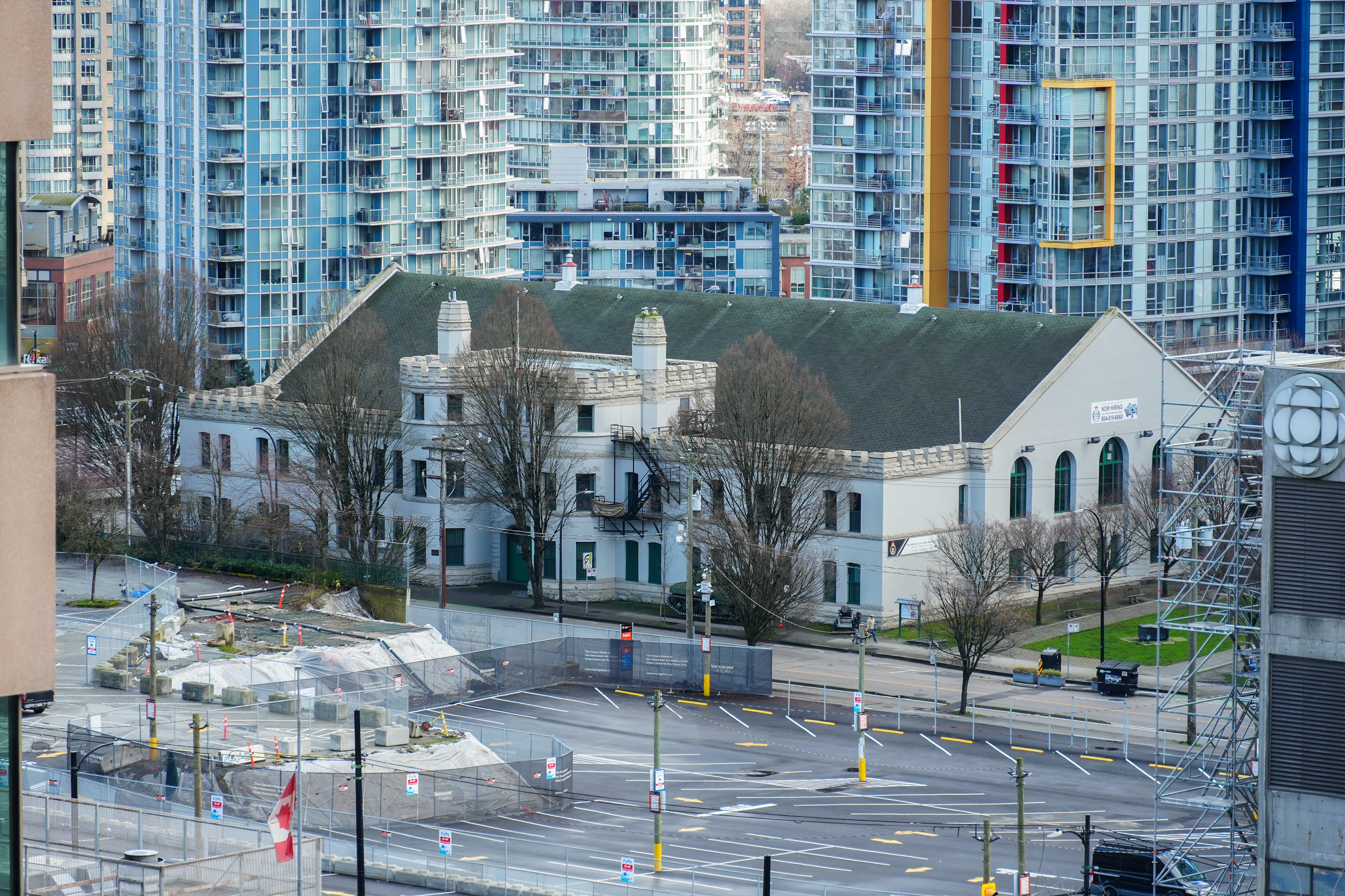
Beatty Street Drill Hall (1899) by David Ewart

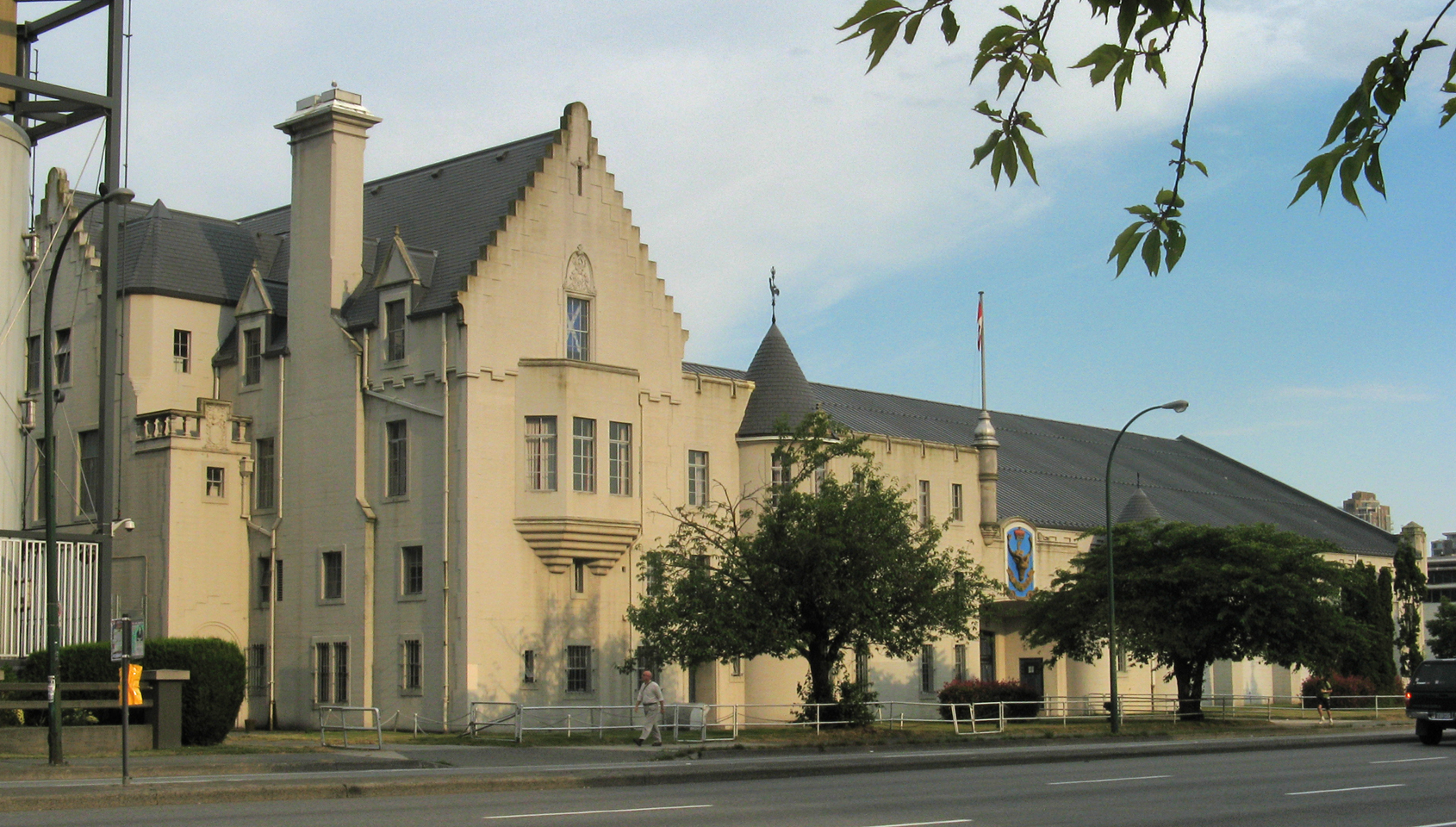
Seaforth Armoury (1930) by McCarter & Nairne

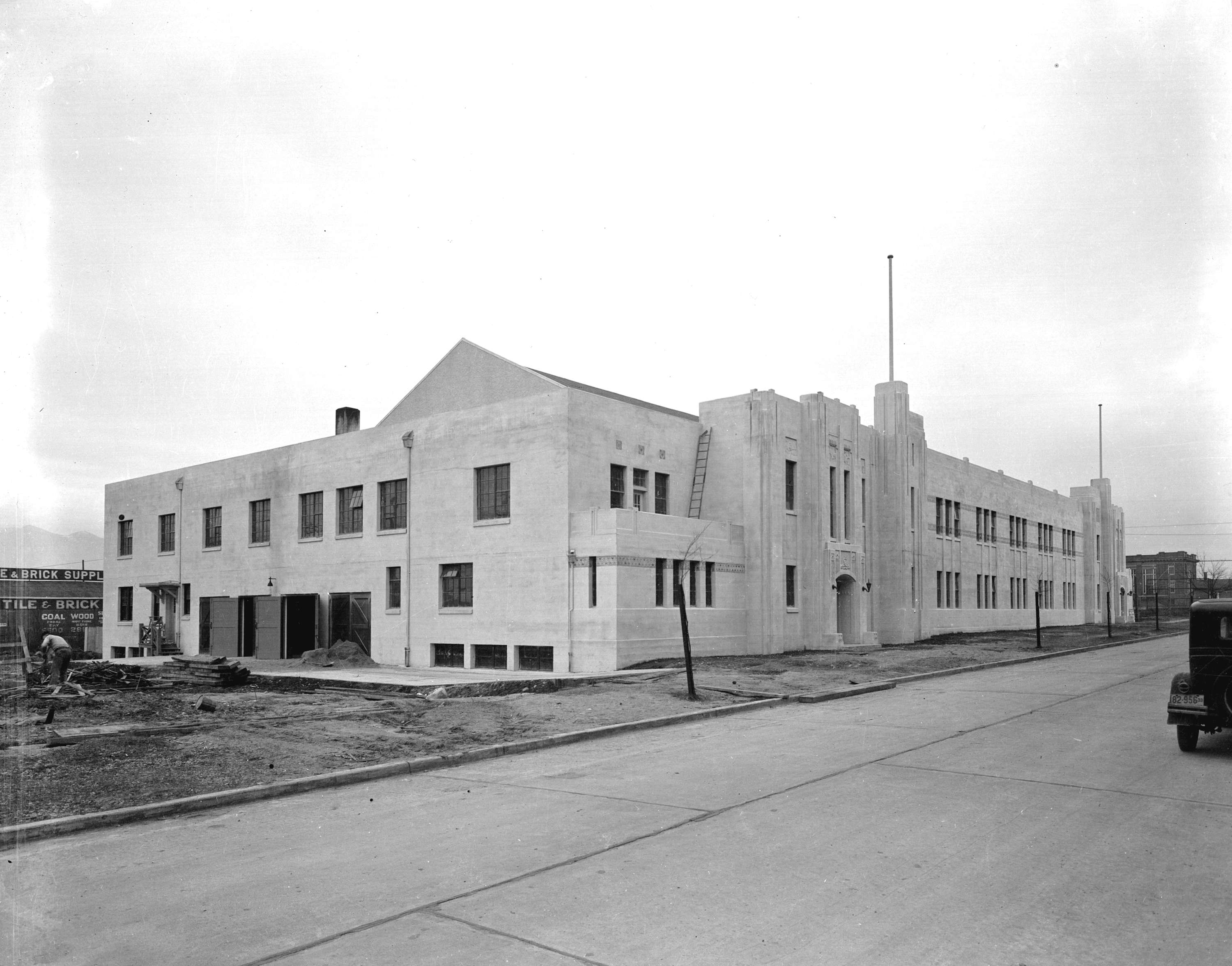
Bessborough Armoury (1932) by Richard T. Perry

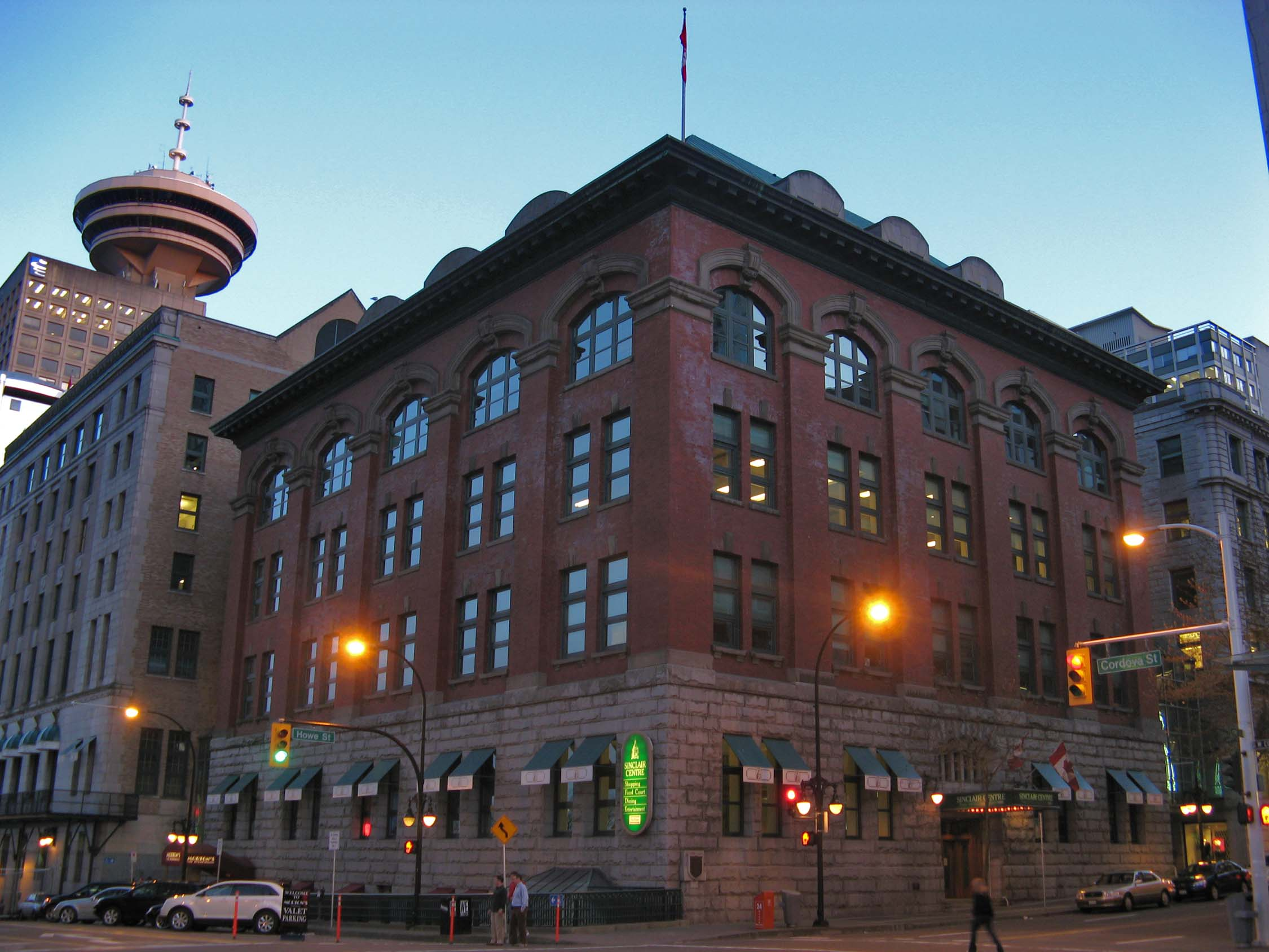
Customs Warehouse (1913) by David Ewart

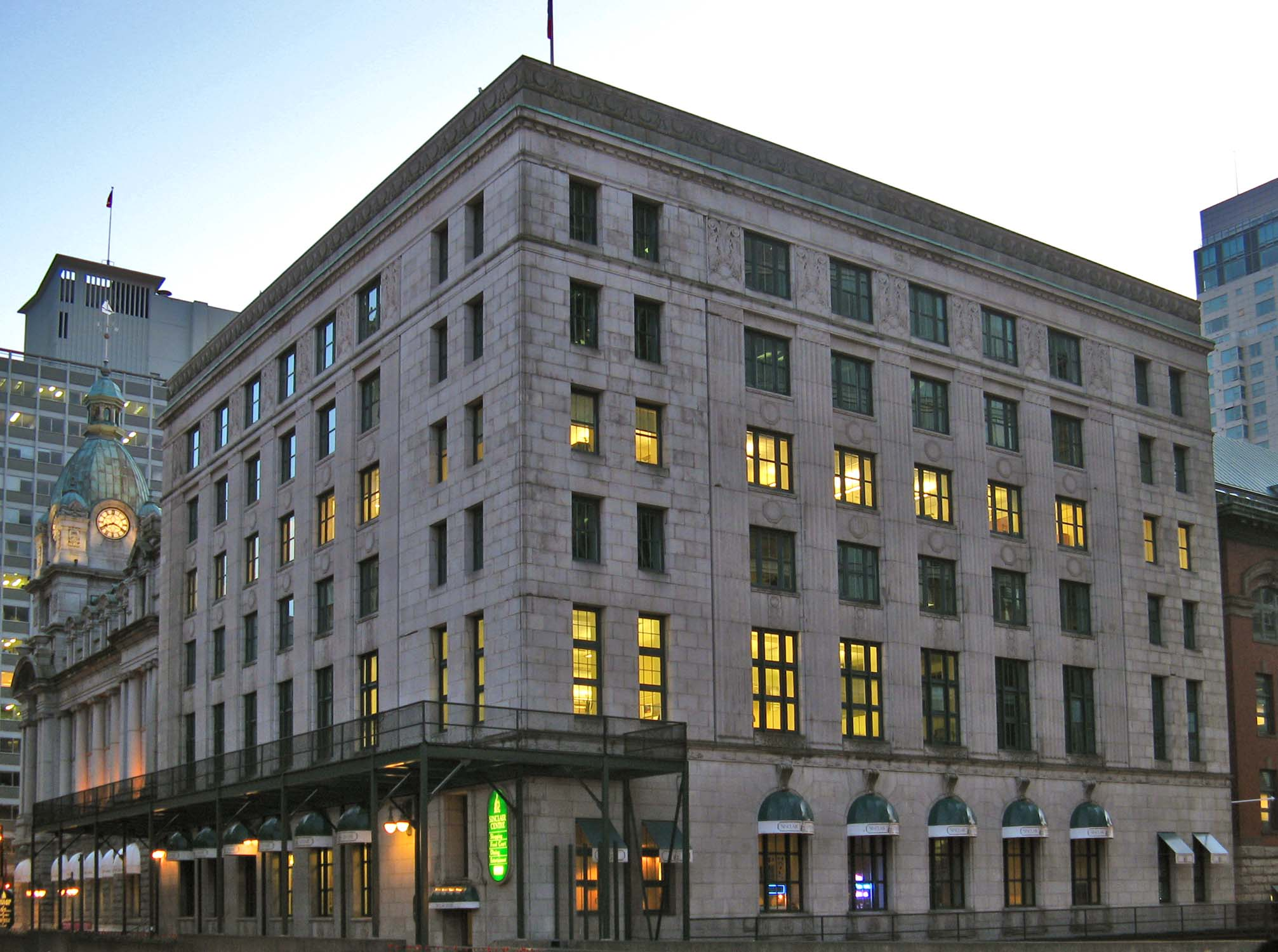
Dominion Public Building (1937) by Thomas W. Fuller

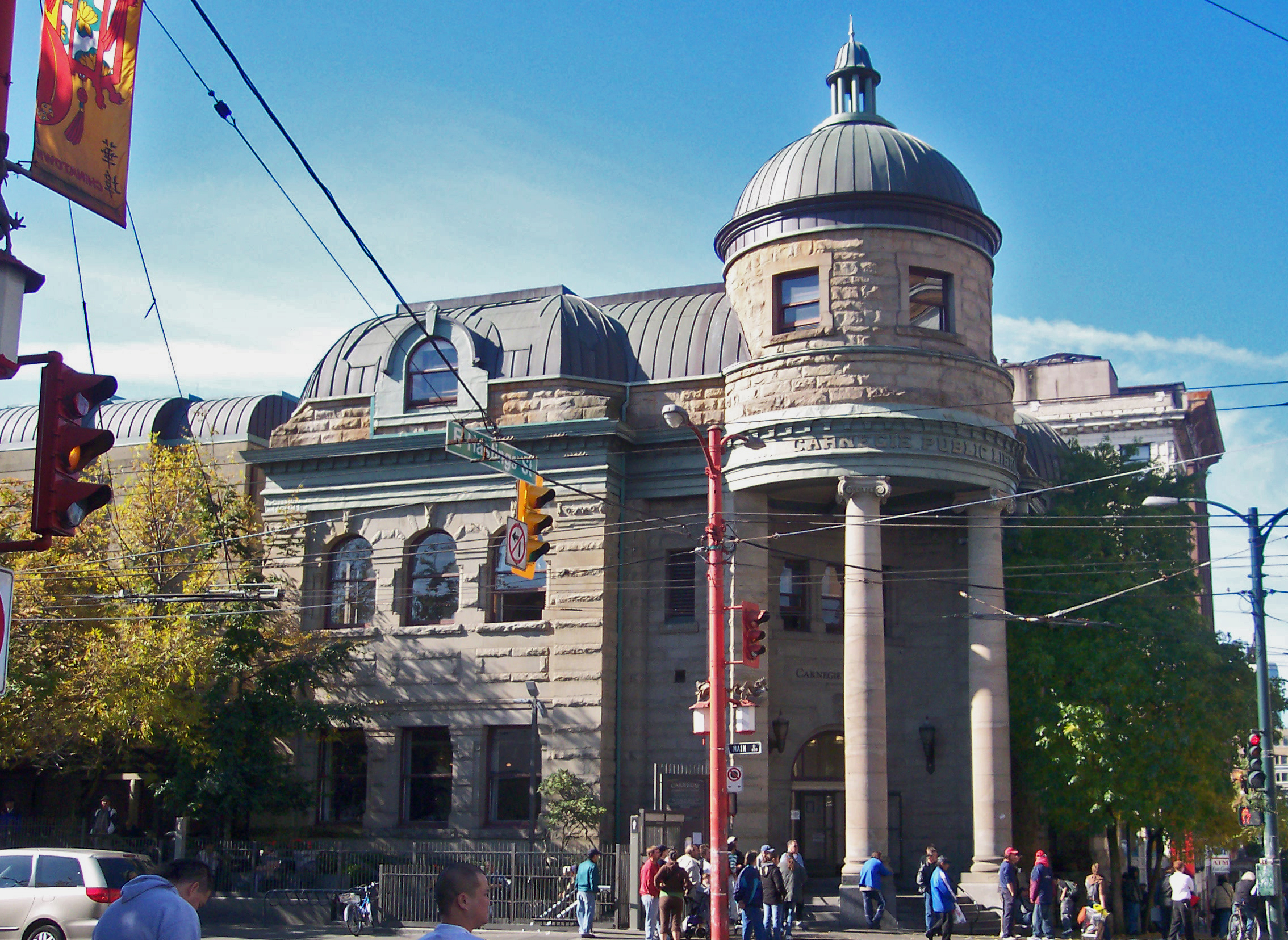
Carnegie Library (1902) by George William Grant

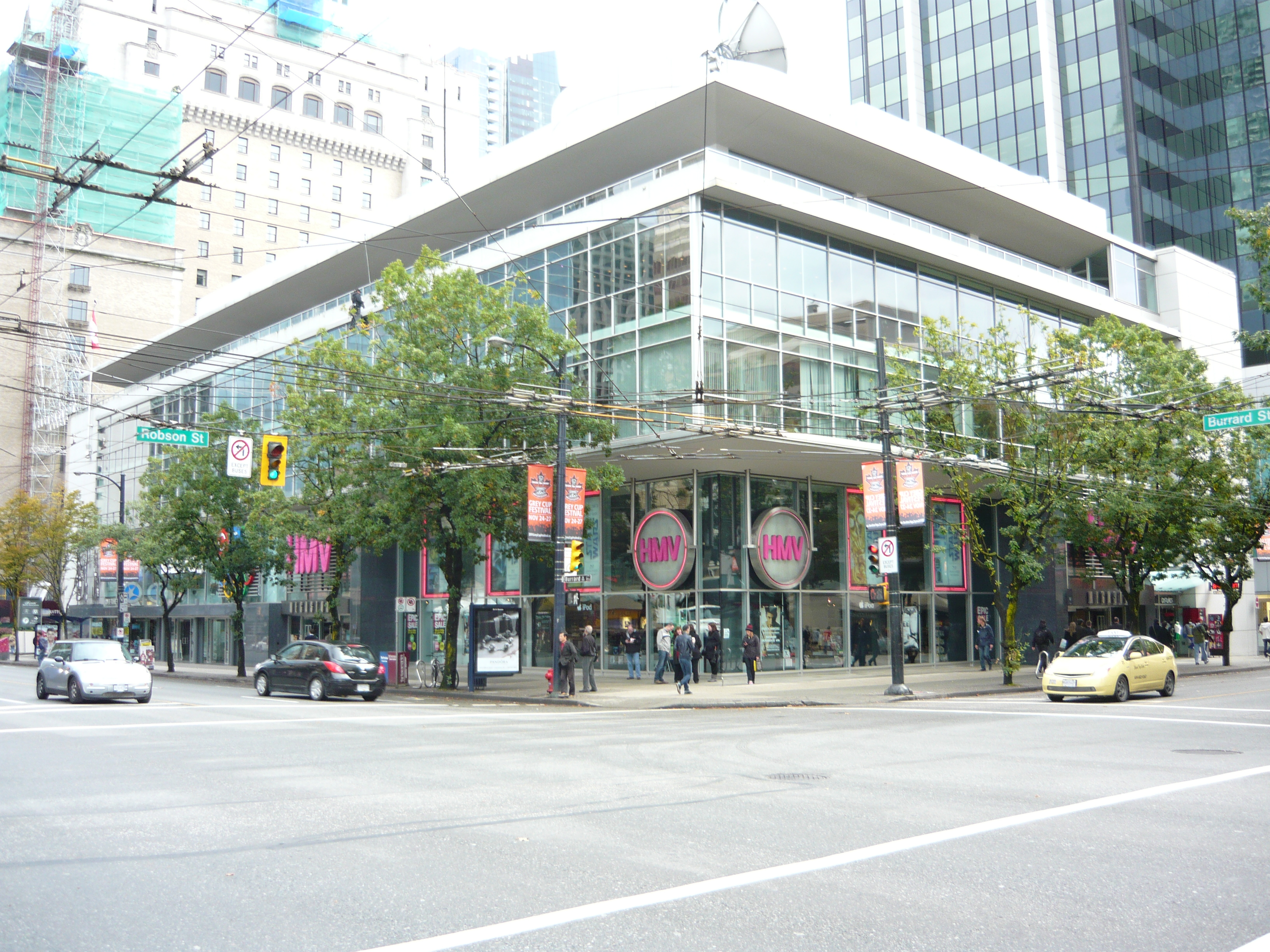
Vancouver Public Library (1957) by Semmens & Simpson

=== Transportation ===
Canadian Pacific Railway station (1898) by E. & W. S. Maxwell

Great Northern Railway station (1914) by Fred Townley

Canadian Northern Railway station (1917) by Pratt & Ross

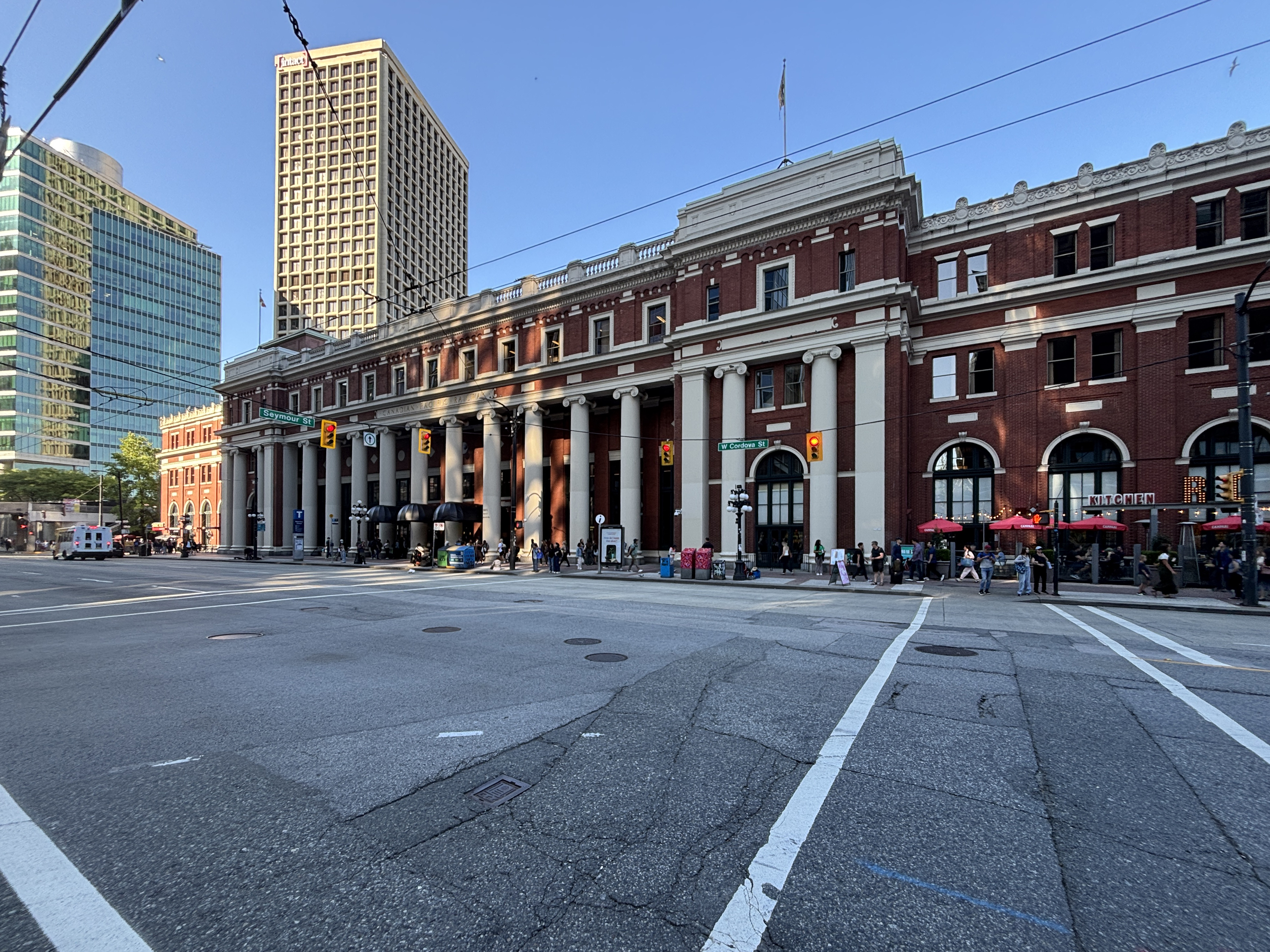
Waterfront station (1914) by Barott, Blackader & Webster

=== Hotels ===
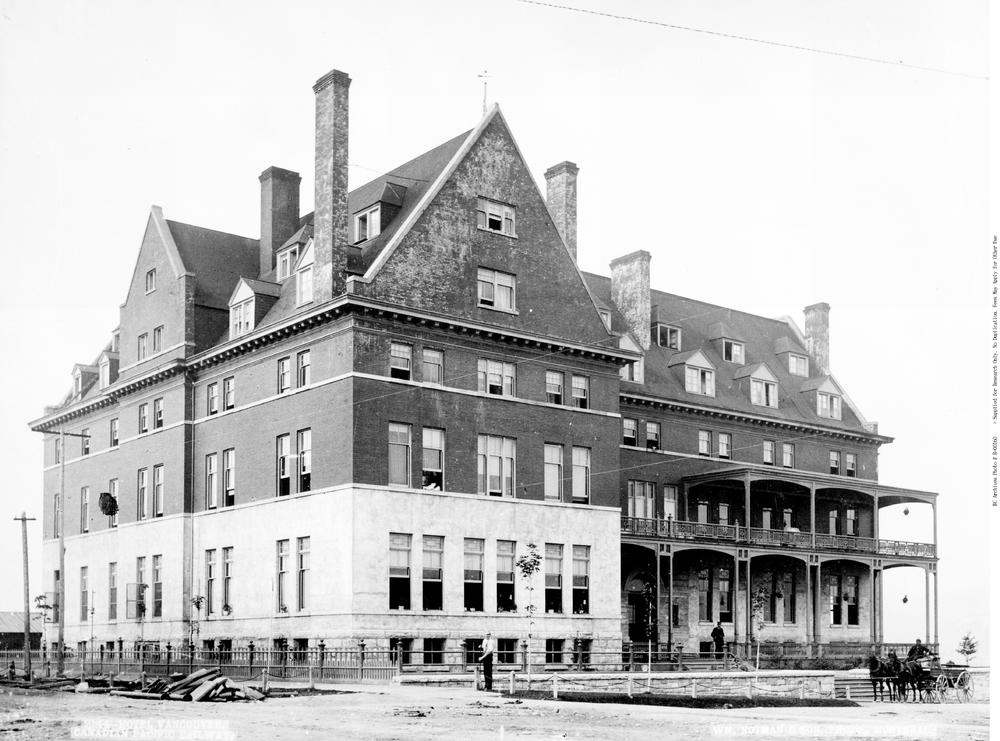
Hotel Vancouver (1888) by Thomas Charles Sorby

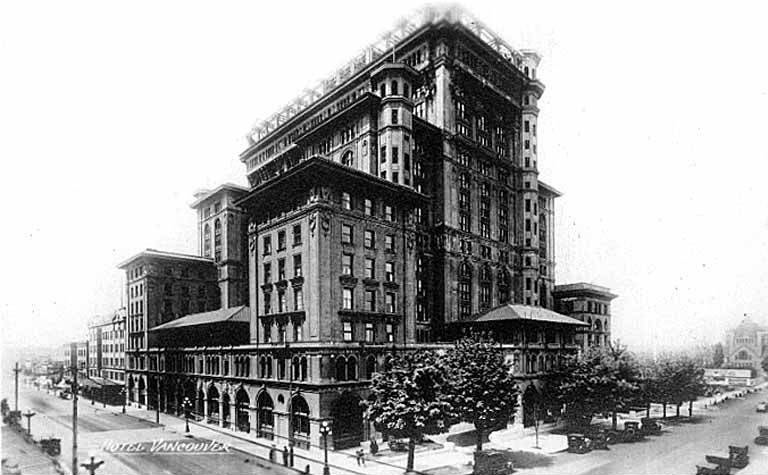
Hotel Vancouver (1916) by Francis S. Swales

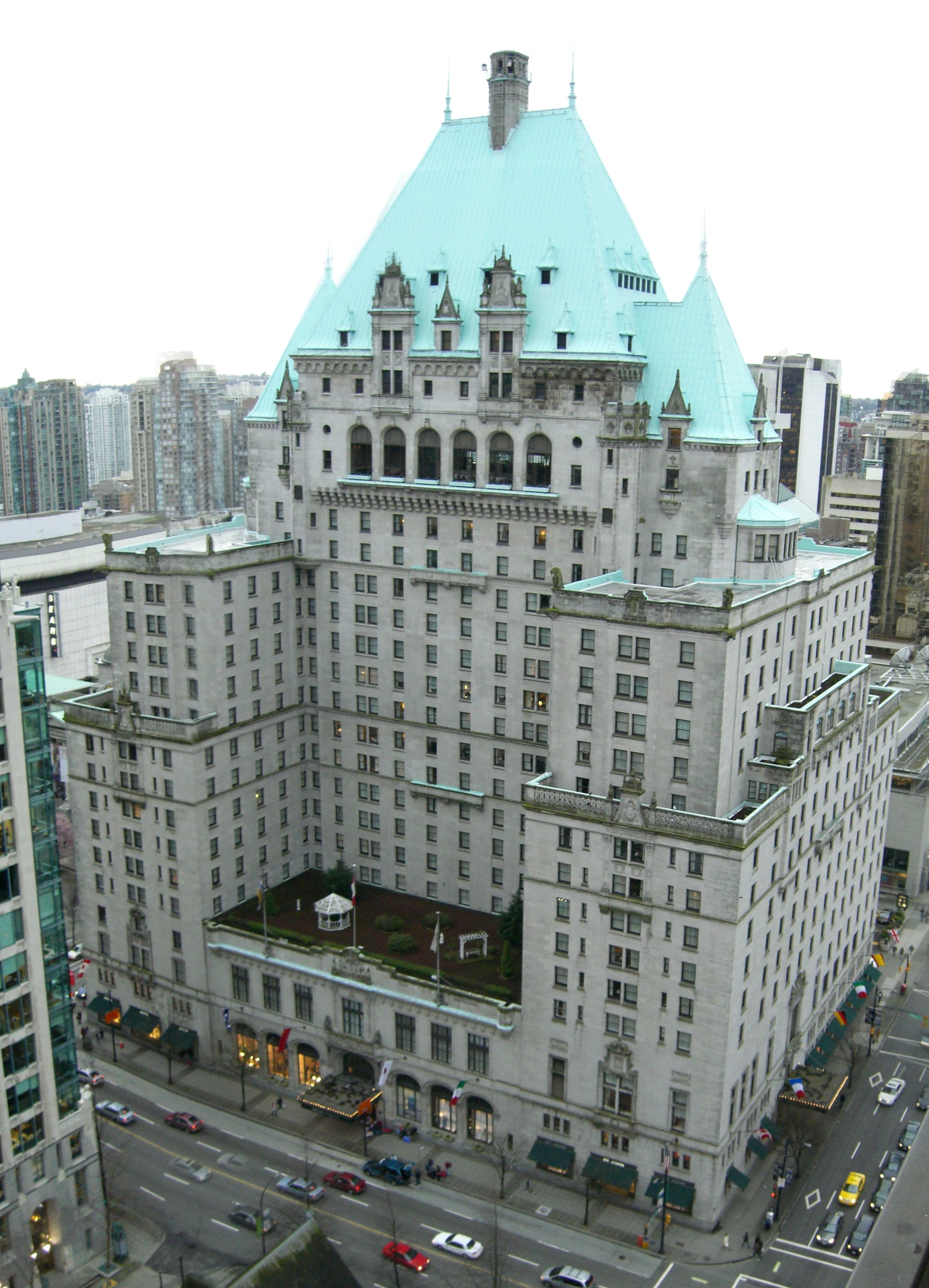
Hotel Vancouver (1939) by Archibald and Schofield

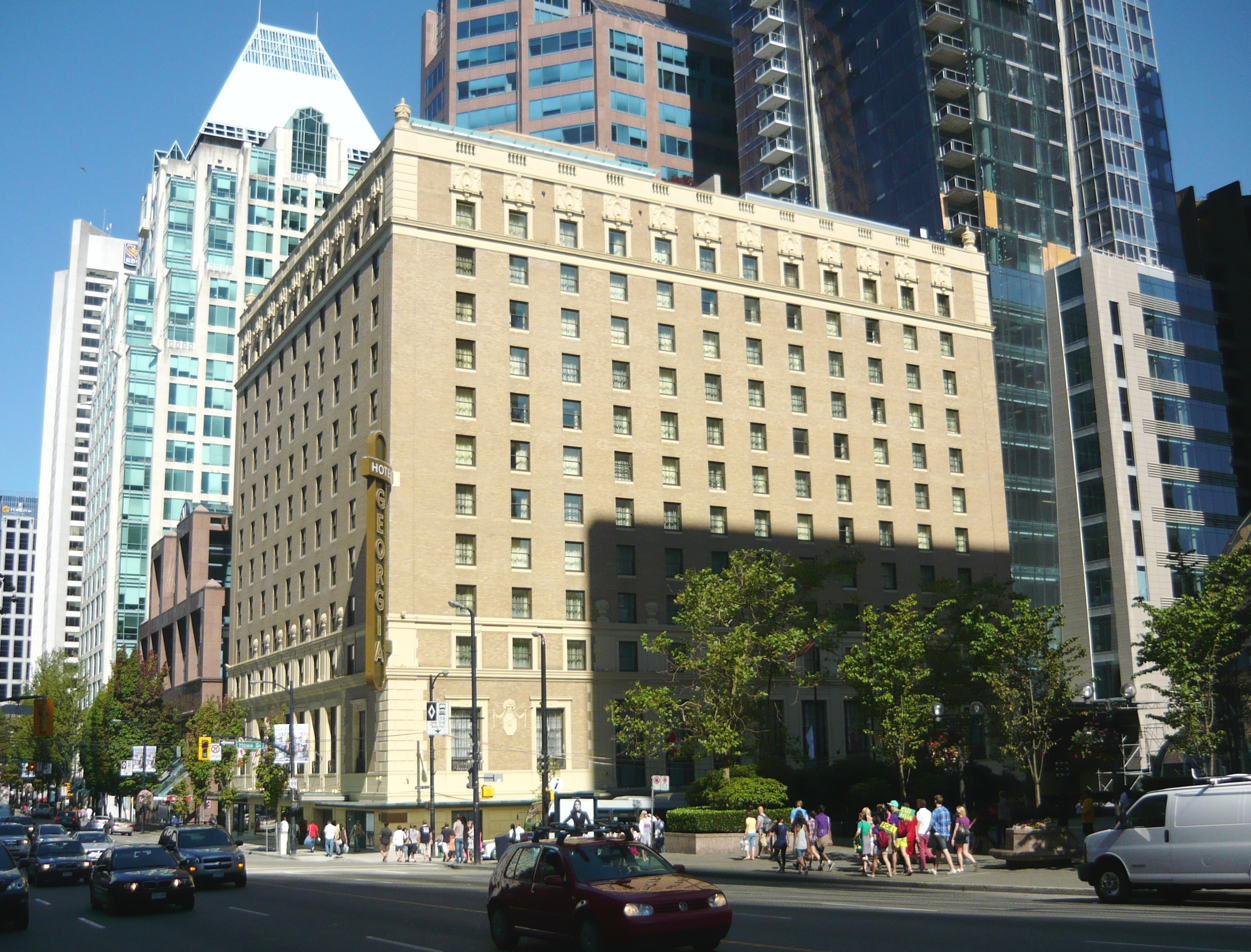
Hotel Georgia (1927) by Garrow & Graham

=== Finance ===
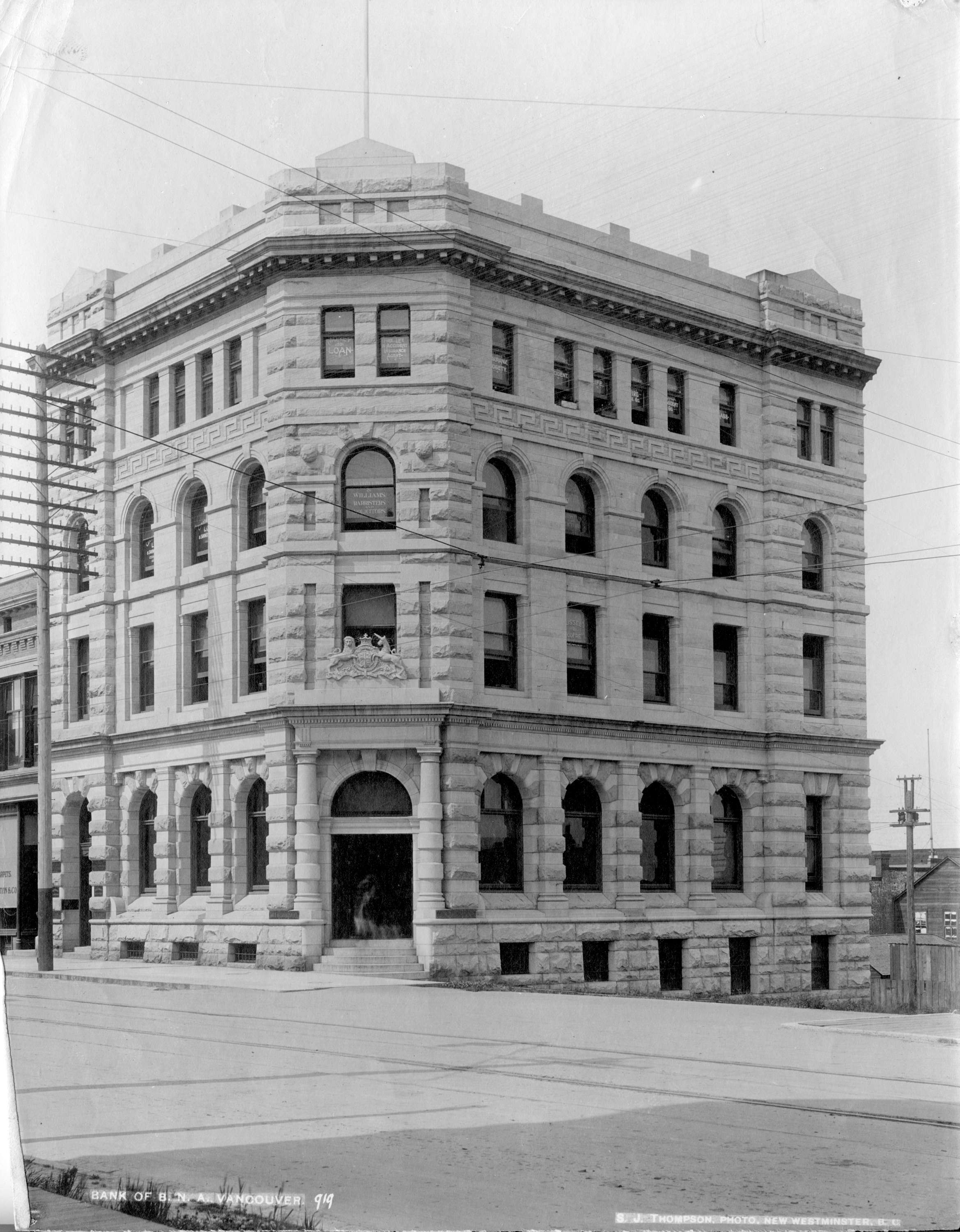
Bank of British North America (1891) by Charles Osborne Wickenden

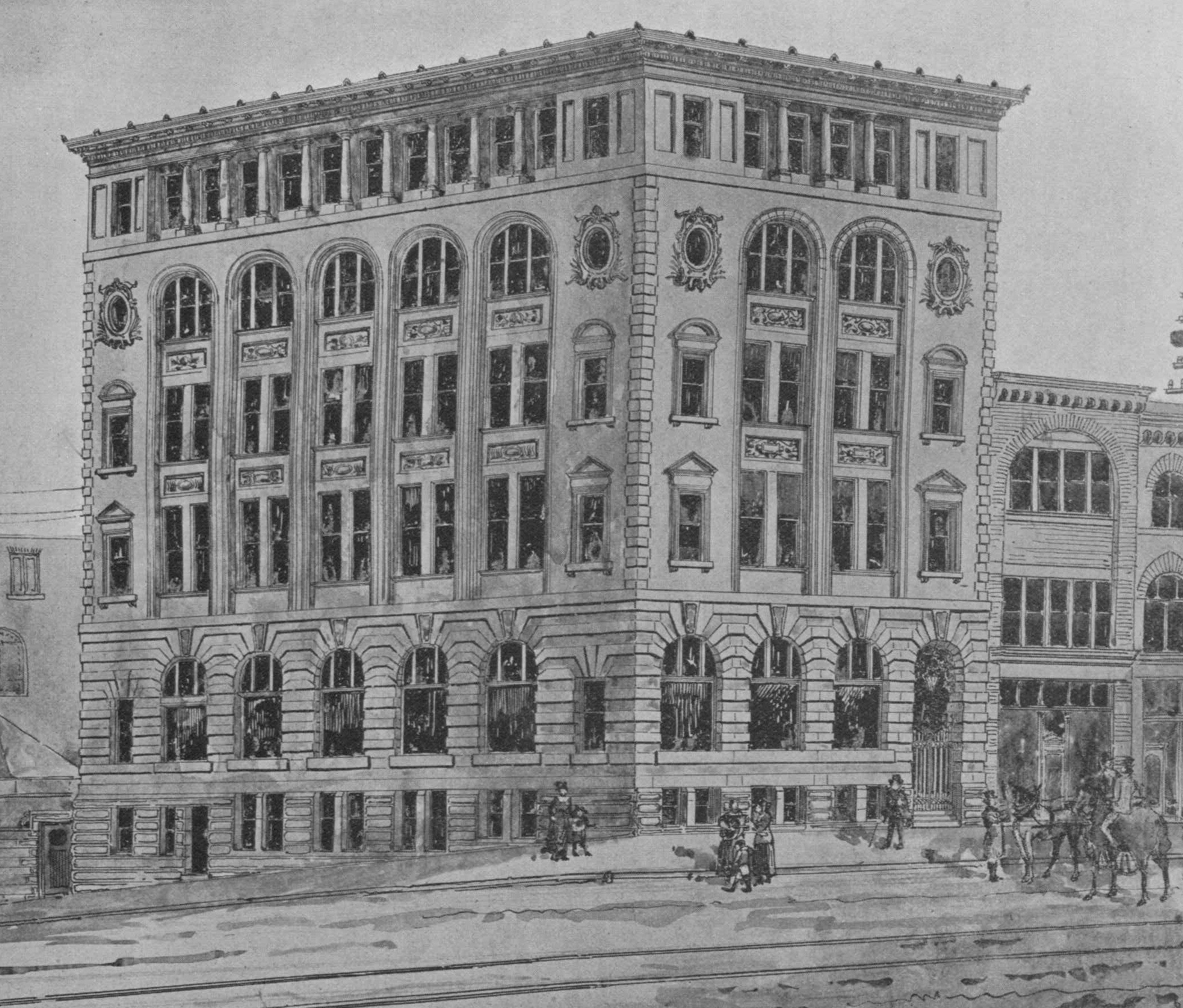
Molsons Bank (1899) by Taylor & Gordon

Canadian Bank of Commerce (1906) by Darling and Pearson

Canada Life (1909) by Darling and Pearson

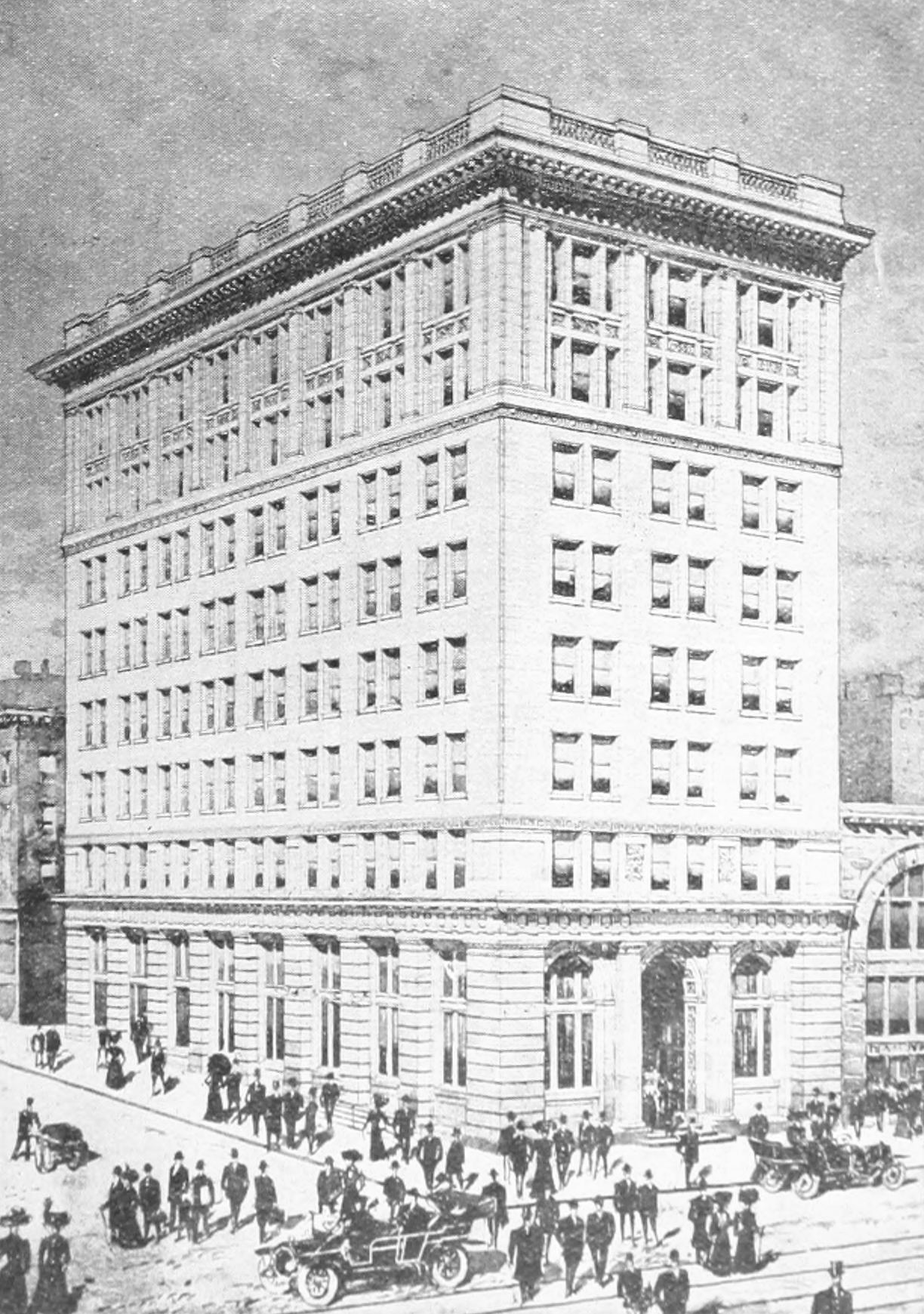
Bank of Ottawa (1912) by W. Marbury Somervell

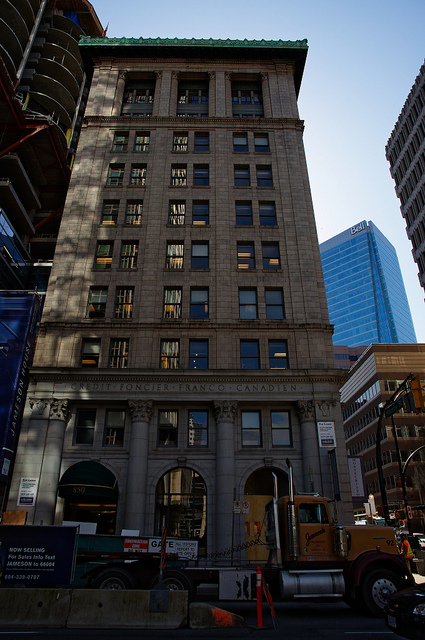
Crédit foncier franco-canadien (1913) by Barrott, Blackader & Webster

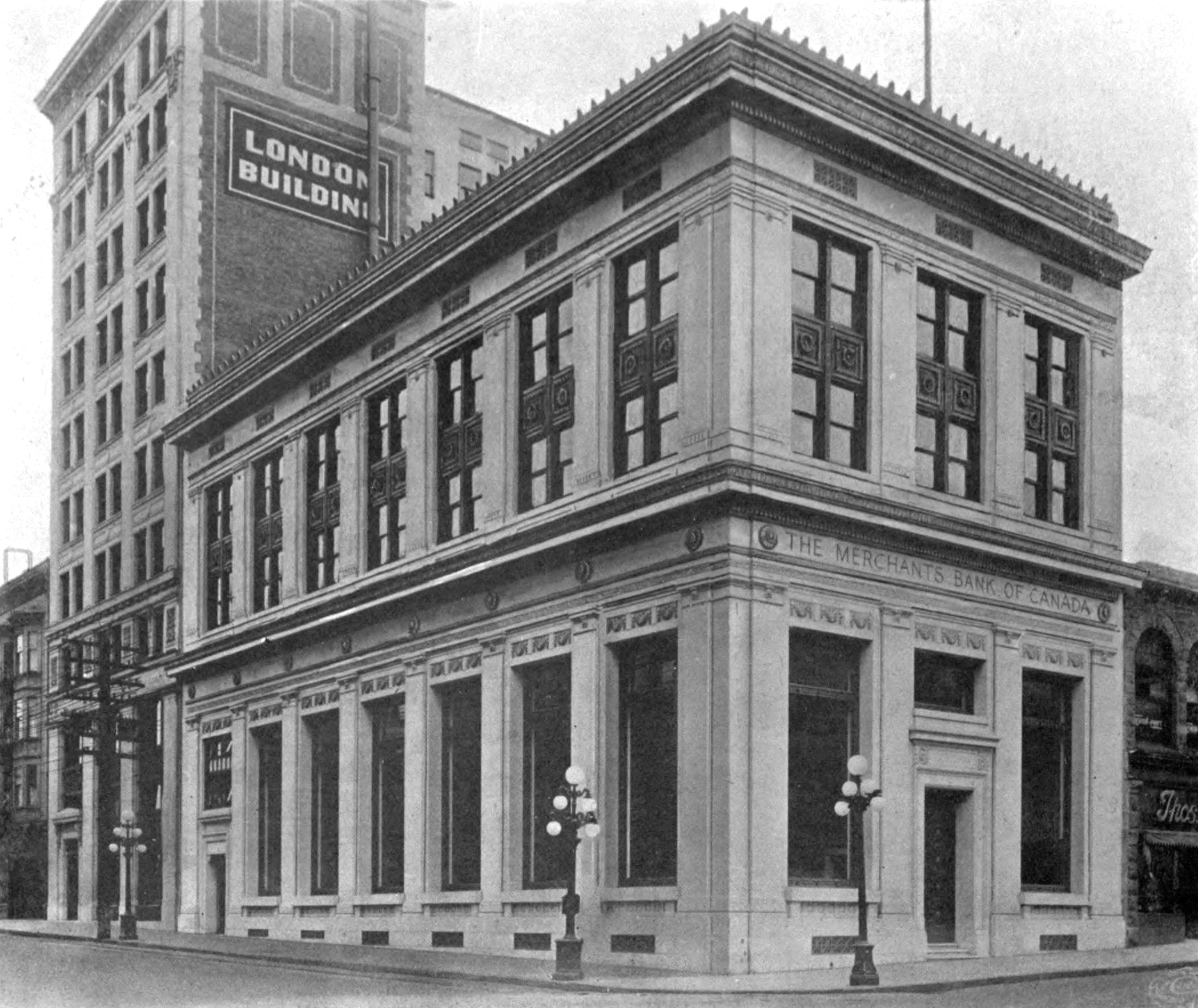
Merchants Bank of Canada (1915) by Somervell & Putnam

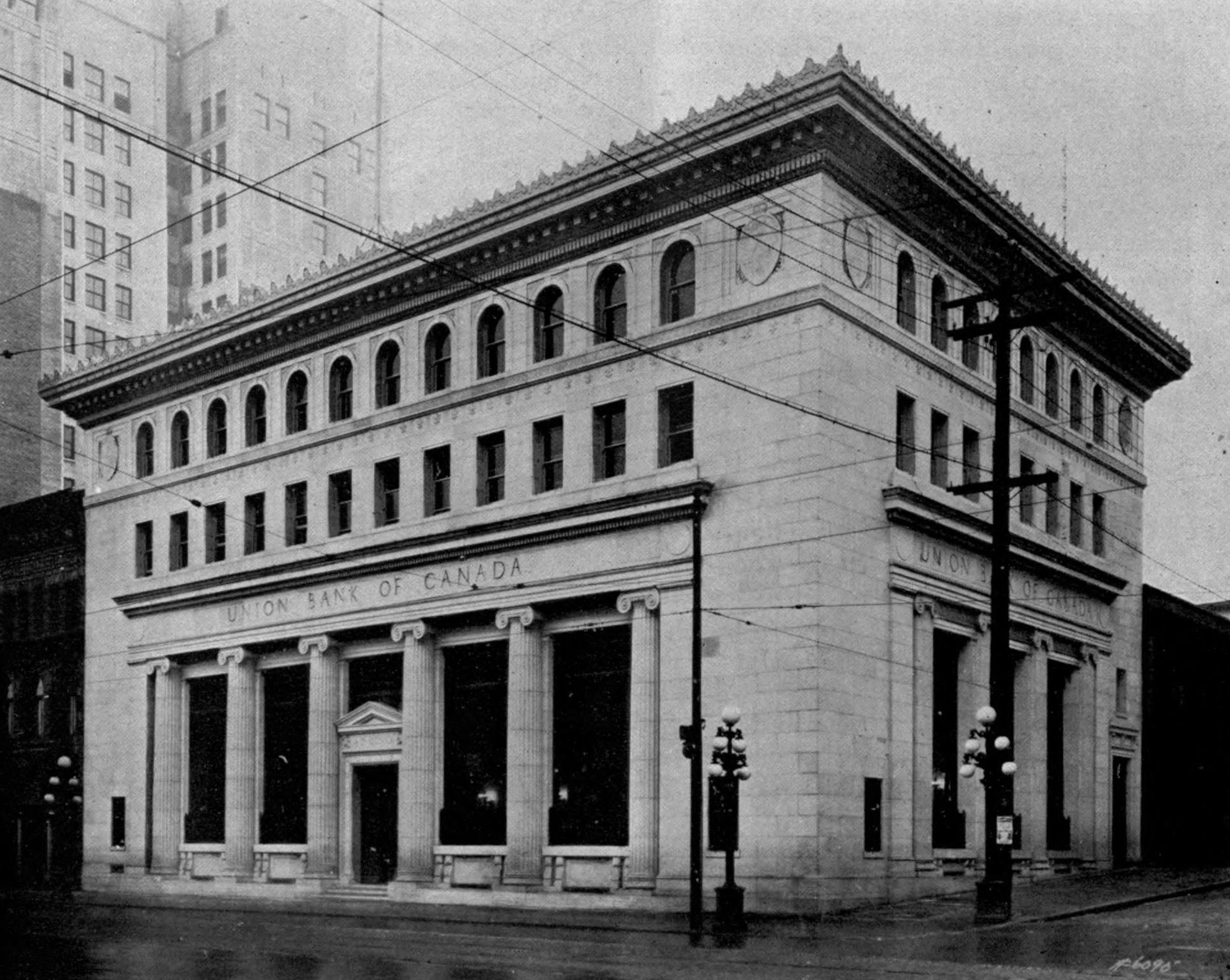
Union Bank of Canada (1919) by Somervell & Putnam

Royal Bank Tower (1929) by Sumner Godfrey Davenport

=== Business blocks ===
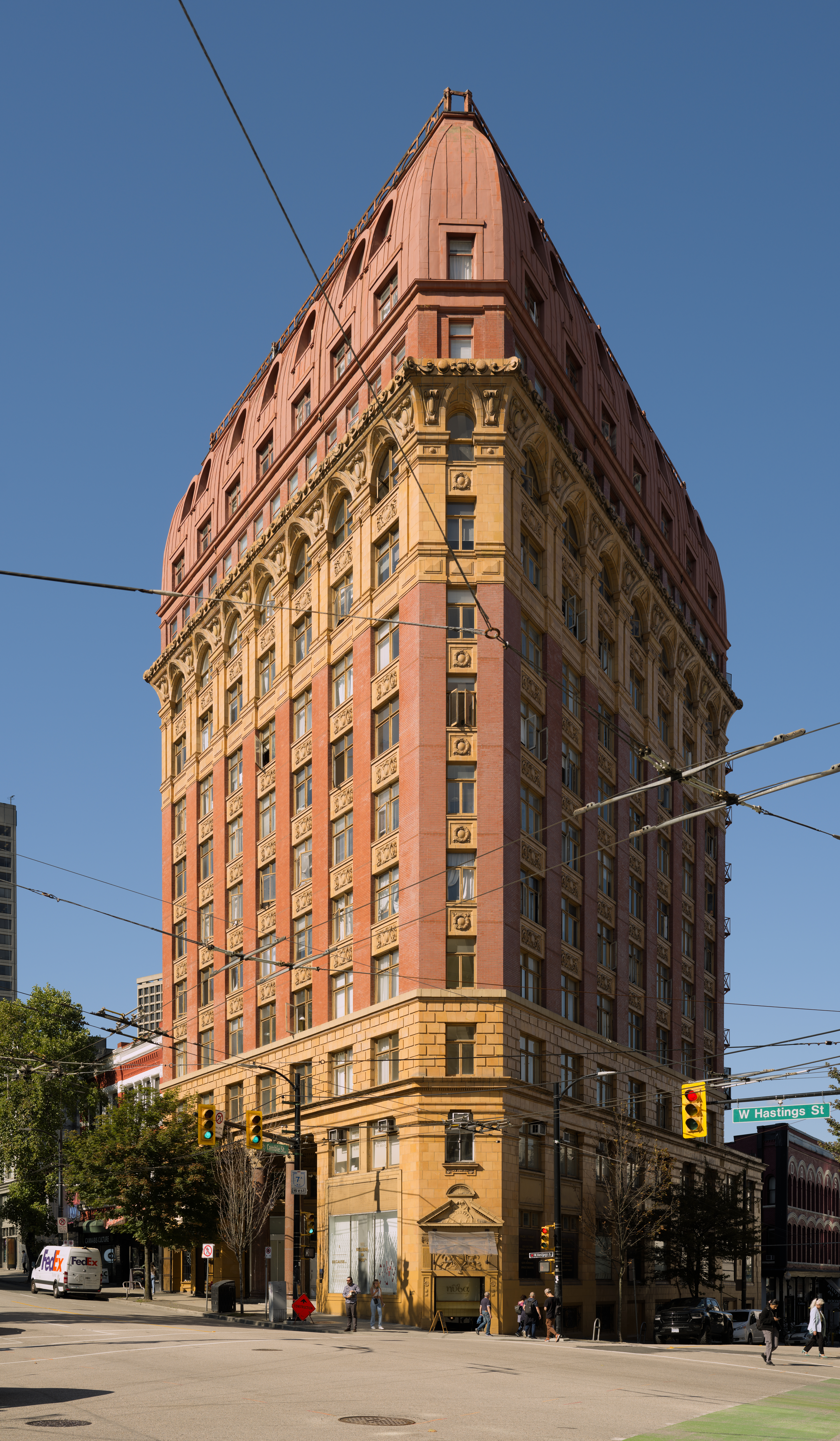
Dominion Building (1906) by J.S. Helyer and Son

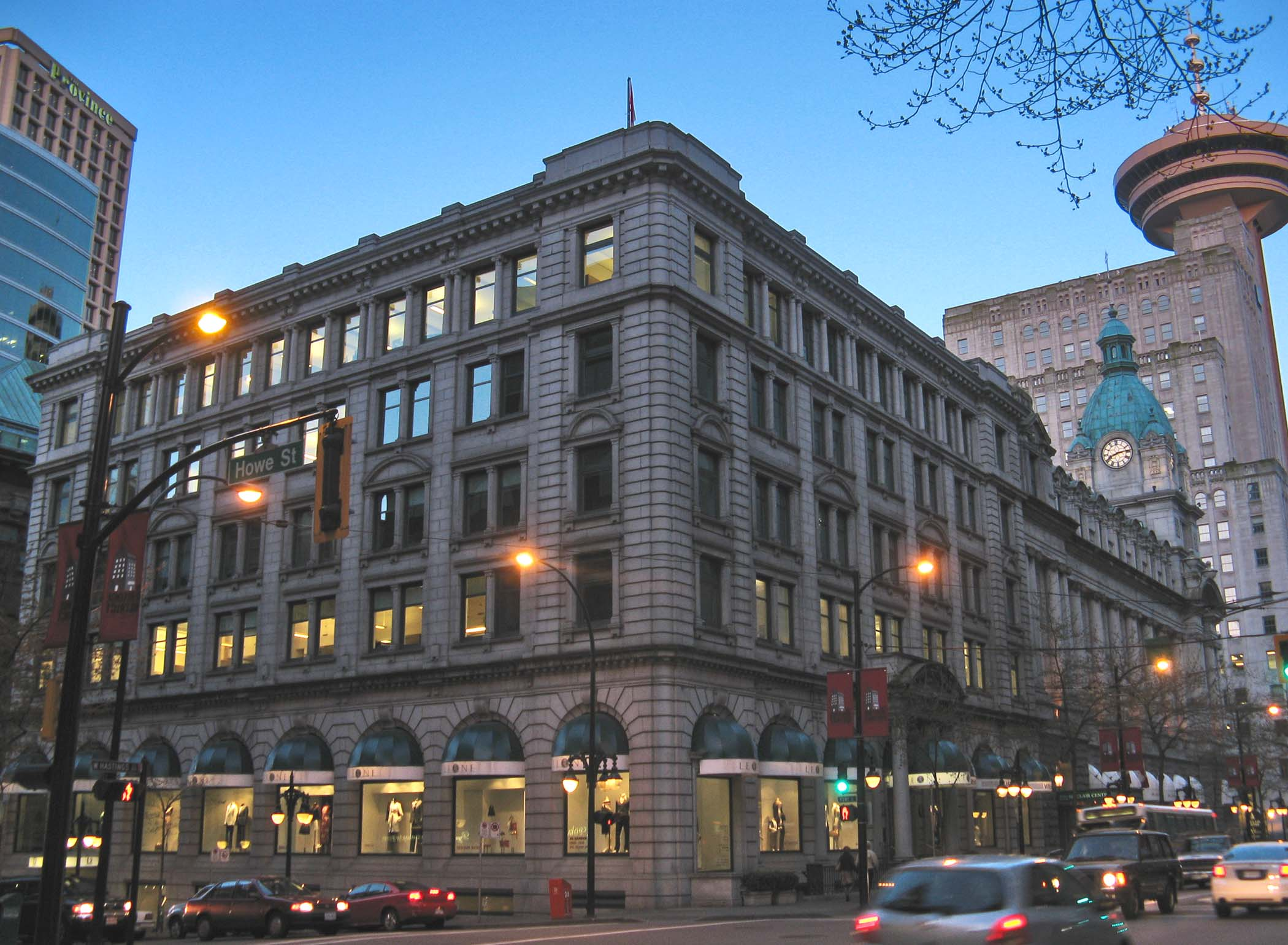
Winch Building (1911) by Hooper & Watkins

Rogers Building (1911) by Gould & Champney

Sun Tower (1911) by William Tuff Whiteway

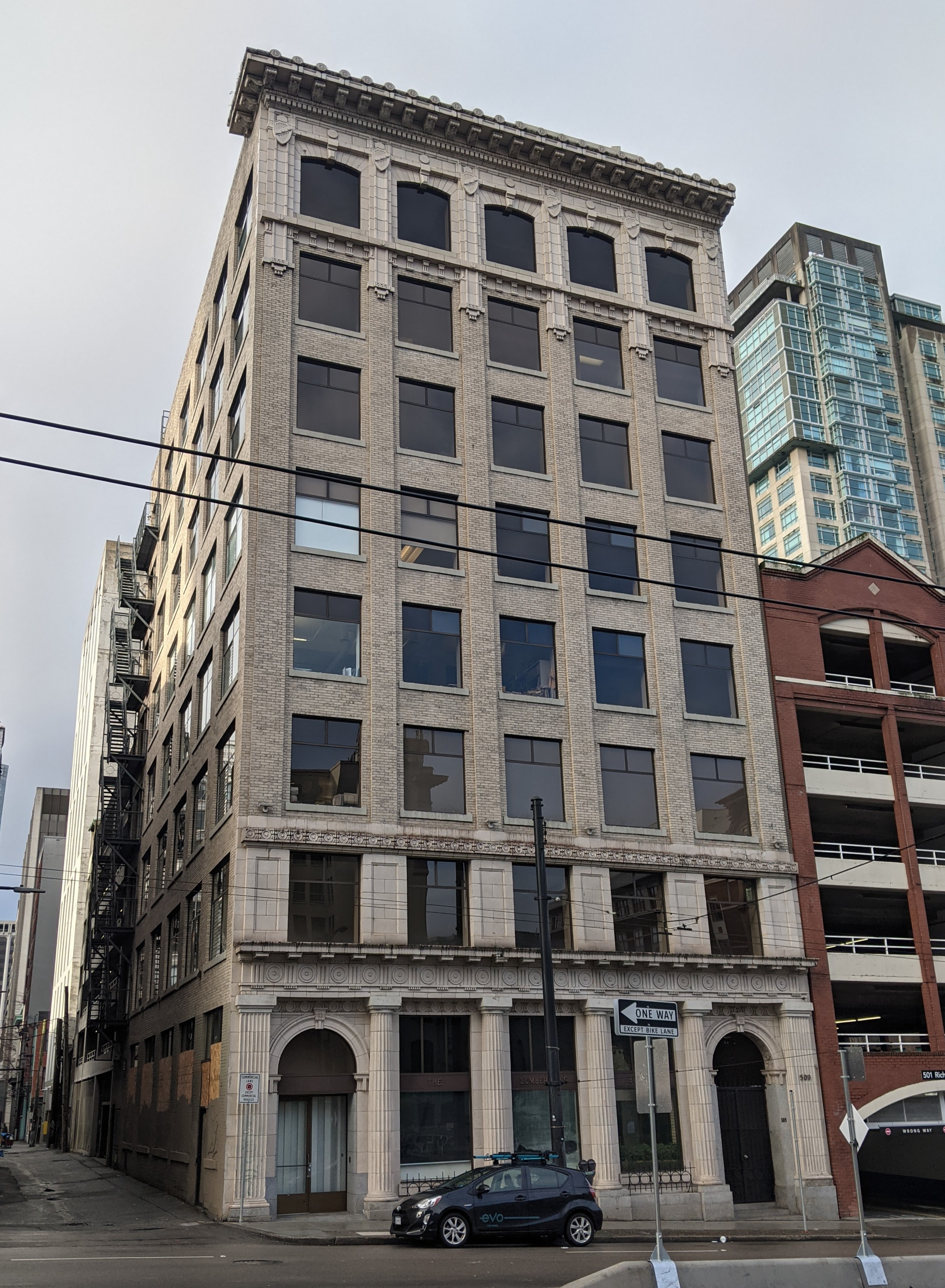
Lumbermen's Building (1911) by J. Matheson & Son

Vancouver Block (1912) by Parr and Fee

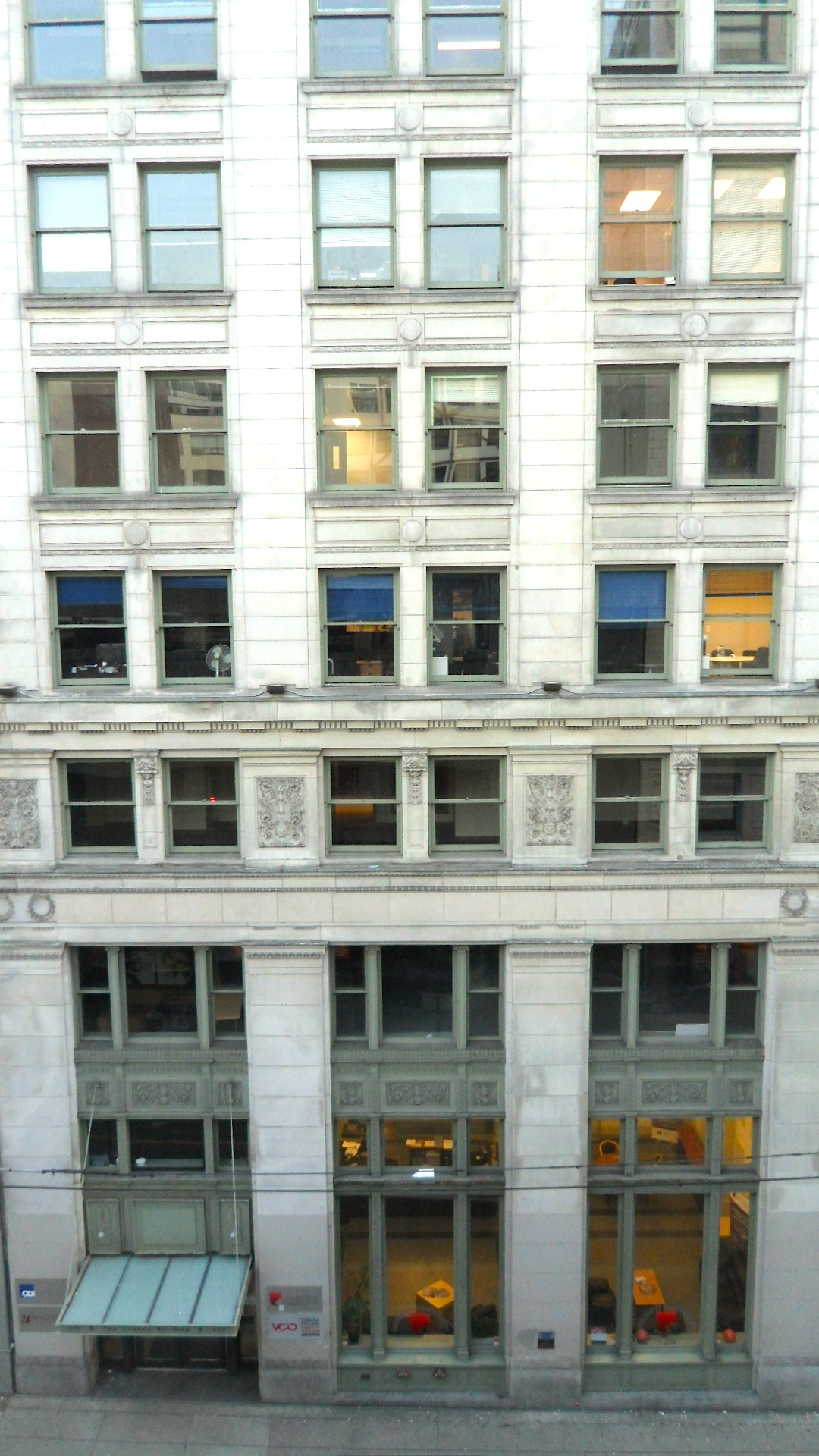
London Building (1912) by Somervell & Putnam

British Canadian Securities Building (1912) by H. S. Griffith

Seymour Building (1913) by Somervell & Putnam

Standard Building (1913) by A. J. Russell

Birks Building (1913) by Somervell & Putnam

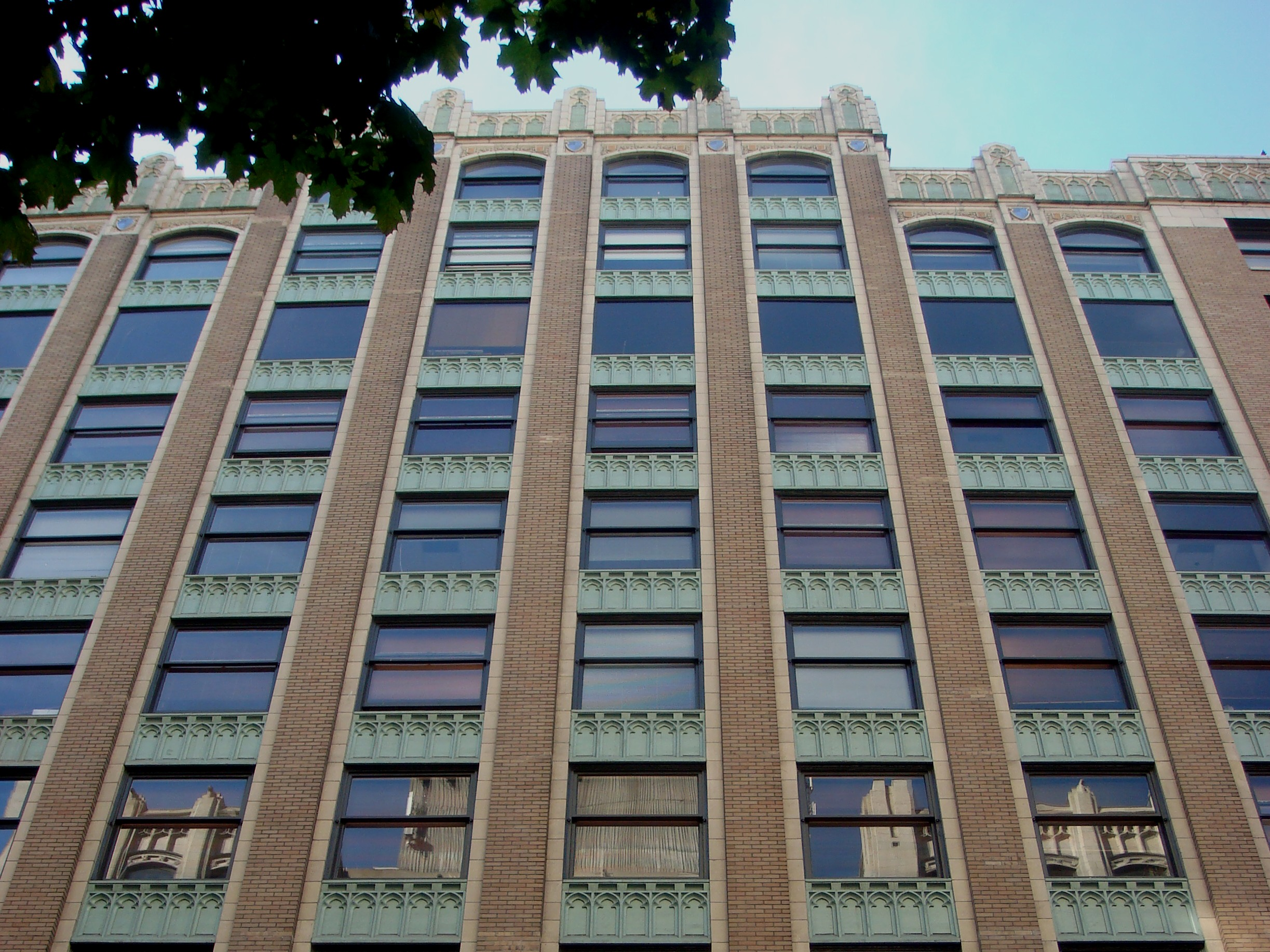
Stock Exchange Building (1928) by Townley & Matheson

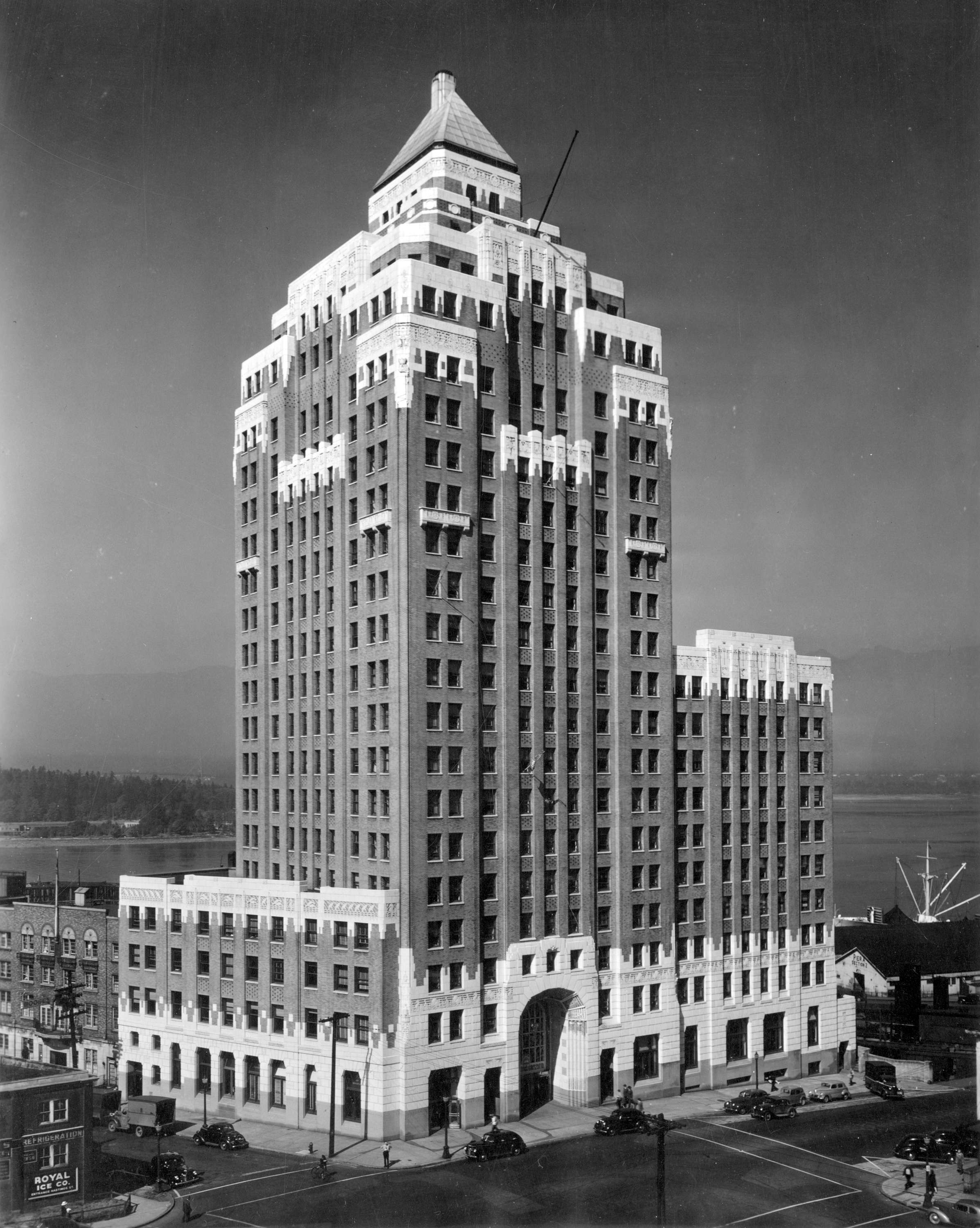
Marine Building (1930) by McCarter & Nairne

=== Mid-century offices ===
BC Electric Building (1955) by Thompson, Berwick & Pratt

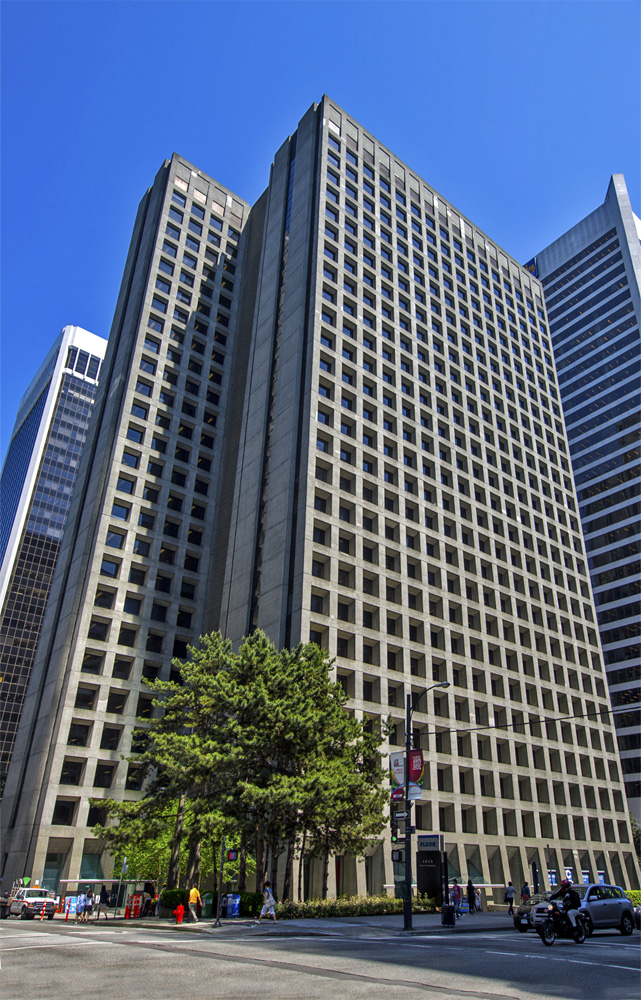
MacMillan Bloedel Building (1966) by Arthur Erickson

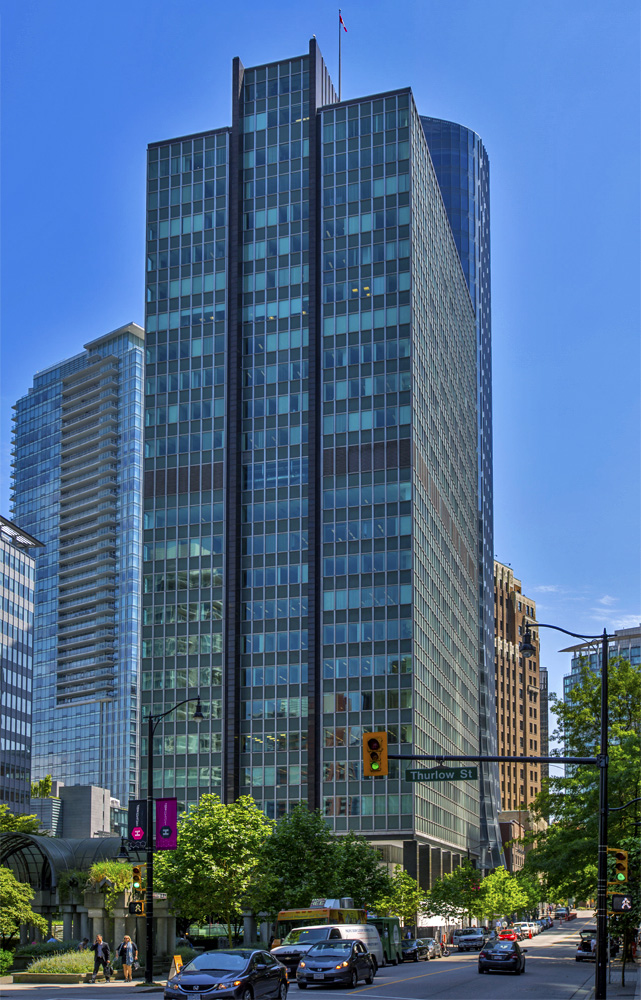
Guinness Tower (1967) by Charles Paine & Associates

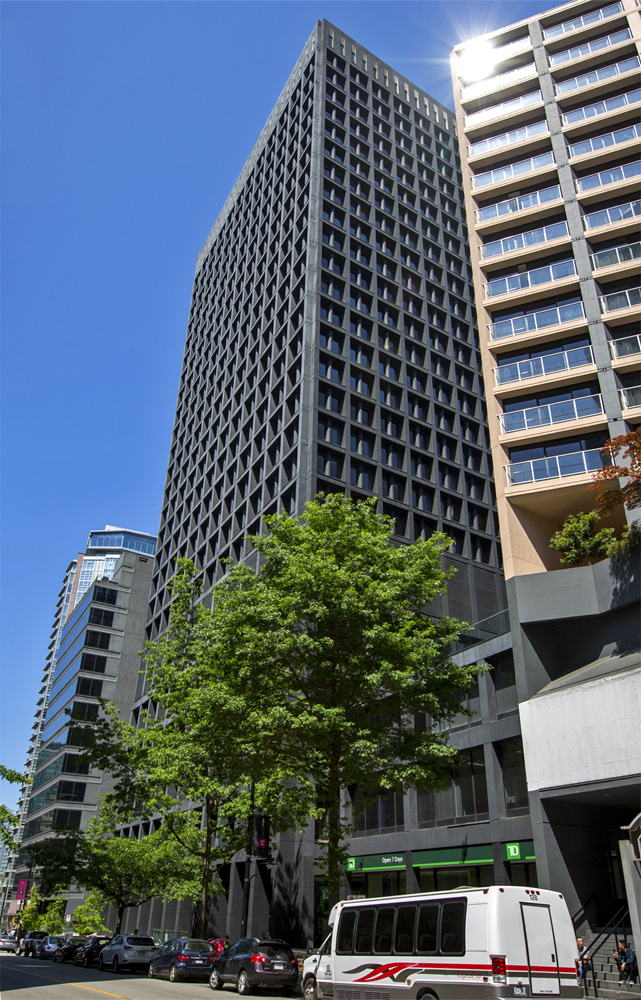
Board of Trade Building (1967) by Allan Waisman

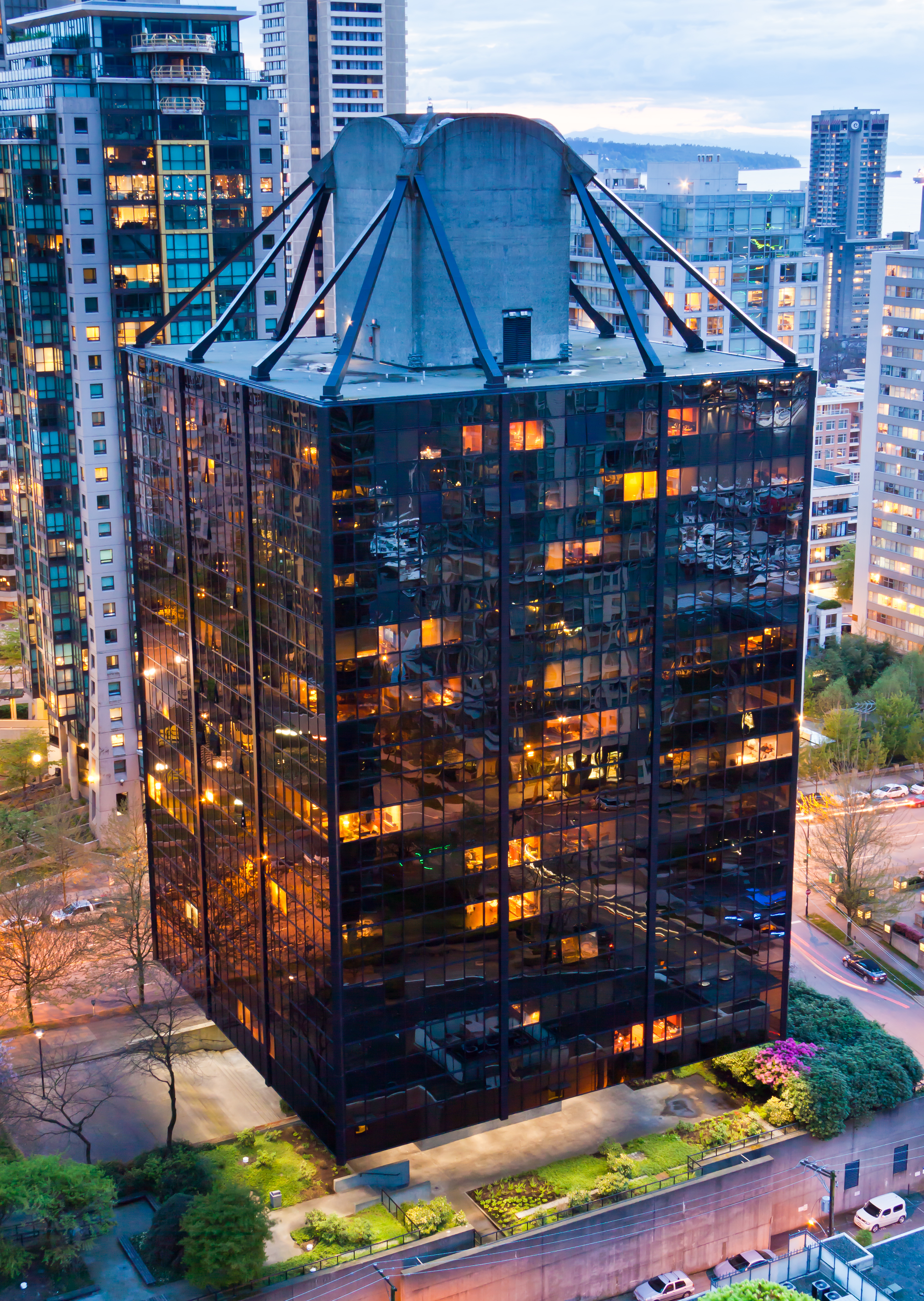
Westcoast Building (1968) by Rhone & Iredale

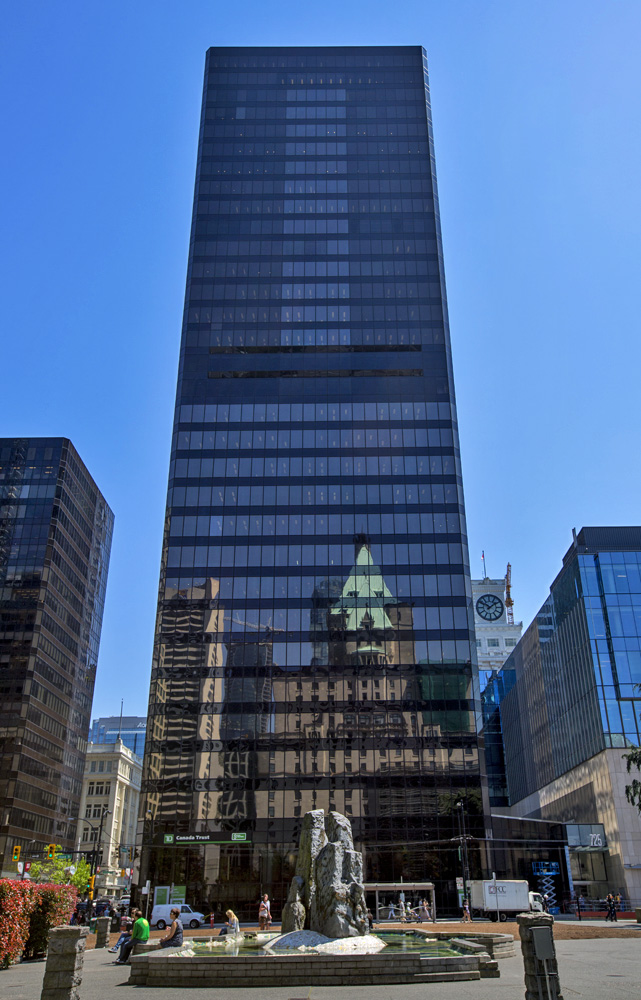
TD Tower (1970) by César Pelli

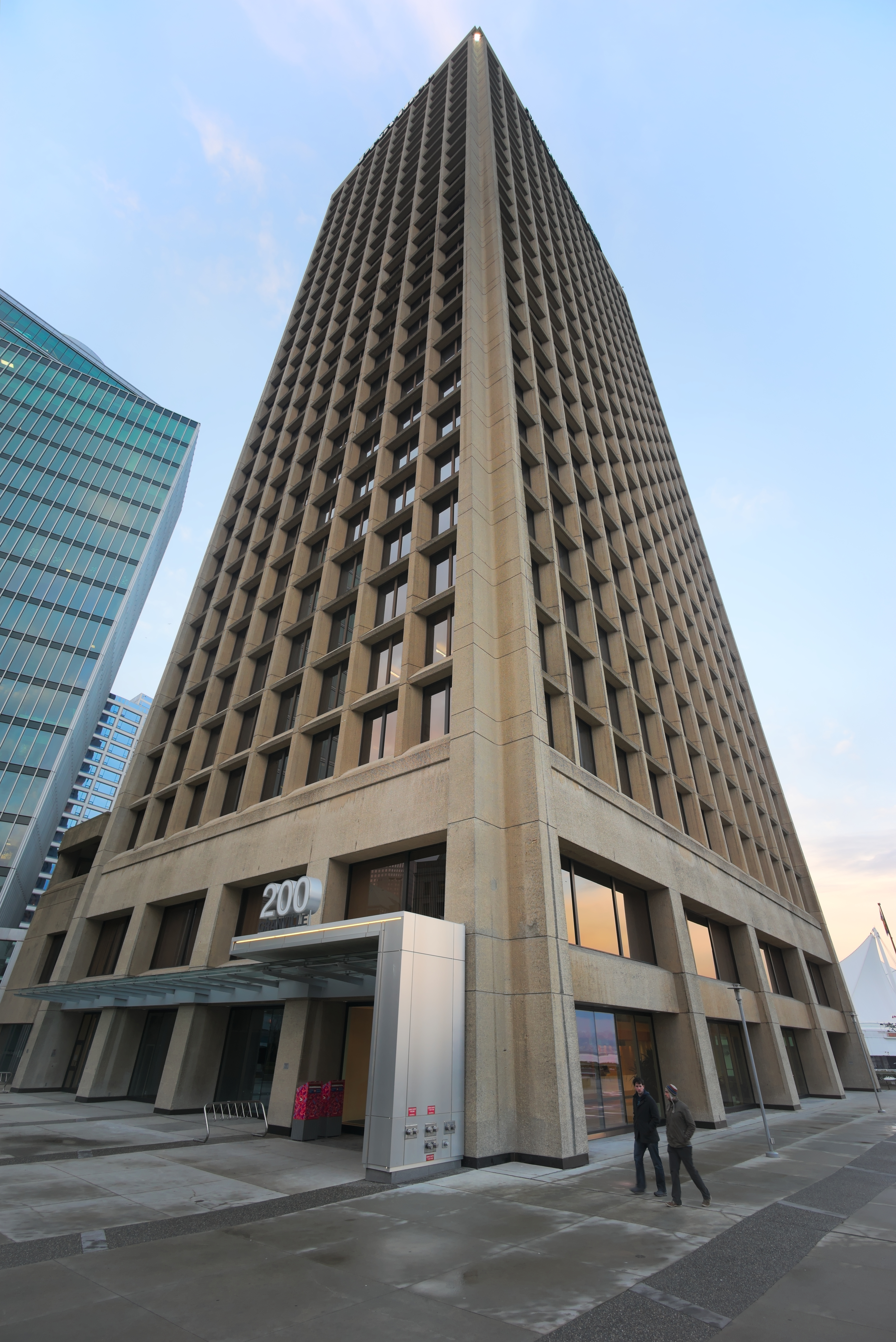
Granville Square (1971) by Francis Donaldson

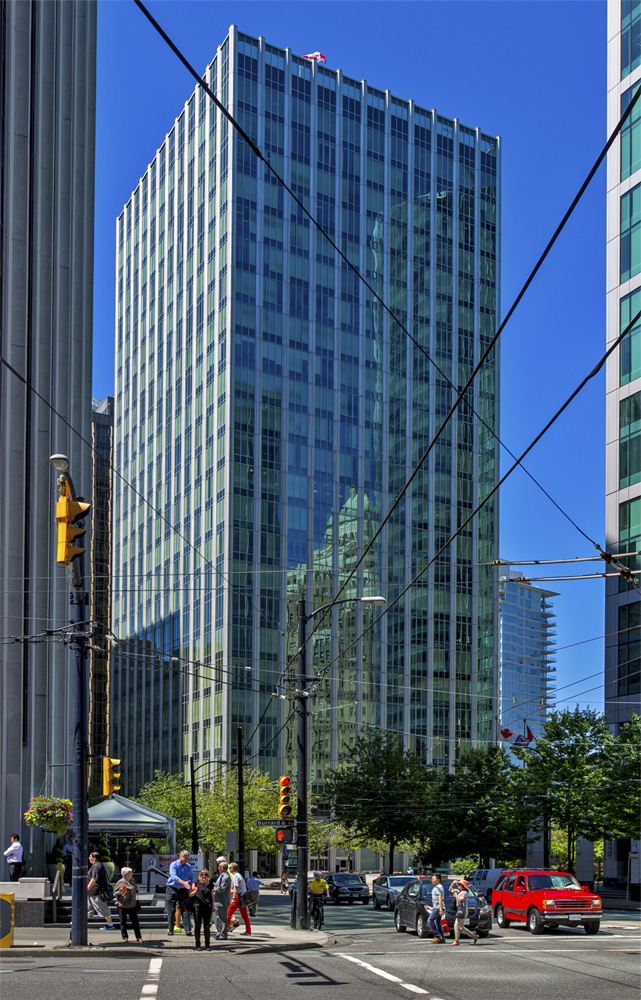
Oceanic Plaza (1975) by Charles Paine & Associates

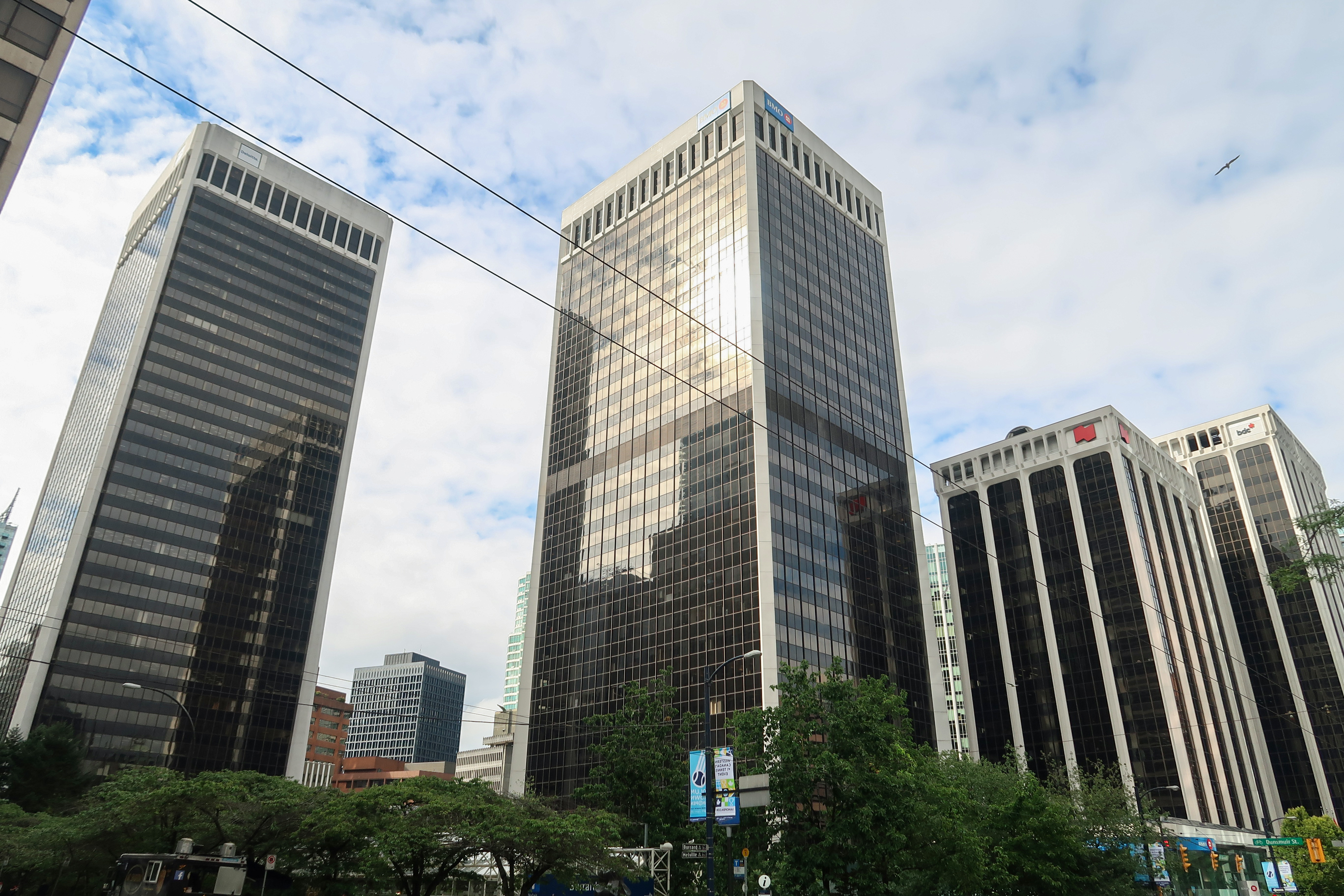
Bentall Centre (1967–81)

=== Theatres ===
Rex Theatre (1913) by Philip Morrison Jullien

Pantages Theatre (1914) by Benjamin Marcus Priteca

Capitol Theatre (1920) by Thomas W. Lamb

Allen Theatre (1920) by C. Howard Crane

Orpheum Theatre (1927) by Benjamin Marcus Priteca

Plaza Theatre (1936) by Thomas Logan Kerr

Paradise Theatre (1938) by Thomas Logan Kerr

Vogue Theatre (1941) by Kaplan & Sprachman

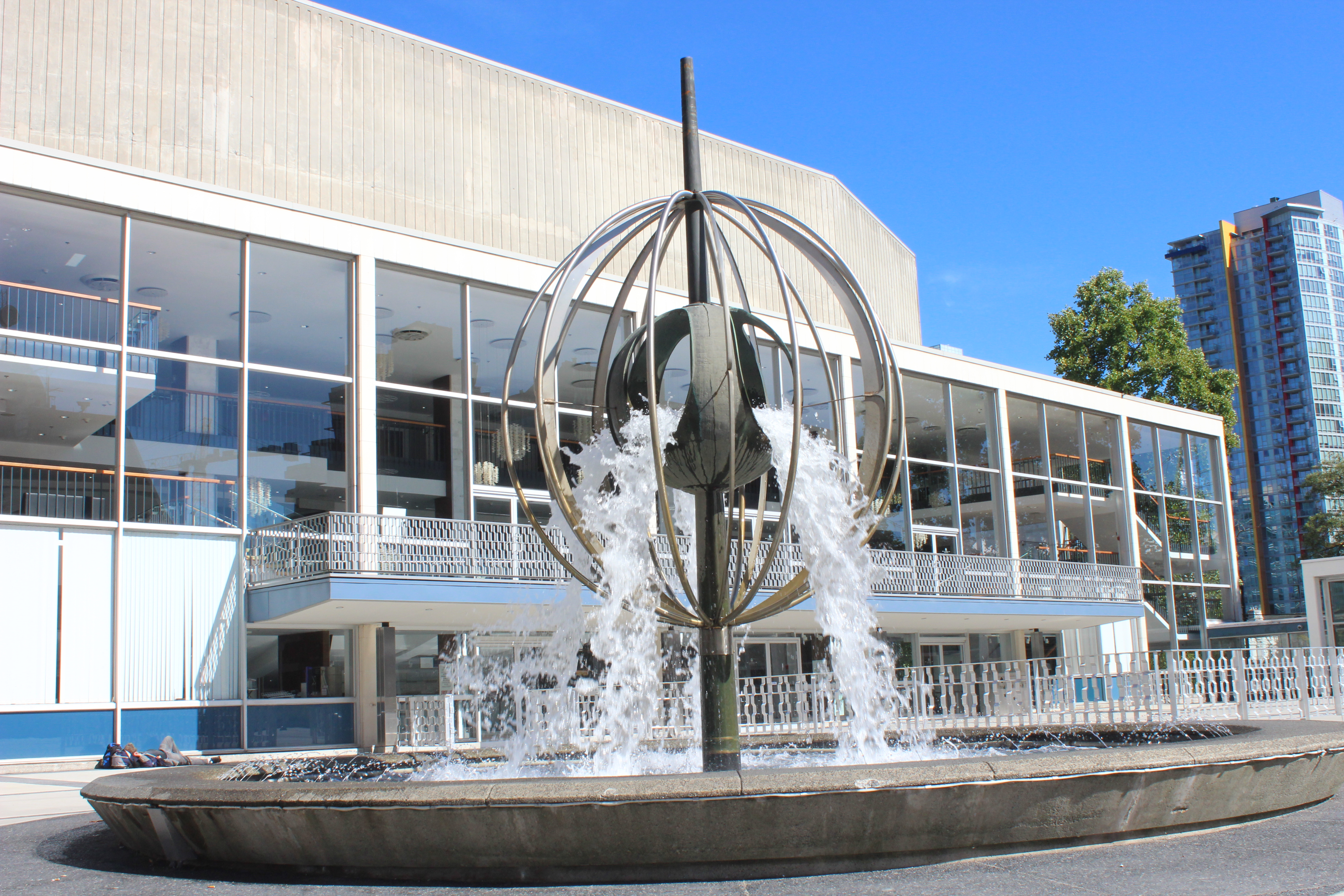
Queen Elizabeth Theatre (1959) by Arcop

== See also ==
- Architecture in Canada
- Central Heat Distribution
- List of filming locations in the Vancouver area
- List of tallest buildings in Vancouver
