= Massey Medals for Architecture =

Canadian architectural award

Massey Medals were awards in Canadian architecture that were presented from 1950 to 1970. In 1950, Vincent Massey announced a "Scheme for the Award of Massey Medals in Architecture by the Massey Foundation" with the goal of recognizing “outstanding examples of Canadian achievement in the fields of architecture and thus to give encouragement to the members of the architectural profession and to promote public interest in their work".

Working in consultation with the Royal Architectural Institute of Canada (RAIC), awards were made in 1950, 1952, 1955, 1958, 1961, 1964, 1967, and 1970. The structure of the awards varied over the years (usage of project categories, gold and silver medals, inclusion of mentions as part of the results, recognition of consultants, etc.).

As Canada’s first national architectural awards program, the Massey Medals for Architecture program is regarded as an important step in elevating public awareness of modern architecture in the nation.

Notable architects and architectural firms which received the award included:

- Arthur Erickson
- Geoffrey Massey
- John B. Parkin Associates
- Gordon Adamson
- Page & Steele
- Raymond Moriyama
- Webb Zerafa Menkes
- Fred Hollingsworth
- Barry Downs
- Thompson, Berwick & Pratt
- Affleck, Desbarats, Dimakopoulos, Lebensold, Michaud, Sise
- Moshe Safdie
- Peter Dickinson
- Eberhard Zeidler

In later year’s, criticism of the awards program’s selection of winners (with many considering mediocre projects being awarded instead of clearly superior projects) was exemplified by the November 1970 issue of The Canadian Architect whose feature article addressed this issue and cover featured an image of the award’s medal and the title, “If you failed to win this medal, turn to page 27.”

In 1982, the Governor-General’s Awards for Architecture was created to re-establish a major national architectural awards program.

== 1950 Awards ==
Published: RAIC Journal - February 1951 - Serial 306 / Vol 28 / No 2

CATEGORY	AWARD	PROJECT	LOCATION	ARCHITECT
Educational Buildings	Gold Medal	Oshawa High School	Oshawa, ON	John B. Parkin Associates
Office Buildings	Silver Medal	Architects and Medical Offices	Vancouver, BC	Gardiner and Thornton
Recreation Buildings	Silver Medal	Canadian National Exhibition Grandstand	Toronto, ON	Marani and Morris
Ecclesiastical Buildings	Silver Medal	Central Christadelphian Church	Toronto , ON	John B. Parkin Associates
Industrial Buildings	Silver Medal	Faberge Perfumes (Canada) Limited - Office and Factory	Etobicoke, ON	John B. Parkin Associates
Apartment Houses	Silver Medal	Garden Court Apartments	Toronto, ON	Page and Steele
Hospitals and Clinics	Silver Medal	Humber Memorial Hospital	Weston, ON	John B. Parkin Associates
Miscellaneous	Silver Medal	Shipshaw No. 2 Power Development	Saguenay River, QC	J.C. Meadowcroft
Commercial Buildings	Silver Medal	York Township Hydro Electric System – Office and Garage	York Township, ON	John B. Parkin Associates
Group Housing	No award			
Municipal and Government Buildings	No award			
Residences up to $15,000	No award			
Residences over $15,000	No award			
Transportation Buildings	No award			

== 1952 Awards ==
Published: RAIC Journal - January 1953 - Serial 329 / Vol 30 / No 1

CATEGORY	AWARD	PROJECT	LOCATION	ARCHITECT
Office Buildings	Gold Medal	Marwell Office Building	Vancouver, BC	Semmens & Simpson
Apartment Houses	Silver Medal	130 Old Forest Hill Road Apartment Building	Toronto, ON	Gordon S. Adamson
Ecclesiastical Buildings	Silver Medal	Knox Presbyterian Church	Goderich, ON	Philip Carter Johnson
Educational Buildings	Silver Medal	Marmora High School	Marmora, ON	Craig & Madill
Residences Costing Up To $15,000	Silver Medal	Residence of Dr. Harold Copp	Vancouver, BC	Sharp & Thompson, Berwick, Pratt
Residences Costing Over $15,000	Silver Medal	Residence of Mr. John C.H. Porter	Vancouver, BC	Davison and Porter
Commercial Buildings	Silver Medal	Tilden Drive Yourself - Rental Office	Vancouver, BC	Sharp & Thompson, Berwick, Pratt
Recreational Buildings	Silver Medal	University of British Columbia - War Memorial Gymnasium	Vancouver, BC	Sharp & Thompson, Berwick, Pratt
Municipal and Governmental Buildings	Silver Medal	York Township Municipal Offices	York Township, ON	Shore & Moffat
Group Housing other than Apartment Houses	no entry			
Hospitals and Clinics	no award			
Hotels and Restaurants	no award			
Industrial Buildings	no award			
Transportation Buildings	no award			

== 1955 Awards ==
Published: RAIC Journal - December 1955 - Serial 364 / Vol 32 / No 12

CATEGORY	AWARD	PROJECT	LOCATION	ARCHITECT
Group Housing other than Apartment Buildings	Gold Medal	Kiwanis Village	Victoria, BC	Sharp & Thompson, Berwick, Pratt and Charles E. Craig
Office Buildings	Silver Medal	B.C. Sugar Refinery, Limited	Vancouver, BC	Semmens and Simpson
Commercial Buildings	Silver Medal	Convenience Centre	Don Mills, ON	John B. Parkin Associates
Residences over $15,000	Silver Medal	Hamilton House	Peterborough, ON	Blackwell, Craig and Zeidler
Residences up to $15,000	Silver Medal	House of Mr. Gordon Smith	West Vancouver, BC	Erickson & Massey
Miscellaneous	Silver Medal	Ontario Association of Architects Offices	Toronto, ON	John B. Parkin Associates
Hotels and Restaurants	Silver Medal	Seaway Hotel	Toronto, ON	A. Elken & R.W. Becksted
Industrial Buildings	Silver Medal	Simpsons-Sears Industrial Development	Etobicoke, ON	John B. Parkin Associates
Ecclesiastical Buildings	Silver Medal	St. Anthony's Church	Agassiz, BC	Gardiner, Thornton, Gathe & Associates
Educational Buildings	Silver Medal	Toronto Teachers' College	Toronto, ON	Page & Steele
Apartment Houses	no award			
Hospitals and Clinics	no award			
Municipal and Governmental Buildings	no award			
Recreational Buildings	no award			
Transportation Buildings	no award			

== 1958 Awards ==
Published: RAIC Journal - December 1958 - Serial 400 / Vol 35 / No 12

CATEGORY	AWARD	PROJECT	LOCATION	ARCHITECT
Recreation	Gold Medal	Stratford Festival Theatre	Stratford, ON	Rormthwaite & Fairfield
Educational	Silver Medal	Beamsville Central Elementary School	Beamsville, ON	Huget, Secord & Pagani
Commercial	Silver Medal	CKWX Radio Station	Vancouver, BC	Thompson, Berwick & Pratt
Houses over 1,200 sq. ft.	Silver Medal	House in West Vancouver	West Vancouver, BC	Arthur Erickson & Geoffrey Massey
Miscellaneous	Silver Medal	Hog's Back Structures	Ottawa, ON	Hart Massey
Industrial	Silver Medal	Ortho Pharmaceutical Corporation (Canada) Limited Factory	Don Mills, ON	John B. Parkin Associates
Municipal	Silver Medal	Ottawa City Hall	Ottawa, ON	Rother, Bland & Trudeau
Group Housing	Silver Medal	South Hill Village	Don Mills, ON	James A. Murray & Henry Fliess
Hospitals	Silver Medal	Workmen's Compensation Board Hospital & Rehabilitation Centre	Downsview, ON	Page & Steele and Thomas R. Wiley
Apartment Houses	no award			
Ecclesiastical	no award			
Hotels	no award			
Houses under 1200 sq. ft.	no award			
Offices	no award			
Transportation	no award			
	Mention	Airport Terminal	Calgary, AB	Clayton, Bond & Mogridge
	Mention	B.C. Electric Building	Vancouver, BC	Thompson, Berwick & Pratt
	Mention	Bank of Nova Scotia / Bank of Montreal - Branches	Don Mills, ON	John B. Parkin Associates
	Mention	Blackwoods Beverages Bottling Plant	Winnipeg, MB	Waisman, Ross & Associates
	Mention	Construction Equipment Ltd.	Vancouver, BC	Thompson, Berwick & Pratt
	Mention	Dining Lodge	Dill Township, ON	Fabbro & Townend
	Mention	Federal Building	Don Mills, ON	John B. Parkin Associates
	Mention	Georgian Manor, Home for the Aged	Penetanguishene, ON	Craig and Zeidler
	Mention	Hirshhorn Residence	Bootlegger's Bay, ON	John B. Parkin Associates
	Mention	Holt Renfrew Building	Toronto, ON	Gordon S. Adamson & Associates
	Mention	Langley Centennial Museum	Langley, BC	J. Calder Peeps
	Mention	Mandarin Gardens Motel	Sudbury, ON	Fabbro & Townend
	Mention	Manitoba Teachers' Society Headquarters	Winnipeg, MB	Libling, Michener & Associates
	Mention	New Woodbine Racetrack	Etobicoke, ON	Earle C. Morgan
	Mention	Norman MacKenzie Art Gallery – Addition	Regina, SK	lzumi, Arnott & Sugyama
	Mention	North York Municipal Offices	Willowdale, ON	Sproatt & Rolph
	Mention	Pacific Great Eastern Railway Station	Squamish, BC	R. C. Hale & R. F. Harrison
	Mention	Peterborough Community Centre	Peterborough, ON	Craig and Zeidler
	Mention	Plastic Cabana	Vancouver, BC	Arthur Erickson
	Mention	R. Laidlaw Lumber Company Limited	Weston, ON	Pentland & Baker
	Mention	Rideau Towers	Calgary, AB	Peter Caspari and C. M. Bakker
	Mention	Sarnia & District High School	Sarnia, ON	John B. Parkin Associates
	Mention	Shaw Cottage	Muskoka, ON	Eugene Z. Lilitzak
	Mention	St. Augustine's School and Parish Hall	Brandon, MB	Waisman, Ross & Associates
	Mention	St. John Brebeuf	Winnipeg, MB	Libling, Michener & Associates
	Mention	Stanrock Uranium Mines - Group Housing	Blind River, ON	Jerome Markson
	Mention	Steinbergs Store	Montreal, QC	Keith L. Graham Associates
	Mention	Summer House on Vancouver Island	Vancouver Island, BC	Watkins & Massey
	Mention	Tache Primary School	Winnipeg, MB	Libling, Michener & Associates
	Mention	Toronto Parking Authority - Dundas Square Parking Garage	Toronto, ON	John B. Parkin Associates
	Mention	University of British Columbia - Arts Building	Vancouver, BC	Thompson, Berwick & Pratt
	Mention	University of British Columbia - St. Mark's Residential College	Vancouver, BC	Gardiner, Thornton, Gathe & Associates
	Mention	W.H. Collins, Community Centre	Elliot Lake, ON	John B. Parkin Associates
	Mention	Warren Grade School	Winnipeg, MB	Libling, Michener & Associates

== 1961 Awards ==
Published: RAIC Journal - November 1961 - Serial 435 / Vol 38 / No 11

AWARD	PROJECT	LOCATION	ARCHITECT
Gold Medal	University of British Columbia - Thea Koerner House	Vancouver, BC	Thompson, Berwick & Pratt
Silver Medal	Bell Telephone Company of Canada	Pickering-Ajax, ON	Gordon S. Adamson & Associates
Silver Medal	Chapel St Louis Le Roi	St Boniface, MB	Libling, Michener and Associates
Silver Medal	Eglise St-Raphael	Jonquiere, QC	St Gelais and Tremblay
Silver Medal	Executive House Apartments	Winnipeg, MB	Libling, Michener and Associates
Silver Medal	Imperial Oil Limited Research Building	Sarnia, ON	Shore and Moffat
Silver Medal	Kipling Collegiate Institute	Etobicoke, ON	Gordon Adamson and Associates
Silver Medal	Lapierre Residence	St Catharines, ON	James E. Secord and Saul Herzog
Silver Medal	Moose Jaw Civic Centre	Moose Jaw, SK	Joseph Pettick
Silver Medal	Niagara Parks Commission Foot Bridge	Niagara-on-the-Lake, ON	Huget and Secord
Silver Medal	Parkwood Terrace	South Burnaby, BC	Hale, Harrison, Buzzelle
Silver Medal	Private Golf Course	Toronto, ON	Raymond Moriyama and Associates
Silver Medal	Regent Park South High-Rise Apartments	Toronto, ON	Page and Steele
Silver Medal	Richmond Hill Public Library	Richmond Hill, ON	Philip R. Brook
Silver Medal	Rockland Shopping Centre	Town of Mount Royal, QC	Ian Martin and Victor Prus
Silver Medal	Summer Residence	Husavick, MB	Waisman, Ross and Associates
Silver Medal	Thompson Municipal Offices	Thompson, MB	Waisman, Ross and Associates
Silver Medal	Town of Mount Royal Post Office	Town of Mount Royal, QC	Jean Michaud and R. T. Affleck of Affleck, Desbarats, Dimakopoulos, Lebensold, Michaud, Sise
Silver Medal	University of British Columbia - Commons Block	Vancouver, BC	Thompson, Berwick & Pratt
Silver Medal	Winnipeg Hydro-Electric System Sub-Station No. 21	Winnipeg, MB	Libling, Michener and Associates
Mention	CIBA Building	Dorval, QC	Percy Booth
Mention	Four Seasons Motel	Toronto, ON	Peter Dickinson and Associates
Mention	John Meyer House	West Vancouver, BC	Wensley and Rand
Mention	Salle Desjeunesses musicales Du Canada	Mont Orford, QC	Desgagne and Cote
Mention	Willmington Park Community Centre	North York, ON	Jack Klein and Henry Sears

== 1964 Awards ==
Published: RAIC Journal - November 1964 - Serial 470 / Vol 41 / No 11

AWARD	PROJECT	LOCATION	ARCHITECT
Silver Medal	Bowring Park Footbridge	St John’s, NL	Blanche van Ginkel
Silver Medal	C.G. Brown Memorial Pool	Burnaby, BC	McCarter, Nairne & Partners
Silver Medal	Central Technical School Art Centre	Toronto, ON	Fairfield & DuBois
Silver Medal	Church of St Gerard Majella	St Jean, QC.	Affleck, Desbarats, Dimakopoulos, Lebensold, Sise
Silver Medal	Country Residence	Bowen Island, BC	Ian Davidson
Silver Medal	Don Valley Woods - Phase 1	North York, ON	Jack Klein & Henry Sears
Silver Medal	Forrest Residence	West Vancouver, BC	Thompson, Berwick, Pratt & Partners
Silver Medal	Group Health Centre	Sault Ste. Marie, ON	Jerome Markson
Silver Medal	Hart Massey Residence	Rockcliffe, ON	Hart Massey
Silver Medal	Imperial Oil Limited Ontario Regional Headquarters	Don Mills, ON	John B. Parkin Associates
Silver Medal	John Grinnell Residence	West Vancouver, BC	Thompson, Berwick, Pratt & Partners
Silver Medal	Lothian Mews	Toronto, ON	Webb Zerafa Menkes
Silver Medal	Maltby Residence	West Vancouver, BC	Fred Thornton Hollingsworth
Silver Medal	McGill University Laboratories & Dormitories	Mont St-Hilaire, QC	LeMoyne, Edwards, Shine and Charles Elliott Trudeau
Silver Medal	Rayer Residence	West Vancouver, BC	Fred Hollingsworth and Barry Vance Downs
Silver Medal	St Paul's College High School	Tuxedo, MB	Libling, Michener & Associates
Silver Medal	Thomas J. Lipton Ltd	Bramalea, ON	John B. Parkin Associates
Silver Medal	Toronto International Airport Control Tower	Malton, ON	John B. Parkin Associates; W. A. Ramsey, Chief Architect, Air Services, Government of Canada

== 1967 Awards ==
Published: RAIC Journal (Architecture Canada) - June 1967 - Serial 501 / Vol 44 / No 6

AWARD	PROJECT	LOCATION	ARCHITECT
Medal	1965 Tokyo International Trade Fair - Canadian Pavilion	Tokyo, Japan	Erickson/Massey
Medal	Ceterg Office Building	Don Mills, ON	Fairfield and DuBois
Medal	Confederation Centre	Charlottetown, PE	Affleck Desbarats Dimakopoulos Lebensold Sise
Medal	Dominion Astrophysical Observatory - 16" Telescope Housing	Victoria, BC	Roger Kemble (as consultant to Chief Architect Department of Public Works, Ottawa)
Medal	Don Valley Woods - Phase Two	North York, ON	Klein and Sears
Medal	Etobicoke Public Library - Richview Branch	Etobicoke, ON	Dunlop, Wardell, Matsui, Aitken
Medal	Expo 67 - Administration & News Pavilion	Montreal. QC	Irving Grossman
Medal	Expo 67 - Habitat 67 - Phase 1	Montreal, QC	Moshe Safdie & David, Barott, Boulva
Medal	Frank B. Mayrs House	Lucerne (South Hull), QC	Barry Leonard Padolsky
Medal	G.E. Melchin and H. Melchin Summer Homes	Windermere, BC	Gordon L. Atkins
Medal	Grant Sine Public School	Cobourg, ON	Craig, Zeidler & Strong
Medal	Mimico Centennial Library	Mimico, ON	Banz-Brook-Carruthers-Grierson-Shaw
Medal	Ottawa Station	Ottawa, ON	John B. Parkin Associates, Architects and Engineers
Medal	Peel Subway Station	Montreal, QC	Papineau, Gerin- Lajoie, Le Blanc
Medal	Pickering Municipal Building	Pickering, ON	Craig, Zeidler & Strong
Medal	Place Victoria - Stock Exchange Tower	Montreal, QC	Greenspoon, Freedlander, Dunne and Luigi Moretti
Medal	Residence Des Missionnaires de Ia Consolata	Cap Rouge, QC	Jean-Marie Roy
Medal	Simon Fraser University	Burnaby, BC	Erickson/Massey / Rhone & Iredale / Zoltan Kiss / Robert F. Harrison & Associates / McNab, Lee and Logan
Medal	Smith Residence	West Vancouver, BC	Erickson/Massey
Medal	St Mark's Shop	Lumsden, SK	Clifford Wiens
Medal	Toronto International Airport - Automotive Service Centre	Malton, ON	John B. Parkin Associates, Architects and Engineers
Medal	University of Montreal - Girls' Residence	Montreal. QC	Papineau, Gerin- Lajoie, Le Blanc
Medal	University of Toronto - Scarborough College	Scarborough, ON	Page & Steele and John Andrews
Medal	Upper Canada College - Stephen House	Norval, ON	C. Blakeway Millar
Medal	Wayland Drew House	Port Perry, ON	Carmen Corneil
Special Medal	Montreal Metro	Montreal, QC	

== 1970 Awards ==
Published: RAIC Architecture Canada - October 12, 1970 - Serial 545 / Vol 47

AWARD	PROJECT	LOCATION	ARCHITECT
Medal	Canyon Manor	North Vancouver, BC	Wilfred D. Buttjes & Associates
Medal	MacMillan Bloedel Building	Vancouver, BC	Erickson/Massey Architects and Planners and Francis Donaldson
Medal	Coronation Swimming Pool	Edmonton, AB	Peter Hemingway / Consulting architect: G. Beatson
Medal	Stanley Building	Edmonton, AB	Peter Hemingway
Medal	Sitton Chapel	Sitton, SK	Clifford Wiens
Medal	National Arts Centre	Ottawa, ON	Chief architect: Department of Public Works / Consulting architects: Affleck Desbarats Dimakopoulos Lebensold Sise
Medal	Shell Canada Ltd. Research Centre	Oakville, ON	Shore & Moffat and Partners
Medal	Chalet de Ski	Mont Ste-Anne, QC	Gauthier, Guite & Jean-Marie Roy
Medal	Ilots St-Martin, La Petite Bourgogne	Montreal, QC	Jean Ouellet / Associate architects: Ouellet, Reeves, Alain
Medal	Westmount Square	Westmount, QC	Greenspoon Freedlander Plachta & Kryton / Consulting architect: Mies Van Der Rohe
Medal	Place Bonaventure	Montreal, QC	Affleck Desbarats Dimakopoulos Lebensold Sise
Medal	Saidye Bronfman Cultural Centre of the YM-YWHA	Montreal, QC	Webb, Zerafa, Menkes
Medal	Expo 67 - Man in the Community and Man and His Health Theme Pavilion	Montreal, QC	Erickson/Massey Architects and Planners
Medal	Expo 67 - Quebec Pavilion	Montreal, QC	Papineau Gérin-Lajoie Le Blanc & Luc Durand / Exhibition Design: Gustave Maeder
Medal	Universite de Montreal - Garage Louis-Colin	Montreal, QC	Jean Ouellet / Associated architects: Ouellet, Reeves, Alain
