= BC Electric Building =

Coordinates: 49.281135°N 123.125233°W

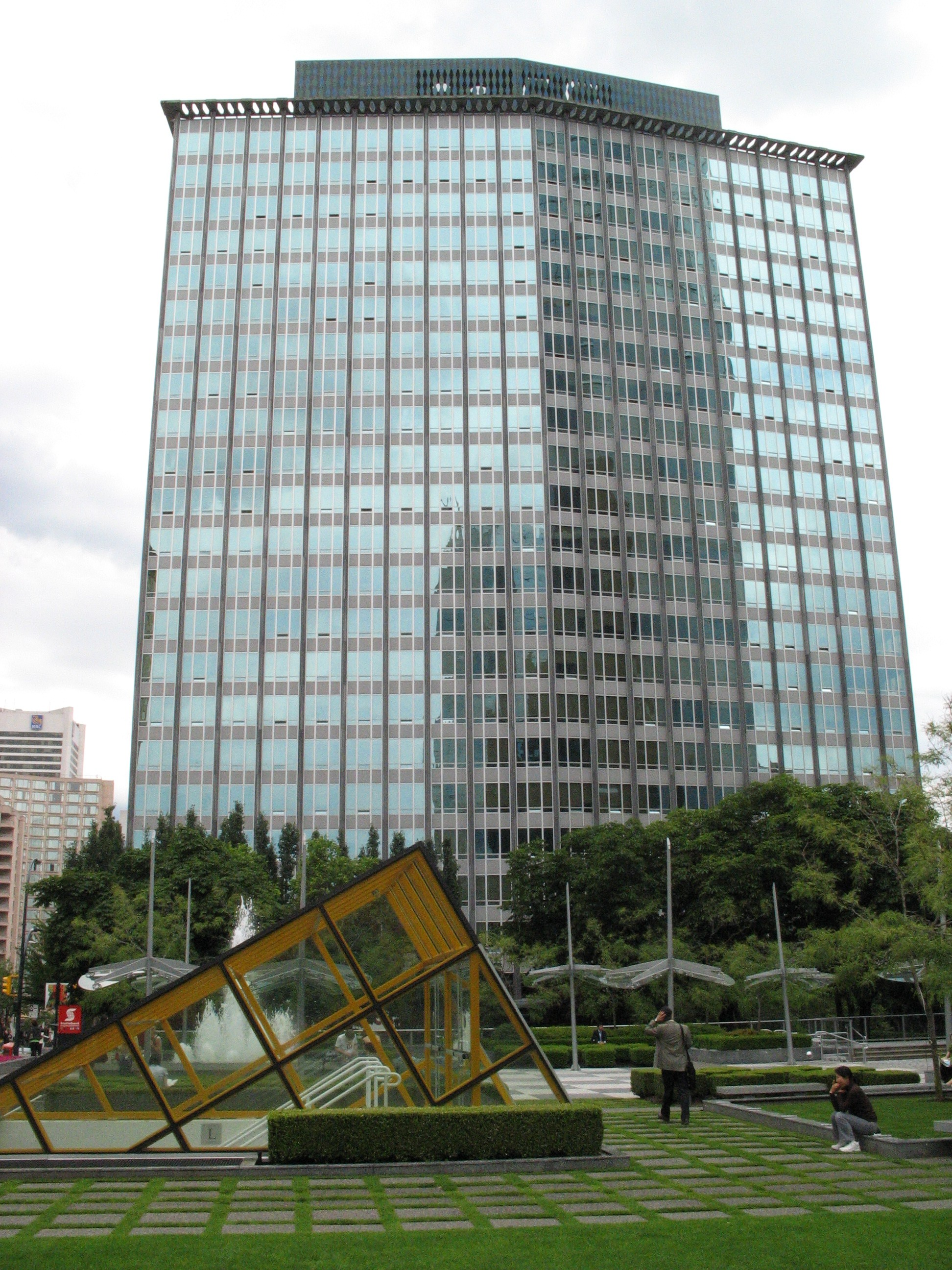

General information
- Location: 970 Burrard Street, Vancouver, British Columbia
- Groundbreaking: July 1955
- Opened: 28 March 1957

Technical details
- Floor count: 22

Design and construction
- Architecture firm: Thompson Berwick & Pratt

Website
- theelectra.ca

The BC Electric Building is a 22-storey office tower in Vancouver, British Columbia. The building was constructed as the headquarters of the BC Electric Company and was designed by Thompson Berwick & Pratt. The project's design architect was Ron Thom. In 1995, the building was converted from offices to residences and renamed the Electra.

== History ==
The structure was built by John Laing & Sons in 1957 as the new headquarters for the BC Electric Company, under its president Dal Grauer. A few days after Grauer's death in 1961, it became part of a new provincial crown corporation named BC Hydro. The 22-storey, 89-metre (292 ft) building's commission was arranged by Charles Edward "Ned" Pratt.

At the time, it was claimed to be the tallest office building in the Commonwealth, although this was not true. After BC Hydro moved to new offices in Vancouver and Burnaby in the late 1990s, the building was sold, and in 1998, was renovated and converted primarily into residential condo space, although BC Hydro continues to operate the Dal Grauer Substation, whose space is integral with Electra.

While BC Electric's offices were in the building, ten large air horns on top of the structure played the first four notes of O Canada at noon every day. The horns have since been moved to the Pan Pacific Vancouver roof. They are owned and managed by Canada Place.

== See also ==
- List of tallest buildings in Vancouver

== Sources ==
- Ritchie, Berry (1997). The Good Builder: The John Laing Story. James & James.
