= Charles Edward Pratt =

Canadian rower and architect (1911–1996)

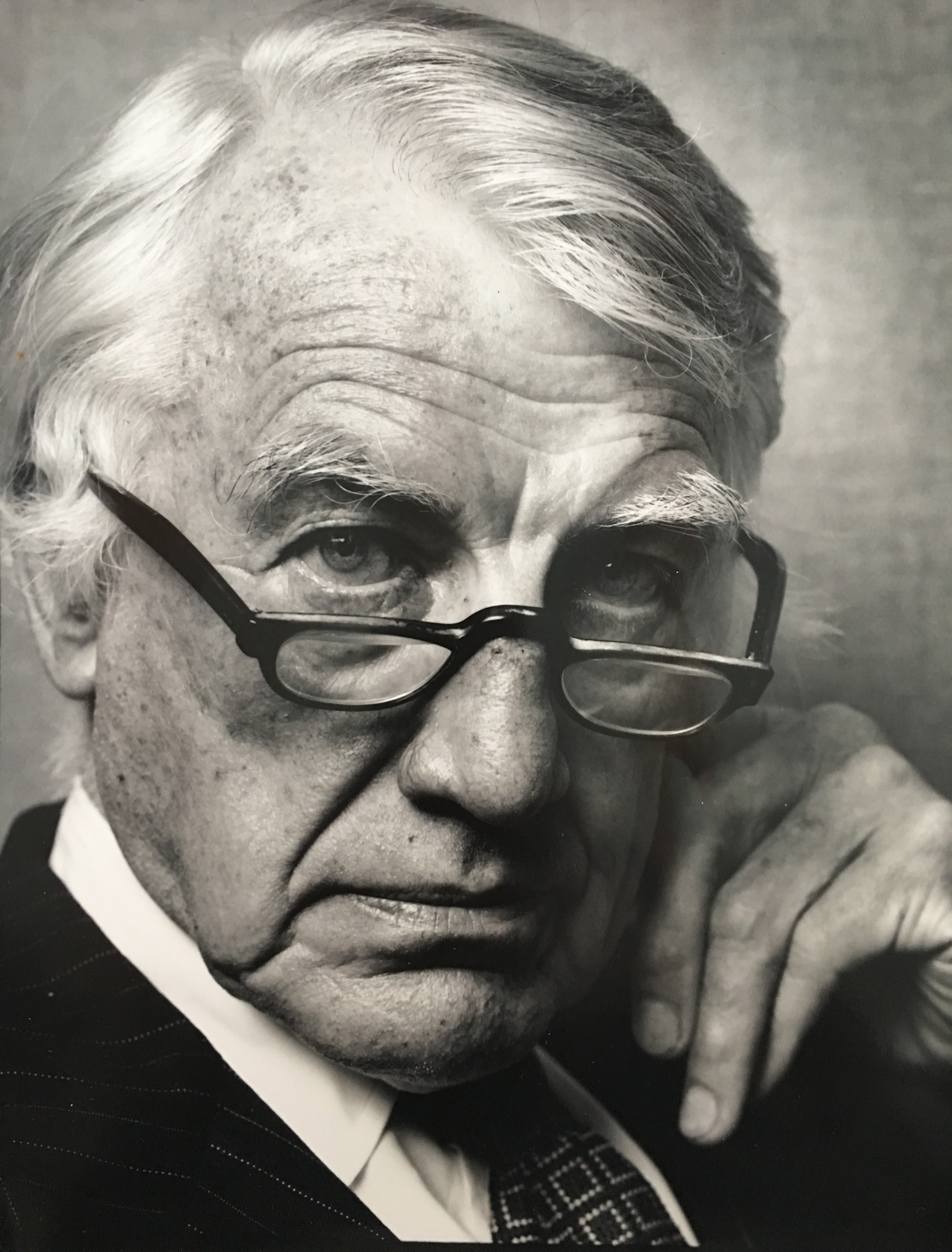
Charles Ned Pratt

Charles Edward "Ned" Pratt FRAIC (15 July 1911 – 24 February 1996) was an American-Canadian oarsman and architect. Pratt competed in the 1932 Summer Olympics in Los Angeles where he won a bronze medal in double sculls. In 1939 he joined the Vancouver architectural firm Sharp and Thompson, where he remained for the duration of his career. During his career he played an important role in bringing modern architecture to the Canadian west coast.

== Early life and Olympics ==
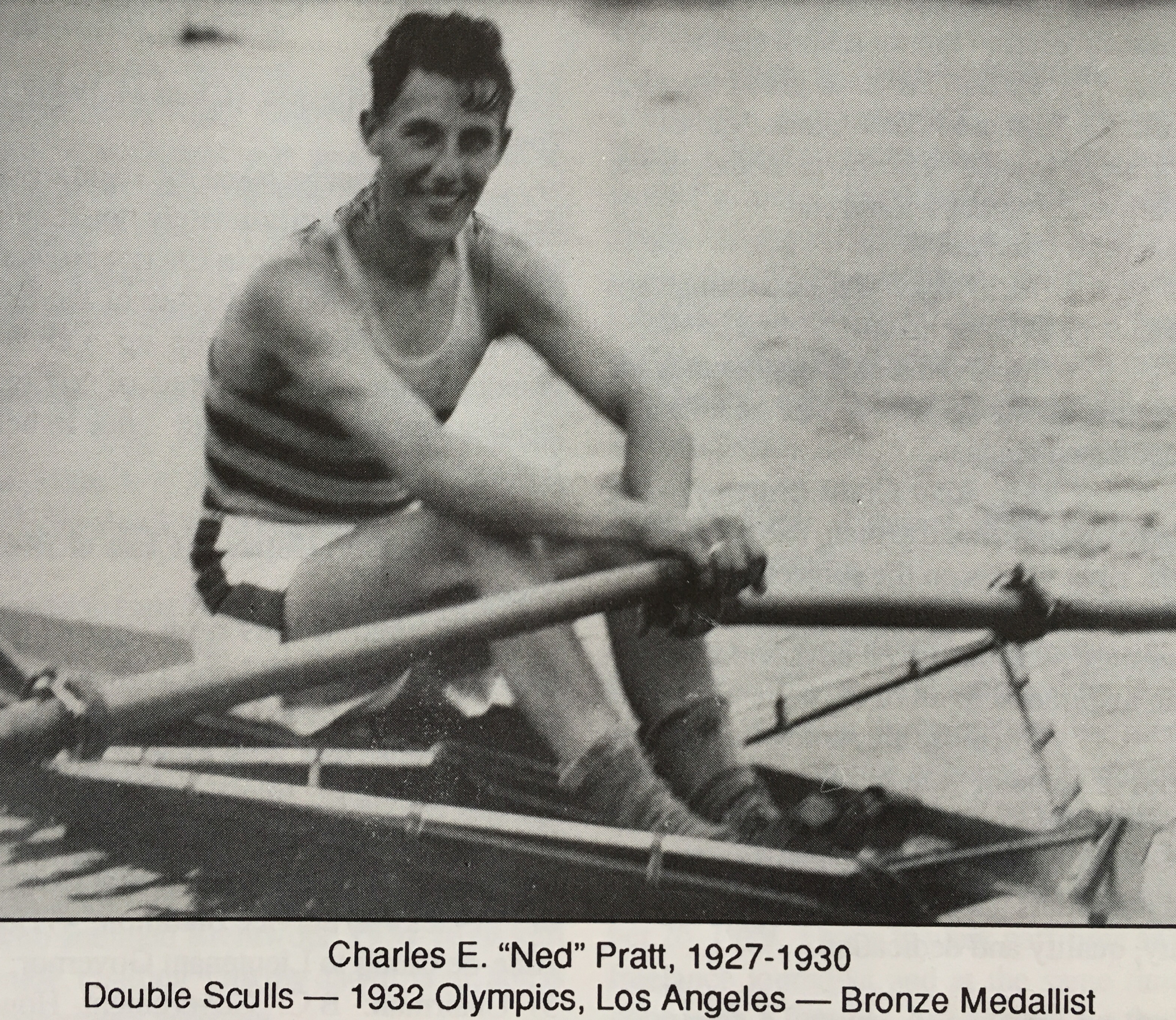
Pratt training in 1927

Pratt was born in Boston, Massachusetts, and moved to Vancouver, Canada in 1921, at the age of 10. He attended the University of British Columbia from 1930-1933 and participated in the 1932 Summer Olympics Men's Double Sculls in Los Angeles, with Noël de Mille. The pair won a bronze medal for Canada. In 1980, his Double Sculls partnership was inducted into the British Columbia Sports Hall of Fame.

== Career ==
Pratt studied architecture at the University of Toronto, graduating in 1938. In 1939, Pratt joined the firm Sharp and Thompson, became a principal in 1945, and transformed the firm Sharp and Thompson, Berwick and Pratt and Partners into the largest and most active architectural firm in western Canada. The primary architectural approach of the firm, and of Vancouver as a whole, was to imitate the traditional Beaux-Arts architecture of 19th-century Europe, but Pratt became an influential proponent of the relatively new clean-lined International Style of 20th-century architecture. In 1949, he incorporated an architectural manifesto for future West Coast homes into a high-profile exhibition at the Vancouver Art Gallery entitled "Design for Living." His design of his own 1951 home in West Vancouver adhered to his manifesto and was one of the first post-and-beam structures to use floor-to-ceiling windows, a form he popularized on the West Coast. In 1952, his Tilden Drive Yourself Office, whose floor-to-ceiling sheer glass and exposed steel framework were radical for downtown Vancouver at the time, won a Massey Silver Medal.

Pratt designed the 1954 Dal Grauer Substation, which became the first modernist building in the Vancouver's West End, and, in collaboration with artist B.C. Binning, devised a Mondrian-inspired grid of colours behind its transparent glazed facade for the benefit of passers-by. He then gained national fame as the partner-in-charge of the British Columbia Electric Company head office in downtown Vancouver, which upon its completion in 1957 was the second high-rise built in Vancouver, and the first since 1931. For this project, he again collaborated with Binning, who devised a porcelain mosaic exterior wall whose colours referenced the natural beauty and climate of Vancouver (green for the forest, blue for the surrounding ocean, black for the mountains and frequent dark skies).

Pratt helped shape the careers of renowned architects Ronald Thom, Fred Hollingsworth and Barry Vance Downs and steered them and others towards a more rationalist and pragmatic design approach. He was highly active in the national design and beyond, serving alongside Eero Saarinen, Ernesto Nathan Rogers, Eric Arthur, Sir William Holford and Gordon Stephenson as a juror on the 1958 Toronto City Hall international design competition, and championing the eventual winner, architect Viljo Revell.

In 1968, Pratt was appointed to a federal housing task force of six people led by Transport Minister Paul Hellyer. The task force organized 25 public hearings in cities and towns across the country, beginning in Ottawa, to researching and report on inner-city traffic congestion, urban transit options, housing shortages. The committee was asked to come up with recommendations for financing costs, urban planning, and building techniques to improve the housing situation across Canada.

== Personal life ==
Pratt moved from Vancouver to Toronto in 1933 to study engineering at the University of Toronto, but his classmate and future partner Robert Berwick convinced him to switch to architecture. He married Catherine Gordon Lang in 1937, and the couple had two children: Peter Whitney Pratt and Antoinette Lang Pratt. He later lived with Dorothy Jane (DJ) Boyce until his death in a traffic accident on February 24, 1996. DJ was critically injured but survived. During World War II, he served in the Royal Air Force from 1942-45.

== Works ==
- 1946: Pratt House, West Vancouver,
- 1947: Saba House, Vancouver
- 1948: Ridgeview Elementary School, West Vancouver
- 1949: Craighead House, Vancouver
- 1949: Vancouver Vocational Institute
- 1950: Tilden Drive-Yourself Office, Vancouver (Massey Silver Medal; demolished 1972)
- 1951: Pratt House, West Vancouver
- 1952: War Memorial Gymnasium, University of British Columbia, Vancouver
- 1954: Dal Grauer Substation, Vancouver
- 1955: B.C. Electric Building, Victoria
- 1957: B.C. Electric Building, Vancouver
- 1961: Thea Koerner House (Graduate Student Centre), University of British Columbia, Vancouver
- 1973: Reynolds' Residence, Port Coquitlam
