= Edmund T. Parkin =

Canadian architect (1912–1994)

- Born: Edmund Thornton Parkin; 1912; Toronto, Ontario, Canada
- Died: 1 August 1994 (age 81)
- Education: Ontario Agricultural College (1934)
- Occupation: Architect
- Spouse: Bernice Emma Sherman (m. 1944)
- Practice: John B. Parkin Associates

Edmund Thornton Parkin (1912 – 1 August 1994) was a Canadian landscape architect. In March 1947, Parkin joined the firm John B. Parkin Associates, which had been started that January by his older brother John B. Parkin and the unrelated John C. Parkin. Edmund remained one of the senior partners in the firm until his retirement in 1964. He also served as President of the Rotory Club of Toronto. Parkin died in 1994.
