= DA Architects + Planners =

Canadian architecture firm

DA Architects + Planners Inc.
- Type: corporation
- Industry: Architecture, urban planning, master planning
- Founded: Downs/Archambault & Partners, 1969
- Founder: Barry Vance Downs, Richard Archambault
- Headquarters: Vancouver, British Columbia, Canada
- Number of employees: 20–50
- Website: DA Architects + Planners

DA Architects + Planners is an architectural firm founded in 1969 and located in Vancouver, British Columbia, Canada. The company is notable for its involvement in many of the major buildings in Vancouver, including Canada Place with Zeidler Roberts Partnership and MCMP, Vancouver Convention Centre West with LMN and MCMP and Vancouver's Library Square with Moshe Safdie.

== History ==
The architects Barry Vance Downs (1930–2022) and Richard Archambault (1931–2010) met in 1954 at the firm of Thompson Berwick and Pratt and Partners. They reunited to launch Downs/Archambault and Partners in 1969. The firm's early work includes the North Vancouver Civic Centre and Britannia Community Services Centre, Vancouver; Lester Pearson College of the Pacific with Ron Thom, high-density neighbourhoods on the 1986 Vancouver Expo lands; two campuses of Kwantlen College, Langley, B.C.; and the Campbell River Museum, Campbell River, B.C.

The firm has produced a wide variety of projects, among them, Canada Place & the Pan Pacific Hotel, Concord Pacific Place, the Yaletown Roundhouse Neighbourhood, Library Square in Downtown Vancouver, Nicklaus North Clubhouse, Irvin K. Barber Learning Centre with Pfeiffer Partners, Vancouver Convention Centre West with LMN & MCMP, Coast Coal Harbour Hotel and the River Rock Casino Resort.

In 2008, the firm's name was changed to DA Architects + Planners in response to the retirement of the founding partners. In 2020, the partnership consisted of architects Mark Ehman and James Kao.

In 2022 the firm became incorporated.

== Awards and recognition ==
- 2014 Order of Canada – Barry V. Downs – 'For his contributions as an architect who creates spaces that meld buildings with their natural surroundings.'
- 2011 AIA National Honor Award, Interior Architecture – Vancouver Convention Centre West – Vancouver, BC. LMN Architects – with DA Architects + Planners, Musson Cattell Mackey Partnership
- 2009 GLOBE Foundation and World Green Building Council – Vancouver Convention Centre West – Vancouver, BC
