= Fred Hollingsworth =

British-born Canadian architect (1917-2015)

Fred Thornton Hollingsworth
- Born: January 8, 1917; Lowton, England
- Died: April 10, 2015 (aged 98); North Vancouver, British Columbia
- Occupation: Architect
- Years active: 1946–2015
- Spouse: Phyllis Montgomery (m. 1943–2015)
- Children: 3
- Awards: Massey Gold Medal (1964); AIBC Lifetime Achievement Award
- Buildings: UBC Faculty of Law; Maltby House; The Sky Bungalow
- Projects: Neoteric House; Flying Arrow House

Fred Thornton Hollingsworth (January 8, 1917 – April 10, 2015) was a British-born Canadian architect and a pioneer of West Coast Style. He is best known for his "Neoteric" residential designs, which emphasized organic integration with the Pacific Northwest landscape, and for his leadership within the Canadian architectural community.

== Early life ==
Fred Hollingsworth was born in Lowton, England , on January 8, 1917. He was the only child of his father, a herbalist, and his mother, a homemaker. His father had a store in Oldham before coming to Canada.

In 1929, his family moved to the Marpole neighborhood of Vancouver. Hollingsworth attended Magee Secondary School, where he played in the school band alongside future bandleader Dal Richards. Another future architect, Ron Thom, also attended Magee; the two would later become prominent figures in the same professional circles.

In his spare time, Hollingsworth would design model airplanes and in 1935 and 1936 he was a Canadian National champion. Following high school, Hollingsworth got a job as an apprentice sheet metal worker at Western Steel Products, where his uncle George was a foreman. During World War II, Hollingsworth worked at the Boeing Canada plant in Vancouver as a technical illustrator, converting aircraft blueprints into simpler drawings for fabricators.

In 1943, Hollingsworth married Phyllis Montgomery. After the war, Hollingsworth formed the Fred Hollingsworth Orchestra where he played the tenor saxophone and sang. In his time as a performer he befriended Canadian jazz musicians, Lance Harrison, and Mart Kenney.

== Career ==
In 1946, Hollingsworth purchased a lot in the Capilano Highlands development in North Vancouver where he designed a home for his family. Hollingsworth had been exposed to Frank Lloyd Wright while working at Boeing and he looked at houses designed by Paul Thiery in Seattle. He then submitted his drawings to Thompson Berwick and Pratt and Partners who oversaw the development of the area which caught the attention of architect Charles "Ned" Pratt. This led to an apprenticeship at the firm Thompson Berwick and Pratt and Partners where he worked alongside Ron Thom.

During his apprenticeship, Hollingsworth travelled to Taliesin East and Taliesin West and met Frank Lloyd Wright. Once he finished his apprenticeship at Thompson Berwick and Pratt and Partners in 1951, he was offered a job at Taliesin but he declined.

In 1952, he left Thompson Berwick and Pratt and Partners to become a draftsman under William Birmingham. It was in this time where he met Bud Wood, another west coast architect. Wood encouraged Hollingsworth to take the exams needed to become an accredited architect which he did so in 1959. In 1953, Hollingsworth was elected Alderman for the North Vancouver District Council.

In 1959, Hollingsworth created his own practice in his home. Three years later he partnered with Barry Downs. Hollingsworth and Downs were awarded a Massey Gold Medal in 1964 for their work on the Maltby House and another Massey Medal for their work on the Rayer House.

Hollingsworth ended his partnership with Downs in 1967 as he wanted to focus on domestic architecture. He re-established his firm in 1967 to focus on domestic architecture, while still working on some commercial projects such as the now-demolished 1971 University of British Columbia Faculty of Law building. In 1971, Hollingsworth was elected the president of the Architectural Institute of British Columbia and served a two-year term. In 1975, he was then elected president of the Royal Architectural Institute of Canada where he served a 2-year term, and became an honorary fellow of the American Institute of Architects.

== Personal life ==
In 1943 Hollingsworth met and married Phyllis Montgomery. The couple had three children, a son, and two daughters. Hollingsworth died on April 10, 2015, aged 98 in North Vancouver.

== Legacy ==
At the time of his death, Hollingsworth had more homes listed on the West Vancouver heritage register than any other architect. His son, Russell Hollingsworth, followed him into architecture, continuing the firm.

In 2015, the Architectural Institute of British Columbia (AIBC) posthumously recognized his contributions to the province's built environment with a Lifetime Achievement Award.

== Style and design philosophy ==
Hollingsworth's architectural style, which he termed "Neoteric," was a more affordable evolution of the West Coast modernist style which were designed to respond to their environments. He was influenced by the organic principles of Frank Lloyd Wright, Richard Neutra, Harwell Harris, and Bernard Maybeck. As well as Japanese design principles

His "Neoteric" and "Flying Arrow" house designs used post-and-beam construction with an open plan on top of a concrete slab floor. Hollingsworth's "Neoteric" and "Flying Arrow" house designs were often oriented away from the street and followed the organic architectural principal of building the house around the natural elements and constraints of the site.

He often used open-concept layouts anchored by a massive central hearth. To make modernism accessible to the post-war middle class, he used a strict modular grid system that used 4x8 plywood sheets as standard measurement that reduced material waste. His work integrated the outdoors and indoors, achieved through the use of deep eaves for the rainy climate, clerestory windows, floor to ceiling windows, and French doors that would look out to the sea or forest.

== Selected works ==
- Hollingsworth House (1946) – North Vancouver. His first residence and a prototype for the Neoteric style.
- The Sky Bungalow (1951) – A compact demonstration home built in a downtown Vancouver parking lot.
- Rayer House (1964) – West Vancouver. In partnership with Barry Downs, won a Massey Medal in 1964.
- Maltby House (1964) – West Vancouver. In partnership with Barry Downs, won a Massey Gold Medal in 1964 for its "curving form".
- UBC Faculty of Law (1971) – Vancouver. An institutional project featuring a central courtyard (demolished 2009).

== Bibliography ==
- Bellerby, Greg; Liscombe, Rhodri Windsor; Downs, Barry (2005). Living Spaces: The Architecture of Fred Thornton Hollingsworth. Victoria, B.C.: Orca Book Publishers. ISBN 9781551434841.
