= Henry Sears (architect) =

Canadian architect (1929–2003)

Henry Sears FRAIC RCA OAA
- Sears in the mid-1960s
- Born: October 30, 1929; Toronto, Ontario, Canada
- Died: March 19, 2003 (aged 73); Toronto, Ontario, Canada
- Education: B. Arch
- Alma mater: University of Toronto
- Occupations: Architect, planner
- Movement: Modernism
- Spouse: Doreen Sears (m. 1951)
- Children: 2

Henry Sears FRAIC RCA OAA (October 30, 1929 – March 19, 2003) was a Canadian modernist architect, and an urban and gallery planner. He was a founding partner of both Klein & Sears Architects and Sears & Russell Architects Ltd. His work centred around social housing development on a neighbourhood scale. It spanned Canada, the United States and Europe.

== Career ==
Sears began his career in 1958, opening an architecture firm with Jack Klein. The firm maintained close ties to Raymond Moriyama, with whom they shared an office that opened on the same day. The Sears family lived on Woodlawn Avenue in the neighbourhood of Summerhill, Toronto for some time, living alongside many other architects and academics on the street and in the area.

As part of Sears & Russell Architects Ltd., beginning in 1987, Henry Sears' work shifted focus to the design and planning of cultural institutions. The firm built a team of specialists to adapt to the many areas in which the partners now worked. The geographic reach of Sears & Russell began to shift as well, taking on new clients in the United States and Europe. This produced a balance of national and international work, strengthening Sears' presence abroad.

Throughout his career, Sears developed an architectural style. His primary material was brick, influenced by the homogeneity of European communities that use it. This applied a modern approach to a traditional technique and style. Many of his projects had shared communal spaces such as paths or courtyards, deemed an "exemplary design solution" by James Murray of Canadian Architect, along with the placement of cars outside of the major arteries of the project or underground. This focus on community interaction and involvement was part of a movement based on the Defensible space theory. Using this approach, Sears designed Alexandra Park which, in the 1990s, went on to become the first self-managed public housing initiative in Canadian history.

Sears was named the third most interesting Canadian in 1978 as part of The First Original Unexpurgated Canadian book of Lists with the reasoning that

This Toronto-based architect is a theoretician who embraces sociology and psychology to help others design buildings and institutions that serve the soul as well as the eye.

== Buildings ==
Buildings designed by Henry Sears
| Image | Name | Address | City | Year Completed | Awards | Citation |
|---|---|---|---|---|---|---|
| | Atkinson Co-Operative (Alexandra Park) | 95-111 Denison Ave., 113-117 Denison Ave., 585-599 Dundas St. W., 170-174 Grange Ave., 161-163 Vanauley Walk, 170 Vanauley Walk, 2-6 White Court Pl., 140-146 Willison Pl. | Toronto, Canada | 1969 | Canadian Housing Design Council National Design Award (1967) and Honourable Mention (1969) | |
| | Bay-Charles Towers | 55-57 Charles St. W. | Toronto, Canada | 1980 | Canadian Housing Design Council Award for Mixed-Use Housing | |
| | Bleecker Street Street Co-Operative Homes West Building | 85 Bleecker St. | Toronto, Canada | 1980 | | |
| | Cohl Residence | 18 Bitteroot Rd. | Toronto, Canada | 1961 | | |
| | Don Valley Woods (Citadel Village) | 1-11, 15-31 Valley Woods Rd. | Toronto, Canada | 1967 | 2 Massey Medals for Architecture (1964 & 1967) and Canadian Housing Design Council Centennial Award (1967) | |
| | Fieldstone Co-op | 135 Bleecker St. | Toronto, Canada | 1981 | | |
| | Goldman House | 54 Blue Forest Dr. | Toronto, Canada | 1959 | | |
| | Greb Administration Building | 51 Ardelt Ave. | Kitchener, Canada | 1967 | | |
| | Green Residence | 16 Bitteroot Rd. | Toronto, Canada | 1961 | | |
| | Holly-Dunfield Mixed Housing | 70 Dunfield Ave. | Toronto, Canada | 1977 | Canadian Architect Award of Excellence (1976) | |
| | Hugh Garner Housing Co-operative | 550 Ontario St. | Toronto, Canada | 1981-1982 | | |
| | Karp Residence | 17 Beaver Valley Rd. | Toronto, Canada | 1961 | | |
| | Oakdale Manor | 2265 Jane St. | Toronto, Canada | 1962 | Massey Medal Finalist (1964) | |
| | Sheppard Place | 4455 Bathurst St. | Toronto, Canada | 1980 | | |
| | Tranby Terrace | 102-106 Avenue Rd., 11 Tranby Ave., 8 Tranby Terrace | Toronto, Canada | 1981 | | |
| | University of Guelph East Residence | 64 East Ring Road | Guelph, Canada | 1972 | | |
| | University of Guelph Wellington Woods Student Residence | 252 Stone Rd. W. | Guelph, Canada | 1972 | | |
| | Whitburn Apartments | 111-117 Whitburn Crescent | Toronto, Canada | 1961 | | |
| | Wilmington Elementary School | 330 Wilmington Ave. | Toronto, Canada | 1959 | | |
| | Wilmington Park Community Centre | 205 Wilmington Ave. | Toronto, Canada | 1959 | Massey Medal Finalist (1961) | |
| | Winchester Square | 55, 101 Bleecker St. | Toronto, Canada | 1980 | | |
| | | 55 The Esplanade | Toronto, Canada | 1982 | OAA Landmark Winner | |

== Curatorial and gallery work ==
Henry Sears contributed to the gallery design and curatorial approach of many museums around the globe. When the National Museum of Ireland was lacking display space, they called on Sears to lead the creation of a master plan for a new building on the Collins Barracks, Dublin grounds, along with the functional brief that would act as a guide to implement the change. He found "The challenge was to incorporate the technically demanding requirements of a contemporary museum into the existing historic context appropriately and sensitively." Sears then went on to develop the museum's exhibit strategy and the functional brief for its Irish folklife division. He described that "Working in Ireland seems to have opened a world of possibilities for the firm." Other building design of cultural institutions includes the curatorial centre at Ken Seiling Waterloo Region Museum, a partnership with Joe Somfay Architect Inc., and additions to both Whitby's Centennial building, and Mississauga's Benares Historic House, where a museum was established in 1995. In Whitby, this new multi-story West Wing was part of a reconfiguration to house a museum and the Whitby archives and, in Sears' words, for the institution to "...play a significant part in the cultural life of the community".

Sears also played a role in developing a new curatorial approach at the Royal Ontario Museum in consultation with its staff. He consulted on gallery design at the museum and taught the same subject at the Adler Planetarium in Chicago. Sears reported to the Museum of Vancouver and its H. R. MacMillan Space Centre in 1996, recommending serious structural reforms. This resulted in new management with increased oversight from the Vancouver City Council, along with greater input from indigenous peoples. In the same year, he reported on the state of the Oshawa Museum as part of a facility study with the Canadian Conservation Institute and the cultural facilities in the City of Hamilton. Sears created master plans for both the Sharon Temple in East Gwillimbury, Ontario, and the B&O Railroad Museum in Baltimore. He performed a feasibility study in 1986 at the Bruce County Museum and Cultural Centre and a facilities study of the Kinngait Cultural Centre in 1990. He designed permanent exhibition space at both the Nova Scotia Museum of Industry in 1993 and the McDonald Observatory. Sears consulted with Yale's Peabody Museum of Natural History, the Canadian Forces Communication & Electronic Museum at CFB Kingston, the New York State Museum in Albany, and the Ojibwe Cultural Foundation on Manitoulin Island, Ontario.

== Honours and awards ==
- Fellow of the Royal Architectural Institute of Canada (FRAIC) (1971)
- Member of the Royal Canadian Academy of Arts
- Member of the Ontario Association of Architects
- 2 Massey Medals for Architecture (1964 & 1967)
- Canadian Architect Award of Excellence (1976)
- 2 Canadian Housing Design Council National Design Awards (1967 & 1985), 2 Honourable Mentions (1969 & 1976),
- Centennial Award (1967)
- OAA Landmark Winner (2009)
