= Jerome Markson =

Canadian architect (1929–2023)

- Born: 1929; Toronto, Ontario, Canada
- Died: November 18, 2023 (aged 93–94); Toronto, Ontario, Canada
- Education: University of Toronto
- Occupation: Architect
- Spouse: Mayta Silver
- Awards: RAIC Gold Medal (2022)
- Practice: Jerome Markson Architect
- Projects: Alexandra Park Public Housing; Group Health Centre, Sault Ste. Marie; David B. Archer Co-operative Housing; Market Square Condominiums

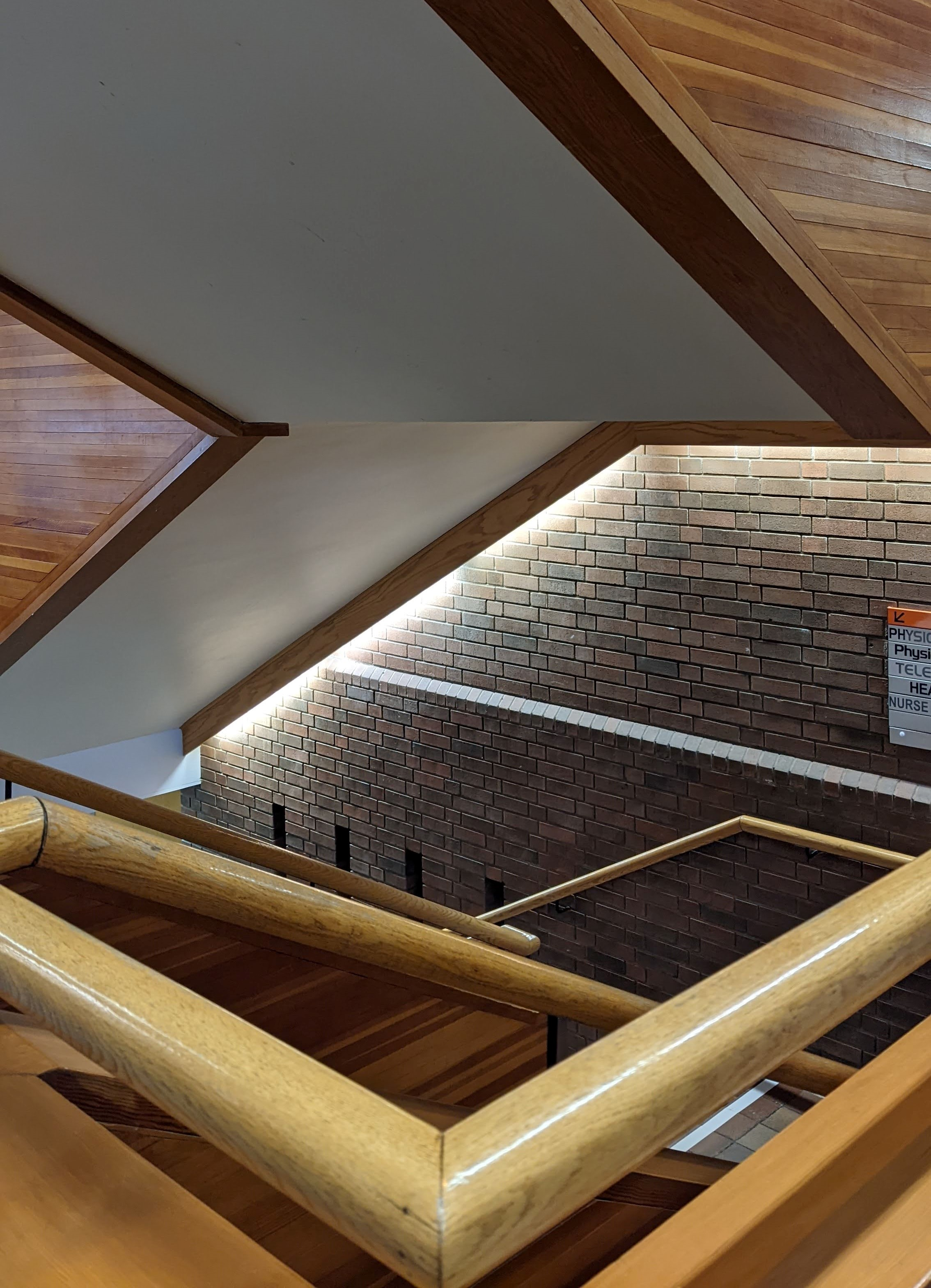
Looking down a Group Health Centre Stairwell

Jerome Markson (1929 – November 18, 2023) was a Canadian architect based in Toronto, Ontario. He was perhaps best known for his multi-family urban housing projects such as Alexandra Park Public Housing.

== Life ==
=== Early life ===
Above their father's street-level medical practice, Markson and his siblings were raised between two booming immigrant neighbourhoods, Kensington Market and the (no longer existent) Ward. His parents Etta and Charles were eastern European immigrants from Lithuania and Poland respectively.

=== Education ===
In 1948, Markson began his architectural studies at the University of Toronto along with other members of a new generation of architects who emerged after the war. He, along with the rest of his first year peers began their studies in a building which had been used as a bomb-making facility during WWII in Ajax, Ontario.

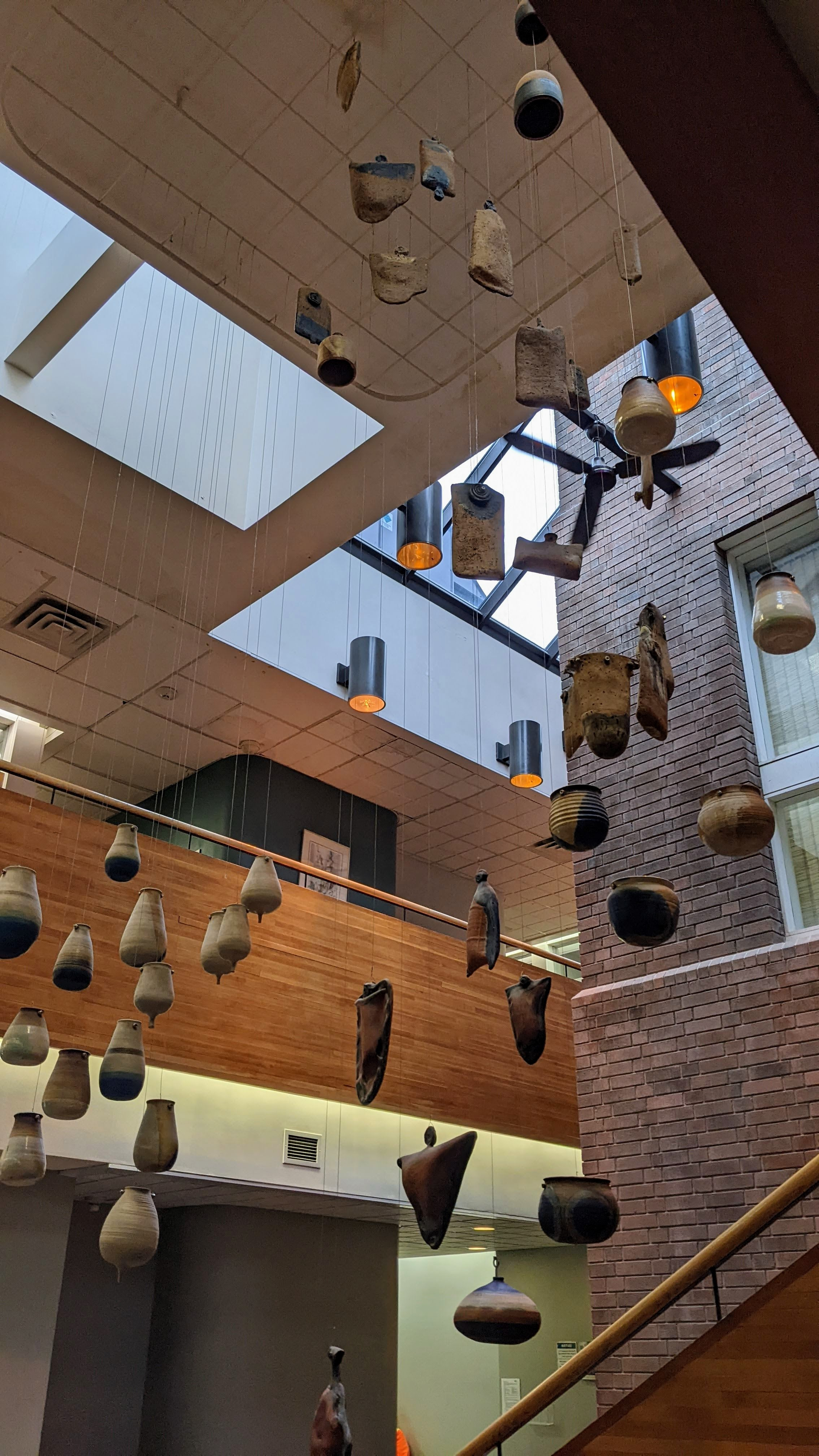
Looking upward at the Group Health Centre in Sault Ste. Marie, Ontario

Markson also attended summer courses at the Cranbrook Academy of Art, where his design style and philosophy was greatly impacted by Eliel Saarinen, a long-time director of the school. It was here where he would also meet ceramics artist, and his soon-to-be spouse Mayta Silver.

=== Death ===
Markson died in Toronto on November 18, 2023, at the age of 94.

== Career ==
Markson began his architecture career working in smaller positions for architects Eugene G. Faludi, James Murray, George Robb and Venchiarutti & Venchiarutti.

=== Practice ===
In 1955, he opened his practice in post-WWII Toronto. He worked independently under the name Jerome Markson Architect for the majority of his career, except for two occasions in which he partnered with Ernie Hodgson and Ronji Borooah from 1992-1999 and 1992-2005, respectively.

=== Style ===
Markson was known for his innovative use of lightwells, atriums, courtyards and greenspaces to blur the line between the interior and exterior.

=== Notable works ===
Moses Residence 1961 https://www.jstor.org/stable/j.ctv6cfrnw?googleloggedin=true&oauth_data=eyJlbWFpbCI6ImtlbkBvYnZ1cy5tZSIsImluc3RpdHV0aW9uSWRzIjpbXSwicHJvdmlkZXIiOiJnb29nbGUifQ

- Goldblatt Residence, 1955
- Goldblatt II was built in 1957 for Malcolm and Sondi Goldblatt
- Bathurst Jewish Centre, 1961
- Group Health Centre, 1962
- Alexandra Park, 1965
- David B. Archer Co-operative Housing, 1976
- Market Square Condominiums, 1980

=== Awards ===
In 2022, Markson's contributions as a Canadian architect were recognized when he received the Gold Medal by the Royal Architectural Institute of Canada.
