= History of Toronto Pearson International Airport =

In its early years, what is now Toronto Pearson International Airport was known as the Malton Airport. Established in 1937, it was built by the Toronto Harbour Commission and was originally intended to serve as an alternate airfield to the downtown Toronto Island Airport (now known as Billy Bishop Toronto City Airport). Pearson instead became the primary airport for the Greater Toronto Area and the entire Golden Horseshoe region. Today, Toronto Pearson is the largest and busiest airport in Canada and is among the busiest airports in the world.

== 1937–1946 ==
=== Construction ===
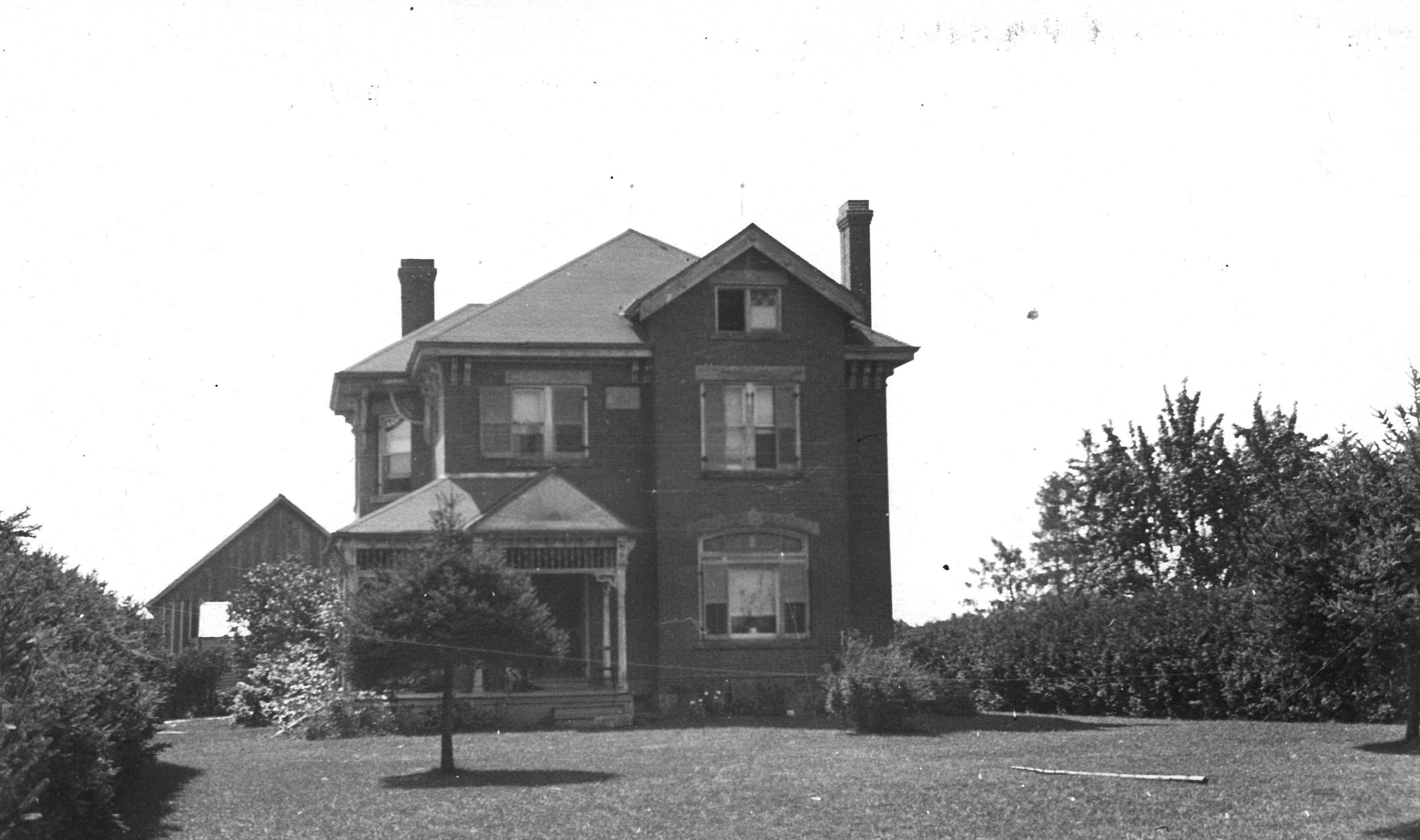
The Frank Chapman Farm House - the first terminal and office at Malton Airport

Trans-Canada Air Lines was expected to begin operations in 1937, and the Government of Canada wanted to build an airport to serve Toronto. In November 1936, Toronto City Council formed an "Advisory Airport Committee" to advise on where to build a municipal airport. The committee proposed several locations and of these two were approved by the Government of Canada, which agreed to fund one-quarter of the project. The two sites were the Toronto Islands and Malton, north-west of Toronto. A seaplane and land airport would be built at the island, and an auxiliary field was to be built at Malton. After two days of debate, City Council voted 14–7 to approve the construction of both airports.

In April 1937, land agents representing the Toronto Harbour Commission approached farmers in Malton who owned Lots 6-10 on Lines 5 (Torbram Road) and 6 (Airport Road) to acquire land for Malton Airport. The land covered 13 farms:

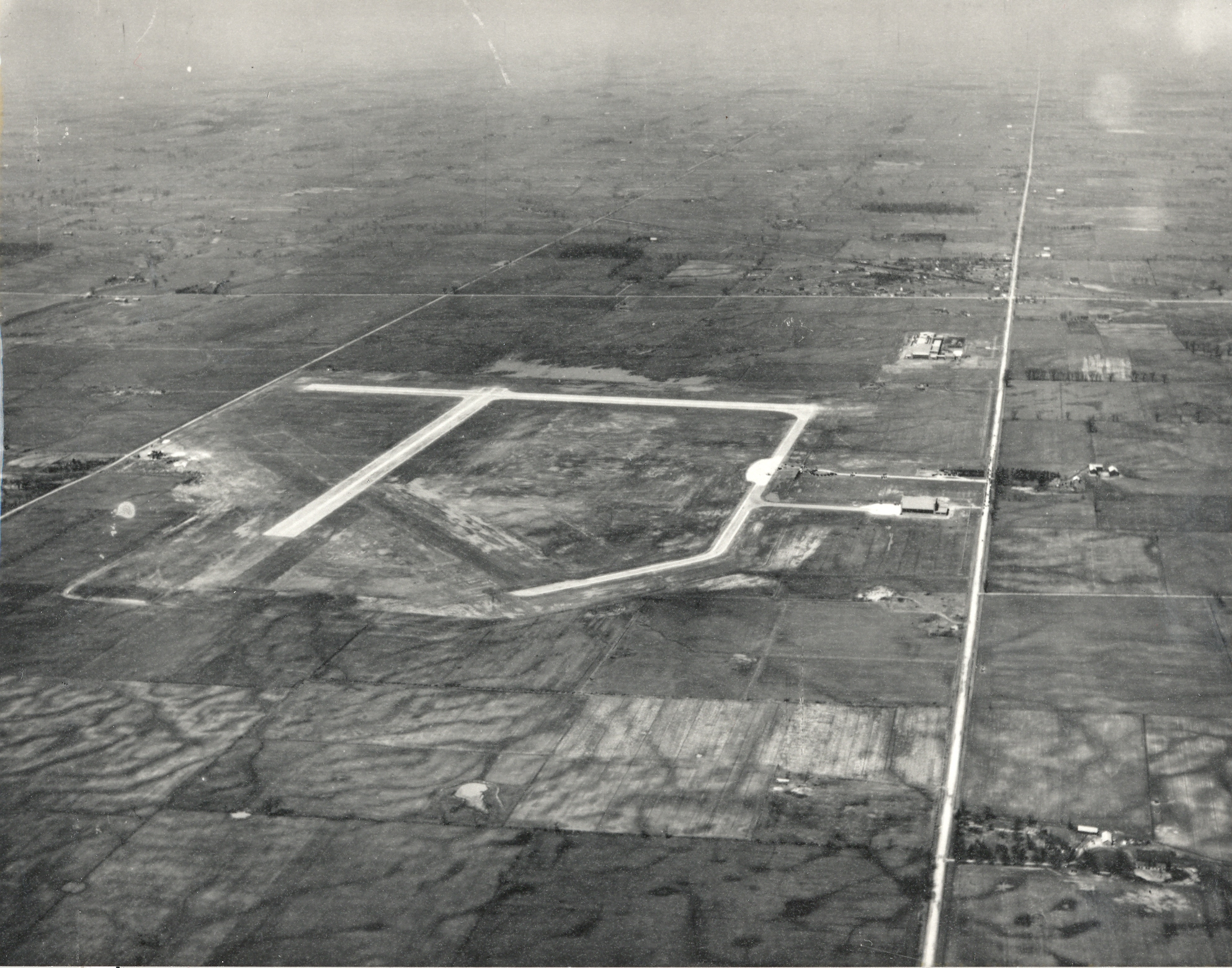
Aerial view of Malton Airport, circa 1938

- Thomas Osborne - 100 acres (Conc. 6, Lot 10)
- Robert H. Peacock - 100 acres (Conc. 6, Lot 9),
- Frank Chapman - 100 acres (Conc. 6, Lot 8) and 50 acres (Conc. 6, Lot 6)
- Rowland Estate - 100 acres (Conc. 6, Lot 7) - originally held by David Rowland at least from the 1850s
- A. Schrieber - 100 acres (Conc. 5E, Lot 10)
- W.A. (Billy) Cripps - 200 acres (Conc. 5W, Lot 10)
- Wilbur Martin - 100 acres (Conc. 5E, Lot 9)
- David J. Lammy - 150 acres (Conc. 5W, Lot 9) - originally held by James Lammy at least from the 1850s
- Mack Brett - 150 acres (Conc.5W, Lot 8,9)
- John H. Perry - 100 acres (Conc. 5E, Lot 8)
- Lydia Garbutt - 100 acres (Conc. 5W, Lot 8)
- John Dempster - 100 acres (Conc. 5E, Lot 7)
- Horace C. Death - 99 acres (Conc. 5E, Lot 6)

Agreements were drawn up for a total purchase of 570.9 hectares (1,410.8 acres), and several farmers sold lots ranging in size from 20 to 80 hectares (50 to 200 acres). The Chapman farm house was the first office and airport terminal. The construction of the airfield would result in the burial of Silver Creek, one of many creeks in the area that connected to Etobicoke Creek.

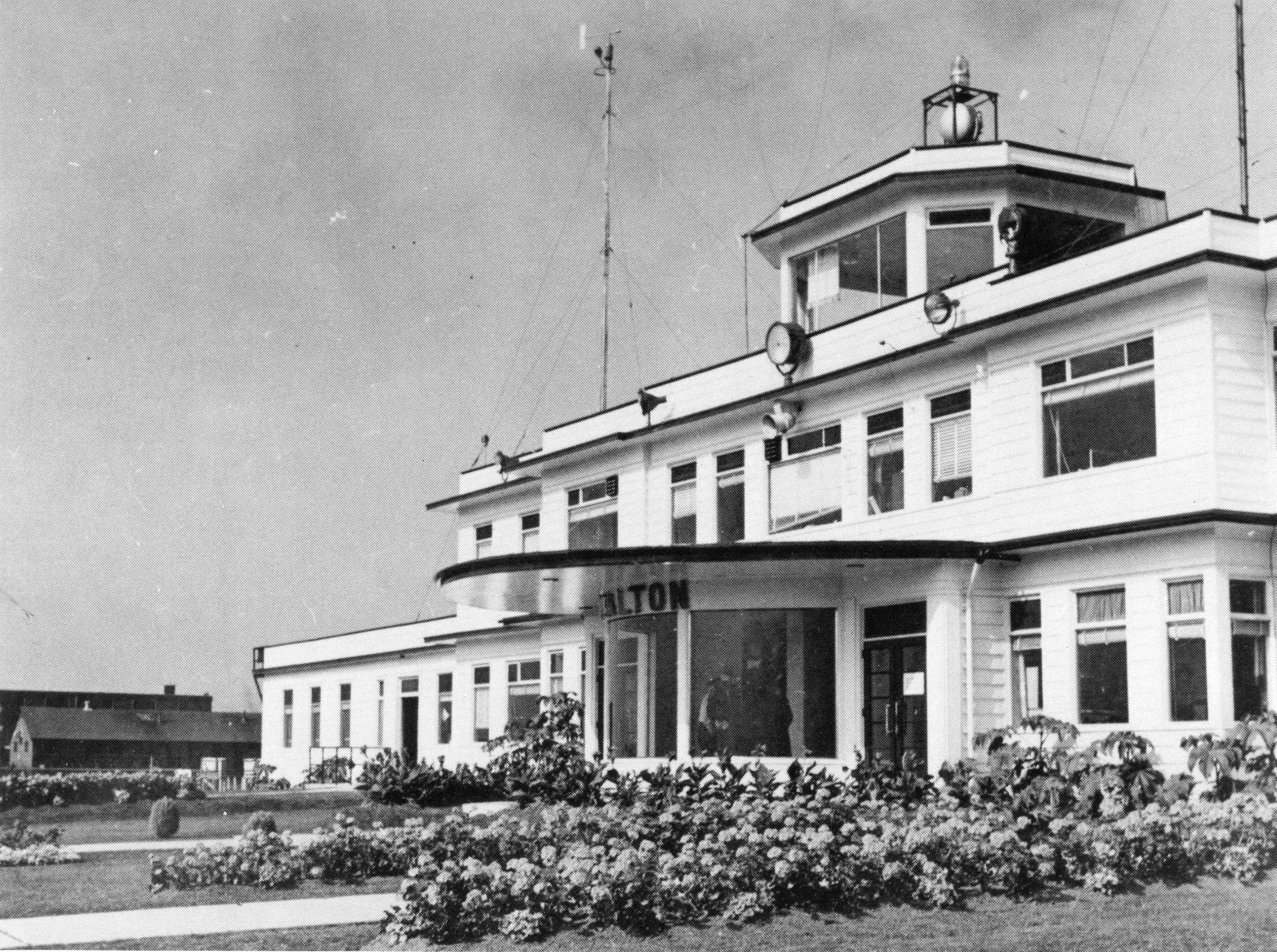
The second terminal and administration building at Malton Airport c. 1943. The Toronto Harbour Commission constructed this wood frame terminal in 1939. This terminal was a twin of the terminal on Toronto Island.

The second terminal, a standard wood frame building, was built in 1938. The airport at the time covered 170 hectares (420 acres) with full lighting, radio, weather reporting equipment, two hard surface runways, and one grass landing strip. The first landing at Malton was an American Airlines DC-3 on August 29, 1938. The first scheduled passenger flight to Malton Airport was a Trans-Canada Air Lines DC-3 that landed on August 29, 1939.

=== World War II ===
From June 1940 to July 1942, during the Second World War, the British Commonwealth Air Training Plan (BCATP) operated No. 1 Elementary Service Flying School (EFTS). From 1940 to 1945 No. 1 Air Observer School (AOS) also operated at Malton Airport. Aeronautical Inspection Directorate's Inspector School was also based at Malton to overlook aircraft production and the training schools.

In approximately 1942 the aerodrome was listed as RCAF & D of T Aerodrome - Malton, Ontario at 43°41′N 79°38′W with a variation of 7 degrees west and elevation of 560 ft (170 m). The aerodrome was listed with three runways as follows:

Runway Name	Length	Width	Surface
5/23	3,900 ft (1,200 m)	150 ft (46 m)	Hard Surfaced
10/28	4,650 ft (1,420 m)	150 ft (46 m)	Hard Surfaced
14/32	4,030 ft (1,230 m)	150 ft (46 m)	Hard Surfaced

During the World War II BCATP built six hangars, drill hall and several h-huts and administrative buildings to support the training program. The two BCATP schools flew Avro Anson (built in Malton by Victory Aircraft) and de Havilland Tiger Moth during their time at Malton. After the war No. 10 Aeronautical Inspection District occupied the training school facilities with Veterans Affairs utilizing the huts The RCAF left Malton in 1946 and the buildings later demolished as the airport expanded.

== 1946–1958 ==
=== Initial Growth ===
A third "TCA" terminal was built to the western side of the second wood frame terminal in 1949. It could handle 400,000 passengers per year and had an observation deck on the roof. In front of the old terminal was a set of stairs leading to a ramp to allow visitors to access the rooftop observation deck. Further expansion saw the expropriation of land near the hamlet of Elmbank. The runways were 5/23, a 3,368 m (11,050 ft) runway (used for test flights of the CF-105 Arrow (Avro Arrow) fighter from the Avro Canada plant); 14/32, a 3,498 m (11,475 ft) runway (replaced by 15L/33R); and 10/28, a 2,263 m (7,425 ft) runway that now is a taxiway.

=== U.S. Border Preclearance ===
Preclearance was pioneered at Pearson in 1952 as a convenience to allow it to connect as a domestic airport to the many smaller airports in the United States that at the time lacked customs and immigration facilities. It was at first a service performed by U.S. Customs agents at the gate. U.S. federal government concerns over smuggling between precleared and non-cleared passengers at Toronto International (who at that time shared mixed terminal space) nearly ended the program in the 1970s, until a compromise was reached that called for segregated facilities. Today, Pearson handles 8 million passengers through its U.S. customs and immigration preclearance facilities per year, which is roughly one quarter of all passenger traffic at the airport.

== 1958–1996 ==
=== Transport Canada Management ===
In November 1958, the municipal government of Toronto sold the airport to the federal government to be managed by the Department of Transport. In 1960, it was renamed Toronto International Airport.

The 1939 and 1949 addition (and surrounding structures) were torn down in 1964 with the area developed for Air Canada's hangar with the terminal site now occupied by the Vista Cargo Centres (Cargo Area 5).

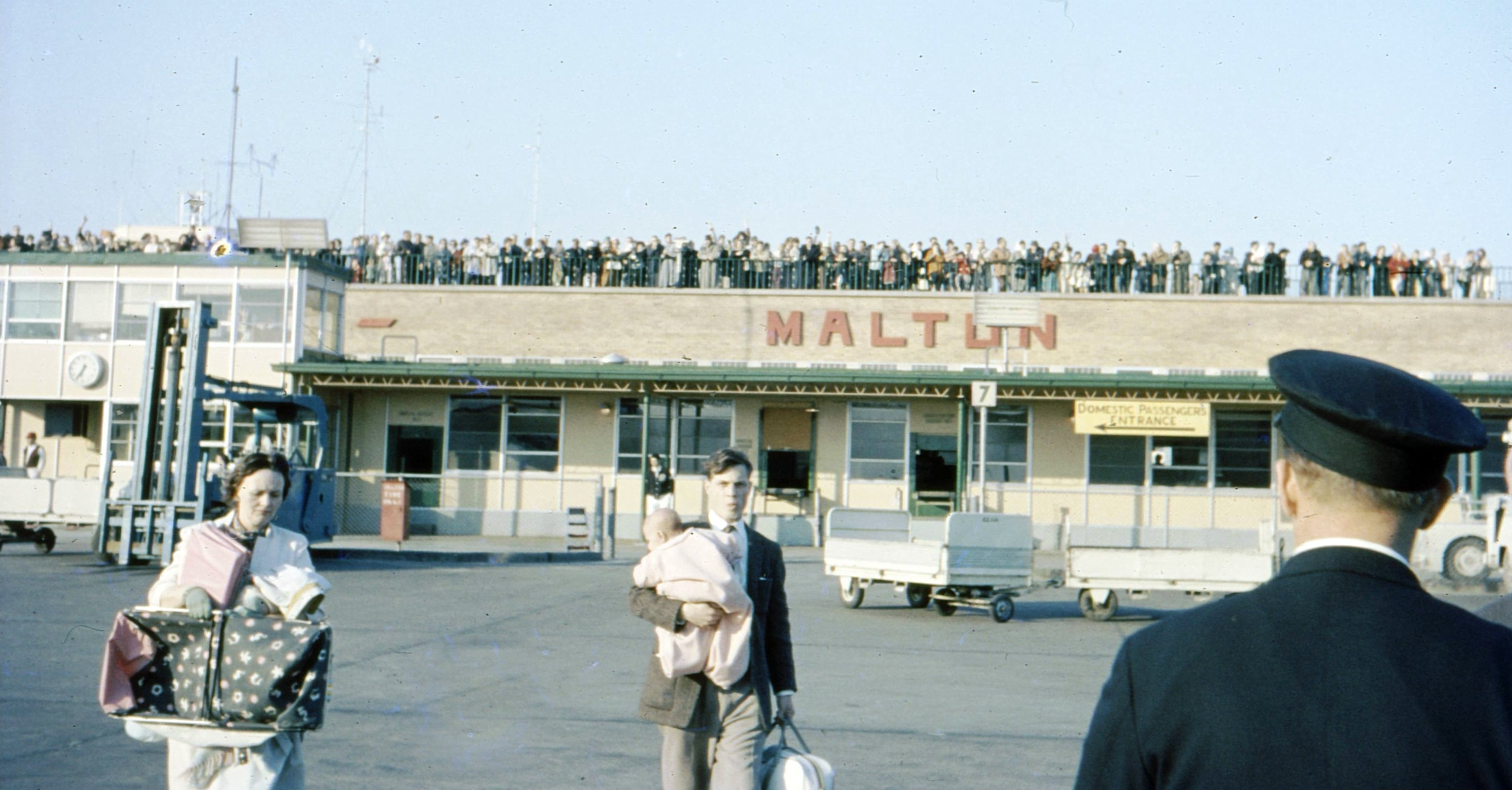
Malton "TCA" Airport 1960. This was the third terminal at Malton Airport and was built in 1948–49. It was demolished after "Aeroquay One" came on-stream in 1964. The crowd of people is watching the planes come and go from the observation deck.

=== Aeroquay One and Terminal 2 ===
The third "TCA" terminal was demolished in the late 1960s and replaced by the Aeroquay One terminal building, which was built further south of the original site along Airport Road. Aeroquay One (also called Terminal 1) had a square central structure housing ticketing and baggage facilities topped by a parking garage with about eight levels and ringed by a two-storey passenger concourse leading to the gates. It was designed by John B. Parkin, with construction taking place between 1957 and 1964. Aeroquay One was officially opened on February 28, 1964 by Prime Minister Lester B. Pearson.

Considered state-of-the-art in the 1960s, the original Terminal 1 became overloaded by the early 1970s. Terminal 2 opened as a passenger airline terminal on June 15, 1972. Initially, it served only charter airlines, but it became the hub for Air Canada passenger flights on April 29, 1973. While a legend suggests that Terminal 2 was originally intended as a freight terminal, this was not the case. The legend may have stemmed from the fact that a cargo facility was used as a temporary passenger terminal while waiting for completion of the new terminal.

Terminal 2 had a facility for United States border preclearance and handled both domestic and international trans-border traffic. Domestic traffic was moved to the new Terminal 1 when it became operational, leaving Terminal 2 to handle international traffic to the United States for Air Canada and its Star Alliance partner United Airlines. A passenger tunnel with moving walkways at the northwest corner of Terminal 2 connected it with Terminal 1.

The airport was renamed Lester B. Pearson International Airport in 1984, in honour of Lester B. Pearson, the fourteenth Prime Minister of Canada and recipient of the 1957 Nobel Peace Prize. Operationally, the airport is often referred to as Toronto Pearson.

=== Airport Express / Airporter Service ===
From 1979 to 1993, Gray Coach operated the Toronto Airport Express interurban bus service to Toronto Pearson International Airport. It ceased operations after the operator's sale to Greyhound Bus Lines of Canada. It was replaced by Pacific Western Airport Express.

=== Terminal 3 ===
Terminal 3, which opened on February 21, 1991, was originally built to offset traffic from the original Terminal 1 and Terminal 2. Terminal 3 was designed by B+H Architects and Scott Associates Architects Inc. The terminal, initially referred to as "Trillium Terminal 3" or the "Trillium Terminal", was originally built as a private venture and was the base of operations for the now defunct Canadian Airlines International.

The 484-room hotel adjacent to Terminal 3, was opened as a Swissôtel, also on February 21, 1991. In 1993 the hotel building was taken full control by Sheraton Hotels and Resorts as the Sheraton Gateway Hotel, which still owns the building to the present day, even after Sheraton became a wholly owned subsidiary of Marriott International since 2016.

== 1996–Present ==
=== GTAA Management ===
In 1996, the Government of Canada outsourced airport operations in Canada to local authorities which would manage the airports on a self-sufficiency basis. The new Greater Toronto Airports Authority (GTAA) was formed to manage Toronto Pearson. Its first task was to develop a plan to finance and build new terminals to manage the growing number of passengers.

In 1997, the GTAA purchased Terminal 3 and shortly thereafter began a CA$350 million expansion. A team of coordinators known as T3RD oversaw the redevelopment and expansion of the terminal.

=== Terminal 1 ===
The GTAA initiated a program to build a new Terminal 1 to replace both original Terminal 1 (Aeroquay One) and Terminal 2. The new terminal, costing $4.4 billion was a joint venture of Skidmore Owings & Merrill, Adamson Associates, and Moshe Safdie Associates. The project began in 1999 and was described as Canada's largest construction project. In order to pay for the project cost, landing fees were hiked significantly to levels similar to those of the world's busiest international airports like Heathrow Airport, leading to criticism from existing airline tenants including Air Canada whose CEO Robert Milton boycotted the opening ceremony. However GTAA president and CEO Lou Turpen had correctly assumed that airlines would stay at Toronto Pearson despite the high fees and continued with the next phase of construction. Indeed, WestJet moved its hub from Hamilton to Toronto Pearson in 2004. Besides Hamilton, the other Ontario airports in the region (Toronto-Billy Bishop which has operating curfews, and Kitchener-Waterloo) still only have a limited number of few cross-border flights as before, so the main competition to Pearson remains Buffalo Niagara International Airport.

The Infield Terminal (IFT) was built to handle traffic displaced during the development and construction of the new Terminal 1. Its gates were opened in 2002 and 2003, and a first class lounge was opened in 2005. When it was in regular use, passengers were transported by bus between Terminal 1 and the IFT to reach their gates. After its initial closure, the Infield Terminal has been frequently used as a location to film major motion pictures and television productions.

Aeroquay One ceased operations on April 5, 2004, on the completion of the first phase of the new Terminal 1. Aeroquay One was subsequently demolished to facilitate expansion of the new Terminal 1.

Terminal 3 Pier C Expansion was completed in 2004. Expansion of Terminal 3 continued with the opening of the East Processor Extension (EPE) in June 2006, adding 40 check-in counters, new retail space, additional secure 'hold-screening' for baggage, and a huge picture window that offers one of the most convenient apron viewing locations at the airport. This phase of the expansion also included improved Canada Border services and a more open arrivals hall. Phase II of the EPE was completed in 2007 and includes larger security screening areas and additional international baggage claim areas, while the West Processor Expansion Shell was completed in early 2008.

Terminal 2 saw its last day in operation as a passenger terminal January 29, 2007. The following day, airlines moved to the newly completed Pier F, or Hammerhead Pier at the current Terminal 1. Demolition of Terminal 2 began in April 2007 and concluded in November 2008.

=== Airfield Upgrades ===
In order to accommodate its growing aircraft volume, substantial redevelopment of the airside and infield systems was done. Cargo facilities were added to the centre of the airport between the parallel north–south runways in order to increase capabilities and to offset the loss of the cargo facilities that were removed for the current terminal buildings. Two runways were built to increase the number of aircraft that Toronto Pearson could process. A north–south runway, 15R/33L, was added and completed in 1997. Another east–west runway, 06R/24L, was completed in 2002.

=== Operation Yellow Ribbon ===
During the September 11 attacks in 2001, Toronto Pearson International Airport played a role in Operation Yellow Ribbon. It received 14 of the diverted international flights that were destined for the United States after the closure of US airspace.

=== Recent Developments ===
The continued increase of air traffic at Toronto Pearson resulted in a 2013 decision by Transport Canada to proceed with the planning and construction of Toronto Pickering International Airport (following a 2001 decision to simply revive plans for the airport), which would be approximately 50 km (31 mi) east of Toronto Pearson and handle up to 11.9 million passengers per year by 2032 with its three runways.

In December 2015, the Infield Terminal was upgraded and temporarily reopened to handle the Syrian refugees accepted and re-settling in Canada. After the last government-chartered refugee flight arrived on February 29, 2016, the terminal was deactivated. In total, the Infield Terminal handled 56 refugee flights carrying 13,628 refugees.

On December 15, 2015 Toronto Pearson reached the 40 million yearly passengers milestone. This was a first for any Canadian airport to achieve.

In 2015, the new Union Pearson Express (or "UP Express"), Toronto Pearson's first airport rail link, was officially opened connecting the airport to Union Station in Downtown Toronto. The UP Express travels between Union and Pearson in 25 minutes departing every 15 minutes, seven days a week. When the service was launched, it was stated that UP is projected to carry 2.35 million passengers annually, and eliminate approximately 1.2 million car trips in the first year.

From 1993 until 2014, the Toronto Airport Express was a privately operated airport shuttle bus service from the airport to downtown Toronto operated by Pacific Western Transportation. A one-way trip took approximately 45 to 90 minutes, depending on traffic. The service ceased operation on October 31, 2014 in conjunction with the opening of the Union Pearson Express.

Today, Pearson Int'l Airport covers a sprawling 4,600 acres (7.2 sq.mi., 18.6 km2) of land with five concrete/asphalt runways ranging from 9,000-11,120 feet in length, all able to handle widebody jet aircraft, along with 30 taxiways. In 2023, YYZ has come back from pre-pandemic levels (before 2020, in 2019, 50.5 million passengers went through YYZ) in terms of passengers served because of an increased demand in air travel.

== See also ==
- Toronto Pearson International Airport
- Toronto Pearson International Airport heist
- Greater Toronto Airports Authority
