= Peter Dickinson (architect) =

British-Canadian architect

- Born: Peter Allgood Rastall Dickinson; 21 October 1925; Walberswick, Suffolk
- Died: 15 October 1961 (aged 35); Montreal, Quebec, Canada
- Education: Architectural Association School of Architecture
- Occupation: Architect
- Spouse(s): Vera Klausner (m. 1950), died 2010
- Practice: Page and Steele; Peter Dickinson Associates

Peter Allgood Rastall Dickinson (21 October 1925 – 15 October 1961) was a British-Canadian architect. Practising from the late 1940s to the early 1960s and working primarily in Toronto, Dickinson is credited as one of the leaders in developing the Mid-Century Modern style in Canada during the post-World War II period.

== Biography ==
Peter Dickinson was born on 21 October 1925 in Walberswick. His father, Eric, was a partner in the brokerage firm Dickinson and Sidebottom. Peter Dickinson grew up in a home on Grove End Road in St. John's Wood, and attended Westminster School from 1938 to 1941. Having developed a passion for drawing, Dickinson entered the Architectural Association School of Architecture in 1942. After two years of school, Dickinson served in the Grenadier Guards beginning in 1944 and was honourably discharged on 26 November 1945. After the War, Dickinson returned to AA, studying with H. T. Cadbury-Brown and graduating in February 1948. Upon graduation, his first job was with architect Wells Coates. During his remaining time in England, Dickinson worked on a variety of small projects. While on a business trip to England, Toronto architect Forsey Page of Page and Steele discovered Dickinson and offered him the position of head designer at the firm.

On 3 March 1950, Dickinson married Vera Klausner. The couple had met at the Esmeralda, a club owned by Vera's sister. The two sisters were Austrian and at the outbreak of the War had been sent to England to go to boarding school. Two months after marrying, the newlyweds sailed to Canada on the RMS Franconia, leaving on 5 May and arriving in Halifax on 13 May. Four days later, Dickinson began work in Toronto. Eight years later on 16 May 1958, Peter Dickinson became a Canadian citizen.

Forsey Page and Harland Steele's firm operated out of offices on 72 St. Clair Avenue West. The firm had existed since 1925 and by the time Dickinson arrived it was designing buildings in the Georgian-modern style. Significant projects in the years before Dickinson arrived included the British American Oil Building (800 Bay Street) and the Park Lane Apartments (110 St. Clair Avenue West), the latter notable as the residence of Glenn Gould. As design chief for Page and Steele, Dickinson's early projects included the Lyndwood School, Canadian Red Cross Society Building, and the Toronto Teachers' College. By the mid-1950s, Peter Dickinson had developed a large body of work including office buildings, schools, and apartments. The Dickinsons themselves lived in one of Peter's buildings, the Benvenuto Apartments on Avenue Road.

By the late 1950s, Dickinson was eager to go out on his own. In January 1958 he left Page and Steele, forming Peter Dickinson Associates. The associates were Colin Vaughan, Dick Williams, Rod Robbie, and Fred Ashworth and the firm operated out of the Canadian Petrofina Building at 1910 Yonge Street. The first project the new firm received was the Seminary for the Jesuit Fathers of Upper Canada, located in North York. Significant projects from the early days of the new firm included the 55 Yonge Street office building, the Continental Can Building, and the 500 Avenue Road apartments. The new firm had also opened offices in Ottawa and Montreal, designing an array of buildings in both of those cities.

On 1 October 1960, the major arts venue O'Keefe Centre for the Performing Arts, opened to the public. The opening night featured the premiere of Lerner and Loewe's Camelot starring Richard Burton and Julie Andrews. The building was designed by Dickinson and Earle C. Morgan, while Dickinson was still at Page and Steele.

In the late 1950s and early 1960s, Peter Dickinson Associates designed a number of significant projects in Toronto, Ottawa, and Montréal, including the Trans-Canada Pipeline Building, the Elm Ridge Golf and Country Club, and the North Toronto Medical Building. Although not completed until after his death, it was also during this period that he designed the Imperial Bank Building in Montréal for the bank's head, Neil McKinnon. When it opened in 1962, it was the tallest building in the British Commonwealth. In January 1960, the four associates with the firm left. Shortly thereafter Dickinson appointed Peter Webb, Boris Zerafa, Jack Korbee, Peter Tirion, René Menkès, and Rick Housden as his new associates. Following Dickinson's death, members of this group would go on to form WZMH Architects.

In the early 1960s, Dickinson, a long-time chain smoker, began to experience stomach pain. He entered the Mount Sinai Hospital in Toronto in July 1961 and was diagnosed with stomach cancer. While in the hospital, he was visited by Isadore Sharp. Following the visit, Dickinson produced his last design, the Inn on the Park, which he gave to Sharp several days later. That September Dickinson transferred to the Royal Victoria Hospital in Montréal. On 15 October 1961, he died at his home in Montréal, leaving behind his wife and two sons.

== Legacy ==
Along with Dickinson, architects including John C. Parkin, James Murray, Peter Caspari, and Gordon Adamson added many modernist buildings to Toronto's built landscape over the course of the 1950s.

While many of Dickinson's works still stand, an increasing number have been lost. Most recently, the Regent Park South Towers and the Jesuit Seminary have been demolished. Out of the five houses that Dickinson designed, only one – the Isadore Sharp Residence – remains.

At the urging of Dickinson's widow, John Martins-Manteiga of Dominion Modern wrote the first book solely dedicated to Peter Dickinson's life and work. The book was published in 2010 and was researched primarily using family papers and photographs.

Many of Dickinson's original drawings are held at the Archives of Ontario as part of the "Page and Steele Architects Fonds."

== Awards ==
Peter Dickinson won the Massey Medal for Architecture for:

- Toronto Teachers' College (1955)
- Regent Park South Apartments (1958)
- Trans-Canada Pipeline Building (1961)
- Four Seasons Motor Hotel (1961)
- Ontario Hospital Association Building (1961)
- KLM Dutch Airlines Ticket Office [interior design] (1961)
- Workmen's Compensation Board Building (1961)
