= Gordon Adamson =

Canadian architect (1904–1986)

Gordon S. Adamson
- Born: Gordon Sinclair Adamson; 19 May 1904; Orangeville, Ontario, Canada
- Died: 8 January 1986 (age 81); Toronto, Ontario, Canada
- Education: University of Toronto (1928)
- Occupation: Architect
- Spouse: Bessie Arlene Graham (m. 1934)
- Practice: F. Hilton Wilkes; Sproatt and Rolph; G. S. Adamson; Adamson and Morgan; Gordon Adamson and Associates

Gordon Sinclair Adamson (19 May 1904 – 8 January 1986) was a Canadian architect. Practising from 1928 to 1971 and working mainly in Toronto and Etobicoke, he operated his own practice from 1934 until his retirement. Adamson's major contribution to architecture came following World War II when his firm became one of the leaders in the development of the Mid-Century Modern style in Canada. Adamson was known for designing high schools in the former Etobicoke Board of Education.

== Biography ==
Gordon Sinclair Adamson was born and grew up in Orangeville, Ontario. In 1924 he moved to Toronto, the city in which he would spend the remainder of his life, where he entered the architecture programme at the University of Toronto. Upon graduation in 1928, Adamson got his first job with F. Hilton Wilkes, where he worked on the Canada Permanent Trust Building. In November 1929 Adamson left Wilkes and took a position with the firm Sproatt and Rolph, where he would remain until September 1930. In June 1932 he left his job with Sproatt and Rolph to work for Edwin Kay, with whom he would remain until October 1933. After that time, Adamson moved to Montréal to work for Shell Oil Company supervising the construction of a housing unit. In July 1934, Adamson, now 30 years old, moved back to Toronto where he opened his own practice. For the remainder of his career, Adamson would run his own operation.

Initial projects of Adamson's were relatively conservative. By the end of the War, however, he had begun to transition to working in the International Style, which would dominate the architectural practice for well over a decade. The best example of Adamson's early modern work is the "Sun House," a Rosedale home designed for Clare Wood in 1944. From 1943 to 1945, Earle Morgan joined Adamson as a partner, and during this time the firm was known as "Adamson and Morgan." After Morgan left, the firm returned to its original name.

Adamson entered into the contest to design the new Toronto City Hall in 1958.

Throughout the 1950s and 1960s, Adamson's firm - along with John B. Parkin Associates and Peter Dickinson Associates - was one of Toronto's dominant architectural institutions and was responsible for the city's aesthetic transition into the modern era. Significant projects of the era included the Savoy Plaza Apartments - for which in 1953 he won his first Massey Medal - and the James Crothers House - a sprawling Lawrence Park mansion.

Gordon Adamson retired from the architectural practice in March 1971, and died on 8 January 1986 at the age of 81.

Adamson's records are all held at the Canadian Architectural Archives in Calgary as the Gordon Adamson fonds.

Adamson's firm continues to operate under the name Adamson Associates Architects and now includes affiliated offices in Vancouver, New York, Los Angeles and London.
