= John B. Parkin Associates =

Canadian architectural firm (1947–1969)

- Industry: architecture
- Founded: January 1947
- Founder: John B. Parkin
- Defunct: March 1969
- Fate: Merged with Smith Carter Searle
- Successor: Parkin Architects, Engineers, Planners (1969–71); Searle Wilbee Rowland (1971–74); Neish Owen Rowland & Roy (1974–present)
- Headquarters: 1500 Don Mills Road, North York, Ontario
- Parent: Parkin Associates Ltd.

John B. Parkin Associates was a Canadian architectural firm based in Toronto that operated from 1947 to 1969. During its life, it was the largest architectural practice in Canada and today is recognised as the country's leading proponent of modern architecture in the post-war era. The partnership was formed between John Burnett Parkin, his brother Edmund T. Parkin, and the younger, unrelated John Cresswell Parkin. John Burnett served as the firm's principal, while John Cresswell served as partner-in-charge of design.

== History ==
=== Operations of the firm, 1947–1969 ===
The Parkin firm modelled itself after the office of Albert Kahn, and used an industrial production system to produce its commissions. The firm operated from a factory-like office in Don Mills where its staff of nearly 200 was based. In contrast to many other architects of the era, the firm was fastidious about costs and deadlines. One notable project during this time was a partnership with Finnish architect Viljo Revell on Toronto City Hall (1965). The firm helped design (under direction from Australian John Andrews) the Simpsons store at Yorkdale Shopping Centre (1964).

=== Post merger, 1969–present ===
In August 1968, John B. Parkin Associates opened merger discussions with Smith Carter Searle of Winnipeg, which had offices also in Toronto, Brandon, and Thunder Bay. The merger was completed in March 1969. On 4 March, John B. Parkin, John C. Parkin, Ernest J. Smith, and James Searle held a press conference on the top floor of the Toronto-Dominion Centre to announce the merger. Later that day they flew to Winnipeg, where they held a second press conference. The Toronto office would work under the name of Parkin Architects, Engineers, Planners, while the Winnipeg office would operate under the name of Smith Carter Parkin. Shortly after the move, John B. Parkin moved to Los Angeles, where he operated a practice under the name of John B. Parkin Associates.

In January 1971, John C. Parkin left the partnership. At this time, the name of Parkin Architects, Engineers, Planners was changed to Searle Wilbee Rowland. Searle Wilbee Rowland continued to work under that name, until 15 November 1974, when it became Neish Owen Rowland & Roy. The firm, known since 1985 as NORR, remains in existence today, with offices in Toronto, Ottawa, Calgary, and Edmonton.

=== John C. Parkin's independent practice, 1971–present ===
In January 1971, John C. Parkin sold his share in the partnership and left to form his own practice, John C. Parkin Architects Planners. Later, his practice was renamed Parkin Architects Planners, and then Parkin Partnership Architects Planners. It received several important commissions in the 1970s and 1980s, including the Art Gallery of Ontario addition, the Phoenix Building, Bell Trinity Square, and Copps Coliseum. In 1986, Harland C. Lindsay and two partners acquired the assets of the firm, and on 17 December that year incorporated Parkin Architects Limited. This firm remains in operation today, with offices in Toronto, Ottawa, and Vancouver.

== Archives ==
The archives of John B. Parkin Associates and its successor firms are held at the University of Calgary in the Canadian Architectural Archives. The records, which were donated through the 1970s and 1980s, comprise the John B. Parkin Associates fonds. Additional records of John C. Parkin are held at the Canadian Centre for Architecture in Montreal. These records were donated by John C. Parkin's daughter after his death, and make up the John C. Parkin fonds.

== Works ==
Below is a partial list of works by the Parkin firm:

| Name | City | Address | Year | Status |
|---|---|---|---|---|
| Fabergé Perfumes Building | Toronto | 30 Queen Elizabeth Boulevard | 1950 | |
| Yardley of London | East York | 7 Curity Avenue | 1951 | Demolished |
| Ontario Association of Architects Building | Toronto | 50 Park Road | 1954 | |
| John C. Parkin House | North York | 75 The Bridle Path | 1954 | Altered significantly |
| Taylor Instrument Companies | Toronto | 75 Tycos Drive | 1954 | |
| Chesebrough-Ponds | Markham | 150 Bullock Drive | 1954 | Now used by Joyride and Olympian Swimming. |
| Pitney-Bowes Building | Toronto | 903 Yonge Street | 1954 | Demolished |
| John B. Parkin Associates Office | North York | 1500 Don Mills Road | 1955 | Demolished |
| Janssen-Ortho Pharmaceuticals | North York | 19 Greenbelt Drive | 1955 | |
| Dominion Electrohome | Kitchener | 809 Wellington Street North | 1955 | |
| Don Mills Federal Building | North York | 169 The Donway West | 1958 | |
| Sun Life Building | Toronto | 200 University Avenue | 1960 | |
| Imperial Oil Ontario Regional Headquarters | North York | 825 Don Mills Road | 1962 | Demolished |
| Toronto International Airport Air Terminal Building: Aeroquay No. 1 | Malton | | 1962 | Demolished |
| Barber-Ellis | Toronto | 20 Overlea Boulevard | 1964 | |
| Simpson’s store at Yorkdale Shopping Centre | North York | 3401 Dufferin Street | 1964 | Converted as Hudson’s Bay 1991, vacant June 2025 |
| J. Douglas Crashley House | Toronto | 3 Old George Place | 1965 | Altered significantly |
| Bata Shoes Head Office | North York | 59 Wynford Drive | 1965 | Demolished |
| IBM Canada Headquarters | North York | 1150 Eglinton Avenue East | 1967 | |
| Avon Theatre | Stratford | 99 Downie Street | 1967 | Façade demolished |
| Ottawa station | Ottawa | 200 Tremblay Road | 1967 | |
| Shaw & Begg Building | Toronto | 350 Bloor Street East | 1967 | |
| St. John's City Hall | St. John's | | 1969 | |
Projects completed by Parkin Architects or Searle Wilbee Rowland
| National Life Building | Toronto | 522 University Avenue | 1971 | |
| Equitable Life Building | Waterloo | 1 Westmount Road North | 1971 | |
| Four Seasons Sheraton | Toronto | 123 Queen Street West | 1972 | |
| Great Northern Capital Building | Toronto | 180 Dundas Street W | 1972 | |
| Pearkes Building | Ottawa | 101 Colonel By Drive | 1974 | |
