= Barry Downs (architect) =

Canadian architect (1930–2022)

Barry Downs OC
- Born: Barry Vance Downs; June 19, 1930; Vancouver, British Columbia, Canada
- Died: July 19, 2022 (aged 92); Vancouver, British Columbia, Canada
- Education: University of Washington; University of British Columbia
- Occupations: Architect and urban planner
- Spouse: Mary Stewart (m. 1955; died 2021)
- Children: 2

Barry Vance Downs OC (June 19, 1930 – July 19, 2022) was a Canadian architect and urban planner. He was known for his contributions to West Coast Modern architecture and for his works that blended buildings with their surrounding natural landscapes.

== Early life ==
Downs was born on June 19, 1930, in Vancouver, British Columbia. His mother was a homemaker while his father was a sales executive. He grew up in the West Point Grey neighborhood of the city and graduated from Lord Byng Secondary School. During his time at the school, he was introduced to Art Phillips, who would later go on to become a mayor of the city of Vancouver and also be one of Downs's clients.

After graduating, he enrolled in a commerce course at the University of British Columbia, which he quit after two years. He then moved to Seattle and studied architecture at the University of Washington. During his time at the university, he was influenced by the architectural and design themes of minimalism advanced by architects such as the German-American Ludwig Mies van der Rohe.

== Career ==
Downs returned to Vancouver after getting his degree in 1954. He started out as an apprentice at Thompson Berwick and Pratt and Partners, a prominent architecture and design firm in the city. During his time there, he was introduced to other architects, including Ronald Thom, Doug Shadbolt, and Fred Hollingsworth, shaping his early views of West Coast Modern architecture. Themes of his work during this stage included moving away from design ideas of austerity. While he did not move away from the ideas of minimalism, he was introduced to the addition of "organic texture and form".

In 1956, he took an architectural tour around the world with his wife, visiting landmarks including Frank Lloyd Wright's houses in Oak Park, Illinois, and the Johnson Wax Headquarters in Wisconsin, before traveling to Europe to see Le Corbusier's Unité d'habitation residential buildings in Marseille, France. These radical architectural examples further influenced him towards modernist architecture.

Downs partnered with Hollingsworth between 1963 and 1967 before starting DA Architects + Planners with Richard Archambault in 1969. Downs has been noted for advancing the use of understated exteriors allowing for a natural flow of space, which has since been a characteristic of modern architecture in the Pacific Northwest. In the 1990s, Downs was part of the team that redeveloped the site of Expo 86 along False Creek, converting it into the largest private development in North America at that time.

Downs received the Order of Canada in 2014 for his contributions to architecture. The citation specifically called his contributions to the West Coast Modernist style of architecture and his works that blended buildings and their surrounding natural landscape. He was also a member of the City of Vancouver's civic design and heritage panel.

== Personal life ==
Downs married Mary Stewart (1931–2021) in 1955. The couple had met a few years earlier in Bowen Island, an island off the coast of Vancouver. The couple had two children, a son and a daughter. Downs died on July 19, 2022, aged 92.

== Select works ==
Sources:

- North Vancouver Civic Center, North Vancouver, British Columbia
- Britannia Communia Community Services Center, Vancouver, British Columbia
- Lester Pearson College, Pedder Bay, British Columbia (collaboration with Ronald Thom)
- Vancouver Library Square, Vancouver, British Columbia (collaboration with Moshe Safdie)
- Campbell River Museum, Campbell River, British Columbia
- Canada Place, Vancouver, British Columbia
- Yaletown Roundhouse, Vancouver, British Columbia
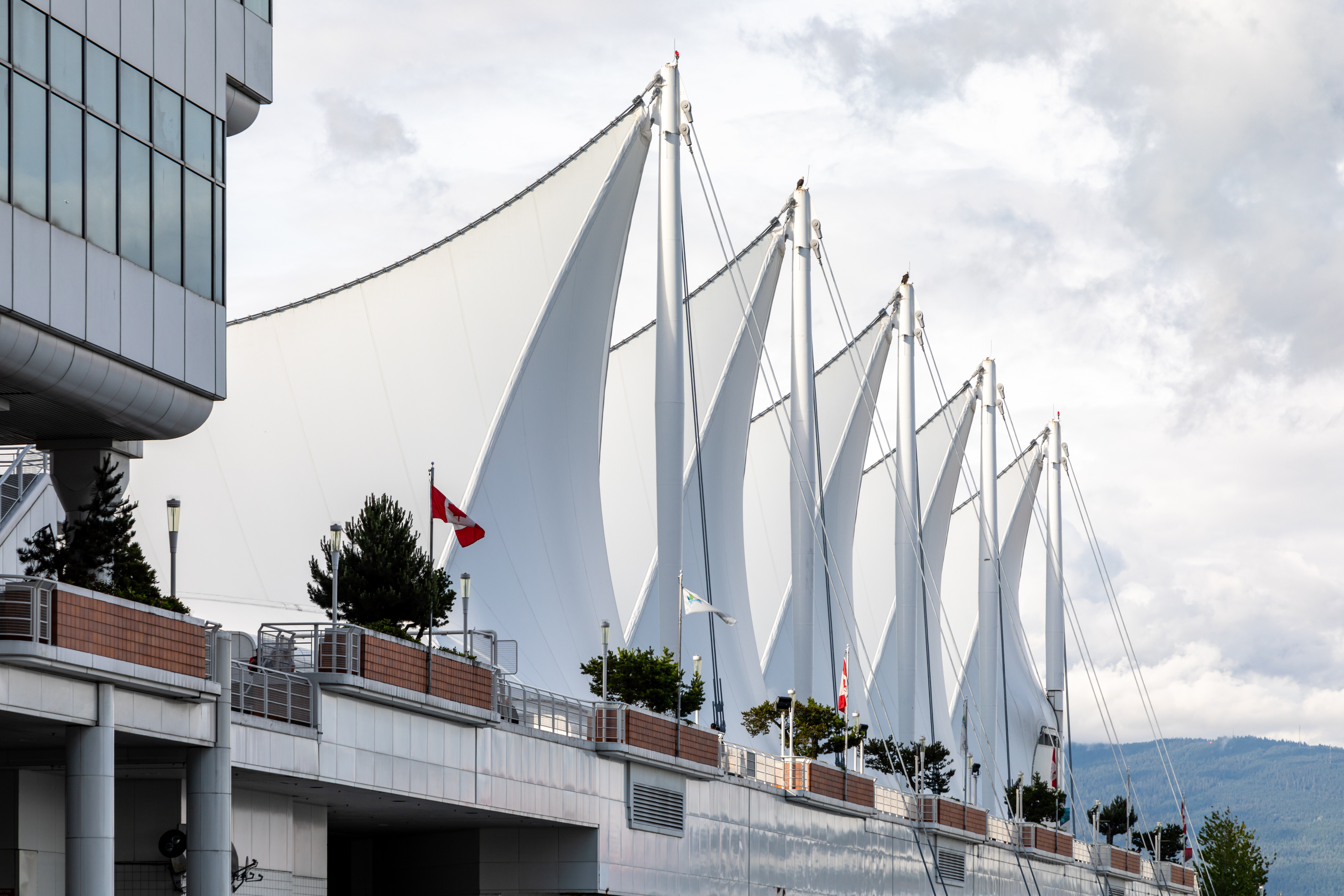
Canada Place, Vancouver, British Columbia

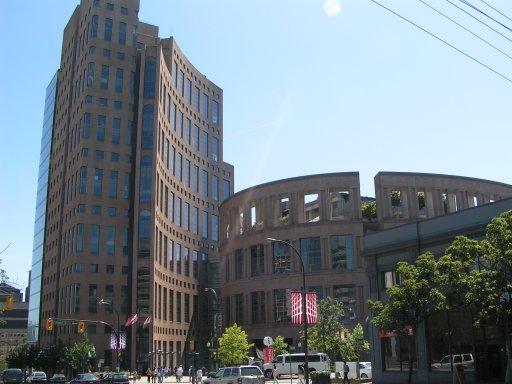
Vancouver Library Square, Vancouver, British Columbia (collaboration with Moshe Safdie)

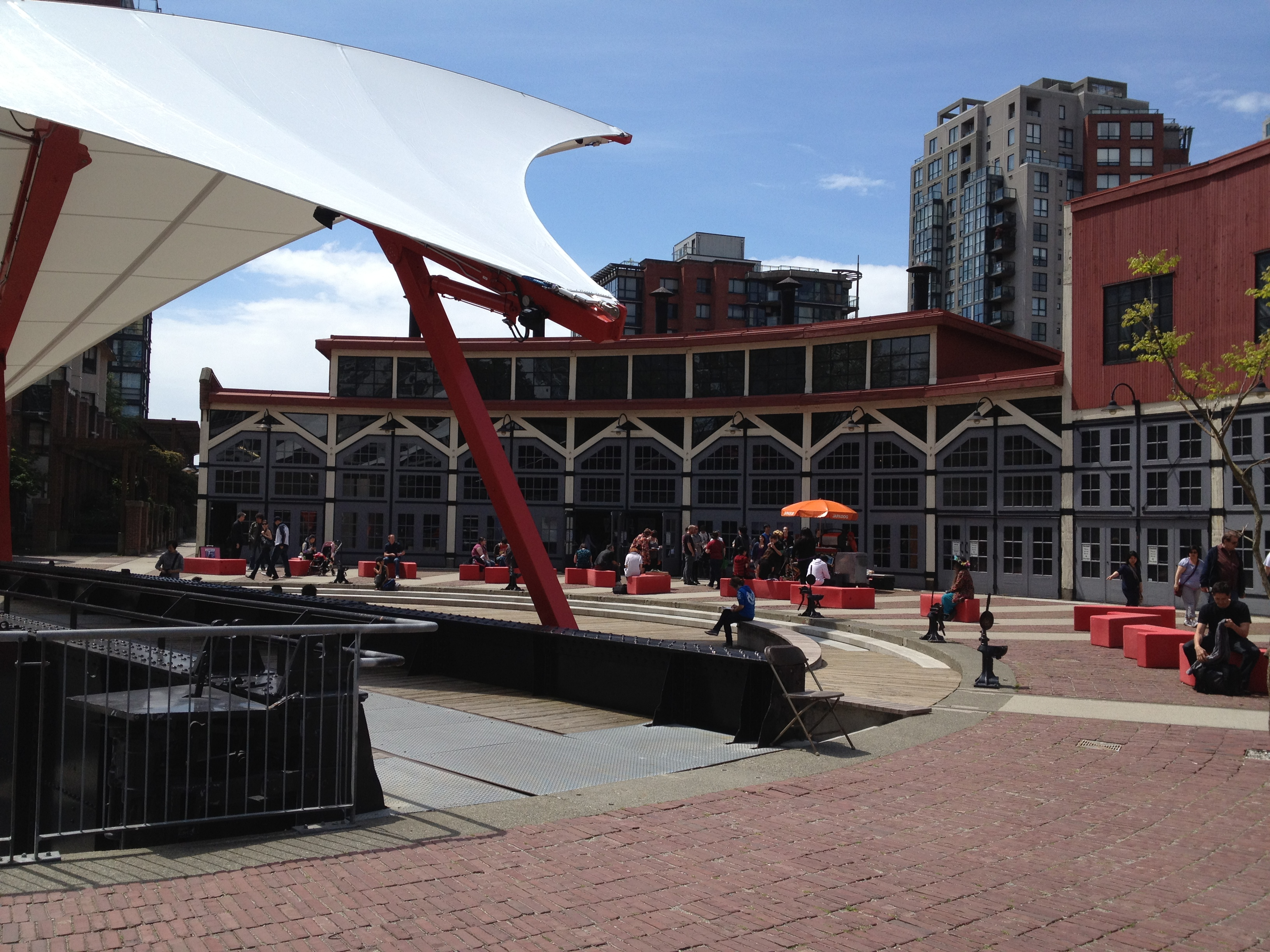
Yaletown Roundhouse, Vancouver, British Columbia
