= Page and Steele =

Page + Steele, formerly known as Page and Steele, is an architecture partnership created in 1926 by Forsey Pemberton B. Page (1885–1970) and W. Harland Steele (1900–1996) in Toronto, Ontario. It is now part of the IBI Group of architectural and engineering firms.

== History ==
Forsey Page was born in Toronto in 1885 and attended the University of Toronto where he received Bachelor of Applied Science and Master of Engineering degrees. He practiced as an architect from 1908 and served in the Canadian Army from 1916 to 1918 during World War I. He retired after 1950 and died in 1970.

Harland W. Steele was born in Stouffville, Ontario in 1900 and graduated from architecture at the University of Toronto in 1925. He retired in 1970 and died in Toronto in 1996.

In the 1950s the firm employed famed architect Peter Dickinson.

== Projects ==
Page and Steele's projects cover the span from 1926 and 1970:

- Forest Hill Public School 1931–32
- Forest Hill North Preparatory School 1936
- Forest Hill Municipal Building 1945
- Wallberg Memorial Chemistry Building, University of Toronto 1946–1948
- Forest Hill Collegiate Institute, Toronto 1948 - Reconstruction in 1992
- Niagara Falls Collegiate and Vocational School 1948
- Page and Steele Head Office, 72 St Clair Avenue (1948)
- British American Oil Building, 800 Bay Street (1949)
- Bay–Wellington Building, 220 Bay Street (1948)
- St. Joseph-Islington High School, Toronto 1950
- The high-rise portion of Regent Park, Toronto early 1950s
- Berkeley House, 360 Bay Street, Toronto (1954)
- 55 Yonge Street (1956)
- Range Road Development/Sun Insurance Building, 48 Yonge Street (1959)
- National Trust Building, 7 King Street East (1961)
- Wexford Collegiate Institute, Toronto 1964
- Montreal Trust Building, 11 King Street West, Toronto (1965)
- East York Collegiate Institute, Toronto 1988 - Reconstruction

== Legacy ==
Most of Page and Steele's projects are in Toronto, but newer ones are under construction outside Canada.

- Trinity Park Lofts, Toronto
- Four Seasons Hotel Group Head Office, Toronto
- Benevenuto Place, Toronto
- O'Keefe Centre, Toronto
- Beth Tzedec Synagogue, Toronto
- Delta Hotel Toronto
- Air Canada Centre Expansion
- Colossus Vaughan
- Maple Leaf Square
- Empress Walk
- Shore Club, Jersey City NJ
- J.W. Marriott and Resort Hotel, Aqaba, Jordan
- Four Seasons Hotel Amman
- Four Seasons Hotel Prague
- Atrium on Bay
- Denison Armoury 1961, demolished 2003
