= John C. Parkin =

Canadian architect

John Cresswell Parkin
- Born: 24 March 1922; Sheffield, Yorkshire
- Died: 22 November 1988 (aged 66); Toronto, Ontario
- Burial place: Riverside Cemetery, Lindsay
- Education: University of Manitoba (BArch 1944); Harvard University (MArch 1947)
- Spouse: Margaret Jeanne Wormith (m. 1948)

John Cresswell Parkin CC OOnt RCA (24 March 1922 – 22 November 1988) was a British-Canadian architect who practised from 1944 to 1987 and worked predominantly in Toronto. In 1947, Parkin co-founded the firm John B. Parkin Associates with partner John Burnett Parkin, who was unrelated. John Cresswell served until 1971 as the firm's head designer. From 1971 until his retirement in 1987, Parkin operated his own firm, Parkin Partnership. Parkin is credited as one of the leaders in the development of modern architecture in Canada during the post-war period.

== Biography ==
John C. Parkin was born on 24 March 1922 in Sheffield, Yorkshire to Thomas Cresswell Parkin II (1886–1967) and Marie Louise Parkin (1892–1971). His parents were distantly related. Thomas was a chartered accountant with Parkin and Co., which had been established in the 1880s.

In 1939, Parkin entered the University of Manitoba and graduated in 1944. Upon graduation, he left for Toronto with fellow graduate Harry Seidler. Parkin took a job with the firm Marani and Morris, and Seidler with William Somerville. Shortly after arriving, Parkin met John B. Parkin. In October 1944, John C. left Marani and Morris to work with John B. The two Parkins decided to form a partnership but realized that the younger partner required additional design training. John C. had been offered several scholarships to Harvard. In January 1946, he left Toronto for Harvard University and graduated a year later.

In January 1947, both Parkins officially formed their partnership, called John B. Parkin Associates. The elder Parkin acted as head of the organization, and the younger acted as design chief. In March 1947, John B.'s younger brother, Edmund T. Parkin, joined the firm as a partner. A landscape architect by trade, his responsibility was handling contracts. The new firm modelled its business approach from that of the firm of the architect Albert Kahn, with clear divisions of tasks by department. The firm's first offices were located at 96 Bloor Street West, a building that was shared with the firm Mathers and Haldenby. After the firm outgrew this space, it moved to 648 Church Street, a converted house. In 1951, it moved again, this time to an office building on 717 Church Street. In 1955, the firm finally settled at an originally-designed office in the new neighbourhood of Don Mills, at 1500 Don Mills Road.

Throughout the 1950s the firm acquired several large commissions including the Salvation Army National Headquarters, a new terminal at the Toronto Airport, and the Don Mills Shopping Centre. By 1960, John B. Parkin Associates had grown to be the largest architectural firm in Canada. On 1 January 1969, the firm merged with Smith Carter Searle Associates and became Parkin Architects Planners. In 1970, he left to form his own firm, which was called Parkin Partnership. The new firm won the 1976 competition for a new building for the National Gallery of Canada although it was unbuilt.

On 26 June 1948, John C. married Margaret Jeanne Wormith (1922–) of Toronto. Wormith was a 1945 graduate of the University of Toronto and also earned a Master of Arts in art history that year from Harvard University. When they met, Wormith was working at the Art Gallery of Toronto (now the Art Gallery of Ontario). The Parkins had three children (John, Geoffrey, and Jennifer) and lived in a home that John C. had designed in the Bridle Path neighbourhood of North York. He died on 22 November 1988 in Toronto.

His records are held at the Canadian Centre for Architecture, in Montreal, as the John C. Parkin fonds and at the University of Calgary's Canadian Architectural Archives as the John B. Parkin/NORR fonds.
