= Thompson Berwick and Pratt and Partners =

- Company type: Private company
- Industry: Architecture
- Founded: Sharp and Thompson, 1908 - 1990
- Founder: G.L.T. Sharp, Charles J. Thompson
- Headquarters: Vancouver, British Columbia, Canada
- Number of employees: 20-50

Thompson Berwick and Pratt and Partners is an architectural firm that was founded in 1908 as Sharp and Thompson. The firm played a substantial role in Vancouver and Canadian Architecture and began as a birthplace for several famous Canadian architects such as Barry Downs, Paul Merrick, Arthur Erickson, and Ron Thom.

Early work was inspired by medieval and classical architecture which included residential, commercial, and institutional, especially several buildings on the University of British Columbia Campus.

Proposed plan of the University of British Columbia from 1914

The firm became known for winning the 1913 international competition for the UBC Point Grey Campus master plan as well as becoming the university's official architecture firm.

Robert A.D. Berwick and Charles Edward Pratt later joined the firm in 1937, which switched the firm's style to European modernism.

The firm helped several successful Canadian Architects, including Barry Downs, Paul Merrick, Arthur Erickson, Ron Thom, and Fred Hollingsworth embark on their careers. It closed in 1990.
