= John B. Parkin =

Canadian architect (1911–1975)

- Born: John Burnett Parkin; 26 June 1911; Toronto, Ontario
- Died: 17 August 1975 (age 64); Los Angeles, California
- Education: University of Toronto (1935)
- Occupation: Architect
- Spouse: Jean Elizabeth Renshaw (m. 1943)
- Practice: John B. Parkin Associates

John Burnett Parkin (26 June 1911 – 17 August 1975) was a Canadian architect. Parkin is best known as the principal of the firm John B. Parkin Associates, which he operated from 1947 to 1968 with partner John C. Parkin (no relation), and which produced the largest body of mid-century modern architecture in Canada.

== Early career ==
After receiving his Dip. Arch. from the University of Toronto in 1935, Parkin moved to London, England, where he worked briefly for the National Coal Board, H.M. Office of Works, and finally the London practice of Howard and Souster. In 1937, he returned to Canada, where he operated in private practice until 1947.

He entered into an architectural practice with John Cresswell Parkin in 1947 and was joined, two months later, by his brother, landscape architect Edmond T. Parkin (1912–1994).

Parkin's records are held at the Canadian Architectural Archives in Calgary as the John B. Parkin/NORR fonds.

== Post Parkin ==
He left Toronto in 1969 and established an office in Los Angeles, where he joined Roy Marshall (a structural engineer) and Lloyd Laity to form Parkin Architects, Engineers & Planners. After his death in 1975, his practice was continued by one of his sons, John B. Parkin Jr. The LA practice was eventually acquired by Cannon Design.

John C. Parkin continued to practise in Canada under various different firm names until, in 1986, under the leadership of Harland C. Lindsay, certain assets of the firm were acquired and Parkin Architects Limited was established. The firm is Canada's leading healthcare architecture practice. It is active in most of Canada's provinces, and in Nunavut, from offices in Vancouver, Toronto and Ottawa.

- John B. Parkin Associates, 1947–1968
- John C. Parkin, 1968–1971
- John C. Parkin Architects Engineers Planners, 1971–1972
- Parkin Architects Engineers Planners, 1972–1976
- Parkin Partnership Architects Planners, 1976–1986
- Parkin Architects Limited, December 17, 1986–Present
- Parkin Consultants Limited, 1988–2011
- Parkin Architects Western Limited, 1998–2002
- Parkin Architects Western Ltd., 2012–Present

Since 1986, there are no longer any Parkins associated with the firm. In 1968 Parkin associate Roy Marshall left to join Neish Owen Rowland Roy (NORR Limited) and was seen as a successor firm, while the name of the firm lives on as Parkin Architects Limited.
