= Ronald Thom =

Canadian architect

- Born: May 15, 1923; Penticton, British Columbia, Canada
- Died: October 29, 1986 (aged 63); Toronto, Ontario
- Education: Vancouver School of Art, Canada
- Occupation: Architect
- Awards: OC
- Practice: Thom Partnership
- Buildings: Massey College and Trent University's riverside campus.

Ronald James Thom, OC (May 15, 1923 – October 29, 1986) was a Canadian architect. He is well known for two works: Massey College and Trent University's riverside campus.

== Early years ==
He was born in Penticton, British Columbia, the son of James Thom and Elena Myrtle Fennel. Thom served as an aviator with the RCAF during World War II, returned and graduated from the Vancouver School of Art in 1947. He never went to architecture school but apprenticed at Thompson, Berwick & Pratt, where he quickly became recognized as an unusually gifted draughtsman and designer. and also designed notable houses in the Vancouver area, several of which won Massey Awards, the country's top award for architecture. In 1957, he became a registered architect at Thompson, Berwick and Pratt and a partner shortly afterward.

== Professional practice ==
He established R.J. Thom & Associates in Toronto in 1963 and later the Thom Partnership. He was a Fellow of the Royal Architectural Institute of Canada. In 1980, he was made an Officer of the Order of Canada. He battled alcoholism throughout his life and was eventually forced out of the partnership by some younger partners. He died at his office in 1986 after a bout of heavy drinking. His ashes were taken back by his family and scattered off the Pacific Ocean at Lighthouse Park in West Vancouver.

He was the subject of a major retrospective exhibition in 2013 and 2014, "Ron Thom and the Allied Arts" featuring a collection of photographs, drawings, letters and furniture that he designed for his buildings. The exhibition was shown in British Columbia in 2013, at the Gardiner Museum in Toronto beginning in February 2014, and at the Beaverbrook Gallery, Fredericton in November 2014.

== Works ==
Building	Year Completed	Architect	Style	Location	Image
Master plan and buildings of Massey College	1963	Ronald Thom	Modern architecture / Medieval Oxbridge College	University of Toronto Toronto, Ontario	
Fraser Residence (Fraser House)	1968 (restoration completed by Altius Architecture in 2001)	Ronald Thom and Paul Merrick (Co-designer)	Modern architecture	4 Old George Place (Rosedale Ravine) Toronto, Ontario	
Catherine Parr Traill College Master plan and renovations of buildings; Champlain College, Lady Eaton College, the Bata Library and science complex on the Symons Campus	1965–1973	Ronald Thom	Modern architecture	Trent University, Peterborough, Ontario	Ron Thom, Trent University (CC: Dieter Janssen) Interior steps of the Bata Library (CC: Dieter Janssen
St. Jude's Cathedral (Iqaluit)	1970	Ronald Thom	Modern architecture	Iqaluit (destroyed 2005)	
Fleming College	1973	Ronald Thom	Modern architecture	Peterborough, Ontario	
Pearson College of the Pacific	1977	Ronald Thom & Barry Vance Downs	Modern architecture	Victoria, British Columbia	
College Education Centre	1982	Ronald Thom	Modern architecture	Nipissing University, Nipissing, Ontario	
Toronto Zoo – master plan and pavilions (including African and Indo-Malaysian Pavilions)	1974	Ronald Thom with Craig & Boake and Clifford & Laurie	Modern architecture	Metropolitan Toronto Zoo, Toronto, Ontario	
Atria North office complex (Phase I), North York	1978–80	Ronald Thom	Modern architecture	2255 Sheppard Avenue East, Toronto, Ontario	
New Shaw Festival Theatre	1973	Ronald Thom	Modern architecture	10 Queen's Parade, Niagara-on-the-Lake, Ontario	
Oakville Centre for the Performing Arts	1977	Ronald Thom	Modern architecture	130 Navy Street, Oakville, Ontario	
The Westin Prince Hotel, Toronto	1975	Ronald Thom	Modern architecture	900 York Mills Road, Toronto, Ontario	
Toronto Metropolitan University Architecture Building	1979–1981	Ronald Thom	Modern architecture	Toronto Metropolitan University 325 Church Street Toronto, Ontario	

== Honours and awards ==
- Fellow, Royal Architectural Institute of Canada
- Member, Royal Canadian Academy of Arts (1973)
- Member, Ontario Association of Architects
- Member, Architectural Institute of British Columbia
- Member, Quebec Association of Architects (1966–1969)
- Honorary Doctorate of Law (LL.D) Trent University 1971
- Honorary Doctorate of Engineering Trent University 1973
- Winner of Design Competition for Massey College, University of Toronto
- Citations of Excellence in Architecture by International College and University Conference and Exposition, 1970
- Toronto Chapter Annual Design Award – 1970
- National Design Council Merit Awards 1971
- Canadian Housing Design Council Award 1971
- Canadian Architect Yearbook Award of Excellence 1974

== Personal ==
Thom was married twice, first to Christine Helen Millard (1923) in 1943 and survived by second wife Molly (m. 1963), daughter Emma (a veterinarian) and son Adam Thom (himself an architect).
