= Royal Architectural Institute of Canada =

Canadian professional architectural association

- Abbreviation: RAIC
- Formation: 1907
- Legal status: Active
- Headquarters: operates remotely
- Region served: Canada
- Members: 5000
- Official language: English, French
- Website: www.raic.org

The Royal Architectural Institute of Canada (RAIC) is a not-for-profit, national organization that has represented architects and architecture since it began operation in 1907. The RAIC is the leading voice for excellence in the built environment in Canada, demonstrating how design enhances the quality of life, while addressing important issues of society through responsible architecture. The RAIC’s mission is to promote excellence in the built environment and to advocate for responsible architecture. The RAIC also has chapters in British Columbia, Alberta and Nova Scotia.

== History ==
RAIC was founded in 1907. It provided a country-level co-ordination among previously-existing provincial architectural groups. Through its journal, the organization provided information to its members about building practices and design considerations in Canada.

In 1948, in anticipation of the confederation of Newfoundland with Canada. Architects there formed the Newfoundland Architects Association, which became a chapter of the RAIC.

After World War II, the RAIC made considerable efforts to develop connections and forums for collaboration between architects and members of related professions, including interior design, arts and crafts. They also worked on developing standards of measurement in the building trades.

In 2000, a study of the organization's Journal showed that the publication had perpetuated gender-based stereotypes about the field of architecture.

In 2006, the RAIC signed on for the 2030 °Challenge, which urges the global architecture community to adopt targets to ensure building practices are carbon-neutral by 2030.

The RAIC presents an annual Conference on Architecture for architects and members to network, earn continuing education credits, and celebrate excellence in architecture. The RAIC also administers a job board and event board for members and the public.

== Membership ==
There are four classes of membership in the RAIC: Members (post-nominal letters MRAIC), Fellows (FRAIC), Honorary Members (Hon. MRAIC), and Honorary Fellows (Hon. FRAIC).

== Awards and honours sponsored by RAIC ==
- RAIC Awards (1930 to 1939)
- Massey Medals for Architecture
- Governor General's Medals in Architecture
- RAIC Advocate for Architecture Award
- RAIC Architectural Journalism & Media Award
- RAIC Architectural Practice Award
- RAIC Awards of Excellence
- RAIC Emerging Architecture Practice Award (previously known as the RAIC Young Architect Award)
- RAIC Foundation Scholarships & Bursaries
- RAIC Gold Medal - their highest honour.
- RAIC International Prize
- RAIC National Urban Design Awards
- RAIC Prix du XXe Siècle
- RAIC Research & Innovation in Architecture Award
- RAIC Student Honour Roll
- RAIC Student Medal

== Leadership ==
- 1907–10 – Alexander Francis Dunlop
- 1910–12 – Francis Spence Baker
- 1912–16 – John Hamilton Gordon Russell
- 1916–18 – Joseph- Pierre Ouellet
- 1918–20 – Alexander Frank Wickson
- 1920–22 – David Robertson Brown
- 1922–24 – Lewis Henry Jordan
- 1924–26 – John Smith Archibald
- 1926–29 – James Patrick Hynes
- 1929–32 – Percy Erskine Nobbs
- 1932–34 – Gordon Mossman West
- 1934–36 – William Sutherland Maxwell
- 1936–38 – William Lyon Somerville
- 1938–40 – Harold Lea Fetherstonhaugh
- 1940–42 – Burwell Ranscier Coon
- 1942–44 – Gordon Macleod Pitts
- 1944–46 – Forsey Pemberton Bull Page
- 1946–48 – David Chas
- 1948–50 – Albert James Hazelgrove
- 1950–52 – J. Roxburgh Smith
- 1952–54 – Robert Schofield Morris
- 1954–56 – Arthur James Carman Paine
- 1956–58 – Douglas Edwin Kertland
- 1958–60 – Maurice Payette
- 1960–62 – Walter Harland Steele
- 1962–64 – John L. Davies
- 1964–65 – Francis Bruce Brown
- 1965–66 – Gérard Venne
- 1966–67 – Charles A. E. Fowler
- 1967–68 – James Elmhurst Searle
- 1968–69 – Norman H. McMurrich
- 1969–70 – William G. Leithead
- 1970–71 – Gordon R. Arnott
- 1971–72 – Jean-Louis Lalonde
- 1972–73 – Cyril Frederic Thomas Rounthwaite
- 1973–74 – Allan F. Duffus
- 1974–75 – Bernard Wood
- 1975–76 – Fred Thornton Hollingsworth
- 1976–77 – Charles H. Cullum
- 1977–78 – W. Donald Baldwin
- 1978–79 – Irving D. Boigon
- 1979–80 – Gilbert R. Beatson
- 1980–81 – David H. Hambleton
- 1981–82 – J. Douglas Miller
- 1982–83 – Gazell Macy DuBois
- 1983–84 – Patrick Blouin
- 1984–85 – W. Kirk Banadyga
- 1985–86 – Brian E. Eldred
- 1986–87 – Rudy P. Friesen
- 1987–88 – Terence J. Williams
- 1988–89 – Alfred C. Roberts
- 1989–90 – Esmail Baniassad
- 1990–91 – Richard Young
- 1991–92 – David W. Edwards
- 1992–93 – Roy Willwerth
- 1993–94 – J. Brian Sim
- 1994–95 – Paul-André Tétreault
- 1995–97 – Bill Chomik
- 1997–98 – Barry J. Hobin
- 1998–99 – Eva Matsuzaki
- 1999–2000 – Eliseo Temprano
- 2000–01 – David Simpson
- 2001–02 – Diarmuid Nash
- 2002–03 – Ronald Keenberg
- 2003–04 – Bonnie Maples
- 2004–05 – Christopher Fillingham
- 2005–06 – Yves Gosselin
- 2006–07 – Vivian Manasc
- 2007–08 – Kiyoshi Matsuzaki
- 2008–09 – Paule Boutin
- 2009–10 – Ranjit K. Dhar
- 2011 – Stuart Howard
- 2012 – David Craddock
- 2013 – Paul E. Frank
- 2014 – Wayne De Angelis
- 2015 – Samuel Óghale Oboh
- 2016 – Allan Teramura
- 2017 – Ewa Bieniecka
- 2017–20 – Michael J. Cox
- 2020–22 – John Brown
- 2022–24 – Jason Robbins

== See also ==
- List of Canadian organizations with royal patronage
- Commonwealth Association of Architects
