= Colin Vaughan =

Television journalist, architect, urban activist and alderman

- Born: 30 June 1931; Sydney, New South Wales, Australia
- Died: 1 January 2000 (aged 68); Toronto, Ontario, Canada
- Occupations: Broadcaster, city councillor, architect
- Employer(s): Citytv; Robbie, Vaughan and Williams
- Spouse: Nettie (separated)
- Partners: Susan Walker; Patricia Marson
- Children: 6; including Adam

Member of the Toronto City Council
- In office 1972–1976

Colin Vaughan (30 June 1931 – 1 January 2000) was an Australian-born Canadian television journalist, architect, urban activist and alderman serving the city of Toronto. He was best known as the political specialist for the Toronto television station Citytv from 1977 until his death.

== Personal life ==
Born in Sydney, Australia, Vaughan studied architecture there before moving to Montreal, Quebec in the 1950s. He then moved to Toronto in the mid-fifties to work at Page and Steele, a noted Toronto firm. There he met Peter Dickinson. In the late fifties he became one of Peter Dickinson's original associates with Dickinson's new firm. In the early sixties he, Rod Robbie, Dick Williams and Fred Ashworth set out on their own. The new firm Ashworth, Robbie, Vaughan and Williams Architects and Planners, teamed with Paul Schoeler of Schoeler, Barkham and Heaton Architects and Planning Consultants, and Matt Stankiewicz of Z. Matthew Stankiewicz Architect, to compete for and would eventually go on to win the competition to build the Canadian Pavilion at Expo 67. Vaughan also worked on the O'Keefe Centre's interior as well as the Inn on the Park and 2 King Street West.

His son Adam Vaughan, a former CBC Television journalist, succeeded him as Citytv's political specialist and was the Member of Parliament (MP) for Spadina—Fort York (2014–2021). His daughter Annabel Vaughan became an architect and another daughter, Polly Vaughan, was the senior editor at another CHUM television station A-Channel Vancouver Island, and currently works for the Government of British Columbia. He has three other children; Thomas who is the associate director of the Ontario Cultural Attractions Fund, Sam who works in the Ontario Court system, and Jenny who is the Vietnam bureau chief for Agence France-Presse (AFP) news agency.

Vaughan died from a heart attack in the early hours of 1 January 2000, at the age of 68.

== Urban activism and politics ==
In the late 1960s, he helped lead the Stop Spadina movement, a citizens' group opposed to inner city expressways in Toronto.

In the 1972 civic election, he was elected to Toronto City Council and in 1974 he was elected to Metro Council. Vaughan was one of several new aldermen elected in 1972 who created a pro-reform, pro-neighbourhood majority on city council under the new reform mayor David Crombie.

== Journalism career ==
After five years on city council, Vaughan left in 1977 to begin a new career as a journalist with Citytv's new local daily news show, CityPulse, covering municipal, provincial, and federal politics. In later decades, he also wrote on municipal politics for The Globe and Mail, the Toronto Star and Toronto Life magazine.
