= Chi Nguyen =

Canadian politician

Chi Nguyen MP

Member of Parliament for Spadina—Harbourfront
- Incumbent
- Assumed office April 28, 2025
- Preceded by: Kevin Vuong

Personal details
- Party: Liberal
- Website: chinguyen.liberal.ca

Chi Thuy Diem Nguyen is a Canadian politician from the Liberal Party of Canada. She was elected Member of Parliament for Spadina—Harbourfront in the 2025 Canadian federal election. She was previously a candidate in the 2022 Ontario general election.

== Education ==
She holds an honours bachelor of arts from McGill University and a master of science in social psychology from the London School of Economics.

== Background and personal life ==
Nguyen is of Vietnamese descent.

Prior to being elected in the 2025 Canadian federal election, Nguyen served as Executive Director at Equal Voice, a charity whose focus is on improving gender representation in Canadian politics.

== Electoral record ==
2025 Canadian federal election: Spadina—Harbourfront
** Preliminary results — Not yet official **
Party	Candidate	Votes	%	±%	Expenditures
Liberal	Chi Nguyen	30,769	59.72	+21.49	
Conservative	Diana Filipova	16,002	31.06	+9.36	
New Democratic	Norm Di Pasquale	3,995	7.75	–26.09	
Green	Gordon Rand	442	0.82	–2.36	
People's	Gilbert Joseph Jubinville	188	0.36	–2.65	
Marxist–Leninist	Nick Lin	83	0.16	N/A	
Independent	Shrey Rao	39	0.08	N/A	
Total valid votes/expense limit					
Total rejected ballots					
Turnout		51,518	64.17		
Eligible voters		80,284			
Liberal notional hold		Swing		+6.07	
Source: Elections Canada

2022 Ontario general election: Spadina—Fort York
Party	Candidate	Votes	%	±%	Expenditures
New Democratic	Chris Glover	15,595	46.06	–3.56	$135,213
Liberal	Chi Nguyen	9,463	27.95	+4.28	$81,726
Progressive Conservative	Husain Neemuchwala	6,221	18.37	–3.41	$14,178
Green	Cara Des Granges	1,902	5.62	+1.97	$1,233
New Blue	Angela Asher	581	1.72	–	$5,875
Stop the New Sex-Ed Agenda	Jan Osko	95	0.28	+0.11	$0
Total valid votes/expense limit		33,857	99.33	–	$139,048
Total rejected, unmarked and declined ballots		230	0.67	–0.15	
Turnout		34,087	34.36	–19.21	
Eligible voters		99,220			
New Democratic hold		Swing		–3.92	
Source: Elections Ontario
