= Otto Joachim =

Otto Joachim may refer to:

- Otto Joachim (composer) (1910–2010), German-born Canadian musician
- Otto Joachim Moltke (1770–1853), Minister of State of Denmark, 1824–1842
