= Adam Vaughan =

Canadian politician (Born: 1961)

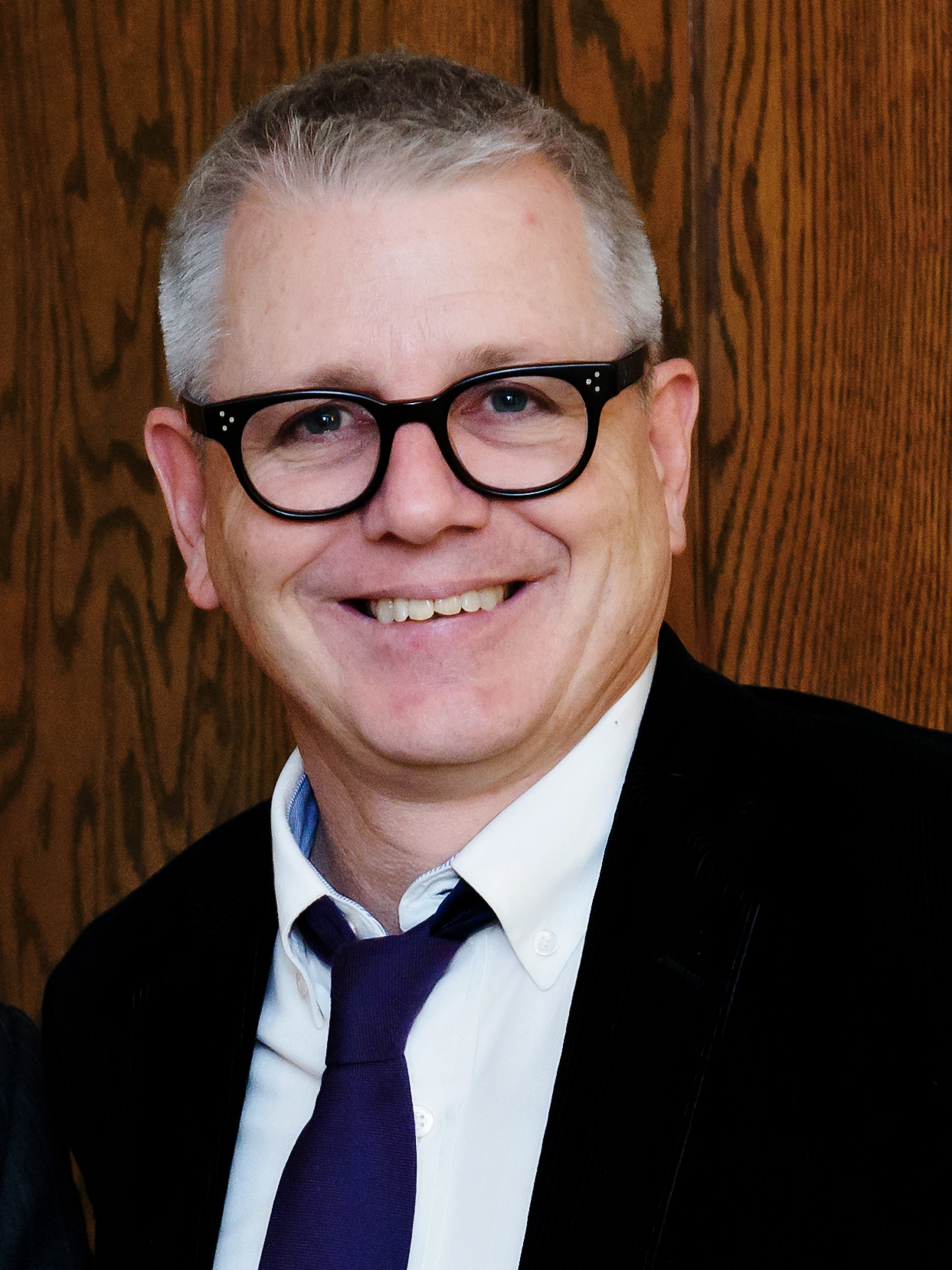
- Vaughan in 2017

Member of Parliament for Spadina—Fort York Trinity—Spadina (2014–2015)
- In office June 30, 2014 – September 20, 2021
- Preceded by: Olivia Chow
- Succeeded by: Kevin Vuong

Toronto City Councillor for Ward 20 Trinity-Spadina
- In office December 1, 2006 – May 13, 2014
- Preceded by: Martin Silva
- Succeeded by: Ceta Ramkhalawansingh

Parliamentary Secretary to the Minister of Families, Children and Social Development (Housing)
- In office January 30, 2017 – September 19, 2021
- Minister: Jean-Yves Duclos; Ahmed Hussen
- Preceded by: Terry Duguid

Parliamentary Secretary to the Prime Minister (Intergovernmental Affairs)
- In office December 2, 2015 – January 27, 2017
- Minister: Justin Trudeau
- Preceded by: Paul Calandra
- Succeeded by: Peter Schiefke

Personal details
- Born: July 3, 1961 (age 65) Toronto, Ontario, Canada
- Party: Liberal (2014–present)
- Occupation: Journalist

Adam G. Vaughan (born July 3, 1961) is a Canadian lobbyist and former politician who was the Toronto city councillor for Ward 20 Trinity—Spadina from 2006 to 2014 and the member of Parliament (MP) from 2014 to 2021. A member of the Liberal Party, Vaughan represented Spadina—Fort York and its predecessor Trinity—Spadina. In May 2025, Vaughan joined Ontario Place spa developer, Therme Group, as a spokesperson and senior advisor. Prior to entering politics, Vaughan worked as a journalist.

During his time as an MP, Vaughan served as the parliamentary secretary to prime minister on intergovernmental affairs from 2015 to 2017, and to the minister of families, children and social development on housing and urban affairs from 2017 to 2021. Prior to his political career, he was a radio and television journalist. In August 2021, Vaughan announced that he would not seek re-election to Parliament.

== Background ==
Vaughan is married to Nicole Anatol and has a son and a daughter from previous relationships. He was previously married to journalist Suhana Meharchand. His father, Colin Vaughan, was a noted architect, television journalist and former city councillor, who was CityTV's political reporter until his death in 2000.

== Media career (1982 – 2006) ==
Adam Vaughan worked at Ryerson Polytechnical Institute's radio station CKLN from 1982 to 1987, and was manager of the station from 1985 to 1987. He joined CITY-TV in 1987 as a producer of CityWide. He left in 1989 to join the board of the World Association of Community Radio Broadcasters.

In 1990, he joined Metro Morning on CBL as a segment producer. He subsequently joined CBLT in 1994, covering City Hall as a municipal reporter, producer, and director. Vaughan has covered Toronto Police Service, Toronto City Hall, Queen's Park and Parliament Hill in his career. He returned to the Citytv team in 2000.

Vaughan has written for Toronto Life magazine and the Toronto Star. Before becoming a journalist, Adam Vaughan was a cartoonist for Books in Canada, Quill and Quire, Canadian Forum and several other publications.

After Marilyn Lastman, the wife of the then mayor of Toronto Mel Lastman, was caught shoplifting from an Eaton's store in Toronto, the mayor threatened to kill Vaughan if he reported on his family.

== Political career (2006 – 2021) ==
=== Municipal politics (2006 – 2014) ===
Vaughan ran in Trinity—Spadina - Ward 20 in the 2006 municipal election. The seat had been vacated by Olivia Chow who left the city for federal politics. He won the seat defeating Helen Kennedy, Chow's executive assistant, by 2,300 votes.

After the 2010 mayoral election, Vaughan was an outspoken critic of then-Toronto Mayor Rob Ford.

As a member of City Council Vaughan sat on the Toronto Police Services Board, the Planning and Growth Management Committee, the Toronto Arts Council, Artscape Board, the Board of Trustees for the Art Gallery of Ontario, and the Harbourfront Centre Board. Additionally he sat on the city's Heritage Board, and the city's Preservation Board.

=== Federal politics (2014 – 2021) ===
In 2014, he ran as the Liberal candidate in a federal by-election to succeed New Democratic Party MP Olivia Chow, who had resigned to run for Mayor of Toronto. At the time. the Liberals had their fewest MPs in history. Vaughan resigned his city council seat on May 13, 2014, several days after the Trinity—Spadina by-election was called. He defeated NDP candidate Joe Cressy by 6,745 votes, a nearly 2-to-1 margin.

Vaughan was quickly promoted to the Liberal front bench as critic for urban affairs and housing.

In the October 2015 federal election, Vaughan ran in Spadina—Fort York, essentially the southern portion of his old riding. His main opponent was Chow, the person who he had replaced twice, first on Toronto City Council and then later as MP. Once the election was called, Vaughan initially trailed Chow in public opinion polls. However, on election day, in part due to a massive surge of Liberal support in Toronto, he defeated Chow convincingly, taking 54.5% of the vote to Chow's 27.4%.

On December 2, 2015, he was appointed the parliamentary secretary to the prime minister for intergovernmental affairs.

In August, 2021, Vaughan announced he would not be seeking re-election in the 2021 Canadian federal election. He was succeeded by Kevin Vuong, who was nominated as a Liberal, but saw party support for him dropped after the revelation of sexual assault charges against Vuong in 2019.

== Post-political career ==
In April 2022, Vaughan became a principal with Navigator Ltd., a Canadian public relations and lobbying firm.

Vaughan endorsed Karina Gould in the 2025 Liberal Party of Canada leadership election.

In May 2025, Vaughan became a senior advisor and spokesperson for the Therme Canada project on Toronto's waterfront. As an MP, Vaughan had previously opposed Premier Doug Ford's proposed commercial redevelopment of Ontario Place in 2019.

== Electoral record ==
=== Federal elections ===
2019 Canadian federal election: Spadina—Fort York
Party	Candidate	Votes	%	±%	Expenditures
Liberal	Adam Vaughan	33,822	55.8	+1.14	$100,040.70
New Democratic	Diana Yoon	12,188	20.1	-7.18	$35,526.97
Conservative	Frank Fang	10,680	17.6	+1.87	none listed
Green	Dean Maher	3,174	5.2	+3.14	none listed
People's	Robert Stewart	672	1.1	-	none listed
Independent	Marcela Ramirez	114	0.2	-	none listed
Total valid votes/expense limit		60,650	100.0		
Total rejected ballots		339			
Turnout		60,989	67.7		
Eligible voters		90,022			
Liberal hold		Swing		+4.16	
Source: Elections Canada

2015 Canadian federal election: Spadina—Fort York
Party	Candidate	Votes	%	±%	Expenditures
Liberal	Adam Vaughan	30,141	54.66	▲30.27	–
New Democratic	Olivia Chow	15,047	27.28	▼22.36	–
Conservative	Sabrina Zuniga	8,673	15.73	▼5.13	–
Green	Sharon Danley	1,137	2.06	▼2.11	–
PACT	Michael Nicula	91	0.17	–	–
Marxist–Leninist	Nick Lin	59	0.11	–	–
Total valid votes/expense limit		55,148	100.0		$205,892.35
Total rejected ballots		268	0.48	–	
Turnout		55,416	73.93	–	
Eligible voters		74,958			
Source: Elections Canada

Canadian federal by-election, June 30, 2014: Trinity—Spadina Resignation of Olivia Chow
Party	Candidate	Votes	%	±%
Liberal	Adam Vaughan	18,547	53.66	+30.27
New Democratic	Joe Cressy	11,802	34.14	−20.37
Conservative	Benjamin Sharma	2,022	5.85	−10.96
Green	Camille Labchuk	1,880	5.44	+1.06
Christian Heritage	Linda Groce-Gibbons	174	0.50	–
Independent	John "The Engineer" Turmel	141	0.41	–
Total valid votes/expense limit		34,566	99.68	–
Total rejected ballots		111	0.32	−0.14
Turnout		34,677	31.45	−33.50
Eligible voters		110,252		
Liberal gain from New Democratic		Swing		+25.32
By-election due to the resignation of Olivia Chow to run in the 2014 Toronto mayoral election.
Source: Elections Canada

=== Municipal elections ===
2010 Toronto election, Ward 20
Candidate	Votes	%
Adam Vaughan	16,486	74.523%
Mike Yen	3,601	16.278%
Dean Maher	1,233	5.574%
Roman Polochansky	487	2.201%
Ken Osadchuk	315	1.424%
Total	22,122	100%

2006 Toronto election, Ward 20
Candidate	Votes	%
Adam Vaughan	7,834	51.7
Helen Kennedy	5,334	35.2
Desmond Cole	750	4.9
Chris Ouellette	375	2.5
Joseph Tuan	359	2.4
Devendra Sharma	231	1.5
Douglas Lowry	193	1.3
Carmin Priolo	91	0.6
