= Canadian Pavilion =

Pavilion at Expo 67 in Montreal, Quebec

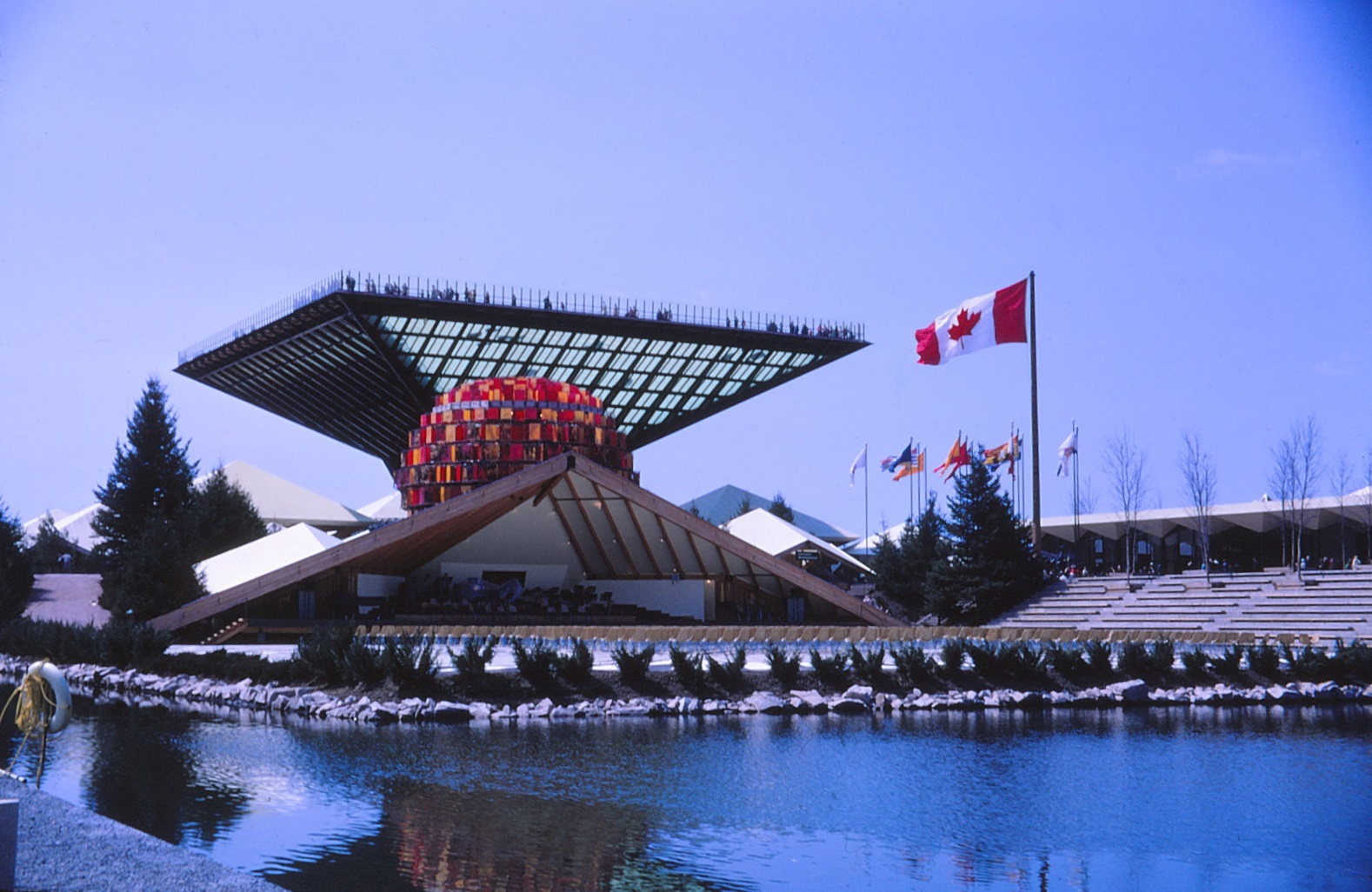
Canadian Pavilion, Expo 67.

The Canadian Pavilion at Expo 67 in Montreal featured an inverted pyramid structure as well as a walk through an attraction called the "People Tree." The pavilion had its highest single-day attendance on Canada Day (July 1), 1967.

The pavilion's large inverted pyramid was called Katimavik, which is the Inuit word for "Gathering Place". The pyramid was nine storeys tall and supported by four columns. The building at its base housed a rotating theatre, which used moving wedge-shaped chambers to bring audiences from one screening to the next, making a complete revolution every half-hour. Smaller linked pyramids at ground level housed the exhibits "The Land of Canada," "The Growth of Canada" and "The Challenge to Canadians and Canada and the World." The pavilion was located on a 7½ acre (30,285 sq metre) lot near the southern end of Notre Dame Island. It cost $24 million to build. The inverted pyramid was a 1000-ton structure, with a hollow steel frame. Open to the sky, its four inner sloping walls featured giant sculptures of a sun dial, hour glass, compass and Kyogen and Haida masks.

== Design and construction ==
Expo chief architect Édouard Fiset had initially insisted the Canadian Pavilion be much smaller, confined to a single acre. Architect Rod Robbie felt strongly that as the host country Canada's pavilion had to have the largest site on the fair, demanding 11.5 acres. Robbie's vision was ultimately successful thanks to the support of federal minister Mitchell Sharp as well as Canadian Pavilion commissioner H. Leslie Brown.

The inverted pyramid shape of the pavilion came about by chance. Robbie and his team were smokers, and while working with cardboard boxes as models for planned pavilion structures, someone placed a large, green, inverted pyramid-shaped ashtray, amidst the boxes. That became the inspiration for Katimavik.

== Architects ==
The Canadian Pavilion was designed by architects Rod Robbie and Colin Vaughan of the firm Ashworth, Robbie, Vaughan and Williams Architects and Planners, Paul Schoeler of Schoeler, Barkham and Heaton Architects and Planning Consultants, and Matt Stankiewicz of Z. Matthew Stankiewicz Architect, with consulting architects Evans St. Gelais and Arthur Erickson. According to Robbie, his firm was selected over such competitors as John C. Parkin and Arcop.

== People Tree ==
The People Tree in front of the pavilion was composed of images of Canadians printed on orange and red nylon sheets, with the colour representing a maple tree in autumn leaf colour. Sixty feet in height, the People Tree consisted of a thousand such "leaves," with half bearing silk screened images of Canadians at work and play. The tree was accessed via a spiral staircase.

== Other structures ==
To the northeast of the main pavilion, an Arts Centre featured a 500-seat theatre, a displays of art and handicrafts, and a reference library. The theater featured a custom-built Casavant Frères organ, upon which daily free concerts were played by leading Canadian organists including Kenneth Gilbert, Françoise Aubut-Pratte, Hugh McLean, Charles Peaker, H. Hugh Bancroft, Antoine Bouchard, and Raymond Daveluy.

The site also had a Children's Creative Centre, and a restaurant, "La Toundra". The Canadian composer Otto Joachim composed a four-channel electroacoustic music composition that was played throughout the period of Expo 67.

== Cuban territory ==
During the negotiations for the release of James Cross, the Canadian Pavilion was declared an extension of the Cuban consulate in Montreal.
