= Chris Glover =

Canadian politician (born 1961)

Chris Glover MPP
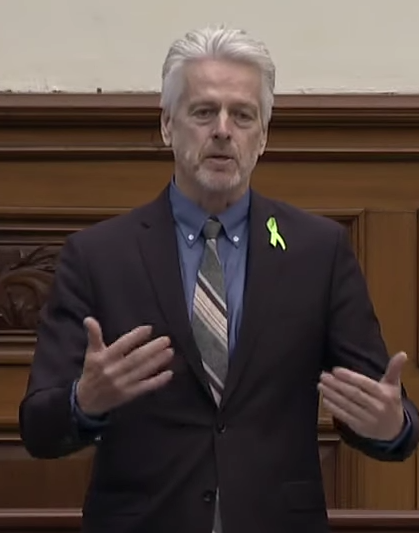

Critic, Sport, Technology, Innovation and Democratic Reform
- Incumbent
- Assumed office April 8, 2025
- Leader: Marit Stiles

Critic, Democratic Reform
- In office March 29, 2023 – February 27, 2025
- Leader: Marit Stiles

Critic, Small Business
- In office July 13, 2022 – March 29, 2023
- Leader: Peter Tabuns (interim) and Marit Stiles

Critic, Technology, Development, and Innovation
- In office February 1, 2021 – February 27, 2025
- Leader: Andrea Horwath, Peter Tabuns (interim), and Marit Stiles

Critic, Colleges and Universities
- In office August 23, 2018 – February 1, 2021
- Leader: Andrea Horwath

Member of Parliament for Spadina—Fort York
- Incumbent
- Assumed office June 7, 2018
- Preceded by: Han Dong (Trinity-Spadina)

Toronto Public School Trustee for (Ward 2) Etobicoke Centre
- In office December 1, 2010 – June 2018
- Preceded by: John Campbell
- Succeeded by: Daniel MacLean

Personal details
- Born: September 4, 1961 (age 64) Oshawa, Ontario, Canada
- Party: New Democratic
- Occupation: Professor

Christopher Charles Glover (born September 4, 1961) is a Canadian politician who was elected to the Legislative Assembly of Ontario in the 2018 provincial election. He represents the electoral district of Spadina—Fort York as a member of the Ontario New Democratic Party.

Prior to his election to the legislature, Glover was an adjunct professor in social sciences at York University and twice-elected trustee with the Toronto District School Board for Etobicoke-Centre. He earned a doctorate in education from the University of Toronto the same year he became a legislator.

On August 23, 2018, Official Opposition leader Andrea Horwath named Glover to serve as Critic for Colleges and Universities. As of August 11, 2024, he serves as the Official Opposition critic for Technology, Development and Innovation, and Democratic Reform.

== Electoral record ==
2025 Ontario general election: Spadina—Fort York
Party	Candidate	Votes	%	±%	Expenditures
New Democratic	Chris Glover	20,441	45.00	–1.06	$118,413
Liberal	April Engelberg	14,331	31.55	+3.60	$66,757
Progressive Conservative	Omar Farhat	9,139	20.12	+1.75	$6,156
Green	Patrick Macklem	1,220	2.69	–2.93	$6,858
None of the Above	Ron Shaw	293	0.65	N/A	$0
Total valid votes/expense limit		45,424	99.14	–0.19	$175,818
Total rejected, unmarked, and declined ballots		392	0.86	+0.19	
Turnout		45,816	43.31	+8.96	
Eligible voters		105,786			
New Democratic hold		Swing		–2.33	
Source: Elections Ontario

2022 Ontario general election: Spadina—Fort York
Party	Candidate	Votes	%	±%	Expenditures
New Democratic	Chris Glover	15,595	46.06	−3.56	$135,213
Liberal	Chi Nguyen	9,463	27.95	+4.28	$81,726
Progressive Conservative	Husain Neemuchwala	6,221	18.37	−3.41	$14,178
Green	Cara Des Granges	1,902	5.62	+1.97	$1,233
New Blue	Angela Asher	581	1.72		$5,875
Stop the New Sex-Ed Agenda	Jan Osko	95	0.28	+0.11	$0
Total valid votes/expense limit		33,857	99.32	+0.15	$139,048
Total rejected, unmarked, and declined ballots		230	0.68	-0.15	
Turnout		34,087	34.35		
Eligible voters		99,325			
New Democratic hold		Swing		−3.92	
Source(s): "Summary of Valid Votes Cast for Each Candidate" (PDF). Elections Ontario. 2022. Archived from the original on 2023-05-18.; "Statistical Summary by Electoral District" (PDF). Elections Ontario. 2022. Archived from the original on 2023-05-21.

2018 Ontario general election: Spadina—Fort York
Party	Candidate	Votes	%	±%
New Democratic	Chris Glover	24,677	49.62	+22.91
Liberal	Han Dong	11,770	23.67	-24.64
Progressive Conservative	Iris Yu	10,834	21.79	+3.33
Green	Rita Bilerman	1,815	3.65	-2.33
Libertarian	Erik Malmholt	278	0.56	
None of the Above	Adam Nobody	271	0.54	
Stop the New Sex-Ed Agenda	Queenie Yu	86	0.17	
Total valid votes		49,731	99.17	
Total rejected, unmarked and declined ballots		415	0.83	
Turnout		50,146	53.56	
Eligible voters		93,622		
New Democratic pickup new district.				
Source: Elections Ontario

2014 Toronto District School Board Trustee election: Ward 2 (Etobicoke Centre)
Candidate	Votes	%
Chris Glover	11,665	44.40
Elizabeth McKinlay	7,653	29.13
Stephen Thiele	6,371	24.25
Suban Abdullahi	1,582	6.02

2010 Toronto District School Board Trustee election: Ward 2 (Etobicoke Centre)
Candidate	Votes	%
Chris Glover	9,881	42.79
Wayne Chen	3,992	17.29
Stephen Thiele	3,741	16.20
Kaydee Richmond	1,640	7.10
John Kapralos	1,443	6.25
Maya Worsoff	1,124	4.87
Ron Jaicarran	734	3.18
Husein Kirefu	538	2.33
