= Rod Robbie =

Canadian architect and planner

Rod Robbie OC
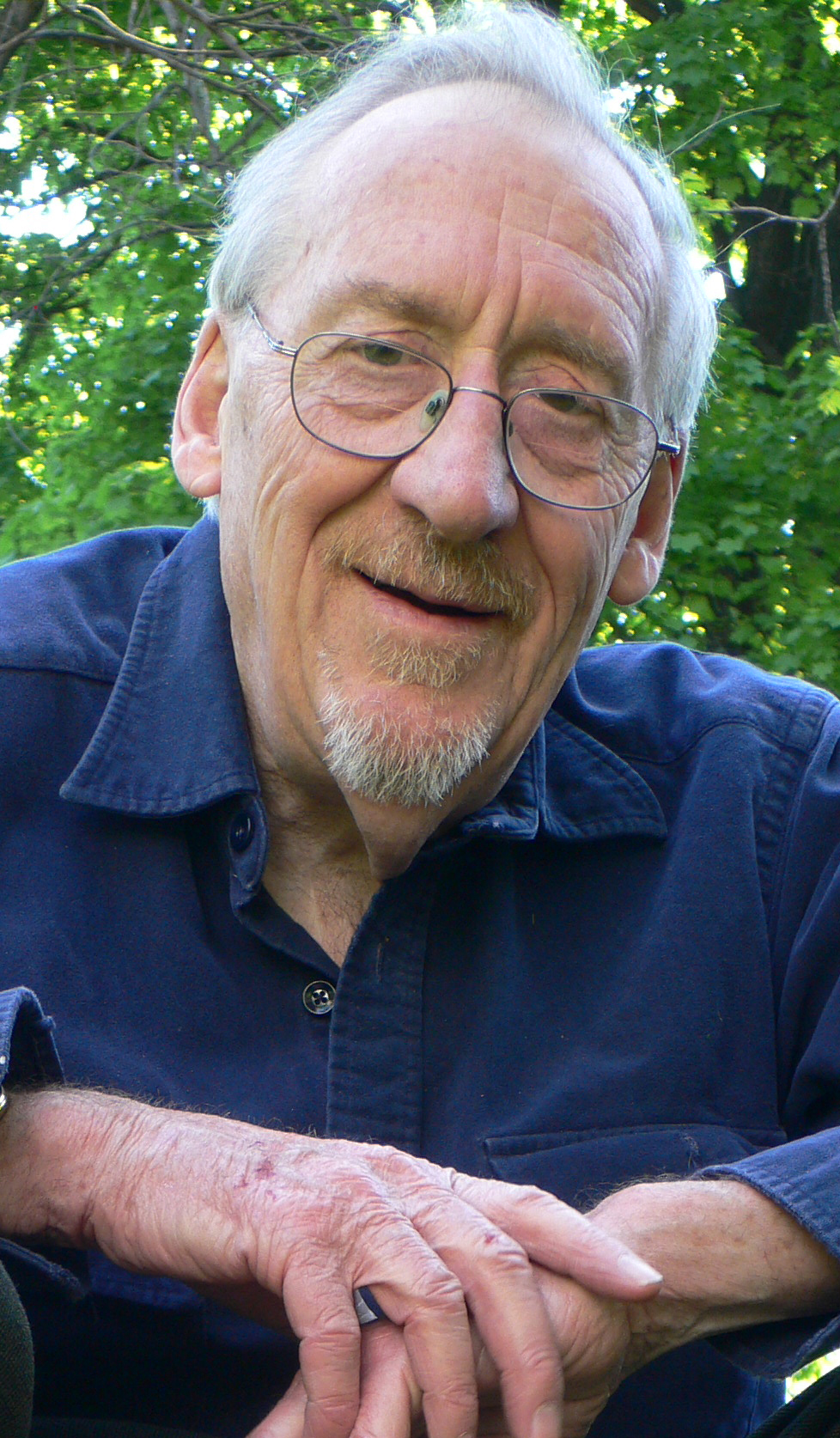
- Rod Robbie 2007
- Born: September 15, 1928; Poole, Dorset, England
- Died: January 4, 2012 (aged 83); Toronto, Ontario, Canada
- Occupation: Architect
- Awards: Order of Canada
- Practice: Robbie Young + Wright / IBI Group Architects
- Buildings: Rogers Centre • Canadian Pavilion, Expo 67

Roderick George Robbie OC (September 15, 1928 – January 4, 2012) was a British-born Canadian architect and planner. He was known for his design of the Canadian Pavilion at Expo 67 and Toronto's Rogers Centre (SkyDome).

== Biography and personal life ==
Roderick Robbie was born in Poole, England on September 15, 1928. He studied architecture and town planning at Regent Street Polytechnic School in London (now known as the University of Westminster).

Robbie served his UK National Service in the 42 Engineer Regiment of the Royal Engineers of the British Army from 1947 to 1949 in the United Kingdom and Egypt. He began his professional career with British Railways in 1951.

He emigrated to Ottawa, Canada in 1956 with his wife Enid Robbie (née Wheeler) and infant daughter, and worked initially for the federal government in Public Works.

He left public service just weeks after arrival to enter the private sector with the firm of Belcourt & Blair. In 1959 he became an associate at Peter Dickinson Associates leading such projects as the New Town at Frobisher Bay (now Iqaluit).

Roderick and Enid Robbie (née Wheeler) participated during the period of 1956 to 1983 actively in the movements to ban the use of atomic weapons (1950s); the setting-up of the New Party Club, constituency work for the New Democratic Party in Ottawa (1960s); constituency work for the Liberal Party (1970s and 1980s) in Toronto.

Since the early 1980s they were politically inactive and concentrated on scholarship. Enid died on their 49th wedding anniversary, December 20, 2001. She was survived by their three daughters and a son.

== Career ==
In the mid-1960s he collaborated in the design of the Canadian Government Pavilion at Expo 67 in Montreal. The distinctive main building in the complex, a large inverted pyramid called the Katimavik, Inuit word for "Gathering Place", was designed by Robbie and Colin Vaughan of the firm Ashworth, Robbie, Vaughan and Williams Architects and Planners; Paul Schoeler of Schoeler, Barkham and Heaton Architects and Planning Consultants; and Matt Stankiewicz of Z. Matthew Stankiewicz Architect, with consulting architects Evans St. Gelais and Arthur Erickson.

Expo chief architect Édouard Fiset had initially insisted the Canadian Pavilion be much smaller, confined to a single acre. Robbie felt strongly that Canada's pavilion had to have the largest site on the fair, demanding 11.5 acres. His vision was ultimately successful thanks to the support of federal minister Mitchell Sharp as well as Canadian Pavilion commissioner H. Leslie Brown.

In the early 1980s Robbie teamed with structural engineer Michael Allen of the firm Adjeleian, Allen Rubeli Ltd. and Bill Neish of NORR Architects and Planners forming the Robbie Adjeleian NORR Consortium (RAN Consortium), to compete for the Ontario Stadium Project, which would later become the SkyDome. Robbie and Allen’s patented winning design established the viability of multi-use retractable roofed stadiums worldwide and lead to a renaissance of the idea of the downtown stadium across North America. Now known as the Rogers Centre, the stadium continues to be an icon of the Toronto landscape hosting hundreds of events per year. Their retractable roof design has continued to function as designed, opening and closing under computer control in 20 minutes.

Later prominent projects included the Seymour Schulich Building at York University designed by Siamak Hariri and Robbie/Young & Wright Architects Inc. It was awarded the Governor General's Medal in Architecture in 2006.

In 2004 work was completed on the Sharp Centre for Design at OCAD University, designed by architect Will Alsop, and Robbie/Young + Wright Architects Inc. The expansion and redevelopment has received numerous awards, including the first Royal Institute of British Architects Worldwide Award, the award of excellence in the "Building in Context" category at the Toronto Architecture and Urban Design Awards, and was deemed the most outstanding technical project overall in the 2005 Canadian Consulting Engineering Awards.

Robbie was a founding member of the Construction Industry Development Council of the Government of Canada and spent many years as a member and chairing committees of the Canadian Standards Association on Systems and Industrialised Building and other professional and technical organisations.

Robbie was the Chairman Emeritus of Robbie Young + Wright / IBI Group Architects and was Partner-in-Charge on many of the firm’s largest and most complex projects.

== Honours ==
In 1989, he was made a Fellow of the Royal Architectural Institute of Canada.

In 2001, he was awarded an honorary doctorate from Dalhousie University.

In 2004, he was made an Officer of the Order of Canada as "an architect known for his innovation."

== Education and professional awards ==
- Diploma in Architecture - Honours, Regent Street Polytechnic (University of Westminster), London, England, 1950
- Diploma in Town Planning, Regent Street Polytechnic (University of Westminster), London, England, July 1954
- Engineering News Record - Construction Man of The Year, 1969
- Royal Canadian Institute for the Toronto SkyDome, Life Member, 1989
- Royal Canadian Academy of Arts in the Art of Architecture, Academician, February 13, 1990
- Quaternario 90: International Award for Innovative Technology in Architecture, SkyDome, 1990
- Tau Sigma Delta, Kent State University for Outstanding Professional Achievement in Architecture, Silver Medal Award, March 15, 1993
- Ryerson Polytechnic University Fellowship for Exemplary Achievements in Architectural Design, Fellow, June 22, 1995
- Dalhousie University, May 2001, Doctor of Laws honoris causa
- The Order of da Vinci of the Ontario Association of Architects (for exceptional leadership in the profession, education and/ or service to the profession and community), May 10, 2003

== Experience ==
- 2008-2012 - Robbie Young + Wright/ IBI Group Architects, Toronto, ON, Chairman Emeritus
- 2004-2008 - Robbie/ Young + Wright Architects Inc., Toronto, ON, Chairman Emeritus
- 1993-2004 - Robbie/ Sane Architects Inc., Toronto, ON, President
- 1991-1992 - Robbie Sane/ Lambur Scott Architects in Joint Venture, Toronto, ON, Partner
- 1987-2004 - Robbie/ Young + Wright Architects Inc., Toronto, ON, President
- 1987-2008 - RAN International Architects & Engineers, Toronto and Ottawa, ON, President
- 1986-1989 - Robbie Adjeleian NORR Consortium (RAN Consortium), ON, Partner
- 1985-1993 - Robbie Architects Inc., Toronto, ON, President
- 1980-1985 - Robbie Architects Planners, Toronto, ON, President
- 1977-1980 - Robbie Williams Kassum Partnership; Architects and Planners, Toronto, ON, Partner
- 1974-1977 - Robbie Williams Kassum Young Partnership; Architects and Planners, Toronto, ON, Partner
- 1972-1974 - Robbie Williams Partnership; Architects and Planners, Toronto, ON, Partner
- 1965-1972 - Robbie Vaughan & Williams, Toronto, ON, Partner
- 1961-1965 - Ashworth Robbie Vaughan & Williams, Toronto, ON, Partner
- 1959-1961 - Peter Dickinson Associates, Ottawa, ON, Associate
- 1956-1959 - Belcourt & Blair, Architects & Town Planners, Ottawa, ON, Junior Partner
- 1951-1956 - Parnell + Robbie, Chartered Architects, London, England, Partner
- 1950-1956 - British Railways, London, England, Junior to Senior Assistant Architect

== Memberships ==
- Appointed an Officer of the Order of Canada, May 3, 2003
- The American Institute of Architects - Member, October 8, 2002
- Certified by the National Council of Architectural Registration Boards - August 5, 1998 (Retired)
- The University of the State of New York, Licensee, 1996
- Canadian Institute of Planners, Member, May 13, 1974
- SEF: Metropolitan Toronto School Board, Study of Education Facilities, Technical Director, 1966 - 1969
- Royal Architectural Institute of Canada - Fellow, June 23, 1989 (Member September 21, 1962) (Life Member)
- Town Planning Institute of Canada, Member, January 12, 1961
- Ontario Association of Architects - Member, 1957 (Retired Life Member)
- Architects Registration Board (UK) - Registrant, 1951 (Retired)
- Royal Institute of British Architects - Member, July 3, 1951 (Retired Charter Life Member)
- SEF Advisory Committee and SEF Consultant on Systems Building, Past Member
- Construction Industry Development, Council of the Government of Canada Past and Founding Member
- CSA Standards Steering Committee on Industrialized Building Construction, Past Chairman
- CSA Advisory Committee on Systems Building, Past Chairman
- Canadian Construction Industry Research Board, Past Member
- Ontario Professional Planners Institute - Member (Retired), 23 February 1995

== Major architectural competitions won and/or built ==
- Canadian Government Pavilion Expo '67, Montreal, Quebec, Canada with Paul Schoeler and Matthew Stankiewicz (ARVW), 1963
- Metropolitan Toronto School Board's Study of Educational Facilities, Toronto, Ontario, Canada (SEF) (RVW), 1966
- Public Works Canada and Energy, Mines and Resources, National Low Energy Building Design Awards Competition. Large Buildings Category, with Arun Sane. First Prize (RVWKP), Ottawa, Ontario, Canada 1980
- Ontario Stadium Project (SkyDome), Toronto, Ontario, Canada, with Michael Allen (RAN Consortium), 1985
- Industrial Research & Development Institute, Midland, Ontario, Canada (RSA), 1996
- Toronto Island Public/ Natural Science School, Toronto, Ontario, Canada (RSA), 1996
- Taipei City Sports Dome, Taipei, Taiwan (RAN International), 1996
- NY Mets, New Shea Stadium, New York USA (RAN International), 1996
- Weldstation, Frankfurt, Germany (RAN International) 1995
- King Fahd International Stadium, Jeddah, Saudi Arabia (RAN International), 1992
- NYC 2008 & 2012 Olympic Stadiums, New York USA (RAN International), 2001 and 2004

== Works ==
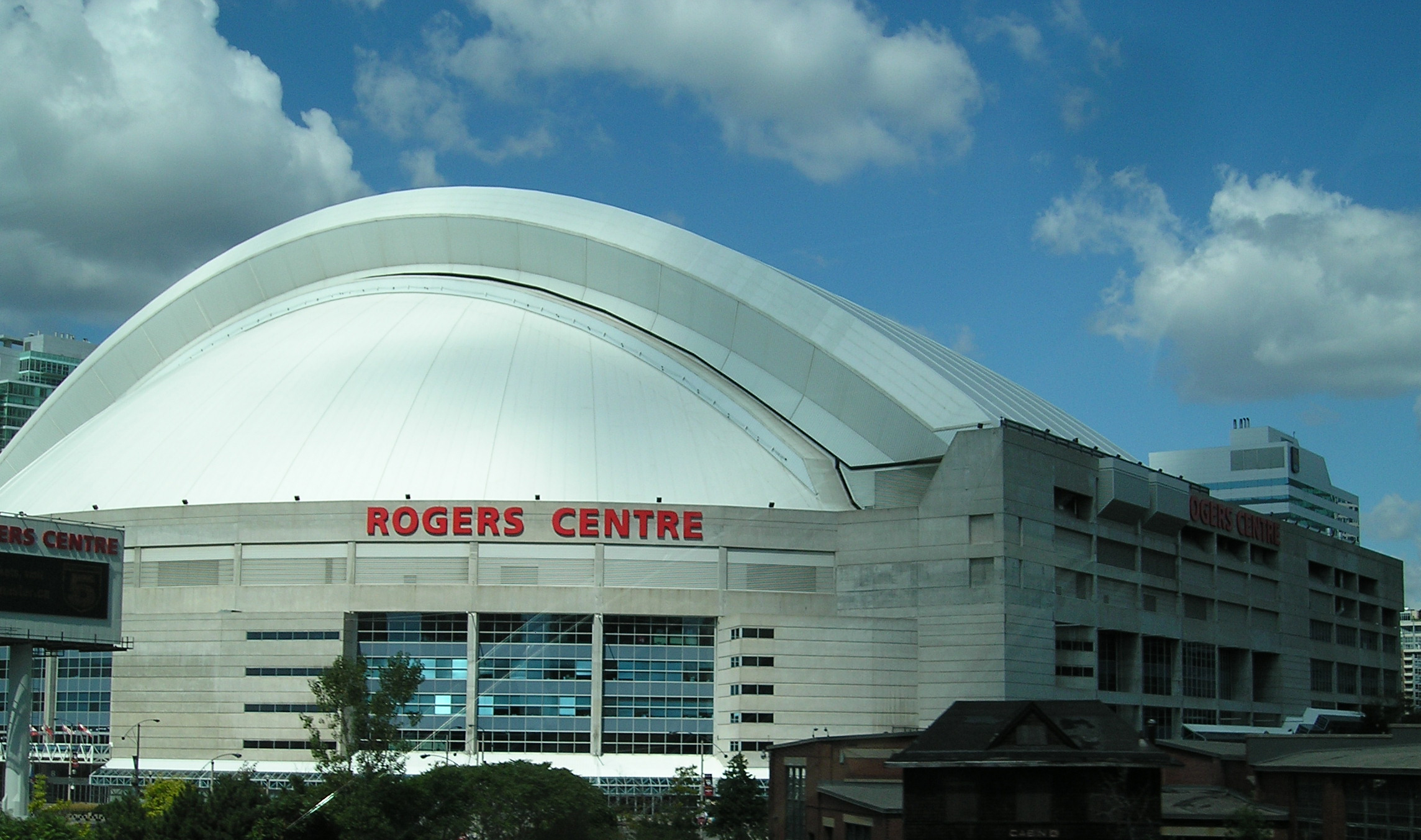
Rogers Centre, Toronto, Ontario

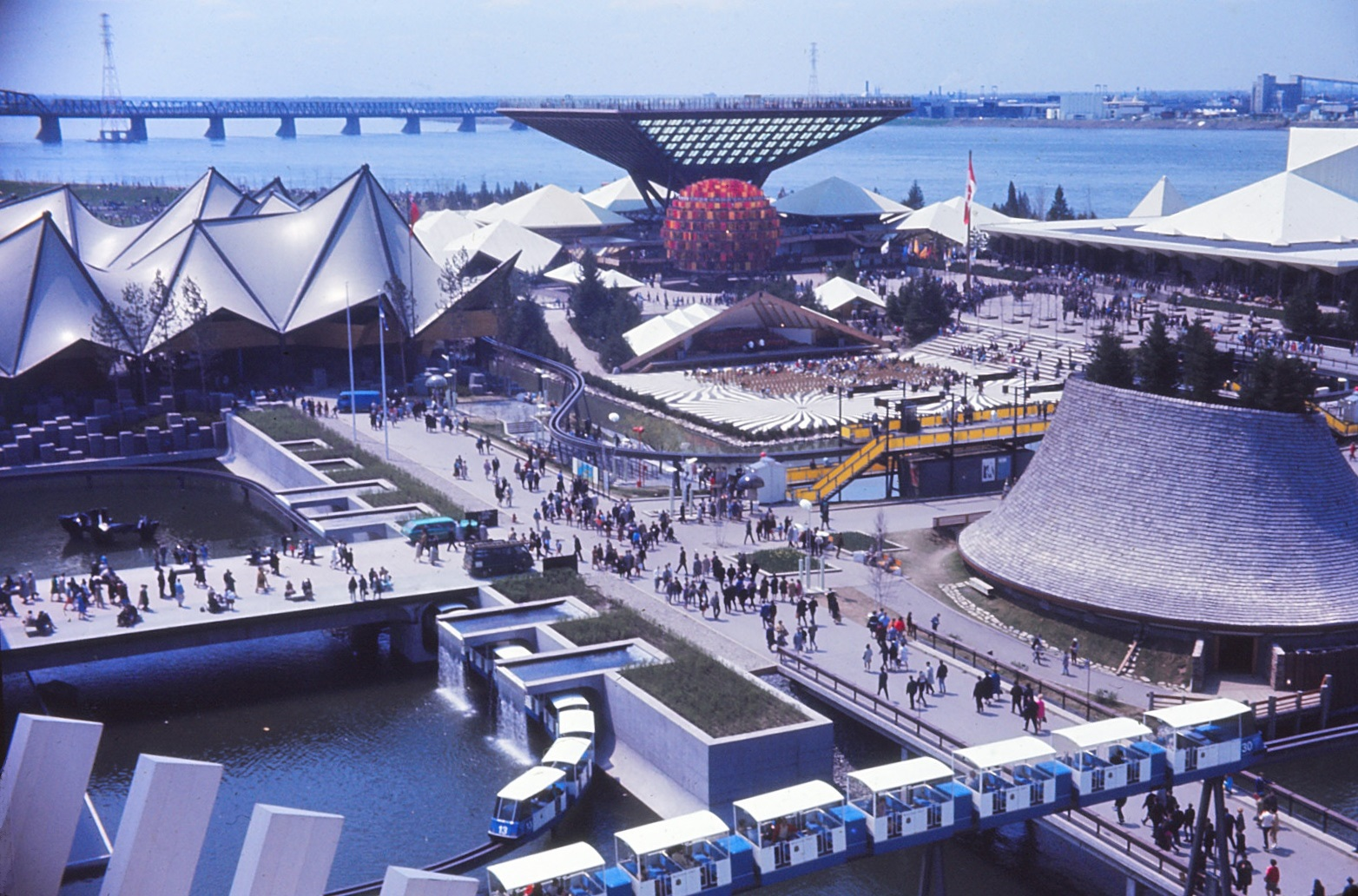
Expo 67, pavillons Ontario, Canada, Provinces-de-l'Ouest, et le Minirail.

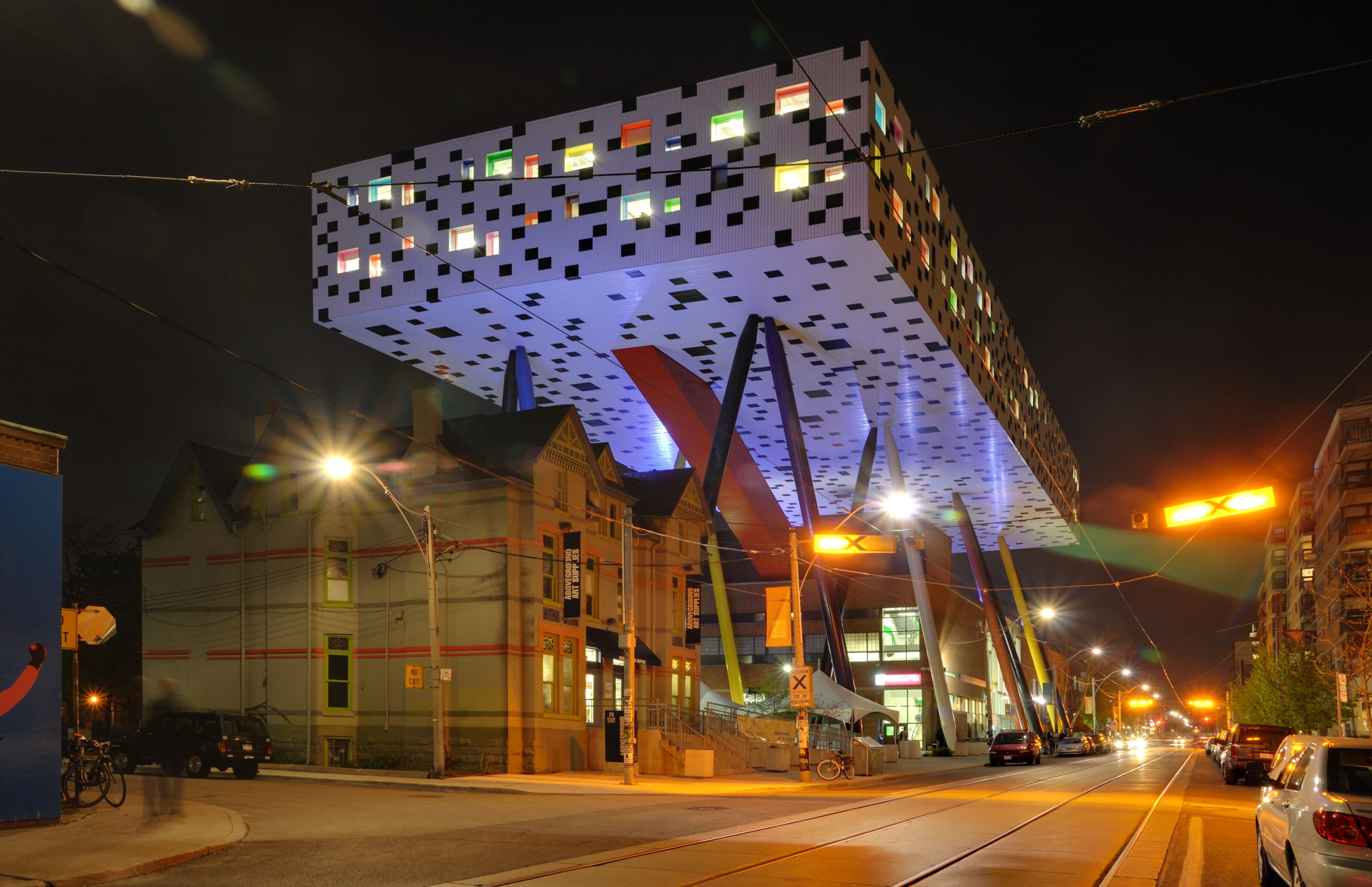
OCAD University, Toronto, Ontario

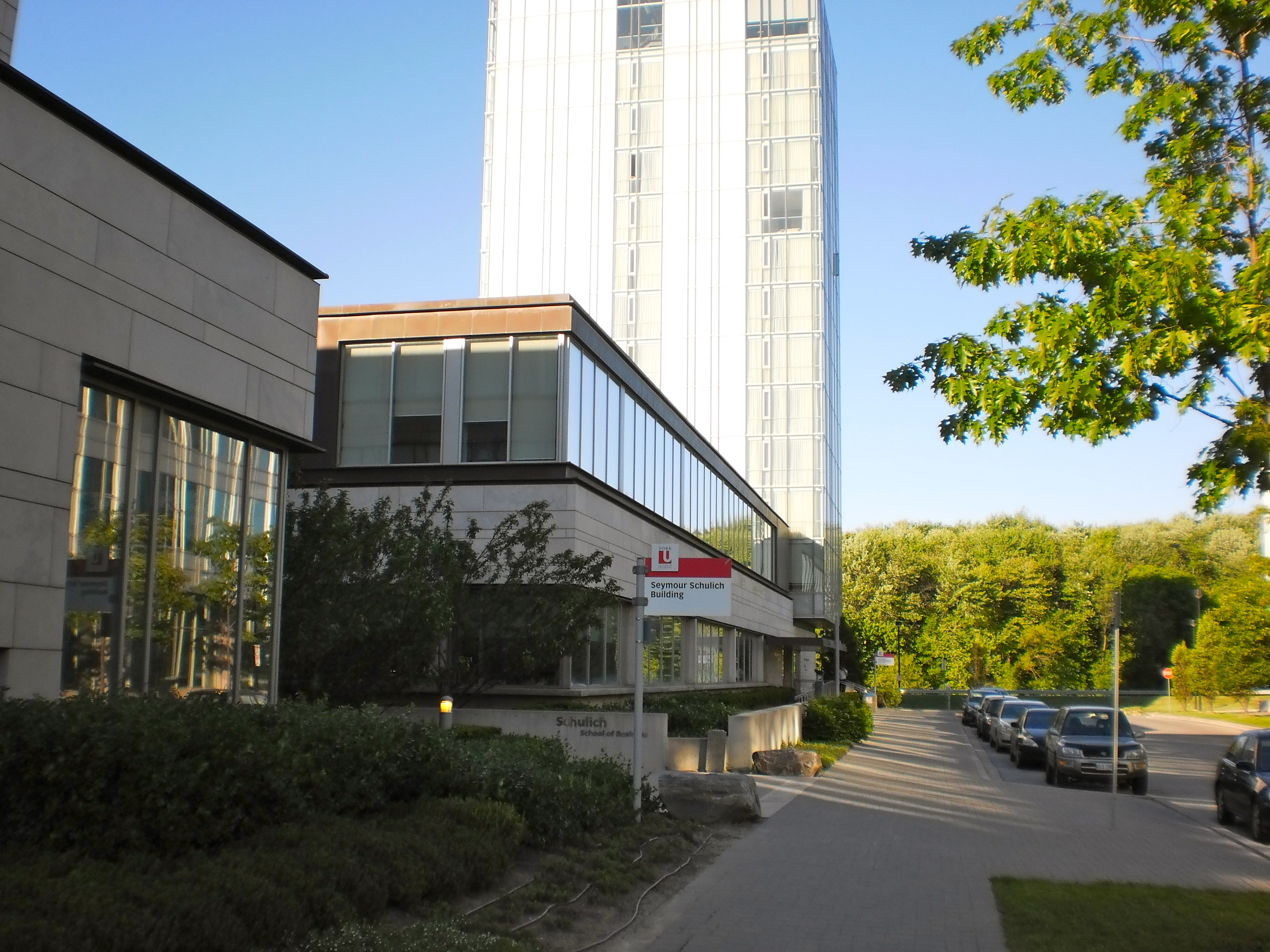
Schulich School of Business - York University
