= Angela Asher =

Canadian film and television actress

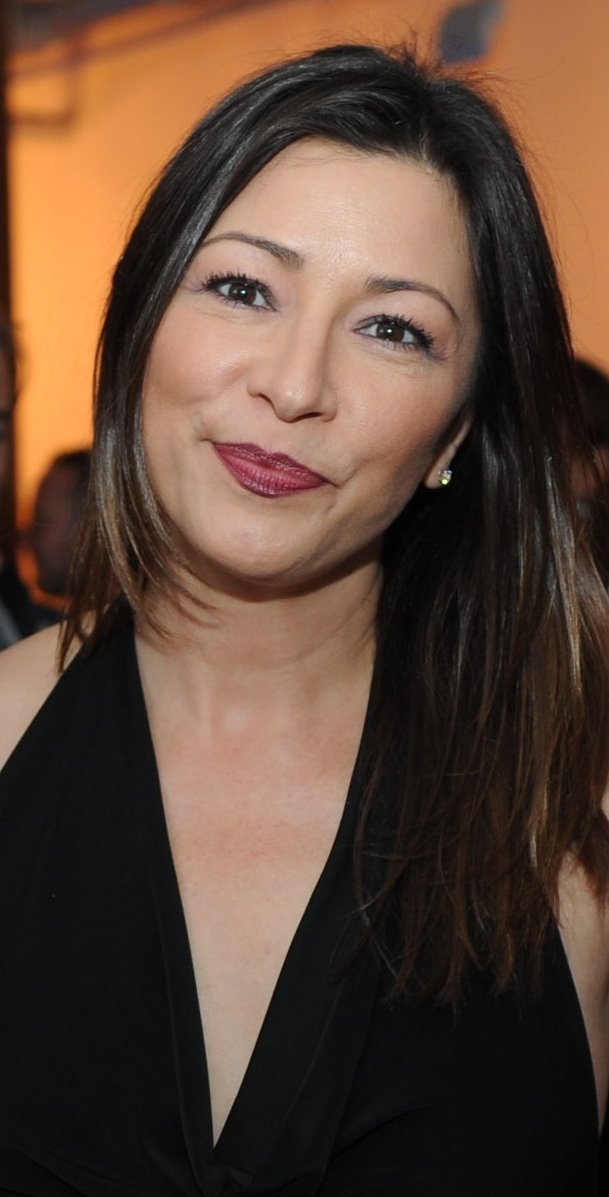
- Occupation: Actor
- Known for: 18 to Life, Hard Rock Medical, Workin' Moms
- Political party: New Blue

Angela Asher is a Canadian film and television actress. She is most noted for her role as Tara Mercer in 18 to Life, for which she received a nomination for Best Actress in a Comedy Series at the 26th Gemini Awards in 2011.

She has also had recurring or regular roles in the television series Married Life, This Is Wonderland, Degrassi, Inhuman Condition, Bad Blood, Hard Rock Medical and Workin' Moms, and appeared in the films Interstate 60, King of Sorrow, A Dark Truth and Ghostland.

In 2022, Asher was a candidate in the 2022 Ontario general election for the New Blue Party of Ontario, which garnered publicity by opposing public health measures against COVID-19. She ran in Spadina—Fort York, placing fifth with under two percent of the vote while incumbent MPP Chris Glover was re-elected.

== Filmography ==
=== Film ===
Year	Title	Role	Notes
1992	Talons of the Eagle	Constable Link	
1994	Boozecan	Bell	
2001	True Blue	Levealle	
2002	Interstate 60	Waitress	
2007	King of Sorrow	Dr. Dreyfus	
2009	A Touch of Grey	Liz	
2012	A Dark Truth	Caller	Voice
2013	A Fish Story	Louise	
2016	Only I...	Marcy Galloway	
2018	Ghostland	Candy Truck Woman	
2019	Claws of the Red Dragon	Clair Rosenberg	

=== Television ===
Year	Title	Role	Notes
1994	Catwalk	Janie	Episode: "Getting What You Want"
1994	Forever Knight	Prostitute	Episode: "Killer Instinct"
1994	Side Effects	Amber	Episode: "Superman"
1995	The Hardy Boys	Karen Smith	Episode: "A Perfect Stranger"
1995	Where's the Money, Noreen?	Noreen Lookalike	Television film
1996	Once a Thief	Olivia Gearing	Television film
1997	Psi Factor	Angel	Episode: "The Curse/Angel on a Plane"
1997	Earth: Final Conflict	Frauke Manheim	Episode: "Horizon Zero"
1998	When Husbands Cheat	Motel Woman	Television film
1998	Once a Thief	Olivia Gearing	Episode: "Shaken Not Stirred"
2001	Queer as Folk	Marianne 'M.M.' MacDonald	Episode: "Very Stupid People"
2001	Sex, Lies & Obsession	Health Clinic Nurse	Television film
2002	Puppets Who Kill	Nurse Ynez	Episode: "Bill's Brain"
2003	Blue Murder	Carly Mitchell	Episode: "Ambush"
2003	Coast to Coast	Tanya Reinhardt	Television film
2004–2006	This Is Wonderland	Trish De Raey / Joelle Bellemy	6 episodes
2006	The Path to 9/11	Lorraine Di Taranto	2 episodes
2008–2009	Degrassi: The Next Generation	Evelyn Valieri	4 episodes
2010	Ties That Bind	Meredith Cole	Television film
2010–2011	18 to Life	Tara Hill	25 episodes
2013	The Listener	Kay Walton	Episode: "Love's a Bitch"
2013–2018	Hard Rock Medical	Nancy Siebolski	39 episodes
2016	Inhuman Condition	Rachel	9 episodes
2016	I'll Be Home for Christmas	Suzi Tate	Television film
2016, 2018	Private Eyes	Maggie Melroy	2 episodes
2017	My Roommate's an Escort	Joanne	2 episodes
2017–2018	Bad Blood	Renata	6 episodes
2018	Ghost BFF	Coco Beauvais	4 episodes
2018	Workin' Moms	Dorothy Cutwater	5 episodes
2018	Christmas at Grand Valley	Vera	Television film
2019	Northern Rescue	Officer Dani	2 episodes
2019	Impulse	Fran	Episode: "For Those Lost"
2019	Hudson & Rex	Haley Farr	Episode: "Dead Man Walking"
2019	Ghostwriter	Mouse	Episode: "The Jungle Ghost, Part 1"

== Electoral record ==
2022 Ontario general election: Spadina—Fort York
Party	Candidate	Votes	%	±%	Expenditures
New Democratic	Chris Glover	15,595	46.06	−3.56	$135,213
Liberal	Chi Nguyen	9,463	27.95	+4.28	$81,726
Progressive Conservative	Husain Neemuchwala	6,221	18.37	−3.41	$14,178
Green	Cara Des Granges	1,902	5.62	+1.97	$1,233
New Blue	Angela Asher	581	1.72		$5,875
Stop the New Sex-Ed Agenda	Jan Osko	95	0.28	+0.11	$0
Total valid votes/expense limit		33,857	99.32	+0.15	$139,048
Total rejected, unmarked, and declined ballots		230	0.68	-0.15	
Turnout		34,087	34.35		
Eligible voters		99,325			
New Democratic hold		Swing		−3.92	
Source(s): "Summary of Valid Votes Cast for Each Candidate" (PDF). Elections Ontario. 2022. Archived from the original on May 18, 2023.; "Statistical Summary by Electoral District" (PDF). Elections Ontario. 2022. Archived from the original on May 21, 2023.
