= Spadina—Fort York (provincial electoral district) =

Provincial electoral district in Ontario, Canada

Coordinates: 43.634°N 79.386°W

Ontario electoral district
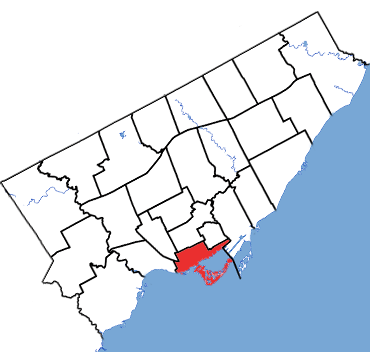
- Spadina-Fort York in relation to the other Toronto ridings

Provincial electoral district
- Legislature: Legislative Assembly of Ontario
MPP
Chris Glover
New Democratic
- District created: 2015
- First contested: 2018
- Last contested: 2025

Demographics
- Population (2016): 115,510
- Electors (2018): 93,622
- Area (km²): 21
- Pop. density (per km²): 5,500.5
- Census division: Toronto
- Census subdivision: Toronto

Spadina—Fort York is a provincial electoral district in Toronto, Ontario, Canada. It elects one member to the Legislative Assembly of Ontario. This riding was created in 2015.

== Members of Provincial Parliament ==
Spadina—Fort York
Assembly	Years	Member	Party
Riding created from Trinity—Spadina and Toronto Centre
42nd	2018–2022	Chris Glover	New Democratic
43rd	2022–2025	Chris Glover	New Democratic
44th	2025–present	Chris Glover	New Democratic

== Election results ==
=== 2025 election ===
Winning party in each polling division of Spadina—Fort York riding at the 2025 Ontario general election

2025 Ontario general election
Party	Candidate	Votes	%	±%	Expenditures
New Democratic	Chris Glover	20,441	45.00	–1.06	$118,413
Liberal	April Engelberg	14,331	31.55	+3.60	$66,757
Progressive Conservative	Omar Farhat	9,139	20.12	+1.75	$6,156
Green	Patrick Macklem	1,220	2.69	–2.93	$6,858
None of the Above	Ron Shaw	293	0.65	N/A	$0
Total valid votes/expense limit		45,424	99.14	–0.19	$175,818
Total rejected, unmarked, and declined ballots		392	0.86	+0.19	
Turnout		45,816	43.31	+8.96	
Eligible voters		105,786			
New Democratic hold		Swing		–2.33	
Source: Elections Ontario

=== 2022 election ===
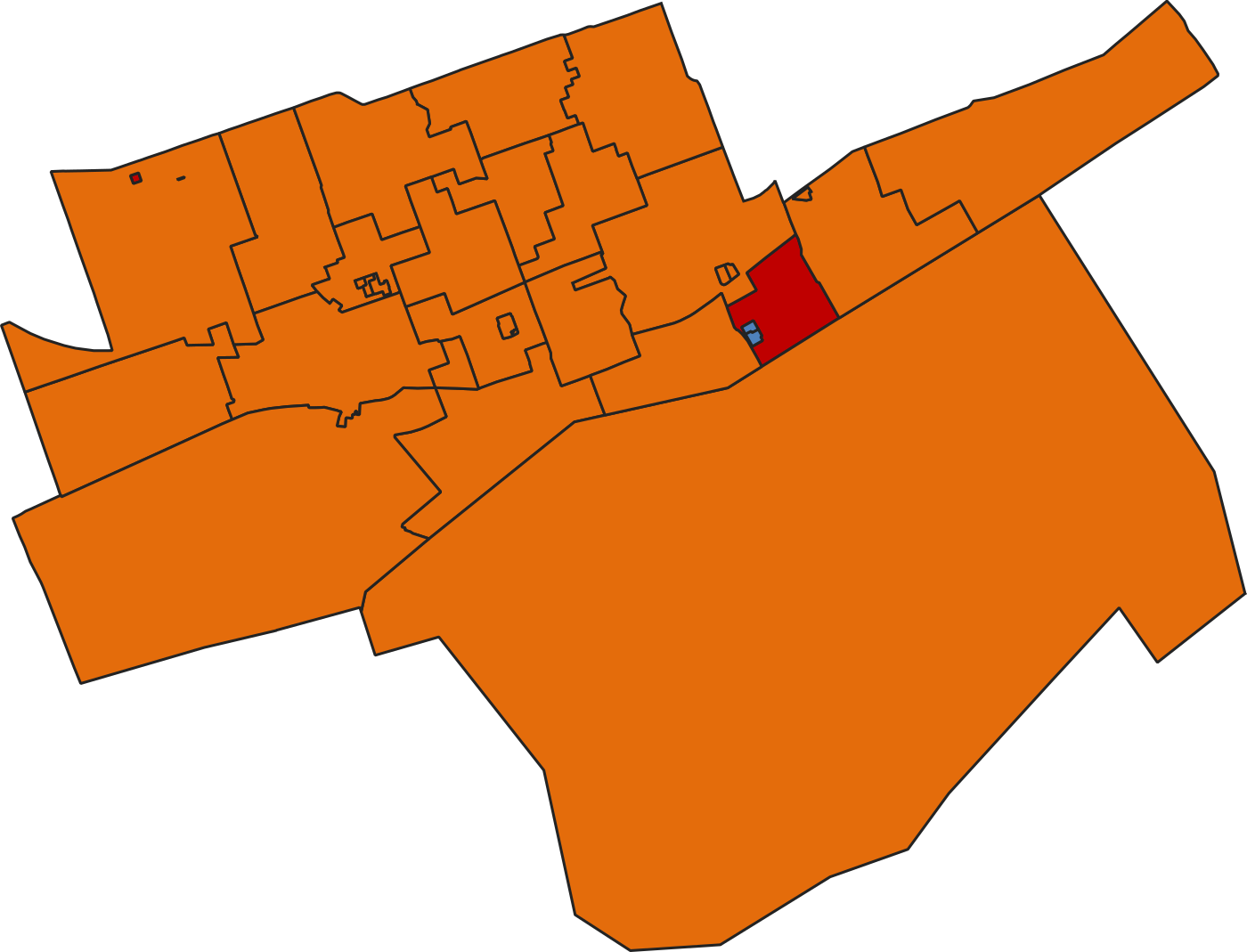
Winner in each polling division in Spadina—Fort York at the 2022 Ontario General Election

2022 Ontario general election
Party	Candidate	Votes	%	±%	Expenditures
New Democratic	Chris Glover	15,595	46.06	−3.56	$135,213
Liberal	Chi Nguyen	9,463	27.95	+4.28	$81,726
Progressive Conservative	Husain Neemuchwala	6,221	18.37	−3.41	$14,178
Green	Cara Des Granges	1,902	5.62	+1.97	$1,233
New Blue	Angela Asher	581	1.72		$5,875
Stop the New Sex-Ed Agenda	Jan Osko	95	0.28	+0.11	$0
Total valid votes/expense limit		33,857	99.32	+0.15	$139,048
Total rejected, unmarked, and declined ballots		230	0.68	-0.15	
Turnout		34,087	34.35		
Eligible voters		99,325			
New Democratic hold		Swing		−3.92	
Source(s): "Summary of Valid Votes Cast for Each Candidate" (PDF). Elections Ontario. 2022. Archived from the original on 18 May 2023.; "Statistical Summary by Electoral District" (PDF). Elections Ontario. 2022. Archived from the original on 21 May 2023.

=== 2018 election ===
2018 Ontario general election
Party	Candidate	Votes	%	±%
New Democratic	Chris Glover	24,677	49.62	+22.91
Liberal	Han Dong	11,770	23.67	-24.63
Progressive Conservative	Iris Yu	10,834	21.79	+4.33
Green	Rita Bilerman	1,815	3.65	-1.73
Libertarian	Erik Malmholt	278	0.56	N/A
None of the Above	Adam Nobody	271	0.54	N/A
Stop the New Sex-Ed Agenda	Queenie Yu	86	0.17	N/A
Total valid votes		49,731	99.17	
Total rejected, unmarked and declined ballots		415	0.83	
Turnout		50,146	53.56	
Eligible voters		93,622		
New Democratic notional gain from Liberal		Swing		+23.77
Source: Elections Ontario

=== 2014 election ===
2014 general election redistributed results
Party	Vote	%
Liberal	16,660	48.30
New Democratic	9,216	26.71
Progressive Conservative	6,024	17.46
Green	1,857	5.38
Others	739	2.14

== See also ==
- List of Ontario provincial electoral districts
- Canadian provincial electoral districts
