= My Roommate's an Escort =

Canadian comedy web series

- Genre: Comedy
- Created by: Katie Uhlmann; Trish Rainone
- Directed by: Katie Uhlmann
- Presented by: David Carruthers; Adrenaline Toronto
- Starring: Katie Uhlmann; Trish Rainone; Bobby Del Rio; PJ Lazic; Juan Carlos Velis; A.C. Peterson; Natasha Bromfield; Angela Asher; Stephanie Baird; Jane Luk; John Tench; David Sparrow; Ellen Dubin
- Composer: Julian Francis Adderley
- Country of origin: Canada
- Original language: English
- No. of seasons: 1
- No. of episodes: 11

Production
- Executive producers: David Carruthers; Joey Nixon; Terry Rainone; Bernie Uhlmann; Joanne Uhlmann; Kalista Zackhariyas; Shunell Hillman; Matthew Willson
- Producers: Trish Rainone; Katie Uhlmann; Julian Adderley; Stephanie Baird
- Production locations: Toronto, Ontario
- Cinematography: Russ Goozee
- Editor: Julian Francis Adderley
- Running time: 4–7 minutes
- Production company: MRAE Productions

Original release
- Network: YouTube
- Release: April 20 – April 20, 2017

My Roommate's an Escort is a Canadian comedy web series created, written by, and starring Katie Uhlmann and Trish Rainone. All 11 episodes of the first season are directed by Uhlmann, and the series premiered on YouTube on April 3, 2017. Rainone plays a non-confrontational, small-town girl living in Toronto who suspects her new roommate Kesha, played by Uhlmann, is a call girl.

== Background ==
My Roommate's an Escort was written by Katie Uhlmann and Trish Rainone. Uhlmann and Rainone met at a mutual friend's party and bonded over similar ideas about creating "strong female-driven content." The series went from concept to completion in twelve months.

A preview for the series debuted at the 2017 Toronto Short Film Festival.

== Plot ==
Each episode opens with the same intro, establishing the house where most of the series is set. The same music plays for the intro and outro. Heather, a girl from Sault Ste. Marie, Ontario, now living in Toronto, finds a new roommate online, Kesha, who may or may not be a private escort. Heather passive-aggressively tries to find out more about Kesha, unintentionally getting dragged into her world and the sketchy characters who inhabit it. In each episode, Heather retreats to vent at her one place of solace, a tattoo shop.

== Cast ==
- Katie Uhlmann as Kesha
- Trish Rainone as Heather
- Bobby Del Rio as Sam
- PJ Lazic as Terry
- Stephanie Baird as Megan
- Alan Peterson as Golden Jimmy
- Jane Luk as Jen
- Natasha Bromfield as Susie
- Juan Carlos Velis as Bernie
- Matthew Willson as Jazz
- Angela Asher as Joanne
- Barbara de la Fuente as Ronda
- Ellen Dubin as Ginger
- David Sparrow as Daddy
- John Tench as John Jebovah
- Jake Raymond as John
- David Emanuel as Ricky
- Aisha Evelyna as Kristy
- Karlo William as Guillaume

== Reception ==
The Globe and Mail reviewed it positively, describing it as "wry and a bit bonkers" but "endearing and quite funny" and "highly polished for a low-budget production."

== Awards and nominations ==
Awards:

- 2018 Best International Series – Miami Web Festival – Miami, USA
- 2017 Best Web/New Media Award – Kapow Intergalactic Film Festival, Los Angeles, USA
- 2017 Best Actress – Katie Uhlmann – Yes! Let's Make a Movie Festival, Montreal, Canada
- 2017 Audience Choice Award – Austin Revolution Film Festival, Austin, USA
- 2017 Director's Choice Award – Best Web Series – Austin Revolution Film Festival, Austin, USA

Nominations:

- 2018 Best Comedy – Vancouver Webfest – Vancouver, Canada
- 2018 Best Web Series – Miami Web Festival – Miami, USA
- 2017 Best Actress – Katie Uhlmann – TO Webfest – Toronto, Canada
- 2017 Best Actress – Trish Rainone – TO Webfest – Toronto, Canada
- 2017 Best Trailer – Bilbao Web Fest – Bilbao, Spain
