= Kevin Vuong =

Canadian politician (born 1989)

Member of Parliament for Spadina—Fort York
- In office 20 September 2021 – 27 April 2025
- Preceded by: Adam Vaughan
- Succeeded by: Chi Nguyen

Personal details
- Born: 1989 (age 36–37)
- Party: Independent (2021–present) (Note: Vuong joined the Conservative Party in 2023 but is not a member of the Conservative caucus.)
- Other political affiliations: Liberal (2021)
- Education: University of Western Ontario (BMOS)
- Profession: Businessman; politician; military reserve officer
- Website: www.kevinvuong.com

Military service
- Branch/service: Royal Canadian Navy (reserve)
- Years of service: 2015–present
- Rank: Sub-lieutenant
- Unit: HMCS York

Kevin Vuong (born 1989) is a Canadian former politician who was the member of Parliament (MP) for Spadina—Fort York from 2021 to 2025.

Initially nominated as a Liberal candidate at the start of the 2021 Canadian federal election campaign, Vuong's candidacy gained nation-wide negative press attention in the final four days of the election campaign when a withdrawn sexual assault charge from 2019 emerged. The Liberal Party of Canada formally withdrew its endorsement two days prior to election day for Vuong's repeated misrepresentations concealing the charge to party operatives. Given the lateness of the decision, Vuong remained listed as the Liberal candidate on the ballot.

He was elected and sat as an independent MP for the duration of the 44th Canadian Parliament and faced periodic calls for his resignation. He joined the Conservative Party in November 2023, and publicly indicated his wish to sit with the Conservative caucus and run under that party's banner in the 2025 federal election. However, the party declined to allow him to sit in caucus and he did not seek re-election in 2025.

== Background ==
Vuong's ethnic Chinese parents immigrated to Canada as Vietnam War refugees. He grew up in Brampton, Ontario. In high school, Vuong was mentored by Ivey Business School students, who inspired him to study finance at the University of Western Ontario.

== Early profile building ==
Prior to seeking public office, Vuong participated in various organizations that provided him with opportunities to seek press coverage.

Vuong participated in events associated with the 2013 G20 Saint Petersburg summit as a member of Canada's youth delegation. He led the youth summit's working groups for international financial regulation and infrastructure development and presented to Russian president Vladimir Putin and selected G20 leaders on the topic of global tax havens. This followed Putin's 2012 return to the presidency through widespread falsification of elections and censorship. In 2014, the Organized Crime and Corruption Reporting Project named Putin their Person of the Year, award to the worst offender among political leaders for enabling and furthering corruption. In November 2020, Vuong was named a NATO 2030 Young Leader, a group assembled for providing input to the NATO 2030 initiative launch by Secretary General Jens Soltenburg in response to the increasing threats to security caused by Russia.

Vuong was a member of the Toronto Youth Cabinet, a volunteer organization for engaging youth in local government. He held himself out as a co-chair of the Toronto Youth Equity Strategy, a City of Toronto initiative that operated by city staff between 2014 and 2017, in various public discourse, though none of Toronto Youth Equity Strategy documents released by the city listed him as such. The Strategy's 2017 report acknowledged various contributors by name, but Vuong was not among those acknowledged in the report.

His service in the Canadian Forces Naval Reserve, much touted during his two electoral bids, would compound the controversy he later faced. He joined the reserve in 2015, and by the time of his 2021 federal bid was serving in the public affairs branch at HMCS York in the OF-1 rank of sub-lieutenant, the most junior officer rank. Per Queen's Regulations and Orders, Chapter 19 Conduct & Discipline, Canadian Armed Forces members who have been arrested by civil authority are required to report the arrest to their commanding officer. The Royal Canadian Navy charged Vuong in February 2022, for conduct to the prejudice of good order and discipline under the National Defence Act for the non-disclosure of 2019 sexual assault charge to his chain of command. Vuong chose to face a summary trial instead of a general court-martial. He admitted the particulars underlying the charge, was found guilty and given a fine of $500 in July 2022.

== Political career ==
=== 2018 Toronto City Council bid ===
2018 Toronto municipal election, Ward 10 Spadina—Fort York
Candidate	Votes	Vote share
Joe Cressy	15,903	Yes 55.06%
April Engelberg	3,346	11.58%
Kevin Vuong	3,018	10.45%
Sabrina Zuniga	1,564	5.41%
John Nguyen	1,032	3.57%
Karlene Nation	860	2.98%
Rick Myers	747	2.59%
Dean Maher	611	2.12%
Al Carbone	519	1.80%
Andrew Massey	473	1.64%
Michael Barcelos	451	1.56%
Edris Zalmai	147	0.51%
Andrei Zodian	133	0.46%
Ahdam Dour	80	0.28%
Total	28,884	100%
Source: City of Toronto

Vuong ran for Toronto City Council during the 2018 municipal election. He started campaigning for Ward 20, the southern half of Spadina—Fort York, early and was emerging as the leading Liberal candidate, with TDSB trustee Ausma Malik as the primary rival back by the local NDP establishment. The dynamic of the contest changed following the provincial election that year, with defeated local Liberal MPP Han Dong entered the city race in late July. Dong was previously supportive of Vuong's bid, but was urged by local Liberals who believe his higher profile combined with his ready campaign team a surer bet against the NDP-back candidate. With the local NDP team united behind Malik, it was unlikely for another candidate to win unless the local Liberals also coalesce around a single candidate. Dong urged Vuong to yield given his higher profile and seniority. Upset at Dong's entrance and the subsequent defections of his team members to Dong, Vuong rebuffed Dong in a public and disparaging manner. Vuong would later said there was "no love loss" between him and Dong.

The strained relationship was ultimately for naught. Newly elected Ontario Premier Doug Ford in a surprised move legislated to reduce the number of seats from 47 to 25 in late July, causing contest realignments across the city. Following that decision, Dong and Malik both exited the contest, leaving Vuong to competed for the newly constituted Ward 10 Spadina—Fort York against incumbent councillor Joe Cressy, one of the highest profile NDP-affiliated councillors in the city. In a repeat of his fallout with Dong, Vuong claimed in the right-wing press the Toronto Sun that a belligerent Cressy pressured him to withdraw with veiled threats to his political career. Vuong subsequently received an endorsement from Toronto Sun.

Vuong placed 3rd in that election with 10.5% of the vote, against Cressy's 55%.

=== 2021 Canadian federal election ===
Shortly before the 2021 Canadian federal election campaign was to commence, the Toronto Star reported that Vuong was expected to be tapped by the Liberal Party of Canada as the candidate for Spadina—Fort York following incumbent MP Adam Vaughan's surprise announcement of his retirement. Despite having no previous involvement with the party, the Liberals announced that he was acclaimed the candidate on 13 August.

==== Non-disclosure of legal troubles ====
On 1 September 2021, The Globe and Mail and other media outlets reported that Vuong was involved in a $1.5 million lawsuit filed against him related to a mask making business, TakeCare Supply. The claimant in the case alleged that after the business experience explosive growth Vuong and another business partner refused to acknowledge her as a partner of the venture and only paid her as a vendor. On 10 September 2024, the Toronto Star and CBC News reported that this lawsuit was settled moments before it was to go to trial, on confidential terms. Liberal Party officials defended Vuong during the ordeal.

On 16 September 2021 the Toronto Star reported that that Vuong had been charged with sexual assault in 2019 and that the charges were withdrawn by the crown seven month later. Vuong "unequivocally state(s) that these allegations are false". As part of the Liberal party's candidate vetting process, prospective candidates are required to disclose all legal proceedings they were part of. It was later revealed that Vuong disclosed neither the business lawsuit nor the withdrawn charges in his candidate application or during his vetting interviews, and that he has submitted a criminal record check obtained from a police agency other than the Toronto Police Service. In managing the press coverage of the business lawsuit just weeks earlier, party officials specifically asked him again for any other legal concerns he may have omitted previously, and he "point blank lied" according to his campaign chair.

==== Reactions ====
The following day in Windsor Prime Minister Justin Trudeau, leader of the Liberal Party, responded to the report indicating that the party was not aware of the sexual assault charges and that "(w)e are looking into it very carefully and we have asked the candidate to pause his campaign". The vagueness of the response was seized upon by opposition leaders. Jagmeet Singh, leader of the New Democratic Party (NDP), which was the primary challenger in the Spadina—Fort York electoral district, said that Vuong had either "lied" to the Liberals, or the party knew about them anyway and was putting his ambitions "over the lives and well-being of women". Conservative Party leader Erin O'Toole said, "Justin Trudeau must do the right thing and immediately fire this candidate and confirm that, if elected, this candidate will not sit in the Liberal caucus".

On 17 September, the Department of National Defence announced that the military would also review Vuong's file, as Vuong had failed to share the criminal charge with his chain of command.

On 18 September, the Liberal Party announced its withdrawal of endorsement for Vuong, and that he would not be a member of the Liberal caucus if elected.

==== Election victory and subsequent calls for resignation ====
Vuong's controversy gave rise to the unprecedent situation of a frontrunning candidate being on the ballot as a candidate for a party that had withdrawn its endorsement. Political parties had in some rare occasions withdrew their endorsement after the close of nomination, but almost always in electoral districts where they have no real prospect of winning. The confusion were evident in the many long lineup at polling stations, compounded the already chaotic situation in the downtown district, where the returning officer reduced the number of polling stations to 15.

	Vuong LPC		Di Pasquale NDP		Margin	
Advance Voting	9,957	20.4%	5,539	11.3%	4,418	8.9%
Election Day	9,034	18.5%	11,295	23.1%	-2,261	-4.6%
Total	18,991	38.9%	16,833	34,4%	2,157	4.3%

Vuong emerged victorious despite the controversy, as his campaign had secured a substantial margin of over 4,400 votes from mail-in ballots and advance polls. Of the ballots cast on election day, Vuong was out-polled by the NDP candidate Norm Di Pasquale by over 2,200 votes. He was the only MP elected in Toronto who was out-polled of the ballots cast on election day. Some Spadina-Fort York constituents who cast their ballots before hearing about Vuong's charges said they would have voted differently with some signing a petition requesting a by-election, while others defended Vuong's right to stay in office as the charges were dropped.

On 22 September, two days following the federal election, Vuong announced his intention to take his seat in parliament as an independent to "work hard to earn [voters'] trust" and he intended to address his sexual assault allegations "at a later date more wholly in a dedicated forum", subsequently participating in an interview with John Moore on CFRB. Vuong added that "allegations of sexual assault are a serious matter, deserving of more discussion than this statement can provide." Vuong later deleted the tweet containing the statement.

His statement triggered an avalanche negative responses, with calls for his resignation from constituents, his own campaign team, and senior Liberal figures who campaigned for him recently. Ontario Liberal Party leader Steven Del Duca, who canvassed with Vuong two days before the allegations surfaced, called for Vuong to "examine his conscience" to see if he could credibly take his seat even as an independent given the circumstances of the allegation. Adam Vaughan, Vuong's predecessor whose recommendation secured Vuong's uncontested Liberal nomination, also called for Vuong to resign as he could not honourably take up a "compromised seat" that he had won via "a compromised victory". While it is customary for an outgoing officeholder to confer with their successor after an election, Vaughan refused to meet with Vuong to discuss "certain sensitive cases and would instead ask ministers or neighbouring MPs to take them forward".

2021 Canadian federal election: Spadina—Fort York
Party	Candidate	Votes	%	±%	Expenditures
Liberal	Kevin Vuong (Note: On September 18, the Liberal Party of Canada announced that Vuong had been removed as that party's candidate. As this decision came after the deadline for candidate registration, he remained on the ballot as a Liberal.)	18,991	38.9	-16.90	$91,687.69
New Democratic	Norm Di Pasquale	16,833	34.5	+14.38	$38,343.91
Conservative	Sukhi Jandu	9,875	20.2	+2.63	$4,940.07
Green	Amanda Rosenstock	1,645	3.4	-1.83	$4,776.90
People's	Ian Roden	1,476	3.0	+1.92	$9,098.37
Total valid votes/expense limit		48,820	–	–	$118,118.29
Total rejected ballots					
Turnout		48,820	54.25		
Eligible voters		89,998			
Liberal hold		Swing		-15.64	
Source: Elections Canada

=== Evading constituents, shifting allegiance ===
Throughout his tenure, constituents who complained to Vuong about his past through email or phone messages said they never heard back from the MP. Constituents and commentators critical of Vuong reported having been blocked by Vuong's MP social media accounts. Vuong also restricted who can comment on his Instagram posts.

Despite repeated gestures praising the Liberal government actions in his first year in parliament, Vuong remained a pariah among Liberals in Ottawa. After becoming a member of the Conservative Party of Canada in October 2023, his votes and public discourse increasingly aligned with Conservative positions on matters such as economic and drug policy. In February 2024, Vuong publicly expressed his desire to join the Conservative caucus and to run as a Conservative candidate in the next federal election. In May 2024, he made a request to Conservative leader Pierre Poilievre to join the Conservative caucus. The request was not granted. Soon after the 2025 election was called, Vuong announced that he would not run for re-election.

=== Support of Israel ===
Since the beginning of the Gaza war, Vuong became an evangelized defender of the Israel government and the Canadian Jewish community and businesses. He had previously express no view or interest, in parliament or on social media, in Middle East issues. In February 2024, he reported incidents of alleged antisemitism in Canada when pro-Palestinian protestors targeted a branch of an Israeli chain restaurant in Toronto. In June 2024, Vuong claimed that he and his wife were being followed by pro-Palestine activists and being harassed with a poster drive in his neighbourhood.

In numerous instances Vuong linked his allegations of intimidation by pro-Palestine activists with foreign interference by Communist China, stating his belief that there is coordination between the Islamic regime in Iran and the Chinese Communist Party, claiming that United Front groups in Greater Toronto "have taken part in the perpetuation of Hamas propaganda".

== Claiming victimhood of foreign interference, sexual entrapment ==
After his election in 2021, Vuong took gradual steps to downplay his non-disclosure of the existence of a sexual assault charge by deflecting blame to the complainant initially and starting in 2023 by claiming to be a victim of a sexual entrapment conspiracy that was part of foreign interference effort by China's communist regime.

In March 2022, Vuong stated that he remained of the belief that there was "no onus on me to speak of a fantasy allegation". He further claimed he was the target of a "dedicated and deliberate smear campaign" launched just before the election.

Starting in November 2022, Vuong made foreign interference by the China state a main focus of his parliamentary interventions. This timing coincided with Global News' reporting of suspected attempts by the PRC to infiltrate the Parliament of Canada by funding a network of candidates. The reporting directly implicated Vuong's fellow MP Han Dong, with whom Vuong had an acknowledged strained relationship stemming from the 2018 municipal campaign, and were later discredited by findings made a public inquiry and superior court proceedings.

In March 2023, Global journalist Sam Cooper published two explosive reports citing CSIS sources in naming Liberal MP Han Dong as an alleged "witting affiliate" for Chinese interference and alleged that had advised a Chinese diplomat to extend the detention of Michael Spavor and Michael Kovrig, two Canadian held by China as political hostage. The Globe and Mail, which had collaborated with Global in the 2022 report, later revealed it had previously received the same intelligence regarding Han Dong's alleged conversation with a Chinese diplomat, but did not report it at the time as it was unable to authenticate the content. During a subsequent libel lawsuit issued by Dong against Global and its journalists, Cooper under examination admitted that the reported allegations were merely relaying what the CSIS source believed about matters and that he did not verify whether the allegations were true. Cooper left Global by June that year, and his reporting was severely criticized by reporters and national security commentators for failing to verify his sources' claims, with Justice Paul Perell of the Ontario Superior Court finding Global News had no documentary evidence supporting Cooper's claims. In the subsequent Public Inquiry into Foreign Interference, Justice Marie-Josée Hogue of the Quebec Court of Appeal concluded that classified intelligence corroborated Dong's denial of Cooper's reporting. In 2025. Global entered into a settlement with Dong and accepted the finding of Justice Hogue. In the months around the Global reporting, Vuong took an active part in criticizing the government, devoting an oral question to the Prime Minister, a rarity for an independent member, to draw negative attention to Dong's 2019 nomination without naming him.

Following a briefing by CSIS officials, in May 2023 Vuong publicly linked the sexual assault charges he faced to the ongoing coverage of Chinese interference in a marked shift of his narrative around the events that led to his legal troubles. Portraying himself as a victim of a geopolitical conspiracy, Vuong suggested that his complainant "fits the Chinese MO of a honey trap", and "what [the Chinese government] did to me was dragged my name through the mud". Vuong believes he was a target because the Chinese government wanted his electoral district represented by someone who was “sympathetic their agenda”, citing his parents experience as Vietnam War refugees "being ran out of their country by communists" as apparent reason for the Chinese government to consider him unsympathetic.

The events that led to Vuong being charged for sexual assault occurred a few months after he had received merely 10% of the vote in a municipal election and more than two years before his nomination as a Liberal candidate. Prior to being elected MP in 2021, Vuong was involved in several initiatives with geopolitical focus (in particular as a NATO 2030 Young Leader), but he had no public record of involvement with any organizations drawing attention to issues relating to China, or of articulating any criticism of Communist China in his social media and from the many occasions he sought and received press coverage. In purporting himself as a victim of state-sponsored sexual entrapment for blackmail, Vuong offered no substantive evidence to support his contention or explanation of why he would be a target years before any public expression of interest in seeking federal office. There were no suggestion that the complainant communicated with Vuong to blackmail him before speaking to journalists. In subsequent discourse, Vuong repeated his honey trap contention with more forceful and definitive language than his initial suggestions.

In the final months of his parliamentary term, Vuong stepped up his involvement in the subject of foreign interference. In October 2024, Vuong hosted a press conference in the national press gallery with Sam Cooper, the journalist who made the unverified allegation against Han Dong, featured as one of the three speakers. Cooper by this point have already been subject to judicial rebuke and heavy peer criticism for reporting the explosive unverified allegations against Dong. During the press conference, Cooper made further allegations against a number of other political figures, including trade minister Mary Ng, the most senior Chinese public office holder in Canada, an MP from British Columbia, two senators, journalists and political advisors as collaborator with communist China's influence network. His allegations were reported by a few right wing outlets but received scant attention from main stream press, with only the National Post the only national outlet giving it coverage.

After leaving parliament he became a Senior Fellow at the Macdonald–Laurier Institute, a conservative public policy think tank.
