= Spadina—Harbourfront =

Federal electoral district in Ontario, Canada

Ontario electoral district
- Interactive map of riding boundaries from the 2025 federal election
- Coordinates: 43.634°N 79.386°W

Federal electoral district
- Legislature: House of Commons
MP
Chi Nguyen
Liberal
- District created: 2013
- First contested: 2015
- Last contested: 2025
- District webpage: profile, map

Demographics
- Population (2021): 136,213
- Electors (2015): 73,179
- Area (km²): 21
- Pop. density (per km²): 6,486.3
- Census division: Toronto
- Census subdivision: Toronto (part)

Spadina—Harbourfront (formerly Spadina—Fort York) is a federal electoral district in Toronto, Ontario, Canada.

Spadina—Fort York was created by the 2012 federal electoral boundaries redistribution and was legally defined in the 2013 representation order. It came into effect upon the call of the 42nd Canadian federal election in October 2015.

It covers most of the western portion of Downtown Toronto, and is essentially the successor of Trinity—Spadina, covering the area of that riding south of Dundas Street. It also absorbed part of the western portion of Toronto Centre.

Under the 2022 Canadian federal electoral redistribution the riding was renamed Spadina—Harbourfront.

== Demographics ==
According to the 2021 Canadian census

Ethnic groups: 46.7% White, 14.5% Chinese, 12.8% South Asian, 6.1% Black, 3.4% Latin American, 2.6% Filipino, 2.3% Arab, 2.0% Southeast Asian, 1.9% West Asian, 1.8% Korean, 1.3% Indigenous
Languages: 55.0% English, 6.3% Mandarin, 4.0% Cantonese, 2.9% Spanish, 2.3% French, 2.1% Portuguese, 1.8% Hindi, 1.6% Russian, 1.6% Arabic, 1.3% Korean, 1.3% Persian, 1.0% Tagalog
Religions: 32.7% Christian (25.1% Catholic, 2.5% Christian Orthodox, 1.9% Anglican, 7.1% Other), 6.6% Muslim, 6.0% Hindu, 2.3% Jewish, 2.1% Buddhist, 1.0% Sikh, 48.3% None
Median income: $58,400 (2020)
Average income: $78,400 (2020)

== Members of Parliament ==
This riding has elected the following members of Parliament:

| Parliament | Years | Member | Party |
|---|---|---|---|
Spadina—Fort York; Riding created from Trinity—Spadina and Toronto Centre
| 42nd | 2015–2019 | Adam Vaughan | Liberal |
| 43rd | 2019–2021 | Adam Vaughan | Liberal |
| 44th | 2021–2025 | Kevin Vuong | Independent |
Spadina—Harbourfront
| 45th | 2025–present | Chi Nguyen | Liberal |

== Election results ==
Graph of election results in Spadina—Fort York (minor parties that never got 2% of the vote or didn't run consistently are omitted)

=== Spadina—Harbourfront, 2023 representation order ===
2025 Canadian federal election
** Preliminary results — Not yet official **
| Party | Candidate | Votes | % | ±% | Expenditures |
|---|---|---|---|---|---|
| Liberal | Chi Nguyen | 30,769 | 59.72 | +21.49 | |
| Conservative | Diana Filipova | 16,002 | 31.06 | +9.36 | |
| New Democratic | Norm Di Pasquale | 3,995 | 7.75 | –26.09 | |
| Green | Gordon Rand | 442 | 0.82 | –2.36 | |
| People's | Gilbert Joseph Jubinville | 188 | 0.36 | –2.65 | |
| Marxist–Leninist | Nick Lin | 83 | 0.16 | N/A | |
| Independent | Shrey Rao | 39 | 0.08 | N/A | |
| Total valid votes/expense limit | | | | | |
| Total rejected ballots | | | | | |
| Turnout | | 51,518 | 64.17 | | |
| Eligible voters | | 80,284 | | | |
| Liberal notional hold | | Swing | | +6.07 | |
Source: Elections Canada

2021 federal election redistributed results
| Party | Vote | % |
|---|---|---|
| Liberal | 13,753 | 38.23 |
| New Democratic | 12,172 | 33.84 |
| Conservative | 7,806 | 21.70 |
| Green | 1,157 | 3.22 |
| People's | 1,085 | 3.01 |

=== Spadina—Fort York, 2013 representation order ===
2021 Canadian federal election: Spadina—Fort York
| Party | Candidate | Votes | % | ±% | Expenditures |
|---|---|---|---|---|---|
| Liberal | Kevin Vuong (Note: On September 18, the Liberal Party of Canada announced that Vuong had been removed as that party's candidate. As this decision came after the deadline for candidate registration, he remained on the ballot as a Liberal.) | 18,991 | 38.9 | -16.90 | $91,687.69 |
| New Democratic | Norm Di Pasquale | 16,833 | 34.5 | +14.38 | $38,343.91 |
| Conservative | Sukhi Jandu | 9,875 | 20.2 | +2.63 | $4,940.07 |
| Green | Amanda Rosenstock | 1,645 | 3.4 | -1.83 | $4,776.90 |
| People's | Ian Roden | 1,476 | 3.0 | +1.92 | $9,098.37 |
| Total valid votes/expense limit | | 48,820 | – | – | $118,118.29 |
| Total rejected ballots | | | | | |
| Turnout | | 48,820 | 54.25 | | |
| Eligible voters | | 89,998 | | | |
Source: Elections Canada

2019 Canadian federal election: Spadina—Fort York
| Party | Candidate | Votes | % | ±% | Expenditures |
|---|---|---|---|---|---|
| Liberal | Adam Vaughan | 33,822 | 55.8 | +1.14 | $100,040.70 |
| New Democratic | Diana Yoon | 12,188 | 20.1 | -7.18 | $35,526.97 |
| Conservative | Frank Fang | 10,680 | 17.6 | +1.87 | none listed |
| Green | Dean Maher | 3,174 | 5.2 | +3.14 | none listed |
| People's | Robert Stewart | 672 | 1.1 | - | none listed |
| Independent | Marcela Ramirez | 114 | 0.2 | - | none listed |
| Total valid votes/expense limit | | 60,650 | 100.0 | | |
| Total rejected ballots | | 339 | | | |
| Turnout | | 60,989 | 67.7 | | |
| Eligible voters | | 90,022 | | | |
| Liberal hold | | Swing | | +4.16 | |
Source: Elections Canada

2015 Canadian federal election
| Party | Candidate | Votes | % | ±% | Expenditures |
|---|---|---|---|---|---|
| Liberal | Adam Vaughan | 30,141 | 54.66 | +30.27 | $165,249.21 |
| New Democratic | Olivia Chow | 15,047 | 27.28 | -22.36 | $157,607.66 |
| Conservative | Sabrina Zuniga | 8,673 | 15.73 | -5.13 | $50,463.77 |
| Green | Sharon Danley | 1,137 | 2.06 | -2.11 | $2,935.30 |
| PACT | Michael Nicula | 91 | 0.17 | – | $21.68 |
| Marxist–Leninist | Nick Lin | 59 | 0.11 | – | – |
| Total valid votes/Expense limit | | 55,148 | 100.0 | | $207,037.56 |
| Total rejected ballots | | 268 | 0.48 | – | |
| Turnout | | 55,416 | 73.93 | – | |
| Eligible voters | | 74,958 | | | |
Source: Elections Canada

2011 federal election redistributed results
| Party | Vote | % |
|---|---|---|
| New Democratic | 18,351 | 49.64 |
| Liberal | 9,015 | 24.39 |
| Conservative | 7,713 | 20.86 |
| Green | 1,540 | 4.17 |
| Others | 350 | 0.95 |

== See also ==
- List of Canadian electoral districts
- Historical federal electoral districts of Canada
