= Otto Joachim (composer) =

German-born Canadian violist and composer

- Born: October 13, 1910; Düsseldorf, Germany
- Died: July 30, 2010 (aged 99); Montreal, Quebec, Canada
- Occupations: Violist, teacher, composer of acoustic and electroacoustic works

Otto Joachim CQ (October 13, 1910 – July 30, 2010) was a German-born Canadian violist and composer of electronic music.

== Early life and education ==
Joachim was born in Düsseldorf, Joachim to Jewish parents. His father was an opera singer. He trained as a violinist at Düsseldorf and at the Rheinische Musikschule in Cologne.

== Career ==
In 1934 Joachim left Nazi Germany (as did many Jewish composers of his time). He played in Singapore and Shanghai during the war years, opened a radio shop, and experimented with electronic instruments and accessories. He also performed occasionally in the Shanghai Municipal Symphony Orchestra and organized an orchestra to perform Jewish and other Western music.

Joachim left Shanghai at the time of the Communist takeover of China, and settled permanently in Montreal in 1949. For the next 15 years Joachim worked as a player, teacher, instrument builder and composer. He played in the Montreal Symphony Orchestra, and beginning in 1956 taught violin and viola at both the McGill Conservatory and at the Conservatoire de musique du Québec à Montréal.

In the 1950s Joachim experimented with twelve-tone music, and in 1956 composed String Quartet, an instrumental piece which combined twelve tone music with more traditional classical techniques. In 1958 he founded the Montreal Consort of Ancient Instruments, and directed it for ten years.

Since the 1960s he has concentrated on his compositions which are a mix of aleatoric and electroacoustic works. He composed a multi-channel electroacoustic work for the Canadian Pavilion, Katimavik at Expo 67 in Montreal. It was in the late-1970s that Joachim took up painting and sculpture. In 1994, he received an honorary doctorate from Concordia University, Montreal. The multi-channel electroacoustic studio in the Department of Music at Concordia University is named "The Otto Joachim Project Studio", where one of his paintings hangs.

In 1986 he was named an Honorary Member of the Canadian Electroacoustic Community, and in 1993, he was made a Knight of the National Order of Quebec.

In 2007 Joachim was presented with an Opus Tribute Award by the Conseil québécois de la musique. He died on July 30, 2010, in Montreal.

== Selected works ==
- Concertante for violin, string orchestra and percussion (1960)
- Contrastes for orchestra (1968)
- Dialogue for viola and piano (1964)
- Expansion for flute and piano (1967)
- Music for Violin and Viola (1953)
- Nonet (1960)
- Paean for cello (1985)
- Petite œuvre for flute, viola and cello (2000)
- Quatro intermezzi for flute and guitar (1981)
- Requiem for violin, or viola, or cello solo (1976)
- Requiem in Memoriam Serge Garant for guitar solo (1976, 1986)
- String Quartet (1960)
- Twelve 12-Tone Pieces for Children for piano solo (1961)

== Awards ==
- 1969 - Grand Prix Paul-Gilson
- 1990 - Prix Calixa-Lavallée of the Société Saint-Jean-Baptiste
- 1993 - Chevalier of the Ordre national du Québec
- 2008 - Tribute Prize of the Conseil québécois de la musique
