= Communist Party of Canada (Marxist–Leninist) candidates in the 2006 Canadian federal election =

Communist political organization in Canada

The Communist Party of Canada (Marxist-Leninist) (CPC-ML) fielded 71 candidates in the 2006 federal election. Some of these candidates have their own biography pages. Information about others may be found here.

== Ontario ==
=== Ancaster—Dundas—Flamborough—Aldershot: Jamilé Ghaddar ===
Ghaddar was born in Lebanon and raised in Montreal and Hamilton. She is a linguistics graduate from McMaster University in Hamilton, and was twenty-two years old at the time of the 2006 election (Hamilton Spectator, 9 January 2006). She helped create "Students 4 Steel" in 2004 to build support for the city's steel industry among the McMaster student community (Spectator, 30 March 2004). She is also a leading member of the McMaster Socialist Movement, Solidarity for Palestinian Human Rights and Citizens Against Racism and Military Aggression

Ghaddar's first name is sometimes spelled as "Jamila".

Electoral record
| Election | Division | Party | Votes | % | Place | Winner |
|---|---|---|---|---|---|---|
| 2003 provincial | Hamilton West | Ind. (Independent Renewal) | 303 | | 6/6 | Judy Marsales, Liberal |
| 2004 federal | Hamilton Centre | Marxist-Leninist | 91 | 0.21 | 7/7 | David Christopherson, New Democratic Party |
| 2006 federal | Ancaster—Dundas—Flamborough—Aldershot | Marxist-Leninist | 112 | | 6/6 | David Sweet, Conservative |

=== Beaches—East York: Roger Carter ===
Carter was born on June 9, 1941, in Winnipeg, Manitoba and died on May 29, 2023, in Toronto. He joined the CPC-ML in 1975, and campaigned for the party five times since then. He was a postal worker, and a Canadian Union of Postal Workers shop steward.

Electoral record
| Election | Division | Party | Votes | % | Place | Winner |
|---|---|---|---|---|---|---|
| 1980 federal | York—Scarborough | Marxist-Leninist | 75 | | 6/6 | Paul J. Cosgrove, Liberal |
| 1993 federal | Don Valley East | Marxist-Leninist | 90 | | 8/9 | David Collenette, Liberal |
| 2000 federal | Willowdale | Marxist-Leninist | 145 | | 5/5 | Jim Peterson, Liberal |
| 2004 federal | Beaches—East York | Marxist-Leninist | 46 | | 8/8 | Maria Minna, Liberal |
| 2006 federal | Beaches—East York | Marxist-Leninist | 91 | 0.18 | 6/6 | Maria Minna, Liberal |

=== Bramalea—Gore—Malton: Francesco (Frank) Chilelli ===
Chilelli joined the Marxist-Leninist Party in 1996, when he was a graduate student at the University of Toronto. His thesis, published in 1998, examined liberal and communist concepts of distributive justice. He was thirty-eight years old in 2006, and was listed as a philosophy teacher for the Peel District School Board. He is a founder of the Bramalea-Gore-Malton Citizens Committee, and a past volunteer with the CARE Connection. Chilelli has called for Canadian soldiers to be brought home from Afghanistan.

Electoral record
| Election | Division | Party | Votes | % | Place | Winner |
|---|---|---|---|---|---|---|
| 1997 federal | Davenport | Marxist-Leninist | 250 | | 6/8 | Charles Caccia, Liberal |
| 2000 federal | Eglinton—Lawrence | Marxist-Leninist | 164 | 0.40 | 6/7 | Joe Volpe, Liberal |
| 2003 provincial | Bramalea—Gore—Malton—Springdale | Ind. (Independent Renewal) | 868 | | 5/6 | Kuldip Kular, Liberal |
| 2004 federal | Bramalea—Gore—Malton | Marxist-Leninist | 237 | | 5/5 | Gurbax Malhi, Liberal |
| 2006 federal | Bramalea—Gore—Malton | Marxist-Leninist | 233 | | 5/5 | Gurbax Malhi, Liberal |

=== Etobicoke Centre: France Tremblay ===
France Tremblay (death in 2008) ran for the Marxist-Leninist Party six times, including five federal candidacies and one provincial candidacy in Quebec. In 1993, she described herself as "a party worker involved in the development of mass media." She was also a secretary and homemaker.

In August 2009, the CPC-ML added the name of France Tremblay to its party memorial in Ottawa.

Electoral record
| Election | Division | Party | Votes | % | Place | Winner |
|---|---|---|---|---|---|---|
| 1988 federal | Langelier | N/A (Marxist-Leninist) | 402 | 0.76 | 5/6 | Gilles Loiselle, Progressive Conservative |
| 1989 Quebec provincial | Rosemont | Marxist-Leninist | 79 | 0.28 | 9/10 | Guy Rivard, Liberal |
| 1993 federal | Scarborough Centre | Marxist-Leninist | 38 | 0.09 | 9/10 | John Cannis, Liberal |
| 2000 federal | Scarborough East | Marxist-Leninist | 113 | 0.28 | 6/6 | John McKay, Liberal |
| 2004 federal | Etobicoke Centre | Marxist-Leninist | 112 | 0.21 | 5/5 | Borys Wrzesnewskyj, Liberal |
| 2006 federal | Etobicoke Centre | Marxist-Leninist | 117 | 0.21 | 6/6 | Borys Wrzesnewskyj, Liberal |

=== Nickel Belt: Stephen Rutchinski ===
Rutchinski was raised in Capreol, Ontario, and was 53 years old during the 2004 election. He is a perennial candidate for the CPC-ML, which he joined in 1973 (Sudbury Star, 10 June 2004). Formerly a steelworker, shipping supervisor and truck driver, Rutchinski works at the University of Toronto as of 2005. He is also a shop steward with United Steelworkers of America Local 1998 (, Sudbury Star, 24 June 2004). He was a member of Toronto's Civil Rights and Privacy Committee during the 1990s, and opposed provisions for biometric identification in the provincial government's Social Assistance Reform Act of 1997.

He has stood for federal and provincial office seven times. He appeared on the ballot as a non-affiliated candidate in 1980 and as an independent candidate in 1999, in both cases because the CPC-ML was not a registered party.

Rutchinski wrote a piece entitled "Crisis in the Party-Run Parliament Reveals the Necessity for Change" for the CPC-ML's newspaper late 2005, calling for a "new democratic process" to replace Canada's "crisis-ridden party-run Parliamentary democracy".

Electoral record
| Election | Division | Party | Votes | % | Place | Winner |
|---|---|---|---|---|---|---|
| 1980 federal | Oshawa | Marxist-Leninist | 29 | | 6/6 | Ed Broadbent, New Democratic Party |
| 1988 federal | Toronto Centre—Rosedale | Non-affiliated (M-L) | 141 | | 4/5 | Sheila Copps, Liberal |
| 1993 federal | Rosedale | Marxist-Leninist | 61 | | 9/10 | Bill Graham, Liberal |
| 1997 federal | Toronto Centre—Rosedale | Marxist-Leninist | 166 | 0.36 | 8/9 | Bill Graham, Liberal |
| 1999 provincial | Beaches—East York | Independent (M-L) | 164 | | 7/7 | Frances Lankin, New Democratic Party |
| 2000 federal | Beaches—East York | Marxist-Leninist | 53 | | 10/10 | Maria Minna, Liberal |
| 2004 federal | Nickel Belt | Marxist-Leninist | 51 | | 7/7 | Raymond Bonin, Liberal |
| 2006 federal | Nickel Belt | Marxist-Leninist | 42 | | 7/7 | Raymond Bonin, Liberal |

=== Oshawa: David Gershuny ===
Gershuny is a shipper and heavy vehicle operator, and is a perennial candidate for the Marxist-Leninist Party. During the 1993 election, he announced that his party would bring forward voter recall as part of an electoral reform package (Toronto Star, 22 October 1993).

His brother, Lorne Gershuny, has also been a candidate of the CPC-ML.

Electoral record
| Election | Division | Party | Votes | % | Place | Winner |
|---|---|---|---|---|---|---|
| 1993 federal | St. Paul's | Marxist-Leninist | 75 | 0.15 | 10/12 | Barry Campbell, Liberal |
| 1999 provincial | Beaches—East York | Independent (M-L) | 486 | | 5/8 | Joseph Cordiano, Liberal |
| 2000 federal | Oshawa | Marxist-Leninist | 97 | | 6/6 | Ivan Grose, Liberal |
| 2004 federal | Mississauga—Brampton South | Marxist-Leninist | 185 | | 5/5 | Navdeep Bains, Liberal |
| 2006 federal | Oshawa | Marxist-Leninist | 91 | | 5/5 | Colin Carrie, Conservative |

=== St. Catharines: Elaine Couto ===
Elaine Couto is a perennial candidate. She received 101 votes (0.17%) in 2006, placing sixth against Conservative candidate Rick Dykstra.

=== Sudbury: David Starbuck ===
David A. Starbuck is a math teacher at Cambrian College, and a frequent candidate of the CPC-ML. He has been the Communication Officer of Ontario Public Service Employees Union Local 655, served on the Sudbury District and Labour Council, and been active in groups such as the Sudbury Coalition for Social Justice and the Sudbury Anti-War Mobilization. Starbuck has campaigned for part-time workers at Ontario community colleges to win the right of collective bargaining.

Electoral record
| Election | Division | Party | Votes | % | Place | Winner |
|---|---|---|---|---|---|---|
| 1972 federal | Rosedale | N/A (Marxist-Leninist) | 95 | 0.26 | 5/5 | Donald S. Macdonald, Liberal |
| 1974 federal | Mississauga | Marxist-Leninist | 113 | 0.13 | 5/5 | Tony Abbott, Liberal |
| 1979 federal | Nickel Belt | Marxist-Leninist | 103 | 0.25 | 4/4 | John Rodriguez, New Democratic Party |
| 1980 federal | Nickel Belt | Marxist-Leninist | 89 | 0.21 | 4/4 | Judy Erola, Liberal |
| 2004 federal | Sudbury | Marxist-Leninist | 100 | 0.23 | 5/5 | Diane Marleau, Liberal |
| 2006 federal | Sudbury | Marxist-Leninist | 77 | 0.16 | 6/8 | Diane Marleau, Liberal |

=== Toronto—Danforth: Marcell Rodden ===
Rodden (born 1980) is a political activist in Toronto, Ontario, and student in Equity Studies at the University of Toronto. He is the former general co-ordinator of Young Left, a revolutionary youth group in Toronto founded by former youth members of the Communist Party of Canada who left the party over organizational and political disagreements. Rodden himself was never a member of the Communist Party of Canada, and describes his politics as neo-Maoist. He is active with Anti-Racist Action in Toronto, the Ontario Coalition Against Poverty, and the Canadian Friends of Soviet People, an organization which supports the re-establishment of the former Soviet Union and publishes the magazine Northstar Compass. Rodden was a delegate at the Second World Congress of Friends of Soviet People, which was held in Canada.

In 2005, he helped coordinate a campaign by the Ontario Coalition Against Poverty to allow Ontario Works recipients to receive an extra $250 per month in dietary funding from the provincial government. The province tightened its regulations for use of the fund later in the year by changing the legislation. He was portrayed by actor Dave Healey during the 2006 federal election in an improvisational comedy show called "Mock the Vote".

Electoral record
| Election | Division | Party | Votes | % | Place | Winner |
|---|---|---|---|---|---|---|
| 2004 federal | Toronto—Danforth | Marxist-Leninist | 84 | 0.18 | 6/6 | Jack Layton, New Democratic Party |
| 2006 federal | Toronto—Danforth | Marxist-Leninist | 172 | | 5/5 | Jack Layton, New Democratic Party |

=== Trinity—Spadina: S. Nicholas C. (Nick) Lin ===
Lin is a worker in the healthcare sector, and a frequent candidate for public office. He has been a member of the Communist Youth Union of Canada (Marxist-Leninist), the Toronto Student Project and the Youth Organizing Movement, as well as the Student Christian Movement of Canada. Lin has emphasized youth and education issues in his campaigns. He was 31 years old at the time of the 2003 provincial election.

He has campaigned as an independent candidate in two provincial elections, as the CPC-ML is not registered at the provincial level.

Electoral record
| Election | Division | Party | Votes | % | Place | Winner |
|---|---|---|---|---|---|---|
| 1999 provincial | York West | Ind. (Marxist-Leninist) | 194 | | 6/7 | Mario Sergio, Liberal |
| 2000 federal | Trinity—Spadina | Marxist-Leninist | 102 | | 7/9 | Tony Ianno, Liberal |
| 2003 provincial | Trinity—Spadina | Ind. (Independent Renewal) | 256 | 0.63 | 6/6 | Rosario Marchese, New Democratic Party |
| 2004 federal | Trinity—Spadina | Marxist-Leninist | 102 | | 6/8 | Tony Ianno, Liberal |
| 2006 federal | Trinity—Spadina | Marxist-Leninist | 138 | | | |

== British Columbia ==
=== Chilliwack—Fraser Canyon: Dorothy Jean O'Donnell ===
O'Donnell was a lawyer and a perennial candidate for the CPC-ML who died on February 10, 2021. She also campaigned provincially in British Columbia, as a candidate of the People's Front. She wrote a party editorial for the National Post newspaper in 2004, criticizing Canada's election financing laws and denouncing military actions taken by the United States of America in Iraq and by Israel against the Palestinian people. In the same year, she testified before the British Columbia Citizen's Assembly on Electoral Reform.

O'Donnell graduated from law school in 1990, was called to the bar in 1991, and completed a Master's Degree in 1995 reviewing the history of the foster care system. She was primarily active in family law.

Electoral record
| Election | Division | Party | Votes | % | Place | Winner |
|---|---|---|---|---|---|---|
| 1979 federal | Broadview—Greenwood | Marxist-Leninist | 57 | 0.17 | 7/7 | Bob Rae, New Democratic Party |
| 1980 federal | Broadview—Greenwood | Marxist-Leninist | 53 | 0.17 | 7/9 | Bob Rae, New Democratic Party |
| 1986 provincial | Vancouver-Little Mountain | People's Front | 128 | | 7/8 | Grace McCarthy and Doug Mowat, Social Credit |
| 1988 federal | Vancouver Centre | N/A (Marxist-Leninist) | 58 | | 9/9 | Kim Campbell, Progressive Conservative |
| 1993 federal | Vancouver Quadra | Marxist-Leninist | 80 | | 12/13 | Ted McWhinney, Liberal |
| 1997 federal | Richmond | Marxist-Leninist | 90 | | 8/8 | Raymond Chan, Liberal |
| 2000 federal | Okanagan—Coquihalla | Marxist-Leninist | 99 | | 9/10 | Stockwell Day, Canadian Alliance |
| 2001 provincial | Yale—Lillooet | People's Front | 136 | | 6/6 | David Chutter, Liberal |
| 2004 federal | Chilliwack—Fraser Canyon | Marxist-Leninist | 95 | | 7/7 | Chuck Strahl, Conservative |
| 2005 provincial | Yale—Lillooet | People's Front | 112 | | 5/5 | Harry Lali, New Democratic Party |
| 2006 federal | Chilliwack—Fraser Canyon | Marxist-Leninist | 114 | | 6/6 | Chuck Strahl, Conservative |
