= Hotel Vancouver (1888) =

Hotel in Vancouver

Coordinates: 49.282631°N 123.118865°W

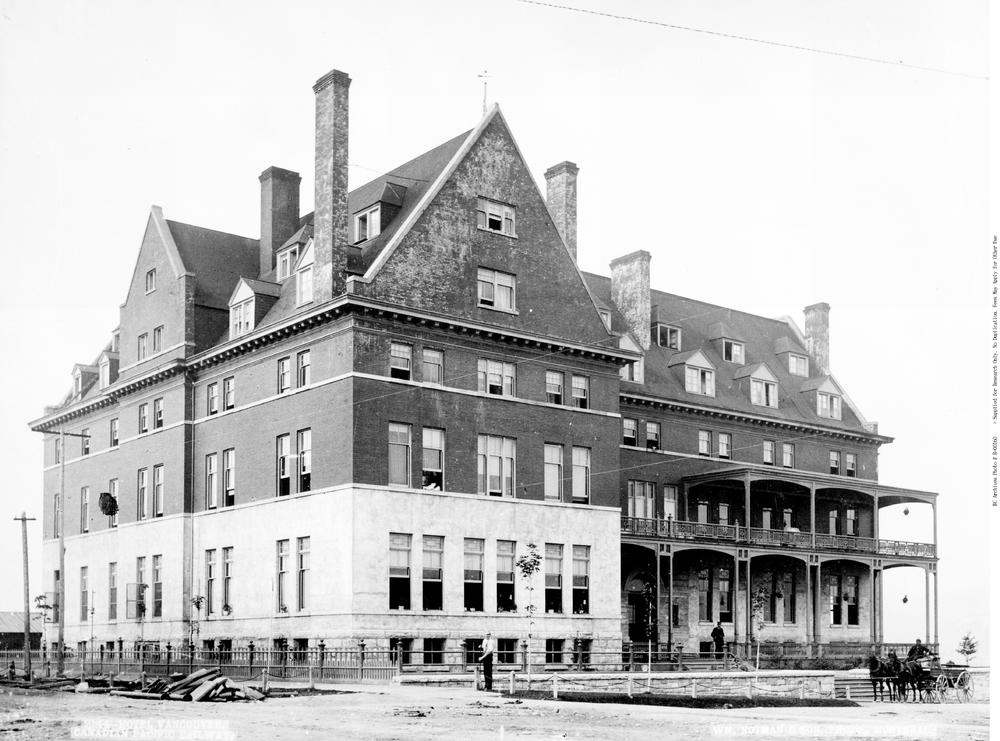

General information
- Location: West Georgia Street, Vancouver, British Columbia
- Opened: 16 May 1888

Design and construction
- Architects: Thomas Charles Sorby (1888); Francis Rattenbury (1893, 1902)

Hotel Vancouver was a hotel in Vancouver, British Columbia that operated between 1888 and 1913. The hotel was built by the Canadian Pacific Railway and was designed by Thomas Charles Sorby. Originally the railway had planned a much larger hotel, but would up scaling back its plans and built a reduced design. An addition was built in 1893, however, by the turn of the century, the hotel was deemed inadequate. In 1900, the railway held a design competition for a new hotel, and the winning entry announced in 1901 was by Francis Rattenbury. Later in 1901, the railway passed over Rattenbury's winning design and asked him to provide a more inexpensive plan. In 1902, Rattenbury's new design was built partially but never completed.

In 1912, Canadian Pacific commissioned a new hotel by Francis S. Swales. The design by Swales incorporated the one section of Rattenbury's design that had been completed, while the original hotel by Sorby was demolished.

== History ==
=== Original hotel by Sorby ===
The hotel was designed by Thomas Charles Sorby, who had designed the railway's first passenger station in the city. Sorby designed a grand hotel in an Italianate style, however, his drawings were destroyed in the Great Vancouver Fire of 13 June 1886. Following the fire, Sorby redesigned the hotel in a shingle style design that was much scaled back from the original. The hotel opened in May 1888 and was the city's first grand hotel. Sorby was displeased with his new design, which was the product of cost constraints on the part of the railway. One journalist referred to it as a "rather plain structure, a sort of glorified farmhouse."

In 1893, Francis Rattenbury designed an addition that was built on the back of the hotel. His addition was unconnected stylistically to Sorby's design.

=== Rattenbury rebuild ===
By the turn of the century, the hotel had become inadequate and the railway sought to rebuild it. Consequently, it held a design competition in late 1900, and Rattenbury was announced as the winner in early 1901. Rattenbury's design was for a châteauesque hotel, as had been popularised by the railway elsewhere. This design went unused, and in its place he designed an Italianate structure that would replace the existing hotel. Construction began on the new hotel, however, only part of it was built and the old hotel was left standing.

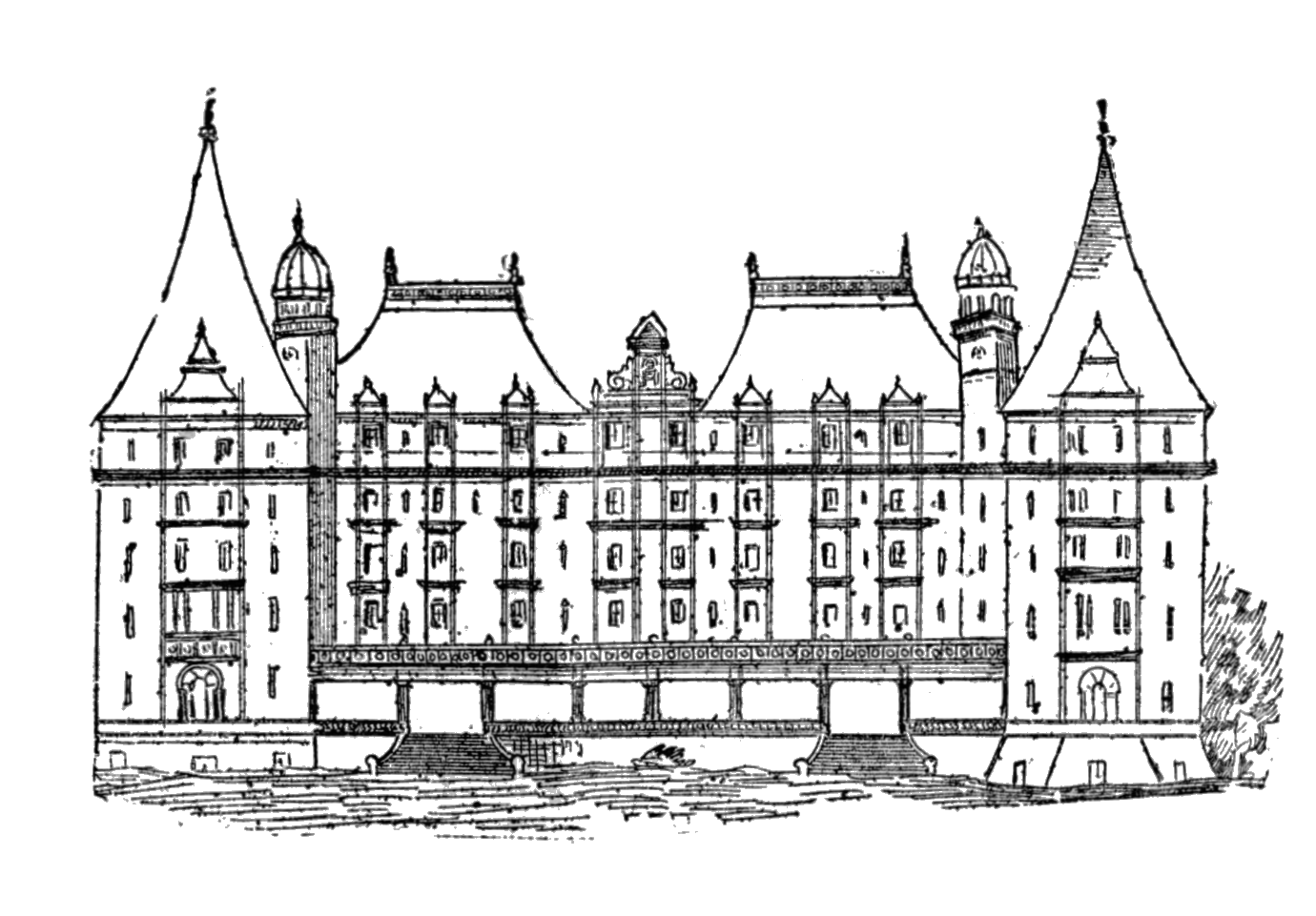
In 1901, Rattenbury won the design competition for a new Hotel Vancouver. His châteauesque plan went unused, but served as the basis for the Empress.

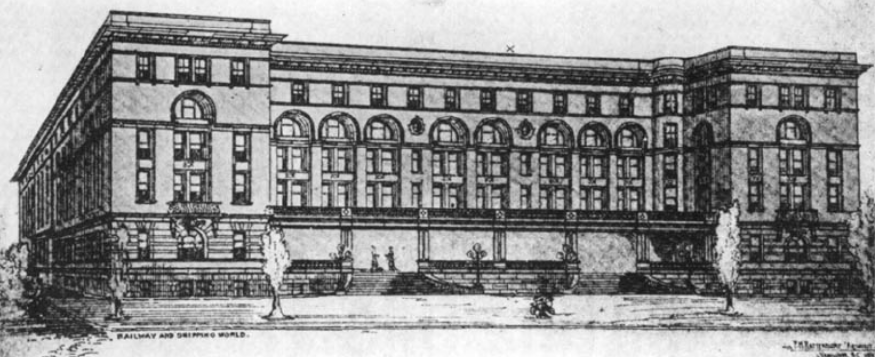
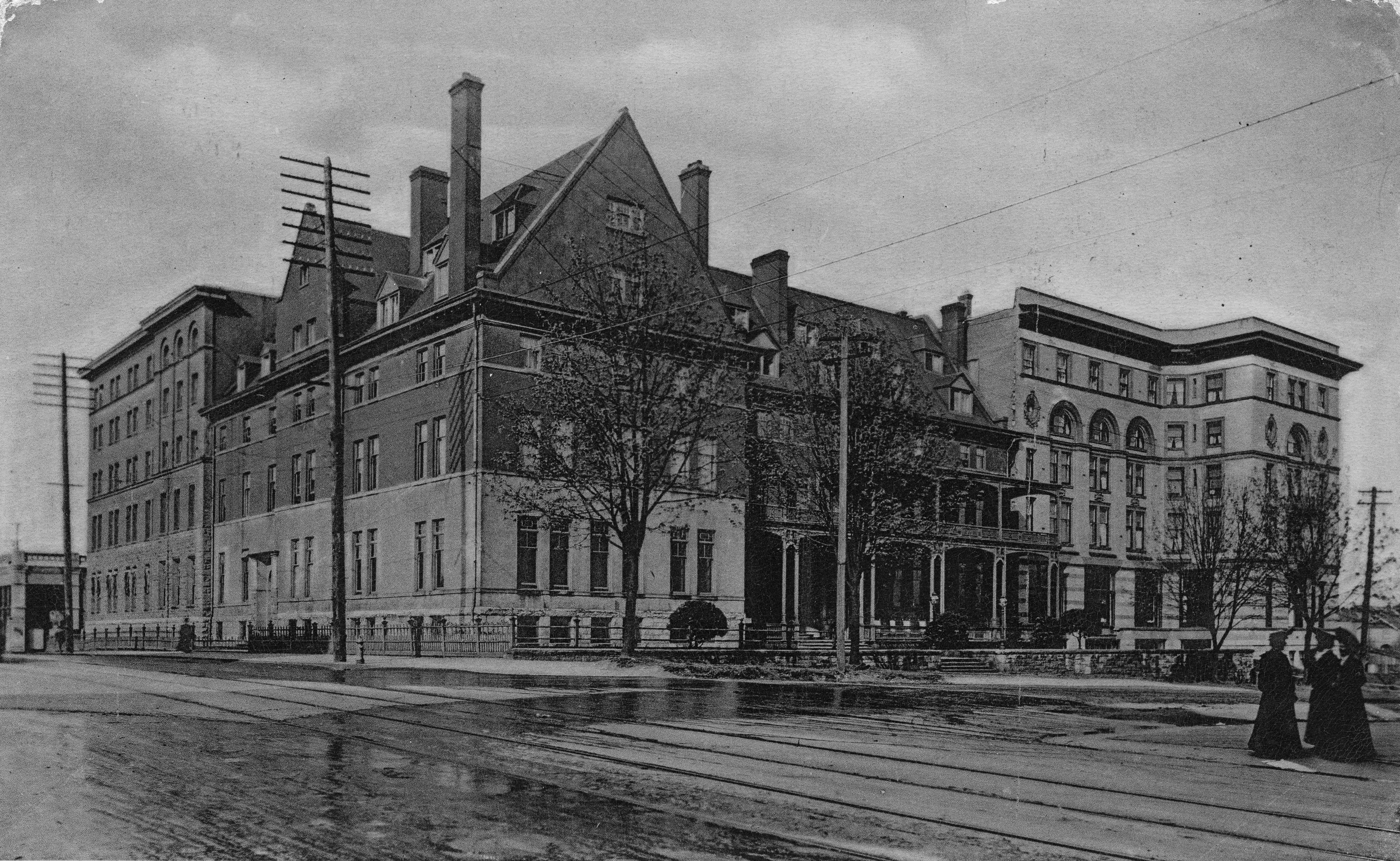
In lieu of his competition-winning design, Rattenbury planned an Italianate reconstruction of the hotel, seen above. His design was completed only partially, as shown below.

The railway closed the hotel in 1913. That year, it began construction on a massive new Hotel Vancouver designed by Francis S. Swales. Accordingly, the original Sorby hotel was demolished; however, part of Rattenbury's 1902 addition was left standing and was incorporated into the design. The new hotel opened in 1916. This hotel closed in 1939 and was demolished in 1949. The third and final Hotel Vancouver, which was built by the Canadian National Railway, opened in 1939 and remains in operation today.
