= Thomas Charles Sorby =

English-Canadian architect (1836–1924)

Thomas Charles Sorby FRIBA FGS
- Born: 1836; Chevet, West Riding of Yorkshire, England
- Died: 15 November 1924 (aged 87–88); Victoria, British Columbia, Canada
- Occupations: Architect in England and Canada

Thomas Charles Sorby FRIBA FGS (1836 – 15 November 1924) was an English-Canadian architect. Born in Wakefield, England, he emigrated to Canada in 1883, where he worked for much of the time in Vancouver and Victoria, British Columbia.

In England, as surveyor of Police Buildings in the Metropolitan District and in the County Courts of England and Wales, Sorby designed police stations and court houses in stone and brick, frequently in the Classical style. When working independently, he designed churches and mansions in the same materials, but often in the Gothic Revival or Arts and Crafts style. However in Canada he was employed for some years by the Canadian Pacific Railway; a client which often required chalet-style hotel and depot designs in wood,

Sorby entered a large number of design competitions for civic buildings and town plans in England and Canada. In England he invented a new type of skylight, and a remotely-controlled sash fastener, which he used in his own building designs.

== Background ==
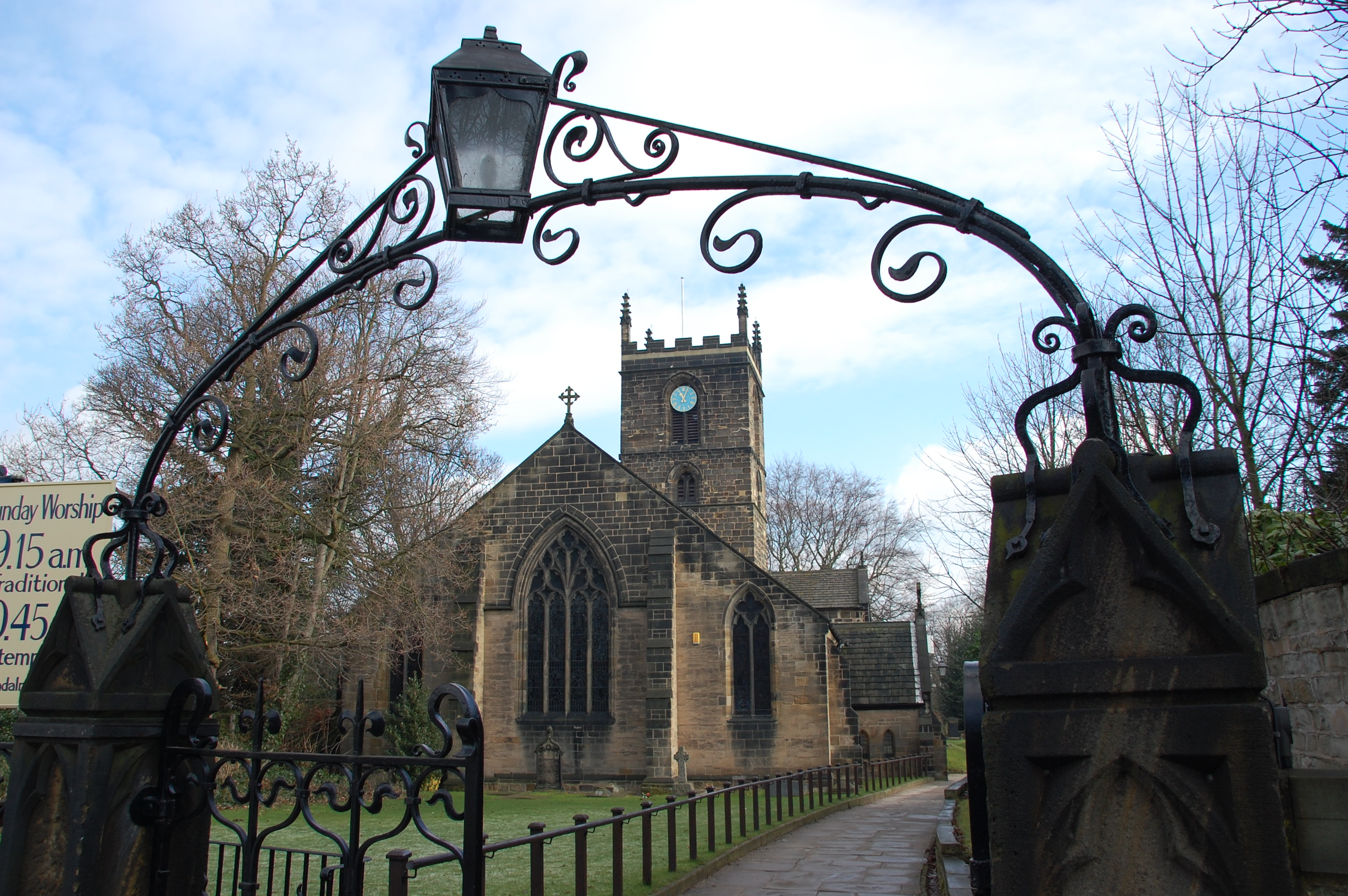
St Helen's Church, Sandal Magna, where Sorby was baptised

Sorby was "a member of an old Sheffield family", according to the Sheffield Independent newspaper. (Note: The Sheffield Independent may have confused Sorby's family with the family of Henry Clifton Sorby of Sheffield, or perhaps Sorby really was related to the Sheffield Sorbys) However, he and his immediate family were from Wakefield. His parents were Thomas Sorby (1798–1845), (Note: GRO: Deaths Dec 1845 Sorby Thomas Ecclesfield 22 93. Died 3 November 1845, age 47, in Sandal Magna.) a farmer at Brice Hale, Chevet, Wakefield, West Riding of Yorkshire, and Harriet Ann Rayner (1808–1841), who was baptised at Sandal Magna, Wakefield. (Note: NATIONAL ARCHIVE: Select births and christenings 1538–1975. Harriet Anne Rayner. Female. Baptism date 6 August 1808. Sandal Magna, York. Father William Rayner. Mother Amelia. FHL Film Number 558354. GRO: Deaths Mar 1841 Sorby Harriet Ann Ecclesfield 22 123. Died 4 January 1841, at Sandal Magna) Sorby was born in Chevet in 1836, and baptised as Thomas Charles Sorby in St Helen's Church, Sandal Magna, on 2 May 1836. (Note: NATIONAL ARCHIVE: West Yorkshire Births and Baptisms, Sandal Magna St Helen 1836. May 2nd, Thomas Charles, son of Thomas and Harriot Anne, of Chevet, father's profession farmer.) He had one surviving brother, William (1837–1915), a steel manufacturer who emigrated to New Zealand. (Note: GRO: Marriages Sep 1868 Sorby William, and Myra Alsop, Shiffnal 6a 997. William was born 22 June 1837. His father was Thomas Sorby (deceased), farmer. New Zealand Cemetery Records (1800–2007): Northland Cemetery: William Sorby d. died 12 March 1915, aged 77.)

Sorby married Elizabeth née Sorby (1829–1907) on 11 October 1857, in Islington, and they had eight children, born in London. (Note: GRO: Marriages Dec 1857 Sorby Thomas Charles and Sorby Elizabeth, Islington 1b 302. Children (from 1871 and 1881 Census): Alice Elizabeth (1859), Thomas Harold Raynor (1861), Charles Percival (1862), Harriet Maude (1863), William Herbert (1865–1905), Lucy Winifred (1867–1942), Frederick Carr (1870–1896), Bede (1872–1913).) In 1864, the family was living at 15 Bedford Row, London. By the 1870s the family was living at 27 Brunswick Square, London. Sorby emigrated to Canada in 1883. He died on 15 November 1924, in Victoria, British Columbia, and was interred in Ross, Manitoba, Canada.

== Career ==
=== Training ===
Sorby studied architecture in London. He spent time in France, before becoming a pupil of Charles Reeves, with whom he designed Salford County Court.

=== United Kingdom ===
In December 1866, Sorby was appointed, by the Secretary of State for the Home Department, to the Surveyorships of Police Buildings in the Metropolitan District and in the County Courts of England and Wales, following the death of his mentor Charles Reeves, who had held tenure. While holding that surveyorship "for less than two years", Sorby was involved in the erection of numerous civic buildings, but his lengthy 1867 efforts to negotiate with Merthyr Tydfil corporation to build a town hall came to nothing. By 1871 he was architect to the Lords Commissioners of Her Majesty's Treasury. Sorby was "by some accounts a difficult character, however he was not shy of writing in to building journals to assist on the subject of construction techniques.

=== Canada ===
Between 1883 and 1887, Sorby was working in Montreal, and Vancouver where "his work [was] well regarded and extensive". From 1887 he was designing commercial buildings and residences in Victoria, British Columbia. "He was also working on plans for the development of Victoria's Inner Harbour and port facilities".

== Selected works in the United Kingdom ==
=== Former County Court House, Salford, 1860–1865 ===
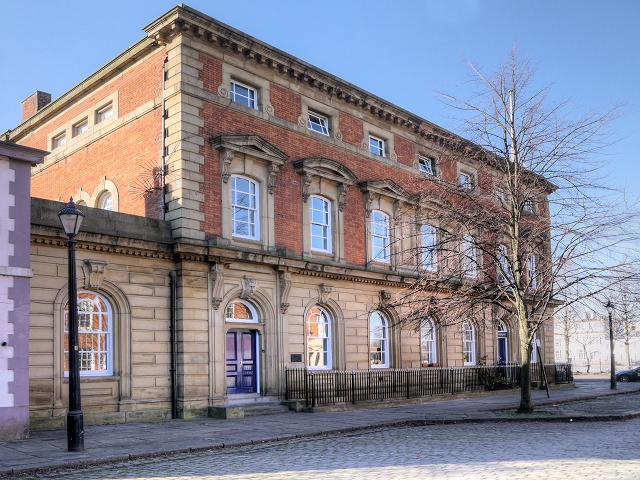
Former Court House, Salford, in 2014

Charles Reeves and his pupil, Sorby, designed this listed building in "brick with stone-faced rusticated ground storey and dressings", which was completed by 1865. It has a doorway with a fanlight and carved keystone in its archway, and a carved stone relief of the Royal Arms over a window. L. S. Lowry sketched the arch behind the building. It was closed, and has been converted into flats.

=== Grove Road Cemetery Chapels, Harrogate, 1863 ===
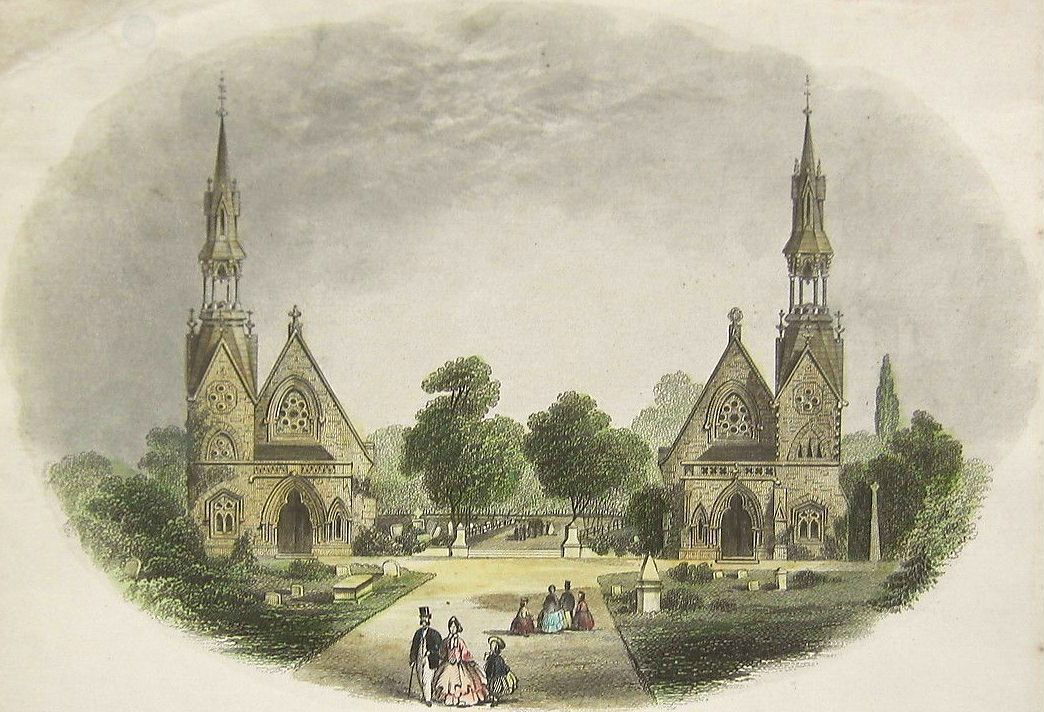
Grove Road Cemetery Chapels, in 1863

Grove Road Cemetery, Harrogate, once had two chapels with spires, designed by Sorby, at a cost of £5,000 (equivalent to £543,157 in 2025). There were 40 entries for the design competition for this job, and Sorby achieved first prize. John Peele Clapham laid the foundation stone for the non-denominational chapel on 23 May 1863. The right hand chapel (as seen in the picture) was nonconformist, and the land in front of it was not consecrated. The left hand chapel was ecclesiastical (Anglican) and was consecrated along with the land in front of it. Having processed from the National School to the cemetery with interested parties including eleven clergymen and various Burial Board members, the Bishop of Ripon consecrated the episcopalian half of the cemetery and the Anglican chapel on 23 April 1864. Although the chapels formed an "attractive feature in the landscape", they were both demolished in 1958 to create more burial space, but the lodge – also designed by Sorby – remains.

=== Town Hall, Bromley, 1863 ===
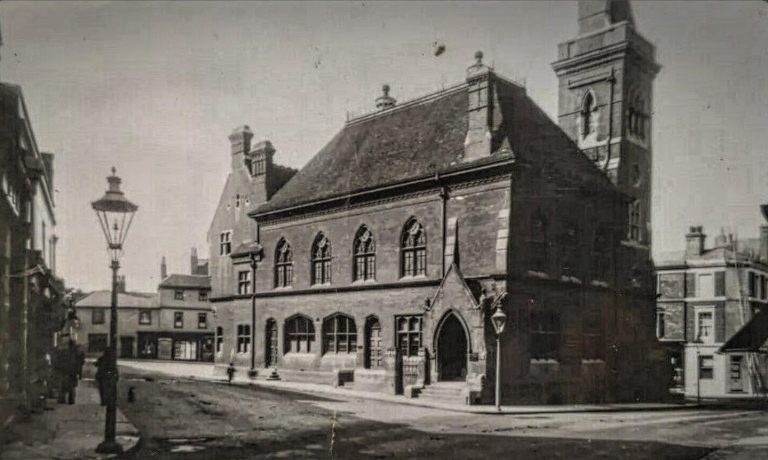
Bromley Town Hall in 1899

Sorby designed Bromley's Town Hall, completed in 1863. It was paid for by Cole-Childs, the local lord of the manor and Deptford coal merchant, who also manufactured the bricks. Bromley's Market Square was redesigned to accommodate it, and the building included at different times a police station, a cell, a fire station, a free library, and a room for the town corporation's meetings. However it was never used as a town hall because Bromley was run by the Vestry, which did not use the building. It was eventually rented by an estate agent, the local paper said it was "monstrous", and it was demolished in 1933, being replaced in 1906 by a new town hall designed by R. Frank Atkinson.

Sorby later designed a villa in Bromley for J. T. Davies, in 1872.

=== Congregational Church, Ringwood, Hampshire, 1861–1863 ===
According to The Builder in 1863, Sorby originally designed this church, in 1863. However Historic England attributes the design to Thomas Hellyer, in 1866.

=== Pair of semi-detached villas, Peterborough, 1865 ===
Sorby designed this pair of villas in 1865, and a description, drawing and plan were published in the Building News.

=== Wyggeston's Hospital and entrance lodge, Leicester, 1864–1868 ===
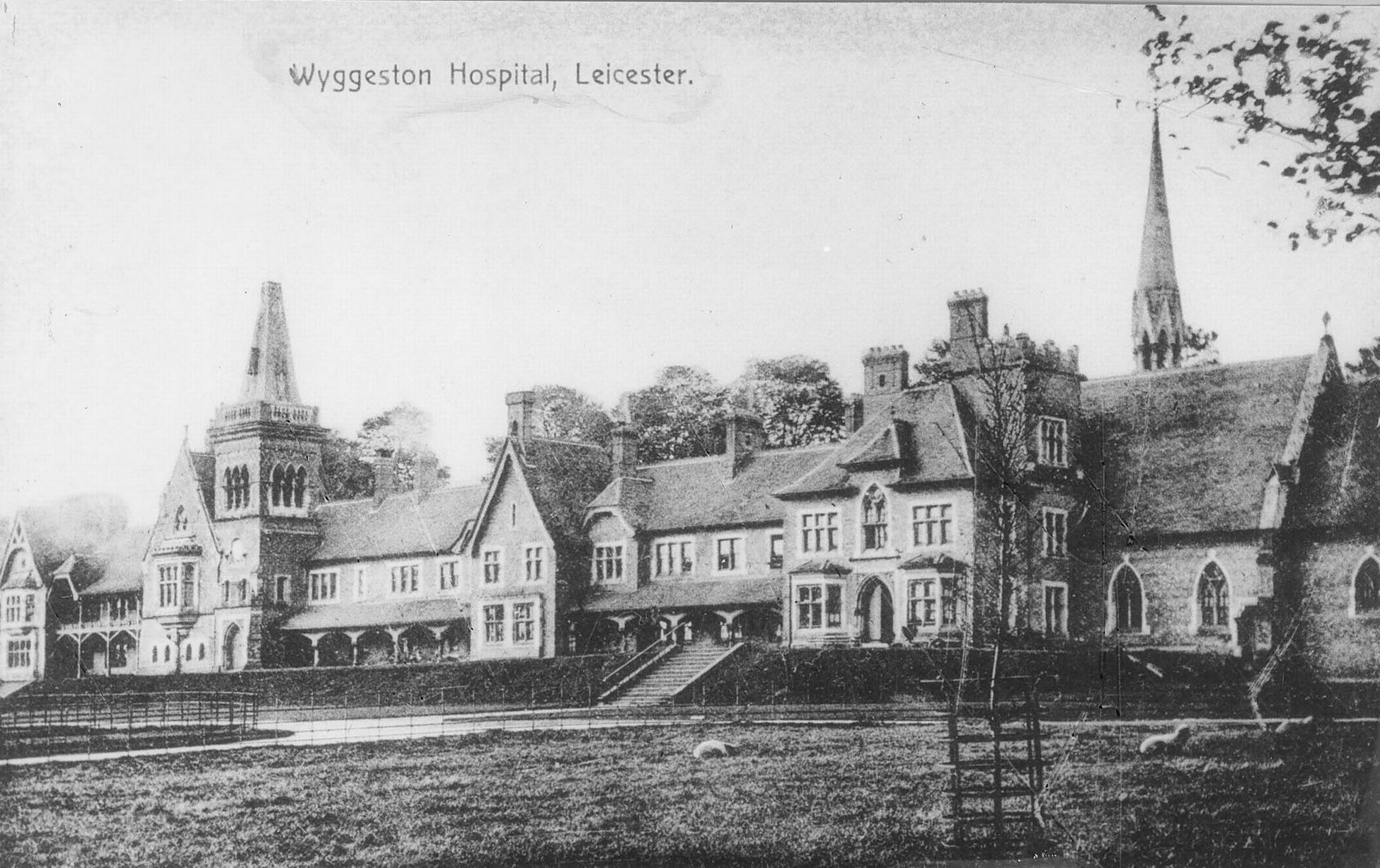
Wyggeston's Hospital, before 1914

Sorby won a competition for the design of this building in 1864, and it was completed in 1868. It was demolished and replaced with William House in 1966 or 1967. As of 2014 it had become a retirement home.

=== Former Court House, Bolton, 1866–1869 ===
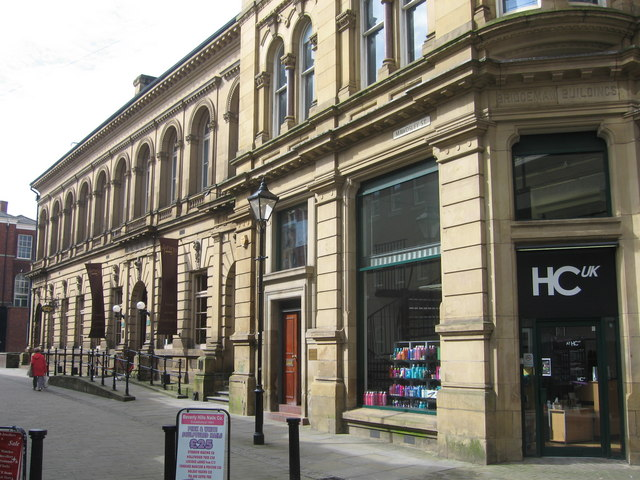
Former Court House, Bolton (left), 2009

This is a listed building in Mawdsley Street, Bolton, Greater Manchester. It was designed by Sorby in 1866, possibly in collaboration with Reeves, who was surveyor of county courts at that time. The exterior is of rusticated ashlar, and it has a slate roof. There are two storeys. The frontage has entrances below, with "paired panelled and studded doors", and a row of ten round-headed and balustraded windows above. "All openings have initials VR, superimposed on foliate key-stones". There are Corinthian capitals, and a "Modillion eaves cornice". The back of the building is of brick, with windows for the court room.

Following closure, the building became a benefit office. From 1996 it was Harvey’s Café Bar, a public house with a restaurant. That business closed in 2017, and the building was reopened in 2018 as a restaurant called The Courthouse.

=== St Michael and All Angels Church, Neepsend, Sheffield, 1867 ===
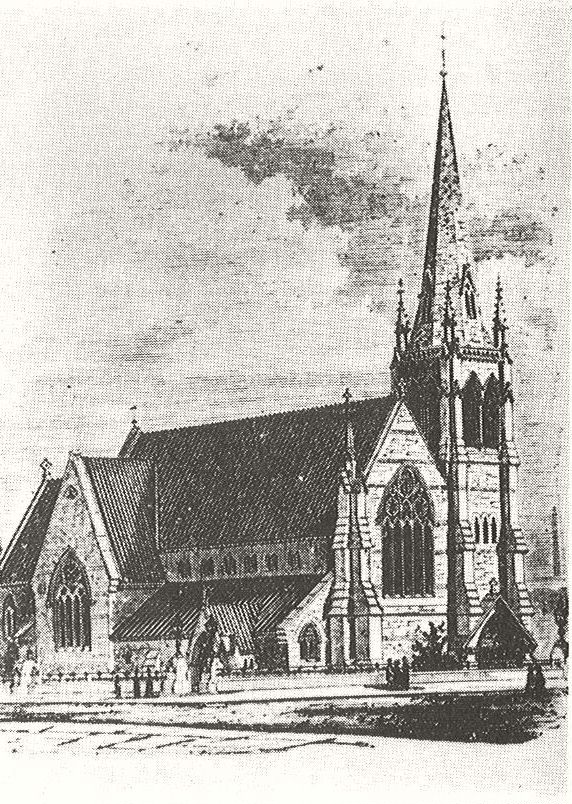
Original design for St Michael, Neepsend

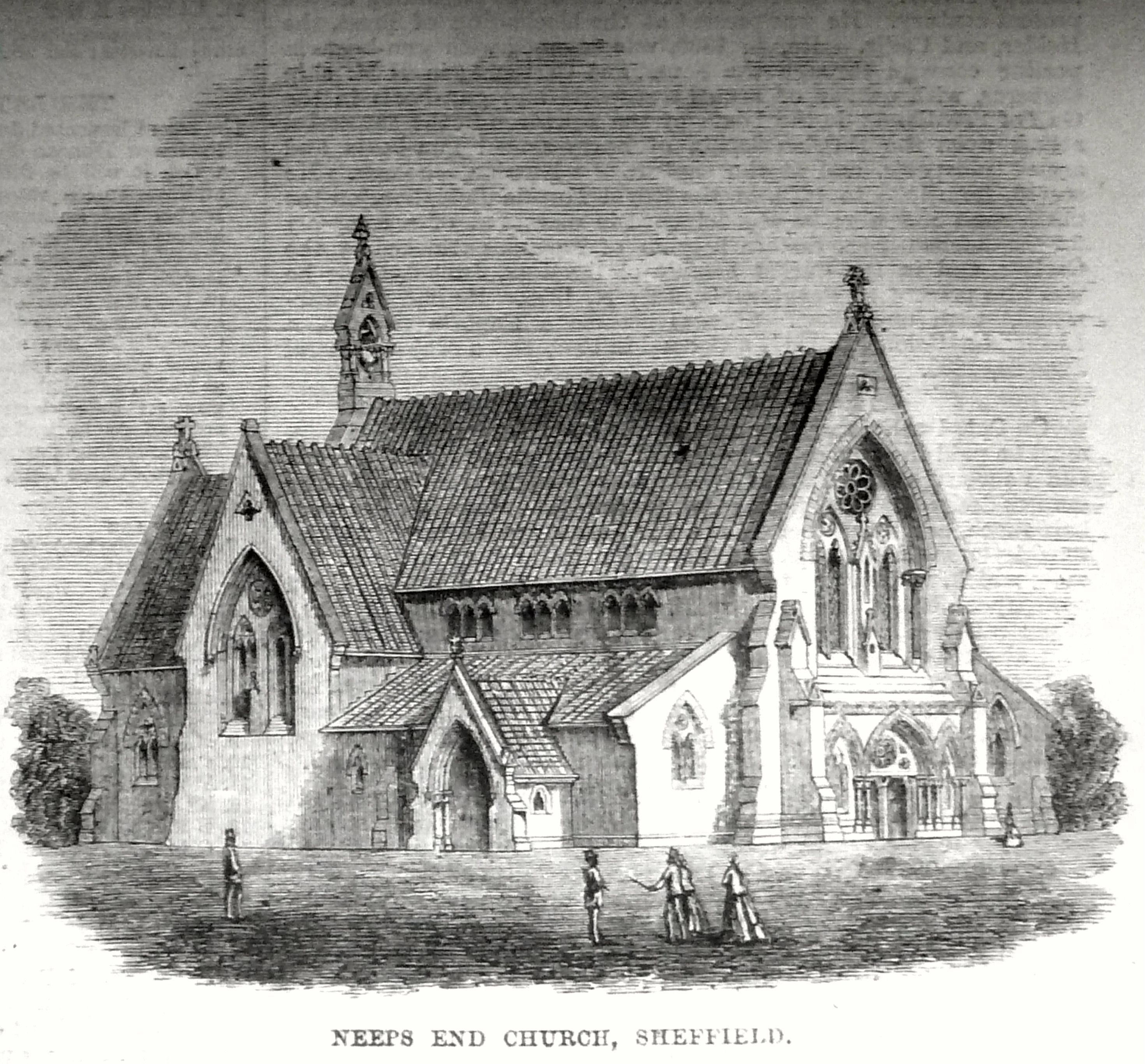
St Michael, Neepsend

St Michael and All Angels, Neepsend, was consecrated in November 1867. It was built for the Church Extension Society, in an area with a background of severe flood, poverty, dirt and smoke, and was "therefore ... very plain in character". The nave was 90 ft (27 m) long, and 60 ft (18 m) wide, including the aisles, and contained seating for 1,000. The font, the carving and the heating apparatus were gifts from local worthies. The Illustrated London News said:

The nave is divided from the aisles by an arcade of three large arches, and the transept arches, supported upon short, massive piers.The chancel is 30 ft (9.1 m) by 22 ft (6.7 m) and, like the nave, is spanned by a bold, open-timber roof. The east and west windows are large and bold, and filled in with geometric tracery. The transept windows correspond, but are smaller. The principal porch is on the north side, and is an impressive feature. A tower and spire were originally contemplated, but were abandoned – at any rate, for the present. The materials are Burbage, Greenside and Matlock stone, and covered with Taylor's patent tiles ... The architect was Mr. Thomas Charles Sorby of London, and the contractor is Mr. James White, of Sheffield.

St Michael was closed in 1952, when the congregation moved to Holy Trinity, Wicker. It was demolished in 1955.

=== Former Police Station, Walthamstow, 1867 ===
In 1867, Sorby was calling for tenders for the Metropolitan Police Station, Walthamstow, although historian Bryn Elliott's monograph Walthamstow Police Stations 1841–2000 does not mention a new station build in the 1860s. The job could have been a renovation or extension.

=== Former Police Station, Poplar, 1867–1868 ===
In 1867, Sorby was calling for tenders for the Metropolitan Police Station, Poplar, London. This was an adaptation of former stables for police use, built to Sorby's design. It was demolished in the 1890s to make way for a new police station.

=== Former Lambeth Magistrates Court, London, 1868–1869 ===
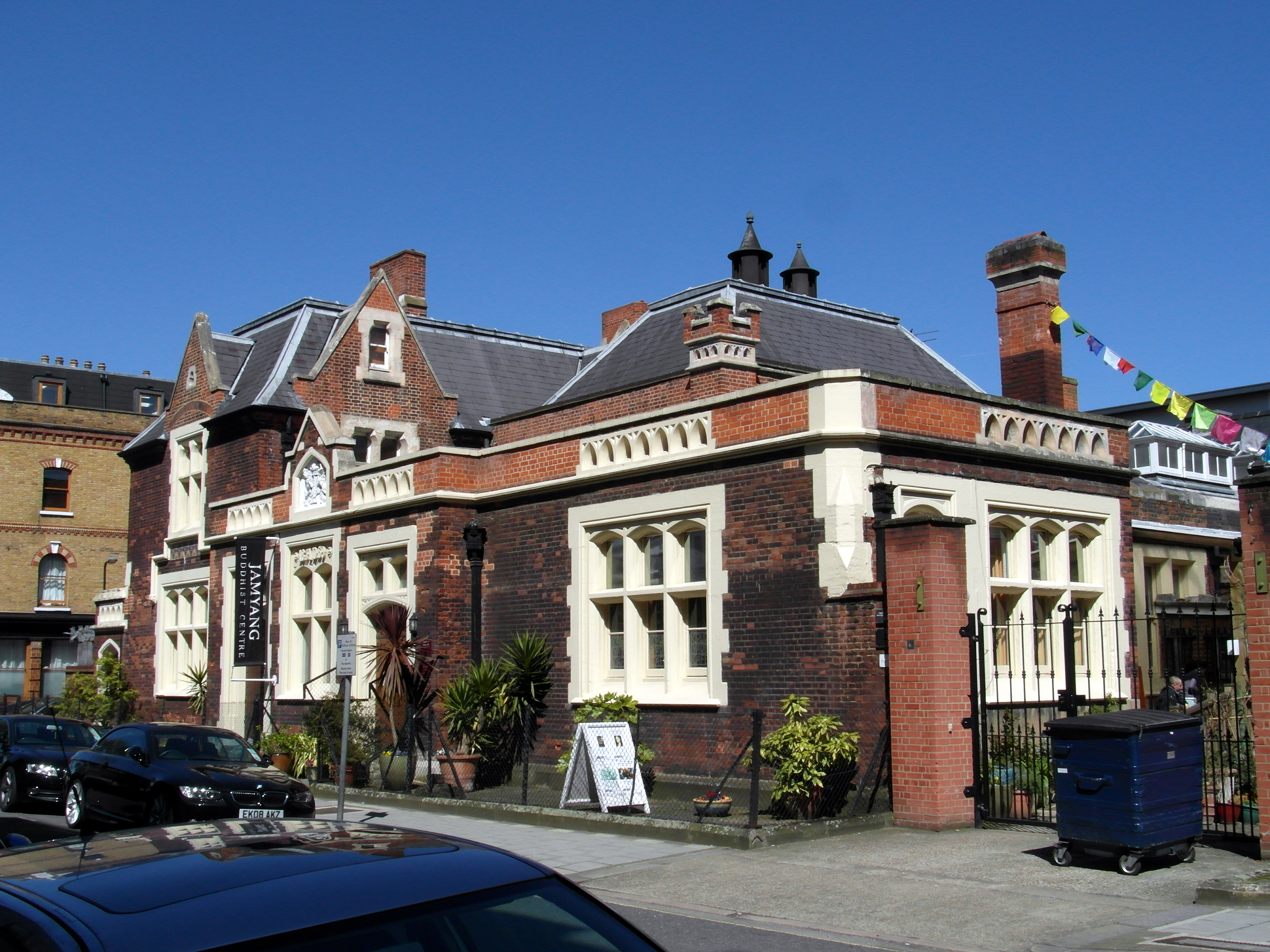
Former Lambeth Magistrates' Court, in 2013

The former Lambeth Magistrates' Court, was designed by Sorby in 1868, and completed in 1869. It is located in Lambeth's Renfrew Road conservation area, in what was in 1868 called Lower Kennington Lane. It is a listed, Gothic Revival building of one to three storeys, with a cell block on the south side. It is "built of red brick in Flemish bond with stone dressings and slate roof". At the front there is a parapet with "three bands of arched fretted balustrading". Above the north window, which has arched and fanlighted doors with "elaborate hinges" on either side, is the royal coat of arms and the date "18 AD 69". In the entrance hall, the chamfered oak beams, well staircase and panelled doors survive, as do the original wooden courtroom fittings, some 19th-century fireplaces, and some cells with "Victorian sanitary fittings". It is the "earliest surviving example of a Criminal Magistrates' court in the Metropolitan area". Around 1930, the building was extended with an extra storey on the north side. The building was closed for court business, and by 2007 it held the Jam Yang Buddhist Centre.

=== Former County Court House and High Court, Leeds, 1868–1869 ===
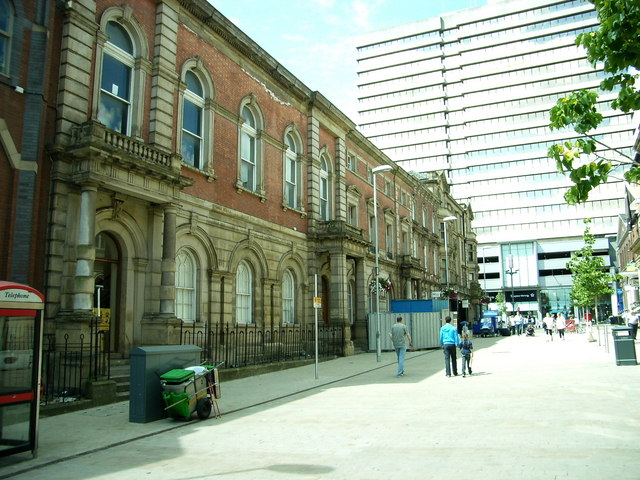
Former County Court House, Leeds

The front elevation of the 1868 building on Albion Place, designed by Sorby, is listed. This listed part formed the combined frontage of the county court and high court, with three porches, basement railings, and a gas light. The left hand range was the county court, which has round-headed windows and two floors. The right hand range with its three storeys was by 1899 the court of bankruptcy, that section being later used as the high court. The exterior ground floor is rusticated ashlar, and the upper floors are red brick. The cornice which runs across them both is dentilled.

In 1868 the build by Sorby was described as an "enlargement" due to "great increase of business", not a new build. This extension started in July 1868. The existing county court room was not altered. On the ground floor, a large public office, a private office and a strong room were added, with a basement containing lavatories, a kitchen, and cellaring. On the first floor Sorby added "a counsel and attorney's retiring room, clerk's office, and two smaller offices ... [also] a store room for papers and records, three bedrooms, and store room for office keeper, and two smaller offices". A portico with a balcony was added to the existing main entrance, and the new doorway at the west corner gave "access to a spacious staircase". To the front elevation, circular-headed and pedimented windows, and the cornice, were added at the same time.

This building has had "major additions and alterations". It was converted into shops and offices around 1987, and as of 2022 it contained a branch of WH Smith.

=== Former County Court House, Brighton, 1868–1869 ===
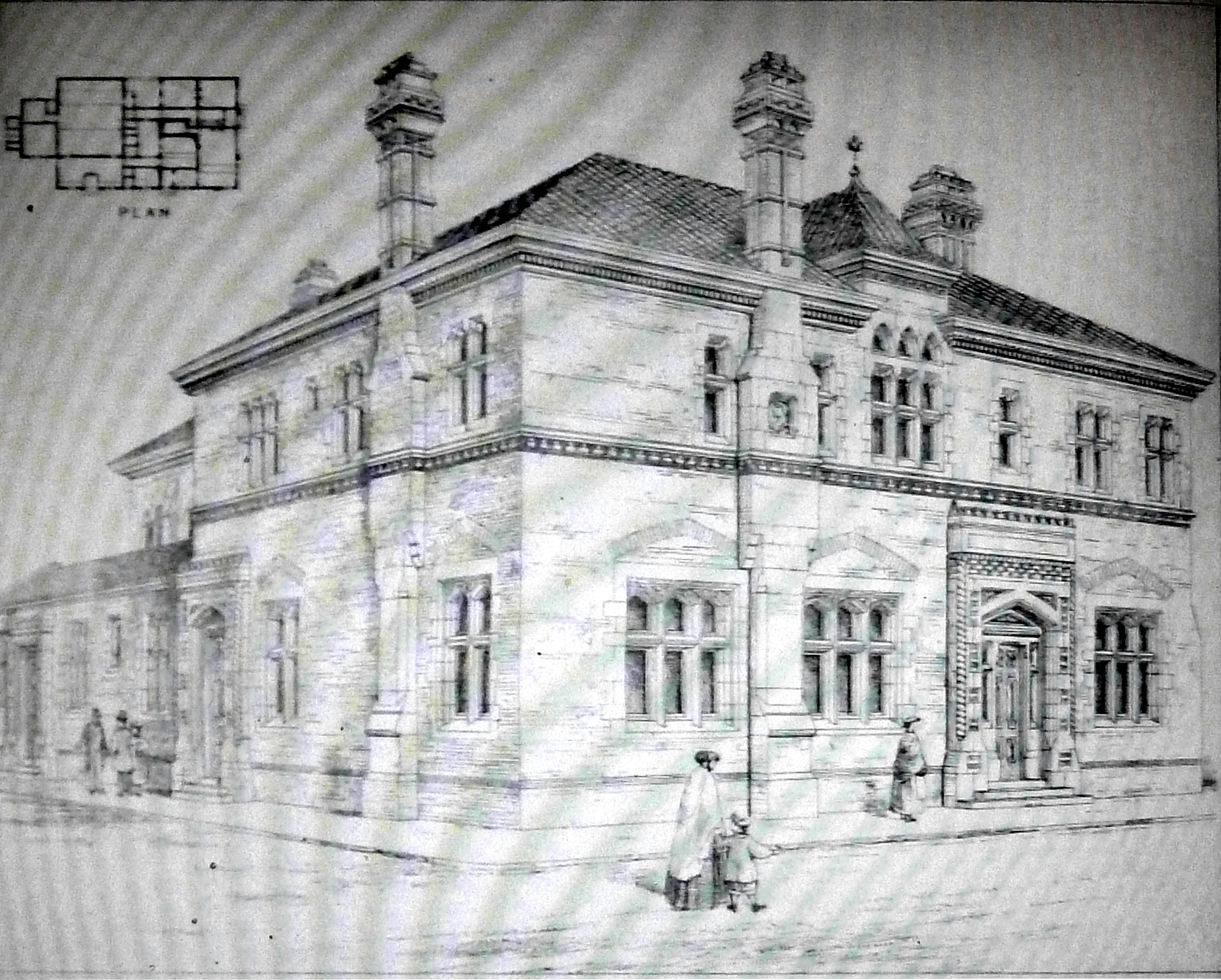
Architectural drawing of Brighton County Court, 1868

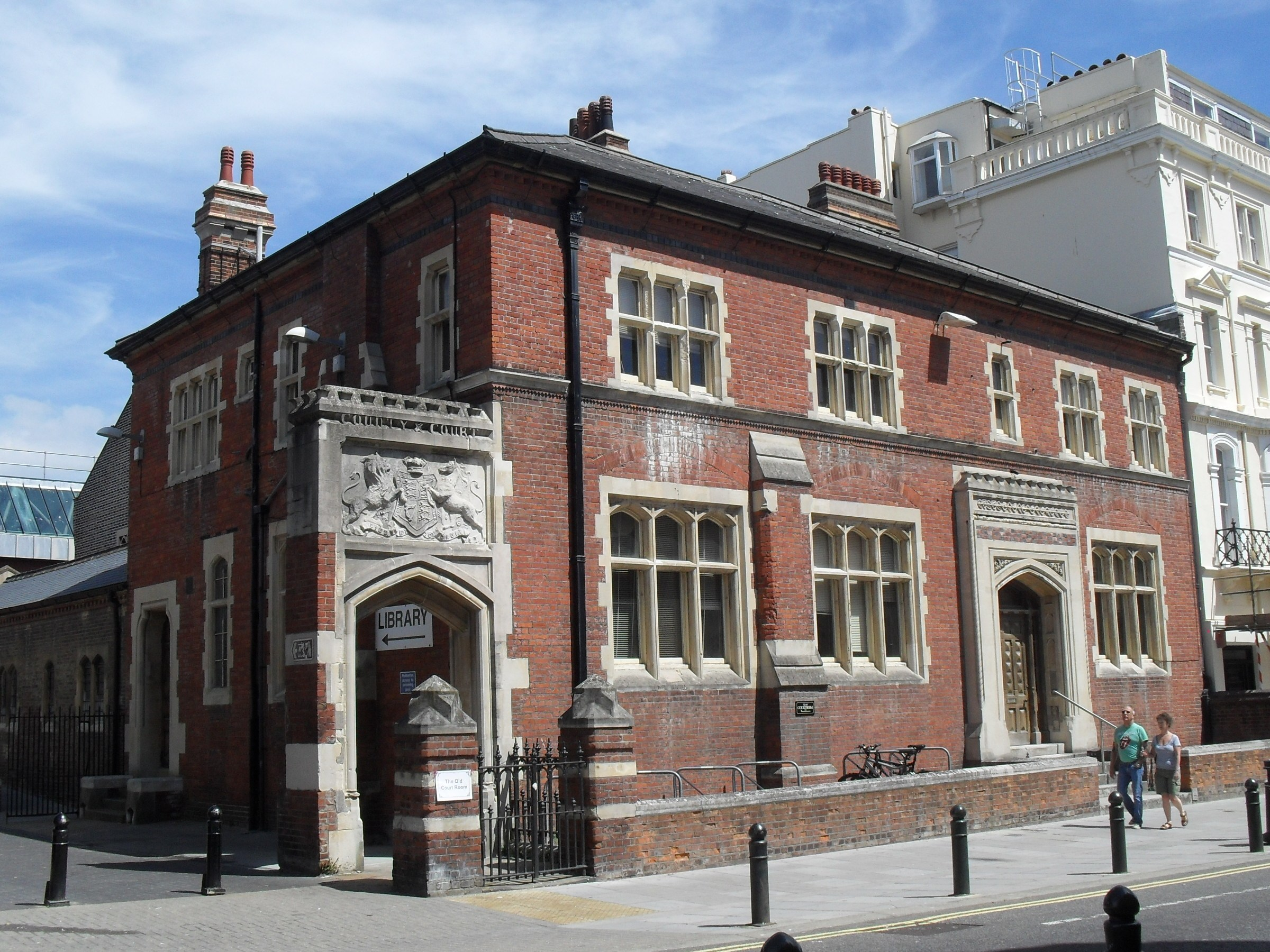
Former Brighton County Court, in 2010

This is a listed building, in Church Street, Brighton, close to Brighton Pavilion. It was designed in 1868 by Sorby, as County Court Surveyor, to replace an inadequate and temporary room in Brighton Town Hall (built 1832), which was threatened with "notice to quit at any time". Due to Council prevarication, the build was delayed, but was eventually carried out "nearly opposite the Corn Exchange ... at the bottom of Church Street, then occupied by an old tenement and a slaughter house". It was designed with a public office, a bailiff's office, a registrar's office, a judge's room with an "open timber roof", retiring and consulting rooms, and cellars. On the first floor were "additional offices and apartments for the residence of the office-keeper". The red bricks were tile-covered, the stone dressings were of Bath stone, and the visible interior woodwork was of Stettin oak. Note the fake brick arches in Sorby's drawing (pictured), giving the impression of a more ancient building. The building was opened for court business on 1 July 1869.

Once built, The two-storey building received favourable reviews. It was in Gothic Revival style in red brick with stone dressings, but had "almost the uniformity of a classic building". The front windows were "mullioned and traced", and it had two grand entrances, for judge and public. The judge's entrance had a solid oak door and Gothic stone arch, carved with acorns and oak leaves, with Queen Victoria's monogram, V.R. The public entrance had the royal arms carved above it, carved by one Mr Bayly of Brighton. Inside were two courts and many other rooms. The judge's court was well-lit and ventilated, was heated by hot air and water pipes, and had "an open Gothic roof of stained wood, the timbers resting on carved stone corbels". The judge had a canopied seat, carved with olive and oak leaves. The building also had a strong room for valuable documents. In the judge's and registrar's rooms were serpentine chimney pieces, carved with the V.R. monogram. The building still exists, but by 1992 the lower floor was occupied by a library, and the top floor was vacant.

=== Former County Court House, Walsall, 1868–1869 ===
This was an extension, built to a budget of £4,500 (equivalent to £523,759 in 2025), by Sorby. The extension was built behind the pre-existing county court offices in Lichfield Street, Walsall, Staffordshire, which had been converted from a library into a court house around 1851. It is now a listed building. The extended building was reopened on 13 April 1869. The extension was in classical style, including Ionic and Doric orders. Its court room was "fitted up ... to enhance ... comfort" and had five "handsome", mahogany-framed windows, and a "large sunlight". There was also a public hall, rooms for judges, counsels and jury, a vestibule, a waiting room for women, a housekeeper's room, lavatories, and "other offices". As of 2011 it had been converted into a pub.

=== Former County Court House, Gravesend, 1869–1870 ===
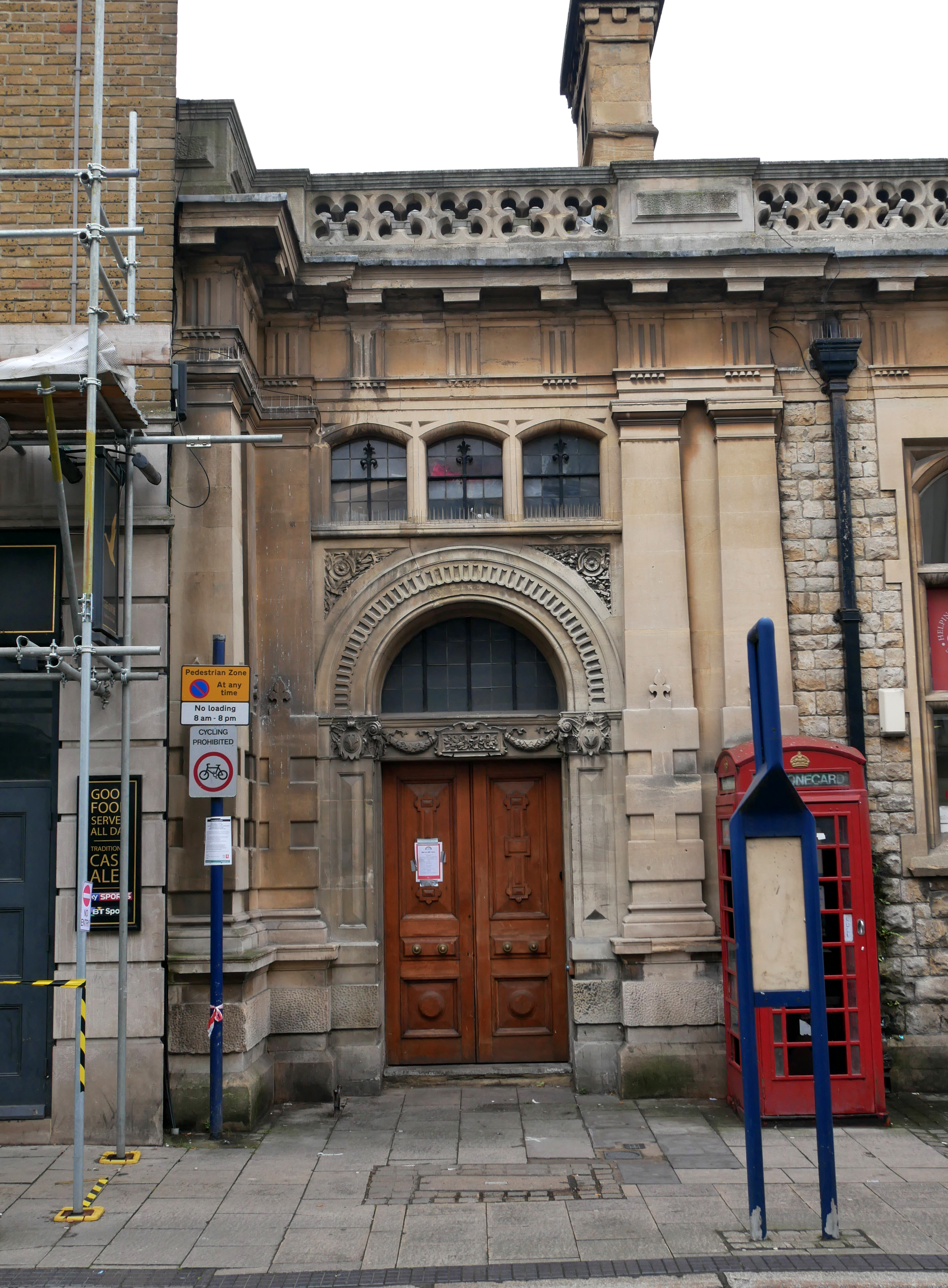
Former County Court House, Gravesend, 2020

This is a Grade II listed building. The former County Court House, King Street, Gravesend, Kent, was designed by Corby in 1869, as surveyor to the Crown for County Courts. It is a stone building, built to include Dennett's fire-proof system. As of 2022 it was temporarily inhabited by a community centre called The Gr@nd. English Heritage describes it as follows:

One storey ashlar with stone dressings. Slate roof. Balustrade with quatrefoil motif. Triglyph frieze. 4 couples pilasters. 2 round-headed doorcases with decorated spandrels. Double doors. Fanlights having swag moulding incorporating the date. Plinth. 3 pointed mullioned windows, 2 with 2 lights, and the centre one with 3.

=== Former Police Station, Clerkenwell, 1869–1870 ===
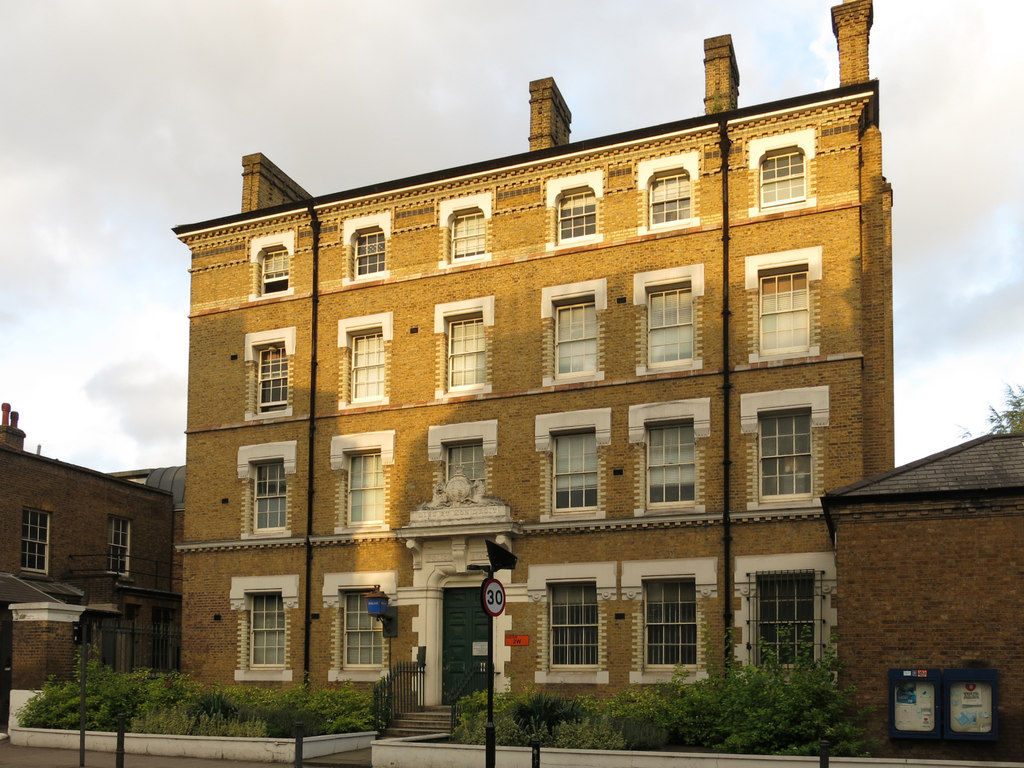
Former Police Station, Clerkenwell, in 2019

This is a grade II listed building in "Italianate style" with "ornament in loose, almost brutal, manner" according to Historic England, replacing a previous station of 1842, which had been overtaken by railway development. Sorby, who also designed Kennington and Rochester Row police stations, designed this building in 1869 while still surveyor to the Metropolitan Police. It was completed in 1870 at a cost of c. £8,000 (equivalent to £823,312 in 2025). Building News described it as follows:

The building is five storeys high, and has accommodation for 96 constables, two inspectors, one superintendent and one district superintendent. There are eight cells, and they have been fitted up with all the latest improvements. Each of the floors are on an average 11 feet (3.4 metres) high, and are well lighted and ventilated. The station is built with picked stock bricks, and the front windows and doorways have Portland and Tisbury stone dressings. It has a commanding appearance and is one of the largest and best-arranged police-stations in the metropolis".

This yellow-brick building was later known as King's Cross Road Police Station. In 1992 the police station was closed, and its rear outbuilding became the mounted division's stables. The building has since been a traffic warden's centre, and as of 2022 was set for development.

=== Former County Court House, Cheltenham, 1868–1870 ===
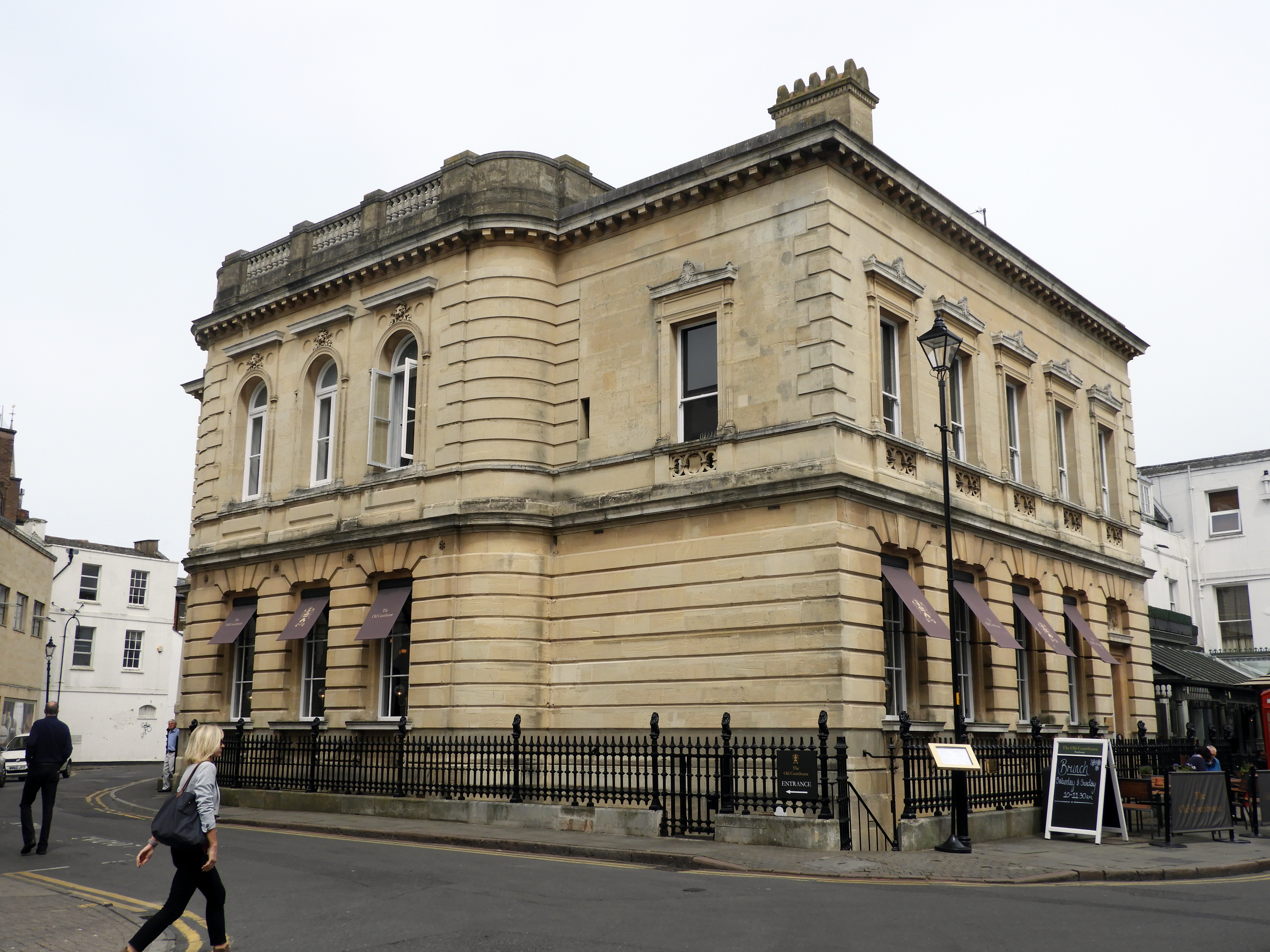
Former County Court House, Cheltenham

This is a listed building on County Court Road (formerly Regent Street), Cheltenham, Gloucestershire, designed by Sorby in 1868 and completed in 1870. It was built on the site of the previous county court – said to be a "damp, dismal barn" – and was opened with "very little ceremonial" on 6 January 1871. However the Cheltenham Examiner bemoaned its location, saying that "one can but regret that such a building should be so miserably located, and its beauty so completely lost". Historic England describes the materials of the building as follows:

in Italianate style, dated 1870 above the public entrance door ... Postlip stone ashlar over brick, with Portland, Polyphant and Doulting stone dressings, and brick to the rear; the building has a slate roof and tall lateral stack, with cornice and acroteria off-centre left, and iron railings and gates with ashlar end pier.

This courthouse is a two-storey building with a basement, and with railings featuring lions. The north-west elevation is apse-shaped, and encloses a public staircase. The first floor of the building contains a court room whose decorations and fittings still existed as of 1972, and judges' rooms. On the ground floor are rooms for the bailiffs and clerks, and a hallway. At the top of the staircase is a decorative ceiling frieze. The exterior stone walls are rusticated, and there are lion heads over some windows. There are steps up to the carved public door, which is detailed with "V.R." The porch has Doric capitals, and a coat of arms above. Part of the building has a balustrade around the roof.

=== "Whitehill" residence, Luton, 1869–1870 ===
This residence, "Whitehill", in Luton, Bedfordshire, was designed in 1869 by Sorby for Richard Brown, of H. Brown & Sons, Luton, and completed in 1870 at a cost of £3,500 (equivalent to £360,199 in 2025). It is a listed building.

"Whitehill" is built of "plum coloured Luton grey bricks with ashlar dressings", and has a "two-gabled front", "various other gables", and "much cornicing". It has several bay windows, and a "recessed porch above which [the] wall is carried up to form a parapet at eaves level". When listed in 1975, it still had its mullioned windows. It originally had a Broseley tiled roof with "ridges and knobs applied". Pine, pitch pine and oak were used for the internal joinery, the pine being "bright yellow" and "slightly stained and varnished". The main windows had "Venetian blinds in ornamental cases". The house had seven bedrooms, plus nurseries, dressing rooms, attics, cellars, kitchen and pantry, besides a knife room. The main floor included a dining room, drawing room, library, and "Mr Brown's room".

=== Former County Court House, Gainsborough, 1871 ===
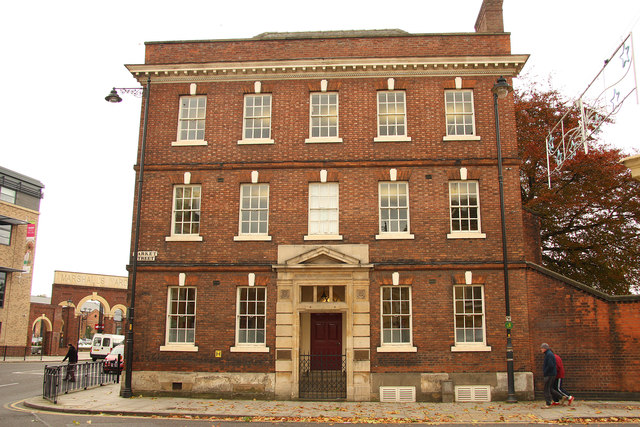
Former County Court, in 2012

This is a grade II* listed building, and the subject of a conversion by Sorby. It was originally a house designed by Nicholas Hawksmoor for Mr Eastland Hawksmore in the Beast Market, Gainsborough, Lincolnshire, in 1759. In 1871, Sorby converted it into a county court and offices, with the court entrances facing Beaumont Street. Hawksmoor's design had originally been "a large square brick building [in 18th-century style], with square windows and doors, and gauged brick strings and arches". Sorby made major changes to the structure. The Building News described the new works:

The architect has relieved this [Georgian style] by insterting two handsome stone dorrways with pediments and severe Grecian mouldings, the one in Beast-market front especially noticeable for the clever manner in which a transome head, with small columns, has been introduced to take off the appearance of excessive height in the doorway. The ground floor is conveniently planned, and contains a large entrance hall for the public, with an open timber roof, and paved with encaustic tiles ... and a large court-room with all conveniences. Females' waiting room, judges' room, jury room, separate W.C.'s for females, judges, clerks and the public, a large public office, bailiff's office, registrar's room, &c. The first floor is let to the registrars for private offices and contains three offices. The second floor contains kitchen, parlour, scullery and two bedrooms for the office-keeper, larder, coal house, &c.

=== Former County Court House, Barnsley, 1871 ===
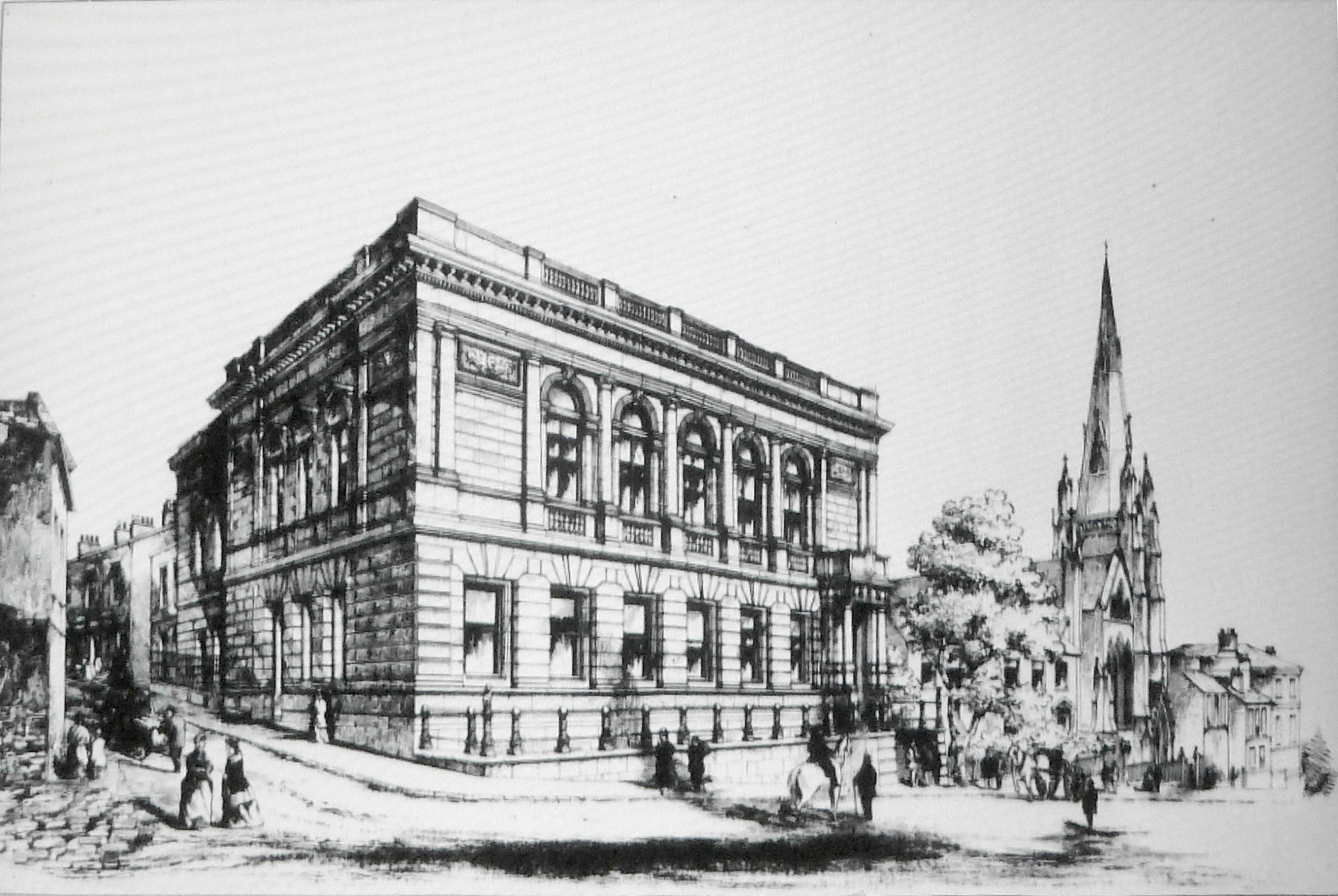
Former Court House, Barnsley, in 1871.

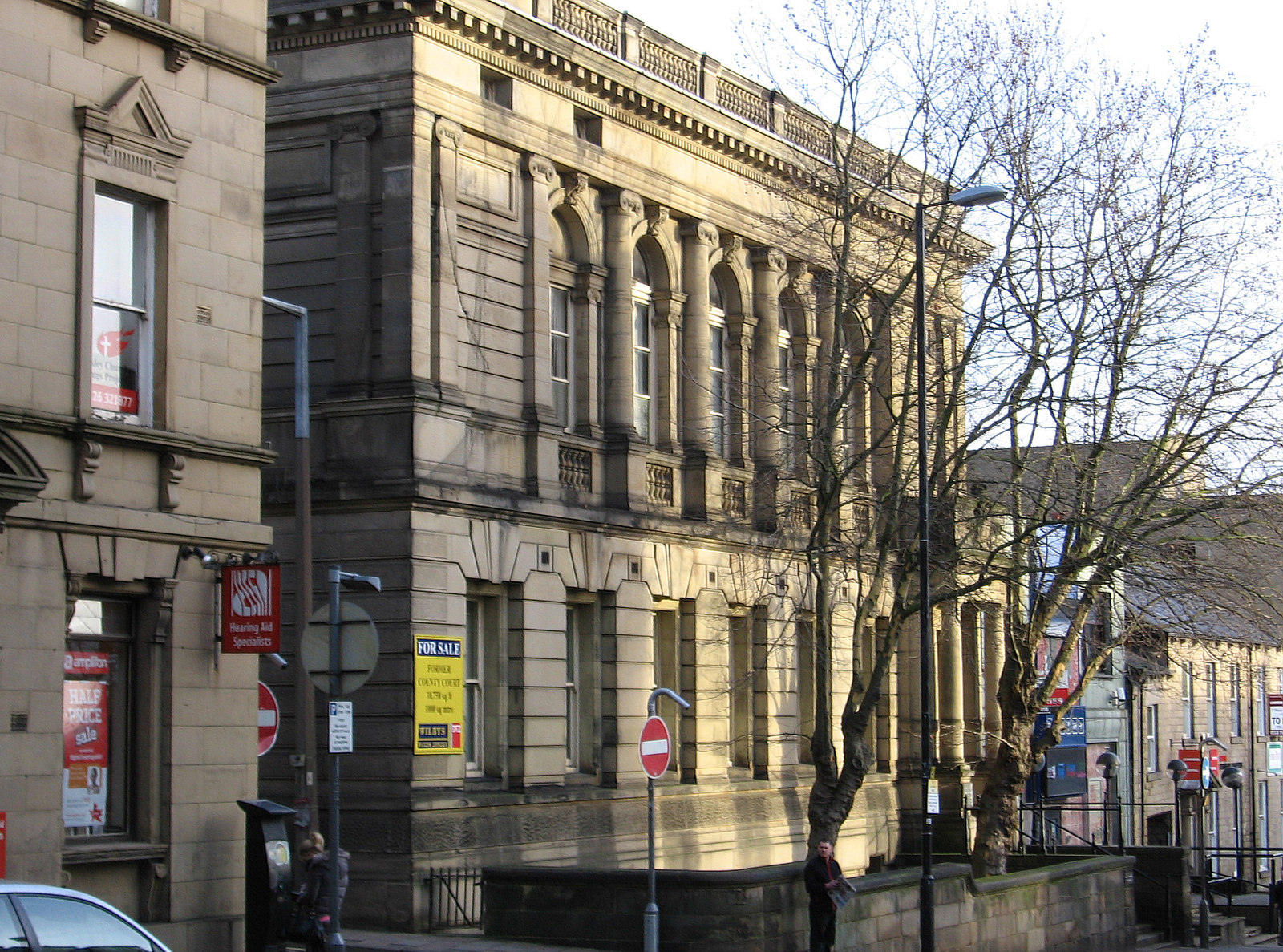
Former Court House, Barnsley, in 2011

This is a grade II listed building, designed by Sorby, who was invited to a celebratory supper at the Royal Hotel, Barnsley, after the opening. The courthouse originally fronted both Regent Street (no.22), and Eastgate, Barnsley, South Yorkshire, and was a new build at the behest of the Lords Commissioners of the Treasury, under whose auspices Sorby was architect. It was opened for court business on 1 December 1871. It was originally budgeted at £4,000 (equivalent to £407,368 in 2025), but ultimately cost £7,000 (equivalent to £712,894 in 2025) for the build, or more than £10,000 (equivalent to £1,018,420 in 2025) including land and other expenses. The Midland Railway Company had taken Barnsley's existing 1861 county court building by Charles Reeves as its station, for waiting rooms and a post office, and paid some of the cost of Sorby's new court house on a nearby site, "two hundred yards higher up Regent Street". An article by Sorby, published in the Building News, describes it thus:

The principal entrance is from Regent Street, by a portico and flight of sixteen steps ... On the ground floor is the public office ... with offices en suite for the registrar, the bankruptcy department and the bailiffs. On the first floor, approached by a flight of stone stairs, is the court ... fitted up in a very complete manner. The retiring room for the judge is on the same level as the raised bench ... with lavatory and water closet attached; this room is approached by a separate staircase from the private entrance in Eastgate. Retiring-rooms are also provided for the jury and counsel, and for females, with the requisite water closets attached. A residence in the rear fronting Eastgate is also provided for the courtkeeper, consisting of a living room, kitchen, scullery &c., and three bed-rooms. The first is faced with Mr Seal's Darfield stone, from the carboniferous sandstone formation. The principal internal joinery is in Stettin oak, the rest in deal ... The passages ... are laid with tiles ... The public office and court are warmed by stoves ... the remainder of the rooms having open fireplaces. Extracting flues ... are provided to most rooms, for ventilation. The court was to have been artificially lighted and ventilated by an improved sunlight, partially invented by the architect ... similar to several to be seen in the London county and police courts ... and in all of the more recent county courts, but the sunlight now going to be suppled ... will be a cheap substitute designed by the Office of Works.

The Barnsley Chronicle commented:

As to its architectural beauties, there can, we think, be only one opinion. It is unquestionably the most handsome of the two or three handsome buildings already existing in Regent-Street, and is alike a credit to the architect from whose designs it has been erected, and an ornament to the town ... The work is throughout of the most solid and substantial character, and every attention has been paid to matters of detail ... The contract for the erection of the structure amounted to £7,250 (equivalent to £738,355 in 2025), but, with the land and extras, the total cost will be over £10,000 (equivalent to £1,018,420 in 2025) ... It is expected that the new court room will be ready for the first sitting in November [1871].

Between 2010 and 2018, many H.M. Courts and Tribunals buildings were sold. Barnsley County Court House was sold for £169,864 in 2012, and by 2018 it housed a solicitor's firm and offices.

=== Former County Court House, Durham, 1871 ===
Sorby designed the Gothic Revival County Court building at the junction of Baths Bridge Road and Old Elvet, Durham. It was completed in 1871. "It [was] built with Waskerley Fell natural coursed blockers, with dressings of Rainton Park stone". (Note: This is possibly the derelict building on Elvet Waterside, here on Google Street View It was a public swimming pool called Elvet Baths, from 1932 It was closed in 2008, it is unlisted, and has been scheduled for demolition.)

=== Former County Court House, Halifax, 1872–1873 ===
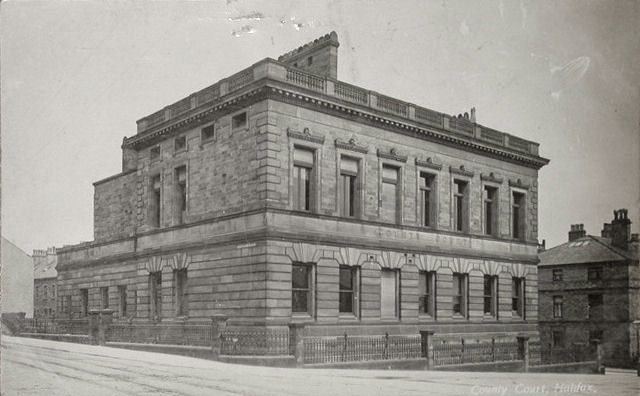
Former County Court House, Halifax, before 1914

This court house in Prescott Street, Halifax, West Yorkshire, was opened on 23 September 1873. It was designed in Grecian style with French details by Sorby as architect for the Lords of the Treasury, and built at a cost of c. £8,000 (equivalent to £752,064 in 2025). In 2016 the court was closed, and operations moved to Bradford, to save running costs.

=== Wardown Park Museum, Luton, 1875–1877 ===
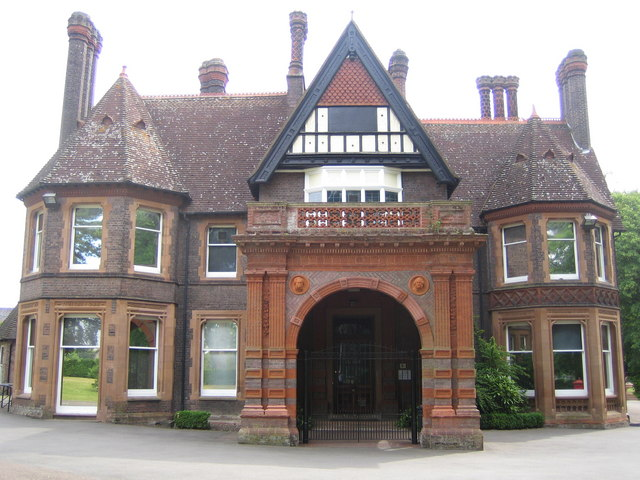
Wardown Park Museum

This is a Grade II listed building. Sorby designed this building, which was begun in 1875, and completed in 1877, as a mansion in Old Bedford Road, Bramingham, Luton, at £10,000 (equivalent to £997,636 in 2025) for the solicitor and businessman Frank Chapman Scargill (1836–1919). It was initially known as "Bramingham Shott", and later named "Wardown". In 1876, Sorby published a request for tenders for a gardener's cottage at Bramingham, which may have been in connection with the Wardown Park job. A building tender, of £569 (equivalent to £56,765 in 2025), was accepted on that occasion.

The building was requisitioned as a military hospital in World War I. It became Luton Museum and Art Gallery in 1931, then Wardown Park Museum.

=== Mansion, The New Grange, Pirton, 1880 ===
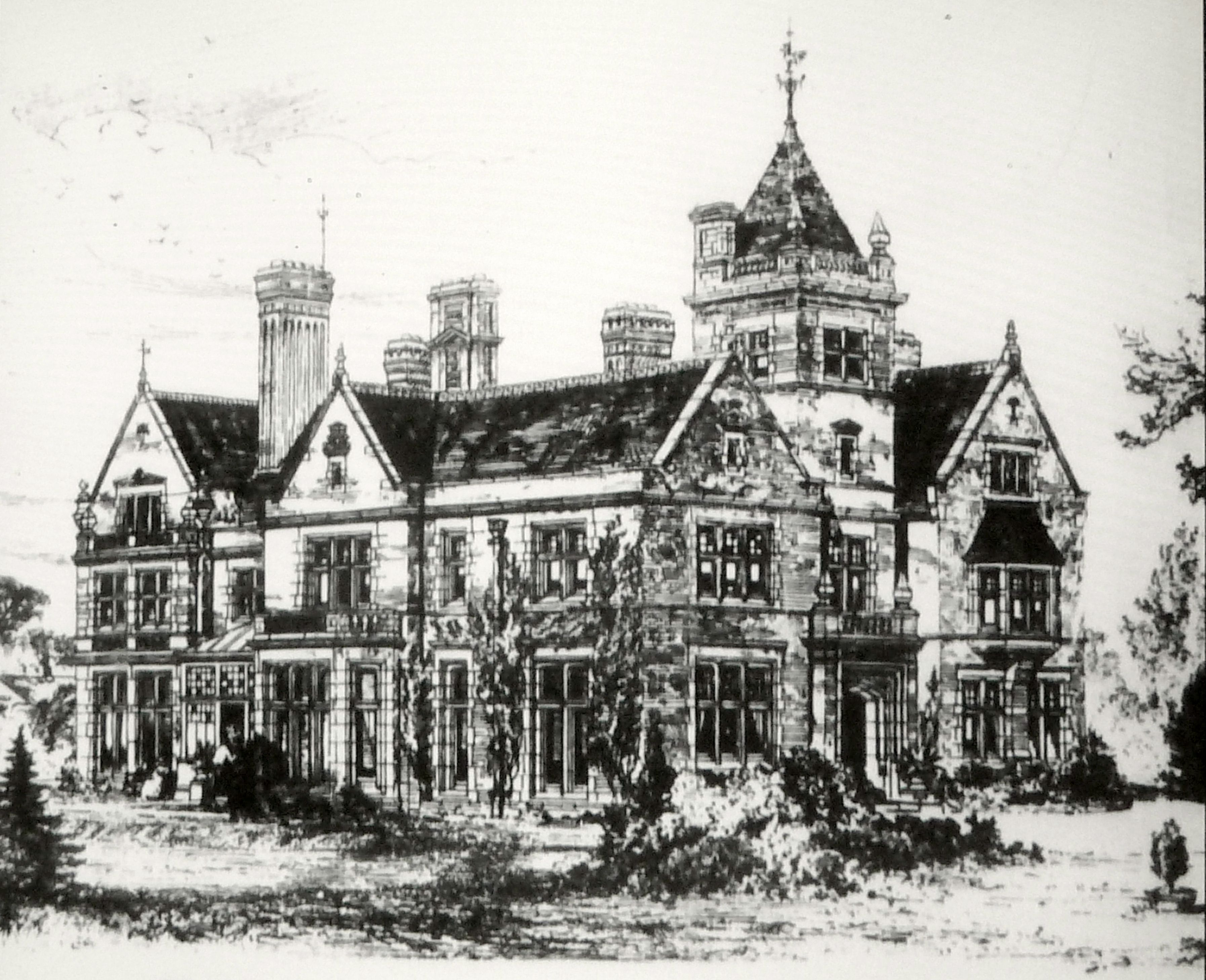
The New Grange, Pirton

This mansion, including entrance gates and lodge, was designed by Sorby and built at Pirton, Hertfordshire, for Mr Hanscombe, and completed in 1880. it was a new build with "extensive views", on a knoll overlooking Pirton Grange – an old moated building which had been the family's ancestral home. (Pirton Grange is listed, but The New Grange is not.). In 1879, while the building was still being erected, a "raising dinner" was arranged for the workmen. At that point, the Building News described the building as follows, revealing the extent of Sorby's involvement in detail, and the domestic style of moneyed clients of that era:

a new residence, which is to replace the Moated Grange, Pirton, on the borders of Beds and Herts. The new mansion is situate on a knoll overlooking its predecessor, which was built in Elizabeth's reign. The house faces the south-east, with extensive views from three fronts. From the inclosed porch a spacious hall conducts to the morning-room and drawing room, which communicate with each other, and with a flower-room, by folding doors. An inner hall and staircase ... for a central feature, round three sides of which the rooms already mentioned open out. The staircase is open-timbered, broad, and easy in rise, with turned and carved balustrading, and with panelled ceiling above. The main wall and staircase, and the garden entrance and passage, demarcate the family rooms and domestic offices. The kitchens, store rooms, and pantry, are planned in communication with the service to the dining-room. On the first-floor are six bedrooms, two dressing-rooms, day nursery, with large oriel window, bath-room, linen room, &c., and above, good attics and lumber-rooms. The joiners' work, generally, is pitch-pine and red deal, with Vancouver pine in panels, all stained and varnished, very little paint being used internally. The mantelpieces are of walnut wood and various marbles combined, and every detail throughout the house has been specially designed by the architect. The style is Elizabethan. The materials are Hitchin red bricks, with dressings of a blue-grey vein of Bath stone and Broseley tiles. At the rear of the house is a range of stabling, and at the entrance a gate-lodge, all corresponding in style ... the architect, Mr T. C. Sorby, of Bedford-row, London.

== Selected works in Canada ==
After emigrating to Canada in 1883, Sorby designed numerous buildings in Vancouver, Victoria, and elsewhere in Canada until 1910.

=== Anglican Church, at the Huron Diocese, Ontario, 1859 ===
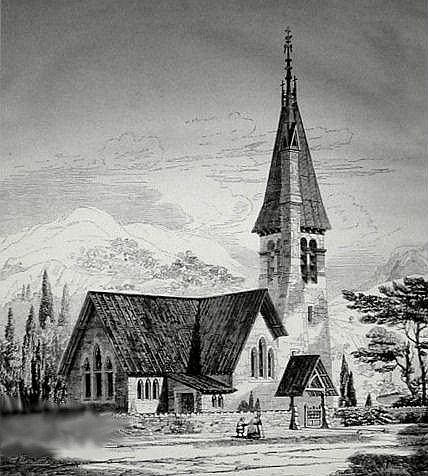
Anglican church, Huron, 1859

Sorby began designing for Canadian clients while still domiciled in the United Kingdom. He designed an Anglican church "on the banks of Lake Huron", possibly at Collingwood, in the Huron Anglican Diocese in 1859, early in his career. The church was for a "small and scattered congregation". Its north transept contained a lower room for the heating boilers and for tea-making, and an upper area for the small pipe organ. At the base of the tower was a small vestry. At the north-east corner of the tower was a "smole", or chimney for the boiler smoke, disguised as a turret. The height of the spire to the top of the weather vane was 76 ft (23.16 m).

=== Railway Station, Winnipeg, 1882–1883 ===
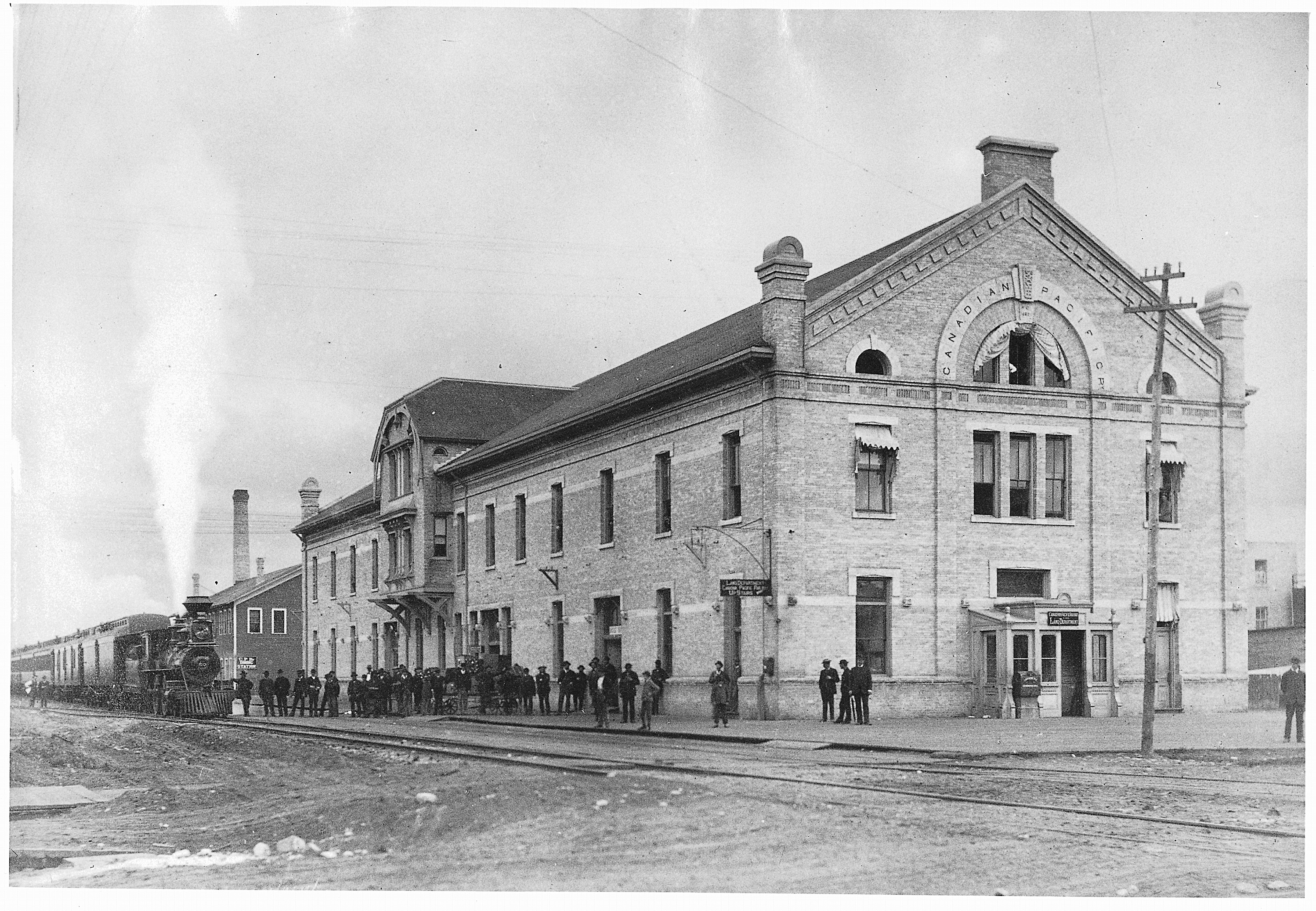
Rail station, Winnipeg, 1884

This was "one of the first major station structures to be constructed by the CPR", designed in brick on Main Street, Winnipeg, by Sorby, in 1882. It was on the track to Kicking Horse Valley, British Columbia. It was burned down in 1886, but was rebuilt on the remaining walls. That restoration was later demolished, to be replaced with the Royal Alexandra Hotel in 1906.

=== Mount Stephen House, Field, British Columbia, 1886 ===
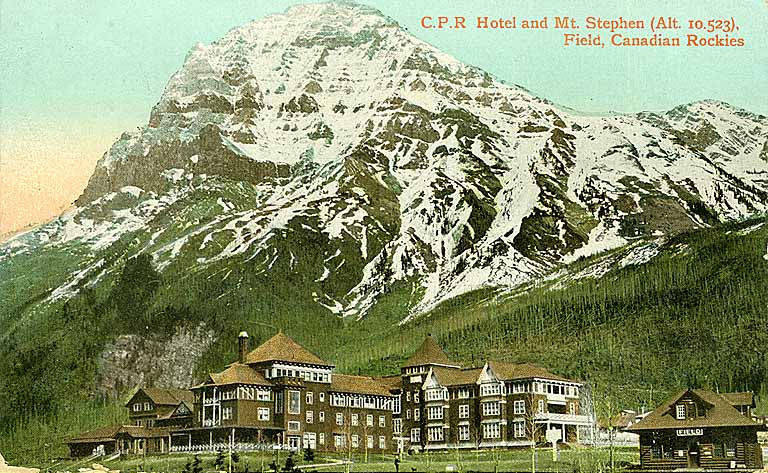
Mount Stephen House

Mount Stephen House, a hotel in Field, British Columbia, was designed by Sorby for the CPR, and opened in 1886. It was built in chalet style, "fifty miles west of Banff, Alberta, in Kicking Horse Canyon, at the base of Mount Stephen". It accommodated tourists including fishermen, climbers and artists. The hotel was reconstructed and extended with more guest rooms by architect Francis Rattenbury between 1901 and 1902. The hotel was closed in 1918, reopened as a YMCA, then demolished in 1963.

=== Glacier House, British Columbia, 1885–1887 ===
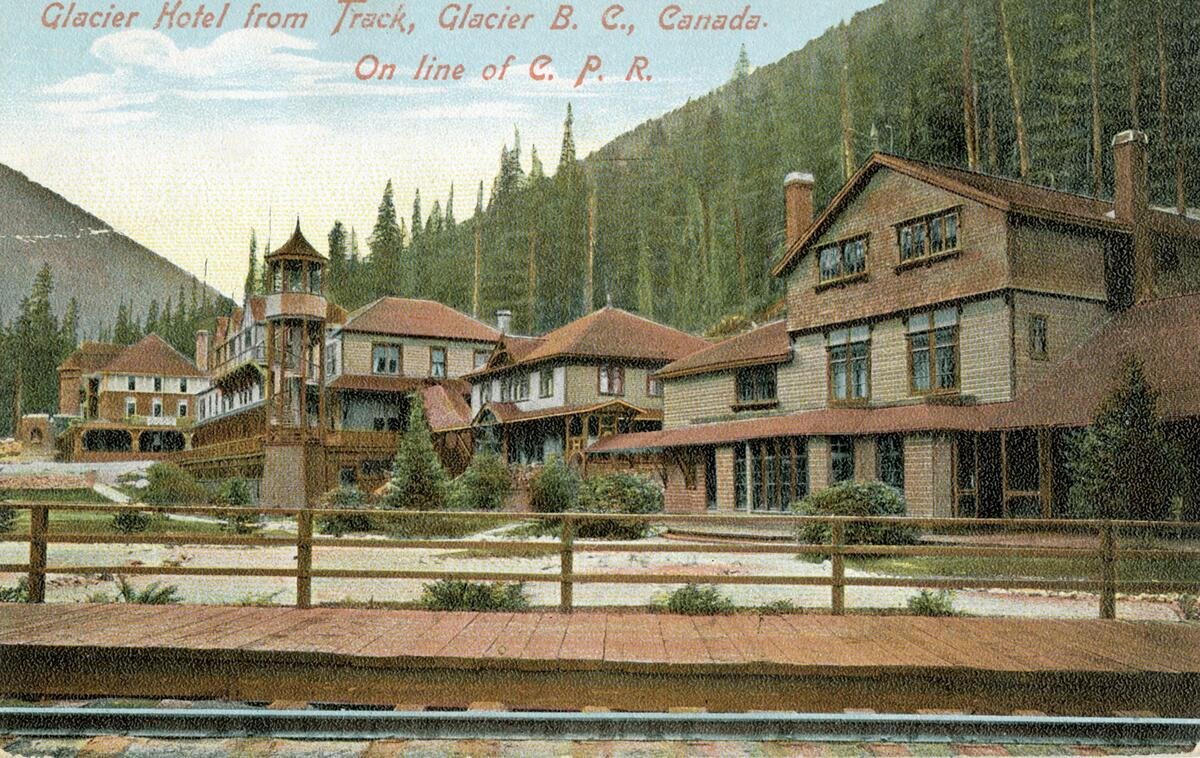
Glacier House

Glacier House, in the Selkirk Mountains in Glacier National Park, was designed by Sorby for the CPR in 1885 and opened in 1887 as a summer-season hotel. In the late 19th century, the hotel employed Swiss guides to assist the tourists in their mountain exploration. The hotel provided facilities for "climbing, glacier exploring, driving, riding, and hiking". The building was extended to accommodate more tourists in 1892 by architect Bruce Price, and again in 1904. It was closed in 1926, and demolished in 1929.

=== Fraser Canyon House, 1887 ===
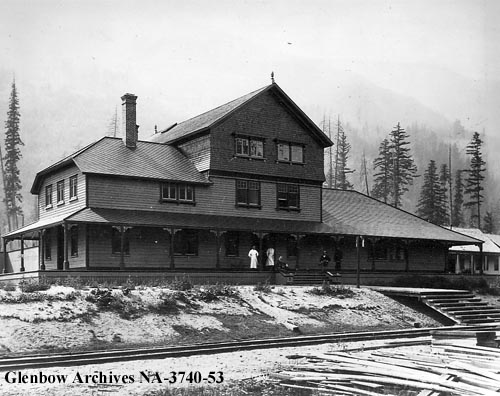
Fraser Canyon House

Fraser Canyon House, known as Fraser Canon House, Canyon House or North Bend Hotel, in North Bend, British Columbia, was designed in Swiss chalet style by Sorby for the CPR, and opened in 1887. It no longer exists,

=== Hotel Vancouver, 1886–1887 ===
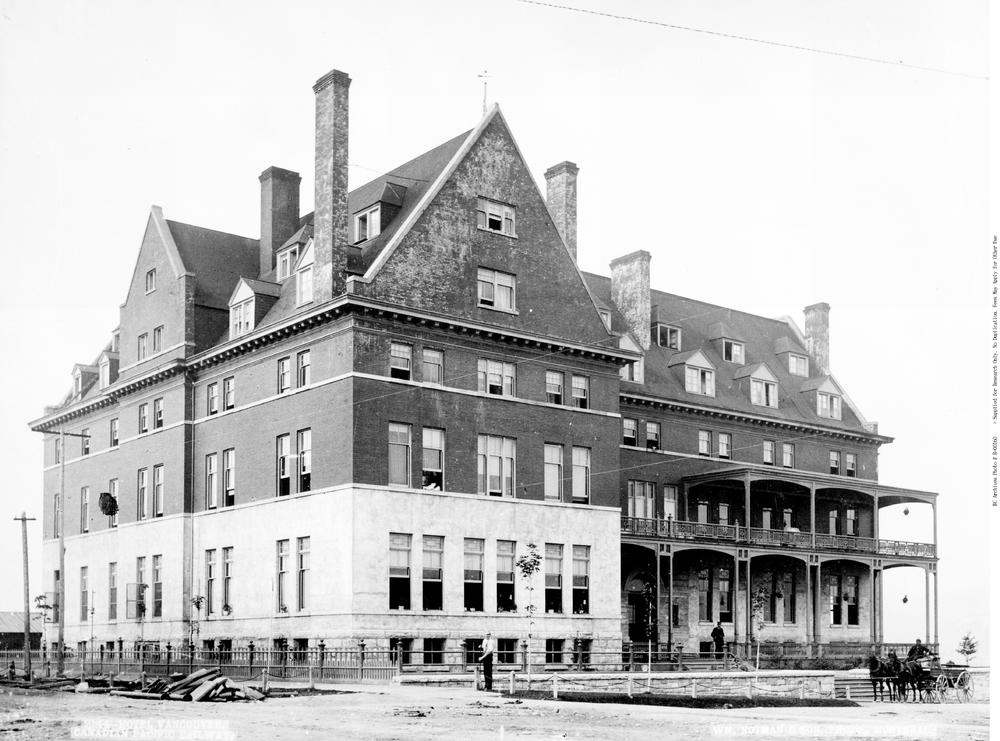
Hotel Vancouver, 1887

This was the first of three incarnations of the Hotel Vancouver. It was sited on Georgia Street and Granville street, Vancouver. It was designed by Sorby for the CPR and opened in 1887, two years after the railway reached the town. When built it was the town's largest hotel, having 60 guest rooms, and it was still "surrounded by forest on all sides". W.C. Van Horne of the CPR said to Sorby, "So you're the damn fool who spoilt the building with all those little windows". However the hotel was so successful that by 1916 its accommodation had to be expanded by the erection of an additional new hotel: the second Hotel Vancouver. Sorby's building was demolished in 1949.

=== Burrard Inlet rail terminal and offices, 1886–1888 ===
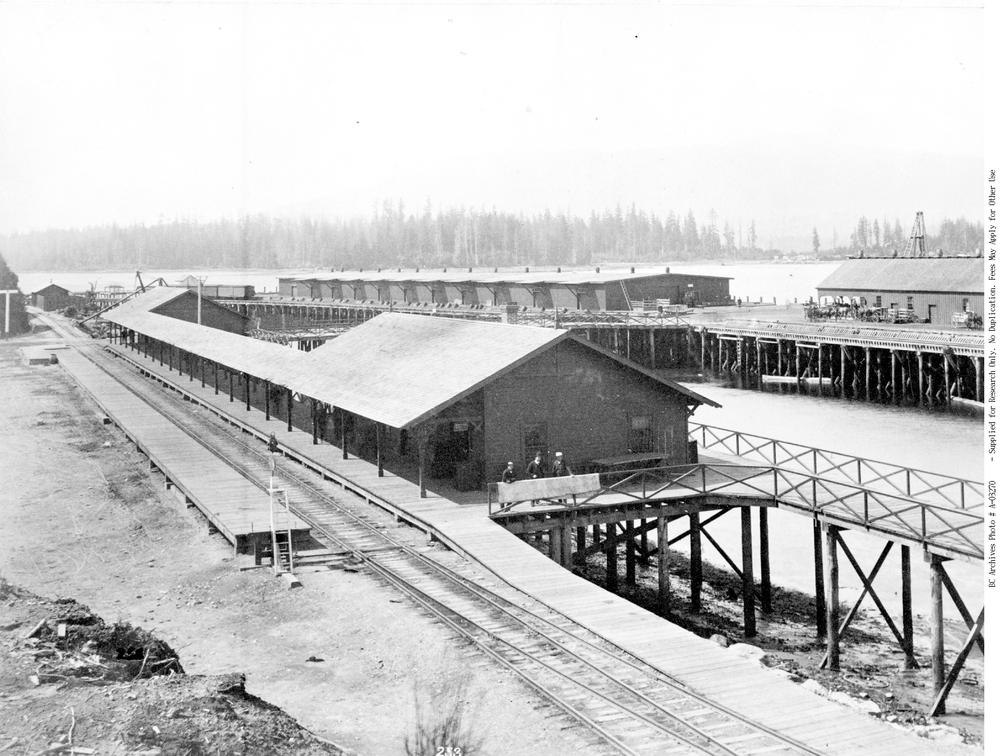
Burrard Inlet terminal and offices, 1890

Sorby designed Burrard Inlet's rail terminal, depot and offices between 1886 and 1888, for Harry Abbott of the CPR. This was the first set of rail terminal buildings in Vancouver. The office building was on Cordova Street, near Richards Street, Vancouver. However the traffic volume was too large for that small station, which was replaced in 1898 by a far larger building by the Maxwell brothers.

== Street improvement plans and propositions ==
=== Street improvements at Bristol, 1874 ===
In September 1874, Sorby submitted a £102,000 (equivalent to £9,972,369 in 2025) plan to Bristol Town Council for a street improvement to resolve the "difficult ascent of Park Street", which had been wearing out horses and causing delays. Although his idea was never used, the following description by Building News of the plan indicates something of Sorby's ambition as an engineer, his attention to detail and his ability to spend money:

[The plan] seems likely to pay ... for the cost of its execution. He proposes first, the formation of a through route from Bristol Bridge to the top of Park Street, about 750 yards (690 m) long, with a gradient of about 1 in 24 throughout its length, crossing the various streets by girder bridges. Parallel with this route Mr Sorby would form a second line of street at the normal level, replacing the lines destroyed. The roadway of the high level street would be carried on a series of vaults, and flights of stairs at intervals, giving access to the low-level street, would be provided. The Float would be terminated at New Quay instead of at Stone Bridge, as at present, the drawbridge removed, add the reclaimed land to building purposes. Secondly, Mr Sorby suggests the continuation of Broad-street westwards, reversing the present gradient so as to obtain a regular rise to Perry-road. The old gateway and church of St John would remain intact, and access to the gateway and thence to Quay-street would be maintained by a flight of steps. The surface of Park-row would have to be slightly altered to ensure a uniform fall from the top of Park-street to Perry-road, thus relieving the gradients of the whole route. St. John-street would be widened so as to bring Broadmead and the St James's district within the area benefited by the new road. No valuable property would be interfered with at any point dealt with by the last-proposed improvement, and the new sites provided would doubtless be rapidly and profitably utilised. The first improvement would provide a direct and independent route for the railway traffic and that of the districts south of Bristol Bridge; the second a direct and convenient line of road from the centre of the city to the north and west suburbs, which contain the bulk of the residences of the business community of Bristol. The principal merit of Mr. Sorby's plan is the separation, which its adoption would insure, of the two classes of vehicular traffic, favoured as it is by the configuration of the ground. The omnibus, hackney carriage and all the light fast traffic would naturally pass over the new high level-street, and the low-level would be left for the heavy, slow goods traffic, which is principally confined to the area contiguous to the Floating Harbour and the Railway Station.

== Competitions ==
=== Competitions in the U.K. ===
In London in April 1859, Sorby exhibited a design for a chapel at Hanley Cemetery, Staffordshire, described as "Gothic, with red brick". In the same exhibition was his entry of a design for "a new building in red brick" for Wakefield Church Institution (Church of England).

In 1863, Sorby's design for the Holborn Valley Improvements, London, was "premiated out of the 120 submitted". Ultimately, William Haywood, engineer and surveyor to the Commission of Sewers, cherry-picked elements from several of the shortlisted designs and took credit for the design of the works, now known as the Holborn Viaduct. In the same year, Sorby won first prize for his plan for laying out the Borrap Estate, Ripon. Again in 1863 he won first prize for his design for the Congregational Church, Ringwood.

In 1864, Sorby won a prize of £20 (equivalent to £2,197 in 2025) for his design of "a pair of semi-detached villas at Peterborough, capable of being erected for £800" (equivalent to £87,882 in 2025). The villas were "carried into execution forthwith" by the builders Rudch and Thompson of Peterborough. In 1864–1865 he came fourth, winning £30 (equivalent to £3,296 in 2025), in a competition for a design of the St. Pancras Station Hotel, London, for the London & Midland Railway Commissioners (George Gilbert Scott won that one).

In 1865, Sorby won a competition, against nearly fifty other entries, to design a pair of semi-detached villas in Balham, Surrey. In 1866, Sorby won second prize for his design of a corn exchange in Doncaster, England. In 1867, Sorby won second prize for his design of a South Eastern Railway development, in Folkstone, for the South Eastern Railway Commissioners.

In 1871, Sorby won the first prize of 50 guineas (equivalent to £5,347 in 2025), for a proposal to develop surplus land for the Metropolitan Railway company. This plan laid out the Praed Street Estate, London (on either side of, and behind, the present Paddington tube station of 1868) ...

... giving accommodation for small dwellings for [railway] operatives, and shops. On each side of the station, opposite the Great Western Hotel, he has placed two-room shops, treated as an arcade, to form a pretty feature, and to be occupied by tobacconists, newsagents, &c., &c. In a narrow space over the entrance to the tunnel he proposes, neat panels in the walls for permanent advertisements, which we hope he will also be able to render pretty features. Behind the station he places a block of model dwellings for 36 families, while a range of neat shops and stables behind occupy the vacant part of the frontage of Praed-street.

In the same year of 1871, Sorby was one of the group of winners of a design competition for a number of housing estates for the Metropolitan Railway, London. The estates were: "Linden Grove Estate, Campden Hill Estate, Praed Street Estate, Edgeware Road Estate, Clerkenwell Estate, King's Cross Estate, Barbican Estate, and the Smithfield Estate". Sorby also developed Clerkenwell Housing Estate.

In 1873, Sorby contributed a design for the Leicester Municipal Buildings. Although he did not win, he received a compliment in the judges' description of him as "Mr T. C. Sorby, to whom the town owes its charming Wigginton Hospital".

=== Competitions in Canada ===
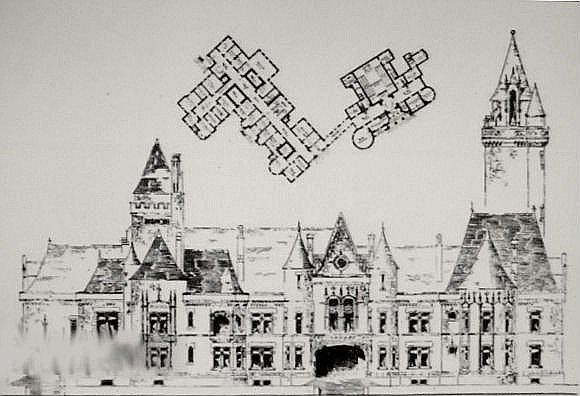
Design for government buildings, Victoria, 1893 (unbuilt)

In 1885, Sorby won first prize for his design of the Trafalgar Institute for Women, Cote des Neiges Road, Montreal. In 1893, his design for "a range of government buildings" in Victoria, British Columbia" won second prize.

== Inventions ==
=== Improved skylight, 1871 ===
This was an improved version of the skylight. It was called by Sorby a "sunlight", in whose invention he was partially involved. Sorby described it in the Building News as: "an improved sunlight, partially invented by [himself] ... similar to several to be seen in the London county and police courts ... and in all of the more recent county courts".

=== Conservative sash fastener, 1876 ===
In 1876, a new invention by Sorby was announced by Building News, and described thus:

Messrs Hobbs, Hart & Co. are now manufacturing a sash-fastener called the Conservative which is the invention of Mr. T.C. Sorby, and has several advantages. It is simple in construction, cannot easily be put out of order, and is self-acting. Moreover, it admits of leaving the windows open to a fixed limit day and night for ventilation, at the same time ensuring safety, and it can be applied to meeting rails at any height above the floor and worked from any convenient position. The movement can also be carried under, over, or through desks or other obstacles, so that double-hung sashes can be opened or closed with ease by use of suitable cords. The fastener consists of a spring latch, the bolt of which shoots into a rack with two or more notches, the upper ones for fixing the sashes open for ventilation, the lower one for securing the sashes when closed. The bolt is drawn back by a rod or cord passing down the face of the lower sash, finishing with a catch at any required height; this is released by a touch of the finger, and the act of closing the sashes secures them. (Note: A double-hung sash is a box sash window in which two glazed panels can be slid over each other)

== Exhibitions ==
At the International Exhibition of 1871, Sorby displayed drawings alongside thirty other architects and artists, including Edward Middleton Barry, Alfred Waterhouse, Matthew Digby Wyatt, John Hungerford Pollen and Horace Jones.

== Institutions ==
Sorby was elected a Fellow of the Royal Institute of British Architects (RIBA) on 2 May 1870. While in England he used to attend the RIBA's conversaziones, contributing historical artworks from his collection, as was the custom at those meetings.

== Publications ==
- Sorby, T. C. (20 June 1885). "Railway Station, Port Arthur, Ontario, Canada, for Canadian Pacific Railway". The Builder. 48: 863. "Article ... on wood balloon framing techniques of construction in Canada, with illustration"
- Sorby, Thomas C. (20 June 1885). "Railway Station, Eagle River, Ontario, Canada, for Canadian Pacific Railway". The Builder. 48: 863. "Description and exterior perspective drawing. Essay on wood balloon framing techniques of construction in Canada."

== Archives ==
Documents pertaining to Sorby are held by City of Victoria Archives. Those documents include "three scrapbooks of newspaper clippings and one architectural sketch ... of a proposed plan of the Parliament buildings of British Colombia".
