= Canadian federal election results in Toronto =

Seats obtained by party in Toronto

Liberal
Conservative
New Democratic
Progressive Conservative (defunct)
Reform (defunct)
Alliance (defunct)
Co-operative Commonwealth (defunct)
Independents

This page shows results of Canadian federal elections in the City of Toronto.

== Regional profile ==
Until 1962, most ridings in Toronto were Progressive Conservative strongholds, aside from splits with the Liberals in the 1949 and 1953 elections. Since 1962, Central Toronto, particularly Old Toronto, has generally leaned to the political left or centre-left. Most elections in the 1960s resulted in a small handful (most often two or three) of New Democratic Party (NDP) seats with the Liberals taking all or most of the rest. Toronto's outer ridings urbanized at this time and began to support the Liberals more.

Between 1972 and 1988, inclusive, the Tories usually split Toronto seats almost evenly with the Liberals (1972, 1979, 1984) or were reduced to about the same number of seats as the NDP (1974, 1980, 1988) with the Grits taking the lion's share.

In 1993, 1997, and 2000, the Grits held every seat in the former Metro Toronto, in some cases with large margins. The NDP broke through to win a seat in the 2004 election, when its new leader Jack Layton took Toronto–Danforth, and did slightly better in each of the next two elections, held in 2006 and 2008. The Conservative Party, whose predecessor parties had been completely shut out of Toronto since 1993, failed to win seats in the city in 2006 or 2008.

In 2011, the Liberal vote collapsed under the onslaught of both the Conservatives and the NDP, with the Conservatives taking eight Toronto seats including Liberal leader Michael Ignatieff's Etobicoke—Lakeshore riding. With its national surge in support, the NDP also won eight seats in Toronto. The region reverted to its post-1990 form in 2015, as a massive surge in Liberal support allowed the Liberals to sweep Toronto. However, growing discontent with Justin Trudeau's government led to the Conservatives winning a by-election in Toronto-St Paul's, with Don Stewart winning by less than 2%, making it the first time the Conservatives won a riding inside the 416 since 2011. The riding would be won by the Liberals in 2025.

In 2025, the Liberals continued to dominate in Toronto, but failed to win every riding as the Conservatives won York Centre.

=== Votes by party throughout time ===
Election	Liberal	Conservative	New Democratic	Green	People's	PC	Reform / Alliance	Others
1979	371,105; 38.9%	—N/a	199,303; 20.9%	—N/a	—N/a	374,133; 39.2%	—N/a	10,067; 1.1%
1980	409,962; 45.0%	—N/a	183,047; 20.1%	—N/a	—N/a	309,161; 33.9%	—N/a	8,660; 1.0%
1984	345,318; 35.0%	—N/a	199,809; 20.3%	4,499; 0.5%	—N/a	424,752; 43.1%	—N/a	11,706; 1.2%
1988	422,461; 42.0%	—N/a	191,050; 19.0%	2,711; 0.3%	—N/a	372,243; 37.0%	—N/a	17,614; 1.8%
1993	559,017; 57.6%	—N/a	65,523; 6.8%	3,916; 0.4%	—N/a	156,801; 16.2%	149,369; 15.4%	35,667; 3.7%
1997	509,354; 56.0%	—N/a	118,730; 13.0%	5,841; 0.6%	—N/a	149,652; 16.3%	105,118; 11.5%	27,466; 3.0%
2000	515,972; 60.3%	—N/a	91,178; 10.7%	6,015; 0.7%	—N/a	104,840; 12.3%	115,928; 13.6%	21,346; 2.5%
2004	520,390; 52.0%	186,700; 19.7%	189,364; 20.0%	36,310; 3.8%	—N/a	—N/a	—N/a	12,617; 1.3%
2006	536,935; 51.1%	246,210; 23.4%	220,503; 21.0%	43,954; 4.2%	—N/a	—N/a	—N/a	3,885; 0.4%
2008	437,750; 46.6%	244,732; 26.0%	183,299; 19.5%	70,257; 7.5%	—N/a	—N/a	—N/a	3,851; 0.4%
2011	349,162; 34.8%	311,522; 31.0%	307,661; 30.6%	31,911; 3.2%	—N/a	—N/a	—N/a	4,012; 0.4%
2015	644,768; 52.4%	321,381; 26.1%	230,378; 18.7%	28,033; 2.3%	—N/a	—N/a	—N/a	6,821; 0.6%
2019	690,001; 54.1%	294,145; 23.1%	210,138; 16.5%	60,110; 4.7%	14,959; 1.2%	—N/a	—N/a	4,963; 0.4%
2021	579,490; 51.9%	262,736; 23.5%	210,138; 18.8%	23,329; 2.1%	37,412; 3.4%	—N/a	—N/a	2,800; 0.3%
2025	760,078; 58.2%	440,196; 33.7%	83,111; 6.4%	10,493; 0.8%	4,652; 0.4%	—N/a	—N/a	7,410; 0.6%

== Detailed results ==
=== 2025 ===
Electoral district	Candidates					Incumbent
Electoral district	Liberal	Conservative	NDP	Green	Other	Incumbent
Scarborough—Agincourt	Jean Yip; 27,552; 54.3%	Aris Movsessian; 21,732; 42.8%	Dan Lovell; 1,449; 2.9%			Jean Yip
Scarborough Centre—Don Valley East	Salma Zahid; 27,557; 57.3%	Belent Mathew; 18,307; 38.1%	Alyson Koa; 1,565; 3.3%		Peter Koubakis (PPC); 659; 1.4%	Michael Coteau‡ Don Valley East {(Running in Scarborough—Woburn)
Scarborough Centre—Don Valley East	Salma Zahid; 27,557; 57.3%	Belent Mathew; 18,307; 38.1%	Alyson Koa; 1,565; 3.3%		Peter Koubakis (PPC); 659; 1.4%	Merged District
Scarborough Centre—Don Valley East	Salma Zahid; 27,557; 57.3%	Belent Mathew; 18,307; 38.1%	Alyson Koa; 1,565; 3.3%		Peter Koubakis (PPC); 659; 1.4%	Salma Zahid; Scarborough Centre
Scarborough—Guildwood—Rouge Park	Gary Anandasangaree; 35,295; 64.0%	Suchita Jalan; 17,485; 31.7%	Kingsley Kwok; 1,772; 3.2%	Troy Rife; 633; 1.1%		Gary Anandasangaree; Scarborough—Rouge Park
Scarborough North	Shaun Chen; 29,418; 63.0%	Gurmit Sandhu; 15,487; 33.1%	Karishma Manji; 1,827; 3.9%			Shaun Chen
Scarborough Southwest	Bill Blair; 33,495; 61.5%	Asm Tarun; 16,652; 30.6%	Fatima Shaban; 2,730; 5.0%	Amanda Cain; 754; 1.4%	Imran Khan (Cent.); 165 0.3%	Bill Blair
Scarborough Southwest	Bill Blair; 33,495; 61.5%	Asm Tarun; 16,652; 30.6%	Fatima Shaban; 2,730; 5.0%	Amanda Cain; 754; 1.4%	Christine Nugent (M-L); 113 0.2%	Bill Blair
Scarborough Southwest	Bill Blair; 33,495; 61.5%	Asm Tarun; 16,652; 30.6%	Fatima Shaban; 2,730; 5.0%	Amanda Cain; 754; 1.4%	Michael Poulin (PPC); 567 1.0%	Bill Blair
Scarborough—Woburn	Michael Coteau; 25,281; 60.4%	Reddy Muttukuru; 14,291; 34.1%	George Wedge; 1,466; 3.5%	Gianne Broughton; 499; 1.2%	Amina Bhaiyat (Ind.); 181 0.4%	John McKay†; Scarborough—Guildwood
Scarborough—Woburn	Michael Coteau; 25,281; 60.4%	Reddy Muttukuru; 14,291; 34.1%	George Wedge; 1,466; 3.5%	Gianne Broughton; 499; 1.2%	Ayub Sipra (Cent.); 150 0.4%	John McKay†; Scarborough—Guildwood

Electoral district	Candidates					Incumbent
Electoral district	Liberal	Conservative	NDP	Green	Other	Incumbent
Don Valley North	Maggie Chi; 25,822; 53.2%	Joe Tay; 20,546; 42.3%	Naila Saeed; 1,191; 2.5%	Andrew Armstrong; 448; 0.9%	Xiaohua Gong (NA); 260 0.5%	Han Dong†
Don Valley North	Maggie Chi; 25,822; 53.2%	Joe Tay; 20,546; 42.3%	Naila Saeed; 1,191; 2.5%	Andrew Armstrong; 448; 0.9%	Ivan Milivojevic (PPC); 260 0.5%	Han Dong†
Don Valley West	Rob Oliphant; 36,744; 62.6%	Robert Pierce; 19,480; 33.2%	Linnea Löfström-Abary; 1,382; 2.4%	Sheena Sharp; 616; 1.1%	Bahira Abdulsalam (Ind.); 442; 0.8%	Rob Oliphant
Eglinton—Lawrence	Vince Gasparro; 29,949; 49.3%	Karen Stintz; 29,061; 47.8%	Allison Tanzola; 996; 1.6%	Wayne Chechuevskiy; 429; 0.7%	Timothy Gleeson (PPC); 326; 0.5%	Vacant (Note: There was no byelection because the riding became vacant within nine months of the scheduled date of a general election.)
Willowdale	Ali Ehsassi; 25,488; 53.4%	James Lin; 20,977; 44.0%	Christy Kheirallah; 1,224; 2.6%			Ali Ehsassi
York Centre	Ya'ara Saks; 20,318; 42.7%	Roman Baber; 26,110; 54.8%	Yusuf Ulukanligil; 1,191; 2.5%			Ya'ara Saks

Electoral district	Candidates							Incumbent
Electoral district	Liberal	Conservative	NDP	Green	Marxist-Leninist	Communist	Other	Incumbent
Beaches—East York	Nate Erskine-Smith; 39,804; 67.7%	Jocelyne Poirier; 13,830; 23.5%	Shannon Devine; 4,027; 6.9%	Jack Pennings; 748; 1.3%	Steve Rutchinski; 39; 0.1%	Elizabeth Rowley; 146; 0.2%	Diane Joseph (Ind.); 161; 0.3%	Nathaniel Erskine-Smith^{¢}
Davenport	Julie Dzerowicz; 35,364; 57.8%	Francis Lavoie; 14,189; 23.2%	Sandra Sousa; 10,452; 17.1%	Lilian Barrera; 782; 1.3%		Dave McKee; 387; 0.6%		Julie Dzerowicz
Spadina—Harbourfront	Chi Nguyen; 31,832; 60.1%	Diana Filipova; 16,286; 30.7%	Norm Di Pasquale; 4,107; 7.8%	Gordon Rand; 448; 0.8%	Nick Lin; 85; 0.2%		Gilbert Joseph Jubinville (PPC); 193 0.4%	Kevin Vuong†; Spadina—Fort York
Spadina—Harbourfront	Chi Nguyen; 31,832; 60.1%	Diana Filipova; 16,286; 30.7%	Norm Di Pasquale; 4,107; 7.8%	Gordon Rand; 448; 0.8%	Nick Lin; 85; 0.2%		Shrey Rao (Ind.); 39 0.1%	Kevin Vuong†; Spadina—Fort York
Taiaiako'n—Parkdale—High Park	Karim Bardeesy; 36,439; 55.8%	Wladyslaw Lizon; 12,662; 19.4%	Bhutila Karpoche; 15,003; 23.0%	Anna Gorka; 700; 1.1%	Lorne Gershuny; 92; 0.1%	Rimmy Riarh; 137; 0.2%	Edward Fraser (APP); 184 0.3%	Arif Virani^{$} Parkdale—High Park
Taiaiako'n—Parkdale—High Park	Karim Bardeesy; 36,439; 55.8%	Wladyslaw Lizon; 12,662; 19.4%	Bhutila Karpoche; 15,003; 23.0%	Anna Gorka; 700; 1.1%	Lorne Gershuny; 92; 0.1%	Rimmy Riarh; 137; 0.2%	Terry Parker (Mar.); 96 0.1%	Arif Virani^{$} Parkdale—High Park
Toronto Centre	Evan Solomon; 37,907; 64.3%	Luis Ibarra; 12,321; 20.9%	Samantha Green; 7,358; 12.5%	Olivia Iheme; 664; 1.1%	Philip Fernandez; 170; 0.3%		Simon Luisi (APP); 177 0.3%	Marci Ien^{$}
Toronto Centre	Evan Solomon; 37,907; 64.3%	Luis Ibarra; 12,321; 20.9%	Samantha Green; 7,358; 12.5%	Olivia Iheme; 664; 1.1%	Philip Fernandez; 170; 0.3%		Cleveland Marshall (Ind.); 90 0.2%	Marci Ien^{$}
Toronto Centre	Evan Solomon; 37,907; 64.3%	Luis Ibarra; 12,321; 20.9%	Samantha Green; 7,358; 12.5%	Olivia Iheme; 664; 1.1%	Philip Fernandez; 170; 0.3%		Nathen Mazri (PPC); 235 0.4%	Marci Ien^{$}
Toronto—Danforth	Julie Dabrusin; 39,191; 66.6%	Ashik Hussain; 11,187; 19.0%	Clare Hacksel; 7,626; 13.0%	Silvia Stardust; 626; 1.1%			Liz White (APP); 251; 0.4%	Julie Dabrusin
Toronto—St. Paul's	Leslie Church; 44,313; 61.9%	Don Stewart; 23,700; 33.1%	Bruce Levy; 2,496; 3.5%	Shane Philips; 552; 0.8%	David Gershuny; 133; 0.2%		Joseph Frasca (PPC); 329 0.5%	Don Stewart
Toronto—St. Paul's	Leslie Church; 44,313; 61.9%	Don Stewart; 23,700; 33.1%	Bruce Levy; 2,496; 3.5%	Shane Philips; 552; 0.8%	David Gershuny; 133; 0.2%		Cynthia Valdron (CFP); 58 0.1%	Don Stewart
University—Rosedale	Chrystia Freeland; 39,847; 64.0%	Liz Grade; 14,624; 23.5%	Serena Purdy; 6,168; 9.9%	Ignacio Mongrell; 1,066; 1.7%	Barbara Biley; 138; 0.2%	Drew Garvie; 304; 0.5%	Adam Golding (Ind.); 118; 0.2%	Chrystia Freeland

Electoral district	Candidates						Incumbent
Electoral district	Liberal	Conservative	NDP	Green	PPC	Other	Incumbent
Etobicoke Centre	Yvan Baker; 36,186; 53.6%	Ted Opitz; 29,713; 44.0%	Ji Won Jung; 1,611; 2.4%				Yvan Baker
Etobicoke—Lakeshore	James Maloney; 37,512; 57.4%	Bernard Trottier; 25,348; 38.8%	Cory Wagar; 1,665; 2.5%		Thomas Fanjoy; 616; 0.9%	Janice Murray (M-L); 197; 0.3%	James Maloney
Etobicoke North	John Zerucelli; 22,270; 52.6%	Natalie Weed; 17,359; 41.0%	Benjamin Abis; 1,354; 3.2%	Sarun Balaranjan; 394; 0.9%	Andy D'Andrea; 846; 2.0%	Neil Simon (Ind.); 132; 0.3%	Kirsty Duncan^{$}
Humber River—Black Creek	Judy Sgro; 21,357; 55.6%	Bijay Paudel; 13,745; 35.8%	Matias de Dovitiis; 2,449; 6.4%		Marek Jasinski; 621; 1.6%	Jeanne McGuire (Comm.); 226; 0.6%	Judy Sgro
York South—Weston—Etobicoke	Ahmed Hussen; 24,663; 55.3%	Nicolas Pham; 17,746; 39.8%	Louise James; 2,190; 4.9%				Ahmed Hussen; York South—Weston

=== 2021 ===
Electoral district	Candidates						Incumbent
Electoral district	Liberal	Conservative	NDP	Green	PPC	Other	Incumbent
Beaches—East York	Nathaniel Erskine-Smith; 28,919; 56.58%	Lisa Robinson; 7,336; 14.35%	Alejandra Ruiz Vargas; 11,513; 22.52%	Reuben Anthony DeBoer; 1,388; 2.72%	Radu Rautescu; 1,613; 3.16%	Philip Fernandez (M-L); 50 0.10%	Nathaniel Erskine-Smith
Beaches—East York	Nathaniel Erskine-Smith; 28,919; 56.58%	Lisa Robinson; 7,336; 14.35%	Alejandra Ruiz Vargas; 11,513; 22.52%	Reuben Anthony DeBoer; 1,388; 2.72%	Radu Rautescu; 1,613; 3.16%	Jennifer Moxon (Comm.); 131 0.26%	Nathaniel Erskine-Smith
Beaches—East York	Nathaniel Erskine-Smith; 28,919; 56.58%	Lisa Robinson; 7,336; 14.35%	Alejandra Ruiz Vargas; 11,513; 22.52%	Reuben Anthony DeBoer; 1,388; 2.72%	Radu Rautescu; 1,613; 3.16%	Karen Lee Wilde (Ind.); 166 0.32%	Nathaniel Erskine-Smith
Davenport (judicial recount terminated)	Julie Dzerowicz; 19,930; 42.13%	Jenny Kalimbet; 4,774; 10.09%	Alejandra Bravo; 19,854; 41.97%	Adrian Currie; 1,087; 2.30%	Tara Dos Remedios; 1,499; 3.17%	Chai Kalevar (Ind.); 77 0.16%	Julie Dzerowicz
Davenport (judicial recount terminated)	Julie Dzerowicz; 19,930; 42.13%	Jenny Kalimbet; 4,774; 10.09%	Alejandra Bravo; 19,854; 41.97%	Adrian Currie; 1,087; 2.30%	Tara Dos Remedios; 1,499; 3.17%	Troy Young (Ind.); 86 0.18%	Julie Dzerowicz
Don Valley West	Rob Oliphant; 24,798; 52.75%	Yvonne Robertson; 16,695; 35.51%	Syeda Riaz; 3,814; 8.11%	Elvira Caputolan; 761; 1.62%	Michael Minas; 881; 1.87%	Adil Khan (Cent.); 65; 0.14%	Rob Oliphant
Eglinton—Lawrence	Marco Mendicino; 24,051; 48.48%	Geoff Pollock; 18,082; 36.45%	Caleb Senneker; 4,543; 9.16%	Eric Frydman; 1,490; 3.00%	Timothy Gleeson; 1,445; 2.91%		Marco Mendicino
Parkdale—High Park	Arif Virani; 22,307; 42.45%	Nestor Sanajko; 6,815; 12.97%	Paul Taylor; 20,602; 39.21%	Diem Marchand-Lafortune; 957; 1.82%	Wilfried Richard Alexander Danzinger; 1,642; 3.13%	Lorne Gershuny (M-L); 90 0.17%	Arif Virani
Parkdale—High Park	Arif Virani; 22,307; 42.45%	Nestor Sanajko; 6,815; 12.97%	Paul Taylor; 20,602; 39.21%	Diem Marchand-Lafortune; 957; 1.82%	Wilfried Richard Alexander Danzinger; 1,642; 3.13%	Terry Parker (Mar.); 130 0.25%	Arif Virani
Spadina—Fort York	Kevin Vuong (Note: Vuong has announced he will sit as an independent when parliament convenes. Because he was on the ballot as a Liberal, he's still treated as a Liberal here.); 18,991; 38.90%	Sukhi Jandu; 9,875; 20.23%	Norm Di Pasquale; 16,834; 34.48%	Amanda Rosenstock; 1,645; 3.37%	Ian Roden; 1,476; 3.02%		Adam Vaughan$
Toronto Centre	Marci Ien; 23,071; 50.35%	Ryan Lester; 5,571; 12.16%	Brian Chang; 11,909; 25.99%	Annamie Paul; 3,921; 8.56%	Syed Jaffery; 1,047; 2.29%	Ivan Byard (Comm.); 181 0.40%	Marci Ien
Toronto Centre	Marci Ien; 23,071; 50.35%	Ryan Lester; 5,571; 12.16%	Brian Chang; 11,909; 25.99%	Annamie Paul; 3,921; 8.56%	Syed Jaffery; 1,047; 2.29%	Peter Stubbins (Animal); 117 0.26%	Marci Ien
Toronto—Danforth	Julie Dabrusin; 25,214; 48.36%	Michael Carey; 6,547; 12.56%	Clare Hacksel; 17,555; 33.67%	Maryem Tollar; 1,023; 1.96%	Wayne Simmons; 1,282; 2.46%	Habiba Desai (Ind.); 123 0.24%	Julie Dabrusin
Toronto—Danforth	Julie Dabrusin; 25,214; 48.36%	Michael Carey; 6,547; 12.56%	Clare Hacksel; 17,555; 33.67%	Maryem Tollar; 1,023; 1.96%	Wayne Simmons; 1,282; 2.46%	Elizabeth Rowley (Comm.); 215 0.41%	Julie Dabrusin
Toronto—Danforth	Julie Dabrusin; 25,214; 48.36%	Michael Carey; 6,547; 12.56%	Clare Hacksel; 17,555; 33.67%	Maryem Tollar; 1,023; 1.96%	Wayne Simmons; 1,282; 2.46%	Liz White (Animal); 183 0.35%	Julie Dabrusin
Toronto—St. Paul's	Carolyn Bennett; 26,429; 49.22%	Stephanie Osadchuk; 13,587; 25.30%	Sidney Coles; 9,036; 16.83%	Phil De Luna; 3,214; 5.99%	Peter Remedios; 1,432; 2.67%		Carolyn Bennett
University—Rosedale	Chrystia Freeland; 22,451; 47.53%	Steven Taylor; 9,473; 20.06%	Nicole Robicheau; 11,921; 25.24%	Tim Grant; 1,974; 4.18%	David Kent; 1,172; 2.48%	Drew Garvie (Comm.); 244; 0.52%	Chrystia Freeland
York South—Weston	Ahmed Hussen; 21,644; 56.12%	Sajanth Mohan; 7,783; 20.18%	Hawa Mire; 6,517; 16.90%	Nicki Ward; 872; 2.26%	Sitara Chiu; 1,754; 4.55%		Ahmed Hussen

Electoral district	Candidates					Incumbent
Electoral district	Liberal	Conservative	NDP	PPC	Other	Incumbent
Don Valley East	Michael Coteau; 22,356; 59.90%	Penelope Williams; 8,766; 23.49%	Simon Topp; 4,618; 12.37%	Peter De Marco; 1,585; 4.25%		Yasmin Ratansi†
Don Valley North	Han Dong; 22,067; 54.44%	Sabrina Zuniga; 12,098; 29.85%	Bruce Griffin; 4,304; 10.62%	Jay Sobel; 1,301; 3.21%	Natalie Telfer (Green); 765; 1.89%	Han Dong
Etobicoke Centre	Yvan Baker; 27,635; 48.02%	Geoffrey Turner; 20,108; 34.94%	Ashley Da silva 5,804; 10.09%	Maurice Cormier; 4,003; 6.96%		Yvan Baker
Etobicoke—Lakeshore	James Maloney; 30,355; 47.38%	Indira Bains; 20,457; 31.93%	Sasha Kane; 8,775; 13.70%	Bill McLachlan; 2,857; 4.46%	Sean Carson (Rhino.); 119 0.19%	James Maloney
Etobicoke—Lakeshore	James Maloney; 30,355; 47.38%	Indira Bains; 20,457; 31.93%	Sasha Kane; 8,775; 13.70%	Bill McLachlan; 2,857; 4.46%	Anna Di Carlo (M-L); 139 0.22%	James Maloney
Etobicoke—Lakeshore	James Maloney; 30,355; 47.38%	Indira Bains; 20,457; 31.93%	Sasha Kane; 8,775; 13.70%	Bill McLachlan; 2,857; 4.46%	Afam Elue (Green); 1,363 2.13%	James Maloney
Etobicoke North	Kirsty Duncan; 21,201; 59.61%	Priti Lamba; 8,866; 24.93%	Cecil Peter; 3,708; 10.43%	Jim Boutsikakis; 1,473; 4.14%	Carol Royer (Ind.); 316; 0.89%	Kirsty Duncan
Humber River—Black Creek	Judy Sgro; 19,533; 60.69%	Rinku Shah; 5,599; 17.40%	Matias de Dovitiis; 5,279; 16.40%	Raatib Anderson; 1,258; 3.91%	Christine Nugent (M-L); 130 0.40%	Judy Sgro
Humber River—Black Creek	Judy Sgro; 19,533; 60.69%	Rinku Shah; 5,599; 17.40%	Matias de Dovitiis; 5,279; 16.40%	Raatib Anderson; 1,258; 3.91%	Unblind Tibbin (Green); 388 1.21%	Judy Sgro
Scarborough—Agincourt	Jean Yip; 20,712; 56.54%	Mark Johnson; 10,630; 29.02%	Larisa Julius; 3,679; 10.04%	Eric Muraven; 978; 2.67%	Arjun Balasingham (Green); 631; 1.72%	Jean Yip
Scarborough Centre	Salma Zahid; 23,128; 57.59%	Malcolm Ponnayan; 9,819; 24.45%	Faiz Kamal; 5,479; 13.64%	Petru Rozoveanu; 1,472; 3.67%	Aylwin T Mathew (NCA); 263; 0.65%	Salma Zahid
Scarborough-Guildwood	John McKay; 22,944; 61.10%	Carmen Wilson; 7,998; 21.30%	Michelle Spencer; 5,091; 13.56%	James Bountrogiannis; 1,096; 2.92%	Kevin Clarke (Ind.); 155 0.41%	John McKay
Scarborough-Guildwood	John McKay; 22,944; 61.10%	Carmen Wilson; 7,998; 21.30%	Michelle Spencer; 5,091; 13.56%	James Bountrogiannis; 1,096; 2.92%	Opa Day (Ind.); 85 0.23%	John McKay
Scarborough-Guildwood	John McKay; 22,944; 61.10%	Carmen Wilson; 7,998; 21.30%	Michelle Spencer; 5,091; 13.56%	James Bountrogiannis; 1,096; 2.92%	Aslam Khan (Cent.); 129 0.34%	John McKay
Scarborough-Guildwood	John McKay; 22,944; 61.10%	Carmen Wilson; 7,998; 21.30%	Michelle Spencer; 5,091; 13.56%	James Bountrogiannis; 1,096; 2.92%	Gus Stefanis (CNP); 52 0.14%	John McKay
Scarborough North	Shaun Chen; 21,178; 66.57%	Fazal Shah; 5,999; 18.86%	Christina Love; 3,514; 11.05%	David Moore; 763; 2.40%	Sheraz Khan (Cent.); 361; 1.13%	Shaun Chen
Scarborough—Rouge Park	Gary Anandasangaree; 28,702; 62.78%	Zia Choudhary; 9,628; 21.06%	Kingsley Kwok; 6,068; 13.27%	Asad Rehman; 1,322; 2.89%		Gary Anandasangaree
Scarborough Southwest	Bill Blair; 24,823; 57.50%	Mohsin Bhuiyan; 8,981; 20.80%	Guled Arale; 6,924; 16.04%	Ramona Pache; 1,259; 2.92%	Amanda Cain (Green); 1,068 2.47%	Bill Blair
Scarborough Southwest	Bill Blair; 24,823; 57.50%	Mohsin Bhuiyan; 8,981; 20.80%	Guled Arale; 6,924; 16.04%	Ramona Pache; 1,259; 2.92%	David Edward-Ooi Poon (Ind.); 117 0.27%	Bill Blair
Willowdale	Ali Ehsassi; 21,043; 51.19%	Daniel Lee; 13,916; 33.86%	Hal Berman; 4,231; 10.29%	Al Wahab; 1,102; 2.68%	Anna Gorka (Green); 812; 1.98%	Ali Ehsassi
York Centre	Ya'ara Saks; 17,430; 47.29%	Joel Yakov Etienne; 13,949; 37.85%	Kemal Ahmed; 3,753; 10.18%	Nixon Nguyen; 1,726; 4.68%		Ya'ara Saks

=== 2019 ===
Parties	1st	2nd	3rd	4th
Liberal	25	0	0	0
Conservative	0	17	8	0
New Democratic	0	8	17	0
Green	0	0	0	24

Electoral district	Candidates						Incumbent
Electoral district	Liberal	Conservative	NDP	Green	PPC	Other	Incumbent
Beaches—East York	Nathaniel Erskine-Smith; 32,647; 57.20%	Nadirah Nazeer; 8,026; 14.06%	Mae J. Nam; 12,196; 21.37%	Sean Manners; 3,378; 5.92%	Deborah McKenzie; 831; 1.46%		Nathaniel Erskine-Smith
Davenport	Julie Dzerowicz; 23,251; 43.72%	Sanjay Bhatia; 4,921; 9.25%	Andrew Cash; 21,812; 41.02%	Hannah Conover-Arthurs; 2,397; 4.51%	Francesco Ciardullo; 496; 0.93%	Chai Kalevar (Ind.); 79; 0.15% Elizabeth Rowley (Comm.); 138; 0.26% Troy Young (Ind.); 86; 0.16%	Julie Dzerowicz
Don Valley West	Rob Oliphant; 29,148; 55.80%	Yvonne Robertson; 16,304; 31.21%	Laurel MacDowell; 3,804; 7.28%	Amanda Kistindey; 2,257; 4.32%	Ian Prittie; 444; 0.85%	John Kittredge (Libert.); 277; 0.53%	Rob Oliphant
Eglinton—Lawrence	Marco Mendicino; 29,850; 53.30%	Chani Aryeh-Bain; 18,549; 33.12%	Alexandra Nash; 4,741; 8.47%	Reuben DeBoer; 2,278; 4.07%	Michael Staffieri; 586; 1.05%		Marco Mendicino
Parkdale—High Park	Arif Virani; 28,852; 47.39%	Adam Pham; 8,015; 13.16%	Paul M. Taylor; 19,180; 31.50%	Nick Capra; 3,916; 6.43%	Greg Wycliffe; 643; 1.06%	Lorne Gershuny (M-L); 43; 0.07% Alykhan Pabani (Comm.); 119; 0.20% Terry Parker (Mar.); 119; 0.20%	Arif Virani
Spadina—Fort York	Adam Vaughan; 33,822; 55.77%	Frank Fang; 10,680; 17.61%	Diana Yoon; 12,188; 20.10%	Dean Maher; 3,174; 5.23%	Robert Stewart; 672; 1.11%	Marcela Ramirez (Ind.); 114; 0.19%	Adam Vaughan
Toronto Centre	Bill Morneau; 31,271; 57.37%	Ryan Lester; 6,613; 12.13%	Brian Chang; 12,142; 22.27%	Annamie Paul; 3,852; 7.07%		Sean Carson (Rhino.); 147; 0.27% Bronwyn Cragg (Comm.); 125; 0.23% Philip Fernandez (M-L); 54; 0.10% Rob Lewin (Animal); 182; 0.33% Jason Tavares (Ind.); 126; 0.23%	Bill Morneau
Toronto—Danforth	Julie Dabrusin; 27,681; 47.68%	Zia Choudhary; 6,091; 10.49%	Min Sook Lee; 19,283; 33.21%	Chris Tolley; 3,761; 6.48%	Tara Dos Remedios; 621; 1.07%	Elizabeth Abbott (Animal); 261; 0.45% Ivan Byard (Comm.); 151; 0.26% John Kladitis (Ind.); 210; 0.36%	Julie Dabrusin
Toronto—St. Paul's	Carolyn Bennett; 32,494; 54.31%	Jae Truesdell; 12,933; 21.61%	Alok Mukherjee; 9,442; 15.78%	Sarah Climenhaga; 4,042; 6.76%	John Kellen; 923; 1.54%		Carolyn Bennett
University—Rosedale	Chrystia Freeland; 29,652; 51.67%	Helen-Claire Tingling; 9,342; 16.28%	Melissa Jean-Baptiste Vajda; 12,573; 21.91%	Tim Grant; 4,861; 8.47%	Aran Lockwood; 510; 0.89%	Karin Brothers (SCC); 124; 0.22% Drew Garvie (Comm.); 143; 0.25% Steve Rutschinski (M-L); 27; 0.05% Liz White (Animal); 159; 0.28%	Chrystia Freeland
York South—Weston	Ahmed Hussen; 25,976; 58.42%	Jasveen Rattan; 8,415; 18.93%	Yafet Tewelde; 7,754; 17.44%	Nicki Ward; 1,633; 3.67%	Gerard Racine; 685; 1.54%		Ahmed Hussen

Electoral district	Candidates						Incumbent
Electoral district	Liberal	Conservative	NDP	Green	PPC	Other	Incumbent
Don Valley East	Yasmin Ratansi; 25,295; 59.81%	Michael Ma; 10,115; 23.92%	Nicholas Thompson; 4,647; 10.99%	Dan Turcotte; 1,675; 3.96%	John P. Hendry; 562; 1.33%		Yasmin Ratansi
Don Valley North	Han Dong; 23,495; 50.45%	Sarah Fischer; 16,506; 35.44%	Bruce Griffin; 4,285; 9.20%	Daniel Giavedoni; 1,803; 3.87%	Jay Sobel; 482; 1.03%		Geng Tan†$
Etobicoke Centre	Yvan Baker; 32,800; 51.88%	Ted Opitz; 21,804; 34.49%	Heather Vickers-Wong; 4,881; 7.72%	Cameron Semple; 2,775; 4.39%	Nicholas Serdiuk; 664; 1.05%	Mark Wrzesniewski (Libert.); 295; 0.47%	Borys Wrzesnewskyj†
Etobicoke—Lakeshore	James Maloney; 36,061; 51.88%	Barry O'Brien; 19,952; 28.70%	Branko Gasperlin; 8,277; 11.91%	Chris Caldwell; 4,141; 5.96%	Jude Sulejmani; 921; 1.32%	Janice Murray (M-L); 163; 0.23%	James Maloney
Etobicoke North	Kirsty Duncan; 26,388; 61.44%	Sarabjit Kaur; 9,524; 22.18%	Naiima Farah; 4,654; 10.84%	Nancy Ghuman; 1,080; 2.51%	Renata Ford; 1,196; 2.78%	Sudhir Mehta (CFF); 104; 0.24%	Kirsty Duncan
Humber River—Black Creek	Judy Sgro; 23,187; 61.09%	Iftikhar Choudry; 6,164; 16.24%	Maria Augimeri; 7,198; 18.96%	Mike Schmitz; 804; 2.12%	Ania Krosinska; 402; 1.06%	Christine Nugent (M-L); 89; 0.23% Stenneth Smith (UPC); 114; 0.30%	Judy Sgro
Scarborough—Agincourt	Jean Yip; 21,115; 50.50%	Sean Hu; 15,492; 37.05%	Larisa Julius; 3,636; 8.70%	Randi Ramdeen; 1,050; 2.51%	Anthony Internicola; 521; 1.25%		Jean Yip
Scarborough Centre	Salma Zahid; 25,695; 55.19%	Irshad Chaudhry; 10,387; 22.31%	Faiz Kamal; 5,452; 11.71%	Dordana Hakimzadah; 1,336; 2.87%	Jeremiah Vijeyaratnam; 1,162; 2.50%	John Cannis (Ind.); 2,524; 5.42%	Salma Zahid
Scarborough-Guildwood	John McKay; 26,123; 61.12%	Quintus Thuraisingham; 9,553; 22.35%	Michelle Spencer; 4,806; 11.24%	Tara McMahon; 1,220; 2.85%	Jigna Jani; 648; 1.52%	Stephen Abara (Ind.); 70; 0.16% Farhan Alvi (CFF); 55; 0.13% Kevin Clarke (Ind.); 112; 0.26% Kathleen Marie Holding (Ind.); 70; 0.16% Gus Stefanis (CNP); 85; 0.20%	John McKay
Scarborough North	Shaun Chen; 20,911; 53.57%	David Kong; 11,838; 30.33%	Yan Chen; 5,039; 12.91%	Avery Velez; 796; 2.04%	Jude Guerrier; 370; 0.95%	Janet Robinson (UPC); 83; 0.21%	Shaun Chen
Scarborough—Rouge Park	Gary Anandasangaree; 31,360; 62.19%	Bobby Singh; 10,115; 20.06%	Kingsley Kwok; 5,801; 11.50%	Jessica Hamilton; 2,330; 4.62%	Dilano Sally; 467; 0.93%	Mark Theodoru (CHP); 353; 0.70%	Gary Anandasangaree
Scarborough Southwest	Bill Blair; 28,965; 57.20%	Kimberly Fawcett Smith; 10,502; 20.74%	Keith McCrady; 7,865; 15.53%	Amanda Cain; 2,477; 4.89%	Italo Erastostene; 590; 1.17%	Simon Luisi (Animal); 236; 0.47%	Bill Blair
Willowdale	Ali Ehsassi; 22,282; 49.00%	Daniel Lee; 16,452; 36.18%	Leah Kalsi; 4,231; 9.31%	Sharolyn Vettese; 1,671; 3.67%	Richard Hillier; 563; 1.24%	Birinder Singh Ahluwalia (Ind.); 200; 0.44% Shodja Ziaian (Ind.); 71; 0.16%	Ali Ehsassi
York Centre	Michael Levitt; 21,680; 50.20%	Rachel Willson; 15,852; 36.71%	Andrea Vásquez Jiménez; 4,251; 9.84%	Rebecca Wood; 1,403; 3.25%			Michael Levitt

=== 2015 ===
==== Party rankings ====
Parties	1st	2nd	3rd	4th
Liberal	25	0	0	0
Conservative	0	16	9	0
New Democratic	0	9	16	0
Green	0	0	0	25

Electoral district	Candidates							Incumbent
Electoral district	Conservative	NDP	Liberal	Green	Libertarian	Marxist-Leninist	Other	Incumbent
Beaches—East York	Bill Burrows; 9,124; 16.43%	Matthew Kellway; 17,113; 30.82%	Nathaniel Erskine-Smith; 27,458; 49.45%	Randall Sach; 1,433; 2.58%		Roger Carter; 105; 0.19%	James Sears (Ind.) (Note: Sears is the leader of The New Constitution Party of Canada which was ineligible to be on the ballot; he chose to be listed as an Independent.); 254 0.46%	Matthew Kellway
Beaches—East York	Bill Burrows; 9,124; 16.43%	Matthew Kellway; 17,113; 30.82%	Nathaniel Erskine-Smith; 27,458; 49.45%	Randall Sach; 1,433; 2.58%		Roger Carter; 105; 0.19%	Peter Surjanac (Ind.); 43 0.08%	Matthew Kellway
Davenport	Carlos Oliveira; 5,233; 10.55%	Andrew Cash; 20,506; 41.36%	Julie Dzerowicz; 21,947; 44.26%	Dan Stein; 1,530; 3.09%			Miguel Figueroa (Comm.); 261 0.53%	Andrew Cash
Davenport	Carlos Oliveira; 5,233; 10.55%	Andrew Cash; 20,506; 41.36%	Julie Dzerowicz; 21,947; 44.26%	Dan Stein; 1,530; 3.09%			Chai Kalevar (Ind.); 107 0.22%	Andrew Cash
Don Valley West	John Carmichael; 19,206; 37.60%	Syeda Riaz; 3,076; 6.02%	Rob Oliphant; 27,472; 53.78%	Natalie Hunt; 848; 1.66%	John Kittredge; 325; 0.64%		Sharon Cromwell (Ind.); 75 0.15%	John Carmichael
Don Valley West	John Carmichael; 19,206; 37.60%	Syeda Riaz; 3,076; 6.02%	Rob Oliphant; 27,472; 53.78%	Natalie Hunt; 848; 1.66%	John Kittredge; 325; 0.64%		Elizabeth Hill (Comm.); 84 0.16%	John Carmichael
Eglinton—Lawrence	Joe Oliver; 23,788; 42.64%	Andrew Thomson; 3,505; 6.28%	Marco Mendicino; 27,278; 48.89%	Matthew Chisholm; 799; 1.43%	Ethan Buchman; 308; 0.55%		Rudy Brunell Solomonovici (Animal All.); 114; 0.20%	Joe Oliver
Parkdale—High Park	Ian Allen; 7,641; 13.05%	Peggy Nash; 23,566; 40.24%	Arif Virani; 24,623; 42.04%	Adam Phipps; 1,743; 2.98%	Mark Jeftovic; 610; 1.04%	Lorne Gershuny; 100; 0.17%	Terry Parker (Mar.); 191 0.33%	Peggy Nash
Parkdale—High Park	Ian Allen; 7,641; 13.05%	Peggy Nash; 23,566; 40.24%	Arif Virani; 24,623; 42.04%	Adam Phipps; 1,743; 2.98%	Mark Jeftovic; 610; 1.04%	Lorne Gershuny; 100; 0.17%	Carol Royer (Ind.); 93 0.16%	Peggy Nash
Spadina—Fort York	Sabrina Zuniga; 8,673; 15.73%	Olivia Chow; 15,047; 27.28%	Adam Vaughan; 30,141; 54.65%	Sharon Danley; 1,137; 2.06%		Nick Lin; 59; 0.11%	Michael Nicula (PACT); 91; 0.17%	Adam Vaughan; Trinity—Spadina
Toronto Centre	Julian Di Battista; 6,167; 12.19%	Linda McQuaig; 13,467; 26.61%	Bill Morneau; 29,297; 57.90%	Colin Biggin; 1,315; 2.60%		Philip Fernandez; 76; 0.15%	Mariam Ahmad (Comm.); 133 0.26%	Chrystia Freeland‡
Toronto Centre	Julian Di Battista; 6,167; 12.19%	Linda McQuaig; 13,467; 26.61%	Bill Morneau; 29,297; 57.90%	Colin Biggin; 1,315; 2.60%		Philip Fernandez; 76; 0.15%	Jordan Stone (Ind.); 147 0.29%	Chrystia Freeland‡
Toronto—Danforth	Benjamin Dichter; 5,478; 9.86%	Craig Scott; 22,325; 40.17%	Julie Dabrusin; 23,531; 42.34%	Chris Tolley; 2,618; 4.71%			Elizabeth Abbott (Animal All.); 354 0.64%	Craig Scott
Toronto—Danforth	Benjamin Dichter; 5,478; 9.86%	Craig Scott; 22,325; 40.17%	Julie Dabrusin; 23,531; 42.34%	Chris Tolley; 2,618; 4.71%			John Richardson (PC); 1,275 2.29%	Craig Scott
Toronto—St. Paul's	Marnie MacDougall; 15,376; 26.99%	Noah Richler; 8,386; 14.72%	Carolyn Bennett; 31,481; 55.26%	Kevin Farmer; 1,729; 3.03%				Carolyn Bennett; St. Paul's
University—Rosedale	Karim Jivraj; 9,790; 17.51%	Jennifer Hollett; 15,988; 28.59%	Chrystia Freeland; 27,849; 49.80%	Nick Wright; 1,641; 2.93%	Jesse Waslowski; 233; 0.42%	Steve Rutchinski; 51; 0.09%	David Berlin (TBP); 122 0.22%	New District
University—Rosedale	Karim Jivraj; 9,790; 17.51%	Jennifer Hollett; 15,988; 28.59%	Chrystia Freeland; 27,849; 49.80%	Nick Wright; 1,641; 2.93%	Jesse Waslowski; 233; 0.42%	Steve Rutchinski; 51; 0.09%	Drew Garvie (Comm.); 125 0.22%	New District
University—Rosedale	Karim Jivraj; 9,790; 17.51%	Jennifer Hollett; 15,988; 28.59%	Chrystia Freeland; 27,849; 49.80%	Nick Wright; 1,641; 2.93%	Jesse Waslowski; 233; 0.42%	Steve Rutchinski; 51; 0.09%	Simon Luisi (Animal All.); 126 0.23%	New District
York South—Weston	James Robinson; 8,399; 19.22%	Mike Sullivan; 13,281; 30.39%	Ahmed Hussen; 20,093; 45.97%	John Johnson; 892; 2.04%	Stephen Lepone; 1,041; 2.38%			Mike Sullivan

Electoral district	Candidates					Incumbent
Electoral district	Conservative	NDP	Liberal	Green	Other	Incumbent
Don Valley East	Maureen Harquail; 12,155; 29.23%	Khalid Ahmed; 4,307; 10.36%	Yasmin Ratansi; 24,048; 57.82%	Laura Elizabeth Sanderson; 1,078; 2.59%		Joe Daniel‡
Don Valley North	Joe Daniel; 17,279; 37.82%	Akil Sadikali; 3,896; 8.53%	Geng Tan; 23,494; 51.42%	Caroline Brown; 1,018; 2.23%		New District
Etobicoke Centre	Ted Opitz; 23,070; 37.33%	Tanya De Mello; 4,886; 7.91%	Borys Wrzesnewskyj; 32,612; 52.77%	Shawn Rizvi; 856; 1.39%	Rob Wolvin (PC); 378; 0.61%	Ted Opitz
Etobicoke—Lakeshore	Bernard Trottier; 20,932; 32.45%	Phil Trotter; 7,030; 10.90%	James Maloney; 34,638; 53.70%	Angela Salewsky; 1,507; 2.34%	Janice Murray (M-L); 168 0.26%	Bernard Trottier
Etobicoke—Lakeshore	Bernard Trottier; 20,932; 32.45%	Phil Trotter; 7,030; 10.90%	James Maloney; 34,638; 53.70%	Angela Salewsky; 1,507; 2.34%	Liz White (Animal All.); 233 0.36%	Bernard Trottier
Etobicoke North	Toyin Dada; 9,673; 23.00%	Faisal Hassan; 5,220; 12.41%	Kirsty Duncan; 26,251; 62.41%	Akhtar Ayub; 524; 1.25%	Anna Di Carlo (M-L); 232 0.55%	Kirsty Duncan
Etobicoke North	Toyin Dada; 9,673; 23.00%	Faisal Hassan; 5,220; 12.41%	Kirsty Duncan; 26,251; 62.41%	Akhtar Ayub; 524; 1.25%	George Szebik (NA); 164 0.39%	Kirsty Duncan
Humber River—Black Creek	Kerry Vandenberg; 7,228; 20.16%	Darnel Harris; 3,851; 10.74%	Judy Sgro; 23,995; 66.91%	Keith Jarrett; 584; 1.63%	Christine Nugent (M-L); 201; 0.56%	Judy Sgro; York West
Scarborough—Agincourt	Bin Chang; 15,802; 38.03%	Laura Patrick; 3,263; 7.85%	Arnold Chan; 21,587; 51.95%	Debra Scott; 570; 1.37%	Jude Coutinho (CHP); 334; 0.80%	Arnold Chan
Scarborough Centre	Roxanne James; 14,705; 32.66%	Alex Wilson; 5,227; 11.61%	Salma Zahid; 22,753; 50.53%	Lindsay Thompson; 960; 2.13%	Katerina Androutsos (Libert.); 1,384; 3.07%	Roxanne James
Scarborough-Guildwood	Chuck Konkel; 11,108; 26.50%	Laura Casselman; 4,720; 11.26%	John McKay; 25,167; 60.04%	Kathleen Holding; 606; 1.45%	Kevin Clarke (Ind.); 175 0.42%	John McKay
Scarborough-Guildwood	Chuck Konkel; 11,108; 26.50%	Laura Casselman; 4,720; 11.26%	John McKay; 25,167; 60.04%	Kathleen Holding; 606; 1.45%	Paul Coulbeck (Mar.); 141 0.34%	John McKay
Scarborough North	Ravinder Malhi; 10,737; 27.40%	Rathika Sitsabaiesan; 8,648; 22.07%	Shaun Chen; 18,904; 48.24%	Eleni MacDonald; 579; 1.48%	Aasia Khatoon (Ind.); 156 0.40%	Rathika Sitsabaiesan; Scarborough—Rouge River
Scarborough North	Ravinder Malhi; 10,737; 27.40%	Rathika Sitsabaiesan; 8,648; 22.07%	Shaun Chen; 18,904; 48.24%	Eleni MacDonald; 579; 1.48%	Raphael Rosch (Ind.); 164 0.42%	Rathika Sitsabaiesan; Scarborough—Rouge River
Scarborough— Rouge Park	Leslyn Lewis; 13,587; 27.36%	KM Shanthikumar; 5,145; 10.36%	Gary Anandasangaree; 29,913; 60.24%	Calvin Winter; 1,010; 2.03%		New District
Scarborough Southwest	Roshan Nallaratnam; 10,347; 21.22%	Dan Harris; 11,574; 23.73%	Bill Blair; 25,586; 52.47%	Tommy Taylor; 1,259; 2.58%		Dan Harris
Willowdale	Chungsen Leung; 16,990; 36.97%	Pouyan Tabasinejad; 3,203; 6.97%	Ali Ehsassi; 24,519; 53.36%	James Arruda; 1,025; 2.23%	Birinder Singh Ahluwalia (Ind.); 216; 0.47%	Chungsen Leung
York Centre	Mark Adler; 18,893; 43.99%	Hal Berman; 3,148; 7.33%	Michael Levitt; 20,131; 46.88%	Constantine Kritsonis; 772; 1.80%		Mark Adler

=== 2011 ===
==== Party rankings ====
Parties	1st	2nd	3rd	4th
Conservative	8	6	8	0
New Democratic	8	2	12	0
Liberal	6	14	2	0
Green	0	0	0	20

Electoral district	Candidates					Incumbent
Electoral district	Conservative	Liberal	NDP	Green	Other	Incumbent
Beaches—East York	Bill Burrows; 11,067; 22.74%	Maria Minna; 14,967; 30.75%	Matthew Kellway; 20,265; 41.64%	Aaron Cameron; 2,240; 4.60%	Roger Carter (M-L); 130; 0.27%	Maria Minna
Davenport	Theresa Rodrigues; 5,573; 14.20%	Mario Silva; 10,946; 27.89%	Andrew Cash; 21,096; 53.74%	Wayne Scott; 1,344; 3.42%	Miguel Figueroa (Comm.); 167 0.43%	Mario Silva
Davenport	Theresa Rodrigues; 5,573; 14.20%	Mario Silva; 10,946; 27.89%	Andrew Cash; 21,096; 53.74%	Wayne Scott; 1,344; 3.42%	Simon Luisi (AAEVP); 128 0.33%	Mario Silva
Don Valley West	John Carmichael; 22,962; 42.93%	Rob Oliphant; 22,351; 41.79%	Nicole Yovanoff; 6,280; 11.74%	Georgina Wilcock; 1,703; 3.18%	Dimitris Kabitsis (Comm.); 186; 0.35%	Rob Oliphant
Eglinton—Lawrence	Joe Oliver; 22,652; 46.81%	Joe Volpe; 18,590; 38.42%	Justin Chatwin; 5,613; 11.60%	Paul William Baker; 1,534; 3.17%		Joe Volpe
Parkdale—High Park	Taylor Train; 7,924; 15.55%	Gerard Kennedy; 16,757; 32.89%	Peggy Nash; 24,046; 47.20%	Sarah Newton; 1,666; 3.27%	Andrew Borkowski (CHP); 251 0.49%	Gerard Kennedy
Parkdale—High Park	Taylor Train; 7,924; 15.55%	Gerard Kennedy; 16,757; 32.89%	Peggy Nash; 24,046; 47.20%	Sarah Newton; 1,666; 3.27%	Lorne Gershuny (M-L); 86 0.17%	Gerard Kennedy
Parkdale—High Park	Taylor Train; 7,924; 15.55%	Gerard Kennedy; 16,757; 32.89%	Peggy Nash; 24,046; 47.20%	Sarah Newton; 1,666; 3.27%	Terry Parker (Mar.); 215 0.42%	Gerard Kennedy
St. Paul's	Maureen Harquail; 17,864; 32.37%	Carolyn Bennett; 22,409; 40.60%	William Molls; 12,124; 21.97%	Jim McGarva; 2,495; 4.52%	John Kittredge (Libert.); 303; 0.55%	Carolyn Bennett
Toronto Centre	Kevin Moore; 12,604; 22.64%	Bob Rae; 22,832; 41.01%	Susan Wallace; 16,818; 30.21%	Ellen Michelson; 2,796; 5.02%	Judi Falardeau (Libert.); 277 0.50%	Bob Rae
Toronto Centre	Kevin Moore; 12,604; 22.64%	Bob Rae; 22,832; 41.01%	Susan Wallace; 16,818; 30.21%	Ellen Michelson; 2,796; 5.02%	Philip Fernandez (M-L); 76 0.14%	Bob Rae
Toronto Centre	Kevin Moore; 12,604; 22.64%	Bob Rae; 22,832; 41.01%	Susan Wallace; 16,818; 30.21%	Ellen Michelson; 2,796; 5.02%	Catherine Holliday (Comm.); 159 0.29%	Bob Rae
Toronto Centre	Kevin Moore; 12,604; 22.64%	Bob Rae; 22,832; 41.01%	Susan Wallace; 16,818; 30.21%	Ellen Michelson; 2,796; 5.02%	Bahman Yazdanfar (Ind.); 108 0.19%	Bob Rae
Toronto—Danforth	Katarina von Koenig; 6,885; 14.32%	Andrew Lang; 8,472; 17.62%	Jack Layton; 29,235; 60.80%	Adriana Mugnatto-Hamu; 3,107; 6.46%	Marie Crawford (AAEVP); 387; 0.80%	Jack Layton
Trinity—Spadina	Gin Siow; 10,976; 16.81%	Christine Innes; 15,276; 23.39%	Olivia Chow; 35,601; 54.51%	Rachel Barney; 2,861; 4.38%	Chester Brown (Libert.); 456 0.70%	Olivia Chow
Trinity—Spadina	Gin Siow; 10,976; 16.81%	Christine Innes; 15,276; 23.39%	Olivia Chow; 35,601; 54.51%	Rachel Barney; 2,861; 4.38%	Nick Lin (M-L); 140 0.21%	Olivia Chow
York South—Weston	Jilian Saweczko; 8,559; 24.32%	Alan Tonks; 11,542; 32.79%	Mike Sullivan; 14,122; 40.12%	Sonny Day; 975; 2.77%		Alan Tonks

Electoral district	Candidates					Incumbent
Electoral district	Conservative	Liberal	NDP	Green	Other	Incumbent
Don Valley East	Joe Daniel; 14,422; 36.78%	Yasmin Ratansi; 13,552; 34.56%	Mary Trapani Hynes; 9,878; 25.19%	Akil Sadikali; 1,114; 2.84%	Ryan Kidd (CHP); 246; 0.63%	Yasmin Ratansi
Etobicoke Centre	Ted Opitz; 21,644; 41.21%	Borys Wrzesnewskyj; 21,618; 41.16%	Ana Maria Rivero; 7,735; 14.73%	Katarina Zoricic; 1,377; 2.62%	Sarah Thompson (M-L); 149; 0.28%	Borys Wrzesnewskyj
Etobicoke—Lakeshore	Bernard Trottier; 21,997; 40.35%	Michael Ignatieff; 19,128; 35.08%	Michael Erickson; 11,046; 20.26%	Dave Corail; 2,159; 3.96%	Janice Murray (M-L); 190; 0.35%	Michael Ignatieff
Etobicoke North	Priti Lamba; 10,357; 32.13%	Kirsty Duncan; 13,665; 42.39%	Diana Andrews; 7,630; 23.67%		Anna Di Carlo (M-L); 186 0.58%	Kirsty Duncan
Etobicoke North	Priti Lamba; 10,357; 32.13%	Kirsty Duncan; 13,665; 42.39%	Diana Andrews; 7,630; 23.67%		Alex Dvornyak (Libert.); 208 0.65	Kirsty Duncan
Etobicoke North	Priti Lamba; 10,357; 32.13%	Kirsty Duncan; 13,665; 42.39%	Diana Andrews; 7,630; 23.67%		John C. Gardner (CHP); 189 0.59%	Kirsty Duncan
Scarborough—Agincourt	Harry Tsai; 13,930; 34.18%	Jim Karygiannis; 18,498; 45.39%	Nancy Patchell; 7,736; 18.10%	Pauline Thompson; 946; 2.32%		Jim Karygiannis
Scarborough Centre	Roxanne James; 13,498; 35.55%	John Cannis; 12,028; 31.68%	Natalie Hundt; 11,443; 30.14%	Ella Ng; 998; 2.63%		John Cannis
Scarborough-Guildwood	Chuck Konkel; 13,158; 34.39%	John McKay; 13,849; 36.20%	Danielle Ouellette; 10,145; 26.52%	Alonzo Bartley; 848; 2.22%	Paul Coulbeck (Ind.); 259; 0.68%	John McKay
Scarborough—Rouge River	Marlene Gallyot; 13,935; 29.90%	Rana Sarkar; 12,699; 27.25%	Rathika Sitsabaiesan; 18,935; 40.62%	George B. Singh; 684; 1.47%	Mark Balack (Ind.); 357; 0.77%	Derek Lee†
Scarborough Southwest	Gavan Paranchothy; 12,830; 31.85%	Michelle Simson; 11,699; 29.04%	Dan Harris; 14,119; 35.05%	Stefan Dixon; 1,635; 4.06%		Michelle Simson
Willowdale	Chungsen Leung; 22,207; 41.70%	Martha Hall Findlay; 21,275; 39.95%	Mehdi Mollahasani; 9,777; 18.36%			Martha Hall Findlay
York Centre	Mark Adler; 20,356; 48.50%	Ken Dryden; 13,979; 33.31%	Nick Brownlee; 6,656; 15.86%	Rosemary Frei; 979; 2.33%		Ken Dryden
York West	Audrey Walters; 6,122; 22.08%	Judy Sgro; 13,030; 47.00%	Giulio Manfrini; 7,721; 27.85%	Unblind Kheper Keseb Efekh Tibbin; 450; 1.62%	George Okoth Otura (CHP); 231 0.83%	Judy Sgro
York West	Audrey Walters; 6,122; 22.08%	Judy Sgro; 13,030; 47.00%	Giulio Manfrini; 7,721; 27.85%	Unblind Kheper Keseb Efekh Tibbin; 450; 1.62%	Arthur Smitherman (CAP); 170 0.61%	Judy Sgro

=== 2008 ===
==== Party rankings ====
Parties	1st	2nd	3rd	4th
Liberal	20	2	0	0
New Democratic	2	4	16	0
Conservative	0	16	6	0
Green	0	0	0	22

Electoral district	Candidates						Incumbent
Electoral district	Conservative	Liberal	NDP	Green	Marxist-Leninist	Other	Incumbent
Beaches— East York	Caroline Alleslev; 7,907; 17.08%	Maria Minna; 18,967; 40.97%	Marilyn Churley; 14,875; 32.13%	Zoran Markovski; 4,389; 9.48%	Roger Carter; 155; 0.33%		Maria Minna
Davenport	Theresa Rodrigues; 3,838; 11.01%	Mario Silva; 15,953; 45.77%	Peter Ferreira; 10,896; 31.26%	Wayne Scott; 3,655; 10.49%	Sarah Thompson; 87; 0.25%	Miguel Figueroa (Comm.); 160 0.46%	Mario Silva
Davenport	Theresa Rodrigues; 3,838; 11.01%	Mario Silva; 15,953; 45.77%	Peter Ferreira; 10,896; 31.26%	Wayne Scott; 3,655; 10.49%	Sarah Thompson; 87; 0.25%	Wendy Forrest (Ind.); 172 0.49%	Mario Silva
Davenport	Theresa Rodrigues; 3,838; 11.01%	Mario Silva; 15,953; 45.77%	Peter Ferreira; 10,896; 31.26%	Wayne Scott; 3,655; 10.49%	Sarah Thompson; 87; 0.25%	Simon Luisi (AAEVP); 92 0.26%	Mario Silva
Don Valley West	John Carmichael; 19,441; 38.83%	Rob Oliphant; 22,112; 44.36%	David Sparrow; 5,102; 10.19%	Georgina Wilcock; 3,155; 6.30%		Catherine Holiday (Comm.); 162 0.32%	Vacant
Eglinton—Lawrence	Joe Oliver; 17,073; 39.25%	Joe Volpe; 19,113; 43.99%	Justin Chatwin; 3,663; 8.42%	Andrew James; 3,629; 8.34%			Joe Volpe
Parkdale— High Park	Jilian Saweczko; 5,992; 12.44%	Gerard Kennedy; 20,705; 42.98%	Peggy Nash; 17,332; 35.97%	Rob Rishchynski; 3,601; 7.47%	Lorne Gershuny; 110; 0.23%	Andrew Borkowski (CHP); 230 0.48%	Peggy Nash
Parkdale— High Park	Jilian Saweczko; 5,992; 12.44%	Gerard Kennedy; 20,705; 42.98%	Peggy Nash; 17,332; 35.97%	Rob Rishchynski; 3,601; 7.47%	Lorne Gershuny; 110; 0.23%	Terry Parker (Mar.); 209 0.43%	Peggy Nash
St. Paul's	Heather Jewell; 13,948; 26.86%	Carolyn Bennett; 26,286; 50.61%	Anita Agrawal; 6,666; 12.83%	Justin Erdman; 4,726; 9.10%		John Kittredge (Libert.); 312; 0.60%	Carolyn Bennett
Toronto Centre	David Peter Gentili; 9,402; 18.33%	Bob Rae; 27,462; 53.53%	El-Farouk Khaki; 7,741; 15.09%	Ellen Michelson; 6,081; 11.85%	Philip Fernandez; 92; 0.18%	Johan Boyden (Comm.); 193 0.38%	Bob Rae
Toronto Centre	David Peter Gentili; 9,402; 18.33%	Bob Rae; 27,462; 53.53%	El-Farouk Khaki; 7,741; 15.09%	Ellen Michelson; 6,081; 11.85%	Philip Fernandez; 92; 0.18%	Gerald Derome (Ind.); 146 0.28%	Bob Rae
Toronto Centre	David Peter Gentili; 9,402; 18.33%	Bob Rae; 27,462; 53.53%	El-Farouk Khaki; 7,741; 15.09%	Ellen Michelson; 6,081; 11.85%	Philip Fernandez; 92; 0.18%	Liz White (AAEVP); 187 0.36%	Bob Rae
Toronto—Danforth	Christina Perreault; 5,287; 11.65%	Andrew Lang; 13,336; 29.38%	Jack Layton; 20,323; 44.78%	Sharon Howarth; 5,955; 13.21%	Marcell Rodden; 87; 0.19%	Marie Crawford (AAEVP); 175 0.39%	Jack Layton
Toronto—Danforth	Christina Perreault; 5,287; 11.65%	Andrew Lang; 13,336; 29.38%	Jack Layton; 20,323; 44.78%	Sharon Howarth; 5,955; 13.21%	Marcell Rodden; 87; 0.19%	John Richardson (Ind.); 130 0.29%	Jack Layton
Toronto—Danforth	Christina Perreault; 5,287; 11.65%	Andrew Lang; 13,336; 29.38%	Jack Layton; 20,323; 44.78%	Sharon Howarth; 5,955; 13.21%	Marcell Rodden; 87; 0.19%	Bahman Yazdanfar (CAP); 54 0.12%	Jack Layton
Trinity—Spadina	Christine McGirr; 8,249; 13.78%	Christine Innes; 20,970; 35.02%	Olivia Chow; 24,454; 40.84%	Stephen La Frenie; 5,418; 9.05%		Carlos Santos Almeida (Ind.); 164 0.27%	Olivia Chow
Trinity—Spadina	Christine McGirr; 8,249; 13.78%	Christine Innes; 20,970; 35.02%	Olivia Chow; 24,454; 40.84%	Stephen La Frenie; 5,418; 9.05%		Chester Brown (Libert.); 491 0.82%	Olivia Chow
Trinity—Spadina	Christine McGirr; 8,249; 13.78%	Christine Innes; 20,970; 35.02%	Olivia Chow; 24,454; 40.84%	Stephen La Frenie; 5,418; 9.05%		Val Illie (Ind.); 132 0.22%	Olivia Chow
York South—Weston	Aydin Cocelli; 7,021; 20.36%	Alan Tonks; 16,071; 46.60%	Mike Sullivan; 9,641; 27.95%	Andre Papadimitriou; 1,757; 5.09%			Alan Tonks

Electoral district	Candidates					Incumbent
Electoral district	Conservative	Liberal	NDP	Green	Other	Incumbent
Don Valley East	Eugene McDermott; 11,777; 31.00%	Yasmin Ratansi; 18,264; 48.08%	Mary Trapani Hynes; 5,062; 13.33%	Wayne Clements; 2,618; 6.89%	Alex Kovalenko (CHP); 266; 0.70%	Yasmin Ratansi
Etobicoke Centre	Axel Kuhn; 18,839; 37.51%	Borys Wrzesnewskyj; 24,537; 48.85%	Joseph Schwartz; 4,164; 8.29%	Marion Schaffer; 2,688; 5.35%		Borys Wrzesnewskyj
Etobicoke—Lakeshore	Patrick Boyer; 17,793; 34.87%	Michael Ignatieff; 23,536; 46.13%	Liam McHugh-Russell; 5,950; 11.66%	Dave Corail; 3,562; 6.98%	Janice Murray (M-L); 181; 0.35%	Michael Ignatieff
Etobicoke North	Bob Saroya; 9,436; 30.07%	Kirsty Duncan; 15,244; 48.58%	Ali Naqvi; 4,940; 15.74%	Nigel Barriffe; 1,460; 4.65%	Anna Di Carlo (M-L); 300; 0.96%	Roy Cullen†
Scarborough—Agincourt	Benson Lau; 11,836; 29.41%	Jim Karygiannis; 22,795; 56.63%	Simon Dougherty; 3,738; 9.31%	Adrian Molder; 1,870; 4.65%		Jim Karygiannis
Scarborough Centre	Roxanne James; 11,088; 30.11%	John Cannis; 17,927; 48.68%	Natalie Hundt; 5,801; 15.75%	Ella Ng; 2,011; 5.46%		John Cannis
Scarborough—Guildwood	Chuck Konkel; 10,881; 30.16%	John McKay; 18,098; 50.17%	Sania Khan; 5,183; 14.37%	Alonzo Bartley; 1,913; 5.30%		John McKay
Scarborough—Rouge River	Jerry Bance; 9,160; 22.70%	Derek Lee; 23,718; 58.78%	Ryan Sloan; 5,936; 14.71%	Attila Nagy; 1,207; 2.99%	Alan Mercer (Libert.); 331; 0.82%	Derek Lee
Scarborough Southwest	Greg Crompton; 10,928; 29.52%	Michelle Simson; 15,486; 41.83%	Alamgir Hussain; 6,943; 18.75%	Stefan Dixon; 3,514; 9.49%	M. H. Fatique Chowdhury Kabir (Ind.); 151; 0.41%	Tom Wappel†
Willowdale	Jake Karns; 15,931; 32.46%	Martha Hall Findlay; 23,889; 48.67%	Susan Wallace; 5,011; 10.21%	Lou Carcasole; 3,130; 6.38%	Bernadette Michael (Ind.); 260 0.53%	Martha Hall Findlay
Willowdale	Jake Karns; 15,931; 32.46%	Martha Hall Findlay; 23,889; 48.67%	Susan Wallace; 5,011; 10.21%	Lou Carcasole; 3,130; 6.38%	Bahman Roudgarnia (PC); 864 1.76%	Martha Hall Findlay
York Centre	Rochelle Wilner; 14,132; 38.00%	Ken Dryden; 16,164; 43.46%	Kurtis Baily; 4,503; 12.11%	Rosemary Frei; 2,390; 6.43%		Ken Dryden
York West	Kevin Nguyen; 4,773; 16.68%	Judy Sgro; 16,997; 59.39%	Giulio Manfrini; 5,363; 18.74%	Nick Capra; 1,488; 5.20%		Judy Sgro

=== 2006 ===
==== Party rankings ====
Parties	1st	2nd	3rd	4th
Liberal	19	3	0	0
Conservative	0	15	7	0
New Democratic	3	4	15	0
Green	0	0	0	22

Electoral district	Candidates						Incumbent
Electoral district	Liberal	Conservative	NDP	Green	Marxist-Leninist	Other	Incumbent
Beaches—East York	Maria Minna; 20,678; 40.39%	Peter Conroy; 9,238; 18.04%	Marilyn Churley; 17,900; 34.96%	Jim Harris; 3,106; 6.07%	Roger Carter; 91; 0.18%	Jim Love (PC); 183; 0.36%	Maria Minna
Davenport	Mario Silva; 20,172; 51.87%	Theresa Rodrigues; 4,202; 10.80%	Gord Perks; 12,681; 32.61%	Mark O'Brien; 1,440; 3.70%	Sarah Thompson; 103; 0.26%	Miguel Figueroa (Comm.); 172 0.44%	Mario Silva
Davenport	Mario Silva; 20,172; 51.87%	Theresa Rodrigues; 4,202; 10.80%	Gord Perks; 12,681; 32.61%	Mark O'Brien; 1,440; 3.70%	Sarah Thompson; 103; 0.26%	Wendy Forrest (CAP); 122 0.31%	Mario Silva
Don Valley West	John Godfrey; 28,709; 53.36%	John Carmichael; 17,908; 33.29%	David Thomas; 4,902; 9.11%	Daphne So; 1,906; 3.54%		Paul Barnes (CAP); 151 0.28%	John Godfrey
Don Valley West	John Godfrey; 28,709; 53.36%	John Carmichael; 17,908; 33.29%	David Thomas; 4,902; 9.11%	Daphne So; 1,906; 3.54%		Soumen Deb (Libert.); 226 0.42%	John Godfrey
Eglinton—Lawrence	Joe Volpe; 26,044; 52.89%	Peter Coy; 14,897; 30.25%	Maurganne Mooney; 5,660; 11.49%	Patrick Metzger; 2,520; 5.12%		John Brian Steele (NA); 123; 0.25%	Joe Volpe
Parkdale—High Park	Sarmite Sam Bulte; 18,489; 35.94%	Jurij Klufas; 8,777; 17.06%	Peggy Nash; 20,790; 40.41%	Robert L. Rishchynski; 2,840; 5.52%	Lorne Gershuny; 124; 0.24%	Beverly Bernardo (NA); 119 0.23%	Sarmite Bulte
Parkdale—High Park	Sarmite Sam Bulte; 18,489; 35.94%	Jurij Klufas; 8,777; 17.06%	Peggy Nash; 20,790; 40.41%	Robert L. Rishchynski; 2,840; 5.52%	Lorne Gershuny; 124; 0.24%	Terry Parker (Mar.); 311 0.60%	Sarmite Bulte
St. Paul's	Carolyn Bennett; 29,295; 50.26%	Peter Kent; 15,021; 25.77%	Paul Summerville; 11,189; 19.20%	Kevin Farmer; 2,785; 4.78%			Carolyn Bennett
Toronto Centre	Bill Graham; 30,874; 52.23%	Lewis Reford; 10,763; 18.21%	Michael Shapcott; 14,036; 23.74%	Chris Tindal; 3,080; 5.21%	Philip Fernandez; 66; 0.11%	Johan Boyden (Comm.); 120 0.20%	Bill Graham
Toronto Centre	Bill Graham; 30,874; 52.23%	Lewis Reford; 10,763; 18.21%	Michael Shapcott; 14,036; 23.74%	Chris Tindal; 3,080; 5.21%	Philip Fernandez; 66; 0.11%	Michel Prairie (NA); 101 0.17%	Bill Graham
Toronto Centre	Bill Graham; 30,874; 52.23%	Lewis Reford; 10,763; 18.21%	Michael Shapcott; 14,036; 23.74%	Chris Tindal; 3,080; 5.21%	Philip Fernandez; 66; 0.11%	Liz White (AAEVP); 72 0.12%	Bill Graham
Toronto—Danforth	Deborah Coyne; 17,256; 34.23%	Kren Clausen; 4,992; 9.90%	Jack Layton; 24,412; 48.42%	Al Hart; 3,583; 7.11%	Marcell Rodden; 172; 0.34%		Jack Layton
Trinity—Spadina	Tony Ianno; 25,067; 40.14%	Sam Goldstein; 5,625; 9.01%	Olivia Chow; 28,748; 46.03%	Thom Chapman; 2,398; 3.84%	Nick Lin; 138; 0.22%	Asif Hossain (PC); 392 0.63%	Tony Ianno
Trinity—Spadina	Tony Ianno; 25,067; 40.14%	Sam Goldstein; 5,625; 9.01%	Olivia Chow; 28,748; 46.03%	Thom Chapman; 2,398; 3.84%	Nick Lin; 138; 0.22%	John Riddell (CAP); 82 0.13%	Tony Ianno
York South—Weston	Alan Tonks; 22,871; 57.06%	Steve Halicki; 6,991; 17.44%	Paul Ferreira; 8,525; 21.27%	Maria De Angelis-Pater; 1,506; 3.76%		Dragan Cimesa (Ind.); 189; 0.47%	Alan Tonks

Electoral district	Candidates					Incumbent
Electoral district	Liberal	Conservative	NDP	Green	Other	Incumbent
Don Valley East	Yasmin Ratansi; 23,441; 54.00%	Eugene McDermott; 12,661; 29.16%	Richard Alan Hennick; 5,597; 12.89%	Wayne Clements; 1,714; 3.95%		Yasmin Ratansi
Etobicoke Centre	Borys Wrzesnewskyj; 29,509; 52.44%	Axel Kuhn; 18,702; 33.24%	Cynthia Cameron; 5,426; 9.64%	John Vanderheyden; 2,111; 3.75%	Norman Dundas (PC); 402 0.71%	Borys Wrzesnewskyj
Etobicoke Centre	Borys Wrzesnewskyj; 29,509; 52.44%	Axel Kuhn; 18,702; 33.24%	Cynthia Cameron; 5,426; 9.64%	John Vanderheyden; 2,111; 3.75%	France Tremblay (M-L); 117 0.21%	Borys Wrzesnewskyj
Etobicoke— Lakeshore	Michael Ignatieff; 24,337; 43.63%	John Capobianco; 19,613; 35.16%	Liam McHugh-Russell; 8,685; 15.57%	Philip Ridge; 2,853; 5.11%	Cathy Holliday (Comm.); 186 0.33%	Jean Augustine†
Etobicoke— Lakeshore	Michael Ignatieff; 24,337; 43.63%	John Capobianco; 19,613; 35.16%	Liam McHugh-Russell; 8,685; 15.57%	Philip Ridge; 2,853; 5.11%	Janice Murray (M-L); 104 0.19%	Jean Augustine†
Etobicoke North	Roy Cullen; 22,195; 61.62%	Amanjit Singh Khroad; 8,049; 22.35%	Ali Naqvi; 3,820; 10.61%	George Jan Havlovic; 950; 2.64%	Alexander T. Bussmann (PC); 526 1.46%	Roy Cullen
Etobicoke North	Roy Cullen; 22,195; 61.62%	Amanjit Singh Khroad; 8,049; 22.35%	Ali Naqvi; 3,820; 10.61%	George Jan Havlovic; 950; 2.64%	Anna Di Carlo (M-L); 205 0.57%	Roy Cullen
Etobicoke North	Roy Cullen; 22,195; 61.62%	Amanjit Singh Khroad; 8,049; 22.35%	Ali Naqvi; 3,820; 10.61%	George Jan Havlovic; 950; 2.64%	George Szebik (Ind.); 273 0.76%	Roy Cullen
Scarborough— Agincourt	Jim Karygiannis; 28,065; 62.59%	Bill Redwood; 10,684; 23.83%	David Robertson; 4,969; 11.08%	Casey Maple; 1,120; 2.50%		Jim Karygiannis
Scarborough Centre	John Cannis; 23,332; 55.38%	Roxanne James; 11,522; 27.35%	Dorothy Laxton; 5,884; 13.96%	Andrew Strachan; 1,396; 3.31%		John Cannis
Scarborough— Guildwood	John McKay; 21,877; 53.26%	Pauline Browes; 11,790; 28.70%	Peter Campbell; 5,847; 14.23%	Mike Flanagan; 1,235; 3.01%	Farooq Khan (Ind.); 150 0.37%	John McKay
Scarborough— Guildwood	John McKay; 21,877; 53.26%	Pauline Browes; 11,790; 28.70%	Peter Campbell; 5,847; 14.23%	Mike Flanagan; 1,235; 3.01%	Andrew C. Thomas (Ind.); 82 0.20%	John McKay
Scarborough— Guildwood	John McKay; 21,877; 53.26%	Pauline Browes; 11,790; 28.70%	Peter Campbell; 5,847; 14.23%	Mike Flanagan; 1,235; 3.01%	Brenda Thompson (CAP); 98 0.24%	John McKay
Scarborough— Rouge River	Derek Lee; 30,285; 65.62%	Jerry Bance; 9,432; 20.44%	Andrew Brett; 4,972; 10.77%	Serge Abbat; 754; 1.63%	Yaqoob Khan (Ind.); 467 1.01%	Derek Lee
Scarborough— Rouge River	Derek Lee; 30,285; 65.62%	Jerry Bance; 9,432; 20.44%	Andrew Brett; 4,972; 10.77%	Serge Abbat; 754; 1.63%	Alan Mercer (Libert.); 243 0.53%	Derek Lee
Scarborough Southwest	Tom Wappel; 19,930; 47.83%	Vincent Veerasuntharam; 10,017; 24.04%	Dan Harris; 9,626; 23.10%	Valery Philip; 1,827; 4.38%	Elizabeth Rowley (Comm.); 120 0.29%	Tom Wappel
Scarborough Southwest	Tom Wappel; 19,930; 47.83%	Vincent Veerasuntharam; 10,017; 24.04%	Dan Harris; 9,626; 23.10%	Valery Philip; 1,827; 4.38%	Trevor Sutton (Ind.); 147 0.35%	Tom Wappel
Willowdale	Jim Peterson; 30,623; 55.23%	Jovan Boseovski; 16,254; 29.32%	Rochelle Carnegie; 6,297; 11.36%	Sharolyn Vettese; 2,268; 4.09%		Jim Peterson
York Centre	Ken Dryden; 22,468; 52.66%	Michael Mostyn; 12,828; 30.06%	Marco Iacampo; 5,813; 13.62%	Constantine Kritsonis; 1,560; 3.66%		Ken Dryden
York West	Judy Sgro; 21,418; 63.78%	Parm Gill; 6,244; 18.59%	Sandra Romano Anthony; 4,724; 14.07%	Nick Capra; 1,002; 2.98%	Axcel Cocon (Ind.); 192; 0.57%	Judy Sgro

=== 2004 ===
==== Party rankings ====
Parties	1st	2nd	3rd	4th
Liberal	21	1	0	0
Conservative	0	13	9	0
New Democratic	1	7	13	1
Green	0	0	0	18

Electoral district	Candidates					Incumbent
Electoral district	Liberal	Conservative	NDP	Green	Other	Incumbent
Beaches—East York	Maria Minna; 22,494	Nick Nikopoulos; 6,603	Peter Tabuns; 15,156	Peter James Davison; 2,127	553	Maria Minna
Davenport	Mario Silva; 16,773	Theresa Rodrigues; 3,077	Rui Pires; 11,292	Mark O'Brien; 1,384	564	Charles Caccia
Don Valley West	John Godfrey; 30,615	David Turnbull; 14,495	David Thomas; 4,393	Serge Abbat; 1,703		John Godfrey
Eglinton—Lawrence	Joe Volpe; 28,360	Bernie Tanz; 11,792	Max Silverman; 4,886	Shel Goldstein; 1,924	115	Joe Volpe
Parkdale—High Park	Sarmite Bulte; 19,727	Jurij Klufas; 7,221	Peggy Nash; 16,201	Neil Spiegel; 3,249	514	Sarmite Bulte
St. Paul's	Carolyn Bennett; 32,171	Barry Cline; 11,226	Norman Tobias; 8,667	Peter Elgie; 3,031		Carolyn Bennett
Toronto Centre	Bill Graham; 30,336	Megan Harris; 7,936	Michael Shapcott; 12,747	Gabriel Draven; 2,097	547	Bill Graham; Toronto Centre—Rosedale
Toronto—Danforth	Dennis Mills; 19,803	Loftus Cuddy; 2,975	Jack Layton; 22,198	Jim Harris; 2,575	349	Dennis Mills
Trinity—Spadina	Tony Ianno; 23,202	David Watters; 4,605	Olivia Chow; 22,397	Mark Vitala; 2,259	813	Tony Ianno
York South—Weston	Alan Tonks; 20,537	Stephen Halicki; 5,133	Paul Ferreira; 7,281	Jessica Fracassi; 1,199	175	Alan Tonks

Electoral district	Candidates					Incumbent
Electoral district	Liberal	Conservative	NDP	Green	Other	Incumbent
Don Valley East	Yasmin Ratansi; 21,864; 54.62%	David Johnson; 11,206; 27.99%	Valerie Mah; 5,287; 13.21%	Dan King; 1,172; 2.93%	Christopher Black (Comm.); 149 0.37%	David Collenette†
Don Valley East	Yasmin Ratansi; 21,864; 54.62%	David Johnson; 11,206; 27.99%	Valerie Mah; 5,287; 13.21%	Dan King; 1,172; 2.93%	Ryan Kidd (CHP); 351 0.88%	David Collenette†
Etobicoke Centre	Borys Wrzesnewskyj; 30,441; 58.28%	Lida Preyma; 14,829; 28.39%	John Richmond; 5,174; 9.91%	Margo Pearson; 1,676; 3.21%	France Tremblay (M-L); 112; 0.21%	Vacant (Note: Formerly held by Allan Rock (Liberal).)
Etobicoke—Lakeshore	Jean Augustine; 24,909; 50.24%	John Capobianco; 15,159; 30.58%	Margaret Anne McHugh; 7,179; 14.48%	John Huculiak; 2,201; 4.44%	Janice Murray (M-L); 129; 0.26%	Jean Augustine
Etobicoke North	Roy Cullen; 19,450; 63.32%	Rupinder Nannar; 5,737; 18.68%	Cesar Martello; 3,761; 12.24%	Mir Kamal; 605; 1.97%	Anna Di Carlo (M-L); 195 0.63%	Roy Cullen
Etobicoke North	Roy Cullen; 19,450; 63.32%	Rupinder Nannar; 5,737; 18.68%	Cesar Martello; 3,761; 12.24%	Mir Kamal; 605; 1.97%	George Szebik (Ind.); 309 1.01%	Roy Cullen
Etobicoke North	Roy Cullen; 19,450; 63.32%	Rupinder Nannar; 5,737; 18.68%	Cesar Martello; 3,761; 12.24%	Mir Kamal; 605; 1.97%	William Ubbens (CHP); 661 2.15%	Roy Cullen
Scarborough—Agincourt	Jim Karygiannis; 26,400; 64.08%	Andrew Faust; 8,649; 20.99%	D'Arcy Palmer; 4,182; 10.15%	Wayne Yeechong; 919; 2.23%	Tony J. Karadimas (PC); 1,048; 2.54%	Jim Karygiannis
Scarborough Centre	John Cannis; 20,740; 56.65%	John Mihtis; 8,515; 23.26%	Greg Gogan; 6,156; 16.82%	Greg Bonser; 1,045; 2.85%	Dorothy Sauras (Comm.); 152; 0.42%	John Cannis
Scarborough-Guildwood	John McKay; 20,950; 57.53%	Tom Varesh; 8,277; 22.73%	Sheila White; 5,885; 16.16%	Paul Charbonneau; 1,106; 3.04%	Brenda Thompson (CAP); 200; 0.55%	John McKay
Scarborough—Rouge River	Derek Lee; 22,564; 57.92%	Tony Backhurst; 5,184; 13.31%	Fauzia Khan; 3,635; 9.33%	Kathryn Holloway; 610; 1.57%	Raymond Cho (Ind.); 6,962; 17.87%	Derek Lee
Scarborough Southwest	Tom Wappel; 18,776; 49.46%	Heather Jewell; 9,028; 23.78%	Dan Harris; 8,471; 22.31%	Peter Van Dalen; 1,520; 4.00%	Elizabeth Rowley (Comm.); 168; 0.44%	Tom Wappel
Willowdale	Jim Peterson; 30,855; 61.39%	Jovan Boseovski; 11,615; 23.11%	Yvonne Bobb; 4,812; 9.57%	Sharolyn Vettese; 1,844; 3.67%	Ardavan Behrouzi (PC); 883 1.76%	Jim Peterson
Willowdale	Jim Peterson; 30,855; 61.39%	Jovan Boseovski; 11,615; 23.11%	Yvonne Bobb; 4,812; 9.57%	Sharolyn Vettese; 1,844; 3.67%	Bernadette Michael (Ind.); 253 0.50%	Jim Peterson
York Centre	Ken Dryden^{@} 21,520; 54.79%	Michael Mostyn; 10,318; 26.27%	Peter Flaherty; 5,376; 13.69%	Constantine Kritsonis; 1,240; 3.16%	Max Royz (Ind.); 824; 2.10%	Art Eggleton†
York West	Judy Sgro; 17,903; 64.74%	Leslie Soobrian; 3,120; 11.28%	Sandra Romano Anthony; 4,228; 15.29%	Tim McKellar; 824; 2.98%	Joseph Grubb (CHP); 1,580; 5.71%	Judy Sgro

==== Maps ====
1. Beaches-East York
2. Davenport
3. Don Valley West
4. Eglinton-Lawrence
5. Parkdale-High Park
6. St. Paul's
7. Toronto Centre
8. Toronto-Danforth
9. Trinity-Spadina
10. York South-Weston
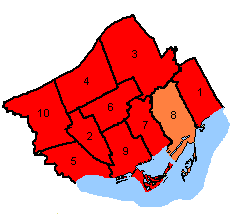
Key map

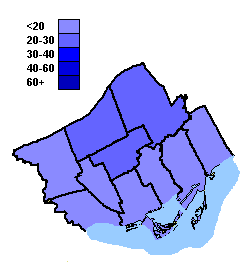
Conservative Party of Canada

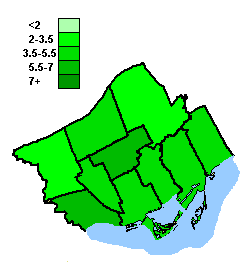
Green Party of Canada

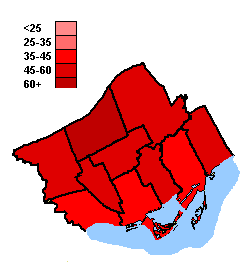
Liberal Party of Canada

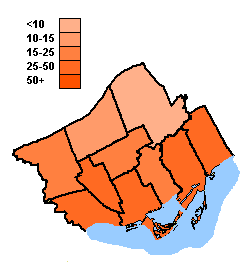
New Democratic Party

1. Don Valley East
2. Etobicoke Centre
3. Etobicoke-Lakeshore
4. Etobicoke North
5. Scarborough-Agincourt
6. Scarborough Centre
7. Scarborough-Guildwood
8. Scarborough-Rouge River
9. Scarborough Southwest
10. Willowdale
11. York West
12. York Centre
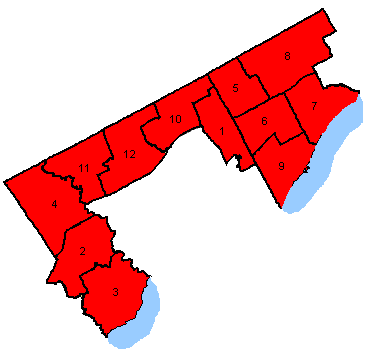
Key map

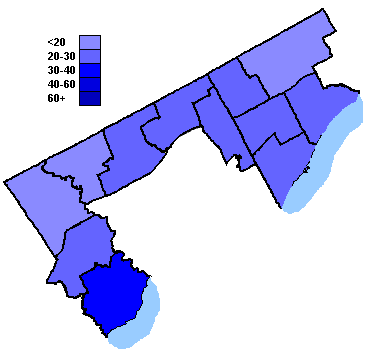
Conservative Party of Canada

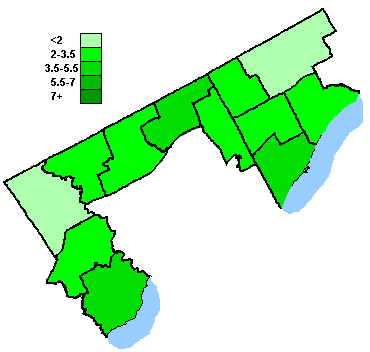
Green Party of Canada

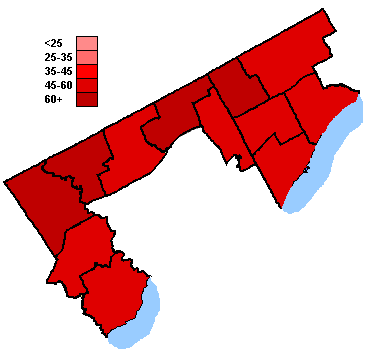
Liberal Party of Canada

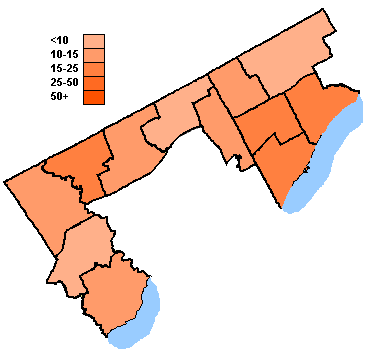
New Democratic Party

=== 2000 ===
==== Party rankings ====
Parties	1st	2nd	3rd	4th
Liberal	22	0	0	0
Alliance	0	11	6	5
Progressive Conservative	0	6	11	2
New Democratic	0	5	5	12

Electoral district	Candidates						Incumbent
Electoral district	Liberal	Canadian Alliance	NDP	PC	Green	Other	Incumbent
Beaches—East York	Maria Minna; 22,515	Abu Alam; 3,838	Mel Watkins; 8,936	Wayne Clutterbuck; 5,766	James Mendel; 599	1,033	Maria Minna
Davenport	Charles Caccia; 17,014	Anthony Montenegrino; 2,021	Jordan Berger; 3,457	Eduardo Marcos; 1,526	Mark O'Brien; 642	841	Charles Caccia
Don Valley West	John Godfrey; 25,329	John Wakelin; 7,239	Ali Naqvi; 2,024	Michael Murton; 10,583	No candidate	566	John Godfrey
Eglinton—Lawrence	Joe Volpe; 25,161	Joel Etienne; 5,497	Simon Rowland; 2,663	Louise Sankey; 7,156	Doug Howat; 688	297	Joe Volpe
Parkdale—High Park	Sarmite Bulte; 20,676	Vicki Vancas; 4,882	Paul Schmidt; 7,947	David Strycharz; 5,681	Neil Spiegel; 1,161	1,501	Jesse Flis
St. Paul's	Carolyn Bennett; 25,358	Theo Caldwell; 5,457	Guy Hunter; 4,451	Barry Cline; 10,099	Don Roebuck; 769	813	Carolyn Bennett
Toronto Centre—Rosedale	Bill Graham; 26,203	Richard Walker; 5,058	David Berlin; 5,300	Randall Pearce; 8,149	No candidate	2,649	Bill Graham
Toronto—Danforth	Dennis Mills; 20,330	Chris Butryn; 3,021	Paula Turtle; 10,830	Rose A. Dyson; 3,138	Robert Nevin; 769	1,080	Dennis Mills
Trinity—Spadina	Tony Ianno; 20,032	Lee Monaco; 2,250	Michael Valpy; 16,001	John E. Polko; 2,309	Matthew Hammond; 562	963	Tony Ianno
York South—Weston	Alan Tonks; 15,841	Dan Houssar; 1,754	Tom Parkin; 1,288	Jason Daniel Baker; 986	Denis Calnan; 293	John Nunziata; 14,344	John Nunziata
York South—Weston	Alan Tonks; 15,841	Dan Houssar; 1,754	Tom Parkin; 1,288	Jason Daniel Baker; 986	Denis Calnan; 293	Others; 232	John Nunziata

Electoral district	Candidates						Incumbent
Electoral district	Liberal	Canadian Alliance	NDP	PC	Marxist-Leninist	Other	Incumbent
Don Valley East	David Collenette; 25,915; 66.60%	Kasra Nejatian; 4,736; 12.17%	Ron Casey-Nestor; 2,249; 5.78%	Cecilia Fusco; 5,645; 14.51%	Judith Snow; 153; 0.39%	Ryan Kidd (NA); 212; 0.54%	David Collenette
Etobicoke Centre	Allan Rock; 26,083; 56.37%	Michael G. Craik; 10,318; 22.30%	Karen Dolan; 2,124; 4.59%	Ross Vaughan; 7,566; 16.35%	Dagmar Sullivan; 181; 0.39%		Allan Rock
Etobicoke—Lakeshore	Jean Augustine; 22,467; 51.78%	David Court; 9,160; 21.11%	Richard Joseph Banigan; 2,835; 6.53%	David Haslam; 8,453; 19.48%	Janice Murray; 116; 0.27%	Ed Bil (Comm.); 113 0.26% Don Jackson (NLP); 244 0.56%	Jean Augustine
Etobicoke North	Roy Cullen; 23,345; 72.54%	Mahmood Elahi; 6,280; 19.51%	Ana Maria Sapp; 2,210; 6.87%			Elizabeth Rowley (Comm.); 347; 1.08%	Roy Cullen
Scarborough—Agincourt	Jim Karygiannis; 26,986; 70.89%	Andrew Faust; 5,100; 13.40%	Michael Laxer; 1,499; 3.94%	Bruce Elliott; 4,030; 10.59%	Sarah Thompson; 112; 0.29%	Wayne Cook (CAP); 341; 0.90%	Jim Karygiannis
Scarborough Centre	John Cannis; 26,969; 67.51%	Bill Settatree; 8,849; 22.15%	Ali Mallah; 3,171; 7.94%			Paul Coulbeck (Mar.); 959; 2.40%	John Cannis
Scarborough East	John McKay; 24,019; 59.82%	Paul Calandra; 7,559; 18.83%	Denise Lake; 1,884; 4.69%	W. Paul McCrossan; 6,284; 15.65%	France Tremblay; 113; 0.28%	Dave Glover (CAP); 292; 0.73%	John McKay
Scarborough—Rouge River	Derek Lee; 28,669; 79.05%	Kaizer Suleman; 3,237; 8.93%	Paulette Senior; 1,793; 4.94%	Alan Shumak; 2,566; 7.08%			Derek Lee
Scarborough Southwest	Tom Wappel; 21,466; 60.01%	Nabil El-Khazen; 4,912; 13.73%	Dan Harris; 3,638; 10.17%	Ellery Hollingsworth; 5,251; 14.68%		Walter Aolari (CAP); 336 0.94% Dora Stewart (Comm.); 165 0.46%	Tom Wappel
Willowdale	Jim Peterson; 27,038; 61.27%	Kevyn Nightingale; 7,411; 16.79%	Yvonne Bobb; 2,404; 5.45%	Chungsen Leung; 7,134; 16.17%	Roger Carter; 145; 0.33%		Jim Peterson
York Centre	Art Eggleton; 24,788; 71.09%	Jeffrey Dorfman; 4,615; 13.24%	Maurice Coulter; 2,109; 6.05%	Mark Tweyman; 2,518; 7.22%	Diane Johnston; 142; 0.41%	Christopher Black (Comm.); 163 0.47% Constantine Kritsonis (Green); 532 1.53%	Art Eggleton
York West	Judy Sgro; 19,768; 77.28%	Munish Chandra; 2,734; 10.69%	Julia McCrea; 2,365; 9.25%		Amarjit Dhillon; 175; 0.68%	G. Marcello Marchetti (Mar.); 539; 2.11%	Judy Sgro

=== 1997 ===
==== Party rankings ====
Parties	1st	2nd	3rd	4th
Liberal	21	1	0	0
Independent	1	0	0	0
Progressive Conservative	0	10	8	4
Reform	0	3	12	6
New Democratic	0	8	3	11

Electoral district	Candidates						Incumbent
Electoral district	Liberal	Reform	NDP	PC	Green	Other	Incumbent
Beaches—East York	Maria Minna; 21,844	Gary Miller; 6,534	Mel Watkins; 10,730	Jack Simpson; 5,611	John Scheer; 589	264	Maria Minna; Beaches—Woodbine
Broadview—Greenwood	Dennis Mills; 21,108	Brian Higgins; 3,247	Jack Layton; 13,903	Dianne Garrels; 3,238	Karen McCarthy; 426	501	Dennis Mills
Davenport	Charles Caccia; 17,195	No candidate	Chris Masterson; 4,807	Adele Pereira; 2,628	Richard Procter; 551	927	Charles Caccia
Don Valley West	John Godfrey; 26,209	Jonathan Silbert; 4,669	Richard Tiller; 2,922	Joanne Flint; 15,046	Dan King; 378	277	John Godfrey
Eglinton—Lawrence	Joe Volpe; 25,985	Charles Van Tuinen; 3,547	Sam Savona; 3,955	David Rotenberg; 9,977	No candidate	397	Joe Volpe
Parkdale—High Park	Sarmite Bulte; 20,692	Michael Jakubcak; 5,891	Paul Schmidt; 8,762	Jilian Saweczko; 5,926	Laura Weinberg; 696	902	Jesse Flis
St. Paul's	Carolyn Bennett; 26,389	Francis Floszmann; 3,564	Michael Halewood; 6,028	Peter Atkins; 11,520	Don Roebuck; 597	538	Barry Campbell
Toronto Centre—Rosedale	Bill Graham; 22,945	John Stewart; 3,646	David Macdonald; 9,597	Stephen Probyn; 8,993	Jim Harris; 577	884	Bill Graham; Rosedale
Trinity—Spadina	Tony Ianno; 18,215	Nolan Young; 1,649	Olivia Chow; 16,413	Danielle Wai Mascall; 2,793	Sat Singh Khalsa; 392	752	Tony Ianno
York South—Weston	Judy Sgro; 12,732	Kathleen Crone; 2,363	Odoardo Di Santo; 3,552	Jan Harnett; 1,925	Shelly Lipsey; 171	John Nunziata; 17,163	John Nunziata (Note: Elected as a Liberal MP in 1993, resigned from Liberal caucus in April 1996 following his vote against the 1996 Canadian federal budget.)
York South—Weston	Judy Sgro; 12,732	Kathleen Crone; 2,363	Odoardo Di Santo; 3,552	Jan Harnett; 1,925	Shelly Lipsey; 171	210	John Nunziata

Electoral district	Candidates					Incumbent
Electoral district	Liberal	Reform	NDP	PC	Other	Incumbent
Don Valley East	David Collenette; 25,394	John Pope; 5,167	Shodja Ziaian; 2,981	Denzil Minnan-Wong; 8,610	746	David Collenette
Etobicoke Centre	Allan Rock; 27,345	Jason Beyak; 8,638	Matthew Bonk; 2,661	Alida Leistra; 11,023	456	Allan Rock
Etobicoke North	Roy Cullen; 22,236	Marco Luciani; 5,597	Carmela Sasso; 3,350	Sam Basran; 4,276	498	Roy Cullen (Note: Elected in a 1996 by-election after his Liberal predecessor, Roy MacLaren, resigned to become High Commissioner for Canada in the United Kingdom.)
Etobicoke—Lakeshore	Jean Augustine; 21,180	Robert Beard; 8,697	Karen Ridley; 4,085	Charles Donley; 10,509	1,357	Jean Augustine
Scarborough Centre	John Cannis; 25,185	Bill Settatree; 8,106	Chris Stewart; 3,619	Brian Shedden; 6,976		John Cannis
Scarborough East	John McKay; 23,065	Calvin Henry-Cotnam; 7,011	Bob Frankford; 3,330	D'Arcy Keene; 8,297	748	Douglas Peters
Scarborough Southwest	Tom Wappel; 20,675	Tom Ambas; 7,918	Dave Gracey; 4,345	Brian Mccutcheon; 5,294	482	Tom Wappel; Scarborough West
Scarborough—Agincourt	Jim Karygiannis; 25,995	Edward Lee; 4,291	Doug Hum; 2,512	Rick Perkins; 7,115		Jim Karygiannis
Scarborough—Rouge River	Derek Lee; 28,636	Ronald Bounds; 3,102	Pedram Moallemian; 1,874	Joe Li; 4,364	309	Derek Lee
Willowdale	Jim Peterson; 27,311	Peter Cobbold; 6,007	Mikael Swayze; 2,833	Norm Gardner; 10,043	534	Jim Peterson
York Centre	Art Eggleton; 27,864	Anthony Chol; 2,876	Mark Berardo; 3,618	Anthony Figliano; 3,323	985	Art Eggleton
York West	Sergio Marchi; 21,254	Ken Freeman; 2,598	Lombe Chinkangala; 2,853	Richard Donovan; 2,165		Sergio Marchi

=== 1993 ===
==== Party rankings ====
Parties	1st	2nd	3rd	4th
Liberal	23	0	0	0
Reform	0	10	12	1
Progressive Conservative	0	9	11	3
New Democratic	0	4	0	19

Electoral district	Candidates						Incumbent
Electoral district	Liberal	Reform	NDP	PC	Green	Other	Incumbent
Beaches—Woodbine	Maria Minna; 17,639	Hugh Prendergast; 6,844	Neil Young; 8,037	Denise Cole; 4,316	Leanne Haze; 335	6,135	Neil Young
Broadview—Greenwood	Dennis Mills; 23,558	Frank Meyers; 4,356	Lynn Mcdonald; 5,381	John Papadakis; 3,601	No candidate	1,679	Dennis Mills
Davenport	Charles Caccia; 20,217	Michael Jakubcak; 2,139	John Doherty; 2,513	Margaret Samuel; 1,255	Sat K. Singh Khalsa; 254	1,024	Charles Caccia
Don Valley West	John Godfrey; 25,874	Julian Pope; 7,921	Leonard Swartz; 1,405	John Bosley; 15,111	Dan King; 303	1,368	John Bosley
Eglinton—Lawrence	Joe Volpe; 28,634	Charles C. Van Tuinen; 4,347	Gael Hepworth; 2,091	Marc Monson; 4,262	No candidate	646	Joe Volpe
Parkdale—High Park	Jesse Flis; 22,358	Lee Primeau; 6,647	David Miller; 3,855	Don Baker; 5,668	Richard Roy; 430	2,173	Jesse Flis
Rosedale	Bill Graham; 27,707	Daniel Jovkovic; 7,048	Jack Layton; 5,937	David MacDonald; 12,018	Leslie Hunter; 479	2,248	David MacDonald
St. Paul's	Barry Campbell; 27,775	Paul Chaplin; 5,727	David Jacobs; 2,641	Isabel Bassett; 12,499	Jim Harris; 481	2,028	Barbara McDougall
Trinity—Spadina	Tony Ianno; 20,472	Peter Loftus; 3,143	Winnie Ng; 10,972	Lee Monaco; 3,242	Chris Lea; 613	1,735	Dan Heap
York South—Weston	John Nunziata; 25,150	Kathleen Crone; 5,313	Sil Salvaterra; 1,971	Tony Figliano; 2,508	No candidate	925	John Nunziata

Electoral district	Candidates					Incumbent
Electoral district	Liberal	Reform	PC	NDP	Other	Incumbent
Don Valley East	David Collenette; 21,630	Gordon E. Honsey; 6,819	Alan Redway; 9,334	Janice Waud Loper; 1,540	958	Alan Redway
Don Valley North	Sarkis Assadourian; 22,504	Peter Cobbold; 6,068	Barbara Greene; 7,238	David Lu; 1,395	388	Barbara Greene
Etobicoke Centre	Allan Rock; 25,739	Charles Mcleod; 10,485	Charles Donley; 9,242	Udayan Rege; 1,039	855	Michael Wilson
Etobicoke North	Roy MacLaren; 28,119	Joe Peschisolido; 9,558	Jane Maclaren; 4,936	Carmela Sasso; 1,849	1,457	Roy MacLaren
Etobicoke—Lakeshore	Jean Augustine; 19,458	Ken Anstruther; 8,673	Patrick Boyer; 14,306	Karen Ridley; 2,316	1,458	Patrick Boyer
Scarborough Centre	John Cannis; 21,084	John Pope; 8,415	Pauline Browes; 8,154	Guy Hunter; 1,599	906	Pauline Browes
Scarborough East	Douglas Peters; 20,041	Randall Flint; 10,301	D'Arcy Keene; 6,598	Doug Ottenbreit; 1,524	1,240	Robert Hicks
Scarborough West	Tom Wappel; 21,335	Aubrey Millard; 8,314	Reg Stackhouse; 5,664	Steve Thomas; 2,771	1,106	Tom Wappel
Scarborough—Agincourt	Jim Karygiannis; 24,710	Cyril Gibb; 6,022	Ben Eng; 8,802	Joe José Perez; 942	897	Jim Karygiannis
Scarborough—Rouge River	Derek Lee; 33,867	Les Saunders; 8,596	Paul Ng; 6,014	Orrin O. Benn; 1,425	1,306	Derek Lee
Willowdale	Jim Peterson; 28,622	Gerry Welbourn; 7,108	John Martin Oostrom; 7,843	Mary Maron; 1,687	1,460	Jim Peterson
York Centre	Art Eggleton; 27,128	John Beck; 2,140	George Tsiolis; 2,684	Israel Ellis; 1,559	5,440	Bob Kaplan
York West	Sergio Marchi; 25,396	Bruce A. Castleman; 3,385	Marguerite Bebluk; 1,506	Rosanne Giulietti; 1,074	452	Sergio Marchi

=== 1988 ===
==== Party rankings ====
Parties	1st	2nd	3rd	Total
Liberal	12	10	0	22
Progressive Conservative	9	9	5	23
New Democratic	2	4	17	23

==== Seats won/lost by party ====
Party	1984	Gain from (loss to)						1988
Party	1984	Lib.		PC		NDP		1988
Liberal	6	—		+5	0	+1	(1)	12 (Note: The new seat of Scarborough—Rouge River was won by the Liberals.)
Progressive Conservative	14	0	(5)	—		0	0	9
New Democratic	3	+1	(1)	0	0	—		2 (Note: The merged seat of Trinity—Spadina was retained by the NDP.)

Electoral district	Candidates				Incumbent
Electoral district	PC	Liberal	NDP	Other	Incumbent
Beaches—Woodbine	Jim O'Malley; 13,107	Terry Kelly; 14,900	Neil Young; 15,760	1,046	Neil Young; Beaches
Broadview—Greenwood	Wayne Allan Shillinglaw; 9,112	Dennis Mills; 15,808	Lynn McDonald; 14,616	1,107	Lynn McDonald
Davenport	Alex Franco; 5,179	Charles Caccia; 16,436	Anna Menozzi; 5,243	1,040	Charles Caccia
Don Valley West	John Bosley; 27,683	Liz Yorke; 19,097	Ian Cameron; 4,307	809	John Bosley
Eglinton—Lawrence	Anthony Chisholm Abbott; 12,400	Joe Volpe; 20,446	Vittoria Levi; 6,241	991	Roland de Corneille
Parkdale—High Park	Andrew Witer; 16,418	Jesse Flis; 19,614	Abby Pollonetsky; 8,002	1,102	Andrew Witer
Rosedale	David MacDonald; 22,704	Bill Graham; 22,624	Doug Wilson; 8,266	1,299	David Crombie
St. Paul's	Barbara McDougall; 25,206	Aideen Nicholson; 21,655	Diane Bull; 5,303	865	Barbara McDougall
Trinity—Spadina	Joe Pimentel; 8,618	Tony Ianno; 15,082	Dan Heap; 15,565	1,114	Aideen Nicholson; Trinity
Trinity—Spadina	Joe Pimentel; 8,618	Tony Ianno; 15,082	Dan Heap; 15,565	1,114	Merged districts
Trinity—Spadina	Joe Pimentel; 8,618	Tony Ianno; 15,082	Dan Heap; 15,565	1,114	Dan Heap; Spadina
York South—Weston	Carlo Testa; 8,488	John Nunziata; 21,111	Steve Krashinsky; 9,095	610	John Nunziata

Electoral district	Candidates				Incumbent
Electoral district	PC	Liberal	NDP	Other	Incumbent
Don Valley East	Alan Redway; 18,719	Yasmin Ratansi; 15,881	Brant Loper; 6,310	964	Alan Redway; York East
Don Valley North	Barbara Greene; 17,551	Sarkis Assadourian; 16,947	Anton Kuerti; 4,777	1,137	Bill Attewell; Don Valley East
Etobicoke Centre	Michael Wilson; 24,338	Mary Schwass; 20,342	Phil Jones; 4,815	773	Michael Wilson
Etobicoke North	Robert Pennock; 17,261	Roy MacLaren; 22,618	Ted Humphreys; 8,645	1,365	Robert Pennock
Etobicoke—Lakeshore	Patrick Boyer; 20,405		Judy Brandow; 19,609	4,310	Patrick Boyer
Scarborough Centre	Pauline Browes; 17,247	Odysseus Katsaitis; 16,846	Garth C. Dee; 8,004	342	Pauline Browes
Scarborough East	Robert Hicks; 18,149	Betty Fevreau; 16,337	Mary Cook; 6,866	577	Robert Hicks
Scarborough West	Reg Stackhouse; 14,923	Tom Wappel; 15,363	Dave Gracey; 11,000	459	Reg Stackhouse
Scarborough—Agincourt	Paul McCrossan; 18,601	Jim Karygiannis; 19,459	Susie Vallance; 5,082	770	Paul McCrossan; York—Scarborough
Scarborough—Rouge River	Doug Boswell; 18,171	Derek Lee; 22,767	Raymond Cho; 6,589	799	New district
Willowdale	John Oostrom; 22,347	Jim Peterson; 24,230	Anne Adelson; 4,517	415	John Oostrom
York Centre	Rocco Sebastiano; 9,248	Bob Kaplan; 24,962	Cathy Mele; 6,350	683	Bob Kaplan
York West	Elizabeth Smith; 6,368	Sergio Marchi; 19,936	Alice Lambrinos; 6,088	1,032	Sergio Marchi
