= Option Canada (political party) =

Former political party in Quebec, Canada

Option Canada was a short-lived political party in Quebec, Canada, in the early 1990s. Gaining media attention in 1991 for its proposal to create an 11th province in southwestern Quebec, it did not maintain significant public support and never registered as an official political party before dissolving in 1993.

The Party was mainly the project of one person, insurance salesman Greg Gogan. He withdrew from a Master's Degree program at Concordia University in Soviet history to establish Option Canada as a federal party representing Quebec's linguistic minorities.

Option Canada was founded in response to Quebec's language tensions of the early 1990s. Its stated purpose was to create an eleventh Canadian province, carved out of the predominantly English-speaking regions of southwestern Quebec. Gogan, the party's leader, argued that English-speaking Quebecers had legitimate grievances against the "restrictive language policies [of] the provincial government", and would not tolerate being "second-class citizens in a first-class country". Gogan stated that he would abandon his proposal for an eleventh province if the Canadian Constitution were amended to remove the "notwithstanding clause", which allows governments to override binding decisions by the courts. This clause had been used in Quebec to perpetuate restrictions on English-language advertising.

Gogan, who was thirty-eight years old at the time, was able to attract national attention for his movement despite having no prior political experience. In June 1991, he announced that his party had signed up 2,000 members since its founding The party had well-attended introductory meetings in several anglophone communities, and one party event in Westmount was described in the media as "revival meeting for disfranchised West Island anglophones". Gogan emphasized that the party was not limited to anglophones, and predicted that half of its membership would be francophone within a year. The party was unable to maintain its early support base, however, and largely vanished from the public eye after the summer of 1991.

Option Canada dissolved in 1993, although the idea of removing federalist or anglophone areas from Quebec was continued by pro-Partition groups, such as the Equality Party. Gogan subsequently moved to Ontario and became a candidate for Mel Hurtig's National Party of Canada in the 1993 federal election in the riding of Ontario riding of Scarborough West, finishing fifth, and then a candidate for the New Democratic Party in Scarborough Centre, Ontario for the 2004 federal election, finishing third. He joined, then quit, the Liberal Party of Canada in 2007.

== See also ==
- Clarity Act
- Quebec Sovereignty
