= John Cannis =

Canadian politician (born 1951)

Member of Parliament for Scarborough Centre
- In office October 25, 1993 – May 2, 2011
- Preceded by: Pauline Browes
- Succeeded by: Roxanne James

Personal details
- Born: November 4, 1951 (age 74) Kalymnos, Greece
- Party: Liberal
- Spouse: Mary Cannis
- Children: 3
- Profession: Human Resources Consultant

John Cannis (Greek: Γιάννης Κάννης; born November 4, 1951) is a Canadian politician. He was a former member of the House of Commons of Canada.

== Background ==
Born in Kalymnos, Greece, Cannis was raised and educated in Toronto, Ontario. A successful entrepreneur for 18 years, Cannis owned a Toronto-based international executive search firm and was a member in good standing of Association of Professional Placement Agencies and Consultants. He also served as a computer and human resource consultant.

Cannis and his wife of more than 40 years, Mary, have three children; Irene (Tony), Paul (Christina), Daniel and four grandchildren.

== Politics ==
Cannis ran as the Liberal candidate in the 1993 election in the riding of Scarborough Centre and was elected as a Member of Parliament. He continued to serve for 18 years before his defeat by Conservative Roxanne James in 2011.

From 1999 to 2001, Cannis served as the Parliamentary Secretary to the Minister of Industry. As Parliamentary Secretary, he successfully guided four pieces of legislation through the House of Commons and committee stages; specifically, the Privacy Act, the Space Agency Act, the Canadian Tourism Commission Act and the Patent Act.

Notable committee appointments included Vice-Chair of the Standing Committee on National Defence, Chair of the Standing Committee on National Defence and Veterans Affairs, Chair of the Subcommittee on International Trade, Trade Disputes and Investment (SINT) of the Standing Committee on Foreign Affairs and International Trade (FAAE) and as Vice-Chair on the Standing Committee on Transport.

In 2004, when the Khadr family returned to Canada, they were met by a loud wave of public sentiment in favour of revoking their citizenship and deporting them. Cannis, as the Member of Parliament for their region, called for the entire family to be charged under the Canadian Anti-Terrorism Act for "aiding a terrorist organization with which Canada is at war". Prime Minister Paul Martin responded by saying that the Khadrs "have a right to their own opinions".

Cannis ran as an independent candidate in Scarborough Centre in the 2019 Canadian federal election and received 5.42% of the vote.

== Electoral record ==
2019 Canadian federal election: Scarborough Centre
Party	Candidate	Votes	%	±%	Expenditures
Liberal	Salma Zahid	25,695	55.3	+4.80	$100,475.79
Conservative	Irshad Chaudhry	10,387	22.3	-10.40	$88,298.94
New Democratic	Faiz Kamal	5,452	11.7	+0.10	$11,622.00
Independent	John Cannis	2,524	5.4		$49,981.60
Green	Dordana Hakimzadah	1,336	2.9	+0.80	none listed
People's	Jeremiah Vijeyaratnam	1,162	2.5		none listed
Total valid votes/expense limit		46,556	100.0		
Total rejected ballots		638			
Turnout		47,194	62.4		
Eligible voters		75,662			
Liberal hold		Swing		+7.60	
Source: Elections Canada

2011 Canadian federal election: Scarborough Centre
Party	Candidate	Votes	%	±%	Expenditures
Conservative	Roxanne James	13,498	35.55	+5.45	
Liberal	John Cannis	12,028	31.68	-16.99	
New Democratic	Natalie Hundt	11,443	30.14	+14.39	
Green	Ella Ng	998	2.63	-2.83	
Total valid votes/expense limit		37,967	100.00	+3.10	
Total rejected ballots		217	0.57	-0.07	
Turnout		38,184	54.34	+2.21	
Eligible voters		70,274		-1.15	
Source(s) Elections Canada "Official Voting Results — Forty-First General Election 2011 — Voting results by electoral district". "Official Voting Results — Forty-First General Election 2011 — List of candidates by electoral district and individual results".

2008 Canadian federal election: Scarborough Centre
Party	Candidate	Votes	%	±%	Expenditures
Liberal	John Cannis	17,927	48.67	-6.7	$61,436
Conservative	Roxanne James	11,088	30.10	+2.8	$74,654
New Democratic	Natalie Hundt	5,801	15.75	+1.8	$1,449
Green	Ella Ng	2,011	5.46	+2.2	$1,784
Total valid votes/Expense limit		36,827	100.00	$81,313	
Total rejected ballots		235	0.63		
Turnout		37,062	52.13		

2006 Canadian federal election: Scarborough Centre
Party	Candidate	Votes	%	±%
Liberal	John Cannis	23,332	55.4	+1.7
Conservative	Roxanne James	11,522	27.3	+5.3
New Democratic	Dorothy Laxton	5,885	14.0	-1.9
Green	Andrew Strachan	1,396	3.3	+0.6
Total valid votes		42,135	100.0	

2004 Canadian federal election: Scarborough Centre
Party	Candidate	Votes	%	±%
Liberal	John Cannis	20,740	53.7	-13.8
Conservative	John Mihtis	8,515	22.0	-0.2
New Democratic	Greg Gogan	6,156	15.9	+8.0
Green	Greg Bonser	1,045	2.7	
Communist	Dorothy Sauras	152	0.3	
Total valid votes		36,608	100.0	

Note: Conservative vote is compared to the total of the Canadian Alliance vote and Progressive Conservative vote in 2000 election.

2000 Canadian federal election: Scarborough Centre
Party	Candidate	Votes	%	±%
Liberal	John Cannis	26,969	67.5	+10.1
Alliance	Bill Settatree	8,849	22.2	+3.7
New Democratic	Ali Mallah	3,171	7.9	-0.3
Marijuana	Paul Coulbeck	959	2.4	
Total valid votes		39,948	100.0	

Note: Canadian Alliance vote is compared to the Reform vote in 1997 election.

1997 Canadian federal election: Scarborough Centre
Party	Candidate	Votes	%	±%
Liberal	John Cannis	25,185	57.4	+4.9
Reform	Bill Settatree	8,106	18.5	-2.2
Progressive Conservative	Brian Shedden	6,976	15.9	-4.6
New Democratic	Chris Stewart	3,619	8.2	+4.2
Total valid votes		43,886	100.0	

1993 Canadian federal election: Scarborough Centre
Party	Candidate	Votes	%	Expenditures
Liberal	John Cannis	21,084	52.50	$ 48,715
Reform	John Pope	8,415	20.95	16,324
Progressive Conservative	Pauline Browes	8,154	20.30	43,354
New Democratic	Guy Hunter	1,599	3.98	24,751
National	Jean Schilling	320	0.80	1,152
Natural Law	David Gordon	190	0.47	0
Independent	Steven Lam	184	0.46	7,341
Libertarian	George Dance	153	0.38	0
Marxist–Leninist	France Tremblay	38	0.09	105
Abolitionist	Denis A. Mazerolle	21	0.05	0
Total valid votes		40,158	100.00	
Total rejected ballots		359	0.89	
Turnout		40,517	68.17	
Eligible voters		59,431		
Source(s) Thirty-fifth General Election, 1993: Official Voting Results, Chief Electoral Officer (Canada) "Official contributions and expenses". Elections Canada.
