= Salma Zahid =

Canadian politician (born 1970)

Salma Zahid MP
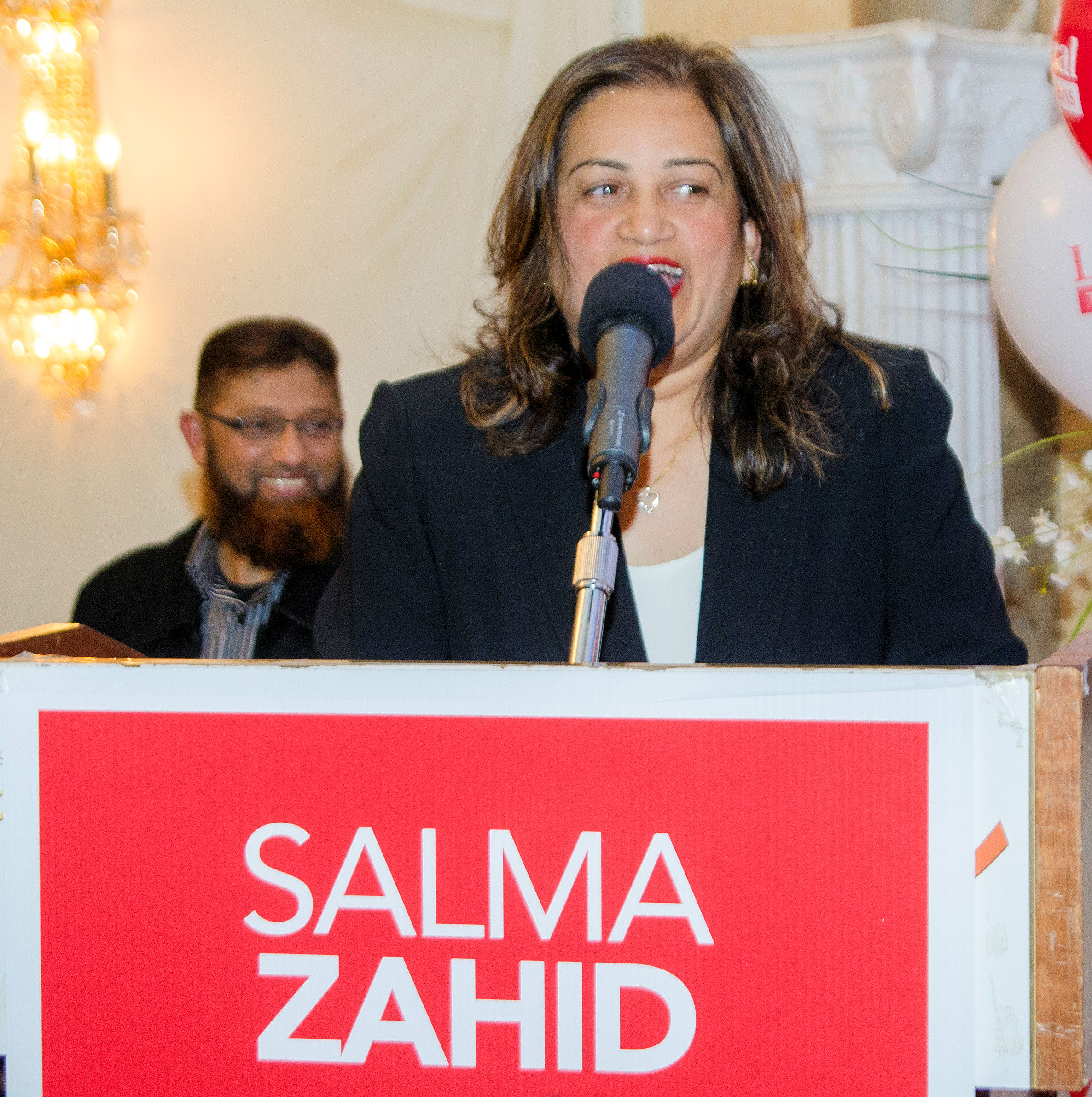
- Image of Salma Zahid delivering victory speech on election night October 19, 2015

Member of Parliament for Scarborough Centre—Don Valley East Scarborough Centre (2015–2025)
- Incumbent
- Assumed office October 19, 2015
- Preceded by: Roxanne James

Personal details
- Born: May 26, 1970 (age 56) Coventry, England, United Kingdom
- Citizenship: Canada; Pakistan; United Kingdom
- Party: Liberal
- Education: University of London; Quaid-i-Azam University
- Awards: Queen Elizabeth II Diamond Jubilee Medal

Salma Zahid MP (born May 26, 1970) is a Canadian politician, who was elected as a member of Parliament in the House of Commons of Canada to represent the federal riding of Scarborough Centre in the 2015 Canadian federal election.

== Early life and career ==
Zahid was born in Coventry, England. She holds a master's degree in educational management and administration from the University of London’s Institute of Education, and an MBA from Quaid-i-Azam University in Pakistan. She is a Pakistani Canadian, mother of two, and has resided in Scarborough since 2000. She is a recipient of the Queen Elizabeth II Diamond Jubilee Medal. Zahid was a community organizer and worked for the Government of Ontario in multiple positions before running in the election.

== Political career ==
Zahid was elected in the 2015 Canadian federal election as a member of Parliament for Scarborough Centre. She succeeded Conservative MP Roxanne James. While in the 42nd Parliament, Zahid had the role of Vice-Chair for the Standing Committee on the Status of Women, where she was a spokesperson for racialized women.

In February 2018, Zahid announced that she was taking medical leave to treat her Stage 4 Non-Hodgkin lymphoma. This was used by the Scarborough Centre Conservative Party of Canada Riding Association Vice President to sell memberships via robocall. While recovering from chemotherapy treatment, Zahid wore a hijab for personal reasons, saying that she had grown closer to her Islamic faith while facing cancer. In May 2018, she became the first MP to wear a hijab in the House of Commons. Zahid received some negative reactions to the hijab, to which she responded by highlighting the personal nature of her decision. In July 2018, after completing six rounds of chemotherapy, Zahid was cancer-free and returned to her job.

Zahid was re-nominated to run in Scarborough Centre for the Liberals in the 2019 Canadian federal election.

As chair of the Canada-Palestine Parliamentary Friendship Group, Zahid received criticism after a publisher of Holocaust denialism attended a Palestinian solidarity event the group hosted in November 2022. In response, she condemned the man's views and denied involvement in inviting him. She has also received criticism for her position on the Gaza war, which stepped out of longstanding tradition of Canadian and Liberal Party MPs' political support for the State of Israel. In January 2024, Zahid called on her colleagues in the House of Commons to support South Africa's application to prosecute Israel for genocide.

In August 2026, it was announced that police were investigating a suspected arson at Zahid's home after her car and another vehicle were set on fire. Both vehicles were destroyed.

== Election results ==
2025 Canadian federal election: Scarborough Centre—Don Valley East
** Preliminary results — Not yet official **
Party	Candidate	Votes	%	±%	Expenditures
Liberal	Salma Zahid	27,539	57.21	+0.89	
Conservative	Belent Mathew	18,353	38.13	+12.81	
New Democratic	Alyson Koa	1,583	3.29	–10.46	
People's	Peter Koubakis	660	1.37	–2.89	
Total valid votes/expense limit					
Total rejected ballots					
Turnout		48,135	61.93		
Eligible voters		77,727			
Liberal notional hold		Swing		–5.96	
Source: Elections Canada

2021 Canadian federal election
Party	Candidate	Votes	%	±%	Expenditures
Liberal	Salma Zahid	23,128	57.6	+2.3	$104,544.73
Conservative	Malcolm Ponnayan	9,819	24.4	+2.1	$35,013.30
New Democratic	Faiz Kamal	5,479	13.6	+1.9	$8,952.20
People's	Petru Rozoveanu	1,472	3.7	+1.2	$0.00
National Citizens Alliance	Aylwin T. Mathew	263	0.7	N/A	$0.00
Total valid votes/expense limit		40,161	99.0	–	$108,279.65
Total rejected ballots		425	1.0		
Turnout		40,586	54.8		
Eligible voters		74,078			
Liberal hold		Swing		+0.1	
Source: Elections Canada

2019 Canadian federal election: Scarborough Centre
Party	Candidate	Votes	%	±%	Expenditures
Liberal	Salma Zahid	25,695	55.3	+4.80	$100,475.79
Conservative	Irshad Chaudhry	10,387	22.3	-10.40	$88,298.94
New Democratic	Faiz Kamal	5,452	11.7	+0.10	$11,622.00
Independent	John Cannis	2,524	5.4		$49,981.60
Green	Dordana Hakimzadah	1,336	2.9	+0.80	none listed
People's	Jeremiah Vijeyaratnam	1,162	2.5		none listed
Total valid votes/expense limit		46,556	100.0		
Total rejected ballots		638			
Turnout		47,194	62.4		
Eligible voters		75,662			
Liberal hold		Swing		+7.60	
Source: Elections Canada

2015 Canadian federal election: Scarborough Centre
Party	Candidate	Votes	%	±%	Expenditures
Liberal	Salma Zahid	22,753	50.5	+18.61	$111,259.09
Conservative	Roxanne James	14,705	32.7	-2.18	$96,481.13
New Democratic	Alex Wilson	5,227	11.6	-19.06	$24,264.68
Libertarian	Katerina Androutsos	1,384	3.1		$1,452.03
Green	Lindsay Thompson	960	2.1	-0.47	$1,627.92
Total valid votes/expense limit		45,029	100.00	+22.33	$203,985.80
Total rejected ballots		407	0.90	+0.33	
Turnout		45,436	64.36	+10.02	
Eligible voters		70,594		+0.46	
Liberal gain from Conservative		Swing		+10.39%	
Source(s) "Election Night Results (Validated by Returning Officer)". Elections Canada. "Elections Canada – Preliminary Election Expenses Limits for Candidates".
