= Scarborough Centre—Don Valley East =

Federal electoral district in Ontario, Canada

Ontario electoral district
- Interactive map of riding boundaries from the 2025 federal election

Federal electoral district
- Legislature: House of Commons
MP
Salma Zahid
Liberal
- District created: 2023
- First contested: 2025

Demographics
- Population (2021): 111,377
- Electors (2025): 76,345
- Census division: Toronto
- Census subdivision: Toronto (part)

Scarborough Centre—Don Valley East (French: Scarborough-Centre–Don Valley-Est) is a federal electoral district in Ontario, Canada. It came into effect upon the call of the 2025 Canadian federal election.

== Geography ==
Under the 2022 Canadian federal electoral redistribution the riding is created out of a merger of Scarborough Centre and Don Valley East.

- Loses all of Don Valley East west of the Don River to Don Valley North and Don Valley West
- Loses Eglinton East, Bendale South and Bendale-Glen Andrew neighbourhoods of Scarborough Centre to Scarborough—Woburn

== Demographics ==
According to the 2021 Canadian census

Languages: 52.7% English, 5.1% Tagalog, 3.8% Arabic, 3.6% Tamil, 2.9% Mandarin, 2.6% Greek, 2.5% Farsi, 2.4% Cantonese, 2.1% Spanish, 1.8% French, 1.8% Urdu, 1.7% Bengali, 1.1% Gujarati

Religions: 51.2% Christian (23.2% Catholic, 7.8% Christian Orthodox, 2.2% Anglican, 1.8% United Church, 1.5% Pentecostal, 1.1% Baptist, 1.0% Presbyterian, 12.7% Other), 20.8% No religion, 16.3% Muslim, 8.7% Hindu, 1.5% Buddhist

Median income: $35,200 (2020)

Average income: $45,440 (2020)

Panethnic groups in Scarborough Centre—Don Valley East (2021)
Panethnic group	2021	
Panethnic group	Pop.	%
European (Note: Statistic includes all persons that did not make up part of a visible minority or an indigenous identity.)	36,725	33.3%
South Asian	21,480	19.48%
Southeast Asian (Note: Statistic includes total responses of "Filipino" and "Southeast Asian" under visible minority section on census.)	13,100	11.88%
African	11,155	10.12%
East Asian (Note: Statistic includes total responses of "Chinese", "Korean", and "Japanese" under visible minority section on census.)	9,705	8.8%
Middle Eastern (Note: Statistic includes total responses of "West Asian" and "Arab" under visible minority section on census.)	9,230	8.37%
Latin American	2,590	2.35%
Indigenous	855	0.78%
Other/multiracial (Note: Statistic includes total responses of "Visible minority, n.i.e." and "Multiple visible minorities" under visible minority section on census.)	5,425	4.92%
Total responses	110,270	99.01%
Total population	111,375	100%
Notes: Totals greater than 100% due to multiple origin responses. Demographics based on 2022 Canadian federal electoral redistribution riding boundaries.

== History ==
Parliament	Years	Member	Party
Scarborough Centre—Don Valley East; Riding created from Don Valley East and Scarborough Centre
45th	2025–present	Salma Zahid	Liberal

== Election results ==
2025 Canadian federal election
** Preliminary results — Not yet official **
Party	Candidate	Votes	%	±%	Expenditures
Liberal	Salma Zahid	27,539	57.21	+0.89	
Conservative	Belent Mathew	18,353	38.13	+12.81	
New Democratic	Alyson Koa	1,583	3.29	–10.46	
People's	Peter Koubakis	660	1.37	–2.89	
Total valid votes/expense limit					
Total rejected ballots					
Turnout		48,135	61.93		
Eligible voters		77,727			
Liberal notional hold		Swing		–5.96	
Source: Elections Canada

2021 federal election redistributed results
Party	Vote	%
Liberal	23,381	56.32
Conservative	10,513	25.32
New Democratic	5,707	13.75
People's	1,768	4.26
Others	149	0.36

== See also ==
- List of Canadian electoral districts
