= Roxanne James =

Canadian politician

Member of Parliament for Scarborough Centre
- In office May 2, 2011 – August 4, 2015
- Preceded by: John Cannis
- Succeeded by: Salma Zahid

Personal details
- Born: 1966 (age 59–60) Scarborough, Ontario, Canada
- Party: Conservative
- Profession: Real estate agent, systems analyst

Roxanne L. James (born 1966) is a Canadian politician who was elected to the House of Commons of Canada in the 2011 election. She represented the electoral district of Scarborough Centre as a member of the Conservative Party, until her defeat in the 42nd federal election on October 19, 2015, which saw her lose her seat to the Liberal Party candidate Salma Zahid.

Her past political history included working on the Defend Marriage campaign, which sought to revoke same-sex couples' right to marry.

== Electoral record ==
2015 Canadian federal election: Scarborough Centre
Party	Candidate	Votes	%	±%	Expenditures
Liberal	Salma Zahid	22,753	50.5	+18.61	$111,259.09
Conservative	Roxanne James	14,705	32.7	-2.18	$96,481.13
New Democratic	Alex Wilson	5,227	11.6	-19.06	$24,264.68
Libertarian	Katerina Androutsos	1,384	3.1		$1,452.03
Green	Lindsay Thompson	960	2.1	-0.47	$1,627.92
Total valid votes/expense limit		45,029	100.00	+22.33	$203,985.80
Total rejected ballots		407	0.90	+0.33	
Turnout		45,436	64.36	+10.02	
Eligible voters		70,594		+0.46	
Liberal gain from Conservative		Swing		+10.39%	
Source(s) "Election Night Results (Validated by Returning Officer)". Elections Canada. "Elections Canada – Preliminary Election Expenses Limits for Candidates".

2011 Canadian federal election: Scarborough Centre
Party	Candidate	Votes	%	±%	Expenditures
Conservative	Roxanne James	13,498	35.55	+5.45	
Liberal	John Cannis	12,028	31.68	-16.99	
New Democratic	Natalie Hundt	11,443	30.14	+14.39	
Green	Ella Ng	998	2.63	-2.83	
Total valid votes/expense limit		37,967	100.00	+3.10	
Total rejected ballots		217	0.57	-0.07	
Turnout		38,184	54.34	+2.21	
Eligible voters		70,274		-1.15	
Source(s) Elections Canada "Official Voting Results — Forty-First General Election 2011 — Voting results by electoral district". "Official Voting Results — Forty-First General Election 2011 — List of candidates by electoral district and individual results".

2008 Canadian federal election
Party	Candidate	Votes	%	±%	Expenditures
Liberal	John Cannis	17,927	48.67	-6.7	$61,436
Conservative	Roxanne James	11,088	30.10	+2.8	$74,654
New Democratic	Natalie Hundt	5,801	15.75	+1.8	$1,449
Green	Ella Ng	2,011	5.46	+2.2	$1,784
Total valid votes/Expense limit		36,827	100.00	-12.60	$81,313
Total rejected ballots		235	0.63		
Turnout		37,062	52.13		
Eligible voters		71,094			

2006 Canadian federal election
Party	Candidate	Votes	%	±%
Liberal	John Cannis	23,332	55.4	+1.7
Conservative	Roxanne James	11,522	27.3	+5.3
New Democratic	Dorothy Laxton	5,885	14.0	-1.9
Green	Andrew Strachan	1,396	3.3	+0.6
Total valid votes		42,135	100.0	
