= Scarborough Centre (federal electoral district) =

Federal electoral district in Ontario, Canada

Ontario electoral district
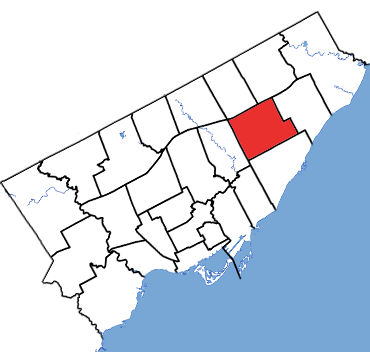
- Scarborough Centre in relation to the other Toronto ridings (2013 boundaries)
- Coordinates: 43.753°N 79.273°W

Defunct federal electoral district
- Legislature: House of Commons
- District created: 1976
- District abolished: 2023
- First contested: 1979
- Last contested: 2021
- District webpage: profile, map

Demographics
- Population (2021): 113,104
- Electors (2015): 70,145
- Area (km²): 30
- Census division: Toronto
- Census subdivision: Toronto

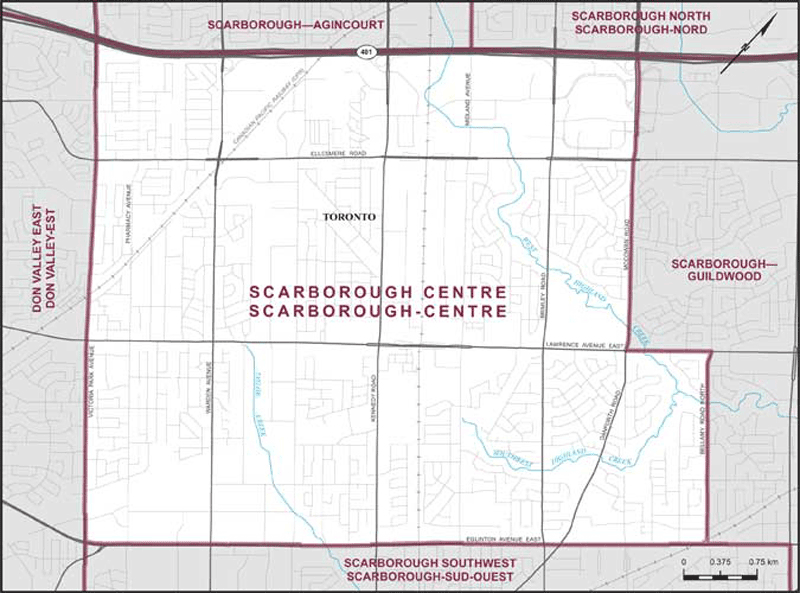
Map of Scarborough Centre

Scarborough Centre (French: Scarborough-Centre) is a former federal electoral district in Ontario, Canada, that was represented in the House of Commons of Canada from 1979 to 2025.

The riding was created in 1976 from parts of Scarborough East, Scarborough West and York—Scarborough ridings.

It consists of the part of the Scarborough district of the City of Toronto bounded:

- on the west by Victoria Park Avenue,
- on the north by Highway 401,
- on the east by McCowan Road, Lawrence Avenue East and Bellamy Road North, and
- on the south by Eglinton Avenue East.

Notable landmarks in Scarborough Centre include:

- Scarborough Civic Centre, site of east Toronto district council meetings, and adjacent Albert Campbell Square
- Scarborough Town Centre, a large shopping mall
- Scarborough Centre Line 3 station
- Scarborough General Hospital, General Division
- Scarborough Historical Museum

It was last represented in the House of Commons by Liberal MP Salma Zahid in 2025.

== Geography ==
The riding contains the neighbourhoods of Scarborough City Centre (west of McCowan Road), Bendale (west of McCowan and south of Lawrence), Eglinton East, Ionview (north of Eglinton Avenue), Golden Mile (north of Eglinton Avenue), Wexford, Maryvale, and Dorset Park.

== History ==
Scarborough Centre was created in 1976. It consisted initially of the part of the Borough of Scarborough bounded on the west by Victoria Park Avenue, on the north by Ellesmere Road, on the east by Bellamy Road North, and on the south by Eglinton Avenue East.

In 1987, it was expanded to include the part of Scarborough lying bounded by Bellamy Road North, Lawrence Avenue East, Markham Road and Eglinton Avenue East.

In 1996, it was redefined such that it was bounded:

- on the west by Victoria Park Avenue,
- on the north by a line drawn from west to east along Ellesmere Road, north along the Canadian National Railway and west along Highway 401,
- on the east by a line drawn from north to south along Highland Creek East, west along Ellesmere Road, south along Scarborough Golf Club Road, west along Lawrence Avenue East and south along Markham Road, and
- on the south by Eglinton Avenue East.

In 2003, it was given its current boundaries as described above.

This riding lost territory to Scarborough—Guildwood, and gained territory from Scarborough Southwest during the 2012 electoral redistribution.

=== Members of Parliament ===
This riding has elected the following members of Parliament:

Parliament	Years	Member	Party
Scarborough Centre; Riding created from Scarborough East, Scarborough West and York—Scarborough
31st	1979–1980	Diane Stratas	Progressive Conservative
32nd	1980–1984	Norm Kelly	Liberal
33rd	1984–1988	Pauline Browes	Progressive Conservative
34th	1988–1993	Pauline Browes	Progressive Conservative
35th	1993–1997	John Cannis	Liberal
36th	1997–2000	John Cannis	Liberal
37th	2000–2004	John Cannis	Liberal
38th	2004–2006	John Cannis	Liberal
39th	2006–2008	John Cannis	Liberal
40th	2008–2011	John Cannis	Liberal
41st	2011–2015	Roxanne James	Conservative
42nd	2015–2019	Salma Zahid	Liberal
43rd	2019–2021	Salma Zahid	Liberal
44th	2021–2025	Salma Zahid	Liberal
Riding dissolved into Scarborough Centre—Don Valley East and Scarborough—Woburn

== Demographics ==
According to the 2021 Canadian census

Ethnic groups: 28.5% South Asian, 24.8% White, 13.1% Filipino, 9.9% Black, 8.0% Chinese, 3.4% Arab, 2.7% West Asian, 1.6% Latin American, 1.2% Southeast Asian

Languages: 43.3% English, 6.6% Tamil, 6.3% Tagalog, 3.0% Mandarin, 3.0% Cantonese, 2.7% Bengali, 2.5% Arabic, 2.1% Greek, 2.1% Urdu, 1.8% Gujarati, 1.3% Spanish, 1.2% Hindi, 1.1% Dari

Religions: 48.0% Christian (23.7% Catholic, 5.7% Christian Orthodox, 1.8% Anglican, 1.5% Pentecostal, 1.3% United Church, 1.0% Baptist, 13.0% other), 17.4% Muslim, 13.9% Hindu, 1.6% Buddhist, 17.9% none

Median income: $34,000 (2020)

Average income: $41,560 (2020)

== Former boundaries ==
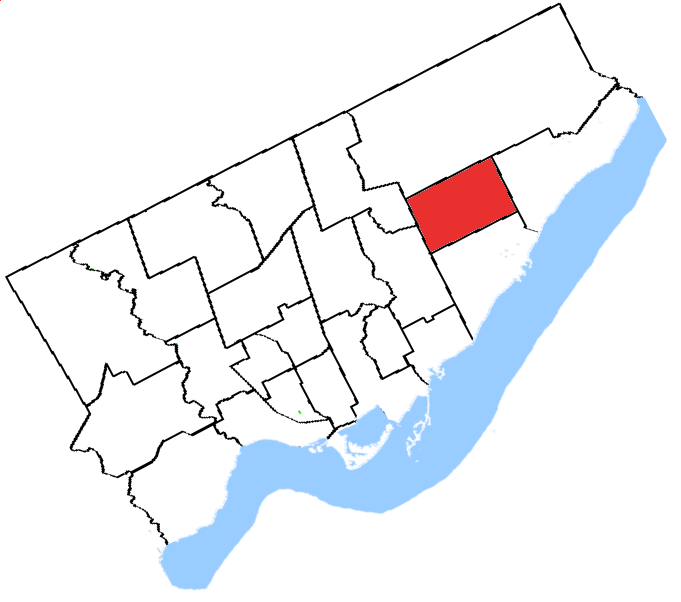
1976 to 1987

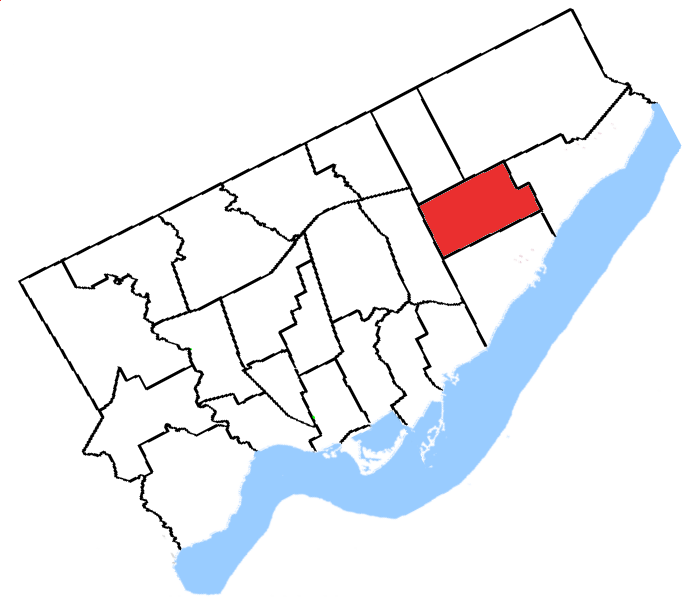
1987 to 1996

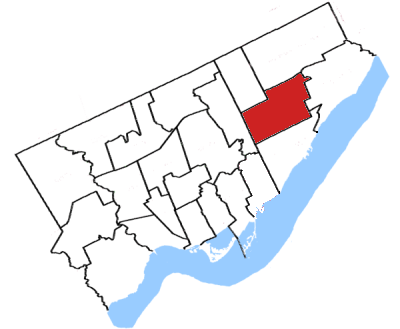
1996 to 2003

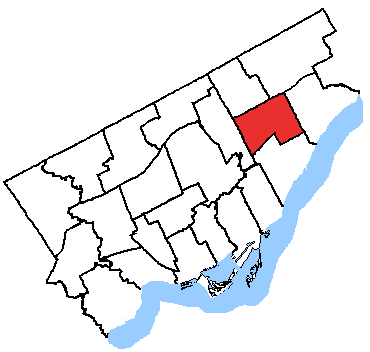
2003 to 2015

== Election results ==
Graph of election results in Scarborough—Agincourt (since 1979, parties that never received at least 2% of the vote are omitted)

2021 Canadian federal election
Party	Candidate	Votes	%	±%	Expenditures
Liberal	Salma Zahid	23,128	57.6	+2.3	$104,544.73
Conservative	Malcolm Ponnayan	9,819	24.4	+2.1	$35,013.30
New Democratic	Faiz Kamal	5,479	13.6	+1.9	$8,952.20
People's	Petru Rozoveanu	1,472	3.7	+1.2	$0.00
National Citizens Alliance	Aylwin T. Mathew	263	0.7	N/A	$0.00
Total valid votes/expense limit		40,161	99.0	–	$108,279.65
Total rejected ballots		425	1.0		
Turnout		40,586	54.8		
Eligible voters		74,078			
Liberal hold		Swing		+0.1	
Source: Elections Canada

2019 Canadian federal election
Party	Candidate	Votes	%	±%	Expenditures
Liberal	Salma Zahid	25,695	55.3	+4.80	$100,475.79
Conservative	Irshad Chaudhry	10,387	22.3	-10.40	$88,298.94
New Democratic	Faiz Kamal	5,452	11.7	+0.10	$11,622.00
Independent	John Cannis	2,524	5.4		$49,981.60
Green	Dordana Hakimzadah	1,336	2.9	+0.80	none listed
People's	Jeremiah Vijeyaratnam	1,162	2.5		none listed
Total valid votes/expense limit		46,556	100.0		
Total rejected ballots		638			
Turnout		47,194	62.4		
Eligible voters		75,662			
Liberal hold		Swing		+7.60	
Source: Elections Canada

2015 Canadian federal election
Party	Candidate	Votes	%	±%	Expenditures
Liberal	Salma Zahid	22,753	50.5	+18.61	$111,259.09
Conservative	Roxanne James	14,705	32.7	-2.18	$96,481.13
New Democratic	Alex Wilson	5,227	11.6	-19.06	$24,264.68
Libertarian	Katerina Androutsos	1,384	3.1		$1,452.03
Green	Lindsay Thompson	960	2.1	-0.47	$1,627.92
Total valid votes/expense limit		45,029	100.00	+22.33	$203,985.80
Total rejected ballots		407	0.90	+0.33	
Turnout		45,436	64.36	+10.02	
Eligible voters		70,594		+0.46	
Liberal gain from Conservative		Swing		+10.39%	
Source(s) "Election Night Results (Validated by Returning Officer)". Elections Canada. "Elections Canada – Preliminary Election Expenses Limits for Candidates".

2011 federal election redistributed results
Party	Vote	%
Conservative	12,841	34.88
Liberal	11,738	31.89
New Democratic	11,285	30.66
Green	946	2.57

2011 Canadian federal election
Party	Candidate	Votes	%	±%	Expenditures
Conservative	Roxanne James	13,498	35.55	+5.45	
Liberal	John Cannis	12,028	31.68	-16.99	
New Democratic	Natalie Hundt	11,443	30.14	+14.39	
Green	Ella Ng	998	2.63	-2.83	
Total valid votes/expense limit		37,967	100.00	+3.10	
Total rejected ballots		217	0.57	-0.07	
Turnout		38,184	54.34	+2.21	
Eligible voters		70,274		-1.15	
Source(s) Elections Canada "Official Voting Results — Forty-First General Election 2011 — Voting results by electoral district". "Official Voting Results — Forty-First General Election 2011 — List of candidates by electoral district and individual results".

2008 Canadian federal election
Party	Candidate	Votes	%	±%	Expenditures
Liberal	John Cannis	17,927	48.67	-6.7	$61,436
Conservative	Roxanne James	11,088	30.10	+2.8	$74,654
New Democratic	Natalie Hundt	5,801	15.75	+1.8	$1,449
Green	Ella Ng	2,011	5.46	+2.2	$1,784
Total valid votes/expense limit		36,827	100.00	-12.60	$81,313
Total rejected ballots		235	0.63		
Turnout		37,062	52.13		
Eligible voters		71,094			

2006 Canadian federal election
Party	Candidate	Votes	%	±%
Liberal	John Cannis	23,332	55.4	+1.7
Conservative	Roxanne James	11,522	27.3	+5.3
New Democratic	Dorothy Laxton	5,885	14.0	-1.9
Green	Andrew Strachan	1,396	3.3	+0.6
Total valid votes		42,135	100.0	

2004 Canadian federal election
Party	Candidate	Votes	%	±%
Liberal	John Cannis	20,740	53.7	-13.8
Conservative	John Mihtis	8,515	22.0	-0.2
New Democratic	Greg Gogan	6,156	15.9	+8.0
Green	Greg Bonser	1,045	2.7	
Communist	Dorothy Sauras	152	0.3	
Total valid votes		36,608	100.0	

Note: Conservative vote is compared to the total of the Canadian Alliance vote and Progressive Conservative vote in 2000 election.

2000 Canadian federal election
Party	Candidate	Votes	%	±%
Liberal	John Cannis	26,969	67.5	+10.1
Alliance	Bill Settatree	8,849	22.2	+3.7
New Democratic	Ali Mallah	3,171	7.9	-0.3
Marijuana	Paul Coulbeck	959	2.4	
Total valid votes		39,948	100.0	

Note: Canadian Alliance vote is compared to the Reform vote in 1997 election.

1997 Canadian federal election
Party	Candidate	Votes	%	±%
Liberal	John Cannis	25,185	57.4	+4.9
Reform	Bill Settatree	8,106	18.5	-2.2
Progressive Conservative	Brian Shedden	6,976	15.9	-4.6
New Democratic	Chris Stewart	3,619	8.2	+4.2
Total valid votes		43,886	100.0	

1993 Canadian federal election
Party	Candidate	Votes	%	±%
Liberal	John Cannis	21,097	52.5	+12.8
Reform	John Pope	8,323	20.7	
Progressive Conservative	Pauline Browes	8,257	20.5	-20.1
New Democratic	Guy Hunter	1,607	4.0	-14.9
National	Jean Schilling	321	0.8	
Natural Law	David Gordon	191	0.5	
Independent	Steven Lam	185	0.5	
Libertarian	George Dance	153	0.4	-0.4
Marxist–Leninist	France Tremblay	38	0.1	
Abolitionist	Denis A. Mazerolle	22	0.1	
Total valid votes		40,194	100.0	

1988 Canadian federal election
Party	Candidate	Votes	%	±%
Progressive Conservative	Pauline Browes	17,247	40.6	-6.0
Liberal	Odysseus Katsaitis	16,846	39.7	+6.4
New Democratic	Garth C. Dee	8,004	18.9	-0.4
Libertarian	Dusan Kubias	342	0.8	0.0
Total valid votes		42,439	100.0	

1984 Canadian federal election
Party	Candidate	Votes	%	±%
Progressive Conservative	Pauline Browes	19,968	46.7	+10.2
Liberal	Norm Kelly	14,229	33.3	-7.1
New Democratic	Michael Prue	8,240	19.3	-3.2
Libertarian	Mathias Blecker	345	0.8	+0.2
Total valid votes		42,782	100.0	

1980 Canadian federal election
Party	Candidate	Votes	%	±%
Liberal	Norm Kelly	16,595	40.3	+7.0
Progressive Conservative	Diane Stratas	14,995	36.4	-7.0
New Democratic	Michael Prue	9,237	22.4	+0.3
Libertarian	Mathias Blecker	238	0.6	+0.1
Marxist–Leninist	Judith Killoran	97	0.2	+0.1
Total valid votes		41,162	100.0	

1979 Canadian federal election
Party	Candidate	Votes	%
Progressive Conservative	Diane Stratas	18,688	43.4
Liberal	Bruce L. Cox	14,323	33.3
New Democratic	Tom Lyons	9,533	22.2
Libertarian	Don Otto	213	0.5
Independent	David Owen	203	0.5
Marxist–Leninist	Judith Killoran	70	0.2
Total valid votes		43,030	100.0

== See also ==
- List of Canadian electoral districts
- Historical federal electoral districts of Canada
