= Nathon Gunn =

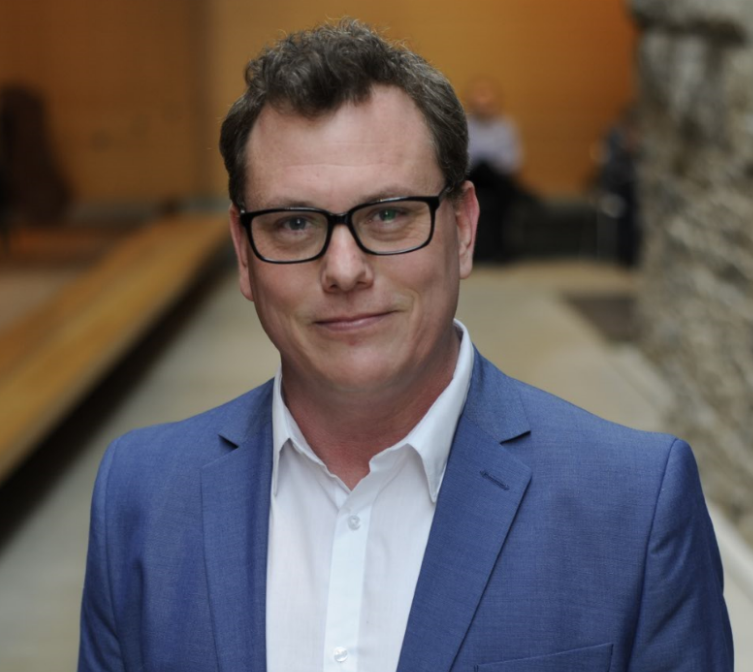
- Occupation: Entrepreneur
- Known for: Innovation, Politics, Technology, Games, Entrepreneurship

Nathon Gunn (born November 4, 1973) is a Toronto-based Canadian serial entrepreneur and co-founder of Bitcasters Inc., Social Game Universe, LightningPlatform and most recently x-Pollinate. His work includes helping founders with strategy and growth. He is a mentor, writer, speaker and advises in the support of start-ups, scale-ups, democratic development, civic engagement, democratization of technology and entrepreneurship at forums like the Government of Canada, C100 and conferences such as Personal Democracy Forum, and in books such as "Searching for the New Liberalism" His most recent contribution to the Canadian political landscape was in the form of senior innovation advisor to Minister of Innovation, Science and Economic Development Navdeep Bains where they developed Canada's Innovation Agenda, a primary focus of the 2017 Canadian federal budget. One of the major aspects was the Strategic Innovation Fund, a novel programme which was slated to run for five years and provide $1.26 billion over its life.

== Career ==
In 1996, Gunn founded Bitcasters with Duane Wall and Oli Goldsmith, an early multimedia production studio that had offices in Toronto and New York.

At Bitcasters, Gunn produced the music video for Our Lady Peace's "In Repair" (Spiritual Machines) which was nominated for 8 awards at the 2003 MuchMusic Video Awards.

Bitcasters created Bitcast.com one of the first tools for uploading and editing video to the web and was a pioneer in the User-generated content space.

From 2001 to 2004 Gunn also spearheaded the Internet and Digital campaign initiatives for Prime Minister Paul Martin's Liberal Party leadership bid and subsequently acted as head of digital during Martin's successful election as Prime Minister. This was followed by innovative technology work for the Office of the Prime Minister (Canada).

In 2009, his philanthropic game History Game Canada was introduced. It was inspired by and created in partnership with Tom Axworthy.

In 2009, Gunn founded Social Game Universe in Toronto, Ontario, Canada, with the stated goal of creating a network of interconnected small casual games such as Hollywood Tycoon that in aggregate would form a digital universe of players interacting while playing diverse games. The company created an ad banner system, IGAPI, that leverages social media and game mechanics for product discovery.

Gunn served as a Director of the Board of the Ontario Media Development Corporation (now Ontario Creates).

From 2014 to 2016 Gunn mentored and supported entrepreneurs through Singularity University

In 2016, Liberal cabinet Minister Navdeep Bains appointed Gunn as his top innovation advisor to help the minister's office create a broad strategy to help industries confront rapid technological change, which resulted in the National Innovation Agenda for Canada and lead to Canada's federal 2017 budget being called the Innovation Budget.
