= Patrick Johnston (Canadian politician) =

Patrick Johnston CM is a Canadian administrator, policy analyst and former politician. He was recruited by Liberal Party leader John Turner to contest the 1988 election for the party, but unexpectedly lost his nomination to a rival candidate supported by anti-abortion activists.

A teacher and social worker from Toronto, Johnston served for six years as leader of the National Anti-Poverty Organization. Originally a member of the New Democratic Party, he joined the Liberals in 1984 after charging the NDP with lacking a coherent economic policy. He served as senior advisor to Ontario Premier David Peterson's Social Assistance Review Committee.

Despite strong support from the party establishment, he lost the Liberal nomination in Scarborough West to a little-known Toronto lawyer named Tom Wappel, 523 votes to 372. Wappel, a staunch social conservative, was supported by members of the pro-life group Campaign Life. Johnston, who was thirty-nine years old in 1988, remained a senior policy advisor to John Turner after this defeat.

Johnston was hired as a senior policy advisor to Ontario Premier David Peterson in 1989, and held this position until Peterson's defeat in 1990. He later served as executive director of the Canadian Council on Social Development. In the latter capacity, he promoted economic intervention to address poverty issues and spoke out against workfare programs.

In 1994, Johnston chaired a task-force convened by cabinet minister Lloyd Axworthy on reforms to Canada's welfare state. He later served as president and CEO of the Canadian Centre for Philanthropy, an umbrella group covering a variety of charitable groups. During this period, he served as co-chair of the Joint Coordinating Committee of the Voluntary Sector Initiative, an attempt to strengthen the relationship between the federal government and Canada's voluntary, non-profit sector. He was also elected to chair the board of directors of the Johannesburg-based NGO, Civicus: World Alliance for Citizen Participation.

In October, 2002 he was appointed president and CEO of the Walter and Duncan Gordon Foundation a private charitable foundation established by former federal Liberal finance Minister, Walter Gordon. During this period, Johnston served on the board of directors of Philanthropic Foundations Canada and the Council on Foundations based in Washington. In 2010, he oversaw a foundation-led project to reimagine Canadian foreign aid that resulted in the publication of four papers. He was also a visiting Fellow at Mowat Centre for Policy Innovation at the University of Toronto's School of Public Policy and Governance.

In 2011, Johnston launched Borealis Advisors, a consultancy supporting leaders of charitable and philanthropic organizations. He serves as volunteer on a number of non-profit boards and advisory committees, including Canada Helps, the Ontario Nonprofit Network and the Canadian Centre for International Justice.
