= Liberals for Life =

Advocacy group in the Liberal Party of Canada

- Dissolved: 1993
- Type: Advocacy organization
- Purpose: Anti-abortion advocacy in the Liberal Party of Canada
- Region served: Canada
- National co-ordinator: Dan McCash

Liberals for Life was an anti-abortion advocacy group that worked within the Liberal Party of Canada during the 1980s and early 1990s. Some of its members were also affiliated with the Campaign Life Coalition; as such, the group was often accused of entryism.

According to its members, Liberals for Life was created after the national victory of Brian Mulroney's Progressive Conservative Party in the 1984 federal election. The organization attracted little attention until the early 1990s, when it endorsed Tom Wappel in his bid for the party leadership, and gained control of several riding associations. Wappel, the Member of Parliament for Scarborough West, had won his party's nomination in 1988 with the support of Liberals for Life and the Campaign Life Coalition, beating Patrick Johnson, a former advisor to Ontario Premier David Peterson and the co-chair of the party's platform committee who had the support of Leader John Turner. (Note: Lawrence Hanson found that nearly three-quarters of the delegates supporting Wappel at the 1990 leadership convention "received assistance in becoming a delegate from pro-life advocates.")

The Liberal Party's constitution was amended to allow the leader to appoint candidates in certain ridings in 1992. The party's leader Jean Chrétien defended the change as necessary to prevent "single-issue groups" from taking over the Liberal Party. It was generally understood that Liberals for Life was the primary target of this remark as candidates endorsed by Liberals for Life would ultimately seek nominations in approximately twenty per cent of ridings. Chrétien appointed future MPs Jean Augustine (Etobicoke—Lakeshore), Maria Minna (Beaches—Woodbine), and Georgette Sheridan (Saskatoon—Humboldt) as candidates to block the election of anti-abortion candidates in the 1993 federal election. R. Kenneth Carty, William Cross, and Lisa Young argue that Chrétien's actions "did not reflect a deep commitment to reproductive freedom on the part of the Liberal party; rather, it was motivated by the party's need to retain its ability not to take a stand on this potentially divisive issue." Despite Chrétien's actions, anti-abortion candidates Dan McTeague, Paul Szabo, and Paul Zed were successful in being elected under the Liberal Party banner in 1993.

Eddie Goldenberg, then Chrétien's chief policy adviser, argues that the measures Chrétien took ahead of the 1993 election ended Liberals for Life "pretty quickly". The movement effectively dissolved in 1993 after the Liberal Party formed government.

== See also ==
- Democrats for Life of America
- National Women's Liberal Commission
