= The Walter and Duncan Gordon Foundation =

Canadian charitable foundation

The Walter and Duncan Gordon Foundation is a private charitable foundation focused on the improvement of public policy in Canada. The foundation is based in Toronto, Ontario, and has two major areas of focus: the Arctic and Water Security.

== History ==
=== Early years ===
The Walter and Duncan Gordon Foundation was founded in 1965 by Walter L. Gordon, his wife, Elizabeth (née Counsell), and his brother, Duncan Gordon. Walter Gordon was a Canadian businessman and politician; he was the Minister of Finance from 1963 to 1965 and the president of the Privy Council from 1967 to 1968. Later on in his life he was the Chancellor of York University. Duncan Gordon was a chartered accountant at various Toronto firms.

Throughout the 1960s and 1970s, the Gordons made a number of contributions to healthcare, the arts and public policy, including donations to hospitals, hospices and art programs in and around the Toronto area. Various Canadian think tanks such as the Canadian Institute of International Affairs (now the Canadian International Council) were supported by the Foundation.

In the 1970s the foundation refocused its funding towards Canada's economic independence, and helped create the Committee for an Independent Canada.

During the 1970s and 1980s the Foundation also focused much of its attention on peacekeeping, peacemaking and nuclear disarmament. There were many recipients of grants from the Foundation, including Science for Peace, the Club of Rome, Amnesty International, Physicians for Social Responsibility, United Nations Association of Canada, and the Canadian Institute of Strategic Studies. The Foundation also helped to publicize the problem of acid rain in 1981; this contributed to amendments to the U.S. Clean Air Act of 1990.

After the death of Walter Gordon in 1987, Duncan Gordon asked Pierre Trudeau's former primary secretary and speechwriter Thomas Axworthy to help develop a focus for the foundation with regards to peace-building. After the death of Duncan Gordon later on that year, Walter's children took over the foundation and headed the board of directors. They also expanded the Foundation from a family to a private foundation model. The directors decided to refocus the Foundation's mandate to concentrate on four areas of interest: secondary education; peace, security and conflict management; the environment and the Arctic.

=== 1990s ===
The Foundation endowed the Walter Gordon Forum on Public Policy in 1990, which continues as an annual event at Massey College with the School of Public Policy and Global Governance at the University of Toronto.

After the amendments to the U.S. Clean Air Act, the Foundation started to focus on federal environmental policy. The Foundation narrowed its environmental to focus air quality and water issues. In the 1990s the Foundation also helped to create MiningWatch Canada, People for Education and the Manitoba School Improvement Program.

The foundation's efforts for peace, security and conflict management eventually combined with their concentration on the Arctic. The Walter and Duncan Gordon Foundation along, with Science for Peace and Finnish researchers, worked to promoted the creation of the Arctic Council. Arctic scholars, including Franklyn Griffiths, John Lamb and Bill Fox, as well as politician Tony Penikett, and indigenous advocates Rosemarie Kuptana Mary Simon and the Inuit Circumpolar Council, collaborated with the Canadian government to create the Arctic Council and the Canadian Ambassador for Circumpolar Affairs in 1994. The Foundation also supported Sheila Watt-Cloutier during her leadership as the Chair of the Inuit Circumpolar Conference.

=== 2000s ===
In 2009, Thomas Axworthy became CEO and President of the Walter and Duncan Gordon Foundation. Because of reduced funding, some of the programs were wound down, and the Foundation at that time focused its activities on policies about fresh water and the Arctic.

The Walter and Duncan Gordon Foundation funded a legal analysis which clarified the circumstances under which First Nations were eligible to receive grants from foundations, clarifying First Nations as legal donees under Canada Revenue Agency's Income Tax Act.

The Walter and Duncan Gordon Foundation helped create the IBA Community Toolkit, a resource to First Nation, Inuit and Métis communities to educate them about the benefit agreements in their areas. The toolkit is based around the mining sector, and is applicable within the natural resource industry.

The Union of BC Indian Chiefs, Ecotrust Canada and the Walter and Duncan Gordon Foundation came together to fund and publish Living Proof, a how-to manual written by Terry N. Tobias for designing and carrying out data-collection during indigenous use and occupancy map surveys. In the 1990s the Walter and Duncan Gordon Foundation collaborated with David Schindler a limnologist at the University of Alberta.

More recently, the Foundation along with Tides Canada, helped fund studies which, unlike a joint industry-government panel report, supported the view that pollutant levels in the north are due to human development rather than natural sources. in the Alberta Oilsands. The foundation has also collaborated with the Circle on Philanthropy and Aboriginal Peoples, a network which promotes social investing in Aboriginal communities in Canada.

== Programs ==
=== Global Citizenship ===
The Global Citizenship Program, set up to discuss Canada's role in the world, was headed from 2005-2010 by the former president and CEO of the Walter and Duncan Gordon Foundation Patrick Johnston. The program was suspended in 2010 after the Walter and Duncan Gordon Foundation's budget was restructured.

=== Arctic Program ===
Between 2010 and 2014 the Walter and Duncan Gordon Foundation supported the Arctic Security Program in conjunction with the Canada Centre for Global Security Studies at the Munk School of Global Affairs. In January 2011 the Walter and Duncan Gordon Foundation along with the Canada Centre for Global Security Studies at the Munk School of Global Affairs released a public opinion poll focused on the global perceptions of Arctic Security called "Rethinking the Top of the World". About 2,800 Canadians, including 744 residents of the territories, were surveyed along with residents of the seven other Arctic Council states (Russia, United States, Sweden, Norway, Finland, Iceland and Greenland/ Denmark) totaling 9,000 people. The survey findings garnered substantial media attention globally.

The Arctic Program focuses on Nunavut, Yukon and the Northwest Territories, as well as Northern Quebec (Nunavik) and Northern Labrador (Nunatsiavut). The program encourages leadership and government participation by young Northern Canadians, promotes equity in the distribution of benefits from exploiting natural resources, and supports issues in the Arctic related to food security, search and rescue, and human and capital infrastructure.

=== Fresh Water Program ===
The Walter and Duncan Gordon Foundation has supported legal, regulatory and citizen action activities to protect the quality and quantity of fresh water resources in Canada, and to ensure access to drinking water to all Canadians. Beginning in March 2011, the foundation has helped to organize Canadian Water Week. That year the foundation, along with the Inter-Action Council held an international conference discussing global water security and policy. The conference was chaired by Jean Chrétien the former prime minister of Canada, Olusegun Obasanjo the former president of Nigeria and former Cc"Chrétien's call to Canada: Don't be afraid of water-exporting debate". The Globe and Mail Accessed March 25, 2011</ref> In May 2011, the foundation's Tom Axworthy was appointed secretary general of the InterAction Council.

The Walter and Duncan Gordon Foundation funded the Forum for Leadership in Water (FLOW) and Tides Canada, both of which promote water security and education for Canadians. After 15 years, the foundation withdrew its funding from the Munk School's Program on Water Issues in 2016. Tom Axworthy, the Foundation president, also created the Mackenzie Data Stream, an online system that provides real time access to communities and decision makers on water quality indicators.

=== Jane Glassco Arctic Fellowship Program ===
With the passing of Jane Glassco, the daughter of Walter and Elizabeth Gordon in 2010, the foundation set up an Arctic Fellowship Program. The fellowships are presented to young Northerners, many of which are of Aboriginal descent between the ages of 25–35. The J.M. Kaplan Fund co-funds the Program.

=== Elizabeth L. Gordon Art Program ===
During her lifetime Elizabeth Gordon contributed to and supported the local arts, including funding to the Shaw Festival and the Art Gallery of Ontario. The Elizabeth L. Gordon Art Program helps Ontario galleries expand their collections. It was suspended after 2009.
