= Tom Axworthy =

Canadian civil servant

Thomas Sidney Axworthy, OC (born May 23, 1947) is a Canadian civil servant, political strategist, writer and professor. He is best known for having served as Principal Secretary and Chief Speechwriter to Canadian Prime Minister Pierre Trudeau. Axworthy is currently the Secretary General of the InterAction Council. Previously, he was president and CEO of the Walter and Duncan Gordan Foundation. He is a senior fellow at the Munk School of Global Affairs, Massey College, and the Bill Graham Centre of Contemporary International History, Trinity College, at the University of Toronto.

== Personal life and education ==
Axworthy was born in 1947 in Winnipeg, Manitoba, the second of four boys of Norman and Gwen Axworthy. He is the younger brother of Lloyd Axworthy, who has also had a distinguished career in Canadian politics. His parents were active in the United Church and community affairs. Through the United Church, he became a member of the Tuxis and Older Boys Association, eventually being elected as Premier. He entered United College, a United Church affiliated college in 1964, taking honours in history and politics. United College became the University of Winnipeg in 1968. At United College Axworthy was active in the debating club, student council, Uniter newspaper and model parliaments. Axworthy received a BA degree (Hons) from the University of Winnipeg and an MA degree from Queen's University (1972). From 1972 to 1973, he was a student at Nuffield College, University Of Oxford. He received a PhD degree (1979) from Queen's University. While at United College he met his future wife Roberta. They have two children and four grandchildren. In 2003, the University of Winnipeg gave Axworthy its Distinguished Alumni Award. Axworthy returned to live in his native Winnipeg, Manitoba in 2021.

== Early career ==
Tom Axworthy joined the Liberal Party in the early 1960s, becoming active in the Canadian University Liberal Federation. As well as his involvement in the Young Liberals, Axworthy was a Liberal volunteer in Winnipeg local ridings in the elections of 1958, 1962, 1963, 1965 and 1968. In 1967, he worked as a research assistant for the Task Force on the Structure of the Canadian Economy, led by Walter Gordon. This was Axworthy's first opportunity to work on Canada's economic, social and industrial policies in depth, and this influenced his future thinking about such issues. His close association with Walter Gordon introduced him to Keith Davey, Jim Coutts, Tom Kent and Pierre Trudeau, all of whom became important influences in his life. In his graduate studies at Queens, Axworthy's concentrations were in Canadian politics, international relations and urban affairs. His first publications were for The Institute of Urban Studies at the University of Winnipeg and while at Queen's University he became a research associate on the Metropolitan Winnipeg Study by University of Toronto professor Meyer Brownstone, the architect of the unicity amalgamation. L.J. Sharpe of Nuffield College subsequently invited Axworthy to study the politics of urban reform at Oxford. In 1974, at the invitation of Keith Davey, Axworthy returned to Ottawa to work on urban issues in that year's election campaign, where he drafted the Liberal Party's housing platform. Following the election, he joined the Office of the Minister of National Revenue as a special assistant on various policy issues. A year later, he was hired with the Prime Minister's Office (PMO) under Principal Secretary Jim Coutts as a political strategist and policy advisor to Prime Minister Pierre Trudeau. In 1976 he helped organize the United Nations Conference on Human Settlements, held in Vancouver, British Columbia which initiated his interest in water and sanitation issues, a priority in his later work with the Gordon Foundation. In 1979, with the defeat of the Liberals by Joe Clark, Axworthy worked in the Leader of the Opposition's Office as acting director and senior policy advisor.

With the defeat of Clark's minority government, Axworthy returned to the Prime Minister's Office as senior policy advisor, and was appointed Principal Secretary to Pierre Trudeau in 1981, a position which he held until 1984. During this time, he was a key strategist in the Repatriation of the Constitution and the Canadian Charter of Rights and Freedoms.

== 1984-2005 ==
In 1984, Axworthy was invited to be a Fellow at the Institute of Politics at the Kennedy School of Government, before being appointed as the visiting Mackenzie King Chair of Canadian Studies at Harvard University in 1985. He also became a fellow at the Centre for International Affairs working on the Canadian program. He was appointed as an adjunct lecturer at the Kennedy School in 1991, teaching comparative politics, and continued to teach at Harvard until returning to Canada in 2003 as an adjunct lecturer at the School of Policy Studies at Queen's University.

While at Harvard, Axworthy co-drafted the Universal Declaration of Human Responsibilities with world-renowned theologian Hans Küng, a major project of the InterAction Council of Former Heads of State and Government. At Harvard, Axworthy's interests became more international; he initiated a joint research program with the University of Havana and took his Harvard class often to Cuba. He helped found the North America Institute of Santa Fe under the direction of Professor John Wirth which examined Mexican, Canadian and American public policies. He travelled regularly to Hong Kong and China to teach in the executive program of the Kennedy School. Given his years of research on and teaching in Asia he was invited by the Government of Canada in 2001 to chair the board of the Asia Pacific Foundation of Canada. With his Kennedy School colleague Shirley Williams, a former British cabinet minister, he contributed to Project Liberty to assist the newly emerging democracies of central and eastern Europe, and he was recruited by the National Democratic Institute to assist their democratic promotion efforts in Ukraine.

During his time at Harvard, Axworthy also served as vice-president and then executive director for the Charles R. Bronfman Foundation (CRB). The CRB Foundation, during this time, created the well-known "Heritage Minute" series of commercials, which explored various aspects of Canadian History, and which were released on television and in movie theatres. The CRB Foundation also had important programs in Israel and the Middle East such as the Economics of Peace which attempted to foster cooperation between Israel and its neighbours. In 1999, Axworthy helped create and raise funds for the Historica Foundation, becoming its executive director. The Historica Foundation aimed to improve the teaching and learning of Canadian history, and was best known for its Heritage Fair program, which encouraged hundreds of thousands of students annually to create and exhibit their own heritage projects. Historica notably digitized the Canadian Encyclopedia, making it available to millions online for free. The Encyclopedia has since become a division of Historica Canada. Axworthy collaborated with Nathon Gunn to create History Game Canada, which won a MacArthur Foundation award for Innovation in Participatory Learning. In recognition of his outstanding achievement and service in the field of history and heritage, Axworthy was made an Officer of the Order of Canada in 2002. In 2005, Axworthy left the Historica Foundation to return to academe full-time at Queen's University.

== 2006-2008 ==
Until 2009, Axworthy was the chair and executive director of the Centre for the Study of Democracy (CSD) at Queen's University. Under his direction, the CSD released several studies on improving Canadian political institutions, such as parliament and the public service. The CSD also released a major study on how Canada could advance democracy abroad which led to him being asked to chair a task force to implement the Harper government's Speech on the Throne promise on democracy promotion.

In the wake of the defeat of Paul Martin's minority Liberal Government in January, 2006, Axworthy was appointed co-chair of the Liberal Party Renewal Commission, which was charged with re-thinking the Liberal Party's policies and structure. Axworthy had written his Queen's University masters thesis on Walter Gordon's role in reforming the Liberal Party, especially the Kingston Conference of 1960, and this early renewal effort influenced his views on party process. The commission created 32 task forces that were charged with examining each aspect of the party. The commission reported just prior to the Liberal Leadership Convention of December 2–3, 2006, urging the party to return to its liberal philosophical roots, to refocus on developing and electrifying its membership, and to rethink many of the fundamental policies that have informed Liberal policy. Specific recommendations that emerged from the Commission included a Thinker's Conference (to develop a new platform for the party), a Council of Riding Presidents (to represent the membership of the party in years between conventions), and a Day of Deliberation, in which Liberal Party Members across the country would be asked to debate and vote on policies in each of their ridings.

In 2009, Axworthy was asked to chair the Advisory Task Force on Democracy Promotion for the Minister of Democratic Reform, the Hon. Steven Fletcher. The unanimous report of the Task Force, however, was never implemented by the Harper government.

== Currently ==
In 2009 Dr. Axworthy became the president and CEO of the Walter and Duncan Gordon Foundation. Axworthy has had a long association with the foundation, advising Walter and Duncan Gordon in the mid-1980s on the foundation's evolution. As a volunteer, he chaired the foundation's Arctic Steering Committee, 1988–96, which co-ordinated the foundation's contributions to the creation of the Arctic Council, an international organization dedicated to Arctic cooperation. In his 2009-2015 tenure as president, the Gordon Foundation concentrated on Canada's North and the preservation of Canada's fresh water. While at the Gordon Foundation, Axworthy initiated the Jane Glassco Northern Fellowship, a policy and leadership development program for young Northern Canadians. The foundation also created the Mackenzie Data Stream, an online system that provides real time access to communities and decision makers on water quality indicators.

Axworthy has long been concerned with the environment, serving on the board of the Harmony Foundation, dedicated to environmental education, since 1989. Axworthy has been active in other education initiatives as well having served on the boards of Pearson College UWC and Canada World Youth.

Axworthy appears regularly on television and radio as a political analyst. He also frequently contributes to various academic journals, magazines and newspapers, especially the Toronto Star (as a former columnist), Policy Options, Policy Magazine and China Today. He has also edited a number of books, most notably Towards a Just Society: The Trudeau Years, which he co-edited with Pierre Trudeau in 1990.

In 2015, Axworthy was elected as a Member of the Pierre Elliot Trudeau Foundation and in the same year the Trudeau family asked him to become the literary executer of the Pierre Elliot Trudeau Estate.

In 2011, Axworthy was appointed and remains the Secretary General of the InterAction Council which he has been an associate member of since 2008, but has been closely involved with since 1995. InterAction Council is "an international organization whose objective is to address long-term, global issues facing humankind. The Council is currently co-Chaired by Bertie Ahern, the former Prime Minister of Ireland and the former President of Nigeria Olusegun Obasanjo (the Right Honourable Jean Chrétien (Prime Minister of Canada, is Honorary co-chair). The Council is composed of more than thirty former heads of state who jointly develop proposals for action and submit them directly to national and international decision-makers."

In 2012, Axworthy was awarded the Queen's Diamond Jubilee Medal for his contributions to Canadian public policy.

In 2016 Massey College, University of Toronto, asked him to become Public Policy Chair. In 2017 Axworthy also accepted the invitation of Zhejiang University, Hangzhou, China, to be a visiting professor where he lectures annually and contributes regularly to China Today magazine.
