= Reginald Stackhouse =

Canadian politician

Member of Parliament for Scarborough West
- In office 1984–1988
- Preceded by: David Weatherhead
- Succeeded by: Tom Wappel

Member of Parliament for Scarborough East
- In office 1972–1974
- Preceded by: Martin O'Connell
- Succeeded by: Martin O'Connell

Personal details
- Born: Reginald Francis Stackhouse; 30 April 1925 Toronto, Ontario, Canada
- Died: 14 December 2016 (aged 91) Toronto, Ontario, Canada
- Party: Progressive Conservative
- Profession: Professor

Reginald "Reg" Francis Stackhouse (30 April 1925 – 14 December 2016) was a Canadian educator and politician. He served in the House of Commons of Canada from 1972 to 1974 and from 1984 to 1988 as a member of the Progressive Conservative Party.

== Background ==
Stackhouse was born in Toronto, Ontario, and educated at the University of Toronto, Wycliffe College and Yale University. He held Ph.D. and Th.D. degrees, and practised as an Anglican priest. Stackhouse was a Trustee for the Scarborough Board of Education from 1965 to 1972, served on the Canadian Council of Regents from 1969 to 1972, and was a founding board member of Centennial College.

== Politics ==
Stackhouse campaigned for the Legislative Assembly of Ontario in the 1967 provincial election as a candidate of the Progressive Conservative Party of Ontario in Scarborough West, and finished second against future New Democratic Party leader Stephen Lewis.

He was elected to the House of Commons in the 1972 federal election, narrowly defeating Liberal incumbent Martin O'Connell in Scarborough East. The Liberal Party won a narrow minority government in this election, and Stackhouse served as an opposition Member of Parliament (MP) for the next two years. He was not a candidate in the 1974 campaign, and served as principal of Wycliffe College from 1975 to 1985.

Stackhouse was returned to the House of Commons in the 1984 election, defeating Liberal incumbent David Weatherhead by nearly 5,000 votes in Scarborough West. The Progressive Conservatives won a landslide majority government in this election under Brian Mulroney's leadership, and Stackhouse served as a government backbencher for the next four years. In 1988, he urged a strong Canadian protest against the threatened arrest of Anglican Bishop Desmond Tutu in South Africa.

He was narrowly defeated in the 1988 election, losing to Liberal challenger Tom Wappel by 440 votes. During this campaign, members of the group Campaign Life distributed leaflets attacking Stackhouse as a "babykiller" because he supported abortion in some circumstances. He described this attack as "disgusting and reproachful", adding "That kind of personal attack by design has no part in a democracy." The Campaign Life campaign had endorsed Wappel, who opposed abortion under all circumstances.

Stackhouse returned to teaching theology and philosophy after leaving parliament. He also served as president of the Canadian National Exhibition Association after leaving parliament, and was appointed to a term on the Canadian Human Rights Commission in 1990.

He attempted a returned to parliament in the 1993 election, but finished third against Wappel with 5,664 votes (14.45%) amid a general decline in support for his party. In the buildup to the 1993 campaign, he called for the abolition of the Senate of Canada.

== Later life ==
Stackhouse continued teaching at the University of Toronto. In 2005, he published a work entitled The Coming Age Revolution, challenging traditional notions of retirement.

In 2011, he was made a Member of the Order of Ontario. Stackhouse died in Toronto on 14 December 2016.
