= New Reform Party of Ontario =

New Reform Party of Ontario Nouveau Parti réformiste de l’Ontario
- Former provincial party
- Founded: 1987
- Dissolved: 2016
- Headquarters: Hamilton, Ontario
- Ideology: Right-wing populism Fiscal conservatism Social conservatism Grassroots democracy Economic libertarianism Localism; Familialism
- Political position: Right-wing
- Colours: Blue, Green

Website
- newreform.ca

The New Reform Party of Ontario (NRP; French: Nouveau Parti réformiste de l'Ontario) was a minor provincial political party in Ontario, Canada, that promoted a populist, fiscally conservative, socially conservative, libertarian, and localist ideology.

It was formed in Hamilton in 1987 as the Family Coalition Party of Ontario (FCP) through 11,000 signatures fulfilling the Elections Ontario requirements by members from the Liberals for Life (a splinter group of the Liberal Party of Canada) and members of the anti-abortion organization Campaign Life Coalition. It fielded candidates in every provincial election until deregistration in 2016. None of its candidates were ever elected to the Legislative Assembly of Ontario.

In late 2015, the FCP renamed itself the "New Reform Party of Ontario", which maintained the party's conservative social values, while also promoting conservative fiscal values. It began to overhaul its principles, policies, and platform, reorganizing the central office, and aiming to reestablish is provincial executive council regionally in time for the next provincial election in Fall 2018.

The last leader of the NRP was James Gault and provincial party president was Lynne Scime.

The party was deregistered by Elections Ontario in January 2016.

== History ==
Logo of the Family Coalition Party of Ontario prior to 2015

The FCP was founded in 1987, as a political extension of the anti-abortion organization Campaign Life Coalition with anti-abortion Liberal members from the splinter group Liberals for Life. Donald Pennell, who had previously been a candidate for the Ontario Liberal Party in the Burlington South riding during the 1975 provincial election, was chosen as the FCP's first leader. In addition to promoting an anti-abortion position, the party developed a platform opposed to divorce, euthanasia, same-sex marriage and adoption of children by same-sex couples, embryonic stem cell research, in vitro fertilization, pornography, and contraception.

The party's first election was the 1987 provincial election, where the party ran 36 candidates for 48,110 votes overall and 1.3% of the vote in only four weeks of existence to organize for a fourth place showing ahead of the Libertarians. This solid performance from the upstart party led to expansion into new ridings with bigger membership base. The party's strongest showing was in the 1990 provincial election, when it received over 100,000 votes, once again good enough for a fourth place showing ahead of the Confederation of Regions Party. In 1990, several candidates received over 10% of the popular vote (the best was 13%). The party ran 76 candidates.

Its strong support declined dramatically in the 1995 and 1999 elections with fourth placings ahead of Natural Law, followed by a modest recovery in 2003 when the FCP ran in 51 of 103 ridings, but dropped from fourth to fifth place just below the Greens. The minor breakthrough was made, according to FCP leader Giuseppe Gori, through the democratization of the internet beyond the mainstream media and hope for a form of proportional representation ballot electoral reform. The party nominated 83 candidates in the 107 ridings for the 2007 provincial election; in those 83 ridings, it obtained 1.045% of the votes, or 0.82% province-wide. The FCP stayed in fifth place, under the Greens, but above the other minor parties.

The loss of traction in 1995 was blamed on the true blue wave of the Common Sense Revolution by the Mike Harris led Ontario PCs, taking with it a large swatch of anti-abortion socially conservative constituency from the traditional FCP base of support via the "Mulroney Effect" as was coined by the Campaign Life Coalition.

Pennell was succeeded by Giuseppe Gori in 1997, who lead the party into the 1999 election. The party achieved limited media attention by conducting a demonstration at Queen's Park featuring three "cloned sheep" to represent Progressive Conservative leader Mike Harris, Liberal leader Dalton McGuinty and New Democratic Party leader Howard Hampton. The FCP's intent was both to indicate their opposition to cloning technology, and to suggest that the major parties were identical in ignoring family issues, using the slogan "Liberal, Tory, NDP same old status quo story".

The FCP supported the 2007 electoral reform referendum for a mixed-member proportional representation (MMP) hybrid voting system.

The FCP set, according to the Toronto Star, a record for the number of family members running as candidates in a single election in 2007. Eight members of the Kidd family and six members of the Carvalho family are running as candidates in the Greater Toronto Area. The newspaper could not find a Guinness Book record for such a feat.

The party nominated 31 candidates in the 107 ridings for the 2007 provincial election; in those 31 ridings, it obtained 0.23% of the votes province-wide. The FCP dropped to sixth place as the Greens and Libertarians surpassed. Gori stepped down in 2009, and Phil Lees was acclaimed leader.

After the 2011 provincial election, the FCP worked on local advocacy campaigns within various communities around the province, most notably involving the challenge of Bill 13, the anti-bullying legislation introduced by the Ontario Liberal government. Lees was a speaker at two Queen's Park Bill 13 protest rallies in early 2012. Education soon became the prime issue for the FCP. The FCP stated in early 2014 that it intends to become more active and visible between elections, to better represent what it calls the "traditional-principled" electorate in Ontario, which led it to move closer towards a grassroots participatory democratic political ideology.

After the 2014 election, the Reform Party of Ontario had been deregistered by Elections Ontario for failing to run candidates, and the FCP had finished poorly with its worst showing in a distant seventh place, running only six candidates in 2014 for 0.09% of the votes province-wide for the former fourth party just more than a quarter century previous. The party voted to change its name to the New Reform Party of Ontario (NRP) in a December 2014 membership vote and began the process to overhaul its principles, policies, and platform, reorganizing the central office, and reestablishing provincial executive council regionally in time for the next provincial election. In 2015, Gault stood in the Simcoe North byelection against newly chosen Progressive Conservative leader Patrick Brown; Gault placed fifth out of eight candidates, with 197 votes and 0.50%. The party was deregistered in 2016, shortly after Gault filed to run in the Whitby—Oshawa by-election; Gault was formally included as an independent, though he continued to promote the party. He later withdrew from the race and endorsed Greg Vezina of the None of the Above Party of Ontario, which he stated shared the NRP's "3Rs of Democracy" idea of responsible government, referendum, and recall.

=== Relationship with the Christian Heritage Party ===
The NRP's membership overlapped significantly with that of the federal Christian Heritage Party of Canada. The parties shared many socially conservative policies, but had no organizational connection.

== Ideology ==
New Reform Ontario's principles remained the same as they were with the FCP, which include respect for life, freedom, and ownership of property. The NRP "adheres to principles expressed in the Canadian Constitution that recognize the supremacy of God and the rule of law, natural law and just human law. The New Reform Party believes in the democratic principle of subsidiarity: Government is an institution created by people, while people’s fundamental rights are inherent in every human being as each one is created by the Creator God. The role of government is restricted to what individuals and private organizations cannot do by themselves. The New Reform Party is committed to restricting its own policies and rule accordingly, were it elected to govern." The NRP believed all people are equal and should be treated as such under the law.

On familial issues, they emphasized "the family, rather than the individual" as the "basic building block of our society", and asserted that the promotion of stronger family units will result in reduced social problems and a more robust workforce. On marriage issues, the party emphasised the family unit, favouring heterosexual married couples, as it opposed spousal benefits for same-sex couples and common-law heterosexual couples. The NRP supported increasing personal and spousal tax exemption, and providing assistance to single mothers who choose to carry a pregnancy to term. It also recognized "the work of mothers in the nurturing of children", and supported increased tax benefits for stay-at-home parents. The party opposed Sunday shopping and supported a housing and taxation policy beneficial to family. On human life issues, the party supported an end to the taxpayer funding and support of abortion by the government, and the "harvesting" and production of "spare parts" by keeping anencephalic babies alive. On education issues, they supported funding of all schools, not just the public and Catholic systems favouring options for families to choose the form of education that best suits their values and needs, and the protection of parental values in the school setting.

The party's "Contract with Ontario", after the 2007 election, incorporated 12 points: "We will not breach your trust and we will uphold the truth; we will govern according to moral principles, defending life, freedom and property; we believe in the value and dignity of the human person over and above material goods, ideologies and corporate entities; we will defend the traditional family as the first government where children are educated in knowledge, wisdom and responsibility; we believe any government above the family is delegated and must be chosen through fair and democratic elections; we will maintain an optimum amount of government and avoid government duplication of what individuals, families, associations, groups and businesses can do; we believe an optimum amount of government can greatly improve the economic environment and thus, the standard of living, employment levels, and wealth creation; we believe people have free will and are called to exercise it; we believe people are dignified by employment; we believe people fully develop their potential by self-employment; we believe competition and high standards drive excellence; we do not believe in government or corporate monopolies."

The New Reform Ontario's ideals on various matters were generally traditional, being fiscal, economic, social, libertarian reformed conservative in tone, although not universally so. For one example, the NRP opposed the privatization and firesale of Hydro One by the Wynne Ontario Liberal government to pay down the debt and balance the budget, as it had no mandate from its recent majority election having not run on the idea and is just a "quick cash grab to pay short term projects and past financial mistakes" which run counter to free market economics. New Reform Ontario supported a reduction in the size of government, and "the long-term removal of all measures that insulate industries, businesses, financial institutions, professions and trade unions from domestic and foreign competition". The NRP believed that the limited government has a reduced role to play in issues relating to environmental, educational, and health care management, and ensuring access to health services regardless of ability to pay.

== Party leaders ==
- Donald Pennell (1987–1997)
- Giuseppe Gori (1997–2009)
- Phil Lees (2009–2014)
- Eric Ames (2014) (interim)
- James Gault (2014–2016)

== Election results ==
Year of election	No. of candidates	No. of seats won	No. of votes	% of popular vote
1987	36	0	48,110	1.3%
1990	68	0	110,831	2.7%
1995	55	0	61,657	1.5%
1999	37	0	24,216	0.6%
2003	51	0	34,623	0.8%
2007	83	0	35,763	0.8%
2011	31	0	9,861	0.23%
2014	6	0	4,288	0.09%

== See also ==
- List of Ontario general elections
- List of Ontario political parties
