= Tom Wappel =

Canadian politician (born 1950)

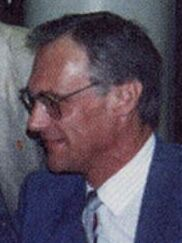

Member of Parliament for Scarborough Southwest (Scarborough West; 1988–1997)
- In office November 21, 1988 – October 13, 2008
- Preceded by: Reginald Stackhouse
- Succeeded by: Michelle Simson

Personal details
- Born: Thomas William Wappel; February 9, 1950 (age 76) Toronto, Ontario
- Profession: Lawyer

Thomas William Wappel (born February 9, 1950) is a Canadian retired politician. He was a Liberal member of the House of Commons from 1988 to 2008, representing the Toronto riding of Scarborough West and its successor riding of Scarborough Southwest. He did not seek re-election in the 2008 general election.

Wappel is a staunch social conservative. He is a prominent opponent of abortion and gay rights, and has made controversial comments on immigration and the role of religion in government. He opposes the death penalty and describes himself as holding liberal views on economic issues. In 1998, he was awarded the Joseph P. Borowski Award, presented to a pro-life Canadian politician. He is separated, with five children.

== Early life and career ==
Wappel was born in Toronto, to Hungarian parents. He holds a Bachelor of Arts degree from the University of Toronto (1971), and a Bachelor of Laws from Queen's University (1974). He was called to the Bar of Ontario in 1976 and worked in civil litigation and corporate law. Wappel has been a member of the Knights of Columbus.

== 1988 election ==
Wappel won the Scarborough West Liberal nomination in 1988 in a surprising upset over Patrick Johnston, a star candidate who had been personally recruited by party leader John Turner. His campaign was supported by members of the anti-abortion group Campaign Life, and his election platform included a pledge of "respect for human life, from conception to the natural end of life". He also opposed the Canada-United States free trade agreement, and criticized the media for portraying him as a single-issue candidate. He won a narrow victory in the general election, defeating Progressive Conservative incumbent Reginald Stackhouse by 440 votes.

During the election, Campaign Life activists circulated a pamphlet that accused Stackhouse of supporting "baby-killing" in some circumstances.

The Progressive Conservatives won a majority government in 1988, and Wappel entered Parliament as a member of the opposition. John Turner resigned as party leader in 1989, and a new leadership contest was called to select his replacement.

== Leadership candidate ==
Wappel was the first declared candidate in the Liberal Party's 1990 leadership convention, announcing his candidacy on June 29, 1989. He described himself as the only candidate willing to make abortion a leadership issue. Wappel spoke against abortion in all circumstances, saying that while rape and incest are terrible tragedies, "they cannot possibly be compounded by the further tragedy of destroying human life." He also called for increased immigration to Canada and harsher penalties against drug traffickers, while opposing the Meech Lake Accord and "distinct society" status for Quebec.

Wappel spoke against federal daycare programs during one all-candidates meeting, arguing that the Canadian government should promote stay-at-home parenting instead. Late in the campaign, he said that he did not consider single-parent households or same-sex couples to be families.

His candidacy was not supported by any other MPs although he won the endorsement of Liberals for Life, an anti-abortion pressure group working inside the Liberal Party, in March 1990. During his nomination speech at the convention, Wappel called for abortion to be made a criminal offence with a maximum penalty of life imprisonment. He finished in fourth place, as Jean Chrétien won the leadership on the first ballot.

== Opposition Critic ==
Wappel was appointed as the Liberal Party's immigration critic in January 1991. Late in the year, he prepared an internal party document calling for the creation of detainment camps (to be called Welcome Centres) for refugees arriving in Canada. Claimants would be provided with food, lodging and clothing, but would not be permitted to work outside the centre while their cases were under review. The proposal also called for any claimant with HIV to be automatically denied status. His suggestions were leaked to the media and were immediately rejected by the Liberal Party leadership. He was removed as the Liberal Party's immigration Critic in January 1992 and reassigned as critic for the Solicitor-General. In his new position, he called for increased safeguards in Canada's parole system.

Wappel was endorsed by the Canadian Police Association in the 1993 federal election, and focused his campaign on "law and order" issues. He was easily re-elected as the Liberals won a majority government nationally.

== Government backbencher ==
Chrétien government

Wappel was not appointed to Jean Chrétien's cabinet and was a frequent critic of his own party's social legislation. He opposed the Chrétien government's decision to extend anti-discrimination protection to homosexuals in 1994, describing homosexuality as "statistically abnormal, [...] physically abnormal and [...] morally immoral". Some politicians and journalists called for Chrétien to expel Wappel from caucus after this remark, but no disciplinary action was taken. Later in the year, Wappel described homosexuality as "not genetic, but a choice", while arguing that religion is "virtually genetic, since it is passed from generation to generation". He remained active on law enforcement issues, introducing a private member's bill to create a national witness protection program and calling for tougher provisions under Canada's Young Offenders Act.

He was re-elected to a third term in the 1997 election, again running on a "law and order" platform. When parliament resumed, he introduced a private member's bill designed to prevent persons convicted of serious crimes (and their relatives and collaborators) from receiving any financial benefit resulting from artistic depictions of their acts. The bill was supported by some members of the law enforcement community, but was criticized by artists and was often described as poorly drafted. Toronto journalist Michael Valpy dismissed it as "legal gibberish" and "a piece of junk". The bill passed the House of Commons but was rejected by the Senate of Canada in 1998, despite last-minute adjustments.

Wappel ran for Speaker of the House of Commons of Canada in 2001, seeking support from backbench Liberals and opposition members. He was eliminated after the first ballot of a secret vote by all members of Parliament (MPs).

He faced media scrutiny in May 2001, when he refused to help a blind, elderly veteran in his riding whom he suspected of having voted for a rival candidate in the previous election. Wappel wrote a letter to the constituent, asking "How is it that you are writing me for my help if you did not think enough of my abilities to justify voting for me?" The letter was released to the media, and Wappel's remarks were widely condemned by journalists and MPs from all parties. Chrétien reprimanded Wappel and required him to issue an apology. Wappel later described the letter as a "stupid mistake", and called for voters to forgive him.

In July 2002, Wappel joined with fifteen other Liberal MPs in calling for Paul Martin to succeed Jean Chrétien as Liberal leader. Later in the year, he was unexpectedly elected chair of the Standing Committee on Fisheries and Oceans in a free vote of other committee members. He issued a report in June 2003 arguing that federal bureaucrats had "badly managed" the sockeye salmon fishery in British Columbia's Fraser River two years earlier.

Martin government

Paul Martin succeeded Chrétien as party leader and prime minister in December 2003. Wappel remained a government backbencher, and was returned to a fifth parliamentary term in the 2004 election as the Liberals were reduced to a minority government.

Wappel remained one of the most vocal social conservatives in the Liberal caucus and was a prominent opponent of the Martin government's 2005 same-sex marriage legislation, which he described as "discriminatory, a sham, and a hoax". According to one report, Wappel told Martin that he was "profoundly disappointed" with his handling of the issue during a private caucus meeting. There was some speculation that Wappel would join fellow MP Pat O'Brien in leaving the Liberal caucus over the marriage bill, but he decided to remain in the party.

== Opposition MP ==
Wappel was re-elected to the House of Commons in the 2006 federal election, as the Conservative Party won a national minority government. Wappel was one of twenty-four Liberal MPs to vote for an extension of Canada's military mission in Afghanistan in May 2006. He also renewed his call for abortion legislation, describing Canada as "the only western democracy that has absolutely no law whatsoever when it comes to protecting the unborn child". In February 2007, he was the only Liberal MP to vote for the extension of two controversial anti-terrorism measures that had first been passed by the Chrétien government in the aftermath of the September 11, 2001 attacks. The measures, which critics described as a threat to civil liberties, were defeated when the Bloc Québécois, New Democratic Party and most Liberals voted not to support their extension. Wappel expressed surprise that more Liberal MPs did not support the extension.

Wappel did not endorse any candidate in the 2006 Liberal leadership election, as none of the candidates were declared social conservatives. He indicated that he would personally vote for Joe Volpe at the convention.

== Food labels ==
Wappel promoted several private member's bills calling for better nutritional labels on food products. In 1998, he introduced a bill that would have required nutritional labels on all foods sold in grocery stores. It was supported by the Alliance for Food Label Reform, and Wappel argued that it would help reduce the risk of heart disease and cancer among consumers. The bill was not passed.

In 2004, he introduced a separate bill requiring fast food restaurants to list salt and fat content on their menus. It was defeated by a vote of 198 to 64 in November 2006.

== Retirement ==
On March 23, 2007, Wappel announced that he would not stand in the next federal election. His tenure as a member of Parliament ended with the 2008 federal election.

Wappel joined the Campaign Life Coalition as its legal counsel on January 1, 2009.

== Electoral record ==
2006 Canadian federal election: Scarborough Southwest
Party	Candidate	Votes	%	±%	Expenditures
Liberal	Tom Wappel	19,930	47.83	−1.63	$31,803
Conservative	Vincent Veerasuntharam	10,017	24.04	+0.26	$68,687
New Democratic	Dan Harris	9,626	23.10	+0.79	$18,101
Green	Valerie Philip	1,827	4.38	+0.38	
Independent	Trevor Sutton	147	0.35		
Communist	Elizabeth Rowley	120	0.29	−0.15	$280
Total valid votes		41,667	99.55		
Total rejected ballots		189	0.45	−0.11	
Turnout		41,856	62.37	+5.21	
Electors on the lists		67,109			
Liberal hold		Swing		-0.94	
Sources: Official Results, Elections Canada and Financial Returns, Elections Canada.

2004 Canadian federal election: Scarborough Southwest
Party	Candidate	Votes	%	±%	Expenditures
Liberal	Tom Wappel	18,776	49.46	−10.36	$47,511
Conservative	Heather Jewell	9,028	23.78	−4.59	$63,040
New Democratic	Dan Harris	8,471	22.31	+12.05	$21,397
Green	Peter Van Dalen	1,520	4.00		not listed
Communist	Elizabeth Rowley	168	0.44		$300
Total valid votes		37,963	99.44		
Total rejected ballots		215	0.56		
Turnout		38,178	57.16		
Electors on the lists		66,797			
Liberal hold		Swing		-2.88	
Percentage change figures are factored for redistribution. Conservative Party percentages are contrasted with the combined Canadian Alliance and Progressive Conservative percentages from 2000.
Sources: Official Results, Elections Canada and Financial Returns, Elections Canada.

2000 Canadian federal election: Scarborough Southwest
Party	Candidate	Votes	%	±%	Expenditures
Liberal	Tom Wappel	21,466	60.01	+6.61	$47,146
Progressive Conservative	Ellery Hollingsworth	5,251	14.68	+1.01	$14,019
Alliance	Nabil El-Khazen	4,912	13.73	−6.72	$30,429
New Democratic	Dan Harris	3,638	10.17	−1.05	$10,666
Canadian Action	Walter Aolari	336	0.94		$4,886
Communist	Dora Stewart	165	0.46		$202
Total valid votes		35,768	99.34		
Total rejected ballots		237	0.66	−0.04	
Turnout		36,005	53.43	−9.52	
Electors on the lists		67,382			
Sources: Official Results, Elections Canada and Financial Returns, Elections Canada.
Liberal hold		Swing		+2.80	

1997 Canadian federal election: Scarborough Southwest
Party	Candidate	Votes	%	±%	Expenditures
Liberal	Tom Wappel	20,675	53.40	−1.34	$35,520
Reform	Tom Ambas	7,918	20.45	−0.69	$41,884
Progressive Conservative	Brian McCutcheon	5,294	13.67	−0.59	$16,872
New Democratic	Dave Gracey	4,345	11.22	+4.26	$7,984
Green	David James Cooper	482	1.25		$0.00
Total valid votes		38,714	99.30		
Total rejected ballots		273	0.70		
Turnout		38,987	62.95		
Electors on the lists		61,932			
Liberal hold		Swing		–0.33	
Percentage change figures are factored for redistribution.
Sources: Official Results, Elections Canada and Financial Returns, Elections Canada.

1993 Canadian federal election: Scarborough West
Party	Candidate	Votes	%	±%	Expenditures
Liberal	Tom Wappel	21,335	54.44	+17.64	$36,378
Reform	Aubrey Millard	8,314	21.21		$17,967
Progressive Conservative	Reg Stackhouse	5,664	14.45	−21.30	$43,710
New Democratic Party	Steve Thomas	2,771	7.07	−19.28	$39,447
National	Greg Gogan	578	1.47		$3,145
Green	Jim MacLeod	276	0.70		$140
Natural Law	Ron Robins	212	0.54		$0
Abolitionist	Alfred Morton	40	0.10		$94
Total valid votes		39,190	100.00		
Rejected, unmarked and declined ballots		346			
Turnout		39,536	64.21	−8.94	
Electors on the lists		61,574			
Source: Thirty-fifth General Election, 1993: Official Voting Results, Published by the Chief Electoral Officer of Canada. Financial figures taken from official contributions and expenses provided by Elections Canada.

1988 Canadian federal election: Scarborough West
Party	Candidate	Votes	%	±%	Expenditures
Liberal	Tom Wappel	15,363	36.80	−5.3	$42,085
Progressive Conservative	Reg Stackhouse	14,923	35.75	+7.2	$39,606
New Democratic	Dave Gracey	11,000	26.35	−0.6	$43,075
Libertarian	Anna Young	459	1.10		$1,558
Total valid votes		41,745	100.00		
Rejected, unmarked and declined ballots		226			
Turnout		41,971	73.15		
Electors on the lists		57,376			

All electoral information is taken from Elections Canada. Italicized expenditures from elections after 1997 refer to submitted totals, and are presented when the final reviewed totals are not available. Expenditures from 1997 refer to submitted totals. The +/- figures from 1997 and 2004 are adjusted for redistribution.
