= Douglas Peters =

Canadian banker, economist, and politician

The Honourable Douglas Peters PC

Member of Parliament for Scarborough East
- In office October 25, 1993 – June 2, 1997
- Preceded by: Bob Hicks
- Succeeded by: John McKay

Personal details
- Born: Douglas Dennison Peters; March 3, 1930 Brandon, Manitoba, Canada
- Died: October 7, 2016 (aged 86) Amsterdam, Netherlands
- Party: Liberal
- Spouse: Audrey Catherine Clark
- Relatives: Keir Gilchrist (grandson)
- Profession: Banker

Douglas Dennison Peters, PC (March 3, 1930 – October 7, 2016) was a Canadian banker, economist, and politician.

== Life and career ==
Peters was born in Brandon, Manitoba, the son of Mary Gladys (née Dennison) and Dr. Wilfrid Seymour Peters. In 1954, he married Audrey Catherine Clark (December 2, 1928 – August 2, 2007). He had two children, including professor David Wilfrid Peters, and two grandchildren, including actor Keir Gilchrist.

He received a Bachelor of Commerce degree from Queen's University in 1963 and a PhD from the Wharton School at University of Pennsylvania in 1969 where he was classmates with two other well-known Canadian economists, Arthur Donner and Robert Rabinovitch.

After serving as chief economist and senior vice-president of the Toronto-Dominion Bank, Peters entered politics in the 1993 election. He was elected as the Liberal Member of Parliament for Scarborough East. Prime Minister Jean Chrétien appointed Peters to the position of Secretary of State for International Financial Institutions. Peters retired from politics at the 1997 election.

In 1979, Peters and Arthur Donner wrote a book titled The Monetarist Counter-revolution: A Critique of Canadian Monetary Policy, 1975-1979. Douglas Peters and David Wilfrid Peters authored an article titled "Reforming Canada's Financial Services Sector: What Needs to Follow from Bill C8", that appeared in the December 2001 issue of the Canadian Public Policy journal.

According to author Linda McQuaig, Peters took a Keynesian economic prescription to government, and decided to leave politics when he found that his views were largely ignored.

26th Canadian Ministry (1993–2003) – Cabinet of Jean Chrétien
Sub-Cabinet Post
Predecessor	Title	Successor
	Secretary of State (International Financial Institutions) (1993–1997)	Jim Peterson
