= Martin O'Connell (politician) =

Canadian politician

The Honourable Martin O'Connell PC

Minister of Labour
- In office 24 November 1978 – 3 June 1979
- Prime Minister: Pierre Trudeau
- Preceded by: André Ouellet (acting)
- Succeeded by: Lincoln Alexander
- In office 28 January 1972 – 26 November 1972
- Prime Minister: Pierre Trudeau
- Preceded by: Bryce Mackasey
- Succeeded by: John Munro

Principal Secretary to the Prime Minister
- In office 1 December 1972 – 1974
- Prime Minister: Pierre Trudeau
- Preceded by: Marc Lalonde
- Succeeded by: James A. Coutts

Member of Parliament for Scarborough East
- In office 8 July 1974 – 21 May 1979
- Preceded by: Reginald Stackhouse
- Succeeded by: Gordon Gilchrist
- In office 25 June 1968 – 29 October 1972
- Preceded by: Riding created
- Succeeded by: Reginald Stackhouse

Personal details
- Born: Martin Patrick O'Connell; 1 August 1916 Victoria, British Columbia, Canada
- Died: 11 August 2003 (aged 87) Toronto, Ontario, Canada
- Party: Liberal
- Spouse: Helen Alice Dionne (m. 1945)
- Children: 2
- Education: Queen's University; University of Toronto
- Profession: Professor; Economist; Investment Dealer; Teacher
- Portfolio: Parliamentary Secretary to the Minister of Regional Economic Expansion (1969–71)

Martin Patrick O'Connell PC (1 August 1916 – 11 August 2003) was a Canadian politician.

Born in Victoria, British Columbia, he received a Bachelor of Arts from Queen's University. During World War II, he was a captain in the Royal Canadian Army Service Corps. After the war, he received an MA and a Ph.D from the University of Toronto.

In 1965, he ran for the House of Commons of Canada for the riding of Greenwood. He was defeated but was elected in 1968 in the riding of Scarborough East. A Liberal, he was defeated in the 1972 elections but was re-elected again in 1974. He ran twice more unsuccessfully in 1979 and 1980. From 1969 to 1971, he was the Parliamentary Secretary to the Minister of Regional Economic Expansion. From 1971 to 1972, he was the Minister of State and in 1972 he was the Minister of Labour.

After his defeat in the 1972 General Election, O'Connell served as Principal Secretary to Prime Minister Trudeau from 1973 until he was once again elected to the House of Commons in the 1974 General Election.

From 1978 to 1979, he again was the Minister of Labour.

From 1984 to 1989, he was the Chairman of the Council of Governors of the Canadian Centre for Occupational Health and Safety. In 1993 he was the co-founder and first co-chairman of The Canadian Foundation for the Preservation of Chinese Cultural and Historical Treasures.
