= Alan Gray Martin =

Canadian politician (1930–2022)

Member of Parliament for Scarborough West
- In office 1974–1979
- Preceded by: John Paul Harney
- Succeeded by: William Wightman

Personal details
- Born: 12 December 1930 Quebec City, Quebec, Canada
- Died: 20 January 2022 (aged 91) Midland, Ontario, Canada
- Party: Liberal
- Spouse: Barbara Louise Learmonth (m. 1954)
- Profession: chartered accountant

Alan Gray Martin (12 December 1930 – 20 January 2022) was a Canadian soldier, accountant and politician. Martin was a Liberal party member of the House of Commons of Canada. He was a major in the Royal Canadian Artillery (Militia) from 1947 to 1965 and was later a chartered accountant by career.

== Life and career ==
Alan Gray Martin was born in Quebec City and attended secondary school there. He then studied at the University of Toronto and Carleton University. He served with the Royal Canadian Artillery Militia from 1947 to 1965, reaching the rank of Major.

Martin was elected at the Scarborough West riding in the 1974 general election and served one term, the 30th Parliament. Martin was narrowly defeated at Scarborough West by William Wightman of the Progressive Conservative party in the 1979 federal election. He made further close, but unsuccessful attempts to win the Simcoe North riding (a primarily conservative riding) in the 1980, 1984, and 1988 elections. Alan served as Parliamentary Secretary to the Minister of Finance (October 1978 to March 1979) as well as Parliamentary Secretary to the Minister of Consumer and Corporate Affairs (October 1977 to September 1978).

Martin died in Midland, Ontario on 20 January 2022, at the age of 91.
