= Gordon Gilchrist =

Canadian politician (born 1928)

Member of Parliament for Scarborough East
- In office 1979–1984
- Preceded by: Martin O'Connell
- Succeeded by: Robert Hicks

Personal details
- Born: James Gordon Gilchrist; 11 August 1928 (age 97) Toronto, Ontario, Canada
- Party: Progressive Conservative
- Profession: Businessman

James Gordon Gilchrist (born 11 August 1928) is a retired Canadian politician who was a Progressive Conservative party member of the House of Commons of Canada. In the private sector, Gilchrist had held senior positions at Domtar Ltd. including General Manager for Alberta & BC and then, for 25 years, operated a series of Canadian Tire stores, winning the Pacesetter Award, in 1981, for combining above-average sales with exceptional community involvement.

Gilchrist was a Progressive Conservative Member of Parliament for Ontario's Scarborough East electoral district which he won in the 1979 federal election and again in 1980. He served on the Defence Committee and as the Critic for Science and Technology for the Progressive Conservatives. Gilchrist left national politics in 1984 and did not campaign in that year's federal election after being convicted of income tax evasion. He had served in the 31st and 32nd Canadian Parliaments.

One of Canada's earliest proponents of the move to a hydrogen economy, Gilchrist established a blue-ribbon panel of scientists, academics and industrialists to study the possible applications of hydrogen in 1985. The result of their studies was a report to Prime Minister Brian Mulroney entitled "Hydrogen - A National Mission for Canada", a report which is still considered the definitive analysis of the various ways in which hydrogen can be used in place of carbon-based fuels. Gilchrist subsequently moved to the Cobourg area. He turned to local politics and has been elected to the Kawartha Pine Ridge District School Board since 2001 and on which he has held a variety of positions, including Chair of the Program Committee and Chair of the Discipline Committee.

On 7 March 2008, several groups including the Kawartha Muslim Religious Association held a press conference in which they demanded Gilchrist's resignation after a letter of his was published in a local newspaper stating that "most" immigrants don't understand Canadian values and "bring their old-country feuds and hatreds to be paraded and re-fought on Canadian soil." Gilchrist rejected the call for his resignation saying, "Why should I? I'm not a racist. There was nothing racist about my letter."

Gilchrist was re-elected, for a fourth term, in October 2010 on a platform that focused on improved access to technology in the local schools. During that term, he successfully campaigned for the amalgamation of the two high schools in Cobourg, Ontario into one. The new high school, now known as Cobourg Collegiate Institute, is located at the site of the former Cobourg East Collegiate. As a consequence of the amalgamation, the new school received significant upgrades in both facilities and program offerings, making it one of the best equipped high schools in Ontario. Gilchrist was re-elected, for a fifth term, in October 2014 on a platform of bringing similar program upgrades to the other schools in his district.

Gilchrist founded the Cadet Corps in Peterborough, he was a Boy Scout leader for over 25 years and was a Rotarian for over 30 years. He is an ardent environmentalist and, in addition to his ongoing efforts to promote hydrogen technology, he has planted over 10,000 trees on his family farm in Northumberland County.

His son Steve Gilchrist was a Cabinet Minister in Ontario during the Mike Harris government.
