= William Wightman (Canadian politician) =

Canadian politician

William Hannum Wightman

Member of Parliament for Scarborough West
- In office 1979–1980
- Preceded by: Alan Martin
- Succeeded by: David Weatherhead

Personal details
- Born: April 23, 1929 Montreal, Quebec
- Died: February 28, 2017 (aged 87) Prince Edward County, Ontario
- Party: Progressive Conservative
- Spouse: Verna
- Children: 1
- Profession: Industrial relations

William Hannum Wightman (April 23, 1929 – February 28, 2017) was a Canadian politician. He was a member of the House of Commons of Canada from 1979 to 1980 who represented the east Toronto riding of Scarborough West.

== Background ==
Wightman was born in the Canadian province of Quebec in the city of Montreal; officially Montréal Québec. He earned a Bachelor's degree at Clarkson University in New York. He served for two years in the RCAF. He then earned a Master's degree in Labour Relations from Columbia University. Before and after his election, he served several private-sector companies in senior industrial relations capacities, and as a member of the Ontario Labour Relations Board. He died in Prince Edward County, Ontario in February 2017 at the age of 87.

== Politics ==
In 1979, he ran as the Progressive Conservative candidate in the riding of Scarborough West. He defeated Liberal incumbent Alan Gray Martin by 2,174 votes. He served as a backbench supporter of the short-lived minority government of Joe Clark. Wightman served as Parliamentary Secretary to the Minister of Labour. In 1980, he came in third place behind the winner, Liberal David Weatherhead and runner-up John Paul Harney.
