= David Weatherhead =

Canadian politician

David Bennington Weatherhead

Member of Parliament for Scarborough West
- In office 1980–1984
- Preceded by: William Wightman
- Succeeded by: Reg Stackhouse

Member of Parliament for Scarborough West
- In office 1968–1972
- Preceded by: Riding established
- Succeeded by: John Paul Harney

Personal details
- Born: February 19, 1928 Toronto, Ontario
- Died: March 25, 2012 (aged 84) Toronto, Ontario
- Party: Liberal
- Profession: Lawyer

David Bennington Weatherhead (19 February 1928 – 25 March 2012) was a Canadian lawyer, barrister and politician. Weatherhead was a Liberal party member of the House of Commons of Canada.

He represented the Ontario riding of Scarborough West on two occasions, for the 28th Canadian Parliament where he won in the 1968 federal election, and for the 32nd Parliament where he won the 1980 election. Weatherhead was defeated after each of these Parliamentary terms. He died in 2012.
