= Robert Hicks (Canadian politician) =

Canadian politician

Robert Nelson David Hicks

Member of Parliament for Scarborough East
- In office 1984–1993
- Preceded by: Gordon Gilchrist
- Succeeded by: Douglas Peters

Personal details
- Born: 4 June 1933 Toronto, Ontario
- Died: 25 November 2014 (aged 81) Bracebridge, Ontario
- Party: Progressive Conservative
- Spouse: Joan Carolyn Chillman (m. 1954)
- Profession: Educator

Robert Nelson David Hicks (4 June 1933 – 25 November 2014) was a Progressive Conservative party member of the House of Commons of Canada. He became a teacher and school principal by career.

Hicks studied at McMaster University and the University of Ottawa. He was an educator and served as principal of Joseph Howe Senior Public School in Toronto.

He represented the Ontario riding of Scarborough East which he won in the 1984 federal election and was re-elected in 1988.

He served in the 32nd and 33rd Canadian Parliaments, then left national politics in 1993 and did not campaign in that year's federal election.

He died at the South Muskoka Memorial Hospital in Bracebridge, Ontario on 25 November 2014.
