= Dan Harris (politician) =

Canadian politician

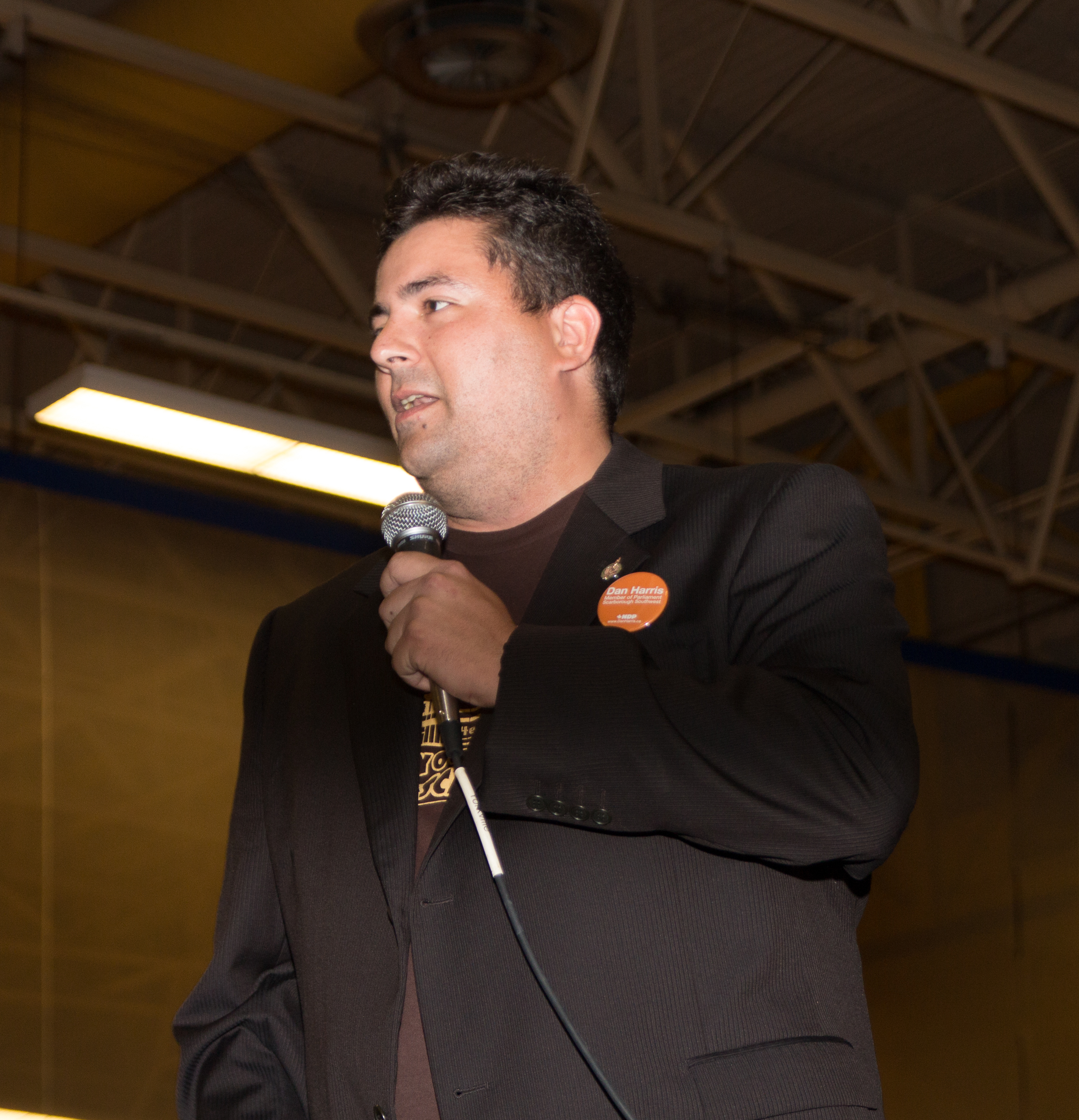
- Harris in July 2013

Member of Parliament for Scarborough Southwest
- In office May 2, 2011 – August 4, 2015
- Preceded by: Michelle Simson
- Succeeded by: Bill Blair

Personal details
- Born: August 3, 1979 (age 46) Toronto, Ontario
- Party: New Democratic Party
- Profession: IT technician

Dan Harris (born August 3, 1979) is a Canadian New Democratic Party politician, who represented the riding of Scarborough Southwest from 2011 to 2015. He served as the NDP's Critic for Post-Secondary Education.

== Background ==
Harris grew up in east end Toronto. Before being elected, he worked as an IT technician and "Site Lead for VoIP Services and Implementation" at the Kearl Oil Sands Project for Unified Systems Group. He has previously worked at the University of Toronto Students' Union as D.R.O. for their March 2010 Student Elections. As Web Coordinator at the Make-A-Wish Foundation in the summer of 2008. As a Manager of the Ontario NDP Fundraising PhoneBank in 2007–08. As the Support Team Leader at Web Networks 2001–2006 (part-time from 2005 to 2006 while attending classes). As a C.S.R. Telerep at Answer Plus (an inbound call centre) in 1999–2000. Harris also worked as a Jr. Assistant and Assistant at N.Y.A.D. Not Your Average Daycare from 1995 to 1999.

His father David Harris was a teacher in Scarborough for 28 years until he retired in 2015. His family has a military tradition, since his great-grandfather served in both world wars. His grandmother was in the Canadian Women's Army Corps. His great-uncle, Bill Riley, was in the service in the Second World War and served in Europe.

== Education ==
Harris attended French language schools in Toronto until college, graduating from elementary school at École George Étienne Cartier in Toronto and École Secondaire Catholique Mgr-de-Charbonnel in North Toronto for secondary school. He also attended Seneca College, studying computer programming and analysis. In the fall of 2016 he took a graphic design program at Concordia University.

== Politics ==
Harris first ran for office during the 2000 election in Scarborough Southwest, placing fourth behind Liberal incumbent Tom Wappel. He tried again in the 2004 and 2006 elections, and also ran for Ward 35 in the 2006 Toronto municipal elections. Harris did not contest the 2008 federal election, but tried again in 2011—this time defeating Liberal incumbent Michelle Simson.

Harris was named Deputy Critic for Science and Technology on June 2, 2011. In the summer of 2012 Harris was named Deputy Industry Critic then on August 9, 2013, he became the Critic for Post-Secondary Education.

In February 2015 Harris was among a group of NDP MPs accused by the Board of Internal Economy (BOIE) of misspending taxpayers dollars by funding NDP satellite offices after the 2011 election. Harris was initially ordered to pay back $141,467 to Canadian taxpayers. The NDP indicated its intention to challenge the ruling in federal court. In December 2015 Harris was exonerated by the House of Commons after providing proof that the Liberal and Conservative dominated BOIE had improperly charged him for staff working in his constituency office doing parliamentary work.

In the 2015 Canadian federal election, Harris lost his riding to former Toronto Police Chief Bill Blair.

== Electoral record ==
2015 Canadian federal election: Scarborough Southwest
Party	Candidate	Votes	%	±%	Expenditures
Liberal	Bill Blair	25,586	52.47	+23.13	$153,155.47
New Democratic	Dan Harris	11,574	23.73	-11.13	$48,940.84
Conservative	Roshan Nallaratnam	10,347	21.22	-10.46	$64,631.85
Green	Tommy Taylor	1,259	2.58	-1.48	$5,572.61
Total valid votes/expense limit		48,766	99.44		$205,220.58
Total rejected ballots		277	0.56	–	
Turnout		49,043	66.65	–	
Eligible voters		73,580			
Liberal gain from New Democratic		Swing		+17.13	
Source: Elections Canada

2011 Canadian federal election
Party	Candidate	Votes	%	±%	Expenditures
New Democratic	Dan Harris	14,113	35.04%	+16.29%	
Conservative	Gavan Paranchothy	12,828	31.85%	+2.34%	
Liberal	Michelle Simson	11,701	29.05%	-12.77%	
Green	Stefan Dixon	1,636	4.06	-5.43%	
Total valid votes		40,278	100%		
Turnout		–	59.1%		

2006 Canadian federal election: Scarborough Southwest
Party	Candidate	Votes	%	±%	Expenditures
Liberal	Tom Wappel	19,930	47.83	−1.63	$31,803
Conservative	Vincent Veerasuntharam	10,017	24.04	+0.26	$68,687
New Democratic	Dan Harris	9,626	23.10	+0.79	$18,101
Green	Valerie Philip	1,827	4.38	+0.38	
Independent	Trevor Sutton	147	0.35		
Communist	Elizabeth Rowley	120	0.29	−0.15	$280
Total valid votes		41,667	99.55		
Total rejected ballots		189	0.45	−0.11	
Turnout		41,856	62.37	+5.21	
Electors on the lists		67,109			
Liberal hold		Swing		-0.94	
Sources: Official Results, Elections Canada and Financial Returns, Elections Canada.

2004 Canadian federal election: Scarborough Southwest
Party	Candidate	Votes	%	±%	Expenditures
Liberal	Tom Wappel	18,776	49.46	−10.36	$47,511
Conservative	Heather Jewell	9,028	23.78	−4.59	$63,040
New Democratic	Dan Harris	8,471	22.31	+12.05	$21,397
Green	Peter Van Dalen	1,520	4.00		not listed
Communist	Elizabeth Rowley	168	0.44		$300
Total valid votes		37,963	99.44		
Total rejected ballots		215	0.56		
Turnout		38,178	57.16		
Electors on the lists		66,797			
Liberal hold		Swing		-2.88	
Percentage change figures are factored for redistribution. Conservative Party percentages are contrasted with the combined Canadian Alliance and Progressive Conservative percentages from 2000.
Sources: Official Results, Elections Canada and Financial Returns, Elections Canada.

2000 Canadian federal election: Scarborough Southwest
Party	Candidate	Votes	%	±%	Expenditures
Liberal	Tom Wappel	21,466	60.01	+6.61	$47,146
Progressive Conservative	Ellery Hollingsworth	5,251	14.68	+1.01	$14,019
Alliance	Nabil El-Khazen	4,912	13.73	−6.72	$30,429
New Democratic	Dan Harris	3,638	10.17	−1.05	$10,666
Canadian Action	Walter Aolari	336	0.94		$4,886
Communist	Dora Stewart	165	0.46		$202
Total valid votes		35,768	99.34		
Total rejected ballots		237	0.66	−0.04	
Turnout		36,005	53.43	−9.52	
Electors on the lists		67,382			
Sources: Official Results, Elections Canada and Financial Returns, Elections Canada.
Liberal hold		Swing		+2.80	
