= John Paul Harney =

Canadian politician (1931–2021)

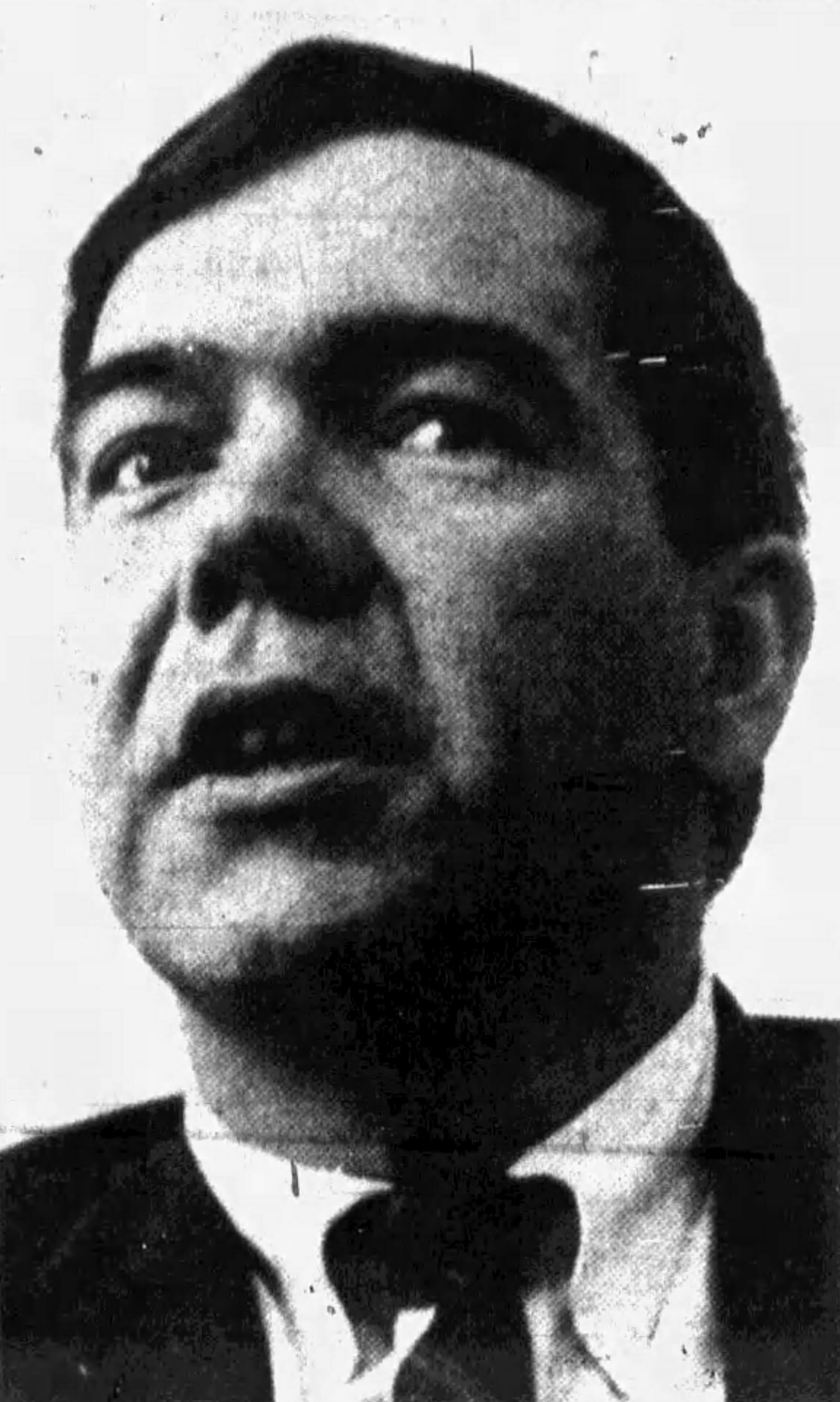
- Harney in 1968

Member of Parliament for Scarborough West
- In office October 30, 1972 – July 7, 1974
- Preceded by: David Weatherhead
- Succeeded by: Alan Martin

Personal details
- Born: John Paul Ludger Harney; February 2, 1931 Quebec City, Quebec, Canada
- Died: October 4, 2021 (aged 90) Picton, Ontario, Canada
- Party: New Democrat
- Parent(s): William Harney, Blanche Lemieux
- Education: Queen's University
- Profession: Poet, Politician, Professor,

John Paul Ludger Harney, also known as Jean-Paul Harney, (February 2, 1931 – October 4, 2021) was a Canadian professor and politician.

== Academic life ==
After completing his M.A. at Queen's University in 1961, he became an assistant professor of English at the Ontario Agricultural College in Guelph, Ontario, and taught there until 1966. He was also a poet, and gave readings at the Guelph Public Library. In 1970, he became a humanities professor at York University, and a professor of Canadian studies until 1998.

== Political career ==
Harney ran as a candidate for the New Democratic Party throughout the 1960s, 1970s and 1980s.

In 1962, 1963, and 1965, he stood as a candidate for the House of Commons of Canada in Wellington South. (Note: Since 1898, it had been the policy of the provincial government that no civil servant, under any condition, could ever be involved in politics. As the Ontario Agricultural College was then a branch of the Ontario Department of Agriculture, Harney was subject to the policy. The ensuing controversy in 1962 was resolved when Premier John Robarts announced that civil servants would be entitled to take a leave of absence in order to campaign.) After moving to Toronto, he then stood once more as a candidate in Scarborough West in the 1968 federal election. He won a seat in the House of Commons in the 1972 federal election, but was defeated in 1974. He continued to campaign in subsequent elections there up to 1980. In addition, he sought the NDP nomination in the 1978 federal byelection for Broadview, but lost out to Bob Rae.

He was the Provincial Secretary for the Ontario New Democratic Party from 1966 to 1970. In that time, he was also the campaign manager for that party's breakthrough campaign in the 1967 general election.

He campaigned to become national leader at the NDP's 1971 leadership convention, coming in third behind winner David Lewis and runner-up James Laxer. He stood as a candidate again at the 1975 leadership convention, where he got as far as the second ballot, coming in fourth. In 1981, he became involved in party debates concerning the forthcoming adoption of the Canadian Charter of Rights and Freedoms, arguing that it was silent about labour rights to organize, strike and bargain.

Born in Quebec and fluently bilingual, Harney returned to the province and became leader of the Quebec wing of the federal NDP in 1984. He continued to teach at York University, while living in Sillery. He led the relaunching of the New Democratic Party of Quebec as a provincial party in 1985 but was unable to win a seat either in the federal House of Commons (running in Lévis in two elections) or in the Quebec National Assembly (running in Louis-Hébert). In Quebec, he went by "Jean-Paul".

Late in the 1988 federal election campaign, he was one of seven candidates who took part in a press conference in which they supported using the notwithstanding clause of the Canadian Constitution to protect Quebec's francophone culture and restrict the use of other languages. Some analysts believed that it cost the party support among Quebec's anglophones. He stepped down later that year. Although he favoured the Bloc Québécois position on Quebec sovereignty, he refused to consider becoming one of its candidates as long as it pursued independence from Canada.

Harney died in Picton, Ontario on October 4, 2021.

== Electoral record ==
=== Federal ===
==== Wellington South ====
1962 Canadian federal election: Wellington South
| Party | Candidate | Votes | % | ±% |
|---|---|---|---|---|
| Progressive Conservative | Alfred Hales | 11,345 | 42.0 | -17.4 |
| Liberal | Roy McVittie | 8,508 | 31.5 | -0.6 |
| New Democratic | John Paul Harney | 6,989 | 25.9 | 17.4 |
| Social Credit | Reginald Youd | 174 | 0.6 | 0.6 |
| Total valid votes | | 27,016 | 100.0 | |

1963 Canadian federal election: Wellington South
| Party | Candidate | Votes | % | ±% |
|---|---|---|---|---|
| Progressive Conservative | Alfred Hales | 11,350 | 39.7 | -2.3 |
| Liberal | Ralph Dent | 10,713 | 37.5 | 6.0 |
| New Democratic | John Paul Harney | 6,391 | 22.3 | -3.6 |
| Social Credit | Reginald Youd | 150 | 0.5 | -0.1 |
| Total valid votes | | 28,604 | 100.0 | |

1965 Canadian federal election: Wellington South
| Party | Candidate | Votes | % | ±% |
|---|---|---|---|---|
| Progressive Conservative | Alfred Hales | 11,264 | 38.8 | -0.9 |
| New Democratic | John Paul Harney | 9,190 | 31.6 | 7.3 |
| Liberal | Donald E. McFadzen | 8,595 | 29.6 | -7.9 |
| Total valid votes | | 29,049 | 100.0 | |

==== Scarborough West ====
1968 Canadian federal election
| Party | Candidate | Votes | % | ±% |
|---|---|---|---|---|
| Liberal | David WEATHERHEAD | 14,889 | 42.9 | |
| New Democratic | John Paul HARNEY | 12,473 | 35.9 | |
| Progressive Conservative | Herb CROSBY | 7,340 | 21.2 | |
| Total valid votes | | 34,702 | 100.00 | |

1972 Canadian federal election
| Party | Candidate | Votes | % | ±% |
|---|---|---|---|---|
| New Democratic | John Paul HARNEY | 15,028 | 36.4 | +0.5 |
| Liberal | David WEATHERHEAD | 13,635 | 33.0 | -9.9 |
| Progressive Conservative | Basil CLARK | 12,539 | 30.4 | +9.2 |
| Independent | Roger TENTREY | 103 | 0.2 | +0.2 |
| Total valid votes | | 41,305 | 100.00 | |

1974 Canadian federal election
| Party | Candidate | Votes | % | ±% |
|---|---|---|---|---|
| Liberal | Alan MARTIN | 13,702 | 36.6 | +3.6 |
| New Democratic | John Paul HARNEY | 12,298 | 32.8 | -3.6 |
| Progressive Conservative | Basil CLARK | 11,339 | 30.2 | -0.2 |
| Marxist–Leninist | Linda TURNBULL | 89 | 0.2 | +0.2 |
| Independent | Harold ROWBOTTOM | 61 | 0.2 | 0.0 |
| Total valid votes | | 37,489 | 100.00 | |

1979 Canadian federal election
| Party | Candidate | Votes | % | ±% |
|---|---|---|---|---|
| Progressive Conservative | Bill WIGHTMAN | 15,697 | 36.4 | +6.2 |
| Liberal | Alan MARTIN | 13,523 | 31.4 | -5.2 |
| New Democratic | John Paul HARNEY | 13,437 | 31.2 | -1.6 |
| Libertarian | D'Arcy J. CAIN | 257 | 0.6 | +0.6 |
| Communist | Tom BULL | 114 | 0.3 | +0.3 |
| Marxist–Leninist | Brenda MILLER | 56 | 0.1 | -0.1 |
| Total valid votes | | 43,084 | 100.00 | |

1980 Canadian federal election
| Party | Candidate | Votes | % | ±% |
|---|---|---|---|---|
| Liberal | David WEATHERHEAD | 14,316 | 35.1 | +3.7 |
| New Democratic | John Paul HARNEY | 13,146 | 32.2 | +1.0 |
| Progressive Conservative | Bill WIGHTMAN | 12,744 | 31.3 | -5.1 |
| Libertarian | D'Arcy J. CAIN | 401 | 1.0 | +0.4 |
| Communist | John MACLENNAN | 92 | 0.2 | -0.1 |
| Marxist–Leninist | Brenda MILLER | 66 | 0.2 | +0.1 |
| Total valid votes | | 40,765 | 100.00 | |

==== Lévis ====
1984 Canadian federal election
| Party | Candidate | Votes | % | ±% |
|---|---|---|---|---|
| Progressive Conservative | Gabriel Fontaine | 32,338 | 49.6 | |
| Liberal | Gaston Gourde | 17,283 | 26.4 | |
| New Democratic | Jean-Paul Harney | 12,076 | 18.5 | |
| Parti nationaliste | Antoine Dubé | 1,649 | 2.5 | |
| Rhinoceros | Raymond Emiliano Marquis | 1,630 | 2.5 | |
| Social Credit | Jean-Paul Rhéaume | 216 | 0.3 | |
| Total valid votes | | 65,192 | 100.0 | |

1988 Canadian federal election
| Party | Candidate | Votes | % | ±% |
|---|---|---|---|---|
| Progressive Conservative | Gabriel Fontaine | 33,673 | 57.4 | 7.8 |
| Liberal | Denis Sonier | 13,002 | 22.2 | -4.2 |
| New Democratic | Jean-Paul Harney | 11,501 | 19.6 | 1.1 |
| Social Credit | Jean-Paul Rhéaume | 445 | 0.8 | 0.5 |
| Total valid votes | | 58,621 | 100.0 | |

=== Quebec ===
==== Louis-Hébert ====
1985 Quebec general election
| Party | Candidate | Votes | % | ±% |
|---|---|---|---|---|
| Liberal | Réjean Doyon | 16,913 | 51.9 | -0.9 |
| Parti Québécois | Louise Beaudoin | 12,279 | 37.7 | -6.4 |
| New Democratic | Jean-Paul Harney | 2,798 | 8.6 | +8.6 |
| Progressive Conservative | Claudette J. Hethrington | 287 | 0.9 | +0.9 |
| Independent | Emmanuel Le Brasseur | 252 | 0.8 | +0.8 |
| Christian Socialist | Michel Durocher | 58 | 0.2 | +0.2 |
