= Strategic Innovation Fund =

Canadian government program

The Strategic Innovation Fund (SIF) is the program of Innovation, Science and Economic Development Canada designed to support the "Canadian innovation ecosystem," which includes providing "funding to innovative sectors" such as "advanced manufacturing, agri-food, clean technology, clean resources, digital industries, and health and biosciences." The SIF covers all sectors of the Canadian economy and is available to both for-profit and not-for profit organizations.

The company aims to support large-scale projects that help Canada's interests in the global knowledge-based economy, to promote clean growth, and the "advancement of Canada's strategic technological advantage." SIF attempts to provide a simpler application process and responsive assistance.

== History ==
Funded in the March 2017 Canadian federal budget and slated to last only five years, the SIF was introduced by Prime Minister Justin Trudeau and his 29th Canadian Ministry in July 2017. It was marketed as "A Simpler, More Flexible Tool to Grow Canada’s Economy," and accomplished this by "consolidat[ing] and simplify[ing] existing business innovation programming, in particular the Strategic Aerospace and Defence Initiative, Technology Demonstration Program, Automotive Innovation Fund and Automotive Supplier Innovation Program."

Since the 2018 Canadian federal budget, the SIF now only provides funds in chunks of over $10 million. In June that year, the SIF was the mechanism of support for the steel and aluminum industries of Canada when the Trump Administration placed customs duties on them.

In October 2018, Canadian Minister of Innovation, Science and Economic Development, Navdeep Bains, announced that the SIF would invest C$49.3 million in General Fusion. In December 2019, General Fusion raised $65 million in Series E equity financing from Singapore’s Temasek Holdings, Bezos Expeditions, and Chrysalix, concurrently with another $38 million from the SIF. The firm said that the funds would permit it to begin the design, construction, and operation of its Fusion Demonstration Plant.

On 20 March 2020, the Canadian government announced a plan to ramp up production of medical equipment, switching assembly lines to produce ventilators, masks, and other personal protective gear. Companies would be able to access funds through the SIF. Trudeau stated that Canadian medical supply firms Thornhill Medical, Medicom, and Spartan Bioscience were looking to expand production. To address shortages and supply-chain disruption, Canada passed emergency legislation that waived patent protection, giving government-selected companies or organizations the right to produce patented products without permission from the patent holder. According to the Bains, "the country's entire industrial policy will be refocused to prioritize the fight against COVID-19."

== Projects ==
Recent projects of SIF, as of September 2021, include:

- Natural Products Canada
- ArcelorMittal Dofasco G.P.
- Pratt & Whitney Canada
- Bell Textron Canada
- CAE Inc.

SIF projects by sector, as of August 2021
| Name(s) | Advanced manufacturing | Agrifood | "Resources of the future" | Health & biosciences | Clean technology | Digital industries |
|---|---|---|---|---|---|---|
| AbCellera Biologics Inc. | | | | x | | |
| Abraham Innovation Systems Inc. | **x** | | | | | x |
| Advantech Satellite Networks (now Spacebridge) | | | | | | x |
| Aerospace Innovation and Research Network (AIR) – (Aerospace Industries Association of Canada) | x | | | | | x |
| AGS Automotive Systems | **x** | | | | x | |
| Alcoa Lauralco Management Company | **x** | | | | | |
| Algoma Steel Inc. | **x** | | | | x | |
| Algoma Tubes Inc. and Prudential Steel Ltd. (Tenaris) | **x** | | | | | |
| Aluminerie Alouette Inc. | **x** | | x | | x | |
| ArcelorMittal Canada Inc. | **x** | | | | x | |
| ArcelorMittal Dofasco G.P. | **x** | | | | x | |
| Arch Biopartners Inc. | | | | x | | |
| Attabotics Inc. | **x** | | | | | x |
| Bell Helicopter Textron Canada Ltd and partners | **x** | | | | x | x |
| Bell Textron Canada | x | | | | **x** | |
| BioVectra | x | | | x | | |
| BlackBerry QNX | | | | | | **x** |
| Blue Solutions Canada Inc. | **x** | | | | x | |
| Bluedrop Performance Learning Inc. | | | | | | **x** |
| Burloak Technologies | **x** | | | | | x |
| CAE Inc. | x | | | | x | **x** |
| Canada Kuwait Petrochemical Corp. | | | **x** | | x | |
| Canadian Agri-Food Automation and Intelligence Network (CAAIN) | | **x** | | | | x |
| Canadian Food Innovators Network (CFIN) | | **x** | | | | x |
| Carbon Engineering Ltd. | | | **x** | | x | |
| CBN Nano Technologies Inc. and Canadian Bank Note Company, Ltd | **x** | | | | | |
| Centre for Excellence in Mining Innovation | | | **x** | | x | |
| Clean Resource Innovation Network | | | x | | **x** | |
| Cognitive Systems Corp. | | | | | | **x** |
| Coulson Aircrane Ltd. | **x** | | | | | |
| Creative Destruction Lab | | | | | | **x** |
| Digital Health and Discovery Platform (DHDP) - Terry Fox Research Institute / Imagia | | | | x | | x |
| D-Wave Systems Inc. | | | | | | **x** |
| Domtar Inc. | **x** | | | | x | |
| Edesa Biotech Research, Inc. | | | | x | | |
| Elysis Limited Partnership | **x** | | | | x | |
| EVRAZ | **x** | | x | | | |
| exactEarth | | | | | | **x** |
| General Fusion | | | | | **x** | x |
| Gerdau Ameristeel Corporation | **x** | | | | x | |
| Heico Canada Holding Company | **x** | | | | | |
| High Q | | | | x | | x |
| Immune Biosolutions Inc. | | | | x | | |
| Industry Consortium for Image Guided Therapy (ICIGT) - Sunnybrook Research Institute | | | | x | | x |
| Innovation ENCQOR | | | | | | **x** |
| Inter Pipeline | x | | **x** | | x | |
| ISARACorporation | | | | | | **x** |
| JP Bowman Ltd. | **x** | | | | x | |
| KABS Laboratories Inc. | | | | x | | |
| Kruger Inc. | x | | **x** | | x | |
| Lakeside Plastics Ltd. | **x** | | | | x | |
| Linamar Corporation | **x** | | | | x | |
| LNG Canada Development Inc. | **x** | | x | | x | |
| Maple Leaf Foods Inc. | x | **x** | | | | |
| Marwood Metal Fabrication Ltd. | **x** | | | | x | |
| Mastercard Technologies Canada ULC | | | | | | **x** |
| Medicago Inc. | | | | x | | |
| Meltech Innovation Canada Inc. | | | | x | | |
| Meridian Lightweight Technologies Inc. | **x** | | | | x | |
| MindBridge Analytics Inc. | | | | | | **x** |
| Moltex Energy Canada Inc. | | | | | **x** | |
| Natural Products Canada | | **x** | | | x | |
| Nokia | | | | | | **x** |
| Northstar | | x | | | | **x** |
| NOVA Chemicals | x | | **x** | | x | |
| Nova Steel Inc. | **x** | | | | x | x |
| Nova Tube Inc. | **x** | | | | | |
| Novocol Pharmaceutical of Canada | | | | x | | |
| Origin Materials Canada Holding Ltd. | | | | | **x** | |
| Pratt & Whitney Canada | x | | | | **x** | |
| Precision NanoSystems Inc. | | | | x | | |
| Ranovus | x | | | | x | **x** |
| Redline Communications Inc. | | | | | | **x** |
| Resilience Biotechnologies Inc. | | | | x | | |
| Rockport Networks Inc. | | | | | **x** | x |
| Sanofi Pasteur Limited | | | | x | | |
| Sciemetric Instruments Inc. | x | | | | | **x** |
| Siemens Canada | **x** | | x | | x | x |
| Stelco Inc. | **x** | | | | | |
| STEMCELL Technologies | x | | | | | |
| SWITCH Materials Inc. | **x** | | | | x | |
| Synergx Technologies Inc. | **x** | | | | | x |
| Svante Inc. | | | | | **x** | |
| Tekna Plasma Systems | **x** | | x | | | |
| Telesat Canada | | | | | | **x** |
| Terrestrial Energy Inc. | | | x | | **x** | |
| The Lion Electric Co. | **x** | | | | x | |
| Toyota Motor Manufacturing Canada | **x** | | | | x | |
| Variation Biotechnologies Inc. | | | | x | | |
| Volvo Group Canada Inc. | **x** | | | | x | |
| Woodbridge Foam Corporation | **x** | | | | | |
| 3M Canada Company | | | | x | | |

Primary sector of company in bold ("x")

=== Medical Countermeasures projects ===
In the wake of the COVID-19 pandemic, the SIF was designated by the Canadian government in March 2020 to deliver the Medical Countermeasures (MCM) initiative and was given authority to invest $792 million to fund clinical trials and manufacturing capacity at scale. The MCM funding stream is divided into three types of projects: vaccines, therapies, and biomanufacturing projects.

Announced MCM projects
| Project name | Province | SIF contribution (CAD) | Total project cost (CAD) | Announcement date | Type |
|---|---|---|---|---|---|
| Abcellera Biologics Inc. | BC | $175,631,000 | $287,353,000 | 2020-05-03 | Therapeutics and biomanufacturing |
| Variation Biotechnologies Inc. (VBI) | ON | $55,976,000 | $74,636,000 | 2020-08-05 | Vaccines |
| Precision NanoSystems Inc. | BC | $18,203,000 | $24,271,000 | 2020-10-23 | Vaccines |
| Medicago Inc. | QC | $173,000,000 | $428,002,000 | 2020-10-23 | Vaccines and biomanufacturing |
| Arch BioPartners | ON | $6,715,000 | $8,953,000 | 2020-12-15 | Therapeutics |
| Edesa Biotech Research, Inc. | ON | $14,053,000 | $18,738,000 | 2021-02-02 | Therapeutics |
| Precision NanoSystems Inc. | BC | $25,112,000 | $50,224,000 | 2021-02-02 | Biomanufacturing |
| KABS Laboratories Inc. | QC | $54,209,000 | $84,843,000 | 2021-03-16 | Biomanufacturing |
| Novocol Pharmaceutical of Canada | ON | $32,716,000 | $72,632,000 | 2021-03-16 | Biomanufacturing |
| Immune Biosolutions Inc. | QC | $13,442,000 | $18,670,000 | 2021-03-16 | Therapeutics |
| Resilience Biotechnologies Inc. | ON | $199,159,000 | $401,518,000 | 2021-05-18 | Biomanufacturing |
| Total | | $768,216,000 | $1,469,840,000 | | |
