= Michelle Simson =

Canadian politician (1953–2025)

Michelle Simson MP

Member of Parliament for Scarborough Southwest
- In office 2008–2011
- Preceded by: Tom Wappel
- Succeeded by: Dan Harris

Personal details
- Born: July 10, 1953 Toronto, Canada
- Died: December 10, 2025 (aged 72) Kingston, Ontario, Canada
- Party: Liberal
- Spouse: George Simson
- Profession: Vice-President and Manager

Michelle Simson (July 10, 1953 – December 10, 2025) was a Canadian politician, who was elected to represent the Ontario electoral district of Scarborough Southwest as a Member of Parliament from 2008 through 2011. She was a member of the Liberal Party.

Before being elected as an MP, she was the vice-president and general manager of a leasing firm located in Scarborough and was a former president of the Ontario Women's Liberal Commission.

After the election, Simson was a member of the Standing Committee on Access to Information, Privacy and Ethics and an associate member of the Standing Committee on Citizenship and Immigration, Standing Committee on Justice and Human Rights. She also sat as a member of the Standing Committee on the Status of Women.

She was also the co-chair of the National Liberal Caucus Communications Committee and Treasurer of the GTA/Ontario Liberal Caucus.

== Political career (2008–2011) ==
On July 7, 2009, Simson made history by becoming the first federal politician in Canada to publicize her claimed expenses for the fiscal year on her website, saying:

"I have been a taxpayer a lot longer than I ever have been an MP, and as a taxpayer this was a real bone of contention. ... It was all about accountability. I may not succeed, but in my little piece of the world, my constituents can go on my website and will be able to see how the money is spent. It's their money. That's the bottom line."

On November 6, 2009, Simson's motion M-354, which called upon the government to develop and adopt a Universal Declaration on Animal Welfare, was unanimously adopted.

"This declaration is an agreement among people and nations to recognize that animals are sentient, suffer, have welfare needs, and to ultimately end animal cruelty worldwide. Thousands of Canadians have signed petitions in support of a UDAW and this declaration is actively supported by Canada's foremost animal protection organizations."

Simson was also a founding member and co-chair of the Parliamentary Committee on palliative and Compassionate Care (PCPCC), a non-partisan Parliamentary group aimed at promoting awareness of glaring deficiences in Canada's palliative and compassionate care framework.

After serving for just over two-and-a-half years as an MP, Simson ran for re-election in her Scarborough Southwest riding in 2011. She was defeated, coming in third.

== Personal life and death ==
Simson was married to George, and they had one son, Eric. She died in Kingston, Ontario on December 10, 2025, at the age of 72.

== Electoral record ==
2011 Canadian federal election
Party	Candidate	Votes	%	±%	Expenditures
New Democratic	Dan Harris	14,119	35.04	+16.29	
Conservative	Gavan Paranchothy	12,830	31.85	+2.34	
Liberal	Michelle Simson	11,699	29.05	-12.77	
Green	Stefan Dixon	1,635	4.06	-5.43	
Total valid votes/Expense limit		40,283	100.00		
Total rejected ballots		218	0.54	+0.01	
Turnout		40,501	59.45	+4.71	
Eligible voters		68,122	–	–	

2008 Canadian federal election
Party	Candidate	Votes	%	±%	Expenditures
Liberal	Michelle Simson	15,486	41.82	-6.06	$61,923
Conservative	Greg Crompton	10,928	29.51	+5.37	$52,973
New Democratic	Alamgir Hussain	6,943	18.75	-4.15	$22,985
Green	Stefan Dixon	3,514	9.49	+5.08	$588
Independent	M. H. Fatique Chowdhury Kabir	151	0.40	–	
Total valid votes/Expense limit		37,022	100.00	$80,366	
Total rejected ballots		195	0.52	+0.07	
Turnout		37,217	54.74	-7.63	
Eligible voters		67,988	–	–	
Liberal hold		Swing	-5.7		
