= Scarborough Southwest (federal electoral district) =

Federal electoral district in Ontario, Canada

Coordinates: 43.692°N 79.274°W

Ontario electoral district
- Interactive map of riding boundaries from the 2025 federal election

Federal electoral district
- Legislature: House of Commons
MP
Doly Begum
Liberal
- District created: 1966
- First contested: 1968
- Last contested: 2025
- District webpage: profile, map

Demographics
- Population (2021): 111,994
- Electors (2019): 78,246
- Area (km²): 29
- Pop. density (per km²): 3,861.9
- Census division: Toronto
- Census subdivision: Toronto (part)

Scarborough Southwest (French: Scarborough-Sud-Ouest) is a federal electoral district in Toronto, Ontario, Canada, that has been represented in the House of Commons of Canada since 1968.

== Geography ==
It covers the southwestern part of the Scarborough part of Toronto. It stretches from Lake Ontario in the south to Eglinton Avenue in the north.

It consists of the part of the City of Toronto bounded on the west by Victoria Park Avenue, on the south by Lake Ontario, on the north by Eglinton Avenue and on the east by Markham Road.

The riding includes the neighbourhoods of Birch Cliff, Oakridge, Cliffside, Kennedy Park, Clairlea, Cliffcrest and parts of Scarborough Village and the Golden Mile.

== History ==
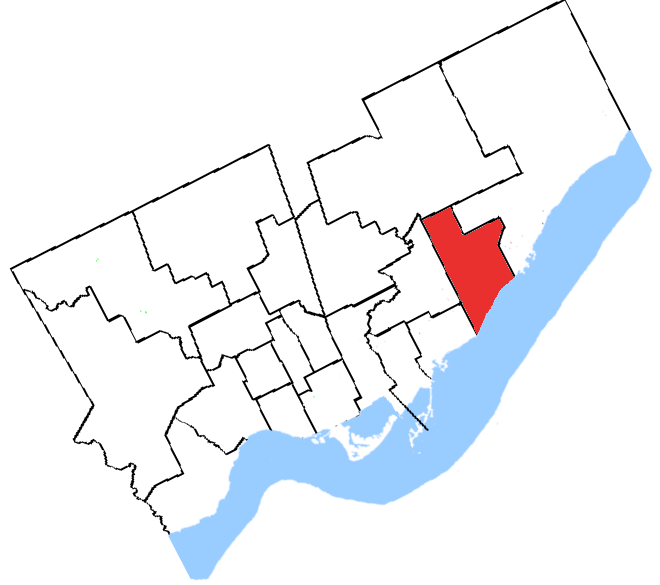
1966 to 1976

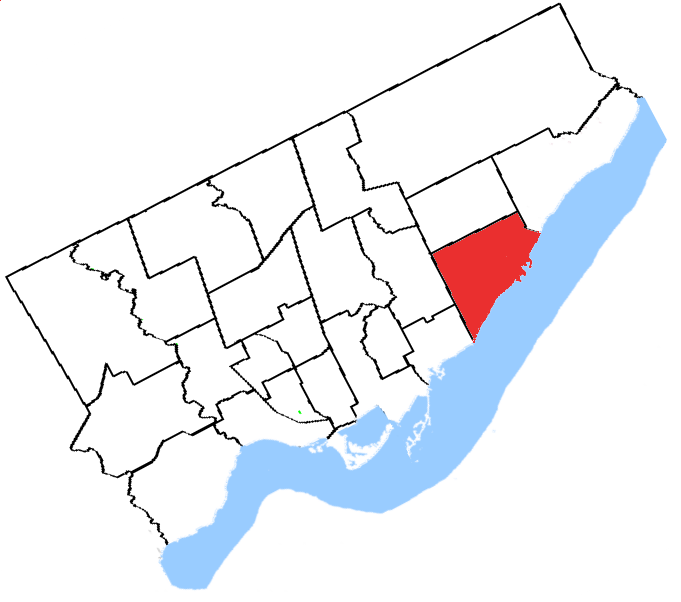
1976 to 1987

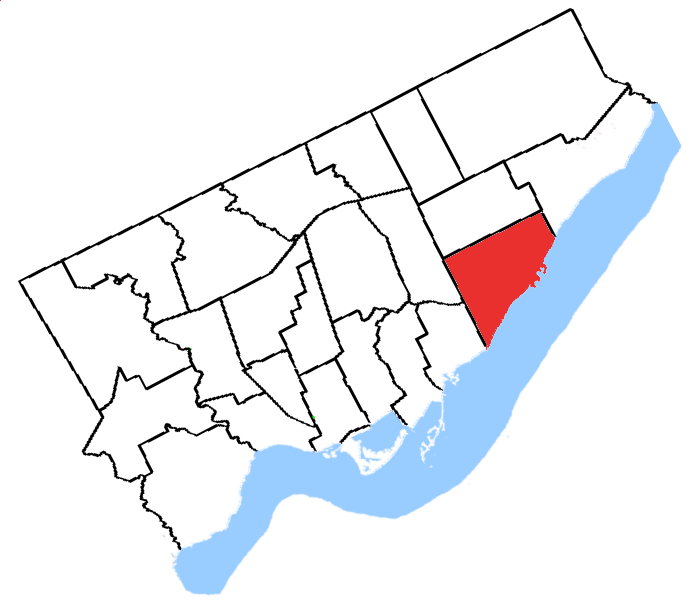
1987 to 1996

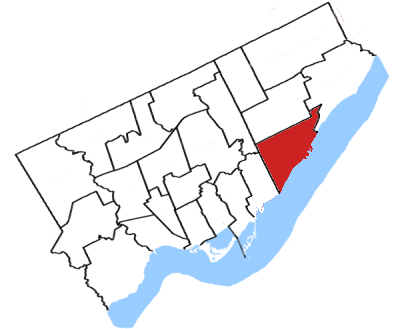
1996 to 2003

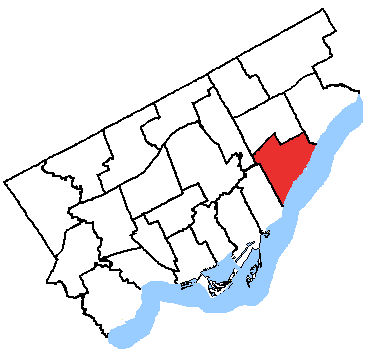
2003 to 2013

Scarborough West riding was created in 1966 and from parts of Danforth and York—Scarborough ridings.

It initially consisted of the part of the borough of Scarborough west of a line formed by Midland Avenue the Canadian National Railway line and Brimley Road and south of Eglinton Avenue. It also included the part of the city west of Birchmount Road and south of Lawrence Avenue East.

In 1976, it was redefined to consist of the part of the Borough of Scarborough south Eglinton Avenue East and west of Bellamy Road South, and the part south of Kingston Road and east of Bellamy Ravine Creek.

In 1987, it was redefined to consist of the part of the City of Scarborough south Eglinton Avenue East and west of Markham Road.

The electoral district was abolished in 1996 when it was redistributed when almost all of the riding was transferred to Scarborough Southwest riding.

A new riding named Scarborough Southwest was created out of Scarborough West and a small part of Scarborough East in 1996. It consisted initially of the part of the City of Scarborough lying south and west of a line drawn from the western city limit east along Eglinton Avenue East, north along Markham Road, east along the Canadian National Railway, southwest along Kingston Road, south along Scarborough Golf Club Road, southwest along Hill Crescent, southeast along Bellamy Ravine Creek.

This riding lost territory to Scarborough Centre and gained territory from Scarborough-Guildwood during the 2012 electoral redistribution.

== Demographics ==
According to the 2021 Canadian census

Ethnic groups: 37.0% White, 24.8% South Asian, 12.3% Black, 8.6% Filipino, 5.1% Chinese, 1.7% West Asian, 1.6% Indigenous, 1.6% Latin American, 1.0% Arab, 1.0% Southeast Asian

Languages: 54.2% English, 8.0% Bengali, 4.1% Tagalog, 2.4% Tamil, 2.3% Cantonese, 1.9% Urdu, 1.4% Mandarin, 1.3% Spanish, 1.1% Greek, 1.1% Amharic, 1.0% French

Religions: 46.5% Christian (23.0% Catholic, 4.3% Christian Orthodox, 3.0% Anglican, 2.1% United Church, 1.2% Pentecostal, 12.9% Other), 18.1% Muslim, 8.4% Hindu, 1.4% Buddhist, 24.4% None

Median income: $35,600 (2020)

Average income: $49,160 (2020)

== Member of Parliament ==
This riding has elected the following members of the House of Commons of Canada:

Parliament	Years	Member	Party
Scarborough West; Riding created from York—Scarborough and Danforth
28th	1968–1972	David Weatherhead	Liberal
29th	1972–1974	John Paul Harney	New Democratic
30th	1974–1979	Alan Gray Martin	Liberal
31st	1979–1980	William Wightman	Progressive Conservative
32nd	1980–1984	David Weatherhead	Liberal
33rd	1984–1988	Reg Stackhouse	Progressive Conservative
34th	1988–1993	Tom Wappel	Liberal
35th	1993–1997	Tom Wappel	Liberal
Scarborough Southwest
36th	1997–2000	Tom Wappel	Liberal
37th	2000–2004	Tom Wappel	Liberal
38th	2004–2006	Tom Wappel	Liberal
39th	2006–2008	Tom Wappel	Liberal
40th	2008–2011	Michelle Simson	Liberal
41st	2011–2015	Dan Harris	New Democratic
42nd	2015–2019	Bill Blair	Liberal
43rd	2019–2021	Bill Blair	Liberal
44th	2021–2025	Bill Blair	Liberal
45th	2025–2026	Bill Blair	Liberal
45th	2026–present	Doly Begum	Liberal

== Election results ==
All electoral information is taken from Elections Canada. Italicized expenditures from elections after 1997 refer to candidate submissions, and are presented when the final reviewed totals are not available. Expenditures from 1997 refer to submitted totals. The ± figures from 1997 and 2004 are adjusted for redistribution.

Graph of election results in Scarborough Southwest since 1968 (parties that never received 2% of the vote are omitted)

=== Scarborough Southwest (1997–present) ===
Canadian federal by-election, April 13, 2026 Resignation of Bill Blair
Party	Candidate	Votes	%	±%
Liberal	Doly Begum	20,121	69.60	+8.12
Conservative	Diana Filipova	5,433	18.79	–11.77
New Democratic	Fatima Shaban	1,714	5.92	+0.92
Green	Pooja Malhotra	711	2.46	+1.08
Independent	April Francisco	422	1.50	N/A
People's	Peter Koubakis	265	0.92	-0.12
Christian Heritage	David Vedova	143	0.49	N/A
Centrist	Lyall Sanders	100	0.35	+0.04
Total valid votes		28,909		
Total rejected ballots		89		
Turnout		28,998	33.80	–29.52
Eligible voters		85,796		
Liberal hold		Swing		+8.12
Source: Elections Canada

2025 Canadian federal election
Party	Candidate	Votes	%	±%
Liberal	Bill Blair	33,495	61.49	+3.53
Conservative	Asm Tarun	16,652	30.57	+9.98
New Democratic	Fatima Shaban	2,730	5.01	–10.97
Green	Amanda Cain	754	1.38	–0.87
People's	Michael Poulin	567	1.04	–1.84
Centrist	Imran Khan	165	0.30	+0.28
Marxist–Leninist	Christine Nugent	113	0.21	N/A
Total valid votes		54,476	99.52	
Total rejected ballots		264	0.48	-0.28
Turnout		54,740	63.32	+6.14
Eligible voters		86,452		
Liberal notional hold		Swing		–3.22
Source: Elections Canada

2021 federal election redistributed results
Party	Vote	%
Liberal	27,464	57.96
Conservative	9,758	20.59
New Democratic	7,575	15.99
People's	1,367	2.88
Green	1,068	2.25
Independent	145	0.31
Centrist	10	0.02
Total valid votes	47,387	99.24
Rejected ballots	363	0.76
Registered voters/ estimated turnout	83,517	57.17

2021 Canadian federal election
Party	Candidate	Votes	%	±%	Expenditures
Liberal	Bill Blair	24,823	57.50	+0.29	$59,762.16
Conservative	Mohsin Bhuiyan	8,981	20.80	+0.06	$74,180.31
New Democratic	Guled Arale	6,924	16.04	+0.51	$33,149.66
People's	Ramona Pache	1,259	2.92	+1.75	$2,513.29
Green	Amanda Cain	1,068	2.47	-2.42	$1,982.23
Independent	David Edward-Ooi Poon	117	0.27	N/A	$0.00
Total valid votes/expense limit		43,172	99.25	–	$109,258.84
Total rejected ballots		325	0.75	-0.13	
Turnout		43,497	56.82	-7.61	
Eligible voters		76,558			
Liberal hold		Swing		+0.12	
Source: Elections Canada

2019 Canadian federal election
Party	Candidate	Votes	%	±%	Expenditures
Liberal	Bill Blair	28,965	57.20	+4.74	$59,424.78
Conservative	Kimberly Fawcett Smith	10,502	20.74	-0.48	$31,378.91
New Democratic	Keith McCrady	7,865	15.53	-8.20	$32,226.21
Green	Amanda Cain	2,477	4.89	+2.31	$4,140.81
People's	Italo Eratostene	590	1.17		$5,716.04
Animal Protection	Simon Luisi	236	0.47		none listed
Total valid votes/expense limit		50,635	99.12		
Total rejected ballots		449	0.88	+0.31	
Turnout		51,084	65.43	-2.23	
Eligible voters		79,291			
Liberal hold		Swing		+2.61	
Source: Elections Canada

2015 Canadian federal election
Party	Candidate	Votes	%	±%	Expenditures
Liberal	Bill Blair	25,586	52.47	+23.13	$153,155.47
New Democratic	Dan Harris	11,574	23.73	-11.13	$48,940.84
Conservative	Roshan Nallaratnam	10,347	21.22	-10.46	$64,631.85
Green	Tommy Taylor	1,259	2.58	-1.48	$5,572.61
Total valid votes/expense limit		48,766	99.44		$205,220.58
Total rejected ballots		277	0.56	–	
Turnout		49,043	66.65	–	
Eligible voters		73,580			
Liberal gain from New Democratic		Swing		+17.13	
Source: Elections Canada

2011 federal election redistributed results
Party	Vote	%
New Democratic	13,731	34.87
Conservative	12,474	31.68
Liberal	11,554	29.34
Green	1,600	4.06
Others	20	0.05

2011 Canadian federal election
Party	Candidate	Votes	%	±%
New Democratic	Dan Harris	14,119	35.05	+16.30
Conservative	Gavan Paranchothy	12,830	31.85	+2.33
Liberal	Michelle Simson	11,699	29.04	-12.79
Green	Stefan Dixon	1,635	4.06	-5.43
Total valid votes		40,283	99.46	
Total rejected ballots		218	0.54	+0.01
Turnout		40,501	58.37	+3.63
Eligible voters		68,389	–	–
New Democratic gain from Liberal		Swing		+14.54

2008 Canadian federal election
Party	Candidate	Votes	%	±%	Expenditures
Liberal	Michelle Simson	15,486	41.83	-6.00	$61,923
Conservative	Greg Crompton	10,928	29.52	+5.48	$52,973
New Democratic	Alamgir Hussain	6,943	18.75	-4.35	$22,985
Green	Stefan Dixon	3,514	9.49	+5.11	$588
Independent	M. H. Fatique Chowdhury Kabir	151	0.41	–	
Total valid votes/Expense limit		37,022	99.48	–	$80,366
Total rejected ballots		195	0.52	+0.07	–
Turnout		37,217	54.74	-7.63	–
Eligible voters		67,988	–	–	–
Liberal hold		Swing		-5.74	

2006 Canadian federal election
Party	Candidate	Votes	%	±%	Expenditures
Liberal	Tom Wappel	19,930	47.83	−1.63	$31,803
Conservative	Vincent Veerasuntharam	10,017	24.04	+0.26	$68,687
New Democratic	Dan Harris	9,626	23.10	+0.79	$18,101
Green	Valerie Philip	1,827	4.38	+0.38	
Independent	Trevor Sutton	147	0.35		
Communist	Elizabeth Rowley	120	0.29	−0.15	$280
Total valid votes		41,667	99.55		
Total rejected ballots		189	0.45	−0.11	
Turnout		41,856	62.37	+5.21	
Electors on the lists		67,109			
Liberal hold		Swing		-0.94	
Sources: Official Results, Elections Canada and Financial Returns, Elections Canada.

2004 Canadian federal election
Party	Candidate	Votes	%	±%	Expenditures
Liberal	Tom Wappel	18,776	49.46	−10.36	$47,511
Conservative	Heather Jewell	9,028	23.78	−4.59	$63,040
New Democratic	Dan Harris	8,471	22.31	+12.05	$21,397
Green	Peter Van Dalen	1,520	4.00		not listed
Communist	Elizabeth Rowley	168	0.44		$300
Total valid votes		37,963	99.44		
Total rejected ballots		215	0.56		
Turnout		38,178	57.16		
Electors on the lists		66,797			
Liberal hold		Swing		-2.88	
Percentage change figures are factored for redistribution. Conservative Party percentages are contrasted with the combined Canadian Alliance and Progressive Conservative percentages from 2000.
Sources: Official Results, Elections Canada and Financial Returns, Elections Canada.

2000 federal election redistributed results
Party	Vote	%
Liberal	20,245	59.82
Canadian Alliance	4,970	14.68
Progressive Conservative	4,633	13.69
New Democratic	3,474	10.26
Others	523	1.55

2000 Canadian federal election
Party	Candidate	Votes	%	±%	Expenditures
Liberal	Tom Wappel	21,466	60.01	+6.61	$47,146
Progressive Conservative	Ellery Hollingsworth	5,251	14.68	+1.01	$14,019
Alliance	Nabil El-Khazen	4,912	13.73	−6.72	$30,429
New Democratic	Dan Harris	3,638	10.17	−1.05	$10,666
Canadian Action	Walter Aolari	336	0.94		$4,886
Communist	Dora Stewart	165	0.46		$202
Total valid votes		35,768	99.34		
Total rejected ballots		237	0.66	−0.04	
Turnout		36,005	53.43	−9.52	
Electors on the lists		67,382			
Sources: Official Results, Elections Canada and Financial Returns, Elections Canada.
Liberal hold		Swing		+2.80	

1997 Canadian federal election
Party	Candidate	Votes	%	±%	Expenditures
Liberal	Tom Wappel	20,675	53.40	−1.34	$35,520
Reform	Tom Ambas	7,918	20.45	−0.69	$41,884
Progressive Conservative	Brian McCutcheon	5,294	13.67	−0.59	$16,872
New Democratic	Dave Gracey	4,345	11.22	+4.26	$7,984
Green	David James Cooper	482	1.25		$0.00
Total valid votes		38,714	99.30		
Total rejected ballots		273	0.70		
Turnout		38,987	62.95		
Electors on the lists		61,932			
Liberal hold		Swing		–0.33	
Percentage change figures are factored for redistribution.
Sources: Official Results, Elections Canada and Financial Returns, Elections Canada.

1993 federal election redistributed results
Party	Vote	%
Liberal	22,462	54.75
Reform	8,673	21.14
Progressive Conservative	5,854	14.27
New Democratic	2,859	6.97
Others	1,181	2.88

=== Scarborough West (1968-1997) ===
1993 Canadian federal election
Party	Candidate	Votes	%	±%
Liberal	Tom Wappel	21,335	54.44	+17.64
Reform	Aubrey Millard	8,314	21.21	
Progressive Conservative	Reg Stackhouse	5,664	14.45	-21.30
New Democratic	Steve Thomas	2,771	7.07	-19.28
National	Greg Gogan	578	1.47	
Green	Jim MacLeod	276	0.70	
Natural Law	Ron Robins	212	0.54	
Abolitionist	Alfred Morton	40	0.10	
Total valid votes		39,190	99.12	
Total rejected ballots		346	0.88	
Turnout		39,536	64.21	
Eligible voters		61,574		
Liberal hold		Swing		–1.79
Source: Canadian Elections Database

1988 Canadian federal election
Party	Candidate	Votes	%	±%
Liberal	Tom Wappel	15,363	36.80	+7.2
Progressive Conservative	Reg Stackhouse	14,923	35.75	-5.4
New Democratic	Dave Gracey	11,000	26.35	-0.6
Libertarian	Anna Young	459	1.10	
Total valid votes		41,745	100.00	
Liberal gain from Progressive Conservative		Swing		+6.3

1984 federal election redistributed results
Party	%
Progressive Conservative	41.1
Liberal	29.6
New Democratic	27.0
Others	2.3

1984 Canadian federal election
Party	Candidate	Votes	%	±%
Progressive Conservative	Reg Stackhouse	17,028	40.92	+9.65
Liberal	David Weatherhead	12,230	29.39	-5.73
New Democratic	David Gracey	11,436	27.48	-4.77
Green	Laurie Gourlay	364	0.87	
Libertarian	D'Arcy J. Cain	330	0.79	-0.19
Commonwealth of Canada	David Harris	129	0.31	
Communist	Kerry McCuaig	99	0.24	+0.01
Total valid votes		41,616	99.34	
Total rejected ballots		278	0.66	+0.15
Turnout		41,894	75.35	+2.41
Eligible voters		55,598		
Progressive Conservative gain from Liberal		Swing		+7.69
Source: Canadian Elections Database

1980 Canadian federal election
Party	Candidate	Votes	%	±%
Liberal	David Weatherhead	14,316	35.12	+3.73
New Democratic	John Paul Harney	13,146	32.25	+1.06
Progressive Conservative	William Wightman	12,744	31.26	-5.17
Libertarian	D'Arcy J. Cain	401	0.98	+0.39
Communist	John MacLennan	92	0.23	-0.04
Marxist–Leninist	Brenda Miller	66	0.16	+0.03
Total valid votes		40,765	99.49	
Total rejected ballots		209	0.51	+0.02
Turnout		40,974	72.94	-7.14
Eligible voters		56,177		
Liberal gain from Progressive Conservative		Swing		-4.45
Source: Canadian Elections Database

1979 Canadian federal election
Party	Candidate	Votes	%	±%
Progressive Conservative	William Wightman	15,697	36.43	+5.15
Liberal	Alan Gray Martin	13,523	31.39	-6.73
New Democratic	John Paul Harney	13,437	31.19	+1.04
Libertarian	D'Arcy J. Cain	257	0.60	
Communist	Tom Bull	114	0.26	
Marxist–Leninist	Brenda Miller	56	0.13	
Total valid votes		43,084	99.51	
Total rejected ballots		214	0.49	
Turnout		43,298	80.08	
Eligible voters		54,068		
Progressive Conservative gain from Liberal		Swing		+5.94
Source: Canadian Elections Database

1974 federal election redistributed results
Party	%
Liberal	38.12
Progressive Conservative	31.28
New Democratic	30.15
Others	0.45

1974 Canadian federal election
Party	Candidate	Votes	%	±%
Liberal	Alan Gray Martin	13,702	36.6	+3.6
New Democratic	John Paul Harney	12,298	32.8	-3.6
Progressive Conservative	Basil Clark	11,339	30.2	-0.2
Marxist–Leninist	Linda Turnbull	89	0.2	+0.2
Independent	Harold Rowbottom	61	0.2	+0.2
Total valid votes		37,489	100.00	

1972 Canadian federal election
Party	Candidate	Votes	%	±%
New Democratic	John Paul Harney	15,028	36.4	+0.5
Liberal	David Weatherhead	13,635	33.0	-9.9
Progressive Conservative	Basil Clark	12,539	30.4	+9.2
Independent	Roger Tentrey	103	0.2	+0.2
Total valid votes		41,305	100.00	

1968 Canadian federal election
Party	Candidate	Votes	%	±%
Liberal	David Weatherhead	14,889	42.9	
New Democratic	John Paul Harney	12,473	35.9	
Progressive Conservative	Herb Crosby	7,340	21.2	
Total valid votes		34,702	100.00	

== See also ==
- List of Canadian electoral districts
- Historical federal electoral districts of Canada
