= Automotive Supplier Innovation Program =

Automotive Supplier Innovation Program (ASIP)
- Headquarters: Canada

Canada's Automotive Supplier Innovation Program (ASIP) supports initiatives of companies that innovate in the automotive sector. By giving an Automotive Innovation Fund it strengthens Canada's parts supply base and creates a favorable environment for automotive research and development while providing small and mid-sized companies the opportunity to enter global supply chains.

The program helps research and development projects to become commercially viable by supporting product development and product demonstration while sharing cost basis with participating companies. In 2017, the program awarded $11.5 million to six manufacturers.
