= 2017 Canadian federal budget =

2017 Budget of the Canadian Federal Government
- Presented: 22 March 2017
- Country: Canada
- Parliament: 42nd
- Party: Liberal
- Finance minister: Bill Morneau
- Total revenue: 304.7 billion (Projected); 313.6 billion (Actual)
- Total expenditures: 330.2 billion (Projected); 332.6 billion (Actual)
- Deficit: 28.5 billion (Projected); 19.0 billion (Actual)
- Website: http://www.budget.gc.ca/2017/docs/plan/budget-2017-en.pdf

The Canadian federal budget for fiscal year 2017–18 was presented to the Canadian House of Commons by Finance Minister Bill Morneau on March 22, 2017. The deficit was initially projected to be $28.5 billion, including a $3 billion adjustment for risk. This was later adjusted to $19.0 billion after reflecting a change in the discount rate methodology used to determine the present value of the Government's unfunded pension obligations. The Auditor General's recommendations resulted in revisions to 10 years' worth of budget numbers, which included turning the slim surplus the previous Conservative government left in 2014-15 into a small deficit.

== Expenditures ==
$8.48 billion in defence spending is re-allocated for use after 2036 to purchase fixed-wing search and rescue aircraft and light-armoured vehicles.

An additional $1.8 billion over six years is allocated into provincial and territorial skills training programs and an additional $900 million into workforce development agreements. Grants for part time students will be increased by fifty percent, and an additional $59.8 million over four years is proposed to expand eligibility for student grants.

The budget included the Strategic Innovation Fund, a novel programme which was slated to run for five years and provide $1.26 billion over its life.

$40 million is allocated for the creation of a database which would provide information on property purchases and sales, foreign ownership and demographic information; and an additional $11.2 billion is proposed over eleven years for affordable housing. An additional $300 million and $225 million for housing in the north and off-reserve indigenous housing, respectively, is proposed over eleven years.

An additional $828.2 million to expand health resources on reserves is proposed over five years.

$187.3 million is proposed over six years, which would provide a $1,000 benefit per month to veterans' caregivers and $133.9 million over six years is proposed to create a tax benefit to support veterans' education.

== Taxes ==
Excise duties on alcohol were increased by 2%, Uber became subject to the same taxes as taxis; and tax benefits for public transit users, the tourism sector and employers who create childcare spaces were eliminated.

A review of tax strategies used by small corporations and future increases to business fees based on inflation are planned.
