= Scarborough East (federal electoral district) =

Former federal electoral district in Ontario, Canada

Ontario electoral district
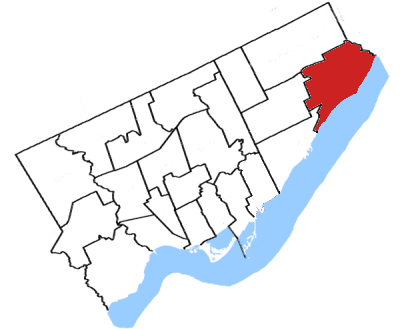
- Scarborough East, from 1996 to 2004

Defunct federal electoral district
- Legislature: House of Commons
- District created: 1966
- District abolished: 2003
- First contested: 1968
- Last contested: 2000

Scarborough East was a Canadian electoral district represented in the House of Commons of Canada from 1968 to 2003.

It initially consisted the eastern part of the Borough of Scarborough, although its boundaries were adjusted several times. It was created in 1966 from part of York—Scarborough. The federal electoral district was abolished in 2003 when it was redistributed between Pickering—Scarborough East and Scarborough-Guildwood ridings.

== Members of Parliament ==
Parliament	Years	Member	Party
Riding created from York—Scarborough
28th	1968–1972	Martin O'Connell	Liberal
29th	1972–1974	Reginald Stackhouse	Progressive Conservative
30th	1974–1979	Martin O'Connell	Liberal
31st	1979–1980	Gordon Gilchrist	Progressive Conservative
32nd	1980–1984	Gordon Gilchrist	Progressive Conservative
33rd	1984–1988	Robert Hicks	Progressive Conservative
34th	1988–1993	Robert Hicks	Progressive Conservative
35th	1993–1997	Douglas Peters	Liberal
36th	1997–2000	John McKay	Liberal
37th	2000–2004	John McKay	Liberal
Riding dissolved into Pickering—Scarborough East and Scarborough-Guildwood

== Historic boundaries ==
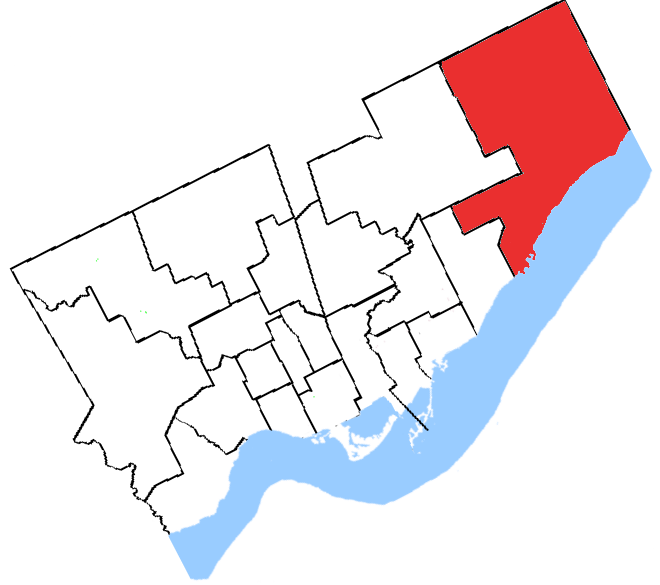
1966 to 1976

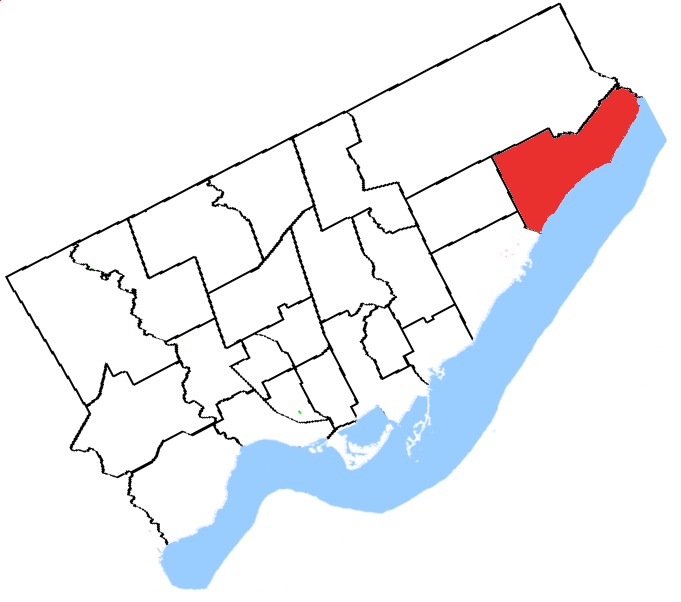
1976 to 1987

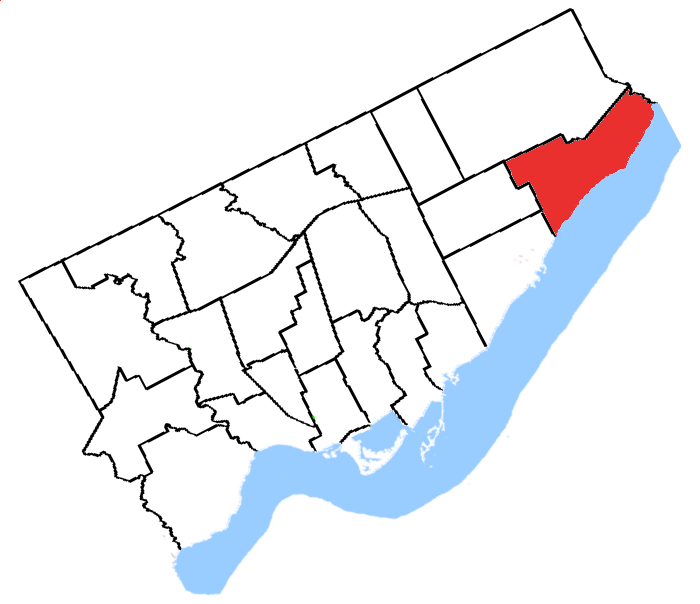
1987 to 1996

== Election results ==
1968 Canadian federal election
Party	Candidate	Votes
Liberal	Martin O'Connell	23,701
New Democratic	Kenneth Ranney	13,265
Progressive Conservative	James A. Taylor	12,477

1972 Canadian federal election
Party	Candidate	Votes
Progressive Conservative	Reg Stackhouse	27,301
Liberal	Martin O'Connell	25,837
New Democratic	John McMahon	14,731
Social Credit	George McLenon	227
Not affiliated	Don Macerollo	77

1974 Canadian federal election
Party	Candidate	Votes
Liberal	Martin O'Connell	30,586
Progressive Conservative	D. Crawford Smyth	23,585
New Democratic	John McMahon	10,772
Social Credit	George McLenon	173
Independent	Raymond M. Whidden	172
Marxist–Leninist	Sharon Stevenson	96

1979 Canadian federal election
Party	Candidate	Votes
Progressive Conservative	Gordon Gilchrist	21,381
Liberal	Martin O'Connell	16,002
New Democratic	Sid Dunkley	8,190
Libertarian	Paul Young	170
Marxist–Leninist	Thomas Boylan	62

1980 Canadian federal election
Party	Candidate	Votes
Progressive Conservative	Gordon Gilchrist	17,658
Liberal	Martin O'Connell	17,147
New Democratic	Chris Bain	8,533
Libertarian	Paul C. Young	181
Marxist–Leninist	Tom Boylan	60

1984 Canadian federal election
Party	Candidate	Votes
Progressive Conservative	Bob Hicks	26,349
Liberal	Betty Fevreau	13,325
New Democratic	Alawi Mohideen	6,422
Green	Lois Jean James	553
Libertarian	Jim Mcintosh	512
Communist	Norman Brudy	142
Commonwealth of Canada	James Browne	87

1988 Canadian federal election
Party	Candidate	Votes
Progressive Conservative	Bob Hicks	18,149
Liberal	Betty Fevreau	16,337
New Democratic	Mary Cook	6,866
Libertarian	Jim Mcintosh	307
Green	Greg Knittl	201
Communist	Kathy Koulas	69

1993 Canadian federal election
Party	Candidate	Votes
Liberal	Doug Peters	20,048
Reform	Randall Flint	10,239
Progressive Conservative	D'arcy Keene	6,598
New Democratic	Doug Ottenbreit	1,524
National	David Glover	379
Libertarian	Jim Mcintosh	363
Green	Lois Jean James	250
Natural Law	Carol-Anne Coulter	195
Abolitionist	James Norton Worthington	59

1997 Canadian federal election
Party	Candidate	Votes
Liberal	John McKay	23,065
Progressive Conservative	D'arcy Keene	8,297
Reform	Calvin Henry-Cotnam	7,011
New Democratic	Bob Frankford	3,330
Green	Sharon Trivers	278
Christian Heritage	Ian Town	171
Canadian Action	Stan Roberts	164
Natural Law	Erica Kindl	135

2000 Canadian federal election: Scarborough East
Party	Candidate	Votes	%	Expenditures
Liberal	John McKay	24,019	59.82	$37,639
Alliance	Paul Calandra	7,559	18.83	$32,135
Progressive Conservative	Paul McCrossan	6,284	15.65	$26,016
New Democratic	Denise Lake	1,884	4.69	$4,973
Canadian Action	Dave Glover	292	0.73	none listed
Marxist–Leninist	France Tremblay	113	0.28	$8
Total valid votes		40,151	100.00	
Total rejected ballots		155		
Turnout		40,306	55.91	
Electors on the lists		72,092		
Sources: Official Results, Elections Canada and Financial Returns, Elections Canada.

== See also ==
- List of Canadian electoral districts
- Historical federal electoral districts of Canada
