= InterAction Council of Former Heads of State and Government =

International non-profit organization

The InterAction Council is an independent non-profit organization that brings together former world leaders to mobilize their energy, experience and international contacts in an effort to develop recommendations and foster co-operation and positive action around the world.

Founded in 1983, this body meets on annually and is composed of 40 former world leaders. The organization and its members jointly develop recommendations on, and practical solutions for, the political, economic and social problems confronting humanity. These efforts are focused on three main priority areas: peace and security, world economic revitalization and universal ethical standards.

One of its most well-known initiatives was the development of a draft Universal Declaration of Human Responsibilities, which was an attempt to propose a set of responsibilities that were shared by all individuals to counterbalance the United Nations Universal Declaration of Human Rights. This new "global ethic" would provide a foundation of freedom, justice and peace in order for universal rights to be meaningful. These agreed values and standards complement universal rights, as the maximization of personal freedom at the expense of others, without consideration of others, is as problematic as having no rights at all.

== Members ==
- Franz Vranitzky, Honorary Co-chair and Chancellor of Austria (1986–1997)
- Jean Chrétien, Honorary Co-chair and Prime Minister of Canada (1993–2003)
- Olusegun Obasanjo, President of Nigeria (1976–79, 1999–2007)
- Bertie Ahern, Taoiseach of Ireland (1997–2008)
- Gro Harlem Brundtland, Prime Minister of Norway (1981, 1986–1989, 1990–1996)
- Vigdís Finnbogadóttir, President of Iceland (1980–1996)
- Bill Clinton, President of the United States (1993–2001)
- Goh Chok Tong, Prime Minister of Singapore (1990–2004)
- Vicente Fox, President of Mexico (2000–2006)
- Oscar Arias, President of Costa Rica (1986–1990, 2006–2010)
- Shaukat Aziz, Prime Minister of Pakistan (2004–2007)
- Tarja Halonen, President of Finland (2000–2012)
- Alain Juppé, Prime Minister of France (1995–1997)
- Seyed Mohammad Khātamī, President of Iran (1997–2005)
- Václav Klaus, President of the Czech Republic (2003–2013)
- Leonid Kuchma, President of Ukraine (1994–2005)
- John Major, Prime Minister of the United Kingdom (1990–1997)
- Péter Medgyessy, Prime Minister of Hungary (2002–2004)
- Andrés Pastrana, President of Colombia (1998–2002)
- Percival Noel James Patterson, Prime Minister of Jamaica (1992–2006)
- Romano Prodi, Prime Minister of the Republic of Italy (1996–1998, 2006–2008)
- Abdulaziz Al-Quraishi, Former Governor of the Saudi Arabian Monetary Authority (1974 - 1984)
- José Sarney, President of Brazil (1985–1990)
- Gerhard Schröder, Chancellor of Germany (1998–2005)
- Danilo Türk, President of Slovenia (2007–2012)
- Tung Chee Hwa, Chief Executive of Hong Kong Administration (1997–2005)
- Vaira Vīķe-Freiberga, President of Latvia (1999–2007)
- Susilo Bambang Yudhoyono, President of Indonesia (2004–2014)
- Viktor Yushchenko, President of Ukraine (2005–2010)
- Ernesto Zedillo Ponce de Léon, President of Mexico (1994–1999)
- Viktor Zubkov, Prime Minister of Russia (2007–2008)

== Post-mortem Members ==
- Takeo Fukuda 1905–1995, Founder and Prime Minister of Japan (1976–1978)
- Kiichi Miyazawa 1919–2007, Co-chairman and Prime Minister of Japan (1991–1993)
- Helmut Schmidt 1918–2015, Honorary Chairman and Chancellor of West Germany (1974–1982)
- Malcolm Fraser, 1930–2015, Honorary Chairman and Prime Minister of Australia (1975–1983)
- Abdullah bin Haji Ahmad Badawi, Prime Minister of Malaysia (2003–2009)
- James Bolger, Prime Minister of New Zealand (1990–1997)
- Lord Callaghan of Cardiff 1912–2005, Prime Minister of the United Kingdom (1976–1979)
- Jean-Luc Dehaene, 1940–2014, Prime Minister of Belgium (1992–1999)
- Fernando de la Rúa, President of Argentina (1999–2001)
- Maria de Lourdes Pintasilgo 1930–2004, Prime Minister of Portugal (1979–1980)
- Lee Hong-koo, Prime Minister of the Republic of Korea (1994–1995)
- Lee Kuan Yew, 1923–2015, Prime Minister of Singapore (1959–1990)
- Shin Hyun-hwak 1920–2007, Prime Minister of the Republic of Korea (1979–1980)
- Abdul Salam Majali, Prime Minister of Jordan (1993–1995, 1997–1998)
- Nelson Mandela 1918–2013, President of South Africa (1994–1999)
- James Fitz-Allen Mitchell, Prime Minister of Saint Vincent and the Grenadines (1972–1974, 1984–2000)
- Benjamin William Mkapa, President of Tanzania (1995–2005)
- Misael Pastrana Borrero 1923–1997, President of the Republic of Colombia (1970–1974)
- Yevgeny M. Primakov 1929–2015, Prime Minister of the Russian Federation (1998–1999)
- Jerry John Rawlings, Head of State of Ghana (1986–2000)
- Konstantinos G. Simitis, Prime Minister of Greece (1996–2004)
- Kalevi Sorsa 1930–2004, Prime Minister of the Republic of Finland (1972–1975, 1977–1979, 1982–1987)
- Pierre Elliott Trudeau 1919–2000, Prime Minister of Canada (1968–1979, 1980–1984)
- George Vassiliou, President of Cyprus (1988–1993)
- Richard von Weizsäcker 1920–2015, President of the Federal Republic of Germany (1984–1994)
- Kriangsak Chomanan, 1917–2003, Prime Minister of Thailand (1977–1980)

== Books ==
The InterAction Council released its first book in 2008 through the McGill-Queen's University Press in Canada, entitled Bridging the Divide: Religious Dialogue and Universal Ethics.

A second book, produced with the Walter and Duncan Gordon Foundation of Canada and the United Nations University Institute for Water, Environment and Health, was released in the fall of 2012, entitled: The Global Water Crisis: Addressing an Urgent Security Issue.

In 2014, the InterAction Council again partnered with the United Nations University Institute for Water, Environment and Health on the release of Global Agenda 2013: Water, Energy, and the Arab Awakening. Also in 2014, the Council published a book from its Interfaith Dialogue in Vienna, Austria in March of that year, entitled, Ethics in Decision-Making.
