= Campaign Life Coalition =

Canadian political lobbyist organization

- Formation: 1978; 48 years ago
- Headquarters: Hamilton, Ontario, Canada
- President: Jeff Gunnarson
- Website: campaignlifecoalition.com

The Campaign Life Coalition (sometimes shortened to Campaign Life) is a Canadian political lobbyist organization founded in 1978. Based in Hamilton, Ontario, the organization advocates for socially conservative values. Campaign Life Coalition opposes abortion, euthanasia, embryonic stem cell research, in vitro fertilization, same-sex marriage, and transgender rights legislation.

== Ontario politics ==
At the provincial level in Ontario, Campaign Life helped to establish and initially supported the Family Coalition Party (FCP). Following the FCP's name change to the New Reform Party of Ontario and the election of Patrick Brown as the new leader of the Progressive Conservative Party of Ontario in 2015, the CLC appeared to switch support to the Ontario PCs. The CLC endorsed Brown's bid for the leadership, along with the other social conservative leadership candidate Monte McNaughton, and released a statement congratulating Brown on his victory. The group later became critical of Brown after he publicly announced that he would not repeal the new provincial sex education curriculum changes if he became premier.

== Federal politics ==
Campaign Life endorsed candidates Brad Trost and Pierre Lemieux in the 2017 Conservative leadership election. Trost came 4th with 8.35%, and Lemieux came 7th with 7.38%.

Campaign Life endorsed Leslyn Lewis in the 2022 Conservative leadership election. Lewis came 3rd with 9.69%.

== LifeSiteNews ==
Campaign Life Coalition founded LifeSiteNews in 1997, with the intent to promote anti-abortion views. The Campaign Life Coalition no longer runs LifeSiteNews, though the two groups share some board members.
