= Leslie Church =

Canadian politician

Leslie Church MP
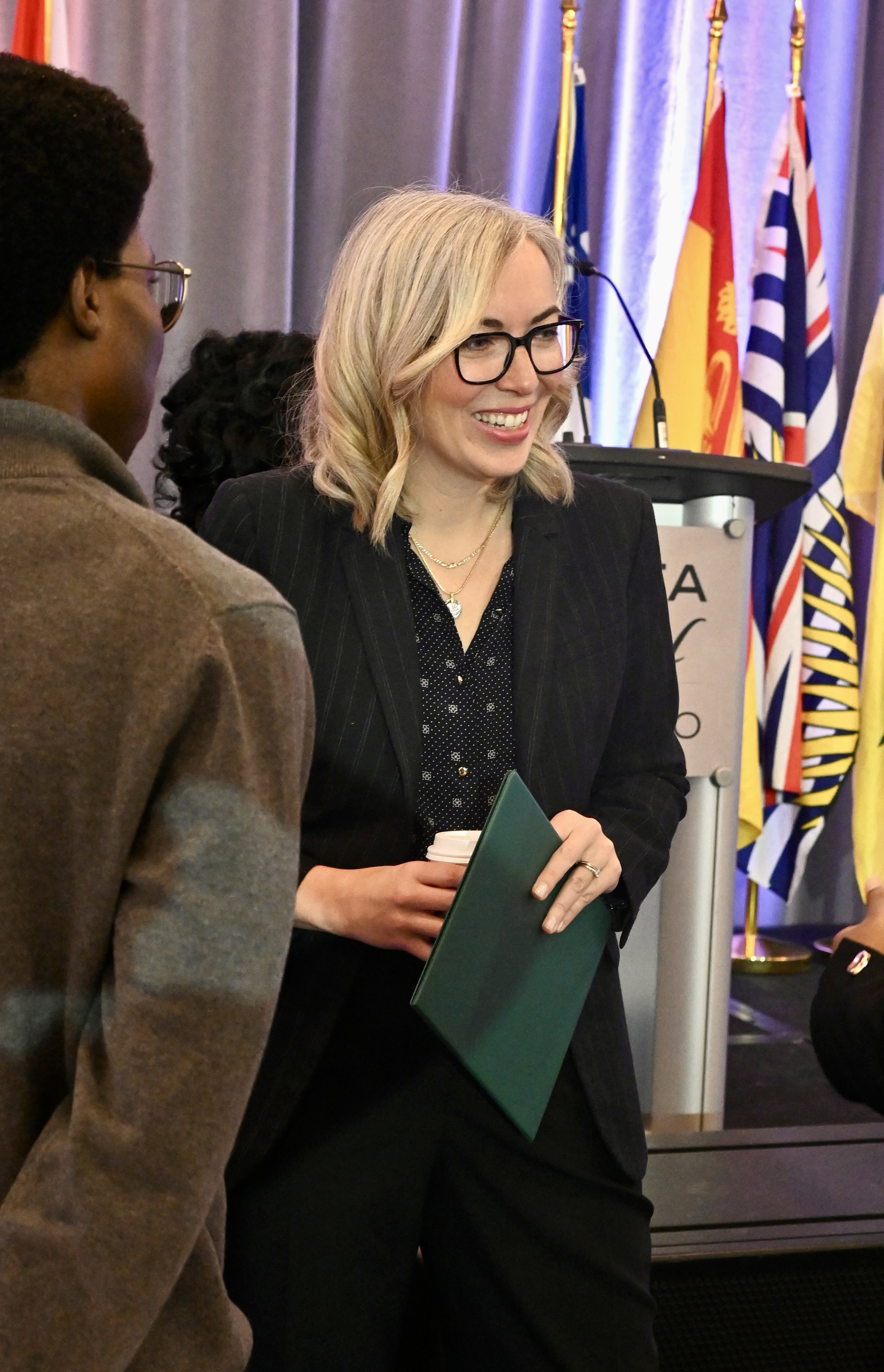
- Church in 2026

Parliamentary Secretary to the Minister of Jobs and Families
- Incumbent
- Assumed office June 5, 2025 Serving with Annie Koutrakis
- Minister: Patty Hajdu

Parliamentary Secretary to the Secretaries of State for Labour, Seniors, and Children and Youth
- Incumbent
- Assumed office June 5, 2025

Member of Parliament for Toronto—St. Paul's
- Incumbent
- Assumed office April 28, 2025
- Preceded by: Don Stewart

Personal details
- Party: Liberal
- Website: lesliechurch.ca

Leslie Church MP is a Canadian politician and lawyer who has served as the Member of Parliament for Toronto–St. Paul's since the 2025 Canadian federal election. She is known for her extensive career in the public and private sectors, having held senior roles in federal government, public affairs and the technology sector.

== Early life and education ==
Church grew up in Edmonton, Alberta. She holds a Bachelor of Arts (Honours) in Political Science & International Relations from the University of Alberta where she served on the Board of Governors and as President of the Student's Union. She later earned a Master of Science in Politics of the World Economy from the London School of Economics and Political Science. She received her Juris Doctor from the University of Toronto Faculty of Law and was a Junior Fellow at Massey College.

After serving as the Executive Director of the Ontario Undergraduate Student Alliance, Church was a member of the Government of Ontario's advisory panel for the 2004 Rae Report, alongside former premiers Bob Rae and Bill Davis, as well as economist Don Drummond.

== Career ==
Church began her career practicing civil and commercial litigation at Torys LLP.

In 2012, she joined Google as the Head of Communications and Public Affairs across the company’s four Canadian offices in Toronto, Kitchener-Waterloo, Montreal and Ottawa.

While working at Google, Church was named Vice-Chair of the Ontario government’s Open Government Engagement Team alongside Progressive Conservative MPP Norm Sterling, digital expert and academic David Eaves, and author Peter MacLeod. In March 2014, they authored the Open By Default report advising that “open by default” principles should be a critical component of Ontario’s open government policy. While at Google, Church was also appointed to the Board of Directors for the Higher Education Quality Council of Ontario.

In 2015, it was announced that Church would be leaving Google to take on the role of Chief of Staff to then Heritage Minister Melanie Joly in the newly formed Trudeau government. In that role, she helped begin a significant modernization of Canadian cultural policies to support Canadian arts, culture, film and broadcasting, including Canada’s first creative export strategy and support for Indigenous languages. Following her tenure in Joly's office, Church briefly served as Chief of Staff to Minister of Women and Gender Equality, Maryam Monsef, and then to Public Services and Procurement Minister Anita Anand at the outset of the COVID-19 pandemic.

In 2020, Church joined the Office of the Minister of Finance and Deputy Prime Minister of Canada, the Honourable Chrystia Freeland, first as Director of Policy and, subsequently, as Chief of Staff. During this time, Church played a key role in the Government of Canada’s pandemic recovery, overseeing 3 federal budgets and working on key files like the introduction of national child care and dental care programs, Canada’s response to the Russian invasion of Ukraine, and economic collaboration with the Biden administration. In 2022, Church was placed on a list of 61 Canadian premiers, journalists and senior government advisors who were banned from entering Russia by the Russian Foreign Ministry. In 2023, she was credited by Politico with developing the Canada-U.S. Energy Transformation Task Force, to advance cooperation between Canada and the United States on clean energy initiatives and supply chains.

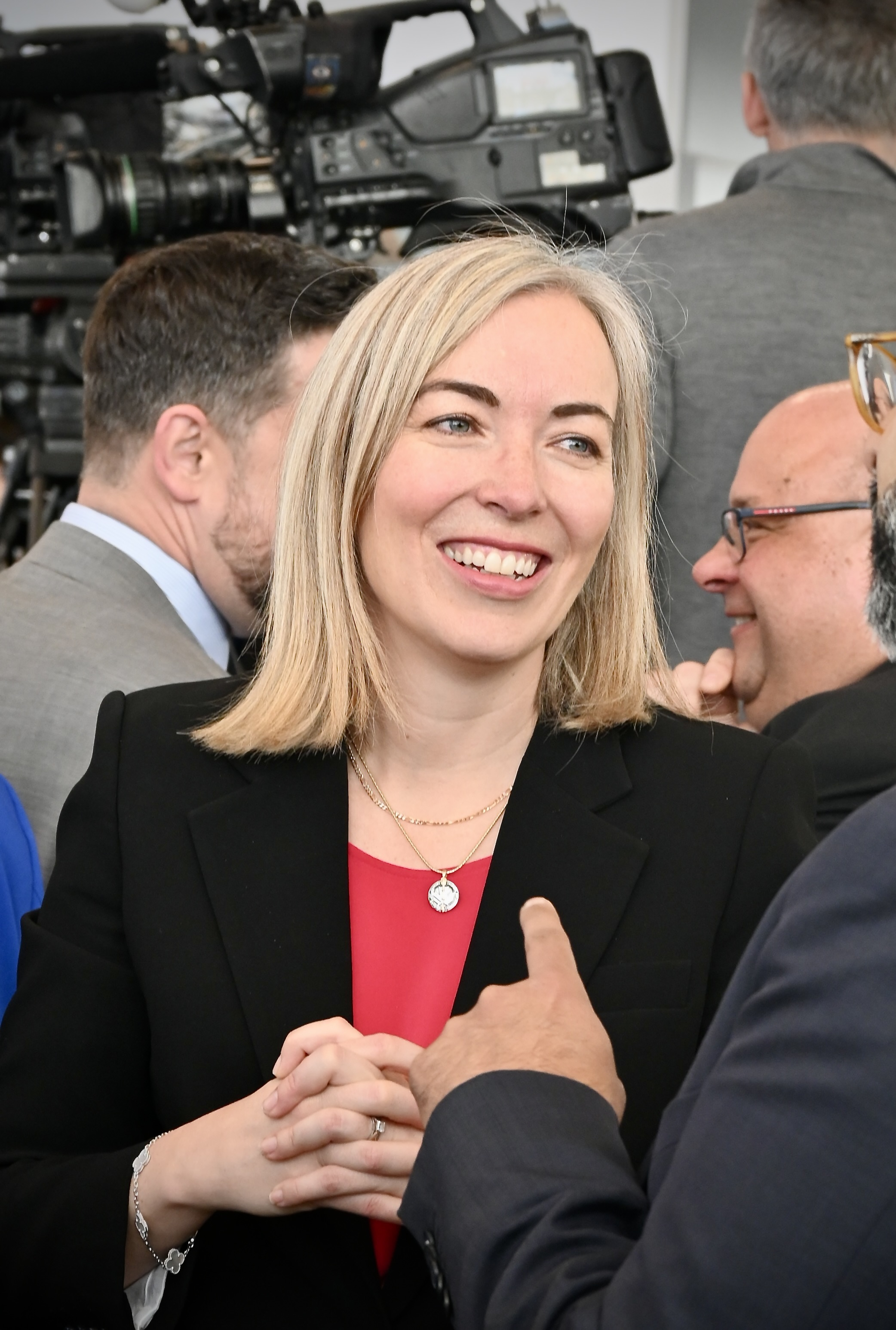
Leslie Church attending a press conference in Toronto in 2026.

Church held senior roles in past federal elections, as Deputy Director of Communications for the federal Liberal campaign during the 2019 Canadian federal election and as Director of Policy with responsibility for the Liberal Party platform for the 2021 Canadian federal election.

Church ran in the 2024 Toronto—St. Paul's federal by-election, and lost to Conservative candidate Don Stewart. She ran again in the 2025 Canadian federal election, and defeated Stewart, winning with 61.88% of the vote. Following her victory, Church made comparisons between her two campaigns as "night and day," after the resignation of Justin Trudeau.

On June 5, 2025, she was appointed Parliamentary Secretary to the Secretaries of State for Labour, for Seniors, and for Children and Youth, and Parliamentary Secretary to the Minister of Jobs and Families (Persons with Disabilities) by Prime Minister Mark Carney.

== Personal life ==
Church resides in Toronto, Ontario alongside her husband and three children.

== Electoral record ==
2025 Canadian federal election: Toronto—St. Paul's
Party	Candidate	Votes	%	±%	Expenditures
Liberal	Leslie Church	44,313	61.88	+12.37	$110,688.39
Conservative	Don Stewart	23,708	33.11	+6.60	$126,234.47
New Democratic	Bruce Levy	2,506	3.50	−12.39	16,112.01
Green	Shane Philips	552	0.77	−4.79	none listed
People's	Joseph Frasca	329	0.46	−2.04	none listed
Marxist–Leninist	David Gershuny	147	0.21	N/A	none listed
Canadian Future	Cynthia Valdron	58	0.08	N/A	none listed
Total valid votes/expense limit					
Total rejected ballots					
Turnout		71,613	74.05		
Eligible voters		96,713			
Liberal notional hold		Swing		+2.89	
Note: The changes in percentage value and swing were calculated using the redistributed results of the 2021 general election, not the 2024 by-election. The seat of Toronto—St. Paul's was won by the Liberals in 2021, but the seat was held by the Conservatives since 2024 following the by-election.
Source: Elections Canada

Canadian federal by-election, June 24, 2024: Toronto—St. Paul's Resignation of Carolyn Bennett
Party	Candidate	Votes	%	±%
Conservative	Don Stewart	15,565	42.11	+16.81
Liberal	Leslie Church	14,932	40.40	-8.82
New Democratic	Amrit Parhar	4,073	11.02	-5.81
Green	Christian Cullis	1,057	2.86	-3.13
People's	Dennis Wilson	238	0.64	-2.02
Independent	Jonathan Schachter	97	0.26	
Independent	Mário Stocco	82	0.22	
Marxist–Leninist	Meñico Turcotte	59	0.16	
Rhinoceros	Sean Carson	51	0.14	
Independent	Thibaud Mony	51	0.14	
Independent	Glen MacDonald	42	0.11	
Independent	Mélodie Anderson	39	0.11	
Independent	Demetrios Karavas	37	0.10	
No Affiliation	Stephen Davis	36	0.10	
Independent	Jordan Wong	31	0.08	
Marijuana	Danny Légaré	30	0.08	
Independent	Alex Banks	27	0.07	
Centrist	Ali Mohiuddin	26	0.07	
Independent	Jaël Champagne Gareau	23	0.06	
Independent	Michael Bednarski	18	0.05	
Independent	John Dale	18	0.05	
Independent	Pierre Larochelle	17	0.05	
Independent	Joshua Bram Hieu Pham	17	0.05	
Independent	Marie-Hélène LeBel	16	0.04	
Independent	Guillaume Paradis	16	0.04	
Independent	Daniel Andrew Graham	13	0.04	
Independent	Pierre Granger	13	0.04	
Independent	Julie St-Amand	13	0.04	
Independent	Loren Hicks	12	0.03	
Independent	Matéo Martin	12	0.03	
Independent	Blake Hamilton	11	0.03	
Independent	Line Bélanger	10	0.02	
Independent	Charles Currie	10	0.03	
Independent	Cory Deville	10	0.03	
Independent	Alexandra Engering	10	0.03	
Independent	Daniel Stuckless	10	0.03	
Independent	Erle Stanley Bowman	9	0.02	
Independent	Anthony Hamel	9	0.02	
Independent	Pascal St-Amand	9	0.02	
Independent	Sébastien CoRhino	8	0.02	
Independent	Mark Dejewski	8	0.02	
Independent	Daniel Gagnon	8	0.02	
Independent	Agnieszka Marszalek	8	0.02	
Independent	Olivier Renaud	8	0.02	
Independent	Patrick Strzalkowski	8	0.02	
Independent	Donald Gagnon	7	0.02	
Independent	Benjamin Teichman	7	0.02	
Independent	MarthaLee Aykroyd	6	0.02	
Independent	Myriam Beaulieu	6	0.02	
Independent	Kubera Desai	6	0.02	
Independent	Donovan Eckstrom	6	0.02	
Independent	Kevin Krisa	6	0.02	
Independent	Lorant Polya	6	0.02	
Independent	Roger Sherwood	6	0.02	
Independent	Elliot Wand	6	0.02	
Independent	Michal Wieczorek	6	0.02	
Independent	Maxime Boivin	5	0.01	
Independent	Martin Acetaria Caesar Jubinville	5	0.01	
Independent	Jean-Denis Parent Boudreault	4	0.01	
Independent	Léthycia-Félix Corriveau	4	0.01	
Independent	Ysack Dupont	4	0.01	
Independent	Dji-Pé Frazer	4	0.01	
Independent	Zornitsa Halacheva	4	0.01	
Independent	Alain Lamontagne	4	0.01	
Independent	Renée Lemieux	4	0.01	
Independent	Danimal Preston	4	0.01	
Independent	Spencer Rocchi	4	0.01	
Independent	Yogo Shimada	4	0.01	
Independent	Darcy Vanderwater	4	0.01	
Independent	Mylène Bonneau	3	0.01	
Independent	Guillaume Gagnier-Michel	3	0.01	
Independent	Kerri Hildebrandt	3	0.01	
Independent	Krzysztof Krzywinski	3	0.01	
Independent	Connie Lukawski	3	0.01	
Independent	Wallace Richard Rowat	3	0.01	
Independent	Gavin Vanderwater	3	0.01	
Independent	Alain Bourgault	2	0.01	
No Affiliation	Manon Marie Lili Desbiens	2	0.01	
Independent	Gerrit Dogger	2	0.01	
Independent	Samuel Ducharme	2	0.01	
Independent	Yusuf Kadir Nasihi	2	0.01	
Independent	Winston Neutel	2	0.01	
Independent	Jacques Saintonge	2	0.01	
Independent	Felix-Antoine Hamel	0	0.00	
Total valid votes		36,962		
Total rejected ballots				
Turnout			43.52	-21.96
Eligible voters		84,934		
Conservative gain from Liberal		Swing		+12.76
