= Barbara McDougall =

Canadian politician

The Honourable Barbara McDougall PC OC
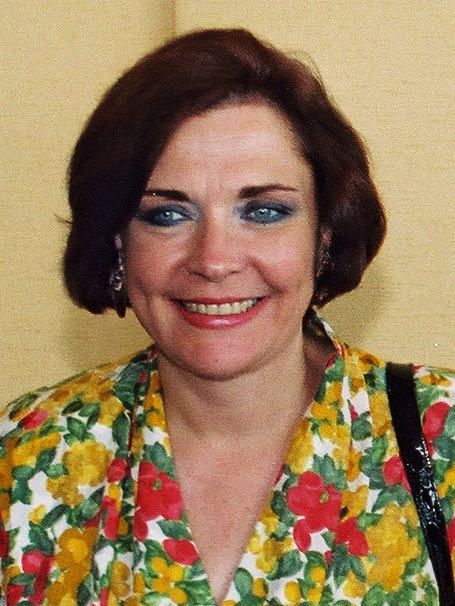
- McDougall in 1991

Secretary of State for External Affairs
- In office April 21, 1991 – June 24, 1993
- Prime Minister: Brian Mulroney
- Preceded by: Joe Clark
- Succeeded by: Perrin Beatty

Minister of Employment and Immigration
- In office March 31, 1988 – April 20, 1991
- Prime Minister: Brian Mulroney
- Preceded by: Benoît Bouchard
- Succeeded by: Bernard Valcourt

Minister responsible for the Status of Women
- In office June 30, 1986 – February 22, 1990
- Prime Minister: Brian Mulroney
- Preceded by: Walter McLean
- Succeeded by: Mary Collins

Member of Parliament for St. Paul's
- In office September 4, 1984 – October 24, 1993
- Preceded by: John Roberts
- Succeeded by: Barry Campbell

Personal details
- Born: November 12, 1937 (age 88) Toronto, Ontario, Canada
- Party: Progressive Conservative
- Profession: Consultant

Barbara Jean McDougall PC OC (born November 12, 1937) is a former Canadian politician. She served as a Member of Parliament from 1984 to 1993, and as Secretary of State for External Affairs from 1991 to 1993. She did not run again in the 1993 Canadian federal election which saw the incumbent Progressive Conservative government reduced to two seats in the House of Commons.

In 2000 she was made an Officer of the Order of Canada.

== Government and political experience ==
McDougall served as a member of parliament from St. Paul's (Toronto) for the Progressive Conservative Party of Canada from 1984 to 1993. At the Cabinet table she was a vocal proponent of free choice for women in the abortion debate. She based her opposition to Senate reform partly on the fact that this institution is responsible for the state of abortion law in Canada at present.

She held the following government posts:

Position	Term
Secretary of State for External Affairs	1991.04.21 - 1993.06.24
Minister of State (Youth) (Acting)	1990.01.24 - 1990.02.22
Minister of Employment and Immigration	1988.03.31 - 1991.04.20
Minister of State (Privatization)	1986.06.30 - 1988.03.30
Minister responsible for the Status of Women	1986.06.30 - 1990.02.22
Minister of State (Finance)	1984.09.17 - 1986.06.29

McDougall has remained active in conservative political circles. She was a member of the Red Tory Council and supported auto-parts magnate Belinda Stronach's campaign to become leader of the new Conservative Party of Canada in winter 2004.

On January 14, 2005, McDougall participated in the Atlantic Storm pandemic preparedness exercise at the Center for Biosecurity of UPMC, playing the fictional role of Prime Minister of Canada. On December 18, 2006, it was announced that she would be appointed as a panelist on the Internal Trade Implementation Act for a period of five years.

== Education ==
McDougall received a B.A. from the University of Toronto in political science and economics in 1963.

== Other careers ==
McDougall has previously been an advisor for Toronto law firm Aird & Berlis LLP where she counsels clients on matters of international business development, corporate governance and government relations.

She is the chair of Global Panel America and a member of the Global Panel Foundation's worldwide supervisory board based in Berlin, Prague and Sydney. She has served as a Canadian representative to the Inter-American Dialogue in Washington, D.C., and The International Crisis Group in Brussels, Belgium.

A Scotiabank director from 1999 to 2008, she sat on the Audit and Conduct Review Committee and the Human Resources Committee. She had previously served as Chair of the Conduct Review/Pension Committee.

McDougall was on the board of Stelco Inc. and the Independent Order of Foresters. She is a director of Unique Solutions Design Ltd.

She has worked as a business reporter for the Vancouver Sun, an analyst for Odlum Brown and at brokerage firm A.E. Ames, where she became the company's first female vice president.

From October 2004 to March 2010 McDougall served on the Board of Directors of Imperial Tobacco Canada, the Canadian subsidiary of British American Tobacco. In that capacity she chaired the Corporate Social Responsibility Committee of Imperial Tobacco Canada.

=== Controversial position at IDRC ===
In December 2007 McDougall was appointed chair of the board of Canada's International Development Research Centre (IDRC). Liberal MP Carolyn Bennett criticized her appointment as Chair of IDRC because of the conflict of interest it created between her role as director of a tobacco company and chair of an agency funding tobacco control efforts. The press release announcing her appointment did not mention her ongoing directorship of Imperial Tobacco. It is also omitted from her bio on the IDRC website. As a result of this serious conflict of interest, a major tobacco control coordination meeting in Africa funded by IDRC was boycotted by its participants and the Gates Foundation pulled US$5 million of tobacco control funding from IDRC in April 2010.

== Archives ==
There is a Barbara McDougall fonds at Library and Archives Canada.
