= 2024 Toronto—St. Paul's federal by-election =

Federal by-election in Ontario, Canada

- June 24, 2024

Riding of Toronto—St. Paul's
- Turnout: 43.52%
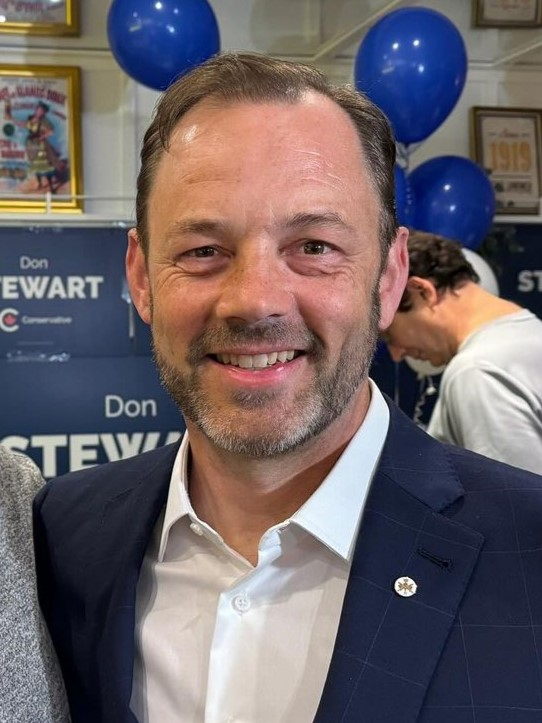
	First party	Second party	Third party
		LPC	NDP
Candidate	Don Stewart	Leslie Church	Amrit Parhar
Party	Conservative	Liberal	New Democratic
Popular vote	15,565	14,932	4,073
Percentage	42.11%	40.40%	11.02%
Swing	▲16.81 pp	▼8.82 pp	▼5.81 pp
- Historical Results in Toronto-St. Paul's and St. Paul's
MP before election
Carolyn Bennett
Liberal
Elected MP
Don Stewart
Conservative

A by-election was held in the federal riding of Toronto—St. Paul's in Ontario, Canada on June 24, 2024, following the resignation of incumbent Liberal MP Carolyn Bennett.

The race was considered by some as a referendum on the premiership of Prime Minister Justin Trudeau. The election was won by Conservative Party candidate Don Stewart, making him the first Conservative MP since 1993 to represent the riding. The byelection had notably higher turnout than other contests to the 44th Canadian Parliament and garnered national attention; a poll from Abacus Data in mid-July suggested that 63% of Canadians nationwide were aware of the outcome of this byelection, along with 70% of Liberal supporters. This resulted in a decline of confidence in Justin Trudeau among some Liberal caucus members and party supporters.

== Background ==
The riding of Toronto—St. Paul's was vacated on January 16, 2024, following the resignation of Liberal MP Carolyn Bennett. Bennett, most recently the Minister of Mental Health and Addictions and Associate Minister of Health in the government of Justin Trudeau, had held the seat since 1997. The race was considered by some as a "referendum" on the premiership of Trudeau.

=== Constituency ===
Prior to the by-election, Toronto—St. Paul's was considered a safe Liberal seat in Midtown, Toronto. It had been held by the Liberals since the 1993 federal election. The Government of Canada announced measures to protect the by-election from foreign interference.

=== Candidates ===
The Conservative Party nominated Don Stewart on January 24. He works for the Canadian Investment Regulatory Organization. Stewart campaigned on the main tenets of the Conservative Party platform under Pierre Poilievre, including crime and support for Israel.

Running for the Liberal nomination was Leslie Church, former chief of staff to Chrystia Freeland. She later received formal approval to run for Liberal nomination in Toronto—St. Paul's in April 2024. She ran against Emma Richardson, a senior advisor with Global Affairs Canada's United Nations division. The Liberal nomination was held on May 1 with Church winning the nomination. In 2020, Church agreed to an ethics screen for being married to lobbyist "Sheamus Murphy..(who is) registered to lobby the Liberal government in relation to several major sectors with active policy files, including broadcasting, energy and pharmaceutical companies that are working on a COVID-19 vaccine." She would later be elected as the MP for this riding in the 2025 Canadian federal election, defeating Stewart in a rematch.

Other prospective candidates for the Liberal nomination who declined to run, included former Toronto city councillor Josh Colle; former Ontario MPP Eric Hoskins, who represented the area provincially from 2009 to 2018 and previously served in the provincial cabinets of Dalton McGuinty and Kathleen Wynne, including as Minister of Health and Long-Term Care from 2014 to 2018; and Toronto city councillor Josh Matlow, who has represented the area municipally since 2010; Matlow ultimately decided not to run. With his riding set to merge with Scarborough Centre at the next election, Don Valley East MP Michael Coteau was seen as a potential candidate, in order to avoid a nomination battle with fellow Liberal MP Salma Zahid; Coteau ultimately declined to run.

The Rhinoceros Party announced that Sean Carson would be the candidate on January 13.

The NDP announced on April 17 that Amrit Parhar would be the candidate. She works as the Director of Programs at the Institute for Change Leaders, an organization that was founded by Toronto mayor, Olivia Chow. It was previously reported two days earlier by The Hill Times that MPP for Toronto—St. Paul's, Jill Andrew was considering seeking the nomination.

On May 17, the Centrist Party announced Ali Mohiuddin as their candidate.

On May 24, the Green Party announced that Christian Cullis, a constituent assistant for Ward 11 city councillor Dianne Saxe, would be their candidate. Emma Richardson, who previously lost the Liberal nomination, also sought the Green Party nomination.

On May 28, the People's Party announced that Dennis Wilson would be their candidate.

The Longest Ballot Committee, a political movement focused on electoral reform in opposition to first-past-the-post-voting, and supporting proportional representation, targeted this by-election. This yielded a record 84 candidates, breaking the previous record of 48 set in the Winnipeg South Centre by-election of June 19, 2023, before itself being broken by 7 names during the 2024 LaSalle—Émard—Verdun federal by-election, also attributed to the LBC. The current record is held by the 214 names on the ballot of the 2025 Battle River—Crowfoot federal by-election, with 201 of them being from the LBC. The resulting ballot papers were 90 centimetres (35 in) long, requiring temporary changes to the Elections Act due to their unprecedented size. One candidate, Félix-Antoine Hamel, did not receive any votes, and is believed to be the first candidate to receive zero votes in a federal election in Canadian history. He could not vote for himself, as he did not live in the riding.

== Opinion polls ==
No public opinion polls were released before election day. The day after the election, Mainstreet Research released a poll they conducted during the writ period. They did not release the poll during the writ period due to a lack of confidence in the sample.

Evolution of voting intentions at riding level
Polling firm	Last day of survey	Source	CPC	LPC	NDP	GPC	PPC	Other	Undecided	ME	Sample
By-election 2024	June 24, 2024		42.11	40.40	11.02	2.86	0.64	2.97	—	—	36,962
Mainstreet	June 2024		41	39	11	4	2	2	11	—N/a	256
Election 2021	September 20, 2021		25.30	49.22	16.83	5.99	2.67	—	—	—	53,698

== Results ==
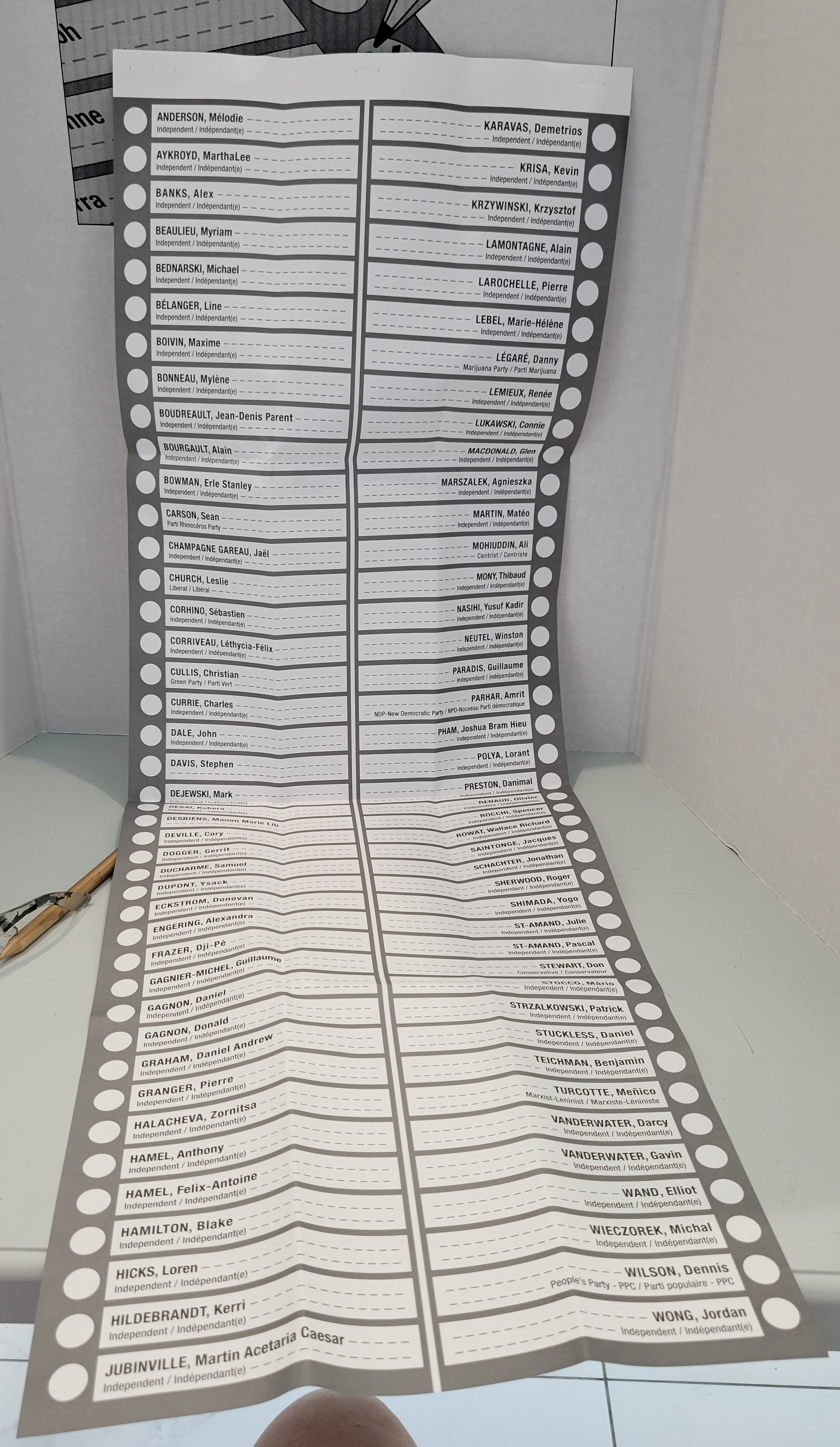
Ballot paper for the by-election

Canadian federal by-election, June 24, 2024: Toronto—St. Paul's Resignation of Carolyn Bennett
Party	Candidate	Votes	%	±%
Conservative	Don Stewart	15,565	42.11	+16.81
Liberal	Leslie Church	14,932	40.40	-8.82
New Democratic	Amrit Parhar	4,073	11.02	-5.81
Green	Christian Cullis	1,057	2.86	-3.13
People's	Dennis Wilson	238	0.64	-2.02
Independent	Jonathan Schachter	97	0.26	
Independent	Mário Stocco	82	0.22	
Marxist–Leninist	Meñico Turcotte	59	0.16	
Rhinoceros	Sean Carson	51	0.14	
Independent	Thibaud Mony	51	0.14	
Independent	Glen MacDonald	42	0.11	
Independent	Mélodie Anderson	39	0.11	
Independent	Demetrios Karavas	37	0.10	
No Affiliation	Stephen Davis	36	0.10	
Independent	Jordan Wong	31	0.08	
Marijuana	Danny Légaré	30	0.08	
Independent	Alex Banks	27	0.07	
Centrist	Ali Mohiuddin	26	0.07	
Independent	Jaël Champagne Gareau	23	0.06	
Independent	Michael Bednarski	18	0.05	
Independent	John Dale	18	0.05	
Independent	Pierre Larochelle	17	0.05	
Independent	Joshua Bram Hieu Pham	17	0.05	
Independent	Marie-Hélène LeBel	16	0.04	
Independent	Guillaume Paradis	16	0.04	
Independent	Daniel Andrew Graham	13	0.04	
Independent	Pierre Granger	13	0.04	
Independent	Julie St-Amand	13	0.04	
Independent	Loren Hicks	12	0.03	
Independent	Matéo Martin	12	0.03	
Independent	Blake Hamilton	11	0.03	
Independent	Line Bélanger	10	0.02	
Independent	Charles Currie	10	0.03	
Independent	Cory Deville	10	0.03	
Independent	Alexandra Engering	10	0.03	
Independent	Daniel Stuckless	10	0.03	
Independent	Erle Stanley Bowman	9	0.02	
Independent	Anthony Hamel	9	0.02	
Independent	Pascal St-Amand	9	0.02	
Independent	Sébastien CoRhino	8	0.02	
Independent	Mark Dejewski	8	0.02	
Independent	Daniel Gagnon	8	0.02	
Independent	Agnieszka Marszalek	8	0.02	
Independent	Olivier Renaud	8	0.02	
Independent	Patrick Strzalkowski	8	0.02	
Independent	Donald Gagnon	7	0.02	
Independent	Benjamin Teichman	7	0.02	
Independent	MarthaLee Aykroyd	6	0.02	
Independent	Myriam Beaulieu	6	0.02	
Independent	Kubera Desai	6	0.02	
Independent	Donovan Eckstrom	6	0.02	
Independent	Kevin Krisa	6	0.02	
Independent	Lorant Polya	6	0.02	
Independent	Roger Sherwood	6	0.02	
Independent	Elliot Wand	6	0.02	
Independent	Michal Wieczorek	6	0.02	
Independent	Maxime Boivin	5	0.01	
Independent	Martin Acetaria Caesar Jubinville	5	0.01	
Independent	Jean-Denis Parent Boudreault	4	0.01	
Independent	Léthycia-Félix Corriveau	4	0.01	
Independent	Ysack Dupont	4	0.01	
Independent	Dji-Pé Frazer	4	0.01	
Independent	Zornitsa Halacheva	4	0.01	
Independent	Alain Lamontagne	4	0.01	
Independent	Renée Lemieux	4	0.01	
Independent	Danimal Preston	4	0.01	
Independent	Spencer Rocchi	4	0.01	
Independent	Yogo Shimada	4	0.01	
Independent	Darcy Vanderwater	4	0.01	
Independent	Mylène Bonneau	3	0.01	
Independent	Guillaume Gagnier-Michel	3	0.01	
Independent	Kerri Hildebrandt	3	0.01	
Independent	Krzysztof Krzywinski	3	0.01	
Independent	Connie Lukawski	3	0.01	
Independent	Wallace Richard Rowat	3	0.01	
Independent	Gavin Vanderwater	3	0.01	
Independent	Alain Bourgault	2	0.01	
No Affiliation	Manon Marie Lili Desbiens	2	0.01	
Independent	Gerrit Dogger	2	0.01	
Independent	Samuel Ducharme	2	0.01	
Independent	Yusuf Kadir Nasihi	2	0.01	
Independent	Winston Neutel	2	0.01	
Independent	Jacques Saintonge	2	0.01	
Independent	Felix-Antoine Hamel	0	0.00	
Total valid votes		36,962		
Total rejected ballots				
Turnout			43.52	-21.96
Eligible voters		84,934		
Conservative gain from Liberal		Swing		+12.76

== 2021 result ==
2021 Canadian federal election: Toronto—St. Paul's
Party	Candidate	Votes	%	±%	Expenditures
Liberal	Carolyn Bennett	26,429	49.22	-5.09	$88,807.52
Conservative	Stephanie Osadchuk	13,587	25.30	+3.69	$26,751.24
New Democratic	Sidney Coles	9,036	16.83	+1.05	$31,250.09
Green	Phil De Luna	3,214	5.99	-0.77	$30,817.63
People's	Peter Remedios	1,432	2.67	+1.12	$1,412.77
Total valid votes/expense limit		53,698	98.93	–	$112,245.61
Total rejected ballots		580	1.07	+0.43	
Turnout		54,278	65.48	-4.91	
Eligible voters		82,891			
Liberal hold		Swing		-4.39	
Source: Elections Canada

== See also ==
- By-elections to the 44th Canadian Parliament
