= Toronto—St. Paul's (federal electoral district) =

Federal electoral district in Ontario, Canada

Coordinates: 43.696°N 79.4076°W

Ontario electoral district
- Interactive map of riding boundaries from the 2025 federal election

Federal electoral district
- Legislature: House of Commons
MP
Leslie Church
Liberal
- District created: 1933
- First contested: 1935
- Last contested: 2025
- District webpage: profile, map

Demographics
- Population (2021): 116,953
- Electors (2024): 84,934
- Area (km²): 14
- Pop. density (per km²): 8,353.8
- Census division: Toronto
- Census subdivision: Toronto (part)

Toronto—St. Paul's is a federal electoral district in Toronto, Ontario, Canada, that has been represented in the House of Commons of Canada since 1935. Before the 2015 election, the riding was known as St. Paul's.

The small but densely populated riding covers the area to the north and northwest of Downtown Toronto, often called Midtown Toronto. In the latter part of the 20th century, the riding was seen as a bellwether riding. From 1965 to 2006, the riding always voted for the party that would form the next government. The seat was also a Liberal stronghold for 30 years starting with the 1993 Liberal landslide, and it would continue to vote that way even in the 2011 election, when the party under Michael Ignatieff was reduced to 3rd place for the first time and won only 34 seats nationwide. The streak was broken in a by-election on June 24, 2024, when Conservative candidate Don Stewart won the seat after it was vacated by the resignation of Carolyn Bennett, though it was won back by the Liberals less than a year later in the April 2025 general election with a 28.8% margin ahead of the incumbent Conservative.

== Geography ==
As of 2012 Canadian federal electoral redistribution, the riding includes the southern two-thirds of the wealthy Toronto neighbourhood of Forest Hill, plus the neighbourhoods of Deer Park, Davisville Village, Chaplin Estates, South Hill, Humewood-Cedarvale, the southern two-thirds of Fairbank, and the northern half of Summerhill.

In the last couple of federal elections, the Liberals have been strong throughout the riding, but were particularly strong in middle-class areas such as Fairbank and in Rosehill (a sub neighbourhood of Deer Park). They were also especially strong in Davisville Village in 2019, but this support has dropped. Their weakest neighbourhood in both elections was the more upper-class Forest Hill, which is the strongest neighbourhood for the Conservatives. For the NDP, their strongest neighbourhoods have been Davenport, Tarragon Village and Humewood.

Following the 2022 Canadian federal electoral redistribution, the riding will gain the remainder of Davisville Village from Don Valley West, the area north of the CPR (Moore Park area) in University—Rosedale, and lose the area south of Vaughan Road and west of Winona Drive (in Oakwood Village) to the riding of Davenport. The changes came into effect for the 2025 Canadian federal election.

== Demographics ==
According to the 2021 Canadian census

Ethnic groups: 63.9% White, 6.3% South Asian, 6.0% Black, 5.0% Chinese, 4.5% Filipino, 4.1% Latin American, 2.0% West Asian, 1.8% Korean, 1.1% Indigenous, 1.0% Arab, 1.0% Southeast Asian
Languages: 62.3% English, 3.7% Spanish, 2.9% Portuguese, 2.2% Tagalog, 1.8% French, 1.8% Mandarin, 1.6% Italian, 1.5% Russian, 1.5% Persian, 1.3% Korean, 1.3% Cantonese
Religions: 40.9% Christian (21.1% Catholic, 3.7% Anglican, 3.5% Christian Orthodox, 2.1% United Church, 10.5% Other), 15.1% Jewish, 3.7% Muslim, 3.2% Hindu, 1.1% Buddhist, 34.8% None

Median income: $50,400 (2020)
Average income: $96,000 (2020)

== History ==
The riding of Toronto—St. Pauls was created in 1933 from parts of the Toronto East Centre, Toronto Northeast, Toronto South and Toronto West Centre ridings.

It consisted initially of the central part of the City of Toronto ("Downtown Toronto"). It was bounded on the south by Toronto Bay, on the east by Sherbourne Street and on the north and west by a line drawn from Sherbourne Street west along Bloor Street, north along Yonge Street, northwest along the belt line railway, south and west along the western limit of the city, south along Dunvegan Road, east along St. Clair Avenue, south along Poplar Plains Road, west along Dupont Street, south along St. George and Beverley Streets, east along Queen Street, south along John Street.

In 1947, it was redefined to consist of the part of the city of Toronto bounded on the south by Toronto Bay, on the east by a line drawn from the Bay north along Sherbourne Street, west along Bloor Street East and north along Yonge Street, on the north by the south boundary of Ward Nine of the city of Toronto, and on the west by a line drawn from the Bay north on John Street, west along Queen Street West, north on Beverley Street and along St. George Street, east along Dupont Street, north along Davenport Road and Poplar Plains Road, west along St. Clair Avenue West, north along Dunvegan Road, east and north along the city limit to the southern boundary of Ward Nine.

In 1966, the southern part of the riding, what would be considered to be "Downtown Toronto" was removed from the electoral district (added to Rosedale electoral district) and the riding was shifted northward redefined to consist of the part of Metropolitan Toronto bounded by a line drawn from Bloor Street, north along Yonge Street, northwest along the Canadian National Railway line, north along Elmsthorpe Avenue, west along Eglinton Avenue, north along Castlewood Road, west along Briar Hill Avenue, south along Old Park Road and Glen Cedar Road, southeast along Claxton Boulevard, south along Bathurst Street and east along Bloor Street to Yonge Street.

In 1976, the riding lost its territory south of CP Railway to Spadina, while its eastern boundary was moved to Yonge Street, taking in a chunk of Eglinton, and its western boundary was shifted westward, following (from south to north) Christie Street, St. Clair Avenue, Humewood Drive, the Toronto city limit, Vaughan Road, Eglinton Avenue and the city limit again, taking in parts of York South and Trinity.

In 1987, it was redefined to consist of the part of the cities of Toronto and York bounded by a line drawn from the Canadian Pacific Railway line north along Ossington Avenue, east along Davenport Road, north along Winona Drive, west along Eglinton Avenue West, north and east along the eastern limit of the City of York, east and north along the northern limit of the City of Toronto, south along Yonge Street and westerly along the CPR line to Ossington Avenue (removing lands between the CPR lands and Bloor Street).

In 1996, it was redefined to consist of the part of the cities of Toronto and York bounded by a line drawn from the Canadian Pacific Railway north along Ossington Avenue, east along Davenport Road, north along Winona Drive, west along Eglinton Avenue West, north along the eastern limit of the City of York, east along the northern limit of the City of Toronto, south along Bathurst Street, southeast along the Belt Line (formerly the Canadian National Railway), east along Eglinton Avenue West, north along Yonge Street, east along Broadway Avenue, south and east along the eastern limit of the City of Toronto, west along the south side of the Mount Pleasant Cemetery, south along the ravine situated east of Avoca Avenue, west along Rosehill Avenue, south and east along the west side of the Rosehill Reservoir, west along Woodlawn Avenue East, south along Yonge Street, and west along the Canadian Pacific Railway to Ossington Avenue.

In 2003, it was redefined to consist of the part of the City of Toronto bounded by a line drawn from the Canadian Pacific Railway north along Ossington Avenue, east along Davenport Road, north along Winona Drive, west along Holland Park Avenue, north along Oakwood Avenue, west along Rogers Road, north along Dufferin Street, east along Eglinton Avenue West, north along Yonge Street, east along Broadway Avenue, south along the former eastern limit of the City of Toronto, west along the south side of the Mount Pleasant Cemetery, southeast along the Don River Tributary situated east of Avoca Avenue, west along Rosehill Avenue, south along the west side of the Rosehill Reservoir, west along Jackes Avenue, south along Yonge Street and west along the Canadian Pacific Railway to Ossington Avenue.

In the 2012 electoral redistribution, St. Paul's lost territory to Don Valley West, gained a small fraction from Davenport and was renamed Toronto—St. Paul's.

Following the 2022 Canadian federal electoral redistribution, the riding will gain the remainder of Davisville Village from Don Valley West, and the area north of the CPR (Moore Park area) in University—Rosedale. It will lose the area south of Vaughan Road and west of Winona Drive (in Oakwood Village) to Davenport.

== Members of Parliament ==
This riding has elected the following members of Parliament:

Parliament	Years	Member	Party
St. Paul's; Riding created from Toronto East Centre, Toronto Northeast, Toronto South and Toronto West Centre
18th	1935–1940	Douglas Ross	Conservative
19th	1940–1945	Douglas Ross	Conservative
20th	1945–1949	Douglas Ross	Conservative
21st	1949–1953	James Rooney	Liberal
22nd	1953–1957	Roland Michener	Progressive Conservative
23rd	1957–1958	Roland Michener	Progressive Conservative
24th	1958–1962	Roland Michener	Progressive Conservative
25th	1962–1963	Ian Wahn	Liberal
26th	1963–1965	Ian Wahn	Liberal
27th	1965–1968	Ian Wahn	Liberal
28th	1968–1972	Ian Wahn	Liberal
29th	1972–1974	Ron Atkey	Progressive Conservative
30th	1974–1979	John Roberts	Liberal
31st	1979–1980	Ron Atkey	Progressive Conservative
32nd	1980–1984	John Roberts	Liberal
33rd	1984–1988	Barbara McDougall	Progressive Conservative
34th	1988–1993	Barbara McDougall	Progressive Conservative
35th	1993–1997	Barry Campbell	Liberal
36th	1997–2000	Carolyn Bennett	Liberal
37th	2000–2004	Carolyn Bennett	Liberal
38th	2004–2006	Carolyn Bennett	Liberal
39th	2006–2008	Carolyn Bennett	Liberal
40th	2008–2011	Carolyn Bennett	Liberal
41st	2011–2015	Carolyn Bennett	Liberal
Toronto—St. Paul's
42nd	2015–2019	Carolyn Bennett	Liberal
43rd	2019–2021	Carolyn Bennett	Liberal
44th	2021–2024	Carolyn Bennett	Liberal
44th	2024–2025	Don Stewart	Conservative
45th	2025–present	Leslie Church	Liberal

== Election results ==
=== Toronto—St. Paul's, 2015–present ===
2025 Canadian federal election
Party	Candidate	Votes	%	±%	Expenditures
Liberal	Leslie Church	44,313	61.88	+12.37	$110,688.39
Conservative	Don Stewart	23,708	33.11	+6.60	$126,234.47
New Democratic	Bruce Levy	2,506	3.50	−12.39	16,112.01
Green	Shane Philips	552	0.77	−4.79	none listed
People's	Joseph Frasca	329	0.46	−2.04	none listed
Marxist–Leninist	David Gershuny	147	0.21	N/A	none listed
Canadian Future	Cynthia Valdron	58	0.08	N/A	none listed
Total valid votes/expense limit					
Total rejected ballots					
Turnout		71,613	74.05		
Eligible voters		96,713			
Liberal notional hold		Swing		+2.89	
Note: The changes in percentage value and swing were calculated using the redistributed results of the 2021 general election, not the 2024 by-election. The seat of Toronto—St. Paul's was won by the Liberals in 2021, but the seat was held by the Conservatives since 2024 following the by-election.
Source: Elections Canada

2021 federal election redistributed results
Party	Vote	%
Liberal	30,023	49.51
Conservative	16,076	26.51
New Democratic	9,638	15.89
Green	3,373	5.56
People's	1,513	2.50
Others	18	0.03

Canadian federal by-election, June 24, 2024 Resignation of Carolyn Bennett
Party	Candidate	Votes	%	±%
Conservative	Don Stewart	15,565	42.11	+16.81
Liberal	Leslie Church	14,932	40.40	-8.82
New Democratic	Amrit Parhar	4,073	11.02	-5.81
Green	Christian Cullis	1,057	2.86	-3.13
People's	Dennis Wilson	238	0.64	-2.02
Independent	Jonathan Schachter	97	0.26	
Independent	Mário Stocco	82	0.22	
Marxist–Leninist	Meñico Turcotte	59	0.16	
Rhinoceros	Sean Carson	51	0.14	
Independent	Thibaud Mony	51	0.14	
Independent	Glen MacDonald	42	0.11	
Independent	Mélodie Anderson	39	0.11	
Independent	Demetrios Karavas	37	0.10	
No Affiliation	Stephen Davis	36	0.10	
Independent	Jordan Wong	31	0.08	
Marijuana	Danny Légaré	30	0.08	
Independent	Alex Banks	27	0.07	
Centrist	Ali Mohiuddin	26	0.07	
Independent	Jaël Champagne Gareau	23	0.06	
Independent	Michael Bednarski	18	0.05	
Independent	John Dale	18	0.05	
Independent	Pierre Larochelle	17	0.05	
Independent	Joshua Bram Hieu Pham	17	0.05	
Independent	Marie-Hélène LeBel	16	0.04	
Independent	Guillaume Paradis	16	0.04	
Independent	Daniel Andrew Graham	13	0.04	
Independent	Pierre Granger	13	0.04	
Independent	Julie St-Amand	13	0.04	
Independent	Loren Hicks	12	0.03	
Independent	Matéo Martin	12	0.03	
Independent	Blake Hamilton	11	0.03	
Independent	Line Bélanger	10	0.02	
Independent	Charles Currie	10	0.03	
Independent	Cory Deville	10	0.03	
Independent	Alexandra Engering	10	0.03	
Independent	Daniel Stuckless	10	0.03	
Independent	Erle Stanley Bowman	9	0.02	
Independent	Anthony Hamel	9	0.02	
Independent	Pascal St-Amand	9	0.02	
Independent	Sébastien CoRhino	8	0.02	
Independent	Mark Dejewski	8	0.02	
Independent	Daniel Gagnon	8	0.02	
Independent	Agnieszka Marszalek	8	0.02	
Independent	Olivier Renaud	8	0.02	
Independent	Patrick Strzalkowski	8	0.02	
Independent	Donald Gagnon	7	0.02	
Independent	Benjamin Teichman	7	0.02	
Independent	MarthaLee Aykroyd	6	0.02	
Independent	Myriam Beaulieu	6	0.02	
Independent	Kubera Desai	6	0.02	
Independent	Donovan Eckstrom	6	0.02	
Independent	Kevin Krisa	6	0.02	
Independent	Lorant Polya	6	0.02	
Independent	Roger Sherwood	6	0.02	
Independent	Elliot Wand	6	0.02	
Independent	Michal Wieczorek	6	0.02	
Independent	Maxime Boivin	5	0.01	
Independent	Martin Acetaria Caesar Jubinville	5	0.01	
Independent	Jean-Denis Parent Boudreault	4	0.01	
Independent	Léthycia-Félix Corriveau	4	0.01	
Independent	Ysack Dupont	4	0.01	
Independent	Dji-Pé Frazer	4	0.01	
Independent	Zornitsa Halacheva	4	0.01	
Independent	Alain Lamontagne	4	0.01	
Independent	Renée Lemieux	4	0.01	
Independent	Danimal Preston	4	0.01	
Independent	Spencer Rocchi	4	0.01	
Independent	Yogo Shimada	4	0.01	
Independent	Darcy Vanderwater	4	0.01	
Independent	Mylène Bonneau	3	0.01	
Independent	Guillaume Gagnier-Michel	3	0.01	
Independent	Kerri Hildebrandt	3	0.01	
Independent	Krzysztof Krzywinski	3	0.01	
Independent	Connie Lukawski	3	0.01	
Independent	Wallace Richard Rowat	3	0.01	
Independent	Gavin Vanderwater	3	0.01	
Independent	Alain Bourgault	2	0.01	
No Affiliation	Manon Marie Lili Desbiens	2	0.01	
Independent	Gerrit Dogger	2	0.01	
Independent	Samuel Ducharme	2	0.01	
Independent	Yusuf Kadir Nasihi	2	0.01	
Independent	Winston Neutel	2	0.01	
Independent	Jacques Saintonge	2	0.01	
Independent	Felix-Antoine Hamel	0	0.00	
Total valid votes		36,962		
Total rejected ballots				
Turnout			43.52	-21.96
Eligible voters		84,934		
Conservative gain from Liberal		Swing		+12.76

2021 Canadian federal election
Party	Candidate	Votes	%	±%	Expenditures
Liberal	Carolyn Bennett	26,429	49.22	-5.09	$88,807.52
Conservative	Stephanie Osadchuk	13,587	25.30	+3.69	$26,751.24
New Democratic	Sidney Coles	9,036	16.83	+1.05	$31,250.09
Green	Phil De Luna	3,214	5.99	-0.77	$30,817.63
People's	Peter Remedios	1,432	2.67	+1.12	$1,412.77
Total valid votes/expense limit		53,698	98.93	–	$112,245.61
Total rejected ballots		580	1.07	+0.43	
Turnout		54,278	65.48	-4.91	
Eligible voters		82,891			
Liberal hold		Swing		-4.39	
Source: Elections Canada

2019 Canadian federal election
Party	Candidate	Votes	%	±%	Expenditures
Liberal	Carolyn Bennett	32,494	54.31	-0.95	$88,263.67
Conservative	Jae Truesdell	12,933	21.61	-5.37	$95,161.27
New Democratic	Alok Mukherjee	9,442	15.78	+1.06	$48,947.09
Green	Sarah Climenhaga	4,042	6.76	+3.72	$447.10
People's	John Kellen	923	1.54	-	$0.00
Total valid votes/expense limit		59,834	99.04		
Total rejected ballots		384	0.64	+0.20	
Turnout		60,218	70.39	-2.15	
Eligible voters		85,544			
Liberal hold		Swing		+2.21	
Source: Elections Canada

2015 Canadian federal election
Party	Candidate	Votes	%	±%	Expenditures
Liberal	Carolyn Bennett	31,481	55.26	+15.33	$128,256.52
Conservative	Marnie MacDougall	15,376	26.99	-5.43	$186,719.71
New Democratic	Noah Richler	8,386	14.72	-7.91	$53,022.76
Green	Kevin Farmer	1,729	3.03	-1.44	$3,643.09
Total valid votes/Expense limit		56,972	99.56		$210,412.41
Total rejected ballots		252	0.44		
Turnout		57,224	72.54	–	
Eligible voters		78,885			
Liberal hold		Swing		+10.38	
Source: Elections Canada

2011 federal election redistributed results
Party	Vote	%
Liberal	19,563	39.92
Conservative	15,887	32.42
New Democratic	11,088	22.63
Green	2,195	4.48
Libertarian	267	0.54

=== St. Paul's, 1935–2015 ===
2011 Canadian federal election
Party	Candidate	Votes	%	±%	Expenditures
Liberal	Carolyn Bennett	22,409	40.60	−10.01	
Conservative	Maureen Harquail	17,864	32.37	+5.51	
New Democratic	William Molls	12,124	21.97	+9.13	
Green	Jim McGarva	2,495	4.52	−4.58	
Libertarian	John Kittredge	303	0.55	−0.05	
Total valid votes/Expense limit		55,195	99.50		
Total rejected ballots		276	0.50	+0.00	
Turnout		55,471	66.54	+2.56	
Eligible voters		83,367	–	–	
Liberal hold		Swing		−7.76	

2008 Canadian federal election
Party	Candidate	Votes	%	±%	Expenditures
Liberal	Carolyn Bennett	26,286	50.61	+0.35	$69,331
Conservative	Heather Jewell	13,948	26.86	+1.09	$53,617
New Democratic	Anita Agrawal	6,666	12.83	-6.36	$13,606
Green	Justin Erdman	4,726	9.10	+4.32	$3,526
Libertarian	John Kittredge	312	0.60	–	$182
Total valid votes/Expense limit		51,938	99.51	$86,488	
Total rejected ballots		258	0.49	+0.05	
Turnout		52,196	63.98	-8.20	
Eligible voters		81,588	–	–	
Liberal hold		Swing		-0.37	

2006 Canadian federal election
Party	Candidate	Votes	%	±%
Liberal	Carolyn Bennett	29,295	50.26	-8.13
Conservative	Peter Kent	15,021	25.77	+5.39
New Democratic	Paul Summerville	11,189	19.20	+3.46
Green	Kevin Farmer	2,785	4.78	-0.72
Total valid votes		58,290	99.56	
Total rejected ballots		258	0.44	+0.05
Turnout		58,548	72.17	+4.05
Eligible voters		81,121	–	–
Liberal hold		Swing		-6.76

2004 Canadian federal election
Party	Candidate	Votes	%	±%
Liberal	Carolyn Bennett	32,171	58.39	+3.12
Conservative	Barry Cline	11,226	20.38	-11.58*
New Democratic	Norman Tobias	8,667	15.73	+6.30
Green	Peter Elgie	3,031	5.50	
Total valid votes		55,095	99.61	
Total rejected ballots		216	0.39	
Turnout		55,311	68.12	
Eligible voters		81,196	–	–
Liberal hold		Swing		+7.35

*Comparison to total of Progressive Conservative and Canadian Alliance vote in 2000. Votes compared to 2000 transposed result.

2000 federal election redistributed results
Party	Vote	%
Liberal	25,631	55.27
Progressive Conservative	9,483	20.45
Canadian Alliance	5,338	11.51
New Democratic	4,375	9.43
Others	1,548	3.34

2000 Canadian federal election
Party	Candidate	Votes	%	±%
Liberal	Carolyn Bennett	25,358	54.01	-0.24
Progressive Conservative	Barry Cline	10,099	21.51	-2.17
Alliance	Theo Caldwell	5,457	11.62	+4.30
New Democratic	Guy Hunter	4,451	9.48	-2.91
Green	Don Roebuck	769	1.64	+0.41
Marijuana	Andrew Potter	514	1.09	
Canadian Action	Mark Till	128	0.27	-0.10
Marxist–Leninist	Barbara Seed	88	0.19	-0.09
Natural Law	Ron Parker	83	0.18	-0.28
Total valid votes		46,947	99.62	
Total rejected ballots		181	0.38	-0.27
Turnout		47,128	59.25	-9.86
Eligible voters		79,543	–	–
Liberal hold		Swing		+0.97

Note: Canadian Alliance vote is compared to the Reform vote in 1997 election.

1997 Canadian federal election
Party	Candidate	Votes	%	±%
Liberal	Carolyn Bennett	26,389	54.26	-0.26
Progressive Conservative	Peter Atkins	11,520	23.69	+0.64
New Democratic	Michael Halewood	6,028	12.39	+6.97
Reform	Francis Floszmann	3,564	7.33	-4.89
Green	Don Roebuck	597	1.23	
Natural Law	Neil Dickie	221	0.45	
Canadian Action	Daniel Widdicombe	182	0.37	
Marxist–Leninist	Fernand Deschamps	135	0.28	
Total valid votes		48,636	99.34	
Total rejected ballots		322	0.66	
Turnout		48,958	69.11	
Eligible voters		70,843	–	–
Liberal hold		Swing		-0.45

1993 federal election redistributed results
Party	Vote	%
Liberal	27,664	54.52
Progressive Conservative	11,692	23.04
Reform	6,201	12.22
New Democratic	2,754	5.43
Others	2,431	4.79

1993 Canadian federal election
Party	Candidate	Votes	%	±%
Liberal	Barry Campbell	27,775	54.30	+13.46
Progressive Conservative	Isabel Bassett	12,499	24.44	-23.10
Reform	Paul Chaplin	5,727	11.20	
New Democratic	David Jacobs	2,641	5.16	-4.84
National	Mario Godlewski	1,259	2.46	
Green	Jim Harris	481	0.94	+0.28
Natural Law	Rick C. Weberg	313	0.61	
Independent	Jim Conrad	245	0.48	
Libertarian	Rick Stenhouse	108	0.21	-0.44
Marxist–Leninist	David Gershuny	75	0.15	
Abolitionist	Marion Velma Joyce	17	0.03	
Commonwealth of Canada	Mike Twose	11	0.02	
Total valid votes		51,151	100.00	
Liberal gain from Progressive Conservative		Swing		+18.28

1988 Canadian federal election
Party	Candidate	Votes	%	±%
Progressive Conservative	Barbara McDougall	25,206	47.53	-0.7
Liberal	Aideen Nicholson	21,655	40.84	+4.4
New Democratic	Diane Bull	5,303	10.00	-3.4
Green	Philip Sarazen	348	0.66	
Libertarian	Christian P. Sorensen	346	0.65	
Communist	John MacClennan	171	0.32	
Total valid votes		53,029	100.00	
Progressive Conservative hold		Swing		-2.6

1984 federal election redistributed results
Party	%
Progressive Conservative	48.2
Liberal	36.4
New Democratic	13.4
Others	1.9

1984 Canadian federal election
Party	Candidate	Votes	%	±%
Progressive Conservative	Barbara McDougall	20,914	47.56	+8.02
Liberal	John Roberts	16,659	37.88	-7.37
New Democratic	John Webb	5,545	12.61	-0.79
Green	Joell Vanderwagen	514	1.17	
Libertarian	Jocelyne Demers	210	0.48	+0.07
Communist	Gerry Van Houten	99	0.23	+0.03
Commonwealth of Canada	William Gerby	36	0.08	
Total valid votes		43,977	100.00	
Progressive Conservative gain from Liberal		Swing		+7.70

1980 Canadian federal election
Party	Candidate	Votes	%	±%
Liberal	John Roberts	17,905	45.25	+3.95
Progressive Conservative	Ron Atkey	15,643	39.54	-4.55
New Democratic	James Lockyer	5,301	13.40	+0.10
Rhinoceros	Liza Armour	311	0.79	+0.52
Libertarian	Dan A. Kornitzer	162	0.41	-0.33
Independent	Robert Smith	108	0.27	
Communist	Mel Doig	76	0.19	-0.03
Independent	Naomi Jolliffe	37	0.09	
Marxist–Leninist	Keith Ramdeen	22	0.06	-0.01
Total valid votes		39,565	100.00	
Liberal gain from Progressive Conservative		Swing		+4.25

1979 Canadian federal election
Party	Candidate	Votes	%	±%
Progressive Conservative	Ron Atkey	19,161	44.09	+0.96
Liberal	John Roberts	17,949	41.30	-4.85
New Democratic	James Lockyer	5,779	13.30	+3.47
Libertarian	Ronald F. Bailey	325	0.75	
Rhinoceros	Jacques Gauthier	117	0.27	
Communist	Ruth Fitzgerald	97	0.22	
Marxist–Leninist	Nola Moore	29	0.07	
Total valid votes		43,457	100.00	
Progressive Conservative gain from Liberal		Swing		+2.90

1974 federal election redistributed results
Party	%
Liberal	46.15
Progressive Conservative	43.13
New Democratic	9.83
Others	0.89

1974 Canadian federal election
Party	Candidate	Votes	%	±%
Liberal	John Roberts	16,124	45.54	+6.23
Progressive Conservative	Ron Atkey	15,010	42.39	-0.15
New Democratic	Lukin Robinson	3,913	11.05	-0.82
Communist	Barbara Cameron	165	0.47	
Independent	Richard Carl Bolster	138	0.39	
Marxist–Leninist	Crawford McNair	56	0.16	+0.03
Total valid votes		35,406	100.00	
Liberal gain from Progressive Conservative		Swing		+3.19

1972 Canadian federal election
Party	Candidate	Votes	%	±%
Progressive Conservative	Ron Atkey	15,676	42.54	+11.73
Liberal	Ian Wahn	14,484	39.31	-20.10
New Democratic	Mary Boyce	4,376	11.88	+4.11
Independent	Kay Macpherson	2,044	5.55	
Independent	Elizabeth Hill	133	0.36	
Social Credit	John Bilan	87	0.24	
Independent	Crawford McNair	48	0.13	
Total valid votes		36,848	100.00	
Progressive Conservative gain from Liberal		Swing		+15.91

1968 Canadian federal election
Party	Candidate	Votes	%	±%
Liberal	Ian Wahn	20,981	59.4	+10.9
Progressive Conservative	Barry Lowes	10,882	30.8	-1.6
New Democratic	Robert Fenn	2,743	7.8	-11.3
Independent	W.J. Russell Taylor	420	1.2	
Communist	Rae Allan Murphy	292	0.8	
Total valid votes		35,318	100.0	

1965 Canadian federal election
Party	Candidate	Votes	%	±%
Liberal	Ian Wahn	12,251	48.5	-8.2
Progressive Conservative	Ward Markle	8,204	32.5	+4.6
New Democratic	Alan Rimmer	4,821	19.1	+5.5
Total valid votes		25,276	100.0	

1963 Canadian federal election
Party	Candidate	Votes	%	±%
Liberal	Ian Wahn	15,891	56.7	+14.8
Progressive Conservative	Joel W. Aldred	7,795	27.8	-13.6
New Democratic	Don Stevenson	3,794	13.5	+0.2
Social Credit	Neil Carmichael	543	1.9	-0.2
Total valid votes		28,023	100.0	

1962 Canadian federal election
Party	Candidate	Votes	%	±%
Liberal	Ian Wahn	11,140	41.9	+16.3
Progressive Conservative	Roland Michener	11,013	41.4	-23.4
New Democratic	Don Stevenson	3,533	13.3	+3.7
Social Credit	Neil Carmichael	563	2.1	
Independent	Douglas Campbell	328	1.2	
Total valid votes		26,577	100.0	

Note: NDP vote is compared to CCF vote in 1958 election.

1958 Canadian federal election
Party	Candidate	Votes	%	±%
Progressive Conservative	Roland Michener	18,213	64.8	+7.9
Liberal	Joseph S. Williams	7,212	25.7	-2.6
Co-operative Commonwealth	Margot Thompson	2,686	9.6	-2.9
Total valid votes		28,111	100.0	

1957 Canadian federal election
Party	Candidate	Votes	%	±%
Progressive Conservative	Roland Michener	13,243	56.9	+15.4
Liberal	James Rooney	6,586	28.3	-11.0
Co-operative Commonwealth	Margot Thompson	2,906	12.5	-3.6
Social Credit	Burton Ford	533	2.3	+0.7
Total valid votes		23,268	100.0	

1953 Canadian federal election
Party	Candidate	Votes	%	±%
Progressive Conservative	Roland Michener	9,738	41.5	+3.0
Liberal	James Rooney	9,223	39.3	-2.4
Co-operative Commonwealth	Andrew Brewin	3,786	16.1	-3.7
Communist	Annie Buller Guralnick	369	1.6	
Social Credit	Neil Carmichael	363	1.5	
Total valid votes		23,479	100.0	

1949 Canadian federal election
Party	Candidate	Votes	%	±%
Liberal	James Rooney	14,000	41.7	+1.6
Progressive Conservative	Roland Michener	12,922	38.5	-2.2
Co-operative Commonwealth	Andrew F. Brewin	6,677	19.9	+3.6
Total valid votes		33,599	100.0	

1945 Canadian federal election
Party	Candidate	Votes	%	±%
Progressive Conservative	Douglas Ross	12,390	40.7	-10.6
Liberal	James Rooney	12,211	40.1	-8.6
Co-operative Commonwealth	Andrew F. Brewin	4,958	16.3	
Labour Progressive	William Kashtan	895	2.9	
Total valid votes		30,454	100.0	

Note: Progressive Conservative vote is compared to "National Government" vote in 1940 election.

1940 Canadian federal election
Party	Candidate	Votes	%	±%
National Government	Douglas Ross	15,591	51.3	+10.3
Liberal	James Rooney	14,816	48.7	+9.8
Total valid votes		30,407	100.0	

Note: "National Government" vote is compared to Conservative vote in 1935 election.

1935 Canadian federal election
Party	Candidate	Votes	%
Conservative	Douglas Ross	10,852	40.9
Liberal	Salter Hayden	10,322	38.9
Reconstruction	James Robertson	2,713	10.2
Co-operative Commonwealth	Ted Jolliffe	2,628	9.9
Total valid votes		26,515	100.0

== See also ==
- List of Canadian electoral districts
- Historical federal electoral districts of Canada
