= Finn the Half-Great =

2009 book by Theo Caldwell

- Author: Theo Caldwell
- Language: English
- Publisher: Tundra Books
- Publication date: 2009
- Publication place: Canada
- Pages: 382
- ISBN: 978-0-88776-931-3
- OCLC: 294640003

Finn the Half-Great is a 2009 fiction novel written by Canadian author and columnist Theo Caldwell. The book is published by Tundra Books in Toronto, Ontario, Canada.

== Plot ==
The story takes place in Ireland and revolves around the story of Fionn mac Cumhaill, commonly known as Finn McCool in Irish folklore. It also includes elements from Norse, Japanese and English mythology.

== Reception ==
The novel, aimed at a young audience aged 10 and over, was included in the Toronto Star's Holiday Reads of 2009. Quill & Quire, which published a review of the book, called it "a quest fantasy with moments of humour and high emotion, epic battles and daring deeds", however it was also described as "half-great" by the School Library Journal.

Theo Caldwell has stated his intention to publish a second novel, Finn the half-Great and the Death of Gogmagog, as part of a five-book series.
