= List of ambassadors of Canada to Denmark =

Ambassador of Canada to Denmark
- Incumbent; Carolyn Bennett since May 24, 2024
- Seat: Embassy of Canada, Copenhagen
- Nominator: Prime Minister of Canada
- Appointer: Governor General of Canada
- Term length: At His Majesty's pleasure
- Inaugural holder: John Doherty Kearney
- Formation: December 5, 1945

The ambassador of Canada to Denmark is the official representative of the Canadian government to the government of Denmark. The official title for the ambassador is Ambassador Extraordinary and Plenipotentiary of Canada to the Kingdom of Denmark. The ambassador of Canada to Denmark is former physician and politician Carolyn Bennett.

The Embassy of Canada is located at Kristen Bernikowsgade 1, 1105 Copenhagen K., Denmark.

== History of diplomatic relations ==
Diplomatic relations between Canada and Denmark were established on December 5, 1945, with the first envoy, John Doherty Kearney, appointed on the advice of Prime Minister W.L. Mackenzie King on the same day. Canada's legation was established on September 1, 1947, and raised to full embassy status on January 16, 1956.

== List of ambassadors of Canada to Denmark ==
No.	Name	Term of office			Career	Prime Minister nominated by	Ref.
No.	Name	Start date	PoC.	End date	Career	Prime Minister nominated by	Ref.
1	John Doherty Kearney	December 5, 1945	April 4, 1946	1946	Non-career	W. L. Mackenzie King (1935–1948)	
2	Jean François Léon Henri Laureys	March 15, 1947	July 12, 1947	August 14, 1950	Non-career	W. L. Mackenzie King (1935–1948)	
–	Donald Macalister Cornett (Chargé d'Affaires)	August 14, 1950		April 7, 1952	Career	Louis St. Laurent (1948–1957)	
3	Edgar D'Arcy McGreer	February 28, 1952	April 7, 1952	December 1, 1954	Career	Louis St. Laurent (1948–1957)	
4	Herbert Frederick Brooks-Hill Feaver	November 18, 1954	December 11, 1954	January 16, 1956	Career	Louis St. Laurent (1948–1957)	
5	Herbert Frederick Brooks-Hill Feaver	January 11, 1956	January 16, 1956	July 17, 1958	Career	Louis St. Laurent (1948–1957)	
6	John Watkins	August 30, 1958	December 2, 1958	1960	Career	John G. Diefenbaker (1957–1963)	
7	Hector Allard	October 31, 1960	January 12, 1961	June 23, 1967	Career	John G. Diefenbaker (1957–1963)	
8	Max Hirsch Wershof	February 17, 1967	July 17, 1967	August 10, 1971	Career	Lester B. Pearson (1963–1968)	
9	Donald Macalister Cornett	July 8, 1971	September 16, 1971	July 29, 1975	Career	Pierre Elliott Trudeau (1968–1979)	
10	Norman Frederick Henderson Berlis	July 17, 1975	October 7, 1975	April 6, 1979	Career	Pierre Elliott Trudeau (1968–1979)	
11	Marion Adams Macpherson	September 27, 1979	December 20, 1979	July 25, 1983	Career	Joe Clark (1979–1980)	
–	Thomas George Cullen (Chargé d'Affaires)	July 1983		January 1984	Career	Pierre Elliott Trudeau (1980–1984)	
12	Erik Benkestock Wang	April 5, 1984	January 5, 1984	1986	Career	Pierre Elliott Trudeau (1980–1984)	
13	Dorothy Jane Armstrong	July 23, 1986	November 6, 1986	August 19, 1991	Career	Brian Mulroney (1984–1993)	
14	Ronald Stuart MacLean	September 19, 1991	August 29, 1991	October 29, 1992	Career	Brian Mulroney (1984–1993)	
15	Ernest Hébert	June 23, 1993	March 2, 1993	1995	Career	Brian Mulroney (1984–1993)	
16	Brian Baker	May 3, 1995		1999	Career	Jean Chrétien (1993–2003)	
17	Mary Simon	August 11, 1999		2001	Non-career	Jean Chrétien (1993–2003)	
18	Alfonso Gagliano	January 15, 2002		February 10, 2004	Non-career	Jean Chrétien (1993–2003)	
19	Fredericka Gregory	May 19, 2004	September 22, 2004	2008	Career	Paul Martin (2003–2006)	
20	Peter Lundy	July 4, 2008		2012	Career	Stephen Harper (2006–2015)	
21	André François Giroux	August 20, 2012		2016	Career	Stephen Harper (2006–2015)	
22	Emi Furuya	July 18, 2016	November 4, 2016	2020	Career	Justin Trudeau (2015–2025)	
23	Denis Robert	September 24, 2020	April 20, 2021		Career	Justin Trudeau (2015–2025)	
24	Carolyn Bennett	January 19, 2024	May 24, 2024		Non-career	Justin Trudeau (2015–2025)	

== See also ==
- Canada–Denmark relations
