= Douglas Ross (Canadian politician) =

Canadian politician

Member of Parliament for St. Paul's
- In office 1935–1949
- Preceded by: first member
- Succeeded by: James Rooney

Personal details
- Born: 15 December 1883 Toronto, Ontario, Canada
- Died: 24 August 1961 (aged 77)
- Party: Conservative; National Government; Progressive Conservative
- Profession: Businessman

Douglas Gooderham Ross (15 December 1883 – 24 August 1961) was a Canadian politician and businessman. Ross represented the riding of St. Paul's from 1935 to 1949. He was a member of the Conservatives, and later the Progressive Conservatives.

Ross's bête noires during his parliamentary career were Liberal Prime Minister William Lyon Mackenzie King, the Canadian Broadcasting Corporation and government bureaucracy - all of which he railed against as an MP.

He accused King of encouraging Hitler by turning down a British request in 1937 to train 25,000 airmen a year, and subsequently criticized the government for its increasing economic reliance on trade with the "unstable" United States rather than the "stable" United Kingdom. He later implied that King was responsible for the war for not having articulated a clear policy within the British Commonwealth.

Once World War II began, Ross urged the registration of all men and women in the country as a war measure in order to mobilize all Canadian resources for the war effort and to curb espionage. After the war, he advocated universal voluntary military training for high school and university students.

Ross criticized Max Ferguson's popular satirical Rawhide show as "meaningless ravings and tripe" and as an insult to the intelligence of Canadians.

In his professional life, Ross was vice-president of the Dominion of Canada General Insurance Company.
