= Don Stewart (Ontario politician) =

Canadian politician

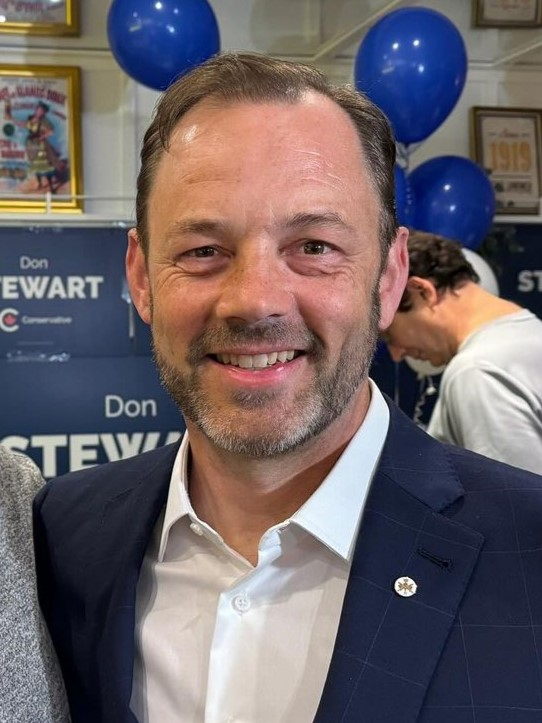
- Stewart in 2024

Member of Parliament for Toronto—St. Paul's
- In office June 24, 2024 – April 28, 2025
- Preceded by: Carolyn Bennett
- Succeeded by: Leslie Church

Personal details
- Born: Donald Stewart Toronto
- Party: Conservative
- Education: Queen’s University (BASc),(MBA)

Donald Stewart is a Canadian politician. A member of the Conservative Party of Canada, he was elected Member of Parliament (MP) for Toronto—St. Paul's in a 2024 by-election. He was the first Conservative to represent the riding in over three decades and the first Conservative candidate to win a riding in Toronto since 2011. Amid a Liberal rebound in the polls, he lost in the subsequent 2025 election.

== Personal life ==
Stewart lives in Toronto with his family.

Stewart completed an undergraduate degree in engineering and a master’s degree in business administration from Queen's University.

Stewart previously worked as a director at BMO Capital Markets and Morgan Stanley. Stewart worked for the Canadian Investment Regulatory Organization.

He has also been an honorary lieutenant-colonel in the Canadian Armed Forces, and is the treasurer of the 2 Intelligence Company Senate, a non-profit organization set up to support current and former members of 2 Intelligence Company, a primary reserve unit of the 32 Canadian Brigade Group in Toronto.

== Electoral record ==
2025 Canadian federal election: Toronto—St. Paul's
Party	Candidate	Votes	%	±%	Expenditures
Liberal	Leslie Church	44,313	61.88	+12.37	$110,688.39
Conservative	Don Stewart	23,708	33.11	+6.60	$126,234.47
New Democratic	Bruce Levy	2,506	3.50	−12.39	16,112.01
Green	Shane Philips	552	0.77	−4.79	none listed
People's	Joseph Frasca	329	0.46	−2.04	none listed
Marxist–Leninist	David Gershuny	147	0.21	N/A	none listed
Canadian Future	Cynthia Valdron	58	0.08	N/A	none listed
Total valid votes/expense limit					
Total rejected ballots					
Turnout		71,613	74.05		
Eligible voters		96,713			
Liberal notional hold		Swing		+2.89	
Note: The changes in percentage value and swing were calculated using the redistributed results of the 2021 general election, not the 2024 by-election. The seat of Toronto—St. Paul's was won by the Liberals in 2021, but the seat was held by the Conservatives since 2024 following the by-election.
Source: Elections Canada

Canadian federal by-election, June 24, 2024: Toronto—St. Paul's Resignation of Carolyn Bennett
Party	Candidate	Votes	%	±%
Conservative	Don Stewart	15,565	42.11	+16.81
Liberal	Leslie Church	14,932	40.40	-8.82
New Democratic	Amrit Parhar	4,073	11.02	-5.81
Green	Christian Cullis	1,057	2.86	-3.13
People's	Dennis Wilson	238	0.64	-2.02
Independent	Jonathan Schachter	97	0.26	
Independent	Mário Stocco	82	0.22	
Marxist–Leninist	Meñico Turcotte	59	0.16	
Rhinoceros	Sean Carson	51	0.14	
Independent	Thibaud Mony	51	0.14	
Independent	Glen MacDonald	42	0.11	
Independent	Mélodie Anderson	39	0.11	
Independent	Demetrios Karavas	37	0.10	
No Affiliation	Stephen Davis	36	0.10	
Independent	Jordan Wong	31	0.08	
Marijuana	Danny Légaré	30	0.08	
Independent	Alex Banks	27	0.07	
Centrist	Ali Mohiuddin	26	0.07	
Independent	Jaël Champagne Gareau	23	0.06	
Independent	Michael Bednarski	18	0.05	
Independent	John Dale	18	0.05	
Independent	Pierre Larochelle	17	0.05	
Independent	Joshua Bram Hieu Pham	17	0.05	
Independent	Marie-Hélène LeBel	16	0.04	
Independent	Guillaume Paradis	16	0.04	
Independent	Daniel Andrew Graham	13	0.04	
Independent	Pierre Granger	13	0.04	
Independent	Julie St-Amand	13	0.04	
Independent	Loren Hicks	12	0.03	
Independent	Matéo Martin	12	0.03	
Independent	Blake Hamilton	11	0.03	
Independent	Line Bélanger	10	0.02	
Independent	Charles Currie	10	0.03	
Independent	Cory Deville	10	0.03	
Independent	Alexandra Engering	10	0.03	
Independent	Daniel Stuckless	10	0.03	
Independent	Erle Stanley Bowman	9	0.02	
Independent	Anthony Hamel	9	0.02	
Independent	Pascal St-Amand	9	0.02	
Independent	Sébastien CoRhino	8	0.02	
Independent	Mark Dejewski	8	0.02	
Independent	Daniel Gagnon	8	0.02	
Independent	Agnieszka Marszalek	8	0.02	
Independent	Olivier Renaud	8	0.02	
Independent	Patrick Strzalkowski	8	0.02	
Independent	Donald Gagnon	7	0.02	
Independent	Benjamin Teichman	7	0.02	
Independent	MarthaLee Aykroyd	6	0.02	
Independent	Myriam Beaulieu	6	0.02	
Independent	Kubera Desai	6	0.02	
Independent	Donovan Eckstrom	6	0.02	
Independent	Kevin Krisa	6	0.02	
Independent	Lorant Polya	6	0.02	
Independent	Roger Sherwood	6	0.02	
Independent	Elliot Wand	6	0.02	
Independent	Michal Wieczorek	6	0.02	
Independent	Maxime Boivin	5	0.01	
Independent	Martin Acetaria Caesar Jubinville	5	0.01	
Independent	Jean-Denis Parent Boudreault	4	0.01	
Independent	Léthycia-Félix Corriveau	4	0.01	
Independent	Ysack Dupont	4	0.01	
Independent	Dji-Pé Frazer	4	0.01	
Independent	Zornitsa Halacheva	4	0.01	
Independent	Alain Lamontagne	4	0.01	
Independent	Renée Lemieux	4	0.01	
Independent	Danimal Preston	4	0.01	
Independent	Spencer Rocchi	4	0.01	
Independent	Yogo Shimada	4	0.01	
Independent	Darcy Vanderwater	4	0.01	
Independent	Mylène Bonneau	3	0.01	
Independent	Guillaume Gagnier-Michel	3	0.01	
Independent	Kerri Hildebrandt	3	0.01	
Independent	Krzysztof Krzywinski	3	0.01	
Independent	Connie Lukawski	3	0.01	
Independent	Wallace Richard Rowat	3	0.01	
Independent	Gavin Vanderwater	3	0.01	
Independent	Alain Bourgault	2	0.01	
No Affiliation	Manon Marie Lili Desbiens	2	0.01	
Independent	Gerrit Dogger	2	0.01	
Independent	Samuel Ducharme	2	0.01	
Independent	Yusuf Kadir Nasihi	2	0.01	
Independent	Winston Neutel	2	0.01	
Independent	Jacques Saintonge	2	0.01	
Independent	Felix-Antoine Hamel	0	0.00	
Total valid votes		36,962		
Total rejected ballots				
Turnout			43.52	-21.96
Eligible voters		84,934		
Conservative gain from Liberal		Swing		+12.76
