= Ian Wahn =

Canadian politician

Ian Grant Wahn
- Official 1968 portrait

Member of Parliament for St. Paul's
- In office June 18, 1962 – October 29, 1972
- Preceded by: Roland Michener
- Succeeded by: Ron Atkey

Personal details
- Born: April 18, 1916 Herbert, Saskatchewan, Canada
- Died: September 14, 1999 (aged 83)
- Party: Liberal
- Profession: Lawyer

Ian Grant Wahn (April 18, 1916 – September 14, 1999) was a Canadian politician and lawyer. He was elected to the House of Commons of Canada as a Member of the Liberal Party in the riding of St. Paul's in the 1962 election. He was re-elected in 1963, 1965, 1968 and defeated in 1972. Prior to his federal political career, he was a captain in the Canadian Army (Supplementary Reserve).
