= Ron Atkey =

Canadian lawyer, professor and politician

The Honourable Ron Atkey PC

Member of Parliament for St. Paul's
- In office 1979–1980
- Preceded by: John Roberts
- Succeeded by: John Roberts
- In office 1972–1974
- Preceded by: Ian Wahn
- Succeeded by: John Roberts

Minister of Employment and Immigration
- In office June 4, 1979 – March 2, 1980
- Preceded by: Bud Cullen
- Succeeded by: Lloyd Axworthy

Personal details
- Born: February 15, 1942 Saint John, New Brunswick
- Died: May 9, 2017 (aged 75) Toronto, Ontario
- Party: Progressive Conservative
- Education: University of Western Ontario, Yale University
- Profession: Lawyer, law professor

Ronald George Atkey, PC QC (February 15, 1942 – May 9, 2017) was a Canadian lawyer, law professor and politician.

== Background ==
Atkey graduated in 1962 from the University of Western Ontario, and was a member of the Kappa Alpha Society while in university. He also obtained law degrees from Yale University and the University of Western Ontario.

== Politics ==
Atkey was elected to the House of Commons of Canada as the Progressive Conservative (Tory) Member of Parliament (MP) for the Toronto riding of St. Paul's in the 1972 election. He was defeated by John Roberts in the 1974 election.

Atkey defeated Roberts in the 1979 election that brought the Tories to power under Joe Clark. Clark appointed Atkey to the Canadian Cabinet as Minister of Employment and Immigration. Clark's minority government was short-lived, however, and Atkey was defeated in the 1980 election.

During his time as Minister, Atkey was instrumental in the decision to grant 50,000 Vietnamese boat people asylum in Canada in 1979, during the Southeast Asian refugee crisis. Atkey was influenced by an early manuscript copy of the book None is Too Many, which revealed Canada's racist attitude toward Jews trying to enter Canada during the Holocaust. As a result, Canada's participation in resolving his crisis was a model for the world.

== Later life ==
After his defeat, Atkey returned to his law practice. He became a senior partner in the firm of Osler, Hoskin and Harcourt, LLP. From 1984 to 1989, he served as Chairman of the Security Intelligence Review Committee which oversees the activities of the Canadian Security Intelligence Service. He taught law at the University of Western Ontario, Osgoode Hall Law School and the University of Toronto. He wrote Canadian Constitutional Law in a Modern Perspective, which was a popular constitutional law textbook in the 1970s. In 1994, he wrote a novel, The Chancellor's Foot. He lectured on national security law and international terrorism, and was an expert on communications and cultural law. He wrote on the exemption from North American Free Trade Agreement of Canadian cultural industries.

In 2004, he was appointed Amicus Curiae to the Arar Commission in order to act as an independent counsel with the responsibility of testing government requests made on the grounds of national security confidentiality.

Atkey served as legal counsel to Warner Communications, and played a role in the company's merger with America Online.

Government offices
Preceded by New position	Chair of the Security Intelligence Review Committee (Canada); 1984–1989	Succeeded by John W. H. Bassett
