= Theo Caldwell =

Canadian, Irish and American businessman, writer and television host

Theo Caldwell is a Canadian, Irish and American businessman, writer, and former television host. Caldwell is also an investment advisor in the US and Canada, and is president of Caldwell Asset Management, one of the subsidiaries of Caldwell Financial Ltd, a company established by his father Thomas Caldwell.

== Education and career ==
Caldwell was educated at Upper Canada College (UCC), a private high school, graduating in 1991. He holds a B.A. in English from the University of Trinity College and an M.P.P. from the University of London.

In the 2000 Canadian federal election, Caldwell was the candidate for the Canadian Alliance in the Toronto riding of St. Paul's. Caldwell placed third with 5,415 votes (11.7%) behind Barry Cline, the Progressive Conservative candidate and Carolyn Bennett, the Liberal candidate who won the riding.

In 2002, Caldwell offered $150,000 in an unsuccessful bid to purchase Frank magazine hoping to change it into a "kinder and gentler" publication.

Until 2011, Caldwell was a regular columnist for the Toronto Sun and other Sun Media properties; he has also been published in the National Post. He was also a regular financial and political commentator on CTV and CTV News Channel.

In August 2008, Theo Caldwell was recognized as the Canadian Institute for Jewish Research Golden Magen Davidhonoree for outstanding person of the year, for his support of Israel in the columns of Sun Media properties and in the National Post.

He is the author of a children's book, Finn the Half-Great, published in 2009 which debuted as the top teen literature book in the country that year and was named as one of the Toronto Star's top holiday fantasy reads for children.

Caldwell currently hosts Global Command Centre a syndicated programme on international politics produced by New Light Pictures Global Media.

Caldwell returned to UCC in 2010 to serve a year as McLeese Chair in Canadian Debating.

=== Sun News Network ===
In mid-April 2011, Caldwell was named host of The Caldwell Account, a news and analysis show on Sun News Network. Caldwell was criticized for his interviewing skills, notably his fast-talking and frequent interruptions. Theo Caldwell left the network the week of June 27, 2011. Several years later, Caldwell revealed that he quit as a result of Sun failing to pay him. Caldwell's short tenure at Sun received further notice in November 2011 when Sun News reprinted a group photo from its launch in which Caldwell's image was pasted over "with a discoloured, mildly out-of-proportion image of his replacement, Toronto radio host Michael Coren."

Of Sun News Network, Caldwell wrote that "I wasn't proud of my work there. That is not to say I was not proud of my effort or that I compromised my principles; just that the finished product was lousy television, even by Canadian standards."

== Recent career ==
From 2014 until the fall of 2015, Caldwell hosted a weekly hourlong show, Saturday nights on CFRB radio, which was later cancelled. More recently, he has been a contributor to Ezra Levant's online portal, Rebel News.

== Publications ==
- Finn the Half-Great (2009)

== Electoral record - St. Paul's, Ontario ==
2000 Canadian federal election
Party	Candidate	Votes	%	±%
Liberal	Carolyn Bennett	25,110	54.3%	0.0%
Progressive Conservative	Barry Cline	10,035	21.7%	-2.0%
Alliance	Theo Caldwell	5,415	11.7%	+4.4%
New Democratic	Guy Hunter	4,372	9.7%	-2.7%
Green	Don Roebuck	759	1.6%	+0.4%
Marijuana	Andrew Potter	221	0.5%	
Canadian Action	Mark Till	125	0.3%	-0.1%
Marxist–Leninist	Barbara Seed	88	0.2%	-0.1%
Natural Law	Ron Parker	83	0.2%	-0.3%
Total valid votes		46,208	100.0%	
