= James Rooney (Canadian politician) =

Canadian politician

Member of Parliament for St. Paul's
- In office 1949–1953
- Preceded by: Douglas Ross
- Succeeded by: Roland Michener

Personal details
- Born: 1897 Cobourg, Ontario, Canada
- Died: November 24, 1969 (aged 71–72)
- Party: Liberal
- Profession: accountant

James Hendrick Rooney (1897 – November 24, 1969) was a Canadian politician. He was elected to the House of Commons of Canada as a Member of the Liberal Party in the riding of St. Paul's in the 1949 election, and served until 1953.
