= Barry Campbell =

Canadian politician (born 1950)

Member of Parliament for St. Paul's
- In office 1993–1997
- Preceded by: Barbara McDougall
- Succeeded by: Carolyn Bennett

Personal details
- Born: June 15, 1950 (age 76) Montreal, Quebec, Canada
- Party: Liberal
- Profession: Lawyer

Barry R. Campbell (born June 15, 1950) is a Canadian lawyer, lobbyist and former politician. He served in the House of Commons of Canada from 1993 to 1997 as a member of the Liberal Party of Canada.

== Life and career ==
Campbell was born in Montreal, Quebec. He received a Bachelor of Arts degree from McGill University in 1971, a Bachelor of Laws from McGill Law School in 1975, and a Master of Laws from Harvard Law School in 1977. He was an articling student and Associate with McCarthy & McCarthy from 1971 to 1981, a legal counselor for the International Monetary Fund in Washington, D.C. in 1981-82, foreign consultant with Arnold & Porter in 1982-83, and associate and partner with McCarthy & McCarthy from 1983 to 1987. He served as president of Tricaster Management Inc. from 1987 to 1990, and was a special partner with Tory, Tory, DesLauriers & Binnington from 1990 to 1993. He is a member of the Law Society of Ontario, and has done work for the Canadian Jewish Congress. Campbell has also been active in supporting AIDS research and non-profit housing in Toronto (Financial Post, 27 October 1992).

Campbell was involved with the Liberal Party for many years before running for office himself, and volunteered for Pierre Elliott Trudeau's campaign in his youth (Financial Post, 1 January 1993). He was recruited by the party leadership in 1992, and won the Liberal nomination for St. Paul's late in the year (Financial Post, 31 December 1992). Many regarded him as a "future star" for the party (Financial Post, 23 June 1992), and there was some speculation even before the 1993 election that he could be given a cabinet position (Toronto Star, 23 October 1993).

Campbell defeated star Progressive Conservative candidate Isabel Bassett by a significant margin in the election, as the Liberals won a majority government nationally. He was not appointed to cabinet by Prime Minister Jean Chrétien, and served as a government backbencher. He was named as vice-chairman of the House of Commons Finance Committee (Financial Post, 3 May 1994), co-chaired the party's 1994 national convention (Globe and Mail, 26 March 1994), and was chosen as chair of the Metro-Toronto Liberal caucus (Globe and Mail, 26 September 1994). On February 23, 1996, he was promoted to parliamentary secretary to Finance Minister Paul Martin.

In early 1997, he announced that he would not seek re-election in the next federal election (Toronto Star, 2 March 1997). There was subsequently media speculation that he would be chosen as the next president of the Liberal Party, but nothing came of this (The Globe and Mail, 13 December 1997).

Campbell became a professional lobbyist after leaving political life. His clients in 1998 included the Bank of Nova Scotia, Newcourt Capital and J.P. Morgan (Toronto Star, 30 May 1998). He also served as chair of APCO Worldwide's Canadian office and later became a senior counsellor for APCO Worldwide, as well as running his own Barry R. Campbell Strategies Inc. (Canada NewsWire, 14 March 2002).

In one of Campbell's lobbying situations, at and around the same time he was lobbying the federal Department of Finance, he was organizing a fundraising event that raised about $70,000 for then-junior federal minister of finance Jim Peterson. A decade later, in March 2009, the Federal Court of Appeal considered Rule 8 in "Democracy Watch v. Barry Campbell et al". 10 September 2013. and, making no findings against Campbell or Peterson, stated generally that, "A lobbyist's stock in trade is his or her ability to gain access to decision makers, so as to attempt to influence them directly by persuasion and facts. Where the lobbyist's effectiveness depends upon the decision maker's personal sense of obligation to the lobbyist, or on some other private interest created or facilitated by the lobbyist, the line between legitimate lobbying and illegitimate lobbying has been crossed." This ruling led to a new enforcement standard under the federal Canadian Lobbyists' Code of Conduct which prohibits lobbyists from giving things or doing things for politicians they are lobbying.

He supported John Tory's bid to become Mayor of Toronto in 2003, and was one of 29 co-chairs in the Tory campaign (Canada NewsWire, 23 March 2003). Campbell also worked as a Toronto fundraiser in Paul Martin's bid to lead the Liberal Party in 2003 (Toronto Star, 14 November 2003).

Campbell merged his lobbying firm with StrategyCorp in 2026.
