= Phil De Luna =

Canadian research scientist

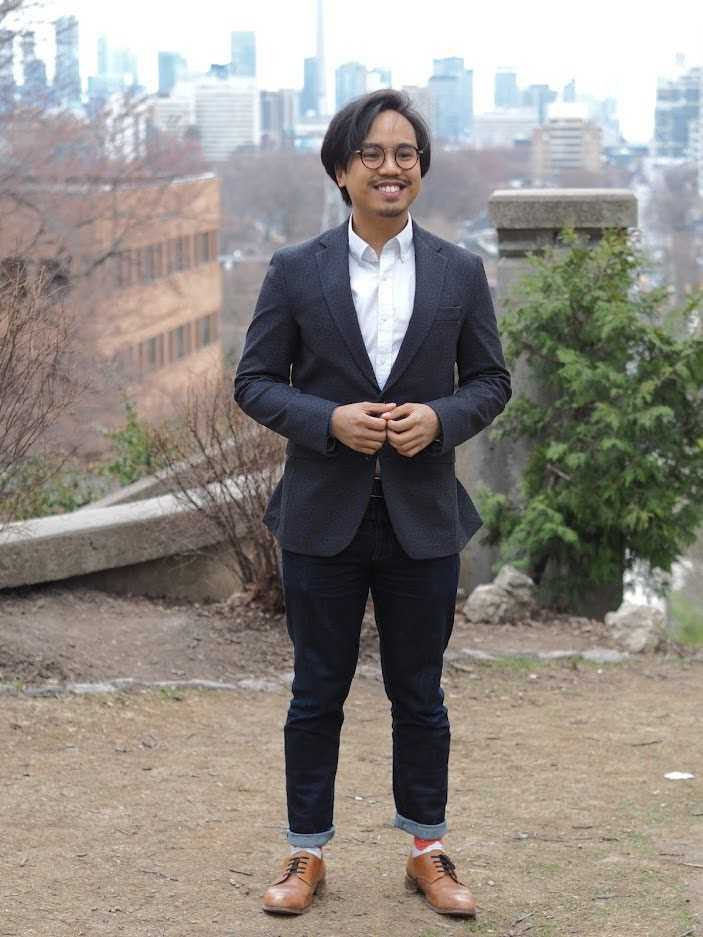
- Born: November 23, 1991 (age 34)
- Education: University of Toronto; University of Ottawa; University of Windsor
- Known for: Materials Science; Climate Science
- Awards: College Member, Royal Society of Canada; Governor General's Award; Forbes 30 Under 30
- Scientific career
- Fields: CO_{2} conversion, hydrogen, artificial intelligence
- Workplaces: National Research Council of Canada
- Thesis: Nanostructured Electrocatalysts for CO_{2} Conversion (2019)
- Website: www.phildeluna.ca

Phil De Luna is a Canadian materials scientist and chief technology officer of CURA, a decarbonized cement startup. He was formerly the chief carbon scientist and head of engineering at Deep Sky, a Canadian carbon removal project developer.

== Education and career ==
De Luna earned a B.S. degree from the University of Windsor (2013), an M.S. degree from the University of Ottawa (2015) and a Ph.D. in materials science from the University of Toronto (2018). His doctoral research identified new electrocatalytic materials for the conversion of carbon dioxide into renewable fuels and feedstocks. During this period, he worked as a research scientist at IBM T.J. Watson Research Center (2016) and Tokyo Research Institute (2018).

De Luna then began to serve as a director at the National Research Council Canada (NRC), heading the "Materials for Clean Fuels Challenge Program," a collaborative research program on Canadian-made clean energy technology (2019-2022). De Luna's research has focused on decarbonization, particularly CO_{2} conversion, hydrogen, and artificial intelligence for materials science.

In 2022, De Luna was appointed an adjunct professor in the Department of Materials Science & Engineering at the University of Toronto. He has also served at UC Berkeley as a visiting researcher. Also in 2022, De Luna published the book "Accelerated Materials Discovery: How to Use Artificial Intelligence to Speed Up Development" about using artificial intelligence and robotics to accelerate traditional experimental discovery methods for new materials development. He was a consultant for McKinsey & Company (2022-2023) before joining Deep Sky. He is a Clarivate Highly Cited Researcher. In 2025, De Luna resigned from Deep Sky, saying, "I’ve outgrown my current role, and it’s time to stretch again—to build something new I own from the ground up”.

After leaving Deep Sky, De Luna helped launched Cura, a cement decarbonization startup, as its chief technology officer. On the experience, he is quoted as saying, "I’d always viewed [Deep Sky] as a stepping stone. I knew that I wanted to be a founder. I was waiting for the right problem, the right technology, and the right team, and I found them all here in Cura".

De Luna has published extensively in Canadian media on integrating minorities into scientific research and the need for engagement between scientists and politics. He holds a variety of board and fellowship positions and has served as the board chair at Carbon Management Canada.

== Politics ==
De Luna ran for the Green Party of Canada in Toronto—St. Paul's in the 2021 Canadian federal election. He finished fourth, behind the incumbent Liberal MP Carolyn Bennett, as well as the Conservative and NDP candidates.

== Personal life ==
De Luna is of Filipino descent. He lives in Toronto with his partner, an operating room nurse at the Hospital for Sick Children.

== Electoral record ==
2021 Canadian federal election: Toronto—St. Paul's
Party	Candidate	Votes	%	±%	Expenditures
Liberal	Carolyn Bennett	26,429	49.22	-5.09	$88,807.52
Conservative	Stephanie Osadchuk	13,587	25.30	+3.69	$26,751.24
New Democratic	Sidney Coles	9,036	16.83	+1.05	$31,250.09
Green	Phil De Luna	3,214	5.99	-0.77	$30,817.63
People's	Peter Remedios	1,432	2.67	+1.12	$1,412.77
Total valid votes/expense limit		53,698	98.93	–	$112,245.61
Total rejected ballots		580	1.07	+0.43	
Turnout		54,278	65.48	-4.91	
Eligible voters		82,891			
Liberal hold		Swing		-4.39	
Source: Elections Canada

== Selected awards and recognition ==
- 2022 Globe and Mail Report on Business Changemaker
- 2021 College of New Scholars, Artists and Scientists, Royal Society of Canada
- 2019 Forbes 30 Under 30

== Selected publications ==
- De Luna, Phil (2022). De Luna, Phil (ed.). Accelerated Materials Discovery: How to Use Artificial Intelligence to Speed Up Development. De Gruyter STEM. doi:10.1515/9783110738087. ISBN 9783110738049. S2CID 247213280.
- De Luna, Phil; Hahn, Chris; et al. (26 April 2019). "What would it take for renewably powered electrosynthesis to displace petrochemical processes?". Science. 364 (6438). Bibcode:2019Sci...364.3506D. doi:10.1126/science.aav3506. hdl:1807/95195. PMID 31023896. S2CID 206667872.
- De Luna, Phil; Quintero-Bermudez, Rafael; et al. (15 January 2018). "Catalyst electro-redeposition controls morphology and oxidation state for selective carbon dioxide reduction". Nature Catalysis. 1 (2): 103–110. doi:10.1038/s41929-017-0018-9. hdl:1807/81278. OSTI 1465700. S2CID 53469664.
