= Carolyn Bennett =

Canadian politician and physician (born 1950)

Her Excellency the Honourable Carolyn Bennett PC
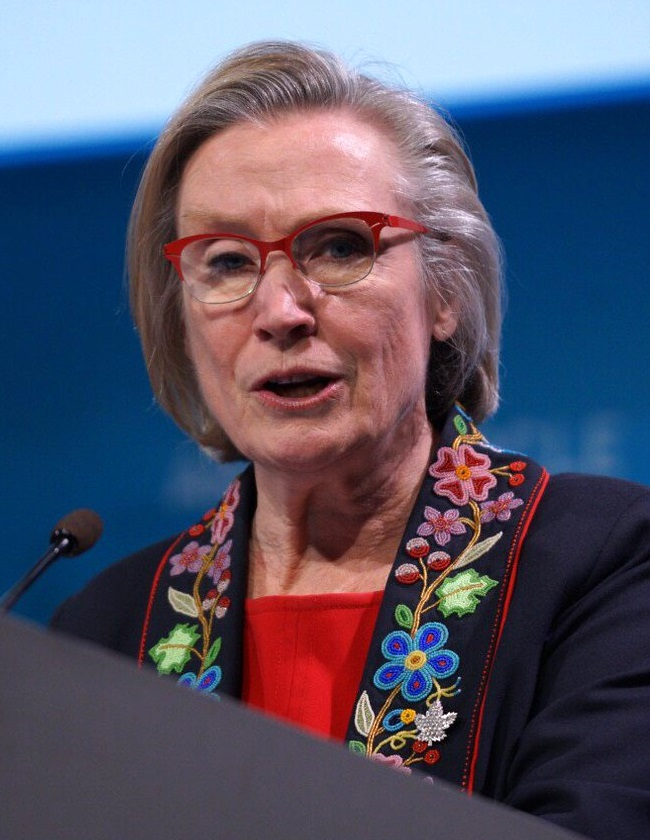
- Bennett in 2017

Ambassador of Canada to Denmark
- Incumbent
- Assumed office May 24, 2024
- Prime Minister: Justin Trudeau; Mark Carney
- Preceded by: Denis Robert

Minister of Mental Health and Addictions Associate Minister of Health
- In office October 26, 2021 – July 26, 2023
- Prime Minister: Justin Trudeau
- Preceded by: Office established
- Succeeded by: Ya'ara Saks

Minister of Crown–Indigenous Relations (Note: From 2015 to 2017, the role was known as minister of Indigenous and Northern Affairs; on August 28, 2017, the role was renamed minister of Crown–Indigenous Relations and Northern Affairs, with the newly established minister of Indigenous Services gaining some of Bennett's previous responsibilities. On July 18, 2018, the role was renamed minister of Crown–Indigenous Relations, with responsibility for Northern Affairs being given to Dominic LeBlanc.)
- In office November 4, 2015 – October 26, 2021
- Prime Minister: Justin Trudeau
- Preceded by: Bernard Valcourt
- Succeeded by: Marc Miller

Minister of State for Public Health
- In office December 12, 2003 – February 5, 2006
- Prime Minister: Paul Martin
- Preceded by: Office established
- Succeeded by: Office abolished

Member of Parliament for Toronto—St. Paul's St. Paul's (1997–2015)
- In office June 2, 1997 – January 16, 2024
- Preceded by: Barry Campbell
- Succeeded by: Don Stewart

Personal details
- Born: Carolyn Ann Bennett; December 20, 1950 (age 75) Toronto, Ontario, Canada
- Party: Liberal
- Spouse: Peter O'Brian
- Education: Havergal College
- Alma mater: University of Toronto (MD)
- Profession: Physician
- Website: www.carolynbennett.ca

Carolyn Ann Bennett PC (born December 20, 1950) is a Canadian diplomat, physician, and retired politician. A member of the Liberal Party, she represented Toronto—St. Paul's in the House of Commons from 1997 to 2024, and was a cabinet minister in the governments of Paul Martin and Justin Trudeau. She was the minister of State for Public Health from 2003 to 2006, the minister of Crown–Indigenous Relations from 2015 to 2021 and the minister of Mental Health and Addictions from 2021 to 2023. In 2024, she became the Ambassador of Canada to the Kingdom of Denmark. Prior to entering politics, Bennett worked as a family physician for 20 years.

== Early life, education and career ==
Carolyn Ann Bennett was born in Toronto on December 20, 1950. She attended Havergal College. She graduated with a degree in medicine from the University of Toronto in 1974 and received her certification in family medicine in 1976. In 2004, she was awarded an honorary fellowship from the Society of Obstetricians and Gynaecologists of Canada for her contributions to medicine, especially women's health.

=== Professional career ===
Bennett was a family physician for 20 years before entering politics.

Bennett worked as a family physician at Wellesley Hospital and Women's College Hospital in Toronto from 1977 to 1997 and was a founding partner in Bedford Medical Associates. She was also president of the medical staff association of Women's College Hospital and has a clinical adjunct appointment as an assistant professor in the department of family and community medicine at the University of Toronto. Bennett served on the boards of Havergal College, Women's College Hospital, the Ontario Medical Association, and the Medico-Legal Society of Toronto.

Bennett co-authored Kill or Cure? How Canadians Can Remake their Health Care System with Rick Archbold, published in October 2000.

== Political career ==
Bennett ran for public office in the 1995 Ontario provincial election as a candidate of the Ontario Liberal Party. Running in the riding of St. Andrew—St. Patrick, she lost to Progressive Conservative candidate Isabel Bassett by about 3,500 votes.

Bennett was more successful in the 1997 federal election, defeating her closest opponent in St. Paul's Peter Atkins by almost 15,000 votes. She was re-elected by increased margins in the elections of 2000 and 2004.

On December 12, 2003, after Paul Martin became Prime Minister, he appointed Bennett as his Minister of State for Public Health. In her two years as Minister, she set up the Public Health Agency of Canada, appointed the first chief public health officer for Canada, and established the Public Health Network.

She was chair of the Canada-Israel Friendship Group from 1999 to 2003 and is a member of Liberal Parliamentarians for Israel.

In the 2006 election, Bennett defeated two main challengers who were both touted as star candidates, Peter Kent of the Conservatives and Paul Summerville of the New Democratic Party. Bennett was re-elected, but lost her cabinet position as the Liberals were defeated. She became only the third opposition MP in the history of St. Paul's. The riding had once been a noted bellwether, but swung heavily to the Liberals along with most other central Toronto ridings.

She announced on April 24, 2006 that she would pursue the leadership of the party. On September 15, 2006, she withdrew from the leadership race and threw her support behind former Ontario Premier Bob Rae.

In the 39th Parliament, Bennett was the Official Opposition critic for social development, social economy, seniors, persons with disabilities, and public health.

She was re-elected in 2008. In the 40th Parliament, Bennett was the Official Opposition critic for health.

She was re-elected in 2011. In the 41st Parliament, Bennett was the Liberal critic for Indian Affairs and Northern Development, Aboriginal Affairs, Northern Development, and the Canadian Northern Economic Development Agency.

On November 4, 2015, Bennett was appointed the Minister of Indigenous and Northern Affairs, which was later renamed the position of Minister of Crown-Indigenous Relations. In May 2016, regarding the Declaration on the Rights of Indigenous Peoples, which Canada voted against in 2007, Bennett stated that "we intend nothing less than to adopt and implement the Declaration". She was re-elected in 2019.

On June 24, 2021, Bennett was forced to apologize to Jody Wilson-Raybould for her response to a tweet by Wilson-Raybould concerning Justin Trudeau and his government's response to the discovery of hundreds of unmarked graves at Marieval Indian Residential School in Saskatchewan. Referencing her tweet, Bennett texted Wilson-Raybould the single-word message "Pension?". Wilson-Raybould called it "racist and misogynistic", posting a screenshot of the message on Twitter.

On October 26, 2021, Bennett was sworn in as Canada's first ever Minister of Mental Health and Addictions, with Marc Miller taking her place as Minister for Crown-Indigenous Relations.

On July 24, 2023, Bennett announced she would not be running in the next general election, and in the Cabinet shuffle two days later, she was demoted from her position as Minister of Mental Health and Addictions. She resigned her seat on January 16, 2024, the same day it was reported she would be appointed Canada's Ambassador to Denmark. The federal by-election to replace her was held on June 24, 2024. She was succeeded by Conservative Party candidate Don Stewart.

== Personal life ==
She is married to Canadian film producer Peter O'Brian. They have two sons.

== Awards ==
- Royal Life Saving Society Service Cross (1986)
- EVE Award for Contributing to the Advancement of Women in Politics (2002)
- CAMIMH Mental Health Champion Award (2003)
- Federation of Medical Women of Canada May Cohen Award (2006)
- W. Victor Johnston Award for Lifetime Contribution to Family Medicine in Canada and Internationally (2009)
- National Award of Excellence for Outstanding Leadership and Dedication to Injury Prevention and Safety

== Electoral record ==
=== Toronto—St. Paul's, 2015–2023 ===
2021 Canadian federal election: Toronto—St. Paul's
Party	Candidate	Votes	%	±%	Expenditures
Liberal	Carolyn Bennett	26,429	49.22	-5.09	$88,807.52
Conservative	Stephanie Osadchuk	13,587	25.30	+3.69	$26,751.24
New Democratic	Sidney Coles	9,036	16.83	+1.05	$31,250.09
Green	Phil De Luna	3,214	5.99	-0.77	$30,817.63
People's	Peter Remedios	1,432	2.67	+1.12	$1,412.77
Total valid votes/expense limit		53,698	98.93	–	$112,245.61
Total rejected ballots		580	1.07	+0.43	
Turnout		54,278	65.48	-4.91	
Eligible voters		82,891			
Liberal hold		Swing		-4.39	
Source: Elections Canada

2019 Canadian federal election: Toronto—St. Paul's
Party	Candidate	Votes	%	±%	Expenditures
Liberal	Carolyn Bennett	32,494	54.31	-0.95	$88,263.67
Conservative	Jae Truesdell	12,933	21.61	-5.37	$95,161.27
New Democratic	Alok Mukherjee	9,442	15.78	+1.06	$48,947.09
Green	Sarah Climenhaga	4,042	6.76	+3.72	$447.10
People's	John Kellen	923	1.54	-	$0.00
Total valid votes/expense limit		59,834	99.04		
Total rejected ballots		384	0.64	+0.20	
Turnout		60,218	70.39	-2.15	
Eligible voters		85,544			
Liberal hold		Swing		+2.21	
Source: Elections Canada

2015 Canadian federal election: Toronto—St. Paul's
Party	Candidate	Votes	%	±%	Expenditures
Liberal	Carolyn Bennett	31,481	55.26	+15.34	–
Conservative	Marnie MacDougall	15,376	26.99	-5.43	–
New Democratic	Noah Richler	8,386	14.72	-7.91	–
Green	Kevin Farmer	1,729	3.03	-1.45	–
Total valid votes/Expense limit		56,972	100.0		$208,833.75
Total rejected ballots		252	–	–	
Turnout		57,224	–	–	
Eligible voters		77,433			
Source: Elections Canada

=== St. Paul's, 1997-2015 ===
2011 Canadian federal election: St. Paul's
Party	Candidate	Votes	%	±%	Expenditures
Liberal	Carolyn Bennett	22,409	40.6	-9.9	
Conservative	Maureen Harquail	17,864	32.4	+5.8	
New Democratic	William Molls	12,124	22.0	+8.7	
Green	Jim McGarva	2,495	4.5	-4.6	
Libertarian	John Kittredge	303	0.5	-0.1	
Total valid votes/Expense limit		55,195	100.0		
Total rejected ballots		276	0.5	–	
Turnout		55,471	68.2	–	
Eligible voters		81,288	–	–	

2008 Canadian federal election: St. Paul's
Party	Candidate	Votes	%	±%	Expenditures
Liberal	Carolyn Bennett	26,326	50.5	+0.2	$69,331
Conservative	Heather Jewell	13,800	26.6	+0.8	$53,617
New Democratic	Anita Agrawal	6,880	13.3	-5.9	$13,606
Green	Justin Erdman	4,713	9.1	+4.3	$3,526
Libertarian	John Kittredge	313	0.6	–	$182
Total valid votes/Expense limit		52,032	100.0	$86,488	

2006 Canadian federal election: St. Paul's
Party	Candidate	Votes	%	±%
Liberal	Carolyn Bennett	29,295	50.3	-8.1
Conservative	Peter Kent	15,021	25.8	+5.4
New Democratic	Paul Summerville	11,189	19.2	+3.5
Green	Kevin Farmer	2,785	4.8	-0.7
Total valid votes		58,290	100.0	

2004 Canadian federal election: St. Paul's
Party	Candidate	Votes	%	±%
Liberal	Carolyn Bennett	32,171	58.4	+4.1
Conservative	Barry Cline	11,226	20.4	-13.1*
New Democratic	Norman Tobias	8,667	15.7	+6.3
Green	Peter Elgie	3,031	5.5	+3.9
Total valid votes		55,095	100.0	

*Comparison to total of Progressive Conservative and Canadian Alliance vote in 2000.

2000 Canadian federal election: St. Paul's
Party	Candidate	Votes	%	±%
Liberal	Carolyn Bennett	25,110	54.3	0.0
Progressive Conservative	Barry Cline	10,035	21.7	-2.0
Alliance	Theo Caldwell	5,415	11.7	+4.4
New Democratic	Guy Hunter	4,372	9.7	-2.7
Green	Don Roebuck	759	1.6	+0.4
Marijuana	Andrew Potter	221	0.5	
Canadian Action	Mark Till	125	0.3	-0.1
Marxist–Leninist	Barbara Seed	88	0.2	-0.1
Natural Law	Ron Parker	83	0.2	-0.3
Total valid votes		46,208	100.0	

Note: Canadian Alliance vote is compared to the Reform vote in 1997 election.

1997 Canadian federal election: St. Paul's
Party	Candidate	Votes	%	±%
Liberal	Carolyn Bennett	26,389	54.3	-0.1
Progressive Conservative	Peter Atkins	11,520	23.7	-0.7
New Democratic	Michael Halewood	6,028	12.4	+7.3
Reform	Francis Floszmann	3,564	7.3	-3.8
Green	Don Roebuck	597	1.2	+0.3
Natural Law	Neil Dickie	221	0.5	-0.2
Canadian Action	Daniel Widdicombe	182	0.4	
Marxist–Leninist	Fernand Deschamps	135	0.3	+0.1
Total valid votes		48,636	100.0	

=== Provincial ===
St. Andrew—St. Patrick: 1995 Ontario general election
Party	Candidate	Votes	Vote %
Progressive Conservative	Isabel Bassett	13,092	40.4
Liberal	Carolyn Bennett	9,413	29.1
New Democratic	David Jacobs	9,231	28.5
Green	Hamish Wilson	271	0.8
Natural Law	Bruce Hislop	237	0.7
Libertarian	Mark Scott	141	0.4
	Total	32,385	

== Notes ==
29th Canadian Ministry (2015–2025) – Cabinet of Justin Trudeau
Cabinet post (1)
Predecessor	Office	Successor
Bernard Valcourt	Minister of Crown Indigenous Relations; November 4, 2015 – October 26, 2021	Marc Miller
27th Canadian Ministry (2003–2006) – Cabinet of Paul Martin
Cabinet post (1)
Predecessor	Office	Successor
	Minister of State (Public Health); 2003–2006	
