= John Carmichael (Canadian politician) =

Canadian politician

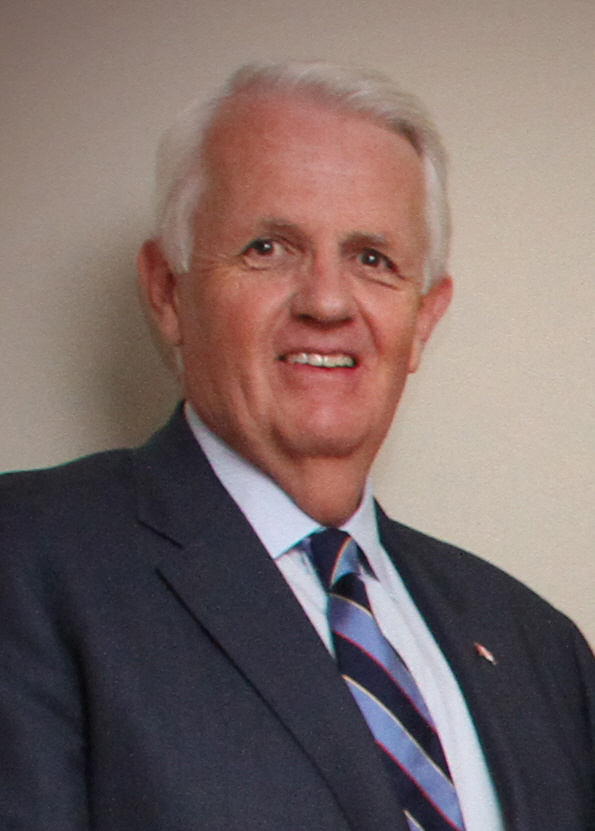
- Carmichael in 2012

Member of the Canadian Parliament for Don Valley West
- In office May 2, 2011 – August 4, 2015
- Preceded by: Rob Oliphant
- Succeeded by: Rob Oliphant

Personal details
- Born: February 14, 1952 (age 74) Toronto, Ontario, Canada
- Party: Conservative
- Spouse: Kerry
- Children: 3 including Christin
- Profession: Businessman

John Carmichael (born February 14, 1952) is a former Canadian politician. He was a Conservative member of the House of Commons of Canada from 2011 to 2015 who represented the Toronto riding of Don Valley West.

== Background ==
Carmichael was born in Toronto. He owned and operated City Buick Pontiac Cadillac GMC Ltd. He and his wife Kerry raised three children. His daughter Christin Carmichael Greb was City Councillor for Ward 16 Eglinton—Lawrence, serving till October 2018. She was defeated by former MPP Mike Colle.

== Politics ==
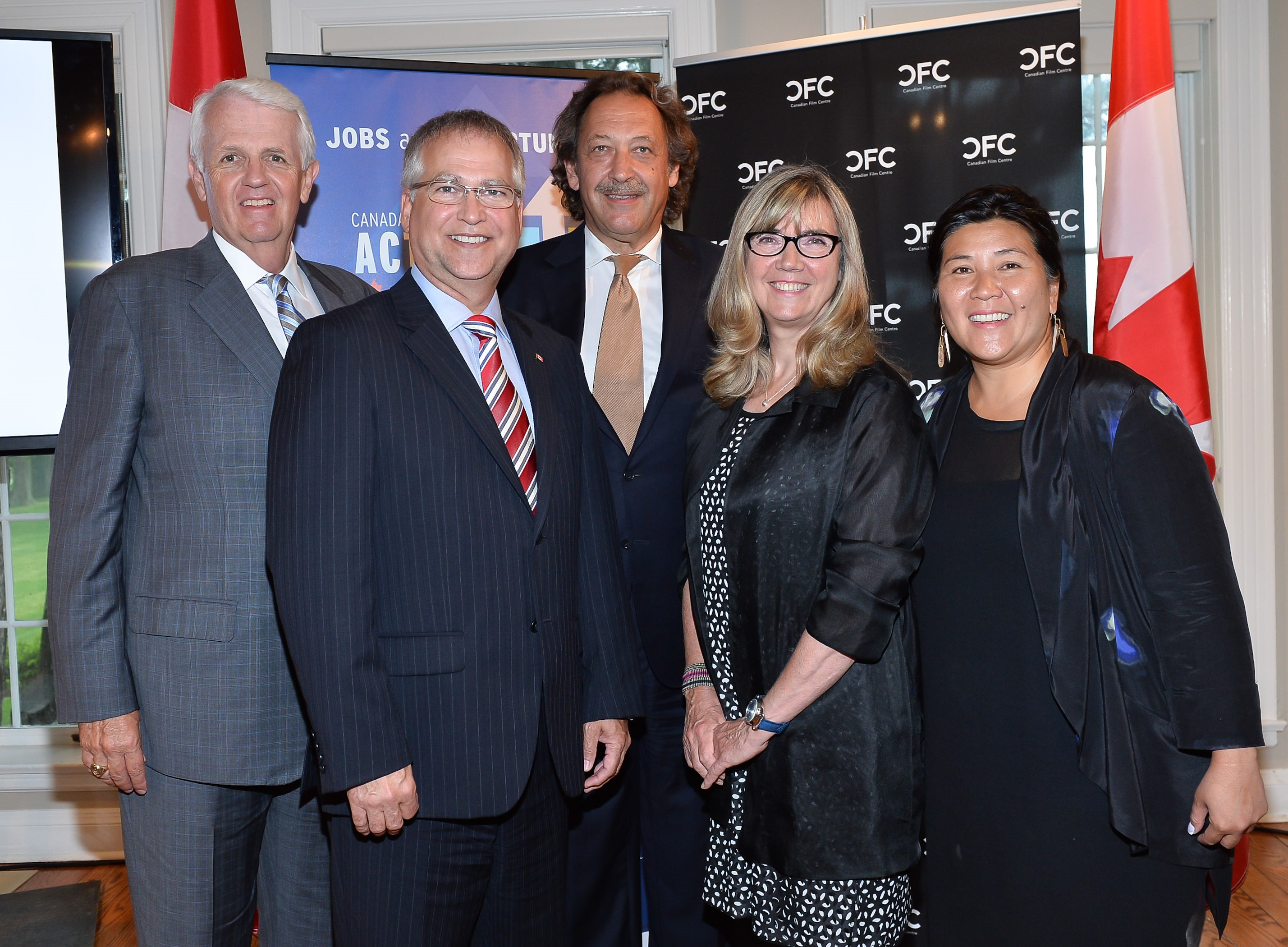
John Carmichael, MP; Gary Goodyear, Minister of State; Slawko Klykiw; Christina Jennings, Chair, CFC Board of Directors; Ana Serrano @ Canadian Film Centre

Carmichael ran as the Conservative party candidate in the riding of Don Valley West in 2006 and 2008 federal elections, losing both times to Liberals John Godfrey and Rob Oliphant. In the 2011 election, he defeated incumbent Oliphant by 611 votes. He served as a backbench member of the Stephen Harper government.

In 2011, he sponsored a private member's bill called National Flag of Canada Act that provided protections for anyone who wants to fly the flag of Canada. The new law makes it illegal for anyone to prevent someone else from flying the flag. Penalties range from fines to up to two years in jail. Critics called the bill an excuse to enshrine patriotism in law.

In 2015, he was defeated by Oliphant in a rematch of the 2011 election.

=== Electoral record ===
2015 Canadian federal election
Party	Candidate	Votes	%	±%	Expenditures
Liberal	Rob Oliphant	27,472	53.78	+12.29	–
Conservative	John Carmichael	19,206	37.6	-5.33	–
New Democratic	Syeda Riaz	3,076	6.02	-4.73	–
Green	Natalie Hunt	848	1.66	-1.91	–
Libertarian	John Kittredge	325	0.64	–	–
Communist	Elizabeth Hill	84	0.16	-0.19	–
Independent	Sharon Cromwell	75	0.15	–	–
Total valid votes/Expense limit		51,086	100.0	-4.48	$202,821.40
Total rejected ballots		217	0.4	+0.07	
Turnout		51,303	72.75	+5.91	
Eligible voters		70,524	–	-12.15	
Source: Elections Canada

2011 Canadian federal election
Party	Candidate	Votes	%	±%	Expenditures
Conservative	John Carmichael	22,962	42.93	+4.11	–
Liberal	Rob Oliphant	22,351	41.79	-2.57	–
New Democratic	Nicole Yovanoff	6,280	11.74	+1.55	–
Green	Georgina Wilcock	1,703	3.18	-3.12	–
Communist	Dimitris Kabitsis	186	0.35	+0.02	–
Total valid votes		53,482	100.00	–	
Total rejected ballots		176	0.33	–	
Turnout		53,658	66.84	–	
Eligible voters		80,276	–	–	

2008 Canadian federal election
Party	Candidate	Votes	%	±%	Expenditures
Liberal	Rob Oliphant	22,212	44.36	-9.2	$60,129
Conservative	John Carmichael	19,441	38.83	+5.6	$82,633
New Democratic	David Sparrow	5,102	10.19	+1.1	$67,984
Green	Georgina Wilcock	3,155	6.30	+2.8	$10,725
Communist	Catherine Holliday	162	0.32	–	
Total valid votes/Expense limit		50,072	100.00	$85,470	
Total rejected ballots		–			
Turnout		–	62.8		

2006 Canadian federal election
Party	Candidate	Votes	%	±%
Liberal	John Godfrey	28,709	53.4	-6.4
Conservative	John Carmichael	17,908	33.3	+5.0
New Democratic	David Thomas	4,902	9.1	+0.5
Green	Daphne So	1,906	3.5	+0.2
Libertarian	Soumen Deb	226	0.4	
Canadian Action	Paul Barnes	151	0.3	
Total valid votes		53,802	100.0	
