= Eglinton—Lawrence =

Eglinton—Lawrence may refer to:

- Eglinton—Lawrence (federal electoral district), federal riding in Toronto, Ontario, Canada
- Eglinton—Lawrence (provincial electoral district), provincial riding in Toronto, Ontario, Canada
- Ward 8 Eglinton—Lawrence, municipal ward in Toronto, Ontario, Canada
