= Josh Colle =

Canadian politician (born 1972/3)

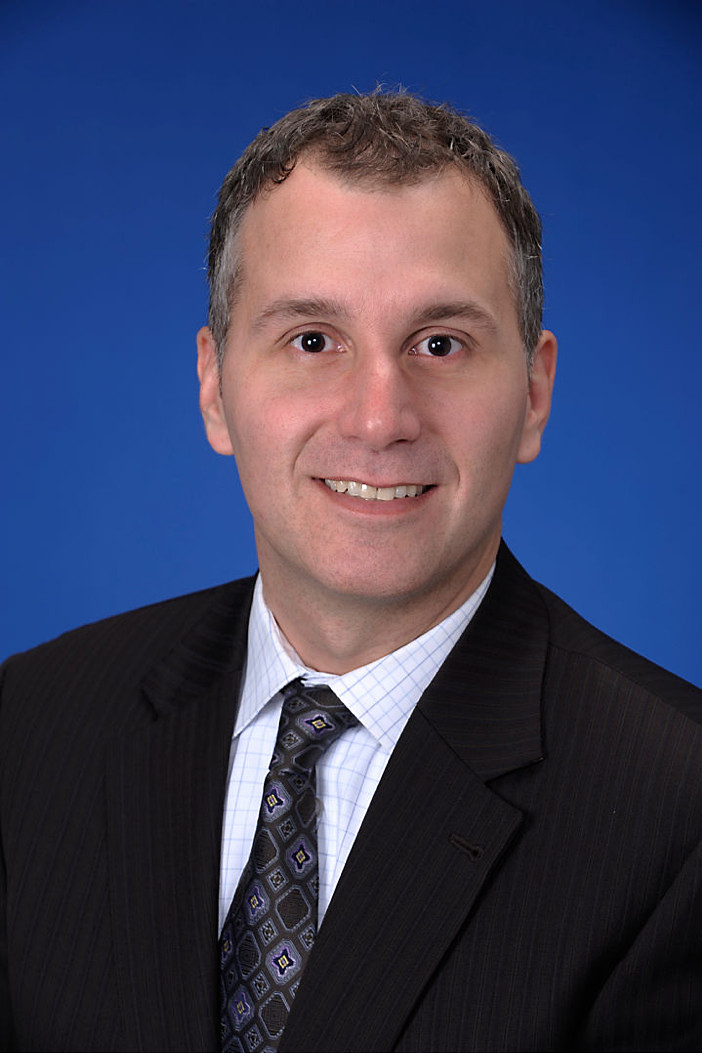
- Colle in 2010

Toronto City Councillor for (Ward 15) Eglinton—Lawrence
- In office December 1, 2010 – December 1, 2018
- Preceded by: Howard Moscoe
- Succeeded by: Mike Colle (Ward 8)

Chair of the Toronto Transit Commission
- In office December 1, 2014 – December 13, 2018
- Preceded by: Karen Stintz
- Succeeded by: Jaye Robinson

Chair of the Planning and Growth Management Committee
- In office August 7, 2014 – November 30, 2014
- Preceded by: Peter Milczyn
- Succeeded by: David Shiner

Personal details
- Born: 1972 or 1973 (age 53–54)
- Children: 3
- Parent: Mike Colle (father)
- Occupation: Energy and Infrastructure Executive

Josh Colle (born 1972 or 1973) is a Canadian politician. He was the councillor for Ward 15 on Toronto City Council for the years 2010-2018. Colle was the Chair of the Toronto Transit Commission during the period 2014-2018.

== Politics ==
As city councillor, Colle served as a director on many high-profile city agency boards, including the board of Toronto Hydro. In March 2012, he was elected by Toronto City Council to serve as a commissioner of the Toronto Transit Commission and was subsequently made chair in December, 2014.

He was instrumental in petitioning Metrolinx to include a station at Oakwood Avenue in their final plans for the Eglinton Crosstown line. It was confirmed that the Crosstown would feature a station at Oakwood in October 2012.

In 2018, a month after registering as a candidate in the 2018 municipal election, Colle withdrew his registration and announced his retirement from politics. His father Mike Colle subsequently announced his candidacy for councillor in the 2018 municipal election and ran in the new enlarged Ward 8 Eglinton Lawrence, comprising the former Ward 15 held by his son and Ward 16 represented by Christin Carmichael Greb. Mike Colle defeated Greb in Ward 16.

== Post-political career ==
Effective July 15, 2024, Colle started work as Chief Strategy and Customer Service Officer at the Toronto Transit Commission. For several years, Colle had worked at various transit agencies in Canada and the United States.

== Election results ==
2014 Toronto election, Ward 15
Candidate	Votes	%
Josh Colle	14,733	75.20%
Chani Aryeh-Bain	2,410	12.30%
Ahmed Belkadi	1,382	7.05%
Eduardo Harari	645	3.29%
James Van Zandwijk	422	2.15%
Total	19,592	100%

2010 Toronto election, Ward 15
Candidate	Votes	%
Josh Colle	6,668	40.375%
Rob Davis	5,399	32.691%
Ron Singer	2,275	13.775%
Tony Evangelista	1,173	7.103%
Giuseppe Pede	472	2.858%
Eva Tavares	464	2.81%
William Reitsma	64	0.388%
Total	16,515	100%

== See also ==
- Lorenzo Berardinetti - first cousin once removed
