= Rob Oliphant =

Canadian politician

The Reverend and Honourable Robert Oliphant PC MP
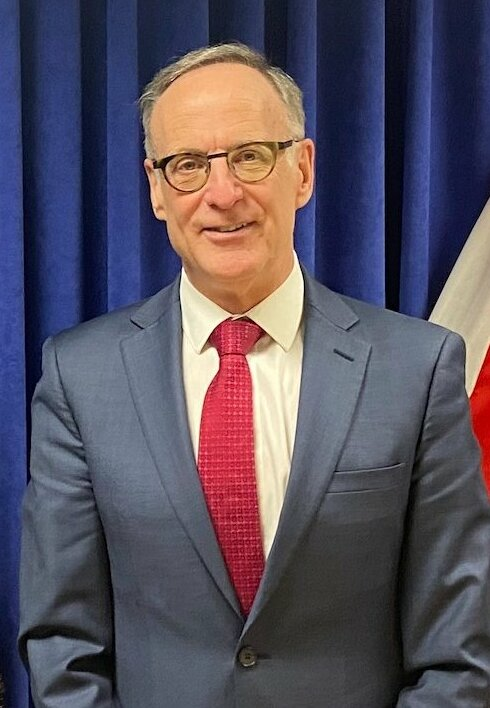
- Oliphant in 2023

Parliamentary Secretary to the Minister of Foreign Affairs
- Incumbent
- Assumed office May 3, 2019 Serving with Mona Fortier (2025-present)
- Minister: Chrystia Freeland; Francois-Philippe Champagne; Marc Garneau; Mélanie Joly; Anita Anand
- Preceded by: Andrew Leslie

Chairman of the Standing Committee on Citizenship and Immigration
- In office February 4, 2016 – May 9, 2019
- Preceded by: Daryl Kramp
- Succeeded by: Salma Zahid

Member of Parliament for Don Valley West
- Incumbent
- Assumed office October 19, 2015
- Preceded by: John Carmichael
- In office October 14, 2008 – May 2, 2011
- Preceded by: John Godfrey
- Succeeded by: John Carmichael

Personal details
- Born: June 7, 1956 (age 70) Sault Ste. Marie, Ontario, Canada
- Party: Liberal
- Spouse: Marco A. Fiola
- Education: University of Toronto (BCom); University of British Columbia (MDiv); Chicago Theological Seminary (DMin)
- Profession: United Church minister and health charity executive

Robert B. Oliphant PC MP (born June 7, 1956) is a Canadian politician and a United Church minister. He serves in the House of Commons as a Liberal Member of Parliament for the Toronto riding of Don Valley West. First elected from 2008 to 2011, he returned to the office from 2015 to present.

Oliphant currently holds the office of Parliamentary Secretary to the Minister of Foreign Affairs Anita Anand, a role he also served under Anand's four predecessors.

== Personal life ==
Born and raised in Sault Ste. Marie, Oliphant studied commerce and art at the University of Toronto, graduating in 1978, with a Bachelor of Commerce. While at university he rowed on the men's varsity rowing crew, and was involved in music and student politics.

Oliphant lives in Sherwood Park, Toronto with his husband, Marco A. Fiola, the principal of York University - Glendon Campus.

== Church career ==
Upon graduating from the University of Toronto, Oliphant returned to Sault Ste. Marie and worked at Algoma Steel as an accountant in computer systems development. He remained in Sault Ste. Marie for two years before entering the Vancouver School of Theology at the University of British Columbia. He was sponsored as a candidate for ministry by his home church, Central United Church in Sault Ste. Marie. After completing his Master of Divinity studies at UBC, Oliphant was ordained as a United Church minister in 1984. He has been stationed in diverse communities such as Montreal, Toronto, Quyon, Quebec, Newfoundland and Whitehorse.

Between 1999 and 2008, Oliphant was a member of the Team Ministry at Eglinton St. George's United Church in Toronto, one of the largest congregations in the United Church of Canada. In 2004, he was given an award for 18 years of continuous work in interfaith dialogue.

On May 17, 2008, Oliphant obtained his Doctorate of Ministry (D.Min.) from the Chicago Theological Seminary.

Oliphant served as the president and CEO of the Asthma Society of Canada from 2011 to 2015, before being re-elected to the House of Commons as the representative for Don Valley West in the 2015 federal election.

== Political involvement prior to election ==
Oliphant worked as a senior advisor in the Ontario government. In 1989, he was asked by then-Premier David Peterson to work in a senior role in the Premier's office. He subsequently went on to serve as Executive Assistant and Chief of Staff to two ministers, Mavis Wilson, Ontario Minister Responsible for Women's Issues, and Christine Hart, Ontario Minister of Culture and Communications.

Oliphant has worked on many campaigns at both the federal and provincial levels and has held official positions in the party. He was an active young Liberal serving as President of the University of Toronto Liberal Club, Chair of "Youth for Peterson", and served on the Executive of the Ontario New (Young) Liberals. In anticipation of a federal election in 1978, Oliphant was part of a group of young Liberals who trained in tour operations for Prime Minister Pierre Trudeau. He has worked in campaigns in Sault Ste. Marie, for candidates including Alex Sinclair and Ron Irwin, in Toronto, for Margaret Campbell, Roy MacLaren, Carolyn Bennett, Allan Rock and several others, and in Yukon, for former Council of Yukon First Nations Grand Chief Shirley Adamson. During the 2006 federal leadership race, Oliphant was an advisor to Michael Ignatieff's campaign.

In December 2006, columnist Michael Valpy mentioned Oliphant's name as a possible contender for the federal Liberal nomination for Toronto Centre should Bill Graham decide not to seek re-election. It was subsequently reported in January 2007 that Oliphant was hosting exploratory meetings in the riding. However, Oliphant did not pursue this bid, deferring to former NDP Premier Bob Rae who became the Liberal candidate in this riding.

In January 2008, Oliphant sought the federal Liberal nomination of Don Valley West after John Godfrey announced his retirement. Others interested in the nomination included former Liberal MP Sarmite Bulte, prominent constitutional expert Deborah Coyne, local imam Abdul Ingar, and Jonathan Mousley. During the nomination process, Coyne accused Oliphant and Bulte supporters of signing up members who hadn't paid a membership fee, a violation of party rules. Members of the press contacted several people who had signed up as members who confirmed they had not paid a fee. Oliphant replied that he had instructed his campaign team to follow the rules.

On February 25, 2008, Coyne withdrew from the nomination race and endorsed Oliphant. On March 2, 2008, he won the nomination in the fourth round of voting to become the Liberal party candidate in the federal by-election. The by-election had been called for September 22, 2008, but this was cancelled in the wake of the general election called for October 14, 2008.

== Member of Parliament ==
Oliphant was elected to the House of Commons on October 14, 2008.

He was named to the Shadow Cabinet by Stéphane Dion as Critic for Veterans Affairs in November 2008. He was appointed to the same post by Michael Ignatieff in October 2009. On September 7, 2010, in announcing the team of Opposition Critics, Liberal Leader Michael Ignatieff named Oliphant to the Multiculturalism post.

He served as the co-chair of the Canada-India Parliamentary Friendship Group, treasurer-secretary of the Canada-Pakistan Parliamentary Friendship Group and vice-chair of the All-Party Arts Caucus, the Liberal Caucus' Intergovernmental Affairs Liaison with Queen's Park on Ontario Issues, and the Federal Caucus Liaison of the Ontario Young Liberals.

In the 2011 election, Oliphant was defeated by the Conservative candidate John Carmichael. Four years later, he reclaimed the riding, defeating Carmichael in a rematch.

Oliphant was elected to the House of Commons on October 19, 2015, representing the federal riding of Don Valley West.

In May 2016, Rob rose in the House of Commons to co-sponsor Bill C-233, an Act respecting a national strategy for Alzheimer's disease and other dementias, at second reading. The bill legislated the creation of a National Alzheimer's and other Dementias Strategy. The Liberal government put $50 million over 10 years towards the strategy to fund awareness, research, and care and support for patients, families and caregivers all living with the challenges of dementia.

In March 2017, Oliphant successfully sponsored and revived a previous Senate Private Member's Bill (PMB) initiated by former Senator Jim Cowan known as (S-201) which sought to implement national penalties against genetic discrimination. This novel PMB was not supported by the government but passed successfully during its third reading due to Liberal backbenchers voting against Justice Minister Jody Wilson-Raybould's suggested amendments, which would have limited the scope of the bill.

On May 3, 2019, Oliphant was appointed as the Parliamentary Secretary to the Minister of Foreign Affairs by Prime Minister Justin Trudeau. He had previously served as the Chair of the Standing Committee on Citizenship and Immigration. Oliphant then worked closely with the Honourable Marc Garneau, Minister of Foreign Affairs. Rob is also Co-Chair of the Canada-Africa Parliamentary Association and the Canada-Pakistan Friendship Group. He served as Co-Chair of the House of Commons and Senate Special Joint Committee on Physician-Assisted Dying and as Chair of the Standing Committee on Public Safety and National Security from 2015 to 2017.

He was re-elected in the 2019 federal election and has been serving as the Parliamentary Secretary to the Minister of Foreign Affairs since May 3, 2019. Oliphant was sworn in as a member of the Privy Council on December 3, 2021.

== Electoral record ==
2025 Canadian federal election: Don Valley West
Party	Candidate	Votes	%	±%	Expenditures
Liberal	Rob Oliphant	36,744	62.6	+5.40	
Conservative	Robert Pierce	19,480	33.2	+3.30	
New Democratic	Linnea Löfström-Abary	1,382	2.4	–6.80	
Green	Sheena Sharp	616	1.1	–0.01	
Independent	Bahira Abdulsalam	442	0.8	N/A	
Total valid votes/expense limit		58,664	99.2	—	
Total rejected ballots		479	0.8	—	
Turnout		59,143	68.8	+2.5	
Eligible voters		85,928			
Liberal hold		Swing		+1.05	
Source: Elections Canada

2021 Canadian federal election: Don Valley West
Party	Candidate	Votes	%	±%	Expenditures
Liberal	Rob Oliphant	24,798	52.7	-3.1	$98,666.75
Conservative	Yvonne Robertson	16,695	35.5	+4.3	$93,591.10
New Democratic	Syeda Riaz	3,814	8.1	+0.8	$26.24
People's	Michael Minas	881	1.9	+1.0	$1,582.23
Green	Elvira Caputolan	761	1.6	-2.7	$0.00
Centrist	Adil Khan	65	0.1	N/A	$5,233.16
Total valid votes/expense limit		47,014	99.2	–	$107,129.06
Total rejected ballots		363	0.8		
Turnout		47,377	66.3		
Eligible voters		71,465			
Liberal hold		Swing		-3.7	
Source: Elections Canada

2019 Canadian federal election: Don Valley West
Party	Candidate	Votes	%	±%	Expenditures
Liberal	Rob Oliphant	29,148	55.8	+2.02	$97,454.94
Conservative	Yvonne Robertson	16,304	31.2	-6.40	$98,556.64
New Democratic	Laurel MacDowell	3,804	7.3	+1.28	$0.00
Green	Amanda Kistindey	2,257	4.3	+2.64	$0.98
People's	Ian Prittie	444	0.9	-	$3,650.11
Libertarian	John Kittredge	277	0.5	-0.14	$0.00
Total valid votes/expense limit		52,234	100.0		
Total rejected ballots		422			
Turnout		52,656	71.5		
Eligible voters		73,652			
Liberal hold		Swing		+4.21	
Source: Elections Canada

2015 Canadian federal election
Party	Candidate	Votes	%	±%	Expenditures
Liberal	Rob Oliphant	27,472	53.78	+12.29	–
Conservative	John Carmichael	19,206	37.6	-5.33	–
New Democratic	Syeda Riaz	3,076	6.02	-4.73	–
Green	Natalie Hunt	848	1.66	-1.91	–
Libertarian	John Kittredge	325	0.64	–	–
Communist	Elizabeth Hill	84	0.16	-0.19	–
Independent	Sharon Cromwell	75	0.15	–	–
Total valid votes/Expense limit		51,086	100.0	-4.48	$202,821.40
Total rejected ballots		217	0.4	+0.07	
Turnout		51,303	72.75	+5.91	
Eligible voters		70,524	–	-12.15	
Liberal gain from Conservative		Swing		+8.81	
Source: Elections Canada

2011 Canadian federal election
Party	Candidate	Votes	%	±%	Expenditures
Conservative	John Carmichael	22,962	42.93	+4.11	–
Liberal	Rob Oliphant	22,351	41.79	-2.57	–
New Democratic	Nicole Yovanoff	6,280	11.74	+1.55	–
Green	Georgina Wilcock	1,703	3.18	-3.12	–
Communist	Dimitris Kabitsis	186	0.35	+0.02	–
Total valid votes		53,482	100.00	–	
Total rejected ballots		176	0.33	–	
Turnout		53,658	66.84	–	
Eligible voters		80,276	–	–	
Conservative gain from Liberal		Swing		+3.34	

2008 Canadian federal election
Party	Candidate	Votes	%	±%	Expenditures
Liberal	Rob Oliphant	22,212	44.36	-9.2	$60,129
Conservative	John Carmichael	19,441	38.83	+5.6	$82,633
New Democratic	David Sparrow	5,102	10.19	+1.1	$67,984
Green	Georgina Wilcock	3,155	6.30	+2.8	$10,725
Communist	Catherine Holliday	162	0.32	–	
Total valid votes/Expense limit		50,072	100.00	$85,470	
Total rejected ballots		–			
Turnout		–	62.8		
Liberal hold		Swing		-7.4	

== See also ==
- Clan Oliphant, a Highland Scottish clan
- United Church of Canada
- Liberal Party of Canada
- Asthma Society of Canada
