= Vince Gasparro =

Canadian politician

Vince Gasparro MP
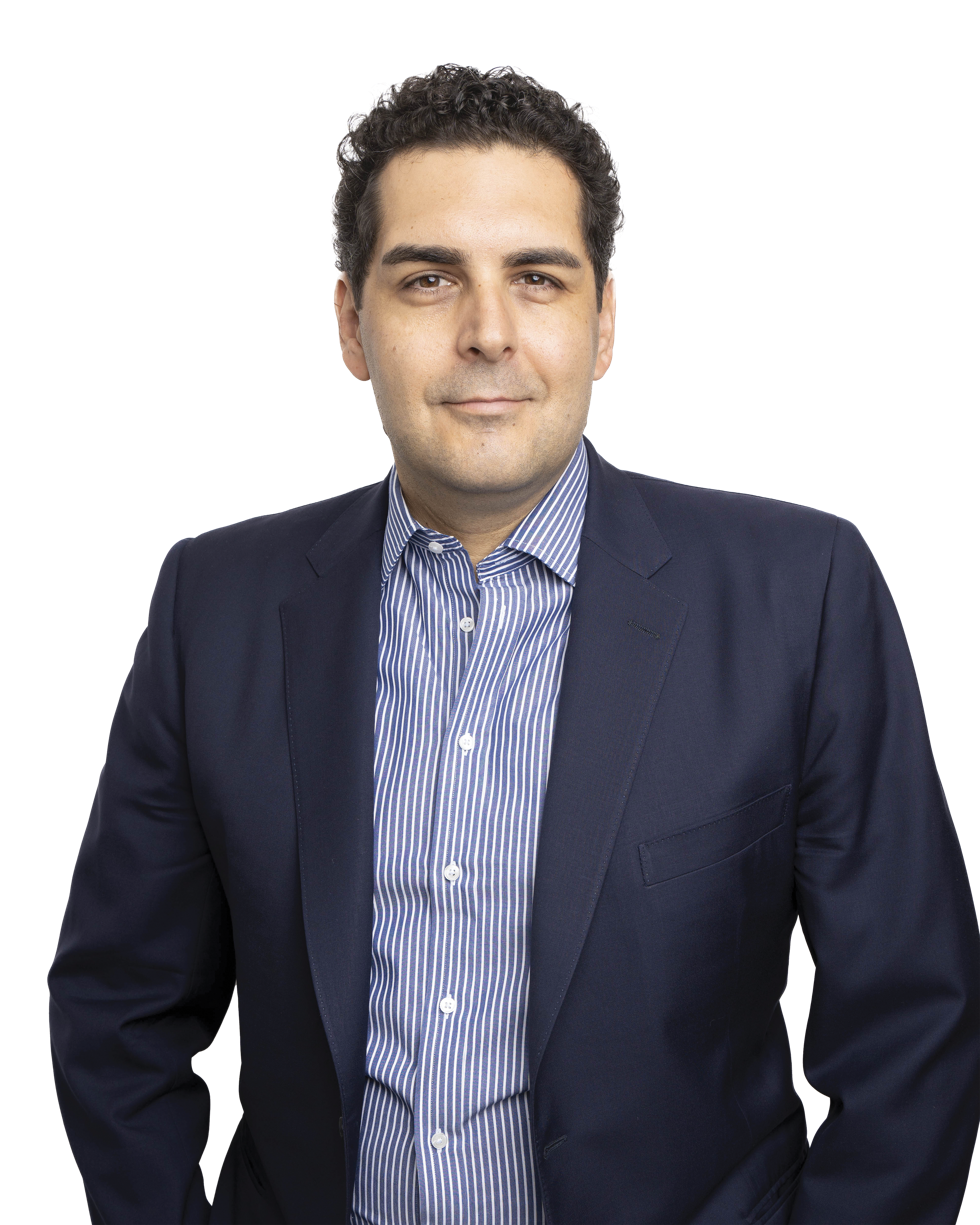

Parliamentary Secretary to the Secretary of State (Combatting Crime)
- Incumbent
- Assumed office June 5, 2025

Member of Parliament for Eglinton—Lawrence
- Incumbent
- Assumed office April 28, 2025
- Preceded by: Marco Mendicino

Personal details
- Born: North York, Ontario
- Party: Liberal (federal); Ontario Liberal (provincial)
- Education: York University (BA) London School of Economics (MSc) Villanova University (MBA)
- Occupation: Politician, Banker
- Website: vincegasparro.ca

Vince Gasparro MP is a Canadian politician, and former finance executive. A member of the Liberal Party of Canada, he has been serving as the Member of Parliament for Eglinton—Lawrence since the 2025 Canadian federal election.

== Background ==
=== Early career ===
Gasparro served as a special assistant in the Office of the Prime Minister of Canada for Paul Martin and as principal secretary in the Office of the Mayor of Toronto for John Tory.

Gasparro worked in private equity, working in acquisitions for Lynx Equity Limited from 2006 to 2018.

In addition, he held executive roles at Scotiabank's Roynat Capital, Vancity, AgriRoots Private Credit Fund. and the Six Nations of the Grand River Development Corporation holding roles in sustainable and clean energy finance. He has financed large institutional clean energy infrastructure projects across Canada and the United States.

Gasparro has also served on the board of directors for several organizations, including Postmedia Network where he was the liberal voice at the table to ensure balance. He also served on the boards of the Canada Infrastructure Bank, WWF Canada and Toronto Community Housing.

In 2006, Gasparro founded the non-profit Project Engagement: a not-for-profit seeking to alleviate short-term poverty while looking for solutions for those stuck in a cycle of longer-term poverty. Providing meals and toys for children were some of the initiatives and one year the organization collected 40,000 kilograms of food for distribution. Gasparro was recognized for his efforts and was awarded the Ontario Medal for Good Citizenship in 2010 by the Government of Ontario. It is the second highest honour that can be awarded to a citizen in that province.

Gasparro was a member of Canada's official delegation to the United Nations Climate Change Conferences during COP26, COP27 and COP28.

=== Career in elected politics ===
After an experience involving the healthcare system and his daughter, Gasparro was encouraged to run for political office having witnessed what he described as the 'total chaos' of the healthcare system under Doug Ford.

Gasparro was the Ontario Liberal candidate for Eglinton—Lawrence in the 2025 Ontario general election, Gasparro outperformed the Ontario Liberal Party's provincial result by 19% but came up short to Progressive Conservative candidate Michelle Cooper by 167 votes.

He ran again in Eglinton—Lawrence, this time federally, succeeding Marco Mendocino who had resigned to become Chief of Staff to the Prime Minister. Gasparro defeated star Conservative candidate and former Toronto city councillor and TTC chair Karen Stintz. Several media outlets described the race as one to watch. Following the federal election, Gasparro's name was among those mentioned in the National Post for possible cabinet suggestions given his strong financial background combined with his successful political experience.

On June 5, 2025, Prime Minister Mark Carney appointed Gasparro as the Parliamentary Secretary to the Secretary of State (Combatting Crime).

In September 2025, he declined to be candidate in the next Ontario Liberal Party leadership election.

On 19 September 2025, Gasparro released a video on social media announcing that the Canadian government had decided to ban Kneecap from entering the country, citing alleged support for designated terrorist groups and to protect Canada's Jewish community. Kneecap said that it had not received any official notice from the Government of Canada and was also considering legal action against Gasparro. Initially, no relevant government department, official, or minister confirmed that there was a ban, while some theorized that Gasparro had acted without consulting public safety minister Gary Anandasangaree. In the first week of October, the Conservative Party and New Democratic Party, both in opposition, called for clarity on the issue and an investigation into whether Gasparro lied.

In November, reporting by the Canadian Broadcasting Corporation confirmed that Immigration, Refugees and Citizenship Canada (IRCC) had cancelled the eTA of one member, Mo Chara, in August due to “inadmissibility for omitting to disclose complete and accurate information on his application.” IRCC had also informed the other two members not to travel to Canada until receiving further communication.

== Personal life ==
He is Italian-Canadian and is married to Nicola Meyer. He has two daughters. At the time of the 2025 Canadian federal election, he lived in North York, Ontario.

He attended Brebeuf College School in Willowdale, Ontario. He holds a Bachelor of Arts (BA) in Political Science from York University, a Master of Business Administration (MBA) from the Villanova School of Business and a Master of Science (MSc) in Political Economy from the London School of Economics.

On September 6, 2025, Gasparro was granted an honorary knighthood by the Supreme Commander of the Knights of Rizal, a Filipino organization dedicated to propagating the values of Dr. Jose Rizal.

== Electoral record ==
2025 Canadian federal election: Eglinton—Lawrence
Party	Candidate	Votes	%	±%	Expenditures
Liberal	Vince Gasparro	29,949	49.3	+0.7	
Conservative	Karen Stintz	29,061	47.8	+11.4	
New Democratic	Allison Tanzola	996	1.6	–7.6	
Green	Wayne Chechuevskiy	429	0.7	–2.3	
People's	Timothy Gleeson	326	0.5	–2.4	
Total valid votes/expense limit		60,761	99.4	+0.4	
Total rejected ballots		416	0.6	-0.4	
Turnout		61,117	70.9	+9.1	
Eligible voters		86,150			
Liberal hold		Swing		–5.30	
Source: Elections Canada

2025 Ontario general election: Eglinton—Lawrence
Party	Candidate	Votes	%	±%
Progressive Conservative	Michelle Cooper	19,556	48.48	+6.19
Liberal	Vince Gasparro	19,389	48.07	+7.11
Green	Leah Tysoe	1,390	3.45	–0.41
Total valid votes		40,335	99.23	
Total rejected, unmarked and declined ballots		311	0.77	+0.19
Turnout		40,646	46.73	+0.00
Eligible voters		86,989		
Progressive Conservative hold		Swing		–0.46
Source: Elections Ontario
