= John Bosley (politician) =

Canadian politician (1947–2022)

The Honourable John Bosley PC
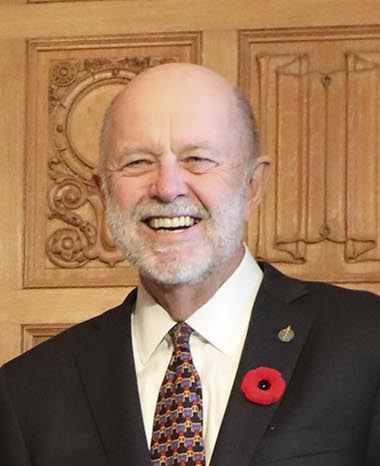
- Bosley in 2017

31st Speaker of the House of Commons
- In office November 5, 1984 – September 29, 1986
- Preceded by: Lloyd Francis
- Succeeded by: John Fraser

Member of Parliament for Don Valley West
- In office 1979–1993
- Preceded by: Riding established
- Succeeded by: John Godfrey

Personal details
- Born: John William Bosley; May 4, 1947 Toronto, Ontario, Canada
- Died: April 28, 2022 (aged 74) Toronto, Ontario, Canada
- Party: Progressive Conservative
- Education: Trinity College, Toronto (BA)
- Profession: Businessman

John William Bosley PC (May 4, 1947 – April 28, 2022) was a Canadian politician. He was best known for having been speaker of the House of Commons from November 5, 1984 to September 29, 1986.

== Biography ==
Bosley received a BA in 1968 from Trinity College in the University of Toronto. Prior to his election to Parliament, he was a businessman. A member of the Progressive Conservative Party of Canada, he was first elected in the 1979 election in the riding of Don Valley West in Toronto. He served as Parliamentary Secretary to Prime Minister Joe Clark.

He was re-elected in the 1980 and 1984 elections. After the 1984 election, he was named Speaker of the House of Commons.

On June 27, 1985, the House adopted changes to the Standing Orders, providing for the election of the Speaker by secret ballot. Bosley presided over the first such election on September 30, 1986, after tendering his resignation. John Fraser won that election to become the 32nd Speaker of the House of Commons.

Bosley was re-elected as a Member of Parliament (MP) in the 1988 election. He ran against incumbent John Fraser in the second election for Speaker but was unsuccessful.

He was defeated in the 1993 general election in which the Progressive Conservative Party was reduced from 157 MPs to two.

Starting in 1993, Bosley served as Advisor on Institutional Development to Parliaments all over the world but primarily in sub-Saharan Africa.

In 2002, Bosley received the Queen Elizabeth II Golden Jubilee Medal and in 2012 the Queen Elizabeth II Diamond Jubilee Medal.

He died from heart failure in Toronto on April 28, 2022, at the age of 74.
