= Robin Martin =

Canadian politician

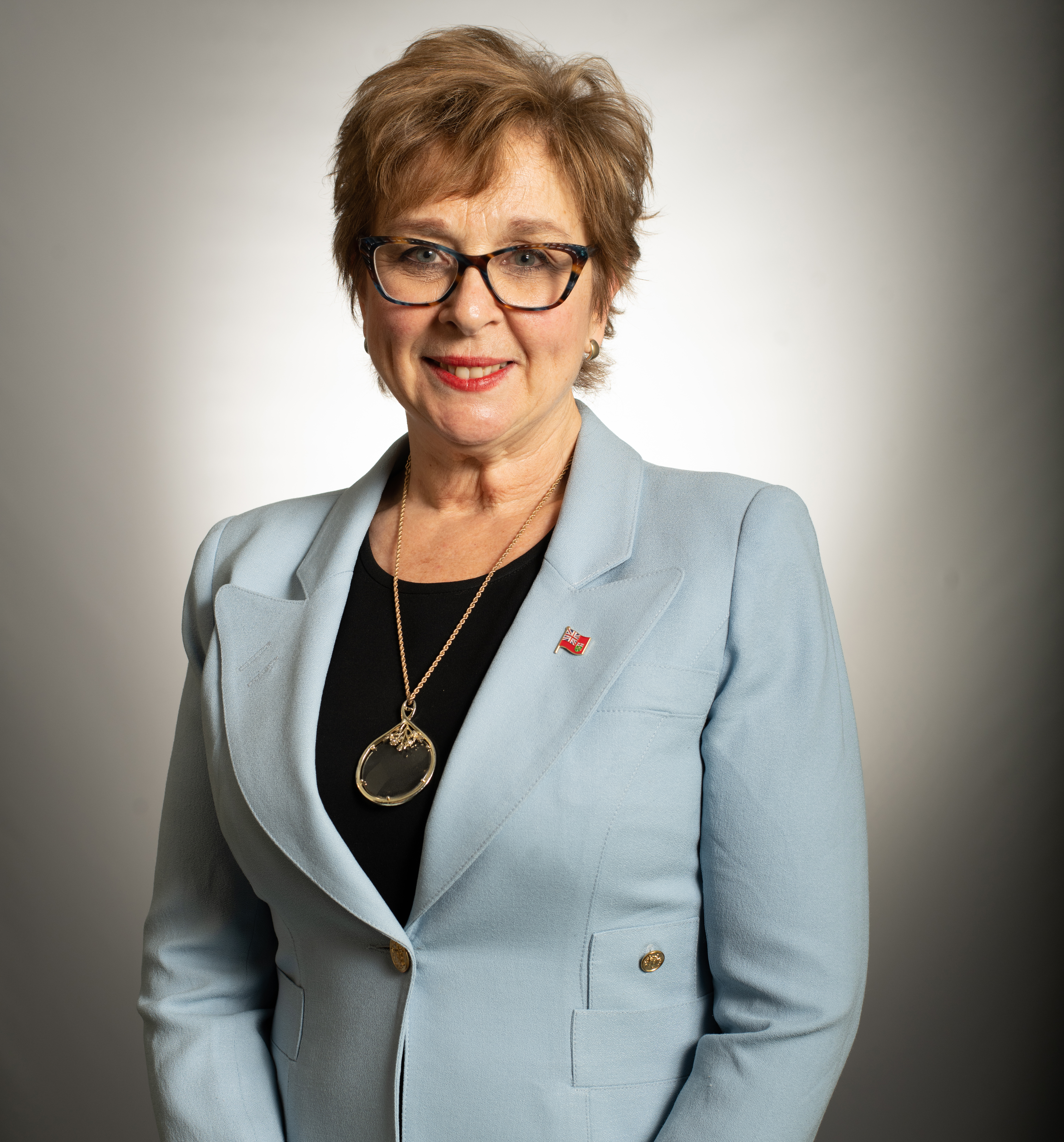

Member of the Ontario Provincial Parliament for Eglinton—Lawrence
- In office June 7, 2018 – February 27, 2025
- Preceded by: Michael Colle
- Succeeded by: Michelle Cooper

Parliamentary Assistant to the Minister of Health
- In office June 26, 2019 – February 27, 2025
- Minister: Christine Elliott; Sylvia Jones

Parliamentary Assistant to the Minister of Health and Long-Term Care (Health)
- In office June 29, 2018 – June 26, 2019
- Minister: Christine Elliott

Personal details
- Party: Progressive Conservative Party of Ontario
- Education: McGill University (BA, MA); Sciences Po; University of Toronto (JD)
- Occupation: Lawyer

Robin Lynn Martin is a Canadian politician, who was elected to the Legislative Assembly of Ontario in the 2018 provincial election and remained in office until 2025. She represented the riding of Eglinton—Lawrence as a member of the Progressive Conservative Party of Ontario. Martin ran in Eglinton-Lawrence in 2014 but lost to incumbent Liberal Mike Colle. She defeated Colle in a re-match in 2018. Prior to being elected into the Ontario Legislature, Martin practiced litigation for over a decade at Osler and Lenczner

== Early life ==
Robin Martin was born in Saskatoon, Saskatchewan to Gord and Ruth. She was the second of two children. In 1989, Robin married her high-school sweetheart Jon Martin. They had two children in 1993 and 1995. Martin holds a joint Honours undergraduate degree in Political Science and History from McGill University in Montreal. Upon graduation, she received Guy F. Drummond scholarship for one year to attend L'Institut d’etudes politiques de Paris in France. After her return, she received a Masters Degree from McGill University in Political Theory. She studied with renowned Canadian philosopher Charles Taylor. In 1991, Robin graduated with a law degree from the University of Toronto.

== Prior to Election ==
In 1993, Martin was called to the bar and practiced law for over 10 years specializing in litigation. She then worked as a policy advisor within Ontario's Ministry of Health. Following the defeat of the then-Conservative government, Martin went on to work at StrategyCorp.

== Political career ==
In June 2018, Martin was elected as a member of provincial parliament defeating long-time incumbent Mike Colle. She was sworn in as Parliamentary Assistant to the Minister of Health and Long-Term Care (Health) on June 29, 2018 and reappointed as Parliamentary Assistant to the Minister of Health on June 26, 2019.

In November 2019, MPP Martin introduced her first Private Members' Bill, the Defibrillator Registration and Public Access Act. The act received unanimous support from across party lines at Second and Third readings, and is estimated to save 1,500 people annually by increasing access to defibrillators.

In response to financial pressures on local businesses within Martin's riding of Eglinton-Lawrence during the COVID-19 pandemic, Martin proposed property tax reforms in March 2020 to help businesses stay solvent. These measures would later be incorporated into, and passed as part of the Ontario government's 2020 budget. In November of the same year, Martin proposed a motion requiring school boards across Ontario to adopt an anti-human trafficking protocol, which passed unanimously and was later adopted by the Ministry of Education.

Martin has been a strong advocate for the Jewish community within Eglinton-Lawrence since her election to the provincial legislature. In 2020, Martin joined Brantford-Brant MPP Will Bouma in co-sponsoring Bill 168, officially known as the Combating Antisemitism Act. The act called for the Ontario government to formally adopt the International Holocaust Remembrance Alliance definition of antisemitism. During April 2021, Martin proposed a motion which would establish a Holocaust memorial on the grounds of the Legislative Assembly of Ontario. The motion passed with unanimous consent.

== Electoral record ==
2022 Ontario general election: Eglinton—Lawrence
Party	Candidate	Votes	%	±%	Expenditures
Progressive Conservative	Robin Martin	16,605	42.30	+1.92	$98,735
Liberal	Arlena Hebert	16,081	40.96	+2.51	$69,052
New Democratic	Natasha Doyle-Merrick	3,801	9.68	–8.46	$14,134
Green	Leah Tysoe	1,513	3.85	+1.45	$2,551
New Blue	Erwin E. Sniedzins	393	1.00	–	$369
Ontario Party	Lauren Dearing	268	0.68	–	$0
Independent	Sam Kaplun	216	0.55	–	$2,676
Special Needs	Derek Sharp	166	0.42	–	$0
Public Benefit	Jonathan Davis	117	0.30	–	$0
None of the Above	Bryant Thompson	98	0.25	–	$0
Total valid votes		39,258	99.43	–	$118,318
Total rejected, unmarked and declined ballots		227	0.57	–0.39	
Turnout		39,485	46.72	–13.39	
Eligible voters		84,513			
Progressive Conservative hold		Swing		–0.30	
Source: Elections Ontario

2018 Ontario general election: Eglinton—Lawrence
Party	Candidate	Votes	%	±%
Progressive Conservative	Robin Martin	19,999	40.38	+6.62
Liberal	Michael Colle	19,042	38.45	–16.35
New Democratic	Robyn Vilde	8,985	18.14	+10.80
Green	Reuben Anthony Deboer	1,190	2.40	–0.73
Libertarian	Michael Staffieri	211	0.43	–
Trillium	Lionel Wayne Poizner	100	0.20	–
Total valid votes		49,527	99.03	
Total rejected, unmarked and declined ballots		484	0.97	+0.08
Turnout		50,011	60.11	+6.12
Eligible voters		83,202		
Progressive Conservative gain from Liberal		Swing		+11.49
Source: Elections Ontario

2014 Ontario general election
Party	Candidate	Votes	%	±%
Liberal	Mike Colle	22,855	54.80	+0.65
Progressive Conservative	Robin Martin	14,079	33.76	+0.21
New Democratic	Thomas Gallezot	3,060	7.34	-2.48
Green	Lucas C. McCann	1,305	3.13	+1.63
Freedom	Michael Bone	264	0.63	+0.23
Independent	Erwin Sniedzins	143	0.34	–
Total valid votes		41,706	100.0	
Liberal hold		Swing		+0.22
Source: Elections Ontario
