= Christin Carmichael Greb =

Canadian politician

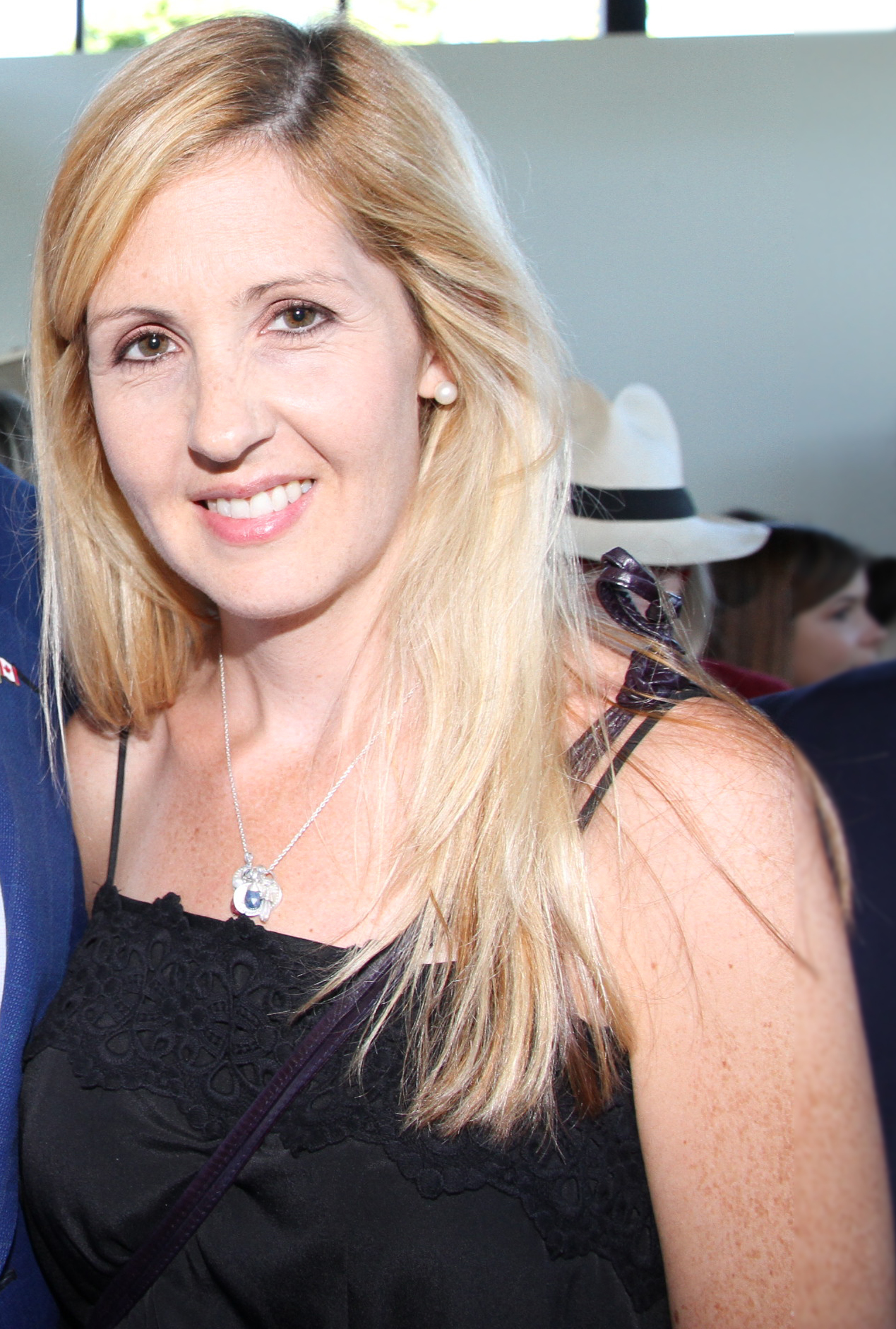
- Carmichael Greb in 2014

Toronto City Councillor for Ward 16 Eglinton—Lawrence
- In office December 1, 2014 – December 1, 2018
- Preceded by: Karen Stintz
- Succeeded by: Mike Colle

Personal details
- Born: Toronto, Ontario, Canada
- Parent: John Carmichael (father)
- Occupation: Business analyst, Bombardier Aerospace

Christin Carmichael Greb is an active board member, Canadian realtor and former politician who represented Ward 16 Eglinton—Lawrence on Toronto City Council from 2014 to 2018.

== Background ==
She is the daughter of former Don Valley West Member of Parliament John Carmichael. Prior to entering politics, she was involved in the automotive industry and as a business analyst at Bombardier Aerospace.

== Political career ==
Carmichael Greb was elected following the 2014 municipal election.

In 2018, she introduced a motion to lift the city's ban on street hockey, following residents' complaints of by-law notices about hockey and basketball nets blocking roads and an open letter to the city from Ontario Minister of Children and Youth Services Michael Coteau. The motion passed 35–2 .

Carmichael Greb ran for Toronto City Council again in 2018, but finished second behind Michael Colle.

== Municipal electoral record ==
2018 Toronto election, Ward 8
Candidate	Votes	%
Colle Mike	14,094	41.34%
Carmichael Greb Christin	7,395	21.69%
Youssefi Dyanoosh	5,253	15.41%
Levy Beth	3,122	9.16%
Arp Jennifer	2,404	7.05%
Johnston Lauralyn	992	2.91%
Pede Josh	420	1.23%
Dunlop Darren	210	0.62%
Pancer Randall	134	0.39%
Tijiri Peter	72	0.21%
Total	34,096	100%

2014 Toronto election, Ward 16
Candidate	Votes	%
Christin Carmichael Greb	3,949	17.38
Adam Tanel	3,680	16.20
Dyanoosh Youssefi	3,145	13.84
Jean-Pierre Boutros	2,428	10.69
Terry Mills	1,763	7.76
Steven Levitan	1,723	7.58
Michael Coll	1,609	7.08
Sean Conacher	1,309	5.76
Elana Metter	1,245	5.48
Gary Heaney	626	2.75
Charm Darby	578	2.54
Bob Williams	287	1.26
John Cannella	121	0.53
Thomas Gallezot	97	0.43
Paul Spence	93	0.41
Peter Vukosavljev	70	0.31
Total	22,723	100%
