= Michelle Cooper (politician) =

Canadian politician from Ontario

The Honourable Michelle Cooper ECO MPP
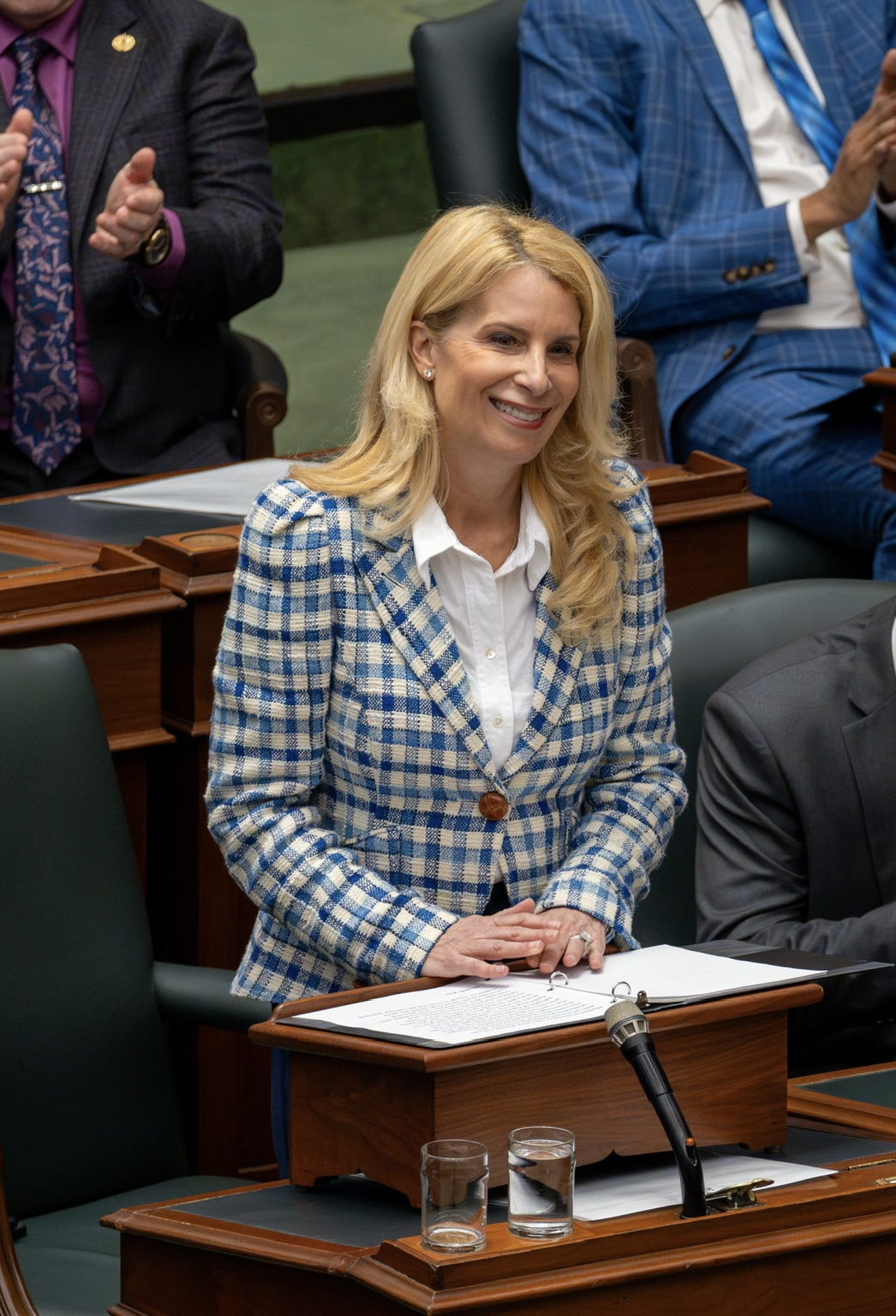

Associate Minister of Mental Health and Addictions
- Incumbent
- Assumed office September 10, 2026
- Premier: Doug Ford
- Preceded by: Vijay Thanigasalam

Member of the Ontario Provincial Parliament for Eglinton—Lawrence
- Incumbent
- Assumed office February 27, 2025
- Preceded by: Robin Martin

Personal details
- Party: Progressive Conservative

Michelle Cooper is a Canadian politician serving as the Member of Provincial Parliament (MPP) for Eglinton-Lawrence since February 27, 2025. She is a member of the Progressive Conservative Party of Ontario. She was appointed Associate Minister of Mental Health and Addictions in Doug Ford's cabinet on September 10, 2026.

== Early life and education ==
Cooper has a master's degree in political science.

== Career ==
Cooper was an early pioneer in Canada's internet startup market. Prior to her election, Cooper was executive director of the PC Ontario Fund. She also led fundraising efforts for Premier Doug Ford and the Ontario PC Party. She was an early pioneer in Canada's internet startup space.

She currently serves as Parliamentary Assistant to the Minister of Finance and is a member of the Standing Committee on Public Accounts.

== Electoral record ==
2025 Ontario general election: Eglinton—Lawrence
Party	Candidate	Votes	%	±%
Progressive Conservative	Michelle Cooper	19,556	48.48	+6.18
Liberal	Vince Gasparro	19,389	48.07	+7.11
Green	Leah Tysoe	1,390	3.45	–0.40
Total valid votes/expense limit		40,335	99.23	–0.20
Total rejected, unmarked, and declined ballots		311	0.77	+0.20
Turnout		40,646	46.89	–0.17
Eligible voters		86,676		
Progressive Conservative hold		Swing		–0.47
Source: Elections Ontario
