= Eglinton—Lawrence (provincial electoral district) =

Provincial electoral district in Ontario, Canada

Coordinates: 43.7175°N 79.4483°W

Ontario electoral district
- Location in Toronto

Provincial electoral district
- Legislature: Legislative Assembly of Ontario
MPP
Michelle Cooper
Progressive Conservative
- District created: 1999
- First contested: 1999
- Last contested: 2025

Demographics
- Population (2016): 114,400
- Electors (2018): 83,202
- Area (km²): 23
- Pop. density (per km²): 4,973.9
- Census division: Toronto
- Census subdivision: Toronto

Eglinton—Lawrence is a provincial electoral district in Toronto, Ontario, Canada. It elects one member to the Legislative Assembly of Ontario.

It was created in 1999 from parts of Lawrence, York Mills, Wilson Heights, Oakwood, St. Andrew—St. Patrick and Eglinton.

When the riding was created, it included all of Metro Toronto within the following line: Highway 401 to the CN Railway to Eglinton Avenue to Dufferin Street to Rogers Road to Oakwood Avenue to Holland Park Avenue to Winona Drive to the border of Old Toronto to Bathurst Street to the Belt Line to Eglinton Avenue to Yonge Street.

In 2007, the southern border was altered so that it was Eglinton Avenue from the CN Railway to Yonge Street.

== Members of Provincial Parliament ==
Eglinton—Lawrence
Assembly	Years	Member	Party
Riding created from Lawrence, York Mills, Wilson Heights, Oakwood, St. Andrew—St. Patrick and Eglinton
37th	1999–2003	Mike Colle	Liberal
38th	2003–2007	Mike Colle	Liberal
39th	2007–2011	Mike Colle	Liberal
40th	2011–2014	Mike Colle	Liberal
41st	2014–2018	Mike Colle	Liberal
42nd	2018–2022	Robin Martin	Progressive Conservative
43rd	2022–2025	Robin Martin	Progressive Conservative
44th	2025–present	Michelle Cooper	Progressive Conservative
Sourced from the Ontario Legislative Assembly

== Election results ==
Winning party in each polling division of Eglinton—Lawrence riding at the 2025 Ontario general election

2025 Ontario general election
Party	Candidate	Votes	%	±%
Progressive Conservative	Michelle Cooper	19,556	48.48	+6.19
Liberal	Vince Gasparro	19,389	48.07	+7.11
Green	Leah Tysoe	1,390	3.45	–0.41
Total valid votes		40,335	99.23	
Total rejected, unmarked and declined ballots		311	0.77	+0.19
Turnout		40,646	46.73	+0.00
Eligible voters		86,989		
Progressive Conservative hold		Swing		–0.46
Source: Elections Ontario

Winning party in each polling division of Eglinton—Lawrence at the 2022 Ontario general election

2022 Ontario general election
Party	Candidate	Votes	%	±%	Expenditures
Progressive Conservative	Robin Martin	16,605	42.30	+1.92	$98,735
Liberal	Arlena Hebert	16,081	40.96	+2.51	$69,052
New Democratic	Natasha Doyle-Merrick	3,801	9.68	–8.46	$14,134
Green	Leah Tysoe	1,513	3.85	+1.45	$2,551
New Blue	Erwin E. Sniedzins	393	1.00	–	$369
Ontario Party	Lauren Dearing	268	0.68	–	$0
Independent	Sam Kaplun	216	0.55	–	$2,676
Special Needs	Derek Sharp	166	0.42	–	$0
Public Benefit	Jonathan Davis	117	0.30	–	$0
None of the Above	Bryant Thompson	98	0.25	–	$0
Total valid votes		39,258	99.43	–	$118,318
Total rejected, unmarked and declined ballots		227	0.57	–0.39	
Turnout		39,485	46.72	–13.39	
Eligible voters		84,513			
Progressive Conservative hold		Swing		–0.30	
Source: Elections Ontario

2018 Ontario general election
Party	Candidate	Votes	%	±%
Progressive Conservative	Robin Martin	19,999	40.38	+6.62
Liberal	Michael Colle	19,042	38.45	–16.35
New Democratic	Robyn Vilde	8,985	18.14	+10.80
Green	Reuben Anthony Deboer	1,190	2.40	–0.73
Libertarian	Michael Staffieri	211	0.43	–
Trillium	Lionel Wayne Poizner	100	0.20	–
Total valid votes		49,527	99.03	
Total rejected, unmarked and declined ballots		484	0.97	+0.08
Turnout		50,011	60.11	+6.12
Eligible voters		83,202		
Progressive Conservative gain from Liberal		Swing		+11.49
Source: Elections Ontario

2014 Ontario general election
Party	Candidate	Votes	%	±%
Liberal	Michael Colle	22,855	54.80	+0.65
Progressive Conservative	Robin Martin	14,079	33.76	+0.21
New Democratic	Thomas Gallezot	3,060	7.34	–2.48
Green	Lucas C. McCann	1,305	3.13	+1.63
Freedom	Michael Bone	264	0.63	+0.24
Independent	Erwin Sniedzins	143	0.34	–
Total valid votes		41,706	99.11	
Total rejected, unmarked and declined ballots		374	0.89	+0.44
Turnout		42,080	53.99	+2.18
Eligible voters		77,946		
Liberal hold		Swing		+0.22
Source: Elections Ontario

2011 Ontario general election
Party	Candidate	Votes	%	±%
Liberal	Michael Colle	20,752	54.15	+10.92
Progressive Conservative	Rocco Rossi	12,857	33.55	–4.35
New Democratic	Gerti Dervishi	3,763	9.82	–0.22
Green	Josh Rachlis	575	1.50	–5.63
Freedom	Michael Bone	152	0.40	+0.07
Independent	Jerry Green	146	0.38	–
Independent	Sujith Kumar Reddy	79	0.21	–
Total valid votes		38,324	99.55	
Total rejected, unmarked and declined ballots		172	0.45	–0.58
Turnout		38,496	51.81	–3.82
Eligible voters		74,309		
Liberal hold		Swing		+7.64
Source: Elections Ontario

2007 Ontario general election
Party	Candidate	Votes	%	±%
Liberal	Michael Colle	17,402	43.23	–13.66
Progressive Conservative	Bernie Tanz	15,257	37.90	+8.18
New Democratic	Karin Wiens	4,039	10.03	–0.39
Green	Andrew James	2,871	7.13	+4.17
Libertarian	Tom Gelmon	235	0.58	–
Family Coalition	Rina Morra	229	0.57	–
Freedom	Franz Cauchi	130	0.32	–
Independent	Joseph Young	90	0.22	–
Total valid votes		40,253	98.97	
Total rejected, unmarked and declined ballots		418	1.03	+0.19
Turnout		40,671	55.62	–2.27
Eligible voters		73,117		
Liberal hold		Swing		–10.92
Source: Elections Ontario

2003 Ontario general election
Party	Candidate	Votes	%	±%
Liberal	Michael Colle	23,743	56.89	+0.11
Progressive Conservative	Corinne Korzen	12,402	29.72	–5.53
New Democratic	Robin Alter	4,351	10.43	+6.11
Green	Mark Viitala	1,236	2.96	+1.86
Total valid votes		41,732	99.16	
Total rejected, unmarked and declined ballots		353	0.84	–0.44
Turnout		42,085	57.90	–2.92
Eligible voters		72,691		
Liberal hold		Swing		+2.82
Source: Elections Ontario

1999 Ontario general election
Party	Candidate	Votes	%
Liberal	Michael Colle	24,151	56.78
Progressive Conservative	John Parker	14,994	35.25
New Democratic	Jay Waterman	1,835	4.31
Family Coalition	Frank D'Angelo	821	1.93
Green	Shelly Lipsey	470	1.10
Natural Law	Neil C. Dickie	263	0.62
Total valid votes		42,534	98.72
Total rejected, unmarked and declined ballots		553	1.28
Turnout		43,087	60.82
Eligible voters		70,845	
Liberal pickup new district.			
Source: Elections Ontario

== 2007 electoral reform referendum ==
2007 Ontario electoral reform referendum
Side	Votes	%
First Past the Post	23,405	60.9
Mixed member proportional	15,052	39.1
Total valid votes	38,457	100.0

== See also ==
- List of Ontario provincial electoral districts
- Canadian provincial electoral districts
