= Michael Colle =

Canadian politician from Toronto (born 1945)

The Honourable Mike Colle ECO
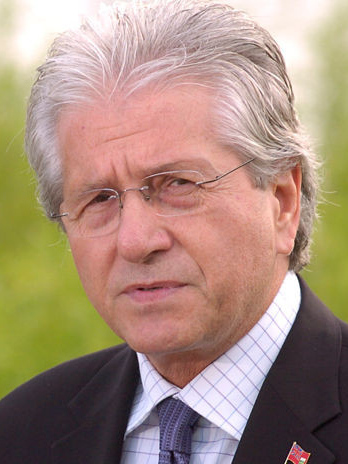
- Colle in 2006

Deputy Mayor of Toronto for North York
- Incumbent
- Assumed office August 10, 2023
- Mayor: Olivia Chow
- Preceded by: Denzil Minnan-Wong (2022)

Toronto City Councillor for Ward 8 Eglinton—Lawrence
- Incumbent
- Assumed office December 1, 2018
- Preceded by: Ward established

Member of the Ontario Provincial Parliament for Eglinton—Lawrence (Oakwood; 1995–1999)
- In office June 8, 1995 – June 7, 2018
- Preceded by: Tony Rizzo
- Succeeded by: Robin Martin

Personal details
- Born: February 1, 1945 (age 81) Foggia, Apulia, Kingdom of Italy
- Party: Independent (1982–1994; 2018–present)
- Other political affiliations: Ontario Liberal (1995–2018)
- Spouse: Sharon
- Children: Josh Colle
- Education: Carleton University
- Occupation: Teacher

Michael Colle (/koʊl/ "Cole"; born February 1, 1945) is a Canadian politician who has served as deputy mayor of Toronto since 2023, representing North York. He was elected to represent Ward 8 Eglinton—Lawrence on Toronto City Council in the 2018 election. Colle served in the Legislative Assembly of Ontario from 1995 to 2018 and was a Cabinet minister during Premier Dalton McGuinty's tenure. He was formerly a York city councillor and Metro Toronto councillor, where he sat as the chair of the Toronto Transit Commission (TTC) from 1991 to 1994.

== Background ==
Mike Colle moved to Canada at a young age from Italy with his family, and was educated at Carleton University. Mike Colle has siblings including Robert Colle who worked as a teacher of geography at St. Oscar Romero Catholic Secondary School and a teacher of law, social studies & physical education at Marian Academy Catholic Secondary School, and has now retired. Mike Colle also worked as a teacher of history and economics for eighteen years, including several years at Michael Power High School and St. Michael's College School in Toronto, Ontario.

His son Josh was a member of Toronto City Council between 2010 and 2018.

His cousin is former politician Lorenzo Berardinetti. Colle and Berardinetti's families lived in the same home in downtown Toronto when they were children and the two cousins served together as Liberal MPPs in Queen's Park.

== Politics ==
=== Early political career ===
Colle served on the City of York council for Ward 2 from 1982 to 1985, and on the Metro Toronto Council representing York Eglinton from 1988 to 1994. He was also chair of the Toronto Transit Commission from 1991 to 1994.

=== Provincial politics ===
Colle was elected to the Ontario legislature in the 1995 provincial election, defeating incumbent Tony Rizzo in the riding of Oakwood. In 1996, Colle supported Dwight Duncan's unsuccessful bid to become Ontario Liberal Party leader. In the 1999 provincial election, Colle defeated incumbent John Parker in the redistributed riding of Eglinton—Lawrence. The Ontario Progressive Conservative (PC) Party won both elections, and Colle sat in opposition during this period.

==== Backbench ====
Colle championed environmental causes during his time in the legislature including the protection of the Oak Ridges Moraine. He was a co-chair of Mel Lastman's 1997 bid to become Mayor of Toronto.

==== 2003 election ====
The Liberals won the 2003 election. Colle was re-elected in Eglinton—Lawrence.

==== Cabinet ====
Colle was named to cabinet on June 29, 2005, as Minister of Citizenship and Immigration. From October 2007 to February 2010 he was Chief Government Whip.

He was criticized for his role in giving out $32 million in government grants to immigrant and cultural groups without official applications or formal statements of purpose. In one case that the auditor general highlighted, the Ontario Cricket Association received $1 million when it asked for $150,000. Premier McGuinty agreed to commission a special report on the matter, to be released in July 2007. Colle was to appear before the Standing Committee on Estimates before the Legislature was prorogued by the premier. Some believe this was arranged to prevent his testimony from going public. On July 26, 2007, Colle resigned as Minister of Citizenship and Immigration. Gerry Phillips was sworn in as the new Minister of Citizenship and Immigration, in addition to his responsibilities as Minister of Government Services.

==== 2007 election ====
In the 2007 provincial election, Colle was re-elected to serve his fourth term to represent Eglinton—Lawrence.

On February 24, 2009, Colle introduced the Zero Tolerance to Violence on Public Transit Act, 2009 in an attempt to address the growing incidence of gun violence on Toronto public transit.

On March 25, 2009, Colle appeared to buck his own party by introducing Bill 160: The Caregiver and Foreign Worker Recruitment Act, 2009. This was in response to a Toronto Star report on the abuse of foreign nannies. After some initial reluctance by the government, Colle was able to convince the labour minister and the government to intervene. The government committed to introducing legislation to license "nanny brokers", ban placement fees, and post licensed placement agencies on an online registry.

The McGuinty government introduced Bill 210, Employment Protection for Foreign Nationals Act (Live-in Caregivers and Others), 2009 (EPFNA) on October 21, 2009, and passed the "Nanny Protection Act" on December 15, 2009.

In 2010, Colle took on the issue of bedbugs eventually convincing Health Minister Deb Matthews to provide $5 million to fight the scourge with a bedbug strategy.

Colle also spent most of his fourth term advocating to get the Eglinton Crosstown LRT built. The provincial government has committed $8 billion for the new Eglinton line that runs along the southern border of his riding. Colle had advocated for the construction of the LRT following the Mike Harris government cancellation of the construction of the Eglinton West Line in 1996.

==== 2011 election ====
In October 2011 he was re-elected to serve his fifth term to represent Eglinton—Lawrence. He was appointed as the Parliamentary Assistant to the Minister of Transportation and the Minister of Infrastructure. During this term Colle organized a petition requesting the addition of Oakwood station on the Eglinton Crosstown LRT line.

==== 2014 election and 2018 defeat ====
In June 2014 he was re-elected to serve his sixth term to represent Eglinton—Lawrence. He served as parliamentary assistant to the minister of transportation. He was also appointed as deputy government whip.

In March 2016 Colle tabled the Tomato Act, proclaiming the tomato as the official vegetable of Ontario and designating July 15 as Tomato Day. The bill died on the order paper.

He was defeated in the 2018 provincial election.

=== Return to municipal politics ===
==== 2018 election ====
Weeks after the provincial election, Colle registered as a candidate for Toronto City Council's Ward 13 (which was essentially Ward 15 from the 2014 election, with some boundary adjustments) in the 2018 Toronto municipal election, after his son Josh Colle, the incumbent Ward 15 city councillor, announced his retirement from politics.

In the last-minute redistricting imposed by the provincial government, Wards 13 and 14 (essentially corresponding to 2014 Wards 15 and 16) became the new Ward 8, so that Colle was now running against Christin Carmichael Greb, incumbent councillor from the former Ward 16. Colle won with 14,094 votes (41% of votes in the ward) to 7,395 for Carmichael Greb.

==== Work on council ====
In April 2019, Colle announced that he is going to introduce a motion that would ask the Alcohol and Gaming Commission of Ontario (AGCO) to suspend the liquor licence of bars where gun violence happens frequently.

In September 2020, Colle has requested that protected bike lanes be installed along Yonge Street from south of St. Clair Avenue to north of Lawrence Avenue in conjunction with on-street patios and other traffic-calming measures. The motion was approved by the city council on October 29 in a 19 to 3 vote, Councillor Stephen Holyday, one of the councillors voting against the motion, argued that approving this will create a bottleneck on an already congested thoroughfare that also serves as a vital backup artery for TTC subway replacement. Colle defended the plan claiming that the city's goal is to move beyond people using cars to travel around the city's core. When the province of Ontario enacted measures that required the city to remove bike lanes from various city corridors, Colle proposed that the city put signs up highlighting where the changes increased commuters average commute times.

Colle has been critical of delays to the Eglinton Crosstown, which passes through his ward and has been delayed five years in opening. In 2024, Colle seconded a motion by another city councillor, Josh Matlow, calling for a public inquiry into the construction delays, and requesting the provincial minister, Prabmeet Sarkaria, depute before the city council.

On October 7, 2020, Colle tabled a motion to rename Locksley Avenue, from Eglinton Avenue West to Hopewell Avenue, to Jimmy Wisdom Way. Jimmy Wisdom was a local community icon and renowned musical performer as a young man in Montego Bay, Jamaica.

Mayor Olivia Chow appointed Colle as one of four deputy mayors in 2023. As deputy mayor, Colle was one of the supporters for the renaming of Dundas Square to Sankofa square.

Throughout 2024, Colle maintained a focus on crime issues, bringing motions on car theft, hosting a summit on small business break-ins after increases in both crimes, and criticizing antisemitic graffiti. The motion on auto-theft proposed that the city conduct intergovernmental cooperation to revoke licenses from those convicted of auto theft, and ban the export of used cars through major Canadian ports.

In response to tariffs threatened and then levied by the United States of America both before and during 2025, Colle has proposed worsening business conditions in the city for the company Tesla and put forward a motion promoting buying local in city procurement, disagreeing that there would be major cost implications for procurement. Colle had also previously opposed the expansion of rideshares, proposing an amendment, which ultimately was included, to a broader environmental motion about rideshares. The amendment proposed to cap the total number of rideshare drivers in the city.

==== Housing ====
Colle advocates for the reintroduction of a speculation tax as part of a solution to address the rising price of housing in Toronto. Colle asked the province in December 2021 to introduce a tax on the sale of homes that are not principal residences in an effort to discourage speculators and "home flippers." Ontario previously had such a tax under the government of Bill Davis in the 1970s.

Colle has been described as one of "three Toronto councillors hopelessly exacerbating the housing crisis" by More Neighbours Toronto. Colle opposed a proposal for an addition of a 50-storey development, acknowledging that while the site was zoned for tower development, that he believed the project lacked of harmony with the existing development pattern, would exacerbate congestion and lacked proper access for garbage services.

==== Sponsored trips ====
In November 2025, Colle attended a briefing in Israel by Deputy Foreign Minister Sharren Haskel while on a trip sponsored by the Israeli government.

==== Noise cameras ====
Colle was the lone dissenter in the May 2026 City Council vote on the motion on "Toronto Needs Provincial Support to Enable Noise Camera Enforcement Now".

== Electoral record ==
2026 Toronto municipal election, Ward 8 Eglinton—Lawrence
Candidate	Votes	%	minus
Mike Colle (X)	32,085	70.26	0.05 ▼
Liz Grade	4,914	10.76	–
Jason McDonald	4,417	9.67	–
Enzo Torrone	2,591	5.67	–
Domenico Maiolo	1,001	2.19	0.08 ▲
Daniel Trayes	657	1.44	–

2022 Toronto municipal election, Ward 8 Eglinton—Lawrence
Candidate	Votes	Vote share
Mike Colle	17,109	70.31%
Evan Sambasivam	3,447	14.17%
Wendy Weston	1,990	8.18%
Philip Davidovits	1,275	5.24%
Domenico Maiolo	513	2.19%
Total	24,334	100%
Source: City of Toronto

2018 Toronto municipal election, Ward 8 Eglinton—Lawrence
Candidate	Votes	Vote share
Mike Colle	14,094	41.34%
Christin Carmichael Greb	7,395	21.69%
Dyanoosh Youssefi	5,253	15.41%
Beth Levy	3,122	9.16%
Jennifer Arp	2,404	7.05%
Lauralyn Johnston	992	2.91%
Josh Pede	420	1.23%
Darren Dunlop	210	0.62%
Randall Pancer	134	0.39%
Peter Tijiri	72	0.21%
Total	34,096	100%
Source: City of Toronto

2018 Ontario general election: Eglinton—Lawrence
Party	Candidate	Votes	%	±%
Progressive Conservative	Robin Martin	19,999	40.38	+6.62
Liberal	Michael Colle	19,042	38.45	–16.35
New Democratic	Robyn Vilde	8,985	18.14	+10.80
Green	Reuben Anthony Deboer	1,190	2.40	–0.73
Libertarian	Michael Staffieri	211	0.43	–
Trillium	Lionel Wayne Poizner	100	0.20	–
Total valid votes		49,527	99.03	
Total rejected, unmarked and declined ballots		484	0.97	+0.08
Turnout		50,011	60.11	+6.12
Eligible voters		83,202		
Progressive Conservative gain from Liberal		Swing		+11.49
Source: Elections Ontario

2014 Ontario general election
Party	Candidate	Votes	%	±%
Liberal	Mike Colle	22,825	54.8	
Progressive Conservative	Robin Martin	14,069	33.7	
New Democratic	Thomas Gallezot	3,044	7.3	
Green	Lucas McCann	1,314	3.2	
Freedom	Michael Bone	265	0.6	
Independent	Jerry Green	144	0.3	

2011 Ontario general election
Party	Candidate	Votes	%	±%
Liberal	Mike Colle	20,752	54.1	
Progressive Conservative	Rocco Rossi	12,857	33.5	
New Democratic	Gerti Dervershi	3,763	9.8	
Green	Josh Rachlis	575	1.5	
Freedom	Michael Bone	152	0.4	
Independent	Jerry Green	146	0.4	
Independent	Sujith Kumar Reddy	79	0.2	

2007 Ontario general election
Party	Candidate	Votes	%	±%
Liberal	Mike Colle	17,324	43.1	
Progressive Conservative	Bernie Tanz	15,098	37.5	
New Democratic	Karin Wiens	4,135	10.3	
Green	Andrew James	2,899	7.2	
Libertarian	Tom Gelmon	296	0.7	
Family Coalition	Rina Morra	253	0.6	
Freedom	Franz Cauchi	128	0.3	
Independent	Joseph Young	107	0.3	

2003 Ontario general election
Party	Candidate	Votes	%	±%
Liberal	Mike Colle	23,743	56.89	+0.11
Progressive Conservative	Corinne Korzen	12,402	29.72	-5.53
New Democratic	Robin Alter	43,51	10.43	+6.12
Green	Mark Viitala	1,236	2.96	+1.86

1999 Ontario general election
Party	Candidate	Votes	%
Liberal	Mike Colle	24,151	56.78
Progressive Conservative	John Parker	14,994	35.25
New Democratic	Jay Waterman	1,835	4.31
Family Coalition	Frank D'Angelo	821	1.93
Green	Shelly Lipsey	470	1.1
Natural Law	Neil C. Dickie	263	0.62

1995 Ontario general election
Party	Candidate	Votes	%
Liberal	Mike Colle	8,599	
New Democratic	(x)Tony Rizzo	7,624	
Progressive Conservative	Courtney Doldron	3,298	
Independent	Joseph Flexer	821	
Green	Constantine Kritsonis	269	
Natural Law	Doug Storey	135	
Libertarian	Nunzio Venuto	100	

McGuinty ministry, Province of Ontario (2003–2013)
Cabinet post (1)
Predecessor	Office	Successor
Marie Bountrogianni	Minister of Citizenship and Immigration; 2005–2007	Gerry Phillips

Preceded by Lois Griffin	Chair of the Toronto Transit Commission; 1991–1994	Succeeded by Paul Christie
