= John Godfrey =

Canadian politician (1942–2023)

The Honourable John Godfrey PC CM
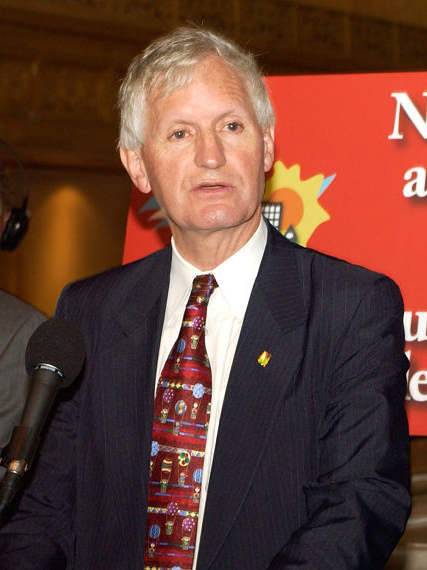
- Godfrey in 2005

Member of Parliament for Don Valley West
- In office October 25, 1993 – August 1, 2008
- Preceded by: John Bosley
- Succeeded by: Rob Oliphant

Personal details
- Born: December 19, 1942 Toronto, Ontario, Canada
- Died: December 18, 2023 (aged 80) Toronto, Ontario, Canada
- Party: Liberal
- Spouse: Trish Bongard
- Education: Trinity College, Toronto (BA); Balliol College, Oxford (MPhil); St Antony's College, Oxford (DPhil)
- Profession: Economist, historian, journalist, editor, administrator
- Portfolio: Minister of State for Infrastructure and Communities (2004–2006)

John Ferguson Godfrey PC CM (December 19, 1942 – December 18, 2023) was a Canadian educator, journalist and politician who served as a member of Parliament from 1993 to 2008.

== Background ==
Godfrey was born in Toronto, Ontario on December 19, 1942. His father, Senator John Morrow Godfrey (June 28, 1912 – March 8, 2001), was a Canadian pilot, lawyer and politician. John Godfrey graduated from Upper Canada College in 1960. In 1961, he attended the Neuchâtel Junior College in Neuchâtel, Switzerland.

In 1965, he received a Bachelor of Arts degree from Trinity College, University of Toronto and in 1967, he received a Master of Philosophy from Balliol College, Oxford and Doctor of Philosophy (DPhil) from St Antony's College, Oxford in 1975. He worked as an economist, historian and journalist. In the mid-1970s Godfrey was a history professor at Dalhousie University in Halifax, Nova Scotia. He served as president of the University of King's College from 1977 to 1987, and founded the university's prestigious Bachelor of Journalism program. From 1987 to 1991 he was editor of the Financial Post.

Godfrey died at his home in Toronto on December 18, 2023, one day before his 81st birthday.

== Politics ==
Godfrey was elected to the House of Commons of Canada as the Liberal member of Parliament for the Toronto area riding of Don Valley West in the 1993 election, and was re-elected in each subsequent vote until his retirement from federal politics in 2008.

During the 1995 Quebec referendum, Godfrey had an acquaintance perform a psychiatric evaluation of separatist leader Lucien Bouchard.

In 1996, he and fellow Liberal MP Peter Milliken introduced the Godfrey–Milliken Bill a parody of the American Helms–Burton Act. The gesture received extensive media coverage including in the United States, where Godfrey was featured on the CBS program 60 Minutes. From 1996 to 2004, Godfrey served as a parliamentary secretary under Prime Minister Jean Chrétien.

== Minister of State for Infrastructure and Communities ==
In 2003, Paul Martin succeeded Chrétien as Liberal leader and prime minister. Following the subsequent 2004 election, Godfrey, among other key Martin allies, was appointed to the Cabinet in the role of Minister of State for Infrastructure and Communities. In this role, he was primarily responsible for overseeing the "New Deal for Cities", Federation of Canadian Municipalities relationship, and other initiatives in Canadian federal-municipal relations. This role was considered a keystone of Martin's industrial strategy.

== Liberal leadership ==
On February 3, 2006, CBC Newsworld's Don Newman announced on air that Godfrey was planning a run for the Liberal Party leadership. Godfrey declared his candidacy on Goldhawk Live on March 19, shortly after the rules and convention date were set. Media reaction was positive, but competed with coverage of Ashley MacIsaac, who declared his intention to run to the Halifax Daily News the next day.

In the early stages of the campaign he was recurrently cited as exemplar of intellectualism in the race, being one of three former university professors in the running. Name-recognition remained a challenge, but Godfrey received plaudits in the Canadian blogosphere for his performance in the first all-candidates meeting at the Liberal Party of Alberta convention on April 8.

On April 12, 2006, Godfrey announced his withdrawal from the race, due to concerns about his health. On October 20, 2006, Godfrey announced his support for Bob Rae for the federal Liberal leadership. He made the announcement at the National Press Club, on the occasion of a speech by Rae on the environment.

== Leaving politics ==
Godfrey announced in November 2007 his intention to resign his parliamentary seat on July 1, 2008 and would leave earlier if an election were called before that date. He later delayed his resignation date until August 1. The Conservative Party alleged that the Liberals chose to delay the by-election for financial reasons though Godfrey's office stated that the delay was due to a private members bill Godfrey had worked on not being given Royal Assent until June 26.

On June 17, in a point of order following Question Period, Godfrey gave his resignation speech to the House of Commons.

== Headmaster of the Toronto French School ==
John Godfrey left politics to become Headmaster of the Toronto French School, an independent school in the Lawrence Park area with two campuses in Toronto. He held the position from 2008 until resigning in June 2014.

The Government of Ontario appointed John Godfrey Special Advisor for Climate Change and Chair of the Government's Climate Action Group in March 2015, positions he held until June 2018.
