= Don Valley West (federal electoral district) =

Federal electoral district in Ontario, Canada

Coordinates: 43.730°N 79.375°W

Ontario electoral district
- Interactive map of riding boundaries from the 2025 federal election

Federal electoral district
- Legislature: House of Commons
MP
Rob Oliphant
Liberal
- District created: 1976
- First contested: 1979
- Last contested: 2021
- District webpage: profile, map

Demographics
- Population (2021): 101,959
- Electors (2015): 69,333
- Area (km²): 30.22
- Pop. density (per km²): 3,373.9
- Census division: Toronto
- Census subdivision: Toronto (part)

Don Valley West (French: Don Valley-Ouest) is a federal electoral district in Ontario, Canada, that has been represented in the House of Commons of Canada since 1979. Its population in 2001 was 115,539.

Its most high-profile MPs have been John Bosley, who was Speaker of the House 1984-86 and John Godfrey, who served in the cabinet of Prime Minister Paul Martin as a Minister of State.

== Demographics ==
According to the 2021 Canadian census

Languages: 55.1% English, 4.6% Mandarin, 4.3% Urdu, 2.8% Persian, 2.8% Cantonese, 1.9% Spanish, 1.7% Arabic, 1.7% Tagalog, 1.4% French, 1.2% Korean, 1.1% Russian, 1.1% Pashto, 1.1% Portuguese
Religions: 41.3% Christian (17.5% Catholic, 4.5% Anglican, 4.5% Christian Orthodox, 3,7% United Church, 1.0% Presbyterian, 8.0% Other), 16.5% Muslim, 6.3% Jewish, 2.2% Hindu, 31.8% None
Median income: $47,600 (2020)

Average income: $113,600 (2020)

Panethnic groups in Don Valley West (2011−2021)
Panethnic group	2021		2016		2011	
Panethnic group	Pop.	%	Pop.	%	Pop.	%
European (Note: Statistic includes all persons that did not make up part of a visible minority or an indigenous identity.)	53,110	52.57%	58,960	57.92%	62,905	63.58%
East Asian (Note: Statistic includes total responses of "Chinese", "Korean", and "Japanese" under visible minority section on census.)	14,535	14.39%	13,310	13.08%	11,135	11.25%
South Asian	13,410	13.27%	13,555	13.32%	12,445	12.58%
Middle Eastern (Note: Statistic includes total responses of "West Asian" and "Arab" under visible minority section on census.)	6,855	6.79%	5,450	5.35%	3,990	4.03%
Southeast Asian (Note: Statistic includes total responses of "Filipino" and "Southeast Asian" under visible minority section on census.)	4,125	4.08%	3,585	3.52%	3,385	3.42%
African	3,835	3.8%	3,060	3.01%	2,060	2.08%
Latin American	2,150	2.13%	1,425	1.4%	1,090	1.1%
Indigenous	500	0.49%	580	0.57%	465	0.47%
Other/multiracial (Note: Statistic includes total responses of "Visible minority, n.i.e." and "Multiple visible minorities" under visible minority section on census.)	2,510	2.48%	1,870	1.84%	1,460	1.48%
Total responses	101,025	99.08%	101,790	99.3%	98,935	99.11%
Total population	101,959	100%	102,508	100%	99,820	100%
Notes: Totals greater than 100% due to multiple origin responses. Demographics based on 2012 Canadian federal electoral redistribution riding boundaries.

== Geography ==
The district includes the neighbourhoods of York Mills, Silver Hills, the western half of Don Mills, the eastern half of Lawrence Park, Leaside, and Thorncliffe Park in the City of Toronto–mostly in the former municipalities of North York and East York. The area is 37 km².

== History ==
The federal electoral district was created in 1976 from Don Valley riding.

John Godfrey, who had represented the riding since 1993, announced in November 2007 that he would be resigning his seat on July 1, 2008 in order to accept a position as headmaster of Toronto French School and would leave earlier if an election were called before that date. Godfrey subsequently postponed his resignation until August 1.

On August 17, 2008, the Prime Minister's Office issued a press release on behalf of Prime Minister Stephen Harper announcing a by-election for Don Valley West on September 22, 2008. The by-election was canceled with the announcement of the federal election to be held on October 14, 2008.

This riding lost significant territory to Don Valley East and gained territory from St. Paul's during the 2012 electoral redistribution.

=== Former boundaries ===
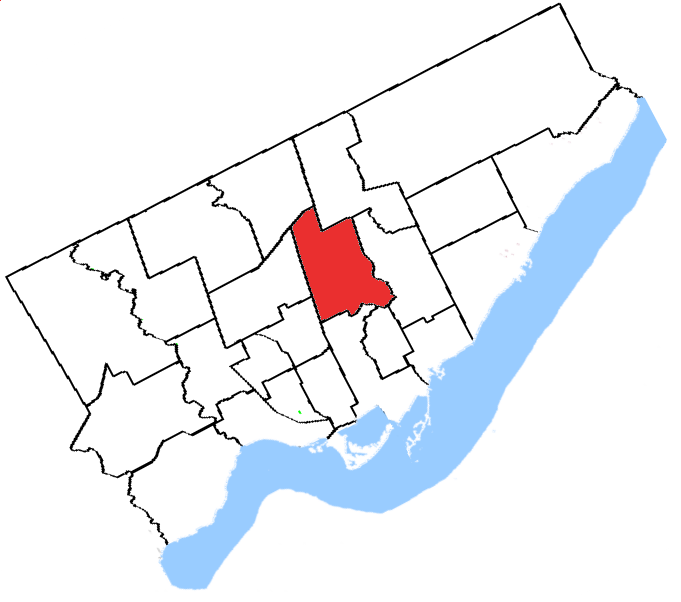
1976 to 1987

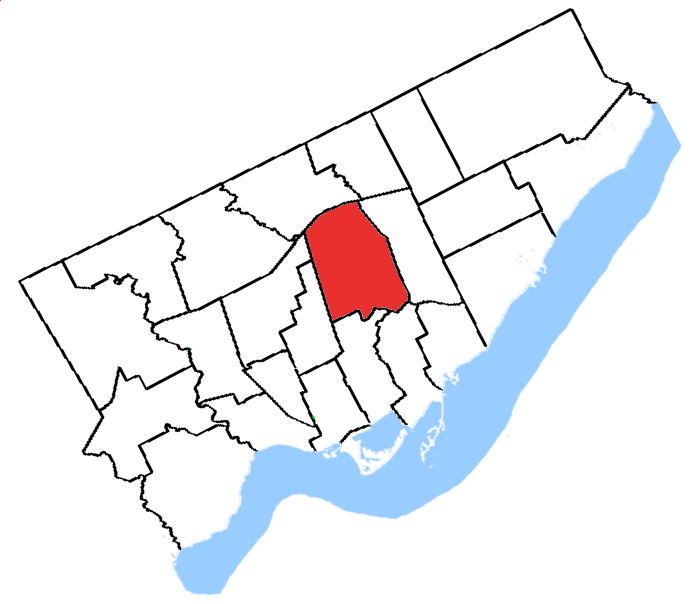
1987 to 1996

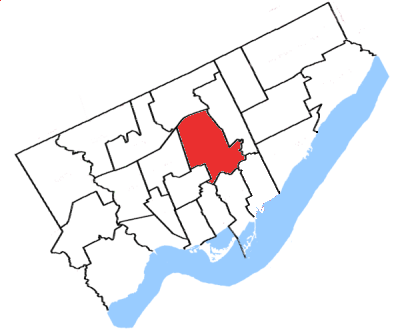
1996 to 2003

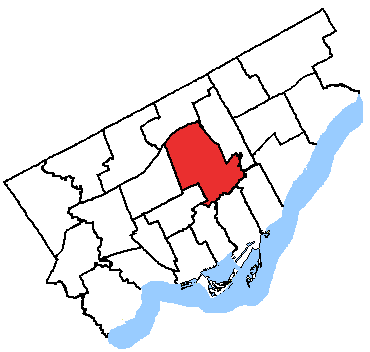
2003 to 2015

=== Members of Parliament ===
This riding has elected the following members of Parliament:

Parliament	Years	Member	Party
Don Valley West; Riding created from Don Valley
31st	1979–1980	John Bosley	Progressive Conservative
32nd	1980–1984	John Bosley	Progressive Conservative
33rd	1984–1988	John Bosley	Progressive Conservative
34th	1988–1993	John Bosley	Progressive Conservative
35th	1993–1997	John Godfrey	Liberal
36th	1997–2000	John Godfrey	Liberal
37th	2000–2004	John Godfrey	Liberal
38th	2004–2006	John Godfrey	Liberal
39th	2006–2008	John Godfrey	Liberal
40th	2008–2011	Rob Oliphant	Liberal
41st	2011–2015	John Carmichael	Conservative
42nd	2015–2019	Rob Oliphant	Liberal
43rd	2019–2021	Rob Oliphant	Liberal
44th	2021–2025	Rob Oliphant	Liberal
45th	2025–present	Rob Oliphant	Liberal

== Election results ==
Graph of general election results in Don Valley West (minor parties that never got 2% of the vote or didn't run consistently are omitted)

2025 Canadian federal election
Party	Candidate	Votes	%	±%	Expenditures
Liberal	Rob Oliphant	36,744	62.6	+5.40	
Conservative	Robert Pierce	19,480	33.2	+3.30	
New Democratic	Linnea Löfström-Abary	1,382	2.4	–6.80	
Green	Sheena Sharp	616	1.1	–0.01	
Independent	Bahira Abdulsalam	442	0.8	N/A	
Total valid votes/expense limit		58,664	99.2	—	
Total rejected ballots		479	0.8	—	
Turnout		59,143	68.8	+2.5	
Eligible voters		85,928			
Liberal hold		Swing		+1.05	
Source: Elections Canada

2021 Canadian federal election
Party	Candidate	Votes	%	±%	Expenditures
Liberal	Rob Oliphant	24,798	52.7	-3.1	$98,666.75
Conservative	Yvonne Robertson	16,695	35.5	+4.3	$93,591.10
New Democratic	Syeda Riaz	3,814	8.1	+0.8	$26.24
People's	Michael Minas	881	1.9	+1.0	$1,582.23
Green	Elvira Caputolan	761	1.6	-2.7	$0.00
Centrist	Adil Khan	65	0.1	N/A	$5,233.16
Total valid votes/expense limit		47,014	99.2	–	$107,129.06
Total rejected ballots		363	0.8		
Turnout		47,377	66.3		
Eligible voters		71,465			
Liberal hold		Swing		-3.7	
Source: Elections Canada

2021 federal election redistributed results
Party	Vote	%
Liberal	29,537	57.23
Conservative	15,436	29.91
New Democratic	4,730	9.16
People's	1,309	2.54
Green	548	1.06
Others	55	0.11

2019 Canadian federal election
Party	Candidate	Votes	%	±%	Expenditures
Liberal	Rob Oliphant	29,148	55.8	+2.02	$97,454.94
Conservative	Yvonne Robertson	16,304	31.2	-6.40	$98,556.64
New Democratic	Laurel MacDowell	3,804	7.3	+1.28	$0.00
Green	Amanda Kistindey	2,257	4.3	+2.64	$0.98
People's	Ian Prittie	444	0.9	-	$3,650.11
Libertarian	John Kittredge	277	0.5	-0.14	$0.00
Total valid votes/expense limit		52,234	100.0		
Total rejected ballots		422			
Turnout		52,656	71.5		
Eligible voters		73,652			
Liberal hold		Swing		+4.21	
Source: Elections Canada

2015 Canadian federal election
Party	Candidate	Votes	%	±%	Expenditures
Liberal	Rob Oliphant	27,472	53.78	+12.29	$146,981.61
Conservative	John Carmichael	19,206	37.60	-6.29	$142,970.98
New Democratic	Syeda Riaz	3,076	6.02	-4.73	$14,563.91
Green	Natalie Hunt	848	1.66	-1.91	–
Libertarian	John Kittredge	325	0.64	–	$202.00
Communist	Elizabeth Hill	84	0.16		–
Independent	Sharon Cromwell	75	0.15	–	–
Total valid votes/Expense limit		51,086	100.00		$203,797.06
Total rejected ballots		217	0.42		
Turnout		51,303	72.22		
Electors on lists		71,037			
Liberal gain from Conservative		Swing		+9.29	
Source: Elections Canada

2011 federal election redistributed results
Party	Vote	%
Conservative	19,893	43.89
Liberal	18,805	41.49
New Democratic	4,871	10.75
Green	1,616	3.57
Others	140	0.31

2011 Canadian federal election
Party	Candidate	Votes	%	±%	Expenditures
Conservative	John Carmichael	22,962	42.93	+4.11	–
Liberal	Rob Oliphant	22,351	41.79	-2.57	–
New Democratic	Nicole Yovanoff	6,280	11.74	+1.55	–
Green	Georgina Wilcock	1,703	3.18	-3.12	–
Communist	Dimitris Kabitsis	186	0.35	+0.02	–
Total valid votes		53,482	100.00	–	
Total rejected ballots		176	0.33	–	
Turnout		53,658	66.84	–	
Eligible voters		80,276	–	–	
Conservative gain from Liberal		Swing		+3.34	

2008 Canadian federal election
Party	Candidate	Votes	%	±%	Expenditures
Liberal	Rob Oliphant	22,212	44.36	-9.2	$60,129
Conservative	John Carmichael	19,441	38.83	+5.6	$82,633
New Democratic	David Sparrow	5,102	10.19	+1.1	$67,984
Green	Georgina Wilcock	3,155	6.30	+2.8	$10,725
Communist	Catherine Holliday	162	0.32	–	
Total valid votes/Expense limit		50,072	100.00	$85,470	
Total rejected ballots		–			
Turnout		–	62.8		
Liberal hold		Swing		-7.4	

2006 Canadian federal election
Party	Candidate	Votes	%	±%
Liberal	John Godfrey	28,709	53.4	-6.4
Conservative	John Carmichael	17,908	33.3	+5.0
New Democratic	David Thomas	4,902	9.1	+0.5
Green	Daphne So	1,906	3.5	+0.2
Libertarian	Soumen Deb	226	0.4	
Canadian Action	Paul Barnes	151	0.3	
Total valid votes		53,802	100.0	

2004 Canadian federal election
Party	Candidate	Votes	%	±%
Liberal	John Godfrey	30,615	59.8	+4.4
Conservative	David Turnbull	14,495	28.3	-10.7
New Democratic	David Thomas	4,393	8.6	+4.2
Green	Serge Abbat	1,703	3.3	
Total valid votes		51,206	100.0	

Note: Conservative vote is compared to the total of the Canadian Alliance vote and Progressive Conservative vote in 2000 election.

2000 Canadian federal election
Party	Candidate	Votes	%	±%
Liberal	John Godfrey	25,329	55.4	+2.4
Progressive Conservative	Michael Murton	10,583	23.1	-7.3
Alliance	John Wakelin	7,239	15.8	+6.4
New Democratic	Ali Naqvi	2,024	4.4	-1.5
Marijuana	Greg Stock	469	1.0	
Marxist–Leninist	Fernand Deschamps	97	0.2	0.0
Total valid votes		45,741	100.0	

Note: Canadian Alliance vote is compared to the Reform vote in 1997 election.

1997 Canadian federal election
Party	Candidate	Votes	%	±%
Liberal	John Godfrey	26,209	52.9	+3.3
Progressive Conservative	Joanne Flint	15,046	30.4	+1.4
Reform	Jonathan Silbert	4,669	9.4	-5.7
New Democratic	Richard Tiller	2,922	5.9	+3.2
Green	Dan King	378	0.8	+0.2
Natural Law	Debbie Webberg	173	0.3	-0.2
Marxist–Leninist	Judith A. Snow	104	0.2	
Total valid votes		49,501	100.0	

1993 Canadian federal election
Party	Candidate	Votes	%	±%
Liberal	John Godfrey	25,756	49.7	+12.9
Progressive Conservative	John Bosley	15,023	29.0	-24.4
Reform	Julian Pope	7,872	15.2	
New Democratic	Leonard Swartz	1,410	2.7	-5.6
National	Dorothy Campbell	1,111	2.1	
Green	Dan King	302	0.6	
Natural Law	Bob Pepper	262	0.5	
Independent	Judith A. Snow	91	0.2	
Abolitionist	Stephen Wilson	26	0.1	
Total valid votes		51,853	100.0	

1988 Canadian federal election
Party	Candidate	Votes	%	±%
Progressive Conservative	John Bosley	27,683	53.3	-6.6
Liberal	Liz Yorke	19,097	36.8	+11.0
New Democratic	Ian Cameron	4,307	8.3	-4.9
Libertarian	Clarke Slemon	408	0.8	-0.4
Independent	J. Michael McCutcheon	292	0.6	
Communist	Chris Frazer	73	0.1	
Commonwealth of Canada	Peter Hetherington	36	0.1	
Total valid votes		51,896	100.0	

1984 Canadian federal election
Party	Candidate	Votes	%	±%
Progressive Conservative	John Bosley	29,905	59.9	+8.2
Liberal	David Wishart	12,855	25.8	-12.0
New Democratic	Ian Cameron	6,570	13.2	+3.5
Libertarian	Michael Beech	577	1.2	+0.4
Total valid votes		49,907	100.0	

1980 Canadian federal election
Party	Candidate	Votes	%	±%
Progressive Conservative	John Bosley	25,260	51.8	-2.3
Liberal	Frank Felkai	18,430	37.8	+3.3
New Democratic	Jonathan Lomas	4,702	9.6	-1.0
Libertarian	Scott Bell	365	0.7	0.0
Marxist–Leninist	Ian Hyman	42	0.1	0.0
Total valid votes		48,799	100.0	

1979 Canadian federal election
Party	Candidate	Votes	%
Progressive Conservative	John Bosley	28,427	54.1
Liberal	Frank Felkai	18,117	34.5
New Democratic	Jean Smith	5,572	10.6
Libertarian	Scott Bell	405	0.8
Marxist–Leninist	Ian Hyman	34	0.1
Total valid votes		52,555	100.0

== See also ==
- List of Canadian electoral districts
- Historical federal electoral districts of Canada
