= Asthma Canada =

Canadian charity

- Type: Health Charity
- Registration no.: 898537048RR0001
- Headquarters: Toronto, Ontario, Canada
- Coordinates: 43°45′54″N 79°24′42″W
- Region served: Canada
- President & CEO: Jeffrey Beach
- Main organ: Board of Directors
- Website: www.asthma.ca

Asthma Canada, formerly the Asthma Society of Canada, is a non-profit charity dedicated to enhancing the quality of life and health for people living with asthma and associated allergies. It has a threefold focus on education, research, and advocacy, to continue improving lives for all those with asthma. Asthma Canada represents over 3.8 million Canadians living with asthma, along with their caregivers and all others impacted by asthma, and also provides resources for people suffering from allergies.

== History ==
The Asthma Society of Canada was founded in 1973 to fill a need for an organisation that was solely dedicated to relieving those suffering from asthma. The organisation was a coalition of asthma community members and leading Canadian researchers with the purpose of using science and community support to help people with asthma lead better lives. At the time of the foundation, a Professional Advisory Committee was established by Dr. Cecil Collins-Williams of the Toronto General Hospital, Dr. Irvin Broder of the Gage Research Institute, and Dr. Harold Williams of the Crippled Children's Centre. Asthma Canada continues to be driven by the scientific community, ensuring that all the information they publish comes from valid sources and peer-reviewed studies. Once it attained non-profit status, the ASC focused primarily on education. Its name was formally changed to Asthma Canada in 2017, and they have broadened their focus to include support services, research, and advocacy.

== What They Do ==
Educating the public continues to be a priority for AC, driving them to consistently release information about how to live well with asthma on their website and social media pages. Their focus on advocating for Canadians with asthma has brought them to an anti-coal clean air initiative, and urges for comprehensive healthcare on the part of the Canadian government to increase access to prescription medication. They currently head two research funds, the Dr. Goran Enhorning Asthma Research Fund and the Bastable-Potts Asthma Research Fund, amassing a total of $170,000 for graduate research since 2017.

== Asthma and Allergy HelpLine ==
Asthma Canada provides a free call-back service connecting Canadians with Certified Respiratory Educators (CREs) via phone or email. CREs are located all across Canada and are experts in the field of asthma and allergy education. They can provide up-to-date information and personalized advice in both English and French about:

- Newly diagnosed asthma
- Managing asthma symptoms
- Avoiding asthma triggers
- Treatment options

Asthma Canada has an Asthma and Allergy HelpLine.

== The Asthma Canada Member Alliance ==
The Asthma Canada Member Alliance (ACMA), formerly known as the National Asthma Patient Alliance, was founded in 2008 in Hamilton, Ontario. It is directed by a group of volunteers representing each province and territory in Canada. ACMA enables people with asthma to come together and engage in education and advocacy so that others with their condition can get the help they need. The goal of ACMA is to increase patient awareness of how to achieve optimal asthma control, address communication and advocacy needs of asthma patients, and build a network of patient volunteers dedicated to improving asthma care and education.

== Other programs ==
Asthma Canada spearheaded a letter-writing campaign to the Canadian government to advocate for equitable access to prescription medication, and continues to participate in advocacy campaigns that affect Canadians with asthma.

Asthma Canada is the official Canadian partner of the Asthma and Allergy Friendly certification program, operated by Allergy Standards Limited, which tests and certifies household products on a pass/fail basis for allergen reduction. Team Asthma is a brand that promotes asthma awareness and healthy lifestyles through participation in running races, triathlons, and other athletic competitions. Anyone with a connection to asthma is encouraged to join Team Asthma and wear its clothing during competitions.

Asthma Canada runs the Asthma Ambassadors program, which allows interested Canadians to disseminate asthma information in their communities. This is done through peer-to-peer support, providing education packages to their friends, and placing them in visible community locations.
