= Ward 8 Eglinton—Lawrence =

Municipal council district in Toronto, Ontario, Canada

- Constituency for the Toronto City Council
- Location of Ward 8 in Toronto
- City: Toronto
- Population: 114,395 (2016)

Current constituency
- Created: 2018
- Councillor: Michael Colle
- Community council: North York
- Created from: Ward 15; Ward 16
- First contested: 2018 election
- Last contested: 2026 election
- Ward profile: Ward 8 neighbourhood profile

Ward 8 Eglinton—Lawrence is a municipal electoral division in Toronto, Ontario, Canada that has been represented in the Toronto City Council since the 2018 municipal election. It was last contested in 2026, with Mike Colle elected councillor.

== Boundaries ==
On August 14, 2018, the Government of Ontario redrew municipal boundaries via the Better Local Government Act, 2018, S.O. 2018, c. 11 - Bill 5. This means that the 25 provincial electoral districts and the 25 municipal wards in Toronto currently share the same geographic borders.

Defined in legislation as:

Consisting of that part of the City of Toronto described as follows: commencing at the intersection of the GO Transit Railway situated westerly of Caledonia Road with Highway No. 401; thence easterly and northeasterly along said highway to Yonge Street; thence southerly along said street to Eglinton Avenue West; thence westerly along said avenue to the GO Transit Railway situated westerly of Croham Road; thence northerly along said railway to the point of commencement.

== History ==
=== 2018 Boundary Adjustment ===
Toronto municipal ward boundaries were significantly modified in 2018 during the election campaign. Ultimately the new ward structure was used and later upheld by the Supreme Court of Canada in 2021.

The current ward is an amalgamation of the old Ward 15 (western section), the old Ward 16 (eastern section).

=== 2018 municipal election ===
Eglinton—Lawrence was first contested during the 2018 municipal election with 10 candidates. Notably, former Metro councillor Mike Colle, who sat in the Legislative Assembly of Ontario and is the father of then-Ward 15 councillor Josh Colle ran against Christin Carmichael Greb, who was the then-Ward 16 incumbent. Colle was ultimately elected with 41.34 per cent of the vote.

== Geography ==
Ward 8 is part of the North York community council.

Eglinton—Lawrence's west boundary is the railway tracks where GO Transit's Barrie line runs and the east boundary is Yonge Street. The north boundary is Highway 401 and the south boundary is Eglinton Avenue.

== Councillors ==
Council term	Member	
Council term	Ward 15 Eglinton—Lawrence	Ward 16 Eglinton—Lawrence
2000–2003	Howard Moscoe	Anne Johnston
2003–2006	Howard Moscoe	Karen Stintz
2006–2010	Howard Moscoe	Karen Stintz
2010–2014	Josh Colle	Karen Stintz
2014–2018	Josh Colle	Christin Carmichael Greb
	Ward 8 Eglinton—Lawrence	
2018–2022	Mike Colle	
2022–2026	Mike Colle	
2026–2030	Mike Colle	

== Election results ==
2026 Toronto municipal election

Candidate	Votes	%	minus
Mike Colle (X)	32,085	70.26	0.05 ▼
Liz Grade	4,914	10.76	–
Jason McDonald	4,417	9.67	–
Enzo Torrone	2,591	5.67	–
Domenico Maiolo	1,001	2.19	0.08 ▲
Daniel Trayes	657	1.44	–

2022 Toronto municipal election, Ward 8 Eglinton—Lawrence
Candidate	Vote	%
Mike Colle (X)	17,109	70.31
Evan Sambasivam	3,447	14.17
Wendy Weston	1,990	8.18
Philip Davidovits	1,275	5.24
Domenico Maiolo	513	2.11

2018 Toronto municipal election, Ward 8 Eglinton—Lawrence
Candidate	Votes	Vote share
Mike Colle	14,094	41.34%
Christin Carmichael Greb	7,395	21.69%
Dyanoosh Youssefi	5,253	15.41%
Beth Levy	3,122	9.16%
Jennifer Arp	2,404	7.05%
Lauralyn Johnston	992	2.91%
Josh Pede	420	1.23%
Darren Dunlop	210	0.62%
Randall Pancer	134	0.39%
Peter Tijiri	72	0.21%
Total	34,096	100%
Source: City of Toronto

== See also ==
- Municipal elections in Canada
- Municipal government of Toronto
- List of Toronto municipal elections
